= 9 Days in Summer =

1967 British film by Philip Bond

- Directed by: Philip Bond
- Written by: Philip Bond
- Produced by: Norman Vigars
- Starring: Jim Clark; Graham Hill; Colin Chapman; Keith Duckworth; Walter Hayes; Harley Copp
- Cinematography: Dennis Ayling; Hilton Craig
- Edited by: Peter Gold
- Music by: Jeff Wayne
- Distributed by: Ford Film Unit; Philip Bond and Partners
- Release date: 1967
- Running time: 48 min.
- Country: United Kingdom
- Language: English

9 Days in Summer is a promotional documentary film made by Ford that tells the story of the development of the Ford-funded Cosworth DFV and Lotus 49, the title coming from the nine Formula One races the car took part in the 1967 Formula One season, which are also extensively featured in the film.

== Background ==
After the switch to 3 litre engines in 1966 Formula One season, many F1 teams such as Lotus that had previously been using Climax V8s had to find new engines in order to be competitive. After an unsuccessful partnership with BRM and their heavy, unreliable H16 engine Chapman persuaded Ford to fund the development of a new 3 litre V8 produced by Cosworth. The Ford Cosworth DFV was an innovative engine designed to form part of the chassis of the car, and went on to become the most successful engine in Formula 1 history amassing an incredible 155 wins.

== Synopsis ==
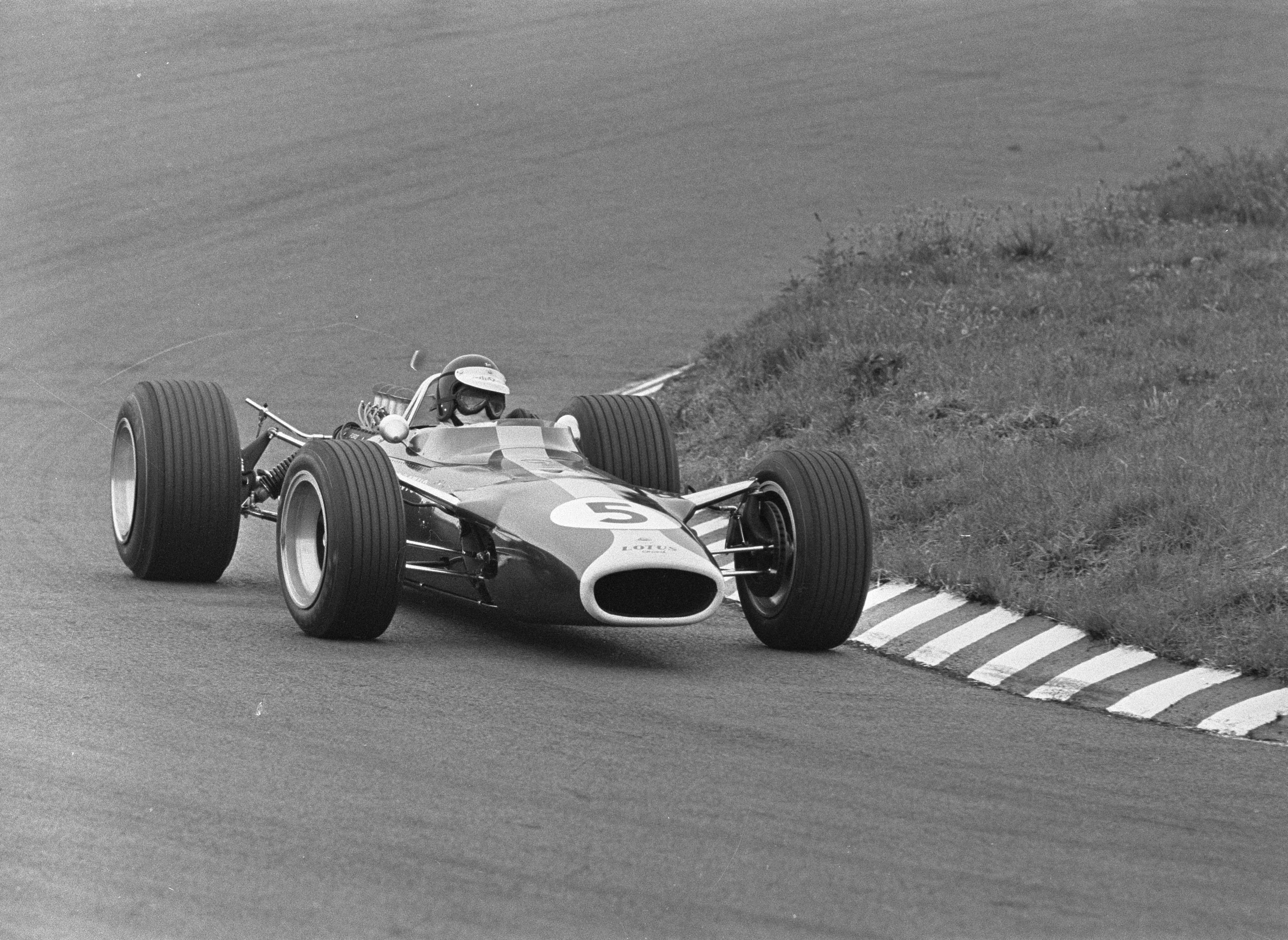
Clark and his Lotus Ford

The film opens showing Cosworth designer Keith Duckworth silently working away at his drawing board, then cuts to footage of the 1967 Dutch Grand Prix, over which the credits are superimposed, incorporated into a series of stylised gauges and dials. Jim Clark is shown winning the engine's début race.

Next the meeting in August 1966 at which Walter Hayes, Keith Duckworth, Colin Chapman and Harley Copp discuss plans for the new engine is shown, probably staged sometime later. The Belgian Grand Prix is then shown, Graham Hill and Clark both retiring.

Keith Duckwork and Cosworth's engineers are shown inspecting a new engine block before it is machined, footage of Cosworth's early computerised tools also being shown. A Lotus 49 is rolled out of its transporter, and the French Grand Prix is seen, where again both cars retire.

Back in the Cosworth factory, the first engine is assembled and tested on a dynamometer. Back on the race track, Clark wins again at the British Grand Prix but Hill retires and is shown doing an impromptu interview where he praises the new car.

Action switches to the Lotus factory where the Lotus 49 chassis is shown at an early stage of production. The chassis is finished and the engine mated to it for the first time, and Chapman explains the theory behind the new car. In Germany, Hill's car is shown being lifted onto a trailer after a practise shunt. The leading drivers are shown and named, and the race gets under way. Several cars are shown getting airborne over the Nürburgring's jumps. Both Lotuses retire with suspension trouble.

A Team Lotus transporter arrives at Snetterton, where Graham Hill tests the completed car for the first time. "It's got some poke, not a bad old tool" is Graham's verdict. To Canada, where the race is wet. Various double-exposure scenes of cars splashing around the wet circuit are shown. Clark retires, Hill finishes fourth.

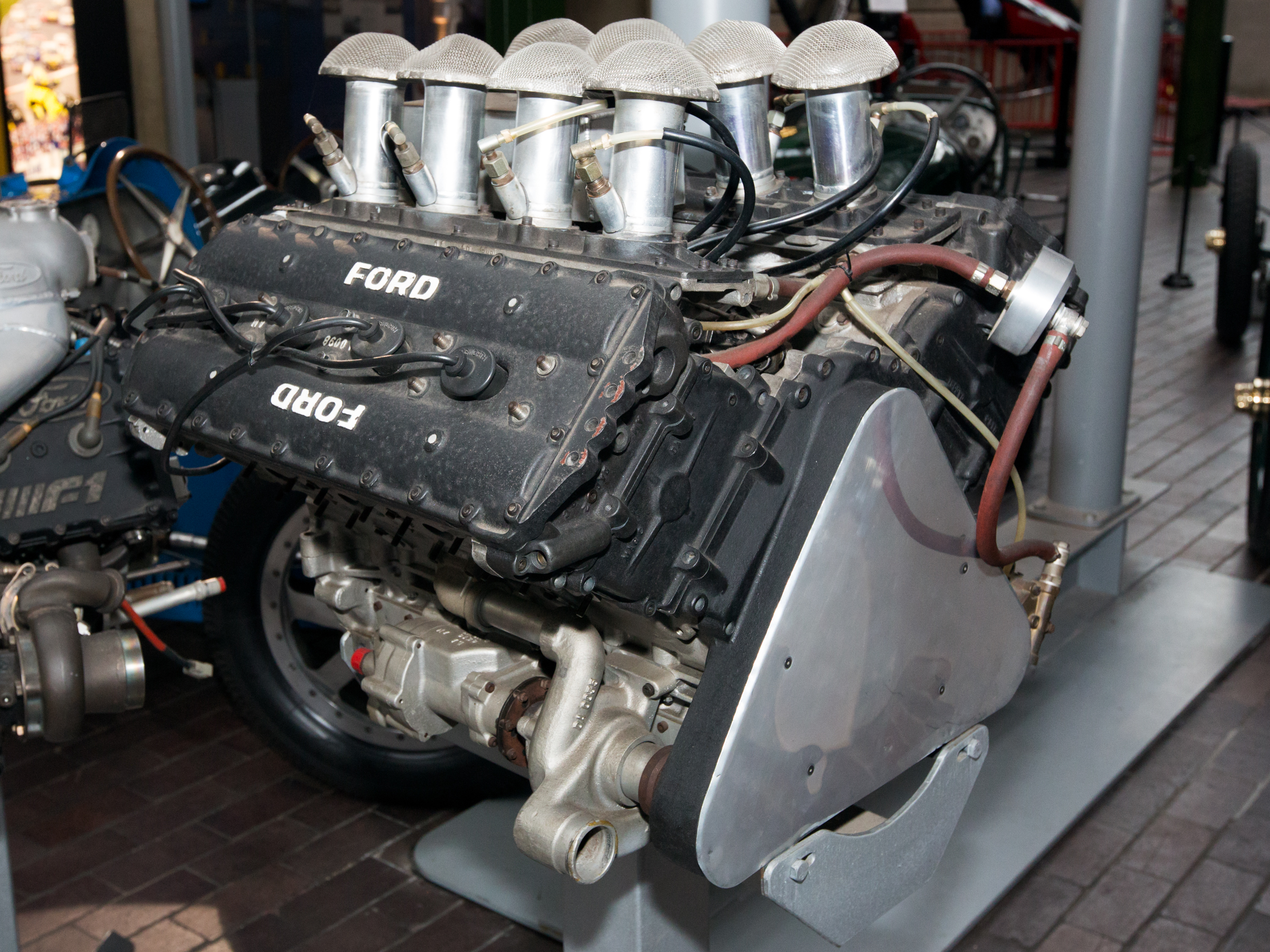
The Cosworth DFV became F1's most successful engine

Graham Hill is shown relaxing with his family in a swimming pool, a 7-year-old Damon Hill making an appearance. The action moves to Monza, where Clark is dropped to the back by a puncture, but comes from a lap down to lead the race, only for a fuel pump to fail on the last lap, dropping him to third. Surtees wins "by one frame of our camera, that's a forty-eighth of a second" over Brabham.

The film then shows a slightly melancholy Clark inspecting a deserted, fog-shrouded Watkins Glen, then fades to the start of the race. Clark and Hill lead, while various other cars are shown encountering problems. Chapman cheers his cars home in first and second place.

Straight to Mexico, where shots from the race of Clark and Hill actually battling for the lead are intercut with other footage clearly filmed at another time of the two cars running close together, but not at full racing speed. Hill retires, but Clark is shown being filmed by Mexican TV as he wins the race. Clark graciously shares his victor's laurel with Drivers' Champion Hulme, and the film ends showing a model of the Lotus 49 with five trophies in the background.
