= Roland Smith (disambiguation) =

Roland Smith is an American author.

Roland Smith may also refer to:

- J. Roland Smith (born 1933), American politician
- R. R. R. Smith (Roland Ralph Redfern Smith, born 1954), British classicist, archaeologist, and academic
- Sir Roland Smith (1928–2003), British academic and businessman
- Rolland Smith (born 1941), American television anchor
- David Smith (sculptor) (Roland David Smith, 1906–1965), American abstract expressionist sculptor and painter

== See also ==
- Rowland Smith, British politician
- Rowland Smith (industrialist) (1888–1988), British automotive industrialist
