= Cosworth DFV =

Internal combustion engine

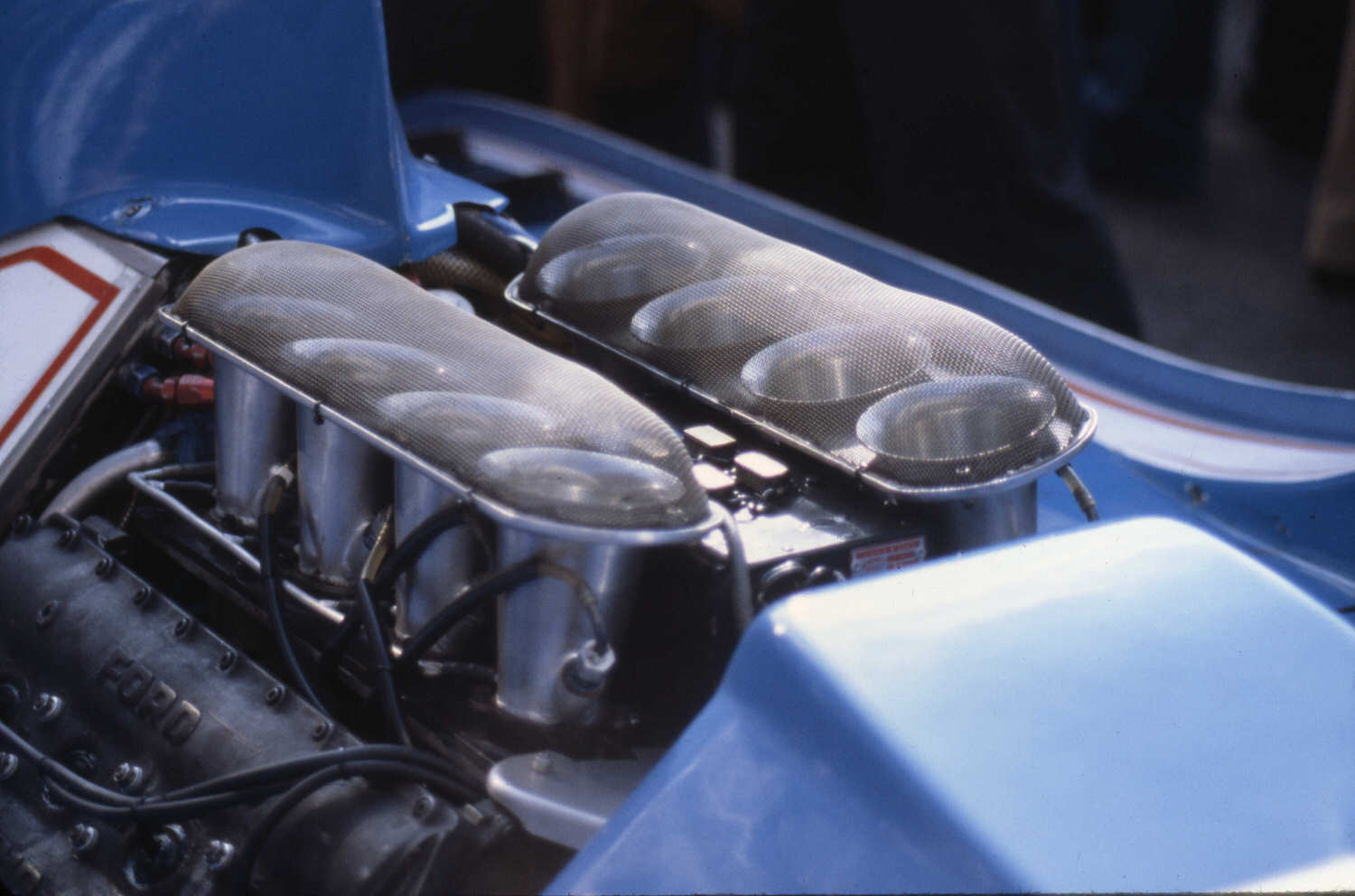

Overview
- Manufacturer: (United Kingdom) Ford-Cosworth
- Designer: Keith Duckworth; Mike Costin
- Production: 1967–1983

Layout
- Configuration: V8, naturally-aspirated, 90° cylinder angle
- Displacement: 2,987.1 cc (182.28 cu in)
- Cylinder bore: 85.6742 mm (3.37 in)
- Piston stroke: 64.77 mm (2.55 in)
- Cylinder block material: Aluminium alloy
- Cylinder head material: Aluminium alloy
- Valvetrain: 32-valve, DOHC, four-valves per cylinder

Combustion
- Fuel system: Mechanical indirect fuel injection
- Fuel type: Gasoline
- Oil system: Dry sump

Output
- Power output: 400–530 hp (298–395 kW)
- Torque output: 221–280 lb⋅ft (300–380 N⋅m)

Dimensions
- Dry weight: 168 kg (370.4 lb)

Chronology
- Successor: Ford-Cosworth HB

1968 Ford P68

1971 Tyrrell-Cosworth 002

1978 Lotus-Cosworth 79

The DFV is an internal combustion engine that was originally produced by Cosworth for Formula One motor racing. The name is an abbreviation of Double Four Valve, the engine being a V8 development of the earlier four-cylinder FVA, which had four valves per cylinder.

Its development in 1967 for Colin Chapman's Team Lotus was sponsored and funded by major American automotive manufacturer Ford. For many years it was the dominant engine in Formula One, with the whole engine program funded by Ford's European division, Ford Europe and engines badged as "Ford" for Formula One championship races. DFVs were widely available from the late 1960s to the mid 1980s and were used by every specialist team in F1 during this period with the exception of Ferrari, Alfa Romeo, Renault, BRM and Matra, who all designed, produced and ran their own engines. Variants of this engine were also used in other categories of racing, including CART, Formula 3000 and sports car racing.

The engine is a 90°, 2,993 cc V8 with a bore and stroke of 85.67 × 64.90 mm (3.373 × 2.555 in). It reliably produced over 400 bhp, specifically reaching 408 bhp at 9,000 rpm, and 270 ft⋅lbf (370 N⋅m) of torque at 7,000 rpm. By the end of its Formula 1 career, it achieved over 500 bhp, with a peak of 510 bhp at 11,200 rpm.

The 1983 DFY variant had an updated bore and stroke of 90.00 × 58.83 mm (3.543 × 2.316 in), maintaining a displacement of 2,993 cc. It produced 520–530 bhp at 11,000 rpm and 280 ft⋅lbf (380 N⋅m) of torque at 8,500 rpm.

== Background ==
In 1965, the Fédération Internationale de l'Automobile, that administered Formula One racing, agreed to raise the series' maximum engine capacity from 1.5 litres (92 cu in) to 3.0 litres (183 cu in) from 1966. Up until that point, Colin Chapman's successful Team Lotus cars had relied on power from fast revving Coventry Climax engines, but with the change in regulations Coventry Climax decided for business reasons not to develop a large capacity engine.

Chapman approached Keith Duckworth, previously a gearbox engineer at Lotus but now running his fledgling Cosworth company with Mike Costin, who commented that he could produce a competitive three-litre engine, given a development budget of £100,000.

Chapman approached the Ford Motor Company and David Brown of Aston Martin for funding, each without initial success. Chapman then approached Ford of Britain's public relations chief, former journalist Walter Hayes, with whom he had developed a close working relationship from the early 1960s. Since Hayes had joined Ford in 1962 the pair had previously collaborated in the production of the successful Lotus Cortina, introduced in 1963. Hayes arranged dinner for Chapman with Ford employee Harley Copp, a British-based American engineer who had backed and engineered Ford's successful entry into NASCAR in the 1950s. Hayes and Copp developed a business plan, which was backed by Ford UK's new chairman Stanley Gillen, and approved by Ford's Detroit head office as a two-part plan:

- Stage one would produce a four-cylinder FVA twin-cam engine for Formula Two
- Stage two would produce a V8 engine for Formula One, by May 1967

== Formula One ==
The project was revealed by Hayes in a PR launch in Detroit at the end of 1965, but the engine was not ready until the third race of the 1967 season, on the 4 June at Zandvoort. Its debut proved successful. Graham Hill, who was in the team at the specific request of Ford and Hayes, put his DFV-powered Lotus 49 on pole position by half a second and led for the first 10 laps but was then sidelined by a broken gear in the camshaft drive. Team-mate Jim Clark moved up through the field in his identical car and came home to win. However, this dominant performance belied a serious fault in the timing gear. Clark took three more wins that season, but reliability problems left him third in the Drivers' Championship, 10 points behind champion Denny Hulme. The progress of the engine was documented in a film produced by the Ford Motor Company's film section, entitled 9 Days in Summer.

Initially, the agreement between Ford, Cosworth and Lotus was binding on all parties, and Ford as the funder had no plans to sell or hire the DFV to any other teams. However, it occurred to Hayes that there was no competition: the Ferrari engine was initially underpowered; the BRM complex and too heavy; the Maserati unreliable; the Honda overweight; while Dan Gurney's Weslake motor was powerful but unreliable. Only Brabham's Repco V8 engine provided a usable combination of power, lightness and reliability, but its age and design left little room for further improvement. Hayes concluded that Ford's name could become tarnished if the Lotus were to continue winning against only lesser opposition, and that they should agree to use the unit in other teams, and hence potentially dominate Formula One.

At the end of 1967, Copp and Hayes gently explained to Chapman that he would no longer have monopoly use of the DFV and in August 1967 it was announced that the power unit would be available for sale, via Cosworth Engineering, to racing teams throughout the world. Hayes released the DFV initially to British team Matra International, headed by Ken Tyrrell with Jackie Stewart as a driver. What followed was a golden age, where teams big or small could buy an engine which was competitive, light, compact, easy to work with and relatively cheap (£7,500 at 1967 prices equivalent to $119,506 in 2025 ). The DFV effectively replaced the Coventry Climax as the standard F1 powerplant for the private (mostly British) teams.

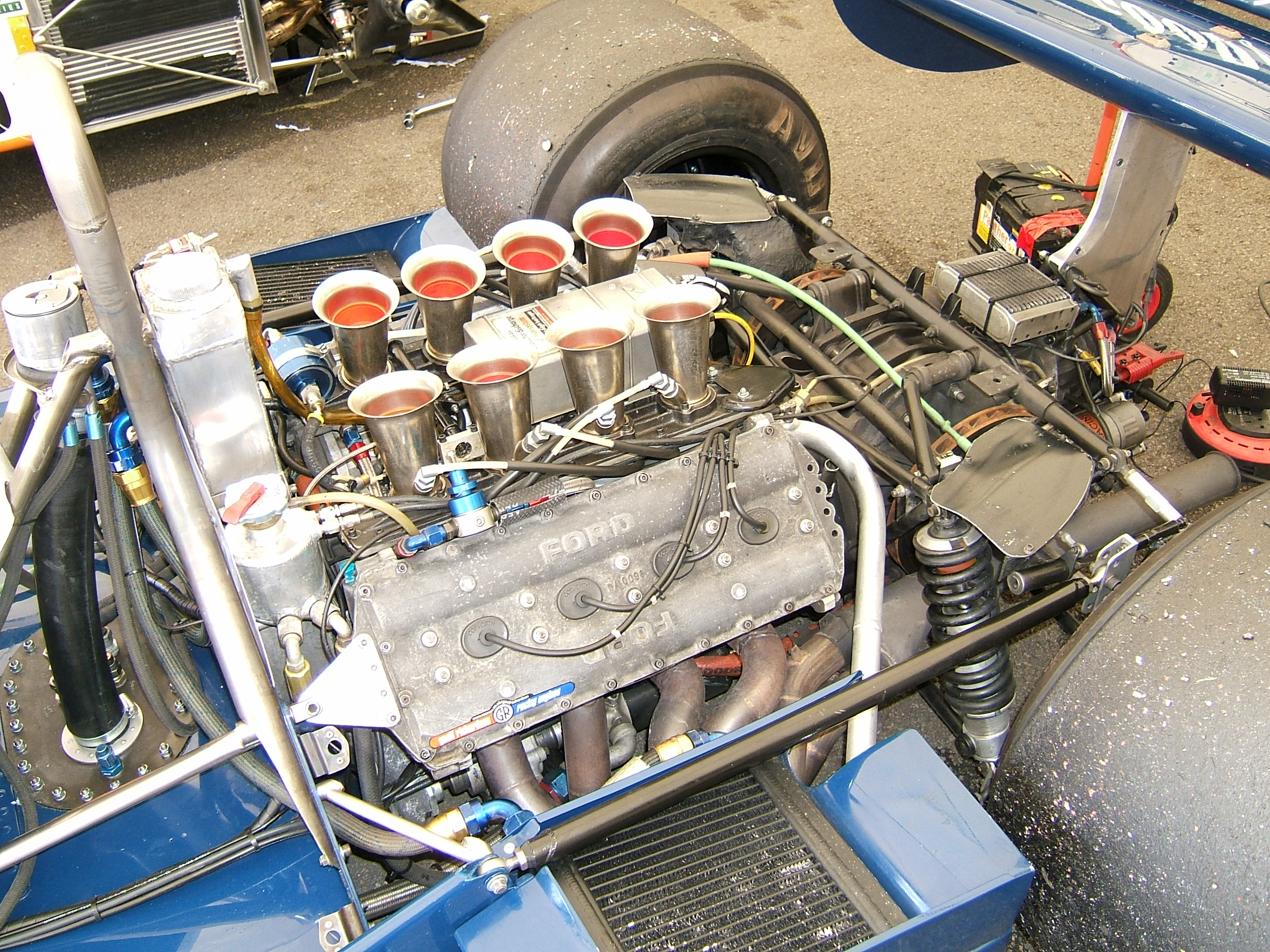
The classic DFV engine – Hewland gearbox combination, mounted in the rear of a 1978 Tyrrell 008

Lotus, McLaren, Matra, Brabham, March, Surtees, Tyrrell, Hesketh, Lola, Williams, Penske, Wolf and Ligier are just some of the teams to have used the DFV. In 1969 and 1973 every World Championship race was won by DFV-powered cars, with the engine taking a total of 155 wins from 262 races between 1967 and 1985.

The DFV-powered cars won also the Constructor championship, fighting with the Ferrari who won from 1975 to 1977 and in 1979.

The advent of ground effect aerodynamics on the F1 scene in 1977 provided a new lease of life for the now decade-old engine. The principle relied on Venturi tunnels on the underside of the car to create low pressure regions and thus additional downforce. Previously, teams running Ferrari and Alfa-Romeo flat-12 engines had enjoyed a handling advantage due to the low centre of gravity in such a configuration. However, for ground effect, the wide engine was completely the opposite of what was required as the cylinder heads protruded into the area where the Venturi tunnels should have been.

In contrast, the V-configuration of the Cosworth engine angled the cylinders upwards and left ample space under the car for the necessary under-body profile which massively increased downforce and gave more efficient aero balance, thus increasing cornering potential and straight line speed. Ground effect British cars and DFV engines effectively killed off the V12/flat 12 engines of Ferrari and Alfa Romeo which many pundits had believed in the mid-1970s would dominate F1 well into the mid-1980s. Drivers Mario Andretti in 1978, Alan Jones in 1980, Nelson Piquet in 1981 and Keke Rosberg in 1982 used a combination of British ground effect chassis and a DFV engine to claim the Drivers' Championship while DFV-powered cars took the Formula 1 Constructors' World Championship in 1978, 1980 and 1981.

The onset of the turbo era in the early 1980s put an end to the DFV's F1 activities, as even with modifications the 15-year-old engine could not hope to compete with the vast power being put out by the new 1.5-litre turbocharged engines. However, in the early days of turbo F1 cars (1979–1982) the Renault, Ferrari and Toleman were unable to offer consistent opposition to the Cosworth DFV British teams. The early turbo Renault, though powerful (particularly so on high altitude tracks such as Interlagos, Kyalami, Jarama, Dijon-Prenois and the Österreichring) were much heavier, cumbersome, complicated and significantly, much more unreliable than the British Cosworth DFV teams.

The extra power and torque of a turbo engine put much more strain on the gearbox, driveshafts and brakes on the Renaults and Ferraris, and during the early 1980s the sight of a Renault or Ferrari wilting under the strain of its extra power was a common sight. The turbo engine was also hampered by "throttle lag", a delay in throttle response which made the turbo cars very slow on tight, twisty circuits such as Monaco, Long Beach, Zolder, Montreal, Brands Hatch and Detroit, whereas the naturally-aspirated Cosworth DFV enjoyed pin-sharp response and accuracy. Also, the light and agile British cars exploited ground-effect technology so well that, even on fast tracks such as Buenos Aires, Silverstone, and Hockenheim, the DFV engine was able to win. For a few years, between 1977 when Renault debuted the powerful but unreliable turbo engine and 1982 when the DFV-powered teams began to negotiate deals for turbo engines of their own, a competitive equilibrium was established.

Some Cosworth-using constructors developed their engines in house during a Grand Prix season, such as John Nicholson's Nicholson McLaren operation or Williams F1 using John Judd's workshops to uprate the standard 480 BHP that the DFV was producing in the late 1970s/early 1980s. Uprated pistons, camshafts and valves meant Williams and McLaren's DFVs were producing over 510 BHP at around 11,000 RPM by the early 1980s, which meant the power deficit to the turbocharged Renaults and Ferraris was only around 30–40 BHP in race trim. Since a DFV only needed a 190-litre fuel tank, compared to the 220+ litre sized fuel tank required by a turbo engine, it meant the power to weight ratio of a McLaren MP4 or Williams FW07/08 with their specialist DFV engines were comparable to their turbocharged opponents, albeit with better fuel consumption and much less strain on the rear tyres, gearboxes and rear axle, meaning softer compounds could be used and last longer by both Williams and McLaren, which gave a significant benefit to both grip and tyre durability.

As of mid-1982, 375 engines had been built. The cost of a complete engine at that time, purchased directly from Cosworth, was £27,296, approximately equivalent to £97,000 in 2025.

Michele Alboreto took the DFV's last Formula One win at the 1983 Detroit Grand Prix with Tyrrell. The team would continue to use the DFY variant of the engine until 1985, when they switched to a new car with a turbocharged Renault V6.

The final DFV-powered car to enter a Formula One race was a Dallara 3087 driven by Alex Caffi for Scuderia Italia at the 1988 Brazillian Grand Prix. The car was unusual in the fact it was actually a slightly modified Formula 3000 car, with the team only entering it out of necessity due to their main car (the Dallara F188) not being ready in time for the start of the season.

=== Sportscar racing ===
The DFV was used in sportscar racing with some modest success. The design of the crankshaft caused vibrations that resulted in reliability problems in endurance racing. In 1968, new rules for the Sports Prototype class limited engine displacement to 3 litres and Ford (UK) sponsored the DFV-powered Ford P68 as their entry under the new rules. However, this car, and its derived sister the P69, failed to finish a single race during the two seasons that they competed. In 1971 a DFV-powered Ligier JS3 was able to finish first and second in two short-distance events, the best DFV-powered Sports Prototype showings to date, but was only able to achieve a non-classified finish at Le Mans after mechanical troubles. The next years would show that even that unsatisfactory result was beating the odds. The DFV came into wider use in 1972, when all purpose-built racers fell under the 3-litre engine limit. Eric Broadley's Lola, having previously focused on the 2-litre smaller class, designed their T280 model fitted with a Cosworth engine, which was very fast though it often failed to finish. Thirteen starts of DFV-powered vehicles at the Le Mans 24 Hours during 1972–74 yielded three finishes, two of which failed to complete 300 laps. The best result for DFV-powered vehicles at Le Mans was in 1975, when fuel consumption rules had the field using low power tuning and slower engine speeds, which slowed the race pace and mitigated the DFV's vibration problem. The top three finishers were powered by DFVs, with the Gulf-sponsored Mirage driven by Jacky Ickx and Derek Bell finishing first.

1976 saw a slightly faster pace for the Mirage and the DFV-powered De Cadenet Lola, but they were eclipsed by the new turbocharged Porsche 936, driven by Ickx and Gijs van Lennep, in first place. After two years with DFV-powered vehicles failing to run competitive distances, a DFV-powered Rondeau was the surprise winner in the 1980 race. Jean Rondeau and Jean-Pierre Jaussaud nursed a two lap lead over the Jacky Ickx / Reinhold Joest Porsche 908/80 charging back from earlier mechanical setbacks. Another Rondeau occupied the third spot, nine laps behind the winner. In 1981 Rondeau slightly improved on the pace of the previous year but, as in 1976, DFV-powered vehicles were again outclassed by a Porsche 936, driven this time by the old Mirage winning team of Ickx and Bell. The 1981 distance result, 340 laps, was the best ever achieved with the DFV. The DFV faded from relevance over 1982–1984, showing just two finishes of over 300 laps from fourteen starts at Le Mans.

Australian race driver Bap Romano used an ex-F1 Cosworth DFV engine (formerly used by McLaren) in his Australian designed and built Kaditcha Group A Sports Car through 1983 and 1984 in the Australian Sports Car Championships. After finishing 6th in the 1983 ASCC, winning the final round of the series, he would go on to dominate the 1984 championship. The renamed Romano WE84 won four of the five rounds and in all bar heat two of the opening round when the car was a non-starter due to an accident in the first heat, scored fastest lap while also sitting on pole for every round. The DFV in the Romano was later replaced in late 1984 by the Cosworth DFL engine.

==== Use of post-DFV variants ====
1982 saw the introduction of 3.3 and 3.9 litre DFLs, endurance racing versions of the DFV, in the World Endurance Championship. That year, the 3.3 litre variant powered the new Rondeau M382 to three podium finishes with a win in the 1000 km Monza event and a strong second place standing behind Porsche in season points. The DFLs proved insufficiently reliable for C1 class racing at the 24 Hours of Le Mans, achieving only three finishes in 34 starts during 1982–1984, with none achieving 300 laps. After 1982 the DFLs were never reliable or competitive in the C1 class and finished consistently behind C2 cars at Le Mans. The 3.9 litre version was completely rejected by 1985. The last start for a DFL in the C1 class at Le Mans was in 1988. 1984 saw success for the 3.3 litre version in the fuel-restricted C2 class, where low power tuning mitigated its reliability issues, with two class wins on the World Championship circuit. The 3.3 litre DFL became the most used engine of the C2 class, achieving four class championships, five class wins at Le Mans between 1985 and 1990 and the best distance of any Cosworth engine at Le Mans, at 351 laps, in 1988. Reliability of the C2 class was still considered unsatisfactory, however, and as the 1980s ended, the issue led the FIA to seek a new formula to replace the C2 class. 1989 saw the introduction of the 3.5 litre DFZ variant as a C1 class engine. It had the honor of being the first Cosworth engine to finish ahead of the C2 winner at Le Mans, but it was an inconsistent finisher and not competitive within the C1 class. It proved a consistent finisher and winner in the FIA Cup class, the low powered replacement of the C2 class, in 1992. The 3.5 litre DFR variant yielded more consistent results as a C1 engine for the Spice team in 1990 and the Euro Racing team in 1991, with two third-place finishes for the former, but they were never able to challenge the Peugeots, Jaguars and Sauber Mercedes for the top spot.

=== Formula 3000 ===
The DFV was also the engine for which the Formula 3000 series was created in 1985, and thus it won every race that year. The DFV and its variants continued racing in F3000 for a decade, Pedro Lamy taking the last win for a DFV at Pau in 1993, its 65th F3000 win in 123 races.

== Variants ==
=== DFW ===
The first variant produced from the DFV was a reduced-capacity unit for the Australia and New Zealand-based Tasman Series races of 1968–69. The changes between the DFV and DFW specification were limited to a reduced stroke, taking capacity to 2491 cc and reducing power output from the DFV's 420 bhp (313 kW; 426 PS) in 1967 to ~360 bhp (268 kW; 365 PS) (after winning the Surfers Paradise round of the 1968 Tasman Series, Jim Clark told that other than lacking the top end power of the DFV, there really wasn't a big difference in performance between the DFV and DFW). In Tasman Series racing, other 2.5L engines that the DFW was generally up against were the Australian made Repco V8, the Alfa Romeo V8 (as seen in Alfa's T33/2 endurance racing sports car), a 2.5L version of the BRM V8 engine, the 2.4L Ferrari V6, and the older 2.5L Coventry Climax FPF, the Australian versions of which were actually made under licence by Repco. On tighter tracks such as Wigram (NZ) and Warwick Farm (AUS), there was also the smaller capacity (1.6 L (1,598 cc)) Cosworth FVA to contend with.

The DFW was the smallest capacity variant of the DFV that was officially produced by Cosworth. The engine was a direct replacement for its DFV parent in Lotus 49s. The small engine proved just as competitive as the larger version; and Jim Clark took four race victories in 1968, though Clark also noted after the Surfers round on a track that suited higher powered cars, the lower power of the DFW was not quite suited to the full size Lotus 49T built for Formula One (highlighting the lack of top end punch along with the heavier F1 car, for the first half of the Surfers race Clark was in a dogfight for the lead with the smaller, more nimble Formula 2 chassis Ferrari of Chris Amon and its 285 bhp (213 kW; 289 PS) V6 engine, a scenario they would repeat when Clark beat Amon by just 0.1 seconds to win the 1968 Australian Grand Prix at another noted power circuit, Sandown in Melbourne). The DFW also saw one win for Piers Courage driving a Brabham BT24 for Frank Williams Racing, and two victories for Jochen Rindt in the 1969 Tasman Series (Rindt had replaced Clark at Lotus after the Scotsman's tragic death in a Formula 2 race at Hockenheim just over a month after winning the Tasman in 1968). Derek Bell drove a DFW version of the Brabham BT26 to second place in the 1970 New Zealand Grand Prix, and for the 1971 Tasman Series previous champion Chris Amon drove a DFW-powered version of his current Formula One chassis, the March 701, to another podium finish, but in both years the Formula One-derived engine was largely outmatched by Formula 5000 entrants with their 5.0L Repco-Holden and Chevrolet V8's producing some 480–500 bhp (358–373 kW; 487–507 PS) in 1971.

After the demise of the 2.5L component of the Tasman Formula following the 1971 season, the four DFW engines were converted back to DFV specification.

=== Formula One ===
The DFV had three major upgrades over its life in the top formula, with the development of first the DFY and then the DFZ, followed by a major redesign to produce the final DFR type.

==== DFY ====
Cosworth DFY

Overview
- Manufacturer: (United Kingdom) Ford-Cosworth
- Production: 1983–1985

Layout
- Configuration: V8, naturally-aspirated, 90° cylinder angle
- Displacement: 3.0 L (2,992.6 cc)
- Cylinder bore: 90 mm (3.5 in)
- Piston stroke: 58.8 mm (2.3 in)
- Cylinder block material: Aluminium alloy
- Cylinder head material: Aluminium alloy
- Valvetrain: 32-valve, DOHC, four-valves per cylinder

Combustion
- Fuel system: Electronic and mechanical indirect fuel injection
- Fuel type: Gasoline
- Oil system: Dry sump

Output
- Power output: 510–530 hp (380–395 kW)
- Torque output: 280 lb⋅ft (380 N⋅m)

Dimensions
- Dry weight: 150 kg (331 lb)

With the introduction of turbocharged engines towards the end of the 1970s, Cosworth's naturally aspirated DFV began to lose its predominance. In an attempt to recover some of the performance deficit Cosworth designer Mario Illien reconfigured the cylinder aspect ratio to allow the engine to rev more freely, and combined this with a narrow-angle valve set-up and Nikasil Aluminium liners. The changes upped power output to around 520 bhp (388 kW), and between 11,000-12,000 rpm but this was not sufficient to keep pace with the turbo cars at most tracks. It was only through a modicum of luck that Michele Alboreto was able to take what would prove to be the DFV-family's final F1 victory, at the 1983 Detroit Grand Prix. The DFY lived on with back-marker teams until the end of the 1985 season, when Cosworth switched their efforts to supporting the new turbocharged Ford GBA V6.

==== DFZ ====
Cosworth DFZ

Overview
- Manufacturer: (United Kingdom) Ford-Cosworth
- Production: 1987–1988

Layout
- Configuration: V8, naturally-aspirated, 90° cylinder angle
- Displacement: 3.5 L (3,494 cc)
- Cylinder bore: 90 mm (3.5 in)
- Piston stroke: 68.65 mm (2.7 in)
- Cylinder block material: Aluminium alloy
- Cylinder head material: Aluminium alloy
- Valvetrain: 32-valve, DOHC, four-valves per cylinder

Combustion
- Fuel system: Electronic and mechanical indirect fuel injection
- Fuel type: Gasoline
- Oil system: Dry sump

Output
- Power output: 575–590 hp (429–440 kW)
- Torque output: 320 lb⋅ft (434 N⋅m)

Dimensions
- Dry weight: 155 kg (342 lb)

The announcement at end of the 1986 season that turbocharged cars would be banned from 1989, and the introduction of the Jim Clark Cup and Colin Chapman Trophy championships for naturally aspirated cars for 1987, prompted Cosworth to revive their elderly engine design. This resulted in the DFZ, essentially an updated version of the final DFY design. However, the capacity increase for the new 3.5L naturally aspirated formula running alongside the 1.5L turbos in 1987 allowed Cosworth to increase the power output of the unit to 575 bhp (429 kW; 583 PS). The engine was intended as a temporary measure to tide smaller teams over until the turbos were banned at the end of the 1988 season. Tyrrell, AGS, March, Lola and Coloni chassis were all powered by Cosworth in 1987. Jonathan Palmer of Tyrrell eventually won the drivers' Jim Clark Cup, and his team took the constructors' laurels in the Colin Chapman Trophy. The engine remained in service with minor teams until the end of 1988 and development saw a slight power increase to 590 bhp (440 kW; 598 PS). The DFZ did not race in Formula One beyond 1988 as the general release of the DFR engine made it obsolete.

The engine did however have a second brief lease of life in sportscar racing, when the FIA announced plans to transition towards using 3.5 L F1-style engines in Group C in the early 1990s. In 1990 Spice Engineering adapted its existing Group C design to take a 3.5L DFZ instead of the previously used 3.3 L DFL engine. However the new engine caused significant problems due to vibration, which resulted in the breakage of components and a significant increase in running costs - Gordon Spice estimated that the DFZ-powered car was about four times more expensive to run than the DFL-engined one. The DFZ was successfully used in FIA Cup class racing in 1992, with that low-powered class being the last appearance of the DFV family in sportscar racing.

==== DFR ====
Cosworth DFR

Overview
- Manufacturer: (United Kingdom) Ford-Cosworth
- Production: 1988–1993

Layout
- Configuration: V8, naturally-aspirated, 90° cylinder angle
- Displacement: 3.5 L (3,494 cc)
- Cylinder bore: 90 mm (3.5 in)
- Piston stroke: 68.65 mm (2.7 in)
- Cylinder block material: Aluminium alloy
- Cylinder head material: Aluminium alloy
- Valvetrain: 32-valve, DOHC, four-valves per cylinder

Combustion
- Fuel system: Electronic indirect fuel injection
- Fuel type: Gasoline
- Oil system: Dry sump

Output
- Power output: 580–630 hp (433–470 kW)
- Torque output: 320–400 lb⋅ft (434–542 N⋅m)

Dimensions
- Dry weight: 155 kg (342 lb)

Chronology
- Predecessor: Cosworth GBA
- Successor: Ford-Cosworth HB

From 1987 Benetton had been operating as the works Ford team, essentially taking over the role from the now defunct Haas Lola team. With the abandonment of turbocharging it was clear that the venerable DFV/Y/Z design was nowhere near being competitive with far newer offerings from Honda and Renault who were building V10 engines for 1989 and beyond, and Ferrari who were building what they knew, a V12 (Lamborghini entered F1 in 1989 and like Ferrari, also went down the V12 path). To counter this, drastic changes were made for the DFR of 1988. Although superficially a DFV-design, almost the only feature carried over from previous versions into the DFR was the basic 90° V8 engine architecture. The DFR became available to all customers in 1989, with the Benetton team also using this engine until the 1989 British Grand Prix. The DFR struggled on until the 1991 season finally being eclipsed by the higher revving abilities of new pneumatic valve gear engines such as the HB, and was last used in that year's Australian Grand Prix by the Footwork, Fondmetal, Larrousse and Coloni teams, nearly a quarter of a century after the DFV's first race. By the time of its demise, continued improvement had pushed the DFR power output to nearly 630 bhp (470 kW; 639 PS), 60% higher than the original 1967 DFV.

The DFR enjoyed success in 1988 with Benetton. The team was the best performed non-turbo team of the season finishing third in the Constructors' Championship behind Ferrari (turbo) and the all-conquering McLaren-Honda. Thierry Boutsen recorded five podium finishes and Alessandro Nannini scored two podiums. The DFR was also the most powerful non-turbo of the season with a reported 620 bhp (462 kW; 629 PS). This compared to the 590 of the DFZ and the new Judd V8 with a reported 600 bhp (447 kW; 608 PS). This still lagged behind the Honda and Ferrari turbos which were producing over 650 bhp (485 kW; 659 PS) each.

The 3.5 L DFR engine was later used in the Allard J2X-C Group C sports car, in 1992.

=== North American series ===
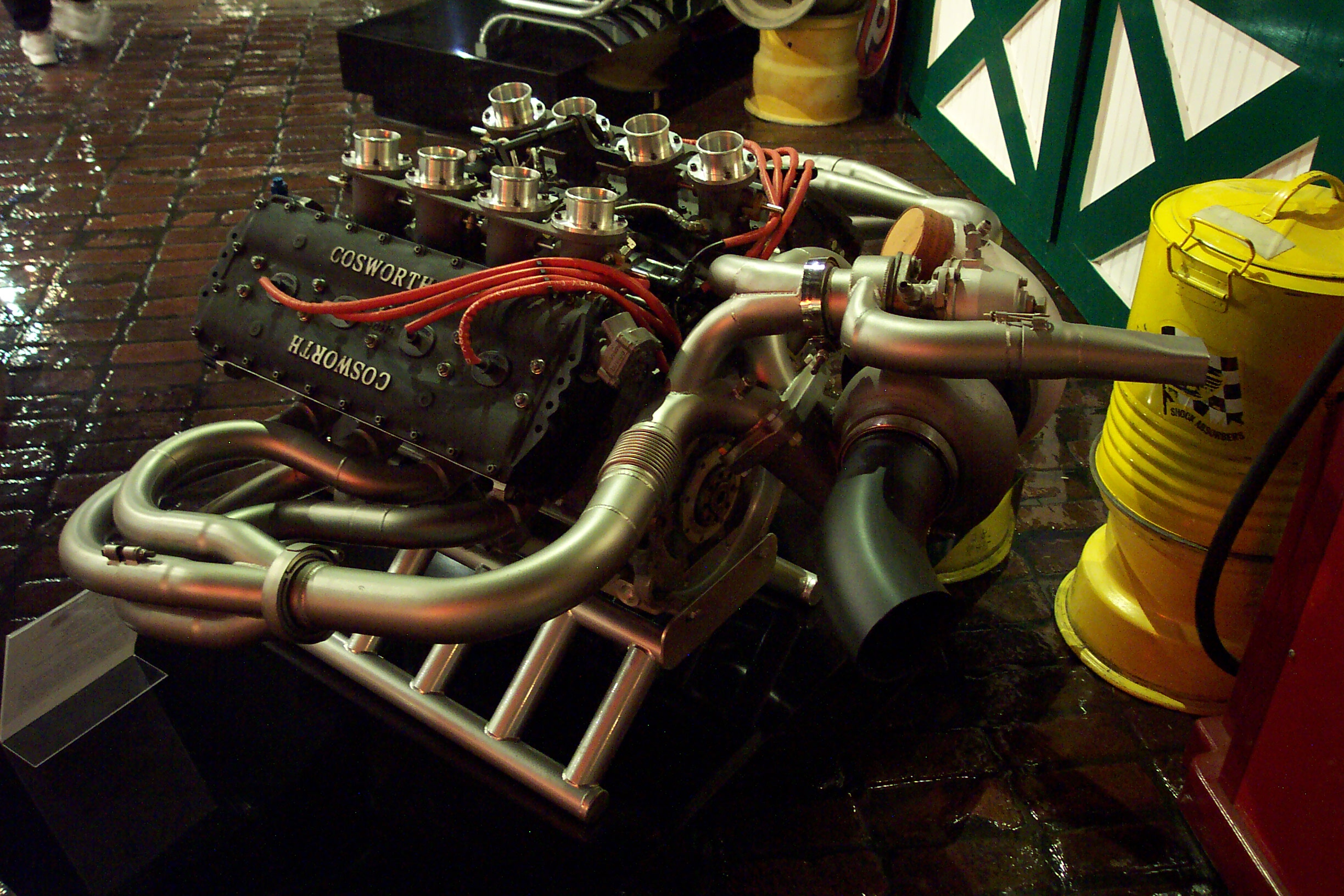
Cosworth DFX

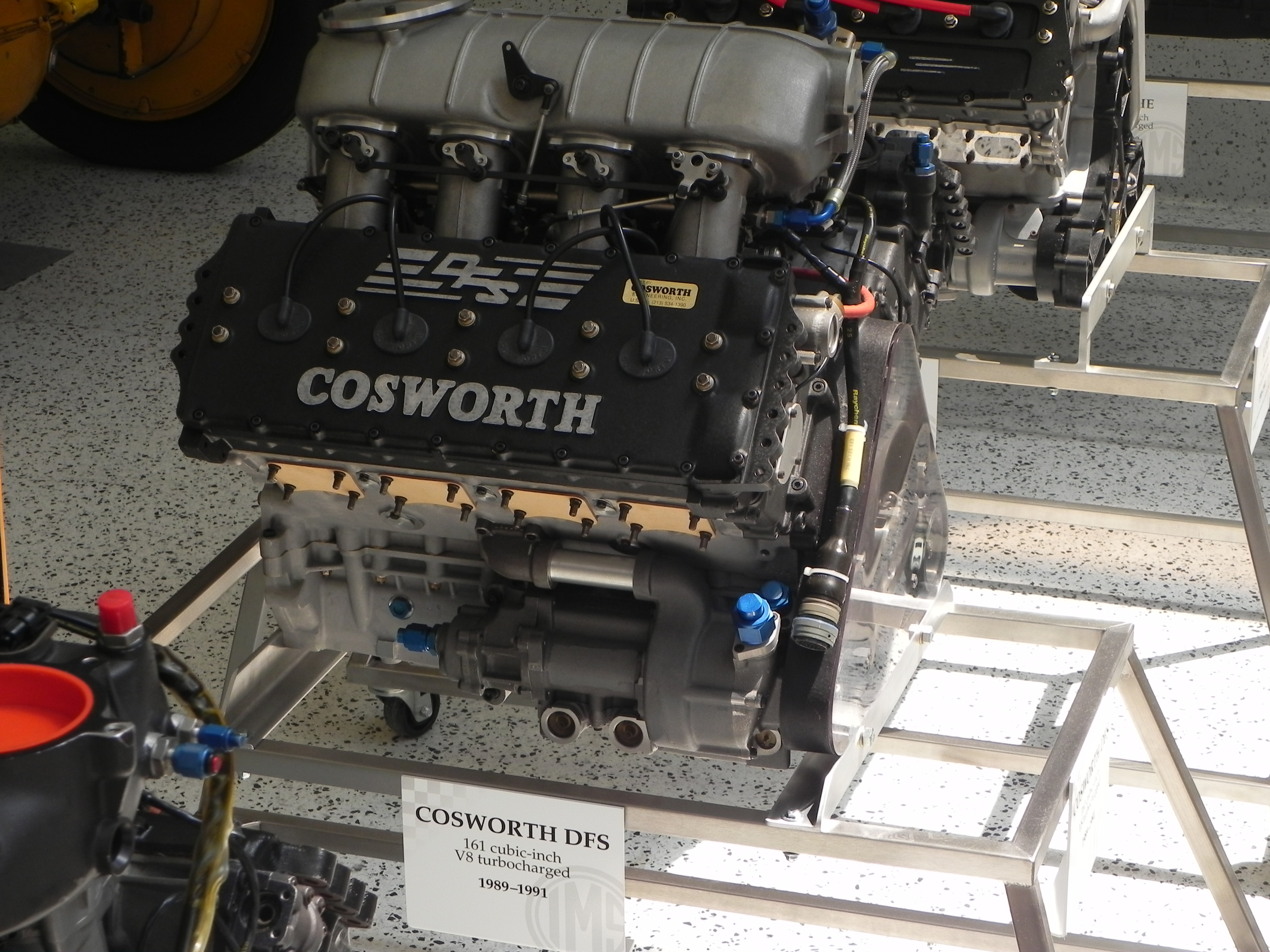
Cosworth DFS

==== DFX ====
Cosworth DFX

Overview
- Manufacturer: (United Kingdom) Ford-Cosworth
- Production: 1976–1987

Layout
- Configuration: 90° V8
- Displacement: 2.6 L (2,643 cc)
- Cylinder bore: 85.67 mm (3.373 in)
- Piston stroke: 57.3 mm (2 in)
- Valvetrain: 32-valve, DOHC, four-valves per cylinder
- Compression ratio: 11.2:1

Combustion
- Turbocharger: Cosworth
- Fuel system: Electronic fuel injection
- Fuel type: Gasoline
- Oil system: Dry sump

Output
- Power output: 720–840 hp (537–626 kW)
- Torque output: 340–490 lb⋅ft (461–664 N⋅m)

A 2.65 L turbocharged version of the DFV was developed privately by the Vels Parnelli Jones team for the 1976 USAC IndyCar season, in the face of opposition from Duckworth. The Parnelli-Cosworth car took its first victory at the 1976 Pocono 500, the fifth race of the season, driven by Al Unser. Unser and his Cosworth-powered Parnelli took two further victories before the end of the year, in Wisconsin and Phoenix, and finished the championship in fourth position.

Duckworth had been a guest of the Vels Parnelli team during the Pocono victory, as Parnelli Jones and Vel Miletich wanted to establish the team as the North American distributor for the turbocharged, Indycar-specification engine. However, shortly after the maiden race victory Cosworth poached two key engineers from the Parnelli team and set up facilities in Torrance, California, to develop and market the engine themselves. Henceforth it became known as the DFX. It went on to dominate American Indy car racing in much the same way the DFV had dominated Formula One. The engine won the Indianapolis 500 ten consecutive years from 1978 until 1987, as well as winning all USAC and CART championships between 1977 and 1987 except for one. For a brief time in the early 1980s, some of the DFX engines were badged as Fords. The DFX powered 81 consecutive Indy car victories from 1981 to 1986, and 153 victories total. By the time it was replaced, the DFX was developing over 840 bhp (630 kW).

==== DFS ====
In 1986 GM financed the British Ilmor firm to build a competitor to the DFX in American Indy car racing. Mario Illien's Ilmor-Chevrolet Indy V-8, which owed not a little to the DFY of five years earlier, quickly took over dominance of the sport.

Ford responded by commissioning Cosworth to redesign the DFX to include a number of DFR improvements. In 1989, they introduced an updated "short stroke" version of the Indy car engine which would be referred to as the "DFS" ("S" for short stroke)., and the Nikasil Aluminium liners, adopted on DFY in 1983.

The engine was fielded by two teams in its first season: Kraco Racing (Bobby Rahal) and Dick Simon Racing (Arie Luyendyk), and its development was an effort to regain dominance of the sport. At Indy, neither car qualified in the front two rows, but both started in the top ten. On race day, both drivers dropped out with engine failures. Rahal won one race in 1989 at the Meadowlands. However, the Kraco team merged with Galles at season's end, dropped the program, and switched to Chevrolets.

In 1990, the factory development was continued by Scott Brayton and Dominic Dobson, but neither won any races. The engine was utilized by other CART teams in 1991–1992, and was retired after the introduction of the Ford Cosworth XB with only one victory, that being Rahal's in 1989.

=== DFL ===
Cosworth DFL

Overview
- Manufacturer: (United Kingdom) Ford-Cosworth
- Production: 1981–1984

Layout
- Configuration: V8, naturally-aspirated, 90° cylinder angle
- Displacement: 4.0 L (3,954.4 cc); 3.3 L (3,298 cc)
- Cylinder bore: 90 mm (3.5 in)
- Piston stroke: 77.7 mm (3.1 in); 64.8 mm (2.6 in)
- Cylinder block material: Aluminium alloy
- Cylinder head material: Aluminium alloy
- Valvetrain: 32-valve, DOHC, four-valves per cylinder
- Compression ratio: 12.0:1-12.5:1

Combustion
- Fuel system: Electronic indirect fuel injection
- Fuel type: Gasoline
- Oil system: Dry sump

Output
- Power output: 490–700 hp (365–522 kW)
- Torque output: 340–510 lb⋅ft (461–691 N⋅m)

In 1981 a variant of the DFV named the DFL (for long-distance) was produced specifically for use in the new Group C sports car racing class. The engine was modified to larger capacity 3,298 cc (201.3 cu in) and 3,955 cc (241.3 cu in) versions (despite technically being 4.0 Litres, the 3955 cc version was always referred to as a 3.9 Litre), both with wider bore and longer stroke dimensions than the standard DFV. Both versions were plagued by reliability issues worse than with the DFV they were supposed to replace. The 3.3 L version powered Rondeau to the second points standing in the World Sportscar Championship season of 1982, but it was insufficiently reliable to be competitive in the longer events. Thereafter, the 3.3 L DFL in the C1 class was unsuccessful, with those who managed to actually finish invariably ending up behind C2 cars. The new fuel-restricted C Junior (C2) class in 1983 opened a niche for successful use of the 3.3 L version, where low power tuning brought its reliability to a level where it could succeed. In the C2 category it powered many privateer cars, mostly Spices and Tigas, to class victories around the world, including five at the 24 Hours of Le Mans between 1985 and 1990. The 3.9 L version never achieved the same success as its smaller sibling, with most users finding incurable engine vibrations and it was out of competition use by 1985. It was used to power the famous Ford Supervan and Supervan 2 promotional projects, as well as the Australian designed and built Romano WE84 in the Australian Sports Car Championship, which ran the 3.0 L DFV in the championship before upgrading to the 3.9 L DFL for the 1984 World Endurance Championship round at the Sandown Raceway in Melbourne, where it finished 100 laps behind the class winner.

In August 1982, a turbocharged version of this engine was tested briefly on the Brands Hatch Circuit mounted on a Ford C100.

=== P86 750cc motorcycle engine ===
In 1973 Norton approached Cosworth to help build a new engine that could be used for both street and racing motorcycles. The idea was to create a 750-cc parallel-twin version of the DFV, with liquid-cooling, 4-valve head, dual overhead cams and flat combustion chambers. Expected power was to be 65–75 hp for road bikes, and at least 100 hp for the racing bikes.

The P86 had a bore of 85.6 mm and a stroke of 64.8 mm, giving a capacity of 746 cc. A timing belt was used to drive the cams, rather than the gear train used on the DFV. The P86 shared the same combustion chamber, head designs, pistons and rods from the DFV.

Norton specified that the P86 must run through a single carburettor source, which led to a 360° firing interval, with both pistons rising and falling as a pair. As this led to increased vibration, a dual counterbalancing system was developed, in conjunction with a heavy flywheel. In an engine weighing 195 lb, 75 lb of that was a rotating mass inside, which was a lot of inertia to be driven.

The P86 had downdraught ports like the DFV, but used two Amal carburettors, rather than the fuel injection of the DFV. The carburettors and angle in relation hampered fuel delivery and power output.

Dyno testing showed that the P86 developed 90 hp, down on the projected 100 hp, while the massive amount of rotating weight inside the engine (counter balancers and flywheel) hindered throttle response. The overall weight of the engine meant that it was never going to be as light as equivalent engines from Japanese manufacturers. The belt driven timing system was inaccurate, while the belts themselves were fragile and prone to breaking.

The P86 was fitted in a Norton 'frameless' chassis that made its racing debut in 1975, but results were poor, due to the lack of power. When Norton Villiers Triumph was split up in 1976, an offshoot company called NVT Engineering disbanded the testing and racing departments, and the existing bikes and spare engines (30 in total) were sold off.

The P86 made a brief comeback 10 years later at the 1986 Battle of the Twins, held at the Daytona International Speedway. The Quantel entry featured one of the surviving P86 engines – reworked, fitted with fuel injection and bored out to 823 cc. Ridden by Paul Lewis, the Quantel finished 2nd, and would win the event in 1988 ridden by Roger Marshall.

== Major successes ==
DFV normally aspirated 3.0-litre 90° V8

Formula One Drivers' Champions (12):

- 1968 Graham Hill (Lotus)
- 1969 Jackie Stewart (Matra)
- 1970 Jochen Rindt (Lotus)
- 1971 Jackie Stewart (Tyrrell)
- 1972 Emerson Fittipaldi (Lotus)
- 1973 Jackie Stewart (Tyrrell)
- 1974 Emerson Fittipaldi (McLaren)
- 1976 James Hunt (McLaren)
- 1978 Mario Andretti (Lotus)
- 1980 Alan Jones (Williams)
- 1981 Nelson Piquet (Brabham)
- 1982 Keke Rosberg (Williams)

Formula One Constructors' Champions (10):

- 1968 Lotus
- 1969 Matra
- 1970 Lotus
- 1971 Tyrrell
- 1972 Lotus
- 1973 Lotus
- 1974 McLaren
- 1978 Lotus
- 1980 Williams
- 1981 Williams

Le Mans 24 Hours winners (2):

- 1975 Jacky Ickx/Derek Bell (Mirage),
- 1980 Jean Rondeau/Jean-Pierre Jaussaud (Rondeau)

Formula 3000 Champions (6):

- 1985 Christian Danner (March Engineering)
- 1986 Ivan Capelli (March Engineering)
- 1987 Stefano Modena (March Engineering)
- 1988 Roberto Moreno (Reynard)
- 1992 Luca Badoer (Reynard)

DFX turbocharged 2.65-litre 90° V8

Indy 500 winners (10):

- 1978 Al Unser (Lola)
- 1979 Rick Mears (Penske)
- 1980 Johnny Rutherford (Chaparral)
- 1981 Bobby Unser (Penske)
- 1982 Gordon Johncock (Wildcat)
- 1983 Tom Sneva (March)
- 1984 Rick Mears (March)
- 1985 Danny Sullivan (March)
- 1986 Bobby Rahal (March)
- 1987 Al Unser (March)

USAC Champions (3):

- 1977 Tom Sneva (McLaren/Penske)
- 1978 Tom Sneva (Penske)
- 1979 A. J. Foyt (Parnelli*)

CART Champions (9):

- 1979 Rick Mears (Penske)
- 1980 Johnny Rutherford (Chaparral)
- 1981 Rick Mears (Penske)
- 1982 Rick Mears (Penske)
- 1983 Al Unser (Penske)
- 1984 Mario Andretti (Lola)
- 1985 Al Unser (March)
- 1986 Bobby Rahal (March)
- 1987 Bobby Rahal (Lola)

== Partial Formula One Championship results ==
(key) (Races in bold indicate pole position) (Races in italics indicate fastest lap)

Formula One Championship results
| Year | Entrant | Chassis | Engine | Tyre | Drivers | 1 | 2 | 3 | 4 | 5 | 6 | 7 | 8 | 9 | 10 | 11 | 12 | 13 | Points | WCC |
|---|---|---|---|---|---|---|---|---|---|---|---|---|---|---|---|---|---|---|---|---|
| 1967 | Team Lotus | Lotus 49 | Cosworth DFV 3.0 V8 | F | | RSA | MON | NED | BEL | FRA | GBR | GER | CAN | ITA | USA | MEX | | | 44 | 2nd |
| 1967 | Team Lotus | Lotus 49 | Cosworth DFV 3.0 V8 | F | (United Kingdom) Jim Clark | | | 1 | **6** | Ret | **1** | **Ret** | **Ret** | **3** | 1 | **1** | | | 44 | 2nd |
| 1967 | Team Lotus | Lotus 49 | Cosworth DFV 3.0 V8 | F | (United Kingdom) Graham Hill | | | **Ret** | Ret | **Ret** | Ret | Ret | 4 | Ret | **2** | Ret | | | 44 | 2nd |
| 1967 | Team Lotus | Lotus 49 | Cosworth DFV 3.0 V8 | F | (Canada) Eppie Wietzes | | | | | | | | DSQ | | | | | | 44 | 2nd |
| 1967 | Team Lotus | Lotus 49 | Cosworth DFV 3.0 V8 | F | (Italy) Giancarlo Baghetti | | | | | | | | | Ret | | | | | 44 | 2nd |
| 1967 | Team Lotus | Lotus 49 | Cosworth DFV 3.0 V8 | F | (Mexico) Moisés Solana | | | | | | | | | | Ret | Ret | | | 44 | 2nd |
| 1968 | Team Lotus | Lotus 49 | Cosworth DFV 3.0 V8 | F | | RSA | ESP | MON | BEL | NED | FRA | GBR | GER | ITA | CAN | USA | MEX | | 62 | 1st |
| 1968 | Team Lotus | Lotus 49 | Cosworth DFV 3.0 V8 | F | (United Kingdom) Jim Clark | **1** | | | | | | | | | | | | | 62 | 1st |
| 1968 | Team Lotus | Lotus 49 | Cosworth DFV 3.0 V8 | F | (United Kingdom) Graham Hill | 2 | | | | | | | | | | | | | 62 | 1st |
| 1968 | Gold Leaf Team Lotus | Lotus 49; Lotus 49B | Cosworth DFV 3.0 V8 | F | (United Kingdom) Graham Hill | | 1 | **1** | Ret | 9 | Ret | **Ret** | 2 | Ret | 4 | 2 | 1 | | 62 | 1st |
| 1968 | Gold Leaf Team Lotus | Lotus 49; Lotus 49B | Cosworth DFV 3.0 V8 | F | (United Kingdom) Jackie Oliver | | | Ret | 5 | NC | DNS | Ret | 11 | Ret | Ret | DNS | 3 | | 62 | 1st |
| 1968 | Gold Leaf Team Lotus | Lotus 49; Lotus 49B | Cosworth DFV 3.0 V8 | F | (United States) Mario Andretti | | | | | | | | | DNS | | **Ret** | | | 62 | 1st |
| 1968 | Gold Leaf Team Lotus | Lotus 49; Lotus 49B | Cosworth DFV 3.0 V8 | F | (Canada) Bill Brack | | | | | | | | | | Ret | | | | 62 | 1st |
| 1968 | Gold Leaf Team Lotus | Lotus 49; Lotus 49B | Cosworth DFV 3.0 V8 | F | (Mexico) Moisés Solana | | | | | | | | | | | | Ret | | 62 | 1st |
| 1968 | Rob Walker Racing Team | Lotus 49; Lotus 49B | Cosworth DFV 3.0 V8 | F | (Switzerland) Jo Siffert | | Ret | Ret | 7 | Ret | 11 | 1 | Ret | Ret | Ret | 5 | **6** | | 62 | 1st |
| 1968 | Bruce McLaren Motor Racing | McLaren M7A | Cosworth DFV 3.0 V8 | G | (New Zealand) Denny Hulme | | 2 | 5 | Ret | Ret | 5 | 4 | 7 | 1 | 1 | Ret | Ret | | 49 | 2nd |
| 1968 | Bruce McLaren Motor Racing | McLaren M7A | Cosworth DFV 3.0 V8 | G | (New Zealand) Bruce McLaren | | Ret | Ret | 1 | Ret | 8 | 7 | 13 | Ret | 2 | 6 | 2 | | 49 | 2nd |
| 1968 | Anglo American Racers | McLaren M7A | Cosworth DFV 3.0 V8 | G | (United States) Dan Gurney | | | | | | | | | | Ret | 4 | Ret | | 49 | 2nd |
| 1968 | Matra International | Matra MS9 | Cosworth DFV 3.0 V8 | D | (United Kingdom) Jackie Stewart | Ret | | | | | | | | | | | | | 45 | 3rd |
| 1968 | Matra International | Matra MS10 | Cosworth DFV 3.0 V8 | D | (United Kingdom) Jackie Stewart | | | | 4 | 1 | 3 | 6 | 1 | Ret | 6 | 1 | 7 | | 45 | 3rd |
| 1968 | Matra International | Matra MS10 | Cosworth DFV 3.0 V8 | D | (France) Jean-Pierre Beltoise | | 5 | | | | | | | | | | | | 45 | 3rd |
| 1968 | Matra International | Matra MS10 | Cosworth DFV 3.0 V8 | D | (France) Johnny Servoz-Gavin | | | Ret | | | | | | 2 | Ret | | Ret | | 45 | 3rd |
| 1969 | Matra International | Matra MS10; Matra MS80; Matra MS84 | Cosworth DFV 3.0 V8 | D | | RSA | ESP | MON | NED | FRA | GBR | GER | ITA | CAN | USA | MEX | | | 66 | 1st |
| 1969 | Matra International | Matra MS10; Matra MS80; Matra MS84 | Cosworth DFV 3.0 V8 | D | (United Kingdom) Jackie Stewart | 1 | 1 | **Ret** | 1 | **1** | 1 | 2 | 1 | Ret | Ret | 4 | | | 66 | 1st |
| 1969 | Matra International | Matra MS10; Matra MS80; Matra MS84 | Cosworth DFV 3.0 V8 | D | (France) Jean-Pierre Beltoise | 6 | 3 | Ret | 8 | 2 | 9 | 12 | 3 | 4 | Ret | 5 | | | 66 | 1st |
| 1969 | Matra International | Matra MS10; Matra MS80; Matra MS84 | Cosworth DFV 3.0 V8 | D | (France) Johnny Servoz-Gavin | | | | | | | | | 6 | NC | 8 | | | 66 | 1st |
| 1969 | Motor Racing Developments Ltd. | Brabham BT26A | Cosworth DFV 3.0 V8 | G | (Australia) Jack Brabham | **Ret** | Ret | Ret | 6 | | | | Ret | 2 | 4 | **3** | | | 49 (51) | 2nd |
| 1969 | Motor Racing Developments Ltd. | Brabham BT26A | Cosworth DFV 3.0 V8 | G | (Belgium) Jacky Ickx | Ret | 6 | Ret | 5 | 3 | 2 | 1 | 10 | 1 | Ret | 2 | | | 49 (51) | 2nd |
| 1969 | Frank Williams Racing Cars | Brabham BT26A | Cosworth DFV 3.0 V8 | D | (United Kingdom) Piers Courage | | Ret | 2 | Ret | Ret | 5 | Ret | 5 | Ret | 2 | 10 | | | 49 (51) | 2nd |
| 1969 | Silvio Moser Racing Team | Brabham BT24 | Cosworth DFV 3.0 V8 | G | (Switzerland) Silvio Moser | | | Ret | Ret | 7 | | | Ret | Ret | 6 | 11 | | | 49 (51) | 2nd |
| 1969 | Gold Leaf Team Lotus | Lotus 49B; Lotus 63 | Cosworth DFV 3.0 V8 | F | (United Kingdom) Graham Hill | 2 | Ret | 1 | 7 | 6 | 7 | 4 | 9 | Ret | Ret | | | | 47 | 3rd |
| 1969 | Gold Leaf Team Lotus | Lotus 49B; Lotus 63 | Cosworth DFV 3.0 V8 | F | (Austria) Jochen Rindt | Ret | **Ret** | | **Ret** | Ret | **4** | Ret | **2** | 3 | **1** | Ret | | | 47 | 3rd |
| 1969 | Gold Leaf Team Lotus | Lotus 49B; Lotus 63 | Cosworth DFV 3.0 V8 | F | (United States) Mario Andretti | Ret | | | | | | Ret | | | Ret | | | | 47 | 3rd |
| 1969 | Gold Leaf Team Lotus | Lotus 49B; Lotus 63 | Cosworth DFV 3.0 V8 | F | (United Kingdom) Richard Attwood | | | 4 | | | | | | | | | | | 47 | 3rd |
| 1969 | Gold Leaf Team Lotus | Lotus 49B; Lotus 63 | Cosworth DFV 3.0 V8 | F | (United Kingdom) John Miles | | | | | Ret | 10 | | Ret | Ret | | Ret | | | 47 | 3rd |
| 1969 | Rob Walker Racing Team | Lotus 49B | Cosworth DFV 3.0 V8 | F | (Switzerland) Jo Siffert | 4 | Ret | 3 | 2 | 9 | 8 | 11 | 8 | Ret | Ret | Ret | | | 47 | 3rd |
| 1969 | Team Gunston | Lotus 49 | Cosworth DFV 3.0 V8 | D | (Rhodesia) John Love | Ret | | | | | | | | | | | | | 47 | 3rd |
| 1969 | Ecurie Bonnier | Lotus 63 | Cosworth DFV 3.0 V8 | F | (Sweden) Jo Bonnier | | | | | | Ret | | | | | | | | 47 | 3rd |
| 1969 | Ecurie Bonnier | Lotus 49B | Cosworth DFV 3.0 V8 | F | (Sweden) Jo Bonnier | | | | | | | Ret | | | | | | | 47 | 3rd |
| 1969 | Pete Lovely Volkswagen Inc. | Lotus 49B | Cosworth DFV 3.0 V8 | F | (United States) Pete Lovely | | | | | | | | | 7 | Ret | 9 | | | 47 | 3rd |
| 1969 | Bruce McLaren Motor Racing | McLaren M7A; McLaren M7B; McLaren M7C | Cosworth DFV 3.0 V8 | G | (New Zealand) Denny Hulme | 3 | 4 | 6 | 4 | 8 | Ret | Ret | 7 | Ret | Ret | 1 | | | 38 (40) | 4th |
| 1969 | Bruce McLaren Motor Racing | McLaren M7A; McLaren M7B; McLaren M7C | Cosworth DFV 3.0 V8 | G | (New Zealand) Bruce McLaren | 5 | 2 | 5 | Ret | 4 | 3 | 3 | 4 | 5 | DNS | DNS | | | 38 (40) | 4th |
| 1969 | Bruce McLaren Motor Racing | McLaren M9A | Cosworth DFV 3.0 V8 | G | (United Kingdom) Derek Bell | | | | | | Ret | | | | | | | | 38 (40) | 4th |
| 1969 | Team Lawson | McLaren M7A | Cosworth DFV 3.0 V8 | D | (South Africa) Basil van Rooyen | Ret | | | | | | | | | | | | | 38 (40) | 4th |
| 1969 | Antique Automobiles | McLaren M7B | Cosworth DFV 3.0 V8 | G | (United Kingdom) Vic Elford | | | | 10 | 5 | 6 | Ret | | | | | | | 38 (40) | 4th |
| 1970 | Gold Leaf Team Lotus | Lotus 49C; Lotus 72; Lotus 72B; Lotus 72C | Cosworth DFV 3.0 V8 | F | | RSA | ESP | MON | BEL | NED | FRA | GBR | GER | AUT | ITA | CAN | USA | MEX | 59 | 1st |
| 1970 | Gold Leaf Team Lotus | Lotus 49C; Lotus 72; Lotus 72B; Lotus 72C | Cosworth DFV 3.0 V8 | F | (Austria) Jochen Rindt | 13 | Ret | 1 | Ret | **1** | 1 | **1** | 1 | **Ret** | DNS | | | | 59 | 1st |
| 1970 | Gold Leaf Team Lotus | Lotus 49C; Lotus 72; Lotus 72B; Lotus 72C | Cosworth DFV 3.0 V8 | F | (United Kingdom) John Miles | 5 | DNQ | DNQ | Ret | 7 | 8 | Ret | Ret | Ret | DNS | | | | 59 | 1st |
| 1970 | Gold Leaf Team Lotus | Lotus 49C; Lotus 72; Lotus 72B; Lotus 72C | Cosworth DFV 3.0 V8 | F | (Brazil) Emerson Fittipaldi | | | | | | | 8 | 4 | 15 | DNS | | 1 | Ret | 59 | 1st |
| 1970 | Gold Leaf Team Lotus | Lotus 49C; Lotus 72; Lotus 72B; Lotus 72C | Cosworth DFV 3.0 V8 | F | (Sweden) Reine Wisell | | | | | | | | | | | | 3 | NC | 59 | 1st |
| 1970 | Garvey Team Lotus | Lotus 49C; Lotus 72; Lotus 72B; Lotus 72C | Cosworth DFV 3.0 V8 | F | (Spain) Alex Soler-Roig | | DNQ | | | | | | | | | | | | 59 | 1st |
| 1970 | World Wide Racing | Lotus 49C; Lotus 72; Lotus 72B; Lotus 72C | Cosworth DFV 3.0 V8 | F | (Spain) Alex Soler-Roig | | | | DNS | | DNQ | | | | | | | | 59 | 1st |
| 1970 | Rob Walker Racing Team | Lotus 49C; Lotus 72C | Cosworth DFV 3.0 V8 | F | (United Kingdom) Graham Hill | 6 | 4 | | | | | | | | | | | | 59 | 1st |
| 1970 | Brooke Bond Oxo Racing – Rob Walker | Lotus 49C; Lotus 72C | Cosworth DFV 3.0 V8 | F | (United Kingdom) Graham Hill | | | 5 | Ret | NC | 10 | 6 | Ret | | DNS | NC | Ret | Ret | 59 | 1st |
| 1970 | Team Gunston | Lotus 49 | Cosworth DFV 3.0 V8 | D | (Rhodesia) John Love | 8 | | | | | | | | | | | | | 59 | 1st |
| 1970 | Scuderia Scribante | Lotus 49C | Cosworth DFV 3.0 V8 | F | (South Africa) Dave Charlton | 12 | | | | | | | | | | | | | 59 | 1st |
| 1970 | Pete Lovely Volkswagen Inc. | Lotus 49B | Cosworth DFV 3.0 V8 | F | (United States) Pete Lovely | | | | | DNQ | DNQ | NC | | | | | DNQ | | 59 | 1st |
| 1970 | Tyrrell Racing Organisation | March 701 | Cosworth DFV 3.0 V8 | D | (United Kingdom) Jackie Stewart | **3** | 1 | **Ret** | **Ret** | 2 | 9 | Ret | Ret | Ret | 2 | | | | 48 | 3rd |
| 1970 | Tyrrell Racing Organisation | March 701 | Cosworth DFV 3.0 V8 | D | (France) Johnny Servoz-Gavin | Ret | 5 | DNQ | | | | | | | | | | | 48 | 3rd |
| 1970 | Tyrrell Racing Organisation | March 701 | Cosworth DFV 3.0 V8 | D | (France) François Cevert | | | | | Ret | 11 | 7 | 7 | Ret | 6 | 9 | Ret | Ret | 48 | 3rd |
| 1970 | March Engineering | March 701 | Cosworth DFV 3.0 V8 | F | (New Zealand) Chris Amon | Ret | Ret | Ret | 2 | Ret | 2 | 5 | Ret | 8 | 7 | 3 | 5 | 4 | 48 | 3rd |
| 1970 | March Engineering | March 701 | Cosworth DFV 3.0 V8 | F | (Switzerland) Jo Siffert | 10 | DNQ | 8 | 7 | Ret | Ret | Ret | 8 | 9 | Ret | Ret | 9 | Ret | 48 | 3rd |
| 1970 | STP Corporation | March 701 | Cosworth DFV 3.0 V8 | F | (United States) Mario Andretti | Ret | 3 | | | | | Ret | Ret | Ret | | | | | 48 | 3rd |
| 1970 | Antique Automobiles Racing Team | March 701 | Cosworth DFV 3.0 V8 | G | (Sweden) Ronnie Peterson | | | 7 | NC | | | | | | | | | | 48 | 3rd |
| 1970 | Colin Crabbe Racing | March 701 | Cosworth DFV 3.0 V8 | G | (Sweden) Ronnie Peterson | | | | | 9 | Ret | 9 | Ret | | Ret | NC | 11 | | 48 | 3rd |
| 1970 | Hubert Hahne | March 701 | Cosworth DFV 3.0 V8 | F | (West Germany) Hubert Hahne | | | | | | | | DNQ | | | | | | 48 | 3rd |
| 1970 | Motor Racing Developments Ltd. | Brabham BT33 | Cosworth DFV 3.0 V8 | G | (Australia) Jack Brabham | 1 | **Ret** | 2 | Ret | 11 | 3 | 2 | Ret | 13 | Ret | Ret | 10 | Ret | 35 | 4th |
| 1970 | Auto Motor und Sport | Brabham BT33 | Cosworth DFV 3.0 V8 | G | (West Germany) Rolf Stommelen | Ret | Ret | DNQ | 5 | DNQ | 7 | DNS | 5 | 3 | 5 | Ret | 12 | Ret | 35 | 4th |
| 1970 | Team Gunston | Brabham BT26A | Cosworth DFV 3.0 V8 | G | (South Africa) Peter de Klerk | 11 | | | | | | | | | | | | | 35 | 4th |
| 1970 | Tom Wheatcroft Racing | Brabham BT26A | Cosworth DFV 3.0 V8 | G | (United Kingdom) Derek Bell | | | | Ret | | | | | | | | | | 35 | 4th |
| 1970 | Gus Hutchison | Brabham BT26A | Cosworth DFV 3.0 V8 | G | (United States) Gus Hutchison | | | | | | | | | | | | Ret | | 35 | 4th |
| 1970 | Bruce McLaren Motor Racing | McLaren M14A | Cosworth DFV 3.0 V8 | G | (New Zealand) Denny Hulme | 2 | Ret | 4 | | | 4 | 3 | 3 | Ret | 4 | Ret | 7 | 3 | 35 | 5th |
| 1970 | Bruce McLaren Motor Racing | McLaren M14A | Cosworth DFV 3.0 V8 | G | (New Zealand) Bruce McLaren | Ret | 2 | Ret | | | | | | | | | | | 35 | 5th |
| 1970 | Bruce McLaren Motor Racing | McLaren M14A | Cosworth DFV 3.0 V8 | G | (United Kingdom) Peter Gethin | | | | | Ret | | | Ret | 10 | NC | 6 | 14 | Ret | 35 | 5th |
| 1970 | Bruce McLaren Motor Racing | McLaren M14A | Cosworth DFV 3.0 V8 | G | (United States) Dan Gurney | | | | | Ret | 6 | Ret | | | | | | | 35 | 5th |
| 1970 | Ecurie Bonnier | McLaren M7C | Cosworth DFV 3.0 V8 | G | (Sweden) Jo Bonnier | | | | | | | | | | DNQ | | Ret | | 35 | 5th |
| 1970 | Team Surtees | McLaren M7C | Cosworth DFV 3.0 V8 | F | (United Kingdom) John Surtees | Ret | Ret | Ret | | 6 | | | | | | | | | 35 | 5th |
| 1970 | Team Surtees | Surtees TS7 | Cosworth DFV 3.0 V8 | F | (United Kingdom) John Surtees | | | | | | | Ret | 9 | Ret | Ret | 5 | Ret | 8 | 3 | 8th |
| 1970 | Team Surtees | Surtees TS7 | Cosworth DFV 3.0 V8 | F | (United Kingdom) Derek Bell | | | | | | | | | | | | 6 | | 3 | 8th |
| 1970 | Frank Williams Racing Cars | De Tomaso 505/38 | Cosworth DFV 3.0 V8 | D | (United Kingdom) Piers Courage | Ret | DNS | NC | Ret | Ret | | | | | | | | | 0 | — |
| 1970 | Frank Williams Racing Cars | De Tomaso 505/38 | Cosworth DFV 3.0 V8 | D | (United Kingdom) Brian Redman | | | | | | | DNS | DNQ | | | | | | 0 | — |
| 1970 | Frank Williams Racing Cars | De Tomaso 505/38 | Cosworth DFV 3.0 V8 | D | (Australia) Tim Schenken | | | | | | | | | Ret | Ret | NC | Ret | | 0 | — |
| 1970 | Tyrrell Racing Organisation | Tyrrell 001 | Cosworth DFV 3.0 V8 | D | (United Kingdom) Jackie Stewart | | | | | | | | | | | Ret | Ret | Ret | 0 | — |
| 1970 | Silvio Moser Racing Team | Bellasi F1 70 | Cosworth DFV 3.0 V8 | G | (Switzerland) Silvio Moser | | | | | DNQ | DNQ | | DNQ | Ret | DNQ | | | | 0 | — |
| 1971 | Elf Team Tyrrell | Tyrrell 001; Tyrrell 002; Tyrrell 003 | Cosworth DFV 3.0 V8 | G | | RSA | ESP | MON | NED | FRA | GBR | GER | AUT | ITA | CAN | USA | | | 73 | 1st |
| 1971 | Elf Team Tyrrell | Tyrrell 001; Tyrrell 002; Tyrrell 003 | Cosworth DFV 3.0 V8 | G | (United Kingdom) Jackie Stewart | **2** | 1 | **1** | 11 | **1** | 1 | **1** | Ret | Ret | **1** | **5** | | | 73 | 1st |
| 1971 | Elf Team Tyrrell | Tyrrell 001; Tyrrell 002; Tyrrell 003 | Cosworth DFV 3.0 V8 | G | (France) François Cevert | Ret | 7 | Ret | Ret | 2 | 10 | 2 | Ret | 3 | 6 | 1 | | | 73 | 1st |
| 1971 | Elf Team Tyrrell | Tyrrell 001; Tyrrell 002; Tyrrell 003 | Cosworth DFV 3.0 V8 | G | (United States) Peter Revson | | | | | | | | | | | Ret | | | 73 | 1st |
| 1971 | STP March Racing Team | March 711 | Cosworth DFV 3.0 V8 | F | (Sweden) Ronnie Peterson | 10 | Ret | 2 | 4 | | 2 | 5 | 8 | 2 | 2 | 3 | | | 33 (34) | 4th |
| 1971 | STP March Racing Team | March 711 | Cosworth DFV 3.0 V8 | F | (Spain) Alex Soler-Roig | Ret | Ret | DNQ | Ret | Ret | | | | | | | | | 33 (34) | 4th |
| 1971 | STP March Racing Team | March 711 | Cosworth DFV 3.0 V8 | F | (Italy) Nanni Galli | | | | | DNS | 11 | | | Ret | 16 | Ret | | | 33 (34) | 4th |
| 1971 | STP March Racing Team | March 711 | Cosworth DFV 3.0 V8 | F | (Austria) Niki Lauda | | | | | | | | Ret | | | | | | 33 (34) | 4th |
| 1971 | STP March Racing Team | March 711 | Cosworth DFV 3.0 V8 | F | (United Kingdom) Mike Beuttler | | | | | | | | | | NC | | | | 33 (34) | 4th |
| 1971 | Clarke-Mordaunt-Guthrie Racing | March 711 | Cosworth DFV 3.0 V8 | F | (United Kingdom) Mike Beuttler | | | | | | Ret | DSQ | NC | Ret | | | | | 33 (34) | 4th |
| 1971 | Frank Williams Racing Cars | March 701; March 711 | Cosworth DFV 3.0 V8 | F | (France) Henri Pescarolo | 11 | DNS | 8 | 13 | Ret | 4 | Ret | 6 | Ret | DNS | Ret | | | 33 (34) | 4th |
| 1971 | Frank Williams Racing Cars | March 701; March 711 | Cosworth DFV 3.0 V8 | F | (France) Max Jean | | | | | NC | | | | | | | | | 33 (34) | 4th |
| 1971 | Team Gunston | March 701 | Cosworth DFV 3.0 V8 | G | (Rhodesia) John Love | Ret | | | | | | | | | | | | | 33 (34) | 4th |
| 1971 | Gene Mason Racing | March 711 | Cosworth DFV 3.0 V8 | F | (United States) Skip Barber | | | DNQ | NC | | | | | | Ret | NC | | | 33 (34) | 4th |
| 1971 | Jo Siffert Automobiles | March 701 | Cosworth DFV 3.0 V8 | F | (France) François Mazet | | | | | 13 | | | | | | | | | 33 (34) | 4th |
| 1971 | Shell Arnold Team | March 701 | Cosworth DFV 3.0 V8 | F | (France) Jean-Pierre Jarier | | | | | | | | | NC | | | | | 33 (34) | 4th |
| 1971 | Gold Leaf Team Lotus | Lotus 72C; Lotus 72D | Cosworth DFV 3.0 V8 | F | (Brazil) Emerson Fittipaldi | Ret | Ret | 5 | | 3 | 3 | Ret | 2 | | 7 | NC | | | 21 | 5th |
| 1971 | Gold Leaf Team Lotus | Lotus 72C; Lotus 72D | Cosworth DFV 3.0 V8 | F | (Sweden) Reine Wisell | 4 | NC | Ret | DSQ | 6 | | 8 | 4 | | 5 | Ret | | | 21 | 5th |
| 1971 | Gold Leaf Team Lotus | Lotus 72C; Lotus 72D | Cosworth DFV 3.0 V8 | F | (South Africa) Dave Charlton | | | | | | Ret | | | | | | | | 21 | 5th |
| 1971 | Villiger Cigar Team Herbert Müller | Lotus 72 | Cosworth DFV 3.0 V8 | F | (Switzerland) Herbert Müller | | | | | | | | | DNA | | | | | 21 | 5th |
| 1971 | Pete Lovely Volkswagen Inc. | Lotus 69 | Cosworth DFV 3.0 V8 | F | (United States) Pete Lovely | | | | | | | | | | NC | NC | | | 21 | 5th |
| 1971 | Bruce McLaren Motor Racing | McLaren M14A; McLaren M19A | Cosworth DFV 3.0 V8 | G | (New Zealand) Denny Hulme | 6 | 5 | 4 | 12 | Ret | Ret | Ret | Ret | | 4 | Ret | | | 10 | 6th |
| 1971 | Bruce McLaren Motor Racing | McLaren M14A; McLaren M19A | Cosworth DFV 3.0 V8 | G | (United Kingdom) Peter Gethin | Ret | 8 | Ret | NC | 9 | Ret | Ret | | | | | | | 10 | 6th |
| 1971 | Bruce McLaren Motor Racing | McLaren M14A; McLaren M19A | Cosworth DFV 3.0 V8 | G | (United Kingdom) Jackie Oliver | | | | | | Ret | | 9 | 7 | | | | | 10 | 6th |
| 1971 | Ecurie Bonnier | McLaren M7C | Cosworth DFV 3.0 V8 | G | (Sweden) Jo Bonnier | Ret | | | | | | DNQ | DNS | 10 | | 16 | | | 10 | 6th |
| 1971 | Ecurie Bonnier | McLaren M7C | Cosworth DFV 3.0 V8 | G | (Austria) Helmut Marko | | | | | | | DNS | | | | | | | 10 | 6th |
| 1971 | Penske-White Racing | McLaren M19A | Cosworth DFV 3.0 V8 | G | (United States) Mark Donohue | | | | | | | | | | 3 | DNS | | | 10 | 6th |
| 1971 | Penske-White Racing | McLaren M19A | Cosworth DFV 3.0 V8 | G | (United Kingdom) David Hobbs | | | | | | | | | | | 10 | | | 10 | 6th |
| 1971 | Brooke Bond Oxo Team Surtees | Surtees TS7; Surtees TS9 | Cosworth DFV 3.0 V8 | F | (United Kingdom) John Surtees | Ret | 11 | 7 | 5 | 8 | 6 | 7 | Ret | Ret | 11 | 17 | | | 8 | 8th |
| 1971 | Auto Motor und Sport Team Surtees | Surtees TS7; Surtees TS9 | Cosworth DFV 3.0 V8 | F | (West Germany) Rolf Stommelen | 12 | Ret | 6 | DSQ | 11 | 5 | 10 | 7 | DNS | Ret | | | | 8 | 8th |
| 1971 | Team Surtees | Surtees TS7; Surtees TS9 | Cosworth DFV 3.0 V8 | F | (United Kingdom) Brian Redman | 7 | | | | | | | | | | | | | 8 | 8th |
| 1971 | Team Surtees | Surtees TS7; Surtees TS9 | Cosworth DFV 3.0 V8 | F | (United Kingdom) Derek Bell | | | | | | Ret | | | | | | | | 8 | 8th |
| 1971 | Team Surtees | Surtees TS7; Surtees TS9 | Cosworth DFV 3.0 V8 | F | (United Kingdom) Mike Hailwood | | | | | | | | | 4 | | 15 | | | 8 | 8th |
| 1971 | Team Surtees | Surtees TS7; Surtees TS9 | Cosworth DFV 3.0 V8 | F | (United States) Sam Posey | | | | | | | | | | | Ret | | | 8 | 8th |
| 1971 | Team Surtees | Surtees TS7; Surtees TS9 | Cosworth DFV 3.0 V8 | F | (Netherlands) Gijs van Lennep | | | | | | | | | | | DNS | | | 8 | 8th |
| 1971 | Stichting Autoraces Nederland | Surtees TS7 | Cosworth DFV 3.0 V8 | F | (Netherlands) Gijs van Lennep | | | | 8 | | | | | | | | | | 8 | 8th |
| 1971 | Motor Racing Developments Ltd. | Brabham BT33; Brabham BT34 | Cosworth DFV 3.0 V8 | G | (United Kingdom) Graham Hill | 9 | Ret | Ret | 10 | Ret | Ret | 9 | 5 | Ret | Ret | 7 | | | 5 | 9th |
| 1971 | Motor Racing Developments Ltd. | Brabham BT33; Brabham BT34 | Cosworth DFV 3.0 V8 | G | (South Africa) Dave Charlton | Ret | | | | | | | | | | | | | 5 | 9th |
| 1971 | Motor Racing Developments Ltd. | Brabham BT33; Brabham BT34 | Cosworth DFV 3.0 V8 | G | (Australia) Tim Schenken | | 9 | 10 | Ret | 12 | 12 | 6 | 3 | Ret | Ret | Ret | | | 5 | 9th |
| 1971 | Team Gunston | Brabham BT26A | Cosworth DFV 3.0 V8 | G | (South Africa) Jackie Pretorius | Ret | | | | | | | | | | | | | 5 | 9th |
| 1971 | Ecurie Evergreen | Brabham BT33 | Cosworth DFV 3.0 V8 | G | (United Kingdom) Chris Craft | | | | | | | | | | DNQ | Ret | | | 5 | 9th |
| 1971 | Jolly Club of Switzerland | Bellasi F1 70 | Cosworth DFV 3.0 V8 | G | (Switzerland) Silvio Moser | | | | | | | | | Ret | | | | | 0 | — |
| 1972 | John Player Team Lotus | Lotus 72D | Cosworth DFV 3.0 V8 | F | | ARG | RSA | ESP | MON | BEL | FRA | GBR | GER | AUT | ITA | CAN | USA | | 61 | 1st |
| 1972 | John Player Team Lotus | Lotus 72D | Cosworth DFV 3.0 V8 | F | (Brazil) Emerson Fittipaldi | Ret | 2 | 1 | **3** | **1** | 2 | 1 | Ret | **1** | 1 | Ret | 11 | | 61 | 1st |
| 1972 | John Player Team Lotus | Lotus 72D | Cosworth DFV 3.0 V8 | F | (Australia) David Walker | DSQ | 10 | 9 | 14 | 14 | 18 | Ret | Ret | Ret | | | Ret | | 61 | 1st |
| 1972 | John Player Team Lotus | Lotus 72D | Cosworth DFV 3.0 V8 | F | (Sweden) Reine Wisell | | | | | | | | | | | Ret | 10 | | 61 | 1st |
| 1972 | Scribante Lucky Strike Racing | Lotus 72D | Cosworth DFV 3.0 V8 | F | (South Africa) Dave Charlton | | Ret | | | | DNQ | Ret | Ret | | | | | | 61 | 1st |
| 1972 | Elf Team Tyrrell | Tyrrell 002; Tyrrell 003; Tyrrell 004; Tyrrell 005; Tyrrell 006 | Cosworth DFV 3.0 V8 | G | (United Kingdom) Jackie Stewart | 1 | **Ret** | Ret | 4 | | 1 | 2 | 11 | 7 | Ret | 1 | **1** | | 51 | 2nd |
| 1972 | Elf Team Tyrrell | Tyrrell 002; Tyrrell 003; Tyrrell 004; Tyrrell 005; Tyrrell 006 | Cosworth DFV 3.0 V8 | G | (France) François Cevert | Ret | 9 | Ret | NC | 2 | 4 | Ret | 10 | 9 | Ret | Ret | 2 | | 51 | 2nd |
| 1972 | Elf Team Tyrrell | Tyrrell 002; Tyrrell 003; Tyrrell 004; Tyrrell 005; Tyrrell 006 | Cosworth DFV 3.0 V8 | G | (France) Patrick Depailler | | | | | | NC | | | | | | 7 | | 51 | 2nd |
| 1972 | Yardley Team McLaren | McLaren M19A; McLaren M19C | Cosworth DFV 3.0 V8 | G | (New Zealand) Denny Hulme | 2 | 1 | Ret | 15 | 3 | 7 | 5 | Ret | 2 | 3 | 3 | 3 | | 47 (49) | 3rd |
| 1972 | Yardley Team McLaren | McLaren M19A; McLaren M19C | Cosworth DFV 3.0 V8 | G | (United States) Peter Revson | Ret | 3 | 5 | | 7 | | 3 | | 3 | 4 | **2** | 18 | | 47 (49) | 3rd |
| 1972 | Yardley Team McLaren | McLaren M19A; McLaren M19C | Cosworth DFV 3.0 V8 | G | (United Kingdom) Brian Redman | | | | 5 | | 9 | | 5 | | | | | | 47 (49) | 3rd |
| 1972 | Yardley Team McLaren | McLaren M19A; McLaren M19C | Cosworth DFV 3.0 V8 | G | (South Africa) Jody Scheckter | | | | | | | | | | | | 9 | | 47 (49) | 3rd |

== See also ==
- Yamaha OX77 engine
