= Rowland Smith (industrialist) =

British automotive industrialist

Sir Alexander Rowland Smith
- Born: January 25, 1888; Gillingham, Kent, United Kingdom
- Died: April 19, 1988 (aged 100); Uckfield, East Sussex
- Occupation(s): industrialist, business executive
- Known for: British automotive executive who was responsible for the manufacture of the Merlin engine during World War II
- Spouse: Janet Lucretia Baker (m. 1913)
- Children: 2

Sir Alexander Rowland Smith (25 January 1888 - 19 April 1988) was a British automotive industrialist and Ford executive, who was responsible for the Ford plant in Manchester making around 34,000 Rolls-Royce Merlin engines during World War II; for this feat he was knighted in June 1944.

== Early life ==
Smith was born in Gillingham, Kent to Martha Blaker Challis (1857–1940) and Alexander James Frederick Smith (1859–1943). His parents were married at South Ockendon Chapel on 29 January 1887.

== Career ==
=== Ford ===
Smith was mostly responsible for the Merlin engine being built by Ford during the war (around 34,000 were built by Ford in Manchester, between June 1941 and November 1945); he was knighted for this work in the 1944 Birthday Honours.

He wanted women workers to build the Merlin engines, as he believed that engine assembly was work that women were suited for, but the Ministry of Aviation at first profoundly disagreed, but it worked well. He worked with Patrick Hennessy and Stanford Cooper, who were also knighted (in the 1941 Birthday Honours for Hennessy, and in the 1945 Birthday Honours for Cooper). Around 400 Merlin engines, per week, were being made.

The £6.6m factory at Urmston began construction in February 1940, and was finished by June 1940. There were 17,300 workers, with around 7,000 women.

Smith became managing director of Ford of Britain in 1941. He became chairman in 1950, leaving in 1956.

== Personal life ==
Smith lived at 'Oldbury Place' in Ightham, Kent.

Smith married Janet Lucretia Baker (1889 - 24 September 1972) in 1913.

Smith's daughter, Daphne Mary Smith (1914–2000), married at St Clement Danes church to Donald Maclean, of Bournemouth; they married on 28 May 1937. His daughter remarried around 1943. He had a son, Alexander Penrhyn Rowland Smith (1918–1989), who lived at Hatherleigh.

Rowland Smith died aged 100 in Uckfield, East Sussex.
