= Leonard Crossland =

British automobile executive

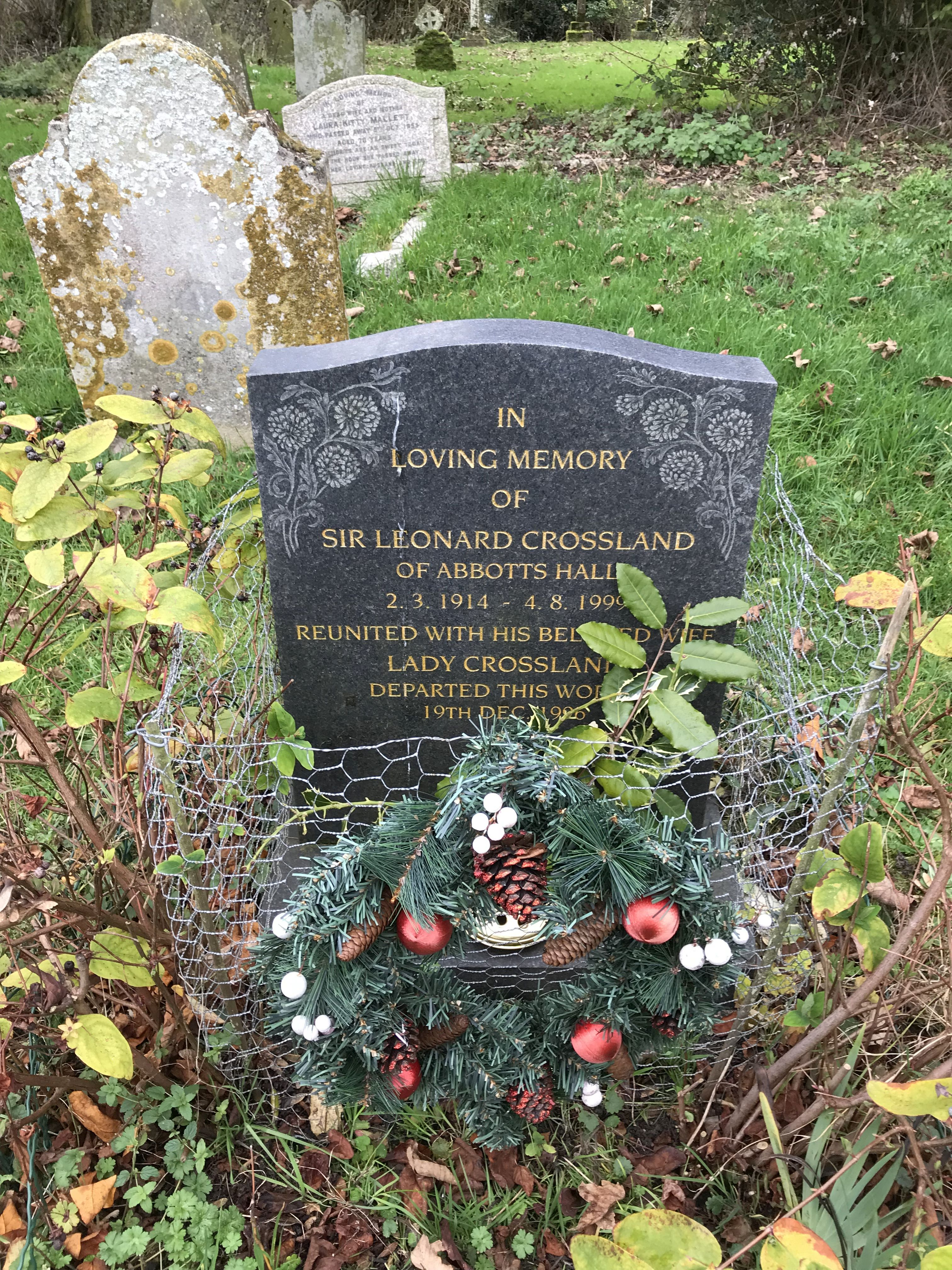
The grave of Leonard Crossland in the churchyard of St Stephen

Sir Leonard Crossland (2 March 1914 – 5 August 1999) was an English automobile executive who filled a succession of increasingly high level appointments with Ford of Britain, culminating with the chairmanship which he held between 1968 and 1972.

Born in Yorkshire and having attended Penistone Grammar School, Crossland joined Ford in 1937 and worked in the purchasing function until 1939 before leaving to join the British Royal Army Service Corps between 1939 and 1945: these were, for Britain, the years of the Second World War. Following a series of promotions his appointment as Managing Director, in succession to Stanley Gillen, was announced in June 1967. In May 1968, on the official retirement of Sir Patrick Hennessy, Crossland was elected to the Chairmanship. After his Ford chairmanship, he acquired several subsequent directorships in the auto-sector.

Crossland married in 1941 to Rhona Marjorie Griffin. The marriage produced two recorded daughters. He was also married to Joan Brewer who was the sister of Beryl Gilliat married to the writer and film director Sidney Gilliat, and therefore related to Amanda Eliasch and Toby Brown.

He died in Great Wigborough, Essex on 5 August 1999 at the age of 85 and was buried in the churchyard of St Stephen.
