= Dennis Ayling =

British cinematographer (1917–1998)

- Born: Dennis Leslie Ayling; 23 June 1917; Finchley, London, England, United Kingdom
- Died: 24 October 1998 (aged 81); Ealing, London, England, United Kingdom
- Other name: Denny Ayling
- Occupation: Cinematographer
- Years active: 1937–early 1990s

Dennis Ayling BSC (23 June 1917 – 24 October 1998) was a British cinematographer. He is best known for his miniature effects cinematography for the 1979 science fiction film Alien, for which he won an Academy Award for Best Visual Effects.

Ayling had a long career of more than 50 years as a film and television commercial cinematographer, and as a cinematographer and director of documentaries.

He also served in photographic reconnaissance squadrons in the Royal Air Force and Royal Canadian Air Force during World War II, and for part of his service was based in Burma, where he covered many key events, including the Japanese surrender.

== Filmography ==
Cinematographer

- The Cool Mikado (1963)
- Money Sings (short) (1963)
- Jugglers and Acrobats (documentary short) (1964)
- 9 Days in Summer (documentary, as Denny Ayling) (1967)
- Cucumber Castle (television movie, uncredited) (1970)
- Mr Tumbleweed (television movie) (1971)

Visual Effects

- Alien (director of photography: miniature effects, as Denys Ayling) (1979)

Director

- Men on Wheels (documentary short) (1961)
