= Walter Hayes =

English journalist (1924–2000)

Walter Leopold Arthur Hayes CBE
- Born: 12 April 1924; Harrow, London, England
- Died: 26 December 2000 (aged 76); Shepperton, Surrey, England
- Occupations: journalist, public relations executive at Ford
- Spouse: Elizabeth Holland
- Children: 3

Walter Leopold Arthur Hayes CBE (12 April 1924 – 26 December 2000) was an English journalist, and later public relations executive for Ford.

Hayes was key in developing Ford's Formula One program, by signing Jackie Stewart and funding the building of the Cosworth DFV V8 Formula One racing engine; and the creation of the Premier Automotive Group with the purchases of classic English brands Jaguar and Aston Martin.

== Biography ==
Walter Leopold Arthur Hayes was born in Harrow, Middlesex, the eldest child of lithographer Walter Leopold Hayes and Hilda Beatrice Fisher. Hayes won a scholarship to Hampton School, and served in the Royal Air Force, where he was a cadet pilot. and educator.

=== Journalist ===
After World War II, as the son of a lithographer Hayes found entry to Fleet Street relatively easy through the network of printing chapels, which controlled newspaper production in the United Kingdom at the time.

Working his way up through the defined path of local, regional and national journalistic work; dedicated pipe smoker Hayes became associate editor of the Daily Mail and in 1956 and at the age of 32, the last editor of the "Sunday Dispatch" newspaper. Looking for something different to revive the motoring column, he was introduced to Lotus Cars owner Colin Chapman, who became an occasional contributor and commentator.

=== Ford ===
Married with a son and resident at the time in Surrey, Hayes was seeking a secure future for his family when Ford asked him whether he would become head of Ford UK's public relations department. Although it meant crossing the tracks and probably never returning to journalism due to the prejudices at the time, Hayes accepted the job as head in January 1962. Ford had a series of dour but reliable products, including the Ford Cortina and Ford Zodiac. Hayes concluded that a push into racing and competition was key to developing the image, and in his very first weeks in his job he gave the go-ahead for his first motor sport activity with support for the successful private entrant Tony Brookes attack on six International class G World records at Montlhery with the 105E Anglia. Two years later he supported the same team in capturing 13 World Records in International class F with a Corsair GT at Monza. Under the project and campaign brand of "Total Performance" the thrust of Ford worldwide. was so successful, Hayes elevated Ford's public perception from that of vaguely sinister giant of car manufacturing to purveyor of cars which, while resolutely egalitarian, oozed speed, power, guts and sex appeal.

==== Racing ====
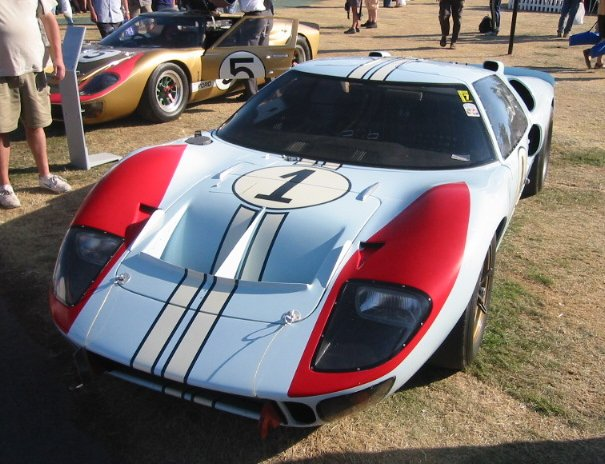
The Ford GT40, an early input to Ford's PR from Hayes

One of the first crises Hayes had to deal with was the fallout of Ferrari's rejection of the proposed Ford takeover. Hayes became part of the team that supported Henry Ford II's thoughts that Ford should take on Ferrari directly in their own home market of racing. Hayes initiated discussion with Cooper which didn't come to fruition; but agreements with Lotus resulted in a successful Indianapolis 500 program, and with Lola to design, engineer and produce the prototypes of the all conquering Ford GT40.

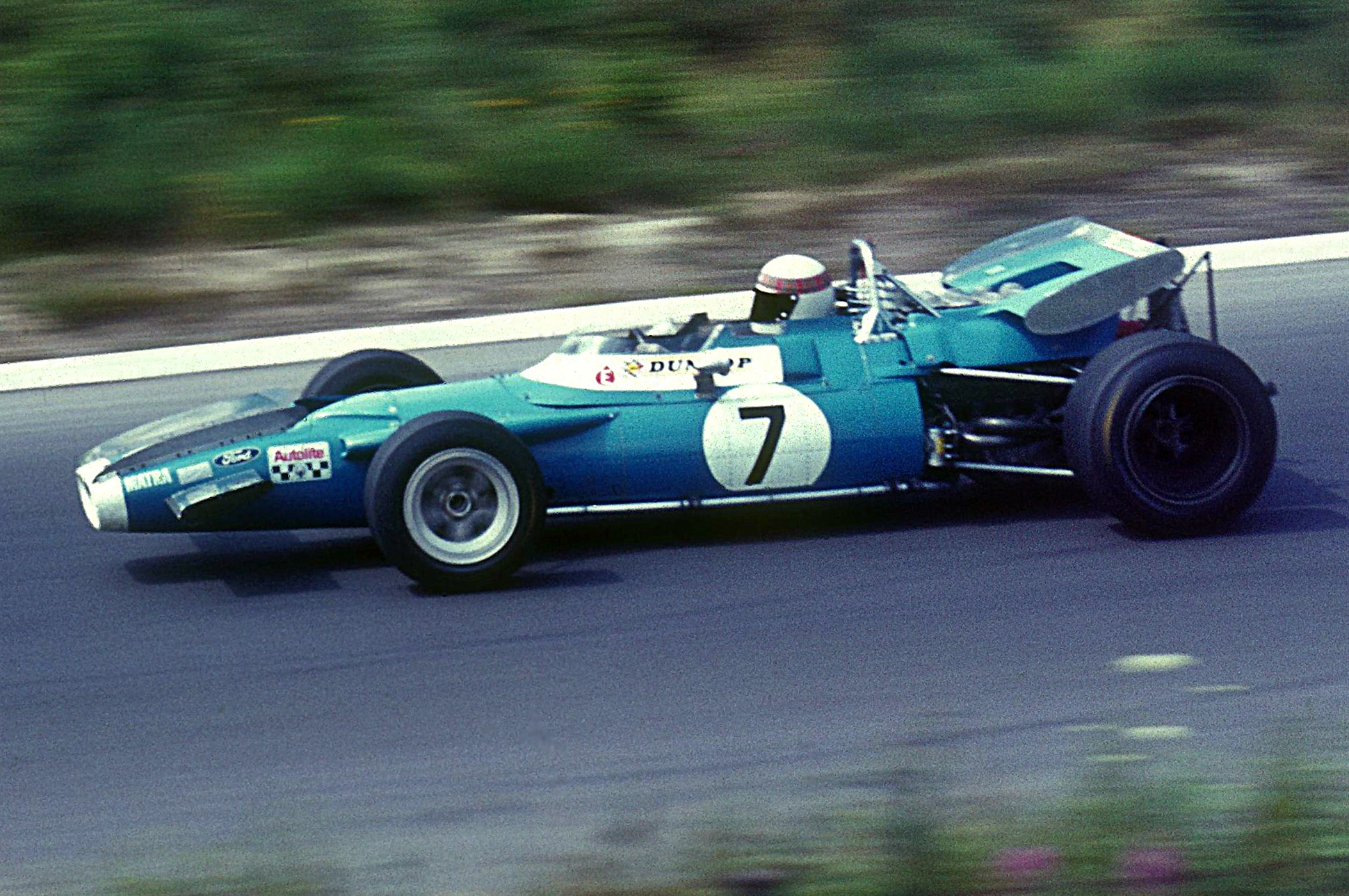
Jackie Stewart in the Matra-Cosworth at the Nürburgring in 1969

As well as reviving the rallying program, one of Hayes first accomplishments was to sign relatively unknown Scottish racing driver Jackie Stewart. Stewart was attending the 1964 British International Motor Show at Earl's Court, London, when Hayes approached him and later offered Stewart £500 to promote Ford products in 1965, along with the white Ford Zodiac that was the centrepiece of Ford's exhibit to drive that year. Stewart later commented: "I didn’t know who Walter Hayes was, but I did know that to have a contract with Ford Motor Company was a big deal with great opportunities for the future, even though I wasn’t yet aware that Ford would enter Formula One". The relationship was to last forty years, and be so successful it was the model for other Formula One stars and motor manufacturers.

==== Cosworth DFV ====
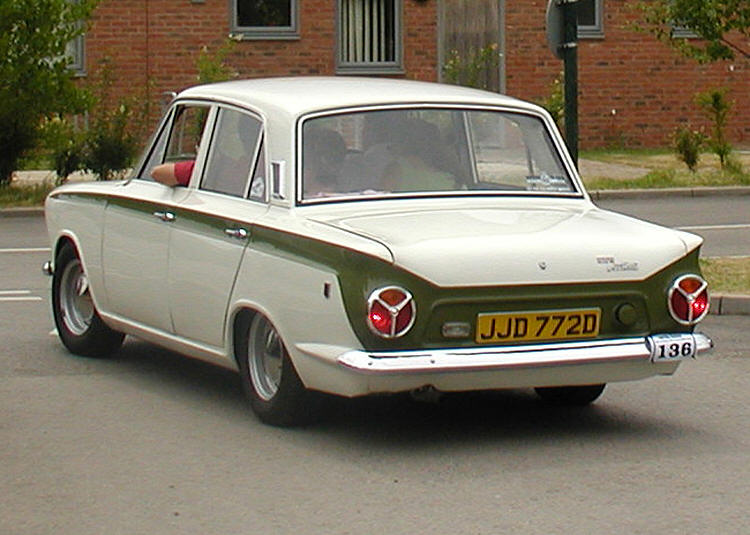
The Lotus Cortina, a product of Lotus Cars co-operation with Ford thanks to Hayes

Hayes next project came about as an approach from Colin Chapman. Chapman's cars had until that point relied on power from fast revving Coventry Climax engines, but with the change in Formula One regulations to three litre capacity from 1966, Coventry Climax decided for business reasons not to develop a large capacity engine. Chapman had approach the fledgling Cosworth group, with Keith Duckworth commenting that he could produce a competitive three litre engine, given a development budget of £100,000.

Chapman approach Ford and also David Brown of Aston Martin, each without initial success. Hayes arranged dinner for Chapman with Harley Copp, an American engineer who had backed and engineered Ford's successful entry into NASCAR in the 1950s. Hayes and Copp developed a business plan, which was backed by Ford UK's new chairman Stanley Gillen, and approved by Ford's Detroit head office as a two part plan – stage one would produce a four-cylinder twin-cam engine for Formula Two; by May 1967, stage two would produce a V-8 Formula One unit. In return, Chapman agreed to engineer "specials" for Ford, the first of which was 1963's Lotus Cortina.

Revealed by Hayes in a PR launch in Detroit at the end of 1965, the Ford Cosworth DFV won its first race – the Dutch Grand Prix on 4 June 1967, in a Lotus 49 driven by Jim Clark. Graham Hill was in the team was at the specific request of Ford and Hayes, who wanted to be sure that a strong driving cadre would be seated ahead of their engines.

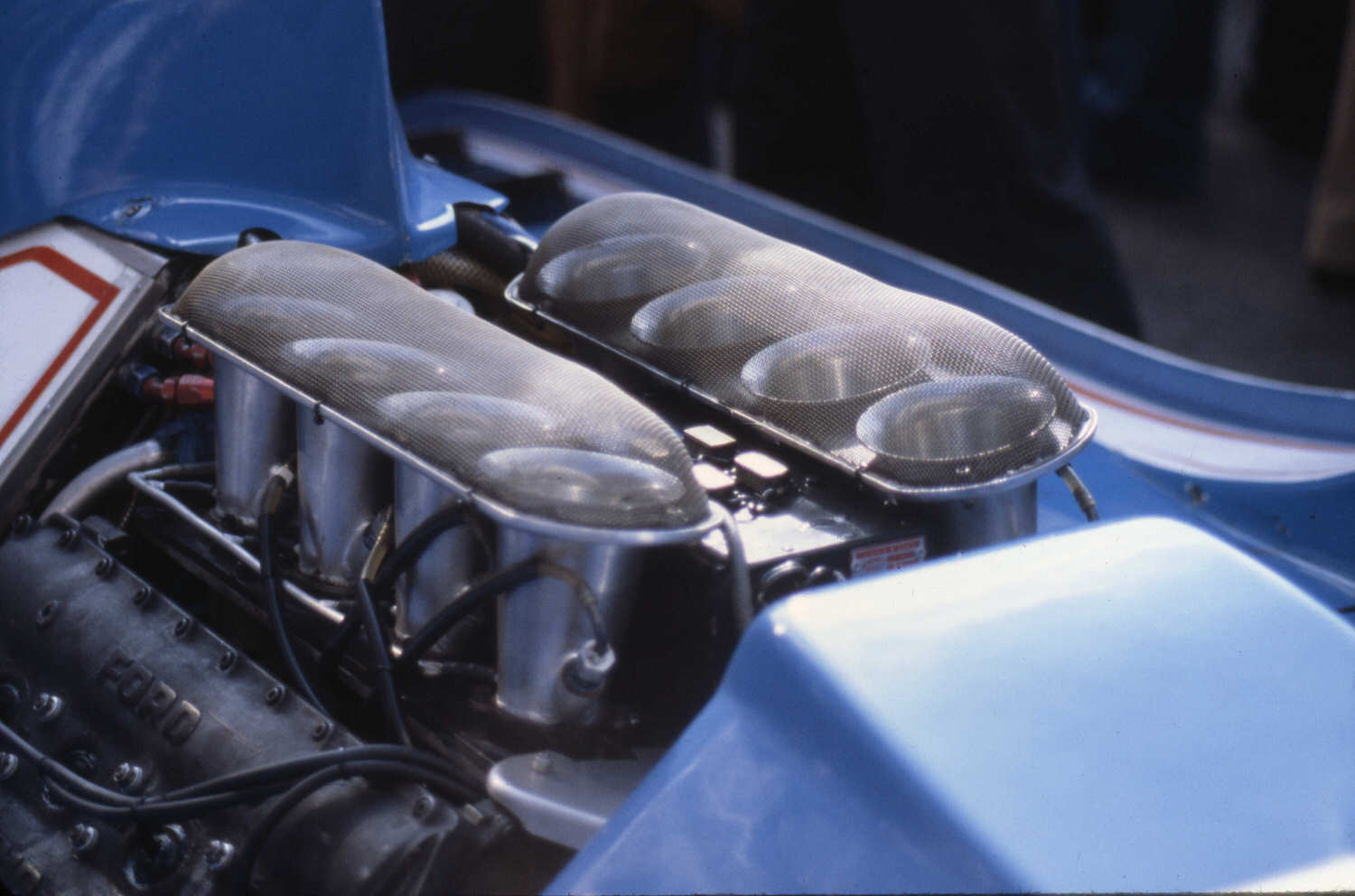
A later model Ford Cosworth DFV on a Ligier JS11

Initially, the agreement between Ford, Cosworth and Lotus was binding on all parties, and Ford as the funder had no plans to sell or hire the DFV to any other teams. However, it occurred to Hayes that there was no competition – the Ferrari was underpowered; the BRM complex and too heavy; the unreliable Maserati; Brabham was powered by the Oldsmobile-derived V8 Repco; the overweight Honda; while Dan Gurney's Eagle Weslake was beautiful, powerful and sleek, but often unreliable. Hayes concluded that Ford's name could become tarnished, and that they should agree to use the unit in other teams, and hence potentially dominate Formula One. Chapman, on the back of the pairs long friendship agreed, and Hayes could release the DFV initially to rival French team Matra, headed by Ken Tyrrell with Jackie Stewart as a driver.

Sixteen years later, The DFV-powered Tyrrell Racing car won the 1983 Detroit Grand Prix, the engine's 155th race victory.

At the start of the DFV project, Hayes told Henry Ford II that he thought the DFV engine was "fairly likely" to win a World Championship. In 1997 a group of people gathered at Donington Park to commemorate the DFV's 30th anniversary. Jackie Stewart said a few words, making comments on an engine which had made him as well as Graham Hill, Jochen Rindt, Emerson Fittipaldi, James Hunt, Mario Andretti, Alan Jones, Nelson Piquet and Keke Rosberg. It had also brought championships to teams: Lotus, Matra, Tyrrell, McLaren and Williams; and won races for Hesketh, March, Penske, Shadow and Wolf.

==== Henry Ford II ====
During the crisis of the Ferrari purchase/development of the GT40, and latterly the development of the Ford Cosworth DFV, Hayes would often meet with Henry Ford II. The pair got on well, and thanks to the success of the DFV, Henry appointed Hayes to the board of one of his major projects, the establishment of Ford of Europe at its founding in 1967.

Henry Ford II also trusted Hayes judgement, and when in February 1975, Ford was caught drunk-driving up a one- way street in Santa Barbara, Hayes suggested he use a Benjamin Disraeli quote for the waiting press: "Never complain, never explain."

Hayes was one of many who wrote a biography of Henry Ford II, writing "Henry: a memoir of Henry Ford II (1990)" in which he commented that Ford treated "housemaids and hotel maids and secretaries and drivers and the people in the plants like dukes and duchesses".

Hayes returned to Europe as vice-president of Ford of Europe, and became vice-chairman in 1976. In 1980 he was made a vice-president of the American parent under new Ford chairman Philip Caldwell, and moved to Detroit to head public affairs for the corporation. He launched new motorsports initiatives there, including the IMSA GTP projects. Hayes was appointed CBE for services to the motor industry in 1982.

=== Retirement? ===
When Caldwell retired, Hayes returned to Britain as vice-chairman of Ford of Europe. In 1989, Hayes was instrumental in setting up the Premier Automotive Group, when he agreed with a now English-homed Henry Ford II to purchase AC Cars, then a stake in Aston Martin, and then Jaguar Cars.

Hayes retired from Ford of Europe in December 1989.

=== Aston Martin ===
In May 1987, former RAF pilot Gauntlett and Prince Michael of Kent were staying at the home of Contessa Maggi, the wife of the founder of the original Mille Miglia, while watching the revival event – another house guest was Hayes. Despite problems over the previous acquisition of AC Cars, Hayes saw the potential of the brand and the discussion resulted in Ford taking a share holding in September 1987.

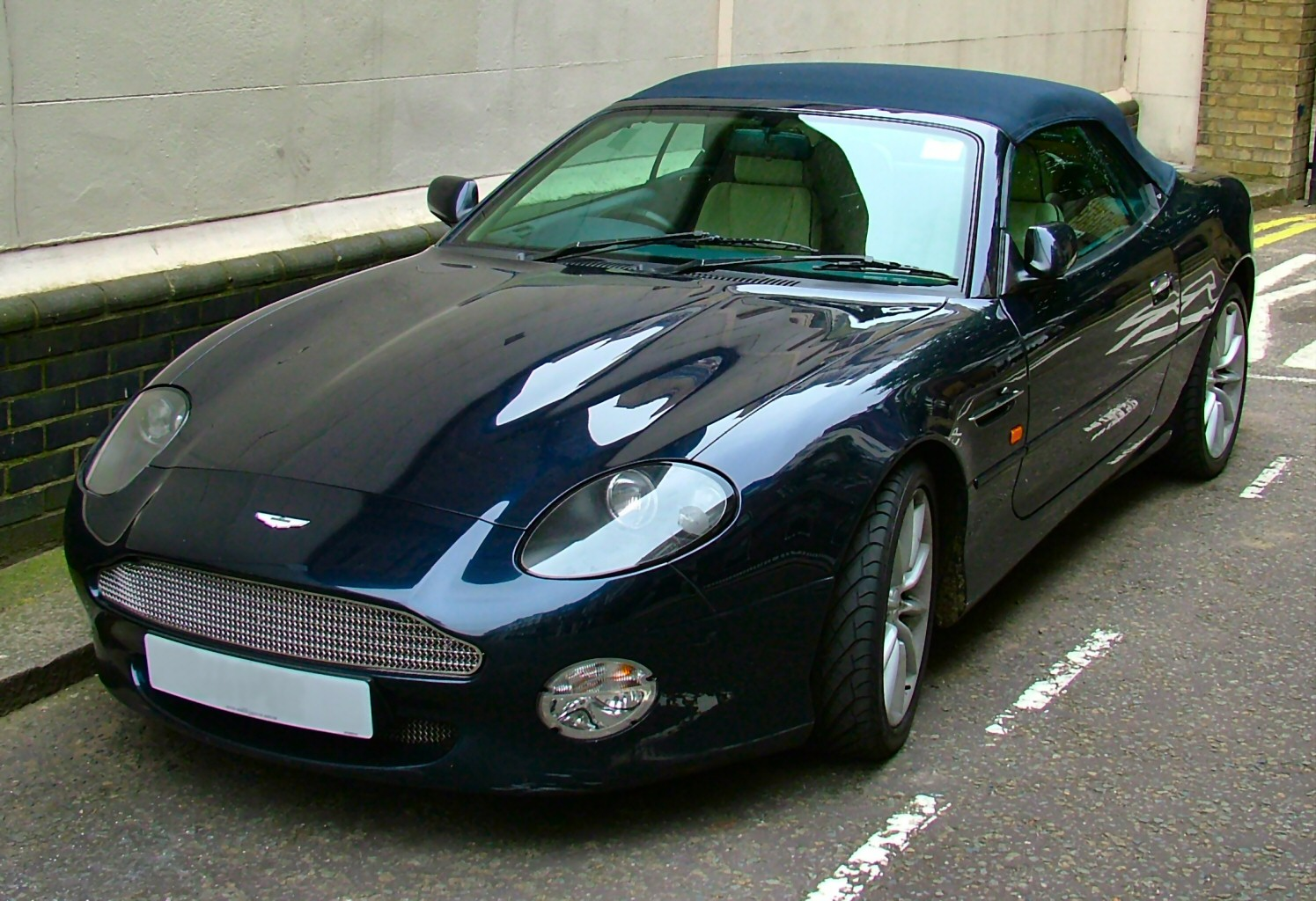
The "small Aston/DB7" released under Hayes chairman ship of Aston Martin

Hayes recognized the need for a higher-volume, lower cost Aston Martin, and under his guidance the plans for a DB7 were created and the car was brought into production. His first move was to shrewdly appointed the industrialist Sir David Brown, an enthusiastic backer of Aston Martin in its post-war glory days, as honorary life president – a small move that nonetheless did wonders for Aston's image among its heritage-conscious customers. In 1992, the Vantage version was announced, and the following year the company renewed the DB range by announcing the Jaguar XJS based, Tom Walkinshaw's TWR Group engineered "small Aston"/DB7 – which ensured survival by boosting production by 500%. Ford substantially invested in new manufacturing and quickly ramped-up production. In 1994, Ford opened a new factory at Banbury Road in Bloxham, after which Hayes retired again.

=== Family ===
Hayes lived at Battlecrease Hall in Shepperton; he and his wife Elizabeth (née Holland) had two sons and a daughter.

== Quotations ==
- "'That engine was literally done by Keith Duckworth, and he designed all the test rigs for it, too. And he allowed me to spend £100,000 in instalments. I think we should recognise it as a kind of foundation point in our life when we in a sense established this country – in an international fashion, not a silly flag-waving fashion – as the place where you go to have motor racing cars and engines made." Hayes to journalist John Blunsden at the 1997 30th birthday party of the DFV at Donington Park
- "It was a fair old gesture of confidence on my part. I hadn't been with the company all that amount of time, and I sort of hung my career on the line with that engine. In fact, I stuck my neck out a million miles. I must say, though, that frankly it never occurred to me that Keith's engine would be anything other than a tremendous success. He'd had such a good record all along, and we knew where he'd been." Hayes to journalist John Blunsden at the 1997 30th birthday party of the DFV at Donington Park
- "A man who had an unconventional approach, yet an outstandingly mature man." Stuart Turner, who had followed Hayes footsteps in leaving journalism for an industry role
- "He was always a gentleman of great dignity and style, and had this tremendous peripheral vision. He was involved in many prestigious charities and trusts, about which he rarely spoke, and besides being a great writer was probably the greatest public relations officer that the motor industry has ever had." Jackie Stewart on hearing of death of Hayes

== Bibliography ==
- Hayes, Walter (June 1990) "Henry: A Life of Henry Ford II", Grove Publishing. ISBN 0-8021-1285-4

Business positions
Preceded by Victor Gauntlett	Executive Chairman of Aston Martin; September 1991 – January 1994	Succeeded by John Oldfield
