= Harley Copp =

American automotive engineer

Harley F. Copp (1922 in Kansas – October 11, 1991 in San Clemente, California), was an American car designer and automotive safety consultant.

A 35-year veteran of the Ford Motor Company, Copp made his name leading the engineering design of various Ford products of the 1950s including the Continental Mark II in 1953 and the Falcon of 1959. Assigned to create the new Ford Engineering design unit in Brentwood, Essex in England, he led the design and engineering efforts around the Ford GT40 and the Ford Cosworth DFV race engine.

On his return to the United States, Copp had an internal view of the design work associated with the Ford Pinto, the production of which he disagreed with once the well documented safety problems were known. Copp resultantly resigned from Ford, and his subsequent articles and critic was successfully taken up by Ralph Nader. Copp spent the rest of his career as an automotive safety consultant, advising both automotive companies and legislators on suitable design and test solutions.

Copp died in San Clemente, California from complications from a stroke.

== Biography ==
Copp was born in Kansas, but grew up in Dearborn, Michigan. After graduating from the Edison Institute of Technology he joined the Ford Motor Company as an engineer, working on new car designs. As a side project, Copp backed and engineered Ford's successful entry into NASCAR in the 1950s.

=== Ford Continental ===
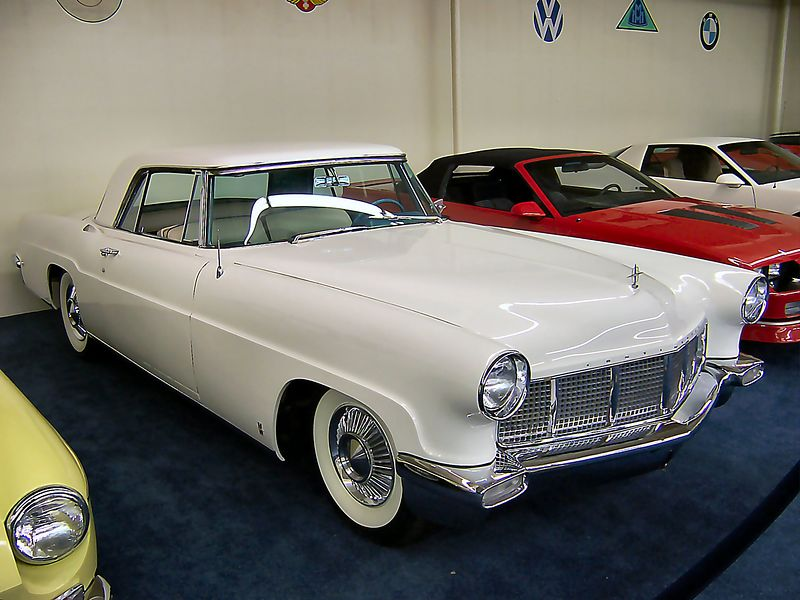
The Continental Mk2 design, led by Harley Copp

Copp first came to the fore of car design, when he was chosen as part of the team to revive the Continental as a superior and standalone up-market brand aside from Lincoln, to compete with General Motors Cadillac and Chrysler's DeSoto brands.

Having considered using an outside design team, Ford turned inside to their own Special Products Division. In Fall 1952, they designated John Reinhart as chief stylist, Gordon Buehrig as the chief body engineer assisted by Robert McGuffey Thomas; and Copp as chief engineer.

Ford had wanted to use unibody technology, but Copp argued against such a choice for a high-brand/low volume model, which was required to be delivered into sale in such a short time scale.

Handbuilt and resultantly expensive at USD10,000 on launch, the quickly redesigned 1959 MkIII was cheaper at $6,000, mostly because it recycled Lincoln parts and technology. The result was that the two products were difficult to differentiate within the customers mind, and resulted in the Continental marque being re-absorbed by Lincoln.

=== Ford Falcon ===
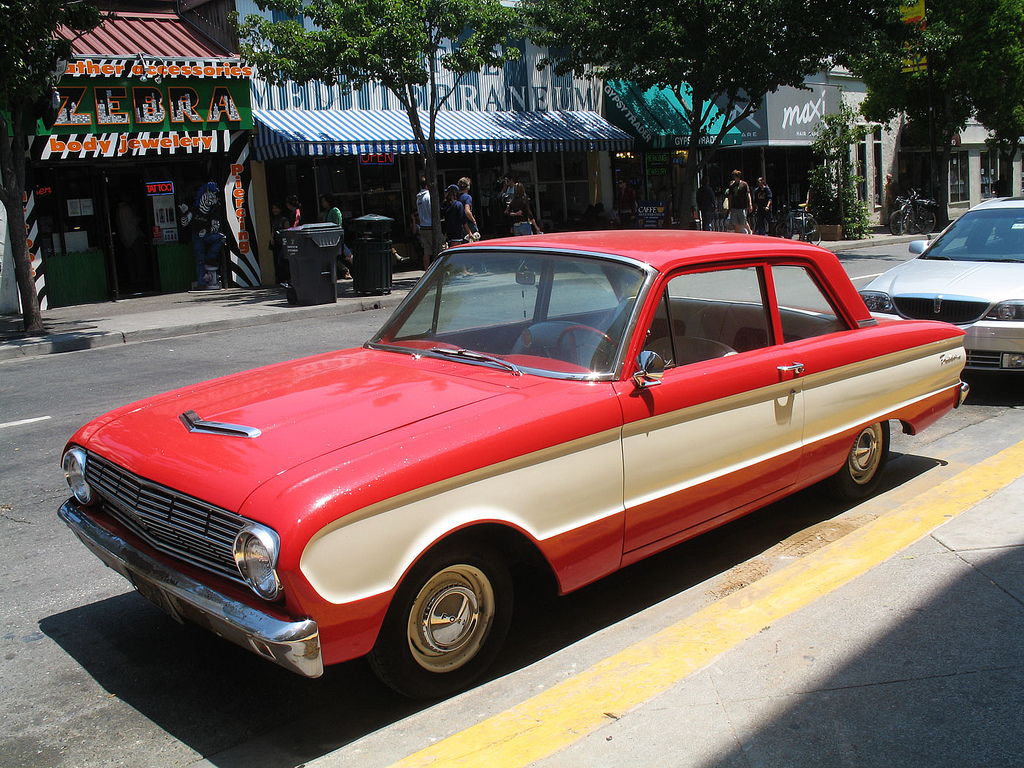
1963 Ford Falcon

By the late 1950s, Ford wanted to reduce its marketing spend on supplementary brands, and appeal to a wider number of car buyers. They commissioned a team to create what by American standards of the time a small car, but elsewhere in the world would be considered a mid-size car. With room for six passengers in reasonable comfort, to keep the price down Copp engineered a unibody, keeping suspension standard and sourced from Ford's existing parts bin: coil springs in front, leaf springs in the rear, drum brakes all round. It was powered by a small, lightweight 90 hp (67 kW), 144 CID (2.4 L) straight-6 with a single-barrel carburettor. A three-speed manual column shift was standard with the two-speed Ford-O-Matic automatic optionally available.

On launch, the first generation Falcon was available as a two and four-door sedans, two or four-door station wagons, and the Ranchero car-based pickup, transferred onto the Falcon platform for 1960 from the Fairlane. A Mercury derivative, the Mercury Comet, originally intended for the defunct Edsel marque, was launched in the US midway through the 1960 model year.

The market shift which spurred the development of the Falcon precipitated the demise of several well-established marques in the late-1950s and early-1960s. Besides the infamous tale of the Edsel, the Nash, Hudson, DeSoto and Packard nameplates all disappeared from the marketplace.

=== Ford UK and Brentwood ===
After the launch of the 1958 Continental and engineering for the 1960 Lincoln Continental, Copp left to set up a special vehicles engineering department in Europe. Ford had chosen Brentwood, Essex in England for the site, and Copp became Vice President Engineering, Ford of Britain.

==== MkIV Zephyr ====
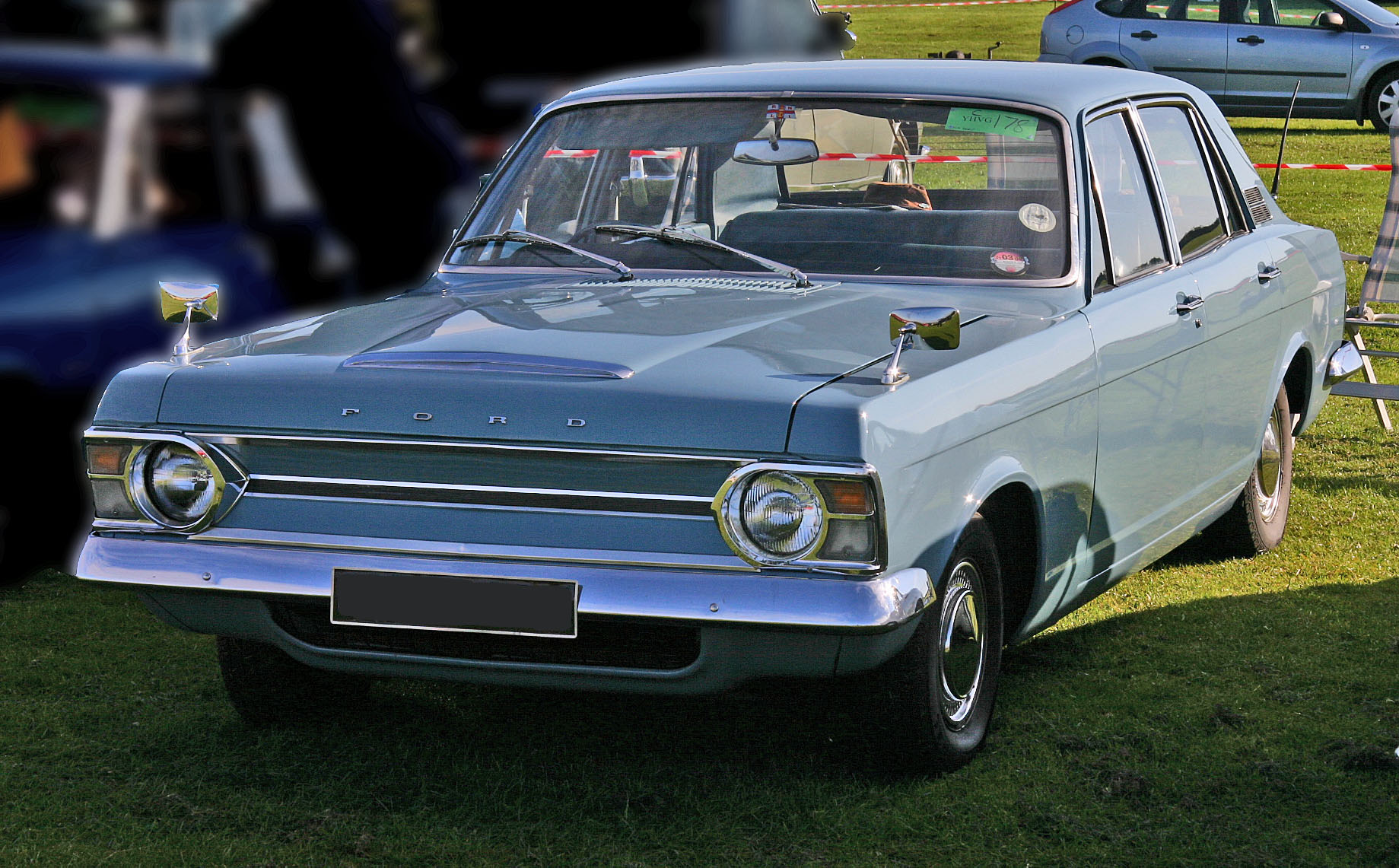
Ford Zephyr MkIV

In 1961, the first project Copp became involved in was project "Panda", which became the MkIV Zephyr/Zodiac range. As the car used the new V-series engines, the then traditional long bonnet concept created a problem until Copp required that the car was both larger and had more internal space, and came up with the idea of placing the spare wheel ahead of the radiator on an angle. The result was a vehicle of similar dimensions to the North American Ford Fairlane. Unfortunately, as the MkIV carried over so little engineering from the MkIII, Copp's insistence on independent rear suspension resulted in an alarming “tuck-under” of the outer rear wheel when cornering with the back seats empty. Neat “bow-back” styling made the capacious boot look deceptively short, but the large expanse of bonnet was unkindly likened to the landing deck of an aircraft carrier by some journalists.

==== Cosworth DFV ====
As Vice President Engineering, Ford of Britain, Copp oversaw the development of the Ford GT40 by Lola. However, his key input was on the Ford Cosworth DFV.

Colin Chapman's Lotus cars had until that point relied on power from fast revving Coventry Climax engines, but with the change in Formula One regulations to three litre capacity from 1966, Coventry Climax decided for business reasons not to develop a large capacity engine. Chapman had approached the fledgling Cosworth group, with Keith Duckworth commenting that he could produce a competitive three litre engine, given a development budget of £100,000.

Chapman approached Ford and also David Brown of Aston Martin, each without initial success. Chapman's friend and Ford Great Britain's PR director Walter Hayes arranged dinner for Chapman with Copp. Hayes and Copp developed a business plan, which was backed by Ford UK's new chairman Stanley Gillen, and approved by Ford's Detroit head office as a two-part plan - stage one would produce a four-cylinder twin-cam engine for Formula Two; by May 1967, stage two would produce a V-8 Formula One unit. In return, Chapman agreed to engineer "specials" for Ford, the first of which was 1963's Lotus Cortina.

Revealed by Hayes in a PR launch in Detroit at the end of 1965, the Ford Cosworth DFV won its first race - the Dutch Grand Prix on 4 June 1967, in a Lotus 49 driven by Jim Clark. Graham Hill was in the team at the specific request of Ford and Hayes, who wanted to be sure that a strong driving cadre would be seated ahead of their engines.

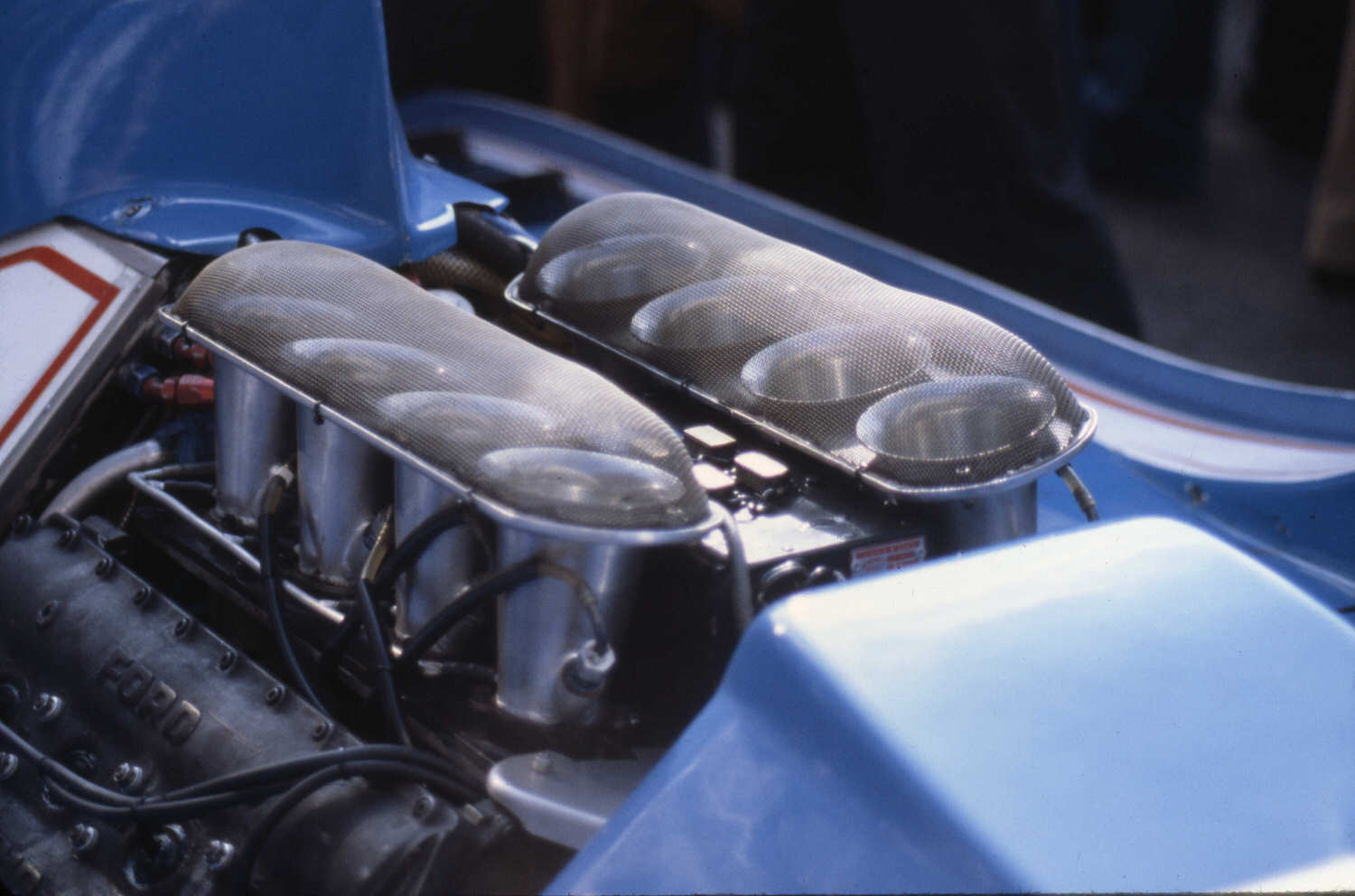
A later model Ford Cosworth DFV on a Ligier JS11

Initially, the agreement between Ford, Cosworth and Lotus was binding on all parties, and Ford as the funder had no plans to sell or hire the DFV to any other teams. However, it occurred to Hayes that there was no competition - the Ferrari was underpowered; the BRM complex and too heavy; the unreliable Maserati; Brabham was powered by the Oldsmobile-derived V8 Repco; the overweight Honda; while Dan Gurney's Eagle Weslake was beautiful, powerful and sleek, but often unreliable. Hayes concluded that Ford's name could become tarnished, and that they should agree to use the unit in other teams, and hence potentially dominate Formula One. Chapman, on the back of the pair's long friendship agreed, and Hayes could release the DFV initially to the rival French team Matra, headed by Ken Tyrrell with Jackie Stewart as a driver.

At the start of the DFV project, Hayes told Henry Ford II that he thought the DFV engine was "fairly likely" to win a World Championship. In 1997 a group of people gathered at Donington Park to commemorate the DFV's 30th anniversary. Jackie Stewart said a few words, making comments on an engine which had made him as well as Graham Hill, Jochen Rindt, Emerson Fittipaldi, James Hunt, Mario Andretti, Alan Jones, Nelson Piquet and Keke Rosberg. It had also brought championships to teams: Lotus, Matra, Tyrrell, McLaren and Williams; and won races for Hesketh, March, Penske, Shadow and Wolf.

==== Ford Cortina Mk3 ====
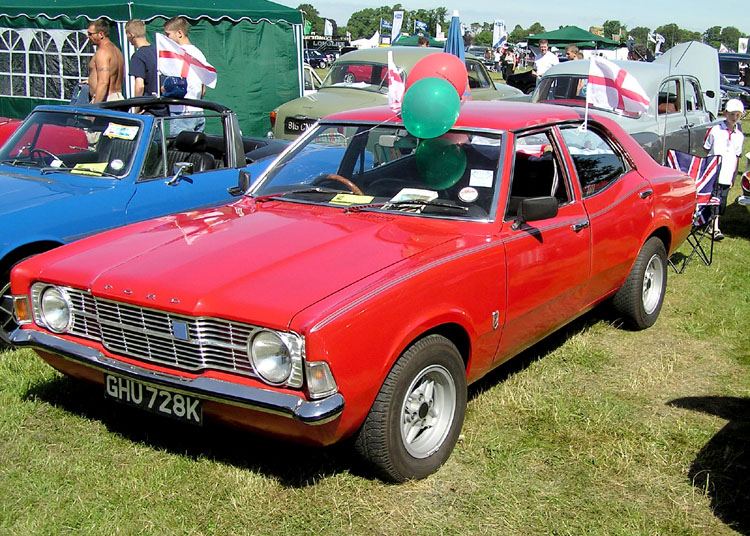
The Ford Cortina Mk3, with engineering led by Harley Copp at Brentwood

In the late 1960s, Ford set about developing a third-generation Cortina, which would be produced in higher volumes than before. It was the last European car engineered by Copp before he returned to Detroit.

The Mark III Detroit-inspired "coke bottle"-shaped Cortina TC was a hit amongst fleet buyers. It replaced both the Cortina Mark II and the larger, more expensive Ford Corsair by offering more trim levels and the option of larger engines than the Mark II.

The Mk II's MacPherson strut front suspension was replaced with more conventional double A-arm suspension to give the car a soft 'freeway' ride, which gave the larger engines distinct understeer.

== Ford Pinto ==
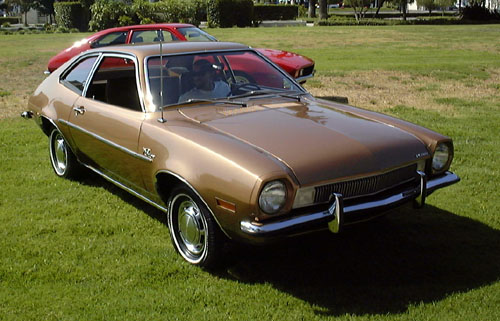
1971 Ford Pinto

In 1968, Copp returned to North America to head-up Ford's crash testing program team. By this time, the manufacturer preferred large American automobiles were losing market share to smaller more fuel efficient and reliable Japanese imports. As a result, CEO of the Ford Lee Iacocca wanted a 1971 model that weighed less than 2,000 pounds and that would be priced at less than $2,000.

== Safety consultant ==
After the Ford Pinto case, Copp took up the baton for compulsory vehicle testing, that was picked up through his work with Ralph Nader's Center for Auto Safety.

Copp spent the rest of his career as an automotive safety consultant, advising both automotive companies and legislators on suitable design and test solutions.

Copp died in San Clemente, California from complications from a stroke.
