= Patrick Hennessy (industrialist) =

- Born: 18 April 1898
- Died: 13 March 1981 (aged 82)
- Known for: Auto-industry executive
- Spouse: Dorothy Margaret Davis (m. 1923-1949; her death)

Sir Patrick Hennessy (18 April 1898 – 13 March 1981) was an Irish-born British industrialist, originally from County Cork. During the First World War he served in the British Army, between 1914 and 1918, with the Royal Inniskilling Fusiliers.

He started his career in 1920 with Henry Ford & Son in Cork. He relocated to England, by now a separate country, in 1931 when he was appointed Purchasing Manager with Ford of Britain. He was progressively promoted, appointed General Manager in 1939, Managing Director in 1948 and Chairman in 1956.

Hennessy combined the role of chairman with that of Chief Executive until 1963, retiring from the chairmanship at the age of 70 on 3 May 1968. His successor at Ford of Britain chairman was Leonard Crossland.

== Personal life ==
In 1923 he married Dorothy Margaret Davis of Boardmills, County Down. The couple had two sons and one daughter.

Patrick Hennessy was knighted in 1941. He died in West Essex early in 1981.
