= Stanley Gillen =

Stanley James Gillen (August 10, 1911 – July 1978) was an Ohio born automobile executive who filled a series with high level appointments in the United States and subsequently in Europe with the Ford Motor Company. Gillen joined the Ford Motor Company from General Motors in Michigan in 1947 and achieved rapid promotion through a series of administrative and executive appointments that included a period in Ford's defence products division, the tractor division, the steel division and the parts' division. Between 1962 and 1965 he was also Chairman of Autolite Motor Products Ltd, a Ford UK subsidiary and manufacturer of sparking plugs.

On 1 August 1965 he was appointed Managing Director and Chief Executive Officer at Ford of Britain in succession to J. Allen Barke. In 1967 he was appointed additionally a Vice-President of the Ford Motor Company: at this time he relinquished his job as managing Director at Ford of Britain, being succeeded by Leonard Crossland. Gillen moved to become Chairman and president of a new entity named Ford of Europe Inc, while retaining a Directorship at Ford of Britain. By this time the launch of the new Ford Escort, which would become the first post-war for to be manufactured and marketed simultaneously by Ford of Britain and Ford of Germany, was less than a year away. In 1971 Gillen retired from his senior positions at Ford.

Gillen married in 1935 to Mary Elizabeth Marks. The marriage produced three recorded daughters.
