= Alex Soler-Roig =

Spanish racing driver (born 1932)

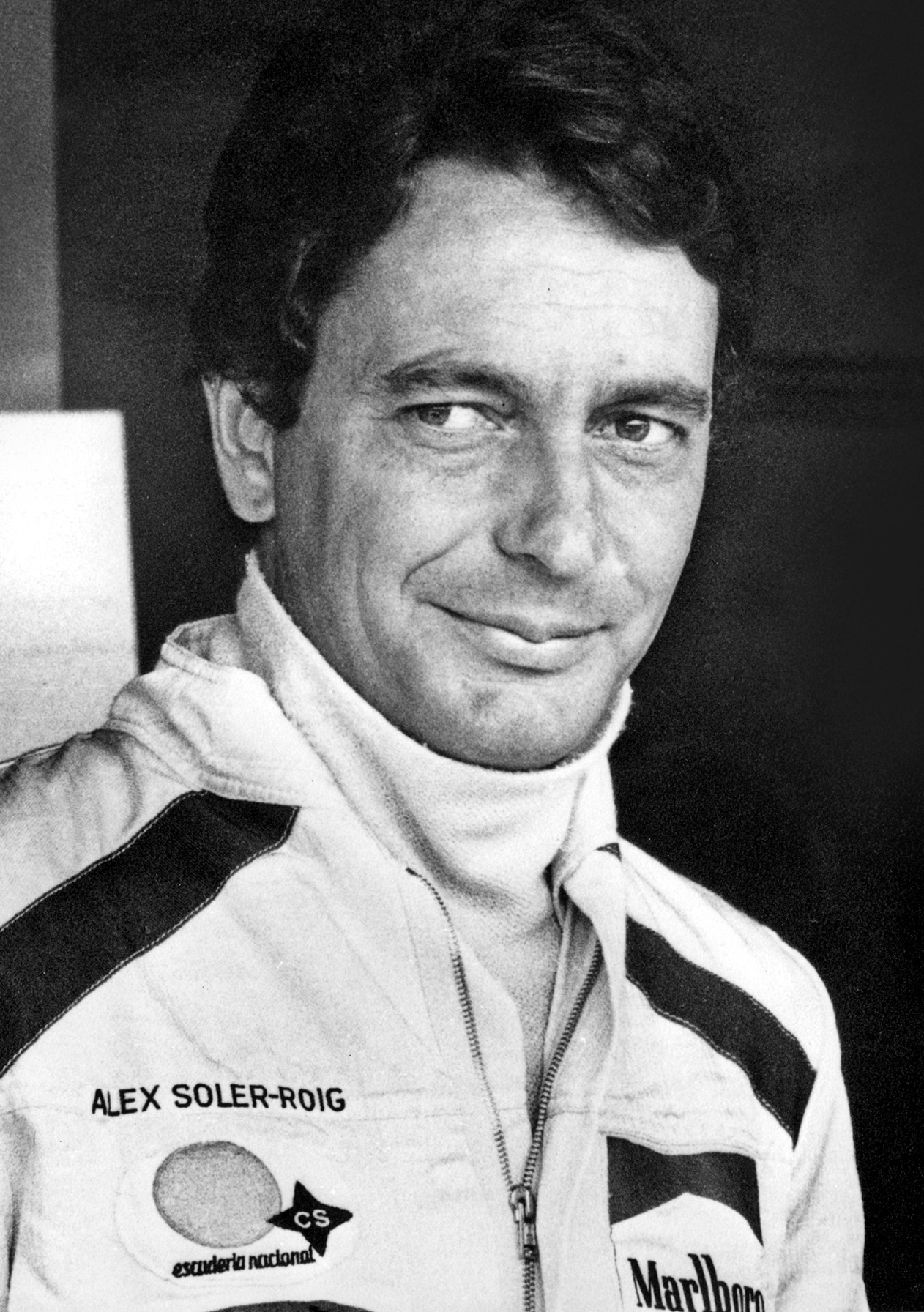
- Born: Alex Soler-Roig i Janer; 29 October 1932 (age 94); Barcelona, Catalonia, Spain
- Relatives: Daniel Juncadella (nephew)

Formula One World Championship career
- Nationality: (Spain) Spanish
- Active years: 1970–1972
- Team(s): Lotus, March, BRM
- Entries: 10 (6 starts)
- Championships: 0
- Wins: 0
- Podiums: 0
- Career points: 0
- Pole positions: 0
- Fastest laps: 0
- First entry: 1970 Spanish Grand Prix
- Last entry: 1972 Spanish Grand Prix

Championship titles
- Spanish GT–Sport Championship (1970); Campeonato de España de Turismos (1971, 1972); Major victories 24 Hours of Spa (1971); 12 Hours of Le Castellet (1971); 4 Hours of Zandvoort (1972); 24 Hours of Paul Ricard (1972); 4 Hours of Jarama (1972); 3 Hours of Montjuich (1972)

Alex Soler-Roig i Janer (Catalan pronunciation: [ˈaləks suˈle ˈrɔtʃ]; born 29 October 1932) is a former racing driver from Barcelona, Spain. He participated in 10 Formula One World Championship Grands Prix, debuting on 19 April 1970, and scored no championship points. He also participated in several non-championship Formula One races.

== Biography ==
Son of Dr. Soler-Roig, Alex began his career with motorcycles before entering the world of car racing, participating in rallies with Fiat and Porsche. His first victories came in 1958 at the Nuvolari trophy in Barcelona and the Rally Catalunya. This allowed him some sponsorship to enter the Monte Carlo Rally. In 1968 raced the 24 Hours of Le Mans with team Porsche driving a 907/6 Langheck and a year later in the 24 Hours of Daytona, where he led his class until his co-driver Rudy Lins had an accident. In the same year he finished 4th in the 12 Hours of Sebring with a Porsche 907. That same year enters the F2 championship driving a Lola, and in 1969 placed seventh in Barcelona Grand Prix in a Lotus F2 from Roy Winckelman Team led by Bernie Ecclestone. Achieved victories in several races with Jochen Rindt on the 6 Hours of Jarama and second in the 1000 km of Buenos Aires.

Soler-Roig's first race in Formula 1 was at the 1970 Spanish Grand Prix with a Lotus 49. Race organisers limited the race to 16 starters, resulting in Soler-Roig failing to qualify, despite lapping only a tenth of a second slower than Mario Andretti. However, on race morning there was a suggestion that the non-qualifiers might be allowed to start after all, so their cars were placed on the grid, only for the organisers to stick to their original decision, removing Soler-Roig's car from the grid as well as those of Jo Siffert and Andrea de Adamich. He subsequently participated at the Belgian Grand Prix, driving the Lotus 72 that was meant for Jochen Rindt. However, the car was not ready for Friday's practice and he only managed to complete three laps in Saturday's qualifying, and was therefore not allowed to start the race. His final Formula One outing for the season was another non-qualification at the French Grand Prix in a 49. He won the Spanish GT-Sport Championship that same year.

Soler-Roig started the 1971 season driving for the works March team, combining the Formula 1 Championship with the Spanish and German Touring Car championships with Ford Capri. He won the Spanish championship and finished fourth in Germany, but failed to finish any races in Formula 1.

Soler-Roig joined the Marlboro BRM F1 team for the 1972 season, but after a few races with problems in the car and the team, decided to spend the rest of the year racing the European Touring Car Championship with Ford, getting great results and victories in the 24 Hours of Spa, the 24 Hours of Paul Ricard, the 4 Hours of Zandvoort, 4 Hours of Jarama and the 3 Hours of Montjuich. His withdrawal from the world of competition occurred at the end of 1972, before his 41st birthday, to pursue his family business.

== Racing record ==
=== Complete Formula One World Championship results ===
(key)

Year	Entrant	Chassis	Engine	1	2	3	4	5	6	7	8	9	10	11	12	13	WDC	Points
1970	Garvey Team Lotus	Lotus 49C	Cosworth V8	RSA	ESP; DNQ												NC	0
1970	World Wide Racing	Lotus 49C	Cosworth V8						FRA; DNQ	GBR	GER	AUT	ITA	CAN	USA	MEX	NC	0
1970	World Wide Racing	Lotus 72C	Cosworth V8			MON	BEL; DNS	NED									NC	0
1971	STP March Racing Team	March 711	Cosworth V8	RSA; Ret	ESP; Ret	MON; DNQ	NED; Ret	FRA; Ret	GBR	GER	AUT	ITA	CAN	USA			NC	0
1972	España Marlboro BRM	BRM P160B	BRM V12	ARG; Ret	RSA	ESP; Ret	MON	BEL	FRA	GBR	GER	AUT	ITA	CAN	USA		NC	0

=== Complete Formula One non-championship results ===
(key)

Year	Entrant	Chassis	Engine	1	2	3	4	5	6	7	8
1967	Team Lotus	Lotus 48 F2	Cosworth L4	ROC	SPR	INT	SYR	OUL	ESP; DNS		
1971	STP March Racing Team	March 711	Cosworth V8	ARG	ROC	QUE	SPR	INT	RIN; 8	OUL	VIC
1972	España Marlboro BRM	BRM P153	BRM V12	ROC	BRA; Ret	INT	OUL	REP	VIC		

=== Complete 24 Hours of Le Mans results ===
Year	Team	Co-drivers	Car	Class	Laps	Pos.	Class pos.
1968	(Germany) Porsche System	(Austria) Rudi Lins	Porsche 907 LH	P 3.0	145	DNF	DNF
1972	(Germany) Ford Deutschland	(Germany) Dieter Glemser	Ford Capri 2600RS	TS 3.0	289	11th	2nd
