= BRM P139 =

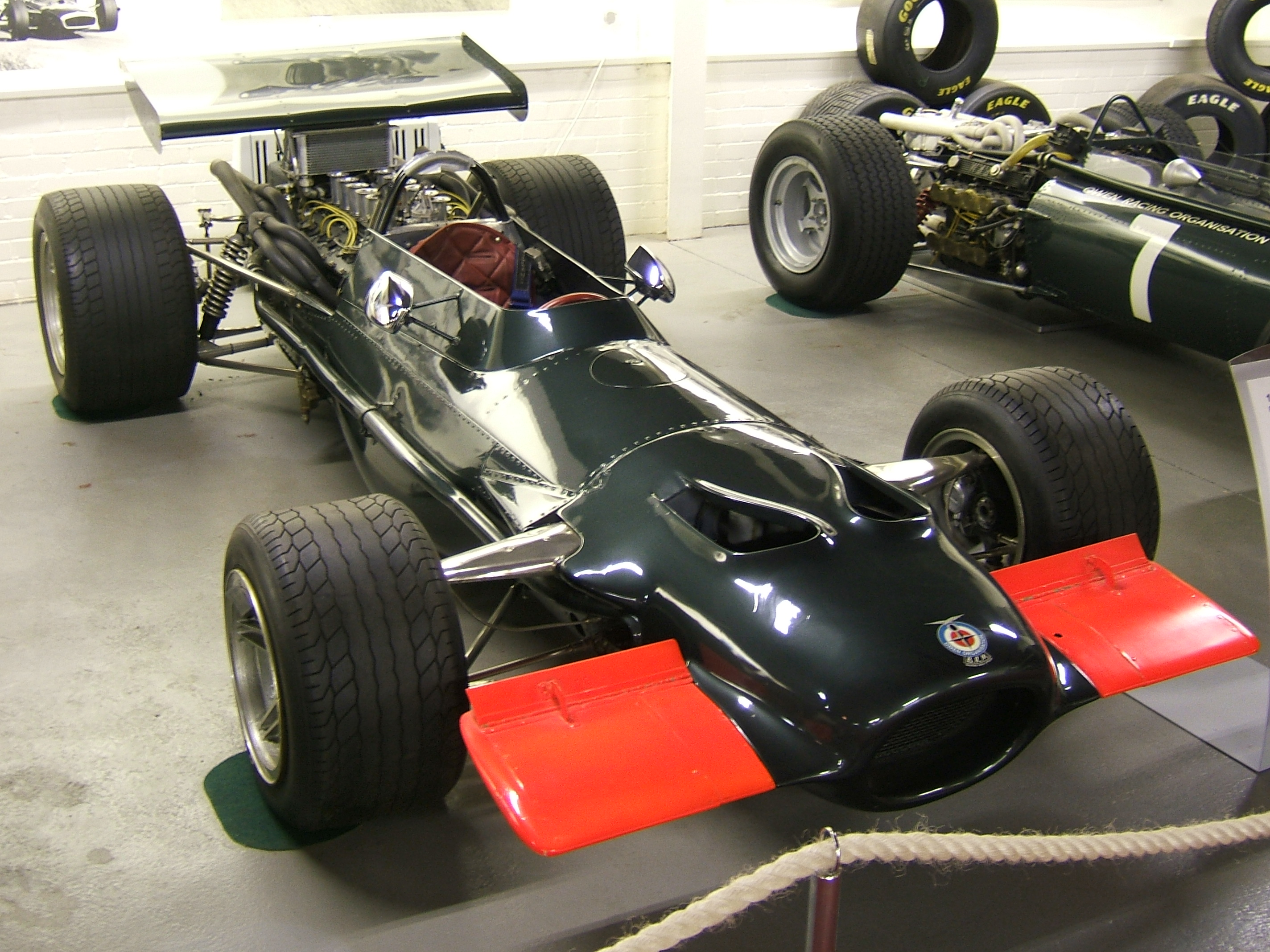
- Category: Formula One
- Constructor: British Racing Motors
- Designer: Alec Osborn
- Predecessor: P138
- Successor: P153

Technical specifications
- Chassis: Aluminium alloy monocoque
- Suspension (front): Lower wishbones, top rockers actuating vertically mounted inboard coil springs over dampers, anti-roll bar
- Suspension (rear): Reversed lower wishbones, top links, twin radius rods, coil springs over dampers, anti-roll bar
- Axle track: Front: 1,549 mm (61.0 in); Rear: 1,498 mm (59.0 in)
- Wheelbase: 2,426 mm (95.5 in)
- Engine: BRM P142 2,998 cc (182.9 cu in) V12 Naturally aspirated, mid-mounted
- Transmission: BRM 5-speed manual
- Weight: 550kg
- Fuel: Shell
- Tyres: Dunlop

Competition history
- Notable entrants: Owen Racing Organisation
- Notable drivers: (United Kingdom) John Surtees (United Kingdom) Jackie Oliver
- Debut: 1969 British Grand Prix
Races	Wins	Poles	F/Laps
8	0	0	0
- Unless otherwise stated, all data refer to Formula One World Championship Grands Prix only.

The BRM P139 was a Formula One racing car designed by Alec Osborn, based on the original P126/133/138 design by Len Terry, which raced during the 1969 and 1970 seasons. It was powered by a 3.0-litre V12 engine. The car was uncompetitive, which resulted in team boss Tony Rudd being asked to resign, with his position being taken over by Tony Southgate, Tim Parnell and Aubrey Woods. After the team did not attend the French Grand Prix, a redesigned P139 appeared at the British Grand Prix, with a roomier, more bulbous cockpit and additional strengthening, giving the P139 a cylindrical appearance. The revised car was barely an improvement on the original P139, and was replaced by the P153 for the 1970 season. The P139 made one final appearance, at the 1970 South African Grand Prix, driven by George Eaton, who was effectively paying for his drive, and thus did not receive a 'works' P153.

== Formula One World Championship results ==
(key)

Year	Entrant	Engine	Tyres	Drivers	1	2	3	4	5	6	7	8	9	10	11	12	13	Points	WCC
1969	Owen Racing Organisation	BRM P142; 3.0 V12	D		RSA	ESP	MON	NED	FRA	GBR	GER	ITA	CAN	USA	MEX			7 ^{1}	5th ^{1}
1969	Owen Racing Organisation	BRM P142; 3.0 V12	D	John Surtees						Ret	Ret	NC	Ret	3	Ret			7 ^{1}	5th ^{1}
1969	Owen Racing Organisation	BRM P142; 3.0 V12	D	Jackie Oliver								Ret	Ret	Ret	6			7 ^{1}	5th ^{1}
1970	Owen Racing Organisation	BRM P142 3.0 V12	D		RSA	ESP	MON	BEL	NED	FRA	GBR	GER	AUT	ITA	CAN	USA	MEX	23 ^{2}	7th ^{2}
1970	Owen Racing Organisation	BRM P142 3.0 V12	D	George Eaton	Ret													23 ^{2}	7th ^{2}
1970	Owen Racing Organisation	BRM P142 3.0 V12	D	Werner Bickell		DNA												23 ^{2}	7th ^{2}

^1 Two points scored by the BRM P138.
^2 All points scored by the BRM P153.
