= Pete Lovely =

American racing driver (1926–2011)

- Born: April 11, 1926; Livingston, Montana, U.S.
- Died: May 15, 2011 (aged 85); Tacoma, Washington, U.S.

Formula One World Championship career
- Nationality: (United States) American
- Active years: 1959–1960, 1969–1971
- Team(s): Lotus (mostly as privateer), non-works Cooper
- Entries: 11 (7 starts)
- Championships: 0
- Wins: 0
- Podiums: 0
- Career points: 0
- Pole positions: 0
- Fastest laps: 0
- First entry: 1959 Monaco Grand Prix
- Last entry: 1971 United States Grand Prix

Gerard Carlton "Pete" Lovely (April 11, 1926 – May 15, 2011) was a racecar driver and businessman from the United States. He was born in Livingston, Montana.

== Racing career ==
On November 9, 1957, Lovely won the first ever race held at Laguna Seca, driving a Ferrari. Lovely participated in 11 Formula One World Championship Grands Prix, debuting on May 10, 1959. He scored no championship points. He won the S3.0 class and achieved a podium overall at the 1960 12 Hours of Sebring with a Ferrari 250 Testa Rossa. He was best known in his Formula One career for racing various private Lotus cars in World Championship events (usually entered under the banner of 'Pete Lovely Volkswagen') including a hybrid made from a Lotus 69 Formula Two car fitted with a Formula One-specification, 3.0L Cosworth DFV V8 engine. After his retirement from Formula One he was an entrant in various kinds of racing in the USA until the 1980s. Lovely's racing career spanned more than 50 years, and he continued to participate in Vintage and Historic events into the 2000s.

== Business career ==
Lovely opened "Pete Lovely Volkswagen", a Volkswagen dealership in Fife, Washington, in 1954 and ran it for 34 years. He also owned "Pete Lovely Racing" which restored vintage race cars.

Pete's only son, Chris, began working on Pete's cars at a young age and went on to become a highly respected mechanic in Can-Am, CART, Champ Car and IndyCar, working for championship-winning teams.

== Death ==
Lovely died on May 15, 2011 at his home in Tacoma, aged 85 from Alzheimer's disease.

== Racing record ==
=== Complete Formula One World Championship results ===
(key)

Year	Team	Chassis	Engine	1	2	3	4	5	6	7	8	9	10	11	12	13	WDC	Pts
1959	Team Lotus	Lotus 16	Climax FPF 2.5 L4	MON; DNQ	500	NED	FRA	GBR	GER	POR	ITA	USA					NC	0
1960	Fred Armbruster	Cooper T51	Ferrari 107 2.5 L4	ARG	MON	500	NED	BEL	FRA	GBR	POR	ITA	USA; 11				NC	0
1969	Pete Lovely Volkswagen Inc.	Lotus 49B	Ford Cosworth DFV 3.0 V8	RSA	ESP	MON	NED	FRA	GBR	GER	ITA	CAN; 7	USA; Ret	MEX; 9			NC	0
1970	Pete Lovely Volkswagen Inc.	Lotus 49B	Ford Cosworth DFV 3.0 V8	RSA	ESP	MON	BEL	NED; DNQ	FRA; DNQ	GBR; NC	GER	AUT	ITA	CAN	USA; DNQ	MEX	NC	0
1971	Pete Lovely Volkswagen Inc.	Lotus 69 Special	Ford Cosworth DFV 3.0 V8	RSA	ESP	MON	NED	FRA	GBR	GER	AUT	ITA	CAN; NC	USA; NC			NC	0

=== Complete Formula One Non-Championship results ===
(key)

Year	Team	Chassis	Engine	1	2	3	4	5	6	7	8
1959	Team Lotus	Lotus 16	Climax FPF 2.5 L4	GLV	AIN	INT; 15	OUL	SIL			
1969	Pete Lovely Volkswagen Inc.	Lotus 49B	Ford Cosworth DFV 3.0 V8	ROC; 6	INT; Ret	MAD	OUL				
1970	Pete Lovely Volkswagen Inc.	Lotus 49B	Ford Cosworth DFV 3.0 V8	ROC; Ret	INT; 13	OUL					
1971	Pete Lovely Volkswagen Inc.	Lotus 49B	Ford Cosworth DFV 3.0 V8	ARG	ROC	QUE; DNQ	SPR	INT	RIN	OUL	VIC

=== Complete World Sportscar Championship results ===
==== 12 Hours of Sebring ====
Year	Entrant	No	Car	Drivers	Class	Laps	Pos.	Class Pos.
1960	(United States) Jack Nethercutt	8	Ferrari 250 Testa Rossa 59 Ferrari V12 2996	(United States) Jack Nethercutt (United States) Pete Lovely	S3.0	186	3rd	1st
1961	(United States) Jack Nethercutt	9	Ferrari 250 Testa Rossa 59 Ferrari V12 2996	(United States) Jack Nethercutt (United States) Pete Lovely	S3.0	1	DNF Oil Pump	

== Sources ==
- Profile at www.grandprix.com
