= BRM P153 =

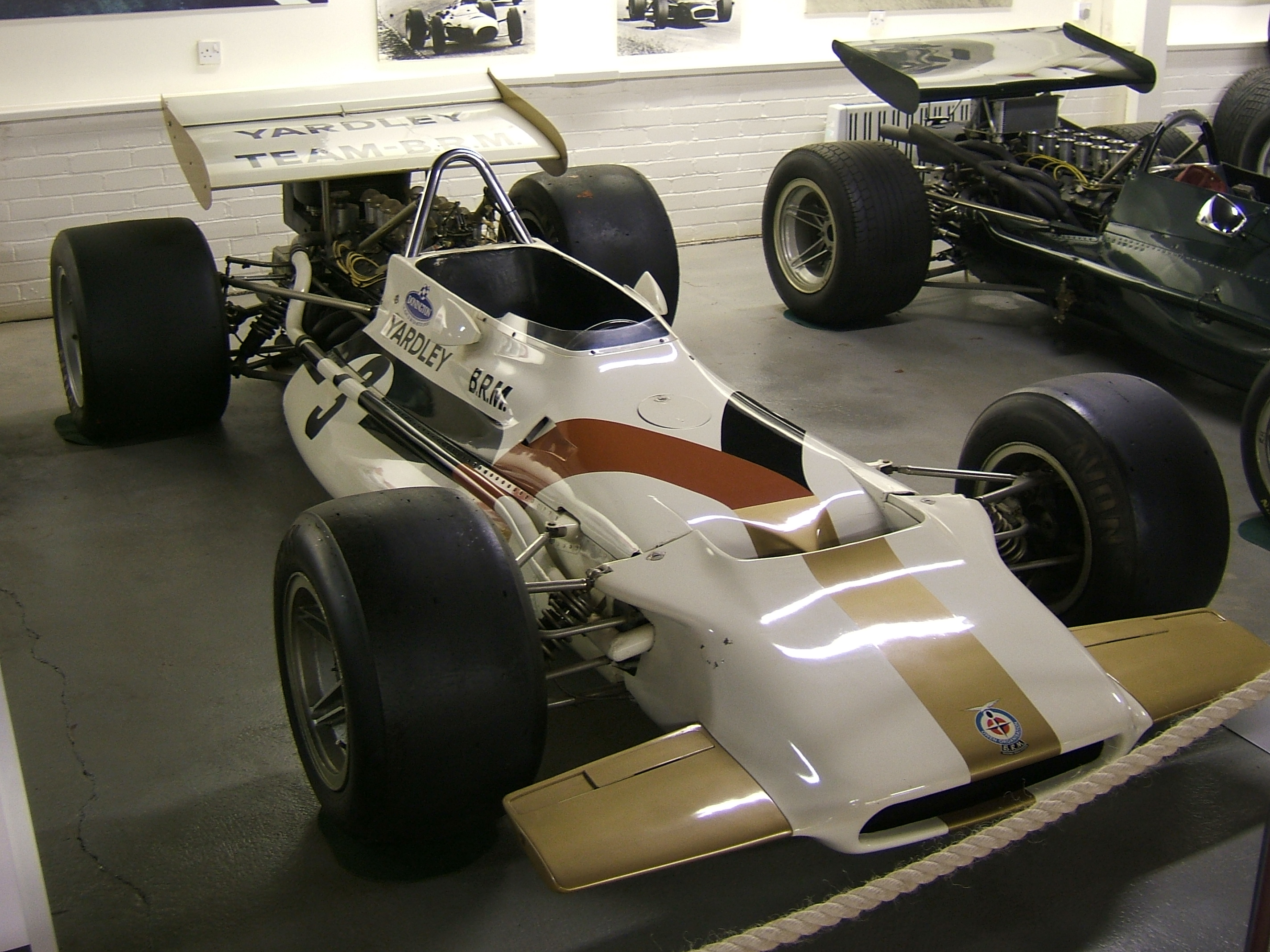
- Category: Formula One
- Designer: Tony Southgate
- Predecessor: BRM P139
- Successor: BRM P160

Technical specifications
- Length: 3,579 mm (140.9 in)
- Wheelbase: 2,440 mm (96.1 in)
- Engine: BRM P142 3.0 V12 Naturally-aspirated, 11,500 RPM
- Transmission: BRM P151 5-speed manual
- Fuel: 227 Litres

Competition history
Entries	Wins	Podiums	Poles
78	1	4	0
- Constructors' Championships: 0
- Drivers' Championships: 0

The BRM P153 was a Formula One racing car designed by Tony Southgate for the British Racing Motors team, which raced in the 1970, 1971 and 1972 Formula One seasons. It was powered by a 3.0-litre V12 engine. Its best result was victory at the 1970 Belgian Grand Prix, where Pedro Rodríguez beat the second-placed March of Chris Amon by just 1.1 seconds. The model was first shown in BRM's traditional British racing green, but by the time it appeared on the race tracks it was in the colours of the team's sponsor, Yardley of London.

== Engine ==
In contrast to the other British teams, amongst whom the Cosworth DFV V8 had become nearly ubiquitous, BRM chose a different route for the P153's engine. In accordance with their long-standing practice of building both chassis and engine, they installed their existing 3.0-litre, 48-valve V12 engine, that produced approximately 425 bhp (317 kW), with a redline of 11,500 RPM. Magneti Marelli supplied their Dinoplex ignition system, and Lucas provided mechanical fuel injection.

== Gearbox ==
Its gearbox was a sequential BRM P151 type with 5-speeds with reverse, which was connected to the engine by a Borg & Beck clutch.

== Chassis ==
It had an aluminium monocoque with tubular support attached to the engine. Its total weight was 535kg.

== Post-competition ==
In 2024, the Mexican driver Adrián Fernández acquired BRM P153/05 from a private collector. The amount of the sale was not disclosed.

== Complete Formula One World Championship results ==
(key) (results in bold indicate pole position; results in italics indicate fastest lap)

Year	Entrant	Chassis	Engine	Tyres	Drivers	1	2	3	4	5	6	7	8	9	10	11	12	13	Points	WCC
1970	Owen Racing Organisation	P153	BRM P142 V12	D		RSA	ESP	MON	BEL	NED	FRA	GBR	GER	AUT	ITA	CAN	USA	MEX	**23**	**6th**
1970	Owen Racing Organisation	P153	BRM P142 V12	D	Jackie Oliver	Ret													**23**	**6th**
1970	Owen Racing Organisation	P153	BRM P142 V12	D	Pedro Rodríguez	9													**23**	**6th**
1970	Owen Racing Organisation	P153	BRM P142 V12	D	George Eaton		DNQ	DNQ											**23**	**6th**
1970	Yardley Team BRM	P153	BRM P142 V12	D	Jackie Oliver		Ret	Ret	Ret	Ret	Ret	Ret	Ret	5	Ret	NC	Ret	7	**23**	**6th**
1970	Yardley Team BRM	P153	BRM P142 V12	D	Pedro Rodríguez		Ret	6	1	10	Ret	Ret	Ret	4	Ret	4	2	6	**23**	**6th**
1970	Yardley Team BRM	P153	BRM P142 V12	D	George Eaton					Ret	12	Ret		11	Ret	10	Ret		**23**	**6th**
1970	Yardley Team BRM	P153	BRM P142 V12	D	Peter Westbury												DNQ		**23**	**6th**
1971	Yardley Team BRM	P153	BRM P142 V12	F		RSA	ESP	MON	NED	FRA	GBR	GER	AUT	ITA	CAN	USA			**36**^{1}	**2nd**^{1}
1971	Yardley Team BRM	P153	BRM P142 V12	F	Jo Siffert	Ret													**36**^{1}	**2nd**^{1}
1971	Yardley Team BRM	P153	BRM P142 V12	F	Howden Ganley	Ret	10	DNQ	7	10	8	Ret							**36**^{1}	**2nd**^{1}
1971	Yardley Team BRM	P153	BRM P142 V12	F	Helmut Marko								11	Ret	12				**36**^{1}	**2nd**^{1}
1971	Yardley Team BRM	P153	BRM P142 V12	F	John Cannon											14			**36**^{1}	**2nd**^{1}
1972	Marlboro BRM	P153	BRM P142 V12	F		ARG	RSA	ESP	MON	BEL	FRA	GBR	GER	AUT	ITA	CAN	USA		**14**^{2}	**7th**^{2}
1972	Marlboro BRM	P153	BRM P142 V12	F	Reine Wisell	Ret													**14**^{2}	**7th**^{2}
1972	Marlboro BRM	P153	BRM P142 V12	F	Helmut Marko	10	14												**14**^{2}	**7th**^{2}
1972	Marlboro BRM	P153B	BRM P142 V12	F	Helmut Marko				8	10									**14**^{2}	**7th**^{2}
1972	Marlboro BRM	P153B	BRM P142 V12	F	Vern Schuppan					DNS									**14**^{2}	**7th**^{2}

^1 All points scored by the BRM P160.
^2 All points scored by the BRM P160s.
