= George Eaton (racing driver) =

Canadian racing driver (born 1945)

- Born: 12 November 1945 (age 81); Toronto, Ontario, Canada

Formula One World Championship career
- Nationality: (Canada) Canadian
- Active years: 1969 – 1971
- Team: BRM
- Entries: 13 (11 starts)
- Championships: 0
- Wins: 0
- Podiums: 0
- Career points: 0
- Pole positions: 0
- Fastest laps: 0
- First entry: 1969 United States Grand Prix
- Last entry: 1971 Canadian Grand Prix

George Ross Eaton (born 12 November 1945) is a Canadian former racing driver who is a member of the formerly prominent Eaton family.

== Life and career ==
Eaton was born in Toronto, the youngest son of John and Signy Eaton. He gained attention as a Canadian race driver who participated in Can Am, Formula One and Formula A races.

Eaton served as president of the family company for its final decade. Under his leadership, Eaton's continued its precipitous decline from its historic dominance in the Canadian retail market to ultimate liquidation.

Eaton's Formula One career with British Racing Motors included 13 World Championship Grands Prix and one non-Championship race, debuting on 5 October 1969. He scored no championship points.

Eaton raced in the Can-Am series in 1968, 1969 and 1970. He was the top Canadian in the Can-Am Series in 1969. He participated in the Canadian Formula A series in 1969 and the Continental Series in 1969 and 1971 but retired from racing after 1972. He was inducted into the Canadian Motorsport Hall of Fame in 1994, and received an honorary doctor of laws degree from St Francis Xavier University at a special convocation in April 1996.

Eaton attempted one NASCAR Grand National Series event in 1970 at Charlotte Motor Speedway but failed to qualify.

== Complete Formula One World Championship results ==
(key)

Year	Entrant	Chassis	Engine	1	2	3	4	5	6	7	8	9	10	11	12	13	WDC	Points
1969	Owen Racing Organisation	BRM P138	BRM P142 3.0 V12	RSA	ESP	MON	NED	FRA	GBR	GER	ITA	CAN	USA; Ret	MEX; Ret			NC	0
1970	Owen Racing Organisation	BRM P139	BRM P142 3.0 V12	RSA; Ret													NC	0
1970	Owen Racing Organisation	BRM P153	BRM P142 3.0 V12		ESP; DNQ	MON; DNQ	BEL										NC	0
1970	Yardley Team BRM	BRM P153	BRM P142 3.0 V12					NED; Ret	FRA; 12	GBR; Ret	GER	AUT; 11	ITA; Ret	CAN; 10	USA; Ret	MEX	NC	0
1971	Yardley Team BRM	BRM P160	BRM P142 3.0 V12	RSA	ESP	MON	NED	FRA	GBR	GER	AUT	ITA	CAN; 15	USA			NC	0

== See also ==
- List of Canadians in Champ Car
