= BRM P138 =

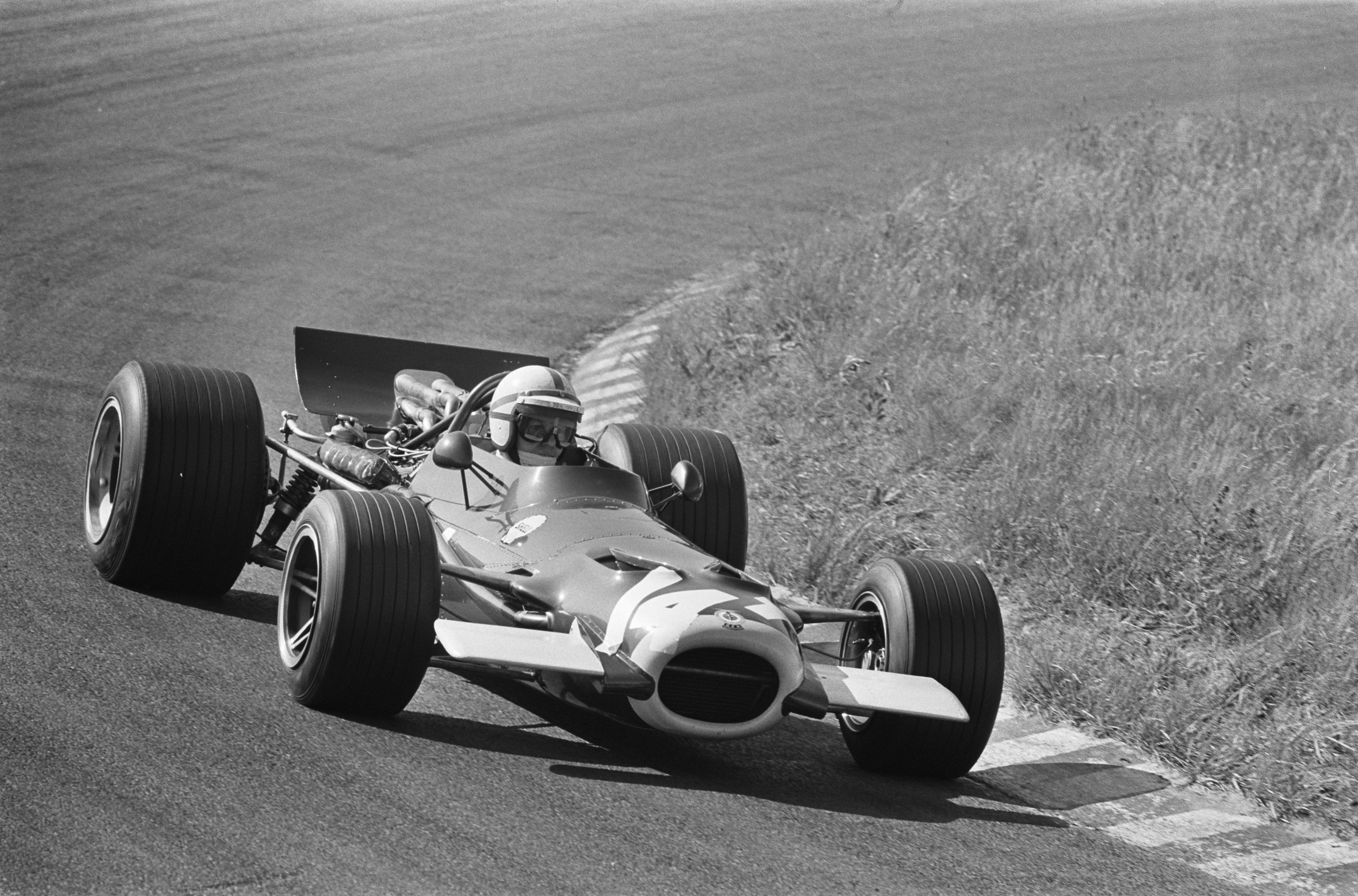
- Category: Formula One
- Constructor: British Racing Motors
- Designer: Len Terry
- Predecessor: P133
- Successor: P139

Technical specifications
- Chassis: Aluminium alloy monocoque
- Axle track: Front: 1,575 mm (62.0 in); Rear: 1,575 mm (62.0 in)
- Wheelbase: 2,375 mm (93.5 in)
- Engine: BRM 2,998 cc (182.9 cu in) V12 naturally aspirated, mid-mounted
- Transmission: BRM 5-speed manual
- Weight: 540kg
- Fuel: Shell
- Tyres: 1968: Goodyear; 1969: Dunlop

Competition history
- Notable entrants: Owen Racing Organisation
- Notable drivers: (Mexico) Pedro Rodríguez (United Kingdom) John Surtees
- Debut: 1968 Spanish Grand Prix
| Races | Wins | Poles | F/Laps |
|---|---|---|---|
| 10 | 0 | 0 | 0 |
- Constructors' Championships: 0
- Drivers' Championships: 0
- Unless otherwise stated, all data refer to Formula One World Championship Grands Prix only.

The BRM P138 was a Formula One racing car designed by Len Terry which raced in the 1968 and 1969 Formula One seasons. It was powered by a 3.0-litre V12 engine.

== Racing History ==
=== 1968 ===
The P138 raced twice in 1968 but retired from both races due to engine failure, with Mexican Pedro Rodríguez at round nine in Italy and American Bobby Unser at round eleven in the United States.

BRM finished the season in fifth place in the Constructors' Championship with twenty eight points, although all had been scored by the BRM P126 and BRM P133.

=== 1969 ===
The first race of the 1969 season was the South African Grand Prix with John Surtees and Jackie Oliver driving, Surtees drove the P138 and Oliver in the BRM P133, Surtees retired from the race with engine failure. Surtees finished fifth in Spain. The Monaco Grand Prix saw Surtees retire with a broken gearbox due to him missing a gear and the Brabham of Jack Brabham crashing into the back of Surtees. The Englishman finished ninth in Holland. BRM skipped the French Grand Prix because of the team rebuilding, with Tony Rudd departing and the horrible start of the BRM P139. The P138 was not used in Britain because Surtees drove the P139 but the P138 reappeared at the German Grand Prix with Jackie Oliver driving but retired with an oil leak. The P138 was not used in Italy because Oliver had a second P139 to drive but the P138 reappeared at the Canadian Grand Prix with Canadian Bill Brack driving but was ten laps down and not classified. Brack was replaced by Canadian George Eaton but retired from the final two races of 1969, engine failure in the United States and a broken gearbox in Mexico.

BRM finished the season in fifth place in the Constructors' Championship with seven points for the second season running, although all but two had been scored by the BRM P133 and BRM P139.

== Formula One World Championship results ==
(key)

| Year | Entrant | Engine | Tyres | Drivers | 1 | 2 | 3 | 4 | 5 | 6 | 7 | 8 | 9 | 10 | 11 | 12 | Points | WCC |
|---|---|---|---|---|---|---|---|---|---|---|---|---|---|---|---|---|---|---|
| 1968 | Owen Racing Organisation | BRM P101 3.0 V12 | G | | RSA | ESP | MON | BEL | NED | FRA | GBR | GER | ITA | CAN | USA | MEX | 28 ^{1} | 5th ^{1} |
| 1968 | Owen Racing Organisation | BRM P101 3.0 V12 | G | Pedro Rodríguez | | | | | | | | | Ret | | | | 28 ^{1} | 5th ^{1} |
| 1968 | Owen Racing Organisation | BRM P101 3.0 V12 | G | Bobby Unser | | | | | | | | | | | Ret | | 28 ^{1} | 5th ^{1} |
| 1969 | Owen Racing Organisation | BRM P101 3.0 V12; BRM P142 3.0 V12 | D | | RSA | ESP | MON | NED | FRA | GBR | GER | ITA | CAN | USA | MEX | | 7 ^{2} | 5th ^{2} |
| 1969 | Owen Racing Organisation | BRM P101 3.0 V12; BRM P142 3.0 V12 | D | John Surtees | Ret | 5 | Ret | 9 | | | | | | | | | 7 ^{2} | 5th ^{2} |
| 1969 | Owen Racing Organisation | BRM P101 3.0 V12; BRM P142 3.0 V12 | D | Jackie Oliver | | | | | | | Ret | | | | | | 7 ^{2} | 5th ^{2} |
| 1969 | Owen Racing Organisation | BRM P101 3.0 V12; BRM P142 3.0 V12 | D | Bill Brack | | | | | | | | | NC | | | | 7 ^{2} | 5th ^{2} |
| 1969 | Owen Racing Organisation | BRM P101 3.0 V12; BRM P142 3.0 V12 | D | George Eaton | | | | | | | | | | Ret | Ret | | 7 ^{2} | 5th ^{2} |

^1 Points also scored by the BRM P126 and BRM P133.
^2 Points also scored by the BRM P133 and BRM P139.
