= Johnny Servoz-Gavin =

French racing driver (1942–2006)

- Born: 18 January 1942; Grenoble, Rhône-Alpes, France
- Died: 29 May 2006 (aged 64); Grenoble, Rhône-Alpes, France

Formula One World Championship career
- Nationality: (France) French
- Active years: 1967–1970
- Team(s): Matra, Cooper, Tyrrell
- Entries: 13 (12 starts)
- Championships: 0
- Wins: 0
- Podiums: 1
- Career points: 9
- Pole positions: 0
- Fastest laps: 0
- First entry: 1967 Monaco Grand Prix
- Last entry: 1970 Monaco Grand Prix

Georges-Francis "Johnny" Servoz-Gavin (18 January 1942 – 29 May 2006) was a French motor racing driver in both sportscars and single seaters.

Servoz-Gavin participated in 13 Formula One World Championship Grands Prix between 1967 and 1970, qualifying in all but one. He achieved one podium, and scored a total of nine championship points. He drove for the Tyrrell Formula One team, mainly as Jackie Stewart's teammate.

== Early life ==
Servoz-Gavin was born in Grenoble, a city in the foothills of the Alps. As a teenager, he worked as a ski instructor, during which time he became known as "Johnny".

== Career ==
=== Lower formulae ===
Servoz-Gavin's early work included developing sports cars for Matra. After initially competing in rallying, Servoz-Gavin moved to single-seater racing. He had previously attended the racing drivers' school at the Magny-Cours circuit in the centre of France, (from which he was "thrown out") and in 1965 entered the French Formula Three Championship in a private Brabham BT18. By the late 1960s, Servoz-Gavin was a rising star, following in the footsteps of Jacky Ickx and Jean-Pierre Beltoise. He became French Formula Three Champion in 1966 driving a works Matra MS5, and in 1969 he won the European Formula Two Championship.

=== Formula One ===
His Formula Three racing performances won Servoz-Gavin the attention of Matra, resulting in his moving into Formula One. His best season was 1968, particularly the 1968 Italian Grand Prix in which he finished second and scored six points, driving a Matra. He also impressed at the Monaco Grand Prix, entering as Jackie Stewart's stand-in, starting from the front row of the grid, and leading from Graham Hill at the start, until his race ended early after clipping a barrier and breaking a driveshaft in a similar incident to the one that resulted in the death of Lorenzo Bandini in the Monaco Grand Prix the previous year. Next year, he also scored a sixth place in the 1969 Canadian Grand Prix at Mosport Park, which secured him a place in history as the only driver ever to score a world championship point with a four-wheel-driven Formula One car, the Matra MS84.

Servoz-Gavin suffered an eye injury in an off-road event in the winter of 1969–70, and had been worrying that his eyesight had been damaged. Driving a March 701, for the Tyrrell team he finished fifth (yet last) in the 1970 Spanish Grand Prix at Jarama. Then after hitting a barrier again, and failing to qualify for the 1970 Monaco Grand Prix he decided to retire. Servoz-Gavin felt that the risks inherent in Formula One and racing in general were not worthwhile but the problems with his vision may have influenced his decision.

=== Other motorsport interests ===
In 1969, Servoz-Gavin participated in Matra endurance events, co-driving with Pedro Rodríguez.

== Later life ==
A man of good looks and high society, Servoz-Gavin was among a number of Formula One drivers rumoured to be the unknown driver in Claude Lelouch's 1977 short footage film C'était un rendez-vous, although Lelouch claimed to have driven the car himself.

After his racing career was over, Servoz-Gavin lived on a houseboat and suffered serious burns when a gas bottle exploded on his boat in 1982. He died in May 2006 as the result of a pulmonary embolism, following a period of ill health. He was 64 years old.

== Racing record ==
=== 24 Hours of Le Mans results ===
| Year | Team | Co-Drivers | Car | Class | Laps | Pos. | Class Pos. |
|---|---|---|---|---|---|---|---|
| 1966 | (France) Matra Sports SARL | (France) Jean-Pierre Beltoise | Matra MS620-BRM | P 2.0 | 112 | DNF | DNF |
| 1967 | (France) Equipe Matra Sports | (France) Jean-Pierre Beltoise | Matra MS630-BRM | P 2.0 | 155 | DNF | DNF |
| 1968 | (France) Equipe Matra Sports | (France) Henri Pescarolo | Matra MS630 | P 3.0 | 283 | DNF | DNF |
| 1969 | (France) Equipe Matra Elf | (Switzerland) Herbert Müller | Matra MS630 | P 3.0 | 158 | DNF | DNF |

=== Complete European Formula Two Championship results ===
(key) (Races in bold indicate pole position; races in italics indicate fastest lap)

| Year | Entrant | Chassis | Engine | 1 | 2 | 3 | 4 | 5 | 6 | 7 | 8 | 9 | 10 | Pos. | Pts |
|---|---|---|---|---|---|---|---|---|---|---|---|---|---|---|---|
| 1967 | Matra Sports | Matra MS5 | Ford | SNE | SIL | NÜR; Ret | HOC | TUL; 8 | JAR; 5 | ZAN; Ret | PER; 5 | BRH | | 6th | 15 |
| 1967 | Matra Sports | Matra MS7 | Ford | | | | | | | | | | VAL; 3 | 6th | 15 |
| 1968 | Matra Sports | Matra MS7 | Ford | HOC | THR | JAR | PAL; Ret | TUL | ZAN | PER | HOC | VAL | | NC | 0 |
| 1969 | Matra International | Matra MS7 | Ford | THR; 5 | HOC; 6 | NÜR; 6 | JAR; 4 | TUL | PER; 2 | **VAL**; 1 | | | | 1st | 37 |

=== Complete Formula One World Championship results ===
(key)

| Year | Entrant | Chassis | Engine | 1 | 2 | 3 | 4 | 5 | 6 | 7 | 8 | 9 | 10 | 11 | 12 | 13 | WDC | Pts |
|---|---|---|---|---|---|---|---|---|---|---|---|---|---|---|---|---|---|---|
| 1967 | Matra Sports | Matra MS5 (F2) | Ford Cosworth FVA 1.6 L4 | RSA | MON; Ret | NED | BEL | FRA | GBR | GER | CAN | ITA | USA | MEX | | | NC | 0 |
| 1968 | Matra International | Matra MS10 | Ford Cosworth DFV 3.0 V8 | RSA | ESP | MON; Ret | BEL | NED | | | | ITA; 2 | CAN; Ret | USA | MEX; Ret | | 13th | 6 |
| 1968 | Cooper Car Company | Cooper T86B | BRM P101 3.0 V12 | | | | | | FRA; Ret | GBR | GER | | | | | | 13th | 6 |
| 1969 | Matra International | Matra MS7 (F2) | Ford Cosworth FVA 1.6 L4 | RSA | ESP | MON | NED | FRA | GBR | GER; Ret | ITA | | | | | | 17th | 1 |
| 1969 | Matra International | Matra MS84 | Ford Cosworth DFV 3.0 V8 | | | | | | | | | CAN; 6 | USA; NC | MEX; 8 | | | 17th | 1 |
| 1970 | Tyrrell Racing Organisation | March 701 | Ford Cosworth DFV 3.0 V8 | RSA; Ret | ESP; 5 | MON; DNQ | BEL | NED | FRA | GBR | GER | AUT | ITA | CAN | USA | MEX | 20th | 2 |

Sporting positions
| Preceded by Jean-Pierre Beltoise | French Formula Three; Champion; 1966 | Succeeded by Henri Pescarolo |
| Preceded by Jean-Pierre Beltoise | European Formula Two; Champion; 1969 | Succeeded by Clay Regazzoni |
