= 1969 Mexican Grand Prix =

- The Ciudad Deportiva Magdalena Mixhuca

Race details
- Date: October 19, 1969
- Official name: Mexican Grand Prix
- Location: Ciudad Deportiva Magdalena Mixhuca, Mexico City, Mexico
- Course: Permanent racing facility
- Course length: 5.000 km (3.107 miles)
- Distance: 65 laps, 325.000 km (201.946 miles)
- Weather: Warm and dry

Pole position
Driver	(Australia) Jack Brabham	Brabham-Ford
- Time: 1:42.90

Fastest lap
Driver	(Belgium) Jacky Ickx	Brabham-Ford
- Time: 1:43.05 on lap 64

Podium
First	(New Zealand) Denny Hulme	McLaren-Ford
Second	(Belgium) Jacky Ickx	Brabham-Ford
Third	(Australia) Jack Brabham	Brabham-Ford

The 1969 Gran Premio de Mexico (Mexican Grand Prix) was a Formula One motor race held at the Ciudad Deportiva Magdalena Mixhuca, Mexico City on October 19, 1969, two weeks after the United States Grand Prix at Watkins Glen. It was race 11 of 11 in both the 1969 World Championship of Drivers and the 1969 International Cup for Formula One Manufacturers. The 65-lap race was won by McLaren driver Denny Hulme after he started from fourth position. Jacky Ickx finished second for the Brabham team and his teammate Jack Brabham came in third.

== Report ==
=== Entry ===
A total of 17 F1 cars were entered for this event, the last of the season. Team Lotus had had mixed fortunes at Watkins Glen, although Jochen Rindt had won the race, his teammate Graham Hill had broken both legs in an accident. At this event, Lotus decided not to replace him. However they did run a second car, a Lotus 63 developmental car with four wheel drive for John Miles, as Mario Andretti was busy winning the Dan Gurney 200 at Pacific Raceways, USA.

The rest of the field was unchanged, with only one Ferrari 312 entered by NART for local hero, Pedro Rodríguez.

=== Qualifying ===
The Motor Racing Developments Ltd team proved to be very fast in Mexico, as they dominated qualifying in their Brabham-Cosworth BT26A. Jack Brabham secured pole position, for the team, averaging a speed of 96.087 mph. Next fastest was his teammate, Jacky Ickx. The 1969 World Champion, Jackie Stewart was third fastest in his Matra-Cosworth MS80, who shared the second row with the McLaren-Cosworth M7A of Denny Hulme. A pair of Lotus 49s were on row three, with Jo Siffert ahead of Jochen Rindt.

=== Race ===
The race was held over 65 laps, however, for the second consecutive race, Bruce McLaren failed to make the start. Of the 16 remaining cars, Jackie Stewart made the best start, with the Brabhams of Jacky Ickx and Jack Brabham in pursuit, Jochen Rindt fourth, and Denny Hulme close behind. By the end of the second lap, led, while Ickx was putting pressure on Stewart. By lap six, Ickx was through, into the lead, and Hulme past Brabham to take third. Hulme overtook Stewart on the next lap, and set about chasing down Ickx. On lap 10, Hulme's McLaren was ahead. Meanwhile, Stewart’s Matra had dropped behind Brabham, and this is how the top four remained throughout the remainder of the race. Rindt ran fifth early on in the race, but bent his suspension on a curb, leading to his retirement, so fifth went to Jean-Pierre Beltoise, with Jackie Oliver finishing sixth in the BRM P139, two laps adrift.

Hulme won in a time of 1hr 54min 5.3sec, an average speed of 99.618 mph (160.320 km/h). Hulme finished just 2.56 seconds ahead of Ickx.

== Qualifying ==
=== Qualifying ===
Pos	No	Driver	Constructor	Time	Gap
1	8	(Australia) Jack Brabham	Brabham-Ford	1:42.90	—
2	7	(Belgium) Jacky Ickx	Brabham-Ford	1:43.60	+0.70
3	3	(United Kingdom) Jackie Stewart	Matra-Ford	1:43.67	+0.77
4	5	(New Zealand) Denny Hulme	McLaren-Ford	1:43.70	+0.80
5	10	(Switzerland) Jo Siffert	Lotus-Ford	1:43.81	+0.91
6	2	(Austria) Jochen Rindt	Lotus-Ford	1:43.94	+1.04
7	6	(New Zealand) Bruce McLaren	McLaren-Ford	1:44.75	+1.85
8	4	(France) Jean-Pierre Beltoise	Matra-Ford	1:45.58	+2.68
9	18	(United Kingdom) Piers Courage	Brabham-Ford	1:47.23	+4.33
10	14	(United Kingdom) John Surtees	BRM	1:47.29	+4.39
11	9	(United Kingdom) John Miles	Lotus-Ford	1:47.76	+4.86
12	15	(United Kingdom) Jackie Oliver	BRM	1:48.01	+5.11
13	19	(Switzerland) Silvio Moser	Brabham-Ford	1:48.25	+5.35
14	16	(France) Johnny Servoz-Gavin	Matra-Ford	1:48.74	+5.84
15	12	(Mexico) Pedro Rodríguez	Ferrari	1:49.46	+6.56
16	21	(United States) Pete Lovely	Lotus-Ford	1:50.34	+7.44
17	22	(Canada) George Eaton	BRM	1:52.30	+9.40

== Race ==
=== Classification ===
Pos	No	Driver	Constructor	Laps	Time/Retired	Grid	Points
1	5	(New Zealand) Denny Hulme	McLaren-Ford	65	1:54:08.80	4	9
2	7	(Belgium) Jacky Ickx	Brabham-Ford	65	+ 2.56	2	6
3	8	(Australia) Jack Brabham	Brabham-Ford	65	+ 38.48	1	4
4	3	(United Kingdom) Jackie Stewart	Matra-Ford	65	+ 47.04	3	3
5	4	(France) Jean-Pierre Beltoise	Matra-Ford	65	+ 1:38.52	8	2
6	15	(United Kingdom) Jackie Oliver	BRM	63	+ 2 Laps	12	1
7	12	(Mexico) Pedro Rodríguez	Ferrari	63	+ 2 Laps	15	
8	16	(France) Johnny Servoz-Gavin	Matra-Ford	63	+ 2 Laps	14	
9	21	(United States) Pete Lovely	Lotus-Ford	62	+ 3 Laps	16	
10	18	(United Kingdom) Piers Courage	Brabham-Ford	61	+ 4 Laps	9	
11	19	(Switzerland) Silvio Moser	Brabham-Ford	60	Fuel Leak	13	
Ret	14	(United Kingdom) John Surtees	BRM	53	Gearbox	10	
Ret	2	(Austria) Jochen Rindt	Lotus-Ford	21	Suspension	6	
Ret	22	(Canada) George Eaton	BRM	6	Gearbox	17	
Ret	10	(Switzerland) Jo Siffert	Lotus-Ford	4	Accident	5	
Ret	9	(United Kingdom) John Miles	Lotus-Ford	3	Fuel Pump	11	
DNS	6	(New Zealand) Bruce McLaren	McLaren-Ford	0	Fuel Injection	7	

== Notes ==
- This race marked the 49th and 50th podium finish for Brabham.
- This was the third win of the Mexican Grand Prix by a Ford-powered car, setting a new record. It broke the old record set by Climax at the 1964 Mexican Grand Prix.

== Final Championship standings ==
- **Bold text** indicates the World Champions.

Drivers' Championship standings

	Pos	Driver	Points
	1	(United Kingdom) **Jackie Stewart**	63
	2	(Belgium) Jacky Ickx	37
	3	(New Zealand) Bruce McLaren	26
	4	(Austria) Jochen Rindt	22
1	5	(France) Jean-Pierre Beltoise	21

Constructors' Championship standings

	Pos	Constructor	Points
	1	(France) **Matra-Ford**	66
	2	(United Kingdom) Brabham-Ford	49 (51)
	3	(United Kingdom) Lotus-Ford	47
	4	(United Kingdom) McLaren-Ford	38 (40)
1	5	(United Kingdom) BRM	7

- Note: Only the top five positions are included for both sets of standings. Only the best 5 results from the first 6 rounds and the best 4 results from the last 5 rounds counted towards the Championship. Numbers without parentheses are Championship points; numbers in parentheses are total points scored.

Previous race: 1969 United States Grand Prix	FIA Formula One World Championship; 1969 season	Next race: 1970 South African Grand Prix
Previous race: 1968 Mexican Grand Prix	Mexican Grand Prix	Next race: 1970 Mexican Grand Prix
