= 1971 Canadian Grand Prix =

Race details
- Date: September 19, 1971
- Official name: XI Player's Grand Prix Canada
- Location: Mosport Park, Bowmanville, Ontario, Canada
- Course: Permanent racing facility
- Course length: 3.957 km (2.459 miles)
- Distance: 64 laps, 253.248 km (157.376 miles)
- Weather: Rainy and foggy with temperatures approaching 17.8 °C (64.0 °F); wind speeds up to 8 kilometres per hour (5.0 mph)

Pole position
Driver	(United Kingdom) Jackie Stewart	Tyrrell-Ford
- Time: 1:15.3

Fastest lap
Driver	(New Zealand) Denny Hulme	McLaren-Ford
- Time: 1:43.5

Podium
First	(United Kingdom) Jackie Stewart	Tyrrell-Ford
Second	(Sweden) Ronnie Peterson	March-Ford
Third	(United States) Mark Donohue	McLaren-Ford

The 1971 Canadian Grand Prix was a Formula One motor race held at Mosport Park on September 19, 1971. It was race 10 of 11 in both the 1971 World Championship of Drivers and the 1971 International Cup for Formula One Manufacturers.

During a Formula Ford preliminary race, one of the twenty drivers of the field spun at Turn 1 involving four other competitors and a group of marshals. Four of them suffered severe injuries and were taken to hospital. One lap later, Wayne Kelly, a 37-year-old driver from Ottawa, was killed instantly when he crashed into a stationary ambulance parked on the outside of Turn 1 whose crew was helping the injured marshals and competitors.

The events of the Formula Ford race meant that the Grand Prix was delayed from its 2:30pm start to 4:30pm, and when it did start, it was raining and thick fog had arrived. Jackie Stewart took the win after the race was stopped after 64 laps of the scheduled 80 due to the weather. American Mark Donohue finished third on his F1 debut.

This was the first ever Formula One race to be red flagged.

== Qualifying ==
=== Qualifying classification ===
Pos.	No.	Driver	Constructor	Time	Grid
1	11	(United Kingdom) Jackie Stewart	Tyrrell-Ford	1:15.3	1
2	14	(Switzerland) Jo Siffert	BRM	1:15.5	2
3	12	(France) François Cevert	Tyrrell-Ford	1:15.7	3
4	2	(Brazil) Emerson Fittipaldi	Lotus-Ford	1:16.1	4
5	20	(New Zealand) Chris Amon	Matra	1:16.1	5
6	17	(Sweden) Ronnie Peterson	March-Ford	1:16.2	6
7	3	(Sweden) Reine Wisell	Lotus-Ford	1:16.3	7
8	10	(United States) Mark Donohue	McLaren-Ford	1:16.3	8
9	16	(New Zealand) Howden Ganley	BRM	1:16.3	9
10	9	(New Zealand) Denny Hulme	McLaren-Ford	1:16.4	10
11	21	(France) Jean-Pierre Beltoise	Matra	1:16.5	11
12	4	(Belgium) Jacky Ickx	Ferrari	1:16.5	12
13	6	(United States) Mario Andretti	Ferrari	1:16.9	13
14	22	(United Kingdom) John Surtees	Surtees-Ford	1:17.1	14
15	37	(United Kingdom) Graham Hill	Brabham-Ford	1:17.2	15
16	15	(United Kingdom) Peter Gethin	BRM	1:17.2	16
17	8	(Australia) Tim Schenken	Brabham-Ford	1:17.4	17
18	5	(Switzerland) Clay Regazzoni	Ferrari	1:17.5	18
19	31	(Austria) Helmut Marko	BRM	1:17.8	19
20	18	(Italy) Nanni Galli	March-Ford	1:18.2	20
21	28	(Canada) George Eaton	BRM	1:18.4	21
22	19	(United Kingdom) Mike Beuttler	March-Ford	1:18.5	22
23	24	(Germany) Rolf Stommelen	Surtees-Ford	1:18.8	23
24	33	(United States) Skip Barber	March-Ford	1:19.8	24
25	26	(United Kingdom) Chris Craft	Brabham-Ford	1:20.3	DNS
26	35	(United States) Pete Lovely	Lotus-Ford	1:21.1	25
27	27	(France) Henri Pescarolo	March-Ford	1:21.9	DNS

== Race ==
=== Classification ===
Pos	No	Driver	Constructor	Laps	Time/Retired	Grid	Points
1	11	(United Kingdom) Jackie Stewart	Tyrrell-Ford	64	1:55:12.9	1	9
2	17	(Sweden) Ronnie Peterson	March-Ford	64	+ 38.3	6	6
3	10	(United States) Mark Donohue	McLaren-Ford	64	+ 1:35.8	8	4
4	9	(New Zealand) Denny Hulme	McLaren-Ford	63	+ 1 lap	10	3
5	3	(Sweden) Reine Wisell	Lotus-Ford	63	+ 1 lap	7	2
6	12	(France) François Cevert	Tyrrell-Ford	62	+ 2 laps	3	1
7	2	(Brazil) Emerson Fittipaldi	Lotus-Ford	62	+ 2 laps	4	
8	4	(Belgium) Jacky Ickx	Ferrari	62	+ 2 laps	12	
9	14	(Switzerland) Jo Siffert	BRM	61	+ 3 laps	2	
10	20	(New Zealand) Chris Amon	Matra	61	+ 3 laps	5	
11	22	(United Kingdom) John Surtees	Surtees-Ford	60	+ 4 laps	14	
12	31	(Austria) Helmut Marko	BRM	60	+ 4 laps	19	
13	6	(United States) Mario Andretti	Ferrari	60	+ 4 laps	13	
14	15	(United Kingdom) Peter Gethin	BRM	59	+ 5 laps	16	
15	28	(Canada) George Eaton	BRM	59	+ 5 laps	21	
16	18	(Italy) Nanni Galli	March-Ford	57	+ 7 laps	20	
NC	19	(United Kingdom) Mike Beuttler	March-Ford	56	+ 8 laps	22	
NC	35	(United States) Pete Lovely	Lotus-Ford	55	+ 9 laps	25	
Ret	24	(Germany) Rolf Stommelen	Surtees-Ford	26	Overheating	23	
Ret	21	(France) Jean-Pierre Beltoise	Matra	15	Accident	11	
Ret	33	(United States) Skip Barber	March-Ford	13	Oil Pressure	24	
Ret	5	(Switzerland) Clay Regazzoni	Ferrari	7	Accident	18	
Ret	37	(United Kingdom) Graham Hill	Brabham-Ford	2	Accident	15	
Ret	8	(Australia) Tim Schenken	Brabham-Ford	1	Ignition	17	
DNS	16	(New Zealand) Howden Ganley	BRM	—	Accident	9	
DNS	26	(United Kingdom) Chris Craft	Brabham-Ford	—	Engine		
DNS	27	(France) Henri Pescarolo	March-Ford	—	Accident/injury		

== Notes ==
- This was the Formula One World Championship debut for future Indianapolis 500 winner and American driver Mark Donohue and British driver Chris Craft.
- This was the 50th Grand Prix start for French constructor Matra.
- This was the first fastest lap set by McLaren.
- This race saw the 99th, 100th and 101st podium finish for a Ford-powered car.

== Championship standings after the race ==
Drivers' Championship standings

Pos	Driver	Points
1	(United Kingdom) **Jackie Stewart**	60
2	(Sweden) Ronnie Peterson	29
3	(Belgium) Jacky Ickx	19
4	(France) François Cevert	17
5	(Brazil) Emerson Fittipaldi	16

Constructors' Championship standings

Pos	Constructor	Points
1	(United Kingdom) **Tyrrell-Ford**	64
2	(Italy) Ferrari	32
3	(United Kingdom) BRM	30
4	(United Kingdom) March-Ford	30
5	(United Kingdom) Lotus-Ford	21

- Note: Only the top five positions are included for both sets of standings.
- Bold text indicates the 1971 World Champions.

Previous race: 1971 Italian Grand Prix	FIA Formula One World Championship; 1971 season	Next race: 1971 United States Grand Prix
Previous race: 1970 Canadian Grand Prix	Canadian Grand Prix	Next race: 1972 Canadian Grand Prix
