= 1970 Spanish Grand Prix =

- Jarama Permanent Circuit (1967-1990)

Race details
- Date: 19 April 1970
- Official name: XVI Gran Premio de España
- Location: Circuito Permanente del Jarama, Madrid, Spain
- Course: Race track
- Course length: 3.404 km (2.115 miles)
- Distance: 90 laps, 306.360 km (190.363 miles)
- Weather: Very hot, Dry

Pole position
Driver	(Australia) Jack Brabham	Brabham-Ford
- Time: 1:23.90

Fastest lap
Driver	(Australia) Jack Brabham	Brabham-Ford
- Time: 1:24.3 on lap 19

Podium
First	(United Kingdom) Jackie Stewart	March-Ford
Second	(New Zealand) Bruce McLaren	McLaren-Ford
Third	(United States) Mario Andretti	March-Ford

The 1970 Spanish Grand Prix was a Formula One motor race held at the Jarama circuit on 19 April 1970. It was race 2 of 13 in both the 1970 World Championship of Drivers and the 1970 International Cup for Formula One Manufacturers.

Prior to the race, the organisers of the Grand Prix sparked anger amongst the members of FOCA when they limited the number of starters to only sixteen. To add to the chaos, none of the laps set on Friday were counted towards qualifying. On the morning before the race, the matter seemed resolved and the organisers initially reversed their decision, and those who failed to qualify looked as if they would be allowed to start. The Commission Sportive Internationale then stepped in and forced the Spanish organisers to revert to the original limit of sixteen starters, and the cars that failed to qualify were wheeled off the grid.

The race was won by defending world champion Jackie Stewart, driving a March 701 car entered by a privateer Tyrrell team. This was the last win of a privately entered car in Formula One. American driver Mario Andretti took his first Formula One podium in third place. The race was marred by a serious accident involving Jackie Oliver and Jacky Ickx. Both their cars burst into flames, and Ickx was slightly burned after his race overalls became soaked in burning fuel. He recovered sufficiently to be able to compete in the next race, at Monaco. Bruce McLaren scored his last podium, points and race finish.

== Qualifying ==
=== Qualifying classification ===
Pos.	Driver	Constructor	Time	No
1	(Australia) Jack Brabham	Brabham-Ford	1:23.9	1
2	(New Zealand) Denny Hulme	McLaren-Ford	1:24.1	2
3	(United Kingdom) Jackie Stewart	March-Ford	1:24.2	3
4	(France) Jean-Pierre Beltoise	Matra	1:24.46	4
5	(Mexico) Pedro Rodríguez	BRM	1:24.5	5
6	(New Zealand) Chris Amon	March-Ford	1:24.65	6
7	(Belgium) Jacky Ickx	Ferrari	1:24.7	7
8	(Austria) Jochen Rindt	Lotus-Ford	1:24.8	8
9	(France) Henri Pescarolo	Matra	1:24.9	9
10	(United Kingdom) Jackie Oliver	BRM	1:25.0	10
11	(New Zealand) Bruce McLaren	McLaren-Ford	1:25.0	11
DNQ	(Germany) Rolf Stommelen	Brabham-Ford	1:25.1	16^{1}
DNQ	(Italy) Andrea de Adamich	McLaren-Alfa Romeo	1:25.15	—
14	(United Kingdom) John Surtees	McLaren-Ford	1:25.2	12
DNQ	(United Kingdom) John Miles	Lotus-Ford	1:25.3	—
DNQ	(Switzerland) Jo Siffert	March-Ford	1:25.38	—
17	(United Kingdom) Piers Courage	De Tomaso-Ford	1:25.44	DNS
18	(France) Johnny Servoz-Gavin	March-Ford	1:25.46	13
19	(United Kingdom) Graham Hill	Lotus-Ford	1:25.54	14
20	(United States) Mario Andretti	March-Ford	1:25.7	15
DNQ	(Spain) Alex Soler-Roig	Lotus-Ford	1:25.8	—
DNQ	(Canada) George Eaton	BRM	1:26.4	—

== Race ==
=== Classification ===
Pos	No	Driver	Constructor	Laps	Time/Retired	Grid	Points
1	1	(United Kingdom) Jackie Stewart	March-Ford	90	2:10:58.2	3	9
2	11	(New Zealand) Bruce McLaren	McLaren-Ford	89	+ 1 Lap	11	6
3	18	(United States) Mario Andretti	March-Ford	89	+ 1 Lap	16	4
4	6	(United Kingdom) Graham Hill	Lotus-Ford	89	+ 1 Lap	15	3
5	16	(France) Johnny Servoz-Gavin	March-Ford	88	+ 2 Laps	14	2
Ret	8	(United Kingdom) John Surtees	McLaren-Ford	76	Gearbox	12	
Ret	7	(Australia) Jack Brabham	Brabham-Ford	61	Engine	1	
Ret	24	(Germany) Rolf Stommelen	Brabham-Ford	43	Engine	17	
Ret	22	(France) Henri Pescarolo	Matra	33	Engine	9	
Ret	4	(France) Jean-Pierre Beltoise	Matra	31	Engine	4	
Ret	5	(New Zealand) Denny Hulme	McLaren-Ford	10	Ignition	2	
Ret	9	(New Zealand) Chris Amon	March-Ford	10	Engine	6	
Ret	3	(Austria) Jochen Rindt	Lotus-Ford	9	Ignition	8	
WD	10	(Mexico) Pedro Rodríguez	BRM	4	Withdrew	5	
Ret	2	(Belgium) Jacky Ickx	Ferrari	0	Accident	7	
Ret	15	(United Kingdom) Jackie Oliver	BRM	0	Accident	10	
DNS	12	(United Kingdom) Piers Courage	De Tomaso-Ford	0	Practice Accident	13	
DNQ	20	(Italy) Andrea de Adamich	McLaren-Alfa Romeo				
DNQ	19	(United Kingdom) John Miles	Lotus-Ford				
DNQ	14	(Switzerland) Jo Siffert	March-Ford				
DNQ	21	(Canada) George Eaton	BRM				
DNQ	23	(Spain) Alex Soler-Roig	Lotus-Ford				

== Notes ==
- This was the Formula One World Championship debut for Spanish driver Alex Soler-Roig.
- This was Jackie Stewart's second win of a Spanish Grand Prix. He broke the old record set by Juan Manuel Fangio at the 1951 Spanish Grand Prix.
- This race marked the first Formula One World Championship Grand Prix win for British constructor March.

== Championship standings after the race ==
Drivers' Championship standings

	Pos	Driver	Points
2	1	(United Kingdom) Jackie Stewart	13
1	2	(Australia) Jack Brabham	9
1	3	(New Zealand) Denny Hulme	6
10	4	(New Zealand) Bruce McLaren	6
9	5	(United States) Mario Andretti	4

Constructors' Championship standings

	Pos	Constructor	Points
2	1	(United Kingdom) March-Ford	13
	2	(United Kingdom) McLaren-Ford	12
2	3	(United Kingdom) Brabham-Ford	9
1	4	(United Kingdom) Lotus-Ford	5
1	5	(France) Matra	3

- Note: Only the top five positions are included for both sets of standings.

Previous race: 1970 South African Grand Prix	FIA Formula One World Championship; 1970 season	Next race: 1970 Monaco Grand Prix
Previous race: 1969 Spanish Grand Prix	Spanish Grand Prix	Next race: 1971 Spanish Grand Prix
