= 1970 South African Grand Prix =

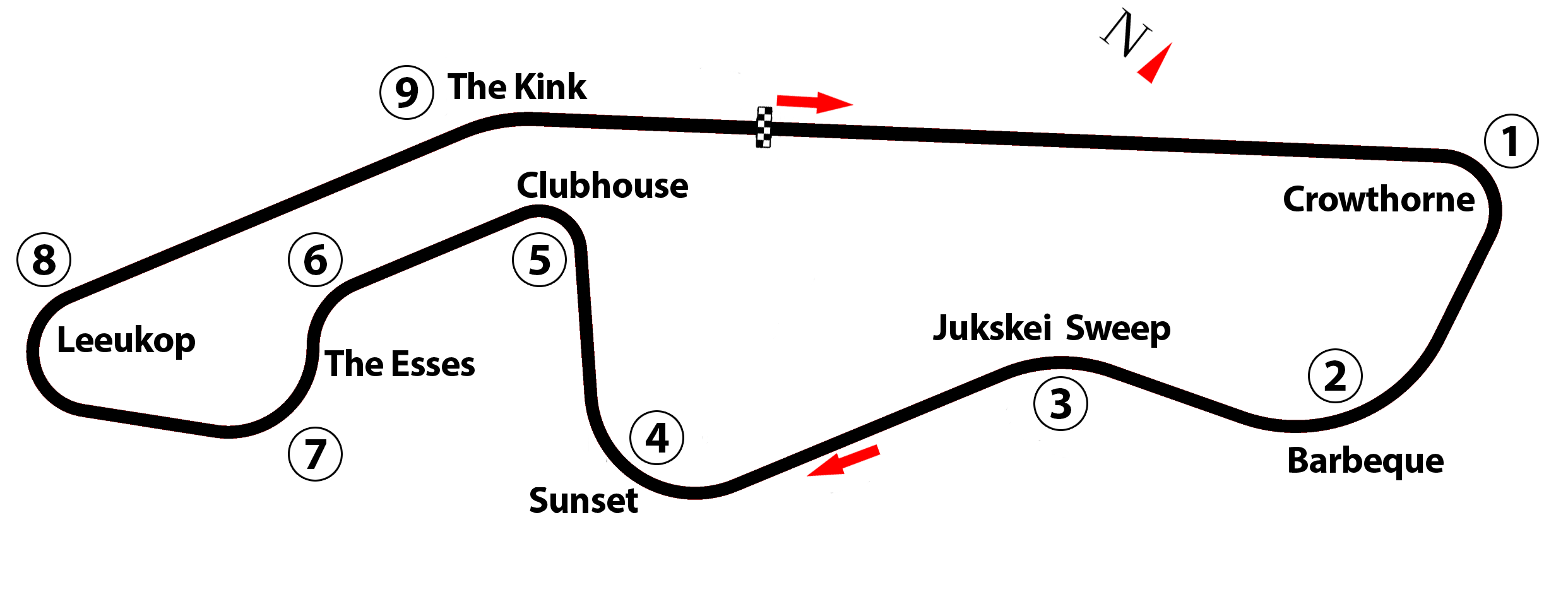
- The Kyalami Circuit (1967–1985)

Race details
- Date: 7 March 1970
- Official name: Fourth AA Grand Prix of South Africa
- Location: Kyalami, Midrand, Transvaal Province, South Africa
- Course: Permanent racing facility
- Course length: 4.104 km (2.550 miles)
- Distance: 80 laps, 328.320 km (204.009 miles)
- Weather: Very hot, Dry

Pole position
Driver	(United Kingdom) Jackie Stewart	March-Ford
- Time: 1:19.3

Fastest lap
Driver	(Australia) Jack Brabham (Note: Some sources credit both Brabham and John Surtees with fastest lap. See the discussion page for further information)	Brabham-Ford
- Time: 1:20.8 on lap 71

Podium
First	(Australia) Jack Brabham	Brabham-Ford
Second	(New Zealand) Denny Hulme	McLaren-Ford
Third	(United Kingdom) Jackie Stewart	March-Ford

The 1970 South African Grand Prix, formally titled the Fourth AA Grand Prix of South Africa (Afrikaans: Vierde AA Suid-Afrikaanse Grand Prix), was a Formula One motor race held at Kyalami Circuit on 7 March 1970. It was race 1 of 13 in both the 1970 World Championship of Drivers and the 1970 International Cup for Formula One Manufacturers. It was also the 14th and last Formula One victory for triple world champion Jack Brabham, and at age 43, was the last driver to win a Formula One race over the age of 40 until Nigel Mansell at the 1994 Australian Grand Prix.

Two time World Champion and five time Monaco Grand Prix winner Graham Hill, driving a Lotus 49C for Rob Walker, made his return to racing after a life-threatening crash in the 1969 United States Grand Prix. Despite extensive knee surgery that left Hill with minimal mobility, he finished sixth. Hill rated this achievement as among his finest. After the race, he could not get out of the car by himself and had to be lifted out.

== Qualifying ==
=== Qualifying classification ===
Pos	No	Driver	Constructor	Team	Time	Gap
1	1	(United Kingdom) Jackie Stewart	March-Ford	Tyrrell Racing Organisation	1:19.3	
2	15	(New Zealand) Chris Amon	March-Ford	March Engineering	1:19.3	-
3	12	(Australia) Jack Brabham	Brabham-Ford	Motor Racing Developments Ltd	1:19.6	+0.3
4	9	(Austria) Jochen Rindt	Lotus-Ford	Gold Leaf Team Lotus	1:19.9	+0.6
5	17	(Belgium) Jacky Ickx	Ferrari	Scuderia Ferrari SpA SEFAC	1:20.0	+0.7
6	6	(New Zealand) Denny Hulme	McLaren-Ford	Bruce McLaren Motor Racing	1:20.1	+0.8
7	7	(United Kingdom) John Surtees	McLaren-Ford	Team Surtees	1:20.2	+0.9
8	3	(France) Jean-Pierre Beltoise	Matra	Equipe Matra Elf	1:20.2	+0.9
9	16	(Switzerland) Jo Siffert	March-Ford	March Engineering	1:20.2	+0.9
10	5	(New Zealand) Bruce McLaren	McLaren-Ford	Bruce McLaren Motor Racing	1:20.3	+1.0
11	8	(United States) Mario Andretti	March-Ford	STP Corporation	1:20.5	+1.2
12	19	(United Kingdom) Jackie Oliver	BRM	Owen Racing Organisation	1:20.9	+1.6
13	25	(South Africa) Dave Charlton	Lotus-Ford	Scuderia Scribante	1:20.9	+1.6
14	10	(United Kingdom) John Miles	Lotus-Ford	Gold Leaf Team Lotus	1:21.0	+1.7
15	14	(Germany) Rolf Stommelen	Brabham-Ford	Auto Motor Und Sport	1:21.2	+1.9
16	20	(Mexico) Pedro Rodríguez	BRM	Owen Racing Organisation	1:21.3	+2.0
17	2	(France) Johnny Servoz-Gavin	March-Ford	Tyrrell Racing Organisation	1:21.4	+2.1
18	4	(France) Henri Pescarolo	Matra	Equipe Matra Elf	1:21.5	+2.2
19	11	(United Kingdom) Graham Hill	Lotus-Ford	Rob Walker Racing Team	1:21.6	+2.3
20	22	(United Kingdom) Piers Courage	De Tomaso-Ford	Frank Williams Racing Cars	1:22.0	+2.7
21	24	(South Africa) Peter de Klerk	Brabham-Ford	Team Gunston	1:22.7	+3.4
22	23	(Rhodesia) John Love	Lotus-Ford	Team Gunston	1:23.1	+3.8
23	21	(Canada) George Eaton	BRM	Owen Racing Organisation	1:24.6	+5.3

== Classification ==
Pos	No	Driver	Constructor	Laps	Time/Retired	Grid	Points
1	12	(Australia) Jack Brabham	Brabham-Ford	80	1:49:34.6	3	9
2	6	(New Zealand) Denny Hulme	McLaren-Ford	80	+8.1	6	6
3	1	(United Kingdom) Jackie Stewart	March-Ford	80	+17.1	1	4
4	3	(France) Jean-Pierre Beltoise	Matra	80	+1:13.1	8	3
5	10	(United Kingdom) John Miles	Lotus-Ford	79	+1 lap	14	2
6	11	(United Kingdom) Graham Hill	Lotus-Ford	79	+1 lap	19	1
7	4	(France) Henri Pescarolo	Matra	78	+2 laps	18	
8	23	(Rhodesia) John Love	Lotus-Ford	78	+2 laps	22	
9	20	(Mexico) Pedro Rodríguez	BRM	76	+4 laps	16	
10	16	(Switzerland) Jo Siffert	March-Ford	75	+5 laps	9	
11	24	(South Africa) Peter de Klerk	Brabham-Ford	75	+5 laps	21	
12	25	(South Africa) Dave Charlton	Lotus-Ford	73	Engine	13	
13	9	(Austria) Jochen Rindt	Lotus-Ford	72	Engine	4	
Ret	17	(Belgium) Jacky Ickx	Ferrari	60	Engine	5	
Ret	7	(United Kingdom) John Surtees	McLaren-Ford	60	Engine	7	
Ret	21	(Canada) George Eaton	BRM	58	Engine	23	
Ret	2	(France) Johnny Servoz-Gavin	March-Ford	57	Engine	17	
Ret	5	(New Zealand) Bruce McLaren	McLaren-Ford	39	Engine	10	
Ret	22	(United Kingdom) Piers Courage	De Tomaso-Ford	39	Accident	20	
Ret	8	(United States) Mario Andretti	March-Ford	26	Overheating	11	
Ret	14	(Germany) Rolf Stommelen	Brabham-Ford	23	Engine	15	
Ret	19	(United Kingdom) Jackie Oliver	BRM	22	Gearbox	12	
Ret	15	(New Zealand) Chris Amon	March-Ford	14	Overheating	2	
DNS	11	(United Kingdom) Brian Redman	Lotus-Ford		Car raced by Graham Hill		

== Championship standings after the race ==
Drivers' Championship standings

Pos	Driver	Points
1	(Australia) Jack Brabham	9
2	(New Zealand) Denny Hulme	6
3	(United Kingdom) Jackie Stewart	4
4	(France) Jean-Pierre Beltoise	3
5	(United Kingdom) John Miles	2

Constructors' Championship standings

Pos	Constructor	Points
1	(United Kingdom) Brabham-Ford	9
2	(United Kingdom) McLaren-Ford	6
3	(United Kingdom) March-Ford	4
4	(France) Matra	3
5	(United Kingdom) Lotus-Ford	2

- Note: Only the top five positions are included for both sets of standings.

== Notes ==
- This race marked the 50th podium finish for a New Zealand driver.
- This was Formula One World Championship debut for British constructor March. It also was their first pole position and podium finish.
- This was the third win of a South African Grand Prix by a Ford-powered car. It broke the old record set by Coventry Climax at the 1965 South African Grand Prix.

== Additional information ==
Previous race: 1969 Mexican Grand Prix	FIA Formula One World Championship; 1970 season	Next race: 1970 Spanish Grand Prix
Previous race: 1969 South African Grand Prix	South African Grand Prix	Next race: 1971 South African Grand Prix
