= 1969 United States Grand Prix =

Race details
- Date: October 5, 1969
- Official name: XII United States Grand Prix
- Location: Watkins Glen Grand Prix Race Course; Watkins Glen, New York
- Course: Permanent road course
- Course length: 3.78 km (2.35 miles)
- Distance: 108 laps, 408.2 km (253.8 miles)
- Weather: Dry with temperatures reaching up to 18 °C (64 °F); Wind speeds up to 18.70 km/h (11.62 mph)

Pole position
Driver	(Austria) Jochen Rindt	Lotus-Ford
- Time: 1:03.62

Fastest lap
Driver	(Austria) Jochen Rindt	Lotus-Ford
- Time: 1:04.34 on lap 69

Podium
First	(Austria) Jochen Rindt	Lotus-Ford
Second	(United Kingdom) Piers Courage	Brabham-Ford
Third	(United Kingdom) John Surtees	BRM

The 1969 United States Grand Prix was a Formula One motor race held on October 5, 1969, at the Watkins Glen Grand Prix Race Course in Watkins Glen, New York. It was race 10 of 11 in both the 1969 World Championship of Drivers and the 1969 International Cup for Formula One Manufacturers. The 108-lap race was won by Lotus driver Jochen Rindt after he started from pole position. Piers Courage finished second for the Brabham team and BRM driver John Surtees came in third.

== Qualifying ==
=== Qualifying ===
Pos	No	Driver	Constructor	Time	Gap
1	2	(Austria) Jochen Rindt	Lotus-Ford	1:03.62	—
2	5	(New Zealand) Denny Hulme	McLaren-Ford	1:03.65	+0.03
3	3	(United Kingdom) Jackie Stewart	Matra-Ford	1:03.77	+0.15
4	1	(United Kingdom) Graham Hill	Lotus-Ford	1:04.05	+0.43
5	10	(Switzerland) Jo Siffert	Lotus-Ford	1:04.06	+0.44
6	6	(New Zealand) Bruce McLaren	McLaren-Ford	1:04.22	+0.60
7	4	(France) Jean-Pierre Beltoise	Matra-Ford	1:04.29	+0.67
8	7	(Belgium) Jacky Ickx	Brabham-Ford	1:04.32	+0.70
9	18	(United Kingdom) Piers Courage	Brabham-Ford	1:04.58	+0.96
10	8	(Australia) Jack Brabham	Brabham-Ford	1:04.80	+1.18
11	14	(United Kingdom) John Surtees	BRM	1:05.06	+1.44
12	12	(Mexico) Pedro Rodríguez	Ferrari	1:05.94	+2.32
13	9	(United States) Mario Andretti	Lotus-Ford	1:06.52	+2.90
14	15	(United Kingdom) Jackie Oliver	BRM	1:06.55	+2.93
15	16	(France) Johnny Servoz-Gavin	Matra-Ford	1:07.13	+3.51
16	21	(United States) Pete Lovely	Lotus-Ford	1:07.55	+3.93
17	19	(Switzerland) Silvio Moser	Brabham-Ford	1:08.20	+4.58
18	22	(Canada) George Eaton	BRM	1:11.27	+7.65

== Race ==
=== Summary ===
Jochen Rindt survived an early duel with newly crowned Champion and close friend Jackie Stewart and claimed his first Grand Prix victory, the first ever by an Austrian. Piers Courage finished second, driving a Frank Williams-prepared Brabham and out-racing Jack Brabham himself and Jacky Ickx in the works Brabhams. John Surtees took third place at The Glen for the second straight year, this time in a BRM.

After five wins in his first four seasons, Jackie Stewart won five of the first six races in 1969, and his first Driver's Championship was already in his pocket when the teams came to North America for the final three races.

Jochen Rindt, on the other hand, had flirted with his first victory throughout the season, his first with Lotus, but without success. He had started on the pole four times, led in five of the nine races, and taken back-to-back podiums in the two preceding races in Italy and Canada.

Also driving for Lotus were the previous year's Champion, Graham Hill, and American Mario Andretti, making just his third F1 appearance of the season. Andretti was doing his best with the controversial and soon-to-be-abandoned four-wheel-drive Type 63, while Hill and Rindt were in standard 49Bs.

Friday practice was wet and virtually meaningless, except that it showed the four-wheel-drive Matra and Lotus cars had little or no advantage even in the rain, and the concept quickly disappeared from modern GP racing. Saturday was dry, however, and Rindt won the battle for pole, his fifth of the season, beating Denny Hulme's McLaren by three-hundredths in the last fifteen minutes of the session. The rest of the top six were Stewart, Hill, Jo Siffert (in a Rob Walker-entered Lotus) and Bruce McLaren.

On Sunday, before a crowd of over 100,000, Rindt jumped into the lead at the start, while Hulme struggled with a bent gear linkage and lost places to Stewart and Hill. Andretti charged ahead from his thirteenth-place grid position, and, when Brabham slowed to avoid Hulme, Andretti bumped rear wheels with the Brabham, knocking the Lotus sideways. Andretti continued for three laps, but his suspension was bent, and he retired. At the end of the first lap, the order was Rindt, Stewart, Hill, Siffert, Jean-Pierre Beltoise, Courage and Ickx.

As they had many times during the season, Rindt and Stewart quickly separated themselves from the rest of the field. On lap 12, Rindt slid wide and allowed Stewart through. The Matra's engine was not running at full strength, however, and it was all Stewart could do to hold off the Austrian, who was bobbing and weaving on both sides, trying to get by. Rindt finally got past on the straight on lap 21, and eventually, the Scot began to fall back.

On lap 33, Stewart's car emitted a puff of smoke, and the next time around, he coasted down the pit lane with no oil pressure. Rindt now led a group of three Brabhams, with Courage ahead of the two works entries of Ickx and Brabham, by 37 seconds. On lap 62, Brabham got by Ickx and began hounding Courage. Several times, the Australian managed to pull alongside, but could not complete the pass. Ickx dropped out of the three-way fight on lap 78 when he suddenly lost oil pressure and pulled to the side of the track.

Rindt was content to maintain his cushion over Courage and Brabham. On lap 88, Hill spun off the track on a patch of oil and stalled. He unfastened his straps, got out of the car and push-started it, but could not refasten his belts alone. His off-track excursion had apparently punctured a rear tire, and he signalled the pit to get ready to change it. Before he made it back around, however, the tire exploded at the end of the straight and sent the Lotus cartwheeling into an embankment. Hill was thrown from the car and suffered broken bones in both legs. Later, at the hospital, he was asked by team members if he had a message to pass along to his wife. Hill replied, "Just tell her that I won't be dancing for two weeks." Hill's accident was witnessed by two fifteen-year-old boys from nearby Montrose, Pennsylvania, John Moore and Kevin Hibbard. Their eyewitness account stated that "It looked like the crash was unsurvivable. We thought he had definitely been killed."

Brabham had to break off his pursuit of Courage when his engine began sputtering for lack of fuel, and he was forced to pit on lap 93, allowing Surtees to get through into third place. Rindt crossed the line 46 seconds ahead of Courage with his long-awaited first win. He said, "It is just that the car held together for once, but this one makes up for all the others I have lost." Once again, the American race offered a record purse, and the total of $206,000 included $50,000 for the winner.

== Classification ==
Pos	No	Driver	Constructor	Laps	Time/Retired	Grid	Points
1	2	(Austria) Jochen Rindt	Lotus-Ford	108	1:57:56.84	1	9
2	18	(United Kingdom) Piers Courage	Brabham-Ford	108	+ 46.99	9	6
3	14	(United Kingdom) John Surtees	BRM	106	+ 2 laps	11	4
4	8	(Australia) Jack Brabham	Brabham-Ford	106	+ 2 laps	10	3
5	12	(Mexico) Pedro Rodríguez	Ferrari	101	+ 7 laps	12	2
6	19	(Switzerland) Silvio Moser	Brabham-Ford	98	+ 10 laps	17	1
NC	16	(France) Johnny Servoz-Gavin	Matra-Ford	92	+ 16 laps	15	
Ret	1	(United Kingdom) Graham Hill	Lotus-Ford	90	Accident	4	
Ret	7	(Belgium) Jacky Ickx	Brabham-Ford	77	Engine	8	
Ret	22	(Canada) George Eaton	BRM	76	Engine	18	
Ret	4	(France) Jean-Pierre Beltoise	Matra-Ford	72	Engine	7	
Ret	5	(New Zealand) Denny Hulme	McLaren-Ford	52	Gearbox	2	
Ret	3	(United Kingdom) Jackie Stewart	Matra-Ford	35	Engine	3	
Ret	21	(United States) Pete Lovely	Lotus-Ford	25	Halfshaft	16	
Ret	15	(United Kingdom) Jackie Oliver	BRM	23	Engine	14	
Ret	10	(Switzerland) Jo Siffert	Lotus-Ford	3	Fuel system	5	
Ret	9	(United States) Mario Andretti	Lotus-Ford	3	Suspension	13	
DNS	6	(New Zealand) Bruce McLaren	McLaren-Ford	0	Engine	6	

== Notes ==
- This was the Formula One World Championship debut for Canadian driver George Eaton.
- In the 50th official Formula One World Championship Grand Prix for an Austrian driver, Jochen Rindt won his first race with a Grand Slam. It was the first Grand Prix win and Grand Slam for an Austrian driver.
- This race marked the 50th pole position for Lotus.
- This race marked the 100th race for a Swiss driver. In those 100 races, Swiss drivers had won 1 Grand Prix, achieved 6 podium finishes, 1 pole position, and 3 fastest laps.
- This was the 113th race start for Graham Hill, setting a new record. However, this record would be equalled by Jack Brabham at the next race.

== Championship standings after the race ==
- **Bold text** indicates the World Champions.

Drivers' Championship standings

	Pos	Driver	Points
	1	(United Kingdom) **Jackie Stewart**	60
	2	(Belgium) Jacky Ickx	31
	3	(New Zealand) Bruce McLaren	26
3	4	(Austria) Jochen Rindt	22
1	5	(United Kingdom) Graham Hill	19

Constructors' Championship standings

	Pos	Constructor	Points
	1	(France) **Matra-Ford**	63
1	2	(United Kingdom) Lotus-Ford	47
1	3	(United Kingdom) Brabham-Ford	45
	4	(United Kingdom) McLaren-Ford	29 (31)
	5	(Italy) Ferrari	7

- Note: Only the top five positions are included for both sets of standings. Only the best 5 results from the first 6 rounds and the best 4 results from the last 5 rounds counted towards the Championship. Numbers without parentheses are Championship points; numbers in parentheses are total points scored.

Previous race: 1969 Canadian Grand Prix	FIA Formula One World Championship; 1969 season	Next race: 1969 Mexican Grand Prix
Previous race: 1968 United States Grand Prix	United States Grand Prix	Next race: 1970 United States Grand Prix
