= 1971 South African Grand Prix =

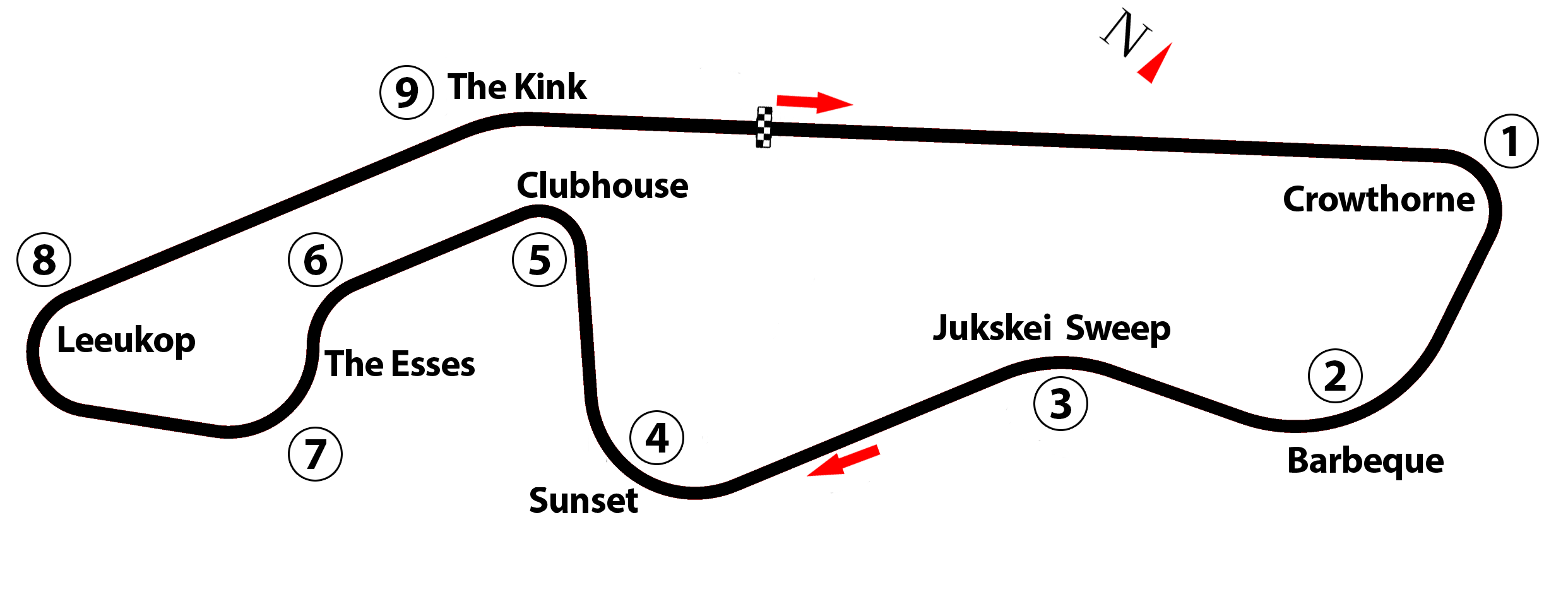
- The Kyalami Circuit (1967–1985)

Race details
- Date: 6 March 1971
- Official name: Fifth AA Grand Prix of South Africa
- Location: Kyalami, Midrand, Transvaal Province, South Africa
- Course: Permanent racing facility
- Course length: 4.104 km (2.550 miles)
- Distance: 79 laps, 324.216 km (201.458 miles)
- Weather: Sunny, Hot, Dry

Pole position
Driver	(United Kingdom) Jackie Stewart	Tyrrell-Ford
- Time: 1:17.8

Fastest lap
Driver	(United States) Mario Andretti	Ferrari
- Time: 1:20.3 on lap 73

Podium
First	(United States) Mario Andretti	Ferrari
Second	(United Kingdom) Jackie Stewart	Tyrrell-Ford
Third	(Switzerland) Clay Regazzoni	Ferrari

The 1971 South African Grand Prix, formally the Fifth AA Grand Prix of South Africa (Afrikaans: Vyfde AA Suid-Afrikaanse Grand Prix), was a Formula One motor race held at Kyalami Circuit on 6 March 1971. It was race 1 of 11 in both the 1971 World Championship of Drivers and the 1971 International Cup for Formula One Manufacturers. The race was won by Mario Andretti who was driving for the Ferrari team in what was his first Formula One victory, but would not win another Formula One race until 1976.

== Report ==
It was expected the 12-cylinder cars would be dominant over the V8 Ford-Cosworths as Ferrari had won four out of the last five Grands Prix in 1970, and they had a strong line-up consisting of Mario Andretti, Clay Regazzoni and Jacky Ickx.

Jackie Stewart took pole in the Tyrrell to join Chris Amon and Regazzoni on the front row. Denny Hulme was suffering with a new suspension that he said was behaving very strangely.

Regazzoni led the field away at the start – with both Stewart and Amon suffering slow starts. Emerson Fittipaldi managed to hold off Hulme until lap three when he dived through to chase the Ferraris. On lap 17, he squeezed through under braking and the orange McLaren once again led a race. Pedro Rodríguez was forced to retire from fourth place when his bodywork started to melt and the hot air began burning his feet. The heat also took its toll on Jo Siffert, whose engine overheated and Howden Ganley who was taken ill with heat exhaustion. On lap 37, John Surtees who had steadily been moving up the field, managed to pass Regazzoni. Surtees however, suffered a gearbox failure on lap 57. Andretti took his first career victory, driving a Ferrari; his teammate Regazzoni finished in third place behind Stewart.

== Classification ==
=== Qualifying ===
Pos	No	Driver	Constructor	Time	Gap
1	9	(United Kingdom) Jackie Stewart	Tyrrell-Ford	1:17.8	—
2	19	(New Zealand) Chris Amon	Matra	1:18.4	+0.6
3	5	(Switzerland) Clay Regazzoni	Ferrari	1:18.7	+0.9
4	6	(United States) Mario Andretti	Ferrari	1:19.0	+1.2
5	2	(Brazil) Emerson Fittipaldi	Lotus-Ford	1:19.1	+1.3
6	20	(United Kingdom) John Surtees	Surtees-Ford	1:19.1	+1.3
7	11	(New Zealand) Denny Hulme	McLaren-Ford	1:19.1	+1.3
8	4	(Belgium) Jacky Ickx	Ferrari	1:19.2	+1.4
9	10	(France) François Cevert	Tyrrell-Ford	1:19.2	+1.4
10	16	(Mexico) Pedro Rodríguez	BRM	1:19.3	+1.5
11	12	(United Kingdom) Peter Gethin	McLaren-Ford	1:19.6	+1.8
12	15	(South Africa) Dave Charlton	Brabham-Ford	1:19.8	+2.0
13	7	(Sweden) Ronnie Peterson	March-Ford	1:19.9	+2.1
14	3	(Sweden) Reine Wisell	Lotus-Ford	1:19.9	+2.1
15	21	(Germany) Rolf Stommelen	Surtees-Ford	1:20.1	+2.3
16	17	(Switzerland) Jo Siffert	BRM	1:20.2	+2.4
17	28	(United Kingdom) Brian Redman	Surtees-Ford	1:20.2	+2.4
18	22	(France) Henri Pescarolo	March-Ford	1:20.2	+2.4
19	14	(United Kingdom) Graham Hill	Brabham-Ford	1:20.5	+2.7
20	25	(South Africa) Jackie Pretorius	Brabham-Ford	1:21.7	+3.9
21	24	(Rhodesia) John Love	March-Ford	1:21.9	+4.1
22	8	(Italy) Andrea de Adamich	March-Alfa Romeo	1:22.2	+4.4
23	23	(Sweden) Jo Bonnier	McLaren-Ford	1:22.3	+4.5
24	27	(New Zealand) Howden Ganley	BRM	1:23.7	+5.9
25	26	(Spain) Alex Soler-Roig	March-Ford	1:25.8	+8.0

=== Race ===
Pos	No	Driver	Constructor	Laps	Time/Retired	Grid	Points
1	6	(United States) Mario Andretti	Ferrari	79	1:47:35.5	4	9
2	9	(United Kingdom) Jackie Stewart	Tyrrell-Ford	79	+ 20.9	1	6
3	5	(Switzerland) Clay Regazzoni	Ferrari	79	+ 31.4	3	4
4	3	(Sweden) Reine Wisell	Lotus-Ford	79	+ 1:09.4	14	3
5	19	(New Zealand) Chris Amon	Matra	78	+ 1 Lap	2	2
6	11	(New Zealand) Denny Hulme	McLaren-Ford	78	+ 1 Lap	7	1
7	28	(United Kingdom) Brian Redman	Surtees-Ford	78	+ 1 Lap	17	
8	4	(Belgium) Jacky Ickx	Ferrari	78	+ 1 Lap	8	
9	14	(United Kingdom) Graham Hill	Brabham-Ford	77	+ 2 Laps	19	
10	7	(Sweden) Ronnie Peterson	March-Ford	77	+ 2 Laps	13	
11	22	(France) Henri Pescarolo	March-Ford	77	+ 2 Laps	18	
12	21	(Germany) Rolf Stommelen	Surtees-Ford	77	+ 2 Laps	15	
13	8	(Italy) Andrea de Adamich	March-Alfa Romeo	75	+ 4 Laps	22	
Ret	2	(Brazil) Emerson Fittipaldi	Lotus-Ford	58	Engine	5	
Ret	20	(United Kingdom) John Surtees	Surtees-Ford	56	Gearbox	6	
Ret	10	(France) François Cevert	Tyrrell-Ford	45	Accident	9	
Ret	27	(New Zealand) Howden Ganley	BRM	42	Physical	24	
Ret	16	(Mexico) Pedro Rodríguez	BRM	33	Overheating	10	
Ret	15	(South Africa) Dave Charlton	Brabham-Ford	31	Engine	16	
Ret	17	(Switzerland) Jo Siffert	BRM	31	Overheating	12	
Ret	24	(Rhodesia) John Love	March-Ford	30	Differential	21	
Ret	25	(South Africa) Jackie Pretorius	Brabham-Ford	22	Engine	20	
Ret	12	(United Kingdom) Peter Gethin	McLaren-Ford	7	Fuel Leak	11	
Ret	23	(Sweden) Jo Bonnier	McLaren-Ford	5	Suspension	23	
Ret	26	(Spain) Alex Soler-Roig	March-Ford	5	Engine	25	

== Notes ==
- This was the Formula One World Championship debut for New Zealand driver Howden Ganley.
- This race marked the 200th podium finish for a British driver.
- This race saw the first podium finish for British constructor Tyrrell.

== Championship standings after the race ==
Drivers' Championship standings

Pos	Driver	Points
1	(United States) Mario Andretti	9
2	(United Kingdom) Jackie Stewart	6
3	(Switzerland) Clay Regazzoni	4
4	(Sweden) Reine Wisell	3
5	(New Zealand) Chris Amon	2

Constructors' Championship standings

Pos	Constructor	Points
1	(Italy) Ferrari	9
2	(United Kingdom) Tyrrell-Ford	6
3	(United Kingdom) Lotus-Ford	3
4	(France) Matra	2
5	(United Kingdom) McLaren-Ford	1

- Note: Only the top five positions are included for both sets of standings.

Previous race: 1970 Mexican Grand Prix	FIA Formula One World Championship; 1971 season	Next race: 1971 Spanish Grand Prix
Previous race: 1970 South African Grand Prix	South African Grand Prix	Next race: 1972 South African Grand Prix
