= 1971 United States Grand Prix =

Race details
- Date: October 3, 1971
- Official name: XIV United States Grand Prix
- Location: Watkins Glen Grand Prix Race Course; Watkins Glen, New York
- Course: Permanent road course
- Course length: 5.435 km (3.377 miles)
- Distance: 59 laps, 320.67 km (199.24 miles)
- Weather: Dry

Pole position
Driver	(United Kingdom) Jackie Stewart	Tyrrell-Ford
- Time: 1:42.642

Fastest lap
Driver	(Belgium) Jacky Ickx	Ferrari
- Time: 1:43.474 on lap 43

Podium
First	(France) François Cevert	Tyrrell-Ford
Second	(Switzerland) Jo Siffert	BRM
Third	(Sweden) Ronnie Peterson	March-Ford

The 1971 United States Grand Prix was a Formula One motor race held on October 3, 1971, at the Watkins Glen Grand Prix Race Course in Watkins Glen, New York. It was race 11 of 11 in both the 1971 World Championship of Drivers and the 1971 International Cup for Formula One Manufacturers. The 59-lap race was won by Tyrrell driver François Cevert after he started from fifth position. Jo Siffert finished second for the BRM team and March driver Ronnie Peterson came in third.

== Summary ==
Jackie Stewart's domination in 1971 clinched his second Driver's Championship with three races remaining, but the final round belonged to his Tyrrell teammate, François Cevert. The Frenchman took the lead from Stewart on lap 14 and went on to claim his only career win, the first GP victory for a French driver since Maurice Trintignant in 1958.

As usual, the American race attracted a large field of entrants, despite it being the last race of the year and both Championships having long been wrapped up. It seemed nearly every spare works F1 car and quite a few independents, as well, were present to try for a share of the $267,000 in prize money, easily the richest purse in F1. Unfortunately, the two most popular American drivers, Mario Andretti and Mark Donohue, who was fresh from a stunning third-place finish in Canada in his Formula One debut in a Penske-White Racing entered McLaren were committed to drive on Sunday in a USAC race which had been rescheduled to the GP weekend after it had been called off on the previous weekend because of extremely heavy rain. The two drivers qualified, Andretti in a Ferrari and Donohue in a Penske-White Racing entered McLaren shared with David Hobbs, hoping for more rain in New Jersey and the chance to return for the race on Sunday.

Since the previous year's race, the course had been resurfaced, widened and, most significantly, lengthened by a mile to 3.377 miles with an entirely new section at the southwest corner called the "Boot" or "Anvil". The pits were also moved from the north end straight back before the right angle turn known as "The 90," which now became Turn One.

Friday was sunny and hot (105 °F (41 °C)), and Stewart jumped immediately to the top of the charts with a time of 1:42.844, as the times were recorded to a thousandth of a second for the first time. On Saturday, with the temperature now 110° and both Goodyear's and Firestone's qualifying tires breaking down after a few laps, Emerson Fittipaldi pipped Stewart's time from the day before, but the Scot returned to the track and grabbed the pole by .017 of a second. Denny Hulme joined them on the front row in his McLaren, followed by Clay Regazzoni's Ferrari, Cevert and the soon-to-be-absent Andretti. American Peter Revson qualified nineteenth in the third Tyrrell. It was his only race for Tyrrell and his first Grand Prix since 1964.

=== Race ===
Sunday was dry in both upstate New York and Trenton, New Jersey, and word came that the USAC race would go on meaning that both Andretti and Donohue would be unable to start the race with Hobbs substituting for Donohue in the Penske-White Racing entered McLaren dismaying both the crowd and the organizers, who were robbed of seeing two of the country's best road racers. At the start, Denny Hulme jumped into the lead, ahead of Cevert and Stewart, but by the end of the first lap, Stewart led Hulme, Cevert, Regazzoni, Jo Siffert, Jacky Ickx, Chris Amon and Fittipaldi.

At first, Stewart was able to open a gap back to the following group, now headed by his teammate, but after ten laps, his tires began to go off and the gap closed. The Scot realized that Cevert's Goodyears were holding up much better in the heat, and when Cevert closed up right behind him, he waved him by on lap 14. Hulme was now struggling with a terrible vibration in his tires and was passed, first by Ickx, then Regazzoni and Siffert. On lap 15, American Sam Posey, in his first Grand Prix, retired from a fine run with a blown piston in his Surtees. By the time Ickx could get around Stewart on lap 17, Cevert's lead was 5.7 seconds.

At about half-distance, Cevert finally began to struggle with the same understeer that had plagued Stewart much earlier. Ickx was closing, and his Firestones were getting better as the race went on. On lap 43, the Belgian set the fastest lap of the race, and the gap was down to 2.2 seconds. Then, on lap 49, the Ferrari's alternator fell off, punching a hole in the gearbox and spilling oil all over the track! Hulme hit the oil and spun into the barrier, bending his front suspension. He was standing beside the track when Cevert came by and also hit the barrier, but kept going, now 29 seconds in the lead!

Jo Siffert was now in second place and 33 seconds clear of Ronnie Peterson. With four laps to go, however, Siffert began to run low on fuel. The Swede took huge chunks off the gap as Siffert jerked the BRM from side to side, trying to use every remaining drop of fuel. Cevert coasted home, taking both hands off the wheel to wave as he crossed the line, and Siffert weaved his way around to hold second place by four seconds over Peterson's March.

After taking the checkered flag, Cevert gave a nod to his teammate. "I feel pretty good with a $50,000 win. I followed Stewart in the beginning and was flagged on ahead. Jackie Stewart is a very sensible driver and a very good teacher. He let me go through." While it was the first race on the expanded Watkins Glen track, it was the third year in a row that The Glen had rewarded a driver with his first career victory. This was Cevert's only victory in Formula One.

== Qualifying ==
=== Qualifying classification ===
Pos.	No.	Driver	Constructor	Time	Grid
1	8	(United Kingdom) Jackie Stewart	Tyrrell-Ford	1:42.642	1
2	2	(Brazil) Emerson Fittipaldi	Lotus-Ford	1:42.659	2
3	7	(New Zealand) Denny Hulme	McLaren-Ford	1:42.925	3
4	5	(Switzerland) Clay Regazzoni	Ferrari	1:43.002	4
5	9	(France) François Cevert	Tyrrell-Ford	1:43.152	5
6	6	(United States) Mario Andretti	Ferrari	1:43.195	DNS
7	14	(Switzerland) Jo Siffert	BRM	1:43.468	6
8	32	(Belgium) Jacky Ickx	Ferrari	1:43.843	7
9	11	(New Zealand) Chris Amon	Matra	1:43.970	8
10	3	(Sweden) Reine Wisell	Lotus-Ford	1:44.024	9
11	12	(France) Jean-Pierre Beltoise	Matra	1:44.067	10
12	25	(Sweden) Ronnie Peterson	March-Ford	1:44.193	11
13	16	(New Zealand) Howden Ganley	BRM	1:44.430	12
14	18	(United Kingdom) John Surtees	Surtees-Ford	1:44.908	13
15	20	(United Kingdom) Mike Hailwood	Surtees-Ford	1:45.094	14
16	23	(Australia) Tim Schenken	Brabham-Ford	1:45.110	15
17	17	(Austria) Helmut Marko	BRM	1:45.204	16
18	19	(United States) Sam Posey	Surtees-Ford	1:45.267	17
19	31	(United States) Mark Donohue	McLaren-Ford	1:45.378	DNS
20	22	(United Kingdom) Graham Hill	Brabham-Ford	1:45.448	18
21	10	(United States) Peter Revson	Tyrrell-Ford	1:45.515	19
22	21	(France) Henri Pescarolo	March-Ford	1:45.568	20
23	15	(United Kingdom) Peter Gethin	BRM	1:45.729	21
24	31	(United Kingdom) David Hobbs	McLaren-Ford	1:46.270	22
25	26	(Italy) Nanni Galli	March-Ford	1:46.608	23
26	28	(Canada) John Cannon	BRM	1:47.471	24
27	33	(United States) Skip Barber	March-Ford	1:47.673	25
28	27	(Italy) Andrea de Adamich	March-Alfa Romeo	1:47.952	26
29	19	(Netherlands) Gijs van Lennep	Surtees-Ford	1:48.029	DNS
30	24	(United Kingdom) Chris Craft	Brabham-Ford	1:48.698	27
31	29	(Sweden) Jo Bonnier	McLaren-Ford	1:49.391	28
32	30	(United States) Pete Lovely	Lotus-Ford	1:52.140	29

== Race ==
=== Classification ===
Pos	No	Driver	Constructor	Laps	Time/Retired	Grid	Points
1	9	(France) François Cevert	Tyrrell-Ford	59	1:43:51.991	5	9
2	14	(Switzerland) Jo Siffert	BRM	59	+ 40.062	6	6
3	25	(Sweden) Ronnie Peterson	March-Ford	59	+ 44.070	11	4
4	16	(New Zealand) Howden Ganley	BRM	59	+ 56.749	12	3
5	8	(United Kingdom) Jackie Stewart	Tyrrell-Ford	59	+ 1:00.003	1	2
6	5	(Switzerland) Clay Regazzoni	Ferrari	59	+ 1:16.426	4	1
7	22	(United Kingdom) Graham Hill	Brabham-Ford	58	+ 1 lap	18	
8	12	(France) Jean-Pierre Beltoise	Matra	58	+ 1 lap	10	
9	15	(United Kingdom) Peter Gethin	BRM	58	+ 1 lap	21	
10	31	(United Kingdom) David Hobbs	McLaren-Ford	58	+ 1 lap	22	
11	27	(Italy) Andrea de Adamich	March-Alfa Romeo	57	+ 2 laps	26	
12	11	(New Zealand) Chris Amon	Matra	57	+ 2 laps	8	
13	17	(Austria) Helmut Marko	BRM	57	+ 2 laps	16	
14	28	(Canada) John Cannon	BRM	56	+ 3 laps	24	
15	20	(United Kingdom) Mike Hailwood	Surtees-Ford	54	Accident	14	
16	29	(Sweden) Jo Bonnier	McLaren-Ford	54	Out of fuel	28	
17	18	(United Kingdom) John Surtees	Surtees-Ford	54	+ 5 laps	13	
NC	33	(United States) Skip Barber	March-Ford	52	+ 7 laps	25	
NC	2	(Brazil) Emerson Fittipaldi	Lotus-Ford	49	+ 10 laps	2	
NC	30	(United States) Pete Lovely	Lotus-Ford	49	+ 10 laps	29	
Ret	32	(Belgium) Jacky Ickx	Ferrari	49	Alternator	7	
Ret	7	(New Zealand) Denny Hulme	McLaren-Ford	47	Accident	3	
Ret	23	(Australia) Tim Schenken	Brabham-Ford	41	Engine	15	
Ret	24	(United Kingdom) Chris Craft	Brabham-Ford	30	Suspension	27	
Ret	19	(United States) Sam Posey	Surtees-Ford	15	Piston	17	
Ret	21	(France) Henri Pescarolo	March-Ford	23	Engine	20	
Ret	26	(Italy) Nanni Galli	March-Ford	11	Wheel	23	
Ret	3	(Sweden) Reine Wisell	Lotus-Ford	5	Brakes	9	
Ret	10	(United States) Peter Revson	Tyrrell-Ford	1	Clutch	19	
DNS	6	(United States) Mario Andretti	Ferrari		Non-starter		
DNS	19	(Netherlands) Gijs van Lennep	Surtees-Ford		Driven by Posey		
DNS	31	(United States) Mark Donohue	McLaren-Ford		Driven by Hobbs		

== Notes ==
- This was the Formula One World Championship debut for American driver Sam Posey and Canadian driver John Cannon.
- This was the final Grand Prix for former GP winner Joakim Bonnier.
- This was the 100th Grand Prix start for Brabham.
- This was the 5th win of a United States Grand Prix by a Ford-powered car. It broke the old record set by Coventry Climax at the 1962 United States Grand Prix.

== Final Championship standings ==
Drivers' Championship standings

	Pos	Driver	Points
	1	(United Kingdom) **Jackie Stewart**	62
	2	(Sweden) Ronnie Peterson	33
1	3	(France) François Cevert	26
1	4	(Belgium) Jacky Ickx	19
1	5	(Switzerland) Jo Siffert	19

Constructors' Championship standings

	Pos	Constructor	Points
	1	(United Kingdom) **Tyrrell-Ford**	73
1	2	(United Kingdom) BRM	36
1	3	(Italy) Ferrari	33
	4	(United Kingdom) March-Ford	33 (34)
	5	(United Kingdom) Lotus-Ford	21

- Note: Only the top five positions are included for both sets of standings. Only the best 5 results from the first 6 rounds and the best 4 results from the last 5 rounds counted towards the Championship. Numbers without parentheses are Championship points; numbers in parentheses are total points scored.
- Bold text indicates the 1971 World Champions.

Previous race: 1971 Canadian Grand Prix	FIA Formula One World Championship; 1971 season	Next race: 1972 Argentine Grand Prix
Previous race: 1970 United States Grand Prix	United States Grand Prix	Next race: 1972 United States Grand Prix
