= 1970 United States Grand Prix =

Race details
- Date: October 4, 1970
- Official name: XIII United States Grand Prix
- Location: Watkins Glen Grand Prix Race Course; Watkins Glen, New York
- Course: Permanent road course
- Course length: 3.78 km (2.35 miles)
- Distance: 108 laps, 408.2 km (253.8 miles)
- Weather: Cloudy and dry with temperatures reaching up to 10 °C (50 °F); Wind speeds up to 29.5 km/h (18.3 mph)

Pole position
Driver	(Belgium) Jacky Ickx	Ferrari
- Time: 1:03.07

Fastest lap
Driver	(Belgium) Jacky Ickx	Ferrari
- Time: 1:02.74 on lap 105

Podium
First	(Brazil) Emerson Fittipaldi	Lotus-Ford
Second	(Mexico) Pedro Rodríguez	BRM
Third	(Sweden) Reine Wisell	Lotus-Ford

The 1970 United States Grand Prix was a Formula One motor race held on October 4, 1970 at the Watkins Glen Grand Prix Race Course in Watkins Glen, New York. It was race 12 of 13 in both the 1970 World Championship of Drivers and the 1970 International Cup for Formula One Manufacturers.

The 108-lap race was won by Emerson Fittipaldi, driving a Lotus-Ford, after he started from third position. Fittipaldi achieved his first Formula One victory, and the first for a Brazilian driver, in only his fourth Grand Prix start. Mexican driver Pedro Rodríguez finished second in a BRM, having led before a late pit stop for fuel, while Fittipaldi's Swedish team-mate Reine Wisell, making his F1 debut, finished third, which would turn out to be his only podium finish.

Belgian driver Jacky Ickx finished fourth in his Ferrari, having started from pole position before pitting to repair a broken fuel line. This result meant that Jochen Rindt became the first and, to date, only posthumous Formula One World Champion.

This would be the final Grand Prix for the circuit in this original fast configuration. 1971 would see a new longer layout presenting more of a challenge.

== Qualifying report ==
The Ferrari of Jacky Ickx was fastest in the initial practice session on Friday with a time of 1:03.07, but expectations were high for the Tyrrell 001 of Jackie Stewart, which had led the first 31 laps in its first outing in the previous race in Canada until axle failure ended its charge. The final session on Saturday was marred by a downpour that left only fifteen minutes of dry track time, and it was not enough for Stewart to knock Ickx off the pole. Emerson Fittipaldi, who spent the first half of the season in European Formula Two, was just five hundredths behind Stewart in third.

== Qualifying classification ==
Pos	No	Driver	Constructor	Time	Gap	Grid
1	3	(Belgium) Jacky Ickx	Ferrari	1:03.07	—	1
2	1	(United Kingdom) Jackie Stewart	Tyrrell-Ford	1:03.62	+0.55	2
3	24	(Brazil) Emerson Fittipaldi	Lotus-Ford	1:03.67	+0.60	3
4	19	(Mexico) Pedro Rodríguez	BRM	1:04.18	+1.11	4
5	12	(New Zealand) Chris Amon	March-Ford	1:04.23	+1.16	5
6	4	(Switzerland) Clay Regazzoni	Ferrari	1:04.30	+1.23	6
7	20	(United Kingdom) Jackie Oliver	BRM	1:04.37	+1.30	7
8	17	(United Kingdom) John Surtees	Surtees-Ford	1:04.52	+1.45	8
9	23	(Sweden) Reine Wisell	Lotus-Ford	1:04.79	+1.72	9
10	14	(United Kingdom) Graham Hill	Lotus-Ford	1:04.81	+1.74	10
11	8	(New Zealand) Denny Hulme	McLaren-Ford	1:04.84	+1.77	11
12	7	(France) Henri Pescarolo	Matra	1:05.00	+1.93	12
13	18	(United Kingdom) Derek Bell	Surtees-Ford	1:05.00	+1.93	13
14	21	(Canada) George Eaton	BRM	1:05.14	+2.07	14
15	29	(Sweden) Ronnie Peterson	March-Ford	1:05.18	+2.11	15
16	15	(Australia) Jack Brabham	Brabham-Ford	1:05.29	+2.22	16
17	2	(France) François Cevert	March-Ford	1:05.30	+2.23	17
18	6	(France) Jean-Pierre Beltoise	Matra	1:05.44	+2.37	18
19	16	(Germany) Rolf Stommelen	Brabham-Ford	1:05.77	+2.70	19
20	30	(Australia) Tim Schenken	De Tomaso-Ford	1:06.08	+3.01	20
21	9	(United Kingdom) Peter Gethin	McLaren-Ford	1:06.12	+3.05	21
22	31	(United States) Gus Hutchison	Brabham-Ford	1:06.22	+3.15	22
23	11	(Switzerland) Jo Siffert	March-Ford	1:06.23	+3.16	23
24	27	(Sweden) Jo Bonnier	McLaren-Ford	1:06.46	+3.39	24
DNQ	32	(United Kingdom) Peter Westbury	BRM	1:07.20	+4.13	—
DNQ	28	(United States) Pete Lovely	Lotus-Ford	1:07.45	+4.38	—
DNQ	10	(Italy) Andrea de Adamich	McLaren-Alfa Romeo	1:12.24	+9.17	—

== Race report ==
On Sunday, with a crowd exceeding 100,000 for the second straight year, black clouds and a shower 20 minutes prior to the race caused a lot of excitement among the crews on the grid, as many teams changed to rain tires and back again. By the start, however, all but Clay Regazzoni and Derek Bell had reverted to slicks. Stewart took the lead off the grid, ahead of Pedro Rodríguez, as Fittipaldi dropped to eighth behind Ickx, Regazzoni, Chris Amon, John Surtees and Jackie Oliver.

By lap 17, the Ferraris of Ickx and Regazzoni had passed Rodríguez, but by that time, Stewart's lead was nearly twenty seconds. Graham Hill, in a privately entered Lotus 72, came into the pits on lap 30 with fuel leaking into the cockpit, as a fitting had come loose under the seat. The team took 10 minutes to fix the leak, threw some water on Hill, whose overalls were soaked in fuel, and sent him back out. Several laps later, Hill returned to request they find him some dry overalls, as the gasoline was burning his skin. When he stopped again to change clothes, the team said they had not been able to locate any new ones. Hill, however, saw John Surtees, who had retired on the seventh lap, sitting on the wall, and borrowed his overalls and undergarments. The two former World Champions were naked in the pits as Hill was doused with water before donning Surtees' clean clothes and returning to the track, only to retire on lap 72 with a broken clutch.

At half-distance, Stewart was nearly half a lap ahead of Ickx, with Rodríguez in third and Fittipaldi about to be lapped in fourth. Ickx suddenly pitted on lap 57 to repair a broken fuel line, and he rejoined in twelfth place. He fought his way back up to fourth, setting the race's fastest lap three laps from the finish. Ickx had needed to win to have a chance of overtaking Jochen Rindt in the Championship; his fourth-place finish would mean that Rindt would become the first posthumous Formula One World Champion.

On lap 76, with a one-minute cushion, Stewart's Tyrrell began trailing smoke from its left-hand exhaust pipe. The smoke slowly grew worse, and Rodríguez tore into Stewart's lead, taking off five seconds a lap, while the Lotus teammates unlapped themselves. On lap 83, with its oil gone, the Cosworth engine in the Tyrrell seized, leaving Rodríguez with an 18.8 second lead over Fittipaldi, who led team-mate Reine Wisell by another 46 seconds.

At the end of the 100th lap, Rodríguez coasted into the pit lane having run out of fuel. BRM refueled the car, but Rodríguez had lost 38 seconds to Fittipaldi, who took the lead. Rodríguez rejoined ahead of the second Lotus of Wisell.

Fittipaldi recalled later, "I took the lead and, going over the finish line, I saw for the first time Colin [Chapman] jumping and throwing his hat, something I'd seen him do for Jim Clark and Graham Hill and Jochen, and I kept saying to myself, 'He's doing that for me. I won the race. I won the US Grand Prix!' It was unbelievable."

His victory was the seventh American win for Lotus. It clinched the Drivers' Championship for the team's dead leader, Jochen Rindt, and the Constructors' Championship for Lotus and Colin Chapman.

This was the final Grand Prix to be held on the 2.35-mile (3.78 km) layout of the track, in use since 1956. Watkins Glen underwent extensive renovation over the course of 1971, including the lengthening of the track to 3.377 miles (5.435 km) in time for that year's Grand Prix, with an interim layout adopted for the Six Hours sports car race beforehand.

== Race classification ==
Pos	No	Driver	Constructor	Laps	Time/Retired	Grid	Points
1	24	(Brazil) Emerson Fittipaldi	Lotus-Ford	108	1:57:32.79	3	9
2	19	(Mexico) Pedro Rodríguez	BRM	108	+ 36.39	4	6
3	23	(Sweden) Reine Wisell	Lotus-Ford	108	+ 45.17	9	4
4	3	(Belgium) Jacky Ickx	Ferrari	107	+ 1 Lap	1	3
5	12	(New Zealand) Chris Amon	March-Ford	107	+ 1 Lap	5	2
6	18	(United Kingdom) Derek Bell	Surtees-Ford	107	+ 1 Lap	13	1
7	8	(New Zealand) Denny Hulme	McLaren-Ford	106	+ 2 Laps	11	
8	7	(France) Henri Pescarolo	Matra	105	+ 3 Laps	12	
9	11	(Switzerland) Jo Siffert	March-Ford	105	+ 3 Laps	23	
10	15	(Australia) Jack Brabham	Brabham-Ford	105	+ 3 Laps	16	
11	29	(Sweden) Ronnie Peterson	March-Ford	104	+ 4 Laps	15	
12	16	(West Germany) Rolf Stommelen	Brabham-Ford	104	+ 4 Laps	19	
13	4	(Switzerland) Clay Regazzoni	Ferrari	101	+ 7 Laps	6	
14	9	(United Kingdom) Peter Gethin	McLaren-Ford	100	+ 8 Laps	21	
Ret	1	(United Kingdom) Jackie Stewart	Tyrrell-Ford	82	Oil Leak	2	
Ret	14	(United Kingdom) Graham Hill	Lotus-Ford	72	Clutch	10	
Ret	2	(France) François Cevert	March-Ford	62	Wheel	17	
Ret	30	(Australia) Tim Schenken	De Tomaso-Ford	61	Suspension	20	
Ret	27	(Sweden) Jo Bonnier	McLaren-Ford	50	Water Pipe	24	
Ret	6	(France) Jean-Pierre Beltoise	Matra	27	Handling	18	
Ret	31	(United States) Gus Hutchison	Brabham-Ford	21	Fuel Leak	22	
Ret	20	(United Kingdom) Jackie Oliver	BRM	14	Engine	7	
Ret	21	(Canada) George Eaton	BRM	10	Engine	14	
Ret	17	(United Kingdom) John Surtees	Surtees-Ford	6	Engine	8	
DNQ	32	(United Kingdom) Peter Westbury	BRM				
DNQ	28	(United States) Pete Lovely	Lotus-Ford				
DNQ	10	(Italy) Andrea de Adamich	McLaren-Alfa Romeo				

== Notes ==
- This was the Formula One World Championship debut for Swedish driver Reine Wisell and for American driver Gus Hutchison.
- This was the first Grand Prix win and podium finish for future World Champion Emerson Fittipaldi and for a Brazilian driver.

== Championship standings after the race ==
Drivers' Championship standings

Pos	Driver	Points
1	(Austria) **Jochen Rindt**	45
2	(Belgium) Jacky Ickx	31
3	(Switzerland) Clay Regazzoni	27
4	(United Kingdom) Jackie Stewart	25
5	(Australia) Jack Brabham	25

Constructors' Championship standings

Pos	Constructor	Points
1	(United Kingdom) **Lotus-Ford**	59
2	(Italy) Ferrari	46
3	(United Kingdom) March-Ford	45
4	(United Kingdom) Brabham-Ford	35
5	(United Kingdom) McLaren-Ford	31

- Note: Only the top five positions are included for both sets of standings.
- Note: Bold indicates that the driver/constructor has won the respective title.

Previous race: 1970 Canadian Grand Prix	FIA Formula One World Championship; 1970 season	Next race: 1970 Mexican Grand Prix
Previous race: 1969 United States Grand Prix	United States Grand Prix	Next race: 1971 United States Grand Prix
