= 1970 Monaco Grand Prix =

Coordinates: 43°44′4.74″N 7°25′16.8″E

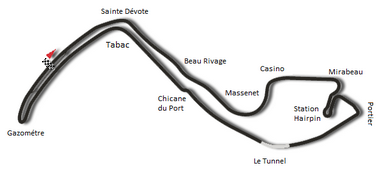

Race details
- Date: 10 May 1970
- Official name: XXVIII Grand Prix de Monaco
- Location: Circuit de Monaco, Monte Carlo, Monaco
- Course: Street circuit
- Course length: 3.145 km (1.954 miles)
- Distance: 80 laps, 251.600 km (156.337 miles)
- Weather: Sunny and warm

Pole position
Driver	(United Kingdom) Jackie Stewart	March-Ford
- Time: 1:24.0

Fastest lap
Driver	(Austria) Jochen Rindt	Lotus-Ford
- Time: 1:23.2 on lap 80

Podium
First	(Austria) Jochen Rindt	Lotus-Ford
Second	(Australia) Jack Brabham	Brabham-Ford
Third	(France) Henri Pescarolo	Matra

The 1970 Monaco Grand Prix was a Formula One motor race held at the Circuit de Monaco on 10 May 1970. It was race 3 of 13 in both the 1970 World Championship of Drivers and the 1970 International Cup for Formula One Manufacturers. Jochen Rindt scored the last victory for the famous Lotus 49.

This was Bruce McLaren's final Formula One race - as he was killed 5 days before the next race at Belgium - and Ronnie Peterson's first.

== Report ==
There were no significant changes in the drivers' lineup for Monaco, and the only new driver was Ronnie Peterson, entering in a non-works March. The Lotus team decided to bring the old 49C chassis instead of the new 72, despite testing the new car in a non-championship race at Silverstone a couple of weeks earlier. In qualifying March swept the front row, with Jackie Stewart on pole (for the Tyrrell team) and Chris Amon alongside him. Third was Denny Hulme's McLaren, and fourth the Brabham of Jack Brabham; behind them was the Ferrari of Jacky Ickx. The first Lotus driver was Jochen Rindt, qualifying in eighth place.

Despite heavy rain during the practice laps, the drivers raced in clear conditions and on a dry track. Stewart led the field with Amon, Brabham, Ickx and Jean-Pierre Beltoise behind him; Hulme got a poor start and was way down the order after the first corner. On the second lap, Beltoise passed Ickx, who retired on lap 12 with a driveshaft failure. On lap 22 Beltoise, now in fourth, retired with transmission problems; on the same lap Brabham passed Amon to take second place. Stewart remained the race leader until his car began misfiring on lap 27. After a long pit stop, Stewart returned to the race only to eventually retire. This left Brabham in the lead, with Amon, Hulme and Rindt following. The engine failed on Jackie Oliver's BRM, who retired due to quickly falling oil pressure. At around the same time, Hulme developed problems with the gearing of his McLaren and so dropped back behind Rindt and Henri Pescarolo.

On lap 62 Amon's suspension failed; he was forced to retire, leaving Rindt in second place nine seconds behind Brabham. Rindt increased his pace, able to close the gap to Brabham. On the final corner of the last lap, however, Brabham defended the inside line to prevent Rindt from passing. There was less traction on the dusty surface off the racing line, and Brabham locked the wheels under braking and the car skidded across the track towards the barriers. Rindt passed behind him and won the race. Brabham quickly reversed and finished the race in second position. Third was Pescarolo in a Matra, while the remaining points positions were rounded out by Hulme, Graham Hill (who worked his way up from the last spot on the grid) and Pedro Rodríguez.

== Qualifying ==
=== Qualifying classification ===
Pos.	Driver	Constructor	Time	Grid
1	(United Kingdom) Jackie Stewart	March-Ford	1:24.0	1
2	(New Zealand) Chris Amon	March-Ford	1:24.6	2
3	(New Zealand) Denny Hulme	McLaren-Ford	1:25.1	3
4	(Australia) Jack Brabham	Brabham-Ford	1:25.4	4
5	(Belgium) Jacky Ickx	Ferrari	1:25.5	5
6	(France) Jean-Pierre Beltoise	Matra	1:25.6	6
7	(France) Henri Pescarolo	Matra	1:25.7	7
8	(Austria) Jochen Rindt	Lotus-Ford	1:25.9	8
9	(United Kingdom) Piers Courage	De Tomaso-Ford	1:26.1	9
10	(New Zealand) Bruce McLaren	McLaren-Ford	1:26.1	10
11	(Switzerland) Jo Siffert	March-Ford	1:26.2	11
DNQ	(Germany) Rolf Stommelen	Brabham-Ford	1:26.3	—
DNQ	(Italy) Andrea de Adamich	McLaren-Alfa Romeo	1:26.3	—
14	(United Kingdom) Graham Hill	Lotus-Ford	1:26.8	16
15	(Sweden) Ronnie Peterson	March-Ford	1:26.8	12
DNQ	(Canada) George Eaton	BRM	1:27.0	—
17	(United Kingdom) John Surtees	McLaren-Ford	1:27.4	13
DNQ	(United Kingdom) John Miles	Lotus-Ford	1:27.4	—
19	(United Kingdom) Jackie Oliver	BRM	1:27.5	14
DNQ	(France) Johnny Servoz-Gavin	March-Ford	1:28.1	—
21	(Mexico) Pedro Rodríguez	BRM	1:28.8	15

== Race ==
=== Classification ===
Pos	No	Driver	Constructor	Laps	Time/Retired	Grid	Points
1	3	(Austria) Jochen Rindt	Lotus-Ford	80	1:54:37.4	8	9
2	5	(Australia) Jack Brabham	Brabham-Ford	80	+ 23.1	4	6
3	9	(France) Henri Pescarolo	Matra	80	+ 51.4	7	4
4	11	(New Zealand) Denny Hulme	McLaren-Ford	80	+ 1:28.3	3	3
5	1	(United Kingdom) Graham Hill	Lotus-Ford	79	+ 1 Lap	16	2
6	17	(Mexico) Pedro Rodríguez	BRM	78	+ 2 Laps	15	1
7	23	(Sweden) Ronnie Peterson	March-Ford	78	+ 2 Laps	12	
8	19	(Switzerland) Jo Siffert	March-Ford	76	Out of Fuel	11	
Ret	28	(New Zealand) Chris Amon	March-Ford	60	Suspension	2	
NC	24	(United Kingdom) Piers Courage	De Tomaso-Ford	58	+ 22 Laps	9	
Ret	21	(United Kingdom) Jackie Stewart	March-Ford	57	Engine	1	
Ret	16	(United Kingdom) Jackie Oliver	BRM	42	Engine	14	
Ret	8	(France) Jean-Pierre Beltoise	Matra	21	Differential	6	
Ret	12	(New Zealand) Bruce McLaren	McLaren-Ford	19	Suspension	10	
Ret	14	(United Kingdom) John Surtees	McLaren-Ford	14	Oil Pressure	13	
Ret	26	(Belgium) Jacky Ickx	Ferrari	11	Halfshaft	5	
DNQ	10	(Italy) Andrea de Adamich	McLaren-Alfa Romeo				
DNQ	6	(Germany) Rolf Stommelen	Brabham-Ford				
DNQ	15	(Canada) George Eaton	BRM				
DNQ	2	(United Kingdom) John Miles	Lotus-Ford				
DNQ	20	(France) Johnny Servoz-Gavin	March-Ford				

== Notes ==
- This was the Formula One World Championship debut for Swedish driver and future Grand Prix winner Ronnie Peterson.
- This was the 5th win of a Monaco Grand Prix by Lotus. It broke the old record set by BRM at the 1966 Monaco Grand Prix.

== Championship standings after the race ==
Drivers' Championship standings

	Pos	Driver	Points
1	1	(Australia) Jack Brabham	15
1	2	(United Kingdom) Jackie Stewart	13
13	3	(Austria) Jochen Rindt	9
1	4	(New Zealand) Denny Hulme	9
1	5	(New Zealand) Bruce McLaren	6

Constructors' Championship standings

	Pos	Constructor	Points
2	1	(United Kingdom) Brabham-Ford	15
	2	(United Kingdom) McLaren-Ford	15
1	3	(United Kingdom) Lotus-Ford	14
3	4	(United Kingdom) March-Ford	13
	5	(France) Matra	7

- Note: Only the top five positions are included for both sets of standings.

Previous race: 1970 Spanish Grand Prix	FIA Formula One World Championship; 1970 season	Next race: 1970 Belgian Grand Prix
Previous race: 1969 Monaco Grand Prix	Monaco Grand Prix	Next race: 1971 Monaco Grand Prix
