= 1969 Spanish Grand Prix =

- The Montjuïc Circuit (1966–1975)

Race details
- Date: 4 May 1969
- Official name: XV Gran Premio de España
- Location: Montjuïc Circuit, Montjuïc, Barcelona, Catalonia, Spain
- Course: Street Circuit
- Course length: 3.791 km (2.356 miles)
- Distance: 90 laps, 341.190 km (212.006 miles)
- Weather: Sunny, mild, dry

Pole position
Driver	(Austria) Jochen Rindt	Lotus-Ford
- Time: 1:25.7

Fastest lap
Driver	(Austria) Jochen Rindt	Lotus-Ford
- Time: 1:28.3 on lap 15

Podium
First	(United Kingdom) Jackie Stewart	Matra-Ford
Second	(New Zealand) Bruce McLaren	McLaren-Ford
Third	(France) Jean-Pierre Beltoise	Matra-Ford

The 1969 Spanish Grand Prix was a Formula One motor race held at the Montjuïc Circuit on 4 May 1969. It was race 2 of 11 in both the 1969 World Championship of Drivers and the 1969 International Cup for Formula One Manufacturers.

There was a small field for this race, as the famous Targa Florio sportscar race was on the same day. This is one of only two Grands Prix where the winner finished two laps ahead of the runner-up, the other occasion being the 1995 Australian Grand Prix. This was the last race of the high wing era in Formula One. Both works Lotus cars suffered massive accidents when their suspension-mounted wing supports failed. Despite the narrow confines of the Montjuïc circuit, drivers Jochen Rindt and Graham Hill both survived, Hill was injured but Rindt broke his nose and a marshall lost an eye. Dave Sims said in 2010 "We had the big wing in Barcelona and Chapman said I want to make it wider with aluminium and styrofoam and we put six inches either side and put so much downforce on it bent during the race". Chris Amon inherited the lead after Rindt's crash. Establishing a thirty-second lead, the New Zealander seemed to be on his way to his first Grand Prix victory until his engine seized on lap 56. The lead was then gifted to Jackie Stewart, who then went on to win by a margin of two laps; one of his most dominant performances, on a circuit that would become synonymous with the danger and lack of professionalism he detested.

== Classification ==
=== Qualifying ===
Pos	No	Driver	Constructor	Time	Gap
1	2	(Austria) Jochen Rindt	Lotus-Ford	1:25.7	—
2	15	(New Zealand) Chris Amon	Ferrari	1:26.2	+0.5
3	1	(United Kingdom) Graham Hill	Lotus-Ford	1:26.6	+0.9
4	7	(United Kingdom) Jackie Stewart	Matra-Ford	1:26.9	+1.2
5	3	(Australia) Jack Brabham	Brabham-Ford	1:27.8	+2.1
6	10	(Switzerland) Jo Siffert	Lotus-Ford	1:28.2	+2.5
7	4	(Belgium) Jacky Ickx	Brabham-Ford	1:28.4	+2.7
8	5	(New Zealand) Denny Hulme	McLaren-Ford	1:28.6	+2.9
9	14	(United Kingdom) John Surtees	BRM	1:28.9	+3.2
10	12	(United Kingdom) Jackie Oliver	BRM	1:29.2	+3.5
11	11	(United Kingdom) Piers Courage	Brabham-Ford	1:29.3	+3.6
12	8	(France) Jean-Pierre Beltoise	Matra-Ford	1:29.5	+3.8
13	6	(New Zealand) Bruce McLaren	McLaren-Ford	1:29.7	+4.0
14	9	(Mexico) Pedro Rodríguez	BRM	1:34.1	+8.4

=== Race ===
Pos	No	Driver	Constructor	Laps	Time/Retired	Grid	Points
1	7	(United Kingdom) Jackie Stewart	Matra-Ford	90	2:16:54.0	4	9
2	6	(New Zealand) Bruce McLaren	McLaren-Ford	88	+ 2 laps	13	6
3	8	(France) Jean-Pierre Beltoise	Matra-Ford	87	+ 3 laps	12	4
4	5	(New Zealand) Denny Hulme	McLaren-Ford	87	+ 3 laps	8	3
5	14	(United Kingdom) John Surtees	BRM	84	+ 6 laps	9	2
6	4	(Belgium) Jacky Ickx	Brabham-Ford	83	+ 7 laps	7	1
Ret	9	(Mexico) Pedro Rodríguez	BRM	73	Engine	14	
Ret	15	(New Zealand) Chris Amon	Ferrari	56	Engine	2	
Ret	3	(Australia) Jack Brabham	Brabham-Ford	51	Engine	5	
Ret	10	(Switzerland) Jo Siffert	Lotus-Ford	30	Oil leak	6	
Ret	2	(Austria) Jochen Rindt	Lotus-Ford	19	Accident	1	
Ret	11	(United Kingdom) Piers Courage	Brabham-Ford	18	Engine	11	
Ret	1	(United Kingdom) Graham Hill	Lotus-Ford	8	Accident	3	
Ret	12	(United Kingdom) Jackie Oliver	BRM	1	Oil pipe	10	

== Notes ==
- This race saw the fastest lap set by Jochen Rindt and by an Austrian driver, a first for both.
- This was the fifth Grand Prix win for French constructor Matra.
- A Ford-powered car had now won the Spanish Grand Prix twice, breaking the old record set by Alfa Romeo at the 1951 Spanish Grand Prix.

== Championship standings after the race ==
Drivers' Championship standings

	Pos	Driver	Points
	1	(United Kingdom) Jackie Stewart	18
3	2	(New Zealand) Bruce McLaren	8
	3	(New Zealand) Denny Hulme	7
2	4	(United Kingdom) Graham Hill	6
1	5	(France) Jean-Pierre Beltoise	5

Constructors' Championship standings

	Pos	Constructor	Points
	1	(France) Matra-Ford	18
1	2	(United Kingdom) McLaren-Ford	10
1	3	(United Kingdom) Lotus-Ford	6
	4	(United Kingdom) BRM	2
1	5	(United Kingdom) Brabham-Ford	1

- Note: Only the top five positions are included for both sets of standings.

Previous race: 1969 South African Grand Prix	FIA Formula One World Championship; 1969 season	Next race: 1969 Monaco Grand Prix
Previous race: 1968 Spanish Grand Prix	Spanish Grand Prix	Next race: 1970 Spanish Grand Prix
