= 1970 Canadian Grand Prix =

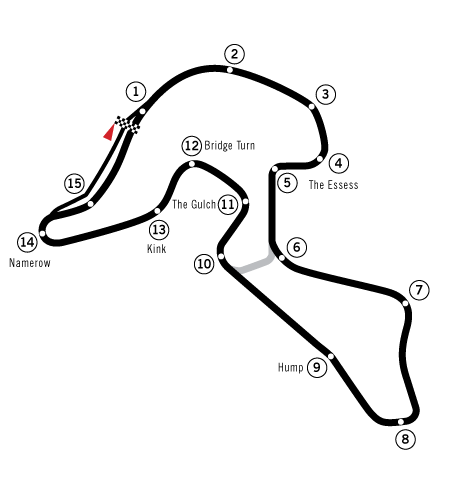

Race details
- Date: September 20, 1970
- Official name: X Player's Grand Prix Canada
- Location: Circuit Mont-Tremblant, Mont-Tremblant, Quebec, Canada
- Course: Permanent racing facility
- Course length: 4.265 km (2.650 miles)
- Distance: 90 laps, 383.850 km (238.501 miles)
- Weather: Mild with temperatures approaching 23.3 °C (73.9 °F); winds gusting up to 10.1 kilometres per hour (6.3 mph)

Pole position
Driver	(United Kingdom) Jackie Stewart	Tyrrell-Ford
- Time: 1:31.5

Fastest lap
Driver	(Switzerland) Clay Regazzoni	Ferrari
- Time: 1:32.2 on lap 75

Podium
First	(Belgium) Jacky Ickx	Ferrari
Second	(Switzerland) Clay Regazzoni	Ferrari
Third	(New Zealand) Chris Amon	March-Ford

The 1970 Canadian Grand Prix was a Formula One motor race held at Circuit Mont-Tremblant on September 20, 1970. It was race 11 of 13 in both the 1970 World Championship of Drivers and the 1970 International Cup for Formula One Manufacturers. The 90-lap race was won by Ferrari driver Jacky Ickx after he started from second position. His teammate Clay Regazzoni finished second and March driver Chris Amon came in third. This race marked the debut of Tyrrell Racing as a constructor. Stewart took pole position for the race in the first outing for the team. Tim Schenken finishing the race only 11 laps behind is the best a De Tomaso built car ever achieved. Also of note Team Lotus still mourning the loss of Jochen Rindt did not enter this race but the Rob Walker team running the Lotus 72 with Graham Hill did.

== Qualifying classification ==
Pos	No	Driver	Constructor	Time	Gap	Grid
1	3	(United Kingdom) Jackie Stewart	Tyrrell-Ford	1:31.5	—	1
2	18	(Belgium) Jacky Ickx	Ferrari	1:31.6	+0.1	2
3	19	(Switzerland) Clay Regazzoni	Ferrari	1:31.9	+0.4	3
4	2	(France) François Cevert	March-Ford	1:32.4	+0.9	4
5	4	(United Kingdom) John Surtees	Surtees-Ford	1:32.6	+1.1	5
6	20	(New Zealand) Chris Amon	March-Ford	1:32.6	+1.1	6
7	14	(Mexico) Pedro Rodríguez	BRM	1:32.7	+1.2	7
8	24	(France) Henri Pescarolo	Matra	1:32.9	+1.4	8
9	16	(Canada) George Eaton	BRM	1:32.9	+1.4	9
10	15	(United Kingdom) Jackie Oliver	BRM	1:33.1	+1.6	10
11	6	(United Kingdom) Peter Gethin	McLaren-Ford	1:33.2	+1.7	11
12	8	(Italy) Andrea de Adamich	McLaren-Alfa Romeo	1:33.2	+1.7	12
13	23	(France) Jean-Pierre Beltoise	Matra	1:33.4	+1.9	13
14	21	(Switzerland) Jo Siffert	March-Ford	1:33.5	+2.0	14
15	5	(New Zealand) Denny Hulme	McLaren-Ford	1:33.9	+2.4	15
16	26	(Sweden) Ronnie Peterson	March-Ford	1:34.4	+2.9	16
17	10	(Australia) Tim Schenken	De Tomaso-Ford	1:34.6	+3.1	17
18	12	(Germany) Rolf Stommelen	Brabham-Ford	1:34.7	+3.2	18
19	11	(Australia) Jack Brabham	Brabham-Ford	1:35.4	+3.9	19
20	9	(United Kingdom) Graham Hill	Lotus-Ford	1:35.8	+4.3	20

== Race classification ==
Pos	No	Driver	Constructor	Laps	Time/Retired	Grid	Points
1	18	(Belgium) Jacky Ickx	Ferrari	90	2:21:18.4	2	9
2	19	(Switzerland) Clay Regazzoni	Ferrari	90	+ 14.8	3	6
3	20	(New Zealand) Chris Amon	March-Ford	90	+ 57.9	6	4
4	14	(Mexico) Pedro Rodríguez	BRM	89	+ 1 lap	7	3
5	4	(United Kingdom) John Surtees	Surtees-Ford	89	+ 1 lap	5	2
6	6	(United Kingdom) Peter Gethin	McLaren-Ford	88	+ 2 laps	11	1
7	24	(France) Henri Pescarolo	Matra	87	+ 3 laps	8	
8	23	(France) Jean-Pierre Beltoise	Matra	85	Clutch	13	
9	2	(France) François Cevert	March-Ford	85	+ 5 laps	4	
10	16	(Canada) George Eaton	BRM	85	+ 5 laps	9	
NC	10	(Australia) Tim Schenken	De Tomaso-Ford	79	+ 11 laps	17	
NC	9	(United Kingdom) Graham Hill	Lotus-Ford	77	+ 13 laps	20	
Ret	8	(Italy) Andrea de Adamich	McLaren-Alfa Romeo	69	Oil Pressure	12	
NC	26	(Sweden) Ronnie Peterson	March-Ford	65	+ 25 laps	16	
Ret	5	(New Zealand) Denny Hulme	McLaren-Ford	58	Engine	15	
Ret	11	(Australia) Jack Brabham	Brabham-Ford	57	Oil Leak	19	
NC	15	(United Kingdom) Jackie Oliver	BRM	52	+ 38 laps	10	
Ret	3	(United Kingdom) Jackie Stewart	Tyrrell-Ford	31	Axle	1	
Ret	12	(Germany) Rolf Stommelen	Brabham-Ford	22	Handling	18	
Ret	21	(Switzerland) Jo Siffert	March-Ford	21	Engine	14	

== Notes ==
- This was the 100th race for a Belgian driver. In those 100 races, Belgian drivers had won 5 Grands Prix, achieved 18 podium finishes, 6 pole positions, 6 fastest laps and 2 Grand Slams.
- After winning last year's Canadian Grand Prix, Jacky Ickx now was the sole record holder with two Canadian Grand Prix wins, breaking the record set by Jack Brabham at the 1967 Canadian Grand Prix.
- This was the first pole position for British constructor Tyrrell.

== Championship standings after the race ==
Drivers' Championship standings

	Pos	Driver	Points
	1	(Austria) **Jochen Rindt***	45
4	2	(Belgium) **Jacky Ickx***	28
2	3	(Switzerland) Clay Regazzoni	27
2	4	(United Kingdom) Jackie Stewart	25
2	5	(Australia) Jack Brabham	25

Constructors' Championship standings

	Pos	Constructor	Points
	1	(United Kingdom) **Lotus-Ford***	50
2	2	(Italy) **Ferrari***	43
1	3	(United Kingdom) **March-Ford***	43
1	4	(United Kingdom) **Brabham-Ford***	35
	5	(United Kingdom) McLaren-Ford	31

- Note: Only the top five positions are included for both sets of standings.
- Competitors in bold and marked with an asterisk still had a theoretical chance of becoming World Champion.

Previous race: 1970 Italian Grand Prix	FIA Formula One World Championship; 1970 season	Next race: 1970 United States Grand Prix
Previous race: 1969 Canadian Grand Prix	Canadian Grand Prix	Next race: 1971 Canadian Grand Prix
