= Silvio Moser Racing Team =

Silvio Moser Racing Team SA
- Full name: (Switzerland) Silvio Moser Racing Team
- Founder(s): Silvio Moser
- Noted staff: Silvio Moser; Beat Schenker
- Noted drivers: (Switzerland) Silvio Moser

Formula One World Championship career
- First entry: 1966 German Grand Prix
- Races entered: 13
- Drivers' Championships: 0
- Race victories: 0
- Pole positions: 0
- Fastest laps: 0
- Final entry: 1970 Italian Grand Prix

Silvio Moser Racing Team SA was a motor racing team from Switzerland, founded by Silvio Moser. The team was headquartered in Lugano and entered cars in Formula One and sports car racing.

== Formula One ==
Silvio Moser debuted in Formula One at the 1966 German Grand Prix, a mixed Formula One and Formula Two motor race held at the Nürburgring Nordschleife. Moser drove a Brabham BT16 Formula Two car, and although he managed to qualify, he did not start the race. After having raced for Charles Vögele's team in 1967 and 1968, Moser revived the idea of having his own team in 1969. Backed by Aldo Sonvico and Aldo Pessina, the team purchased a BT24 with a Cosworth DFV. At the 1969 Monaco Grand Prix, Moser retired with drive shaft problems from the race on lap fifteen. At the Dutch Grand Prix Moser retired on lap 54 after his ignition failed. At the French Grand Prix, Moser finished in a good seventh position. In Italy he retired on lap 9 because a fuel supply problem. At the Canadian Grand Prix, he retired on lap one after an accident. At the 1969 United States Grand Prix Moser finished sixth position, earning the first points for the team. At the Mexican Grand Prix the last race of the season, Moser on the way to a 6th place before a fuel leak forced him to retire and was classified 11th.

For 1970 Moser elected to change approach and instead of using existing chassis he commissioned Guglielmo Bellasi to design a brand new Grand Prix car. According to Moser's chief mechanic, Beat Schenker, "[Bellasi] was full of ideas. He conceived a very original car but perhaps not one that reflected what we needed". The red car was named Bellasi after its designer. The car was not much of a success. The team made five attempts to qualify but only managed once on the occasion of the Austrian Grand Prix where Moser retired on lap 13 due to a failing radiator.

At the end of 1971 Moser sold the Bellasi to Tom Weatcroft. The car was later exhibited at the Donington Grand Prix Collection. With the money earned from the operation, Moser purchased two Brabham Cosworth BT42s: -5 and -6. In 1973 touring cars driver Martino Finotto bought the cars from Moser with the idea of racing them. Having realized that the power of these cars were above his racing skills, Finotto decided to find more able drivers for the cars to race them and asked Moser to race with the support of Jurg Bretscher, head of the Bretscher Racing Team. The team was renamed Scuderia Finotto.

== Complete Formula One World Championship results ==
(key) (Results in bold indicate pole position; results in italics indicate fastest lap.)

Year	Chassis	Engine(s)	Tyres	Drivers	1	2	3	4	5	6	7	8	9	10	11	12	13
1966	Brabham BT16	Ford Cosworth SCA 1.0 L4	D		MON	BEL	FRA	GBR	NED	GER	ITA	USA	MEX				
1966	Brabham BT16	Ford Cosworth SCA 1.0 L4	D	(Switzerland) Silvio Moser						DNS							
1969	Brabham BT24	Ford Cosworth DFV 3.0 V8	G		RSA	ESP	MON	NED	FRA	GBR	GER	ITA	CAN	USA	MEX		
1969	Brabham BT24	Ford Cosworth DFV 3.0 V8	G	(Switzerland) Silvio Moser			Ret	Ret	7			Ret	Ret	6	11		
1970	Bellasi F1 70	Ford Cosworth DFV 3.0 V8	G		RSA	ESP	MON	BEL	NED	FRA	GBR	GER	AUT	ITA	CAN	USA	MEX
1970	Bellasi F1 70	Ford Cosworth DFV 3.0 V8	G	(Switzerland) Silvio Moser					DNQ	DNQ		DNQ	Ret	DNQ			
