= Hubert Hahne =

German racing driver (1935–2019)

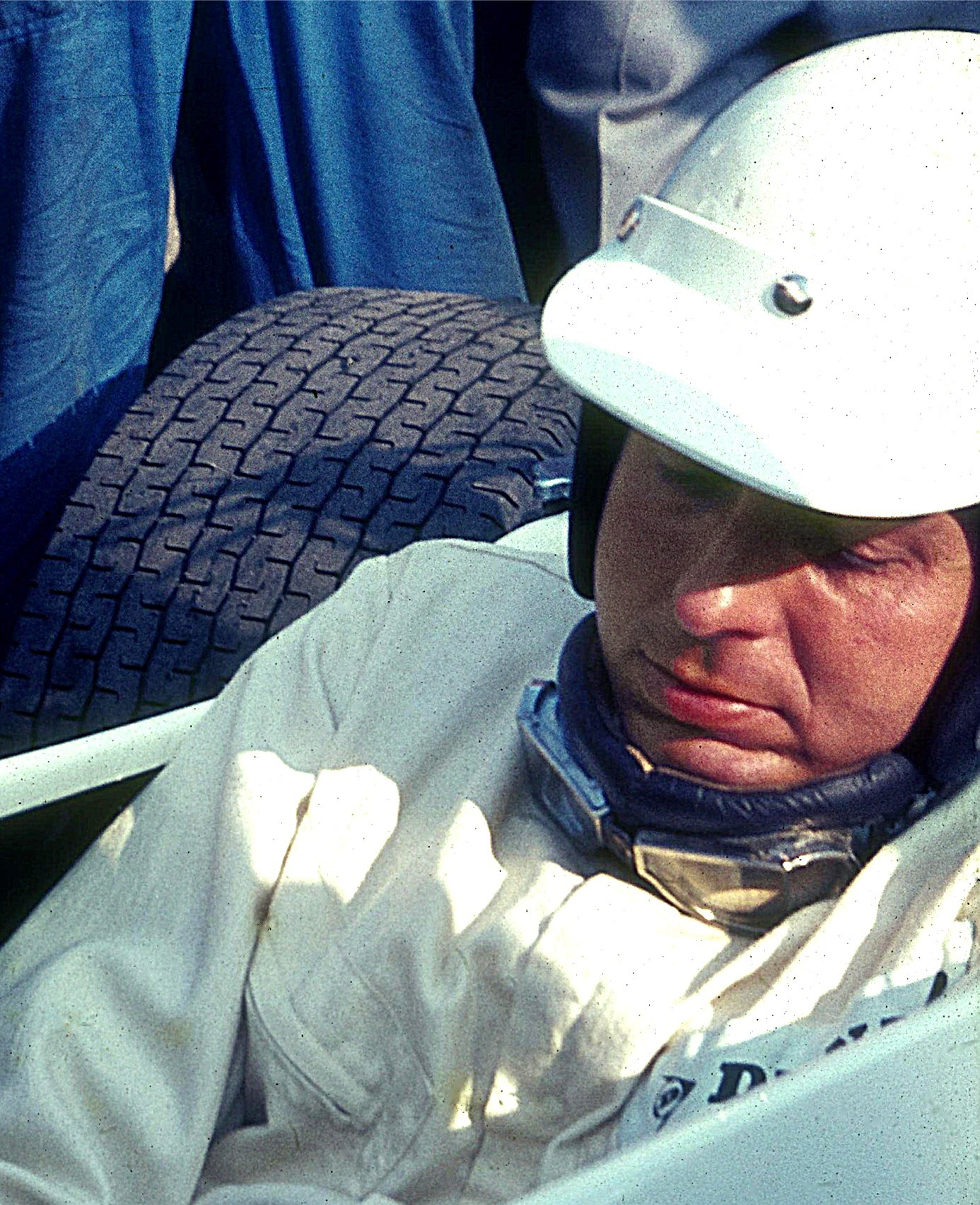
- Born: 28 March 1935; Moers, North Rhine-Westphalia, Germany
- Died: 24 April 2019 (aged 84); Düsseldorf, North Rhine-Westphalia, Germany
- Relatives: Armin Hahne (brother); Jörg van Ommen (nephew)

Formula One World Championship career
- Nationality: (Germany) German
- Active years: 1966 - 1970
- Team(s): Lola, March
- Entries: 5 (3 starts)
- Championships: 0
- Wins: 0
- Podiums: 0
- Career points: 0
- Pole positions: 0
- Fastest laps: 0
- First entry: 1966 German Grand Prix
- Last entry: 1970 German Grand Prix

Hubert Hahne (German pronunciation: [ˈhuːbɛʁt ˈhaːnə]; 28 March 1935 – 24 April 2019) was a racing driver from Germany. He was the older brother of Armin Hahne, as well as the uncle of Jörg van Ommen.

== Career ==
Hahne participated in five Formula One World Championship Grands Prix, two of those at the wheel of Formula Two cars, and one non-Championship Formula One race.

Hahne was successful in touring car racing, including the European Touring Car Championship, which he won in 1966 with a BMW New Class 2000TI. In the six-hour "Großer Preis der Tourenwagen" on 3 July 1966, an Alfa Romeo GTA had lowered the Nürburgring touring car race lap record to 10:08.9. A month later, in a support race for the 1966 German Grand Prix, Hahne was the first to lap the Nürburgring in under 10 minutes in a touring car, in 9:58.5.

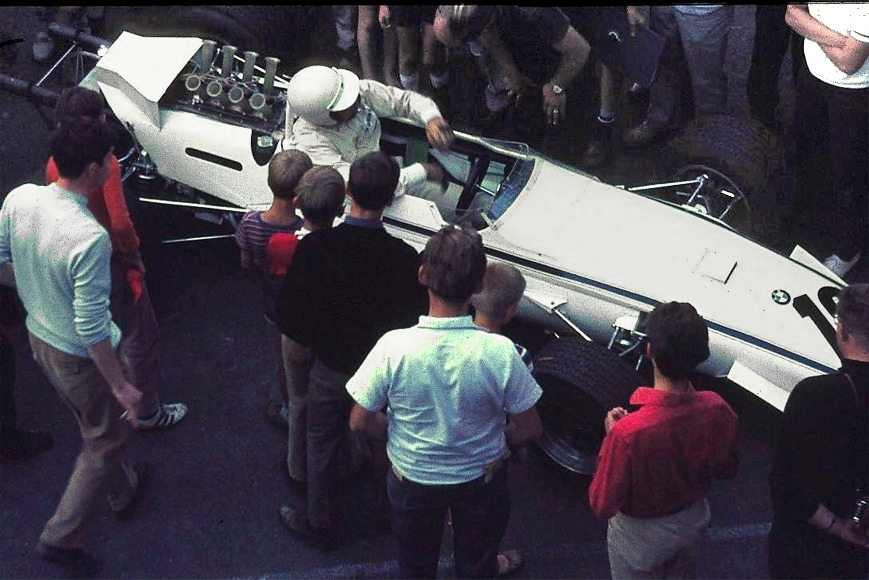
Hubert Hahne with Lola-BMW Formula 2 in 1968 at the Nürburgring

On the old and very long Nürburgring, Formula Two cars occasionally had their own race alongside the Formula One cars in the same events to fill the field, which provided other drivers like Kurt Ahrens Jr., Gerhard Mitter and Dieter Quester the opportunity to enter the German Grand Prix. As the Formula Two section was counted separately, the drivers could not score World Championship points. Hahne participated in the 1966 and 1969 German Grands Prix in the special Formula Two sections of those events, but withdrew before the start of the 1969 event due to the fatal accident suffered by his team-mate Gerhard Mitter.

For his true Formula One debut at the 1967 German Grand Prix, Hahne drove a Formula Two Lola chassis fitted with a 2-litre 16 valve BMW engine, thus qualifying the drive for Formula One. The BMW factory were allowed to run this to give some national encouragement. He retired on lap 7 with suspension failure. The following year he finished 10th in the same car.

Hahne got himself a March 701 for 1970, but could not qualify for the 1970 German Grand Prix which was held at the Hockenheimring that year. Hahne claimed that chassis and engine were among the worst of the many March and Cosworth delivered that year. Ronnie Peterson showed later at Silverstone that this very car could reach adequate times, and Hahne retired from racing.

== Racing record ==
=== Complete Formula One World Championship results ===
(key)

Year	Entrant	Chassis	Engine	1	2	3	4	5	6	7	8	9	10	11	12	13	WDC	Pts
1966	Tyrrell Racing Organisation	Matra MS5 (F2)	BRM P80 1.0 L4	MON	BEL	FRA	GBR	NED	GER; 9	ITA	USA	MEX					NC	0
1967	Bayerische Motoren Werke AG	Lola T100	BMW M10 2.0 L4	RSA	MON	NED	BEL	FRA	GBR	GER; Ret	CAN	ITA	USA	MEX			NC	0
1968	Bayerische Motoren Werke AG	Lola T102	BMW M12/1 1.6 L4	RSA	ESP	MON	BEL	NED	FRA	GBR	GER; 10	ITA	CAN	USA	MEX		NC	0
1969	Bayerische Motoren Werke AG	BMW 269 (F2)	BMW M12/1 1.6 L4	RSA	ESP	MON	NED	FRA	GBR	GER; DNS	ITA	CAN	USA	MEX			NC	0
1970	Hubert Hahne	March 701	Ford Cosworth DFV 3.0 V8	RSA	ESP	MON	BEL	NED	FRA	GBR	GER; DNQ	AUT	ITA	CAN	USA	MEX	NC	0

=== Complete European Formula Two Championship results ===
(key)

Year	Entrant	Chassis	Engine	1	2	3	4	5	6	7	8	9	10	Pos.	Pts
1967	BMW	Lola T100	BMW	SNE; DNQ	SIL	NÜR; 4	HOC	TUL	JAR	ZAN	PER	BRH; 9	VAL; Ret	12th	7
1968	BMW	Lola T102	BMW	HOC	THR	JAR	PAL	TUL	ZAN	PER	HOC; 7	VAL; 10		NC	0
1969	BMW	Lola T102	BMW	THR; 12	HOC; 2	NÜR; 4	JAR; 5							2nd	28
1969	BMW	BMW 269	BMW					TUL; 7	PER; DNS	VAL; Ret				2nd	28
1970	BMW	BMW 269	BMW	THR; DNQ	HOC; 4	BAR; DNQ	ROU; DNQ							13th	3
1970	BMW	BMW 270	BMW					PER; Ret	TUL	IMO	HOC			13th	3

=== Complete British Saloon Car Championship results ===
(key) (Races in bold indicate pole position; races in italics indicate fastest lap.)

Year	Team	Car	Class	1	2	3	4	5	6	7	8	9	10	11	Pos.	Pts	Class
1968	Malcolm Gartlan Racing	Ford Falcon Sprint	D	BRH	THR	SIL	CRY	MAL	**BRH** ovr:2 cls:1	SIL	CRO	OUL	BRH	BRH	28th	9	6th

Sporting positions
Preceded by Jacky Ickx	European Touring Car Championship; Div.3 Champion; 1966	Succeeded by Karl von Wendt
