= 1971 Argentine Grand Prix =

- Non-championship race in the 1971 Formula One season

Race details
- Date: 24 January 1971
- Official name: VIII Gran Premio de la Republica Argentina
- Location: Autódromo Oscar Alfredo Gálvez, Buenos Aires
- Course: Permanent racing facility
- Course length: 3.41 km (2.12 miles)
- Distance: 50 x 2 laps, 341.045 km (211.9 miles)
- Weather: Fine, cool

Pole position
Driver	(Germany) Rolf Stommelen	Surtees-Cosworth
- Time: 1:15.85

Fastest lap
Driver	(New Zealand) Chris Amon	Matra
- Time: 1:15.05

Podium
First	(New Zealand) Chris Amon	Matra
Second	(France) Henri Pescarolo	March-Cosworth
Third	(Argentina) Carlos Reutemann	McLaren-Cosworth

The 1971 Argentine Grand Prix was a motor race consisting of a Formula One class and a Formula 5000 class, held at the Buenos Aires circuit in Buenos Aires on 24 January 1971. The Formula One class was not part of the FIA Formula One World Championship.

This event was held because at that time the FIA regulations required a demonstration race to be held as a quality check, before a Grand Prix could be admitted as part of the World Championship. The race was run over two heats of 50 laps each, the final results being an aggregate of the two.

Scuderia Ferrari had entered three cars for this event, but they were withdrawn after the fatal accident suffered by Ignazio Giunti in a sports car race two weeks previously. Jean-Pierre Beltoise was also involved in that accident, and as a consequence had his international license suspended, and was unable to compete.

== Qualifying ==
Note: a blue background indicates a Formula 5000 entrant.

Pos	No.	Driver	Constructor	Lap	Gap
1	18	(Germany) Rolf Stommelen	Surtees-Cosworth	1:15.85	—
2	8	(New Zealand) Chris Amon	Matra	1:15.88	+0.03
3	4	(Sweden) Reine Wisell	Lotus-Cosworth	1:16.03	+0.18
4	2	(Brazil) Emerson Fittipaldi	Lotus-Cosworth	1:16.28	+0.43
5	16	(Argentina) Carlos Reutemann	McLaren-Cosworth	1:16.49	+0.64
6	12	(Switzerland) Jo Siffert	March-Cosworth	1:16.61	+0.76
7	14	(France) Henri Pescarolo	March-Cosworth	1:16.80	+0.95
8	10	(United Kingdom) Derek Bell	March-Cosworth	1:17.23	+1.38
9	6	(Brazil) Wilson Fittipaldi	Lotus-Cosworth	1:17.90	+2.05
10	20	(Switzerland) Silvio Moser	Bellasi-Cosworth	1:19.01	+3.16
11	22	(United Kingdom) David Prophet	McLaren-Chevrolet	1:20.58	+4.73
12	26	(Sweden) Jo Bonnier	Lola-Chevrolet	1:21.96	+6.11
13	24	(United Kingdom) Gordon Spice	McLaren-Chevrolet	1:23.45	+7.60
14	30	(Argentina) Nestor García-Veiga	Surtees-Chevrolet	1:26.26	+10.41
15	28	(Argentina) Carlos Marincovich	McLaren-Chevrolet	2:00.06	+44.15

== Heat one ==
Rolf Stommelen won the first heat, leading from the start, from Jo Siffert in second place. Siffert had held off the rest of the field, with Chris Amon passing Reine Wisell before duelling with Henri Pescarolo for third place. The Frenchman won this battle to take third at the finish, with Amon, Wisell and Carlos Reutemann rounding out the top six. Emerson Fittipaldi lost a nose fin and had to pit for a new one, losing three laps. He eventually finished 10th. The retirements were all F5000 cars, namely Jo Bonnier's Lola, which pulled off with a flat battery, and Marincovich's McLaren and Garcia-Veiga's Surtees, which both suffered mechanical failures. Wisell posted the fastest lap.

== Heat two ==
The grid for heat two was decided by the finishing order from the first heat, with Greg Young taking over Marincovich's car. At the start, Siffert pulled away from Stommelen to take the lead. Amon quickly passed Reutemann and Pescarolo to move into third place, but he caught Stommelen just as the German was trying to pass Siffert. Amon and Stommelen collided and Stommelen's Surtees went off the track, causing gearbox damage which soon proved to be terminal. Shortly afterwards, Amon passed Siffert for the lead. During the next two laps, Siffert was also passed by Pescarolo, Reutemann, Derek Bell's March and Wilson Fittipaldi's Lotus. Wisell pitted with handling problems, and Silvio Moser finally started the race after extensive engine work being performed in the pits, meaning he missed the start. Wilson Fittipaldi then retired on lap 21 with engine failure, and Wisell and Moser also retired. Bell passed Reutemann but retired after that with another engine failure. Siffert had also retired his March with broken suspension. Amon won the heat by 22 seconds from Pescarolo, and this margin gave him the overall victory, his only win of the season. He also posted the fastest lap of the heat, which was the overall fastest lap.

== Classification ==
Note: the classification was determined using the sum of the times obtained in the two heats.

Pos	No.	Driver	Entrant	Constructor	Laps	Time/Retired	1st / 2nd heat
1	8	(New Zealand) Chris Amon	Equipe Matra Elf	Matra	100	2:08:19.29	4th / 1st
2	14	(France) Henri Pescarolo	Frank Williams Racing Cars	March-Cosworth	100	+ 21.86 s	3rd / 2nd
3	16	(Argentina) Carlos Reutemann	Ecurie Bonnier	McLaren-Cosworth	100	+ 53.31 s	6th / 3rd
4	22	(United Kingdom) David Prophet	David Prophet Racing	McLaren-Chevrolet	96	+ 4 Laps	9th / 4th
Ret	10	(United Kingdom) Derek Bell	Tom Wheatcroft Racing	March-Cosworth	88	Engine	7th / Ret
Ret	12	(Switzerland) Jo Siffert	Siffert Racing Team	March-Cosworth	86	Suspension	2nd / Ret
Ret	4	(Sweden) Reine Wisell	Gold Leaf Team Lotus	Lotus-Cosworth	84	Accident	5th / Ret
NC	24	(United Kingdom) Gordon Spice	Gordon Spice	McLaren-Chevrolet	84		12th / 5th
Ret	6	(Brazil) Wilson Fittipaldi	Gold Leaf Team Lotus	Lotus-Cosworth	71	Engine	8th / Ret
NC	26	(Sweden) Jo Bonnier	Ecurie Bonnier	Lola-Chevrolet	68	Battery	Ret / 7th
Ret	20	(Switzerland) Silvio Moser	Jolly Club Switzerland	Bellasi-Cosworth	66	Engine	11th / Ret
Ret	18	(Germany) Rolf Stommelen	Team Surtees	Surtees-Cosworth	60	Gearbox	1st / Ret
NC	28	(Argentina) Carlos Marincovich (United Kingdom) Greg Young	Luigi Chinetti	McLaren-Chevrolet	59	Fuel injection	Ret / 6th
Ret	2	(Brazil) Emerson Fittipaldi	Gold Leaf Team Lotus	Lotus-Cosworth	48	Oil pressure	10th / Ret
Ret	30	(Argentina) Nestor García-Veiga	Luigi Chinetti	Surtees-Chevrolet	11	Oil leak	Ret / DNS
WD		(United States) Mario Andretti	Scuderia Ferrari	Ferrari			
WD		(Belgium) Jacky Ickx	Scuderia Ferrari	Ferrari			
WD		(Switzerland) Clay Regazzoni	Scuderia Ferrari	Ferrari			
WD		(Italy) Ignazio Giunti	Scuderia Ferrari	Ferrari			
WD		(France) Jean-Pierre Beltoise	Equipe Matra Elf	Matra			
WD		(United Kingdom) Chris Craft	Alain de Cadenet	Brabham-Cosworth			
WD		(Sweden) Ronnie Peterson	March Racing Team	March-Cosworth			

Previous race: 1970 International Gold Cup	Formula One non-championship races 1971 season	Next race: 1971 Race of Champions
Previous race: 1960 Argentine Grand Prix	Argentine Grand Prix	Next race: 1972 Argentine Grand Prix
