= Ignazio Giunti =

Italian racing driver (1941–1971)

- Born: 30 August 1941; Rome, Italy
- Died: 10 January 1971 (aged 29); Buenos Aires, Argentina

Formula One World Championship career
- Nationality: (Italy) Italian
- Active years: 1970
- Team: Ferrari
- Entries: 4
- Championships: 0
- Wins: 0
- Podiums: 0
- Career points: 3
- Pole positions: 0
- Fastest laps: 0
- First entry: 1970 Belgian Grand Prix
- Last entry: 1970 Italian Grand Prix

Ignazio Francesco Giunti (Italian pronunciation: [iɲˈɲattsjo franˈtʃesko ˈdʒunti]; 30 August 1941 – 10 January 1971) was an Italian racing driver. He competed in Formula One as well as in saloon and Sports Car Racing.

Giunti was born in Rome. In 1968, driving for Alfa Romeo, he finished second in the Targa Florio and fourth in the Le Mans 24 Hours race co-driving with Nanni Galli.

In 1970, Giunti was signed by Ferrari primarily for their sports-car team, and won the 12 Hours of Sebring as well as achieving several other high placings. His success earned him a Formula One chance along with Clay Regazzoni, who Ferrari was also trialling at the time. Giunti finished fourth on his debut in the Belgian GP at Spa. Despite his being out-performed by Regazzoni during the remaining races, he was re-signed by Ferrari for the following season.

Giunti was killed during his first drive in 1971 whilst racing in the 1000 km Buenos Aires. He was leading the race when his Ferrari 312PB prototype ploughed into the back of the Matra-Simca MS660 of Jean-Pierre Beltoise, who was pushing the car along the track after it had run out of fuel. Giunti died due to the impact and the subsequent fire.

== Complete Formula One results ==
(key)

Yr	Entrant	Chassis	Engine	1	2	3	4	5	6	7	8	9	10	11	12	13	WDC	Points
1970	Scuderia Ferrari	Ferrari 312B	Ferrari Flat 12	RSA	ESP	MON	BEL; 4	NED	FRA; 14	GBR	GER	AUT; 7	ITA; Ret	CAN	USA	MEX	17th	3

== Sources ==
- Formula One World Championship results are derived from "The Official Formula 1 website". Archived from the original on 2010-06-21.
- Steve Small. The Guinness Complete Grand Prix Who's Who. p. 160. ISBN 0851127029.
