= Lola T102 =

The Lola T102, also known as the BMW T102, is a Formula 2 car, designed, developed and built by Lola Cars, under the leadership and guidance of Eric Broadley. It competed between 1968 and 1969. It entered and competed in one Formula One Grand Prix; the 1968 German Grand Prix; where German driver Hubert Hahne finished in tenth place.

== Design ==
The BMW T102 was built entirely by Lola but exclusively for BMW; hence the type designation BMW T102. The design came from the British racing car designer Len Terry. The T102 had Lola's then-typical bathtub monocoque. The body ran slim along with the cockpit and only got wider in the rear section to accommodate the engine. This was a design by Austrian BMW engineer Ludwig Apfelbeck. The 2-litre engine had four cylinders, each with four valves. When the engine had to be reduced to a displacement of 1.6 litres, problems arose with the valve control and BMW used a new unit.

== 1968 German Grand Prix ==
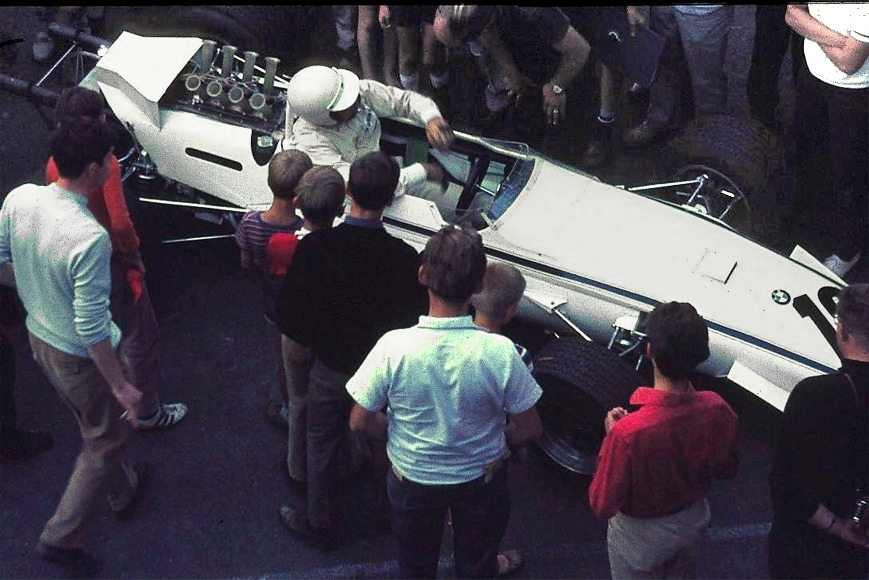
Hubert Hahne aboard the Lola T102 at the 1968 German Grand Prix

At the 1968 German Grand Prix, Hubert Hahne set the eighteenth qualifying time of 10 min 42.9 s, 1 min 38.9 s off the pole position time set by Ferrari driver Jacky Ickx. In the race, the German overtook the Cooper of Lucien Bianchi and the McLaren of Bruce McLaren to occupy sixteenth place at the end of the second lap. On the next lap, he got the better of Dan Gurney, then the Lotus 49Bs of Jo Siffert and Jackie Oliver, and grabbed eleventh place on lap seven. The second half of the event pitted him against Gurney who overtook him on lap eleven, but Hahne finished tenth in the race, 10 min 11.3 s behind winner Jackie Stewart.

== Formula 2 career ==
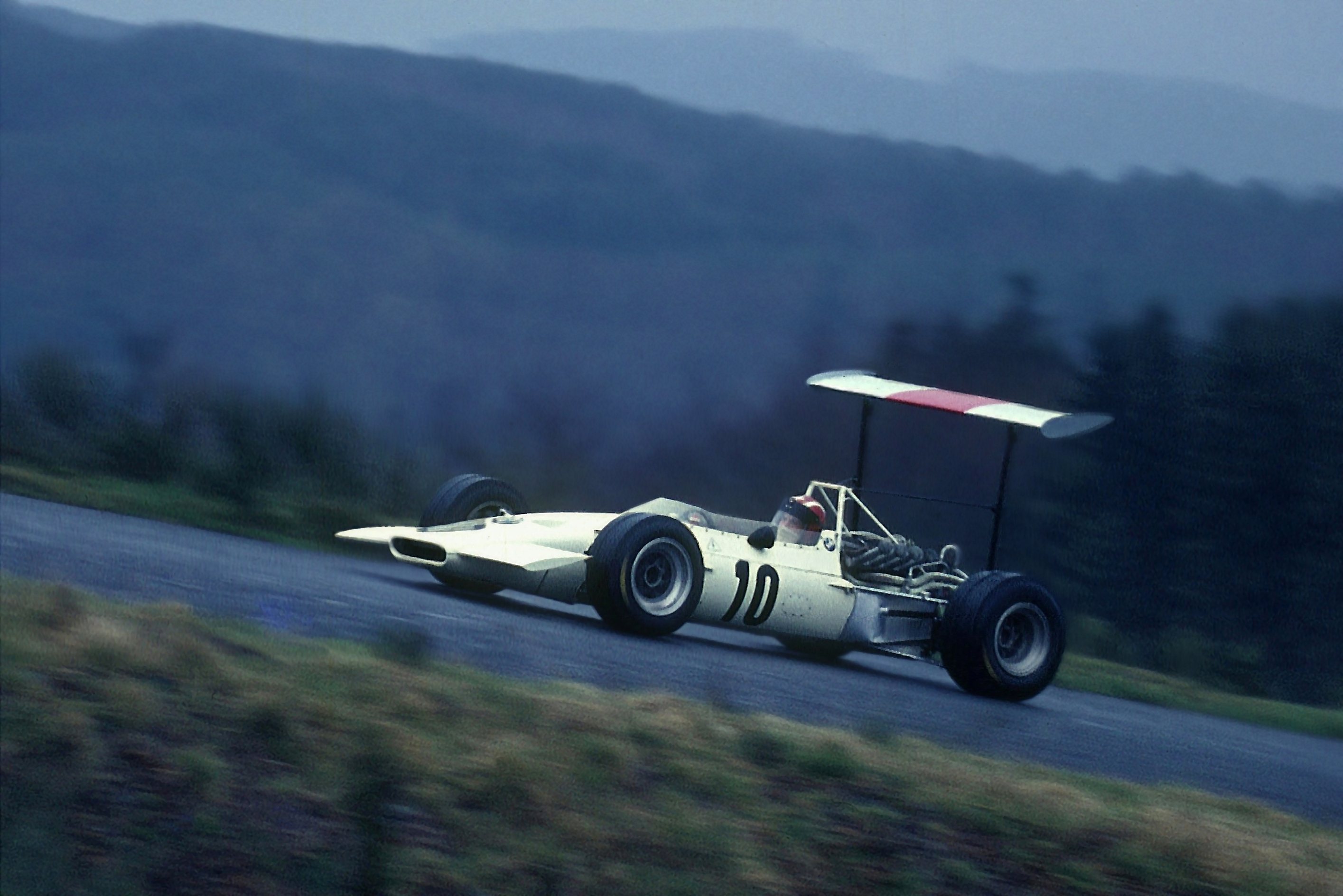
Jo Siffert driving a Lola T102 at the Nürburgring in 1969

After this brief interlude in the top motorsport series, the T102 continued to race in the 1968 and 1969 Formula 2 championships, finishing second in the drivers' championship in 1969, obtaining two outright second places as best results with Hahne at the Hockenheimring and with Jo Siffert at the Nürburgring, where the Swiss also managed to qualify on pole position.

When there were no major successes in 1968, the two T102s were completely revised. At the 1969 Jim Clark race in Hockenheim, a round of the Formula 2 European Championship, Hahne achieved his first podium finish with second place behind Jean-Pierre Beltoise in the Matra MS7. Fourteen days later, Siffert was only beaten by a Matra at the Eifel Race on the Nürburgring, this time with Jackie Stewart at the wheel. After further strong performances, Hahne finished second in the overall standings of the European Championships at the end of the season.

The team also suffered a tragic accident. Gerhard Mitter had a fatal accident in a BMW 269, the successor to the T102, during practice for the 1969 German Grand Prix after a technical defect.

== Formula One World Championship results ==
(key)

Year	Entrant	Engines	Tyres	Drivers	1	2	3	4	5	6	7	8	9	10	11	12	WCC	Pts.
1968	Bayerische Motoren Werke AG	BMW M12/1 1.6 L4	D		RSA	ESP	MON	BEL	NED	FRA	GBR	GER	ITA	CAN	USA	MEX	NC	0
1968	Bayerische Motoren Werke AG	BMW M12/1 1.6 L4	D	(West Germany) Hubert Hahne								10					NC	0
