= 1971 Italian Grand Prix =

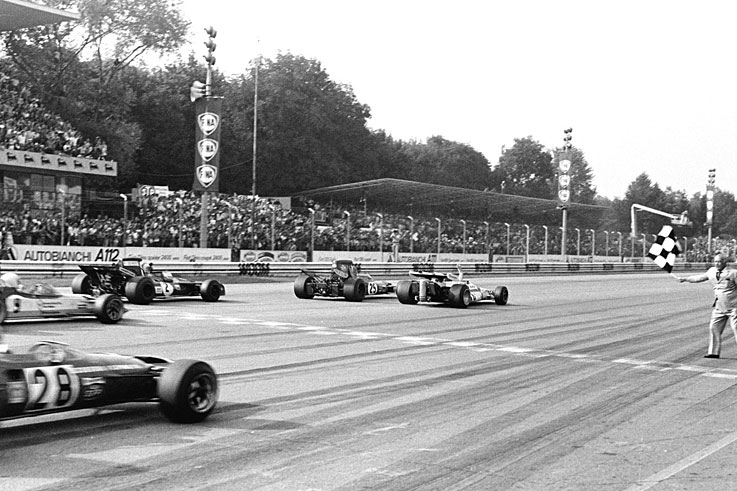
- The close finish of the race, showing four of the five drivers who crossed the finish line within a second (car number 28, on the left, was four laps down).

Race details
- Date: 5 September 1971
- Official name: 42º Gran Premio d'Italia
- Location: Autodromo Nazionale di Monza; Monza, Lombardy, Italy
- Course: Permanent racing facility
- Course length: 5.750 km (3.573 miles)
- Distance: 55 laps, 316.25 km (196.515 miles)

Pole position
Driver	(New Zealand) Chris Amon	Matra
- Time: 1:22.4

Fastest lap
Driver	(France) Henri Pescarolo	March-Ford
- Time: 1:23.8 on lap 9

Podium
First	(United Kingdom) Peter Gethin	BRM
Second	(Sweden) Ronnie Peterson	March-Ford
Third	(France) François Cevert	Tyrrell-Ford

The 1971 Italian Grand Prix was a Formula One motor race held at Monza on 5 September 1971. It was race 9 of 11 in both the 1971 World Championship of Drivers and the 1971 International Cup for Formula One Manufacturers.

This race featured the closest finish in Formula One history, as Peter Gethin beat Ronnie Peterson by 0.01 seconds. The top five were covered by just 0.61 seconds, with François Cevert finishing third, Mike Hailwood fourth and Howden Ganley fifth. With an average speed of 242.615 km/h (150.754 mph), this race stood as the fastest-ever Formula One race for 32 years, until the 2003 Italian Grand Prix at Monza.

Furthermore, it would turn out to be Gethin's only Grand Prix victory before retiring from Formula One in 1974.

== Race report ==
The historical Monza National Autodrome, located just north of the northern Italian city of Milan, in 1971 became the fastest circuit used by Formula One after the Belgian Spa-Francorchamps circuit was removed from the calendar. However, this was the last year in which the circuit was used with this configuration: considering the enormous speed that the cars reached in this edition, two chicanes were introduced the following year in the two most dangerous curves of the track. Before and during the race there were several tributes in memory of reigning champions Jochen Rindt who had died the previous season.

Emerson Fittipaldi drove a four-wheel drive Lotus 56B powered by a gas turbine, the only time he would race in a Formula One World Championship race in a car not powered by a Ford Cosworth DFV engine. Due to ongoing legal issues between Team Lotus and the Italian authorities following Jochen Rindt's death the previous year, the car was entered under the name "World Wide Racing".

With the championship settled, this was an opportunity for new drivers to prove themselves. Chris Amon in the Matra proved an embarrassment to Ferrari by seizing pole at their home track with the fastest lap of all time in a Formula One championship race, lapping at 251 km/h (156 mph), with the BRMs on the second row, whilst champion Stewart was in 6th after suffering gearbox problems. Mike Hailwood was making his debut for Surtees—an inspired choice as he held both the Formula 5000 and motorbike lap records for Monza. Clay Regazzoni's Ferrari thrilled the crowd by surging forward from the fourth row to lead from Jo Siffert and Stewart until lap 3, when Ronnie Peterson took the lead. On lap 7, Stewart took the lead. By lap 16, Stewart and Jacky Ickx retired with engine problems, followed two laps later by Clay Regazzoni. The race began to break into high-speed packs—the leading one containing Hailwood (leading on his debut), François Cevert, Peterson, Siffert, Howden Ganley, Chris Amon, Peter Gethin and Jackie Oliver. Gethin, Peterson, Cevert, Hailwood and Ganley (who fell back slightly) battled right down to the line and the top 4 finished within two-tenths of a second of each other, with Ganley a further four-tenths back in fifth. Polesitter Amon took the last point in sixth, nearly half a minute behind Ganley. Siffert dropped back after problems with a gearbox that would only select fourth gear. Tyrrell-Ford won their first Constructors' Championship with two races remaining.

== Classification ==
=== Qualifying ===
Pos	No	Driver	Constructor	Time	Gap
1	12	(New Zealand) Chris Amon	Matra	1:22.40	—
2	3	(Belgium) Jacky Ickx	Ferrari	1:22.82	+0.42
3	20	(Switzerland) Jo Siffert	BRM	1:23.03	+0.63
4	19	(New Zealand) Howden Ganley	BRM	1:23.15	+0.75
5	2	(France) François Cevert	Tyrrell-Ford	1:23.41	+1.01
6	25	(Sweden) Ronnie Peterson	March-Ford	1:23.46	+1.06
7	30	(United Kingdom) Jackie Stewart	Tyrrell-Ford	1:23.49	+1.09
8	4	(Switzerland) Clay Regazzoni	Ferrari	1:23.69	+1.29
9	11	(Australia) Tim Schenken	Brabham-Ford	1:23.73	+1.33
10	16	(France) Henri Pescarolo	March-Ford	1:23.77	+1.37
11	18	(United Kingdom) Peter Gethin	BRM	1:23.88	+1.48
12	21	(Austria) Helmut Marko	BRM	1:23.96	+1.56
13	14	(United Kingdom) Jackie Oliver	McLaren-Ford	1:24.09	+1.69
14	10	(United Kingdom) Graham Hill	Brabham-Ford	1:24.27	+1.87
15	7	(United Kingdom) John Surtees	Surtees-Ford	1:24.45	+2.05
16	24	(United Kingdom) Mike Beuttler	March-Ford	1:25.01	+2.61
17	9	(United Kingdom) Mike Hailwood	Surtees-Ford	1:25.17	+2.77
18	5	(Brazil) Emerson Fittipaldi	Lotus-Pratt & Whitney	1:25.18	+2.78
19	22	(Italy) Nanni Galli	March-Ford	1:25.19	+2.79
20	23	(Italy) Andrea de Adamich	March-Alfa Romeo	1:25.73	+3.33
21	28	(Sweden) Jo Bonnier	McLaren-Ford	1:26.14	+3.74
22	27	(Switzerland) Silvio Moser	Bellasi-Ford	1:26.54	+4.14
23	8	(Germany) Rolf Stommelen	Surtees-Ford	1:27.92	+5.52
24	26	(France) Jean-Pierre Jarier	March-Ford	1:28.19	+5.89

=== Race ===
Pos	No	Driver	Constructor	Laps	Time/Retired	Grid	Points
1	18	(United Kingdom) Peter Gethin	BRM	55	1:18:12.60	11	9
2	25	(Sweden) Ronnie Peterson	March-Ford	55	+ 0.01	6	6
3	2	(France) François Cevert	Tyrrell-Ford	55	+ 0.09	5	4
4	9	(United Kingdom) Mike Hailwood	Surtees-Ford	55	+ 0.18	17	3
5	19	(New Zealand) Howden Ganley	BRM	55	+ 0.61	4	2
6	12	(New Zealand) Chris Amon	Matra	55	+ 32.36	1	1
7	14	(United Kingdom) Jackie Oliver	McLaren-Ford	55	+ 1:24.83	13	
8	5	(Brazil) Emerson Fittipaldi	Lotus-Pratt & Whitney	54	+ 1 Lap	18	
9	20	(Switzerland) Jo Siffert	BRM	53	+ 2 Laps	3	
10	28	(Sweden) Jo Bonnier	McLaren-Ford	51	+ 4 Laps	21	
Ret	10	(United Kingdom) Graham Hill	Brabham-Ford	47	Gearbox	14	
NC	26	(France) Jean-Pierre Jarier	March-Ford	47	+ 8 Laps	24	
Ret	24	(United Kingdom) Mike Beuttler	March-Ford	41	Engine	16	
Ret	16	(France) Henri Pescarolo	March-Ford	40	Suspension	10	
Ret	23	(Italy) Andrea de Adamich	March-Alfa Romeo	33	Engine	20	
Ret	4	(Switzerland) Clay Regazzoni	Ferrari	17	Engine	8	
Ret	3	(Belgium) Jacky Ickx	Ferrari	15	Engine	2	
Ret	30	(United Kingdom) Jackie Stewart	Tyrrell-Ford	15	Engine	7	
Ret	22	(Italy) Nanni Galli	March-Ford	11	Electrical	19	
Ret	11	(Australia) Tim Schenken	Brabham-Ford	5	Suspension	9	
Ret	27	(Switzerland) Silvio Moser	Bellasi-Ford	5	Suspension	22	
Ret	21	(Austria) Helmut Marko	BRM	3	Engine	12	
Ret	7	(United Kingdom) John Surtees	Surtees-Ford	3	Engine	15	
DNS	8	(Germany) Rolf Stommelen	Surtees-Ford	0	Accident	23	
WD	6	(Switzerland) Herbert Müller	Lotus-Ford				
WD	15	(Brazil) Carlos Pace	March-Ford				
WD	29	(France) François Mazet	March-Ford				

== Notes ==
- This was the Formula One World Championship debut for French driver Jean-Pierre Jarier.
- This race saw the 5th podium finish for a Swedish driver.
- This race marked the 1st pole position for a Matra-powered car.

== Championship standings after the race ==
Drivers' Championship standings

	Pos	Driver	Points
	1	(United Kingdom) **Jackie Stewart**	51
1	2	(Sweden) Ronnie Peterson	23
1	3	(Belgium) Jacky Ickx	19
4	4	(France) François Cevert	16
1	5	(Brazil) Emerson Fittipaldi	16

Constructors' Championship standings

	Pos	Constructor	Points
	1	(United Kingdom) **Tyrrell-Ford**	55
	2	(Italy) Ferrari	32
	3	(United Kingdom) BRM	30
1	4	(United Kingdom) March-Ford	24
1	5	(United Kingdom) Lotus-Ford	19

- Note: Only the top five positions are included for both sets of standings.
- Bold text indicates the 1971 World Champions.

Previous race: 1971 Austrian Grand Prix	FIA Formula One World Championship; 1971 season	Next race: 1971 Canadian Grand Prix
Previous race: 1970 Italian Grand Prix	Italian Grand Prix	Next race: 1972 Italian Grand Prix
