= Silvio Moser =

Swiss racing driver (1941–1974)

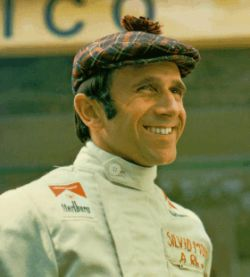
- Born: 24 April 1941; Zürich, Switzerland
- Died: 26 May 1974 (aged 33); Locarno, Ticino, Switzerland

Formula One World Championship career
- Nationality: (Switzerland) Swiss
- Active years: 1966–1971
- Team(s): Privateer Cooper, Brabham and Bellasi
- Entries: 20 (12 starts)
- Championships: 0
- Wins: 0
- Podiums: 0
- Career points: 3
- Pole positions: 0
- Fastest laps: 0
- First entry: 1966 German Grand Prix
- Last entry: 1971 Italian Grand Prix

Silvio Moser (24 April 1941 – 26 May 1974) was a racing driver from Switzerland.

== Early life and career ==
Moser began his career in the early sixties, racing Alfa Romeos and moved to single seaters in 1964, with a good deal of success both in European Formula three and the Temporada Series, where he won the championship.

== Formula One ==
Having built a strong reputation in Formula Junior/Three, Formula Two and sports car racing, Moser debuted in Formula One on 15 July 1967 at the British Grand Prix with a Vögele Team Cooper-ATS. Prior to this he had attempted to qualify for the German Grand Prix in 1966 with a Formula Two Brabham–Cosworth BT16, entered in his own name, but the engine failed in practice. He continued in 1968 with a Brabham-Repco BT20, in 1969 in a privately entered Brabham BT24 Cosworth, in 1970 with the Bellasi-Cosworth and again for one race in 1971. In total, he participated in 19 Formula One World Championship Grands Prix (12 starts), scoring a total of three championship points.

== Post Formula One and death ==
In 1970 Moser won the St. Ursanne-Les Rangiers and the Kerenzerberg Hillclimb with the Bellasi team.

After the failure of the Bellasi project, Moser returned to Formula Two and drove a Brabham in 1971 and 1972, and a Surtees in 1973, with limited success, but managed second place at Monza in the Lottery GP.

Moser died from severe injuries without regaining consciousness, 31 days after being involved in an accident while driving his Lola T294-BMW in the 1,000 km sports car race at Monza.

== Racing record ==
=== Complete Formula One World Championship results ===
(key)

Year	Entrant	Chassis	Engine	1	2	3	4	5	6	7	8	9	10	11	12	13	WDC	Pts
1966	Silvio Moser	Brabham BT16 F2	Ford Cosworth SCA 1.0 L4	MON	BEL	FRA	GBR	NED	GER; DNS	ITA	USA	MEX					NC	0
1967	Charles Vögele	Cooper T77	ATS 2.7 V8	RSA	MON	NED	BEL	FRA	GBR; Ret	GER	CAN	ITA	USA	MEX			NC	0
1968	Charles Vögele	Brabham BT20	Repco-Brabham RB620 3.0 V8	RSA	ESP	MON; DNQ	BEL	NED; 5	FRA	GBR; NC	GER; DNS	ITA; DNQ	CAN	USA	MEX		23rd	2
1969	Silvio Moser Racing Team	Brabham BT24	Ford Cosworth DFV 3.0 V8	RSA	ESP	MON; Ret	NED; Ret	FRA; 7	GBR	GER	ITA; Ret	CAN; Ret	USA; 6	MEX; 11			16th	1
1970	Silvio Moser Racing Team	Bellasi F1 70	Ford Cosworth DFV 3.0 V8	RSA	ESP	MON	BEL	NED; DNQ	FRA; DNQ	GBR	GER; DNQ	AUT; Ret	ITA; DNQ	CAN	USA	MEX	NC	0
1971	Jolly Club of Switzerland	Bellasi F1 70	Ford Cosworth DFV 3.0 V8	RSA	ESP	MON	NED	FRA	GBR	GER	AUT	ITA; Ret	CAN	USA			NC	0

=== Complete Formula One Non-Championship results ===
(key)

Year	Entrant	Chassis	Engine	1	2	3	4	5	6	7	8
1967	Fritz Baumann	Cooper T77	ATS 2.7 V8	ROC	SPC	INT	SYR; Ret	OUL	ESP		
1968	Charles Vögele	Brabham BT20	Repco-Brabham RB620 3.0 V8	ROC; Ret	INT; 7	OUL					
1969	Silvio Moser Racing Team	Brabham BT24	Ford Cosworth DFV 3.0 V8	ROC	INT	MAD	OUL; 10				
1971	Jolly Club of Switzerland	Bellasi F1 70	Ford Cosworth DFV 3.0 V8	ARG; Ret	ROC	QUE	SPR	INT	RIN	OUL	VIC

=== Complete European Formula Two Championship results ===
(key) (Races in bold indicate pole position; races in italics indicate fastest lap)

Year	Entrant	Chassis	Engine	1	2	3	4	5	6	7	8	9	10	11	12	13	14	15	16	17	Pos.	Pts
1968	Charles Vögele Racing Team	Tecno TF68	Ford	HOC	THR	JAR	PAL	TUL; Ret	ZAN; 4	PER; 11	HOC	VAL; 11									15th	3
1971	Silvio Moser Racing Team	Brabham BT30	Ford	HOC	THR	NÜR	JAR; 9	PAL; 7	ROU; DNQ	MAN	TUL										18th	2
1971	Silvio Moser Racing Team	Brabham BT36	Ford									ALB; DNQ	VAL; 14	VAL; 6							18th	2
1972	Jolly Club of Switzerland	Brabham BT38	Ford	MAL	THR	HOC	PAU; DNQ	PAL; 9													NC	0
1972	Silvio Moser Racing Team	Brabham BT38	Ford						HOC; 12	ROU											NC	0
1972	Scuderia del Lario	Brabham BT38	Ford								ÖST; 14	IMO; NC	MAN	PER; Ret	SAL	ALB; 10	HOC; 13				NC	0
1973	Silvio Moser Racing Team	Surtees TS10	Ford	MAL	HOC; Ret	THR; 11	NÜR; 8	PAU; Ret	KIN	NIV; 10	HOC; 7	ROU	MNZ; Ret	MAN; Ret	KAR; 12	PER; Ret	SAL; Ret	NOR; Ret	ALB; DNQ		29th	2
1973	Brian Lewis Racing	March 732	BMW																	VAL; Ret	29th	2
