= 1970 German Grand Prix =

Race details
- Date: August 2, 1970
- Official name: XXXII Großer Preis von Deutschland
- Location: Hockenheimring
- Course: Permanent racing facility
- Course length: 6.790 km (4.219 miles)
- Distance: 50 laps, 339.5 km (210.9 miles)

Pole position
Driver	(Belgium) Jacky Ickx	Ferrari
- Time: 1:59.5

Fastest lap
Driver	(Belgium) Jacky Ickx	Ferrari
- Time: 2:00.5 on lap 50

Podium
First	(Austria) Jochen Rindt	Lotus-Ford
Second	(Belgium) Jacky Ickx	Ferrari
Third	(New Zealand) Denny Hulme	McLaren-Ford

The 1970 German Grand Prix was a Formula One motor race held at the Hockenheimring on 2 August 1970. It was race 8 of 13 in both the 1970 World Championship of Drivers and the 1970 International Cup for Formula One Manufacturers. The 50-lap race was won by Lotus driver Jochen Rindt after he started from second position. Jacky Ickx finished second for the Ferrari team and McLaren driver Denny Hulme came in third.

On short notice following the drivers' demand for improved safety at the Nürburgring, the race was moved to Hockenheim for the first time in the history of the German Grand Prix as this track already had been fitted with Armco. F1 returned to an updated Nürburgring in 1971.

This was Rindt's final win in his career before his death at the Italian Grand Prix that year at Monza.

== Qualifying ==
=== Qualifying classification ===
Pos	No	Driver	Constructor	Time	Gap	Grid
1	10	(Belgium) Jacky Ickx	Ferrari	1:59.5	—	1
2	2	(Austria) Jochen Rindt	Lotus-Ford	1:59.7	+0.2	2
3	15	(Switzerland) Clay Regazzoni	Ferrari	1:59.8	+0.3	3
4	12	(Switzerland) Jo Siffert	March-Ford	2:00.0	+0.5	4
5	14	(France) Henri Pescarolo	Matra	2:00.5	+1.0	5
6	5	(New Zealand) Chris Amon	March-Ford	2:00.9	+1.4	6
7	1	(United Kingdom) Jackie Stewart	March-Ford	2:01.0	+1.5	7
8	6	(Mexico) Pedro Rodríguez	BRM	2:01.1	+1.6	8
9	11	(United States) Mario Andretti	March-Ford	2:01.5	+2.0	9
10	16	(United Kingdom) John Miles	Lotus-Ford	2:01.6	+2.1	10
11	21	(Germany) Rolf Stommelen	Brabham-Ford	2:01.6	+2.1	11
12	3	(Australia) Jack Brabham	Brabham-Ford	2:02.0	+2.5	12
13	17	(Brazil) Emerson Fittipaldi	Lotus-Ford	2:02.0	+2.5	13
14	23	(France) François Cevert	March-Ford	2:02.1	+2.6	14
15	7	(United Kingdom) John Surtees	Surtees-Ford	2:02.1	+2.6	15
16	4	(New Zealand) Denny Hulme	McLaren-Ford	2:02.1	+2.6	16
17	24	(United Kingdom) Peter Gethin	McLaren-Ford	2:02.2	+2.7	17
18	18	(United Kingdom) Jackie Oliver	BRM	2:02.3	+2.8	18
19	22	(Sweden) Ronnie Peterson	March-Ford	2:02.4	+2.9	19
DNQ	25	(United Kingdom) Brian Redman	De Tomaso-Ford	2:02.7	+3.2	—
21	9	(United Kingdom) Graham Hill	Lotus-Ford	2:03.0	+3.5	20
DNQ	20	(Italy) Andrea de Adamich	McLaren-Alfa Romeo	2:03.0	+3.5	—
23	8	(France) Jean-Pierre Beltoise	Matra	2:05.2	+5.7	21
DNQ	27	(Switzerland) Silvio Moser	Bellasi-Ford	2:06.2	+6.7	—
DNQ	26	(Germany) Hubert Hahne	March-Ford	2:07.1	+7.6	—

== Race ==
=== Classification ===
Pos	No	Driver	Constructor	Laps	Time/Retired	Grid	Points
1	2	(Austria) Jochen Rindt	Lotus-Ford	50	1:42:00.3	2	9
2	10	(Belgium) Jacky Ickx	Ferrari	50	+ 0.7	1	6
3	4	(New Zealand) Denny Hulme	McLaren-Ford	50	+ 1:21.8	16	4
4	17	(Brazil) Emerson Fittipaldi	Lotus-Ford	50	+ 1:55.1	13	3
5	21	(West Germany) Rolf Stommelen	Brabham-Ford	49	+ 1 Lap	11	2
6	14	(France) Henri Pescarolo	Matra	49	+ 1 Lap	5	1
7	23	(France) François Cevert	March-Ford	49	+ 1 Lap	14	
8	12	(Switzerland) Jo Siffert	March-Ford	47	Ignition	4	
9	7	(United Kingdom) John Surtees	Surtees-Ford	46	Engine	15	
Ret	9	(United Kingdom) Graham Hill	Lotus-Ford	37	Engine	20	
Ret	5	(New Zealand) Chris Amon	March-Ford	34	Engine	6	
Ret	15	(Switzerland) Clay Regazzoni	Ferrari	30	Engine	3	
Ret	16	(United Kingdom) John Miles	Lotus-Ford	24	Engine	10	
Ret	1	(United Kingdom) Jackie Stewart	March-Ford	20	Engine	7	
Ret	11	(United States) Mario Andretti	March-Ford	15	Gearbox	9	
Ret	22	(Sweden) Ronnie Peterson	March-Ford	11	Engine	19	
Ret	6	(Mexico) Pedro Rodriguez	BRM	7	Ignition	8	
Ret	18	(United Kingdom) Jackie Oliver	BRM	5	Engine	18	
Ret	3	(Australia) Jack Brabham	Brabham-Ford	4	Oil Leak	12	
Ret	8	(France) Jean-Pierre Beltoise	Matra	4	Suspension	21	
Ret	24	(United Kingdom) Peter Gethin	McLaren-Ford	3	Throttle	17	
DNQ	25	(United Kingdom) Brian Redman	De Tomaso-Ford				
DNQ	20	(Italy) Andrea de Adamich	McLaren-Alfa Romeo				
DNQ	27	(Switzerland) Silvio Moser	Bellasi-Ford				
DNQ	26	(West Germany) Hubert Hahne	March-Ford				

== Notes ==
- This was the 50th pole position for a Ferrari-powered car.
- This was the 50th race for a Ford-powered car.

== Championship standings after the race ==
Drivers' Championship standings

	Pos	Driver	Points
	1	(Austria) **Jochen Rindt***	45
	2	(Australia) **Jack Brabham***	25
1	3	(New Zealand) **Denny Hulme***	20
1	4	(United Kingdom) **Jackie Stewart***	19
	5	(New Zealand) **Chris Amon***	14

Constructors' Championship standings

	Pos	Constructor	Points
	1	(United Kingdom) **Lotus-Ford***	50
	2	(United Kingdom) **March-Ford***	33
	3	(United Kingdom) **Brabham-Ford***	29
	4	(United Kingdom) **McLaren-Ford***	27
2	5	(Italy) **Ferrari***	16

- Note: Only the top five positions are included for both sets of standings.
- Competitors in bold and marked with an asterisk still had a theoretical chance of becoming World Champion.

Previous race: 1970 British Grand Prix	FIA Formula One World Championship; 1970 season	Next race: 1970 Austrian Grand Prix
Previous race: 1969 German Grand Prix	German Grand Prix	Next race: 1971 German Grand Prix; Next race at the Hockenheimring: 1977 German Grand Prix
