= 1969 Dutch Grand Prix =

- Zandvoort original layout

Race details
- Date: June 21, 1969
- Official name: XVII Grote Prijs van Nederland
- Location: Circuit Zandvoort, Zandvoort, Netherlands
- Course: Permanent racing facility
- Course length: 4.193 km (2.605 miles)
- Distance: 90 laps, 377.370 km (234.487 miles)
- Weather: Sunny, mild, dry

Pole position
Driver	(Austria) Jochen Rindt	Lotus-Ford
- Time: 1:20.85

Fastest lap
Driver	(United Kingdom) Jackie Stewart	Matra-Ford
- Time: 1:22.94 on lap 5

Podium
First	(United Kingdom) Jackie Stewart	Matra-Ford
Second	(Switzerland) Jo Siffert	Lotus-Ford
Third	(New Zealand) Chris Amon	Ferrari

The 1969 Dutch Grand Prix was a Formula One motor race held at the Zandvoort Circuit on June 21, 1969. It was race 4 of 11 in both the 1969 World Championship of Drivers and the 1969 International Cup for Formula One Manufacturers. The 90-lap race was won by Matra driver Jackie Stewart after he started from second position. Jo Siffert finished second for the Lotus team and Ferrari driver Chris Amon came in third.

== Qualifying ==
=== Qualifying ===
Pos	No	Driver	Constructor	Time	Gap
1	2	(Austria) Jochen Rindt	Lotus-Ford	1:20.85	—
2	4	(United Kingdom) Jackie Stewart	Matra-Ford	1:21.14	+0.29
3	1T	(United Kingdom) Graham Hill	Lotus-Ford	1:22.01	+1.16
4	8	(New Zealand) Chris Amon	Ferrari	1:22.69	+1.84
5	12	(Belgium) Jacky Ickx	Brabham-Ford	1:22.85	+2.00
6	6	(New Zealand) Bruce McLaren	McLaren-Ford	1:22.87	+2.02
7	7	(New Zealand) Denny Hulme	McLaren-Ford	1:23.07	+2.22
8	11	(Australia) Jack Brabham	Brabham-Ford	1:23.10	+2.25
9	16	(United Kingdom) Piers Courage	Brabham-Ford	1:23.36	+2.51
10	10	(Switzerland) Jo Siffert	Lotus-Ford	1:23.94	+3.09
11	5	(France) Jean-Pierre Beltoise	Matra-Ford	1:24.44	+3.59
12	14	(United Kingdom) John Surtees	BRM	1:25.07	+4.22
13	15	(United Kingdom) Jackie Oliver	BRM	1:25.11	+4.26
14	17	(Switzerland) Silvio Moser	Brabham-Ford	1:26.50	+5.65
15	18	(United Kingdom) Vic Elford	McLaren-Ford	1:28.47	+7.62

== Race ==
=== Classification ===
Pos	No	Driver	Constructor	Laps	Time/Retired	Grid	Points
1	4	(United Kingdom) Jackie Stewart	Matra-Ford	90	2:06:42.08	2	9
2	10	(Switzerland) Jo Siffert	Lotus-Ford	90	+ 24.52	10	6
3	8	(New Zealand) Chris Amon	Ferrari	90	+ 30.51	4	4
4	7	(New Zealand) Denny Hulme	McLaren-Ford	90	+ 37.16	7	3
5	12	(Belgium) Jacky Ickx	Brabham-Ford	90	+ 37.67	5	2
6	11	(Australia) Jack Brabham	Brabham-Ford	90	+ 1:10.81	8	1
7	1	(United Kingdom) Graham Hill	Lotus-Ford	88	+ 2 laps	3	
8	5	(France) Jean-Pierre Beltoise	Matra-Ford	87	+ 3 Laps	11	
9	14	(United Kingdom) John Surtees	BRM	87	+ 3 Laps	12	
10	18	(United Kingdom) Vic Elford	McLaren-Ford	84	+ 6 Laps	15	
Ret	17	(Switzerland) Silvio Moser	Brabham-Ford	54	Ignition	14	
Ret	6	(New Zealand) Bruce McLaren	McLaren-Ford	24	Suspension	6	
Ret	2	(Austria) Jochen Rindt	Lotus-Ford	16	Halfshaft	1	
Ret	16	(United Kingdom) Piers Courage	Brabham-Ford	12	Clutch	9	
Ret	15	(United Kingdom) Jackie Oliver	BRM	9	Gearbox	13	

== Notes ==
- This race marked the 10th podium finish for French constructor Matra.

== Championship standings after the race ==
Drivers' Championship standings

	Pos	Driver	Points
	1	(United Kingdom) Jackie Stewart	27
	2	(United Kingdom) Graham Hill	15
2	3	(Switzerland) Jo Siffert	13
	4	(New Zealand) Denny Hulme	11
2	5	(New Zealand) Bruce McLaren	10

Constructors' Championship standings

	Pos	Constructor	Points
	1	(France) Matra-Ford	27
	2	(United Kingdom) Lotus-Ford	21
	3	(United Kingdom) McLaren-Ford	15
	4	(United Kingdom) Brabham-Ford	9
3	5	(Italy) Ferrari	4

- Note: Only the top five positions are included for both sets of standings.

Previous race: 1969 Monaco Grand Prix	FIA Formula One World Championship; 1969 season	Next race: 1969 French Grand Prix
Previous race: 1968 Dutch Grand Prix	Dutch Grand Prix	Next race: 1970 Dutch Grand Prix
