= 1970 Austrian Grand Prix =

- The Österreichring (in 1970)

Race details
- Date: 16 August 1970
- Official name: VIII Großer Preis von Österreich
- Location: Österreichring; Spielberg, Styria, Austria
- Course: Permanent racing facility
- Course length: 5.911 km (3.673 miles)
- Distance: 60 laps, 354.66 km (220.38 miles)

Pole position
Driver	(Austria) Jochen Rindt	Lotus-Ford
- Time: 1:39.23

Fastest lap
Driver	(Belgium) Jacky Ickx on lap 51 (Switzerland) Clay Regazzoni on lap 40	Ferrari; Ferrari
- Time: 1:40.4

Podium
First	(Belgium) Jacky Ickx	Ferrari
Second	(Switzerland) Clay Regazzoni	Ferrari
Third	(Germany) Rolf Stommelen	Brabham-Ford

The 1970 Austrian Grand Prix was a Formula One motor race held at the Österreichring on 16 August 1970. It was race 9 of 13 in both the 1970 World Championship of Drivers and the 1970 International Cup for Formula One Manufacturers. This was the third Austrian Grand Prix, the second as part of the World Championship, and the first at the scenic Österreichring, built to replace the bumpy and bland Zeltweg Airfield circuit.

The 60-lap race was won by Jacky Ickx, driving a Ferrari, after he started from third position. Teammate Clay Regazzoni achieved his first podium finish by coming second, while Rolf Stommelen achieved his only podium finish, coming third in a Brabham-Ford. Local driver and championship leader Jochen Rindt started from pole position in his Lotus-Ford, but retired with an engine failure. It would turn out to be Rindt's final Formula One Grand Prix race start.

== Qualifying ==
=== Qualifying classification ===
Pos	No	Driver	Constructor	Time	Gap	Grid
1	6	(Austria) Jochen Rindt	Lotus-Ford	1:39.23	—	1
2	27	(Switzerland) Clay Regazzoni	Ferrari	1:39.70	+0.47	2
3	12	(Belgium) Jacky Ickx	Ferrari	1:39.86	+0.63	3
4	1	(United Kingdom) Jackie Stewart	March-Ford	1:40.15	+0.92	4
5	14	(Italy) Ignazio Giunti	Ferrari	1:40.21	+0.98	5
6	4	(New Zealand) Chris Amon	March-Ford	1:40.60	+1.37	6
7	19	(France) Jean-Pierre Beltoise	Matra	1:40.81	+1.58	7
8	10	(Australia) Jack Brabham	Brabham-Ford	1:40.81	+1.58	8
9	2	(France) François Cevert	March-Ford	1:40.89	+1.66	9
10	7	(United Kingdom) John Miles	Lotus-Ford	1:41.46	+2.23	10
11	21	(New Zealand) Denny Hulme	McLaren-Ford	1:41.49	+2.26	11
12	15	(United Kingdom) John Surtees	Surtees-Ford	1:41.49	+2.26	12
13	20	(France) Henri Pescarolo	Matra	1:41.70	+2.47	13
14	16	(United Kingdom) Jackie Oliver	BRM	1:41.73	+2.50	14
15	22	(Italy) Andrea de Adamich	McLaren-Alfa Romeo	1:41.82	+2.59	15
16	8	(Brazil) Emerson Fittipaldi	Lotus-Ford	1:41.86	+2.63	16
17	11	(Germany) Rolf Stommelen	Brabham-Ford	1:42.09	+2.86	17
18	5	(United States) Mario Andretti	March-Ford	1:42.28	+3.05	18
19	26	(Australia) Tim Schenken	De Tomaso-Ford	1:42.41	+3.18	19
20	3	(Switzerland) Jo Siffert	March-Ford	1:42.56	+3.33	20
21	23	(United Kingdom) Peter Gethin	McLaren-Ford	1:42.79	+3.56	21
22	17	(Mexico) Pedro Rodríguez	BRM	1:43.19	+3.96	22
23	18	(Canada) George Eaton	BRM	1:45.00	+5.77	23
24	24	(Switzerland) Silvio Moser	Bellasi-Ford	1:45.64	+6.41	24

== Race ==
=== Classification ===
Pos	No	Driver	Constructor	Laps	Time/Retired	Grid	Points
1	12	(Belgium) Jacky Ickx	Ferrari	60	1:42:17.3	3	9
2	27	(Switzerland) Clay Regazzoni	Ferrari	60	+ 0.61	2	6
3	11	(Germany) Rolf Stommelen	Brabham-Ford	60	+ 1:27.88	17	4
4	17	(Mexico) Pedro Rodríguez	BRM	59	+ 1 Lap	22	3
5	16	(United Kingdom) Jackie Oliver	BRM	59	+ 1 Lap	14	2
6	19	(France) Jean-Pierre Beltoise	Matra	59	+ 1 Lap	7	1
7	14	(Italy) Ignazio Giunti	Ferrari	59	+ 1 Lap	5	
8	4	(New Zealand) Chris Amon	March-Ford	59	+ 1 Lap	6	
9	3	(Switzerland) Jo Siffert	March-Ford	59	+ 1 Lap	20	
10	23	(United Kingdom) Peter Gethin	McLaren-Ford	59	+ 1 Lap	21	
11	18	(Canada) George Eaton	BRM	58	+ 2 Laps	23	
12	22	(Italy) Andrea de Adamich	McLaren-Alfa Romeo	57	+ 3 Laps	15	
13	10	(Australia) Jack Brabham	Brabham-Ford	56	+ 4 Laps	8	
14	20	(France) Henri Pescarolo	Matra	56	+ 4 Laps	13	
15	8	(Brazil) Emerson Fittipaldi	Lotus-Ford	55	+ 5 Laps	16	
Ret	21	(New Zealand) Denny Hulme	McLaren-Ford	30	Engine	11	
Ret	15	(United Kingdom) John Surtees	Surtees-Ford	27	Engine	12	
Ret	26	(Australia) Tim Schenken	De Tomaso-Ford	25	Engine	19	
Ret	6	(Austria) Jochen Rindt	Lotus-Ford	21	Engine	1	
Ret	5	(United States) Mario Andretti	March-Ford	13	Accident	18	
Ret	24	(Switzerland) Silvio Moser	Bellasi-Ford	13	Radiator	24	
Ret	1	(United Kingdom) Jackie Stewart	March-Ford	7	Fuel Pipe	4	
Ret	7	(United Kingdom) John Miles	Lotus-Ford	4	Brakes	10	
Ret	2	(France) François Cevert	March-Ford	0	Engine	9	

== Notes ==
- This was the Formula One World Championship debut for Australian driver Tim Schenken.
- This was the 122nd race start for Jack Brabham, thereby setting a new record.

== Championship standings after the race ==
Drivers' Championship standings

	Pos	Driver	Points
	1	(Austria) **Jochen Rindt***	45
	2	(Australia) **Jack Brabham***	25
	3	(New Zealand) **Denny Hulme***	20
3	4	(Belgium) **Jacky Ickx***	19
1	5	(United Kingdom) **Jackie Stewart***	19

Constructors' Championship standings

Pos	Constructor	Points
1	(United Kingdom) **Lotus-Ford***	50
2	(United Kingdom) **March-Ford***	33
3	(United Kingdom) **Brabham-Ford***	33
4	(United Kingdom) **McLaren-Ford***	27
5	(Italy) **Ferrari***	25

- Note: Only the top five positions are included for both sets of standings.
- Competitors in bold and marked with an asterisk still had a theoretical chance of becoming World Champion.

Previous race: 1970 German Grand Prix	FIA Formula One World Championship; 1970 season	Next race: 1970 Italian Grand Prix
Previous race: 1964 Austrian Grand Prix	Austrian Grand Prix	Next race: 1971 Austrian Grand Prix
