= Bellasi =

Swiss-Italian motorsport company

Bellasi srl
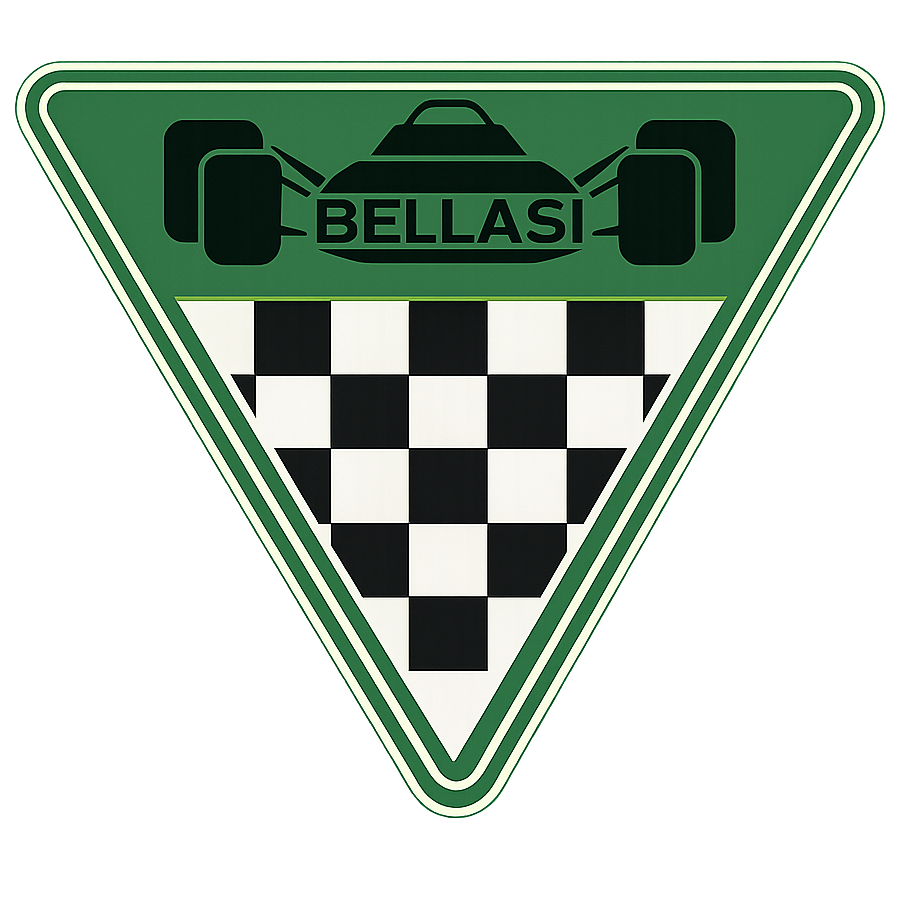
- Type: Private
- Industry: Automotive industry
- Founded: 1966
- Founder: Guglielmo Bellasi
- Headquarters: Novara, Italy
- Area served: Worldwide
- Key people: Roberto Bellasi (Chairman)
- Products: Motorsport technology
- Website: Bellasi.com

Bellasi as a Formula One chassis constructor
- Base: Italy
- Founder(s): Guglielmo Bellasi

Formula One World Championship career
- Engines: Cosworth V8
- Entrants: Silvio Moser Racing Team; Jolly Club Switzerland
- First entry: 1970 Dutch Grand Prix
- Last entry: 1971 Italian Grand Prix
- Races entered: 6 (2 starts)
- Race victories: 0
- Constructors' Championships: 0
- Drivers' Championships: 0
- Pole positions: 0
- Fastest laps: 0

Bellasi is a Swiss-Italian motorsport company specialized in manufacturing composite parts for racing cars. From 1970 to 1971 it was a Formula One constructor. They participated in six grands prix, entering a total of six cars.

Guglielmo Bellasi was one of several car manufacturers to try to establish themselves in Italian Formula 3 circles in the late 1960s. The first Bellasi F3 car appeared in 1966, entered by Scuderia Inter Corse and driven by Guglielmo Bellasi himself. This Ford-engined machine clearly had some potential as it finished third in the Circuito del Lago di Garda race a month later. Bellasi F3 cars appeared again in 1967 with Bellasi and Sandro Angeleri driving on occasional outings, but there was a more concerted effort in 1968 with Scuderia Jolly Club running as many as four cars for Angeleri, Pino Mariella, Franco Conti and others. The best result was a fifth place for Mariella in the Coppa Autodromo at Monza. Similar cars continued to be seen in 1969 with Georges Ferreira, Pino Pica and Giorgio Pianta among the drivers. One odd feature of the 1969 car was a rear-mounted water radiator, with the coolant warmed by the exhaust.

For 1970 Swiss racer Silvio Moser commissioned Bellasi to design a Grand Prix car for him. This Cosworth-powered device (using some components from the Brabham BT24-3 Moser had raced for the Silvio Moser Racing Team SA) featured a simple riveted aluminium monocoque with tubular sub-frame carrying the radiator and front suspension. The Bellasi was ready for the Dutch Grand Prix in June but failed to qualify there and again in France. The team did not bother to go to Britain because there was no starting money and there was another failure to qualify in Germany before Moser finally made it onto the grid at the 1970 Austrian Grand Prix. The car lasted 13 laps before breaking down and at Monza it was back to non-qualification. The car reappeared for the non-championship Argentine Grand Prix in 1971, entered by the Jolly Club. In September the car was entered again at the 1971 Italian Grand Prix and qualified but retired after only five laps.

In 1970 Moser won the St. Ursanne-Les Rangiers and the Kerenzerberg Hillclimb with the Bellasi F1.

== Complete Formula One World Championship results ==
(key)

| Year | Chassis | Engine | Tyres | Drivers | 1 | 2 | 3 | 4 | 5 | 6 | 7 | 8 | 9 | 10 | 11 | 12 | 13 | Points | WCC |
|---|---|---|---|---|---|---|---|---|---|---|---|---|---|---|---|---|---|---|---|
| 1970 | Bellasi F1 | Cosworth V8 | G | | RSA | ESP | MON | BEL | NED | FRA | GBR | GER | AUT | ITA | CAN | USA | MEX | 0 | NC |
| 1970 | Bellasi F1 | Cosworth V8 | G | (Switzerland) Silvio Moser | | | | | DNQ | DNQ | | DNQ | Ret | DNQ | | | | 0 | NC |
| 1971 | Bellasi F1 | Cosworth V8 | G | | RSA | ESP | MON | NED | FRA | GBR | GER | AUT | ITA | CAN | USA | | | 0 | NC |
| 1971 | Bellasi F1 | Cosworth V8 | G | (Switzerland) Silvio Moser | | | | | | | | | Ret | | | | | 0 | NC |
