= 1969 Italian Grand Prix =

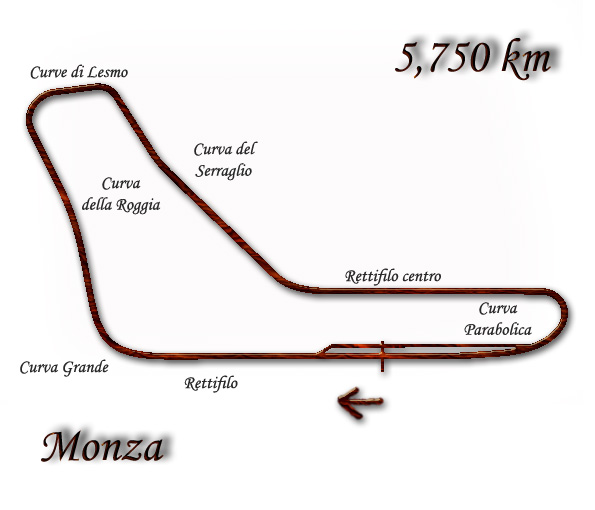

Race details
- Date: 7 September 1969
- Official name: XL Gran Premio d'Italia
- Location: Autodromo Nazionale di Monza, Monza, Italy
- Course: Permanent racing facility
- Course length: 5.750 km (3.573 miles)
- Distance: 68 laps, 391.000 km (242.956 miles)
- Weather: Sunny, Dry

Pole position
Driver	(Austria) Jochen Rindt	Lotus-Ford
- Time: 1:25.48

Fastest lap
Driver	(France) Jean-Pierre Beltoise	Matra-Ford
- Time: 1:25.2 on lap 64

Podium
First	(United Kingdom) Jackie Stewart	Matra-Ford
Second	(Austria) Jochen Rindt	Lotus-Ford
Third	(France) Jean-Pierre Beltoise	Matra-Ford

The 1969 Italian Grand Prix was a Formula One motor race held at the Autodromo Nazionale di Monza on 7 September 1969. It was race 8 of 11 in both the 1969 World Championship of Drivers and the 1969 International Cup for Formula One Manufacturers. The race was notable in that less than a fifth of a second separated the winner from the fourth-placed driver, and is one of the closest 1–2–3–4 finishes in Formula One history. Jackie Stewart and Matra-Ford claimed the Drivers' and Manufacturers' titles respectively, with three races still remaining.

== Classification ==
=== Qualifying ===
Pos	No	Driver	Constructor	Time	Gap
1	4	(Austria) Jochen Rindt	Lotus-Ford	1:25.48	—
2	16	(New Zealand) Denny Hulme	McLaren-Ford	1:25.69	+0.21
3	20	(United Kingdom) Jackie Stewart	Matra-Ford	1:25.82	+0.34
4	32	(United Kingdom) Piers Courage	Brabham-Ford	1:26.48	+1.00
5	18	(New Zealand) Bruce McLaren	McLaren-Ford	1:26.48	+1.00
6	22	(France) Jean-Pierre Beltoise	Matra-Ford	1:26.72	+1.24
7	28	(Australia) Jack Brabham	Brabham-Ford	1:26.90	+1.42
8	30	(Switzerland) Jo Siffert	Lotus-Ford	1:27.04	+1.56
9	2	(United Kingdom) Graham Hill	Lotus-Ford	1:27.31	+1.83
10	14	(United Kingdom) John Surtees	BRM	1:27.40	+1.92
11	12	(United Kingdom) Jackie Oliver	BRM	1:28.40	+2.92
12	10	(Mexico) Pedro Rodríguez	Ferrari	1:28.47	+2.99
13	36	(Switzerland) Silvio Moser	Brabham-Ford	1:28.51	+3.03
14	6	(United Kingdom) John Miles	Lotus-Ford	1:30.56	+5.08
15	10	(Italy) Ernesto Brambilla	Ferrari	1:30.86	+5.38
16	26	(Belgium) Jacky Ickx	Brabham-Ford	1:37.96	+12.48

=== Race ===
Pos	No	Driver	Constructor	Laps	Time/Retired	Grid	Points
1	20	(United Kingdom) Jackie Stewart	Matra-Ford	68	1:39:11.26	3	9
2	4	(Austria) Jochen Rindt	Lotus-Ford	68	+ 0.08	1	6
3	22	(France) Jean-Pierre Beltoise	Matra-Ford	68	+ 0.17	6	4
4	18	(New Zealand) Bruce McLaren	McLaren-Ford	68	+ 0.19	5	3
5	32	(United Kingdom) Piers Courage	Brabham-Ford	68	+ 33.44	4	2
6	10	(Mexico) Pedro Rodríguez	Ferrari	66	+ 2 laps	12	1
7	16	(New Zealand) Denny Hulme	McLaren-Ford	66	+ 2 laps	2	
8	30	(Switzerland) Jo Siffert	Lotus-Ford	64	Engine	8	
9	2	(United Kingdom) Graham Hill	Lotus-Ford	63	Halfshaft	9	
10	26	(Belgium) Jacky Ickx	Brabham-Ford	61	Out of fuel	15	
NC	14	(United Kingdom) John Surtees	BRM	60	+ 8 laps	10	
Ret	12	(United Kingdom) Jackie Oliver	BRM	48	Oil pressure	11	
Ret	36	(Switzerland) Silvio Moser	Brabham-Ford	9	Fuel leak	13	
Ret	28	(Australia) Jack Brabham	Brabham-Ford	6	Oil leak	7	
Ret	6	(United Kingdom) John Miles	Lotus-Ford	3	Engine	14	
DNS	10	(Italy) Ernesto Brambilla	Ferrari		Car raced by Rodríguez		

== Notes ==
- This was the 25th race for a Matra.
- This was the 49th pole position for Lotus, breaking the record set by Ferrari at the 1968 German Grand Prix.

== Championship standings after the race ==
- **Bold text** indicates the World Champions.

Drivers' Championship standings

	Pos	Driver	Points
	1	(United Kingdom) **Jackie Stewart**	60
1	2	(New Zealand) Bruce McLaren	24
1	3	(Belgium) Jacky Ickx	22
	4	(United Kingdom) Graham Hill	19
1	5	(France) Jean-Pierre Beltoise	16

Constructors' Championship standings

	Pos	Constructor	Points
	1	(France) **Matra-Ford**	60
1	2	(United Kingdom) Lotus-Ford	34
1	3	(United Kingdom) Brabham-Ford	30
	4	(United Kingdom) McLaren-Ford	27 (29)
	5	(Italy) Ferrari	5

- Note: Only the top five positions are included for both sets of standings. Only the best 5 results from the first 6 rounds and the best 4 results from the last 5 rounds counted towards the Championship. Numbers without parentheses are Championship points; numbers in parentheses are total points scored.

Previous race: 1969 German Grand Prix	FIA Formula One World Championship; 1969 season	Next race: 1969 Canadian Grand Prix
Previous race: 1968 Italian Grand Prix	Italian Grand Prix	Next race: 1970 Italian Grand Prix
