= 1968 Dutch Grand Prix =

- Zandvoort original layout

Race details
- Date: June 23, 1968
- Official name: XVI Grote Prijs van Nederland
- Location: Circuit Zandvoort, Zandvoort, Netherlands
- Course: Permanent racing facility
- Course length: 4.193 km (2.605 miles)
- Distance: 90 laps, 377.370 km (234.487 miles)
- Weather: Showers

Pole position
Driver	(New Zealand) Chris Amon	Ferrari
- Time: 1:23.54

Fastest lap
Driver	(France) Jean-Pierre Beltoise	Matra
- Time: 1:45.91 on lap 6

Podium
First	(United Kingdom) Jackie Stewart	Matra-Ford
Second	(France) Jean-Pierre Beltoise	Matra
Third	(Mexico) Pedro Rodríguez	BRM

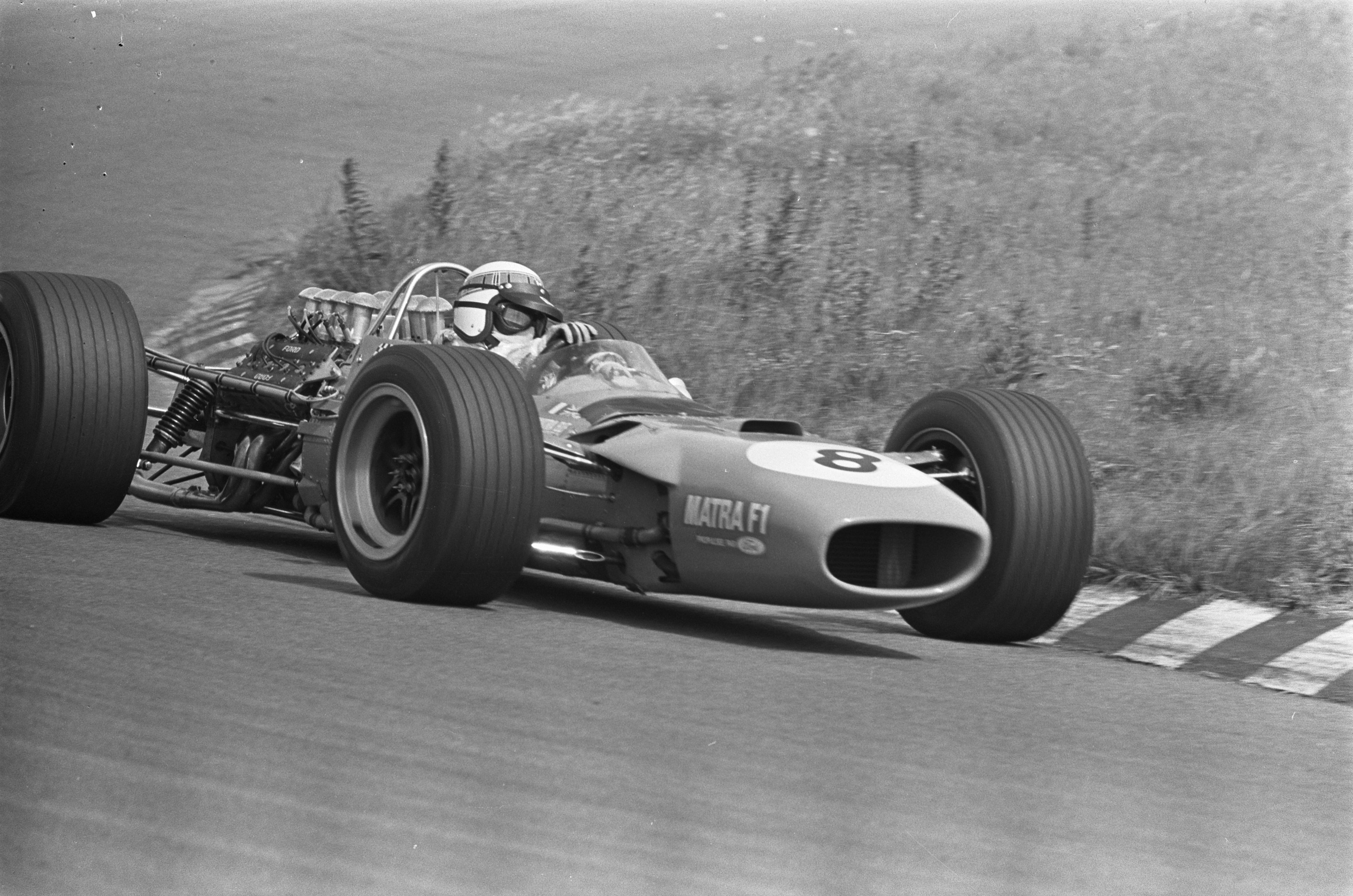
Race winner Jackie Stewart during the race

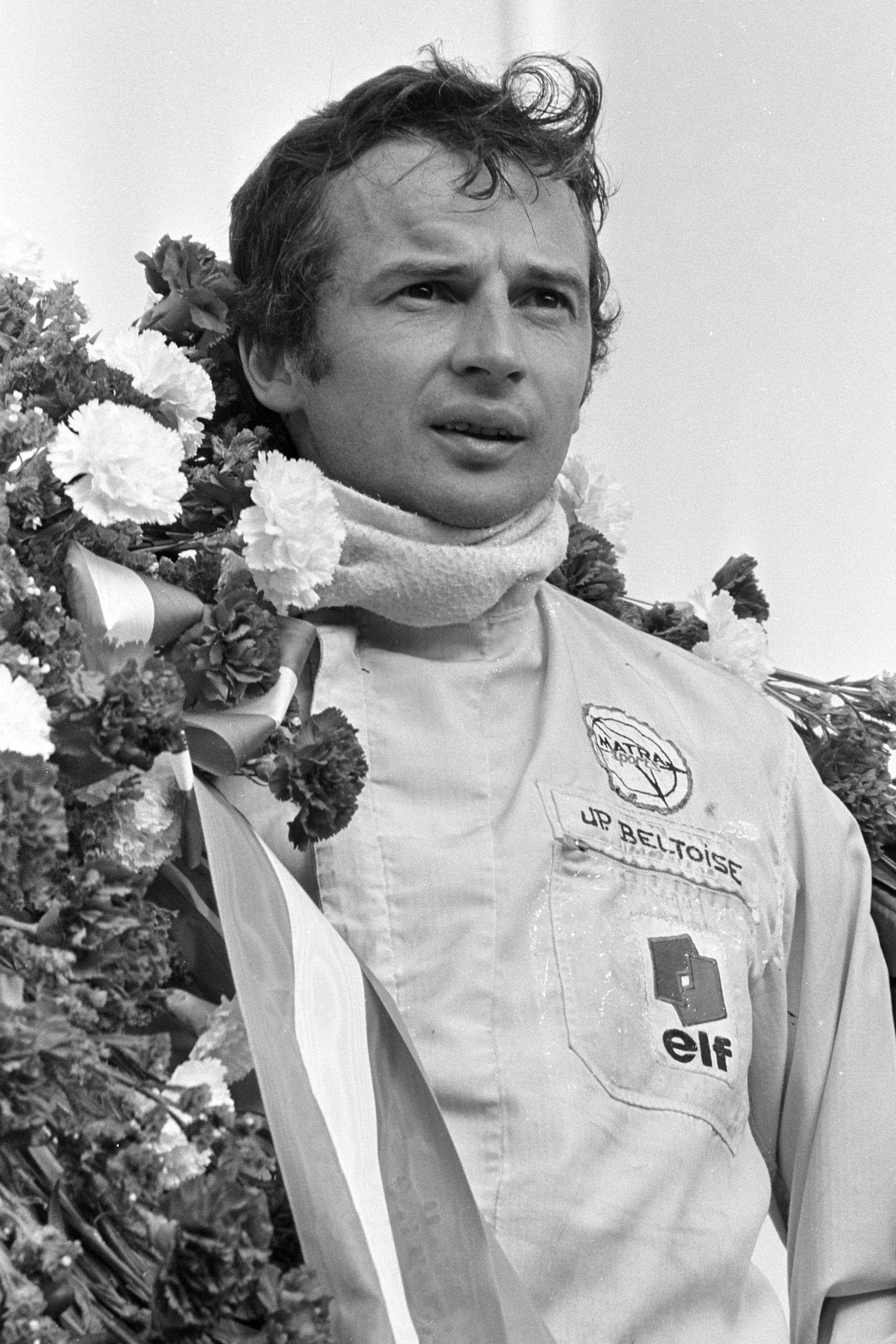
Second placed Jean-Pierre Beltoise on the winners' podium

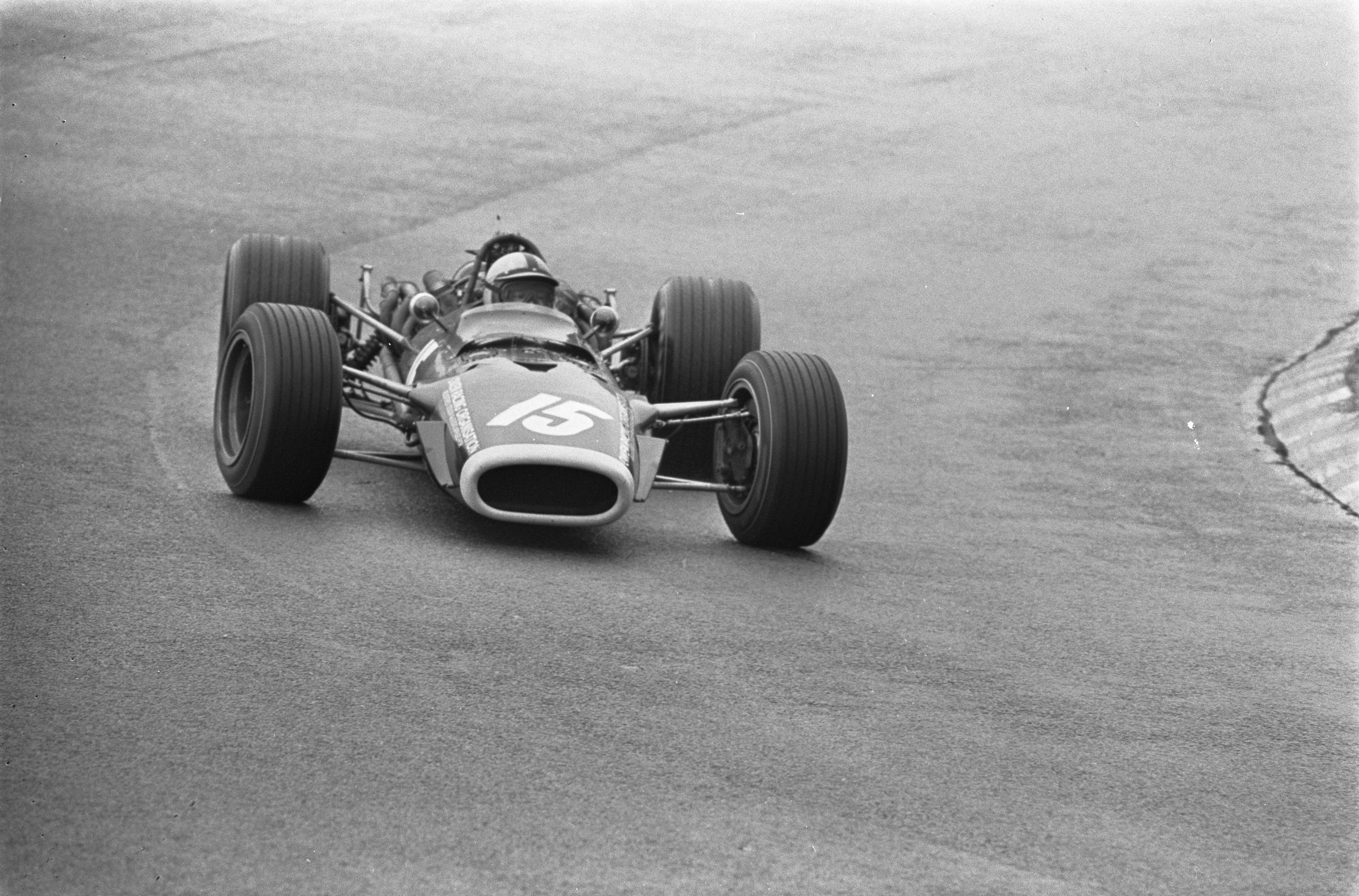
Third placed Pedro Rodríguez

The 1968 Dutch Grand Prix was a Formula One motor race held at the Zandvoort Circuit on 23 June 1968. It was race 5 of 12 in both the 1968 World Championship of Drivers and the 1968 International Cup for Formula One Manufacturers. The 90-lap race was won by Matra driver Jackie Stewart after he started from fifth position. His teammate Jean-Pierre Beltoise finished second and BRM driver Pedro Rodríguez came in third.

== Classification ==
=== Qualifying ===
Pos	No	Driver	Constructor	Time	Gap
1	9	(New Zealand) Chris Amon	Ferrari	1:23.54	—
2	6	(Austria) Jochen Rindt	Brabham-Repco	1:23.70	+0.16
3	3	(United Kingdom) Graham Hill	Lotus-Ford	1:23.84	+0.30
4	5	(Australia) Jack Brabham	Brabham-Repco	1:23.90	+0.36
5	8	(United Kingdom) Jackie Stewart	Matra-Ford	1:24.41	+0.87
6	10	(Belgium) Jacky Ickx	Ferrari	1:24.42	+0.88
7	1	(New Zealand) Denny Hulme	McLaren-Ford	1:24.45	+0.91
8	2	(New Zealand) Bruce McLaren	McLaren-Ford	1:24.58	+1.04
9	7	(United Kingdom) John Surtees	Honda	1:25.22	+1.68
10	4	(United Kingdom) Jackie Oliver	Lotus-Ford	1:25.48	+1.94
11	15	(Mexico) Pedro Rodríguez	BRM	1:25.51	+1.97
12	18	(United States) Dan Gurney	Brabham-Repco	1:25.79	+2.25
13	21	(Switzerland) Jo Siffert	Lotus-Ford	1:25.86	+2.32
14	20	(United Kingdom) Piers Courage	BRM	1:26.07	+2.53
15	16	(United Kingdom) Richard Attwood	BRM	1:26.72	+3.18
16	17	(France) Jean-Pierre Beltoise	Matra	1:26.76	+3.22
17	22	(Switzerland) Silvio Moser	Brabham-Repco	1:28.29	+4.75
18	14	(Belgium) Lucien Bianchi	Cooper-BRM	1:28.31	+4.77
19	19	(Sweden) Jo Bonnier	McLaren-BRM	1:28.43	+4.89

=== Race ===
Pos	No	Driver	Constructor	Laps	Time/Retired	Grid	Points
1	8	(United Kingdom) Jackie Stewart	Matra-Ford	90	2:46:11.2	5	9
2	17	(France) Jean-Pierre Beltoise	Matra	90	+ 1:33.93	16	6
3	15	(Mexico) Pedro Rodríguez	BRM	89	+ 1 lap	11	4
4	10	(Belgium) Jacky Ickx	Ferrari	88	+ 2 laps	6	3
5	22	(Switzerland) Silvio Moser	Brabham-Repco	87	+ 3 laps	17	2
6	9	(New Zealand) Chris Amon	Ferrari	85	+ 5 laps	1	1
7	16	(United Kingdom) Richard Attwood	BRM	85	+ 5 laps	15	
8	19	(Sweden) Jo Bonnier	McLaren-BRM	82	+ 8 laps	19	
9	3	(United Kingdom) Graham Hill	Lotus-Ford	81	Accident	3	
NC	4	(United Kingdom) Jackie Oliver	Lotus-Ford	80	+ 10 laps	10	
Ret	18	(United States) Dan Gurney	Brabham-Repco	63	Throttle	12	
Ret	21	(Switzerland) Jo Siffert	Lotus-Ford	55	Gearbox	13	
Ret	7	(United Kingdom) John Surtees	Honda	50	Alternator	9	
Ret	20	(United Kingdom) Piers Courage	BRM	50	Spun off	14	
Ret	6	(Austria) Jochen Rindt	Brabham-Repco	39	Ignition	2	
Ret	5	(Australia) Jack Brabham	Brabham-Repco	22	Spun off	4	
Ret	2	(New Zealand) Bruce McLaren	McLaren-Ford	19	Accident	8	
Ret	1	(New Zealand) Denny Hulme	McLaren-Ford	10	Ignition	7	
Ret	14	(Belgium) Lucien Bianchi	Cooper-BRM	9	Accident	18	

== Notes ==
- This was the first win for a French constructor in Formula One.

== Championship standings after the race ==
Drivers' Championship standings

	Pos	Driver	Points
	1	(United Kingdom) Graham Hill	24
11	2	(United Kingdom) Jackie Stewart	12
2	3	(Mexico) Pedro Rodríguez	10
2	4	(New Zealand) Denny Hulme	10
2	5	(New Zealand) Bruce McLaren	9

Constructors' Championship standings

	Pos	Constructor	Points
	1	(United Kingdom) Lotus-Ford	29
	2	(United Kingdom) McLaren-Ford	17
	3	(United Kingdom) BRM	16
2	4	(France) Matra-Ford	15
	5	(Italy) Ferrari	10

- Note: Only the top five positions are included for both sets of standings.

Previous race: 1968 Belgian Grand Prix	FIA Formula One World Championship; 1968 season	Next race: 1968 French Grand Prix
Previous race: 1967 Dutch Grand Prix	Dutch Grand Prix	Next race: 1969 Dutch Grand Prix
