= 1969 French Grand Prix =

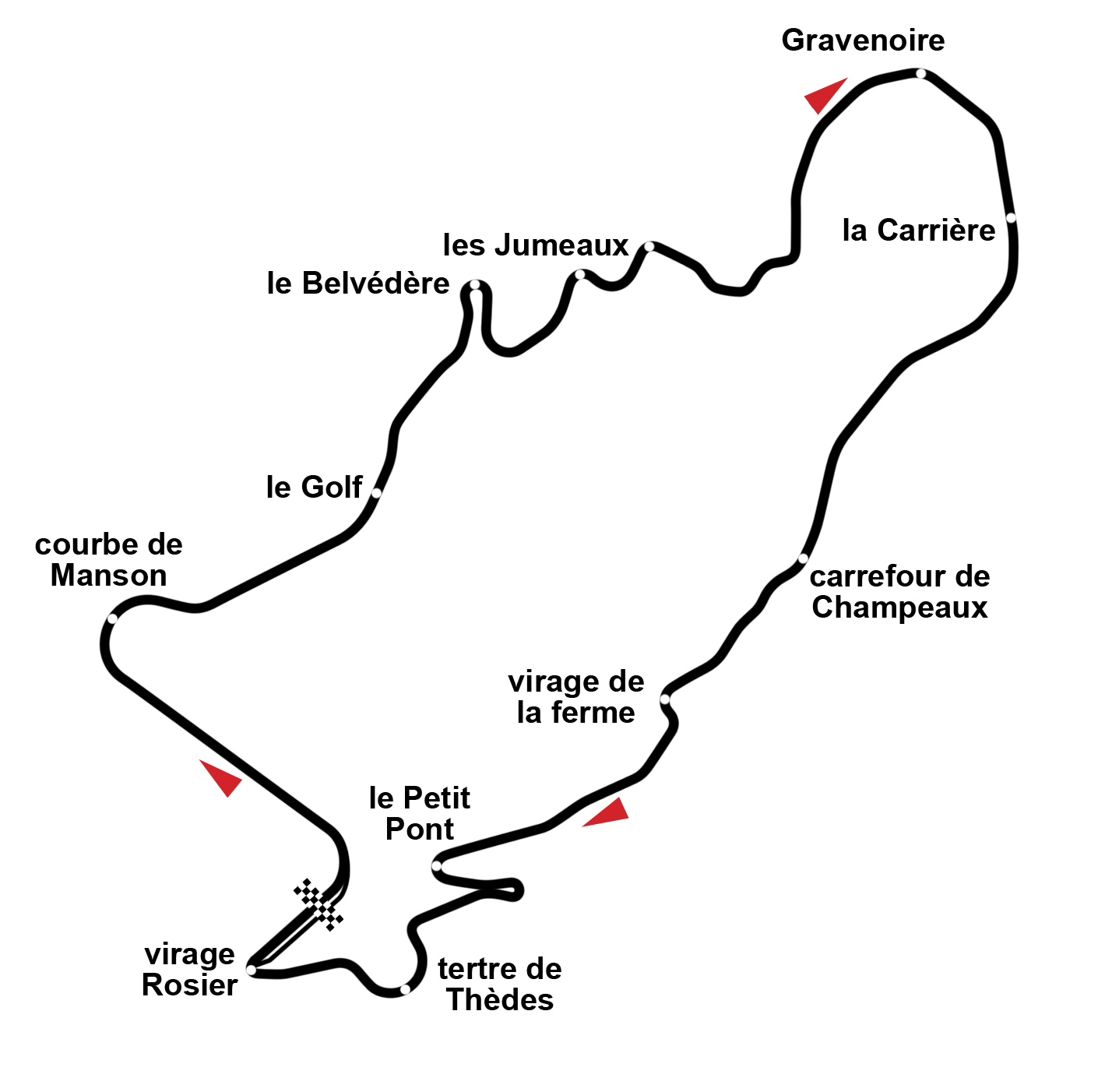
- The Charade Circuit (1958-1988)

Race details
- Date: 6 July 1969
- Official name: LV Grand Prix de France
- Location: Charade Circuit, Clermont-Ferrand, Auvergne, France
- Course: Permanent racing facility
- Course length: 8.055 km (5.005 miles)
- Distance: 38 laps, 306.090 km (190.196 miles)
- Weather: Sunny, mild, dry

Pole position
Driver	(United Kingdom) Jackie Stewart	Matra-Ford
- Time: 3:00.6

Fastest lap
Driver	(United Kingdom) Jackie Stewart	Matra-Ford
- Time: 3:02.7 on lap 27

Podium
First	(United Kingdom) Jackie Stewart	Matra-Ford
Second	(France) Jean-Pierre Beltoise	Matra-Ford
Third	(Belgium) Jacky Ickx	Brabham-Ford

The 1969 French Grand Prix was a Formula One motor race held at the Charade Circuit on 6 July 1969. It was race 5 of 11 in both the 1969 World Championship of Drivers and the 1969 International Cup for Formula One Manufacturers. There were only thirteen entries for this Grand Prix. The 38-lap race was won by Matra driver Jackie Stewart after he started from pole position. His teammate Jean-Pierre Beltoise finished second and Brabham driver Jacky Ickx came in third.

== Classification ==
=== Qualifying ===
Pos	No	Driver	Constructor	Time	Gap
1	2	(United Kingdom) Jackie Stewart	Matra-Ford	3:00.6	—
2	4	(New Zealand) Denny Hulme	McLaren-Ford	3:02.4	+1.8
3	15	(Austria) Jochen Rindt	Lotus-Ford	3:02.5	+1.9
4	11	(Belgium) Jacky Ickx	Brabham-Ford	3:02.6	+2.0
5	7	(France) Jean-Pierre Beltoise	Matra-Ford	3:02.9	+2.3
6	6	(New Zealand) Chris Amon	Ferrari	3:04.2	+3.6
7	5	(New Zealand) Bruce McLaren	McLaren-Ford	3:05.5	+4.9
8	1	(United Kingdom) Graham Hill	Lotus-Ford	3:05.9	+5.3
9	3	(Switzerland) Jo Siffert	Lotus-Ford	3:06.3	+5.7
10	10	(United Kingdom) Vic Elford	McLaren-Ford	3:08.0	+7.4
11	9	(United Kingdom) Piers Courage	Brabham-Ford	3:09.9	+9.3
12	14	(United Kingdom) John Miles	Lotus-Ford	3:12.8	+12.2
13	12	(Switzerland) Silvio Moser	Brabham-Ford	3:14.6	+14.0

=== Race ===
Pos	No	Driver	Constructor	Laps	Time/Retired	Grid	Points
1	2	(United Kingdom) Jackie Stewart	Matra-Ford	38	1:56:47.4	1	9
2	7	(France) Jean-Pierre Beltoise	Matra-Ford	38	+ 57.1	5	6
3	11	(Belgium) Jacky Ickx	Brabham-Ford	38	+ 57.3	4	4
4	5	(New Zealand) Bruce McLaren	McLaren-Ford	37	+ 1 Lap	7	3
5	10	(United Kingdom) Vic Elford	McLaren-Ford	37	+ 1 Lap	10	2
6	1	(United Kingdom) Graham Hill	Lotus-Ford	37	+ 1 Lap	8	1
7	12	(Switzerland) Silvio Moser	Brabham-Ford	36	+ 2 Laps	13	
8	4	(New Zealand) Denny Hulme	McLaren-Ford	35	+ 3 Laps	2	
9	3	(Switzerland) Jo Siffert	Lotus-Ford	34	+ 4 Laps	9	
Ret	6	(New Zealand) Chris Amon	Ferrari	30	Engine	6	
Ret	15	(Austria) Jochen Rindt	Lotus-Ford	22	Physical	3	
Ret	9	(United Kingdom) Piers Courage	Brabham-Ford	21	Chassis	11	
Ret	14	(United Kingdom) John Miles	Lotus-Ford	1	Fuel Pump	12	

== Notes ==
- This was the Formula One World Championship debut for British driver John Miles.
- This race marked the 100th participation of a New Zealand driver. In those 100 races, New Zealanders had won 8 Grands Prix, achieved 46 podium finishes, 3 pole positions, 6 fastest laps and had won 1 World Championship.
- This race saw the 10th podium finish for a Belgian driver.

== Championship standings after the race ==
Drivers' Championship standings

	Pos	Driver	Points
	1	(United Kingdom) Jackie Stewart	36
	2	(United Kingdom) Graham Hill	16
	3	(Switzerland) Jo Siffert	13
1	4	(New Zealand) Bruce McLaren	13
2	5	(France) Jean-Pierre Beltoise	11

Constructors' Championship standings

Pos	Constructor	Points
1	(France) Matra-Ford	36
2	(United Kingdom) Lotus-Ford	22
3	(United Kingdom) McLaren-Ford	18
4	(United Kingdom) Brabham-Ford	13
5	(Italy) Ferrari	4

- Note: Only the top five positions are included for both sets of standings.

Previous race: 1969 Dutch Grand Prix	FIA Formula One World Championship; 1969 season	Next race: 1969 British Grand Prix
Previous race: 1968 French Grand Prix	French Grand Prix	Next race: 1970 French Grand Prix
