= 1970 French Grand Prix =

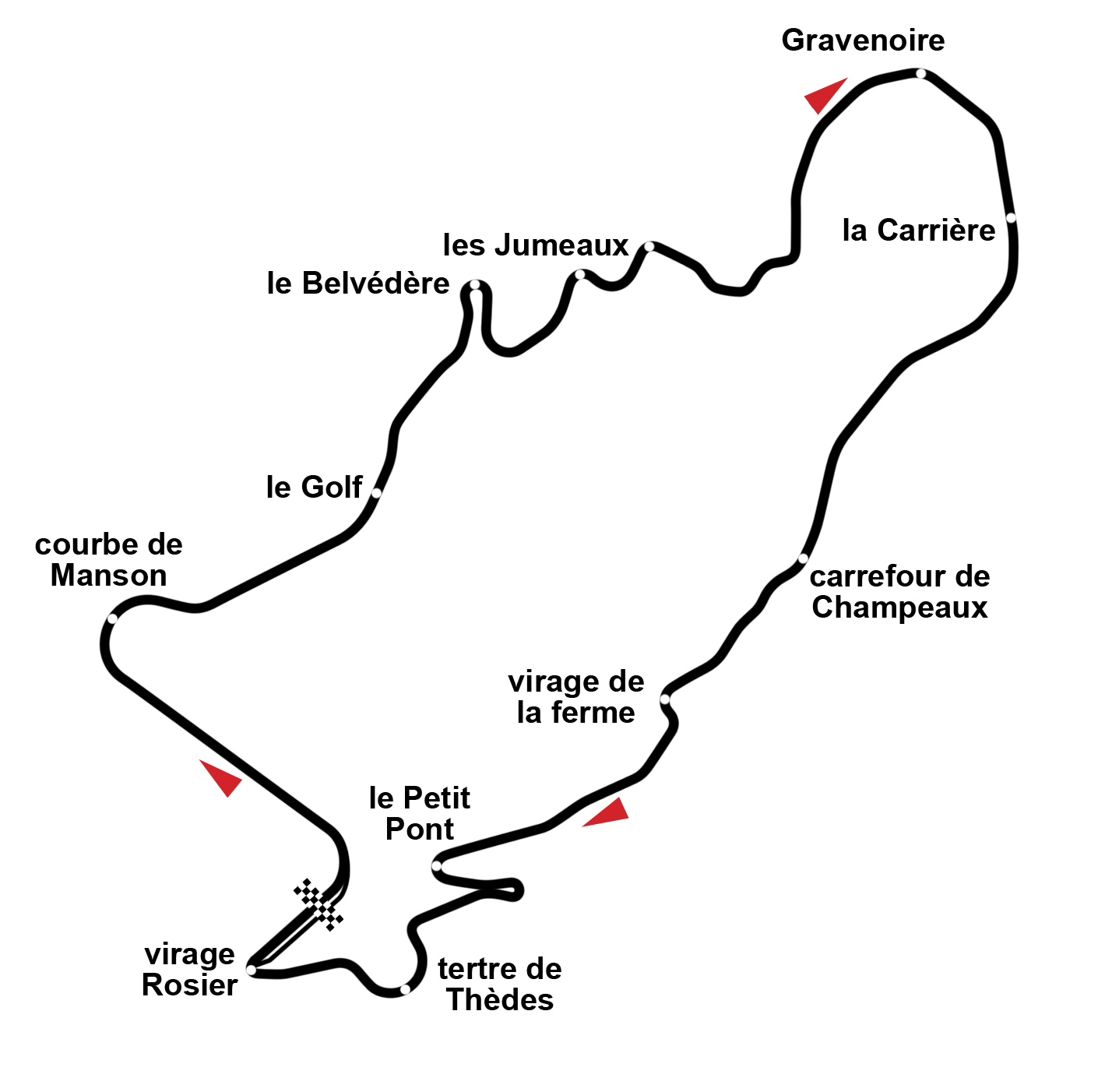
- The Circuit de Charade (1958-1988)

Race details
- Date: 5 July 1970
- Official name: LVI Grand Prix de France
- Location: Circuit de Charade; Clermont-Ferrand, Auvergne, France
- Course: Permanent racing facility
- Course length: 8.055 km (5.005 miles)
- Distance: 38 laps, 306.090 km (190.196 miles)
- Weather: Overcast

Pole position
Driver	(Belgium) Jacky Ickx	Ferrari
- Time: 2:58.22

Fastest lap
Driver	(Australia) Jack Brabham	Brabham-Ford
- Time: 3:00.75 on lap 29

Podium
First	(Austria) Jochen Rindt	Lotus-Ford
Second	(New Zealand) Chris Amon	March-Ford
Third	(Australia) Jack Brabham	Brabham-Ford

The 1970 French Grand Prix was a Formula One motor race held at the Circuit de Charade, Clermont-Ferrand on 5 July 1970. It was race 6 of 13 in both the 1970 World Championship of Drivers and the 1970 International Cup for Formula One Manufacturers. This was the third French Grand Prix to be held at the Circuit de Charade and the second in succession, after plans to hold the race at the Circuit d'Albi near Toulouse fell through.

The 38-lap race was won by Lotus driver Jochen Rindt after he started from sixth position. Chris Amon finished second for the March team and Brabham driver Jack Brabham came in third.

== Qualifying ==
=== Qualifying classification ===
Pos.	Driver	Constructor	Time	Grid
1	(Belgium) Jacky Ickx	Ferrari	2:58.22	1
2	(France) Jean-Pierre Beltoise	Matra	2:58.70	2
3	(New Zealand) Chris Amon	March-Ford	2:59.14	3
4	(United Kingdom) Jackie Stewart	March-Ford	2:59.24	4
5	(Australia) Jack Brabham	Brabham-Ford	2:59.67	5
6	(Austria) Jochen Rindt	Lotus-Ford	2:59.74	6
7	(New Zealand) Denny Hulme	McLaren-Ford	3:00.42	7
8	(France) Henri Pescarolo	Matra	3:00.59	8
9	(Sweden) Ronnie Peterson	March-Ford	3:01.21	9
10	(Mexico) Pedro Rodríguez	BRM	3:01.29	10
11	(Italy) Ignazio Giunti	Ferrari	3:01.85	11
12	(United Kingdom) Jackie Oliver	BRM	3:02.77	12
13	(France) François Cevert	March-Ford	3:02.87	13
14	(Germany) Rolf Stommelen	Brabham-Ford	3:03.41	14
15	(Italy) Andrea de Adamich	McLaren-Alfa Romeo	3:03.48	15
16	(Switzerland) Jo Siffert	March-Ford	3:03.78	16
17	(United States) Dan Gurney	McLaren-Ford	3:04.04	17
18	(United Kingdom) John Miles	Lotus-Ford	3:04.16	18
19	(Canada) George Eaton	BRM	3:04.92	19
20	(United Kingdom) Graham Hill	Lotus-Ford	3:07.84	20
DNQ	(Switzerland) Silvio Moser	Bellasi-Ford	3:08.10	—
DNQ	(Spain) Alex Soler-Roig	Lotus-Ford	3:14.49	—
DNQ	(United States) Pete Lovely	Lotus-Ford	3:15.58	—

== Race ==
=== Classification ===
Pos	No	Driver	Constructor	Laps	Time/Retired	Grid	Points
1	6	(Austria) Jochen Rindt	Lotus-Ford	38	1:55:57.0	6	9
2	14	(New Zealand) Chris Amon	March-Ford	38	+ 7.61	3	6
3	23	(Australia) Jack Brabham	Brabham-Ford	38	+ 44.83	5	4
4	19	(New Zealand) Denny Hulme	McLaren-Ford	38	+ 45.66	7	3
5	20	(France) Henri Pescarolo	Matra	38	+ 1:19.42	8	2
6	17	(United States) Dan Gurney	McLaren-Ford	38	+ 1:19.65	17	1
7	22	(Germany) Rolf Stommelen	Brabham-Ford	38	+ 2:20.16	14	
8	7	(United Kingdom) John Miles	Lotus-Ford	38	+ 2:47.17	18	
9	1	(United Kingdom) Jackie Stewart	March-Ford	38	+ 3:09.61	4	
10	8	(United Kingdom) Graham Hill	Lotus-Ford	37	+ 1 Lap	20	
11	2	(France) François Cevert	March-Ford	37	+ 1 Lap	13	
12	4	(Canada) George Eaton	BRM	36	+ 2 Laps	19	
13	21	(France) Jean-Pierre Beltoise	Matra	35	Out of Fuel	2	
14	11	(Italy) Ignazio Giunti	Ferrari	35	+ 3 Laps	11	
NC	16	(Italy) Andrea de Adamich	McLaren-Alfa Romeo	29	+ 9 Laps	15	
Ret	12	(Switzerland) Jo Siffert	March-Ford	23	Accident	16	
Ret	18	(Sweden) Ronnie Peterson	March-Ford	17	Differential	9	
Ret	10	(Belgium) Jacky Ickx	Ferrari	16	Engine	1	
Ret	3	(Mexico) Pedro Rodríguez	BRM	6	Gearbox	10	
Ret	5	(United Kingdom) Jackie Oliver	BRM	5	Engine	12	
DNQ	24	(Switzerland) Silvio Moser	Bellasi-Ford				
DNQ	9	(Spain) Alex Soler-Roig	Lotus-Ford				
DNQ	25	(United States) Pete Lovely	Lotus-Ford				

== Notes ==
- This was the last F1 race to be held on public roads with no Armco lined around the circuit. When F1 returned to the Charade circuit in 1972, Armco had already been installed there.
- Last Points: Dan Gurney
- For the first time since the 1968 Canadian Grand Prix, a Ford-powered car did not start on pole position. This race ended a record streak of 18 consecutive pole positions for Ford-Cosworth-powered cars.

== Championship standings after the race ==
Drivers' Championship standings

	Pos	Driver	Points
1	1	(Austria) Jochen Rindt	27
1	2	(United Kingdom) Jackie Stewart	19
	3	(Australia) Jack Brabham	19
3	4	(New Zealand) Chris Amon	12
	5	(New Zealand) Denny Hulme	12

Constructors' Championship standings

	Pos	Constructor	Points
1	1	(United Kingdom) Lotus-Ford	32
1	2	(United Kingdom) March-Ford	31
	3	(United Kingdom) Brabham-Ford	21
	4	(United Kingdom) McLaren-Ford	19
	5	(France) Matra	15

- Note: Only the top five positions are included for both sets of standings.

Previous race: 1970 Dutch Grand Prix	FIA Formula One World Championship; 1970 season	Next race: 1970 British Grand Prix
Previous race: 1969 French Grand Prix	French Grand Prix	Next race: 1971 French Grand Prix
