= 1970 Dutch Grand Prix =

- Zandvoort original layout

Race details
- Date: June 21, 1970
- Official name: XVIII Grote Prijs van Nederland
- Location: Circuit Zandvoort, Zandvoort, Netherlands
- Course: Permanent racing facility
- Course length: 4.193 km (2.605 miles)
- Distance: 90 laps, 377.370 km (234.487 miles)
- Weather: Cloudy

Pole position
Driver	(Austria) Jochen Rindt	Lotus-Ford
- Time: 1:18.5

Fastest lap
Driver	(Belgium) Jacky Ickx	Ferrari
- Time: 1:19.23 on lap 22

Podium
First	(Austria) Jochen Rindt	Lotus-Ford
Second	(United Kingdom) Jackie Stewart	March-Ford
Third	(Belgium) Jacky Ickx	Ferrari

The 1970 Dutch Grand Prix was a Formula One motor race held at Zandvoort on June 21, 1970. It was race 5 of 13 in both the 1970 World Championship of Drivers and the 1970 International Cup for Formula One Manufacturers. This race was held the same day as the 1970 FIFA World Cup Final in Mexico City, Mexico, but that event took place later in the day from this Grand Prix.

The race was won by Lotus-Ford driver Jochen Rindt in his new monocoque-chassis Type 72, a radical wedge shape first used on the 1968 Indianapolis Lotus, with inboard braking and torsion bar suspension, it represented a major technical advance, giving the driver superior ride and vision in a better ventilated seat. Rindt had only raced the car twice before (but in a different spec) and had preferred his old Lotus 49 in the preceding Monaco and Belgian rounds of the World Championship. Three years earlier the 72's predecessor; DFV-debutant Type 49 won in 1967 won first time out at exactly the same track with Jim Clark driving. Rindt, who opted to race the 72 without the complex anti-squat and anti-dive features, which he had never believed in, effortlessly dominated the practice and race putting little pressure on the car and not even having to use the maximum road width or line. The race also saw the debut of Clay Regazzoni with Ferrari, who finished fourth.

== Race report ==
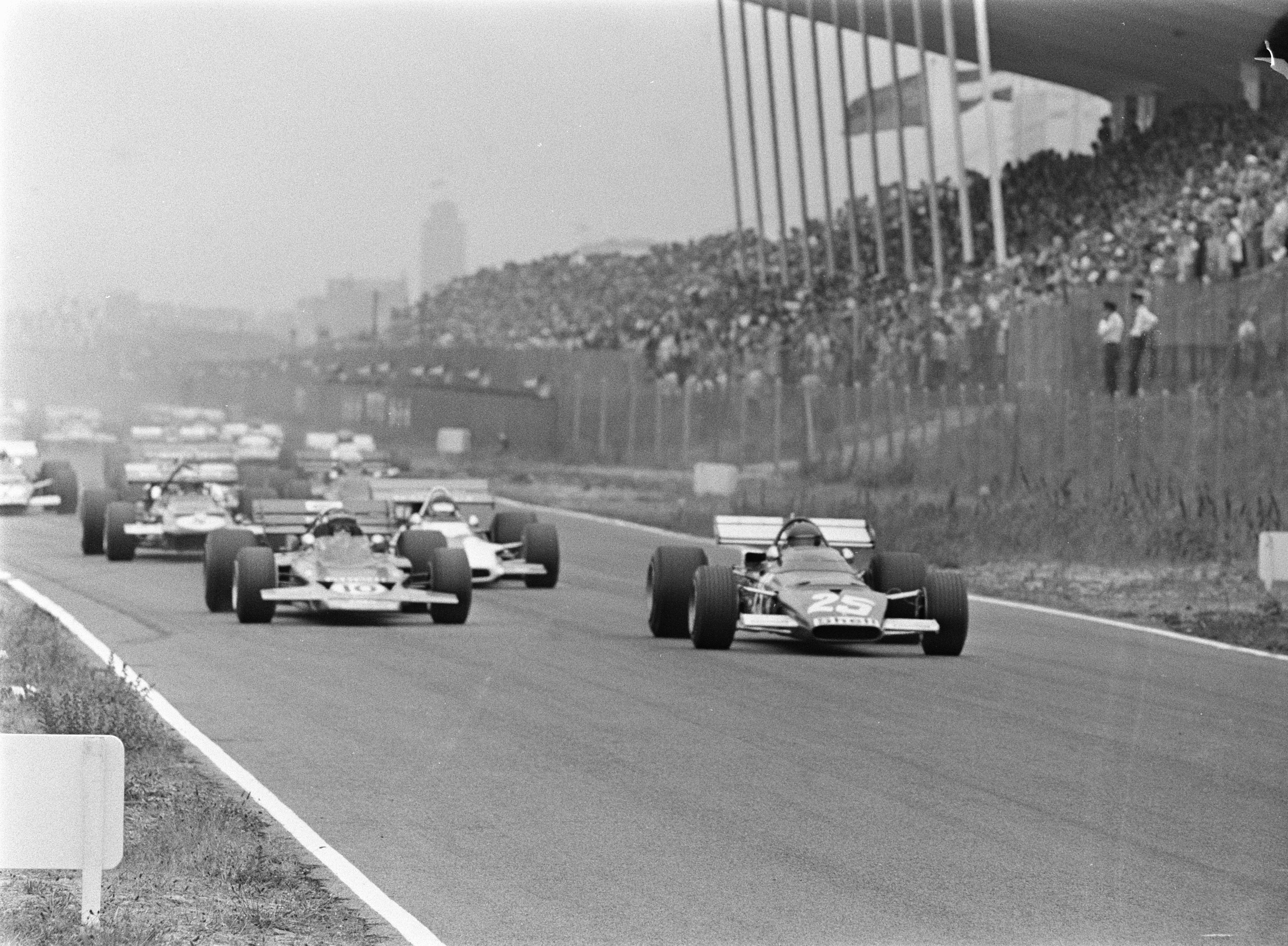
Jochen Rindt ahead of Jacky Ickx at the race start

Jacky Ickx led Jochen Rindt off the line. On lap 2, Rindt running on full tanks, with 50–55 gallons of petrol on board, put in his fastest lap of the race and outbraked Ickx into the Tarzan hairpin, on the inside in a classic passing manoeuvre, at the start of lap 3. Colin Chapman had persisted with anti-squat and dive on John Miles' Lotus 72 which was fifth on the first lap and proved difficult to pass. This assisted Team Lotus as it was much easier for Rindt to thread past the four car duel for fifth on lap 29–32 than for Ickx or Jackie Stewart who spent 7 laps getting past Jack Brabham, Jean-Pierre Beltoise, John Surtees and Miles Miles in the second 72 was finally being passed by Beltoise on lap 49, when a large wave over the coast dunes saw Miles lose adhesion and Surtees did finally claim the 6th place and the final point by passing John Miles' Lotus, which was brakeless by then, 4 laps from the flag. However the race was marred by the violent fatal accident of British driver Piers Courage driving the Frank Williams-entered De Tomaso-Ford on lap 22, at Tunnel Oost, when his car's suspension was damaged after hitting a curb, and the car went straight up a grass embankment. It then somersaulted and exploded, and Courage had died instantly after being hit on the head by one of the car's front wheels. The flames were so intense, that trees surrounding the accident site, were lit up as a result. A similar accident occurred at the 1973 race, which claimed the life of Roger Williamson.

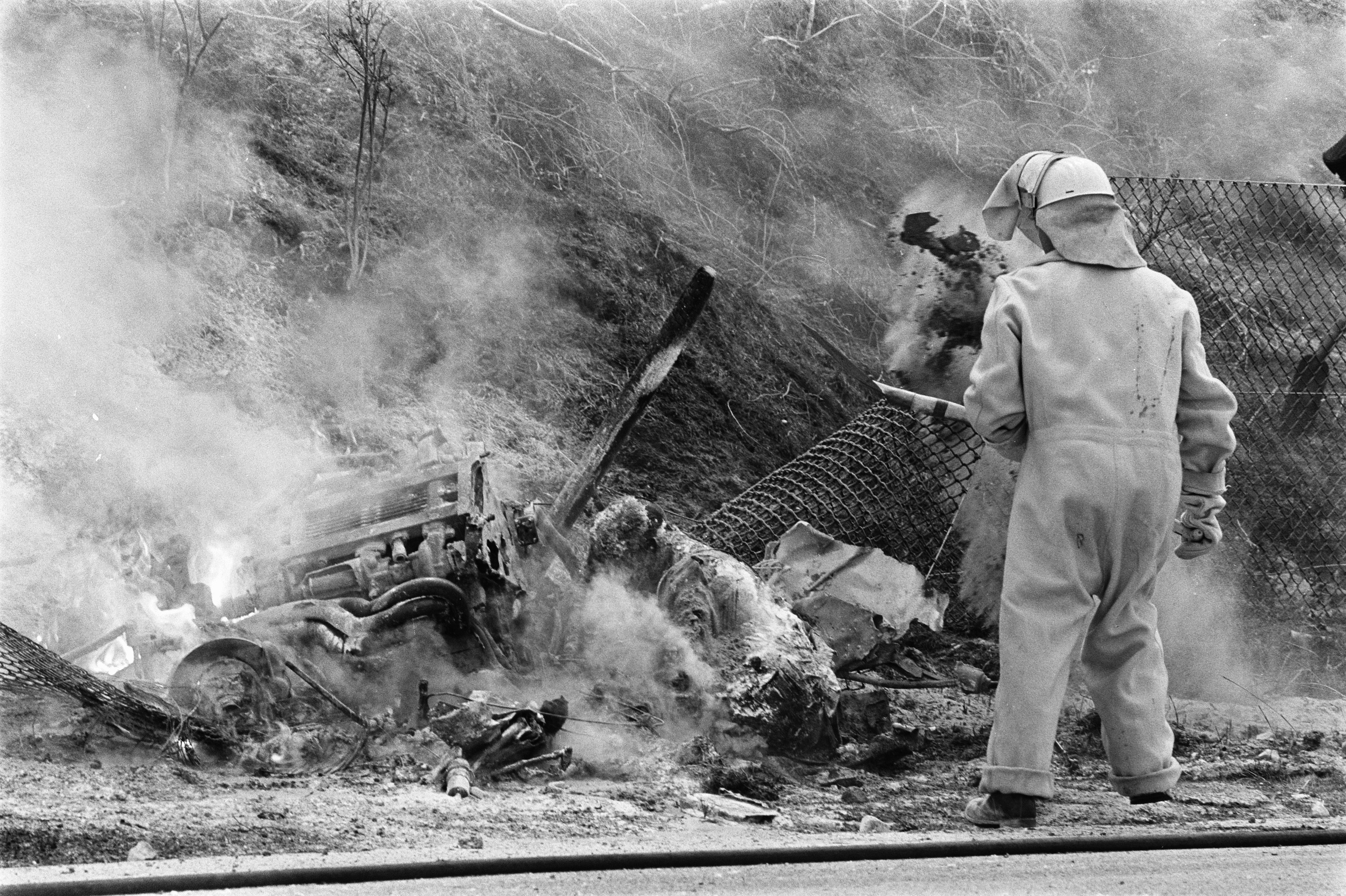
Courage's fatal accident

== Qualifying classification ==
Pos.	Driver	Constructor	Time	Grid
1	(Austria) Jochen Rindt	Lotus-Ford	1:18.50	1
2	(United Kingdom) Jackie Stewart	March-Ford	1:18.73	2
3	(Belgium) Jacky Ickx	Ferrari	1:18.93	3
4	(New Zealand) Chris Amon	March-Ford	1:19.25	4
5	(United Kingdom) Jackie Oliver	BRM	1:19.30	5
6	(Switzerland) Clay Regazzoni	Ferrari	1:19.48	6
7	(Mexico) Pedro Rodríguez	BRM	1:20.07	7
8	(United Kingdom) John Miles	Lotus-Ford	1:20.24	8
9	(United Kingdom) Piers Courage	De Tomaso-Ford	1:20.32	9
10	(France) Jean-Pierre Beltoise	Matra	1:20.38	10
11	(United Kingdom) Peter Gethin	McLaren-Ford	1:20.41	11
12	(Australia) Jack Brabham	Brabham-Ford	1:20.76	12
13	(France) Henri Pescarolo	Matra	1:20.89	13
14	(United Kingdom) John Surtees	McLaren-Ford	1:21.18	14
15	(France) François Cevert	March-Ford	1:21.18	15
16	(Sweden) Ronnie Peterson	March-Ford	1:21.24	16
17	(Switzerland) Jo Siffert	March-Ford	1:21.27	17
18	(Canada) George Eaton	BRM	1:21.35	18
19	(United States) Dan Gurney	McLaren-Ford	1:21.36	19
DNQ	(Italy) Andrea de Adamich	McLaren-Alfa Romeo	1:21.36	—
21	(United Kingdom) Graham Hill	Lotus-Ford	1:21.75	20
DNQ	(Germany) Rolf Stommelen	Brabham-Ford	1:22.34	—
DNQ	(United States) Pete Lovely	Lotus-Ford	1:23.37	—
DNQ	(Switzerland) Silvio Moser	Bellasi-Ford	1:24.29	—

== Race classification ==
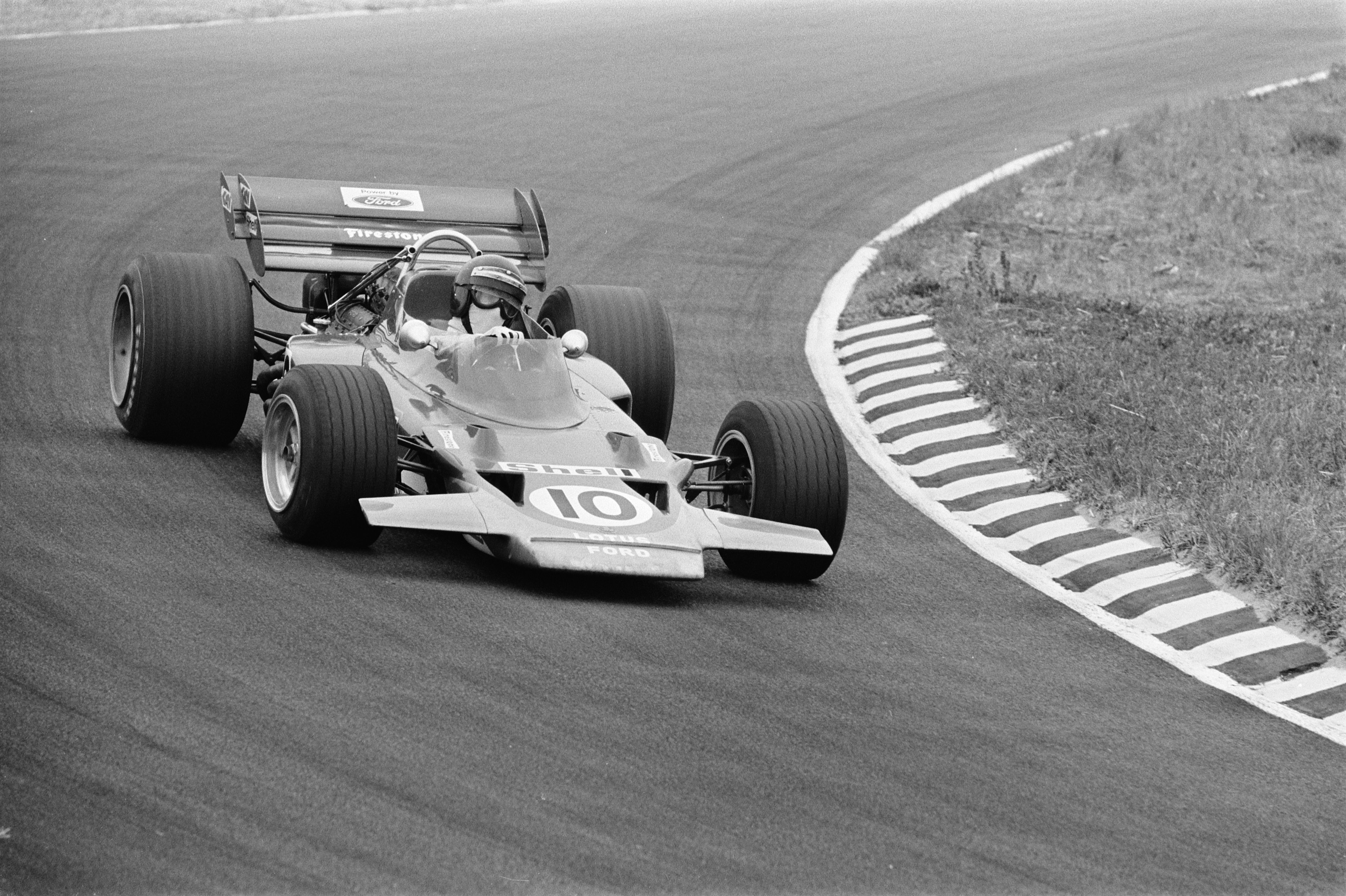
Jochen Rindt took the maiden victory for the revolutionary Lotus 72.

Pos	No	Driver	Constructor	Laps	Time/Retired	Grid	Points
1	10	(Austria) Jochen Rindt	Lotus-Ford	80	1:50:43.41	1	9
2	5	(United Kingdom) Jackie Stewart	March-Ford	80	+ 30.00	2	6
3	25	(Belgium) Jacky Ickx	Ferrari	79	+ 1 lap	3	4
4	26	(Switzerland) Clay Regazzoni	Ferrari	79	+ 1 lap	6	3
5	23	(France) Jean-Pierre Beltoise	Matra	79	+ 1 lap	10	2
6	16	(United Kingdom) John Surtees	McLaren-Ford	79	+ 1 lap	14	1
7	12	(United Kingdom) John Miles	Lotus-Ford	78	+ 2 laps	8	
8	24	(France) Henri Pescarolo	Matra	78	+ 2 laps	13	
9	22	(Sweden) Ronnie Peterson	March-Ford	78	+ 2 laps	16	
10	1	(Mexico) Pedro Rodríguez	BRM	77	+ 3 laps	7	
11	18	(Australia) Jack Brabham	Brabham-Ford	76	+ 4 laps	12	
NC	15	(United Kingdom) Graham Hill	Lotus-Ford	71	+ 9 laps	20	
Ret	6	(France) François Cevert	March-Ford	31	Engine	15	
Ret	3	(Canada) George Eaton	BRM	26	Oil leak	18	
Ret	2	(United Kingdom) Jackie Oliver	BRM	23	Engine	5	
Ret	4	(United Kingdom) Piers Courage	De Tomaso-Ford	22	Fatal accident	9	
Ret	9	(Switzerland) Jo Siffert	March-Ford	22	Engine	17	
Ret	20	(United Kingdom) Peter Gethin	McLaren-Ford	18	Accident	11	
Ret	32	(United States) Dan Gurney	McLaren-Ford	2	Engine	19	
Ret	8	(New Zealand) Chris Amon	March-Ford	1	Clutch	4	
DNQ	21	(Italy) Andrea de Adamich	McLaren-Alfa Romeo				
DNQ	19	(Germany) Rolf Stommelen	Brabham-Ford				
DNQ	31	(United States) Pete Lovely	Lotus-Ford				
DNQ	29	(Switzerland) Silvio Moser	Bellasi-Ford				

== Notes ==
- This was the Formula One World Championship debut for British driver and future Grand Prix winner Peter Gethin and for Swiss driver and future Grand Prix winner Clay Regazzoni.
- This was the first win for the Lotus 72.
- This race marked the 10th podium finish for an Austrian driver.
- This was the Formula One World Championship debut for Swiss constructor Bellasi.
- For the first time since the 1968 French Grand Prix, a Ford-powered car did not set the fastest lap during the race. This ended a record streak of 21 consecutive fastest laps set by a Ford-powered car.

== Championship standings after the race ==
Drivers' Championship standings

	Pos	Driver	Points
1	1	(United Kingdom) Jackie Stewart	19
2	2	(Austria) Jochen Rindt	18
2	3	(Australia) Jack Brabham	15
1	4	(Mexico) Pedro Rodríguez	10
	5	(New Zealand) Denny Hulme	9

Constructors' Championship standings

	Pos	Constructor	Points
	1	(United Kingdom) March-Ford	25
2	2	(United Kingdom) Lotus-Ford	23
1	3	(United Kingdom) Brabham-Ford	17
1	4	(United Kingdom) McLaren-Ford	16
	5	(France) Matra	13

- Note: Only the top five positions are included for both sets of standings.

Previous race: 1970 Belgian Grand Prix	FIA Formula One World Championship; 1970 season	Next race: 1970 French Grand Prix
Previous race: 1969 Dutch Grand Prix	Dutch Grand Prix	Next race: 1971 Dutch Grand Prix
