= 1970 Italian Grand Prix =

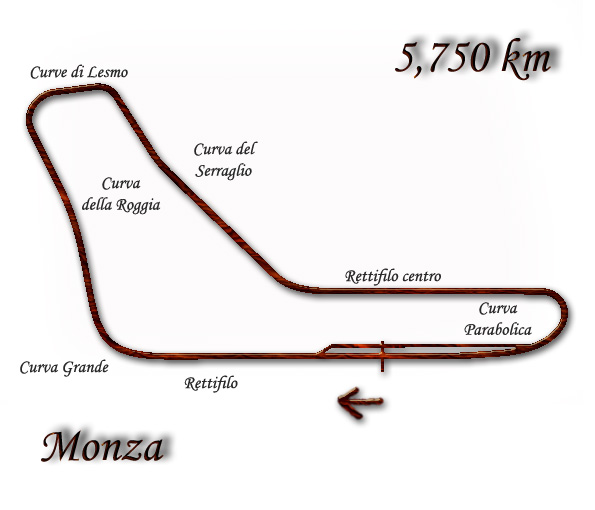

Race details
- Date: 6 September 1970
- Official name: XLI Gran Premio d'Italia
- Location: Autodromo Nazionale di Monza, Monza, Italy
- Course: Permanent racing facility
- Course length: 5.750 km (3.573 miles)
- Distance: 68 laps, 391.000 km (242.956 miles)
- Weather: Sunny, Dry

Pole position
Driver	(Belgium) Jacky Ickx	Ferrari
- Time: 1:24.14

Fastest lap
Driver	(Switzerland) Clay Regazzoni	Ferrari
- Time: 1:25.2 on lap 65

Podium
First	(Switzerland) Clay Regazzoni	Ferrari
Second	(United Kingdom) Jackie Stewart	March-Ford
Third	(France) Jean-Pierre Beltoise	Matra

The 1970 Italian Grand Prix was a Formula One motor race held at the Autodromo Nazionale di Monza on 6 September 1970. It was race 10 of 13 in both the 1970 World Championship of Drivers and the 1970 International Cup for Formula One Manufacturers. The race was marred by the death of Jochen Rindt, who died during the practice session on 5 September. Rindt himself went on to become Formula One's only posthumous World Champion to date. The 68-lap race was won by Ferrari driver Clay Regazzoni for his first Grand Prix victory after starting from third position. Jackie Stewart finished second for the Tyrrell team in one of the last races the team used the March chassis and Matra driver Jean-Pierre Beltoise came in third.

This was the last time that Monza was driven for 68 laps. From 1971 onwards, the race distance would be 55 laps. It was also the last win for a driver wearing an open-face helmet in Formula One. As of 2026, this was also the last time all three podium finishers used different tyre brands; Regazzoni used Firestones, Stewart used Dunlops and Beltoise used Goodyears.

== Qualifying classification ==
Pos	No	Driver	Constructor	Time	Gap	Grid
1	2	(Belgium) Jacky Ickx	Ferrari	1:24.14	—	1
2	10	(Mexico) Pedro Rodríguez	BRM	1:24.36	+0.22	2
3	4	(Switzerland) Clay Regazzoni	Ferrari	1:24.39	+0.25	3
4	18	(United Kingdom) Jackie Stewart	March-Ford	1:24.73	+0.59	4
5	6	(Italy) Ignazio Giunti	Ferrari	1:24.74	+0.60	5
6	8	(United Kingdom) Jackie Oliver	BRM	1:24.77	+0.63	6
7	50	(Switzerland) Jo Siffert	March-Ford	1:25.09	+0.95	7
8	44	(Australia) Jack Brabham	Brabham-Ford	1:25.39	+1.25	8
9	30	(New Zealand) Denny Hulme	McLaren-Ford	1:25.47	+1.33	9
10	14	(United Kingdom) John Surtees	Surtees-Ford	1:25.56	+1.42	10
11	20	(France) François Cevert	March-Ford	1:25.56	+1.42	11
12	22	(Austria) Jochen Rindt	Lotus-Ford	1:25.71	+1.57	DNS
13	34	(Italy) Andrea de Adamich	McLaren-Alfa Romeo	1:25.91	+1.77	12
14	52	(Sweden) Ronnie Peterson	March-Ford	1:25.93	+1.79	13
15	40	(France) Jean-Pierre Beltoise	Matra	1:26.01	+1.87	14
16	42	(France) Henri Pescarolo	Matra	1:26.04	+1.90	15
17	32	(United Kingdom) Peter Gethin	McLaren-Ford	1:26.19	+2.05	16
18	28	(United Kingdom) Graham Hill	Lotus-Ford	1:26.38	+2.24	DNS
19	24	(United Kingdom) John Miles	Lotus-Ford	1:26.51	+2.37	DNS
20	46	(Germany) Rolf Stommelen	Brabham-Ford	1:26.60	+2.46	17
21	48	(New Zealand) Chris Amon	March-Ford	1:26.67	+2.53	18
22	54	(Australia) Tim Schenken	De Tomaso-Ford	1:26.67	+2.53	19
23	12	(Canada) George Eaton	BRM	1:27.15	+3.01	20
DNQ	38	(Sweden) Jo Bonnier	McLaren-Ford	1:28.07	+3.93	—
DNQ	26	(Brazil) Emerson Fittipaldi	Lotus-Ford	1:28.39	+4.25	—
DNQ	36	(Italy) Nanni Galli	McLaren-Alfa Romeo	1:28.59	+4.45	—
DNQ	56	(Switzerland) Silvio Moser	Bellasi-Ford	1:28.61	+4.47	—

- Jochen Rindt qualified 12th, but did not start the race after he was killed after a mechanical failure causing an accident in Saturday qualifying. His place in grid was left vacant.

== Post-qualifying ==
Rindt died after seven minutes, before arriving to a hospital in Milan. The official time of death was given as 16 minutes, meaning that he had been killed instantly. The autopsy recorded the cause of death as head injuries likely caused by an impact from a wheel and suspension. Lotus team withdrew from the race on Sunday morning.

On 8 September, the FIA called a meeting at the request of the Italian Automobile Club to review the events of the weekend. Later on, the governing body announced new safety measures for the next round in Canada which included the entry and exit of the pit lane to be controlled by a curve to force cars to run at a reduced speed, no team mechanic would be allowed onto the pit lane surface except for pit stops and a draw would be arranged to determine the order in which cars make pit stops and be limited to emergencies with cars not taking on new tyres or allowed to refuel.

Rindt was the last Austrian driver for 24 years to die in a Formula One qualifying accident, until the death of Roland Ratzenberger from injuries sustained at the 1994 San Marino Grand Prix. It was also the last Austrian driver fatality until Helmut Koinigg at the 1974 United States Grand Prix.

Next two rounds, Rindt won the Driver’s Championship posthumously after the United States Grand Prix.

== Race classification ==
Pos	No	Driver	Constructor	Laps	Time/Retired	Grid	Points
1	4	(Switzerland) Clay Regazzoni	Ferrari	68	1:39:07.1	3	9
2	18	(United Kingdom) Jackie Stewart	March-Ford	68	+ 5.73	4	6
3	40	(France) Jean-Pierre Beltoise	Matra	68	+ 5.80	14	4
4	30	(New Zealand) Denny Hulme	McLaren-Ford	68	+ 6.15	9	3
5	46	(Germany) Rolf Stommelen	Brabham-Ford	68	+ 6.41	17	2
6	20	(France) François Cevert	March-Ford	68	+ 1:03.46	11	1
7	48	(New Zealand) Chris Amon	March-Ford	67	+ 1 Lap	18	
8	34	(Italy) Andrea de Adamich	McLaren-Alfa Romeo	61	+ 7 Laps	12	
NC	32	(United Kingdom) Peter Gethin	McLaren-Ford	60	+ 8 Laps	16	
Ret	8	(United Kingdom) Jackie Oliver	BRM	36	Engine	6	
Ret	52	(Sweden) Ronnie Peterson	March-Ford	35	Engine	13	
Ret	44	(Australia) Jack Brabham	Brabham-Ford	31	Accident	8	
Ret	2	(Belgium) Jacky Ickx	Ferrari	25	Clutch	1	
Ret	12	(Canada) George Eaton	BRM	21	Overheating	20	
Ret	54	(Australia) Tim Schenken	De Tomaso-Ford	17	Engine	19	
Ret	6	(Italy) Ignazio Giunti	Ferrari	14	Fuel system	5	
Ret	42	(France) Henri Pescarolo	Matra	14	Engine	15	
Ret	10	(Mexico) Pedro Rodríguez	BRM	12	Engine	2	
Ret	50	(Switzerland) Jo Siffert	March-Ford	3	Engine	7	
Ret	14	(United Kingdom) John Surtees	Surtees-Ford	0	Electrical	10	
DNS	16	(United Kingdom) Jackie Stewart	Tyrrell-Ford		Practice only		
DNS	28	(United Kingdom) Graham Hill	Lotus-Ford		Withdrew (Teammate's fatal accident)		
DNS	24	(United Kingdom) John Miles	Lotus-Ford		Withdrew (Teammate's fatal accident)		^{3}
DNS	22	(Austria) Jochen Rindt	Lotus-Ford		Fatal accident in qualifying		^{3}
DNQ	38	(Sweden) Jo Bonnier	McLaren-Ford				
DNS	26	(Brazil) Emerson Fittipaldi	Lotus-Ford		Withdrew (Teammate's fatal accident)		^{3}
DNQ	36	(Italy) Nanni Galli	McLaren-Alfa Romeo				
DNQ	56	(Switzerland) Silvio Moser	Bellasi-Ford				

Notes

- ^3 Lotus withdrew after the death of Jochen Rindt. Their places on the grid were left vacant.

== Notes ==
- This was the Formula One World Championship debut for Italian driver Nanni Galli.
- This was the 10th race start for British constructor March.
- This was the Formula One World Championship debut for British constructor Tyrrell.

== Championship standings after the race ==
Drivers' Championship standings

	Pos	Driver	Points
	1	(Austria) **Jochen Rindt***	45
3	2	(United Kingdom) **Jackie Stewart***	25
1	3	(Australia) **Jack Brabham***	25
1	4	(New Zealand) **Denny Hulme***	23
3	5	(Switzerland) **Clay Regazzoni***	21

Constructors' Championship standings

	Pos	Constructor	Points
	1	(United Kingdom) **Lotus-Ford***	50
	2	(United Kingdom) **March-Ford***	39
	3	(United Kingdom) **Brabham-Ford***	35
1	4	(Italy) **Ferrari***	34
1	5	(United Kingdom) **McLaren-Ford***	30

- Note: Only the top five positions are included for both sets of standings.
- Competitors in bold and marked with an asterisk still had a theoretical chance of becoming World Champion.

Previous race: 1970 Austrian Grand Prix	FIA Formula One World Championship; 1970 season	Next race: 1970 Canadian Grand Prix
Previous race: 1969 Italian Grand Prix	Italian Grand Prix	Next race: 1971 Italian Grand Prix
