= BRM P133 =

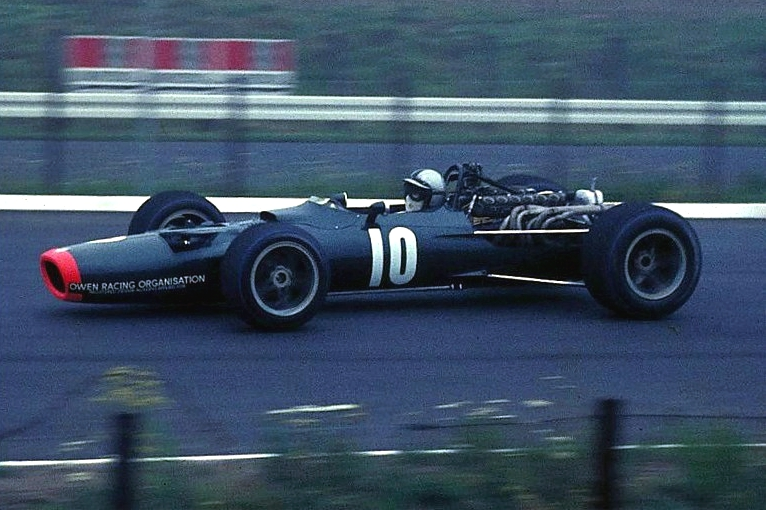
- Rodríguez in his BRM P133 in the 1968 German Grand Prix
- Category: Formula One
- Constructor: British Racing Motors
- Designer: Len Terry
- Predecessor: P126
- Successor: P138

Technical specifications
- Chassis: Aluminium alloy monocoque
- Suspension (front): Double wishbones
- Suspension (rear): coil springs over dampers
- Axle track: F: 1,575 mm (62.0 in); R: 1,575 mm (62.0 in)
- Wheelbase: 2,375 mm (93.5 in)
- Engine: BRM P142 2,998 cc (182.9 cu in) V12 Naturally aspirated, mid-mounted
- Transmission: Hewland DG300 5-speed manual
- Weight: 565 kg (1,246 lb)
- Fuel: Shell
- Tyres: Goodyear

Competition history
- Notable entrants: Owen Racing Organisation
- Notable drivers: (Mexico) Pedro Rodriguez (United Kingdom) Jackie Oliver
- Debut: 1968 Spanish Grand Prix
Races	Wins	Poles	F/Laps
15	0	0	1
- Constructors' Championships: 0
- Drivers' Championships: 0
- Unless otherwise stated, all data refer to Formula One World Championship Grands Prix only.

The BRM P133 was a Formula One racing car which raced in the 1968 and 1969 Formula One seasons.

== Design ==
The P133 was the works built version of the Len Terry designed P126, the three examples of which had been built by Terry's Transatlantic Automotive Consultants concern. It was powered by a 3.0-litre V12 engine.

== Racing history ==
Its best results were a second place at the 1968 Belgian Grand Prix, two third places at the 1968 Dutch Grand Prix and 1968 Canadian Grand Prix, as well as a fastest lap at the 1968 French Grand Prix all by Pedro Rodríguez.

=== 1968 ===
Rodríguez drove all but two races in the Owen Racing Organisation P133 in 1968.

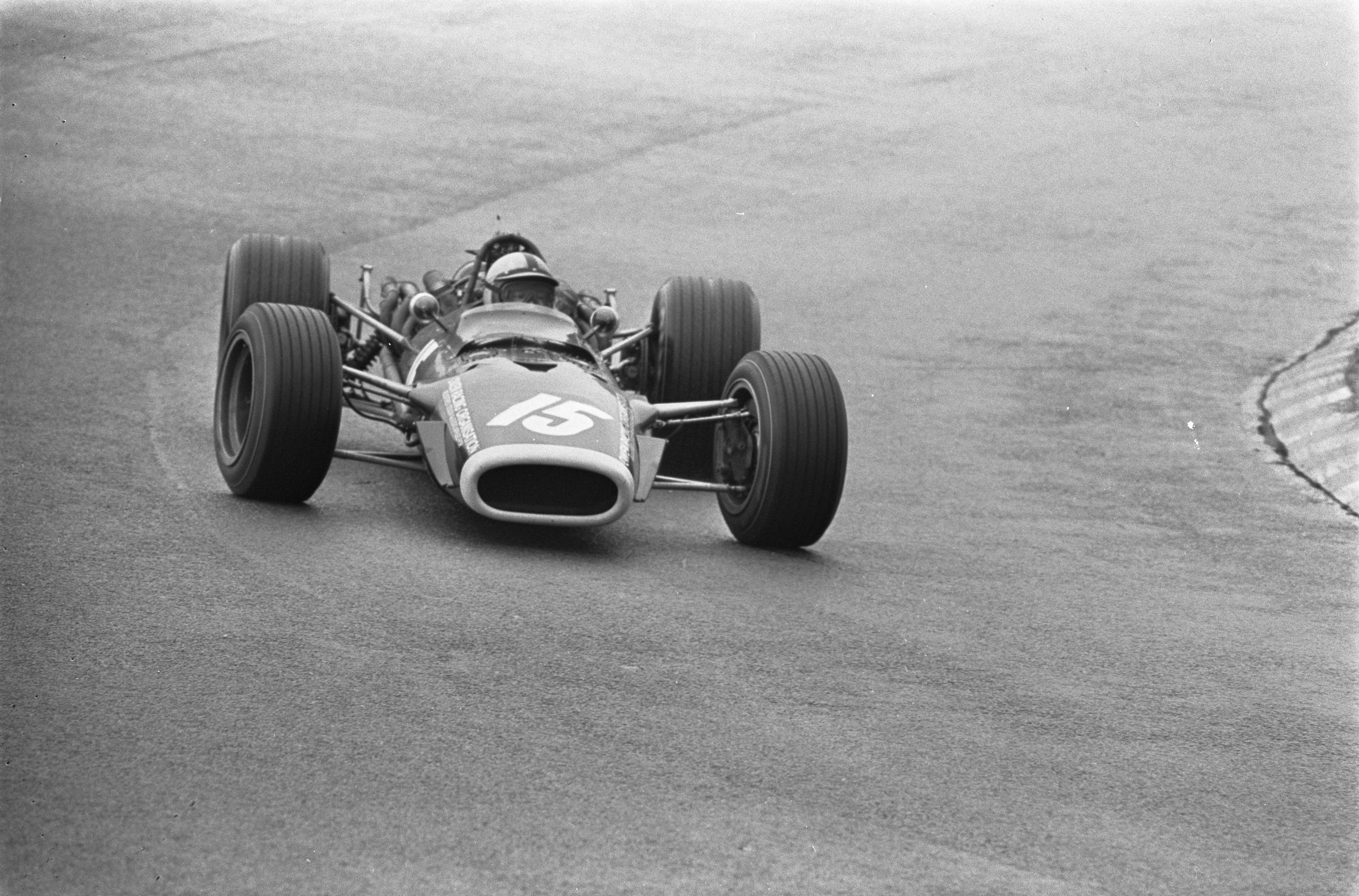
Rodríguez at the 1968 Dutch Grand Prix

The Spanish and Monaco Grands Prix saw the Mexican qualify second and ninth respectively and retire both times when he crashed. At Belgium, Rodríguez qualified eighth and finished second. The Dutch Grand Prix saw the Mexican qualify 11th and finish third. At France, Rodríguez qualified 10th and was not classified. The British Grand Prix saw the Mexican qualify 13th and retire when his engine blew. At Germany, Rodríguez qualified 14th and finished sixth. The P133 was not used in the Italian Grand Prix but was used for the Canadian Grand Prix when the Mexican qualified 12th and finished 3rd. In the United States, Rodríguez qualified 11th and retired with broken suspension. The final race of 1968 was the Mexican Grand Prix saw the Mexican qualify 12th and finish 4th in front of his home crowd.

At the end of the year, despite Rodríguez's good performances, BRM team manager Louis Stanley released him to the Reg Parnell Racing privately entered BRM team for 1969.

=== 1969 ===
Jackie Oliver replaced him for 1969.

The first race of the year was the South African Grand Prix when the Englishman qualified 14th and finished 7th. At Spain Oliver qualified 10th and retired with a broken oil pipe. The Monaco Grand Prix saw him qualify 13th and retire when he crashed into the back of Richard Attwood's Lotus. At Holland Oliver qualified 13th and retired with a broken gearbox. The team skipped the French Grand Prix but entered the British Grand Prix when Oliver qualified 13th and retired when his transmission failed.

== Formula One World Championship results ==
(key)(results in bold indicate pole position, results in italics indicate fastest lap)

Year	Entrant	Engine	Tyres	Drivers	1	2	3	4	5	6	7	8	9	10	11	12	Points	WCC
1968	Owen Racing Organisation	BRM V12	**G**		RSA	ESP	MON	BEL	NED	FRA	GBR	GER	ITA	CAN	USA	MEX	**28†**	**5th†**
1968	Owen Racing Organisation	BRM V12	**G**	Pedro Rodríguez		Ret	Ret	2	3	NC	Ret	6		3	Ret	4	**28†**	**5th†**
1969	Owen Racing Organisation	BRM V12	**D**		RSA	ESP	MON	NED	FRA	GBR	GER	ITA	CAN	USA	MEX		**7‡**	**5th‡**
1969	Owen Racing Organisation	BRM V12	**D**	Jackie Oliver	7	Ret	Ret	Ret		Ret							**7‡**	**5th‡**

‡ Points scored by P138 and P139 chassis
† Points scored by P126 chassis

== Non-Championship Formula One results ==
(key)(results in bold indicate pole position, results in italics indicate fastest lap)

Year	Entrant	Engine	Tyres	Drivers	1	2	3	4	5	6	7	8
1968	Owen Racing Organisation	BRM V12	G		ROC	INT	OUL					
1968	Owen Racing Organisation	BRM V12	G	Pedro Rodríguez	2	Ret						
1969	Owen Racing Organisation	BRM V12	D		ROC	INT	MAD	OUL				
1969	Owen Racing Organisation	BRM V12	D	Jackie Oliver	5							
1971	Lamplough Racing	BRM V12	F		ARG	ROC	QUE	SPR	INT	RIN	OUL	VIC
1971	Lamplough Racing	BRM V12	F	Robert Lamplough						12		
