= Tony Lanfranchi =

British racing driver (1935–2004)

- Born: 25 June 1935; Bradford, West Riding of Yorkshire, England
- Died: 7 October 2004 (aged 69); London, England

Formula One World Championship career
- Nationality: (United Kingdom) British
- Active years: 1968–1969
- Team(s): BRM and privateer Cooper
- Entries: 2 (0 starts)
- Championships: 0
- Wins: 0
- Podiums: 0
- Career points: 0
- Pole positions: 0
- Fastest laps: 0
- First entry: 1968 British Grand Prix
- Last entry: 1969 Canadian Grand Prix

Anthony Lanfranchi (25 June 1935 – 7 October 2004) was a British racing driver. He competed in many various events throughout a long racing career, including the 1965 24 Hours of Le Mans for Elva, non-championship Formula One races in 1968, and the British Formula Three Championship. Later in his career, he competed in saloon car racing, including the British Touring Car Championship.

"In his early racing days in Huddersfield he raced sports cars, including a Healey Silverstone, Austin-Healey and then an Elva Courier, in which he was quite successful in 1961. Nationally he made his mark in 1963 with an Elva-Ford Mk. VI."

On 16 September 1962, Lanfranchi won the inaugural Harewood hillclimb, setting the Fastest Time of the Day at 51.61s driving an Elva Mk VI.

In 1967, Lanfranchi was due to make his Formula One debut in the BRDC Daily Express Trophy meeting at Silverstone, but the transporter of the J.A. Pearce Racing Organisation burned out in the paddock prior to first practice. Three cars were destroyed and Lanfranchi was sidelined.

In 1980, a biography titled Down the Hatch : the life and fast times of Tony Lanfranchi by Mark Kahn was published.

In 2004, Lanfranchi died after suffering from cancer in his later years.

== Racing record ==
=== Complete British Saloon / Touring Car Championship results ===
(key) (Races in bold indicate pole position; races in italics indicate fastest lap.)

Year	Team	Car	Class	1	2	3	4	5	6	7	8	9	10	11	12	13	14	15	Pos.	Pts	Class
1965	Alexander Engineering Co.	Morris Mini Cooper S	B	BRH; 7	OUL; 7	SNE; 9	GOO; 8	SIL; 8	**CRY**; Ret†	BRH; Ret	OUL; Ret								9th	22	2nd
1966	Alexander Engineering Co.	Morris Mini Cooper S	B	SNE ?	GOO; Ret	SIL; 7	CRY; Ret†	BRH; 17	BRH; DNS	OUL ?†	BRH									8	
1967	Alan Fraser Racing Team	Hillman Imp	A	BRH ?	SNE; Ret	SIL ?	SIL; 9	MAL ?†	SIL ?	SIL; Ret	BRH	OUL; Ret†	**BRH**; 10							30	
1968	Alan Fraser Racing Team	Hillman Imp	A	BRH; Ret	THR	SIL	CRY ?†	MAL	**BRH**; 7	SIL	CRO; Ret	OUL	BRH; Ret	BRH; 11						18	
1974	Van Der Steen	BMW 3.0 CSi	C	MAL; Ret†	BRH; 2	SIL; DNS	OUL; Ret	THR	**SIL**; 3	THR; 7	SIL; 7	ING; 2†	BRH; 9†	OUL; 5	SNE; 3†	BRH; 8			6th	51	3rd
1975	National Organs	Chrysler Hemicuda	D	MAL; 6†	BRH; 5	OUL; Ret†	THR ?	SIL ?	BRH; 3†	THR; DNS	SIL; Ret†	MAL	SNE	SIL; Ret	ING	BRH	OUL	BRH	0	NC	0
1979	Tony Lanfranchi	Vauxhall Firenza Magnum 2300	C	SIL	OUL	THR	SIL	DON	SIL	MAL	DON; 9	BRH	THR	SNE	OUL				0	NC	0
1980	Tony Lanfranchi	Vauxhall Firenza Magnum 2300	B	MAL	OUL	THR	SIL; 13	SIL											13th	27	5th
1980	Tony Lanfranchi	Volkswagen Scirocco GTI	B						BRH; Ret										13th	27	5th
1980	Gti Engineering / Akai	Audi 80 GLE	B							MAL; 1†	BRH; 10	THR; Ret	SIL; 13						13th	27	5th
1982	TL Racing	Volkswagen Scirocco GTI	B	SIL; 13	MAL; 3†	OUL; 3†	THR; 10	THR; 10	SIL; Ret	DON; 8	BRH; Ret	DON; Ret	BRH; 6	SIL; 13					12th	36	3rd
1983	GM Dealer Sport	Opel Monza 3.0E	A	SIL; Ret	OUL; 5	THR; 6	BRH	THR; 9	SIL; 6	DON; 3	SIL; 7	DON; 10	BRH; 6	SIL; 6					13th	17	1st
1986	Monorep Ltd. Vauxhall Opel Main Dealer	Vauxhall Nova Sport	D	SIL	THR	**SIL**; 12	DON	BRH; 24	**SNE**; 11	BRH	DON	SIL							9th	26	1st
1989	Monorep Ltd. Vauxhall Opel Main Dealer	Vauxhall Astra GTE 16v	C	OUL	SIL	THR	DON	THR	SIL	SIL	BRH	SNE	BRH; 21	BIR	DON; 20	SIL; 24			31st	9	7th

† Events with 2 races staged for the different classes.

=== Complete 24 Hours of Le Mans results ===
Year	Team	Co-Drivers	Car	Class	Laps	Pos.	Class Pos.
1965	(United Kingdom) Anglian Racing Developments	(United Kingdom) Richard Wrottesley	Elva GT160-BMW	P 2.0	29	DNF	DNF
1969	(United Kingdom) M. Konig	(United Kingdom) Mark Konig	Nomad Mk 2-BRM	P 2.0	28	DNF	DNF
1985	(United Kingdom) Spice Engineering	(United Kingdom) Tim Lee-Davey (Australia) Neil Crang	Tiga GC84-Ford Cosworth	C2	226	NC	NC

=== Complete Formula One World Championship results ===
(key)

Year	Entrant	Chassis	Engine	1	2	3	4	5	6	7	8	9	10	11	12	WDC	Pts
1968	Owen Racing Organisation	BRM P126	BRM P101 3.0 V12	RSA	ESP	MON	BEL	NED	FRA	GBR; DNA	GER	ITA	CAN	USA	MEX	NC	0
1969	Falken Racing	Cooper T86	Maserati 10/F1 3.0 V12	RSA	ESP	MON	NED	FRA	GBR	GER	ITA	CAN; DNA	USA	MEX		NC	0

=== Non-Championship Formula One results ===
(key)

Year	Entrant	Chassis	Engine	1	2	3	4	5	6
1967	J A Pearce Engineering	Pearce 1	Martin 3.0 V8	ROC	SPC	INT; DNS	SYR	OUL	ESP
1968	P & M Racing Preparations	Brabham BT23B	Climax FPF 2.8 L4	ROC; 7	INT; Ret				
1968	Motor Racing Stable	BRM P261	BRM P60 2.0 V8			OUL; 5			
1970	Ulf Norinder	Lola T190 (F5000)	Chevrolet 5.0 V8	ROC	INT	OUL; DNS			
1972	Speed International Racing	McLaren M18 (F5000)	Chevrolet 5.0 V8	ROC	BRA	INT	OUL	REP	VIC; DNS

=== Complete European F5000 Championship results ===
(key)

Year	Entrant	Chassis	Engine	1	2	3	4	5	6	7	8	9	10	11	12	13	14	15	16	17	18	19	20	Pos.	Pts
1969	David Hepworth	Hepworth FF 4WD Special	Oldsmobile Traco 4.7 V8	OUL	BRH	BRH; 6	MAL	SIL	MON	KOK	ZAN	SNE	HOC	OUL	BRH									35th	125
1970	Ulf Norinder	Lola T190	Chevrolet 5.0 V8	OUL	BRH	ZOL	ZAN	SIL	BRH	CAS	MAL	MON	SIL	MNZ	AND	SAL	THR; 7	SIL; 6	OUL; DNS	SNE	HOC	OUL	BRH	22nd	1
1972	Speed International Racing	McLaren M18	Chevrolet 5.0 V8	BRH	MAL	SNE	BRH	NIV	SIL	MON	OUL	MAL	BRH	SIL	BRH; 8	OUL	BRH							NC	0
