= Lola T100 =

Open-wheel race car

The Lola T100 is a Formula 2 single-seater entered by German BMW team for the 1967 German Grand Prix, the seventh round of the 1967 Formula One World Championship. Designed by British manufacturer Lola Cars, led by engineer Eric Broadley, the T100 was raced by Britons David Hobbs and Brian Redman. A version adapted to the technical regulations of Formula 1 was also driven by German Hubert Hahne.

== History ==
During qualifying for the 1967 German Grand Prix, Hahne, driving a T100 adapted to Formula 1, fitted with a BMW engine and Dunlop tyres, qualified in fourteenth position, 28.7 seconds from the time for pole position of Jim Clark's Lotus. Hobbs, official driver of the Lola team but only having a version adapted to Formula 2 and equipped with Firestone tyres, only obtained a twenty-second place on the starting grid, 42.1 seconds behind. Clark. Redman, his teammate with a Ford-Cosworth engine, did not complete any timed laps and had to start from twenty-sixth and last place. In the race, while Redman gave up his chassis to Hobbs (who, however, kept his BMW engine), the Briton finished tenth and second-last in the event, two laps behind winner Denny Hulme. Hahne found himself twelfth at the end of the first lap, overtook the BRM of Mike Spence the next lap, then occupied ninth place at the end of the fourth lap, then eighth on the next lap, before retiring on the sixth lap, following a suspension failure while in sixth.

A few weeks later, on 16 September 1967, Redman entered a Formula 2 version of the Lola T100 in the 1967 International Gold Cup, a round outside the Formula 1 World Championship held at the Oulton Park circuit. The Briton retired on the first lap following the failure of his Ford-Cosworth 4-cylinder engine. At the next non-championship event, at the Spanish Grand Prix, Redman, this time with a single-seater configured for Formula 1, finished eighth two laps behind Jim Clark, while the two BMW drivers entered for the occasion, Jo Siffert and Hahne retired respectively on the forty-fifth and thirty-third laps following a failure of the Bavarian engine.

The following year, on 17 March 1968, Briton John Surtees contested the 1968 Race of Champions at the Brands Hatch circuit, driving a T100 powered by a BMW engine but did not start the event due to an oil leak.

On May 12, the Spaniard Jorge de Bagration was entered for his national Grand Prix, the second round of the 1968 Formula One World Championship, at the wheel of a Lola T100 adapted to Formula 1 and equipped with a Ford-Cosworth engine and Dunlop tyres, entered by Escuderia Calvo Sotello but his car being unavailable, he did not start.

== Formula One World Championship results ==
(key)

Year	Entrant	Engines	Tyres	Drivers	1	2	3	4	5	6	7	8	9	10	11	12	WCC	Pts.
1967	Bayerische Motoren Werke AG	BMW M10 2.0 L4	D		RSA	MON	NED	BEL	FRA	GBR	GER	CAN	ITA	USA	MEX		NC	0
1967	Bayerische Motoren Werke AG	BMW M10 2.0 L4	D	(West Germany) Hubert Hahne							Ret						NC	0
1967	Lola Cars	BMW M10 2.0 L4	F	(United Kingdom) David Hobbs							10						—N/a	
1967	David Bridges	Ford Cosworth FVA 1.6 L4	D	(United Kingdom) Brian Redman							DNS						—N/a	
1968	Escuderia Nacional CS	Ford Cosworth FVA 1.6 L4	D		RSA	ESP	MON	BEL	NED	FRA	GBR	GER	ITA	CAN	USA	MEX	NC	0
1968	Escuderia Nacional CS	Ford Cosworth FVA 1.6 L4	D	(Spain) Jorge de Bagration		DNA											NC	0

== Formula One Non-Championship results ==
(key)

Year	Entrant	Engines	Tyres	Drivers	1	2	3	4	5	6
1967	David Bridges	Ford Cosworth FVA 1.6 L4	D		ROC	SPC	INT	SYR	OUL	ESP
1967	David Bridges	Ford Cosworth FVA 1.6 L4	D	(United Kingdom) Brian Redman					Ret	8
1967	Bayerische Motoren Werke AG	BMW M12 2.0 L4	D	(Switzerland) Jo Siffert						Ret
1967	Bayerische Motoren Werke AG	BMW M12 2.0 L4	D	(West Germany) Hubert Hahne						Ret
1968	Lola Cars	BMW M12 2.0 L4	F		ROC	INT	OUL			
1968	Lola Cars	BMW M12 2.0 L4	F	(United Kingdom) John Surtees	DNS					
