= Race of Champions (Brands Hatch) =

Non-championship Formula One race in the UK

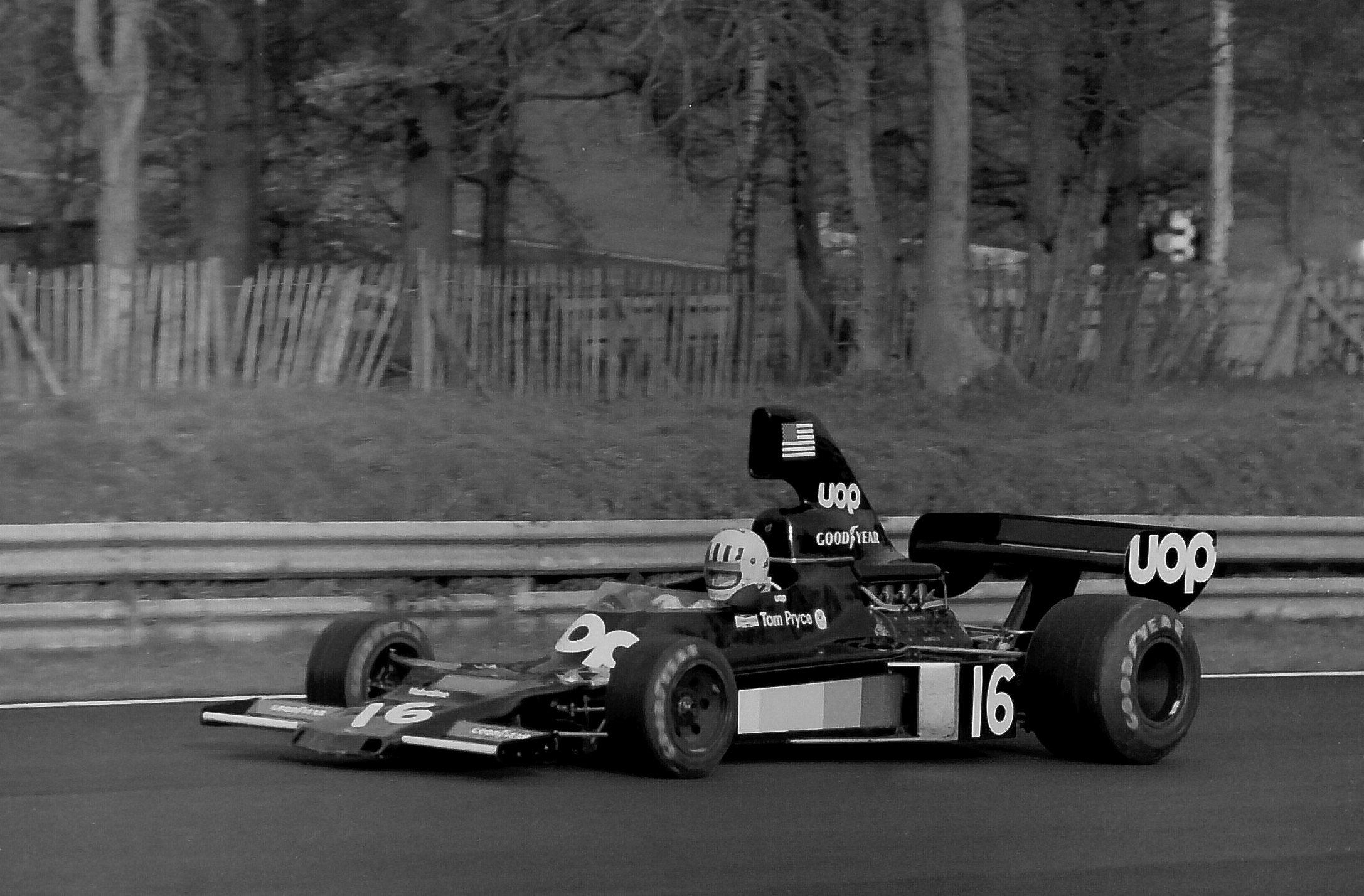
Tom Pryce in 1975

The Race of Champions was a non-championship Formula One motor race held at the Brands Hatch circuit in Kent, United Kingdom between 1965 and 1979, and again in 1983. It often attracted high quality entries from the Formula One World Championship. The first race was won by Mike Spence. The last running of the event was the last non-championship Formula One race (excluding the Formula One Indoor Trophy sprint event) and was won by reigning World Champion Keke Rosberg in a Williams-Cosworth after a tight battle with F1 rookie, American driver Danny Sullivan in a Tyrrell-Cosworth.

== 1968 Race of Champions ==
The 1968 Race of Champions was held on 17 March, and was notable for the close competition between leading teams and drivers. Bruce McLaren won the race, driving a McLaren M7A powered by a Cosworth DFV V8 engine. The second-place finisher was Pedro Rodriguez, driving a BRM P133, followed by Denny Hulme in another McLaren M7A. Notably, Graham Hill had to retire due to a driveshaft failure after just 10 laps in his Lotus 49.

The event also witnessed several retirements and non-starters, including John Surtees, whose Lola T100 did not start due to an oil leak. Jo Siffert and Andrea de Adamich also failed to start after crashing during practice.

== 1979 Race of Champions ==
By 1979, the relevance and prestige of the Race of Champions had diminished significantly due to the expanding calendar, which included 16 official Grand Prix events. As reported by Motor Sport Magazine, the 1979 Race of Champions was initially scheduled for March 18, 1979, but it was cancelled due to heavy snow. The snowfall, measuring up to six inches on the Friday before the event, forced the cancellation of the race, along with various support races.

The cancellation was a disappointment for fans, though many teams had already planned to send their number two drivers and older cars due to the proximity of the Long Beach Grand Prix in California. As a result, interest from the top-tier teams was limited, and many teams had already withdrawn before the official cancellation.

The cancellation marked a turning point for non-championship Formula One races, and by the early 1980s, it became increasingly difficult to attract major teams to these events. The Race of Champions was eventually discontinued in 1983, as Formula One's professional schedule left little room for non-championship events.

=== More information ===
- The Race of Champions was part of a tradition that also included the International Trophy at Silverstone, with both races alternating as non-championship events in early-season calendars. However, as Formula One grew in scope and global importance, these non-championship races became obsolete.
- The 1979 race was intended to benefit the Gunnar Nilsson Cancer Fund, with £100,000 guaranteed from the event's profits. However, due to the cancellation, these funds were not generated.

== Winners of the Race of Champions ==
=== By year ===
Year	Driver	Constructor	Report
1965	(United Kingdom) Mike Spence	Lotus	Report
1966	Not held		
1967	(United States) Dan Gurney	Eagle	Report
1968	(New Zealand) Bruce McLaren	McLaren	Report
1969	(United Kingdom) Jackie Stewart	Matra	Report
1970	(United Kingdom) Jackie Stewart	March	Report
1971	(Switzerland) Clay Regazzoni	Ferrari	Report
1972	(Brazil) Emerson Fittipaldi	Lotus	Report
1973	(United Kingdom) Peter Gethin	Chevron †	Report
1974	(Belgium) Jacky Ickx	Lotus	Report
1975	(United Kingdom) Tom Pryce	Shadow	Report
1976	(United Kingdom) James Hunt	McLaren	Report
1977	(United Kingdom) James Hunt	McLaren	Report
1978	Not held		
1979	(Canada) Gilles Villeneuve	Ferrari	Report
1980 – 1982	Not held		
1983	(Finland) Keke Rosberg	Williams	Report

† Formula 5000 car
