= BRM P126 =

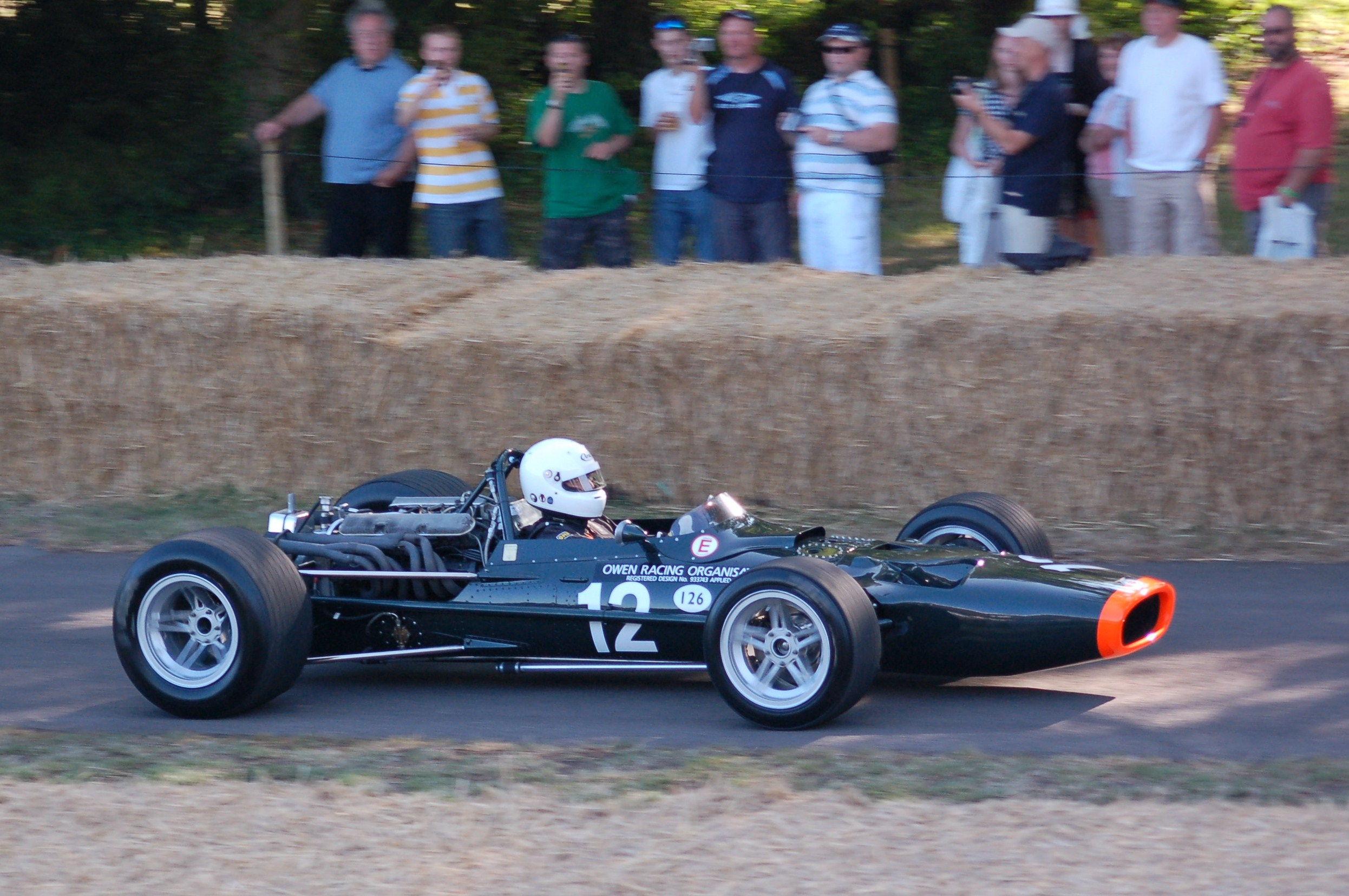
- BRM P126 at Goodwood in 2009
- Category: Formula One
- Constructor: British Racing Motors
- Designer: Len Terry
- Predecessor: P115
- Successor: P133

Technical specifications
- Chassis: Magnesium alloy monocoque
- Axle track: F: 1,575 mm (62.0 in); R: 1,575 mm (62.0 in)
- Wheelbase: 2,375 mm (93.5 in)
- Engine: BRM P101 2,998 cc (182.9 cu in) V12 naturally aspirated, mid-mounted
- Transmission: 5-speed manual
- Weight: 565kg
- Fuel: Shell
- Tyres: Goodyear; Dunlop

Competition history
- Notable entrants: Owen Racing Organisation; Reg Parnell Racing
- Notable drivers: (Mexico) Pedro Rodriguez (United Kingdom) Richard Attwood (United Kingdom) Piers Courage
- Debut: 1968 South African Grand Prix
Races	Wins	Poles	F/Laps
15	0	0	1
- Constructors' Championships: 0
- Drivers' Championships: 0
- Unless otherwise stated, all data refer to Formula One World Championship Grands Prix only.

The BRM P126 was a Formula One racing car which raced in the 1968 and 1969 Formula One seasons. It was powered by a 3.0-litre V12 engine. Design was contracted out to former Lotus and Eagle designer Len Terry and the three examples built were constructed by his Transatlantic Automotive Consultants company due to pressure of work at BRM.

== Owen Racing Organisation ==
The Owen Racing Organisation entered Pedro Rodríguez in the South African Grand Prix, He qualified 10th and retired with a fuel system failure. The team hired Richard Attwood to drive six races. The first event Attwood competed at was Monaco, he qualified sixth and finished second. At the Belgian Grand Prix Attwood qualified 18th and retired with a broken oil pipe. At Holland, he qualified 15th and finished seventh. The French Grand Prix saw the Englishman qualify 12th and finish 7th. At Britain, Attwood qualified 15th and retired with a broken radiator. At the German Grand Prix he qualified 20th and finished 14th. Atwood was replaced by Bobby Unser for the Italian Grand Prix who set a fast time in the early qualifying session. It had been Unser's intention to fly back to the United States for the Hoosier Hundred, at Indiana State Fair grounds, the following day and then return to Milan and race in the Grand Prix. The event organisers announced that if he returned to the United States and race, he would be banned from competing in the Grand Prix, under a ruling which forbade drivers to complete in another event within 24 hours of the start of the Grand Prix. So Unser flew back to the US and did not return. The Owen Racing Organisation thereafter, concentrated their efforts on the BRM P133.

== Reg Parnell Racing ==
Reg Parnell Racing entered Piers Courage in the Spanish Grand Prix. He qualified 11th and retired with fuel pump failure. At Monaco Courage qualified 11th and retired with a chassis problem. The Belgian Grand Prix saw the Englishman qualify 7th and retire when his engine blew. At Holland, Courage qualified 14th and retired when he spun off. At the French Grand Prix the Englishman qualified 14th and finished 6th. At Britain, Courage qualified 16th and finished 8th. The German Grand Prix saw the Englishman qualify 8th and finish 8th. At Italy Courage qualified 17th and finished 4th. The Canadian Grand Prix saw the Englishman qualify 14th and retire with a broken gearbox. At the United States, Courage qualified 14th and retired when he ran out of fuel. The Mexican Grand Prix saw the Englishman qualify 19th and retire when his engine blew. Courage left at the end of the year to drive a Brabham entered by Frank Williams. The Team hired Pedro Rodríguez for 1969 but he only took part in three races. In the South African Grand Prix the Mexican qualified 15th and retired with a water leak. At the Spanish Grand Prix he qualified 14th and retired when his engine blew, At Monaco the Mexican qualified 14th and retired when his engine blew.

== Formula One World Championship results ==
(key)(results in bold indicate pole position, results in italics indicate fastest lap)

Year	Entrant	Engine	Tyres	Drivers	1	2	3	4	5	6	7	8	9	10	11	12	Points	WCC
1968	Owen Racing Organisation	BRM V12	G		RSA	ESP	MON	BEL	NED	FRA	GBR	GER	ITA	CAN	USA	MEX	28†	5th†
1968	Owen Racing Organisation	BRM V12	G	Pedro Rodríguez	Ret												28†	5th†
1968	Owen Racing Organisation	BRM V12	G	Mike Spence		DNA											28†	5th†
1968	Owen Racing Organisation	BRM V12	G	Richard Attwood			2	Ret	7	7	Ret	14					28†	5th†
1968	Owen Racing Organisation	BRM V12	G	Bobby Unser									DNS				28†	5th†
1968	Reg Parnell Racing	BRM V12	G	Piers Courage		Ret	Ret	Ret	Ret	6	8	8	4	Ret	Ret	Ret	28†	5th†
1969	Reg Parnell Racing	BRM V12	G		RSA	ESP	MON	NED	FRA	GBR	GER	ITA	CAN	USA	MEX		7‡	5th‡
1969	Reg Parnell Racing	BRM V12	G	Pedro Rodríguez	Ret	Ret	Ret										7‡	5th‡

‡ Points scored by P138 and P139 chassis
† Points scored by P133 chassis

== Non-Championship Formula One results ==
(key)(results in bold indicate pole position, results in italics indicate fastest lap)

Year	Entrant	Engine	Tyres	Drivers	1	2	3	4	5	6	7	8
1968	Owen Racing Organisation	BRM V12	G		ROC	INT	OUL					
1968	Owen Racing Organisation	BRM V12	G	Mike Spence	Ret	Ret						
1968	Reg Parnell Racing	BRM V12	G	Piers Courage		5	Ret					
1968	Reg Parnell Racing	BRM V12	G	Pedro Rodríguez			4					
1969	Reg Parnell Racing	BRM V12	G		ROC	INT	MAD	OUL				
1969	Reg Parnell Racing	BRM V12	G	Pedro Rodríguez	Ret	8						
1971	Lamplough Racing	BRM V12	F		ARG	ROC	QUE	SPR	INT	RIN	OUL	VIC
1971	Lamplough Racing	BRM V12	F	Bernd Terbeck						DNS		
