= McLaren M7A =

Formula One racing car

McLaren M7A McLaren M7B McLaren M7C McLaren M7D
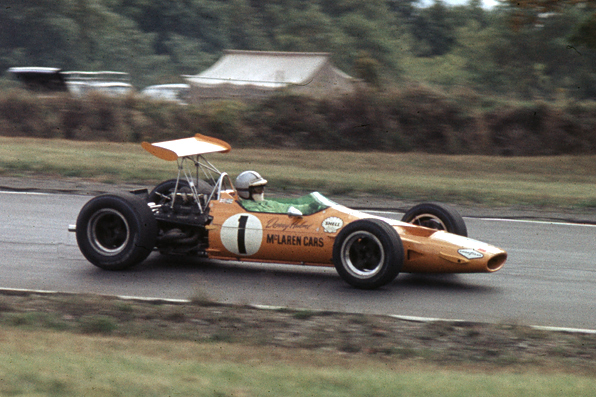
- Denny Hulme (1936–1992) in a McLaren M7A at the 1968 United States Grand Prix
- Category: Formula One
- Constructor: McLaren
- Designers: Robin Herd; Gordon Coppuck
- Predecessor: McLaren M5A
- Successor: McLaren M9A / McLaren M14A

Technical specifications
- Chassis: Aluminium alloy and magnesium alloy monocoque
- Suspension (front): Upper and lower top links, radius arms and outboard coilover springs and dampers
- Suspension (rear): Lateral top links, twin radius arms, reversed wishbones and outboard coilover springs and dampers
- Engine: Ford-Cosworth DFV 2993cc V8 naturally aspirated Mid-engine, longitudinally mounted
- Transmission: Hewland DG300 5-speed manual
- Fuel: Shell (McLaren); Gulf (Anglo)
- Tyres: Goodyear (McLaren); Dunlop (Anglo)

Competition history
- Notable entrants: Bruce McLaren Motor Racing, Anglo American Racers
- Notable drivers: (New Zealand) Bruce McLaren (New Zealand) Denny Hulme (United States) Dan Gurney (Anglo)
- Debut: 1968 Spanish Grand Prix
Races	Wins	Poles	F/Laps
22	4	0	0
- Constructors' Championships: 0 (Best: 2nd – 1968)
- Drivers' Championships: 0

The McLaren M7A is a Formula One racing car built by McLaren and used in the world championship between 1968 and 1971. After two relatively unsuccessful years of Formula One competition, the M7A was used to score McLaren's first win at the 1968 Belgian Grand Prix.

Designed by Robin Herd and Gordon Coppuck, the M7A was the first McLaren to be powered by the Cosworth DFV engine, which went on to be used by the team until 1983. The M7B was a development of the M7A (chassis M7A/3), and had outboard fuel tanks riveted to the existing bath-tub monocoque to house the fuel bags, along with wrap-over panel-work similar to the M10, thus creating an interim full-monocoque chassis. The M7C was effectively a Formula 5000 M10A chassis with the horn removed at the rear of the cockpit to enable the fitment of the DFV engine, whilst the M7D was powered by an Alfa-Romeo engine.

The M7A made its Grand Prix debut at the second race of the 1968 world championship. After its victory in Belgium, it took another two wins that year, helping to place McLaren second in the Constructors' Championship.

== Background ==
Bruce McLaren Motor Racing was founded in 1963; Bruce McLaren was a factory driver for the Cooper motor racing team which competed in Formula One, the highest level of international single-seater competition. Since 1966, McLaren and his team had been building and racing their own Formula One cars. Their first two seasons had been relatively unsuccessful, with six points scored (out of a potential 180 (Note: A total of 20 Formula One world championship races were held in 1966 and 1967, for each of which a maximum of nine points was awarded.)) and a best result of fourth. The lack of a suitable engine caused problems: the 1966 M2B car's Ford and Serenissima V8 engines both lacked power and the 1967 M5A's British Racing Motors V12 did not arrive until mid-season.

In 1967 Cosworth debuted their DFV engine which was supplied exclusively to the Lotus team. It was immediately successful, winning its first race, and in 1968 it became available for purchase by any manufacturer. McLaren bought five DFV engines at a cost of 7,500 pounds sterling each. Designer Robin Herd was recruited to the team in 1965 before which he had been an aerospace engineer at the National Gas Turbine Establishment (NGTE) where he worked on the Concorde project. His assistant Gordon Coppuck was another ex-NGTE employee. Herd began the design of the M7A towards the end of 1967 but left to join Cosworth before its completion, leaving Coppuck and Bruce McLaren to complete the work.

== Design ==
The M7A was an open-wheeled single-seater with a mid-mounted engine driving the rear wheels. The chassis was a bathtub-type (i.e. open-topped) monocoque initially made from 22-gauge aluminium alloy panels glued and riveted together and to three steel bulkheads. Magnesium alloy was used for the dash panel, battery cover and numerous smaller non-folded panels. The monocoque terminated behind the driver's seat and the engine was used as a stressed member, bolted directly to the rearmost bulkhead. The gearbox was then attached behind the engine, and the rear suspension – consisting of lateral top links, twin radius arms and reversed wishbones– attached to the gearbox and the rear bulkhead. The front suspension – upper and lower lateral links and radius arms – and the steering column were attached to the two bulkheads in front of the driver. Coilover springs and Koni dampers mounted outside of the body were employed front and rear. These were soon after replaced with the more proven Armstrong units.

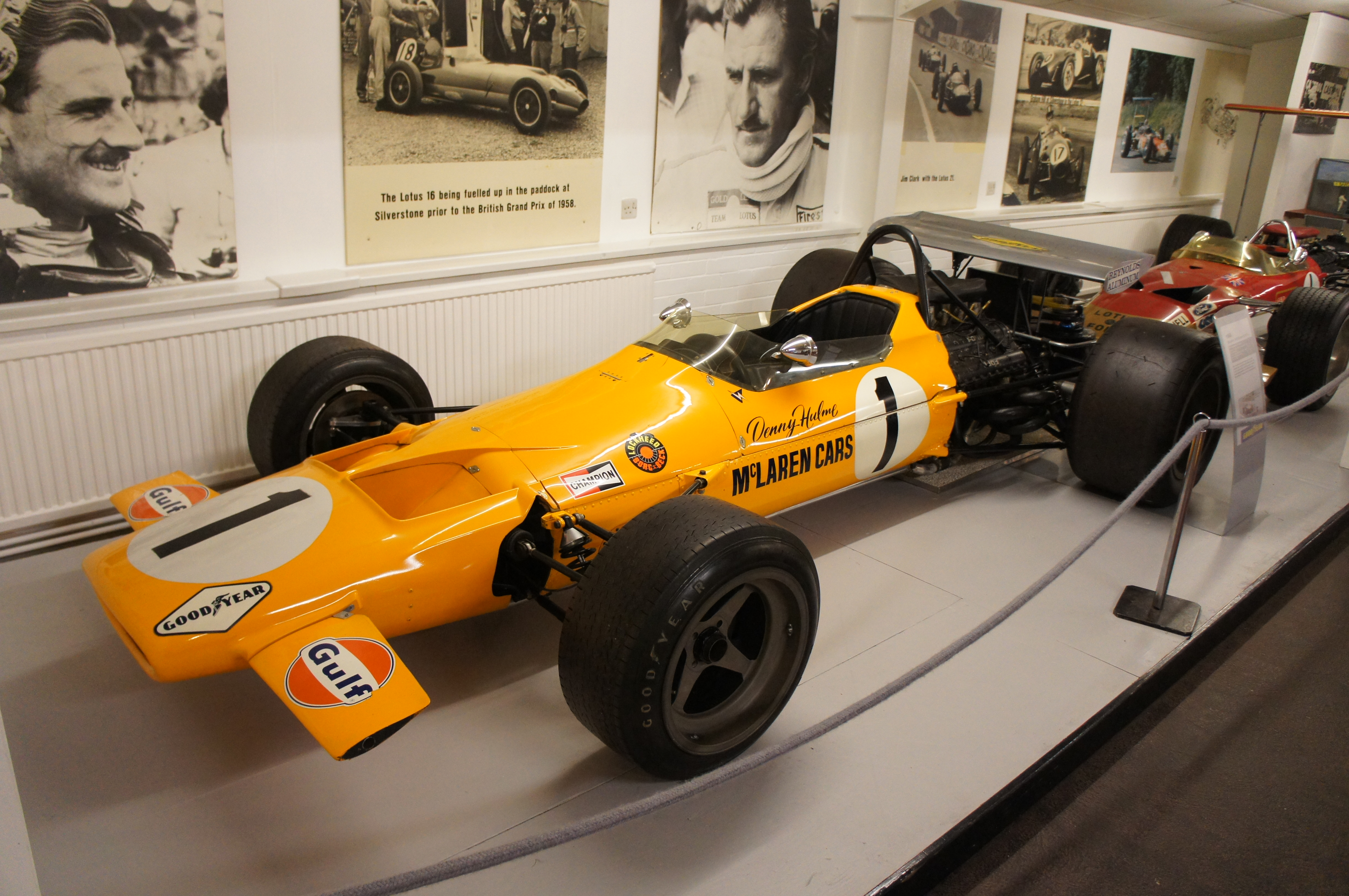
The M7D restored to M7A 'Cosworth DFV' Specification on display in the Donington Collection

The outer bodywork was mostly formed by the monocoque, except for the nose and cockpit which were covered by glass-reinforced plastic (GRP) panels; the engine sometimes also had a GRP cover. The wheelbase for the prototype car (M7A/1) was noted as 7ft 9.6", M7A/2 and M7A/3 were subsequently 96.5", just 0.5" longer than its short lived predecessor, the M5A; the front track 58 inches (1,500 mm) and the rear track 57 inches (1,400 mm); weight was 1,140 pounds (520 kg). McLaren's own magnesium alloy wheels were used; they were 15-inch (380 mm) diameter at the rear and 15- or sometimes 13-inch (330 mm) diameter at the front.

Fuel was stored in tanks running down the side of the chassis, above the driver's legs and behind their seat, totalling 40 imperial gallons (180 L) capacity. Full capacity was not required for most races so the tank above the driver's legs was usually almost empty. For the M7A's first two world championship races, Bruce McLaren's car was fitted with outboard "pannier" fuel tanks at the side of the cockpit. McLaren had a theory that sports racing cars' handling was superior to that of single-seaters because of the weight distribution of their fuel; the pannier tanks were an attempt to replicate this. According to McLaren mechanic Tyler Alexander this idea was developed in discussion with Lotus boss Colin Chapman. After the car was damaged at the 1968 Monaco Grand Prix, it was rebuilt without the pannier tanks.

The prototype car, M7A/1 was initially fitted with 10.5-inch (266.7mm) diameter solid disc brakes and Girling calipers whilst McLaren awaited delivery of their newly commissioned brake system, which was unusual both in being made by Lockheed when most British Formula One teams used Girling brakes, and in being ventilated. The prototype car was fitted with the all new brake system in early 1968 and subsequent M7A's adopted the same type of brakes. The new Lockheed four-piston lightweight alloy caliper being able to accommodate the larger designed discs which now measured 11.625 inches (295mm) in diameter. Ventilated discs, which are in turn thicker in section, have a hollow area between the two outer disc surfaces to aid cooling – had been tried by Lotus who had suffered from cracking problems caused by rapid heating and cooling. The McLaren team hoped that by being mounted well within the wheels, their discs would retain a more constant temperature.

During the 1968 season, wings – which press the car and tyres towards the ground thereby increasing cornering speeds and reducing braking distances – first appeared on Formula One cars in races. Teams experimented with various wing set-ups and the governing body of the sport, the CSI, regulated their use. McLaren had first experimented with wings on their 1965 M2A Formula One development car but didn't use them on the following season's racing car, the M2B. The M7A and its variants wore a variety of wing configurations, as described in the racing history section.

The DFV engine, whose development was funded by Ford and which was designed and constructed by Cosworth, was normally aspirated with eight cylinders arranged in a v configuration (i.e. a V8) of 90 degrees. The block was made from aluminium alloy and the cylinder liners from iron. It had four valves per cylinder, actuated by double overhead camshafts. Liquid-cooling was provided by a radiator situated in the nose which vented through ducts in the upper body surface whilst the engine oil was cooled by a radiator mounted on top of the gearbox at the rear. Peak power was 410 bhp (306 kW) at 9,000 rpm. The gearbox was a Hewland DG300.

The works cars were painted Traffic Yellow, a British Standard colour, number 368 on the 381C scale which was used in the paint and fibreglass gel-coat industry. This yellow/orange colour was later incorrectly described as papaya however in reality it was only ever known as McLaren Orange by the factory; it was not a national racing colour, however, the colour would continue to be used on works McLaren cars until Yardley sponsorship was obtained in 1972.

== Variants ==
=== M7B ===
The M7B was a one-off conversion of M7A/3, the car which, in its original specification, brought the first F1 Grand Prix win for McLaren Cars at the Belgian GP in 1968. The fuel was stored low and centrally in bags which were housed inside L72 aluminium pontoons, riveted either side of the cockpit and terminating at the engine by a new, full width magnesium bulkhead. This was another result of Bruce McLaren's theory about improving the car's handling by altering the fuel weight distribution. Author and former McLaren secretary Eoin Young said that another purpose of the outboard tanks was to make room for a four-wheel-drive system. (Note: Young (1995) refers to the "side-tank" version with "pannier fuel tanks" as the M7C, apparently in error, although it is unclear whether the author is discussing the M7B or the earlier M7A with pannier tanks. Elsewhere in Young (1995), the author identifies the version fitted with integral pannier tanks as the M7B, as do Nye (1988) and Taylor (2009).)

=== M7C ===
The chief distinguishing characteristic of M7C was its fully enclosed monocoque which gave greater torsional rigidity than the bathtub chassis. The chassis was identical to McLaren's M10A Formula 5000 car, save for the removal of the horns at the rear of the monocoque, which itself was derived from the M7A. One was made.

=== M7D ===
The M7D was commissioned by Alfa Romeo's Autodelta competition department and was powered by a 3.0 litre V8 engine from Alfa Romeo's T33 sports car. The engine is variously cited as producing peak power of between 410 bhp (306 kW) and 430 bhp (321 kW) (the highest figure said to be produced at 10,500 rpm), with good levels of torque, but McLaren found that performance varied significantly between units. The wheelbase remained similar at 96" however a new mounting point was created for the alternator which, unlike the DFV arrangement, was not integrated with the engine. One M7D was built up on a new chassis based on the M7 series design.

== Racing history ==
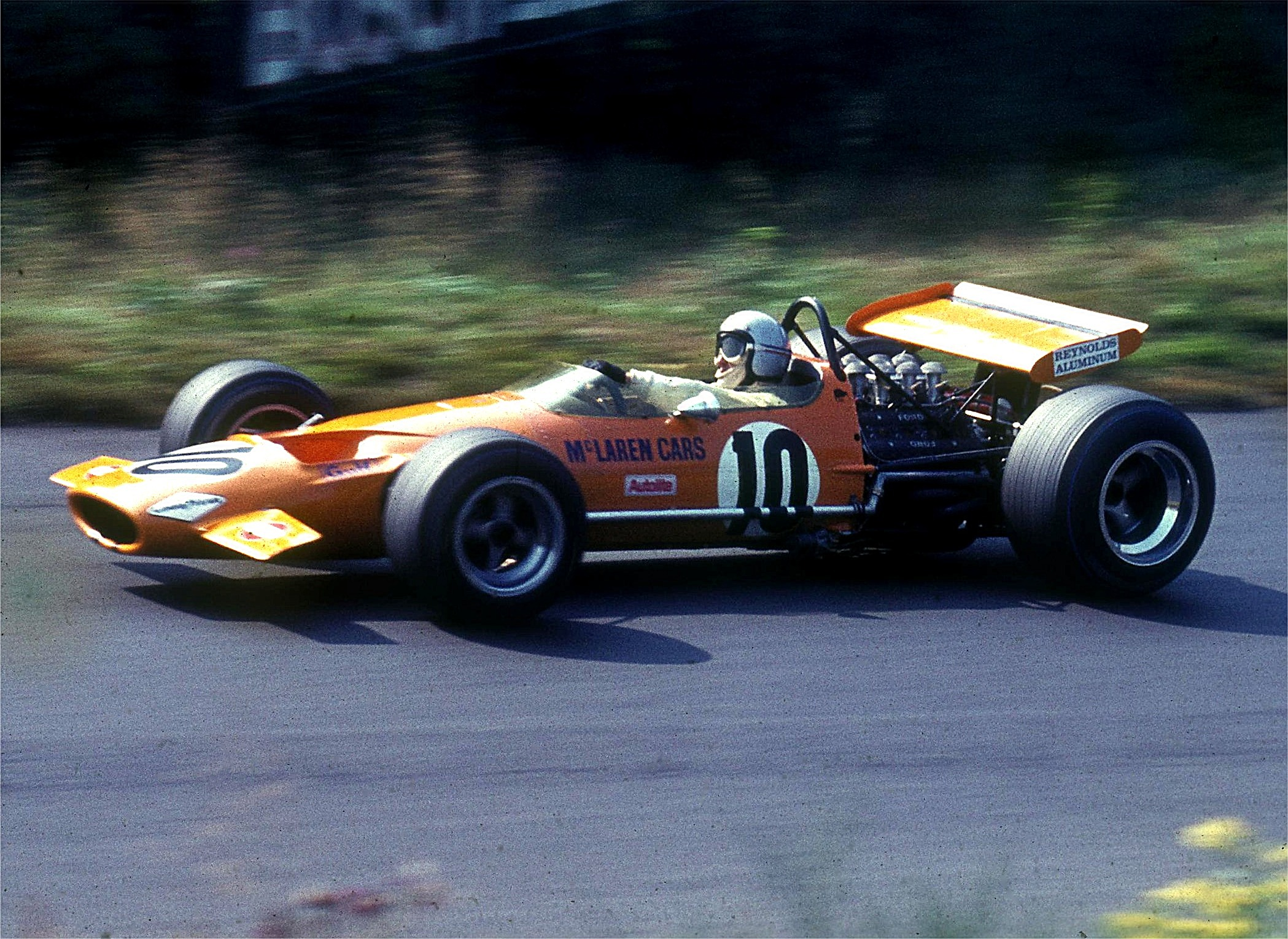
Bruce McLaren (1937–1970) in an M7C in the 1969 German Grand Prix

For the 1968 Formula One season, after two years of driving the team's sole entry, Bruce McLaren was partnered by Denny Hulme. Hulme was world champion with the Brabham team in 1967 and had raced for McLaren that year in Can-Am, a North American sports car racing series. For the first round of the 1968 world championship – the South African Grand Prix, which was held in January, four months before the second round – only Hulme competed, using the M5A to finish fifth. The M7A's first race was the Race of Champions at Brands Hatch, run to Formula One rules but not part of the world championship. There, McLaren won from pole position while Hulme was third. Another victory came at the non-championship BRDC International Trophy at Silverstone, this time with Hulme finishing first and McLaren second. In the M7A's championship debut in Spain, Hulme was second and McLaren retired, then in Monaco McLaren crashed and Hulme was fifth and last. At the Belgian Grand Prix, they were fifth and sixth on the grid. Hulme took the lead and held it until a half shaft failed two thirds of the way in. McLaren was then second behind Jackie Stewart's Matra but Stewart had to make a pit stop for fuel on the final lap, giving McLaren the win, although he initially believed he had finished second. It was the McLaren team's first world championship victory and Bruce McLaren became the second driver, after Jack Brabham, to win in a car bearing their own name; it was also the last win of his career.

After Belgium, McLaren's Goodyear tyres suffered a slump in competitiveness and the team and their car fell behind rivals Graham Hill in his Lotus and Stewart in his Matra. At the Dutch Grand Prix McLaren crashed out and Hulme retired with ignition failure. After Lotus had begun the first experimentation with wings in Monaco and Ferrari and Brabham had debuted full height wings in Belgium, McLaren fitted a rear wing to their car for the French Grand Prix. However, mounted above the engine on the sprung mass of the car, it was not as effective as Lotus's wing mounted on the unsprung suspension components. In France Hulme was fourth, then fifth in Britain but both cars were out of the points-earning positions at the German Grand Prix. (Note: Points were awarded to cars finishing in positions from first to sixth.)

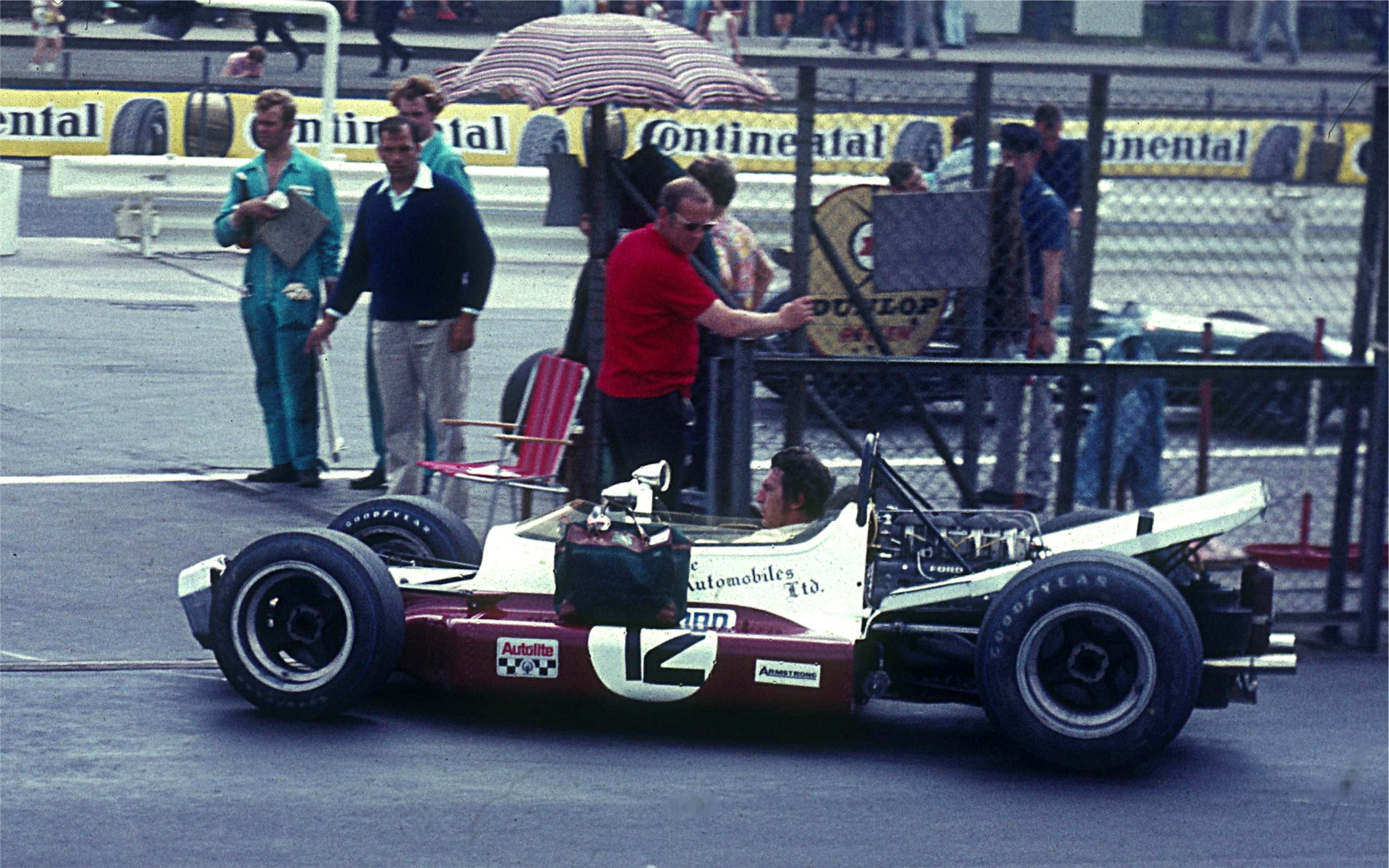
The M7B is seen here with Vic Elford in the cockpit at the 1969 German Grand Prix; he crashed in the race

An improvement in form came at the Italian Grand Prix where the cars ran without wings and Goodyear brought their new G9 specification tyre. McLaren qualified on the front row and led to begin with until he slowed at the scene of an accident and was caught by Stewart, Hulme and Jo Siffert in a Lotus. A slipstreaming battle ensued; McLaren retired with an oil leak at mid-distance but Hulme went on to win. From the Canadian Grand Prix onwards, a third M7A was driven by Dan Gurney whose Anglo American Racers team – for whom Bruce McLaren had driven for three races in 1967 – had run out of funding for their own Eagle cars. Gurney retired with overheating in Canada, but Hulme and McLaren continued their success by finishing first and second respectively, albeit after their strongest challengers had all retired. Hulme was then jointly in the lead of the Drivers' Championship with two races to go. He ran competitively towards the beginning of the United States Grand Prix but ultimately retired via a spin, pit stops to repair damaged brake lines and a gearbox output shaft failure which spun him again, this time into a crash. McLaren was sixth, Gurney fourth. Going into the final race in Mexico, Hulme retained a chance of defending his title. McLaren finished second there, but Hulme crashed out because of a broken suspension damper allowing Hill to win the Drivers' Championship.

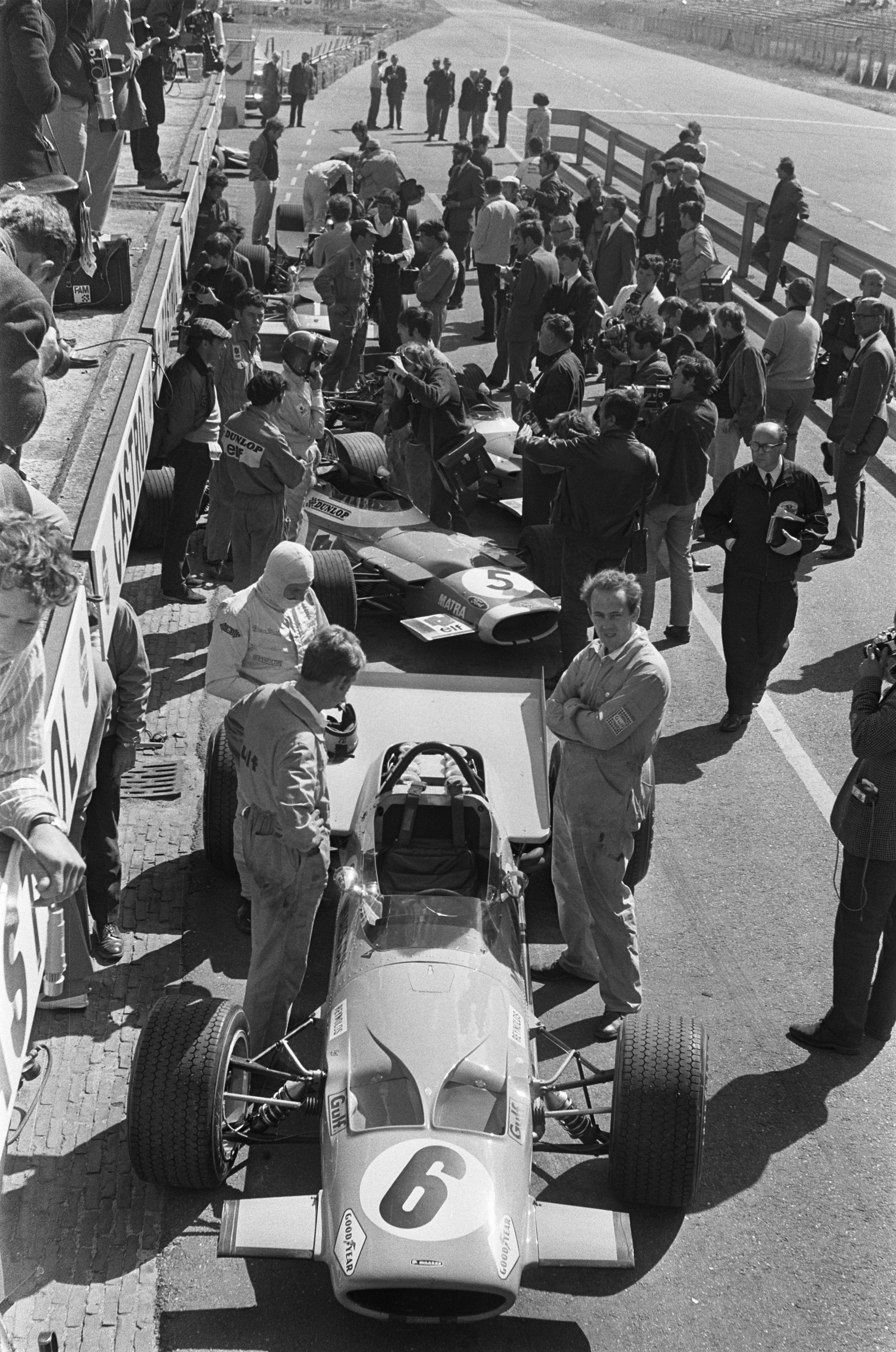
Bruce McLaren (white balaclava) prepares to take his seat in his M7C, prior to the 1969 Dutch Grand Prix

For 1969 McLaren, with an unchanged driver line-up, designed a new four-wheel drive car, the M9A, but whilst that was being readied, continued with the old car. The M9A was eventually unsuccessful and appeared only once, driven by Derek Bell at the British Grand Prix. At the South African Grand Prix Hulme scored a podium with the M7A; Bruce used the M7B version and the pair were joined by Basil van Rooyen in another M7A. In South Africa the works cars used rear wings mounted directly to the suspension on tall struts; at the Race of Champions Bruce McLaren's M7B was fitted with a similarly strutted front wing in the practice session but it was not used in the race. Hulme was third at the Race of Champions and then at International Trophy Bruce McLaren switched to the M7C variant. McLaren qualified 13th on the grid at the Spanish Grand Prix but took advantage of the crashes and breakdowns of those ahead of him to finish second. In the practice sessions at Monaco, high front wings were added to the cars but before the race the CSI banned wings altogether. This left the team to make do with a small "ducktail" rear spoiler, McLaren and Hulme racing to fifth and sixth respectively. Wings were then re-allowed, albeit not mounted on the suspension, and with teams searching for the best solution McLaren initially opted for a "tea tray" rear wing and later a more conventional, low-mounted aerofoil.

Meanwhile, the Colin Crabbe Antique Automobiles team bought the M7B and Vic Elford drove it at the Dutch Grand Prix, finishing 10th. McLaren was fourth, third and third at the French, British and German Grands Prix respectively, but in each Hulme, who qualified on the first row in France and Britain, was sidelined into retirement by mechanical failure. Elford took a best finish of fifth in France but then crashed and destroyed the M7B at the Nürburgring in Germany. The Italian Grand Prix at Monza produced another slipstreaming battle; this time McLaren finished fourth, albeit only 0.19 seconds behind winner Stewart. More unreliability in Canada and the United States restricted the cars to a best finish of fifth before, at the season ending Mexico race Hulme scored the M7's only win of the year.

With McLaren's introduction of the new M14A in 1970, the M7 had only one more works outing when Dan Gurney used an M7A at the 1970 British Grand Prix. Privateer John Surtees bought the M7C as a stopgap until his own Surtees TS7 car was ready. He raced it at four Grands Prix, retiring from three and finishing sixth in the Netherlands. The car then switched hands to Jo Bonnier who used it for two more races that year. The M7D was used intermittently with the M14D by Andrea de Adamich and Nanni Galli, qualifying for and starting only one race, the French Grand Prix where de Adamich finished unclassified. By 1971 the only type's only entrant was Bonnier with his M7C. He used it at five races and had a best result of 10th in the Italian Grand Prix.

=== World championship results table ===
(key)

Year	Team	Engine	Tyres	Drivers	1	2	3	4	5	6	7	8	9	10	11	12	13	Points	WCC
1968	Bruce McLaren Motor Racing	Ford Cosworth DFV 3.0 V8	G		RSA	ESP	MON	BEL	NED	FRA	GBR	GER	ITA	CAN	USA	MEX		49	2nd
1968	Bruce McLaren Motor Racing	Ford Cosworth DFV 3.0 V8	G	Bruce McLaren		Ret	Ret	1	Ret	8	7	13	Ret	2	6	2		49	2nd
1968	Bruce McLaren Motor Racing	Ford Cosworth DFV 3.0 V8	G	Denny Hulme		2	5	Ret	Ret	5	4	7	1	1	Ret	Ret		49	2nd
1968	Anglo American Racers	Ford Cosworth DFV 3.0 V8	G	Dan Gurney										Ret	4	Ret		49	2nd
1969	Bruce McLaren Motor Racing	Ford Cosworth DFV 3.0 V8	G		RSA	ESP	MON	NED	FRA	GBR	GER	ITA	CAN	USA	MEX			38	4th
1969	Bruce McLaren Motor Racing	Ford Cosworth DFV 3.0 V8	G	Bruce McLaren	5	2	5	Ret	4	3	3	4	5	DNS	DNS			38	4th
1969	Bruce McLaren Motor Racing	Ford Cosworth DFV 3.0 V8	G	Denny Hulme	3	4	6	4	8	Ret	Ret	7	Ret	Ret	1			38	4th
1969	Colin Crabbe Antique Automobiles	Ford Cosworth DFV 3.0 V8	G	Vic Elford				10	5	6	Ret							38	4th
1969	Team Lawson	Ford Cosworth DFV 3.0 V8	D	Basil van Rooyen	Ret													38	4th
1970	Bruce McLaren Motor Racing	Alfa Romeo 3.0 V8	G		RSA	ESP	MON	BEL	NED	FRA	GBR	GER	AUT	ITA	CAN	USA	MEX	0	9th (Note: Points were awarded separately for each combination of chassis and engine. Therefore McLaren-Ford were fifth in the world championship with 35 points whilst McLaren-Alfa Romeo were 9th with zero points. The McLaren-Ford total includes points scored with other models.)
1970	Bruce McLaren Motor Racing	Alfa Romeo 3.0 V8	G	Andrea de Adamich		DNQ	DNQ			NC	DNS							0	9th
1970	Bruce McLaren Motor Racing	Alfa Romeo 3.0 V8	G	Nanni Galli										DNQ				0	9th
1970	Ecurie Bonnier	Ford Cosworth DFV 3.0 V8	G	Jo Bonnier										DNQ		Ret		35	5th (Note: Points were awarded separately for each combination of chassis and engine. Therefore McLaren-Ford were fifth in the world championship with 35 points whilst McLaren-Alfa Romeo were 9th with zero points. The McLaren-Ford total includes points scored with other models.)
1970	Team Surtees	Ford Cosworth DFV 3.0 V8	F	John Surtees	Ret	Ret	Ret		6									35	5th
1971	Ecurie Bonnier	Ford Cosworth DFV 3.0 V8	G		RSA	ESP	MON	NED	FRA	GBR	GER	AUT	ITA	CAN	USA			10	6th (Note: All points were scored with other models.)
1971	Ecurie Bonnier	Ford Cosworth DFV 3.0 V8	G	Jo Bonnier	Ret						DNQ	DNS	10		16			10	6th
1971	Ecurie Bonnier	Ford Cosworth DFV 3.0 V8	G	Helmut Marko							DNS							10	6th
Refs																			

=== Non-championship results table ===
(key)

Year	Team	Engine	Tyres	Drivers	1	2	3	4	5	6	7	8
1968	Bruce McLaren Motor Racing	Ford Cosworth DFV 3.0 V8	G		ROC	INT	OUL					
1968	Bruce McLaren Motor Racing	Ford Cosworth DFV 3.0 V8	G	Bruce McLaren	1	2	DNA					
1968	Bruce McLaren Motor Racing	Ford Cosworth DFV 3.0 V8	G	Denny Hulme	3	1	DNA					
1969	Bruce McLaren Motor Racing	Ford Cosworth DFV 3.0 V8	G		ROC	INT	MAD	OUL				
1969	Bruce McLaren Motor Racing	Ford Cosworth DFV 3.0 V8	G	Bruce McLaren	Ret	6						
1969	Bruce McLaren Motor Racing	Ford Cosworth DFV 3.0 V8	G	Denny Hulme	3	Ret						
1970	Bruce McLaren Motor Racing	Alfa Romeo 3.0 V8	G		ROC	INT	OUL					
1970	Bruce McLaren Motor Racing	Alfa Romeo 3.0 V8	G	Andrea de Adamich		DNA						
1970	Bruce McLaren Motor Racing	Ford Cosworth DFV 3.0 V8	G	Peter Gethin	6							
1970	Bruce McLaren Motor Racing	Ford Cosworth DFV 3.0 V8	G	Reine Wisell		5						
1971	Ecurie Bonnier	Ford Cosworth DFV 3.0 V8	G		ARG	ROC	QUE	SPR	INT	RIN	OUL	VIC
1971	Ecurie Bonnier	Ford Cosworth DFV 3.0 V8	G	Carlos Reutemann	3							
1971	Ecurie Bonnier	Ford Cosworth DFV 3.0 V8	G	Jo Bonnier		DNA						
1971	A.G. Dean	Chevrolet 5.0 V8	?	Tony Dean					7			

== PC simulation ==
In 2005, a driveable, detailed replica of the McLaren M7B was released as part of the free '69 Mod' for the pc-based racing simulation Grand Prix Legends.
