= Colin Crabbe Racing =

Privateer auto racing team run by Colin Crabbe

- Full name: Colin Crabbe Racing aka Colin Crabbe - Antique Automobiles aka Antique Automobiles Racing Team
- Founder(s): Colin Crabbe
- Noted drivers: (United Kingdom) Vic Elford (Sweden) Ronnie Peterson

Formula One World Championship career
- First entry: 1969 Monaco Grand Prix
- Races entered: 14
- Constructors: Cooper; McLaren; March
- Engines: Maserati V12; Cosworth DFV V8
- Final entry: 1970 United States Grand Prix

Colin Crabbe Racing, also known as Colin Crabbe - Antique Automobiles and Antique Automobiles Racing Team, was a privateer auto racing team run by Colin Crabbe (14 April 1942 - 7 March 2025), a noted dealer in historic racing cars, that entered a single car in 17 Formula One races in 1969 and 1970. Vic Elford and Ronnie Peterson drove for the team, the cars used being a Cooper T86, a McLaren M7B and a March 701.

== Background ==
Colin Crabbe was a well-known collector and dealer of historic racing cars, having founded Antique Automobiles Ltd. in July 1964. He had bought a Maserati 250F in Australia from the father of Alan Jones, and located valuable old Alfa Romeo, Ferrari and Jaguar machinery in the last places they had been raced, in Latin America or Africa.

One of his most famous acquisitions, after having located an Alfa Romeo 8C and a Maserati 6C Monoposto, was the 1937 Mercedes-Benz W125 later owned by Bernie Ecclestone that had been hidden behind the Iron Curtain for three decades. In April 1968, he managed to get the car exported from East Germany.

In 1966 and 1967 he entered several sportscar races as a driver, first in an Aston Martin DB4 GT at Silverstone, then in a Ford GT40 in various races in Europe and southern Africa, his most notable result being an eighth place in the 1967 1000 km of Nürburgring with Roy Pierpoint as co-driver.

== 1969 season ==
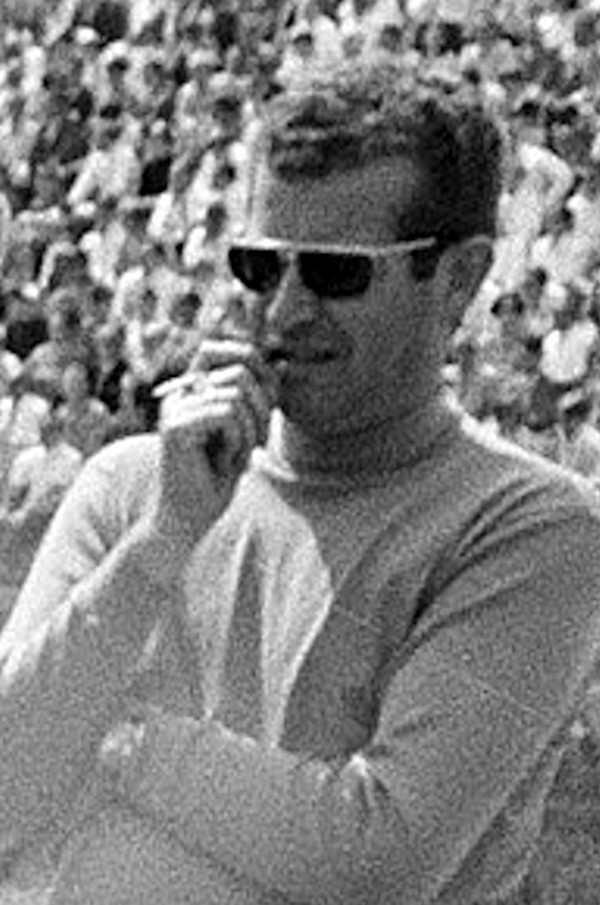
Colin Crabbe in 1969

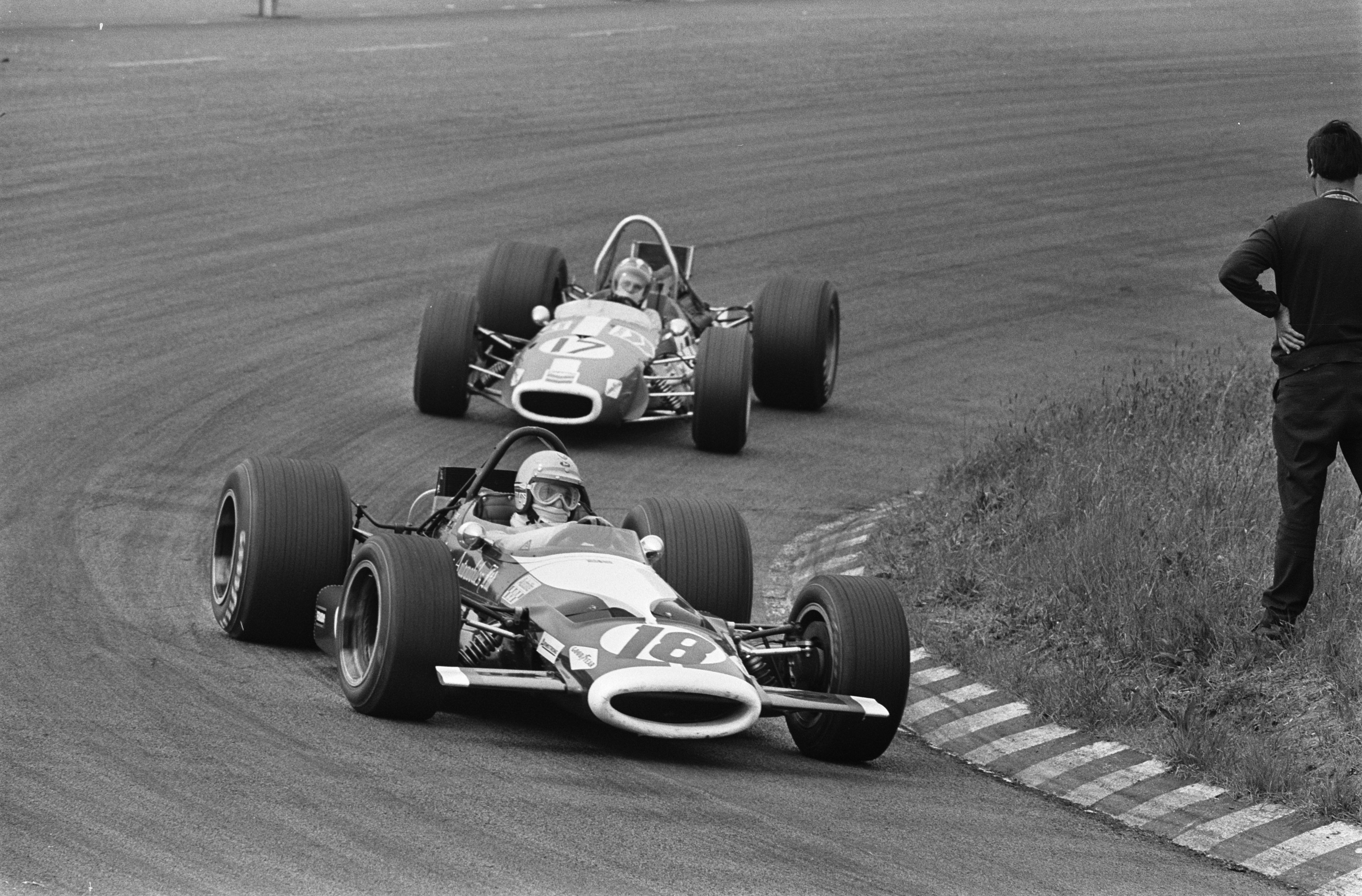
Elford's distinctive McLaren M7B at the 1969 Dutch Grand Prix

At the 1969 Race of Champions "Antique Automobiles" made what appears to be the first F1 entry for Colin Crabbe's team, with Roy Pike non-starting due to a fuel pump failure in a Climax-engined Brabham BT23B. A 1967 Cooper T86 Maserati was then entered at the International Trophy, Madrid Grand Prix and Monaco Grand Prix, Neil Corner driving in Spain and Vic Elford driving in the other two. Elford's Monaco entry was somewhat historic, marking the last F1 race for both Cooper as a constructor and Maserati as an engine supplier.

The McLaren M7B, an experimental version of the car with unique low-slung pannier fuel tanks, was then obtained along with a Cosworth DFV engine to replace the rather slow Cooper, which was sold to Swiss car collector Walter Grell. Elford drove the McLaren in a further four Grand Prix that year, finishing tenth at Zandvoort and finishing the next two races in the points with fifth at Clermont Ferrand and sixth at Silverstone. The German Grand Prix was the team's last F1 race that year, as Elford crashed out and wrote off the chassis.

== 1970 season ==
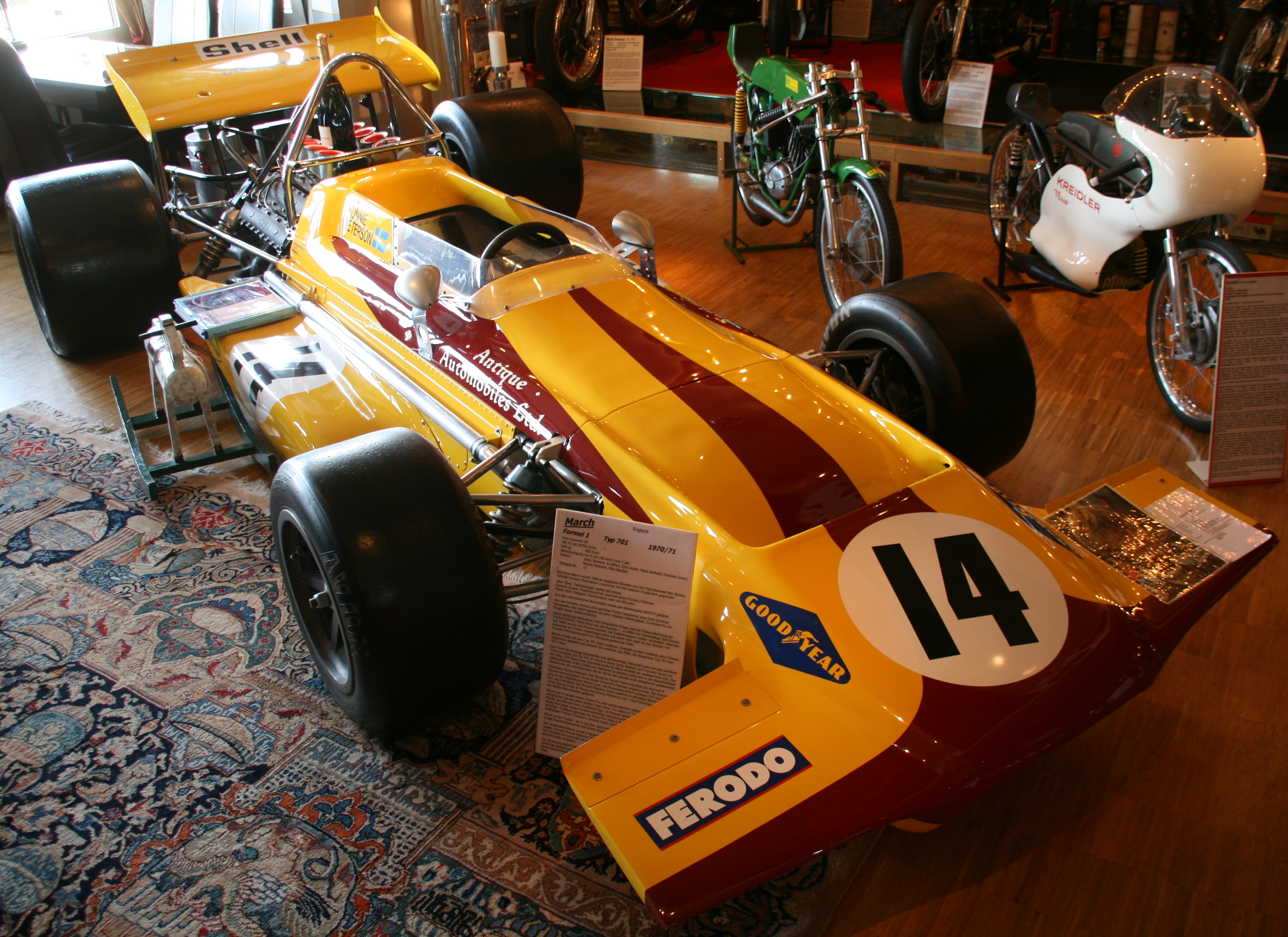
Peterson's 1970 March 701, in its original Antique Automobiles Ltd paint scheme

Having retained the DFV engine from the wrecked McLaren, Crabbe was approached by Max Mosley, one of the founders of new-for-1970 F1 constructor March, who offered to supply a March 701 chassis if Crabbe agreed to enter Ronnie Peterson, at that time a promising up-and-coming driver who had won the 1968 Swedish F3 championship and the 1969 Monaco F3 race. Crabbe accepted and Peterson drove in nine Grand Prix races for the team that season, which entered as "Antique Automobile Racing Team" in the first two races and "Colin Crabbe Racing" thereafter.

Chassis 701/8 first became available for the third race of 1970, but with the responsibility of looking after the team's one and only engine, as well as his shortcomings in setting up what turned out to be a difficult car, Peterson was unable to match the pace of the leading 701s driven by Stewart and Amon, although he did compare favourably with experienced works driver Jo Siffert. On his Formula One debut the Swede qualified twelfth and was the only March to finish, just out of the points in seventh.

That was to be Peterson's best result of the year, the remaining races yielding only two ninth places, two unclassified finishes and an eleventh-placed finish in the team's last race at the 1970 United States Grand Prix.

== After 1970 ==
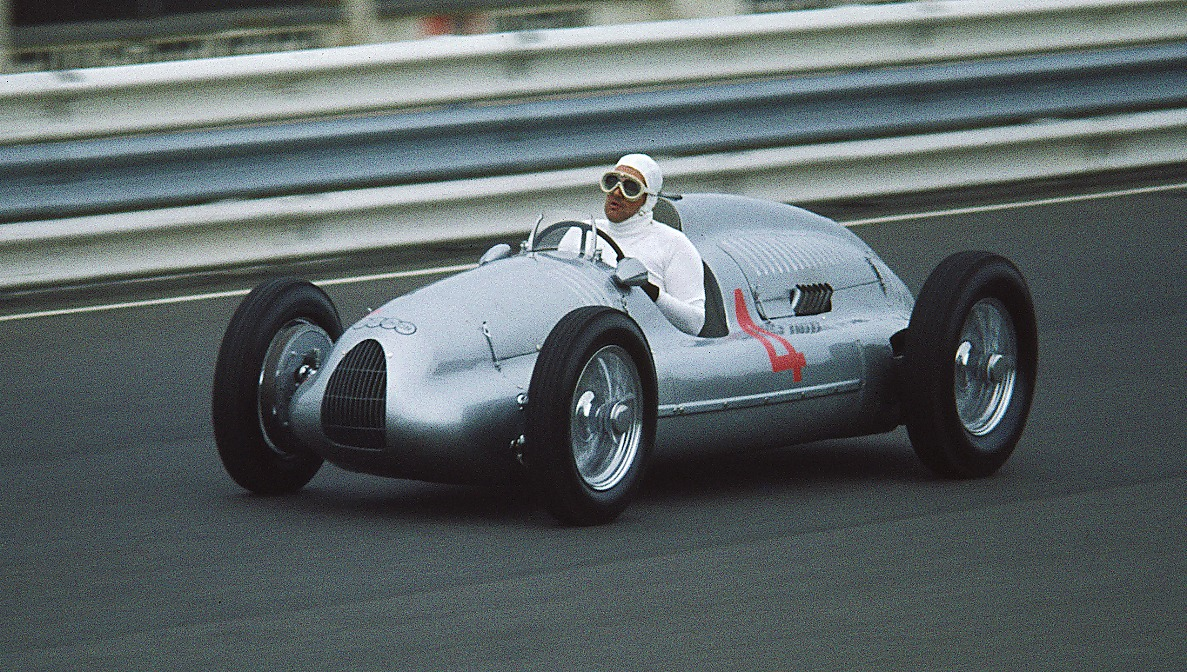
Crabbe in his Auto Union Type D in 1979

For 1971 Crabbe turned down an offer to run a privateer Ferrari 312, and opted not to continue racing. Crabbe said of his time in Formula One "I like to think I was the last of the serious privateers in F1, excluding Alexander Hesketh who was in a class apart, and Rob Walker, who had retired by then... I was under some serious pressure from family trustees to pack it in so decided to call it a day... Anyway two years of the most enormous fun and a great deal of experience learnt."

In 1977, he managed to find a race car of the other Silver Arrows brand, a 1938 Auto Union type D, with a chassis from Czechoslovakia and an engine from the GDR.

== Complete Formula One results ==
(key)(Races in italics indicate non-championship events)

1969	Chassis	Engine	Driver	RSA	ROC	INT	MAD	ESP	MON	NED	FRA	GBR	GER	IGC	ITA	CAN	USA	MEX		Points	WDC
1969	Brabham BT23B	Climax L4	(United States) Roy Pike		DNS															-	-
1969	Cooper T86	Maserati V12	(United Kingdom) Neil Corner				4													-	-
1969	Cooper T86	Maserati V12	(United Kingdom) Vic Elford			12			7											3	14th
1969	McLaren M7B	Cosworth DFV V8	(United Kingdom) Vic Elford							10	5	6	Ret							3	14th
1970	Chassis	Engine	Driver	RSA	ROC	ESP	INT	MON	BEL	NED	FRA	GBR	GER	AUT	IGC	ITA	CAN	USA	MEX	Points	WDC
1970	March 701	Cosworth DFV V8	(Sweden) Ronnie Peterson					7	NC	9	Ret	9	Ret			Ret	NC	11		0	-
