= 1968 Race of Champions =

- Non-championship race in the 1968 Formula One season

Race details
- Date: 17 March 1968
- Official name: III Race of Champions
- Location: Brands Hatch
- Course: Permanent racing facility
- Course length: 4.265 km (2.65 miles)
- Distance: 50 laps, 213.25 km (132.5 miles)

Pole position
Driver	(New Zealand) Bruce McLaren	McLaren-Cosworth
- Time: 1:30.0

Fastest lap
Driver	(New Zealand) Bruce McLaren	McLaren-Cosworth
- Time: 1:31.6

Podium
First	(New Zealand) Bruce McLaren	McLaren-Cosworth
Second	(Mexico) Pedro Rodríguez	BRM
Third	(New Zealand) Denny Hulme	McLaren-Cosworth

The 3rd Race of Champions was a non-championship Formula One motor race held on 17 March 1968 at Brands Hatch circuit in Kent, England. The race was run over 50 laps of the circuit, and was dominated by Bruce McLaren in a McLaren M7A, who started from pole position, set fastest lap and finished over 14 seconds ahead of Pedro Rodríguez's BRM P133. McLaren's teammate Denny Hulme was third in another McLaren M7A.

== Results ==
Pos.	No.	Driver	Entrant	Car	Time/Retired	Grid
1	2	(New Zealand) Bruce McLaren	Bruce McLaren Motor Racing Ltd	McLaren M7A-Cosworth	1.18:53.4	1
2	11	(Mexico) Pedro Rodríguez	Owen Racing Organisation	BRM P133	+ 14.2 s	7
3	1	(New Zealand) Denny Hulme	Bruce McLaren Motor Racing Ltd	McLaren M7A-Cosworth	+ 30.8 s	5
4	8	(New Zealand) Chris Amon	Scuderia Ferrari SpA SEFAC	Ferrari 312	+ 37.4 s	4
5	6	(United Kingdom) Brian Redman	Cooper Car Company	Cooper T86B-BRM	+ 1:27.2 s	10
6	15	(United Kingdom) Jackie Stewart	Matra International	Matra MS10-Cosworth	49 laps	3
7	23	(United Kingdom) Tony Lanfranchi	P & M Racing Preparations	Brabham BT23B-Climax	47 laps	14
8	9	(Belgium) Jacky Ickx	Scuderia Ferrari SpA SEFAC	Ferrari 312	46 laps	8
9	18	(United Kingdom) David Hobbs	Bernard White Racing	BRM P261	43 laps	13
NC	20	(United Kingdom) Peter Gethin	Frank Lythgoe Racing	Brabham BT21-BMW	36 laps	15
Ret	17	(Sweden) Jo Bonnier	Ecurie Bonnier	McLaren M5A-BRM	30 laps - steering / suspension	12
Ret	12	(United Kingdom) Mike Spence	Owen Racing Organisation	BRM P126	18 laps - oil line	2
Ret	4	(United Kingdom) Graham Hill	Team Lotus Ltd	Lotus 49-Cosworth	11 laps - driveshaft	6
Ret	19	(Switzerland) Silvio Moser	Charles Vögele Racing Team	Brabham BT20-Repco	7 laps - oil pressure	11
DNS	21	(United Kingdom) John Surtees	Lola Cars Ltd	Lola T100-BMW	Oil line	(9)
DNS	10	(Italy) Andrea de Adamich	Scuderia Ferrari SpA SEFAC	Ferrari 312	Accident	-
DNS	16	(Switzerland) Jo Siffert	Rob Walker Racing Team	Lotus 49-Cosworth	Practice accident	-

Previous race: 1967 Spanish Grand Prix	Formula One non-championship races 1968 season	Next race: 1968 BRDC International Trophy
Previous race: 1967 Race of Champions	Race of Champions	Next race: 1969 Race of Champions
