= 1969 Race of Champions =

- Non-championship race in the 1969 Formula One season

Race details
- Date: 16 March 1969
- Official name: IV Race of Champions
- Location: Brands Hatch
- Course: Permanent racing facility
- Course length: 4.265 km (2.65 miles)
- Distance: 50 laps, 213.25 km (132.5 miles)
- Weather: Wet and foggy (practice), cold and windy (race)

Pole position
Driver	(United Kingdom) Graham Hill	Lotus-Cosworth
- Time: 1:28.2

Fastest lap
Driver	(Austria) Jochen Rindt	Lotus-Cosworth
- Time: 1:26.8

Podium
First	(United Kingdom) Jackie Stewart	Matra-Cosworth
Second	(United Kingdom) Graham Hill	Lotus-Cosworth
Third	(New Zealand) Denny Hulme	McLaren-Cosworth

The 4th Race of Champions was a non-Championship motor race, run to Formula One rules, held on 16 March 1969 at Brands Hatch circuit in Kent, England. The race was run over 50 laps of the circuit, and was won by Jackie Stewart in a Matra MS80.

== Results ==
=== Qualifying ===
Pos	No.	Driver	Team	Car	Time	Gap
1	1	(United Kingdom) Graham Hill	Gold Leaf Team Lotus	Lotus 49B-Cosworth	1:28.2	-
2	7	(United Kingdom) Jackie Stewart	Matra International	Matra MS80-Cosworth	1:28.3	+0.1
3	14	(Switzerland) Jo Siffert	Rob Walker/Jack Durlacher Racing	Lotus 49B-Cosworth	1:29.3	+1.1
4	2	(Austria) Jochen Rindt	Gold Leaf Team Lotus	Lotus 49B-Cosworth	1:29.4	+1.2
5	5	(Australia) Jack Brabham	Brabham Racing Organisation	Brabham BT26A-Cosworth	1:29.5	+1.3
6	4	(New Zealand) Bruce McLaren	Bruce McLaren Motor Racing	McLaren M7B-Cosworth	1:30.4	+2.2
7	3	(New Zealand) Denny Hulme	Bruce McLaren Motor Racing	McLaren M7A-Cosworth	1:32.5	+4.3
8	11	(United Kingdom) Jackie Oliver	Owen Racing Organisation	BRM P133	1:33.8	+5.6
9	15	(United States) Pete Lovely	Pete Lovely Volkswagen	Lotus 49B-Cosworth	1:36.4	+8.2
10	6	(Belgium) Jacky Ickx	Brabham Racing Organisation	Brabham BT26A-Cosworth	1:39.1	+10.9
11	12	(Mexico) Pedro Rodríguez	Reg Parnell Racing	BRM P126	1:41.3	+13.1
12	16	(United Kingdom) Piers Courage	Frank Williams Racing Cars	Brabham BT26A-Cosworth	no time	-
13	18	(United States) Roy Pike	Antique Automobiles Racing Team	Brabham BT23B-Climax	no time	-
-	10	(United Kingdom) John Surtees	Owen Racing Organisation	BRM P138	no time - accident	-

=== Race ===
Pos	Driver	Car	Laps	Time/Ret.
1	(United Kingdom) Jackie Stewart	Matra-Cosworth	50	1.13:10.4
2	(United Kingdom) Graham Hill	Lotus-Cosworth	50	+ 7.0s
3	(New Zealand) Denny Hulme	McLaren-Cosworth	50	+ 57.9s
4	(Switzerland) Jo Siffert	Lotus-Cosworth	50	+ 1m 16.3s
5	(United Kingdom) Jackie Oliver	BRM	48	+2 laps
6	(United States) Pete Lovely	Lotus-Cosworth	46	+4 laps
Ret	(Austria) Jochen Rindt	Lotus-Cosworth	38	Oil pressure
Ret	(Mexico) Pedro Rodríguez	BRM	32	Engine
Ret	(Belgium) Jacky Ickx	Brabham-Cosworth	23	Metering unit
Ret	(Australia) Jack Brabham	Brabham-Cosworth	19	Ignition
Ret	(United Kingdom) Piers Courage	Brabham-Cosworth	18	Split tank
Ret	(New Zealand) Bruce McLaren	McLaren-Cosworth	12	Ignition
DNS	(United States) Roy Pike	Brabham-Climax	-	Fuel pump
DNS	(United Kingdom) John Surtees	BRM	-	Practice accident

Previous race: 1968 International Gold Cup	Formula One non-championship races 1969 season	Next race: 1969 BRDC International Trophy
Previous race: 1968 Race of Champions	Race of Champions	Next race: 1970 Race of Champions
