= 1969 BRDC International Trophy =

1969 BRDC International Trophy Grand Prix
- Non-championship race in the 1969 Formula One season
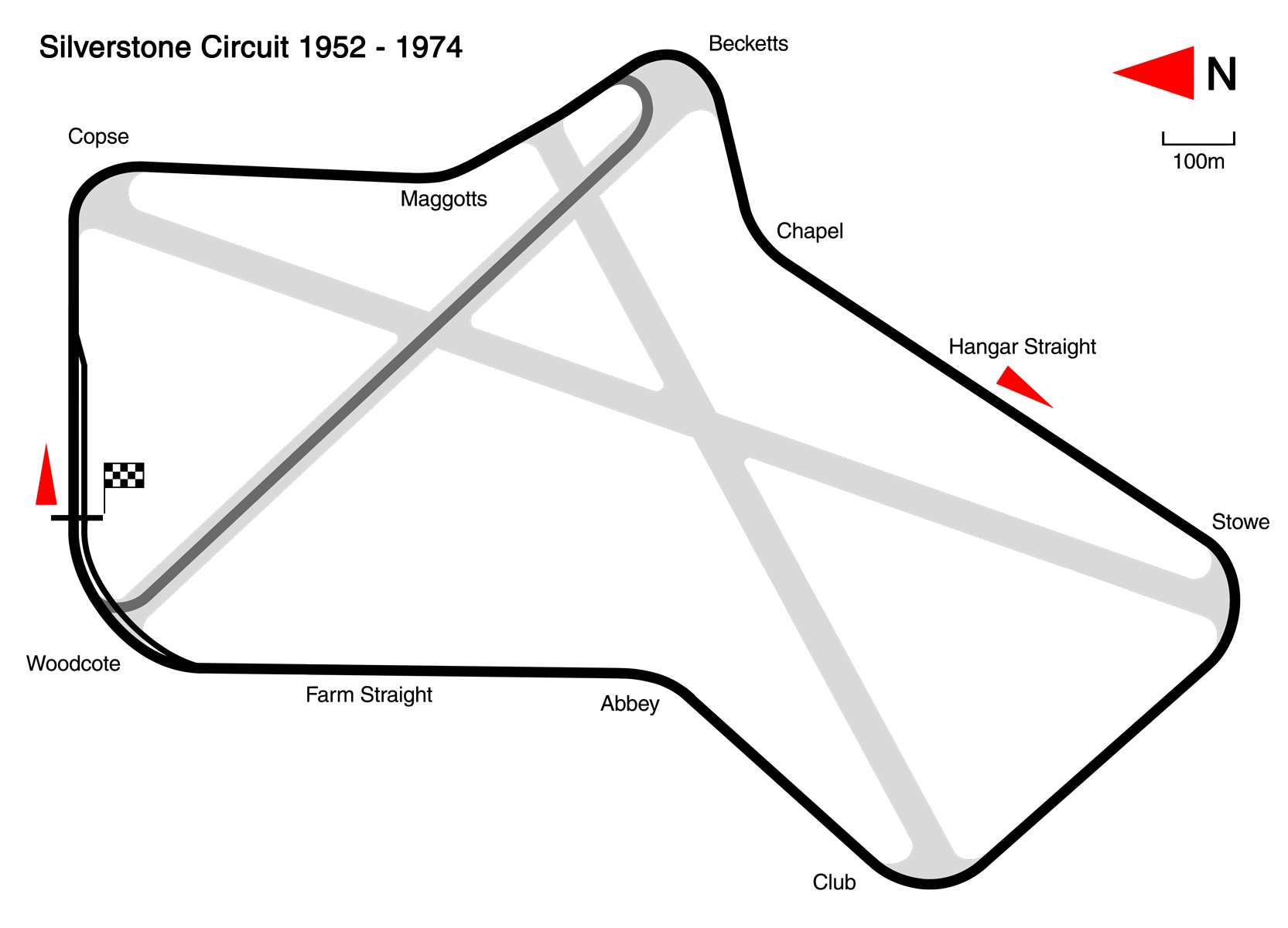
- The Silverstone Circuit (1952–1974)

Race details
- Date: 30 March 1969
- Official name: XXI BRDC Daily Express International Trophy
- Location: Silverstone Circuit, Northamptonshire and Buckinghamshire, England
- Course: Permanent racing facility
- Course length: 4.7 km (2.9 miles)
- Distance: 52 laps, 242.8 km (150.8 miles)
- Weather: Wet

Pole position
Driver	(United Kingdom) Jackie Stewart	Matra-Cosworth
- Time: 1:20.9

Fastest lap
Driver	(Austria) Jochen Rindt	Lotus-Cosworth
- Time: 1:30.15

Podium
First	(Australia) Jack Brabham	Brabham-Cosworth
Second	(Austria) Jochen Rindt	Lotus-Cosworth
Third	(United Kingdom) Jackie Stewart	Matra-Cosworth

The 21st BRDC International Trophy was a non-championship Formula One race held at Silverstone on 30 March 1969. The race was run over 52 laps of the circuit and was won by Jack Brabham in a Brabham BT26A.

== Race report ==
Jackie Stewart qualified the Matra MS80 on pole, but opted to drive the previous season's MS10 and so started from the back of the grid. Jack Brabham led from start to finish, but suffered from fuel starvation in the closing stages and finished only seconds ahead of Jochen Rindt, who had suffered from water in the ignition system at the start and dropped back to tenth place, subsequently setting fastest lap in his Lotus 49B as he worked his way through the field. Jackie Stewart finished third, narrowly ahead of Jacky Ickx.

== Classification ==
=== Qualifying ===
Pos	No.	Driver	Team	Car	Time	Gap
1	7	(United Kingdom) Jackie Stewart	Matra International	Matra MS80-Cosworth	1:20.9	-
2	8	(Australia) Jack Brabham	Brabham Racing Organisation	Brabham BT26A-Cosworth	1:21.0	+0.1
3	20	(New Zealand) Chris Amon	Scuderia Ferrari	Ferrari 312	1:21.1	+0.2
4	9	(Belgium) Jacky Ickx	Brabham Racing Organisation	Brabham BT26A-Cosworth	1:22.5	+1.6
5	16	(United Kingdom) Piers Courage	Frank Williams Racing Cars	Brabham BT26A-Cosworth	1:22.9	+2.0
6	12	(Switzerland) Jo Siffert	Rob Walker/Jack Durlacher Racing	Lotus 49B-Cosworth	1:22.9	+2.0
7	4	(New Zealand) Bruce McLaren	Bruce McLaren Motor Racing	McLaren M7C-Cosworth	1:23.2	+2.3
8	2	(Austria) Jochen Rindt	Gold Leaf Team Lotus	Lotus 49B-Cosworth	1:23.9	+3.0
9	10	(United Kingdom) Derek Bell	Scuderia Ferrari	Ferrari 312	1:24.1	+3.2
10	1	(United Kingdom) Graham Hill	Gold Leaf Team Lotus	Lotus 49B-Cosworth	1:26.2	+5.3
11	11	(Mexico) Pedro Rodríguez	Reg Parnell Racing	BRM P126	1:26.8	+5.9
12	17	(United States) Pete Lovely	Pete Lovely Volkswagen	Lotus 49B-Cosworth	1:30.0	+9.1
13	14	(United Kingdom) Vic Elford	Antique Automobiles Racing Team	Cooper T86B-Maserati	1:30.0	+9.1
14	3	(New Zealand) Denny Hulme	Bruce McLaren Motor Racing	McLaren M7A-Cosworth	1:31.2	+10.2

=== Race ===
Pos	Driver	Car	Laps	Time/Ret.
1	(Australia) Jack Brabham	Brabham-Cosworth	52	1:25:20.8
2	(Austria) Jochen Rindt	Lotus-Cosworth	52	+2.2 s
3	(United Kingdom) Jackie Stewart	Matra-Cosworth	52	+1m 10.9s
4	(Belgium) Jacky Ickx	Brabham-Cosworth	52	+1m 13.5s
5	(United Kingdom) Piers Courage	Brabham-Cosworth	51	+ 1 Lap
6	(New Zealand) Bruce McLaren	McLaren-Cosworth	51	+ 1 Lap
7	(United Kingdom) Graham Hill	Lotus-Cosworth	50	+ 2 Laps
8	(Mexico) Pedro Rodríguez	BRM	50	+ 2 Laps
9	(United Kingdom) Derek Bell	Ferrari	49	+ 3 Laps
10	(New Zealand) Chris Amon	Ferrari	47	+ 5 Laps
11	(Switzerland) Jo Siffert	Lotus-Cosworth	47	+ 5 laps
12	(United Kingdom) Vic Elford	Cooper-Maserati	47	+ 5 Laps
Ret	(New Zealand) Denny Hulme	McLaren-Cosworth	17	Engine
Ret	(United States) Pete Lovely	Lotus-Cosworth	2	Accident

Previous race: 1969 Race of Champions	Formula One non-championship races 1969 season	Next race: 1969 Madrid Grand Prix
Previous race: 1968 BRDC International Trophy	BRDC International Trophy	Next race: 1970 BRDC International Trophy
