= 1967 BRDC International Trophy =

The 19th BRDC International Trophy was a non-championship Formula One race held at Silverstone on 29 April 1967.

== Classification ==
Pos	Driver	Constructor	Laps	Time/Ret.	Grid
1	(United Kingdom) Mike Parkes	Ferrari	52	1:19:39.2	2
2	(Australia) Jack Brabham	Brabham-Repco	52	+ 17.6 s	6
3	(Switzerland) Jo Siffert	Cooper-Maserati	52	+ 18.4 s	5
4	(United Kingdom) Graham Hill	Lotus-BRM	51	+ 1 lap	8
5	(New Zealand) Bruce McLaren	McLaren-BRM	51	+ 1 lap	9
6	(United Kingdom) Mike Spence	BRM	50	+ 2 laps	3
7	(United Kingdom) Chris Irwin	Lotus-BRM	50	+ 2 laps	11
8	(United Kingdom) Bob Anderson	Brabham-Climax	49	+ 3 laps	7
Ret	(France) Guy Ligier	Cooper-Maserati	28	Engine	12
Ret	(Sweden) Jo Bonnier	Cooper-Maserati	16	Fuel tank	10
Ret	(United Kingdom) Jackie Stewart	BRM	15	Transmission	1
Ret	(New Zealand) Denny Hulme	Brabham-Repco	3	Oil leak	4
DNS	(United States) Earl Jones	Pearce-Martin		Transporter fire	
DNS	(United Kingdom) Tony Lanfranchi	Pearce-Martin		Transporter fire	
DNS	(United Kingdom) Robin Darlington	Cooper-Ferrari		Transporter fire	

== Notes ==
- Fastest lap: Graham Hill - 1:30.0

Previous race: 1967 Spring Cup	Formula One non-championship races 1967 season	Next race: 1967 Syracuse Grand Prix
Previous race: 1966 BRDC International Trophy	BRDC International Trophy	Next race: 1968 BRDC International Trophy
