= 1967 Race of Champions =

- Non-championship race in the 1967 Formula One season

Race details
- Date: 12 March 1967
- Official name: II Race of Champions
- Location: Brands Hatch
- Course: Permanent racing facility
- Course length: 4.265 km (2.65 miles)
- Distance: 2 x 10 (heats) & 1 x 40 (final) laps, 2 x 42.65 & 1 x 170.603 km (2 x 26.5 & 1 x 106 miles)

Pole position
Driver	(United States) Dan Gurney	Eagle-Weslake
- Time: 1:32.2

Fastest lap
Driver	(United States) Dan Gurney	Eagle-Weslake
- Time: 1:32.6 (both heats)

Podium
First	(United States) Dan Gurney	Eagle-Weslake
Second	(Italy) Lorenzo Bandini	Ferrari
Third	(Switzerland) Jo Siffert	Cooper-Maserati

The 2nd Race of Champions was a non-Championship motor race, run to Formula One rules, held on 12 March 1967 at Brands Hatch circuit in Kent, England. The race was run over two heats of 10 laps of the circuit, then a final of 40 laps, and was won overall by Dan Gurney in an Eagle Mk1.

The grid positions for the first heat were decided by a qualifying session, and the grid for the second heat was determined by the finishing order of the first heat. Similarly, the finishing order for the second heat decided the grid order for the final, although some positions were apparently changed.

Gurney won both heats and the final, taking fastest lap in both heats. The fastest lap of the final was driven by Jack Brabham, although it was slower than Gurney's laps in the heats.

== Results ==
=== Heat 1 ===
Pos.	No.	Driver	Entrant	Constructor	Time/Retired	Grid
1	5	(United States) Dan Gurney	Anglo American Racers	Eagle-Weslake	15:42.8	1
2	7	(United Kingdom) John Surtees	Honda R & D Co.	Honda	+ 9.0 s	2
3	6	(United States) Richie Ginther	Anglo American Racers	Eagle-Weslake	+ 12.2 s	3
4	11	(New Zealand) Bruce McLaren	Bruce McLaren Motor Racing Ltd	McLaren-BRM	+ 13.2 s	4
5	15	(United Kingdom) Mike Spence	Reg Parnell (Racing)	BRM	+ 14.8 s	8
6	10	(Italy) Ludovico Scarfiotti	Scuderia Ferrari SpA SEFAC	Ferrari	+ 16.2 s	7
7	1	(Australia) Jack Brabham	Brabham Racing Organisation	Brabham-Repco	+ 17.2 s	5
8	4	(Mexico) Pedro Rodríguez	Cooper Car Company	Cooper-Maserati	+ 17.8 s	10
9	2	(New Zealand) Denny Hulme	Brabham Racing Organisation	Brabham-Repco	+ 20.4 s	13
10	9	(Italy) Lorenzo Bandini	Scuderia Ferrari SpA SEFAC	Ferrari	+ 20.6 s	11
11	12	(Switzerland) Jo Siffert	Rob Walker Racing Team	Cooper-Maserati	+ 22.0 s	12
12	21	(Belgium) Jacky Ickx	Matra Sports	Matra-Cosworth	+ 36.6 s	17
13	23	(United Kingdom) Chris Irwin	Reg Parnell (Racing)	Lotus-BRM	+ 36.8 s	15
14	16	(United Kingdom) Bob Anderson	DW Racing Enterprises	Brabham-Climax	+ 41.2 s	16
15	20	(France) Jean-Pierre Beltoise	Matra Sports	Matra-Cosworth	+ 49.0 s	20
16	14	(France) Guy Ligier	Guy Ligier	Cooper-Maserati	+ 1:16.2 s	18
17	19	(United Kingdom) Chris Lawrence	J.A. Pearce Engineering	Cooper-Ferrari	+ 1:22.4 s	19
NC	3	(Austria) Jochen Rindt	Cooper Car Company	Cooper-Maserati	4 laps	6
DNS	8	(New Zealand) Chris Amon	Scuderia Ferrari SpA SEFAC	Ferrari	Driver injured	(9)
DNS	22	(United Kingdom) Piers Courage	Charles Lucas (Engineering)	Lotus-Martin	Engine in practice	(14)
WD	8	(United Kingdom) Mike Parkes	Scuderia Ferrari SpA SEFAC	Ferrari	Car driven by Amon	-
WD	17	(United Kingdom) Robin Darlington	J.A. Pearce Engineering	Pearce-Martin	Car not ready	-
WD	18	(United Kingdom) Tony Lanfranchi	J.A. Pearce Engineering	Pearce-Martin	Car not ready	-

=== Heat 2 ===
Pos.	No.	Driver	Entrant	Constructor	Time/Retired	Grid
1	5	(United States) Dan Gurney	Anglo American Racers	Eagle-Weslake	15:39.2	1
2	6	(United States) Richie Ginther	Anglo American Racers	Eagle-Weslake	+ 3.4 s	3
3	7	(United Kingdom) John Surtees	Honda R & D Co.	Honda	+ 4.2 s	2
4	10	(Italy) Ludovico Scarfiotti	Scuderia Ferrari SpA SEFAC	Ferrari	+ 5.6 s	6
5	4	(Mexico) Pedro Rodríguez	Cooper Car Company	Cooper-Maserati	+ 12.8 s	8
6	11	(New Zealand) Bruce McLaren	Bruce McLaren Motor Racing Ltd	McLaren-BRM	+ 16.0 s	4
7	15	(United Kingdom) Mike Spence	Reg Parnell (Racing)	BRM	+ 16.4 s	5
8	12	(Switzerland) Jo Siffert	Rob Walker Racing Team	Cooper-Maserati	+ 19.2 s	11
9	9	(Italy) Lorenzo Bandini	Scuderia Ferrari SpA SEFAC	Ferrari	+ 26.8 s	10
10	21	(Belgium) Jacky Ickx	Matra Sports	Matra-Cosworth	+ 41.0 s	12
11	23	(United Kingdom) Chris Irwin	Reg Parnell (Racing)	Lotus-BRM	+ 41.8 s	13
12	16	(United Kingdom) Bob Anderson	DW Racing Enterprises	Brabham-Climax	+ 42.6 s	15
Ret	20	(France) Jean-Pierre Beltoise	Matra Sports	Matra-Cosworth	8 laps - fuel injection	14
Ret	2	(New Zealand) Denny Hulme	Brabham Racing Organisation	Brabham-Repco	5 laps - engine	9
NC	14	(France) Guy Ligier	Guy Ligier	Cooper-Maserati	3 laps	16
Ret	1	(Australia) Jack Brabham	Brabham Racing Organisation	Brabham-Repco	1 lap - fuel starvation	7
Ret	3	(Austria) Jochen Rindt	Cooper Car Company	Cooper-Maserati	0 laps - clutch	18
Ret	19	(United Kingdom) Chris Lawrence	J.A. Pearce Engineering	Cooper-Ferrari	0 laps - clutch	17

=== Final ===
Pos.	No.	Driver	Entrant	Constructor	Time/Retired	Grid
1	5	(United States) Dan Gurney	Anglo American Racers	Eagle-Weslake	1.04:30.6	1
2	9	(Italy) Lorenzo Bandini	Scuderia Ferrari SpA SEFAC	Ferrari	+ 0.4 s	11
3	12	(Switzerland) Jo Siffert	Rob Walker Racing Team	Cooper-Maserati	+ 2.0 s	8
4	4	(Mexico) Pedro Rodríguez	Cooper Car Company	Cooper-Maserati	+ 2.8 s	5
5	10	(Italy) Ludovico Scarfiotti	Scuderia Ferrari SpA SEFAC	Ferrari	+ 4.2 s	4
6	23	(United Kingdom) Chris Irwin	Reg Parnell (Racing)	Lotus-BRM	39 laps	13
7	15	(United Kingdom) Mike Spence	Reg Parnell (Racing)	BRM	39 laps	7
8	19	(United Kingdom) Chris Lawrence	J.A. Pearce Engineering	Cooper-Ferrari	38 laps	17
9	1	(Australia) Jack Brabham	Brabham Racing Organisation	Brabham-Repco	37 laps	9
10	6	(United States) Richie Ginther	Anglo American Racers	Eagle-Weslake	36 laps	2
Ret	20	(France) Jean-Pierre Beltoise	Matra Sports	Matra-Cosworth	20 laps - fuel injection	15
Ret	21	(Belgium) Jacky Ickx	Matra Sports	Matra-Cosworth	19 laps - fuel pump	12
Ret	3	(Austria) Jochen Rindt	Cooper Car Company	Cooper-Maserati	14 laps - clutch	18
Ret	16	(United Kingdom) Bob Anderson	DW Racing Enterprises	Brabham-Climax	10 laps - electrics	14
Ret	7	(United Kingdom) John Surtees	Honda R & D Co.	Honda	8 laps - throttle	3
Ret	11	(New Zealand) Bruce McLaren	Bruce McLaren Motor Racing Ltd	McLaren-BRM	0 laps - engine	6
DNS	2	(New Zealand) Denny Hulme	Brabham Racing Organisation	Brabham-Repco	Engine in heat 2	(10)
DNS	14	(France) Guy Ligier	Guy Ligier	Cooper-Maserati	Car driven by Rindt	(16)
Sources:

- Jochen Rindt was entered in a Cooper T81B which he used in the heats, and he used Guy Ligier's T81 for the final.
- As well as his Lotus-BRM, Chris Irwin was entered in a Lola-BMW which was not used.

Previous race: 1966 International Gold Cup	Formula One non-championship races 1967 season	Next race: 1967 Spring Cup
Previous race: 1965 Race of Champions	Race of Champions	Next race: 1968 Race of Champions
