= 1968 BRDC International Trophy =

- Non-championship race in the 1968 Formula One season
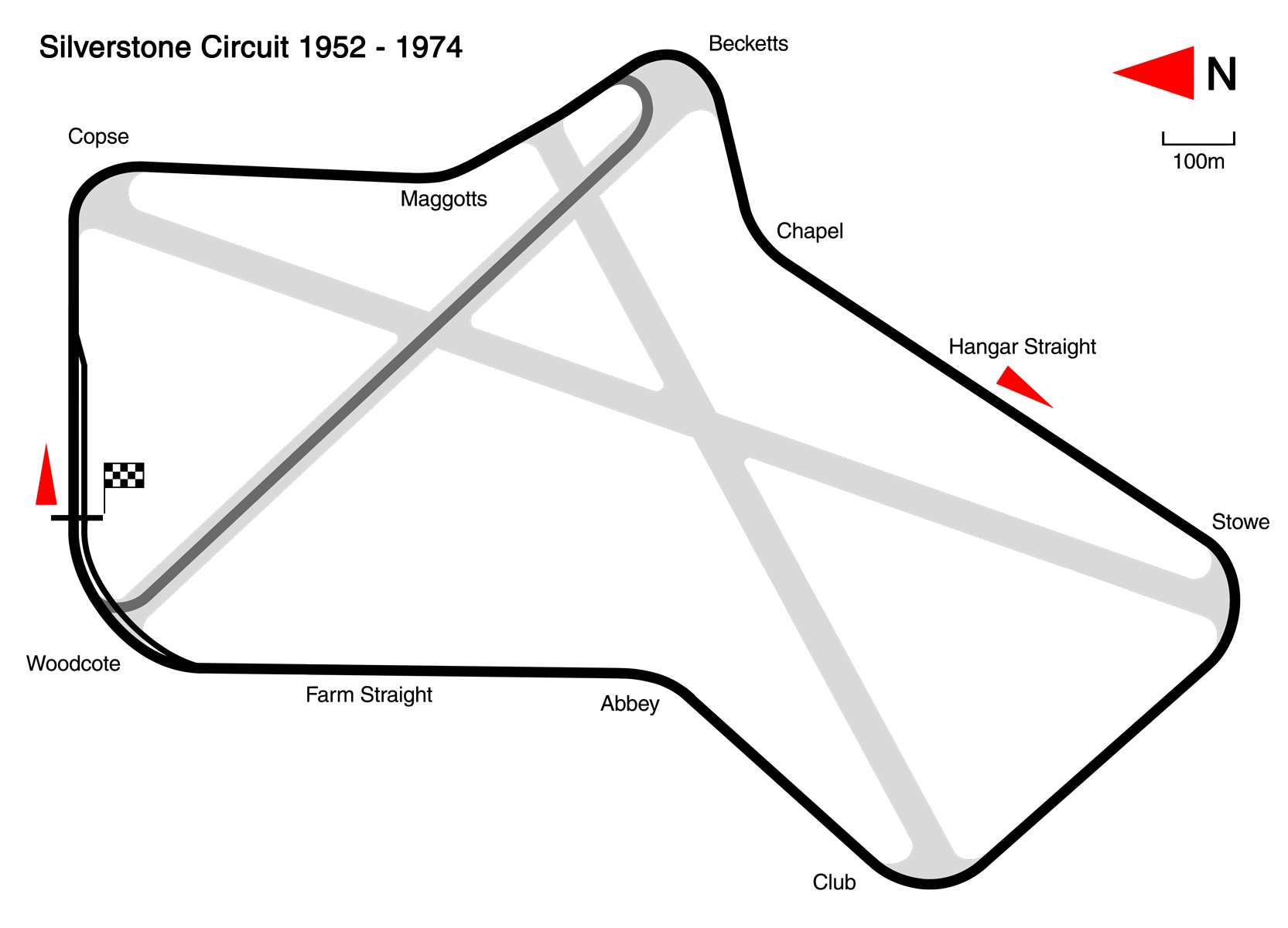

Race details
- Date: 25 April 1968
- Official name: XX BRDC International Trophy
- Location: Silverstone
- Course: Permanent racing facility
- Course length: 4.710 km (2.927 miles)
- Distance: 52 laps, 224.920 km (139.675 miles)

Pole position
Driver	(New Zealand) Denny Hulme	McLaren-Ford
- Time: 1:24.3

Fastest lap
Driver	(New Zealand) Chris Amon	Ferrari
- Time: 1:25.1

Podium
First	(New Zealand) Denny Hulme	McLaren-Ford
Second	(New Zealand) Bruce McLaren	McLaren-Ford
Third	(New Zealand) Chris Amon	Ferrari

The 20th BRDC International Trophy was a non-championship Formula One race held at Silverstone on 25 April 1968.

== Report ==
=== Entry ===
A total of 15 F1 cars were entered for the event, with Tony Lanfranchi due to make his F1 debut.

=== Qualifying ===
Denny Hulme took pole position for Bruce McLaren Motor Racing team, in their McLaren-Cosworth M7A, averaging a speed of 127.635 mph, around the 2.927 mile course. He was joined on the front row by Mike Spence with his BRM P126, together with Bruce McLaren and Pedro Rodríguez in the second works BRM. This race was the last time an F1 event began with a 4-3-4-3 format starting grid.

=== Race ===
The race was held over 52 laps of the Silverstone circuit. Denny Hulme took the winner spoils for works McLaren team, driving their McLaren-Cosworth M7A. Hulme won in a time of 1hr 14:44.8mins., averaging a speed of 124.744 mph. Around 10.9 seconds behind was the second place car, that of his team-mate and team owner, Bruce McLaren. The podium was completed by another Kiwi, Chris Amon, giving New Zealand a podium lock-out. Amon was 5.6 seconds adrift off McLaren in his Ferrari 312. With the second Ferrari in fourth, driven by Jacky Ickx, the first English driver home was Piers Courage in his privately entered BRM P126, albeit one lap down.

== Classification ==
Pos	No	Driver	Constructor	Laps	Time/Ret.
1	1	(New Zealand) Denny Hulme	McLaren-Ford	52	1:14:44.8
2	2	(New Zealand) Bruce McLaren	McLaren-Ford	52	+ 10.9 s
3	20	(New Zealand) Chris Amon	Ferrari	52	
4	6	(Belgium) Jacky Ickx	Ferrari	52	
5	9	(United Kingdom) Piers Courage	BRM	51	+ 1 Lap
6	16	(United Kingdom) David Hobbs	BRM	50	+ 2 Laps
7	15	(Switzerland) Silvio Moser	Brabham-Repco	49	+ 3 Laps
Ret	7	(United Kingdom) Mike Spence	BRM	40	Timing Gear
Ret	8	(Mexico) Pedro Rodríguez	BRM	36	Fuel pressure
Ret	12	(Switzerland) Jo Siffert	Lotus-Ford	26	Clutch
Ret	11	(Australia) Frank Gardner	Cooper-BRM	23	Engine
Ret	18	(United Kingdom) Tony Lanfranchi	Brabham-Climax	20	Oil pressure
Ret	5	(United Kingdom) Graham Hill	Lotus-Ford	12	Fuel pipe
Ret	14	(Sweden) Jo Bonnier	McLaren-BRM	4	Distributor
DNS	17	(United Kingdom) Trevor Taylor	McLaren-Climax		

Previous race: 1968 Race of Champions	Formula One non-championship races 1968 season	Next race: 1968 International Gold Cup
Previous race: 1967 BRDC International Trophy	BRDC International Trophy	Next race: 1969 BRDC International Trophy
