= 1970 Race of Champions =

- Non-championship race in the 1970 Formula One season

Race details
- Date: 22 March 1970
- Official name: V Race of Champions
- Location: Brands Hatch
- Course: Permanent racing facility
- Course length: 4.265 km (2.65 miles)
- Distance: 50 laps, 213.25 km (132.5 miles)

Pole position
Driver	(United Kingdom) Jackie Stewart	March-Cosworth
- Time: 1:25.8

Fastest lap
Driver	(Australia) Jack Brabham	Brabham-Cosworth
- Time: 1:25.8

Podium
First	(United Kingdom) Jackie Stewart	March-Cosworth
Second	(Austria) Jochen Rindt	Lotus-Cosworth
Third	(New Zealand) Denny Hulme	McLaren-Cosworth

The 5th Race of Champions was a non-Championship Formula One motor race held on 22 March 1970 at Brands Hatch circuit in Kent, England. The race was run over 50 laps of the circuit, and was won by Jackie Stewart in a March 701; Stewart having qualified in pole position. Jochen Rindt was second in a Lotus 49C and Denny Hulme third in a McLaren M14A. Jack Brabham set fastest lap in his Brabham BT33, finishing fourth.

== Classification ==
Pos.	No.	Driver	Entrant	Constructor	Laps	Time/Retired	Grid
1	1	(United Kingdom) Jackie Stewart	Tyrrell Racing Organisation	March-Cosworth	50	1:12:51.800	1
2	8	(Austria) Jochen Rindt	Team Lotus Ltd	Lotus-Cosworth	50	+36.200	4
3	5	(New Zealand) Denny Hulme	Bruce McLaren Motor Racing Ltd	McLaren-Cosworth	50	+1:22.400	5
4	16	(Australia) Jack Brabham	Motor Racing Developments Ltd	Brabham-Cosworth	49	+1 lap	2
5	9	(United Kingdom) Graham Hill	Rob Walker Racing Team	Lotus-Cosworth	49	+1 lap	8
6	6	(United Kingdom) Peter Gethin	Bruce McLaren Motor Racing Ltd	McLaren-Cosworth	49	+1 lap	9
Ret	12	(Canada) George Eaton	BRM Ltd	BRM	23	Electrical	11
Ret	4	(New Zealand) Bruce McLaren	Bruce McLaren Motor Racing Ltd	McLaren-Cosworth	21	Accident	6
Ret	11	(United Kingdom) Jackie Oliver	BRM Ltd	BRM	12	Rear hub shaft	3
Ret	10	(United States) Pete Lovely	Pete Lovely Volkswagen Inc.	Lotus-Cosworth	11	Accident	12
Ret	3	(New Zealand) Chris Amon	March Engineering Ltd	March-Cosworth	10	Camshaft	7
Ret	7	(United Kingdom) John Surtees	Team Surtees Ltd	McLaren-Cosworth	10	Throttle	10
DNS	14	(France) Jean-Pierre Beltoise	Equipe Matra	Matra		Practice accident	
DNS	15	(United Kingdom) Derek Bell	Tom Wheatcroft Racing	Brabham-Cosworth		Practice accident	

Previous race: 1969 International Gold Cup	Formula One non-championship races 1970 season	Next race: 1970 BRDC International Trophy
Previous race: 1969 Race of Champions	Race of Champions	Next race: 1971 Race of Champions
