= 1969 Monaco Grand Prix =

Coordinates: 43°44′5″N 7°25′17″E

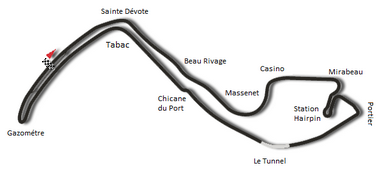

Race details
- Date: 18 May 1969
- Official name: XXVII Grand Prix Automobile de Monaco
- Location: Circuit de Monaco, Monte Carlo, Monaco
- Course: Street Circuit
- Course length: 3.145 km (1.954 miles)
- Distance: 80 laps, 251.600 km (156.337 miles)
- Weather: Overcast, mild, dry

Pole position
Driver	(United Kingdom) Jackie Stewart	Matra-Ford
- Time: 1:24.6

Fastest lap
Driver	(United Kingdom) Jackie Stewart	Matra-Ford
- Time: 1:25.1 on lap 16

Podium
First	(United Kingdom) Graham Hill	Lotus-Ford
Second	(United Kingdom) Piers Courage	Brabham-Ford
Third	(Switzerland) Jo Siffert	Lotus-Ford

The 1969 Monaco Grand Prix was a Formula One motor race held at the Circuit de Monaco on 18 May 1969. It was race 3 of 11 in both the 1969 World Championship of Drivers and the 1969 International Cup for Formula One Manufacturers.

The 80-lap race was won by Graham Hill, driving a works Lotus-Ford, after he started from fourth position. It was Hill's 14th and final World Championship race victory, and his fifth Monaco win, a record that would stand for 24 years. It was also the first win for a driver wearing a full-face helmet in Formula One. Piers Courage finished second in a Brabham-Ford entered by Frank Williams, with Jo Siffert third in a Lotus-Ford entered by Rob Walker.

This was also the final Formula One race for Cooper as a constructor and Maserati as an engine supplier, Vic Elford finishing seventh and last in a car entered by Colin Crabbe.

== Classification ==
=== Qualifying ===
Pos	No	Driver	Constructor	Time	Gap
1	7	(United Kingdom) Jackie Stewart	Matra-Ford	1:24.6	—
2	11	(New Zealand) Chris Amon	Ferrari	1:25.0	+0.4
3	8	(France) Jean-Pierre Beltoise	Matra-Ford	1:25.4	+0.8
4	1	(United Kingdom) Graham Hill	Lotus-Ford	1:25.8	+1.2
5	9	(Switzerland) Jo Siffert	Lotus-Ford	1:26.0	+1.4
6	14	(United Kingdom) John Surtees	BRM	1:26.0	+1.4
7	6	(Belgium) Jacky Ickx	Brabham-Ford	1:26.3	+1.7
8	5	(Australia) Jack Brabham	Brabham-Ford	1:26.4	+1.8
9	16	(United Kingdom) Piers Courage	Brabham-Ford	1:26.4	+1.8
10	2	(United Kingdom) Richard Attwood	Lotus-Ford	1:26.5	+1.9
11	4	(New Zealand) Bruce McLaren	McLaren-Ford	1:26.7	+2.1
12	3	(New Zealand) Denny Hulme	McLaren-Ford	1:26.8	+2.2
13	15	(United Kingdom) Jackie Oliver	BRM	1:28.4	+3.8
14	10	(Mexico) Pedro Rodríguez	BRM	1:30.5	+5.9
15	17	(Switzerland) Silvio Moser	Brabham-Ford	1:30.5	+5.9
16	12	(United Kingdom) Vic Elford	Cooper-Maserati	1:32.8	+8.2

=== Race ===
Pos	No	Driver	Constructor	Laps	Time/Retired	Grid	Points
1	1	(United Kingdom) Graham Hill	Lotus-Ford	80	1:56:59.4	4	9
2	16	(United Kingdom) Piers Courage	Brabham-Ford	80	+ 17.3	9	6
3	9	(Switzerland) Jo Siffert	Lotus-Ford	80	+ 34.6	5	4
4	2	(United Kingdom) Richard Attwood	Lotus-Ford	80	+ 52.9	10	3
5	4	(New Zealand) Bruce McLaren	McLaren-Ford	79	+ 1 Lap	11	2
6	3	(New Zealand) Denny Hulme	McLaren-Ford	78	+ 2 Laps	12	1
7	12	(United Kingdom) Vic Elford	Cooper-Maserati	74	+ 6 Laps	16	
Ret	6	(Belgium) Jacky Ickx	Brabham-Ford	48	Suspension	7	
Ret	7	(United Kingdom) Jackie Stewart	Matra-Ford	22	Halfshaft	1	
Ret	8	(France) Jean-Pierre Beltoise	Matra-Ford	20	Halfshaft	3	
Ret	11	(New Zealand) Chris Amon	Ferrari	16	Differential	2	
Ret	10	(Mexico) Pedro Rodríguez	BRM	15	Engine	14	
Ret	17	(Switzerland) Silvio Moser	Brabham-Ford	15	Halfshaft	15	
Ret	14	(United Kingdom) John Surtees	BRM	9	Gearbox	6	
Ret	5	(Australia) Jack Brabham	Brabham-Ford	9	Accident	8	
Ret	15	(United Kingdom) Jackie Oliver	BRM	0	Accident	13	

== Notes ==
- This race saw the first pole position set by Matra, and by a French constructor.
- This was the 36th and last podium finish for Graham Hill, setting a new record. He broke the old record set by Juan Manuel Fangio at the 1957 Italian Grand Prix. This record would then be broken by Jackie Stewart at the 1973 Brazilian Grand Prix.

== Championship standings after the race ==
Drivers' Championship standings

	Pos	Driver	Points
	1	(United Kingdom) Jackie Stewart	18
2	2	(United Kingdom) Graham Hill	15
1	3	(New Zealand) Bruce McLaren	10
1	4	(New Zealand) Denny Hulme	8
1	5	(Switzerland) Jo Siffert	7

Constructors' Championship standings

	Pos	Constructor	Points
	1	(France) Matra-Ford	18
1	2	(United Kingdom) Lotus-Ford	15
1	3	(United Kingdom) McLaren-Ford	12
1	4	(United Kingdom) Brabham-Ford	7
1	5	(United Kingdom) BRM	2

- Note: Only the top five positions are included for both sets of standings.

Previous race: 1969 Spanish Grand Prix	FIA Formula One World Championship; 1969 season	Next race: 1969 Dutch Grand Prix
Previous race: 1968 Monaco Grand Prix	Monaco Grand Prix	Next race: 1970 Monaco Grand Prix
