= 1968 International Gold Cup =

- Non-championship race in the 1968 Formula One season

Race details
- Date: 17 August 1968
- Official name: XV Gold Cup
- Location: Oulton Park, Cheshire
- Course: Permanent racing facility
- Course length: 4.4434 km (2.761 miles)
- Distance: 40 laps, 177.736 km (108.4 miles)

Pole position
Driver	(United Kingdom) Graham Hill	Lotus-Cosworth
- Time: 1:29.2

Fastest lap
Drivers	(United Kingdom) Jackie Stewart	Matra-Cosworth
	(New Zealand) Chris Amon	Ferrari
- Time: 1:30.0

Podium
First	(United Kingdom) Jackie Stewart	Matra-Cosworth
Second	(New Zealand) Chris Amon	Ferrari
Third	(United Kingdom) Jackie Oliver	Lotus-Cosworth

The 15th Gold Cup was a motor race, run to Formula One rules, held on 17 August 1968 at Oulton Park, England. The race was run over 40 laps of the circuit, and was won by British driver Jackie Stewart in a Matra MS10.

== Results ==
Pos	No.	Driver	Entrant	Constructor	Time/Retired	Grid
1	5	(United Kingdom) Jackie Stewart	Matra International	Matra-Cosworth	1.00.39.0	2
2	8	(New Zealand) Chris Amon	Scuderia Ferrari	Ferrari	+ 4.6 s	3
3	3	(United Kingdom) Jackie Oliver	Team Lotus	Lotus-Cosworth	+ 49.6 s	7
4	12	(Mexico) Pedro Rodríguez	Reg Parnell (Racing)	BRM	39 laps	6
5	14	(United Kingdom) Tony Lanfranchi	Motor Racing Stables	BRM	34 laps	12
6	15	(United Kingdom) David Hobbs	Bernard White Racing	BRM	34 laps	13
Ret	17	(United Kingdom) Derek Bell	Scuderia Ferrari	Ferrari	25 laps - engine	8
Ret	6	(Australia) Jack Brabham	Brabham Racing Organisation	Brabham-Repco	22 laps - oil leak	4
Ret	9	(Belgium) Jacky Ickx	Scuderia Ferrari	Ferrari	21 laps - ignition	5
Ret	7	(Austria) Jochen Rindt	Brabham Racing Organisation	Brabham-Repco	14 laps - oil leak	9
Ret	10	(Sweden) Jo Bonnier	Ecurie Bonnier	McLaren-BRM	10 laps - oil pressure	11
Ret	11	(United Kingdom) Piers Courage	Reg Parnell (Racing)	BRM	7 laps - front wishbone	10
Ret	2	(United Kingdom) Graham Hill	Team Lotus	Lotus-Cosworth	7 laps - transmission	1

Previous race: 1968 BRDC International Trophy	Formula One non-championship races 1968 season	Next race: 1969 Race of Champions
Previous race: 1967 International Gold Cup	Oulton Park International Gold Cup	Next race: 1969 International Gold Cup
