= 1968 Mexican Grand Prix =

Race details
- Date: November 3, 1968
- Official name: VII Gran Premio de Mexico
- Location: Ciudad Deportiva Magdalena Mixhuca, Mexico City, Mexico
- Course: Permanent racing facility
- Course length: 5.000 km (3.107 miles)
- Distance: 65 laps, 325.000 km (201.946 miles)
- Weather: Sunny, Mild, Dry

Pole position
Driver	(Switzerland) Jo Siffert	Lotus-Ford
- Time: 1:45.22

Fastest lap
Driver	(Switzerland) Jo Siffert	Lotus-Ford
- Time: 1:44.23 on lap 52

Podium
First	(United Kingdom) Graham Hill	Lotus-Ford
Second	(New Zealand) Bruce McLaren	McLaren-Ford
Third	(United Kingdom) Jackie Oliver	Lotus-Ford

The 1968 Mexican Grand Prix was a Formula One motor race held at the Ciudad Deportiva Magdalena Mixhuca on November 3, 1968. It was race 12 of 12 in both the 1968 World Championship of Drivers and the 1968 International Cup for Formula One Manufacturers.

This race was to determine the World Drivers' Championship, contested between Britons Graham Hill in the Lotus 49B-Ford and Jackie Stewart in the Matra MS10-Ford, and defending champion, New Zealander Denny Hulme in the McLaren M7A-Ford. The race was moved back a week so as not to clash with the Mexico City Summer Olympics, which ended on October 26.

Hulme started with a mathematical chance of becoming world champion, but his McLaren broke a rear suspension member early, crashed, and caught fire. Jo Siffert took the lead, but had to pit with a broken throttle cable. Stewart fell back when his engine started to misfire, his car's handling began going off, and had a fuel-feed problem. Hill won this race and his second Drivers' Championship, after Stewart fell back to seventh after an engine problem with his Matra.

The Mexican government's effort to curb civil unrest led to a switch from military police to unarmed policemen and track marshals for crowd control; by race end, spectators were encroaching on the track itself. This was one reason for the ultimate cancellation of future Mexican Grands Prix.

== Championship permutations ==
Coming into this race, Graham Hill led the Drivers' Championship on 39 points ahead of his title rivals Stewart and Hulme, with both trailing their respective frontrunners in the championship by three points each. It was the first time in four years that at least three drivers were still in contention of winning the drivers' title heading into the season finale. If Hill won the title, he would have won his second championship title after clinching his first one six years prior, whilst Stewart had the chance to claim his maiden drivers' title. If Hulme won, he would have become the first driver since Jack Brabham in 1960 to successfully defend his championship title.

The championship would have been won by either of the top three drivers in the following manner:

	Hill would have won if:		
	(United Kingdom) Graham Hill	(United Kingdom) Jackie Stewart	(New Zealand) Denny Hulme
Pos.	3rd or better	2nd or lower	Any position
Pos.	4th	3rd or lower	2nd or lower
Pos.	5th	3rd or lower	2nd or lower
Pos.	6th	4th or lower	2nd or lower
Pos.	lower than 6th	5th or lower	2nd or lower

	Stewart would have won if:		
	(United Kingdom) Jackie Stewart	(United Kingdom) Graham Hill	(New Zealand) Denny Hulme
Pos.	1st	Any position	Any position
Pos.	2nd	4th or lower	3rd or lower
Pos.	3rd	6th or lower	2nd or lower
Pos.	4th	7th or lower	3rd or lower

	Hulme would have won if:		
	(New Zealand) Denny Hulme	(United Kingdom) Graham Hill	(United Kingdom) Jackie Stewart
Pos.	1st	4th or lower	Any position

== Classification ==
=== Qualifying ===
Pos	No	Driver	Constructor	Time	Gap
1	16	(Switzerland) Jo Siffert	Lotus-Ford	1:45.22	—
2	6	(New Zealand) Chris Amon	Ferrari	1:45.62	+0.40
3	10	(United Kingdom) Graham Hill	Lotus-Ford	1:46.01	+0.97
4	1	(New Zealand) Denny Hulme	McLaren-Ford	1:46.04	+0.82
5	14	(United States) Dan Gurney	McLaren-Ford	1:46.29	+1.07
6	5	(United Kingdom) John Surtees	Honda	1:46.49	+1.27
7	15	(United Kingdom) Jackie Stewart	Matra-Ford	1:46.69	+1.47
8	3	(Australia) Jack Brabham	Brabham-Repco	1:46.80	+1.58
9	2	(New Zealand) Bruce McLaren	McLaren-Ford	1:47.00	+1.78
10	4	(Austria) Jochen Rindt	Brabham-Repco	1:47.07	+1.85
11	12	(Mexico) Moisés Solana	Lotus-Ford	1:47.67	+2.45
12	8	(Mexico) Pedro Rodríguez	BRM	1:47.80	+2.58
13	21	(France) Jean-Pierre Beltoise	Matra	1:48.38	+3.16
14	11	(United Kingdom) Jackie Oliver	Lotus-Ford	1:48.44	+3.22
15	7	(Belgium) Jacky Ickx	Ferrari	1:49.24	+4.02
16	23	(France) Johnny Servoz-Gavin	Matra-Ford	1:49.27	+4.05
17	18	(United Kingdom) Vic Elford	Cooper-BRM	1:49.48	+4.26
18	17	(Sweden) Jo Bonnier	Honda	1:49.96	+4.74
19	22	(United Kingdom) Piers Courage	BRM	1:50.28	+5.06
20	9	(France) Henri Pescarolo	Matra	1:50.43	+5.21
21	19	(Belgium) Lucien Bianchi	Cooper-BRM	1:50.57	+5.35

=== Race ===
Pos	No	Driver	Constructor	Laps	Time/Retired	Grid	Points
1	10	(United Kingdom) Graham Hill	Lotus-Ford	65	1:56:43.95	3	9
2	2	(New Zealand) Bruce McLaren	McLaren-Ford	65	+ 1:19.32	9	6
3	11	(United Kingdom) Jackie Oliver	Lotus-Ford	65	+ 1:40.65	14	4
4	8	(Mexico) Pedro Rodríguez	BRM	65	+ 1:41.09	12	3
5	17	(Sweden) Jo Bonnier	Honda	64	+ 1 Lap	18	2
6	16	(Switzerland) Jo Siffert	Lotus-Ford	64	+ 1 Lap	1	1
7	15	(United Kingdom) Jackie Stewart	Matra-Ford	64	+ 1 Lap	7	
8	18	(United Kingdom) Vic Elford	Cooper-BRM	63	+ 2 Laps	17	
9	9	(France) Henri Pescarolo	Matra	62	+ 3 Laps	20	
10	3	(Australia) Jack Brabham	Brabham-Repco	59	Oil pressure	8	
Ret	23	(France) Johnny Servoz-Gavin	Matra-Ford	57	Ignition	16	
Ret	14	(United States) Dan Gurney	McLaren-Ford	28	Suspension	5	
Ret	22	(United Kingdom) Piers Courage	BRM	25	Engine	19	
Ret	19	(Belgium) Lucien Bianchi	Cooper-BRM	21	Engine	21	
Ret	5	(United Kingdom) John Surtees	Honda	17	Overheating	6	
Ret	6	(New Zealand) Chris Amon	Ferrari	16	Transmission	2	
Ret	12	(Mexico) Moisés Solana	Lotus-Ford	14	Broken wing	11	
Ret	1	(New Zealand) Denny Hulme	McLaren-Ford	10	Suspension	4	
Ret	21	(France) Jean-Pierre Beltoise	Matra	10	Suspension	13	
Ret	7	(Belgium) Jacky Ickx	Ferrari	3	Ignition	15	
Ret	4	(Austria) Jochen Rindt	Brabham-Repco	2	Ignition	10	
DNS	17	(Sweden) Jo Bonnier	McLaren-BRM	0	Engine		

== Notes ==
- This was the first pole position for Jo Siffert and for a Swiss driver.
- This was the eleventh Grand Prix win of the season for a Ford-powered car. It set the record of the most Grand Prix wins in a season (11) and the highest percentage of Grand Prix wins in a season (92%)

== Final Championship standings ==
- **Bold text** indicates the World Champions.

Drivers' Championship standings

Pos	Driver	Points
1	(United Kingdom) **Graham Hill**	48
2	(United Kingdom) Jackie Stewart	36
3	(New Zealand) Denny Hulme	33
4	(Belgium) Jacky Ickx	27
5	(New Zealand) Bruce McLaren	22

Constructors' Championship standings

	Pos	Constructor	Points
	1	(United Kingdom) **Lotus-Ford**	62
1	2	(United Kingdom) McLaren-Ford	49
1	3	(France) Matra-Ford	45
	4	(Italy) Ferrari	32
	5	(United Kingdom) BRM	28

- Note: Only the top five positions are included for both sets of standings.

Previous race: 1968 United States Grand Prix	FIA Formula One World Championship; 1968 season	Next race: 1969 South African Grand Prix
Previous race: 1967 Mexican Grand Prix	Mexican Grand Prix	Next race: 1969 Mexican Grand Prix
