= Surtees TS7 =

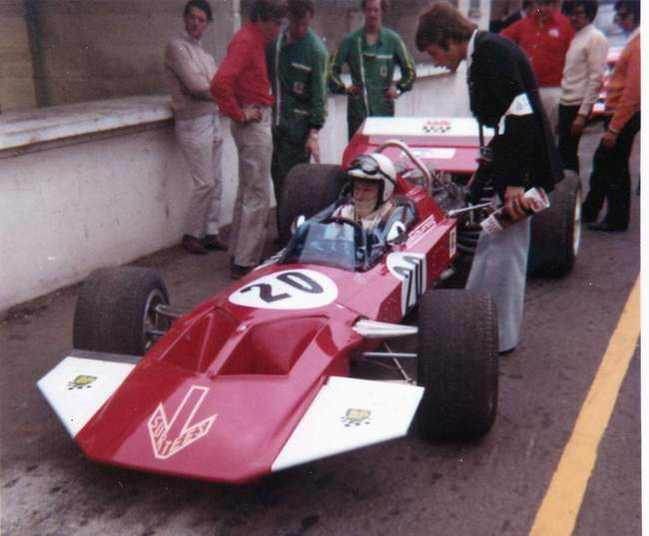
- Category: Formula One
- Constructor: Surtees
- Designers: John Surtees; Shahab Ahmed; Peter Connew
- Successor: Surtees TS9

Technical specifications
- Chassis: Aluminium alloy monocoque
- Engine: Ford-Cosworth DFV 2993cc V8 naturally aspirated Mid-engine, longitudinally mounted
- Transmission: Hewland DG300 5-speed manual
- Fuel: BP
- Tyres: Firestone

Competition history
- Notable entrants: Team Surtees
- Notable drivers: (United Kingdom) John Surtees (United Kingdom) Derek Bell (United Kingdom) Brian Redman (Germany) Rolf Stommelen
- Debut: 1970 British Grand Prix
| Races | Wins | Poles | F/Laps |
|---|---|---|---|
| 9 | 0 | 0 | 0 |
- Unless otherwise stated, all data refer to Formula One World Championship Grands Prix only.

The Surtees TS7 was a Formula One car used by Surtees during the 1970 and 1971 Formula One seasons. It was designed by John Surtees, Shahab Ahmed and Peter Connew.

== Racing history ==
=== 1970-1971: Surtees ===
Surtees was formed by John Surtees after he left BRM to start his own team. He bought a McLaren M7C so that he could use it until the TS7 was ready. The car made its debut at the 1970 British Grand Prix with Surtees driving. He qualified 19th and retired with an oil pressure failure. In Germany, Surtees qualified 15th and was classified in ninth, although his race ended in an engine failure. The Austrian Grand Prix saw Surtees qualify 12th and retire when his engine blew. In Italy, the Englishman qualified 10th and retired when an electrical failure stalled the car at the start. The Canadian Grand Prix saw Surtees qualify and finish fifth. The team owner was joined by Derek Bell as a driver for the United States Grand Prix. Surtees qualified eighth and Bell 13th. The 1964 World Champion retired when his engine blew and Bell finished sixth. In Mexico, the team only entered Surtees. He qualified 15th and finished eighth.

The Surtees team had scored three World Championship points, earning them eighth place in the Constructors' Championship standings.

The 1971 South African Grand Prix saw Team Surtees enter Surtees in the Surtees TS9, and Brian Redman and Rolf Stommelen in TS7s. Stommelen qualified 15th and Redman qualified 17th. Stommelen finished 12th and Redman seventh. Following this race the team elected to concentrate on the TS9.

The Surtees team scored eight World Championship points, earning them eighth place in the Constructors' Championship for the second consecutive season.

=== 1971: Stichting Autoraces Nederland ===
Stichting Autoraces Nederland bought a TS7 from Surtees and entered the 1971 Dutch Grand Prix with local driver Gijs van Lennep. He qualified 21st and finished eighth.

== Complete Formula One World Championship results ==
(key) (results in italics indicate fastest lap)

| Year | Entrant | Engines | Tyres | Drivers | 1 | 2 | 3 | 4 | 5 | 6 | 7 | 8 | 9 | 10 | 11 | 12 | 13 | Points | WCC |
|---|---|---|---|---|---|---|---|---|---|---|---|---|---|---|---|---|---|---|---|
| 1970 | Team Surtees | Ford Cosworth DFV 3.0 V8 | F | | RSA | ESP | MON | BEL | NED | FRA | GBR | GER | AUT | ITA | CAN | USA | MEX | 3 | 8th |
| 1970 | Team Surtees | Ford Cosworth DFV 3.0 V8 | F | John Surtees | | | | | | | Ret | 9 | Ret | Ret | 5 | Ret | 8 | 3 | 8th |
| 1970 | Team Surtees | Ford Cosworth DFV 3.0 V8 | F | Derek Bell | | | | | | | | | | | | 6 | | 3 | 8th |
| 1971 | Auto Motor Und Sport Team Surtees | Ford Cosworth DFV 3.0 V8 | F | | RSA | ESP | MON | NED | FRA | GBR | GER | AUT | ITA | CAN | USA | | | 8* | 8th |
| 1971 | Auto Motor Und Sport Team Surtees | Ford Cosworth DFV 3.0 V8 | F | Rolf Stommelen | 12 | | | | | | | | | | | | | 8* | 8th |
| 1971 | Team Surtees | Ford Cosworth DFV 3.0 V8 | F | Brian Redman | 7 | | | | | | | | | | | | | 8* | 8th |
| 1971 | Stichting Autoraces Nederland | Ford Cosworth DFV 3.0 V8 | F | Gijs van Lennep | | | | 8 | | | | | | | | | | 8* | 8th |

* All points scored using the Surtees TS9.

== Non-Championship Formula One results ==
(key) (Races in bold indicate pole position) (Races in italics indicate fastest lap)

| Year | Entrant | Engines | Tyres | Drivers | 1 | 2 | 3 | 4 | 5 | 6 | 7 | 8 |
|---|---|---|---|---|---|---|---|---|---|---|---|---|
| 1970 | Team Surtees | Ford Cosworth DFV 3.0 V8 | **F** | | ROC | INT | OUL | | | | | |
| 1970 | Team Surtees | Ford Cosworth DFV 3.0 V8 | **F** | John Surtees | | | **1** | | | | | |
| 1971 | Auto Motor Und Sport Team Surtees | Ford Cosworth DFV 3.0 V8 | **F** | | ARG | ROC | QUE | SPR | INT | RIN | OUL | VIC |
| 1971 | Auto Motor Und Sport Team Surtees | Ford Cosworth DFV 3.0 V8 | **F** | Rolf Stommelen | **12** | | | | | | | |
