= Surtees TS9 =

Surtees TS9 Surtees TS9B
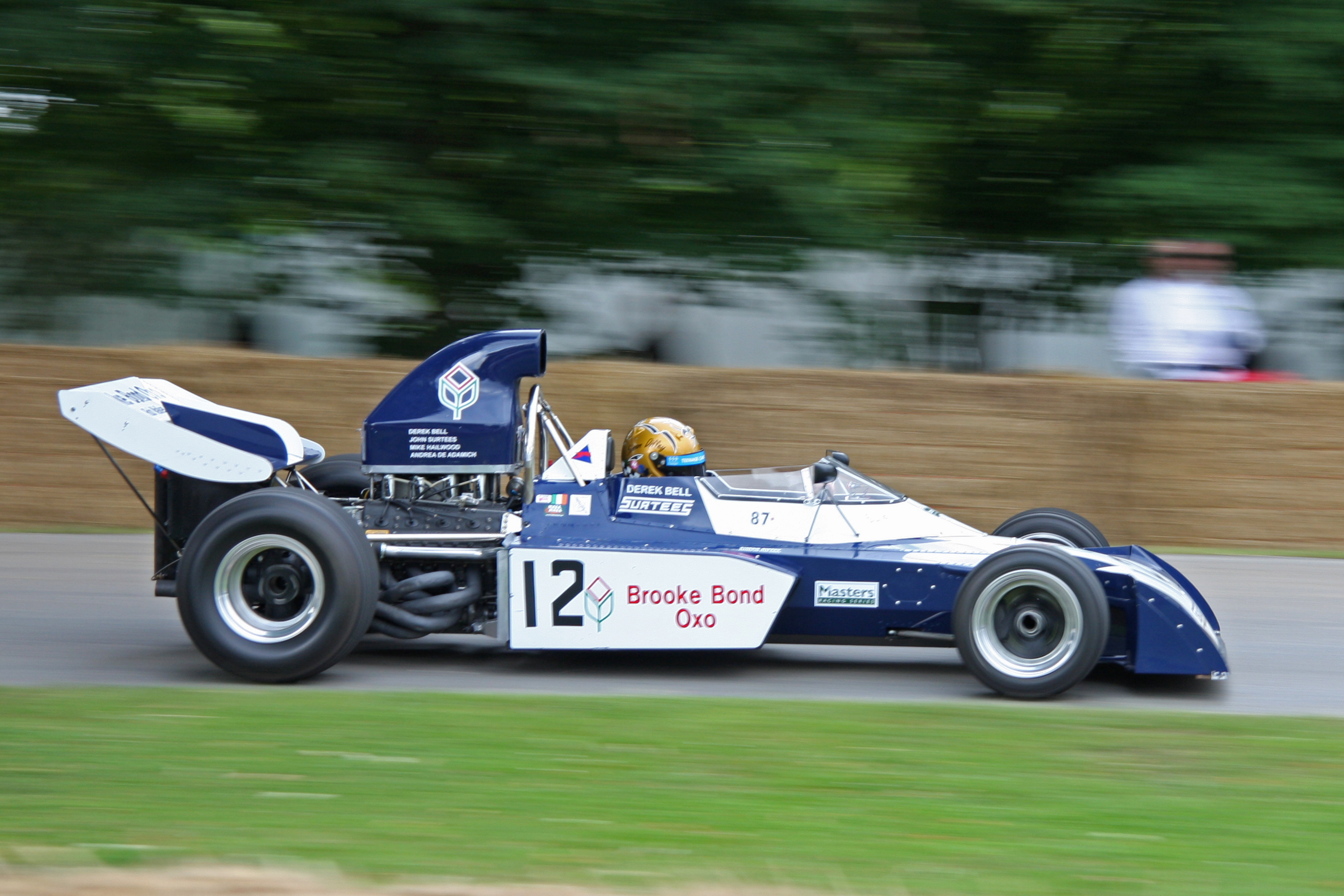
- Category: Formula One
- Constructor: Surtees
- Designers: John Surtees; Peter Connew
- Predecessor: Surtees TS7
- Successor: Surtees TS14

Technical specifications
- Chassis: Aluminium alloy monocoque
- Engine: Ford-Cosworth DFV 2993cc V8 naturally aspirated Mid-engine, longitudinally mounted
- Transmission: Hewland FG400 5-speed manual
- Fuel: BP; Duckhams; FINA; Shell
- Tyres: Firestone; Goodyear

Competition history
- Notable entrants: Team Surtees
- Notable drivers: (United Kingdom) John Surtees (United Kingdom) Derek Bell (United Kingdom) Mike Hailwood (Germany) Rolf Stommelen
- Debut: 1971 South African Grand Prix
Races	Wins	Poles	F/Laps
25	0	0	0
- Unless otherwise stated, all data refer to Formula One World Championship Grands Prix only.

The Surtees TS9 was a Formula One car used by Surtees during the 1971, 1972 and 1973 Formula One seasons. It was designed by John Surtees and Peter Connew.

== Racing history ==
=== 1971–1973: Surtees ===
The TS9 made its debut at the 1971 South African Grand Prix, Only one chassis was available for English driver/owner John Surtees but he retired with a gearbox problem. A second car was available for German Rolf Stommelen for Spain but the German retired with fuel pressure failure and Surtees finished 11th, At the Monaco Grand Prix Stommelen finished sixth and Surtees seventh. For Holland the Englishman finished fifth and the German was disqualified for being push-started by marshals after he spun. At the French Grand Prix Surtees finished eighth and Stommelen 11th. Derek Bell joined Stommelen and Surtees For Britain. Bell retired and Stommelen finished fifth with Surtees sixth, At the German Grand Prix, the Englishman finished seventh and the German tenth. In Austria, the Englishman retired with engine failure and the German finished seventh. English driver Mike Hailwood joined Stommelen and Surtees for the Italian Grand Prix and finished fourth. Stommelen retired with an accident after the start and Surtees also retired with engine failure. In Canada, the Englishman finished 11th and the German retired with overheating. Two changes followed, Stommelen was replaced by American Sam Posey and Hailwood returned to join Surtees before the United States Grand Prix. Hailwood finished 15th, Surtees 17th and Posey retired with piston failure.

The Surtees team updated the TS9 into the TS9B but used a different driver lineup. John Surtees retired from driving to take on the management side of the team and hired Australian Tim Schenken and Italian Andrea de Adamich. The season began with the 1972 Argentine Grand Prix, Schenken finished fifth and de Adamich retired with fuel system failure. Englishman Mike Hailwood joined Schenken and de Adamich for South Africa. The Italian was ten laps down and was not classified. The Englishman retired with broken suspension and the Australian also retired with engine failure. The Spanish Grand Prix saw de Adamich fourth, Schenken eighth and Hailwood retire with an electrical fault. At Monaco, the Italian finished seventh but the Englishman and the Australian both retired with accidents in the wet weather. The Belgian Grand Prix saw Hailwood fourth, Schenken retire with overheating and de Adamich also retire with engine failure. At France, the Englishman finished sixth, the Italian 14th and the Australian 17th. All three drivers retired at the British Grand Prix, Schenken with broken suspension, Hailwood with a broken gearbox and de Adamich with an accident. At Germany, the Italian finished 13th, the Australian 14th and the Englishman retired with broken suspension. The Austrian Grand Prix saw Hailwood fourth, Schenken 11th and de Adamich 14th, At Italy, the Englishman finished second, the Italian retired with brake failure and the Australian also retired when he spun off. Surtees only entered Schenken and de Adamich for the Canadian Grand Prix. Schenken finished seventh and de Adamich retired with a broken gearbox. For the United States, Schenken drove the Surtees TS14 and Hailwood returned but finished 17th after an accident and de Adamich retired also through accident.

The TS9B was only entered twice in 1973 as the team concentrated on the Surtees TS14A The TS9B was entered at the 1973 Brazilian Grand Prix with Brazilian driver Luiz Bueno and finished 12th. De Adamich returned for South Africa and finished eighth, in the last race for the TS9B.

=== 1972:Team Gunston ===
Team Gunston bought a TS9 from Surtees and hired Rhodesian John Love for the 1972 South African Grand Prix. He finished 16th despite having an accident caused by a puncture.

=== 1972:Champcar Inc. ===
Champcar Inc. brought a TS9B from Surtees and hired American Sam Posey for the 1972 United States Grand Prix who finished 12th.

== Complete Formula One World Championship results ==
(key) (results in italics indicate fastest lap)

Year	Entrant	Engines	Tyres	Drivers	1	2	3	4	5	6	7	8	9	10	11	12	13	14	15	Points	WCC
1971	Brooke Bond Oxo Team Surtees	Ford Cosworth DFV; 3.0 V8	F		RSA	ESP	MON	NED	FRA	GBR	GER	AUT	ITA	CAN	USA					8	8th
1971	Brooke Bond Oxo Team Surtees	Ford Cosworth DFV; 3.0 V8	F	John Surtees	Ret	11	7	5	8	6	7	Ret	Ret	11	17					8	8th
1971	Auto Motor Und Sport Team Surtees	Ford Cosworth DFV; 3.0 V8	F	Rolf Stommelen		Ret	6	DSQ	11	5	10	7	DNS	Ret						8	8th
1971	Team Surtees	Ford Cosworth DFV; 3.0 V8	F	Derek Bell						Ret										8	8th
1971	Team Surtees	Ford Cosworth DFV; 3.0 V8	F	Mike Hailwood									4		15					8	8th
1971	Team Surtees	Ford Cosworth DFV; 3.0 V8	F	Gijs van Lennep											DNS					8	8th
1971	Team Surtees	Ford Cosworth DFV; 3.0 V8	F	Sam Posey											Ret					8	8th
1972	Brooke Bond Oxo Team Surtees	Ford Cosworth DFV; 3.0 V8	F		ARG	RSA	ESP	MON	BEL	FRA	GBR	GER	AUT	ITA	CAN	USA				18	5th
1972	Brooke Bond Oxo Team Surtees	Ford Cosworth DFV; 3.0 V8	F	Mike Hailwood		Ret	Ret	Ret	4	6	Ret	Ret	4	2		17				18	5th
1972	Brooke Bond Oxo Team Surtees	Ford Cosworth DFV; 3.0 V8	F	Tim Schenken	5	Ret	8													18	5th
1972	Team Surtees	Ford Cosworth DFV; 3.0 V8	F	Tim Schenken				Ret	Ret			14	11	Ret	7					18	5th
1972	Flame Out Team Surtees	Ford Cosworth DFV; 3.0 V8	F	Tim Schenken						17	Ret									18	5th
1972	Ceramica Pagnossin Team Surtees	Ford Cosworth DFV; 3.0 V8	F	Andrea de Adamich	Ret	NC	4	7	Ret	14	Ret	13	14	Ret	Ret	Ret				18	5th
1972	Champcar Inc.	Ford Cosworth DFV; 3.0 V8	G	Sam Posey												12				18	5th
1972	Team Gunston	Ford Cosworth DFV; 3.0 V8	G	John Love		16														18	5th
1973	Team Surtees	Ford Cosworth DFV; 3.0 V8	F		ARG	BRA	RSA	ESP	BEL	MON	SWE	FRA	GBR	NED	GER	AUT	ITA	CAN	USA	7	7th
1973	Team Surtees	Ford Cosworth DFV; 3.0 V8	F	Luiz Bueno		12														7	7th
1973	Ceramica Pagnossin Team Surtees	Ford Cosworth DFV; 3.0 V8	F	Andrea de Adamich			8													7	7th

== Non-Championship Formula One results ==
(key) (Races in bold indicate pole position) (Races in italics indicate fastest lap)

Year	Entrant	Engines	Tyres	Drivers	1	2	3	4	5	6	7	8
1971	Brooke Bond Oxo Team Surtees	Ford Cosworth DFV 3.0 V8	F		ARG	ROC	QUE	SPR	INT	RIN	OUL	VIC
1971	Brooke Bond Oxo Team Surtees	Ford Cosworth DFV 3.0 V8	F	(United Kingdom) John Surtees		3		Ret	12	3	1	6
1971	Auto Motor Und Sport Team Surtees	Ford Cosworth DFV 3.0 V8	F	(Germany) Rolf Stommelen						7		
1971	Team Surtees	Ford Cosworth DFV 3.0 V8	F	(United Kingdom) Mike Hailwood								Ret
1972	Brooke Bond Oxo Team Surtees	Ford Cosworth DFV 3.0 V8	F		ROC	BRA	INT	OUL	REP	VIC		
1972	Brooke Bond Oxo Team Surtees	Ford Cosworth DFV 3.0 V8	F	(United Kingdom) Mike Hailwood	2		Ret			9		
1972	Brooke Bond Oxo Team Surtees	Ford Cosworth DFV 3.0 V8	F	(Australia) Tim Schenken	5							
1972	Team Surtees	Ford Cosworth DFV 3.0 V8	F	(Australia) Tim Schenken				3				
1972	Team Surtees	Ford Cosworth DFV 3.0 V8	F	(Italy) Andrea de Adamich		DNA			2	3		
1972	Team Surtees	Ford Cosworth DFV 3.0 V8	F	(Sweden) Reine Wisell		DNA						
1972	Team Surtees	Ford Cosworth DFV 3.0 V8	F	(United Kingdom) John Surtees			3					
1972	Team Surtees	Ford Cosworth DFV 3.0 V8	F	(Brazil) Carlos Pace						2		
1973	Hesketh Racing	Ford Cosworth DFV 3.0 V8	F		ROC	INT						
1973	Hesketh Racing	Ford Cosworth DFV 3.0 V8	F	(United Kingdom) James Hunt	3							
