= 1970 International Gold Cup =

- Non-championship race in the 1970 Formula One season

Race details
- Date: 22 August 1970
- Official name: XVII International Gold Cup
- Location: Oulton Park, Cheshire
- Course: Permanent racing facility
- Course length: 4.4434 km (2.761 miles)
- Distance: 40 laps, 177.749 km ( miles)

Pole position
Driver	(United Kingdom) John Surtees	Surtees-Cosworth
- Time: 1:36.2

Fastest lap
Driver	(United Kingdom) Jackie Stewart	Tyrrell-Cosworth
- Time: 1:26.6

Podium
First	(United Kingdom) John Surtees	Surtees-Cosworth
Second	(Austria) Jochen Rindt	Lotus-Cosworth
Third	(United Kingdom) Jackie Oliver	BRM

The 1970 International Gold Cup was a non-championship Formula One race held at Oulton Park on 22 August 1970. The race was open to Formula One and Formula 5000 cars. It was run in two heats of 20 laps, with the winner decided on aggregate times. The starting grid for Heat 1 was decided by a qualifying session, in which John Surtees won pole position. The grid for Heat 2 was decided by the finishing order of Heat 1. John Surtees won Heat 1 and overall, narrowly beating Heat 2 winner Jochen Rindt, with Howden Ganley posting the best aggregate result of the Formula 5000 entrants. Jackie Stewart, debuting the brand-new Tyrrell 001, set fastest lap.

== Qualifying ==
Blue background denotes F5000 entrants.

Pos.	No.	Driver	Constructor	Car	Time	Gap
1	4	(United Kingdom) John Surtees	Surtees-Cosworth	Surtees TS7	1:36.2	
2	5	(United Kingdom) Jackie Oliver	BRM	BRM P153	1:39.2	+3.0
3	30	(Australia) Frank Gardner	Lola-Chevrolet	Lola T190	1:42.0	+2.8
4	21	(United Kingdom) David Prophet	McLaren-Chevrolet	McLaren M10B	1:42.0	+0.0
5	1	(United Kingdom) Jackie Stewart	Tyrrell-Cosworth	Tyrrell 001	1:43.8^{1}	+1.8
6	77	(United Kingdom) Trevor Taylor	Lola-Chevrolet	Lola T190	1:44.0	+0.2
7	42	(New Zealand) Graham McRae	McLaren-Chevrolet	McLaren M10B	1:45.2	+1.2
8	41	(Sweden) Reine Wisell	McLaren-Chevrolet	McLaren M10B	1:45.4	+0.2
9	12	(New Zealand) Howden Ganley	McLaren-Chevrolet	McLaren M10B	1:46.8	+1.4
10	2	(Austria) Jochen Rindt	Lotus-Cosworth	Lotus 72	1:46.8	+0.0
11	43	(United Kingdom) Mike Hailwood	Lola-Chevrolet	Lola T190	1:50.0	+3.2
12	3	(United Kingdom) Graham Hill	Lotus-Cosworth	Lotus 72	1:52.8	+2.8
13	47	(United Kingdom) Tony Lanfranchi	Lola-Chevrolet	Lola T190	1:53.4	+0.6
14	66	(United Kingdom) Fred Saunders	Crosslé-Rover	Crosslé 15F	1:54.2	+0.8
15	23	(United Kingdom) John Myerscough	Brabham-Oldsmobile	Brabham BT11	1:56.6	+2.4
16	88	(United Kingdom) Chris Summers	Lola-Chevrolet	Lola T142	1:58.6	+2.0
17	70	(United Kingdom) Alan Rollinson	Surtees-Chevrolet	Surtees TS5A	1:59.0	+0.4
18	31	(Republic of Ireland) Lingard Goulding	Beattie-Chevrolet	Beattie P1100	1:59.8	+0.8
19	98	(United Kingdom) Bob Miller	Dulon-Ford	Dulon LD8	2:02.8	+3.0
20	10	(United Kingdom) Kaye Griffiths	Lola-Chevrolet	Lola T142	2:04.4	+1.6
21	63	(United Kingdom) Ray Calcutt	Lola-Chevrolet	Lola T142	2:06.4	+2.0
22	16	(United Kingdom) Ippocastano	Cooper-Chevrolet	Cooper T86B	2:23.8	+17.4
DNA	6	(Italy) Andrea de Adamich	McLaren-Alfa Romeo	McLaren M14D		
DNA	7	(Australia) Tim Schenken	De Tomaso-Cosworth	De Tomaso 505-38		
DNA	9	(United Kingdom) Willie Forbes	Lola-Chevrolet	Lola T142		
DNA	11	(United States) Roy Pike	Leda-Chevrolet	Leda LT20		
DNA	44	(United Kingdom) Mike Walker	McLaren-Chevrolet	McLaren M10B		
DNA	45	(United Kingdom) Jock Russell	Lotus-Chevrolet	Lotus 70		
DNA	48	(United Kingdom) Robin Darlington	McLaren-Chevrolet	McLaren M10A		
DNA	49	(United Kingdom) David Berry	Brabham-Oldsmobile	Brabham BT16		
DNA	78	(United Kingdom) David Powell	Lola-Chevrolet	Lola T142		

^{1}Stewart started from the back of the grid

== Classification ==
Blue background denotes F5000 entrants.

=== Heat 1 ===
Pos.	No.	Driver	Constructor	Time	Grid
1	4	(United Kingdom) John Surtees	Surtees-Cosworth	29:58.2	1
2	5	(United Kingdom) Jackie Oliver	BRM	+6.6	2
3	2	(Austria) Jochen Rindt	Lotus-Cosworth	+12.8	10
4	43	(United Kingdom) Mike Hailwood	Lola-Chevrolet	+33.8	11
5	12	(New Zealand) Howden Ganley	McLaren-Chevrolet	+1:24.8	9
6	77	(United Kingdom) Trevor Taylor	Lola-Chevrolet	19 laps	6
7	1	(United Kingdom) Jackie Stewart	Tyrrell-Cosworth	19 laps	5
8	21	(United Kingdom) David Prophet	McLaren-Chevrolet	19 laps	4
9	66	(United Kingdom) Fred Saunders	Crosslé-Rover	18 laps	14
10	10	(United Kingdom) Kaye Griffiths	Lola-Chevrolet	18 laps	20
NC	98	(United Kingdom) Bob Miller	Dulon-Ford	17 laps	19
NC	88	(United Kingdom) Chris Summers	Lola-Chevrolet	17 laps	16
NC	31	(Republic of Ireland) Lingard Goulding	Beattie-Chevrolet	17 laps	18
Ret	41	(Sweden) Reine Wisell	McLaren-Chevrolet	16 laps, gearbox	8
Ret	30	(Australia) Frank Gardner	Lola-Chevrolet	13 laps, suspension	3
Ret	3	(United Kingdom) Graham Hill	Lotus-Cosworth	3 laps, oil pressure	12
Ret	70	(United Kingdom) Alan Rollinson	Surtees-Chevrolet	3 laps, head gasket	17
Ret	23	(United Kingdom) John Myerscough	Brabham-Oldsmobile	0 laps, engine	15
DNS	42	(New Zealand) Graham McRae	McLaren-Chevrolet	practice accident	7
DNS	47	(United Kingdom) Tony Lanfranchi	Lola-Chevrolet	practice accident	13
DNS	63	(United Kingdom) Ray Calcutt	Lola-Chevrolet	radiator	21
DNS	16	(United Kingdom) Ippocastano	Cooper-Chevrolet	not competitive	22

=== Heat 2 ===
Pos.	No.	Driver	Constructor	Time	Grid
1	2	(Austria) Jochen Rindt	Lotus-Cosworth	29:40.6	3
2	4	(United Kingdom) John Surtees	Surtees-Cosworth	+9.4	1
3	5	(United Kingdom) Jackie Oliver	BRM	+23.0	2
4	30	(Australia) Frank Gardner	Lola-Chevrolet	+39.2	13
5	12	(New Zealand) Howden Ganley	McLaren-Chevrolet	+1:27.6	4
6	77	(United Kingdom) Trevor Taylor	Lola-Chevrolet	19 laps^{1}	5
7	66	(United Kingdom) Fred Saunders	Crosslé-Rover	18 laps	7
8	10	(United Kingdom) Kaye Griffiths	Lola-Chevrolet	18 laps	8
9	88	(United Kingdom) Chris Summers	Lola-Chevrolet	18 laps	10
NC	63	(United Kingdom) Ray Calcutt	Lola-Chevrolet	17 laps	14
NC	98	(United Kingdom) Bob Miller	Dulon-Ford	17 laps	9
NC	31	(Republic of Ireland) Lingard Goulding	Beattie-Chevrolet	17 laps	11
NC	21	(United Kingdom) David Prophet	McLaren-Chevrolet	17 laps	6
Ret	41	(Sweden) Reine Wisell	McLaren-Chevrolet	2 laps, gearbox	12
DNS	43	(United Kingdom) Mike Hailwood	Lola-Chevrolet	oil filter	
DNS	1	(United Kingdom) Jackie Stewart	Tyrrell-Cosworth	piston	

^{1}Taylor stopped 1 lap early in error

=== Aggregate ===
Pos.	No.	Driver	Constructor	Time
1	4	(United Kingdom) John Surtees	Surtees-Cosworth	59:48.2
2	2	(Austria) Jochen Rindt	Lotus-Cosworth	+3.4
3	5	(United Kingdom) Jackie Oliver	BRM	40 laps
4	12	(New Zealand) Howden Ganley	McLaren-Chevrolet	40 laps
5	77	(United Kingdom) Trevor Taylor	Lola-Chevrolet	38 laps
6	66	(United Kingdom) Fred Saunders	Crosslé-Rover	36 laps
7	21	(United Kingdom) David Prophet	McLaren-Chevrolet	36 laps
8	10	(United Kingdom) Kaye Griffiths	Lola-Chevrolet	36 laps
NC	30	(Australia) Frank Gardner	Lola-Chevrolet	35 laps
NC	88	(United Kingdom) Chris Summers	Lola-Chevrolet	35 laps
NC	98	(United Kingdom) Bob Miller	Dulon-Ford	34 laps
NC	31	(Republic of Ireland) Lingard Goulding	Beattie-Chevrolet	34 laps
NC	43	(United Kingdom) Mike Hailwood	Lola-Chevrolet	20 laps
NC	41	(Sweden) Reine Wisell	McLaren-Chevrolet	19 laps
NC	63	(United Kingdom) Ray Calcutt	Lola-Chevrolet	17 laps

Previous race: 1970 BRDC International Trophy	Formula One non-championship races 1970 season	Next race: 1971 Argentine Grand Prix
Previous race: 1969 International Gold Cup	Oulton Park International Gold Cup	Next race: 1971 International Gold Cup
