= 1972 Italian Grand Prix =

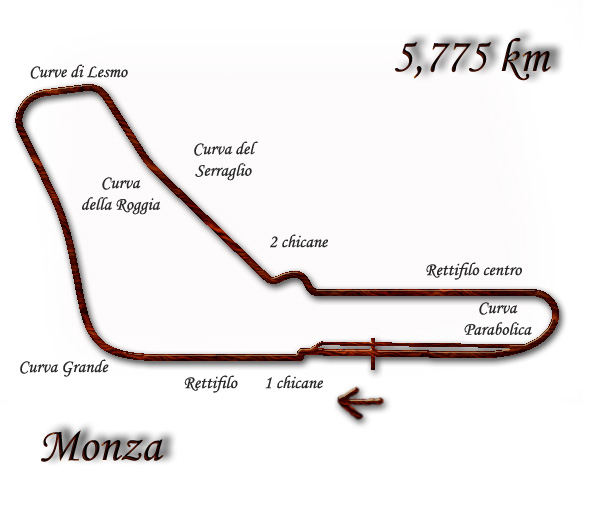

Race details
- Date: 10 September 1972
- Official name: 43º Gran Premio d'Italia
- Location: Autodromo Nazionale di Monza; Monza, Lombardy, Italy
- Course: Permanent racing facility
- Course length: 5.775 km (3.588 miles)
- Distance: 55 laps, 317.625 km (197.363 miles)
- Weather: Dry and sunny

Pole position
Driver	(Belgium) Jacky Ickx	Ferrari
- Time: 1:35.65

Fastest lap
Driver	(Belgium) Jacky Ickx	Ferrari
- Time: 1:36.3

Podium
First	(Brazil) Emerson Fittipaldi	Lotus-Ford
Second	(United Kingdom) Mike Hailwood	Surtees-Ford
Third	(New Zealand) Denny Hulme	McLaren-Ford

The 1972 Italian Grand Prix was a Formula One motor race held at Monza on 10 September 1972. It was race 10 of 12 in both the 1972 World Championship of Drivers and the 1972 International Cup for Formula One Manufacturers.

Before the race, the Monza circuit was modified with the addition of two chicanes, one before the Curva Grande and one at the site of the old Curva Vialone, in order to reduce speeds in the interests of safety. Team Lotus was forced to run only one car because Emerson Fittipaldi's Lotus 72D was seriously damaged in an accident while being transported to Monza. Fittipaldi raced another 72D, but with specifications very close to the 1970 model.

The 55-lap race was won by Brazilian driver Emerson Fittipaldi, driving a Lotus-Ford, after he started from sixth position. With the win, Fittipaldi sealed the Drivers' Championship, becoming both the first Brazilian Formula One World Champion and the youngest ever champion at 25 years and 273 days until superseded by Fernando Alonso at 24 years and 59 days in 2005; Lotus also secured the Manufacturers' Cup. Englishman Mike Hailwood finished second in a Surtees-Ford, with New Zealander Denny Hulme third in a McLaren-Ford.

The race marked the last win for American tyre manufacturer Firestone in Formula One. It was also the last race in which 1964 World Champion John Surtees competed.

== Classification ==
=== Qualifying ===
Pos.	No	Driver	Constructor	Time/Gap
1	4	(Belgium) Jacky Ickx	Ferrari	1:35.65
2	20	(New Zealand) Chris Amon	Matra	+0.04
3	1	(United Kingdom) Jackie Stewart	Tyrrell–Ford	+0.14
4	5	(Switzerland) Clay Regazzoni	Ferrari	+0.18
5	14	(New Zealand) Denny Hulme	McLaren–Ford	+0.32
6	6	(Brazil) Emerson Fittipaldi	Lotus–Ford	+0.64
7	3	(United States) Mario Andretti	Ferrari	+0.67
8	15	(United States) Peter Revson	McLaren–Ford	+0.77
9	10	(United Kingdom) Mike Hailwood	Surtees–Ford	+0.85
10	24	(Sweden) Reine Wisell	BRM	+1.03
11	30	(Argentina) Carlos Reutemann	Brabham–Ford	+1.47
12	23	(United Kingdom) Peter Gethin	BRM	+1.56
13	28	(United Kingdom) Graham Hill	Brabham–Ford	+1.96
14	2	(France) François Cevert	Tyrrell–Ford	+2.14
15	29	(Brazil) Wilson Fittipaldi	Brabham–Ford	+2.17
16	21	(France) Jean-Pierre Beltoise	BRM	+2.21
17	22	(New Zealand) Howden Ganley	BRM	+2.26
18	26	(Brazil) Carlos Pace	March–Ford	+2.33
19	7	(United Kingdom) John Surtees	Surtees–Ford	+2.66
20	18	(Austria) Niki Lauda	March–Ford	+2.87
21	9	(Italy) Andrea de Adamich	Surtees–Ford	+2.95
22	8	(Australia) Tim Schenken	Surtees–Ford	+2.96
23	11	(Italy) Nanni Galli	Tecno	+2.99
24	19	(Sweden) Ronnie Peterson	March–Ford	+3.05
25	16	(United Kingdom) Mike Beuttler	March–Ford	+4.08
26	25	(France) Henri Pescarolo	March–Ford	+4.56
27	12	(United Kingdom) Derek Bell	Tecno	+6.42

*Entries with a red background failed to qualify.

=== Race ===
Pos	No	Driver	Constructor	Laps	Time/Retired	Grid	Points
1	6	(Brazil) Emerson Fittipaldi	Lotus-Ford	55	1:29:58.4	6	9
2	10	(United Kingdom) Mike Hailwood	Surtees-Ford	55	+ 14.5	9	6
3	14	(New Zealand) Denny Hulme	McLaren-Ford	55	+ 23.8	5	4
4	15	(United States) Peter Revson	McLaren-Ford	55	+ 35.7	8	3
5	28	(United Kingdom) Graham Hill	Brabham-Ford	55	+ 1:05.6	13	2
6	23	(United Kingdom) Peter Gethin	BRM	55	+ 1:21.9	12	1
7	3	(United States) Mario Andretti	Ferrari	54	+ 1 Lap	7	
8	21	(France) Jean-Pierre Beltoise	BRM	54	+ 1 Lap	16	
9	19	(Sweden) Ronnie Peterson	March-Ford	54	+ 1 Lap	24	
10	16	(United Kingdom) Mike Beuttler	March-Ford	54	+ 1 Lap	25	
11	22	(New Zealand) Howden Ganley	BRM	52	+ 3 Laps	17	
12	24	(Sweden) Reine Wisell	BRM	51	+ 4 Laps	10	
13	18	(Austria) Niki Lauda	March-Ford	50	+ 5 Laps	20	
Ret	4	(Belgium) Jacky Ickx	Ferrari	46	Electrical	1	
Ret	20	(New Zealand) Chris Amon	Matra	38	Brakes	2	
Ret	9	(Italy) Andrea de Adamich	Surtees-Ford	33	Brakes	21	
Ret	29	(Brazil) Wilson Fittipaldi	Brabham-Ford	20	Suspension	19	
Ret	7	(United Kingdom) John Surtees	Surtees-Ford	20	Fuel System	22	
Ret	8	(Australia) Tim Schenken	Surtees-Ford	20	Spun Off	15	
Ret	5	(Switzerland) Clay Regazzoni	Ferrari	16	Collision	4	
Ret	26	(Brazil) Carlos Pace	March-Ford	15	Collision	18	
Ret	30	(Argentina) Carlos Reutemann	Brabham-Ford	14	Suspension	11	
Ret	2	(France) François Cevert	Tyrrell-Ford	14	Engine	14	
Ret	11	(Italy) Nanni Galli	Tecno	6	Engine	23	
Ret	1	(United Kingdom) Jackie Stewart	Tyrrell-Ford	0	Clutch	3	
DNQ	25	(France) Henri Pescarolo	March-Ford				
DNQ	12	(United Kingdom) Derek Bell	Tecno				

== Notes ==
- This race marked the first podium finish for British constructor Surtees. It was also the 25th podium finish for McLaren.

== Championship standings after the race ==
Drivers' Championship standings

	Pos	Driver	Points
	1	(Brazil) **Emerson Fittipaldi**	61
1	2	(New Zealand) Denny Hulme	31
1	3	(United Kingdom) Jackie Stewart	27
	4	(Belgium) Jacky Ickx	25
	5	(United States) Peter Revson	17

Constructors' Championship standings

	Pos	Constructor	Points
	1	(United Kingdom) **Lotus-Ford**	61
	2	(United Kingdom) McLaren-Ford	39
	3	(United Kingdom) Tyrrell-Ford	33
	4	(Italy) Ferrari	29
2	5	(United Kingdom) Surtees-Ford	18

- Note: Only the top five positions are included for both sets of standings.
- Bold text indicates the 1972 World Champions.

Previous race: 1972 Austrian Grand Prix	FIA Formula One World Championship; 1972 season	Next race: 1972 Canadian Grand Prix
Previous race: 1971 Italian Grand Prix	Italian Grand Prix	Next race: 1973 Italian Grand Prix
