= Surtees Racing Organisation =

British Formula One team

(United Kingdom) Surtees
- Full name: Surtees Racing Organisation
- Base: Edenbridge, Kent, United Kingdom
- Founder(s): John Surtees
- Noted staff: Len Terry
- Noted drivers: (United Kingdom) John Surtees (Australia) Alan Jones (United Kingdom) John Watson (United Kingdom) Derek Bell (Brazil) Carlos Pace (Italy) Andrea de Adamich (United Kingdom) Mike Hailwood (Germany) Jochen Mass

Formula One World Championship career
- First entry: As a team 1970 South African Grand Prix; As a constructor 1970 British Grand Prix
- Races entered: As a team: 123 entries (122 starts); As a constructor: 119 entries (118 starts)
- Engines: Cosworth DFV
- Constructors' Championships: 0
- Drivers' Championships: 0
- Race victories: 0
- Podiums: 2
- Points: As a team: 54 (Note: 53 points in Surtees cars plus 1 point for John Surtees' sixth-placed finish in the 1970 Dutch Grand Prix driving a McLaren.); As a constructor: 53
- Pole positions: 0
- Fastest laps: 3
- Final entry: 1978 Canadian Grand Prix

The Surtees Racing Organisation was a race team that spent nine seasons as a constructor in Formula One, Formula 2, and Formula 5000, from 1970 to 1978.

== History ==
The team was formed by John Surtees, a four-time 500cc motorcycle champion and the 1964 Formula One champion in 1966 to compete in the newly formed Canadian-American Challenge Cup (CanAm) "unlimited" sports car racing series. Entering as an owner/driver, Surtees won the championship in its first year, driving a Lola T70.

Surtees also fielded an entry in another newly formed series in 1969, becoming part of Formula 5000 after taking over a project started by Len Terry and Roger Nathan, and his team constructed its own cars for the first time. His team was successful, winning five races, consecutively at Mondello Park, Koksijde, Zandvoort, Snetterton and Hockenheim, during a twelve race season.

This inspired Surtees to expand to Formula One, and after having had a difficult season with BRM in 1969, he decided to become an owner/driver again. The team ran the full 1970 season, but Surtees was forced to run the first four races in an old McLaren due to a delay in the construction of his in-house F1 car. The new BP-sponsored car earned its first (and only) points that year in the Canadian Grand Prix.

Surtees added a second full-time car in 1971 for German driver Rolf Stommelen, and ran a third car for various drivers in a number of races. Three drivers, Surtees, Stommelen, and motorcycling champion Mike Hailwood earned three points each for the marque that year.

After the 1971 season, Surtees retired from full-time competition, and the team ended up with three new full-time drivers in 1972. Hailwood returned to Surtees for a full year; joining him were Australian Tim Schenken and Italian Andrea de Adamich, the latter of whom brought sponsorship money to the team. Hailwood produced Surtees' first podium finish that year in the Italian Grand Prix, finishing second to Emerson Fittipaldi. All three drivers scored points for the team, and Surtees finished fifth in the Constructors' Championship.

Schenken was replaced in 1973 by Brazilian Carlos Pace, and the team only ran two full-time cars after de Adamich left following the season opener. Pace finished third in Austria and fourth in Germany, but it was the only points finishes the team had all season, as Hailwood was left scoreless. Hailwood departed for McLaren after the year, being replaced by Jochen Mass in 1974. It was a difficult year for Surtees, as Pace left the team in mid-season, and replacement Derek Bell struggled to qualify for races, capped by Austrian driver Helmut Koinigg's fatal crash at the 1974 United States Grand Prix. A fourth place by Pace at his home track were the only points Surtees managed to get, and they failed to finish in the top ten in the Constructors' Championship.

Low on money for 1975, the team pared back to a single car for John Watson (although a second car was entered for Dave Morgan at Silverstone). The season was a tremendous struggle for Surtees, with no points scored, and the team missed three of the final four races. 1976 was much better, however, as Surtees landed a well-known, but otherwise controversial sponsorship deal with Durex condoms, and Australian Alan Jones joined the team. Jones finished fifth in Belgium and at Brands Hatch, and fourth in Japan. A second car, with Chesterfield sponsorship, was entered for American Brett Lunger, while a customer car was raced by Frenchman Henri Pescarolo during the second half of the season. With seven points, Surtees placed tenth in the Constructors' Championship.

Jones's success resulted in him leaving the team for the emerging Shadow team, and money problems forced Surtees to run one car regularly again in 1977, this time for Vittorio Brambilla. Brambilla's season was effective, also finishing in the points three times. Still, his good results did not prevent Surtees from further monetary troubles. In 1978, the team added a second car for pay driver, Briton Rupert Keegan, but the money problems continued. A lack of decent results caused further problems.

Unable to get sufficient money, the team left F1 after the 1978 season, despite having a car built for 1979. After racing the car in the British Aurora championship (formerly F5000) briefly that year, Surtees Racing Organization was closed for good.

=== Later use ===
Surtees cars are still being raced in historic racing, winning races and titles in the Historic Grand Prix of Monaco and the FIA Historic F1 Championship.

=== Models ===
- TS5 1969-1970 F5000/Formula A. Runner up in the 1969 Guards F5000 championship. Won Le Circuit Continental at Circuit Mont-Tremblant (driven by David Hobbs). One car was purchased by James Garner's American International Racing team and raced at Lime Rock (blown engine) and the same race Hobbs won (knocked out in an 8-car pile-up part way through the 1st lap).
- TS7 1970 Formula One. Designed by Surtees, Shahab Ahmed, and Peter Connew. DFV/Hewland "kit car" followed closely on TS5 layout. Surtees won the Oulton Park International Gold Cup non-Championship race in this car.
- TS8 1971-1972 F5000. Runner up in Rothmans Championship in 1971.
- TS9 1971-1972 Formula One. A derivative of the TS7 with a longer wheelbase and wider track. Surtees repeated his Oulton Park win in 1971.
- TS10 1972 Formula Two. Powered by a Cosworth BDA engine Mike Hailwood convincingly won the 1972 European F2 Championship in this car. Two independent teams purchased TS10s but were not contenders in the series.
- TS11 1972-1973 F5000. Based on the TS9 with a Chevrolet engine. Gijs van Lennep won the 1972 Rothmans European Formula 5000 Championship driving the TS11 and a McLaren M18. A TS11 chassis with TS8 bodywork was prepared to run the 1972 Tasman Series after the TS8 intended for the series was wrecked beyond repair. Hailwood finished second in the series in this car.
- TS14 1972-1973 Formula One. This car marked the beginning of the end for Surtees. Firestone was anticipating leaving Formula One and had little interest in working with Surtees to cure the TS14's habit of devouring tires. It was the first car in F1 to fully comply with crumple-zone legislation, incorporating these into its side pods within which the radiators were mounted, laying down the floorplan for the vast majority of subsequent F1 designs. It was a very quick car at its introduction but a series of accidents and lack of development support did not help it reach its potential. Surtees drove his last F1 race in the TS14 at Monza in 1972.
- TS15 1973 Formula Two. With BMW supplying engines exclusively to March Surtees was forced to settle for second place in the F2 Championships. A good car, but no match for the BMW engine. A development of this car, the TS17, was intended to run a Ford Motor Company V8 in F5000, but nothing came of the plan.
- TS16 1974-1975 Formula One. Based on the TS14, but overweight and with less than top notch DFV engines. The team also failed to engage a single major sponsor for 1974 so money was tight to say the least. Only a single car was run and to cap off a truly terrible year driver Helmut Koinigg was killed during the 1974 United States Grand Prix at Watkins Glen. The car was run again in 1975 and John Watson scored in three non-Championship events, but no championship points were scored.
- TS19 1976-1978 Formula One. A fresh car designed by Surtees and Ken Sears the TS19 managed to score points for Surtees in 1976 and 1977, and even ran the opening races of the 1978 season.
- TS20 1978 Formula One. A development of the TS19, the TS20 was a clean design that promised well, only to be completely overshadowed by the introduction of ground effects.

=== Gallery ===
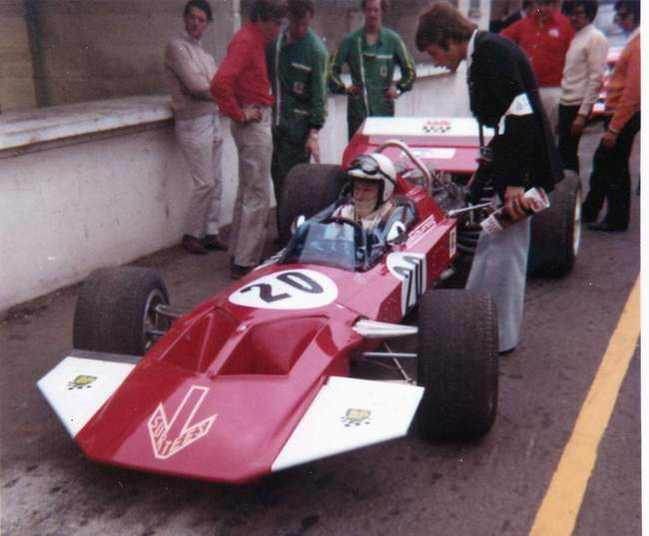
John Surtees at the wheel of the TS7 at its Brands Hatch debut.

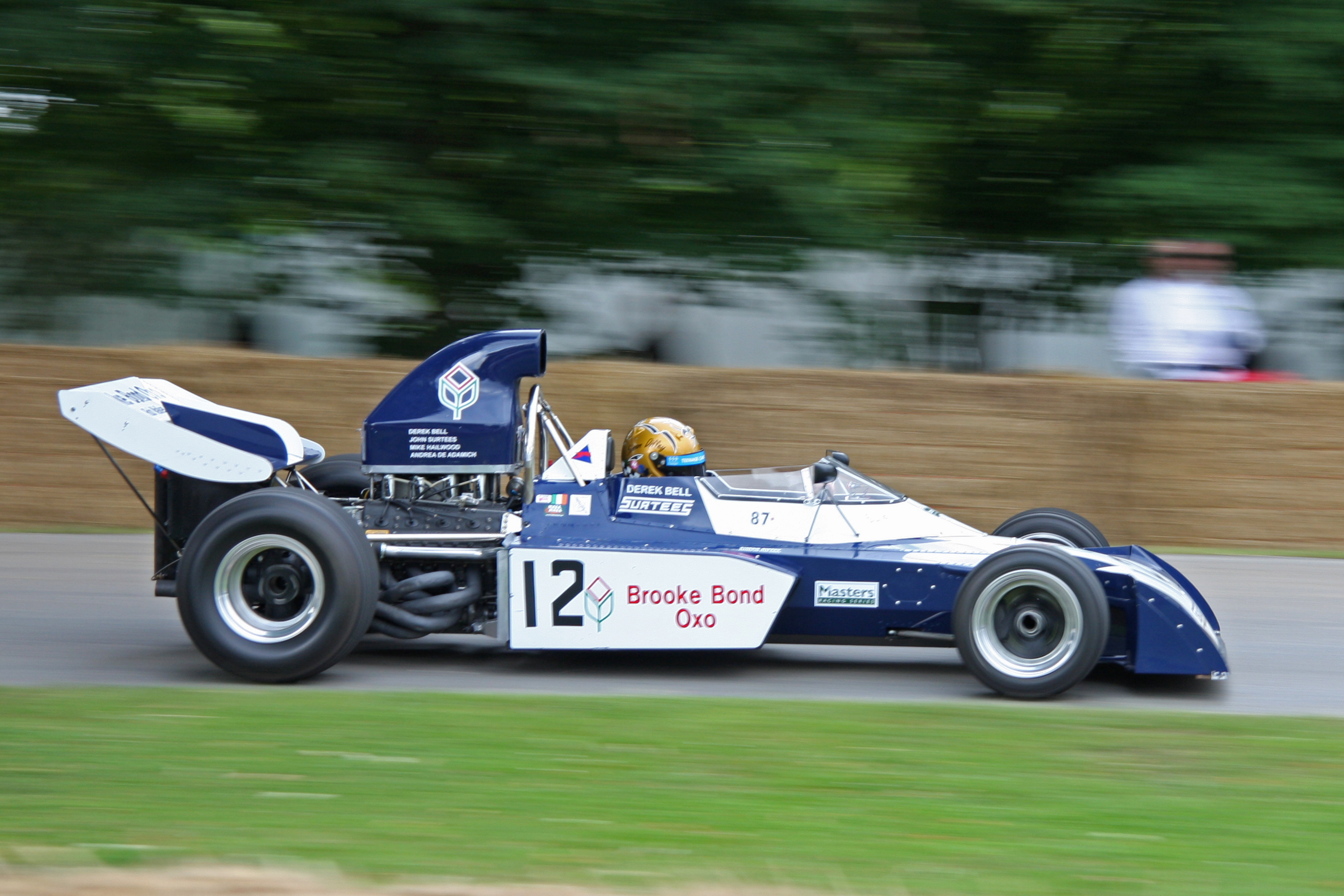
The TS9B being demonstrated at the 2008 Goodwood Festival of Speed.

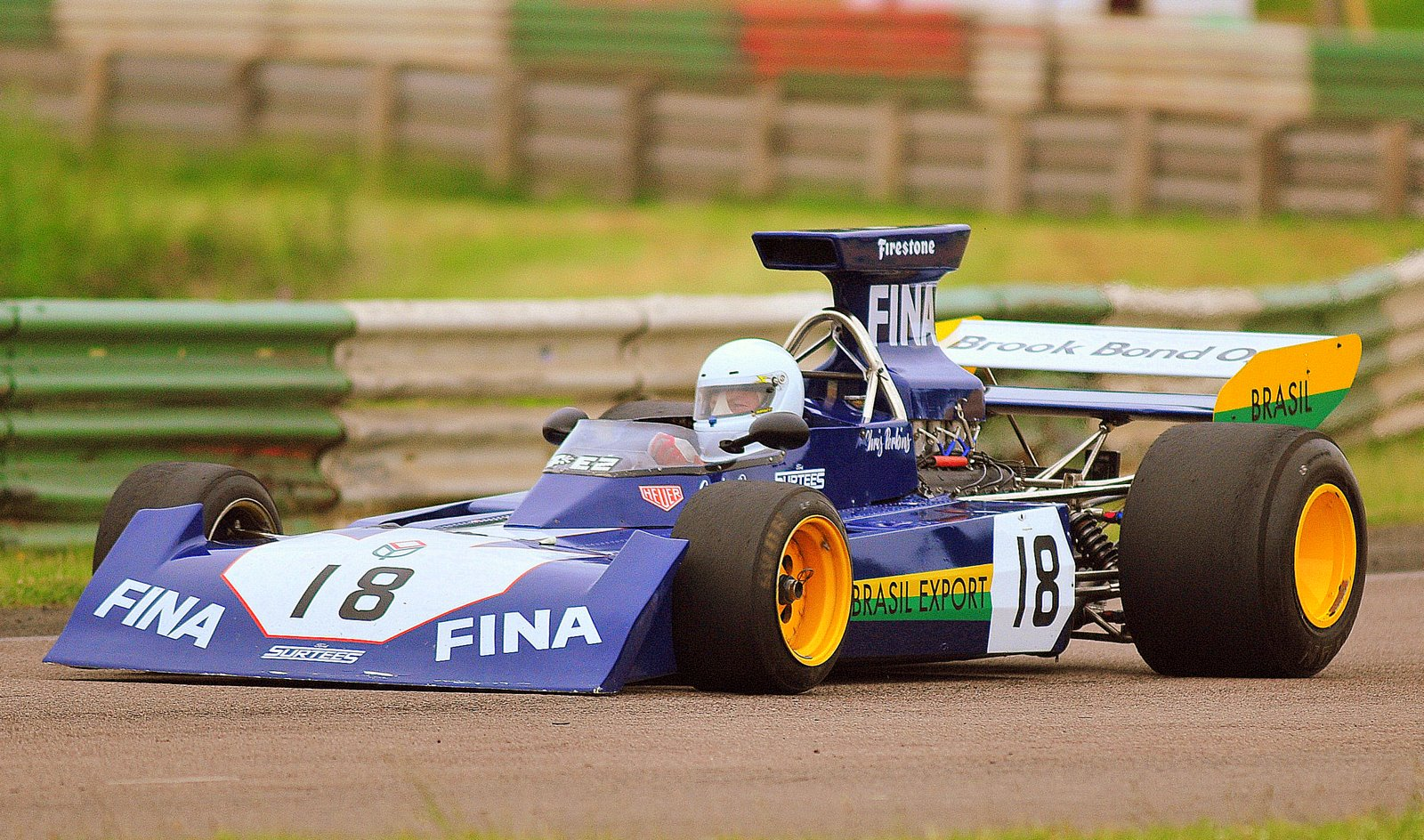
The TS14 being driven at Mallory Park in 2009.

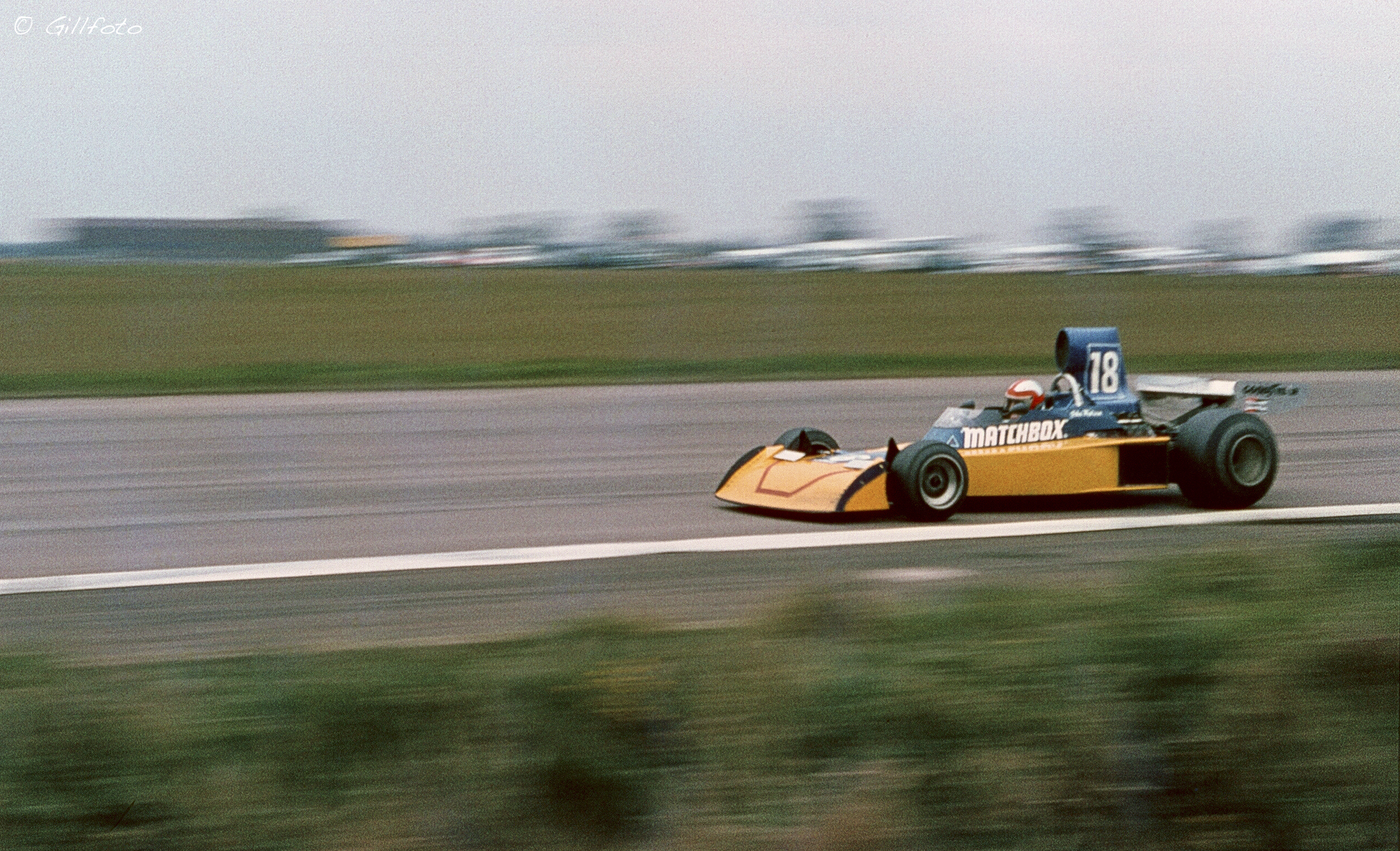
John Watson in the TS16 at the 1975 BRDC International Trophy.

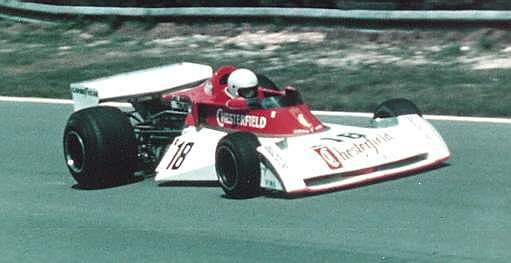
Brett Lunger entering Hawthorn's Bend at Brands Hatch during the 1976 British Grand Prix in a TS19.

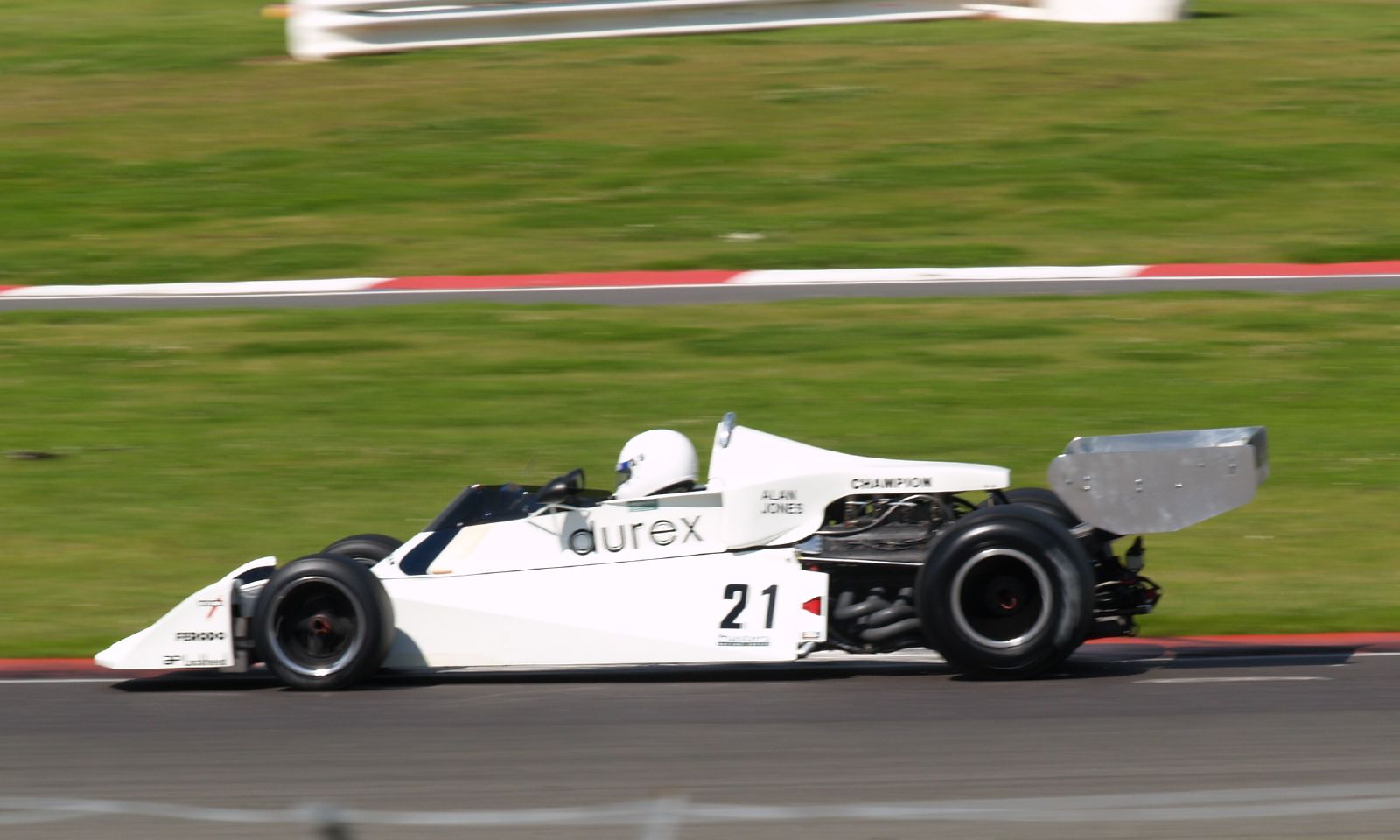
Alan Jones' 1976 TS19 being driven in 2007.

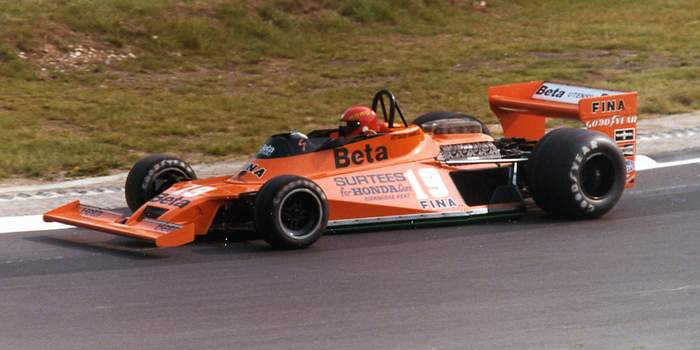
Vittorio Brambilla driving the TS20 at the 1978 British Grand Prix.

== Complete Formula One World Championship results ==
The first table below details the complete World Championship Grand Prix results for the Surtees "works" team. The second table includes results from privately owned Surtees cars in World Championship Grands Prix.

=== Works team entries ===
(key)

Year	Chassis	Engines	Tyres	Drivers	1	2	3	4	5	6	7	8	9	10	11	12	13	14	15	16	17	Points	WCC
1970	McLaren M7C	Ford Cosworth DFV 3.0 V8	F		RSA	ESP	MON	BEL	NED	FRA	GBR	GER	AUT	ITA	CAN	USA	MEX					—N/a (Note: Not entered as a Constructor.)	
1970	McLaren M7C	Ford Cosworth DFV 3.0 V8	F	(United Kingdom) John Surtees	Ret	Ret	Ret		6													—N/a	
1970	TS7	Ford Cosworth DFV 3.0 V8	F	(United Kingdom) John Surtees							Ret	9	Ret	Ret	5	Ret	8					3	8th
1970	TS7	Ford Cosworth DFV 3.0 V8	F	(United Kingdom) Derek Bell												6						3	8th
1971	TS7; TS9	Ford Cosworth DFV 3.0 V8	F		RSA	ESP	MON	NED	FRA	GBR	GER	AUT	ITA	CAN	USA							8	8th
1971	TS7; TS9	Ford Cosworth DFV 3.0 V8	F	(United Kingdom) John Surtees	Ret	11	7	5	8	6	7	Ret	Ret	11	17							8	8th
1971	TS7; TS9	Ford Cosworth DFV 3.0 V8	F	(Germany) Rolf Stommelen	12	Ret	6	DSQ	11	5	10	7	DNS	Ret								8	8th
1971	TS7; TS9	Ford Cosworth DFV 3.0 V8	F	(United Kingdom) Brian Redman	7																	8	8th
1971	TS7; TS9	Ford Cosworth DFV 3.0 V8	F	(United Kingdom) Derek Bell						Ret												8	8th
1971	TS7; TS9	Ford Cosworth DFV 3.0 V8	F	(United Kingdom) Mike Hailwood									4		15							8	8th
1971	TS7; TS9	Ford Cosworth DFV 3.0 V8	F	(United States) Sam Posey											Ret							8	8th
1971	TS7; TS9	Ford Cosworth DFV 3.0 V8	F	(Netherlands) Gijs van Lennep											DNS							8	8th
1972	TS9B; TS14	Ford Cosworth DFV 3.0 V8	F		ARG	RSA	ESP	MON	BEL	FRA	GBR	GER	AUT	ITA	CAN	USA						18	5th
1972	TS9B; TS14	Ford Cosworth DFV 3.0 V8	F	(Australia) Tim Schenken	5	Ret	8	Ret	Ret	17	Ret	14	11	Ret	7	Ret						18	5th
1972	TS9B; TS14	Ford Cosworth DFV 3.0 V8	F	(Italy) Andrea de Adamich	Ret	NC	4	7	Ret	14	Ret	13	14	Ret	Ret	Ret						18	5th
1972	TS9B; TS14	Ford Cosworth DFV 3.0 V8	F	(United Kingdom) Mike Hailwood		Ret^{F}	Ret	Ret	4	6	Ret	Ret	4	2		17						18	5th
1972	TS9B; TS14	Ford Cosworth DFV 3.0 V8	F	(United Kingdom) John Surtees										Ret		DNS						18	5th
1973	TS9B; TS14A	Ford Cosworth DFV 3.0 V8	F		ARG	BRA	RSA	ESP	BEL	MON	SWE	FRA	GBR	NED	GER	AUT	ITA	CAN	USA			7	7th
1973	TS9B; TS14A	Ford Cosworth DFV 3.0 V8	F	(United Kingdom) Mike Hailwood	Ret	Ret	Ret	Ret	Ret	8	Ret	Ret	Ret	Ret	14	10	7	9	Ret			7	7th
1973	TS9B; TS14A	Ford Cosworth DFV 3.0 V8	F	(Brazil) Carlos Pace	Ret	Ret	Ret	Ret	8	Ret	10	13	Ret	7	4^{F}	3^{F}	Ret	Ret	Ret			7	7th
1973	TS9B; TS14A	Ford Cosworth DFV 3.0 V8	F	(Brazil) Luiz Bueno		12																7	7th
1973	TS9B; TS14A	Ford Cosworth DFV 3.0 V8	F	(Italy) Andrea de Adamich			8															7	7th
1973	TS9B; TS14A	Ford Cosworth DFV 3.0 V8	F	(Germany) Jochen Mass									Ret		7				Ret			7	7th
1974	TS16	Ford Cosworth DFV 3.0 V8	F		ARG	BRA	RSA	ESP	BEL	MON	SWE	NED	FRA	GBR	GER	AUT	ITA	CAN	USA			3	11th
1974	TS16	Ford Cosworth DFV 3.0 V8	F	(Brazil) Carlos Pace	Ret	4	11	13	Ret	Ret	Ret											3	11th
1974	TS16	Ford Cosworth DFV 3.0 V8	F	(France) José Dolhem									DNQ				DNQ		Ret			3	11th
1974	TS16	Ford Cosworth DFV 3.0 V8	F	(United Kingdom) Derek Bell										DNQ	11	DNQ	DNQ	DNQ				3	11th
1974	TS16	Ford Cosworth DFV 3.0 V8	F	(Germany) Jochen Mass	Ret	17	Ret	Ret	Ret	DNS	Ret	Ret	Ret	14	Ret							3	11th
1974	TS16	Ford Cosworth DFV 3.0 V8	F	(France) Jean-Pierre Jabouille												DNQ						3	11th
1974	TS16	Ford Cosworth DFV 3.0 V8	F	(Austria) Helmut Koinigg														10	Ret			3	11th
1974	TS16	Ford Cosworth DFV 3.0 V8	F	(Austria) Dieter Quester												9						3	11th
1975	TS16	Ford Cosworth DFV 3.0 V8	G		ARG	BRA	RSA	ESP	MON	BEL	SWE	NED	FRA	GBR	GER	AUT	ITA	USA				0	14th
1975	TS16	Ford Cosworth DFV 3.0 V8	G	(United Kingdom) John Watson	DSQ	10	Ret	8	Ret	10	16	Ret	13	11		10						0	14th
1975	TS16	Ford Cosworth DFV 3.0 V8	G	(United Kingdom) Dave Morgan										18								0	14th
1976	TS19	Ford Cosworth DFV 3.0 V8	G		BRA	RSA	USW	ESP	BEL	MON	SWE	FRA	GBR	GER	AUT	NED	ITA	CAN	USA	JPN		7	10th
1976	TS19	Ford Cosworth DFV 3.0 V8	G	(United States) Brett Lunger		11	DNQ	DNQ	Ret		15	16	Ret	Ret	10		14	15	11			7	10th
1976	TS19	Ford Cosworth DFV 3.0 V8	G	(Sweden) Conny Andersson												Ret						7	10th
1976	TS19	Ford Cosworth DFV 3.0 V8	G	(Japan) Noritake Takahara																9		7	10th
1976	TS19	Ford Cosworth DFV 3.0 V8	G	(Australia) Alan Jones			NC	9	5	Ret	13	Ret	5	10	Ret	8	12	16	8	4		7	10th
1977	TS19	Ford Cosworth DFV 3.0 V8	G		ARG	BRA	RSA	USW	ESP	MON	BEL	SWE	FRA	GBR	GER	AUT	NED	ITA	USA	CAN	JPN	6	11th
1977	TS19	Ford Cosworth DFV 3.0 V8	G	(Italy) Vittorio Brambilla	7	Ret	7	Ret	Ret	8	4	Ret	13	8	5	15	12	Ret	19	6	8	6	11th
1977	TS19	Ford Cosworth DFV 3.0 V8	G	(Austria) Hans Binder	Ret	Ret	11	11	9	Ret									11	Ret	Ret	6	11th
1977	TS19	Ford Cosworth DFV 3.0 V8	G	(Australia) Larry Perkins							12	DNQ	DNQ									6	11th
1977	TS19	Ford Cosworth DFV 3.0 V8	G	(France) Patrick Tambay									DNQ									6	11th
1977	TS19	Ford Cosworth DFV 3.0 V8	G	(Australia) Vern Schuppan										12	7	16	DNQ					6	11th
1977	TS19	Ford Cosworth DFV 3.0 V8	G	(Italy) Lamberto Leoni														DNQ				6	11th
1978	TS19; TS20	Ford Cosworth DFV 3.0 V8	G		ARG	BRA	RSA	USW	MON	BEL	ESP	SWE	FRA	GBR	GER	AUT	NED	ITA	USA	CAN		1	13th
1978	TS19; TS20	Ford Cosworth DFV 3.0 V8	G	(United Kingdom) Rupert Keegan	Ret	Ret	Ret	DNS	Ret	DNQ	11	DNQ	Ret	DNQ	DNQ	DNQ	DNS					1	13th
1978	TS19; TS20	Ford Cosworth DFV 3.0 V8	G	(Italy) Gimax														DNQ				1	13th
1978	TS19; TS20	Ford Cosworth DFV 3.0 V8	G	(France) René Arnoux															9	Ret		1	13th
1978	TS19; TS20	Ford Cosworth DFV 3.0 V8	G	(Italy) Vittorio Brambilla	18	DNQ	12	Ret	DNQ	13	7	Ret	17	9	Ret	6	DSQ	Ret				1	13th
1978	TS19; TS20	Ford Cosworth DFV 3.0 V8	G	(Italy) Beppe Gabbiani															DNQ	DNQ		1	13th

=== Results of other Surtees cars ===
(key)

Year	Entrant	Chassis	Engines	Tyres	Drivers	1	2	3	4	5	6	7	8	9	10	11	12	13	14	15	16	17
1971	Stichting Autoraces Nederland	TS7	Ford Cosworth DFV 3.0 V8	F		RSA	ESP	MON	NED	FRA	GBR	GER	AUT	ITA	CAN	USA						
1971	Stichting Autoraces Nederland	TS7	Ford Cosworth DFV 3.0 V8	F	(Netherlands) Gijs van Lennep				8													
1972	Team Gunston	TS9	Ford Cosworth DFV 3.0 V8	G		ARG	RSA	ESP	MON	BEL	FRA	GBR	GER	AUT	ITA	CAN	USA					
1972	Team Gunston	TS9	Ford Cosworth DFV 3.0 V8	G	(Rhodesia) John Love		16															
1972	Champcar Inc.	TS9B	Ford Cosworth DFV 3.0 V8	G	(United States) Sam Posey												12					
1974	AAW Racing	TS16	Ford Cosworth DFV 3.0 V8	F		ARG	BRA	RSA	ESP	BEL	MON	SWE	NED	FRA	GBR	GER	AUT	ITA	CAN	USA		
1974	AAW Racing	TS16	Ford Cosworth DFV 3.0 V8	F	(Finland) Leo Kinnunen					DNQ		Ret		DNQ	DNQ		DNQ	DNQ				
1976	Team Norev Racing with BS Fabrications	TS19	Ford Cosworth DFV 3.0 V8	G		BRA	RSA	USW	ESP	BEL	MON	SWE	FRA	GBR	GER	AUT	NED	ITA	CAN	USA	JPN	
1976	Team Norev Racing with BS Fabrications	TS19	Ford Cosworth DFV 3.0 V8	G	(France) Henri Pescarolo						DNQ		Ret	Ret	DNQ	9	11	17	19	NC		
1976	ShellSport Whiting	TS16	Ford Cosworth DFV 3.0 V8	G	(United Kingdom) Divina Galica									DNQ								
1977	Melchester Racing	TS19	Ford Cosworth DFV 3.0 V8	G		ARG	BRA	RSA	USW	ESP	MON	BEL	SWE	FRA	GBR	GER	AUT	NED	ITA	USA	CAN	JPN
1977	Melchester Racing	TS19	Ford Cosworth DFV 3.0 V8	G	(United Kingdom) Tony Trimmer										DNPQ							

== Can-Am results ==
Year	Chassis	Engine(s)	Drivers	1	2	3	4	5	6	Pos	Pts
1966	Lola T70 Mk.2	Chevrolet		MNT	BRD	CAN	LGS	RIV	STA		
1966	Lola T70 Mk.2	Chevrolet	(United Kingdom) John Surtees	1	Ret	Ret	12	1	1	1st	27
1966	Lola T70 Mk.2	Chevrolet	(United Kingdom) Graham Hill					3		9th	4
1967	Lola T70 Mk.2/3B	Chevrolet		ROA	BRD	MNT	LGS	RIV	STA		
1967	Lola T70 Mk.2/3B	Chevrolet	(United Kingdom) John Surtees	3	4	Ret	Ret	Ret	1	3rd	16
