= Reine Wisell =

Swedish racing driver (1941–2022)

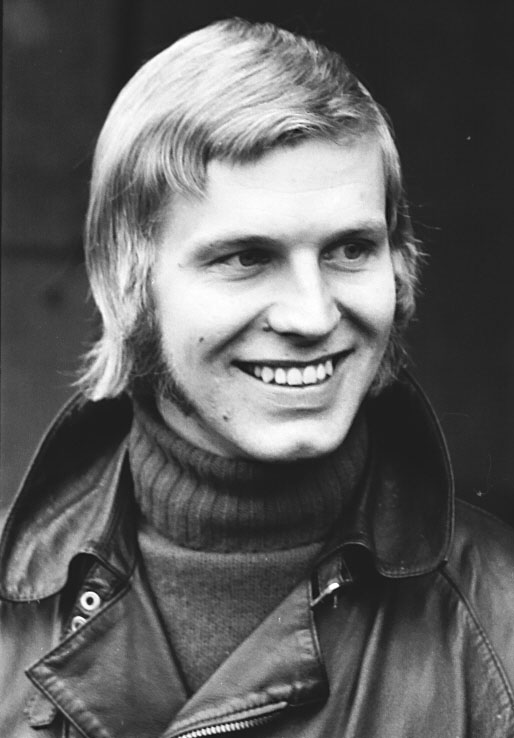
- Wisell in 1970
- Born: Reine Tore Leif Wisell; 30 September 1941; Motala, Sweden
- Died: 20 March 2022 (aged 80); Pattaya, Thailand

Formula One World Championship career
- Nationality: (Sweden) Swedish
- Active years: 1970 – 1974
- Team(s): Lotus, BRM, March inc. non-works
- Entries: 23 (22 starts)
- Championships: 0
- Wins: 0
- Podiums: 1
- Career points: 13
- Pole positions: 0
- Fastest laps: 0
- First entry: 1970 United States Grand Prix
- Last entry: 1974 Swedish Grand Prix

Reine Tore Leif Wisell (30 September 1941 – 20 March 2022) was a Swedish racing driver. He participated in 23 Formula One World Championship Grands Prix, debuting on 4 October 1970. He achieved one podium, and scored a total of 13 championship points.

== Career ==
Wisell won the Swedish Formula Three Championship in 1967.

In 1970, Wisell entered Formula One with Team Lotus as a late-season replacement for John Miles, who had departed after team leader Jochen Rindt had been killed at Monza on 5 September. Wisell’s debut was in October at the 1970 United States Grand Prix at Watkins Glen. The race was the best result of his Formula One career with a third-place finish, trailing only his teammate and future champion Emerson Fittipaldi and Pedro Rodríguez and finishing ahead of title contender Jacky Ickx. Subsequent races for Team Lotus were less successful and he was dropped by the team at the end of the 1971 season. He continued to compete in Formula One with BRM and March. He also participated in several non-Championship Formula One races. Wisell retired in 1974 after his home Grand Prix.

== Death ==
Wisell died suddenly on 20 March 2022, aged 80, in his Thailand home.

== Career results ==
=== Complete Formula One World Championship results ===
(key)

Year	Entrant	Chassis	Engine	1	2	3	4	5	6	7	8	9	10	11	12	13	14	15	WDC	Points
1970	Gold Leaf Team Lotus	Lotus 72C	Cosworth V8	RSA	ESP	MON	BEL	NED	FRA	GBR	GER	AUT	ITA	CAN	USA; 3	MEX; NC			16th	4
1971	Gold Leaf Team Lotus	Lotus 72C	Cosworth V8	RSA; 4	ESP; NC	MON; Ret													12th	9
1971	Gold Leaf Team Lotus	Lotus 72D	Cosworth V8				NED; DSQ	FRA; 6		GER; 8	AUT; 4	ITA	CAN; 5	USA; Ret					12th	9
1971	Gold Leaf Team Lotus	Lotus 56B	Pratt & Whitney Turbine						GBR; NC										12th	9
1972	Marlboro BRM	BRM P153	BRM V12	ARG; Ret															NC	0
1972	Marlboro BRM	BRM P160B	BRM V12		RSA	ESP; Ret	MON; Ret	BEL	FRA; Ret	GBR									NC	0
1972	Marlboro BRM	BRM P160C	BRM V12								GER; Ret	AUT	ITA; 12						NC	0
1972	John Player Team Lotus	Lotus 72D	Cosworth V8											CAN; Ret	USA; 10				NC	0
1973	Team Pierre Robert	March 731	Cosworth V8	ARG	BRA	RSA	ESP	BEL	MON	SWE; DNS									NC	0
1973	Clarke-Mordaunt-Guthrie-Durlacher	March 731	Cosworth V8								FRA; Ret	GBR	NED	GER	AUT	ITA	CAN	USA	NC	0
1974	March Engineering	March 741	Cosworth V8	ARG	BRA	RSA	ESP	BEL	MON	SWE; Ret	NED	FRA	GBR	GER	AUT	ITA	CAN	USA	NC	0

=== 24 Hours of Le Mans results ===
Year	Team	Co-drivers	Car	Class	Laps	Pos.	Class pos.
1969	(Switzerland) Scuderia Filipinetti	(France) Henri Greder	Chevrolet Corvette C3	GT +2.0	196	DNF	DNF
1970	(Switzerland) Scuderia Filipinetti	(Sweden) Jo Bonnier	Ferrari 512S	S 5.0	36	DNF	DNF
1973	(France) Équipe Gitanes	(Belgium) Baron Hughes de Fierlandt (France) Jean-Louis Lafosse	Lola T282-Ford Cosworth	S 3.0	164	DNF	DNF
1974	(United Kingdom) Gulf Research Racing	(Australia) Vern Schuppan	Gulf GR7-Cosworth	S 3.0	49	DNF	DNF

Sporting positions
Preceded by Freddy Kottulinsky	Swedish Formula Three Champion; 1967	Succeeded by Ronnie Peterson
