= 1971 British Grand Prix =

- Race 6 of 11 in the 1971 Formula One season
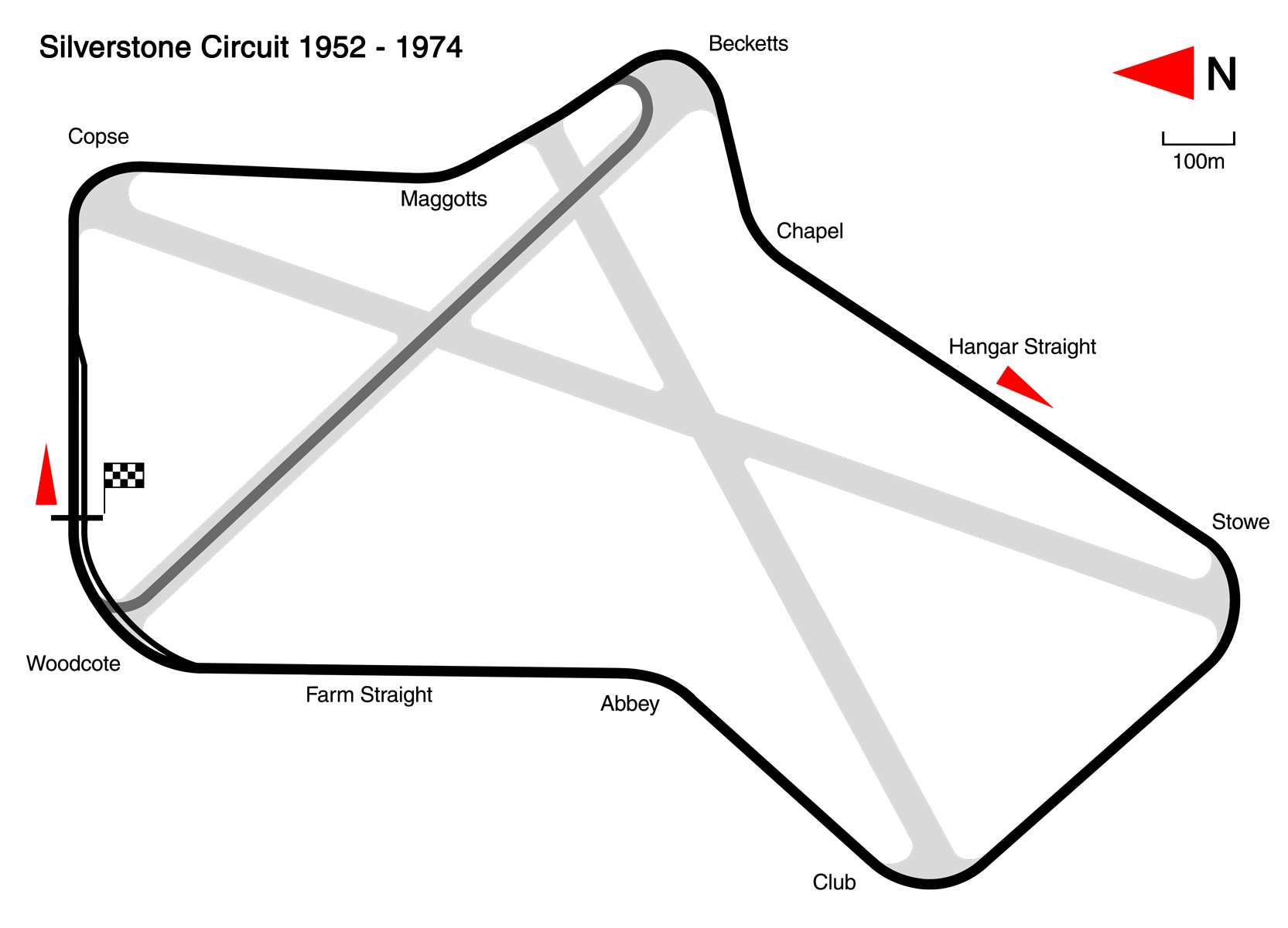
- The Silverstone Circuit (1952–1974)

Race details
- Date: 17 July 1971
- Official name: XXIV The Woolmark British Grand Prix
- Location: Silverstone Circuit, Northamptonshire and Buckinghamshire, England
- Course: Permanent racing facility
- Course length: 4.711 km (2.927 miles)
- Distance: 68 laps, 320.348 km (199.036 miles)
- Weather: Overcast, dry

Pole position
Driver	(Switzerland) Clay Regazzoni	Ferrari
- Time: 1:18.1

Fastest lap
Driver	(United Kingdom) Jackie Stewart	Tyrrell-Ford
- Time: 1:19.9

Podium
First	(United Kingdom) Jackie Stewart	Tyrrell-Ford
Second	(Sweden) Ronnie Peterson	March-Ford
Third	(Brazil) Emerson Fittipaldi	Lotus-Ford

The 1971 British Grand Prix was a Formula One motor race held at Silverstone on 17 July 1971. It was race 6 of 11 in both the 1971 World Championship of Drivers and the 1971 International Cup for Formula One Manufacturers. The 68-lap race was won by Tyrrell driver Jackie Stewart after he started from second position. Ronnie Peterson finished second for the March team and Lotus driver Emerson Fittipaldi came in third.

== Race report ==
On one of the fastest circuits on the calendar, horsepower counted for everything. Clay Regazzoni, driving for Ferrari, gained pole with a scorching lap of 1 min 18.1 secs, beating Jackie Stewart in a Tyrrell and Jo Siffert in a BRM by just a couple of hundredths of a second. BRM were mourning the loss of Pedro Rodríguez in a sports car race a few days earlier.

The start itself was a shambles, with a bungled flag drop causing a collision between Jackie Oliver and Graham Hill, for which Oliver was fined £50. Regazzoni led away from Jacky Ickx and Stewart, but after just one lap Stewart had passed Ickx, with Siffert following him. On lap 4, Stewart passed Regazzoni and disappeared into the distance. By lap 10 he was over 3 seconds ahead. In the points positions, Emerson Fittipaldi, Ronnie Peterson and Tim Schenken were having a memorable tussle. Regazzoni repassed Siffert who was suffering from vibration problems on lap 15, but the BRM driver managed to hang on to the back of the Ferrari for several more laps. Stewart increased his lead to 14 seconds and by lap 20 he was ahead by 18 seconds. Ickx dropped out of fourth place with rubber breaking off from his front left tyre, and Siffert dropped way down with a broken coil bracket. The battle between Peterson, Schenken and Fittipaldi moved up into 3rd, 4th and 5th places.

On lap 48, tyre problems struck Regazzoni and further problems ensued when he tried to leave the pits after his tyre change to find his engine had no oil pressure. Schenken too dropped down the field with gearbox problems and retired completely when it jammed for good 4 laps from home.

Henri Pescarolo and Rolf Stommelen thus moved up into the battle for 4th and 5th, duelling right to the line, with Pescarolo winning out by just 0.5 seconds. John Surtees gained 6th place.

Stewart took a commanding home win and extended his lead in the Championship to 23 points.

== Classification ==
=== Qualifying ===
Pos	No	Driver	Constructor	Time	Gap
1	5	(Switzerland) Clay Regazzoni	Ferrari	1:18.1	—
2	12	(United Kingdom) Jackie Stewart	Tyrrell-Ford	1:18.1	+0.0
3	16	(Switzerland) Jo Siffert	BRM	1:18.2	+0.1
4	1	(Brazil) Emerson Fittipaldi	Lotus-Ford	1:18.3	+0.2
5	18	(Sweden) Ronnie Peterson	March-Ford	1:19.0	+0.9
6	4	(Belgium) Jacky Ickx	Ferrari	1:19.5	+1.4
7	8	(Australia) Tim Schenken	Brabham-Ford	1:19.5	+1.4
8	9	(New Zealand) Denny Hulme	McLaren-Ford	1:19.6	+1.5
9	21	(New Zealand) Chris Amon	Matra	1:19.7	+1.6
10	14	(France) François Cevert	Tyrrell-Ford	1:19.8	+1.7
11	17	(New Zealand) Howden Ganley	BRM	1:19.84	+1.74
12	24	(Germany) Rolf Stommelen	Surtees-Ford	1:19.88	+1.78
13	2	(South Africa) Dave Charlton	Lotus-Ford	1:20.05	+1.95
14	10	(United Kingdom) Peter Gethin	McLaren-Ford	1:20.1	+2.0
15	22	(France) Jean-Pierre Beltoise	Matra	1:20.2	+2.1
16	7	(United Kingdom) Graham Hill	Brabham-Ford	1:20.3	+2.2
17	26	(France) Henri Pescarolo	March-Ford	1:20.5	+2.4
18	23	(United Kingdom) John Surtees	Surtees-Ford	1:20.6	+2.5
19	3	(Sweden) Reine Wisell	Lotus-Pratt & Whitney	1:20.66	+2.56
20	6	(United Kingdom) Mike Beuttler	March-Ford	1:20.7	+2.6
21	20	(Italy) Nanni Galli	March-Ford	1:20.9	+2.8
22	11	(United Kingdom) Jackie Oliver	McLaren-Ford	1:21.0	+2.9
23	25	(United Kingdom) Derek Bell	Surtees-Ford	1:22.3	+4.2
24	19	(Italy) Andrea de Adamich	March-Alfa Romeo	1:23.2	+5.1

=== Race ===
Pos	No	Driver	Constructor	Laps	Time/Retired	Grid	Points
1	12	(United Kingdom) Jackie Stewart	Tyrrell-Ford	68	1:31:31.5	2	9
2	18	(Sweden) Ronnie Peterson	March-Ford	68	+ 36.1	5	6
3	1	(Brazil) Emerson Fittipaldi	Lotus-Ford	68	+ 50.5	4	4
4	26	(France) Henri Pescarolo	March-Ford	67	+ 1 lap	17	3
5	24	(Germany) Rolf Stommelen	Surtees-Ford	67	+ 1 lap	12	2
6	23	(United Kingdom) John Surtees	Surtees-Ford	67	+ 1 lap	18	1
7	22	(France) Jean-Pierre Beltoise	Matra	66	+ 2 laps	15	
8	17	(New Zealand) Howden Ganley	BRM	66	+ 2 laps	11	
9	16	(Switzerland) Jo Siffert	BRM	66	+ 2 laps	3	
10	14	(France) François Cevert	Tyrrell-Ford	65	+ 3 laps	10	
11	20	(Italy) Nanni Galli	March-Ford	65	+ 3 laps	21	
12	8	(Australia) Tim Schenken	Brabham-Ford	63	Gearbox	7	
NC	3	(Sweden) Reine Wisell	Lotus-Pratt & Whitney	57	+ 11 laps	19	
NC	19	(Italy) Andrea de Adamich	March-Alfa Romeo	56	+ 12 laps	24	
Ret	10	(United Kingdom) Peter Gethin	McLaren-Ford	53	Engine	14	
Ret	4	(Belgium) Jacky Ickx	Ferrari	51	Engine	6	
Ret	5	(Switzerland) Clay Regazzoni	Ferrari	48	Oil pressure	1	
Ret	21	(New Zealand) Chris Amon	Matra	35	Engine	9	
Ret	9	(New Zealand) Denny Hulme	McLaren-Ford	32	Engine	8	
Ret	25	(United Kingdom) Derek Bell	Surtees-Ford	23	Suspension	23	
Ret	6	(United Kingdom) Mike Beuttler	March-Ford	21	Oil pressure	20	
Ret	2	(South Africa) Dave Charlton	Lotus-Ford	1	Engine	13	
Ret	7	(United Kingdom) Graham Hill	Brabham-Ford	0	Accident	22	
Ret	11	(United Kingdom) Jackie Oliver	McLaren-Ford	0	Accident	16	

== Notes ==
- This was the Formula One World Championship debut for British driver Mike Beuttler.
- This race saw the 10th podium finish for a March.

== Championship standings after the race ==
Drivers' Championship standings

	Pos	Driver	Points
	1	(United Kingdom) **Jackie Stewart***	42
	2	(Belgium) **Jacky Ickx***	19
2	3	(Sweden) **Ronnie Peterson***	15
5	4	(Brazil) **Emerson Fittipaldi***	10
2	5	(United States) **Mario Andretti***	9

Constructors' Championship standings

	Pos	Constructor	Points
	1	(United Kingdom) **Tyrrell-Ford***	42
	2	(Italy) **Ferrari***	28
1	3	(United Kingdom) **March-Ford***	15
1	4	(United Kingdom) **Lotus-Ford***	13
2	5	(United Kingdom) **BRM***	12

- Note: Only the top five positions are included for both sets of standings.
- Competitors in bold and marked with an asterisk still had a theoretical chance of becoming World Champion.

Previous race: 1971 French Grand Prix	FIA Formula One World Championship; 1971 season	Next race: 1971 German Grand Prix
Previous race: 1970 British Grand Prix	British Grand Prix	Next race: 1972 British Grand Prix
