= 1971 Dutch Grand Prix =

- Zandvoort original layout

Race details
- Date: 20 June 1971
- Official name: XIX Grote Prijs van Nederland
- Location: Circuit Zandvoort, Zandvoort, Netherlands
- Course: Permanent racing facility
- Course length: 4.193 km (2.605 miles)
- Distance: 70 laps, 293.51 km (182.35 miles)
- Weather: Wet

Pole position
Driver	(Belgium) Jacky Ickx	Ferrari
- Time: 1:17.42

Fastest lap
Driver	(Belgium) Jacky Ickx	Ferrari
- Time: 1:34.95 on lap 49

Podium
First	(Belgium) Jacky Ickx	Ferrari
Second	(Mexico) Pedro Rodríguez	BRM
Third	(Switzerland) Clay Regazzoni	Ferrari

The 1971 Dutch Grand Prix was a Formula One motor race held at Zandvoort on 20 June 1971. It was race 4 of 11 in both the 1971 World Championship of Drivers and the 1971 International Cup for Formula One Manufacturers. Due to heavy rain, the track was treacherously wet and slippery, giving a large advantage to "wet-weather men" Jacky Ickx and Pedro Rodriguez, who also happened to be equipped with highly suitable cars and tyres.

== Classification ==
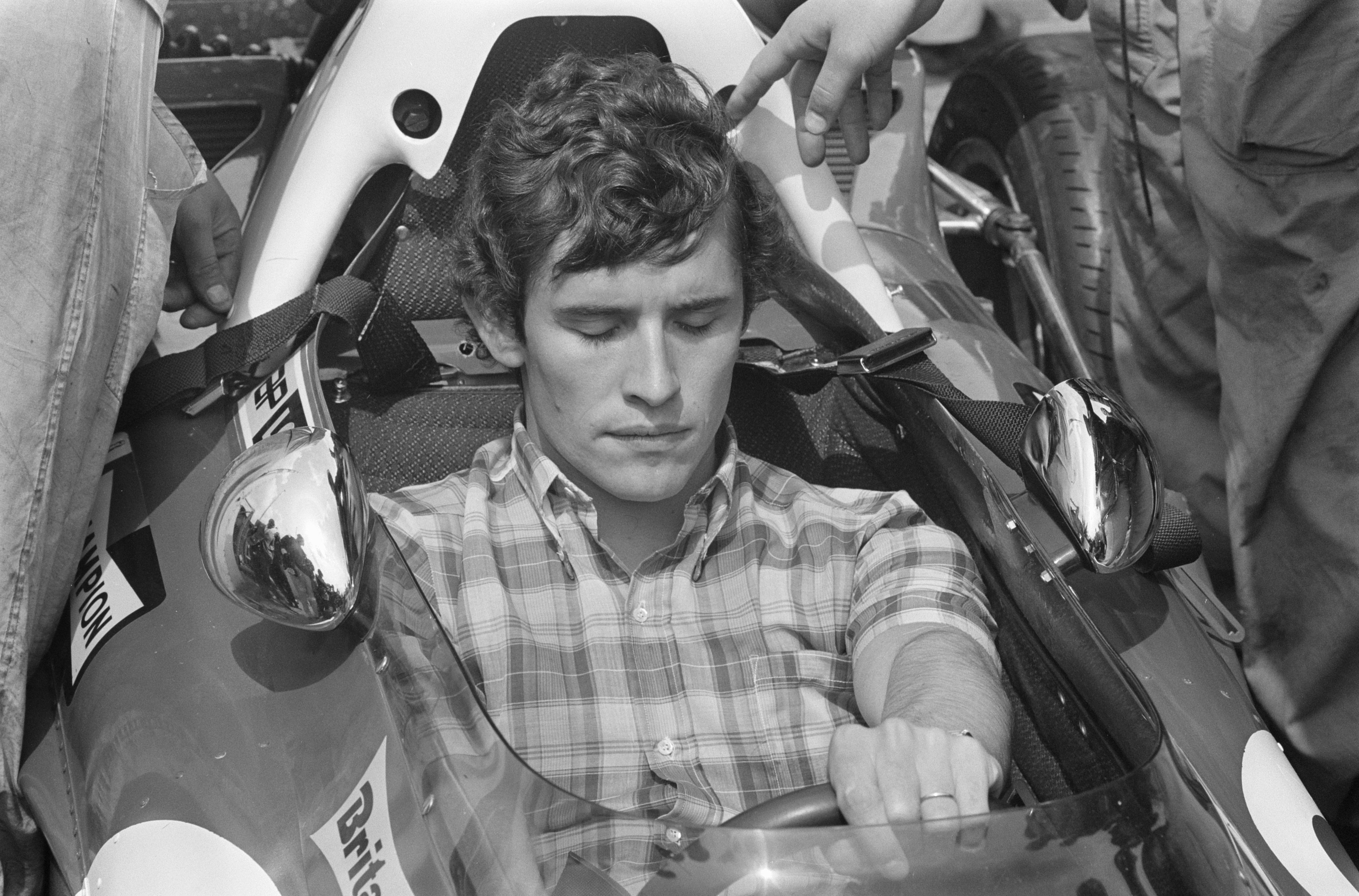
Jacky Ickx (pictured during the race weekend) took the race win, pole position and fastest lap.

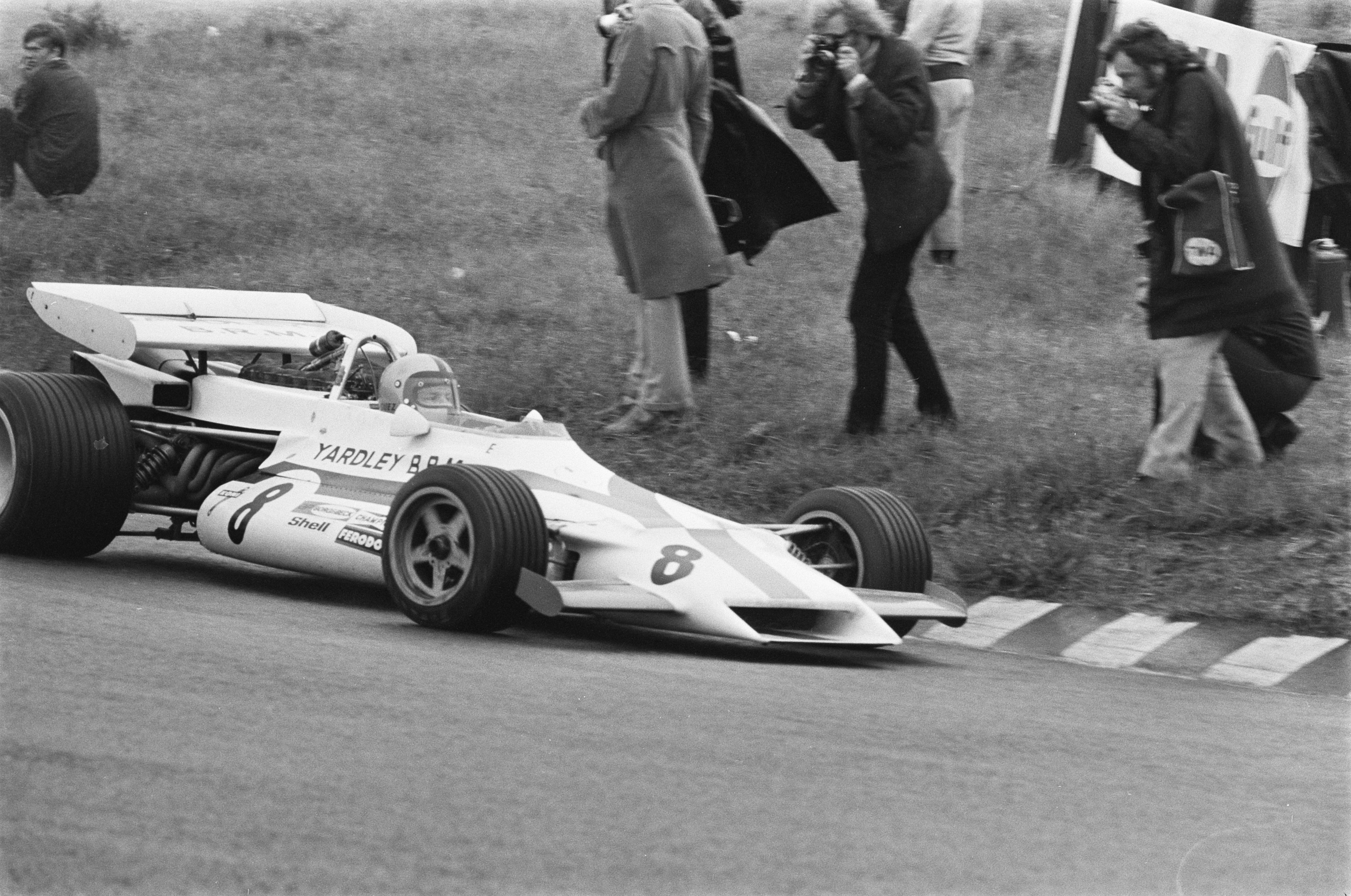
Pedro Rodríguez finished second.

=== Qualifying ===
Pos	No	Driver	Constructor	Time	Gap
1	2	(Belgium) Jacky Ickx	Ferrari	1:17.42	—
2	8	(Mexico) Pedro Rodriguez	BRM	1:17.46	+0.04
3	5	(United Kingdom) Jackie Stewart	Tyrrell-Ford	1:17.64	+0.22
4	3	(Switzerland) Clay Regazzoni	Ferrari	1:17.98	+0.54
5	20	(New Zealand) Chris Amon	Matra	1:18.46	+1.04
6	14	(Sweden) Reine Wisell	Lotus-Ford	1:18.70	+1.28
7	23	(United Kingdom) John Surtees	Surtees-Ford	1:18.71	+1.29
8	9	(Switzerland) Jo Siffert	BRM	1:18.91	+1.49
9	10	(New Zealand) Howden Ganley	BRM	1:19.09	+1.67
10	29	(Germany) Rolf Stommelen	Surtees-Ford	1:19.11	+1.69
11	21	(France) Jean-Pierre Beltoise	Matra	1:19.16	+1.74
12	6	(France) François Cevert	Tyrrell-Ford	1:19.54	+2.12
13	16	(Sweden) Ronnie Peterson ^{1}	March-Ford	1:19.73	+2.31
14	26	(New Zealand) Denny Hulme	McLaren-Ford	1:19.74	+2.32
15	31	(France) Henri Pescarolo	March-Ford	1:20.01	+2.59
16	24	(United Kingdom) Graham Hill	Brabham-Ford	1:20.07	+2.65
17	19	(Spain) Alex Soler-Roig	March-Ford	1:20.26	+2.84
18	4	(United States) Mario Andretti	Ferrari	1:20.32	+2.90
19	25	(Australia) Tim Schenken	Brabham-Ford	1:20.35	+2.93
20	18	(Italy) Nanni Galli	March-Alfa Romeo	1:20.61	+3.19
21	30	(Netherlands) Gijs van Lennep	Surtees-Ford	1:20.79	+3.37
22	15	(Australia) Dave Walker	Lotus-Pratt & Whitney	1:21.83	+4.41
23	28	(United Kingdom) Peter Gethin	McLaren-Ford	1:22.07	+4.65
24	22	(United States) Skip Barber	March-Ford	1:22.19	+4.77

1. Peterson set his time in the March-Alfa Romeo

=== Race ===
Pos	No	Driver	Constructor	Laps	Time/Retired	Grid	Points
1	2	(Belgium) Jacky Ickx	Ferrari	70	1:56:20.0	1	9
2	8	(Mexico) Pedro Rodriguez	BRM	70	+ 7.99	2	6
3	3	(Switzerland) Clay Regazzoni	Ferrari	69	+ 1 lap	4	4
4	16	(Sweden) Ronnie Peterson	March-Ford	68	+ 2 laps	13	3
5	23	(United Kingdom) John Surtees	Surtees-Ford	68	+ 2 laps	7	2
6	9	(Switzerland) Jo Siffert	BRM	68	+ 2 laps	8	1
7	10	(New Zealand) Howden Ganley	BRM	66	+ 4 laps	9	
8	30	(Netherlands) Gijs van Lennep	Surtees-Ford	65	+ 5 laps	21	
9	21	(France) Jean-Pierre Beltoise	Matra	65	+ 5 laps	11	
10	24	(United Kingdom) Graham Hill	Brabham-Ford	65	+ 5 laps	16	
11	5	(United Kingdom) Jackie Stewart	Tyrrell-Ford	65	+ 5 laps	3	
12	26	(New Zealand) Denny Hulme	McLaren-Ford	63	+ 7 laps	14	
NC	31	(France) Henri Pescarolo	March-Ford	62	+ 8 laps	15	
NC	22	(United States) Skip Barber	March-Ford	60	+ 10 laps	24	
NC	28	(United Kingdom) Peter Gethin	McLaren-Ford	60	+ 10 laps	23	
Ret	19	(Spain) Alex Soler-Roig	March-Ford	57	Engine	17	
Ret	25	(Australia) Tim Schenken	Brabham-Ford	39	Suspension	19	
Ret	6	(France) François Cevert	Tyrrell-Ford	29	Accident	12	
DSQ	29	(Germany) Rolf Stommelen	Surtees-Ford	19	Disqualified	18	
DSQ	14	(Sweden) Reine Wisell	Lotus-Ford	17	Disqualified	4	
Ret	18	(Italy) Nanni Galli	March-Alfa Romeo	7	Accident	20	
Ret	4	(United States) Mario Andretti	Ferrari	5	Fuel pump	16	
Ret	15	(Australia) Dave Walker	Lotus-Pratt & Whitney	5	Accident	22	
Ret	20	(New Zealand) Chris Amon	Matra	2	Spun off	5	
DNS	12	(South Africa) Dave Charlton	Lotus-Ford	-	Car crashed in practice by Walker	-	

== Notes ==
- This was the Formula One World Championship debut for that year's Le Mans winner and Dutch driver Gijs van Lennep and Australian driver David Walker.
- This was the 10th fastest lap set by a Belgian driver.
- This was the 50th race for British constructor McLaren.
- This was the Formula One World Championship debut for American engine supplier Pratt & Whitney.
- For the first time in 42 races, and since the 1967 Canadian Grand Prix, a Ford-powered car did not end in a podium finish. This set a new record.

== Championship standings after the race ==
Drivers' Championship standings

	Pos	Driver	Points
	1	(United Kingdom) Jackie Stewart	24
	2	(Belgium) Jacky Ickx	19
	3	(United States) Mario Andretti	9
4	4	(Mexico) Pedro Rodríguez	9
1	5	(Sweden) Ronnie Peterson	9

Constructors' Championship standings

	Pos	Constructor	Points
1	1	(Italy) Ferrari	28
1	2	(United Kingdom) Tyrrell-Ford	24
4	3	(United Kingdom) BRM	9
1	4	(United Kingdom) March-Ford	9
1	5	(France) Matra	6

- Note: Only the top five positions are included for both sets of standings.

Previous race: 1971 Monaco Grand Prix	FIA Formula One World Championship; 1971 season	Next race: 1971 French Grand Prix
Previous race: 1970 Dutch Grand Prix	Dutch Grand Prix	Next race: 1973 Dutch Grand Prix
