= 1970 British Grand Prix =

Race details
- Date: 18 July 1970
- Official name: XXIII RAC British Grand Prix
- Location: Brands Hatch, Kent, England
- Course: Permanent racing facility
- Course length: 4.265 km (2.650 miles)
- Distance: 80 laps, 341.200 km (212.012 miles)

Pole position
Driver	(Austria) Jochen Rindt	Lotus-Ford
- Time: 1:24.8

Fastest lap
Driver	(Australia) Jack Brabham	Brabham-Ford
- Time: 1:25.9 on lap 70

Podium
First	(Austria) Jochen Rindt	Lotus-Ford
Second	(Australia) Jack Brabham	Brabham-Ford
Third	(New Zealand) Denny Hulme	McLaren-Ford

The 1970 British Grand Prix was a Formula One motor race held at Brands Hatch on 18 July 1970. It was race 7 of 13 in both the 1970 World Championship of Drivers and the 1970 International Cup for Formula One Manufacturers.

The 80-lap race was won from pole position by Austrian driver Jochen Rindt, driving a Lotus 72. Rindt took his third consecutive victory after Australian Jack Brabham, driving a Brabham BT33, ran out of fuel at the last corner while leading comfortably, and after Rindt himself had originally been disqualified for having an illegal rear wing. Brabham held on to second place, scoring what would turn out to be his final points in Formula One, with New Zealander Denny Hulme finishing third for McLaren.

This was the first Formula One race for Brazilian future World Champion Emerson Fittipaldi, who qualified 21st and finished eighth in an older Lotus 49. It was also the final F1 race for American Dan Gurney.

== Qualifying ==
=== Qualifying classification ===
Pos	No	Driver	Constructor	Time	Gap	Grid
1	5	(Austria) Jochen Rindt	Lotus-Ford	1:24.8	—	1
2	17	(Australia) Jack Brabham	Brabham-Ford	1:24.8	+0.0	2
3	3	(Belgium) Jacky Ickx	Ferrari	1:25.1	+0.3	3
4	23	(United Kingdom) Jackie Oliver	BRM	1:25.6	+0.8	4
5	9	(New Zealand) Denny Hulme	McLaren-Ford	1:25.6	+0.8	5
6	4	(Switzerland) Clay Regazzoni	Ferrari	1:25.8	+1.0	6
7	6	(United Kingdom) John Miles	Lotus-Ford	1:25.9	+1.1	7
8	1	(United Kingdom) Jackie Stewart	March-Ford	1:26.0	+1.2	8
9	26	(United States) Mario Andretti	March-Ford	1:26.2	+1.4	9
10	18	(Germany) Rolf Stommelen	Brabham-Ford	1:26.3	+1.5	DNS
11	7	(France) Jean-Pierre Beltoise	Matra	1:26.5	+1.7	10
12	10	(United States) Dan Gurney	McLaren-Ford	1:26.6	+1.8	11
13	8	(France) Henri Pescarolo	Matra	1:26.7	+1.9	12
14	27	(Sweden) Ronnie Peterson	March-Ford	1:26.8	+2.0	13
15	2	(France) François Cevert	March-Ford	1:26.8	+2.0	14
16	22	(Mexico) Pedro Rodríguez	BRM	1:26.9	+2.1	15
17	24	(Canada) George Eaton	BRM	1:26.9	+2.1	16
18	16	(New Zealand) Chris Amon	March-Ford	1:27.0	+2.2	17
19	11	(Italy) Andrea de Adamich	McLaren-Alfa Romeo	1:27.1	+2.3	18
20	20	(United Kingdom) John Surtees	Surtees-Ford	1:27.7	+2.9	19
21	15	(Switzerland) Jo Siffert	March-Ford	1:28.0	+3.2	20
22	28	(Brazil) Emerson Fittipaldi	Lotus-Ford	1:28.1	+3.3	21
23	14	(United Kingdom) Graham Hill	Lotus-Ford	1:28.4	+3.6	22
24	29	(United States) Pete Lovely	Lotus-Ford	1:30.3	+5.5	23
25	25	(United Kingdom) Brian Redman	De Tomaso-Ford	1:32.8	+8.0	DNS

== Race ==
=== Classification ===
Pos	No	Driver	Constructor	Laps	Time/Retired	Grid	Points
1	5	(Austria) Jochen Rindt	Lotus-Ford	80	1:57:02.0	1	9
2	17	(Australia) Jack Brabham	Brabham-Ford	80	+ 32.9	2	6
3	9	(New Zealand) Denny Hulme	McLaren-Ford	80	+ 54.4	5	4
4	4	(Switzerland) Clay Regazzoni	Ferrari	80	+ 54.8	6	3
5	16	(New Zealand) Chris Amon	March-Ford	79	+ 1 Lap	17	2
6	14	(United Kingdom) Graham Hill	Lotus-Ford	79	+ 1 Lap	22	1
7	2	(France) François Cevert	March-Ford	79	+ 1 Lap	14	
8	28	(Brazil) Emerson Fittipaldi	Lotus-Ford	78	+ 2 Laps	21	
9	27	(Sweden) Ronnie Peterson	March-Ford	72	+ 8 Laps	13	
NC	29	(United States) Pete Lovely	Lotus-Ford	69	+ 11 Laps	23	
Ret	10	(United States) Dan Gurney	McLaren-Ford	60	Oil Pressure	11	
Ret	22	(Mexico) Pedro Rodríguez	BRM	58	Accident	15	
Ret	23	(United Kingdom) Jackie Oliver	BRM	54	Engine	4	
Ret	1	(United Kingdom) Jackie Stewart	March-Ford	52	Clutch	8	
Ret	20	(United Kingdom) John Surtees	Surtees-Ford	51	Oil Pressure	19	
Ret	8	(France) Henri Pescarolo	Matra	41	Accident	12	
Ret	7	(France) Jean-Pierre Beltoise	Matra	24	Wheel	10	
Ret	26	(United States) Mario Andretti	March-Ford	21	Suspension	9	
Ret	15	(Switzerland) Jo Siffert	March-Ford	19	Suspension	20	
Ret	6	(United Kingdom) John Miles	Lotus-Ford	15	Engine	7	
Ret	24	(Canada) George Eaton	BRM	10	Oil Pressure	16	
Ret	3	(Belgium) Jacky Ickx	Ferrari	6	Transmission	3	
DNS	11	(Italy) Andrea de Adamich	McLaren-Alfa Romeo		Fuel Leak	18	
DNS	18	(Germany) Rolf Stommelen	Brabham-Ford				
DNS	25	(United Kingdom) Brian Redman	De Tomaso-Ford				

== Notes ==
- This was the Formula One World Championship debut for Brazilian driver and future World Champion Emerson Fittipaldi.
- This was the Formula One World Championship debut for British constructor Surtees.

== Championship standings after the race ==
Drivers' Championship standings

	Pos	Driver	Points
	1	(Austria) Jochen Rindt	36
1	2	(Australia) Jack Brabham	25
1	3	(United Kingdom) Jackie Stewart	19
1	4	(New Zealand) Denny Hulme	16
1	5	(New Zealand) Chris Amon	14

Constructors' Championship standings

Pos	Constructor	Points
1	(United Kingdom) Lotus-Ford	41
2	(United Kingdom) March-Ford	33
3	(United Kingdom) Brabham-Ford	27
4	(United Kingdom) McLaren-Ford	23
5	(France) Matra	15

- Note: Only the top five positions are included for both sets of standings.

Previous race: 1970 French Grand Prix	FIA Formula One World Championship; 1970 season	Next race: 1970 German Grand Prix
Previous race: 1969 British Grand Prix	British Grand Prix	Next race: 1971 British Grand Prix
