= 1971 Spanish Grand Prix =

- The Montjuïc Circuit (1966–1975)

Race details
- Date: April 18, 1971
- Official name: XVII Gran Premio de España
- Location: Montjuïc Circuit, Montjuïc, Barcelona, Catalonia, Spain
- Course: Street Circuit
- Course length: 3.791 km (2.356 miles)
- Distance: 75 laps, 284.325 km (176.671 miles)
- Weather: Sunny, Hot, Dry

Pole position
Driver	(Belgium) Jacky Ickx	Ferrari
- Time: 1:25.9

Fastest lap
Driver	(Belgium) Jacky Ickx	Ferrari
- Time: 1:25.1 on lap 69

Podium
First	(United Kingdom) Jackie Stewart	Tyrrell-Ford
Second	(Belgium) Jacky Ickx	Ferrari
Third	(New Zealand) Chris Amon	Matra

The 1971 Spanish Grand Prix was a Formula One motor race held at the Montjuïc Circuit on April 18, 1971. It was race 2 of 11 in both the 1971 World Championship of Drivers and the 1971 International Cup for Formula One Manufacturers. The 75-lap race was won by Tyrrell driver Jackie Stewart after he started from fourth position. Jacky Ickx finished second for the Ferrari team and Matra driver Chris Amon came in third.

This was notably the first Formula One race in which slick tyres were used. The tyres were introduced by Firestone, based on its experience in American open wheel racing series. The race itself was held in the morning.

== Classification ==
=== Qualifying ===
Pos	No	Driver	Constructor	Time	Gap
1	4	(Belgium) Jacky Ickx	Ferrari	1:25.9	—
2	5	(Switzerland) Clay Regazzoni	Ferrari	1:26.0	+0.1
3	20	(New Zealand) Chris Amon	Matra	1:26.0	+0.1
4	11	(United Kingdom) Jackie Stewart	Tyrrell-Ford	1:26.2	+0.3
5	14	(Mexico) Pedro Rodríguez	BRM	1:26.5	+0.6
6	21	(France) Jean-Pierre Beltoise	Matra	1:26.6	+0.7
7	10	(United Kingdom) Peter Gethin	McLaren-Ford	1:26.8	+0.9
8	6	(United States) Mario Andretti	Ferrari	1:26.9	+1.0
9	9	(New Zealand) Denny Hulme	McLaren-Ford	1:27.1	+1.2
10	15	(Switzerland) Jo Siffert	BRM	1:27.3	+1.4
11	27	(France) Henri Pescarolo	March-Ford	1:27.5	+1.6
12	12	(France) François Cevert	Tyrrell-Ford	1:27.7	+1.8
13	18	(Sweden) Ronnie Peterson	March-Ford	1:27.8	+1.9
14	2	(Brazil) Emerson Fittipaldi	Lotus-Ford	1:27.9	+2.0
15	7	(United Kingdom) Graham Hill	Brabham-Ford	1:28.4	+2.5
16	3	(Sweden) Reine Wisell	Lotus-Ford	1:28.6	+2.7
17	16	(New Zealand) Howden Ganley	BRM	1:28.6	+2.7
18	17	(Italy) Andrea de Adamich	March-Alfa Romeo	1:29.5	+3.6
19	25	(West Germany) Rolf Stommelen	Surtees-Ford	1:29.6	+3.7
20	19	(Spain) Alex Soler-Roig	March-Ford	1:29.8	+3.9
21	8	(Australia) Tim Schenken	Brabham-Ford	1:30.6	+4.7
22	24	(United Kingdom) John Surtees	Surtees-Ford	1:30.8	+4.9

=== Race ===
Pos	No	Driver	Constructor	Laps	Time/Retired	Grid	Points
1	11	(United Kingdom) Jackie Stewart	Tyrrell-Ford	75	1:49:03.4	4	9
2	4	(Belgium) Jacky Ickx	Ferrari	75	+ 3.4	1	6
3	20	(New Zealand) Chris Amon	Matra	75	+ 58.1	3	4
4	14	(Mexico) Pedro Rodríguez	BRM	75	+ 1:17.9	5	3
5	9	(New Zealand) Denny Hulme	McLaren-Ford	75	+ 1:27.0	9	2
6	21	(France) Jean-Pierre Beltoise	Matra	74	+ 1 lap	6	1
7	12	(France) François Cevert	Tyrrell-Ford	74	+ 1 lap	12	
8	10	(United Kingdom) Peter Gethin	McLaren-Ford	73	+ 2 laps	7	
9	8	(Australia) Tim Schenken	Brabham-Ford	72	+ 3 laps	21	
10	16	(New Zealand) Howden Ganley	BRM	71	+ 4 laps	17	
11	24	(United Kingdom) John Surtees	Surtees-Ford	67	+ 8 laps	22	
NC	3	(Sweden) Reine Wisell	Lotus-Ford	58	+ 17 laps	16	
Ret	2	(Brazil) Emerson Fittipaldi	Lotus-Ford	54	Suspension	14	
Ret	27	(France) Henri Pescarolo	March-Ford	53	Engine	11	
Ret	6	(United States) Mario Andretti	Ferrari	50	Engine	8	
Ret	19	(Spain) Alex Soler-Roig	March-Ford	46	Fuel pump	20	
Ret	17	(Italy) Andrea de Adamich	March-Alfa Romeo	26	Transmission	18	
Ret	18	(Sweden) Ronnie Peterson	March-Ford	24	Ignition	13	
Ret	5	(Switzerland) Clay Regazzoni	Ferrari	13	Engine	2	
Ret	25	(West Germany) Rolf Stommelen	Surtees-Ford	9	Fuel pressure	19	
Ret	15	(Switzerland) Jo Siffert	BRM	5	Gearbox	15	
Ret	7	(United Kingdom) Graham Hill	Brabham-Ford	5	Steering	10	

== Notes ==
- This was Ferrari's 54th pole position, setting a new record and breaking the old record set by Lotus at the 1970 Austrian Grand Prix.

== Championship standings after the race ==
Drivers' Championship standings

	Pos	Driver	Points
1	1	(United Kingdom) Jackie Stewart	15
1	2	(United States) Mario Andretti	9
5	3	(Belgium) Jacky Ickx	6
1	4	(New Zealand) Chris Amon	6
2	5	(Switzerland) Clay Regazzoni	4

Constructors' Championship standings

	Pos	Constructor	Points
	1	(Italy) Ferrari	15
	2	(United Kingdom) Tyrrell-Ford	15
1	3	(France) Matra	6
1	4	(United Kingdom) Lotus-Ford	3
5	5	(United Kingdom) BRM	3

- Note: Only the top five positions are included for both sets of standings.

Previous race: 1971 South African Grand Prix	FIA Formula One World Championship; 1971 season	Next race: 1971 Monaco Grand Prix
Previous race: 1970 Spanish Grand Prix	Spanish Grand Prix	Next race: 1972 Spanish Grand Prix
