= 1971 German Grand Prix =

Race details
- Date: 1 August 1971
- Official name: XXXIII Großer Preis von Deutschland
- Location: Nürburgring, Nürburg, West Germany
- Course: Permanent racing facility
- Course length: 22.835 km (14.189 miles)
- Distance: 12 laps, 274.02 km (170.268 miles)

Pole position
Driver	(United Kingdom) Jackie Stewart	Tyrrell-Ford
- Time: 7:19.0

Fastest lap
Driver	(France) François Cevert	Tyrrell-Ford
- Time: 7:20.1

Podium
First	(United Kingdom) Jackie Stewart	Tyrrell-Ford
Second	(France) François Cevert	Tyrrell-Ford
Third	(Switzerland) Clay Regazzoni	Ferrari

The 1971 German Grand Prix was a Formula One motor race held at Nürburgring on 1 August 1971. It was race 7 of 11 in both the 1971 World Championship of Drivers and the 1971 International Cup for Formula One Manufacturers.

The race returned to the Nürburgring after a year at the Hockenheimring after the safety was improved on the track. The race distance was shortened to 12 laps. Notable driver changes included Vic Elford replacing Pedro Rodríguez, who had been killed in a sports car race at Norisring the previous month. Jackie Stewart took pole and dominated the race, while François Cevert finished second, making it a Tyrrell 1–2. Cevert battled with and was stuck behind Clay Regazzoni for more than a quarter of the race; the Swiss driver finished 3rd. Mario Andretti, Ronnie Peterson and Tim Schenken rounded out the points. Mike Beuttler was disqualified on the third lap after entering the pits via the "short chute", after suffering a flat tire just after passing the pits, and not wanting to drive 14 miles on a flat tire. Jo Siffert was also disqualified on lap seven for taking the short chute into the pits, after his right-hand lower front wishbone started detaching from the chassis and his ignition coil started acting up. With a lap distance of 12 laps the race formerly held the record for the fewest number of laps (official) in a Grand Prix until the 2021 Belgian Grand Prix which was classified after 1 lap after being red flagged.

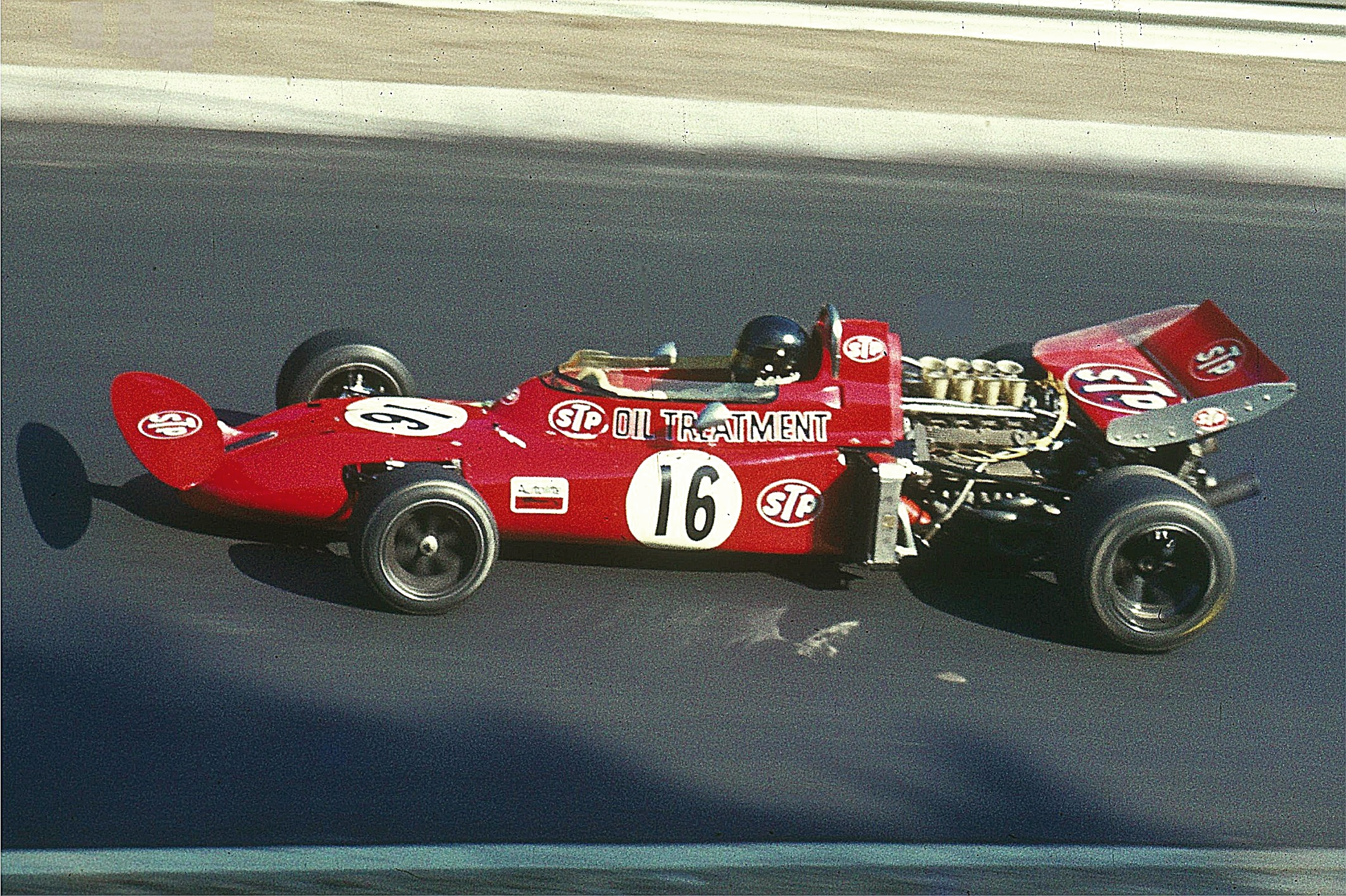
Andrea de Adamich in a March 711

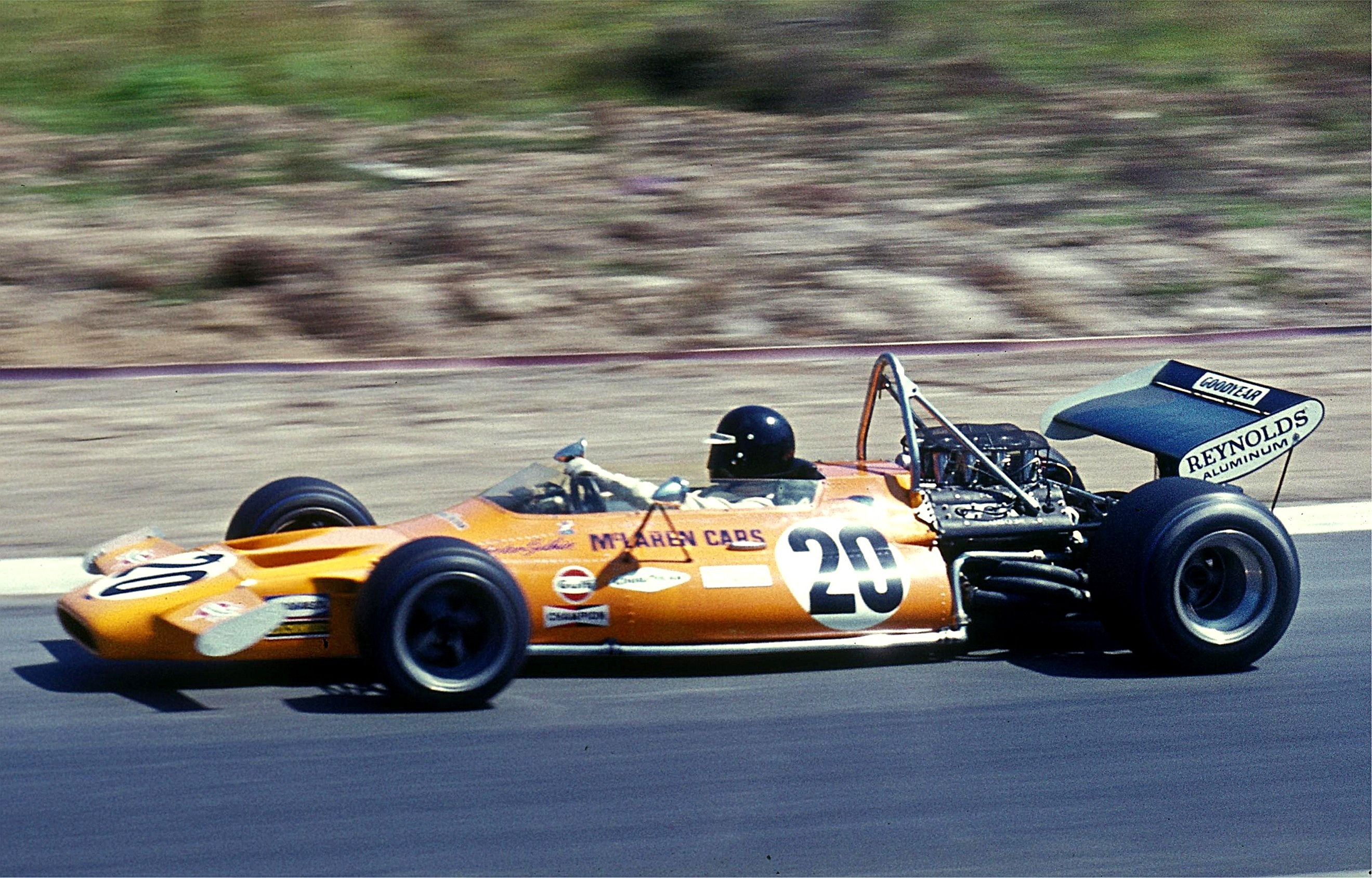
Peter Gethin in a McLaren M19A

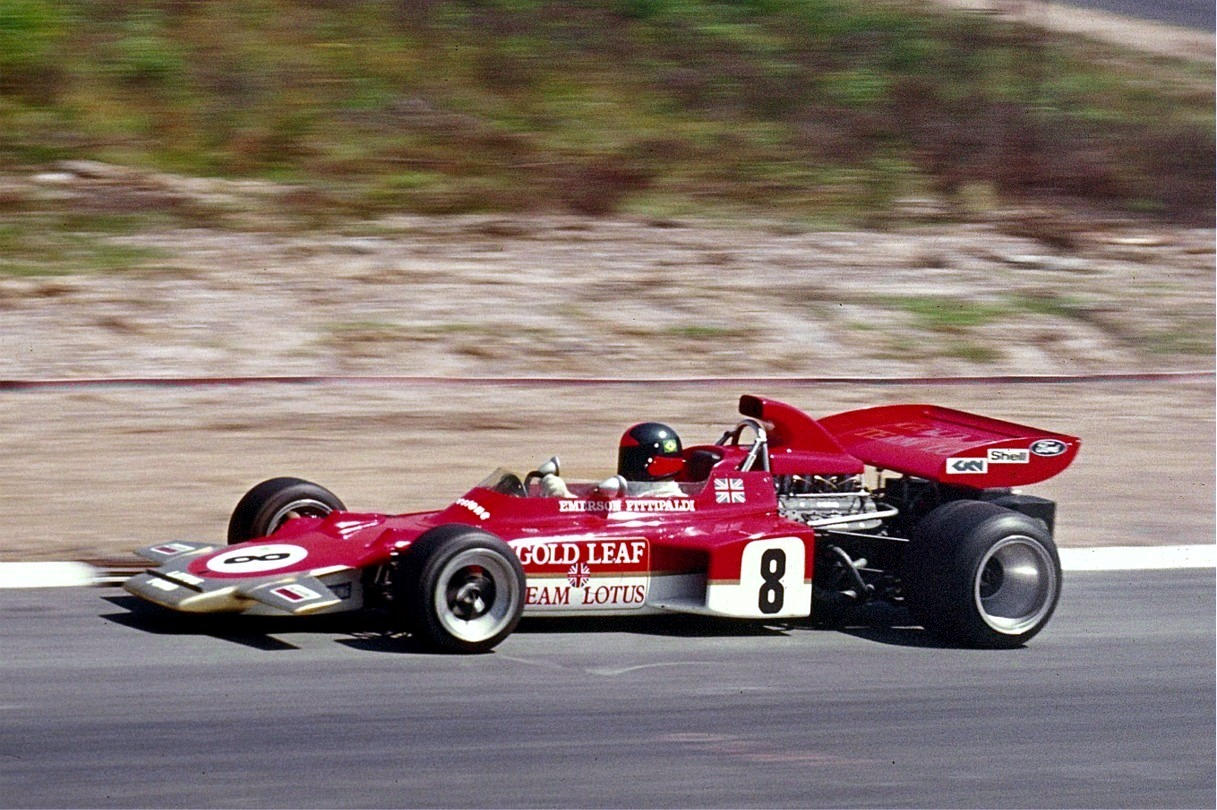
Emerson Fittipaldi in a Lotus 72

== Classification ==
=== Qualifying ===
Pos	No	Driver	Constructor	Time	Gap
1	2	(United Kingdom) Jackie Stewart	Tyrrell-Ford	7:19.0	—
2	4	(Belgium) Jacky Ickx	Ferrari	7:19.2	+0.2
3	21	(Switzerland) Jo Siffert	BRM	7:22.4	+3.4
4	6	(Switzerland) Clay Regazzoni	Ferrari	7:22.7	+3.7
5	3	(France) François Cevert	Tyrrell-Ford	7:23.4	+4.4
6	18	(New Zealand) Denny Hulme	McLaren-Ford	7:26.0	+7.0
7	15	(Sweden) Ronnie Peterson	March-Ford	7:26.5	+7.5
8	8	(Brazil) Emerson Fittipaldi	Lotus-Ford	7:27.5	+8.5
9	25	(Australia) Tim Schenken	Brabham-Ford	7:29.8	+10.8
10	14	(France) Henri Pescarolo	March-Ford	7:30.3	+11.3
11	5	(United States) Mario Andretti	Ferrari	7:31.7	+12.7
12	12	(West Germany) Rolf Stommelen	Surtees-Ford	7:34.7	+15.7
13	24	(United Kingdom) Graham Hill	Brabham-Ford	7:36.1	+17.1
14	23	(New Zealand) Howden Ganley	BRM	7:36.6	+17.6
15	7	(United Kingdom) John Surtees	Surtees-Ford	7:36.7	+17.7
16	10	(New Zealand) Chris Amon	Matra	7:37.3	+18.3
17	9	(Sweden) Reine Wisell	Lotus-Ford	7:39.96	+20.96
18	22	(United Kingdom) Vic Elford	BRM	7:39.98	+20.98
19	20	(United Kingdom) Peter Gethin	McLaren-Ford	7:41.4	+22.4
20	16	(Italy) Andrea de Adamich	March-Alfa Romeo	7:41.7	+22.7
21	17	(Italy) Nanni Galli	March-Alfa Romeo	7:47.5	+28.5
22	28	(United Kingdom) Mike Beuttler	March-Ford	7:42.6	+31.6
DNQ	27	(Sweden) Jo Bonnier	McLaren-Ford	8:17.0	+58.0
DNQ	27	(Austria) Helmut Marko	McLaren-Ford	No time	—

=== Race ===
Pos	No	Driver	Constructor	Laps	Time/Retired	Grid	Points
1	2	(United Kingdom) Jackie Stewart	Tyrrell-Ford	12	1:29:16.3	1	9
2	3	(France) François Cevert	Tyrrell-Ford	12	+ 30.1	5	6
3	6	(Switzerland) Clay Regazzoni	Ferrari	12	+ 37.1	4	4
4	5	(United States) Mario Andretti	Ferrari	12	+ 2:05.0	11	3
5	15	(Sweden) Ronnie Peterson	March-Ford	12	+ 2:29.1	7	2
6	25	(Australia) Tim Schenken	Brabham-Ford	12	+ 2:58.6	9	1
7	7	(United Kingdom) John Surtees	Surtees-Ford	12	+ 3:19.0	15	
8	9	(Sweden) Reine Wisell	Lotus-Ford	12	+ 6:31.7	17	
9	24	(United Kingdom) Graham Hill	Brabham-Ford	12	+ 6:37.0	13	
10	12	(West Germany) Rolf Stommelen	Surtees-Ford	11	+ 1 Lap	12	
11	22	(United Kingdom) Vic Elford	BRM	11	+ 1 Lap	18	
12	17	(Italy) Nanni Galli	March-Alfa Romeo	10	+ 2 Laps	21	
Ret	8	(Brazil) Emerson Fittipaldi	Lotus-Ford	8	Oil Leak	8	
DSQ	21	(Switzerland) Jo Siffert	BRM	6	Illegal Pit Stop	3	
Ret	10	(New Zealand) Chris Amon	Matra	6	Accident	16	
Ret	14	(France) Henri Pescarolo	March-Ford	5	Suspension	10	
Ret	20	(United Kingdom) Peter Gethin	McLaren-Ford	5	Accident	19	
Ret	18	(New Zealand) Denny Hulme	McLaren-Ford	3	Fuel Leak	6	
DSQ	28	(United Kingdom) Mike Beuttler	March-Ford	3	Illegal Pit Stop	22	
Ret	23	(New Zealand) Howden Ganley	BRM	2	Engine	14	
Ret	16	(Italy) Andrea de Adamich	March-Alfa Romeo	2	Injection	20	
Ret	4	(Belgium) Jacky Ickx	Ferrari	1	Accident	2	
DNQ	27	(Sweden) Jo Bonnier	McLaren-Ford				
WD	27	(Austria) Helmut Marko	McLaren-Ford		Driven by Bonnier		

== Notes ==
- This was the Formula One World Championship debut for that year's Le Mans winner and Austrian driver Helmut Marko.
- This was the 10th Grand Prix start for British constructor Tyrrell. It was also their 5th pole position and 5th Grand Prix win.

== Championship standings after the race ==
Drivers' Championship standings

	Pos	Driver	Points
	1	(United Kingdom) **Jackie Stewart***	51
	2	(Belgium) **Jacky Ickx***	19
	3	(Sweden) **Ronnie Peterson***	17
1	4	(United States) Mario Andretti	12
2	5	(Switzerland) Clay Regazzoni	12

Constructors' Championship standings

Pos	Constructor	Points
1	(United Kingdom) **Tyrrell-Ford***	51
2	(Italy) **Ferrari***	32
3	(United Kingdom) **March-Ford***	17
4	(United Kingdom) Lotus-Ford	13
5	(United Kingdom) BRM	12

- Note: Only the top five positions are included for both sets of standings.
- Competitors in bold and marked with an asterisk still had a theoretical chance of becoming World Champion.

Previous race: 1971 British Grand Prix	FIA Formula One World Championship; 1971 season	Next race: 1971 Austrian Grand Prix
Previous race: 1970 German Grand Prix	German Grand Prix	Next race: 1972 German Grand Prix
