= 1971 Austrian Grand Prix =

- The Österreichring (in 1971)

Race details
- Date: 15 August 1971
- Official name: IX Großer Preis von Österreich
- Location: Österreichring, Spielberg, Styria, Austria
- Course: Permanent racing facility
- Course length: 5.911 km (3.673 miles)
- Distance: 54 laps, 317.347 km (198.686 miles)
- Weather: Dry

Pole position
| Driver | (Switzerland) Jo Siffert | BRM |
- Time: 1:37.44

Fastest lap
| Driver | (Switzerland) Jo Siffert | BRM |
- Time: 1:38.47

Podium
| First | (Switzerland) Jo Siffert | BRM |
| Second | (Brazil) Emerson Fittipaldi | Lotus-Ford |
| Third | (Australia) Tim Schenken | Brabham-Ford |

The 1971 Austrian Grand Prix was a Formula One motor race held at Österreichring on 15 August 1971. It was race 8 of 11 in both the 1971 World Championship of Drivers and the 1971 International Cup for Formula One Manufacturers. The 54-lap race was won by BRM driver Jo Siffert after he started from pole position. Emerson Fittipaldi finished second for the Lotus team and Brabham driver Tim Schenken came in third, which turned out to be the first and only podium finish in his Formula One career. This was the debut race of the future world champion Niki Lauda. It was Siffert's last pole position and victory before he died during a non-championship race at Brands Hatch.

As Jacky Ickx retired on lap 32 with an engine failure and Ronnie Peterson could only muster an 8th place finish, Jackie Stewart was consequently crowned World Champion for the second time in his career, despite retiring with a halfshaft issue four laps later. Stewart maintained a 32-point-lead over second-placed Ickx with three rounds to go, which was enough to retain his crown after two years.

== Race report ==
Jo Siffert in a BRM P160 took a surprise pole position from Jackie Stewart and led away at the start from Clay Regazzoni and Jacky Ickx. The front two drew away from the pack, where Regazzoni was duelling with François Cevert and Ickx was dropping back with mechanical problems. On lap 21, Stewart with a poorly handling car allowed Cevert through so he could chase Siffert. Further down the field, there were two Brabham-Lotus battles, with Tim Schenken duelling with Emerson Fittipaldi and Reine Wisell trading places with Graham Hill. By lap 32, Ickx had retired with a spark plug problem, Regazzoni had an engine blow up and Fittipaldi had passed Schenken and set about catching Stewart.

On lap 36, Stewart's race ended with a violent accident - his left rear driveshaft broke and the wheel was torn off. He emerged unhurt to be greeted as World Champion following Ickx's retirement. Cevert was chasing down Siffert, but with 12 laps to go his gearbox exploded.

Fittipaldi was now carving chunks out the BRM's lead, due to a left-rear puncture for the Swiss. However he managed to nurse the ailing car home for a popular victory by 4 seconds. Schenken was 3rd, with Wisell pipping Hill for 4th place - the Englishman was another to suffer a puncture in the dying stages and Henri Pescarolo finished 6th in his March. Stewart won the Drivers' Championship with 3 races left to go.

== Classification ==
=== Qualifying ===
| Pos | No | Driver | Constructor | Time | Gap |
|---|---|---|---|---|---|
| 1 | 14 | (Switzerland) Jo Siffert | BRM | 1:37.44 | — |
| 2 | 11 | (United Kingdom) Jackie Stewart | Tyrrell-Ford | 1:37.65 | +0.21 |
| 3 | 12 | (France) François Cevert | Tyrrell-Ford | 1:37.86 | +0.42 |
| 4 | 5 | (Switzerland) Clay Regazzoni | Ferrari | 1:37.90 | +0.46 |
| 5 | 2 | (Brazil) Emerson Fittipaldi | Lotus-Ford | 1:37.90 | +0.46 |
| 6 | 4 | (Belgium) Jacky Ickx | Ferrari | 1:38.27 | +0.83 |
| 7 | 8 | (Australia) Tim Schenken | Brabham-Ford | 1:38.64 | +1.20 |
| 8 | 7 | (United Kingdom) Graham Hill | Brabham-Ford | 1:38.70 | +1.26 |
| 9 | 9 | (New Zealand) Denny Hulme | McLaren-Ford | 1:38.80 | +1.36 |
| 10 | 3 | (Sweden) Reine Wisell | Lotus-Ford | 1:38.95 | +1.51 |
| 11 | 17 | (Sweden) Ronnie Peterson | March-Ford | 1:39.01 | +1.57 |
| 12 | 24 | (Germany) Rolf Stommelen | Surtees-Ford | 1:39.08 | +1.64 |
| 13 | 25 | (France) Henri Pescarolo | March-Ford | 1:39.09 | +1.65 |
| 14 | 15 | (New Zealand) Howden Ganley | BRM | 1:39.46 | +2.02 |
| 15 | 19 | (Italy) Nanni Galli | March-Alfa Romeo | 1:39.54 | +2.10 |
| 16 | 23 | (United Kingdom) Peter Gethin | BRM | 1:39.67 | +2.23 |
| 17 | 16 | (Austria) Helmut Marko | BRM | 1:39.80 | +2.36 |
| 18 | 22 | (United Kingdom) John Surtees | Surtees-Ford | 1:40.37 | +2.93 |
| 19 | 27 | (United Kingdom) Mike Beuttler | March-Ford | 1:41.46 | +4.02 |
| 20 | 28 | (Sweden) Jo Bonnier | McLaren-Ford | 1:41.66 | +4.22 |
| 21 | 26 | (Austria) Niki Lauda | March-Ford | 1:43.68 | +6.24 |
| 22 | 10 | (United Kingdom) Jackie Oliver | McLaren-Ford | 1:44.22 | +6.78 |

=== Race ===
| Pos | No | Driver | Constructor | Laps | Time/Retired | Grid | Points |
|---|---|---|---|---|---|---|---|
| 1 | 14 | (Switzerland) Jo Siffert | BRM | 54 | 1:30:23.91 | 1 | 9 |
| 2 | 2 | (Brazil) Emerson Fittipaldi | Lotus-Ford | 54 | + 4.12 | 5 | 6 |
| 3 | 8 | (Australia) Tim Schenken | Brabham-Ford | 54 | + 19.77 | 7 | 4 |
| 4 | 3 | (Sweden) Reine Wisell | Lotus-Ford | 54 | + 31.87 | 10 | 3 |
| 5 | 7 | (United Kingdom) Graham Hill | Brabham-Ford | 54 | + 48.43 | 8 | 2 |
| 6 | 25 | (France) Henri Pescarolo | March-Ford | 54 | + 1:24.51 | 13 | 1 |
| 7 | 24 | (Germany) Rolf Stommelen | Surtees-Ford | 54 | + 1:37.42 | 12 | |
| 8 | 17 | (Sweden) Ronnie Peterson | March-Ford | 53 | + 1 lap | 11 | |
| 9 | 10 | (United Kingdom) Jackie Oliver | McLaren-Ford | 53 | + 1 lap | 22 | |
| 10 | 23 | (United Kingdom) Peter Gethin | BRM | 52 | + 2 laps | 16 | |
| 11 | 16 | (Austria) Helmut Marko | BRM | 52 | + 2 laps | 17 | |
| 12 | 19 | (Italy) Nanni Galli | March-Alfa Romeo | 51 | + 3 laps | 15 | |
| NC | 27 | (United Kingdom) Mike Beuttler | March-Ford | 47 | + 7 laps | 19 | |
| Ret | 12 | (France) François Cevert | Tyrrell-Ford | 42 | Engine | 3 | |
| Ret | 11 | (United Kingdom) Jackie Stewart | Tyrrell-Ford | 35 | Halfshaft | 2 | |
| Ret | 4 | (Belgium) Jacky Ickx | Ferrari | 31 | Engine | 6 | |
| Ret | 26 | (Austria) Niki Lauda | March-Ford | 20 | Handling | 21 | |
| Ret | 22 | (United Kingdom) John Surtees | Surtees-Ford | 12 | Engine | 18 | |
| Ret | 5 | (Switzerland) Clay Regazzoni | Ferrari | 8 | Engine | 4 | |
| Ret | 15 | (New Zealand) Howden Ganley | BRM | 5 | Ignition | 14 | |
| Ret | 9 | (New Zealand) Denny Hulme | McLaren-Ford | 4 | Engine | 9 | |
| DNS | 28 | (Sweden) Jo Bonnier | McLaren-Ford | 0 | Fuel leak | 20 | |

== Notes ==
- This was the Formula One World Championship debut for future World Champion and Austrian driver Niki Lauda.
- This race saw the first Grand Slam for a Swiss driver.
- This was the 10th pole position for a BRM and for a BRM-powered car.

== Championship standings after the race ==
Drivers' Championship standings

| | Pos | Driver | Points |
|---|---|---|---|
| | 1 | (United Kingdom) **Jackie Stewart** | 51 |
| | 2 | (Belgium) Jacky Ickx | 19 |
| | 3 | (Sweden) Ronnie Peterson | 17 |
| 3 | 4 | (Brazil) Emerson Fittipaldi | 16 |
| 7 | 5 | (Switzerland) Jo Siffert | 13 |

Constructors' Championship standings

| | Pos | Constructor | Points |
|---|---|---|---|
| | 1 | (United Kingdom) **Tyrrell-Ford*** | 51 |
| | 2 | (Italy) **Ferrari*** | 32 |
| 2 | 3 | (United Kingdom) BRM | 21 |
| | 4 | (United Kingdom) Lotus-Ford | 19 |
| 2 | 5 | (United Kingdom) March-Ford | 18 |

- Note: Only the top five positions are included for both sets of standings.
- Bold text indicates the 1971 World Drivers' Champion.
- Competitors in bold and marked with an asterisk still had a theoretical chance of becoming World Champion.

| Previous race: 1971 German Grand Prix | FIA Formula One World Championship; 1971 season | Next race: 1971 Italian Grand Prix |
| Previous race: 1970 Austrian Grand Prix | Austrian Grand Prix | Next race: 1972 Austrian Grand Prix |
