= William Ferguson (racing driver) =

South African racing driver (1940–2007)

William "Willie" Ferguson
- Born: 6 March 1940; Johannesburg, South Africa
- Died: 19 May 2007 (aged 67); Durban, South Africa

Formula One World Championship career
- Nationality: (South Africa) South African
- Active years: 1972
- Team: non-works Brabham
- Entries: 1 (0 starts)
- Championships: 0
- Wins: 0
- Podiums: 0
- Career points: 0
- Pole positions: 0
- Fastest laps: 0
- First entry: 1972 South African Grand Prix

William "Willie" Ferguson (6 March 1940, Johannesburg – 19 May 2007, Durban) was a racing driver from South Africa. He entered the 1972 South African Grand Prix with local outfit Team Gunston, running a Brabham BT33, but could not start the race due to a blown engine in practice. He was also pencilled in to drive a Surtees TS9 for the same team, but that car was eventually raced by John Love. Ferguson participated in numerous non-Championship Formula One races.

== Complete Formula One World Championship results ==
(key)

Year	Entrant	Chassis	Engine	1	2	3	4	5	6	7	8	9	10	11	12	WDC	Points
1972	Team Gunston	Brabham BT33	Cosworth V8	ARG	RSA; DNS	ESP	MON	BEL	FRA	GBR	GER	AUT	ITA	CAN	USA	NC	0
