= Nanni Galli =

Italian racing driver (1940–2019)

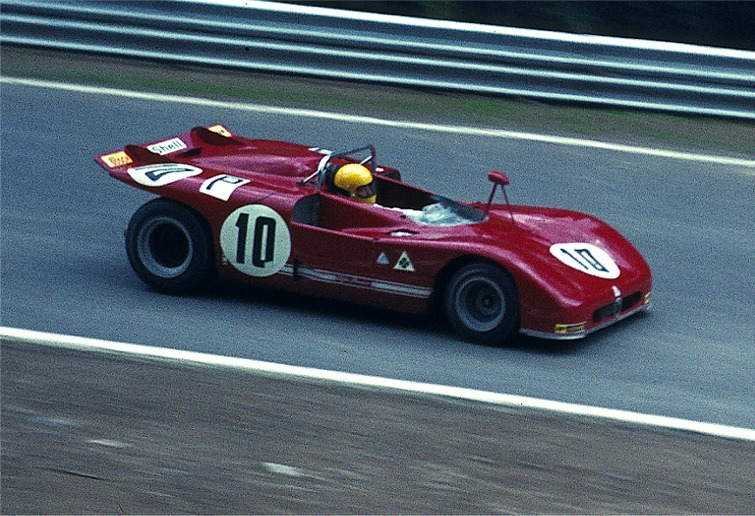
- Galli driving Alfa Romeo 33.3 at the Nürburgring in 1971
- Born: 2 October 1940; Bologna, Italy
- Died: 12 October 2019 (aged 79); Prato, Italy

Formula One World Championship career
- Nationality: (Italy) Italian
- Active years: 1970 – 1973
- Team(s): McLaren, March, Tecno, Ferrari, Williams
- Entries: 20 (17 starts)
- Championships: 0
- Wins: 0
- Podiums: 0
- Career points: 0
- Pole positions: 0
- Fastest laps: 0
- First entry: 1970 Italian Grand Prix
- Last entry: 1973 Monaco Grand Prix

Giovanni Giuseppe Gilberto "Nanni" Galli (2 October 1940 – 12 October 2019) was an Italian saloon, sports-car and Formula One driver of the 1960s and 1970s.

== Career ==
Born in Bologna, Galli started his career in endurance racing. He won the Circuit of Mugello race in 1968 and finished second in the Targa Florio (with Ignazio Giunti) the same year. In the 1968 24 Hours of Le Mans, Galli and Giunti finished fourth in an Alfa Romeo T33/2. The following year at Le Mans, he shared a drive with Robin Widdows, and they finished seventh in a Matra. Galli's final appearance at Le Mans was in 1970, where he shared an Alfa Romeo T33/3 with Rolf Stommelen. They did not finish.

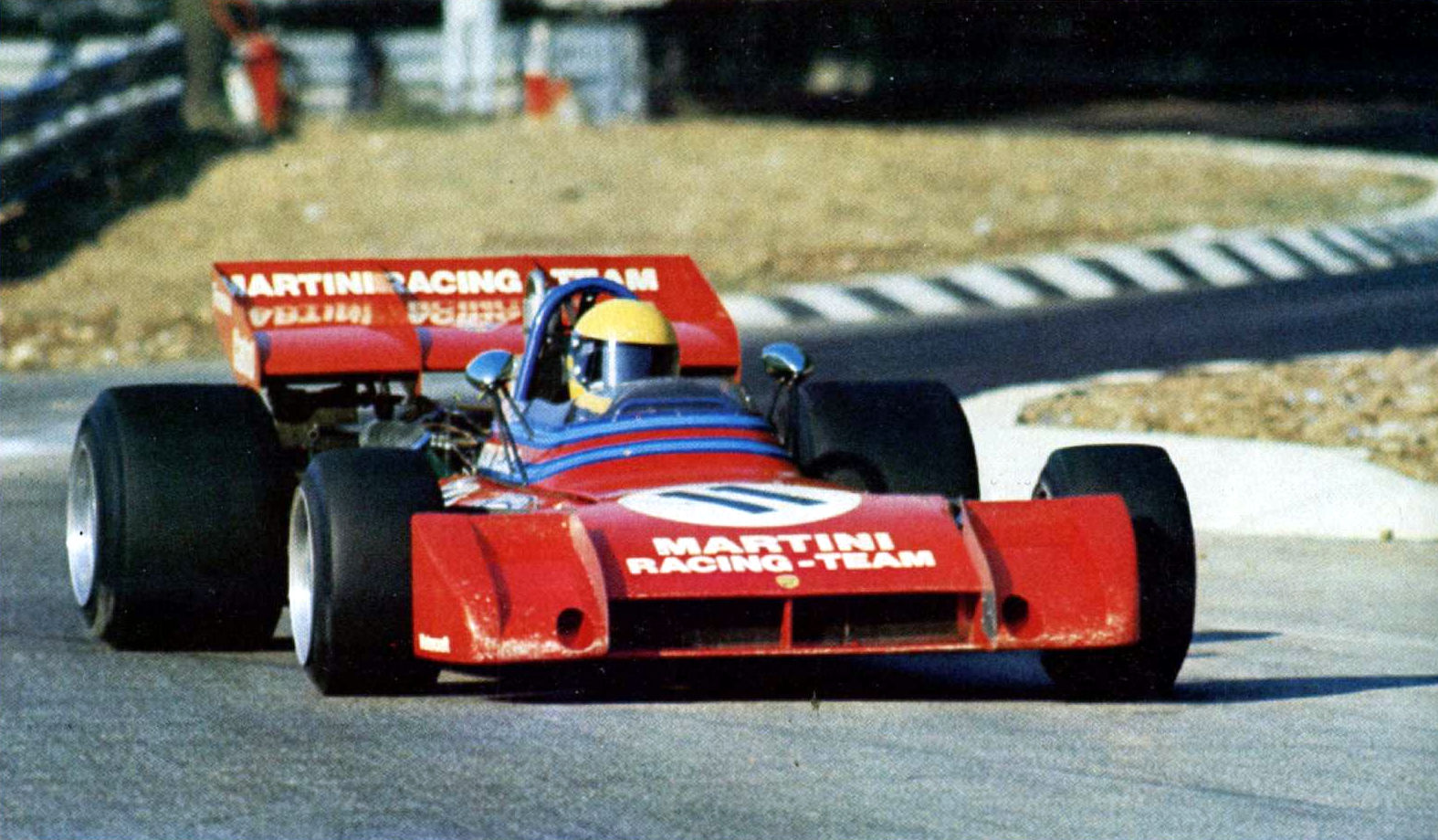
Galli driving for Tecno at the 1972 Italian Grand Prix

Galli moved briefly into Formula One in 1970, debuting in the 1970 Italian Grand Prix with a McLaren-Alfa, and had a handful of drives over the next couple of years, finishing third in the non-championship Grand Prix of the Italian Republic at Vallelunga in 1972 for the small Tecno team.

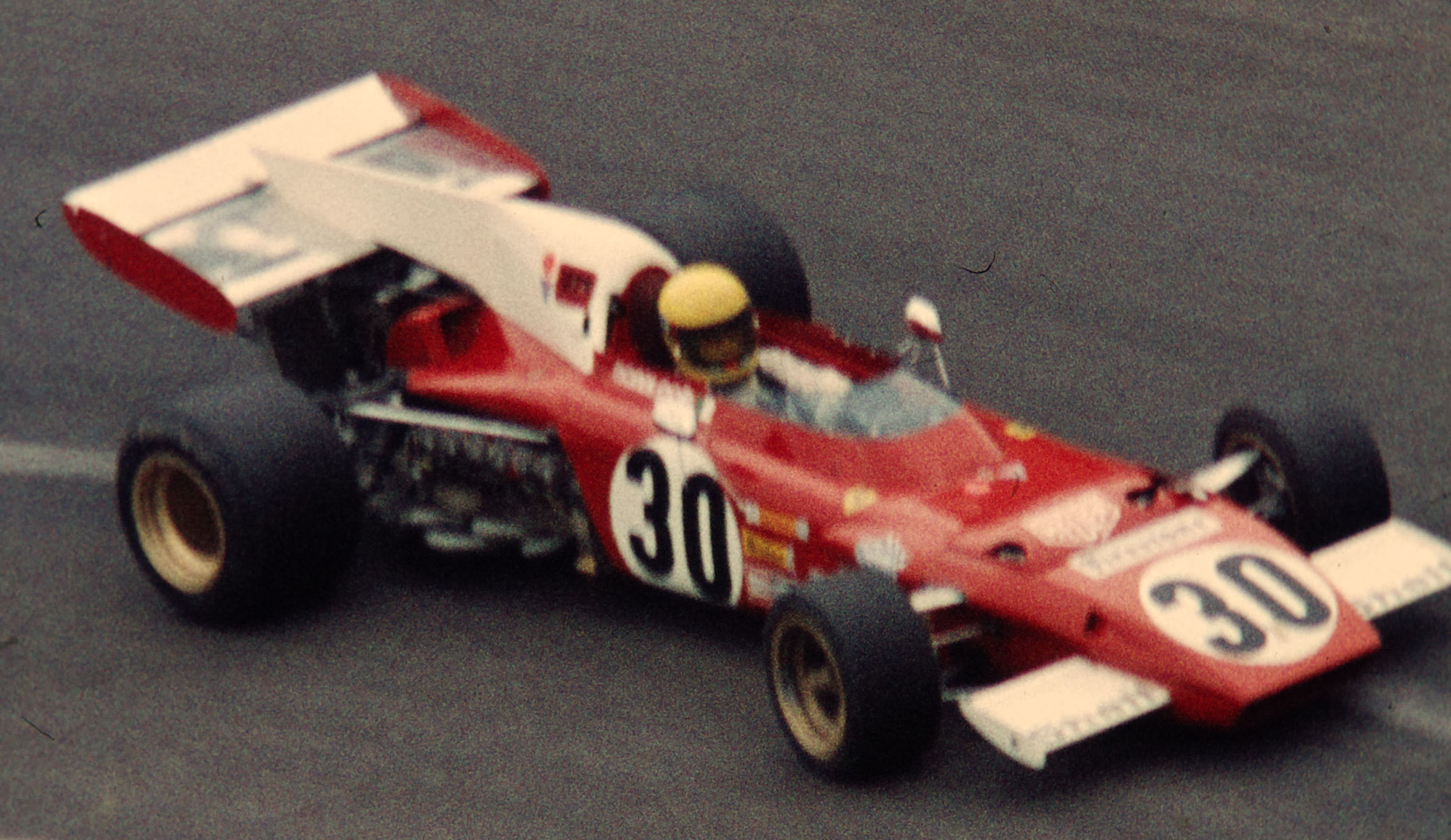
Galli driving for Ferrari at the 1972 French Grand Prix at Clermont-Ferrand

Galli's one shot at the big time came that year when he drove for Ferrari in the 1972 French Grand Prix at Circuit Charade near Clermont-Ferrand. Galli qualified 20th and finished only 13th. After half a dozen outings in an uncompetitive car for Frank Williams the following year, Galli announced his retirement.

Galli participated in 20 World Championship Grands Prix in total, scoring no championship points.

In 2014, Galli participated in the Le Mans Classic in a Lola T290, finishing 21st. He had not entered a race since he drove in the 1974 World Endurance Championship with an Osella-Abarth.

Galli died on 12 October 2019 in Prato at the age of 79.

== Racing record ==
=== Complete British Saloon Car Championship results ===
(key) (Races in bold indicate pole position; races in italics indicate fastest lap.)

Year	Team	Car	Class	1	2	3	4	5	6	7	8	9	10	11	12	DC	Pts	Class
1967	Autodelta S.p.A.	Alfa Romeo 1600 GTA	C	BRH	SNE; Ret	SIL	SIL	MAL	SIL	SIL	BRH	OUL	BRH			NC	0	NC
1970	Autodelta S.p.A.	Alfa Romeo 2000 GTAm	C	BRH	SNE	THR	SIL	CRY	SIL	SIL; 4	CRO	BRH	OUL	BRH	BRH	24th	12	8th

=== Complete 24 Hours of Le Mans results ===
Year	Team	Co-Drivers	Car	Class	Laps	Pos.	Class Pos.
1968	(Italy) Autodelta SpA	(Italy) Ignazio Giunti	Alfa Romeo T33/2	P 2.0	322	4th	**1st**
1969	(France) Equipe Matra – Elf	(United Kingdom) Robin Widdows	Matra-Simca MS630/650	P 3.0	330	7th	4th
1970	(Italy) Autodelta SpA	(Germany) Rolf Stommelen	Alfa Romeo T33/3	P 3.0	220	DSQ	DSQ

=== Complete Formula One World Championship results ===
(key)

Year	Entrant	Chassis	Engine	1	2	3	4	5	6	7	8	9	10	11	12	13	14	15	WDC	Points
1970	Bruce McLaren Motor Racing	McLaren M7D	Alfa Romeo V8	RSA	ESP	MON	BEL	NED	FRA	GBR	GER	AUT	ITA; DNQ	CAN	USA	MEX			NC	0
1971	STP March	March 711	Alfa Romeo V8	RSA	ESP	MON; DNQ	NED; Ret			GER; 12	AUT; 12								NC	0
1971	STP March	March 711	Cosworth V8					FRA; DNS	GBR; 11			ITA; Ret	CAN; 16	USA; Ret					NC	0
1972	Martini Racing Team	Tecno PA123	Tecno Flat-12	ARG	RSA	ESP	MON	BEL; Ret		GBR; Ret	GER	AUT; NC	ITA; Ret	CAN	USA				NC	0
1972	Scuderia Ferrari	Ferrari 312B	Ferrari Flat-12						FRA; 13										NC	0
1973	Frank Williams Racing Cars	Iso-Marlboro FX3B	Cosworth V8	ARG; Ret	BRA; 9	RSA													NC	0
1973	Frank Williams Racing Cars	Iso-Marlboro IR	Cosworth V8				ESP; 11	BEL; Ret	MON; Ret	SWE	FRA	GBR	NED	GER	AUT	ITA	CAN	USA	NC	0

=== Complete Formula One Non-Championship results ===
(key) (Races in bold indicate pole position; races in italics indicate fastest lap.)

Year	Entrant	Chassis	Engine	Tyres	1	2	3	4	5	6
1972	Martini Racing Team	Tecno PA123	Tecno Series P F12	F	ROC	BRA	INT	OUL	REP; 3	VIC

== Sources ==
- Profile at www.grandprix.com
