= Rolf Stommelen =

German racing driver (1943–1983)

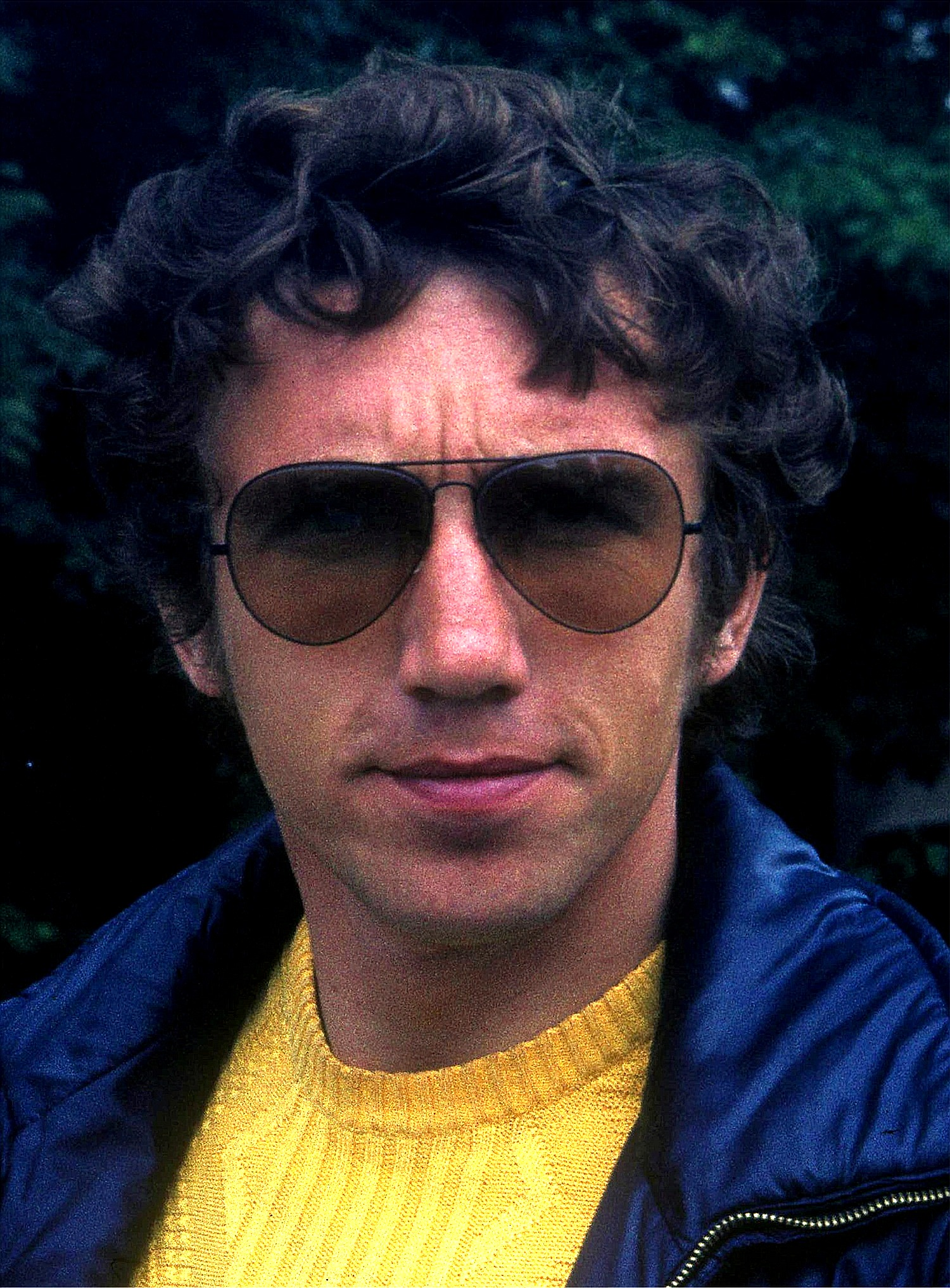
- Stommelen in 1972
- Born: Rolf Johann Stommelen; 11 July 1943; Siegen, North Rhine-Westphalia, German Reich
- Died: 24 April 1983 (aged 39); Riverside, California, U.S.
- Cause of death: Injuries sustained at the 1983 LA Times Grand Prix

Formula One World Championship career
- Nationality: (West Germany) West German
- Active years: 1969–1976, 1978
- Team(s): Privateer Lotus, Brabham, Surtees, Eifelland, Hill, RAM, (Note: Stommelen was entered into the 1976 German Grand Prix with RAM, set to drive a non-works Brabham BT44; in the middle of the practice session, local police impounded the cars following legal action taken by former driver Loris Kessel. Stommelen was transferred to the works Brabham team to drive a spare Alfa Romeo-powered BT45 for the Grand Prix.) Hesketh, Arrows
- Entries: 63 (54 starts)
- Championships: 0
- Wins: 0
- Podiums: 1
- Career points: 14
- Pole positions: 0
- Fastest laps: 0
- First entry: 1969 German Grand Prix
- Last entry: 1978 Canadian Grand Prix

24 Hours of Le Mans career
- Years: 1965–1970, 1972, 1976–1980, 1982
- Teams: Porsche, Alfa Romeo, Kremer, Martini
- Best finish: 2nd (1979)
- Class wins: 3 (1966, 1976, 1979)

Rolf Johann Stommelen (German pronunciation: [ʁɔlf ˈjoːhan ˈʃtoːmeln̩]; 11 July 1943 – 24 April 1983) was a German racing driver, who competed in Formula One from 1969 to 1978. In endurance racing, Stommelen was a four-time winner of the 24 Hours of Daytona with Porsche.

Stommelen participated in 63 Formula One Grands Prix, achieving one podium and 14 championship points. He also participated in several non-championship Formula One races. He was widely successful in sports car racing from the mid-1960s until his death in 1983, winning the 24 Hours of Daytona four times: in 1968, 1978, 1980 and 1982. He also won the 1967 Targa Florio with Porsche.

== Early and personal life ==
Rolf Johann Stommelen was born on 11 July 1943 in Siegen, Prussia, Nazi Germany.

== Career ==
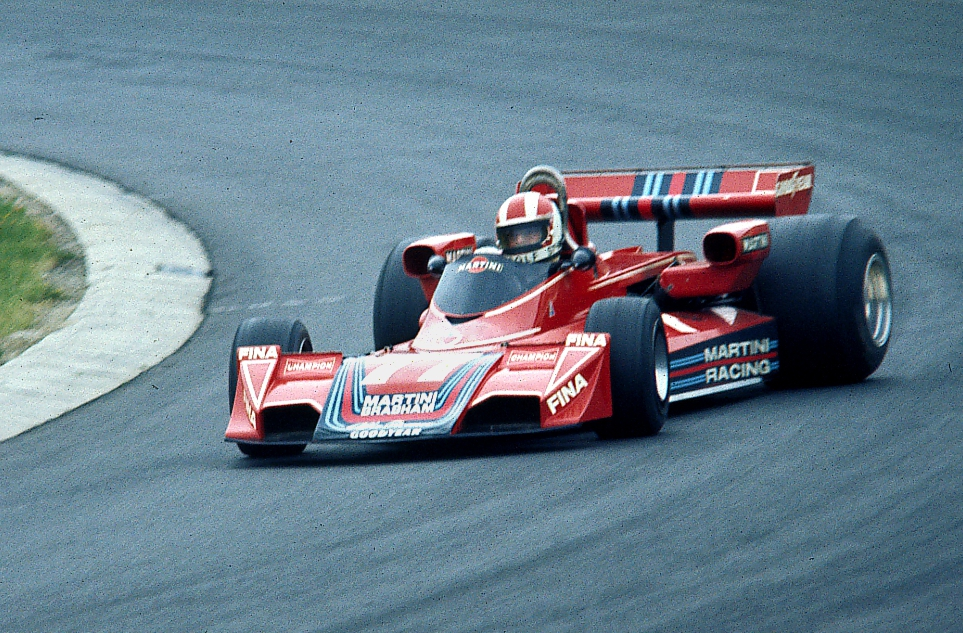
Stommelen driving for Brabham at the 1976 German Grand Prix.

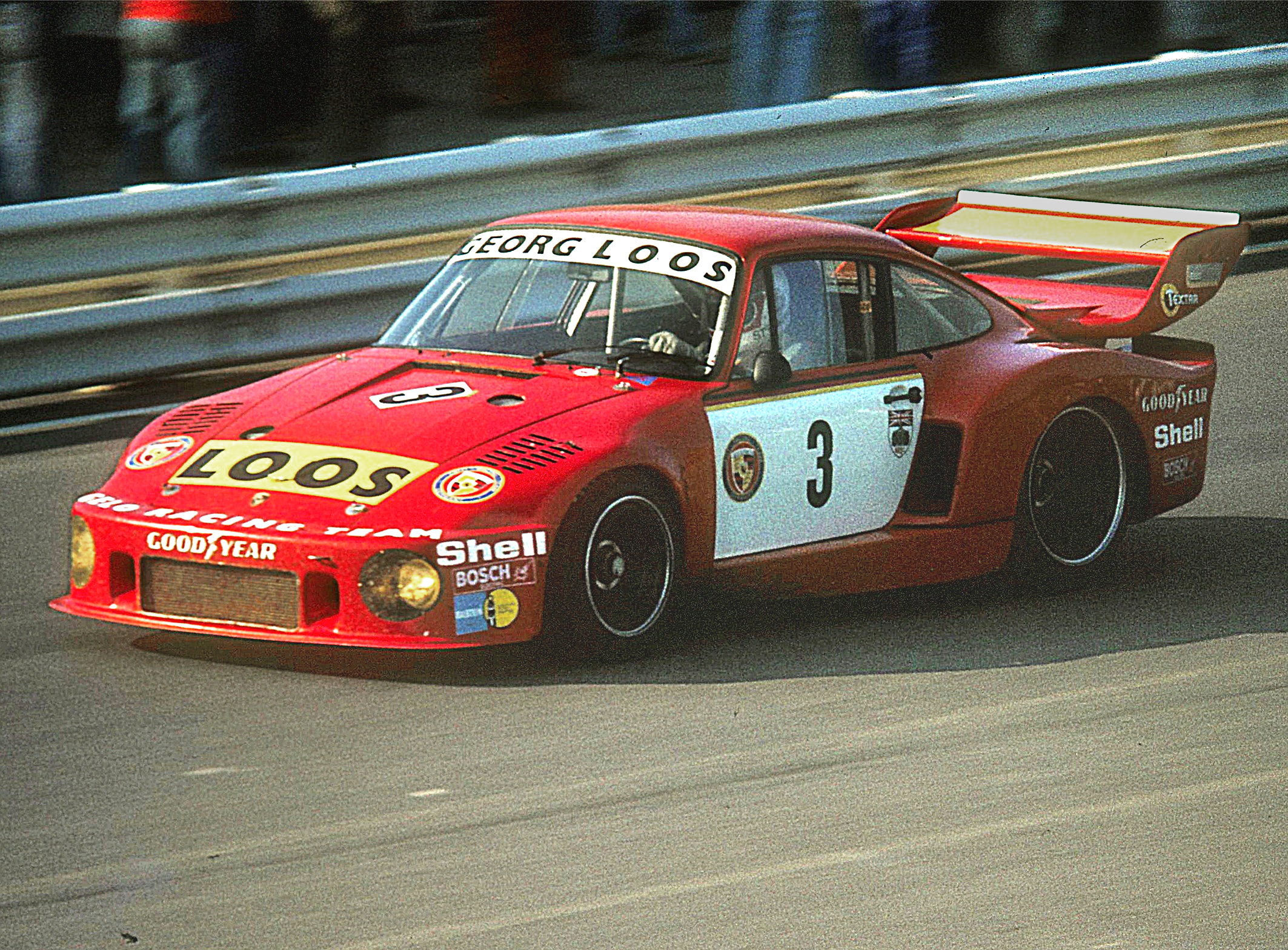
Stommelen driving a Porsche for Georg Loos in 1977.

Stommelen won the pole position for the 1969 24 Hours of Le Mans in a Porsche 917 a year after finishing third in a Porsche 908. In this year, he became the first man to reach speeds exceeding 350 km/h (217 mph) on the Le Mans circuit's Mulsanne Straight in his Porsche 917 LH. In 1970, he made his Formula One debut with Brabham with sponsorship obtained from the German magazine Auto, Motor und Sport and raced both sportscars (Toj and Porsche works teams) and Formula 1 throughout the 1970s.

Stommelen inadvertently played a role in the end of the Spanish Grand Prix's tenure at Montjuich Park in Barcelona when he crashed there in the 1975 race after the rear wing of his Hill GH1 failed which caused his car to fly into the crowd, resulting in the deaths of five spectators and him being seriously injured.

After his recovery, Stommelen returned to sports car racing, winning races for Alfa Romeo and also winning the 24 Hours of Daytona a further three times.

In 1976, Stommelen had the honour to drive the maiden race of the Porsche 936 at the 300 km Nürburgring race. With a black body and without the air-intake, the 936 of this race became known as the black widow. He qualified second, between the factory Renault Alpine A442 of Patrick Depailler and Jean-Pierre Jabouille in first and third. The Renault team was eager to win at Porsche's home soil. On race-day in heavy rain, Stommelen managed to overtake the Renault in front right after the start. Now in the lead, he rushed towards the Nordkehre, braked and deliberately left room for the Renaults in pursuit to overtake. The Renaults, wanting to take back the lead after 2 of 300 km, rushed past Stommelen into the water puddles and crashed into the catch-fences in tandem, with Stommelen taking back the lead again. This led to the saying "On the Nordschleife, you can never brake later than Rolf Stommelen!". After the sixth lap, the throttle cable of the 936 stuck in the "open" position. But instead of giving up, Stommelen continued the race by turning off the master switch at the bends to brake, and turning on the master switch again after the bends to accelerate throughout the rest of the race, taking second place at the end of the race.

In 1978, Stommelen was given the task by the Porsche factory to drive the Porsche 935 "Moby Dick" in Martini Colors. The 78 "Moby Dick" had a 3.2-litre Turbo Engine that produced 845 HP and Stommelen was, with 235 mph, (365 km/h) the fastest man on the Mulsanne Straight, faster than the prototypes like the Porsche 936 and the Renault Alpine A442B which won the race. Due to high fuel-consumption of the engine, Stommelen had to pit too often to battle for the win.

Stommelen continued at Le Mans with the Porsche 935, nearly winning the 24 hours of Le Mans with Dick Barbour and actor Paul Newman as co-drivers in 1979, only to be set back by a 23-minute-long pit stop caused by a stuck wheel nut. The team would not have come so far, if Stommelen had not been constantly seconds faster than his team mates each lap.

Stommelen also drove Toj SC320 prototype sportscars with some success against the works Alfa team (Toj was a small German manufacturer).

Stommelen also competed in one NASCAR Grand National series event in 1971 at Talladega Superspeedway in a former Holman-Moody Ford which Mario Andretti used to win the 1967 Daytona 500, which was rebuilt by Robert Gee (Dale Earnhardt Jr.'s grandfather) as a Mercury Cyclone, with Jake Elder as crew chief. That car eventually was sold to independent driver Darrell Waltrip to use a year later in his Cup Series debut in 1972, which is how it stands today in the latter's museum.

Stommelen was also active in the German GT Championship Deutsche Rennsport Meisterschaft, winning the championship in 1977 for the Gelo Racing Team in a Porsche 935. A master at the Nürburgring, he was a constant winner of races held there.

In the 1980s, Stommelen was still a sought after prototype pilot and achieved success driving the Kremer CK5, Lancia LC1 and Porsche 956 cars.

== Death ==
Stommelen was killed in a crash during the Los Angeles Times Grand Prix 6 hour International Motor Sports Association GT Championship event at Riverside International Raceway on 24 April 1983. He was competing in a John Fitzpatrick entered Porsche 935 with co-driver Derek Bell. Stommelen had just taken over the car from Bell and was running in second place when the rear wing broke due to mechanical failure at 190 mph (306 km/h). The car became uncontrollable, slammed against a concrete wall, somersaulted and caught fire. Stommelen died of blunt force trauma, crushed chest and head injuries.

== Racing record ==
=== 24 Hours of Le Mans results ===
Year	Team	Co-Drivers	Car	Class	Laps	Pos.	Class Pos.
1965	(France) Christian Poirot	(France) Christian Poirot	Porsche 904	GT; 2.0	13	DNF	DNF
1966	(Germany) Porsche System Engineering	(Germany) Günter Klass	Porsche 906/6L Carrera 6	S 2.0	330	7th	**1st**
1967	(Germany) Porsche System Engineering	(Germany) Jochen Neerpasch	Porsche 910/6K	P 2.0	351	6th	**2nd**
1968	(Germany) Porsche System Engineering	(Germany) Jochen Neerpasch	Porsche 908	P 3.0	325	**3rd**	**2nd**
1969	(Germany) Porsche System Engineering	(Germany) Kurt Ahrens Jr.	Porsche 917	S 5.0	148	DNF	DNF
1970	(Italy) Autodelta S.P.A.	(Italy) Nanni Galli	Alfa Romeo T33/3	P 3.0	213	DSQ	DSQ
1972	(Italy) Autodelta S.P.A.	(Italy) Nanni Galli	Alfa Romeo T33/TT/3	S 3.0	263	DNF	DNF
1976	(Germany) Martini Racing Porsche System	(Liechtenstein) Manfred Schurti	Porsche 935	Gr.5	331	4th	**1st**
1977	(Germany) Martini Racing Porsche System	(Liechtenstein) Manfred Schurti	Porsche 935	Gr.5	52	DNF	DNF
1978	(Germany) Martini Racing Porsche System	(Liechtenstein) Manfred Schurti	Porsche 935	Gr.5 +2.0	326	8th	**3rd**
1979	(United States) Dick Barbour Racing	(United States) Paul Newman (United States) Dick Barbour	Porsche 935	IMSA +2.5	299	**2nd**	**1st**
1980	(Germany) Gozzy Kremer Racing	(Japan) Tetsu Ikuzawa (Germany) Axel Plankenhorn	Porsche 935	Gr.5	167	DNF	DNF
1982	(Italy) Martini Racing	(Italy) Michele Alboreto (Italy) Teo Fabi	Lancia LC1	Gr.6	92	DNF	DNF

=== Complete Formula One World Championship results ===
(key)

Year	Entrant	Chassis	Engine	1	2	3	4	5	6	7	8	9	10	11	12	13	14	15	16	WDC	Pts.
1969	Roy Winkelmann Racing	Lotus 59B F2	Ford Cosworth FVA 1.6 L4	RSA	ESP	MON	NED	FRA	GBR	GER; 8	ITA	CAN	USA	MEX						NC	0
1970	Auto Motor und Sport	Brabham BT33	Ford Cosworth DFV 3.0 V8	RSA; Ret	ESP; Ret	MON; DNQ	BEL; 5	NED; DNQ	FRA; 7	GBR; DNS	GER; 5	AUT; 3	ITA; 5	CAN; Ret	USA; 12	MEX; Ret				11th	10
1971	Auto Motor und Sport Eifelland Team Surtees	Surtees TS7	Ford Cosworth DFV 3.0 V8	RSA; 12																20th	3
1971	Auto Motor und Sport Eifelland Team Surtees	Surtees TS9	Ford Cosworth DFV 3.0 V8		ESP; Ret	MON; 6	NED; DSQ	FRA; 11	GBR; 5	GER; 10	AUT; 7	ITA; DNS	CAN; Ret	USA						20th	3
1972	Team Eifelland Caravans	Eifelland E21	Ford Cosworth DFV 3.0 V8	ARG	RSA; 13	ESP; Ret	MON; 10	BEL; 11	FRA; 16	GBR; 10	GER; Ret	AUT; 15	ITA	CAN	USA					NC	0
1973	Ceramica Pagnossin Team MRD	Brabham BT42	Ford Cosworth DFV 3.0 V8	ARG	BRA	RSA	ESP	BEL	MON	SWE	FRA	GBR	NED	GER; 11	AUT; Ret	ITA; 12	CAN; 12	USA		NC	0
1974	Embassy Racing with Graham Hill	Lola T370	Ford Cosworth DFV 3.0 V8	ARG	BRA	RSA	ESP	BEL	MON	SWE	NED	FRA	GBR	GER	AUT; Ret	ITA; Ret	CAN; 11	USA; 12		NC	0
1975	Embassy Racing with Graham Hill	Lola T370	Ford Cosworth DFV 3.0 V8	ARG; 13	BRA; 14															NC	0
1975	Embassy Racing with Graham Hill	Lola T371	Ford Cosworth DFV 3.0 V8			RSA; 7														NC	0
1975	Embassy Racing with Graham Hill	Hill GH1	Ford Cosworth DFV 3.0 V8				ESP; Ret	MON	BEL	SWE	NED	FRA	GBR	GER	AUT; 16	ITA; Ret	USA			NC	0
1976	RAM Racing	Brabham BT44B	Ford Cosworth DFV 3.0 V8	BRA	RSA	USW	ESP	BEL	MON	SWE	FRA	GBR	GER; DNS							20th	1
1976	Martini Racing	Brabham BT45	Alfa Romeo 115-12 3.0 F12										GER; 6	AUT		ITA; Ret	CAN	USA	JPN	20th	1
1976	Penthouse Rizla+. Racing	Hesketh 308D	Ford Cosworth DFV 3.0 V8												NED; 12					20th	1
1978	Warsteiner Arrows Racing Team	Arrows FA1	Ford Cosworth DFV 3.0 V8	ARG	BRA	RSA; 9	USW; 9	MON; Ret	BEL; Ret	ESP; 14	SWE; 14	FRA; 15	GBR; DNQ	GER; DSQ						NC	0
1978	Warsteiner Arrows Racing Team	Arrows A1	Ford Cosworth DFV 3.0 V8												AUT; DNPQ	NED; DNPQ	ITA; DNPQ	USA; 16	CAN; DNQ	NC	0

=== Formula One non-championship results ===
(key) (Races in bold indicate pole position) (Races in italics indicate fastest lap)

Year	Entrant	Chassis	Engine	1	2	3	4	5	6	7	8
1971	Auto Motor und Sport Eifelland Team Surtees	Surtees TS7	Ford Cosworth DFV 3.0 V8	**ARG**; Ret	ROC	QUE	SPR	INT			
1971	Auto Motor und Sport Eifelland Team Surtees	Surtees TS9	Ford Cosworth DFV 3.0 V8						RIN; 7	OUL	VIC
1972	Team Eifelland Caravans	Eifelland E21	Ford Cosworth DFV 3.0 V8	ROC; 12	BRA	INT	OUL	REP	VIC		
1975	Embassy Racing with Graham Hill	Hill GH1	Ford Cosworth DFV 3.0 V8	ROC; 9	INT	SUI; 12					

=== Complete European Formula Two Championship results ===
(key) (Races in bold indicate pole position; races in italics indicate fastest lap)

Year	Entrant	Chassis	Engine	1	2	3	4	5	6	7	8	9	10	11	12	13	14	15	16	17	Pos.	Pts
1970	Eifelland Wohnwagenbau	March 702	Ford	THR; Ret	HOC; 6	BAR; 12	ROU														NC	0^{‡}
1970	Eifelland Wohnwagenbau	Brabham BT30	Ford					PER; 6	TUL; Ret	IMO; 5	HOC										NC	0^{‡}
1971	Team Eifelland Caravans	Brabham BT36	Ford	HOC	THR	NÜR; Ret	JAR	PAL; DNQ	ROU	MAN; Ret	TUL	ALB	VAL	VAL							NC	0
1973	Fina	Brabham BT40	Ford	MAL	HOC	THR	NÜR	PAU	KIN	NIV	HOC	ROU	MNZ	MAN	KAR	PER	SAL	NOR	ALB	VAL; Ret	NC	0
1974	Team Ecuador	Surtees TS15A	BMW	BAR	HOC	PAU	SAL	HOC; DNS	MUG	KAR	PER	HOC	VAL								NC	0
1976	Rolf Stommelen	Chevron B35	BMW	HOC	THR	VAL	SAL	PAU	HOC; Ret	ROU	MUG	PER	EST								NC	0
1976	March Engineering	March 762	BMW											NOG; 7							NC	0
1976	Fred Opert Racing	Chevron B35	Hart												HOC; 16						NC	0

^{‡} Graded drivers not eligible for European Formula Two Championship points

=== Complete British Saloon Car Championship results ===
(key) (Races in bold indicate pole position; races in italics indicate fastest lap.)

Year	Team	Car	Class	1	2	3	4	5	6	7	8	9	10	11	12	Pos.	Pts	Class
1970	Ford Köln	Ford Capri 2300 GT	D	BRH	SNE	THR	SIL	CRY	SIL	SIL; 25	CRO	BRH	OUL	BRH	BRH	NC	0	NC

=== NASCAR ===
(key) (Bold – Pole position awarded by qualifying time. Italics – Pole position earned by points standings or practice time. * – Most laps led.)

==== Winston Cup Series ====
NASCAR Winston Cup Series results
Year	Team	No.	Make	1	2	3	4	5	6	7	8	9	10	11	12	13	14	15	16	17	18	19	20	21	22	23	24	25	26	27	28	29	30	31	32	33	34	35	36	37	38	39	40	41	42	43	44	45	46	47	48	NWCC	Pts	Ref
1971	Holman-Moody	52	Mercury	RSD	DAY	DAY	DAY	ONT	RCH	CAR	HCY	BRI	ATL	CLB	GPS	SMR	NWS	MAR	DAR	SBO	TAL	ASH	KPT	CLT	DOV	MCH	RSD	HOU	GPS	DAY	BRI	AST	ISP	TRN	NSV	ATL	BGS	ONA	MCH	TAL; 39	CLB	HCY	DAR	MAR	CLT	DOV	CAR	MGR	RCH	NWS	TWS	NA	0	
