= 1971 Monaco Grand Prix =

Coordinates: 43°44′4.74″N 7°25′16.8″E

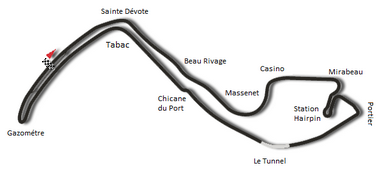

Race details
- Date: May 23, 1971
- Official name: XXIX Grand Prix de Monaco
- Location: Circuit de Monaco, Monte Carlo, Monaco
- Course: Street circuit
- Course length: 3.145 km (1.954 miles)
- Distance: 80 laps, 251.600 km (156.337 miles)
- Weather: Overcast

Pole position
Driver	(United Kingdom) Jackie Stewart	Tyrrell-Ford
- Time: 1:23.2

Fastest lap
Driver	(United Kingdom) Jackie Stewart	Tyrrell-Ford
- Time: 1:22.2 on lap 57 (lap record)

Podium
First	(United Kingdom) Jackie Stewart	Tyrrell-Ford
Second	(Sweden) Ronnie Peterson	March-Ford
Third	(Belgium) Jacky Ickx	Ferrari

The 1971 Monaco Grand Prix was a Formula One motor race held at Monaco on May 23, 1971. It was race 3 of 11 in both the 1971 World Championship of Drivers and the 1971 International Cup for Formula One Manufacturers and the 200th World Championship Grand Prix held since the championship began in 1950. This was the last race on the original Monaco circuit, as a dedicated pit lane was created along the harbor before Tabac in 1972.

Events of the race are captured in the documentary film Weekend of a Champion in which Roman Polanski shadows Jackie Stewart.

== Race report ==
Qualifying was extremely wet and so it was Friday morning times that really counted for the grid - for Mario Andretti this was particularly unfortunate as his car was stranded out on the track at this time and so he was unable to qualify despite lying second in the World Championship. Jackie Stewart claimed a stunning pole position over a second ahead of his front row companion Jacky Ickx and shot into an immediate lead from the fast-starting Jo Siffert, Ickx, Pedro Rodríguez, Ronnie Peterson and Denny Hulme. Chris Amon stalled on the grid and Graham Hill - seeking a 6th Monaco win - made a rare mistake, hitting the wall at Tabac on the 2nd lap.

Stewart extended his lead from Siffert and Ickx, despite being painfully ill from fumes leaking into the cockpit. Peterson was astonishing the crowd with his valiant attempts to take 4th place from Rodríguez, who was baulking him as much as was legally possible. Hulme actually managed to join the battle and pass Peterson on one lap. Eventually the Mexican slipped up under pressure and locked up a wheel to let both Peterson and Hulme through.

The Who used parts of the Grand Prix and showed Jackie Stewart in the music video for the song "Baba O'Riley".

== Classification ==
=== Qualifying ===
Pos	No	Driver	Constructor	Time	Gap
1	11	(United Kingdom) Jackie Stewart	Tyrrell-Ford	1:23.2	—
2	4	(Belgium) Jacky Ickx	Ferrari	1:24.4	+1.2
3	14	(Switzerland) Jo Siffert	BRM	1:24.8	+1.6
4	20	(New Zealand) Chris Amon	Matra	1:24.8	+1.6
5	15	(Mexico) Pedro Rodríguez	BRM	1:25.1	+1.9
6	9	(New Zealand) Denny Hulme	McLaren-Ford	1:25.3	+2.1
7	21	(France) Jean-Pierre Beltoise	Matra	1:25.6	+2.4
8	17	(Sweden) Ronnie Peterson	March-Ford	1:25.8	+2.6
9	7	(United Kingdom) Graham Hill	Brabham-Ford	1:26.0	+2.8
10	22	(United Kingdom) John Surtees	Surtees-Ford	1:26.0	+2.8
11	5	(Switzerland) Clay Regazzoni	Ferrari	1:26.1	+2.9
12	2	(Sweden) Reine Wisell	Lotus-Ford	1:26.7	+3.5
13	27	(France) Henri Pescarolo	March-Ford	1:26.7	+3.5
14	10	(United Kingdom) Peter Gethin	McLaren-Ford	1:26.9	+3.7
15	12	(France) François Cevert	Tyrrell-Ford	1:27.2	+4.0
16	24	(Germany) Rolf Stommelen	Surtees-Ford	1:27.2	+4.0
17	1	(Brazil) Emerson Fittipaldi	Lotus-Ford	1:27.7	+4.5
18	8	(Australia) Tim Schenken	Brabham-Ford	1:28.3	+5.1
DNQ	16	(New Zealand) Howden Ganley	BRM	1:28.8	+5.6
DNQ	6	(United States) Mario Andretti	Ferrari	1:29.1	+5.9
DNQ	19	(Italy) Nanni Galli*	March-Alfa Romeo	1:34.6	+11.4
DNQ	18	(Spain) Alex Soler-Roig	March-Ford	1:44.4	+21.2
DNQ	28	(United States) Skip Barber	March-Ford	2:48.6	+1:25.4

=== Race ===
Pos	No	Driver	Constructor	Laps	Time/Retired	Grid	Points
1	11	(United Kingdom) Jackie Stewart	Tyrrell-Ford	80	1:52:21.3	1	9
2	17	(Sweden) Ronnie Peterson	March-Ford	80	+ 25.6	8	6
3	4	(Belgium) Jacky Ickx	Ferrari	80	+ 53.3	2	4
4	9	(New Zealand) Denny Hulme	McLaren-Ford	80	+ 1:06.7	6	3
5	1	(Brazil) Emerson Fittipaldi	Lotus-Ford	79	+ 1 Lap	17	2
6	24	(Germany) Rolf Stommelen	Surtees-Ford	79	+ 1 Lap	16	1
7	22	(United Kingdom) John Surtees	Surtees-Ford	79	+ 1 Lap	10	
8	27	(France) Henri Pescarolo	March-Ford	77	+ 3 Laps	13	
9	15	(Mexico) Pedro Rodríguez	BRM	76	+ 4 Laps	5	
10	8	(Australia) Tim Schenken	Brabham-Ford	76	+ 4 Laps	18	
Ret	14	(Switzerland) Jo Siffert	BRM	58	Oil pipe	3	
Ret	21	(France) Jean-Pierre Beltoise	Matra	47	Differential	7	
Ret	20	(New Zealand) Chris Amon	Matra	45	Differential	4	
Ret	5	(Switzerland) Clay Regazzoni	Ferrari	24	Accident	11	
Ret	10	(United Kingdom) Peter Gethin	McLaren-Ford	22	Accident	14	
Ret	2	(Sweden) Reine Wisell	Lotus-Ford	21	Wheel bearing	12	
Ret	12	(France) François Cevert	Tyrrell-Ford	5	Accident	15	
Ret	7	(United Kingdom) Graham Hill	Brabham-Ford	1	Accident	9	
DNQ	16	(New Zealand) Howden Ganley	BRM				
DNQ	6	(United States) Mario Andretti	Ferrari				
DNQ	19	(Italy) Nanni Galli*	March-Alfa Romeo				
DNQ	18	(Spain) Alex Soler-Roig	March-Ford				
DNQ	28	(United States) Skip Barber	March-Ford				

- - Andrea de Adamich was listed as the driver of the #19 March, but never drove. Galli was entered instead.

== Notes ==
- This was the Formula One World Championship debut for American driver Skip Barber.
- This was the first fastest lap set and first Grand Slam for British constructor Tyrrell.
- This was Graham Hill's 127th Grand Prix start, thereby breaking the old record set by Jack Brabham at the 1970 Mexican Grand Prix.

== Championship standings after the race ==
Drivers' Championship standings

	Pos	Driver	Points
	1	(United Kingdom) Jackie Stewart	24
1	2	(Belgium) Jacky Ickx	10
1	3	(United States) Mario Andretti	9
11	4	(Sweden) Ronnie Peterson	6
1	5	(New Zealand) Chris Amon	6

Constructors' Championship standings

	Pos	Constructor	Points
1	1	(United Kingdom) Tyrrell-Ford	24
1	2	(Italy) Ferrari	19
6	3	(United Kingdom) March-Ford	6
1	4	(France) Matra	6
1	5	(United Kingdom) McLaren-Ford	6

- Note: Only the top five positions are included for both sets of standings.

Previous race: 1971 Spanish Grand Prix	FIA Formula One World Championship; 1971 season	Next race: 1971 Dutch Grand Prix
Previous race: 1970 Monaco Grand Prix	Monaco Grand Prix	Next race: 1972 Monaco Grand Prix
