= Eifelland =

Formula One team

Eifelland as a Formula One chassis constructor
- Official name(s): Team Eifelland Caravans
- Base: West Germany
- Founder(s): Günther Hennerici
- Notable staff: Luigi Colani

Formula One World Championship career
- Engines: Cosworth V8
- First entry: 1972 South African Grand Prix
- Last entry: 1972 Austrian Grand Prix
- Races entered: 8
- Race victories: 0
- Constructors' Championships: 0
- Drivers' Championships: 0
- Pole positions: 0
- Fastest laps: 0

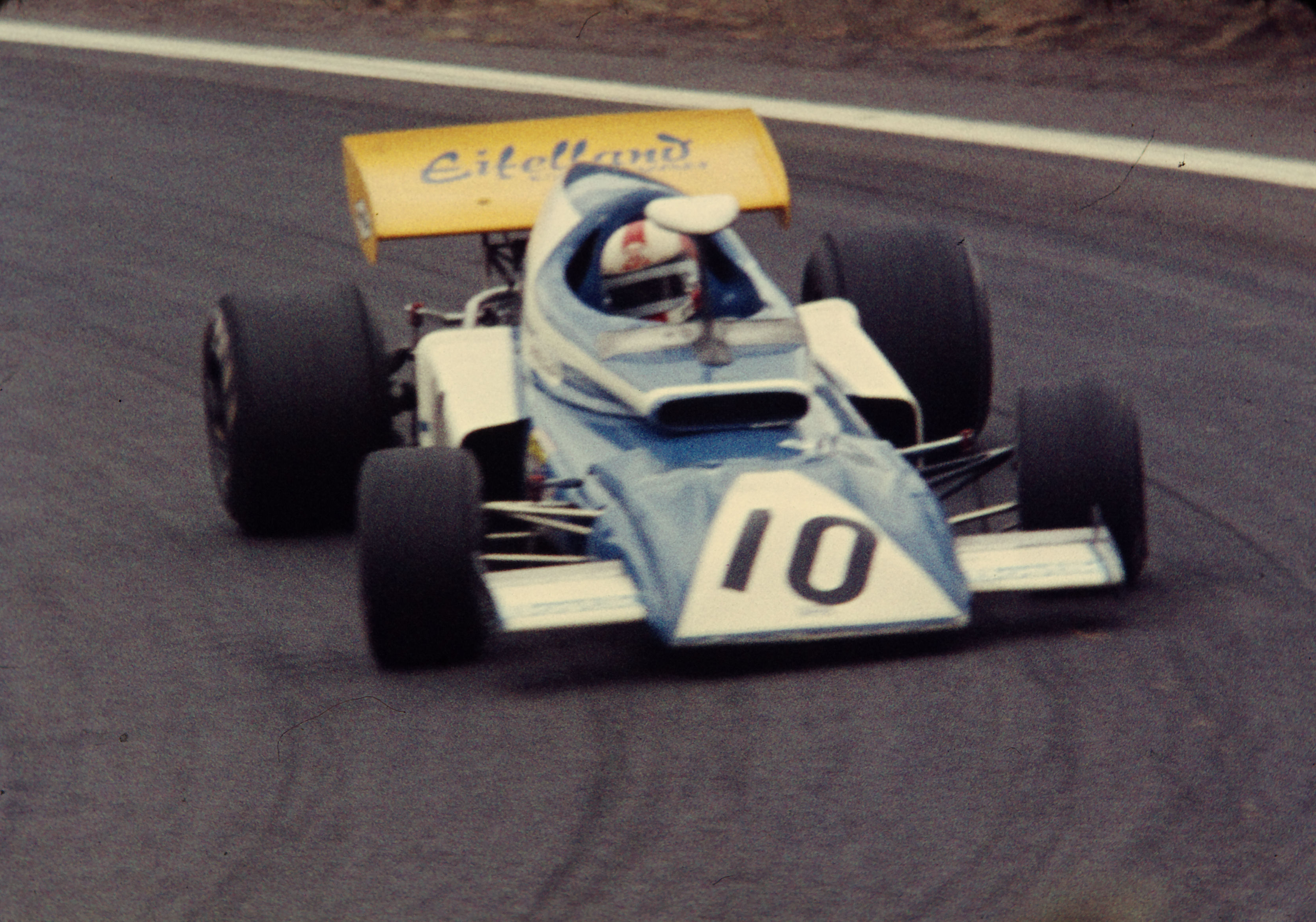
Eifelland E21 in the 1972 French Grand Prix.

Eifelland was a German Formula One team, named after its owner Günther Hennerici's caravan manufacturing company. The name Eifelland was chosen after the Eifel mountains where Hennerici was born, which are located close to the Nürburgring.

== History ==
Günther's twin brother, Heinz Hennerici, was a World War II tank commander who lost his left arm in combat. The accident didn't prevent him from becoming a rather successful touring car racing driver, eventually competing in the Nürburgring 24 Hours. The Hennerici brothers were also instrumental in the establishment of the Automobil-Club Mayen. In 1970 Günther married Hannelore Werner, one of the few female Formula 2 and sports car drivers around at the time.

In 1971 Günther Hennerici decided to expand his activities to motor racing and founded his own team, Eifelland. Initially the team competed mostly in Formula Three, with drivers such as Willi Deutsch, Gerd Koppenhauser, Erwin Derichs, Hans Hargarten and Werner herself. In 1972 he chose to graduate to Formula One and field one single car with Rolf Stommelen at the wheel. The car was based on a March 721 Formula One car, redesigned by German designer Luigi Colani in his typical rounded aerodynamic style, and presented some innovative features. An air intake in front of the driver would guide the air around the cockpit to the engine, and one single rear view mirror was mounted in front of the driver. Although reasonably reliable, the car suffered from overheating and scarce downforce. Stomelen's best results were two top-ten finishes at the 1972 Monaco Grand Prix and the 1972 British Grand Prix, and at the end of the 1972 Formula One season the team decided to focus exclusively on Formula Three. After a couple of unsuccessful seasons, in 1974 Hennerici sold the team and his caravan company and retired.

Heinz's grandson, Marc Hennerici, is also a racing driver. He won the 2005 World Touring Car Championship's Independents Trophy.

== Complete Formula One World Championship results ==
(key)

Year	Chassis	Engine	Tyres	Driver	1	2	3	4	5	6	7	8	9	10	11	12	Points	WCC
1972	Eifelland E21	Cosworth V8	G		ARG	RSA	ESP	MON	BEL	FRA	GBR	GER	AUT	ITA	CAN	USA	0	NC
1972	Eifelland E21	Cosworth V8	G	(Germany) Rolf Stommelen		13	Ret	10	11	16	10	Ret	15				0	NC
