= 1973 German Grand Prix =

Race details
- Date: 5 August 1973
- Official name: XXXV Großer Preis von Deutschland
- Location: Nürburgring, Nürburg, Germany
- Course: Permanent racing facility
- Course length: 22.835 km (14.19 miles)
- Distance: 14 laps, 319.690 km (198.65 miles)
- Weather: Dry

Pole position
Driver	(United Kingdom) Jackie Stewart	Tyrrell-Ford
- Time: 7:07.8

Fastest lap
Driver	(Brazil) Carlos Pace	Surtees-Ford
- Time: 7:11.4 on lap 13

Podium
First	(United Kingdom) Jackie Stewart	Tyrrell-Ford
Second	(France) François Cevert	Tyrrell-Ford
Third	(Belgium) Jacky Ickx	McLaren-Ford

The 1973 German Grand Prix was a Formula One motor race held at Nürburgring on 5 August 1973. It was race 11 of 15 in both the 1973 World Championship of Drivers and the 1973 International Cup for Formula One Manufacturers.

The 14-lap race was won from pole position by Jackie Stewart, driving a Tyrrell-Ford. It was Stewart's 27th and final Grand Prix victory, a record that would stand until 1987. Teammate François Cevert finished second, with Jacky Ickx third in a McLaren-Ford. It was also the last win for a Scottish driver until David Coulthard at the 1995 Portuguese Grand Prix.

Ferrari did not participate in this race due to internal political issues and the uncompetitiveness of their car, enabling regular Ferrari driver and Nürburgring specialist Ickx to accept a one-off drive for McLaren.

The works March team also did not participate in this race following the accident at the Dutch Grand Prix the previous weekend that had claimed the life of Roger Williamson. The Ensign, Tecno and Hesketh teams also did not participate. To boost the field, the McLaren, Brabham and Surtees teams all entered three cars: Ferrari released Ickx to drive the third McLaren; Rolf Stommelen drove the third Brabham in place of the injured Andrea de Adamich; and Jochen Mass drove the third Surtees.

Niki Lauda, who out-qualified his teammates by more than 8 seconds crashed at Kesselchen on Lap 2 and injured his wrist; he had to miss the subsequent race, the Austrian Grand Prix, which was his home race.

== Qualifying ==
=== Qualifying classification ===
Pos.	Driver	Constructor	Time	No
1	Jackie Stewart	Tyrrell-Ford	7:07.8	1
2	Ronnie Peterson	Lotus-Ford	7:08.3	2
3	François Cevert	Tyrrell-Ford	7:09.3	3
4	Jacky Ickx	McLaren-Ford	7:09.7	4
5	Niki Lauda	BRM	7:09.9	5
6	Carlos Reutemann	Brabham-Ford	7:15.1	6
7	Peter Revson	McLaren-Ford	7:15.9	7
8	Denis Hulme	McLaren-Ford	7:16.5	8
9	Jean-Pierre Beltoise	BRM	7:18.1	9
10	Clay Regazzoni	BRM	7:18.2	10
11	Carlos Pace	Surtees-Ford	7:18.8	11
12	Henri Pescarolo	Iso-Ford	7:18.8	12
13	Wilson Fittipaldi	Brabham-Ford	7:19.1	13
14	Emerson Fittipaldi	Lotus-Ford	7:19.7	14
15	Jochen Mass	Surtees-Ford	7:20.4	15
16	Rolf Stommelen	Brabham-Ford	7:22.2	16
17	Jackie Oliver	Shadow-Ford	7:22.3	17
18	Mike Hailwood	Surtees-Ford	7:22.3	18
19	Howden Ganley	Iso-Ford	7:25.1	DNS
20	Mike Beuttler	March-Ford	7:26.6	19
21	Graham Hill	Shadow-Ford	7:27.1	20
22	George Follmer	Shadow-Ford	7:28.3	21
23	David Purley	March-Ford	7:54.2	22

== Race ==
=== Classification ===
Pos	No	Driver	Constructor	Laps	Time/Retired	Grid	Points
1	5	(United Kingdom) Jackie Stewart	Tyrrell-Ford	14	1:42:03.0	1	9
2	6	(France) François Cevert	Tyrrell-Ford	14	+ 1.6	3	6
3	30	(Belgium) Jacky Ickx	McLaren-Ford	14	+ 41.2	4	4
4	24	(Brazil) Carlos Pace	Surtees-Ford	14	+ 53.8	11	3
5	11	(Brazil) Wilson Fittipaldi	Brabham-Ford	14	+ 1:19.9	13	2
6	1	(Brazil) Emerson Fittipaldi	Lotus-Ford	14	+ 1:24.3	14	1
7	31	(West Germany) Jochen Mass	Surtees-Ford	14	+ 1:25.2	15	
8	17	(United Kingdom) Jackie Oliver	Shadow-Ford	14	+ 1:25.7	17	
9	8	(United States) Peter Revson	McLaren-Ford	14	+ 2:11.8	7	
10	26	(France) Henri Pescarolo	Iso-Marlboro-Ford	14	+ 2:22.5	12	
11	9	(West Germany) Rolf Stommelen	Brabham-Ford	14	+ 3:27.3	16	
12	7	(New Zealand) Denny Hulme	McLaren-Ford	14	+ 3:38.7	8	
13	12	(United Kingdom) Graham Hill	Shadow-Ford	14	+ 3:49.0	20	
14	23	(United Kingdom) Mike Hailwood	Surtees-Ford	13	+ 1 Lap	18	
15	18	(United Kingdom) David Purley	March-Ford	13	+ 1 Lap	22	
16	15	(United Kingdom) Mike Beuttler	March-Ford	13	+ 1 Lap	19	
Ret	10	(Argentina) Carlos Reutemann	Brabham-Ford	7	Engine	6	
Ret	19	(Switzerland) Clay Regazzoni	BRM	7	Engine	10	
Ret	16	(United States) George Follmer	Shadow-Ford	5	Accident	21	
Ret	20	(France) Jean-Pierre Beltoise	BRM	4	Gearbox	9	
Ret	21	(Austria) Niki Lauda	BRM	1	Accident	5	
Ret	2	(Sweden) Ronnie Peterson	Lotus-Ford	0	Ignition	2	
DNS	25	(New Zealand) Howden Ganley	Iso-Marlboro-Ford		Accident in qualifying		

== Notes ==
- This was the 5th fastest lap set by a Brazilian driver.

== Championship standings after the race ==
Drivers' Championship standings

	Pos	Driver	Points
	1	(United Kingdom) **Jackie Stewart***	60
1	2	(France) **François Cevert***	45
1	3	(Brazil) **Emerson Fittipaldi***	42
	4	(Sweden) **Ronnie Peterson***	25
	5	(United States) Peter Revson	23

Constructors' Championship standings

Pos	Constructor	Points
1	(United Kingdom) **Tyrrell-Ford***	71 (75)
2	(United Kingdom) **Lotus-Ford***	59 (63)
3	(United Kingdom) **McLaren-Ford***	42
4	(United Kingdom) Brabham-Ford	14
5	(Italy) Ferrari	12

- Note: Only the top five positions are included for both sets of standings. Only the best 7 results from the first 8 races and the best 6 results from the last 7 races counted towards the Championship. Numbers without parentheses are Championship points; numbers in parentheses are total points scored.
- Competitors in bold and marked with an asterisk still had a theoretical chance of becoming World Champion.

Previous race: 1973 Dutch Grand Prix	FIA Formula One World Championship; 1973 season	Next race: 1973 Austrian Grand Prix
Previous race: 1972 German Grand Prix	German Grand Prix	Next race: 1974 German Grand Prix
