= 1972 British Grand Prix =

Race details
- Date: 15 July 1972
- Official name: John Player Grand Prix
- Location: Brands Hatch; Kent, England
- Course: Permanent racing facility
- Course length: 4.26 km (2.65 miles)
- Distance: 76 laps, 324.122 km (201.400 miles)
- Weather: Warm, dry

Pole position
Driver	(Belgium) Jacky Ickx	Ferrari
- Time: 1:22.2

Fastest lap
Driver	(United Kingdom) Jackie Stewart	Tyrrell-Ford
- Time: 1:24.0 on lap 58

Podium
First	(Brazil) Emerson Fittipaldi	Lotus-Ford
Second	(United Kingdom) Jackie Stewart	Tyrrell-Ford
Third	(United States) Peter Revson	McLaren-Ford

The 1972 British Grand Prix (formally the John Player Grand Prix) was a Formula One motor race held at Brands Hatch on 15 July 1972. It was race 7 of 12 in both the 1972 World Championship of Drivers and the 1972 International Cup for Formula One Manufacturers. The race was won by Brazilian driver Emerson Fittipaldi driving a Lotus 72D.

Ronnie Peterson suffered an engine failure with less than two laps to go, and crashed into the parked cars of Graham Hill and François Cevert. Arturo Merzario finished sixth on his debut; he was the last driver whose first race was with Ferrari until Oliver Bearman at the 2024 Saudi Arabian Grand Prix, 52 years later.

== Qualifying ==
=== Qualifying classification ===
Pos.	No	Driver	Constructor	Time	Gap	Grid
1	5	(Belgium) Jacky Ickx	Ferrari	1:22,2		1
2	8	(Brazil) Emerson Fittipaldi	Lotus-Ford	1:22,6	+0.4	2
3	19	(United States) Peter Revson	McLaren-Ford	1:22,7	+0.5	3
4	1	(United Kingdom) Jackie Stewart	Tyrrell-Ford	1:22,9	+0.7	4
5	22	(Australia) Tim Schenken	Surtees-Ford	1:23,2	+1.0	5
6	11	(France) Jean-Pierre Beltoise	BRM	1:23,4	+1.2	6
7	21	(United Kingdom) Mike Hailwood	Surtees-Ford	1:23,5	+1.3	7
8	3	(Sweden) Ronnie Peterson	March-Ford	1:23,7	+1.5	8
9	6	(Italy) Arturo Merzario	Ferrari	1:23,7	+1.5	9
10	27	(Argentina) Carlos Reutemann	Brabham–Ford	1:23,8	+1.6	10
11	18	(New Zealand) Denny Hulme	McLaren-Ford	1:23,9	+1.7	11
12	2	(France) François Cevert	Tyrrell-Ford	1:23,9	+1.7	12
13	25	(Brazil) Carlos Pace	March-Ford	1:24,0	+1.8	13
14	14	(United Kingdom) Jackie Oliver	BRM	1:24,4	+2.2	14
15	9	(Australia) David Walker	Lotus-Ford	1:24,4	+2.2	15
16	12	(United Kingdom) Peter Gethin	BRM	1:24,5	+2.3	16
17	17	(New Zealand) Chris Amon	Matra	1:24,6	+2.4	17
18	30	(Italy) Nanni Galli	Tecno	1:25,1	+2.9	18
19	4	(Austria) Niki Lauda	March-Ford	1:25,1	+2.9	19
20	23	(Italy) Andrea de Adamich	Surtees-Ford	1:25,2	+3.0	20
21	26	(United Kingdom) Graham Hill	Brabham-Ford	1:25,2	+3.0	21
22	28	(Brazil) Wilson Fittipaldi	Brabham-Ford	1:25,5	+3.3	22
23	31	(United Kingdom) Mike Beuttler	March-Ford	1:25,6	+3.4	23
24	29	(South Africa) Dave Charlton	Lotus-Ford	1:25,6	+3.4	24
25	33	(West Germany) Rolf Stommelen	Eifelland-Ford	1:26,3	+4.1	25
26	24	(France) Henri Pescarolo	Politoys-Ford	1:27,4	+5.2	26
27	34	(France) François Migault	Connew-Ford	1:30,3	+8.1	DNS

== Race ==
=== Classification ===
Pos	No	Driver	Constructor	Laps	Time/Retired	Grid	Points
1	8	(Brazil) Emerson Fittipaldi	Lotus-Ford	76	1:47:50.2	2	9
2	1	(United Kingdom) Jackie Stewart	Tyrrell-Ford	76	+ 4.1	4	6
3	19	(United States) Peter Revson	McLaren-Ford	76	+ 1:12.5	3	4
4	17	(New Zealand) Chris Amon	Matra	75	+ 1 Lap	17	3
5	18	(New Zealand) Denny Hulme	McLaren-Ford	75	+ 1 Lap	11	2
6	6	(Italy) Arturo Merzario	Ferrari	75	+ 1 Lap	9	1
7	3	(Sweden) Ronnie Peterson	March-Ford	74	Engine/accident	8	
8	27	(Argentina) Carlos Reutemann	Brabham-Ford	73	+ 3 Laps	10	
9	4	(Austria) Niki Lauda	March-Ford	73	+ 3 Laps	19	
10	33	(Germany) Rolf Stommelen	Eifelland-Ford	71	+ 5 Laps	25	
11	11	(France) Jean-Pierre Beltoise	BRM	70	+ 6 Laps	6	
12	28	(Brazil) Wilson Fittipaldi	Brabham-Ford	69	Suspension	22	
13	31	(United Kingdom) Mike Beuttler	March-Ford	69	+ 7 Laps	23	
Ret	22	(Australia) Tim Schenken	Surtees-Ford	64	Suspension	5	
Ret	2	(France) François Cevert	Tyrrell-Ford	60	Spun off	12	
Ret	9	(Australia) Dave Walker	Lotus-Ford	59	Suspension	15	
Ret	5	(Belgium) Jacky Ickx	Ferrari	49	Oil pressure	1	
Ret	26	(United Kingdom) Graham Hill	Brabham-Ford	47	Spun off	21	
Ret	25	(Brazil) Carlos Pace	March-Ford	39	Differential	13	
Ret	14	(United Kingdom) Jackie Oliver	BRM	36	Suspension	14	
Ret	21	(United Kingdom) Mike Hailwood	Surtees-Ford	31	Gearbox	7	
Ret	29	(South Africa) Dave Charlton	Lotus-Ford	21	Gearbox	24	
Ret	30	(Italy) Nanni Galli	Tecno	9	Spun off	18	
Ret	24	(France) Henri Pescarolo	Politoys-Ford	7	Accident	26	
Ret	12	(United Kingdom) Peter Gethin	BRM	5	Engine	16	
Ret	23	(Italy) Andrea de Adamich	Surtees-Ford	3	Accident	20	
DNS	34	(France) François Migault	Connew-Ford		Suspension		
WD	7	(United States) Mario Andretti	Ferrari				
WD	10	(United Kingdom) Tony Trimmer	Lotus-Ford		Engine		
WD	15	(Sweden) Reine Wisell	BRM				
WD	16	(Austria) Helmut Marko	BRM				
WD	20	(United Kingdom) Brian Redman	McLaren-Ford				
WD	32	(United Kingdom) Ray Allen	March-Ford				

== Notes ==
- This was the Formula One World Championship debut for Italian driver Arturo Merzario and French driver François Migault.
- This race marked the 10th podium finish for a Brazilian driver.
- This was the 8th win of a British Grand Prix by a Lotus. This broke the old record set by Ferrari at the 1961 British Grand Prix.

== Championship standings after the race ==
Drivers' Championship standings

	Pos	Driver	Points
	1	(Brazil) **Emerson Fittipaldi***	43
	2	(United Kingdom) **Jackie Stewart***	27
	3	(New Zealand) **Denny Hulme***	21
	4	(Belgium) **Jacky Ickx***	16
3	5	(United States) **Peter Revson***	10

Constructors' Championship standings

Pos	Constructor	Points
1	(United Kingdom) **Lotus-Ford***	43
2	(United Kingdom) **Tyrrell-Ford***	33
3	(United Kingdom) **McLaren-Ford***	27
4	(Italy) **Ferrari***	20
5	(United Kingdom) **BRM***	9

- Note: Only the top five positions are included for both sets of standings.
- Competitors in bold and marked with an asterisk still had a theoretical chance of becoming World Champion.

Previous race: 1972 French Grand Prix	FIA Formula One World Championship; 1972 season	Next race: 1972 German Grand Prix
Previous race: 1971 British Grand Prix	British Grand Prix	Next race: 1973 British Grand Prix
Previous race: 1968 German Grand Prix	European Grand Prix (Designated European Grand Prix)	Next race: 1973 Belgian Grand Prix
