= 1972 Belgian Grand Prix =

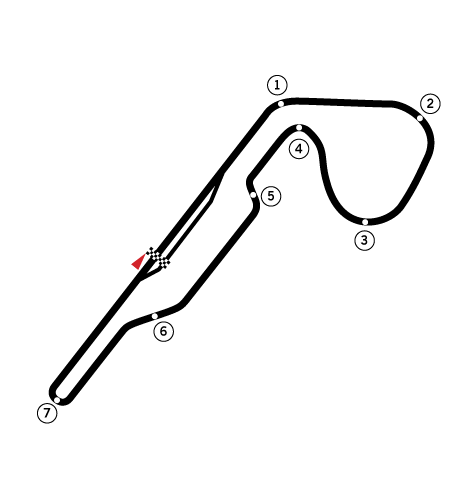

Race details
- Date: June 4, 1972
- Location: Nivelles-Baulers, Nivelles, Belgium
- Course: Permanent racing facility
- Course length: 3.72 km (2.314 miles)
- Distance: 85 laps, 316.2 km (196.69 miles)

Pole position
Driver	(Brazil) Emerson Fittipaldi	Lotus-Ford
- Time: 1:11.43

Fastest lap
Driver	(New Zealand) Chris Amon	Matra
- Time: 1:12.12 on lap 66

Podium
First	(Brazil) Emerson Fittipaldi	Lotus-Ford
Second	(France) François Cevert	Tyrrell-Ford
Third	(New Zealand) Denny Hulme	McLaren-Ford

The 1972 Belgian Grand Prix was a Formula One motor race held at Nivelles on 4 June 1972. It was race 5 of 12 in both the 1972 World Championship of Drivers and the 1972 International Cup for Formula One Manufacturers. The 85-lap race was won by Lotus driver Emerson Fittipaldi after he started from pole position. François Cevert finished second for the Tyrrell team and McLaren driver Denny Hulme came in third.

Reigning World Champion Jackie Stewart was a notable absence – his gruelling schedule of racing in Formula 1, Can-Am and European touring cars, plus promotional events for Tyrrell sponsors Elf and Ford, as well as a sideline of sports commentating on television in the US led to what was originally diagnosed as an ulcer, but was later confirmed as gastritis. Under doctor's orders, he took about three weeks off from everything, canceled his involvement with the Can-Am series and US TV for the remainder of 1972, and was restricting his schedule of everything else.

== Qualifying ==
Qualifying for the 1972 Belgian Grand Prix at the new Nivelles circuit was dominated by Emerson Fittipaldi in the Lotus 72, who set the fastest time and looked clearly superior to the rest of the field, with Clay Regazzoni’s Ferrari and Denny Hulme’s McLaren closest behind and Jean-Pierre Beltoise and Jackie Ickx also competitive.

=== Qualifying classification ===
Pos.	No	Driver	Constructor	Time	Gap
1	32	(Brazil) Emerson Fittipaldi	Lotus-Ford	1:11.43	
2	30	(Switzerland) Clay Regazzoni	Ferrari	1:11.58	+0.15
3	9	(New Zealand) Denny Hulme	McLaren-Ford	1:11.80	+0.37
4	29	(Belgium) Jacky Ickx	Ferrari	1:11.84	+0.41
5	8	(France) François Cevert	Tyrrell-Ford	1:11.93	+0.50
6	23	(France) Jean-Pierre Beltoise	BRM	1:12.12	+0.69
7	10	(United States) Peter Revson	McLaren-Ford	1:12.19	+0.76
8	34	(United Kingdom) Mike Hailwood	Surtees-Ford	1:12.35	+0.92
9	19	(Argentina) Carlos Reutemann	Brabham–Ford	1:12.50	+1.07
10	36	(Italy) Andrea de Adamich	Surtees-Ford	1:12.54	+1.11
11	16	(Brazil) Carlos Pace	March-Ford	1:12.64	+1.21
12	33	(Australia) David Walker	Lotus-Ford	1:12.76	+1.33
13	5	(New Zealand) Chris Amon	Matra	1:12.80	+1.37
14	11	(Sweden) Ronnie Peterson	March-Ford	1:13.00	+1.57
15	25	(New Zealand) Howden Ganley	BRM	1:13.01	+1.58
16	17	(United Kingdom) Graham Hill	Brabham-Ford	1:13.10	+1.67
17	24	(United Kingdom) Peter Gethin	BRM	1:13.15	+1.72
18	18	(Brazil) Wilson Fittipaldi	Brabham-Ford	1:13.20	+1.77
19	15	(France) Henri Pescarolo	March-Ford	1:13.40	+1.97
20	6	(West Germany) Rolf Stommelen	Eifelland-Ford	1:13.43	+2.00
21	35	(Australia) Tim Schenken	Surtees-Ford	1:13.60	+2.17
22	14	(United Kingdom) Mike Beuttler	March-Ford	1:13.70	+2.27
23	27	(Austria) Helmut Marko	BRM	1:14.10	+2.67
24	22	(Italy) Nanni Galli	Tecno	1:14.60	+3.17
25	12	(Austria) Niki Lauda	March-Ford	1:16.50	+5.07
26	26	(Australia) Vern Schuppan	BRM	1:16.90	+5.47

== Race ==
In the race Regazzoni led initially, but Fittipaldi passed him on lap nine and then drove away in complete control to a comfortable victory, confirming his advantage shown in practice. François Cevert finished a strong second for Tyrrell and Hulme took third for McLaren, while the rest of the field was spread out by mechanical problems and attrition, making Fittipaldi’s performance the outstanding feature of both qualifying and the race.

=== Classification ===
Pos	No	Driver	Constructor	Laps	Time/Retired	Grid	Points
1	32	(Brazil) Emerson Fittipaldi	Lotus-Ford	85	1:44:07.3	1	9
2	8	(France) François Cevert	Tyrrell-Ford	85	+ 26.6	5	6
3	9	(New Zealand) Denny Hulme	McLaren-Ford	85	+ 58.1	3	4
4	34	(United Kingdom) Mike Hailwood	Surtees-Ford	85	+ 1:12.0	8	3
5	16	(Brazil) Carlos Pace	March-Ford	84	+ 1 Lap	11	2
6	5	(New Zealand) Chris Amon	Matra	84	+ 1 Lap	13	1
7	10	(United States) Peter Revson	McLaren-Ford	83	+ 2 Laps	7	
8	25	(New Zealand) Howden Ganley	BRM	83	+ 2 Laps	15	
9	11	(Sweden) Ronnie Peterson	March-Ford	83	+ 2 Laps	14	
10	27	(Austria) Helmut Marko	BRM	83	+ 2 Laps	23	
11	6	(Germany) Rolf Stommelen	Eifelland-Ford	83	+ 2 Laps	20	
12	12	(Austria) Niki Lauda	March-Ford	82	+ 3 Laps	25	
13	19	(Argentina) Carlos Reutemann	Brabham-Ford	81	+ 4 Laps	9	
14	33	(Australia) Dave Walker	Lotus-Ford	79	+ 6 Laps	12	
Ret	17	(United Kingdom) Graham Hill	Brabham-Ford	73	Suspension	16	
NC	15	(France) Henri Pescarolo	March-Ford	59	+ 26 Laps	19	
Ret	30	(Switzerland) Clay Regazzoni	Ferrari	57	Accident	2	
Ret	36	(Italy) Andrea de Adamich	Surtees-Ford	55	Engine	10	
Ret	22	(Italy) Nanni Galli	Tecno	54	Accident	24	
Ret	29	(Belgium) Jacky Ickx	Ferrari	47	Injection	4	
Ret	14	(United Kingdom) Mike Beuttler	March-Ford	31	Halfshaft	22	
Ret	18	(Brazil) Wilson Fittipaldi	Brabham-Ford	28	Gearbox	18	
Ret	24	(United Kingdom) Peter Gethin	BRM	27	Fuel Pump	17	
Ret	23	(France) Jean-Pierre Beltoise	BRM	15	Overheating	6	
Ret	35	(Australia) Tim Schenken	Surtees-Ford	11	Overheating	21	
DNS	26	(Australia) Vern Schuppan	BRM		Driven by Marko		

== Notes ==
- This was the Formula One World Championship debut for Australian driver Vern Schuppan.
- This was the 200th Formula One World Championship Grand Prix in which a British driver participated. Of those 200 races, British drivers won 93 Grands Prix, achieved 208 podium finishes, 93 pole positions, 90 fastest laps, 25 Grand Slams and won 8 Driver's World Championships.
- This was the Formula One World Championship debut for Italian engine supplier Tecno.

== Championship standings after the race ==
Drivers' Championship standings

	Pos	Driver	Points
	1	(Brazil) Emerson Fittipaldi	28
1	2	(New Zealand) Denny Hulme	19
1	3	(Belgium) Jacky Ickx	16
	4	(United Kingdom) Jackie Stewart	12
	5	(France) Jean-Pierre Beltoise	9

Constructors' Championship standings

Pos	Constructor	Points
1	(United Kingdom) Lotus-Ford	28
2	(United Kingdom) McLaren-Ford	23
3	(Italy) Ferrari	19
4	(United Kingdom) Tyrrell-Ford	18
5	(United Kingdom) BRM	9

- Note: Only the top five positions are included for both sets of standings.

Previous race: 1972 Monaco Grand Prix	FIA Formula One World Championship; 1972 season	Next race: 1972 French Grand Prix
Previous race: 1970 Belgian Grand Prix	Belgian Grand Prix	Next race: 1973 Belgian Grand Prix
