= 1972 French Grand Prix =

Formula One motor race held in 1972

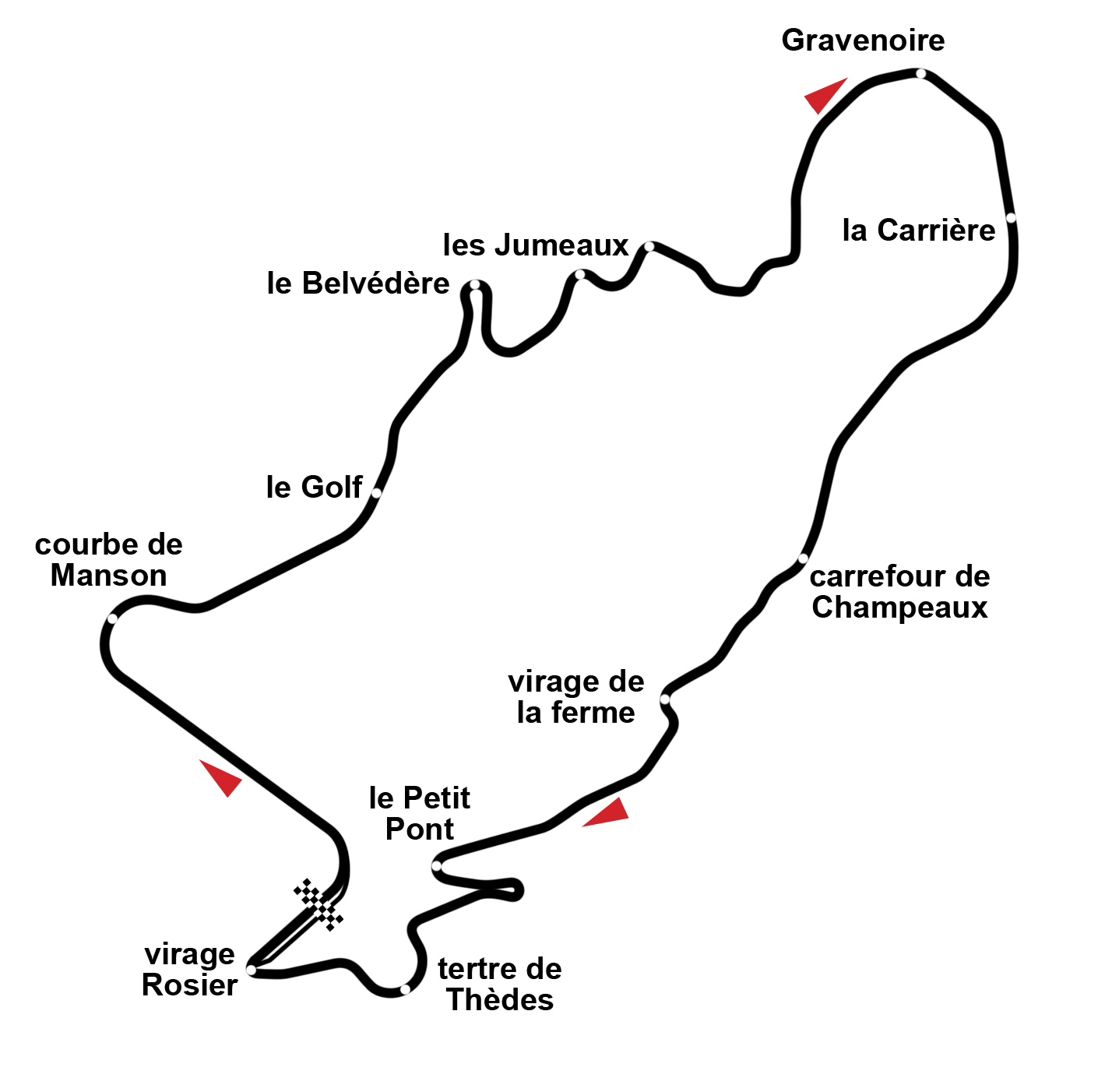

Race details
- Date: 2 July 1972
- Location: Circuit de Charade; Clermont-Ferrand, Auvergne, France
- Course: Temporary street circuit
- Course length: 8.055 km (5.005 miles)
- Distance: 38 laps, 306.09 km (190.19 miles)

Pole position
Driver	(New Zealand) Chris Amon	Matra
- Time: 2:53.4

Fastest lap
Driver	(New Zealand) Chris Amon	Matra
- Time: 2:53.9 on lap 32

Podium
First	(United Kingdom) Jackie Stewart	Tyrrell-Ford
Second	(Brazil) Emerson Fittipaldi	Lotus-Ford
Third	(New Zealand) Chris Amon	Matra

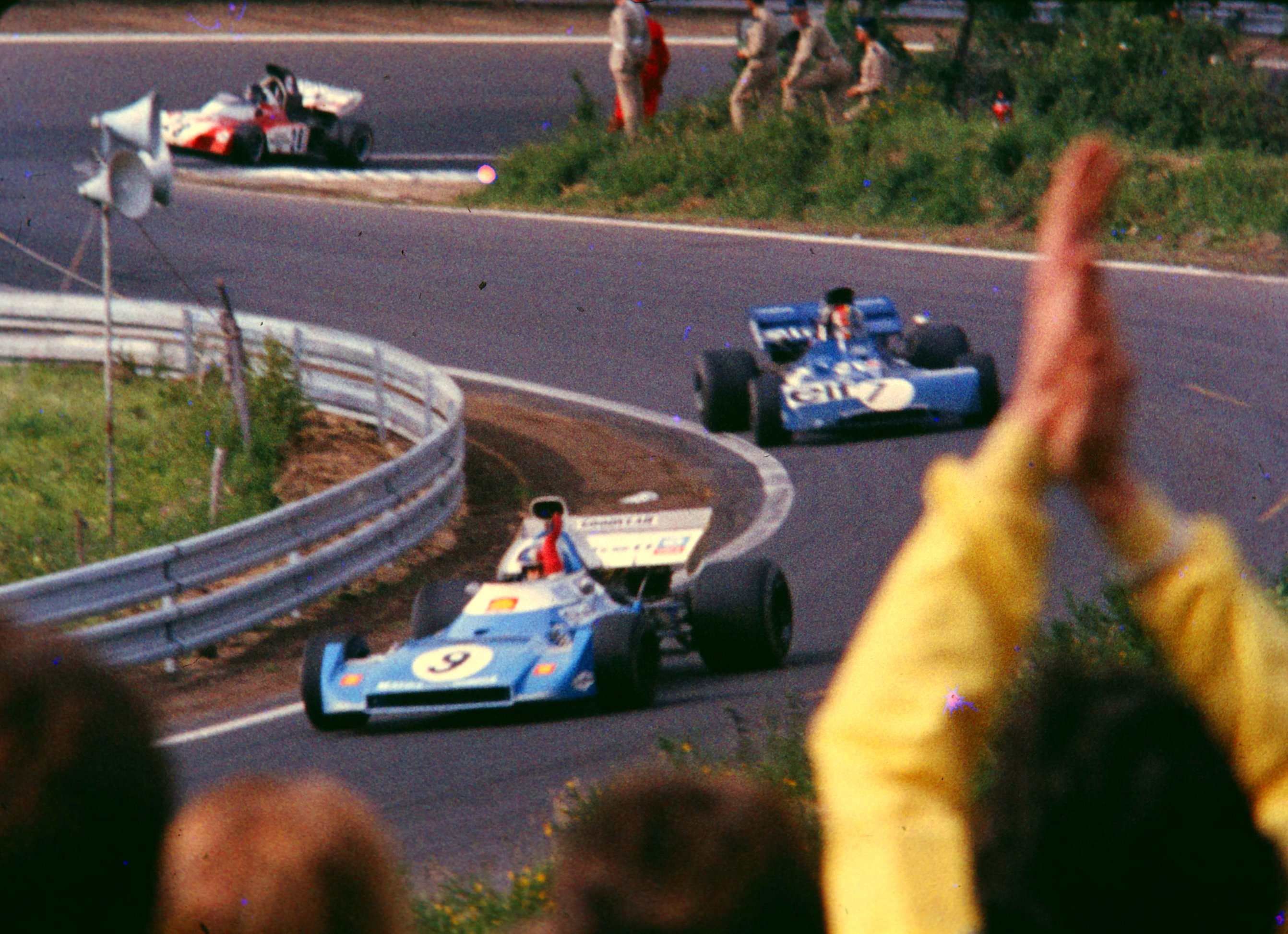
Poleman and third-place finisher Chris Amon in front of fourth place finisher François Cevert

The 1972 French Grand Prix was a Formula One motor race held at the Circuit de Charade in Clermont-Ferrand, Auvergne, France on 2 July 1972. It was race 6 of 12 in both the 1972 World Championship of Drivers and the 1972 International Cup for Formula One Manufacturers.

The Circuit de Charade's natural setting around the base of an extinct volcano created safety concerns due to the dark, volcanic rocks which fell from the mountain onto both sides of the track. Drivers who skirted the track edge would often send rocks flying into the middle of the road and into the way of pursuing competitors. The hazard was highlighted when driver Helmut Marko suffered a career-ending injury during the race, when a stone thrown from Ronnie Peterson's March penetrated his helmet visor and blinded him in the left eye. (Note: Some older sources state that the stone was thrown up by Emerson Fittipaldi's Lotus, but more recent sources indicate that it was thrown up by Ronnie Peterson's March.) The rocks also meant that tyre punctures were a perennial hazard on the circuit, as was shown when ten competitors suffered punctures during the race. The French Grand Prix was moved to the new Circuit Paul Ricard for 1973.

Chris Amon achieved the fifth and final pole position of his career and was leading the race in his Matra until a puncture forced him to pit, leaving Jackie Stewart to win in his Tyrrell-Ford. Emerson Fittipaldi finished second, just ahead of a charging Amon, who shattered the circuit's lap record.

== Qualifying ==
=== Qualifying classification ===
Pos.	No	Driver	Constructor	Time	Gap	Grid
1	9	(New Zealand) Chris Amon	Matra	2:53.4		1
2	2	(New Zealand) Denny Hulme	McLaren-Ford	2:54.2	+0.8	2
3	4	(United Kingdom) Jackie Stewart	Tyrrell-Ford	2:55.0	+1.6	3
4	3	(Belgium) Jacky Ickx	Ferrari	2:55.1	+1.7	4
5	27	(Australia) Tim Schenken	Surtees-Ford	2:57.2	+3.8	5
6	25	(Austria) Helmut Marko	BRM	2:57.3	+3.9	6
7	7	(France) François Cevert	Tyrrell-Ford	2:58.1	+4.7	7
8	1	(Brazil) Emerson Fittipaldi	Lotus-Ford	2:58.1	+4.7	8
9	12	(Sweden) Ronnie Peterson	March-Ford	2:58.2	+4.8	9
10	26	(United Kingdom) Mike Hailwood	Surtees-Ford	2:58.3	+4.9	10
11	17	(Brazil) Carlos Pace	March-Ford	2:58.6	+5.2	11
12	16	(France) Henri Pescarolo	March-Ford	2:59.0	+5.6	DNS
13	28	(Italy) Andrea de Adamich	Surtees-Ford	2:59.1	+5.7	12
14	11	(United Kingdom) Brian Redman	McLaren-Ford	2:59.4	+6.0	13
15	19	(Brazil) Wilson Fittipaldi	Brabham-Ford	2:59.5	+6.1	14
16	10	(Germany) Rolf Stommelen	Eifelland-Ford	2:59.6	+6.2	15
17	8	(France) Patrick Depailler	Tyrrell-Ford	2:59.6	+6.2	16
18	20	(Argentina) Carlos Reutemann	Brabham-Ford	3:00.7	+7.3	17
19	24	(Sweden) Reine Wisell	BRM	3:00.7	+7.3	18
20	30	(Italy) Nanni Galli	Ferrari	3:00.7	+7.3	19
21	23	(New Zealand) Howden Ganley	BRM	3:02.0	+8.6	DNS
22	22	(United Kingdom) Peter Gethin	BRM	3:02.8	+9.4	DNS
23	18	(United Kingdom) Graham Hill	Brabham-Ford	3:03.0	+9.6	20
24	14	(Austria) Niki Lauda	March-Ford	3:03.1	+9.7	21
25	6	(Australia) Dave Walker	Lotus-Ford	3:04.7	+11.3	22
26	15	(United Kingdom) Mike Beuttler	March-Ford	3:05.9	+12.5	23
27	21	(United Kingdom) Derek Bell	Tecno	3:06.9	+13.5	DNS
—	5	(France) Jean-Pierre Beltoise	BRM	no time		24
DNQ	29	(South Africa) Dave Charlton	Lotus-Ford	3:11.6	+18.2	—

== Race ==
=== Classification ===
Pos	No	Driver	Constructor	Laps	Time/Retired	Grid	Points
1	4	(United Kingdom) Jackie Stewart	Tyrrell-Ford	38	1:52:22.5	3	9
2	1	(Brazil) Emerson Fittipaldi	Lotus-Ford	38	+ 27.7	8	6
3	9	(New Zealand) Chris Amon	Matra	38	+ 31.9	1	4
4	7	(France) François Cevert	Tyrrell-Ford	38	+ 49.3	7	3
5	12	(Sweden) Ronnie Peterson	March-Ford	38	+ 56.8	9	2
6	26	(United Kingdom) Mike Hailwood	Surtees-Ford	38	+ 1:36.1	10	1
7	2	(New Zealand) Denny Hulme	McLaren-Ford	38	+ 1:48.1	2	
8	19	(Brazil) Wilson Fittipaldi	Brabham-Ford	38	+ 2:25.1	14	
9	11	(United Kingdom) Brian Redman	McLaren-Ford	38	+ 2:55.5	13	
10	18	(United Kingdom) Graham Hill	Brabham-Ford	38	+ 2:59.5	20	
11	3	(Belgium) Jacky Ickx	Ferrari	37	+ 1 Lap	4	
12	20	(Argentina) Carlos Reutemann	Brabham-Ford	37	+ 1 Lap	17	
13	30	(Italy) Nanni Galli	Ferrari	37	+ 1 Lap	19	
14	28	(Italy) Andrea de Adamich	Surtees-Ford	37	+ 1 Lap	12	
15	5	(France) Jean-Pierre Beltoise	BRM	37	+ 1 Lap	24	
16	10	(Germany) Rolf Stommelen	Eifelland-Ford	37	+ 1 Lap	15	
17	27	(Australia) Tim Schenken	Surtees-Ford	36	+ 2 Laps	5	
18	6	(Australia) Dave Walker	Lotus-Ford	34	Halfshaft	22	
19	15	(United Kingdom) Mike Beuttler	March-Ford	33	Out of Fuel	23	
NC	8	(France) Patrick Depailler	Tyrrell-Ford	33	+ 5 Laps	16	
Ret	24	(Sweden) Reine Wisell	BRM	25	Gearbox	18	
Ret	17	(Brazil) Carlos Pace	March-Ford	18	Engine	11	
Ret	25	(Austria) Helmut Marko	BRM	8	Injury	6	
Ret	14	(Austria) Niki Lauda	March-Ford	4	Halfshaft	21	
DNS	16	(France) Henri Pescarolo	March-Ford		Accident		
DNS	21	(United Kingdom) Derek Bell	Tecno		Transmission		
DNS	22	(United Kingdom) Peter Gethin	BRM		Accident		
DNS	23	(New Zealand) Howden Ganley	BRM		Car raced by Beltoise		
DNQ	29	(South Africa) Dave Charlton	Lotus-Ford				

== Championship standings after the race ==
Drivers' Championship standings

	Pos	Driver	Points
	1	(Brazil) Emerson Fittipaldi	34
2	2	(United Kingdom) Jackie Stewart	21
1	3	(New Zealand) Denny Hulme	19
1	4	(Belgium) Jacky Ickx	16
	5	(France) Jean-Pierre Beltoise	9

Constructors' Championship standings

	Pos	Constructor	Points
	1	(United Kingdom) Lotus-Ford	34
2	2	(United Kingdom) Tyrrell-Ford	27
1	3	(United Kingdom) McLaren-Ford	23
1	4	(Italy) Ferrari	19
	5	(United Kingdom) BRM	9

- Note: Only the top five positions are included for both sets of standings.

== Notes ==
- This was the Formula One World Championship debut for French driver and future Grand Prix winner Patrick Depailler.
- This was the 5th pole position and 10th fastest lap set by a New Zealand driver.

== Additional notes ==
Previous race: 1972 Belgian Grand Prix	FIA Formula One World Championship; 1972 season	Next race: 1972 British Grand Prix
Previous race: 1971 French Grand Prix	French Grand Prix	Next race: 1973 French Grand Prix
