= 1973 Belgian Grand Prix =

Race details
- Date: 20 May 1973
- Official name: XXXI GROTE PRIJS VAN BELGIE
- Location: Circuit Zolder; Heusden-Zolder, Limburg, Belgium
- Course: Grand Prix Circuit
- Course length: 4.220 km (2.622 miles)
- Distance: 70 laps, 295.379 km (183.540 miles)
- Weather: Warm, dry

Pole position
Driver	(Sweden) Ronnie Peterson	Lotus-Ford
- Time: 1:22.46

Fastest lap
Driver	(France) François Cevert	Tyrrell-Ford
- Time: 1:25.42 on lap 28

Podium
First	(United Kingdom) Jackie Stewart	Tyrrell-Ford
Second	(France) François Cevert	Tyrrell-Ford
Third	(Brazil) Emerson Fittipaldi	Lotus-Ford

The 1973 Belgian Grand Prix was a Formula One motor race held at Zolder on 20 May 1973. It was race 5 of 15 in both the 1973 World Championship of Drivers and the 1973 International Cup for Formula One Manufacturers. The race was won by British driver Jackie Stewart driving a Tyrrell 006.

The entire Zolder track had to be resurfaced a week before the actual Grand Prix after a few drivers such as Jackie Stewart, Emerson Fittipaldi and François Cevert walked around the track to inspect it. They found that the track started to break up as a result of a previous race, and the track owners immediately decided to resurface the track, only a week before the Grand Prix. Cevert, Fittipaldi and Stewart refused to drive on the track because of the danger, and Cevert responded to the FIA that they would attempt to cancel the race if the owners did not do a good enough job of fixing the track.

Future world champion Niki Lauda took his first ever career points here, by finishing in fifth place in his BRM.

This race saw the end of teams' numbers changing from race to race - the numbers teams raced with at Zolder lasted until the end of the season. For the 1974 season, the finishing positions in the 1973 Constructors' Championship were used to allocate the numbers, after which teams did not change numbers unless they won the Drivers' Championship (or signed the current World Champion).

== Qualifying ==
=== Qualifying classification ===
Pos.	Driver	Constructor	Time	No
1	(Sweden) Ronnie Peterson	Lotus-Ford	1:22.46	1
2	(New Zealand) Denny Hulme	McLaren-Ford	1:23.00	2
3	(Belgium) Jacky Ickx	Ferrari	1:23.10	3
4	(France) François Cevert	Tyrrell-Ford	1:23.22	4
5	(France) Jean-Pierre Beltoise	BRM	1:23.25	5
6	(United Kingdom) Jackie Stewart	Tyrrell-Ford	1:23.28	6
7	(Argentina) Carlos Reutemann	Brabham-Ford	1:23.34	7
8	(Brazil) Carlos Pace	Surtees-Ford	1:23.34	8
9	(Brazil) Emerson Fittipaldi	Lotus-Ford	1:23.44	9
10	(United States) Peter Revson	McLaren-Ford	1:23.52	10
11	(United States) George Follmer	Shadow-Ford	1:23.86	11
12	(Switzerland) Clay Regazzoni	BRM	1:23.91	12
13	(United Kingdom) Mike Hailwood	Surtees-Ford	1:23.96	13
14	(Austria) Niki Lauda	BRM	1:24.51	14
15	(New Zealand) Chris Amon	Tecno	1:24.79	15
16	(France) Jean-Pierre Jarier	March-Ford	1:24.83	16
17	(Italy) Nanni Galli	Iso-Marlboro-Ford	1:24.89	17
18	(Italy) Andrea de Adamich	Brabham-Ford	1:25.28	18
19	(Brazil) Wilson Fittipaldi	Brabham-Ford	1:25.57	19
20	(United Kingdom) Mike Beuttler	March-Ford	1:25.77	20
21	(New Zealand) Howden Ganley	Iso-Marlboro-Ford	1:26.68	21
22	(United Kingdom) Jackie Oliver	Shadow-Ford	1:28.12	22
23	(United Kingdom) Graham Hill	Shadow-Ford	1:30.45	23

== Race ==
=== Classification ===
Pos	No	Driver	Constructor	Laps	Time/Retired	Grid	Points
1	5	(United Kingdom) Jackie Stewart	Tyrrell-Ford	70	1:42:13.43	6	9
2	6	(France) François Cevert	Tyrrell-Ford	70	+ 31.84	4	6
3	1	(Brazil) Emerson Fittipaldi	Lotus-Ford	70	+ 2:02.79	9	4
4	9	(Italy) Andrea de Adamich	Brabham-Ford	69	+ 1 Lap	18	3
5	21	(Austria) Niki Lauda	BRM	69	+ 1 Lap	14	2
6	22	(New Zealand) Chris Amon	Tecno	67	+ 3 Laps	15	1
7	7	(New Zealand) Denny Hulme	McLaren-Ford	67	+3 Laps	2	
8	24	(Brazil) Carlos Pace	Surtees-Ford	66	+4 Laps	8	
9	12	(United Kingdom) Graham Hill	Shadow-Ford	65	+5 Laps	23	
10	19	(Switzerland) Clay Regazzoni	BRM	63	Accident	12	
11	15	(United Kingdom) Mike Beuttler	March-Ford	63	Accident	20	
Ret	14	(France) Jean-Pierre Jarier	March-Ford	60	Accident	16	
Ret	20	(France) Jean-Pierre Beltoise	BRM	56	Not classified	5	
Ret	11	(Brazil) Wilson Fittipaldi	Brabham-Ford	46	Engine	19	
Ret	2	(Sweden) Ronnie Peterson	Lotus-Ford	42	Accident	1	
Ret	8	(United States) Peter Revson	McLaren-Ford	33	Accident	10	
Ret	25	(New Zealand) Howden Ganley	Iso-Marlboro-Ford	16	Accident	21	
Ret	10	(Argentina) Carlos Reutemann	Brabham-Ford	14	Engine	7	
Ret	16	(United States) George Follmer	Shadow-Ford	13	Throttle	11	
Ret	17	(United Kingdom) Jackie Oliver	Shadow-Ford	11	Accident	22	
Ret	3	(Belgium) Jacky Ickx	Ferrari	6	Oil pump	3	
Ret	26	(Italy) Nanni Galli	Iso-Marlboro-Ford	6	Engine	17	
Ret	23	(United Kingdom) Mike Hailwood	Surtees-Ford	4	Accident	13	

== Notes ==
- This was the 50th race in which a Brazilian driver participated.
- This race marked the 24th and 25th podium finish for British constructor Tyrrell.
- This was the 50th pole position for a Ford-powered car.

== Championship standings after the race ==
Drivers' Championship standings

Pos	Driver	Points
1	(Brazil) Emerson Fittipaldi	35
2	(United Kingdom) Jackie Stewart	28
3	(France) François Cevert	18
4	(United States) Peter Revson	9
5	(New Zealand) Denny Hulme	9

Constructors' Championship standings

	Pos	Constructor	Points
1	1	(United Kingdom) Tyrrell-Ford	36
1	2	(United Kingdom) Lotus-Ford	35
	3	(United Kingdom) McLaren-Ford	15
	4	(Italy) Ferrari	9
	5	(United Kingdom) Shadow-Ford	5

- Note: Only the top five positions are included for both sets of standings.

Previous race: 1973 Spanish Grand Prix	FIA Formula One World Championship; 1973 season	Next race: 1973 Monaco Grand Prix
Previous race: 1972 Belgian Grand Prix	Belgian Grand Prix	Next race: 1974 Belgian Grand Prix
Previous race: 1972 British Grand Prix	European Grand Prix (Designated European Grand Prix)	Next race: 1974 German Grand Prix
