= 1970 Mexican Grand Prix =

- The Ciudad Deportiva Magdalena Mixhuca

Race details
- Date: October 25, 1970
- Official name: Mexican Grand Prix
- Location: Ciudad Deportiva Magdalena Mixhuca, Mexico City, Mexico
- Course: Permanent racing facility
- Course length: 5.000 km (3.107 miles)
- Distance: 65 laps, 325.000 km (201.946 miles)

Pole position
Driver	(Switzerland) Clay Regazzoni	Ferrari
- Time: 1:41.86

Fastest lap
Driver	(Belgium) Jacky Ickx	Ferrari
- Time: 1:43.11 on lap 46

Podium
First	(Belgium) Jacky Ickx	Ferrari
Second	(Switzerland) Clay Regazzoni	Ferrari
Third	(New Zealand) Denny Hulme	McLaren-Ford

The 1970 Mexican Grand Prix was a Formula One motor race held at the Ciudad Deportiva Magdalena Mixhuca in Mexico City on October 25, 1970. It was race 13 of 13 in both the 1970 World Championship of Drivers and the 1970 International Cup for Formula One Manufacturers. The 65-lap race was won by Ferrari driver Jacky Ickx after he started from third position. His teammate Clay Regazzoni finished second and McLaren driver Denny Hulme came in third.

Ickx need to win all three remaining races of the season following Monza (Canada, USA, Mexico) in order to close the points gap to the late Jochen Rindt, but could not because Rindt's team scored an emotional victory at the previous round at Watkins Glen with Emerson Fittipaldi while Ickx finished 4th. As a result, Rindt became the first Austrian Formula One World Champion and the only driver ever to win the championship posthumously.

== Qualifying classification ==
Pos	No	Driver	Constructor	Time	Gap	Grid
1	4	(Switzerland) Clay Regazzoni	Ferrari	1:41.86	—	1
2	1	(United Kingdom) Jackie Stewart	Tyrrell-Ford	1:41.88	+0.02	2
3	3	(Belgium) Jacky Ickx	Ferrari	1:42.41	+0.55	3
4	15	(Australia) Jack Brabham	Brabham-Ford	1:43.57	+1.71	4
5	12	(New Zealand) Chris Amon	March-Ford	1:43.71	+1.85	5
6	6	(France) Jean-Pierre Beltoise	Matra	1:43.82	+1.96	6
7	19	(Mexico) Pedro Rodríguez	BRM	1:44.01	+2.15	7
8	14	(United Kingdom) Graham Hill	Lotus-Ford	1:44.13	+2.27	8
9	2	(France) François Cevert	March-Ford	1:44.21	+2.35	9
10	9	(United Kingdom) Peter Gethin	McLaren-Ford	1:44.46	+2.60	10
11	7	(France) Henri Pescarolo	Matra	1:44.55	+2.69	11
12	23	(Sweden) Reine Wisell	Lotus-Ford	1:44.59	+2.73	12
13	20	(United Kingdom) Jackie Oliver	BRM	1:44.70	+2.84	13
14	8	(New Zealand) Denny Hulme	McLaren-Ford	1:44.95	+3.09	14
15	17	(United Kingdom) John Surtees	Surtees-Ford	1:45.03	+3.17	15
16	11	(Switzerland) Jo Siffert	March-Ford	1:46.15	+4.29	16
17	16	(Germany) Rolf Stommelen	Brabham-Ford	1:46.30	+4.44	17
18	24	(Brazil) Emerson Fittipaldi	Lotus-Ford	1:48.13	+6.27	18

== Race report ==
The race was originally scheduled to start at 2:30pm but the crowd of 200,000 was difficult to control and almost forced the cancellation of the race. They were crammed in front of the guard-rails, sat at the trackside and ran across the track itself. Despite appeals from Jackie Stewart and local hero Pedro Rodríguez they still remained troublesome. It cause the start to be delayed to 4:00pm.

From the start, Jacky Ickx led from Stewart and Clay Regazzoni, but dropped back with steering column trouble. Later, a collision with a dog which had escaped onto the track damaged Stewart's suspension and forced his retirement, leaving the Ferraris dominant in first and second. Jack Brabham retired from third place in his final Grand Prix when the engine blew on lap 53. The Ferraris romped home with Ickx leading Regazzoni and Denny Hulme claiming the third podium spot.

The crowd control issues led to the Mexican Grand Prix being dropped from the 1971 calendar. It returned to the Formula One calendar fifteen years later in 1986.

== Race classification ==
Pos	No	Driver	Constructor	Laps	Time/Retired	Grid	Points
1	3	(Belgium) Jacky Ickx	Ferrari	65	1:53:28.36	3	9
2	4	(Switzerland) Clay Regazzoni	Ferrari	65	+ 24.64	1	6
3	8	(New Zealand) Denny Hulme	McLaren-Ford	65	+ 45.97	14	4
4	12	(New Zealand) Chris Amon	March-Ford	65	+ 47.05	5	3
5	6	(France) Jean-Pierre Beltoise	Matra	65	+ 50.11	6	2
6	19	(Mexico) Pedro Rodriguez	BRM	65	+ 1:24.76	7	1
7	20	(United Kingdom) Jackie Oliver	BRM	64	+ 1 lap	13	
8	17	(United Kingdom) John Surtees	Surtees-Ford	64	+ 1 lap	15	
9	7	(France) Henri Pescarolo	Matra	61	+ 4 laps	11	
NC	23	(Sweden) Reine Wisell	Lotus-Ford	56	+ 9 laps	12	
Ret	15	(Australia) Jack Brabham	Brabham-Ford	52	Engine	4	
Ret	1	(United Kingdom) Jackie Stewart	Tyrrell-Ford	33	Suspension	2	
Ret	9	(United Kingdom) Peter Gethin	McLaren-Ford	27	Engine	10	
Ret	16	(Germany) Rolf Stommelen	Brabham-Ford	15	Fuel system	17	
Ret	2	(France) François Cevert	March-Ford	8	Engine	9	
Ret	14	(United Kingdom) Graham Hill	Lotus-Ford	4	Overheating	8	
Ret	11	(Switzerland) Jo Siffert	March-Ford	3	Engine	16	
Ret	24	(Brazil) Emerson Fittipaldi	Lotus-Ford	1	Engine	18	

== Notes ==
- This was the 10th podium finish for a Swiss driver.
- This was the 50th fastest lap set by a Ferrari (as a constructor and as an engine supplier); a record.
- This race marked the 126th and last Grand Prix start for Jack Brabham; a record that would be broken by Graham Hill at the 1971 Monaco Grand Prix.

== Final championship standings ==
Drivers' Championship standings

	Pos	Driver	Points
	1	(Austria) **Jochen Rindt**	45
	2	(Belgium) Jacky Ickx	40
	3	(Switzerland) Clay Regazzoni	33
2	4	(New Zealand) Denny Hulme	27
1	5	(United Kingdom) Jackie Stewart	25

Constructors' Championship standings

Pos	Constructor	Points
1	(United Kingdom) **Lotus-Ford**	59
2	(Italy) Ferrari	52 (55)
3	(United Kingdom) March-Ford	48
4	(United Kingdom) Brabham-Ford	35
5	(United Kingdom) McLaren-Ford	35

- Note: Only the top five positions are included for both sets of standings. Only the best 6 results from the first 7 rounds and the best 5 results from the last 6 rounds counted towards the Championship. Numbers without parentheses are Championship points; numbers in parentheses are total points scored.
- Competitors in bold are the 1970 World Champions.

Previous race: 1970 United States Grand Prix	FIA Formula One World Championship; 1970 season	Next race: 1971 South African Grand Prix
Previous race: 1969 Mexican Grand Prix	Mexican Grand Prix	Next race: 1986 Mexican Grand Prix
