= 1972 South African Grand Prix =

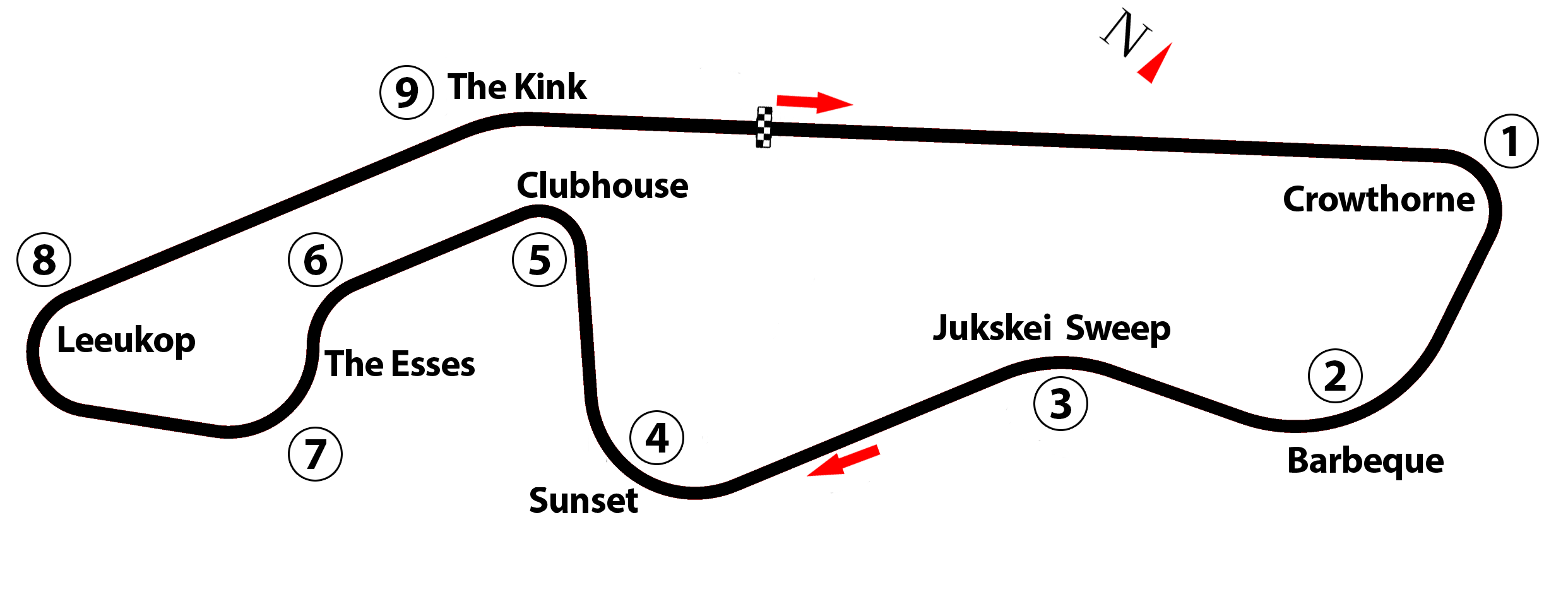
- The Kyalami Circuit (1967–1985)

Race details
- Date: 4 March 1972
- Official name: Sixth AA Grand Prix of South Africa
- Location: Kyalami, Midrand, Transvaal Province, South Africa
- Course: Permanent racing facility
- Course length: 4.104 km (2.550 miles)
- Distance: 79 laps, 324.216 km (201.458 miles)
- Weather: Sunny, Hot, Dry

Pole position
Driver	(United Kingdom) Jackie Stewart	Tyrrell-Ford
- Time: 1:17.0

Fastest lap
Driver	(United Kingdom) Mike Hailwood	Surtees-Ford
- Time: 1:18.9

Podium
First	(New Zealand) Denny Hulme	McLaren-Ford
Second	(Brazil) Emerson Fittipaldi	Lotus-Ford
Third	(United States) Peter Revson	McLaren-Ford

The 1972 South African Grand Prix, formally the Sixth AA Grand Prix of South Africa (Afrikaans: Sesde AA Suid-Afrikaanse Grand Prix), was a Formula One motor race held at Kyalami on 4 March 1972. It was race 2 of 12 in both the 1972 World Championship of Drivers and the 1972 International Cup for Formula One Manufacturers. The 79-lap race was won by McLaren driver Denny Hulme after he started from fifth position. Emerson Fittipaldi finished second for the Lotus team and McLaren driver Peter Revson came in third.

== Report ==
=== Entry ===
A total of 27 cars were entered for this race. Although there was more than a month between the Argentine Grand Prix and South Africa, most cars were transported direct to Kyalami from Buenos Aires. There were few changes in the entry.

Having missed the trip to Argentina due to a clashing Formula 5000 race, Mike Hailwood returned to Team Surtees. Jean-Pierre Beltoise also missed Buenos Aires, due to legal problems following an accident that had claimed the life of Ignazio Giunti in January 1971. Team Williams ran a second March-Cosworth for rising star Carlos Pace alongside their regular driver, Henri Pescarolo. A new team arrived in South Africa, the Team Eifelland Caravans outfit making its first appearance with Rolf Stommelen down to drive. As usual for Kyalami, the field was bolstered by local entries: Dave Charlton in a Lucky Strike-sponsored Lotus 72D, and pair of cars from Team Gunston for John Love (Surtees TS9) and Willie Ferguson (Brabham BT33).

=== Qualifying ===
The reigning World Champion, and winner of the opening round, Jackie Stewart secured pole position, for Elf Team Tyrrell, averaging a speed of 119.221 mph. Stewart beat Clay Regazzoni (Ferrari) and Emerson Fittipaldi (Lotus) by a few tenth of a second. Mike Hailwood was next up on the second row, joined by Denny Hulme in his McLaren M19A. A pair of Ferrari 312B2 were on row three, with Mario Andretti ahead of Jacky Ickx. They were joined by François Cevert in the second Tyrrell.

=== Race ===
The race was held over 79 laps of the Kyalami circuit. At the start, Denny Hulme briefly held the lead before Jackie Stewart moved ahead, meanwhile Clay Regazzoni had a bad get away and was back in the midfield. The Tyrrell 003 of Stewart quickly built a lead while the battle for second between Hulme, Emerson Fittipaldi and Mike Hailwood detached itself from the rest of the field. The Yardley Team McLaren of Hulme began to overheat and this saw him dropped behind his rivals. Hailwood, a few laps later, was able to pass Fittipaldi to move up to second and began to challenge Stewart for the lead. On lap 28, the rear suspension of Hailwood's Surtees TS9B failed and he retired from the race. Although this left Fittipaldi to attack Stewart, the Tyrrell driver stayed ahead, only to suffer a gearbox failure on lap 45. Fittipaldi inherited the lead, with Hulme right on his tail. The Brazilian now ran into handling problems and this enable Hulme to regain the lead on lap 57, from which he would go to win. Fittipaldi was still in a strong second place as the gap between him and the third place, Chris Amon was large. The gap became even bigger where Amon's Matra MS120C developed a serious vibration. This saw him drop down the order and finish 3 laps adrift in 15th. Third place thus went to the second McLaren, of Peter Revson.

Hulme won in a time of 1hr 45.49.1mins., averaging a speed of 114.898 mph, and was over 14 seconds ahead of Fititpaldi. Revson was a further 12.7 seconds behind. Only other drivers to complete the full race distance were Mario Andretti (Ferrari) and Ronnie Peterson (March). This victory gave Hulme a six-point the lead in the World Championship.

== Classification ==
=== Qualifying ===
Pos.	No.	Driver	Constructor	Time	Gap
1	1	(United Kingdom) Jackie Stewart	Tyrrell–Ford	1:17.0	
2	6	(Switzerland) Clay Regazzoni	Ferrari	1:17.3	+0.3
3	8	(Brazil) Emerson Fittipaldi	Lotus–Ford	1:17.4	+0.4
4	17	(United Kingdom) Mike Hailwood	Surtees–Ford	1:17.4	+0.4
5	12	(New Zealand) Denny Hulme	McLaren–Ford	1:17.4	+0.4
6	7	(United States) Mario Andretti	Ferrari	1:17.5	+0.5
7	5	(Belgium) Jacky Ickx	Ferrari	1:17.7	+0.7
8	2	(France) François Cevert	Tyrrell–Ford	1:17.8	+0.8
9	3	(Sweden) Ronnie Peterson	March–Ford	1:17.8	+0.8
10	16	(Australia) Tim Schenken	Surtees–Ford	1:17.8	+0.8
11	10	(France) Jean-Pierre Beltoise	BRM	1:17.9	+0.9
12	14	(United States) Peter Revson	McLaren–Ford	1:18.0	+1.0
13	15	(New Zealand) Chris Amon	Matra	1:18.0	+1.0
14	19	(United Kingdom) Graham Hill	Brabham–Ford	1:18.1	+1.1
15	20	(Argentina) Carlos Reutemann	Brabham–Ford	1:18.2	+1.2
16	23	(New Zealand) Howden Ganley	BRM	1:18.3	+1.3
17	26	(South Africa) David Charlton	Lotus–Ford	1:18.5	+1.5
18	11	(United Kingdom) Peter Gethin	BRM	1:18.7	+1.7
19	9	(Australia) David Walker	Lotus–Ford	1:18.7	+1.7
20	18	(Italy) Andrea de Adamich	Surtees–Ford	1:18.9	+1.9
21	4	(Austria) Niki Lauda	March–Ford	1:18.9	+1.9
22	21	(France) Henri Pescarolo	March–Ford	1:19.0	+2.0
23	24	(Austria) Helmut Marko	BRM	1:19.1	+2.1
24	22	(Brazil) Carlos Pace	March–Ford	1:20.3	+3.3
25	25	(West Germany) Rolf Stommelen	Eifelland–Ford	1:20.4	+3.4
26	27	(Rhodesia) John Love	Surtees–Ford	1:21.0	+4.0
27	28	(South Africa) William Ferguson	Brabham–Ford	1:31.9	+14.9

=== Race ===
Pos	No	Driver	Constructor	Laps	Time/Retired	Grid	Points
1	12	(New Zealand) Denny Hulme	McLaren-Ford	79	1:45:49.1	5	9
2	8	(Brazil) Emerson Fittipaldi	Lotus-Ford	79	+ 14.1	3	6
3	14	(United States) Peter Revson	McLaren-Ford	79	+ 25.8	12	4
4	7	(United States) Mario Andretti	Ferrari	79	+ 38.5	6	3
5	3	(Sweden) Ronnie Peterson	March-Ford	79	+ 49.0	9	2
6	19	(United Kingdom) Graham Hill	Brabham-Ford	78	+ 1 Lap	14	1
7	4	(Austria) Niki Lauda	March-Ford	78	+ 1 Lap	21	
8	5	(Belgium) Jacky Ickx	Ferrari	78	+ 1 Lap	7	
9	2	(France) François Cevert	Tyrrell-Ford	78	+ 1 Lap	8	
10	9	(Australia) Dave Walker	Lotus-Ford	78	+ 1 Lap	19	
11	21	(France) Henri Pescarolo	March-Ford	78	+ 1 Lap	22	
12	6	(Switzerland) Clay Regazzoni	Ferrari	77	+ 2 Laps	2	
13	25	(Germany) Rolf Stommelen	Eifelland-Ford	77	+ 2 Laps	25	
14	24	(Austria) Helmut Marko	BRM	76	+ 3 Laps	23	
15	15	(New Zealand) Chris Amon	Matra	76	+ 3 Laps	13	
16	27	(Rhodesia) John Love	Surtees-Ford	73	Puncture / Accident	26	
17	22	(Brazil) Carlos Pace	March-Ford	73	+ 6 Laps	24	
NC	23	(New Zealand) Howden Ganley	BRM	70	+ 9 Laps	16	
NC	18	(Italy) Andrea de Adamich	Surtees-Ford	69	+ 10 Laps	20	
NC	11	(United Kingdom) Peter Gethin	BRM	65	+ 14 Laps	18	
Ret	10	(France) Jean-Pierre Beltoise	BRM	61	Engine	11	
Ret	1	(United Kingdom) Jackie Stewart	Tyrrell-Ford	45	Gearbox	1	
Ret	17	(United Kingdom) Mike Hailwood	Surtees-Ford	28	Suspension	4	
Ret	20	(Argentina) Carlos Reutemann	Brabham-Ford	27	Fuel System	15	
Ret	16	(Australia) Tim Schenken	Surtees-Ford	9	Engine	10	
Ret	26	(South Africa) Dave Charlton	Lotus-Ford	2	Fuel Pump	17	
DNS	28	(South Africa) William Ferguson	Brabham-Ford		Engine		

== Notes ==
- This was the Formula One World Championship debut for South African driver William Ferguson and for Brazilian driver and future Grand Prix winner Carlos Pace.
- This race marked the 10th Grand Prix win for a New Zealand driver and the 5th podium finish for a Brazilian driver.
- First podium finish for Peter Revson.
- This was the Formula One World Championship debut for German constructor Eifelland.
- This was the 1st fastest lap set by a Surtees.
- This race marked the 5th Grand Prix win for McLaren.

== Championship standings after the race ==
Drivers' Championship standings

	Pos	Driver	Points
1	1	(New Zealand) Denny Hulme	15
1	2	(United Kingdom) Jackie Stewart	9
9	3	(Brazil) Emerson Fittipaldi	6
1	4	(Belgium) Jacky Ickx	4
7	5	(United States) Peter Revson	4

Constructors' Championship standings

	Pos	Constructor	Points
1	1	(United Kingdom) McLaren-Ford	15
1	2	(United Kingdom) Tyrrell-Ford	9
	3	(Italy) Ferrari	7
4	4	(United Kingdom) Lotus-Ford	6
	5	(United Kingdom) March-Ford	3

- Note: Only the top five positions are included for both sets of standings.

Previous race: 1972 Argentine Grand Prix	FIA Formula One World Championship; 1972 season	Next race: 1972 Spanish Grand Prix
Previous race: 1971 South African Grand Prix	South African Grand Prix	Next race: 1973 South African Grand Prix
