= 1973 Monaco Grand Prix =

Coordinates: 43°44′4.74″N 7°25′16.8″E

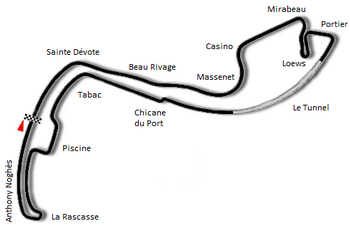
- Circuit de Monaco

Race details
- Date: 3 June 1973
- Official name: XXXI Grand Prix de Monaco
- Location: Monte Carlo, Monaco
- Course: Street circuit
- Course length: 3.278 km (2.037 miles)
- Distance: 78 laps, 255.684 km (158.886 miles)

Pole position
Driver	(United Kingdom) Jackie Stewart	Tyrrell-Ford
- Time: 1:27.5

Fastest lap
Driver	(Brazil) Emerson Fittipaldi	Lotus-Ford
- Time: 1:28.1 on lap 78

Podium
First	(United Kingdom) Jackie Stewart	Tyrrell-Ford
Second	(Brazil) Emerson Fittipaldi	Lotus-Ford
Third	(Sweden) Ronnie Peterson	Lotus-Ford

The 1973 Monaco Grand Prix was a Formula One motor race held at Monaco on 3 June 1973. It was race 6 of 15 in both the 1973 World Championship of Drivers and the 1973 International Cup for Formula One Manufacturers.

The race was held on a heavily revised circuit, with a longer tunnel, a new section of track around the new swimming pool on the harbour front, and the Gasworks hairpin replaced by the Rascasse and Antony Noghès corners, the latter named after the founder of the race. The pits were also moved back to the start-finish straight, on a wider pit lane.

The 78-lap race was won from pole position by Scotland's Jackie Stewart, driving a Tyrrell-Ford. In the process, Stewart equalled the record of 25 Grand Prix victories set by his friend Jim Clark. Brazil's Emerson Fittipaldi finished second in a Lotus-Ford, with Swedish teammate Ronnie Peterson third.

This was the first race for future World Champion James Hunt, driving a March-Ford entered by Hesketh Racing. Hunt suffered an engine failure in the closing stages of the race, but was classified ninth.

== Qualifying ==
=== Qualifying classification ===
Pos.	Driver	Constructor	Time	No
1	Jackie Stewart	Tyrrell-Ford	1:27.5	1
2	Ronnie Peterson	Lotus-Ford	1:27.7	2
3	Denis Hulme	McLaren-Ford	1:27.8	3
4	François Cevert	Tyrrell-Ford	1:27.9	4
5	Emerson Fittipaldi	Lotus-Ford	1:28.1	5
6	Niki Lauda	BRM	1:28.5	6
7	Jacky Ickx	Ferrari	1:28.7	7
8	Clay Regazzoni	BRM	1:28.9	8
9	Wilson Fittipaldi	Brabham-Ford	1:28.9	9
10	Howden Ganley	Iso-Ford	1:29.0	10
11	Jean-Pierre Beltoise	BRM	1:29.0	11
12	Chris Amon	Tecno	1:29.3	12
13	Mike Hailwood	Surtees-Ford	1:29.4	13
14	Jean-Pierre Jarier	March-Ford	1:29.4	14
15	Peter Revson	McLaren-Ford	1:29.4	15
16	Arturo Merzario	Ferrari	1:29.5	16
17	Carlos Pace	Surtees-Ford	1:29.6	17
18	James Hunt	March-Ford	1:29.9	18
19	Carlos Reutemann	Brabham-Ford	1:30.1	19
20	George Follmer	Shadow-Ford	1:30.4	DNS
21	Mike Beuttler	March-Ford	1:31.0	20
22	Nanni Galli	Iso-Ford	1:31.1	21
23	Jackie Oliver	Shadow-Ford	1:31.2	22
24	David Purley	March-Ford	1:31.9	23
25	Graham Hill	Shadow-Ford	1:31.9	24
26	Andrea de Adamich	Brabham-Ford	1:32.1	25

== Race ==
=== Classification ===
Pos	No	Driver	Constructor	Laps	Time/Retired	Grid	Points
1	5	(United Kingdom) Jackie Stewart	Tyrrell-Ford	78	1:57:44.3	1	9
2	1	(Brazil) Emerson Fittipaldi	Lotus-Ford	78	+ 1.3	5	6
3	2	(Sweden) Ronnie Peterson	Lotus-Ford	77	+ 1 Lap	2	4
4	6	(France) François Cevert	Tyrrell-Ford	77	+ 1 Lap	4	3
5	8	(United States) Peter Revson	McLaren-Ford	76	+ 2 Laps	15	2
6	7	(New Zealand) Denny Hulme	McLaren-Ford	76	+ 2 Laps	3	1
7	9	(Italy) Andrea de Adamich	Brabham-Ford	75	+ 3 Laps	25	
8	23	(United Kingdom) Mike Hailwood	Surtees-Ford	75	+ 3 Laps	13	
9	27	(United Kingdom) James Hunt	March-Ford	73	Engine	18	
10	17	(United Kingdom) Jackie Oliver	Shadow-Ford	72	+ 6 Laps	22	
11	11	(Brazil) Wilson Fittipaldi	Brabham-Ford	71	Fuel System	9	
Ret	14	(France) Jean-Pierre Jarier	March-Ford	67	Gearbox	14	
Ret	12	(United Kingdom) Graham Hill	Shadow-Ford	62	Suspension	24	
Ret	4	(Italy) Arturo Merzario	Ferrari	58	Oil Pressure	16	
Ret	10	(Argentina) Carlos Reutemann	Brabham-Ford	46	Gearbox	19	
Ret	3	(Belgium) Jacky Ickx	Ferrari	44	Halfshaft	7	
Ret	25	(New Zealand) Howden Ganley	Iso-Marlboro-Ford	41	Halfshaft	10	
Ret	20	(France) Jean-Pierre Beltoise	BRM	39	Accident	11	
Ret	24	(Brazil) Carlos Pace	Surtees-Ford	31	Halfshaft	17	
Ret	18	(United Kingdom) David Purley	March-Ford	31	Fuel Leak	23	
Ret	26	(Italy) Nanni Galli	Iso-Marlboro-Ford	30	Halfshaft	21	
Ret	21	(Austria) Niki Lauda	BRM	24	Gearbox	6	
Ret	22	(New Zealand) Chris Amon	Tecno	22	Overheating	12	
Ret	19	(Switzerland) Clay Regazzoni	BRM	15	Brakes	8	
Ret	15	(United Kingdom) Mike Beuttler	March-Ford	3	Engine	20	
DNS	16	(United States) George Follmer	Shadow-Ford		Practice Accident		

== Notes ==
- This was the Formula One World Championship debut for British drivers David Purley and future World Champion James Hunt.
- This was the 10th pole position for Tyrrell.

== Championship standings after the race ==
Drivers' Championship standings

Pos	Driver	Points
1	(Brazil) Emerson Fittipaldi	41
2	(United Kingdom) Jackie Stewart	37
3	(France) François Cevert	21
4	(United States) Peter Revson	11
5	(New Zealand) Denny Hulme	10

Constructors' Championship standings

Pos	Constructor	Points
1	(United Kingdom) Tyrrell-Ford	45
2	(United Kingdom) Lotus-Ford	41
3	(United Kingdom) McLaren-Ford	17
4	(Italy) Ferrari	9
5	(United Kingdom) Shadow-Ford	5

- Note: Only the top five positions are included for both sets of standings.

Previous race: 1973 Belgian Grand Prix	FIA Formula One World Championship; 1973 season	Next race: 1973 Swedish Grand Prix
Previous race: 1972 Monaco Grand Prix	Monaco Grand Prix	Next race: 1974 Monaco Grand Prix
