= 1972 Monaco Grand Prix =

Coordinates: 43°44′4.74″N 7°25′16.8″E

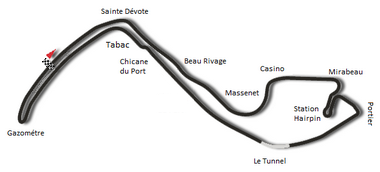

Race details
- Date: May 14, 1972
- Official name: XXX Grand Prix de Monaco
- Location: Circuit de Monaco, Monte Carlo, Monaco
- Course: Street circuit
- Course length: 3.145 km (1.954 miles)
- Distance: 80 laps, 251.600 km (156.337 miles)
- Weather: Wet

Pole position
Driver	(Brazil) Emerson Fittipaldi	Lotus-Ford
- Time: 1:21.4

Fastest lap
Driver	(France) Jean-Pierre Beltoise	BRM
- Time: 1:40.0

Podium
First	(France) Jean-Pierre Beltoise	BRM
Second	(Belgium) Jacky Ickx	Ferrari
Third	(Brazil) Emerson Fittipaldi	Lotus-Ford

The 1972 Monaco Grand Prix was a Formula One motor race held at Monaco on May 14, 1972. It was race 4 of 12 in both the 1972 World Championship of Drivers and the 1972 International Cup for Formula One Manufacturers. The track was substantially modified from 1971, in the interest of safety. The pits were moved to the harbor front, between the chicane and Tabac, and a new chicane was placed near Tabac. Jean-Pierre Beltoise's victory was the only one of his Formula One World Championship career as well as the last win for the BRM team and the first win for a Marlboro-sponsored F1 car.

== Qualifying ==
=== Qualifying classification ===
Pos.	No	Driver	Constructor	Time	Gap
1	8	(Brazil) Emerson Fittipaldi	Lotus-Ford	1:21.4	
2	6	(Belgium) Jacky Ickx	Ferrari	1:21.6	+0.2
3	7	(Switzerland) Clay Regazzoni	Ferrari	1:21.9	+0.5
4	17	(France) Jean-Pierre Beltoise	BRM	1:22.5	+1.1
5	18	(United Kingdom) Peter Gethin	BRM	1:22.6	+1.2
6	16	(New Zealand) Chris Amon	Matra	1:22.6	+1.2
7	14	(New Zealand) Denny Hulme	McLaren-Ford	1:22.7	+1.3
8	1	(United Kingdom) Jackie Stewart	Tyrrell-Ford	1:22.9	+1.5
9	22	(France) Henri Pescarolo	March-Ford	1:22.9	+1.5
10	15	(United Kingdom) Brian Redman	McLaren-Ford	1:23.1	+1.7
11	11	(United Kingdom) Mike Hailwood	Surtees-Ford	1:23.7	+2.3
12	2	(France) François Cevert	Tyrrell-Ford	1:23.8	+2.4
13	10	(Australia) Tim Schenken	Surtees-Ford	1:23.9	+2.5
14	9	(Australia) David Walker	Lotus-Ford	1:24.0	+2.6
15	3	(Sweden) Ronnie Peterson	March-Ford	1:24.1	+2.7
16	28	(Sweden) Reine Wisell	BRM	1:24.4	+3.0
17	26	(Austria) Helmut Marko	BRM	1:24.6	+3.2
18	12	(Italy) Andrea de Adamich	Surtees–Ford	1:24.7	+3.3
19	20	(United Kingdom) Graham Hill	Brabham–Ford	1:24.7	+3.3
20	19	(New Zealand) Howden Ganley	BRM	1:24.7	+3.3
21	21	(Brazil) Wilson Fittipaldi	Brabham-Ford	1:25.2	+3.8
22	4	(Austria) Niki Lauda	March-Ford	1:25.6	+4.2
23	5	(United Kingdom) Mike Beuttler	March-Ford	1:26.5	+5.1
24	23	(Brazil) Carlos Pace	March-Ford	1:26.6	+5.2
25	27	(West Germany) Rolf Stommelen	Eifelland-Ford	1:29.5	+8.1

== Race ==
=== Classification ===
Pos	No	Driver	Constructor	Laps	Time/Retired	Grid	Points
1	17	(France) Jean-Pierre Beltoise	BRM	80	2:26:55.3	4	9
2	6	(Belgium) Jacky Ickx	Ferrari	80	+ 38.2	2	6
3	8	(Brazil) Emerson Fittipaldi	Lotus-Ford	79	+ 1 lap	1	4
4	1	(United Kingdom) Jackie Stewart	Tyrrell-Ford	78	+ 2 laps	8	3
5	15	(United Kingdom) Brian Redman	McLaren-Ford	77	+ 3 laps	10	2
6	16	(New Zealand) Chris Amon	Matra	77	+ 3 laps	6	1
7	12	(Italy) Andrea de Adamich	Surtees-Ford	77	+ 3 laps	18	
8	26	(Austria) Helmut Marko	BRM	77	+ 3 laps	17	
9	21	(Brazil) Wilson Fittipaldi	Brabham-Ford	77	+ 3 laps	21	
10	27	(Germany) Rolf Stommelen	Eifelland-Ford	77	+ 3 laps	25	
11	3	(Sweden) Ronnie Peterson	March-Ford	76	+ 4 laps	15	
12	20	(United Kingdom) Graham Hill	Brabham-Ford	76	+ 4 laps	19	
13	5	(United Kingdom) Mike Beuttler	March-Ford	76	+ 4 laps	23	
14	9	(Australia) Dave Walker	Lotus-Ford	75	+ 5 laps	14	
15	14	(New Zealand) Denny Hulme	McLaren-Ford	74	+ 6 laps	7	
16	4	(Austria) Niki Lauda	March-Ford	74	+ 6 laps	22	
17	23	(Brazil) Carlos Pace	March-Ford	72	+ 8 laps	24	
NC	2	(France) François Cevert	Tyrrell-Ford	70	+ 10 laps	12	
Ret	22	(France) Henri Pescarolo	March-Ford	58	Accident	9	
Ret	7	(Switzerland) Clay Regazzoni	Ferrari	51	Accident	3	
Ret	11	(United Kingdom) Mike Hailwood	Surtees-Ford	48	Accident	11	
Ret	19	(New Zealand) Howden Ganley	BRM	47	Accident	20	
Ret	10	(Australia) Tim Schenken	Surtees-Ford	31	Accident	13	
Ret	18	(United Kingdom) Peter Gethin	BRM	27	Accident	5	
Ret	28	(Sweden) Reine Wisell	BRM	16	Engine	16	

== Notes ==
- This was the first pole position for Emerson Fittipaldi, and the first for a Brazilian driver.
- This was the 25th podium finish for a Belgian driver.

== Championship standings after the race ==
Drivers' Championship standings

	Pos	Driver	Points
1	1	(Brazil) Emerson Fittipaldi	19
1	2	(Belgium) Jacky Ickx	16
2	3	(New Zealand) Denny Hulme	15
	4	(United Kingdom) Jackie Stewart	12
20	5	(France) Jean-Pierre Beltoise	9

Constructors' Championship standings

	Pos	Constructor	Points
1	1	(United Kingdom) Lotus-Ford	19
1	2	(United Kingdom) McLaren-Ford	19
	3	(Italy) Ferrari	19
	4	(United Kingdom) Tyrrell-Ford	12
3	5	(United Kingdom) BRM	9

- Note: Only the top five positions are included for both sets of standings.

Previous race: 1972 Spanish Grand Prix	FIA Formula One World Championship; 1972 season	Next race: 1972 Belgian Grand Prix
Previous race: 1971 Monaco Grand Prix	Monaco Grand Prix	Next race: 1973 Monaco Grand Prix
