= 1972 German Grand Prix =

Race details
- Date: 30 July 1972
- Location: Nürburgring, Nürburg, West Germany
- Course: Permanent racing facility
- Course length: 22.835 km (14.19 miles)
- Distance: 14 laps, 319.690 km (198.65 miles)

Pole position
| Driver | (Belgium) Jacky Ickx | Ferrari |
- Time: 7:07.0

Fastest lap
| Driver | (Belgium) Jacky Ickx | Ferrari |
- Time: 7:13.6

Podium
| First | (Belgium) Jacky Ickx | Ferrari |
| Second | (Switzerland) Clay Regazzoni | Ferrari |
| Third | (Sweden) Ronnie Peterson | March-Ford |

The 1972 German Grand Prix was a Formula One motor race held at Nürburgring on 30 July 1972. It was race 8 of 12 in both the 1972 World Championship of Drivers and the 1972 International Cup for Formula One Manufacturers.

The 14-lap race was won by Belgian driver Jacky Ickx, driving a Ferrari. Ickx achieved a Grand Chelem – taking pole position, leading every lap and setting the fastest lap. It was his eighth, and final, World Championship race victory, and also Ferrari's only win of the season. Swiss teammate Clay Regazzoni finished second, with Swedish driver Ronnie Peterson third in a March-Ford.

== Qualifying ==
=== Qualifying classification ===
| Pos. | No | Driver | Constructor | Time | Gap |
|---|---|---|---|---|---|
| 1 | 4 | (Belgium) Jacky Ickx | Ferrari | 7:07.0 | |
| 2 | 1 | (United Kingdom) Jackie Stewart | Tyrrell-Ford | 7:08.7 | +1.7 |
| 3 | 2 | (Brazil) Emerson Fittipaldi | Lotus-Ford | 7:09.9 | +2.9 |
| 4 | 10 | (Sweden) Ronnie Peterson | March-Ford | 7:11.6 | +4.6 |
| 5 | 7 | (France) François Cevert | Tyrrell-Ford | 7:12.2 | +5.2 |
| 6 | 12 | (Argentina) Carlos Reutemann | Brabham-Ford | 7:12.4 | +5.4 |
| 7 | 9 | (Switzerland) Clay Regazzoni | Ferrari | 7:13.4 | +6.4 |
| 8 | 8 | (New Zealand) Chris Amon | Matra | 7:13.9 | +6.9 |
| 9 | 20 | (France) Henri Pescarolo | March-Ford | 7:14.4 | +7.4 |
| 10 | 3 | (New Zealand) Denny Hulme | McLaren-Ford | 7:14.5 | +7.5 |
| 11 | 21 | (Brazil) Carlos Pace | March-Ford | 7:16.6 | +9.6 |
| 12 | 15 | (Australia) Tim Schenken | Surtees-Ford | 7:17.2 | +10.2 |
| 13 | 6 | (France) Jean-Pierre Beltoise | BRM | 7:17.3 | +10.3 |
| 14 | 22 | (West Germany) Rolf Stommelen | Eifelland-Ford | 7:17.5 | +10.5 |
| 15 | 11 | (United Kingdom) Graham Hill | Brabham-Ford | 7:18.4 | +11.4 |
| 16 | 14 | (United Kingdom) Mike Hailwood | Surtees-Ford | 7:21.0 | +14.0 |
| 17 | 18 | (Sweden) Reine Wisell | BRM | 7:21.4 | +14.4 |
| 18 | 17 | (New Zealand) Howden Ganley | BRM | 7:22.3 | +15.3 |
| 19 | 5 | (United Kingdom) Brian Redman | McLaren-Ford | 7:23.2 | +16.2 |
| 20 | 16 | (Italy) Andrea de Adamich | Surtees-Ford | 7:23.7 | +16.7 |
| 21 | 26 | (Brazil) Wilson Fittipaldi | Brabham-Ford | 7:24.8 | +17.8 |
| 22 | 19 | (Italy) Arturo Merzario | Ferrari | 7:25.9 | +18.9 |
| 23 | 25 | (Australia) Dave Walker | Lotus-Ford | 7:29.5 | +22.5 |
| 24 | 23 | (Austria) Niki Lauda | March-Ford | 7:32.2 | +25.2 |
| 25 | 27 | (United Kingdom) Derek Bell | Tecno | 7:33.3 | +26.3 |
| 26 | 29 | (South Africa) Dave Charlton | Lotus-Ford | 7:34.1 | +27.1 |
| 27 | 28 | (United Kingdom) Mike Beuttler | March-Ford | 7:35.9 | +28.9 |

== Race ==
=== Race classification ===
| Pos | No | Driver | Constructor | Laps | Time/Retired | Grid | Points |
|---|---|---|---|---|---|---|---|
| 1 | 4 | (Belgium) Jacky Ickx | Ferrari | 14 | 1:42:12.3 | 1 | 9 |
| 2 | 9 | (Switzerland) Clay Regazzoni | Ferrari | 14 | + 48.3 | 7 | 6 |
| 3 | 10 | (Sweden) Ronnie Peterson | March-Ford | 14 | + 1:06.7 | 4 | 4 |
| 4 | 17 | (New Zealand) Howden Ganley | BRM | 14 | + 2:20.2 | 18 | 3 |
| 5 | 5 | (United Kingdom) Brian Redman | McLaren-Ford | 14 | + 2:35.7 | 19 | 2 |
| 6 | 11 | (United Kingdom) Graham Hill | Brabham-Ford | 14 | + 2:59.6 | 15 | 1 |
| 7 | 26 | (Brazil) Wilson Fittipaldi | Brabham-Ford | 14 | + 3:00.1 | 21 | |
| 8 | 28 | (United Kingdom) Mike Beuttler | March-Ford | 14 | + 5:10.7 | 27 | |
| 9 | 6 | (France) Jean-Pierre Beltoise | BRM | 14 | + 5:20.2 | 13 | |
| 10 | 7 | (France) François Cevert | Tyrrell-Ford | 14 | + 5:43.7 | 5 | |
| 11 | 1 | (United Kingdom) Jackie Stewart | Tyrrell-Ford | 13 | Collision | 2 | |
| 12 | 19 | (Italy) Arturo Merzario | Ferrari | 13 | + 1 Lap | 22 | |
| 13 | 16 | (Italy) Andrea de Adamich | Surtees-Ford | 13 | + 1 Lap | 20 | |
| 14 | 15 | (Australia) Tim Schenken | Surtees-Ford | 13 | + 1 Lap | 12 | |
| 15 | 8 | (New Zealand) Chris Amon | Matra | 13 | + 1 Lap | 8 | |
| NC | 21 | (Brazil) Carlos Pace | March-Ford | 11 | + 3 Laps | 11 | |
| Ret | 2 | (Brazil) Emerson Fittipaldi | Lotus-Ford | 10 | Gearbox | 3 | |
| Ret | 20 | (France) Henri Pescarolo | March-Ford | 10 | Accident | 9 | |
| Ret | 3 | (New Zealand) Denny Hulme | McLaren-Ford | 8 | Engine | 10 | |
| Ret | 14 | (United Kingdom) Mike Hailwood | Surtees-Ford | 8 | Suspension | 16 | |
| Ret | 12 | (Argentina) Carlos Reutemann | Brabham-Ford | 6 | Differential | 6 | |
| Ret | 22 | (West Germany) Rolf Stommelen | Eifelland-Ford | 6 | Electrical | 14 | |
| Ret | 25 | (Australia) Dave Walker | Lotus-Ford | 6 | Oil Leak | 23 | |
| Ret | 23 | (Austria) Niki Lauda | March-Ford | 4 | Oil Leak | 24 | |
| Ret | 27 | (United Kingdom) Derek Bell | Tecno | 4 | Engine | 25 | |
| Ret | 29 | (South Africa) Dave Charlton | Lotus-Ford | 4 | Physical | 26 | |
| Ret | 18 | (Sweden) Reine Wisell | BRM | 3 | Engine | 17 | |

== Championship standings after the race ==
Drivers' Championship standings

| | Pos | Driver | Points |
|---|---|---|---|
| | 1 | (Brazil) **Emerson Fittipaldi*** | 43 |
| | 2 | (United Kingdom) **Jackie Stewart*** | 27 |
| 1 | 3 | (Belgium) **Jacky Ickx*** | 25 |
| 1 | 4 | (New Zealand) **Denny Hulme*** | 21 |
| 4 | 5 | (Switzerland) **Clay Regazzoni*** | 13 |

Constructors' Championship standings

| | Pos | Constructor | Points |
|---|---|---|---|
| | 1 | (United Kingdom) **Lotus-Ford*** | 43 |
| | 2 | (United Kingdom) **Tyrrell-Ford*** | 33 |
| 1 | 3 | (Italy) **Ferrari*** | 29 |
| 1 | 4 | (United Kingdom) **McLaren-Ford*** | 29 |
| | 5 | (United Kingdom) **BRM*** | 12 |

- Note: Only the top five positions are included for both sets of standings.
- Competitors in bold and marked with an asterisk still had a theoretical chance of becoming World Champion.

| Previous race: 1972 British Grand Prix | FIA Formula One World Championship; 1972 season | Next race: 1972 Austrian Grand Prix |
| Previous race: 1971 German Grand Prix | German Grand Prix | Next race: 1973 German Grand Prix |
