= March 721 =

Formula One racing car

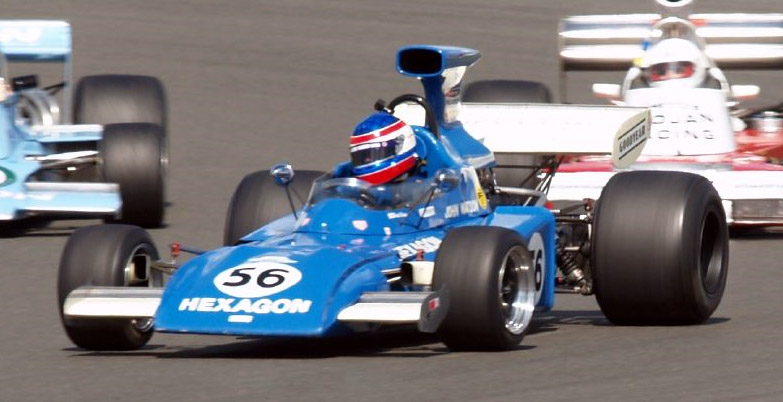
- Category: Formula One
- Designers: Robin Herd; Geoff Ferris
- Predecessor: March 711
- Successor: March 731

Technical specifications

Competition history
- Notable entrants: March Engineering
- Debut: 1972 Argentine Grand Prix, 1972 Spanish Grand Prix (721X, 721G)
Wins	Podiums	Poles
0	0, 1 (721G)	0, 1 (721G)
- Constructors' Championships: 0 (best: 6th (1972)
- Drivers' Championships: 0

The March 721 is a Formula One car, designed, developed, and made by March Engineering for the 1972 Formula One season. It was powered by the 3.0 L (180 cu in) Ford-Cosworth DFV engine. It was driven by Ronnie Peterson, Niki Lauda, Henri Pescarolo, Rolf Stommelen and Mike Beuttler.

== Racing history ==
The 721 was the successor model to the March 711 and, after the strong 1971 season, was intended to secure March's leap to the top of the Formula 1 constructors. It came in three versions: the traditional 721, the 721X, and the 721G.

The basic version of the 721, which did not have an additional designation in the form of a letter, was a slightly improved version of the old 711 and was built for customers such as Frank Williams Racing Cars and Günther Hennerici's Eifelland. It also served as an interim car for the factory team until the new 721X was ready. Eifelland's car was fitted with a new bodywork designed by Luigi Colani and was renamed as Eifelland E21.

The March 721X was a completely new design. The rear springs were highly hinged and could be operated via levers and springs. Designer Robin Herd wanted to create a low moment of inertia by concentrating most of the car's weight in the middle of the car. Alfa Romeo provided a transversal gearbox, fitted between the Cosworth DFV engine and the rear axle. In theory, this design made sense, but the Goodyear racing tires that March used in 1972 never really harmonized with the chassis. The front tires were constantly being overloaded, causing both oversteer and understeer. The drivers couldn't handle the car and the 721X is generally viewed as a bad design. Niki Lauda, one of the March factory drivers of 1972, called the 721X "a complete failure", "a stillbirth" and "a debacle".

Seeing that the car was a failure, March built an alternative model, the 721G, in just nine days to avert a complete failure in the 1972 season. For the 721G, a conventional Formula 2 chassis from the March 722 was adapted for Formula 1. Suspension and brakes were from the customer version of the 721, and the powerplant was again the Cosworth DFV V8 engine. In 1972, March had built three Formula 1 model within a year. Ronnie Peterson took third place with the G-Type at the German Grand Prix. Niki Lauda remained pointless with the March in his first full Formula 1 season.

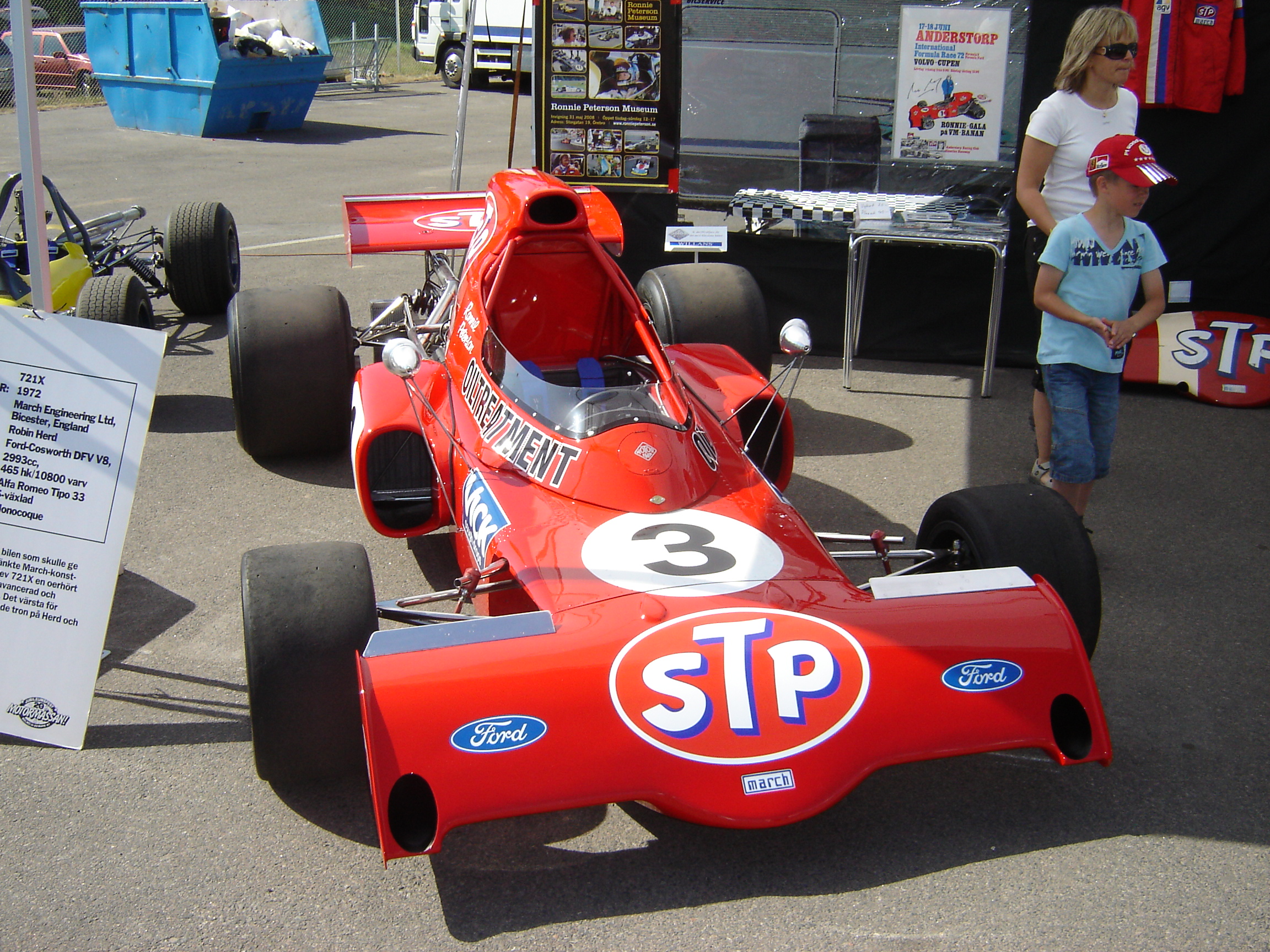
March 721 of Ronnie Peterson

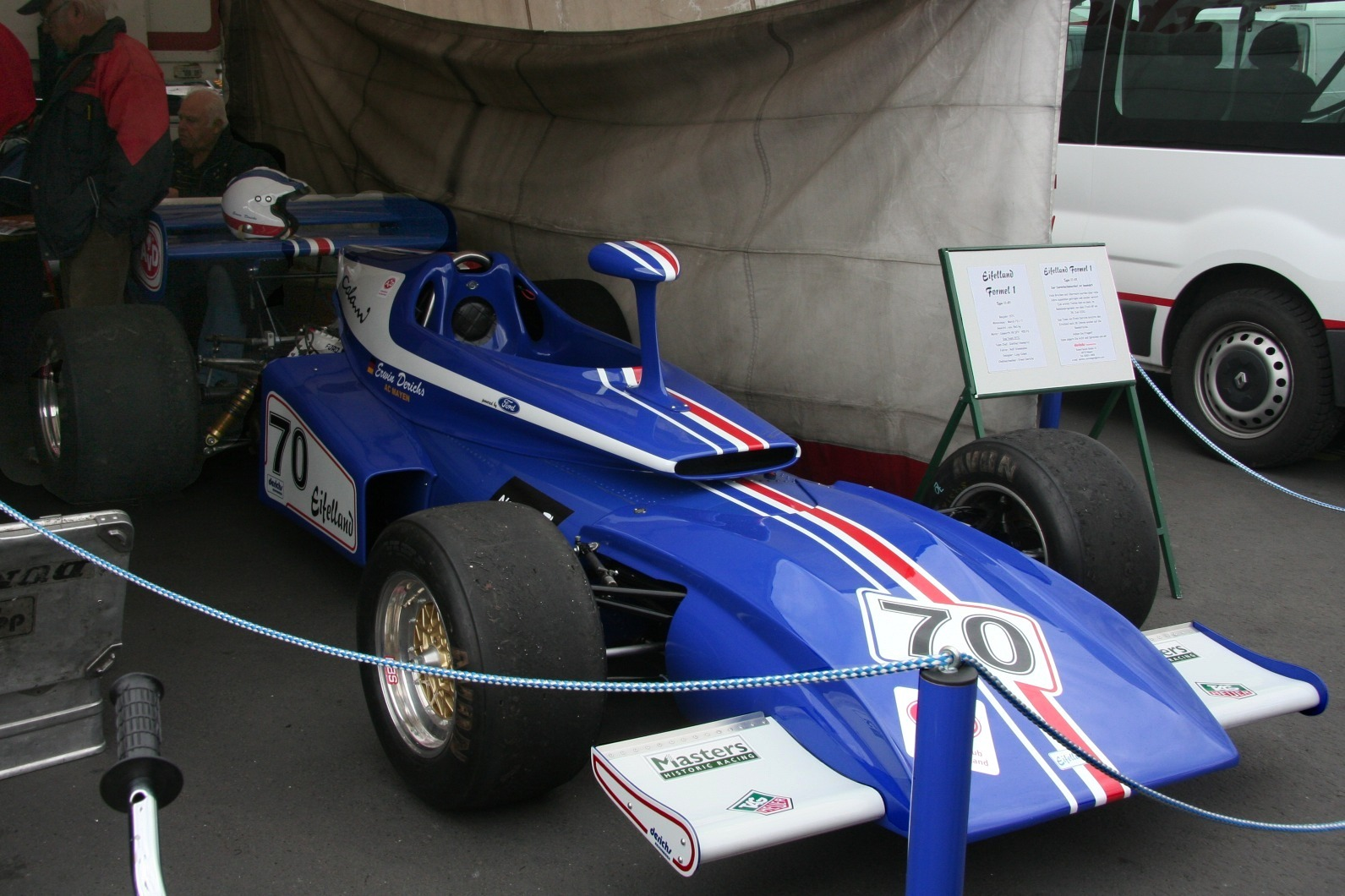
Eifelland E21

== Complete Formula One World Championship results ==
(key) (results in bold indicate pole position; results in italics indicate fastest lap)

Year	Entrant	Engine	Tyres	Chassis	Drivers	1	2	3	4	5	6	7	8	9	10	11	12	13	14	15	Points	WCC
1972	March Engineering	Cosworth DFV	G	721		ARG	RSA	ESP	MON	BEL	FRA	GBR	GER	AUT	ITA	CAN	USA				15*	6th
1972	March Engineering	Cosworth DFV	G	721	Ronnie Peterson	6	5														15*	6th
1972	March Engineering	Cosworth DFV	G	721	Niki Lauda	11	7														15*	6th
1972	March Engineering	Cosworth DFV	G	721X	Ronnie Peterson			Ret	11	9											15*	6th
1972	March Engineering	Cosworth DFV	G	721X	Niki Lauda			Ret	16	12											15*	6th
1972	March Engineering	Cosworth DFV	G	721G	Ronnie Peterson						5	7	3	12	9	DSQ	4				15*	6th
1972	March Engineering	Cosworth DFV	G	721G	Niki Lauda						Ret	9	Ret	10	13	DSQ	NC				15*	6th
1972	Team Williams Motul	Cosworth DFV	G	721	Henri Pescarolo	8	11	11	Ret	NC	DNS	Ret	DNS	DNQ	13	14					15*	6th
1972	Team Eifelland	Cosworth DFV	G	721	Rolf Stommelen		13	Ret	10	11	16	10	Ret	15							15*	6th
1972	Clarke-Mordaunt-Guthrie Racing	Cosworth DFV	G	721G	Mike Beuttler			DNQ	13	Ret	19	13	8	Ret	10	NC	13				15*	6th
1973	March Engineering	Cosworth DFV	G	721G		ARG	BRA	RSA	ESP	BEL	MON	SWE	FRA	GBR	NED	GER	AUT	ITA	CAN	USA	14*	5th
1973	March Engineering	Cosworth DFV	G	721G	Jean-Pierre Jarier	Ret	Ret	NC													14*	5th
1973	Clarke-Mordaunt-Guthrie-Durlacher	Cosworth DFV	F	721G	Mike Beuttler	10	Ret	NC													14*	5th

*includes points scored by other March types
