= March 711 =

Formula One racing car

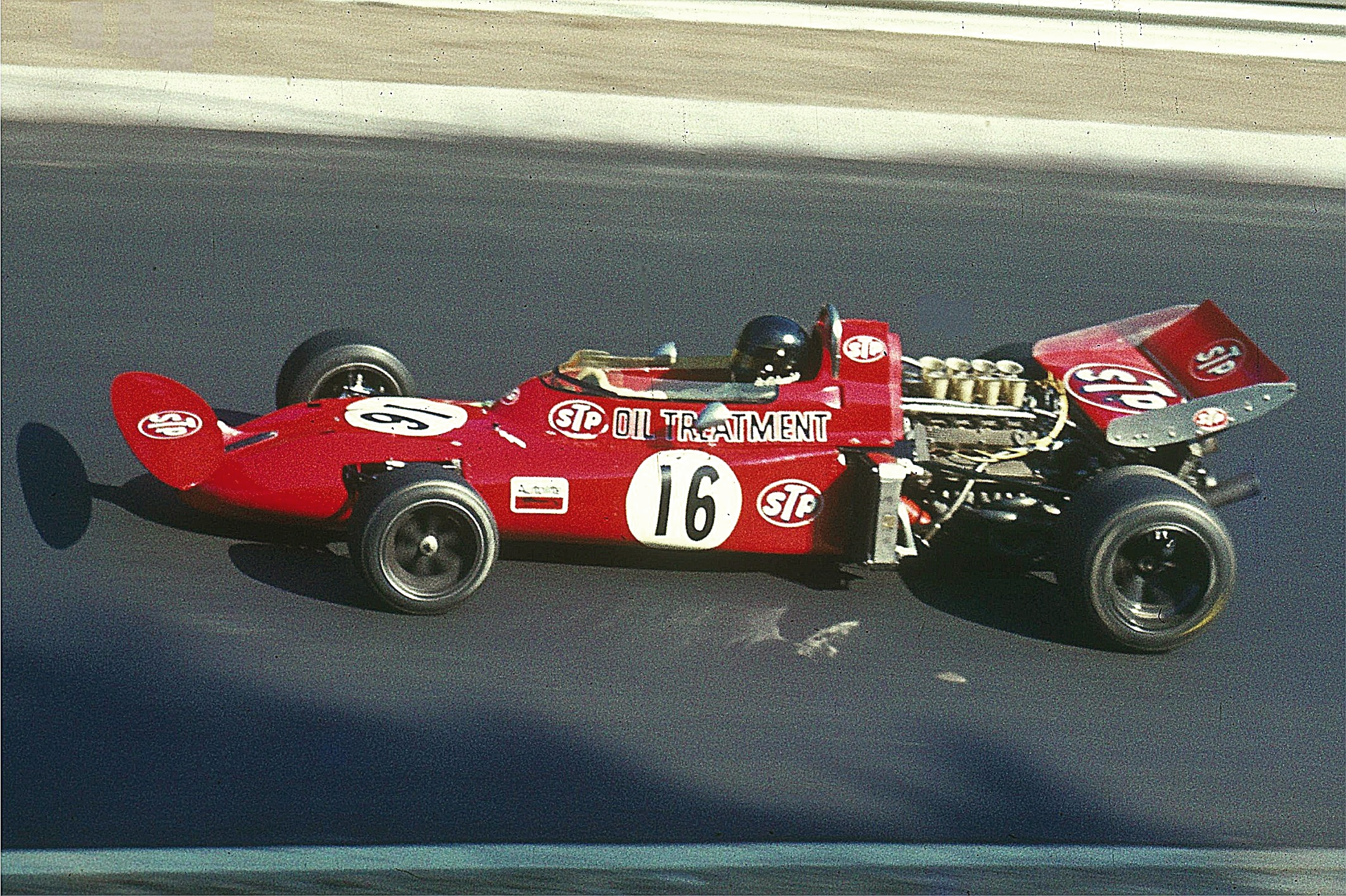
- Category: Formula One
- Constructor: March Engineering
- Designers: Robin Herd; Geoff Ferris
- Predecessor: March 701
- Successor: March 721

Technical specifications
- Chassis: Aluminium monocoque
- Suspension (front): Double wishbones, Rocker-actuated Coil springs over dampers, Anti-roll bar
- Suspension (rear): Lower wishbones and links, top links, Single trailing arms, Coil springs over Dampers, Anti-roll bar
- Axle track: 1,524 mm (60.0 in) (Front); 1,524 mm (60.0 in) (Rear)
- Wheelbase: 2,438 mm (96.0 in)
- Engine: Ford-Cosworth DFV; Alfa Romeo Tipo 33 2,993 cc (182.6 cu in) 90° V8 naturally aspirated mid-mounted
- Transmission: Hewland FG 400 6-speed manual.
- Weight: 560 kg (1,230 lb)
- Fuel: Shell; Motul
- Tyres: Firestone; Goodyear

Competition history
- Notable entrants: March Engineering
- Notable drivers: (Sweden) Ronnie Peterson (Italy) Andrea de Adamich (Spain) Alex Soler-Roig (France) Henri Pescarolo (Italy) Nanni Galli (United States) Skip Barber (United Kingdom) Mike Beuttler (Austria) Niki Lauda (Brazil) Carlos Pace (United Kingdom) Ray Allen
- Debut: 1971 South African Grand Prix
Races	Wins	Poles	F/Laps
22	0	0	1
- Constructors' Championships: 0 (best: 4th (1971)
- Drivers' Championships: 0 (best: 2nd - Ronnie Peterson (1971))

The March 711 was a Formula One racing car, designed by Robin Herd and Geoff Ferris, for the 1971 season, and saw continued use throughout the 1972 season. It had a distinctive appearance with a front 'tea-tray' spoiler. Despite winning no races, works driver Ronnie Peterson finished runner-up in the 1971 Drivers' World Championship.

== Race history ==
=== 1971 season ===
In 1971, the March 711 was primarily entered by the works STP March Racing Team, initially with Ronnie Peterson and Alex Soler-Roig in Cosworth-powered cars and Andrea de Adamich in an Alfa Romeo-powered car. Soler-Roig was eventually replaced by Nanni Galli, and Niki Lauda also made a one-off appearance at the Austrian Grand Prix. During this season, Peterson finished second four times in Monaco, Great Britain, Italy, and Canada. The best qualification of the season was a fifth place for Peterson in Great Britain. Peterson finished second in the Drivers' World Championship behind Jackie Stewart and ahead of François Cevert. On the constructors' side, the team finished fourth, behind Scuderia Ferrari and ahead of Team Lotus.

During the 1971 season, Frank Williams Racing Cars entered a 711 for Henri Pescarolo. His best qualification was tenth place in Germany and Italy and his best result a fourth place in Great Britain, making him the only driver other than Peterson to score points in a 711. Skip Barber also entered a few Grands Prix with Gene Mason Racing. His best qualification was twenty-fourth in the Netherlands and Canada. However, he did not manage to finish any races. Finally, Mike Beuttler joined Clarke-Mordaunt-Guthrie Racing; his best qualification was sixteenth in Italy, but he did not finish the race.

=== 1972 season ===
In 1972, the March 711 was entered full-time only by Team Williams Motul with Carlos Pace. His best qualification was eleventh place in Belgium, France, and Germany. The best result obtained was fifth place in Belgium which allowed him to score 3 points and to rank eighteenth in the world championship ahead of Tim Schenken and behind Andrea de Adamich. Speed International entered Ray Allen in the British Grand Prix but the car was unavailable. Finally, Skip Barber drove for Gene Mason Racing in the United States and Canadian Grands Prix. His best weekend was that of Canada, with a qualification in twentieth position and sixteenth place in the race.

== Complete Formula One World Championship results ==
(key) (results in bold indicate pole position; results in italics indicate fastest lap)

Year	Entrant	Engine	Tyres	Drivers	1	2	3	4	5	6	7	8	9	10	11	12	Points	WCC
1971	STP March	Ford Cosworth DFV; 3.0 V8	F		RSA	ESP	MON	NED	FRA	GBR	GER	AUT	ITA	CAN	USA		**33 (34)**	4th
1971	STP March	Ford Cosworth DFV; 3.0 V8	F	Ronnie Peterson	10	Ret	2	4		2	5	8	2	2	3		**33 (34)**	4th
1971	STP March	Ford Cosworth DFV; 3.0 V8	F	Alex Soler-Roig	Ret	Ret	DNQ	Ret	Ret								**33 (34)**	4th
1971	STP March	Ford Cosworth DFV; 3.0 V8	F	Nanni Galli					DNS	11			Ret	16	Ret		**33 (34)**	4th
1971	STP March	Ford Cosworth DFV; 3.0 V8	F	Niki Lauda								Ret					**33 (34)**	4th
1971	STP March	Ford Cosworth DFV; 3.0 V8	F	Mike Beuttler										NC			**33 (34)**	4th
1971	Frank Williams Racing Cars	Ford Cosworth DFV; 3.0 V8	G	Henri Pescarolo		Ret	8	13	Ret	4	Ret	6	Ret	DNS	Ret		**33 (34)**	4th
1971	Gene Mason Racing	Ford Cosworth DFV; 3.0 V8	F	Skip Barber			DNQ	NC						Ret	NC		**33 (34)**	4th
1971	Clarke-Mordaunt-Guthrie Racing	Ford Cosworth DFV; 3.0 V8	F	Mike Beuttler						Ret	DSQ	NC	Ret				**33 (34)**	4th
1971	STP March	Alfa Romeo T33; 3.0 V8	F	Andrea de Adamich	13	Ret			Ret	NC	Ret		Ret		13		**0**	NC
1971	STP March	Alfa Romeo T33; 3.0 V8	F	Nanni Galli			DNQ	Ret			12	12					**0**	NC
1971	STP March	Alfa Romeo T33; 3.0 V8	F	Ronnie Peterson					Ret								**0**	NC
1972	Team Williams Motul	Ford Cosworth DFV; 3.0 V8	G		ARG	RSA	ESP	MON	BEL	FRA	GBR	GER	AUT	ITA	CAN	USA	**15***	6th
1972	Team Williams Motul	Ford Cosworth DFV; 3.0 V8	G	Carlos Pace		17	6	17	5	Ret	Ret	NC	NC	Ret	9	Ret	**15***	6th
1972	Gene Mason Racing	Ford Cosworth DFV; 3.0 V8	F	Skip Barber											NC	16	**15***	6th

* Includes points scored by other March chassis

== Non-Championship Formula One results ==
(key) (races in bold indicate pole position; races in italics indicate fastest lap)

Year	Entrant	Engine	Tyres	Driver	1	2	3	4	5	6	7	8
Year	Entrant	Engine	Tyres	Driver	ARG	ROC	QUE	SPR	INT	RIN	OUL	VIC
1971	March Engineering	Cosworth DFV	**F**	Nanni Galli						5		
1971	March Engineering	Cosworth DFV	**F**	Alex Soler-Roig						8		
1971	March Engineering	Cosworth DFV	**F**	Ronnie Peterson			18			2		16
1971	March Engineering	Alfa Romeo T33	**F**	Ronnie Peterson					Ret			
1971	Frank Williams Racing Cars	Cosworth DFV	**G**	Ronnie Peterson		Ret						
1971	Frank Williams Racing Cars	Cosworth DFV	**G**	Henri Pescarolo			Ret		6		Ret	Ret
1971	Clarke-Mordaunt-Guthrie Racing	Cosworth DFV	**F**	Mike Beuttler							Ret	
1971	Gene Mason Racing	Cosworth DFV	**F**	Skip Barber						6		
1972	Team Williams Motul	Cosworth DFV	**G**		ROC	BRA	INT	OUL	REP	VIC		
1972	Team Williams Motul	Cosworth DFV	**G**	Henri Pescarolo					Ret			
1972	Team Williams Motul	Cosworth DFV	**G**	Carlos Pace		Ret						
1972	Team Williams Motul	Cosworth DFV	**G**	Luiz Bueno		6						
