= Skip Barber =

American racing driver (born 1936)

- Born: November 16, 1936 (age 89); Philadelphia, Pennsylvania, U.S.

Formula One World Championship career
- Nationality: (United States) American
- Active years: 1971 – 1972
- Team: Privateer March
- Entries: 6 (5 starts)
- Championships: 0
- Wins: 0
- Podiums: 0
- Career points: 0
- Pole positions: 0
- Fastest laps: 0
- First entry: 1971 Monaco Grand Prix
- Last entry: 1972 United States Grand Prix

John "Skip" Barber III (born November 16, 1936) is an American retired racecar driver who is most famous for founding and previously owning the Skip Barber Racing Schools.

== Driving career ==
Barber started racing in 1958 while studying at Harvard University, where he earned a degree in English.

In the mid-1960s, Barber won three SCCA national championships in a row and finished third in the 1967 United States Road Racing Championship. Later, Barber won consecutive Formula Ford National Championships (1969 and 1970), a record tied only recently.

At the start of the 1971 season, Barber purchased a March 711, which he planned to take back to the United States and race in the U.S. Formula 5000 series. Before he did so, he took part in the Monaco Grand Prix, Dutch Grand Prix, United States Grand Prix, and Canadian Grand Prix in a privately funded March. He returned to the U.S. and Canadian races in 1972. After that, he raced GT cars.

== Retirement leads to Skip Barber Racing ==
When his racing career ended, Barber's belief that auto racing was "coachable" in the same manner as any other sport—at the time, a distinctly minority position—led him to create the eponymously named racing school, and a year later the equal-car race series.

In 1975, with two borrowed Lola Formula Fords and four students, Barber started the Skip Barber School of High Performance Driving. In 1976 it was renamed the "Skip Barber Racing School", and that same year he created the Skip Barber Race Series. Barber divested from the racing school in 1999.

Barber was the owner and operator of Lime Rock Park, a road-racing venue in Connecticut. In April 2021 he sold the facility to Lime Rock Group, LLC. He maintains a minority stake. He lives in the nearby town of Sharon, Connecticut with wife Judy.

Barber was inducted into the SCCA Hall of Fame on March 2, 2013.

Barber was inducted into the Motorsports Hall of Fame of America in 2025.

== Racing record ==
=== SCCA National Championship Runoffs ===
Year	Track	Car	Engine	Class	Finish	Start	Status
1969	Daytona	Caldwell D9	Ford Kent	Formula Ford	1	20	Running
1970	Road Atlanta	Tecno	Ford Kent	Formula Ford	1	4	Running
1971	Road Atlanta	Tecno	Ford	Formula B	1	3	Running

=== Complete Formula One results ===
(key)

Year	Entrant	Chassis	Engine	1	2	3	4	5	6	7	8	9	10	11	12	WDC	Points
1971	Gene Mason Racing	March 711	Cosworth V8	RSA	ESP	MON; DNQ	NED; NC	FRA	GBR	GER	AUT	ITA	CAN; Ret	USA; NC		NC	0
1972	Gene Mason Racing	March 711	Cosworth V8	ARG	RSA	ESP	MON	BEL	FRA	GBR	GER	AUT	ITA	CAN; NC	USA; 16	NC	0

=== American open-wheel ===
(key) (Races in bold indicate pole position)

==== USAC Championship Car ====
USAC Championship Car results
Year	Team	Chassis	Engine	1	2	3	4	5	6	7	8	9	10	11	12	13	14	Pos.	Pts
1974	Crower Engineering	Eagle	Chevrolet	ONT; 15	ONT	ONT; 32	PHX	TRE	INDY	MIL	POC	MCH	MIL	MCH	TRE	TRE	PHX	NC	0
