= Mike Beuttler =

British racing driver (1940–1988)

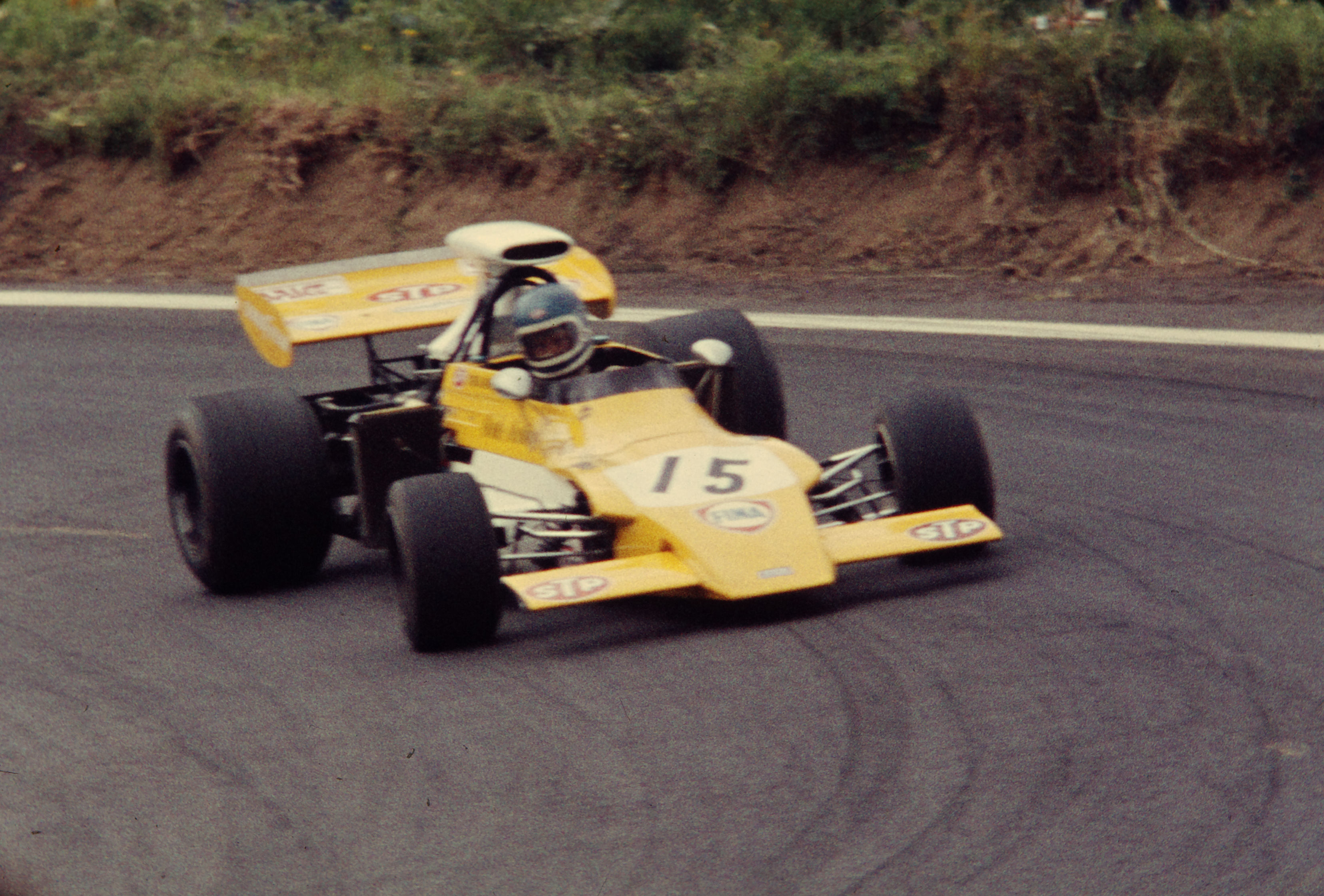
- Born: 13 April 1940; Cairo, Kingdom of Egypt
- Died: 29 December 1988 (aged 48); Los Angeles, California, U.S.

Formula One World Championship career
- Nationality: (United Kingdom) British
- Active years: 1971–1973
- Team: Non-works March
- Entries: 29 (28 starts)
- Championships: 0
- Wins: 0
- Podiums: 0
- Career points: 0
- Pole positions: 0
- Fastest laps: 0
- First entry: 1971 British Grand Prix
- Last entry: 1973 United States Grand Prix

Michael Simon Brindley Bream Beuttler (13 April 1940 – 29 December 1988) was a British Formula One driver who raced privately entered March cars. He was born in Cairo, Egypt, the son of Colonel Leslie Brindley Bream Beuttler, Duke of Wellington's Regiment, O.B.E., and a descendant on his mother's side of the Scottish ornithologist William Robert Ogilvie-Grant, grandson of the 6th Earl of Seafield.

Beuttler was a talented Formula Three driver from the late 1960s, who then graduated to Formula Two and then to Formula One in 1971.

The finance for the team came from a group of stockbroker friends from whom the team took its name – at first Clarke-Mordaunt-Guthrie Racing, and in 1973 it became Clarke-Mordaunt-Guthrie-Durlacher Racing. This approach of funding the team earned his car the nickname of the "Stockbroker Special".

Beuttler raced on one occasion, at the 1971 Canadian Grand Prix, for the works March team. Beuttler's best result was a seventh place in the 1973 Spanish Grand Prix.

While Beuttler did not achieve a points-scoring finish during his career in Formula One, he did achieve six top-ten finishes in the 28 races in which he competed, results that would have delivered points by today's championship regulations.

When his backers suffered amid the 1973 oil crisis, Beuttler retired from racing the following year, at the age of 34, after competing in the 1000 km of Brands Hatch.

== Personal life ==
Beuttler is often described as the first openly gay Formula One driver, although former Autosport editor and friend Ian Phillips has described Beuttler as "semi-closeted", adding "I'm not sure anybody really knew. We all just kind of suspected it. Because people weren’t open about being gay in those days and he took this lovely girlfriend to all the races which I suspect was just to distract because people didn’t come out as being gay in those days." Beuttler remained the only known male LGBT+ driver to have raced at that level until 2009, when the Portuguese former Formula One driver Mário de Araújo Cabral came out as bisexual at 75 years old, and more recently in 2024, when the German former racing driver and pundit Ralf Schumacher announced that he was in a same-sex relationship.

While little is known about Beuttler's life after his career in motorsport, he eventually moved to the United States, where he died of complications resulting from AIDS in 1988, in Los Angeles, aged 48.

Beuttler was also the brother-in-law of politician Alan Clark, who had married Beuttler's sister Jane.

== Complete Formula One results ==
(key)

Year	Entrant	Chassis	Engine	1	2	3	4	5	6	7	8	9	10	11	12	13	14	15	WDC	Points
1971	Clarke-Mordaunt-Guthrie Racing	March 711	Cosworth V8	RSA	ESP	MON	NED	FRA	GBR; Ret	GER; DSQ	AUT; NC	ITA; Ret							NC	0
1971	STP March	March 711	Cosworth V8										CAN; NC	USA					NC	0
1972	Clarke-Mordaunt-Guthrie Racing	March 721G	Cosworth V8	ARG	RSA	ESP; DNQ	MON; 13	BEL; Ret	FRA; Ret	GBR; 13	GER; 8	AUT; Ret	ITA; 10	CAN; NC	USA; 13				NC	0
1973	Clarke-Mordaunt-Guthrie-Durlacher	March 721G	Cosworth V8	ARG; 10	BRA; Ret	RSA; NC													NC	0
1973	Clarke-Mordaunt-Guthrie-Durlacher	March 731	Cosworth V8				ESP; 7	BEL; 11	MON; Ret	SWE; 8	FRA	GBR; 11	NED; Ret	GER; 16	AUT; Ret	ITA; Ret	CAN; Ret	USA; 10	NC	0

== See also ==
Philippe Vogel et le sport automobile (French)
