= 1972 Italian Republic Grand Prix =

- Non-championship race in the 1972 Formula One season

Race details
- Date: June 18, 1972
- Official name: Marlboro Gran Premio Repubblica Italiana
- Location: ACI Vallelunga Circuit in Rome, Italy
- Course: Permanent racing facility
- Course length: 3.202 km (1.99 miles)
- Distance: 80 laps, 256.153 km (159.167 miles)
- Weather: Hot

Pole position
Driver	(Brazil) Emerson Fittipaldi	Lotus-Cosworth
- Time: 1:09.82

Fastest lap
Driver	(Brazil) Emerson Fittipaldi	Lotus-Cosworth
- Time: 1:11.06

Podium
First	(Brazil) Emerson Fittipaldi	Lotus-Cosworth
Second	(Italy) Andrea de Adamich	Surtees-Cosworth
Third	(Italy) Nanni Galli	Tecno

The 1972 Italian Republic Grand Prix was a non-championship Formula One race held at Vallelunga Circuit on June 18, 1972.

== Results ==
Pos	No	Driver	Constructor	Laps	Time/Retired	Grid
1	1	(Brazil) Emerson Fittipaldi	Lotus-Cosworth	80	1:37:31.9	1
2	6	(Italy) Andrea de Adamich	Surtees-Cosworth	80	+ 32.8	5
3	14	(Italy) Nanni Galli	Tecno	79	+ 1 Lap	8
4	9	(United Kingdom) Mike Beuttler	March-Cosworth	79	+ 1 Lap	6
5	12	(New Zealand) Howden Ganley	BRM	59	+ 21 Lap	2
Ret	4	(France) Henri Pescarolo	March-Cosworth	49	Broken Wishbone	4
Ret	11	(United Kingdom) Peter Gethin	BRM	32	Gearbox	3
DNS	8	(Austria) Niki Lauda	March-Cosworth		Practice accident	7

Previous race: 1972 International Gold Cup	Formula One non-championship races 1972 season	Next race: 1972 World Championship Victory Race
Previous race: —	Italian Republic Grand Prix	Next race: —
