= 1972 Formula One season =

26th season of the FIA's Formula One motor racing

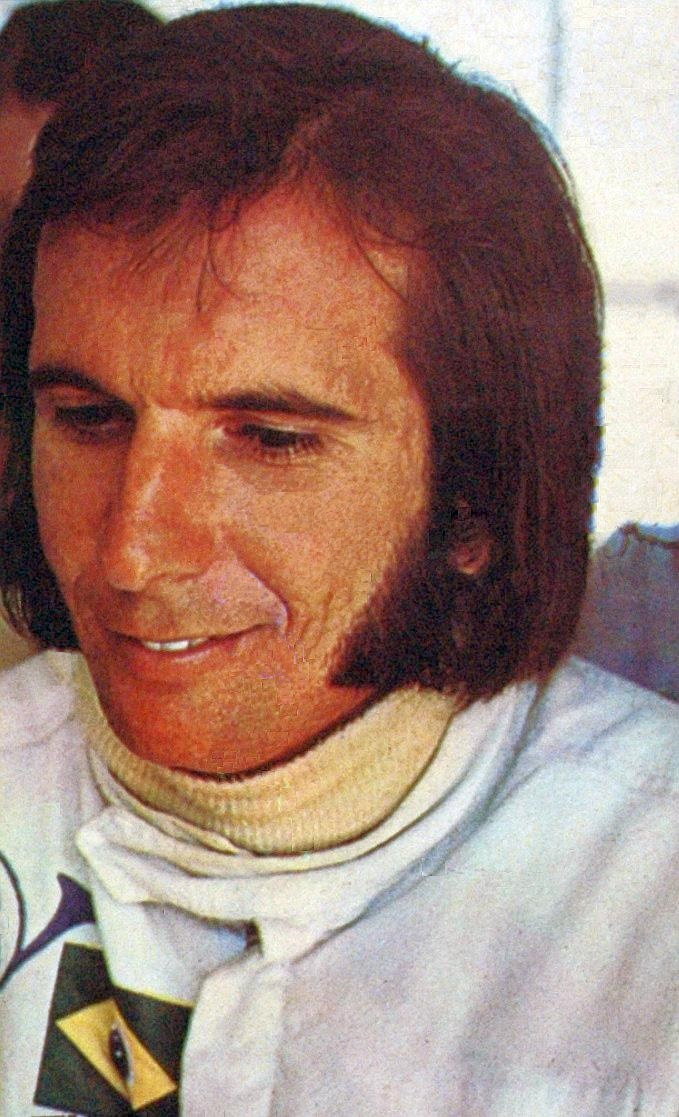
Emerson Fittipaldi (pictured in 1973) won the first of his two Drivers' Championships driving for Lotus-Ford.

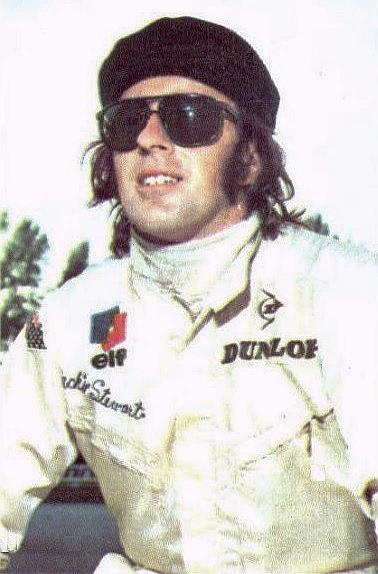
Then two-time and defending Champion Jackie Stewart (pictured in 1970) finished in second place driving for Tyrrell-Ford.

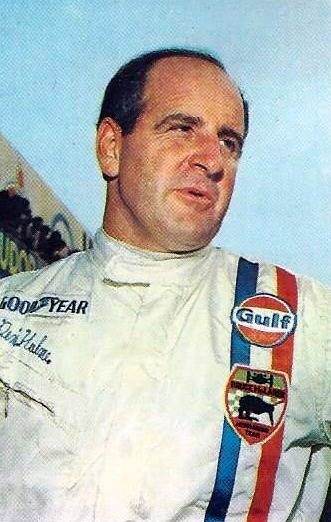
1967 Champion Denny Hulme (pictured in 1970) finished the season in third driving for McLaren-Ford.

The 1972 Formula One season was the 26th season of the FIA's Formula One motor racing. It featured the 23rd World Championship of Drivers, the 15th International Cup for F1 Manufacturers, and numerous non-championship Formula One races. The World Championship commenced on 23 January and ended on 8 October after twelve races.

Emerson Fittipaldi, driving for Lotus, won his first World Championship, becoming the youngest World Champion to date at 25 years. This record stood for 33 years until Fernando Alonso won his first title in 2005 at the age of 24. Fittipaldi won five races (more than any other driver during the season) and clinched the title by virtue of winning the Italian Grand Prix with two races to spare. Reigning champion Jackie Stewart came second in the championship, while Denny Hulme placed third. The Lotus team, still reeling from the death of their 1970 champion Jochen Rindt, had fallen to a disappointing fifth in the standings at the end of 1971, but kept developing their innovative Lotus 72 "wedge" design to take a surprise championship victory. The car sported a striking black and gold livery for their sponsor Imperial Tobacco had introduced a new brand of John Player Special cigarettes.

The British Racing Motors (BRM) team took its last victory when Jean-Pierre Beltoise won the rain-affected 1972 Monaco Grand Prix in a BRM P160.

Six-times 350cc/500cc champions and 1964 World Championship John Surtees retired after the end of season.

== Drivers and constructors ==
The following teams and drivers contested the 1972 World Championship.

Entrant	Constructor	Chassis	Engine	Tyre	Driver	Rounds
(United Kingdom) Motor Racing Developments	Brabham-Ford	BT33; BT34; BT37	Ford Cosworth DFV 3.0 V8	G	(United Kingdom) Graham Hill	All
(United Kingdom) Motor Racing Developments	Brabham-Ford	BT33; BT34; BT37	Ford Cosworth DFV 3.0 V8	G	(Argentina) Carlos Reutemann	1–2, 5–12
(United Kingdom) Motor Racing Developments	Brabham-Ford	BT33; BT34; BT37	Ford Cosworth DFV 3.0 V8	G	(Brazil) Wilson Fittipaldi	3–12
(United Kingdom) Marlboro BRM (United Kingdom) España Marlboro BRM (United Kingdom) Austria Marlboro BRM	BRM	P160B; P153; P180; P160C	BRM P142 3.0 V12	F	(New Zealand) Howden Ganley	1–6, 8–12
(United Kingdom) Marlboro BRM (United Kingdom) España Marlboro BRM (United Kingdom) Austria Marlboro BRM	BRM	P160B; P153; P180; P160C	BRM P142 3.0 V12	F	(Sweden) Reine Wisell	1, 3–4, 6, 8, 10
(United Kingdom) Marlboro BRM (United Kingdom) España Marlboro BRM (United Kingdom) Austria Marlboro BRM	BRM	P160B; P153; P180; P160C	BRM P142 3.0 V12	F	(United Kingdom) Peter Gethin	1–7, 9–12
(United Kingdom) Marlboro BRM (United Kingdom) España Marlboro BRM (United Kingdom) Austria Marlboro BRM	BRM	P160B; P153; P180; P160C	BRM P142 3.0 V12	F	(Spain) Alex Soler-Roig	1, 3
(United Kingdom) Marlboro BRM (United Kingdom) España Marlboro BRM (United Kingdom) Austria Marlboro BRM	BRM	P160B; P153; P180; P160C	BRM P142 3.0 V12	F	(Austria) Helmut Marko	1–2, 4–6
(United Kingdom) Marlboro BRM (United Kingdom) España Marlboro BRM (United Kingdom) Austria Marlboro BRM	BRM	P160B; P153; P180; P160C	BRM P142 3.0 V12	F	(France) Jean-Pierre Beltoise	2–12
(United Kingdom) Marlboro BRM (United Kingdom) España Marlboro BRM (United Kingdom) Austria Marlboro BRM	BRM	P160B; P153; P180; P160C	BRM P142 3.0 V12	F	(Australia) Vern Schuppan	5
(United Kingdom) Marlboro BRM (United Kingdom) España Marlboro BRM (United Kingdom) Austria Marlboro BRM	BRM	P160B; P153; P180; P160C	BRM P142 3.0 V12	F	(United Kingdom) Jackie Oliver	7
(United Kingdom) Marlboro BRM (United Kingdom) España Marlboro BRM (United Kingdom) Austria Marlboro BRM	BRM	P160B; P153; P180; P160C	BRM P142 3.0 V12	F	(Canada) Bill Brack	11
(United Kingdom) Marlboro BRM (United Kingdom) España Marlboro BRM (United Kingdom) Austria Marlboro BRM	BRM	P160B; P153; P180; P160C	BRM P142 3.0 V12	F	(United Kingdom) Brian Redman	12
(Italy) Scuderia Ferrari SpA SEFAC	Ferrari	312B2	Ferrari 001/1 3.0 F12	F	(Belgium) Jacky Ickx	All
(Italy) Scuderia Ferrari SpA SEFAC	Ferrari	312B2	Ferrari 001/1 3.0 F12	F	(Switzerland) Clay Regazzoni	1–5, 8–12
(Italy) Scuderia Ferrari SpA SEFAC	Ferrari	312B2	Ferrari 001/1 3.0 F12	F	(United States) Mario Andretti	1–3, 10, 12
(Italy) Scuderia Ferrari SpA SEFAC	Ferrari	312B2	Ferrari 001/1 3.0 F12	F	(Italy) Nanni Galli	6
(Italy) Scuderia Ferrari SpA SEFAC	Ferrari	312B2	Ferrari 001/1 3.0 F12	F	(Italy) Arturo Merzario	7–8
(United Kingdom) John Player Team Lotus (United Kingdom) World Wide Racing	Lotus-Ford	72D	Ford Cosworth DFV 3.0 V8	F	(Brazil) Emerson Fittipaldi	All
(United Kingdom) John Player Team Lotus (United Kingdom) World Wide Racing	Lotus-Ford	72D	Ford Cosworth DFV 3.0 V8	F	(Australia) David Walker	1–9, 12
(United Kingdom) John Player Team Lotus (United Kingdom) World Wide Racing	Lotus-Ford	72D	Ford Cosworth DFV 3.0 V8	F	(Sweden) Reine Wisell	11–12
(United Kingdom) STP March Racing Team	March-Ford	721; 721X; 721G	Ford Cosworth DFV 3.0 V8	G	(Sweden) Ronnie Peterson	All
(United Kingdom) STP March Racing Team	March-Ford	721; 721X; 721G	Ford Cosworth DFV 3.0 V8	G	(Austria) Niki Lauda	All
(France) Équipe Matra Sports	Matra	MS120C; MS120D	Matra MS72 3.0 V12	G	(New Zealand) Chris Amon	All
(United Kingdom) Yardley Team McLaren	McLaren-Ford	M19A; M19C	Ford Cosworth DFV 3.0 V8	G	(New Zealand) Denny Hulme	All
(United Kingdom) Yardley Team McLaren	McLaren-Ford	M19A; M19C	Ford Cosworth DFV 3.0 V8	G	(United States) Peter Revson	1–3, 5, 7, 9–12
(United Kingdom) Yardley Team McLaren	McLaren-Ford	M19A; M19C	Ford Cosworth DFV 3.0 V8	G	(United Kingdom) Brian Redman	4, 6, 8
(United Kingdom) Yardley Team McLaren	McLaren-Ford	M19A; M19C	Ford Cosworth DFV 3.0 V8	G	(South Africa) Jody Scheckter	12
(United Kingdom) Brooke Bond Oxo - Rob Walker Team Surtees (United Kingdom) Ceramica Pagnossin Team Surtees (United Kingdom) Flame Out Team Surtees (United Kingdom) Team Surtees	Surtees-Ford	TS9B; TS14	Ford Cosworth DFV 3.0 V8	F	(Australia) Tim Schenken	All
(United Kingdom) Brooke Bond Oxo - Rob Walker Team Surtees (United Kingdom) Ceramica Pagnossin Team Surtees (United Kingdom) Flame Out Team Surtees (United Kingdom) Team Surtees	Surtees-Ford	TS9B; TS14	Ford Cosworth DFV 3.0 V8	F	(Italy) Andrea de Adamich	All
(United Kingdom) Brooke Bond Oxo - Rob Walker Team Surtees (United Kingdom) Ceramica Pagnossin Team Surtees (United Kingdom) Flame Out Team Surtees (United Kingdom) Team Surtees	Surtees-Ford	TS9B; TS14	Ford Cosworth DFV 3.0 V8	F	(United Kingdom) Mike Hailwood	2–10, 12
(United Kingdom) Brooke Bond Oxo - Rob Walker Team Surtees (United Kingdom) Ceramica Pagnossin Team Surtees (United Kingdom) Flame Out Team Surtees (United Kingdom) Team Surtees	Surtees-Ford	TS9B; TS14	Ford Cosworth DFV 3.0 V8	F	(United Kingdom) John Surtees	10, 12
(United Kingdom) Elf Team Tyrrell	Elf Tyrrell-Ford	003; 002; 004; 005; 006	Ford Cosworth DFV 3.0 V8	G	(United Kingdom) Jackie Stewart	1–4, 6–12
(United Kingdom) Elf Team Tyrrell	Elf Tyrrell-Ford	003; 002; 004; 005; 006	Ford Cosworth DFV 3.0 V8	G	(France) François Cevert	All
(United Kingdom) Elf Team Tyrrell	Elf Tyrrell-Ford	003; 002; 004; 005; 006	Ford Cosworth DFV 3.0 V8	G	(France) Patrick Depailler	6, 12
(United Kingdom) Team Williams Motul	March-Ford Politoys-Ford	711; 721; FX3	Ford Cosworth DFV 3.0 V8	G	(France) Henri Pescarolo	All
(United Kingdom) Team Williams Motul	March-Ford Politoys-Ford	711; 721; FX3	Ford Cosworth DFV 3.0 V8	G	(Brazil) Carlos Pace	2–12
(West Germany) Team Eifelland Caravans	Eifelland-Ford	21	Ford Cosworth DFV 3.0 V8	G	(West Germany) Rolf Stommelen	2–9
(South Africa) Lucky Strike Racing	Lotus-Ford	72D	Ford Cosworth DFV 3.0 V8	F	(South Africa) Dave Charlton	2, 6–8
(South Africa) Team Gunston	Surtees-Ford	TS9	Ford Cosworth DFV 3.0 V8	F	(Rhodesia) John Love	2
(South Africa) Team Gunston	Brabham-Ford	BT33	Ford Cosworth DFV 3.0 V8	F	(South Africa) William Ferguson	2
(United Kingdom) Clarke-Mordaunt-Guthrie Racing	March-Ford	721G	Ford Cosworth DFV 3.0 V8	F	(United Kingdom) Mike Beuttler	3–12
(Italy) Martini Racing	Tecno	PA123/3	Tecno Series-P 3.0 F12	F	(Italy) Nanni Galli	5, 7, 9–10
(Italy) Martini Racing	Tecno	PA123/3	Tecno Series-P 3.0 F12	F	(United Kingdom) Derek Bell	6, 8, 10–12
(United Kingdom) Darnval Connew Racing Team	Connew-Ford	PC1	Ford Cosworth DFV 3.0 V8	F	(France) François Migault	7, 9
(United States) Gene Mason Racing	March-Ford	711	Ford Cosworth DFV 3.0 V8	F	(United States) Skip Barber	11–12
(United States) Champcarr Inc.	Surtees-Ford	TS9B	Ford Cosworth DFV 3.0 V8	F	(United States) Sam Posey	12

=== Team and driver changes ===
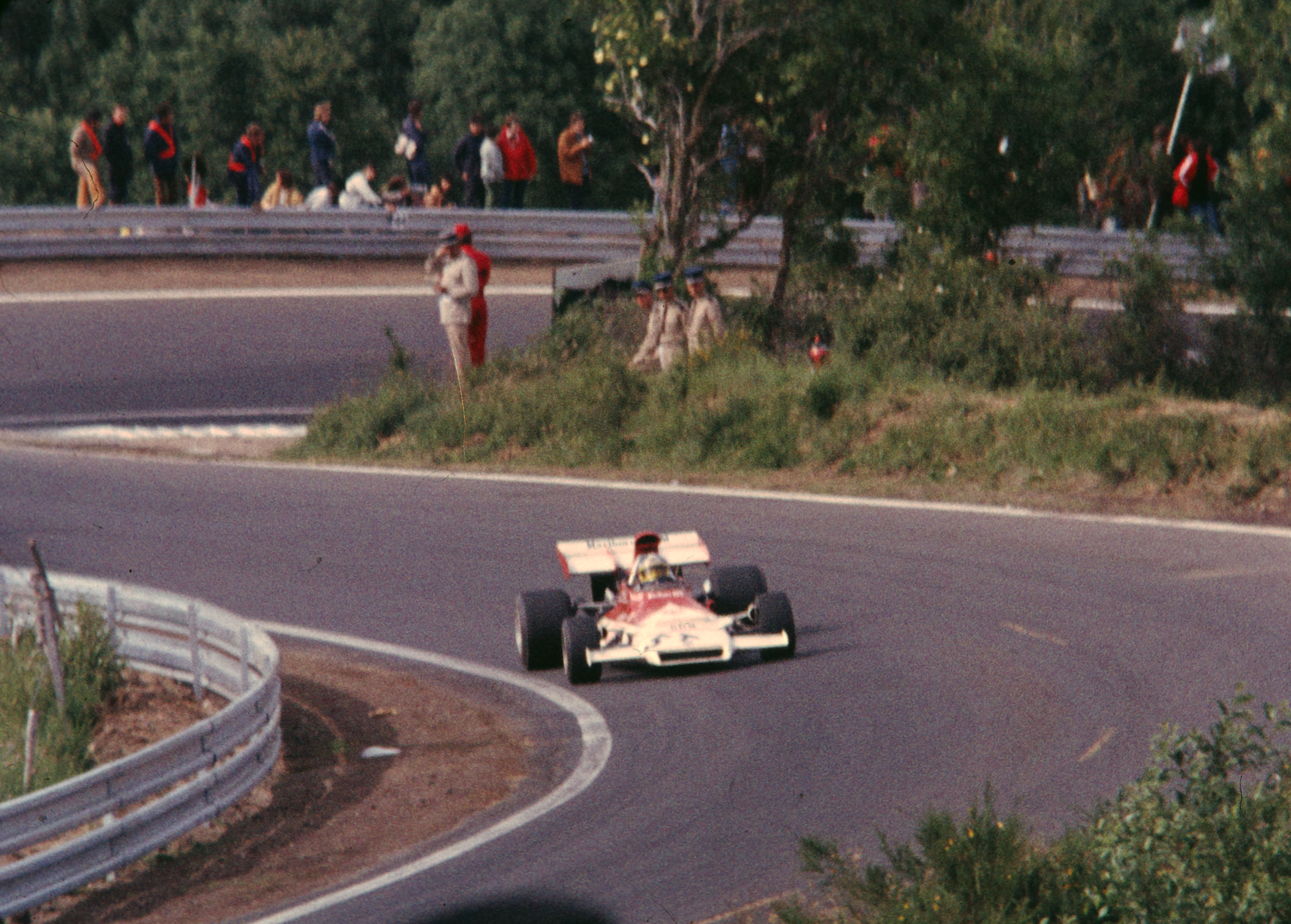
Jean-Pierre Beltoise, driving for BRM in the 1972 French Grand Prix

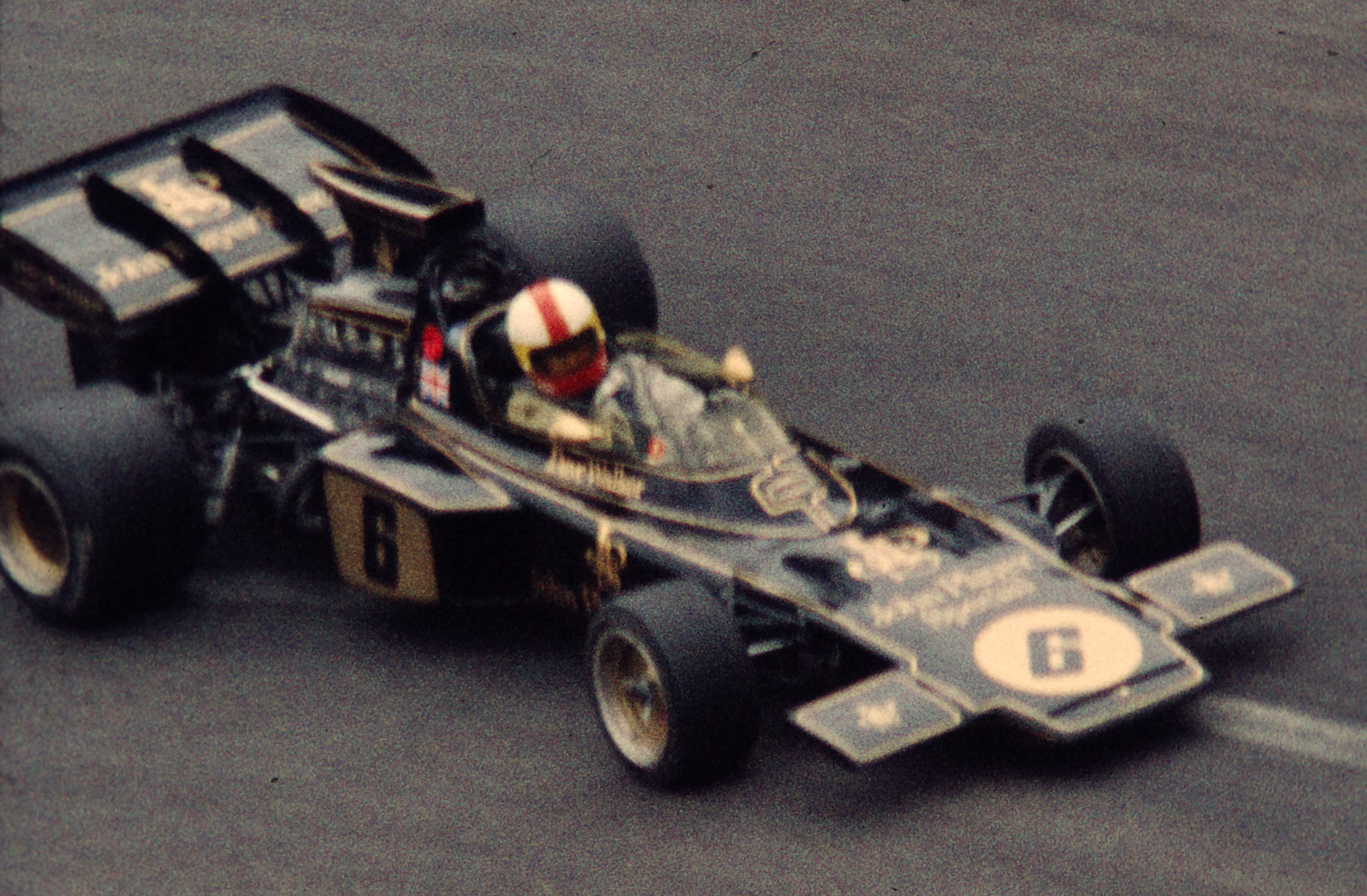
David Walker in the Lotus 72

- BRM hired Reine Wisell from Lotus and Jean-Pierre Beltoise from Matra. The team had lost Jo Siffert when he died during the 1971 World Championship Victory Race at Brands Hatch. Still, they were a popular outfit and managed to field no less than five cars in the opening race of the championship.
- After a collaboration with McLaren in 1970, Alfa Romeo had worked with March in 1971. Both campaigns were unsuccessful and the Italian firm pulled out of the sport. (They would return with Brabham in 1976.) March promoted their Formula Two driver Niki Lauda to the F1 team, while the Austrian kept racing in F2 as well.
- At Lotus, Emerson Fittipaldi was joined by David Walker, while McLaren signed 1971 Can-Am champion Peter Revson. They had previously worked together for the 1971 Indianapolis 500.
- Matra reduced their operations to just one car, after Beltoise moved to BRM.
- The Surtees team signed Tim Schenken from Brabham and Andrea de Adamich from March. Mike Hailwood was promoted to a full-time drive while still driving in Formula Two. He would actually win the F2 title this year. Owner John Surtees would shift focus to his management role and retired from racing at the end of the season.
- Brabham, in the hands of new managing director Bernie Ecclestone, promoted their F2 driver Carlos Reutemann to race besides veteran Graham Hill. Wilson Fittipaldi Júnior paid his way to a third Brabham seat.
- Starting his third year as a team owner in F1, Frank Williams gained sponsorship from French oil company Motul, with which he was able to buy a new March 721 for his driver Henri Pescarolo. He also promoted his F2 driver Carlos Pace to the team, giving him previous year's March 711. The Williams team tried out with a Politoys FX3, but the car's steering failed on the first run, during the British Grand Prix, and the chassis was heavily damaged.

==== Mid-season changes ====
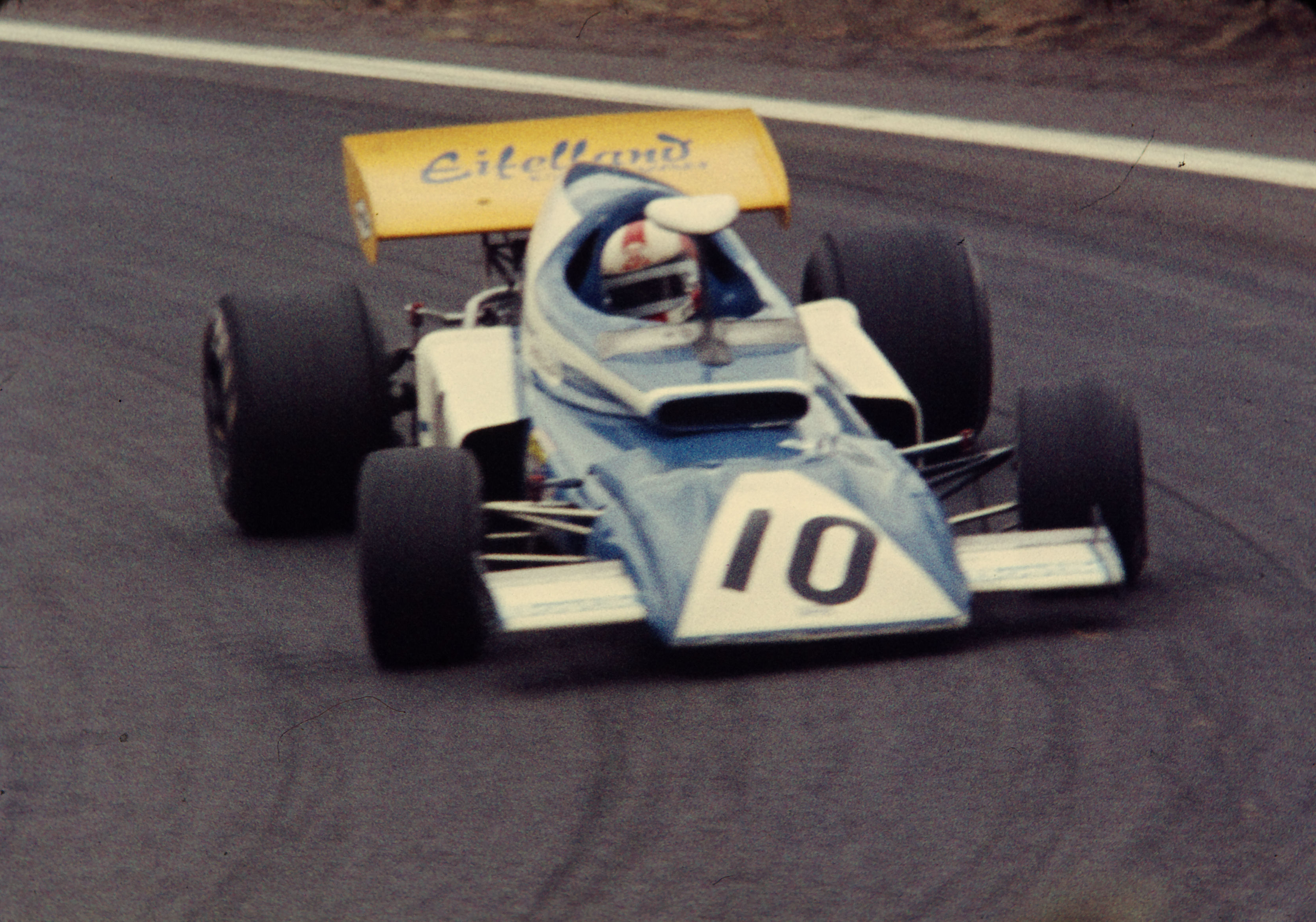
Rolf Stommelen in the Eifelland in France

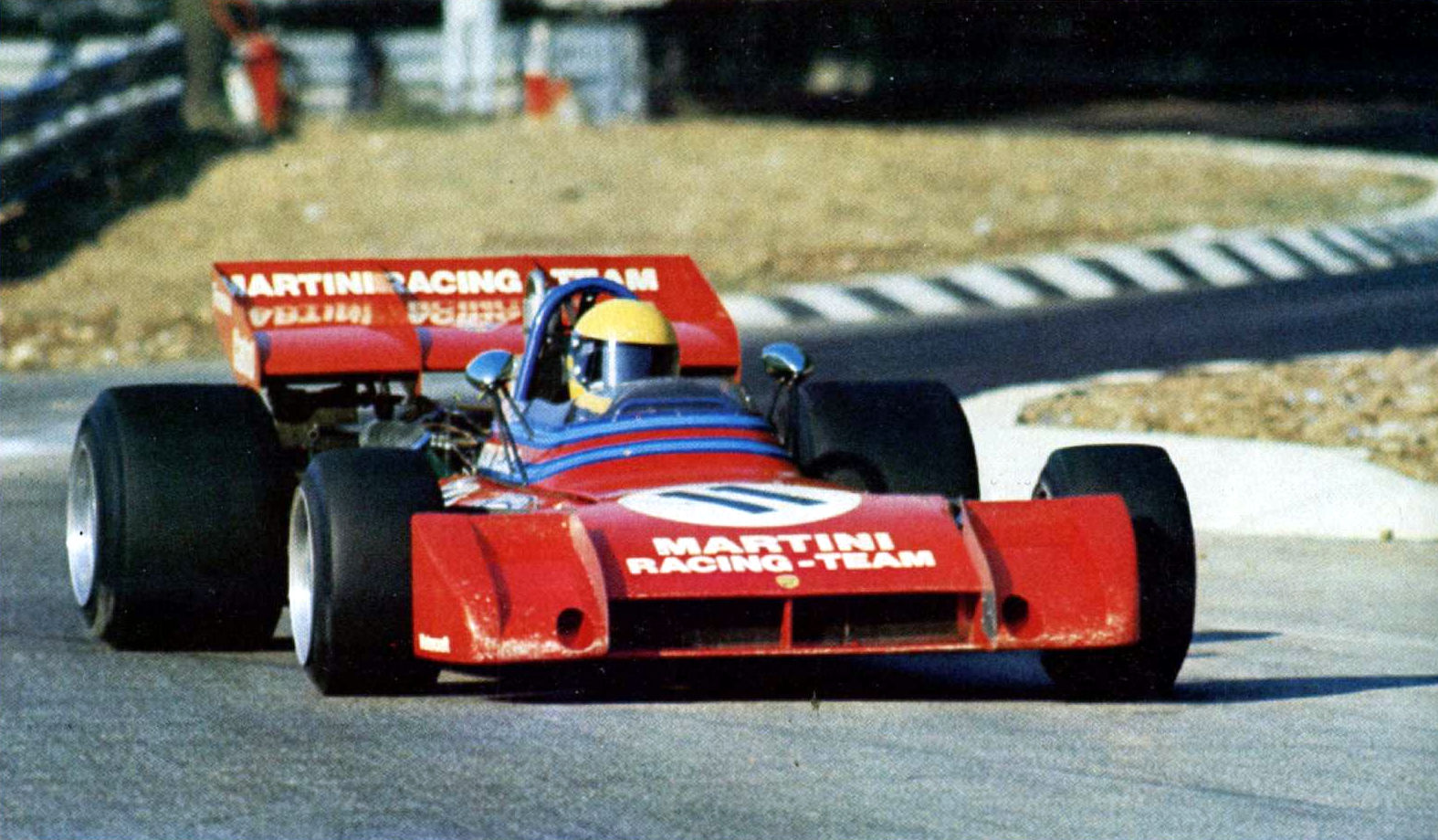
Nanni Galli in the Tecno during the Italian GP

- Günther Hennerici, owner of the caravan manufacturing company Eifelland, married Formula Two driver Hannelore Werner. Together, they set up a racing team that competed in the 1971 German Formula Three Championship, before expanding to F1 in 1972. From the second race of the season on, they entered a redesigned March 721 under the Eifelland name and signed Rolf Stommelen from Surtees. Before the season was over, however, they withdrew from the championship and refocussed their efforts on Formula Three.
- Tecno was a successful Italian karting and racing team. With sponsorship from Martini, they built their own F1 chassis and entered the 1972 championship from the Belgian Grand Prix on. They signed Nanni Galli, coming from the March team.
- The Connew Racing Team had the intent to enter and compete in the whole 1972 season, but only managed to start the Austrian Grand Prix, with French driver Francois Migault at the wheel. They converted their self-made chassis to meet Formula 5000 regulations for 1973, but at the end of that year, the car was crashed beyond repair and the team folded.

== Calendar ==
Round	Grand Prix	Circuit	Date
1	Argentine Grand Prix	(Argentina) Autódromo de Buenos Aires, Buenos Aires	23 January
2	South African Grand Prix	(South Africa) Kyalami Grand Prix Circuit, Midrand	4 March
3	Spanish Grand Prix	(Spain) Circuito Permanente del Jarama, Madrid	1 May
4	Monaco Grand Prix	Circuit de Monaco, Monte Carlo	14 May
5	Belgian Grand Prix	(Belgium) Nivelles-Baulers, Nivelles	4 June
6	French Grand Prix	(France) Circuit de Charade, Clermont-Ferrand	2 July
7	British Grand Prix	(United Kingdom) Brands Hatch, Kent	15 July
8	German Grand Prix	(West Germany) Nürburgring, Nürburg	30 July
9	Austrian Grand Prix	(Austria) Österreichring, Spielberg	13 August
10	Italian Grand Prix	(Italy) Autodromo Nazionale di Monza, Monza	10 September
11	Canadian Grand Prix	(Canada) Mosport Park, Bowmanville	24 September (Note: The Canadian Grand Prix was supposed to be held at Circuit Mont-Tremblant was due to host the race in rotation with Mosport Park but the Mont-Tremblant circuit had safety concerns regarding the bitter winters seriously affecting the track surface and a dispute with the local racing authorities there in 1972. Mosport would host the race in 1972 on its intended date.)
12	United States Grand Prix	(United States) Watkins Glen International, New York	8 October

=== Calendar changes ===
- The Argentine Grand Prix returned to the calendar in 1972, for the first time since 1960. The Autódromo de Buenos Aires would be used again.
- The Belgian Grand Prix returned as well, after the 1971 race was cancelled because of the failure to bring Circuit de Spa-Francorchamps up to mandatory safety standards. The 1972 race was held at the Nivelles-Baulers circuit.
- The Spanish Grand Prix was moved from Montjuïc to Jarama, in keeping with the event-sharing arrangement between the two circuits. Likewise, the French Grand Prix was moved from Circuit Paul Ricard to the Circuit de Charade and the British Grand Prix was moved from Silverstone to Brands Hatch.

==== Cancelled rounds ====
- F1 intended to organise a second Grand Prix in the United States, dubbed the United States Grand Prix West, at the Ontario Motor Speedway near Los Angeles. It would be the third race on the calendar on 9 April. The FIA demanded the circuit's owners to hold a test event first, but they did not comply and the event was cancelled.
- The Dutch Grand Prix was originally scheduled for 18 June, between the Belgian and French Grand Prix, but was cancelled because of safety upgrades that were not completed at the Circuit Park Zandvoort in time for the race, due to lack of funds.
- The Mexican Grand Prix was scheduled on 22 October at Autódromo Magdalena Mixhuca, to be the last race of the championship, but it was cancelled after local interest dissipated after the death of Pedro Rodríguez in a sportscar crash in 1971.

== Regulation changes ==
=== Technical regulations ===
- The minimum weight was raised from 530 kg (1,170 lb) to 550 kg (1,210 lb).
- Like it was from 1966 to 1969, cars running a compressed engine, for example with a turbocharger, could now have a displacement of 1,500 cc (92 cu in). (For the two years in between, it was reduced to 500 cc (31 cu in).) The maximum displacement for naturally aspirated engines remained at 3,000 cc (180 cu in).

=== Safety measures ===
Safety was becoming a serious talking point in F1. Since 1969, circuits had started installing some safety features. 1972 was the first season in which all the visited tracks were up to the mandatory safety standards. The official Circuit Safety Criteria were published, including, for example, specifications on debris fences.

On the cars, some safety measures were made mandatory as well:

- the fuel tanks had to be lined with "safety foam",
- no magnesium sheet could be less than 3 millimetres (0.12 in) thick,
- the driver had to have a headrest,
- minimum dimensions were set for the cockpit,
- the driver had to be secured by a 6-point harness,
- a single switch was designed to cut off the electronical components on the car and to set off the fire extinguisher,
- a 15W red light needed to be installed at the rear of the car.

=== Sporting regulations ===
The first Drivers' Code of Conduct was published.

== Championship report ==
=== Rounds 1 to 4 ===
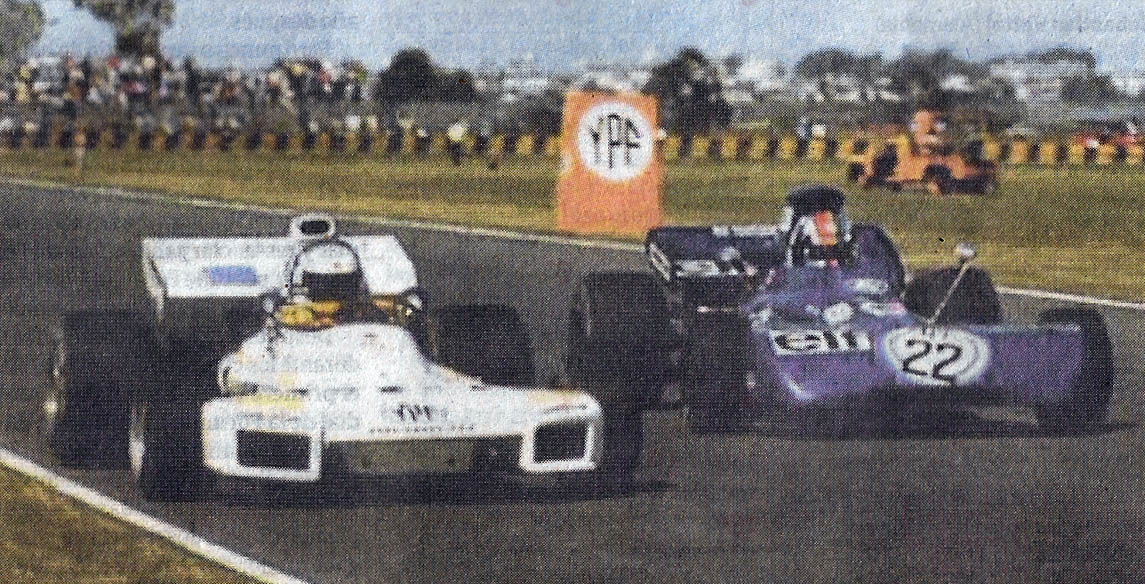
Carlos Reutemann (left) started on pole position in his debut race.

When Formula One returned to Argentina for the first time since 1960, it was local driver Carlos Reutemann who made his debut and immediately scored pole position for Brabham. Reigning champion Jackie Stewart started second in his Tyrrell and Peter Revson lined up in third for his first race with McLaren. At the start, Stewart took the lead off of Reutemann, but the Argentine driver kept on his tail. Behind them, Emerson Fittipaldi overtook Denny Hulme for third place, while Revson had fallen back. Reutemann started struggling on his super-soft Goodyear tyres and, by lap 11, he was down to fourth place. Half-way through the race, he made a pit stop and rejoined a lap down. Stewart dominated the pace and went on to win the race, almost half a minute ahead of Hulme and a full minute ahead of the Ferraris of Jacky Ickx and Clay Regazzoni. Fittipaldi had retired with suspension damage.

Stewart secured pole position for the South African Grand Prix at Kyalami, ahead of Regazzoni and Fittipaldi. Hulme got off the line remarkably well: from his fifth position on the grid, he moved up to shortly take the lead, before Stewart relegated him back to second. Regazzoni fell back into the midfield. Veteran Mike Hailwood, driving for Surtees, started fourth but passed Fittipaldi and, later, the overheating McLaren of Hulme, before actually challenging Stewart for the lead. However, on lap 28, his rear suspension collapsed and he had to retire. Stewart then looked set to win, until he suffered a gearbox failure on lap 45 and Fittipaldi inherited the lead. The Brazilian, however, ran into handling problems and saw Hulme go past. Finally, the New Zealander took the chequered flag, ahead of Fittipaldi and Peter Revson.

In Spain, Emerson Fittipaldi was joined on the grid by his brother Wilson, marking the first time two brothers raced simultaneously. Wilson had replaced Carlos Reutemann after the Argentine driver injured his ankle in a Formula 2 race a week earlier. On the Jarama circuit, the Belgian Jacky Ickx took a dominant pole position, seven tenths ahead of Denny Hulme and Emerson Fittipaldi. Stewart started in fourth. On race day, Hulme had another mighty get-away and took the lead, before, like in South Africa, Stewart passed him. Hulme and Ickx were then both passed by Fittipaldi in a miscommunication with a backmarker. By lap 30, it had started raining slightly and Stewart fell back: Fittipaldi and Ickx both passed him. The Brazilian held on to take the victory, while Stewart spun off the track and retired. Since Ickx had set a new lap record and actually lapped his teammate in third place, Fittipaldi's win showed that the Lotus 72 was now truly ahead in the development race.

This showed again during qualifying for the Monaco Grand Prix, where Fittipaldi took pole position ahead of the Ferraris of Ickx and Regazzoni. Jean-Pierre Beltoise and Peter Gethin started a surprising fourth and fifth for BRM. Before the race, it had started raining and the cars took off in a cloud of spray. Fittipaldi got away slowly, so Ickx jumped ahead, but Beltoise surprised everyone, pulling off a dive to the inside of the first corner and coming out on top. The Marlboro-sponsored BRM was now the only one with a clear view ahead. Just after half-distance, Gethin crashed in the new chicane before Tabac corner and Stewart spun off as well. The Scot, however, regained his podium position when Regazzoni crashed off on a patch of oil. Beltoise held on to what would be his only victory and BRM's last. Ickx finished second ahead of Fittipaldi, who overtook Stewart in the end.

In the drivers' championship, Emerson Fittipaldi (Lotus) led with 19 points, ahead of Jacky Ickx (Ferrari and Denny Hulme (McLaren). Reigning champion Jackie Stewart (Tyrrell) was in fourth. In the manufacturers' championship, Lotus, McLaren and Ferrari all shared the top spot with 19 points.

=== Rounds 5 to 7 ===
Jackie Stewart was a notable absence in the Belgian Grand Prix. His gruelling schedule of racing in F1, Can-Am and touring cars, as well as promotional events for sponsors Elf and Ford, and a side job as sports commentator on United States television on top of that, resulted in a case of gastritis. Under doctor's orders, he rested for three weeks and severely restricted his activities after that. Championship leader Emerson Fittipaldi qualified on pole position in the Lotus, ahead of Clay Regazzoni in the Ferrari and Denny Hulme in the McLaren. Regazzoni's teammate Jacky Ickx, second in the championship, lined up in fourth, with Francois Cevert, the primary Tyrrell driver for this race, in fifth. At the start, Regazzoni took the lead, but saw Fittipaldi come back past on lap 9. Both Ferraris retired: Ickx with a problem to his accelerator linkage and Regazzoni when he hit backmarker Nanni Galli in the Tecno. The order at the finish of a relatively unexciting race was Fittipaldi, Cevert, Hulme.

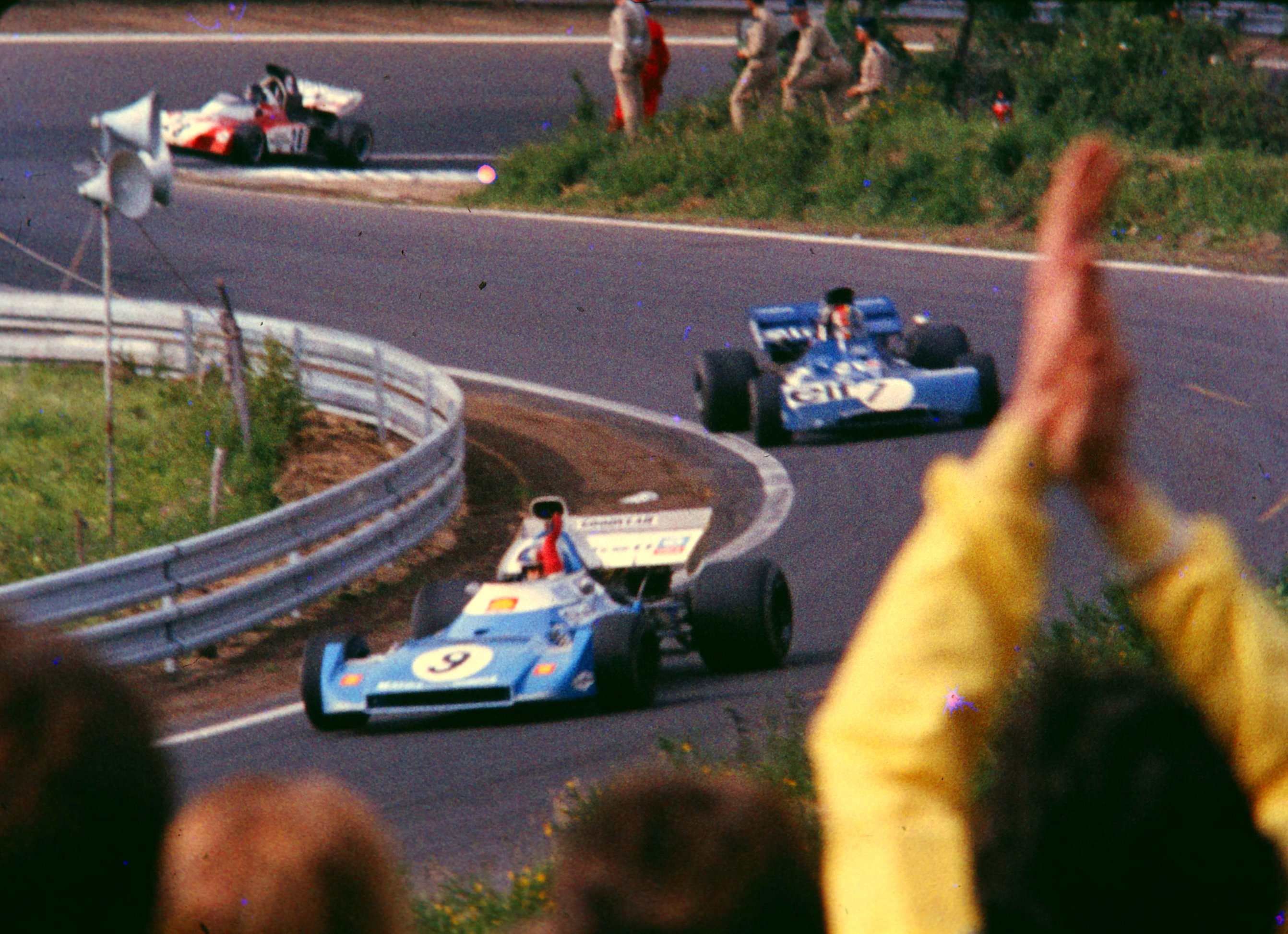
Chris Amon (bottom) started on pole position for the French Grand Prix.

The F1 circus moved down to France, where the French Grand Prix was held at the Circuit de Charade, a twisty and undulating 5.1 mi (8.2 km) stretch of public roads. While Stewart was back in his car, but his teammate Cevert was comfortably fastest in practice. He drove a new-spec Tyrrell chassis, until he crashed into the guard rail, injured his hand, and was left with the old-spec spare car. He would not be the last driver to spin or crash out, trying to get to grips with the challenging circuit. Matra had also brought an upgraded chassis and gave Chris Amon everything he needed to snatch pole position. Hulme and Stewart started behind him. As the race got underway, not much changed in terms of position, but Helmut Marko was hit in the eye by a stone flicked up by Jacky Ickx's Ferrari. He stopped by the side of the track and was rushed off to hospital. This would mean the end of his racing career. The rough dirt on the track resulted in more trouble: Amon got a flat left-front tyre and a 50-second pit stop left him in ninth position. But he put up a valiant fight and came home in third, behind winner Jackie Stewart and second-placed Emerson Fittipaldi.

Coming to Brands Hatch for the British Grand Prix, Denny Hulme, third in the championship, was recovering from a high-speed crash in the Can-Am race of the week before. He did drive but qualified down in eleventh. Stewart and Amon, heroes of the last race, both crashed in practice and qualified in their spare cars, fourth and seventeenth, respectively. Jacky Ickx got pole position ahead of Emerson Fittipaldi and Peter Revson. At the start, Jean-Pierre Beltoise jumped up to third but quickly started to hold up the pack, which meant that the front two created a big lead over the first few laps. But with Beltoise's retirement on lap 22 and the leaders having trouble getting past a backmarker, Jackie Stewart gradually closed up and, on lap 25, managed to overtake Fittipaldi. After the Brazilian got back past, the leading pack stayed in their respective order until Ickx's Ferrari started leaking oil and he had to retire on lap 49. Fittipaldi took the win ahead of Stewart and Revson, only the top three finishing on the lead lap. Ronnie Peterson was fourth until his engine and gearbox gave up, he crashed off the road and hit two cars that had retired at the same spot earlier in the race. Chris Amon finished in a surprising fourth position ahead of Denny Hulme.

In the drivers' championship, Emerson Fittipaldi (Lotus) led with 43 points, ahead of Jackie Stewart (Tyrrell) with 27 and Denny Hulme (McLaren) with 21. The manufacturers' championship saw Lotus in the lead with 43 points, ahead of Tyrrell with 33 and McLaren with 27.

=== Rounds 8 to 10 ===
The German Grand Prix was held at the most demanding circuit on the calendar: the infamous Nürburgring Nordschleife. In practice, Francois Cevert got air at Pflanzgarten corner and was one of four drivers to crash off the track. All escaped unhurt, but left their respective teams with a lot of repair work. The unofficial lap record was beaten by a full ten seconds on Friday and Ferrari's Jacky Ickx went another three seconds faster on Saturday to claim pole position, ahead of championship leaders Jackie Stewart and Emerson Fittipaldi. Ronnie Peterson started in fourth in his March but was second after the start. Clay Regazzoni (Ferrari) got up to third, while Stewart fell back behind Fittipaldi. After two laps of the 22.8 km (14.2 mi) circuit, Ickx was out of sight of his nearest challengers and kept setting new lap records. Fittipaldi got up to second, but Stewart was stuck in fifth place. When Peterson locked up, Regazzoni and Stewart got by, and they even gained another place when Fittipaldi's gearbox blew up and caused an engine fire. On lap 10, Henri Pescarolo suffered an enormous crash at Adenau corner but was unhurt. Ickx's engine was losing a bit of power due to a split exhaust manifold, but he won the race with almost a minute to spare. By leading every lap, he actually achieved a grand chelem. On the second-to-last lap, Stewart saw a chance to finally get past Regazzoni, but their wheels touched and the Scot crashed off. So the Ferraris finished 1-2 ahead of Peterson in the March.

The Austrian Grand Prix was held in really hot and sunny conditions. Fittipaldi scored pole position ahead of Regazzoni and Stewart. At the start of the race, they went three-wide into the first corner and it was Stewart who took the lead. Fittipaldi fell back to third but overtook Regazzoni when the Ferrari's engine sputtered. The Brazilian gradually closed up to the leader. On lap 23, the lead changed hands and Denny Hulme was challenging for second. Stewart's Tyrrell looked to have trouble with its rear suspension and the Scot would eventually finish seventh, over a minute down. Fittipaldi and Hulme fought a close battle, the Lotus crossing the line just over a second ahead of the McLaren. Hulme's teammate Peter Revson finished third.

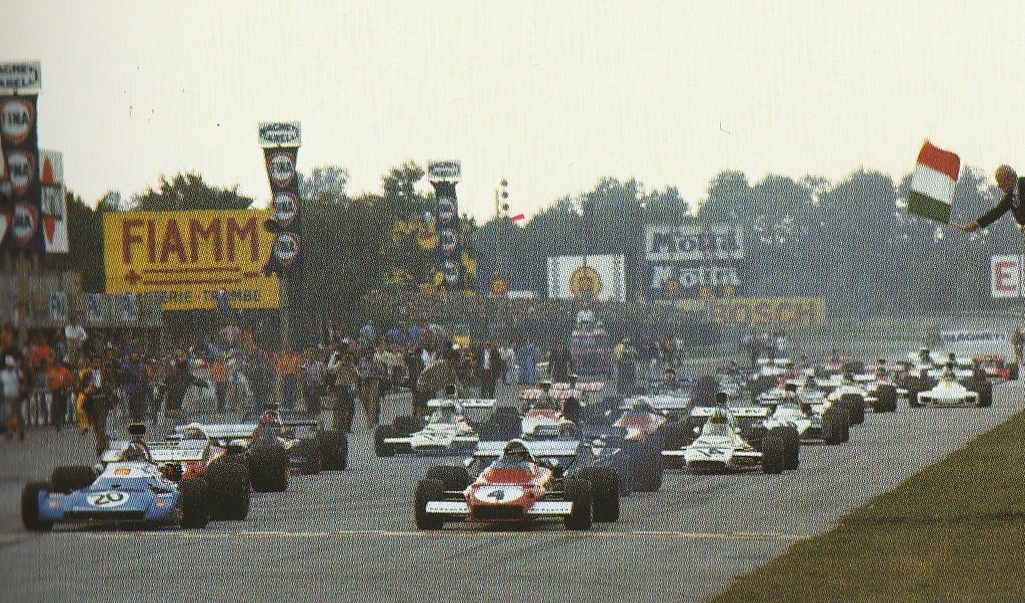
Start of the Italian Grand Prix

The European leg of the season concluded with the Italian Grand Prix at Monza. The circuit had been slowed down by two chicanes, so for once this year, earlier lap records would not be challenged. Jacky Ickx delighted the crowd with a pole position for Ferrari, just 0.04 seconds ahead of Chris Amon in the Matra. Stewart started third, Fittipaldi in sixth. However, seconds after the start, Stewart lost all drive from his engine and had to retire. Ickx and Amon had a trouble-free getaway, while dust on the track left the rest of the field blind into the first corner. No accidents happened but Niki Lauda retired, as the dust had clogged up his March's throttle system. Amon fell back to fifth place, promoting Regazzoni to second, and even to first when the Swiss driver passed his teammate for the lead. Francois Cevert retirement on lap 14 left Tyrrell's championships hopes seriously diminished. Regazzoni hit Carlos Pace when the Brazilian was recovering from a spin and both cars were out of the race. A lot of drivers retired, including Amon with overheating brakes and, on lap 46, leader Jacky Ickx with a failure of all the electrics. Fittipaldi took the win ahead of Hailwood in the Surtees and Hulme in the McLaren.

With an unsurmountable lead of 30 points over his nearest rival, Emerson Fittipaldi clinched the 1972 Drivers' Championship. At the age of 25, he was the youngest-ever World Champion, a record that would stand until 2005. Denny Hulme (McLaren) had overtaken Jackie Stewart (Tyrrell) in the championship, standing on 31 points compared to 27. Lotus secured the Manufacturers' Championship since McLaren and Tyrrell were now too far back.

=== Rounds 11 and 12 ===
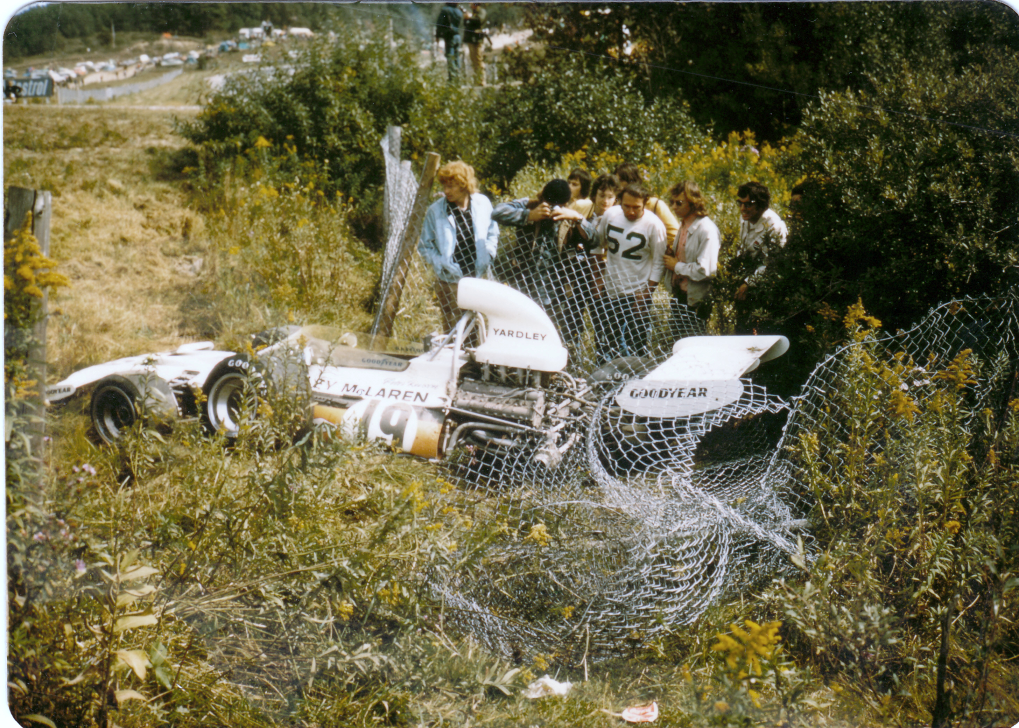
After securing pole position, Peter Revson crashed out of qualifying for the Canadian Grand Prix.

The McLaren drivers were already familiar with the Mosport International Raceway, host of the Canadian Grand Prix, thanks to their experience in Can-Am. They managed to secure a 1–2 on the grid, Peter Revson ahead of Denny Hulme, with a surprising Ronnie Peterson in third. And it was the Swede that actually reached the first corner first, while Hulme fell back when dirt clogged up his throttle. Coming to complete the first lap, Peterson almost crashed out, and after another mistake a few laps later, he lost the lead to Jackie Stewart. Champion Emerson Fittipaldi was challenging Revson for third. Peterson collided with Graham Hill when trying to lap him. He stopped with a bent steering column and was pushed into the pits. When he rejoined, he found Hill and made clear that the Brit knew how he felt. Peterson was later disqualified for the push up the pits. Fittipaldi fell back with damage to the nose of his car, so on the podium stood Stewart, Revson and Hulme.

Coming to the final race of the championship, the United States Grand Prix, Stewart was determined to show that the loss of the title did not mean a loss of form, and it would be one of the most convincing wins of his career, achieving a hat-trick of pole position, fastest lap and victory. Revson and Hulme started second and third for McLaren. At the start, Revson was caught up in a collision with Regazzoni and Reutemann, so Hulme was up to second and Fittipaldi up to third. Future champion Jody Scheckter was running fourth in his debut race and actually went past the freshly crowned Brazilian, but when a sudden shower arrived, he spun off at the first corner. Stewart was now leading 40 seconds ahead of his teammate Francois Cevert, and then the McLaren of Hulme.

Emerson Fittipaldi finished on top of the standings with 61 points, ahead of Jackie Stewart with 45 and Denny Hulme with 39. In the Manufacturers' Championship, Lotus were first with 61 points. Tyrrell were now second (51), having just overtaken McLaren (47).

== Results and standings ==
=== Grands Prix ===
Round	Grand Prix	Pole position	Fastest lap	Winning driver	Winning constructor	Tyre	Report
1	(Argentina) Argentine Grand Prix	(Argentina) Carlos Reutemann	(United Kingdom) Jackie Stewart	(United Kingdom) Jackie Stewart	(United Kingdom) Tyrrell-Ford	G	Report
2	(South Africa) South African Grand Prix	(United Kingdom) Jackie Stewart	(United Kingdom) Mike Hailwood	(New Zealand) Denny Hulme	(United Kingdom) McLaren-Ford	G	Report
3	(Spain) Spanish Grand Prix	(Belgium) Jacky Ickx	(Belgium) Jacky Ickx	(Brazil) Emerson Fittipaldi	(United Kingdom) Lotus-Ford	F	Report
4	Monaco Grand Prix	(Brazil) Emerson Fittipaldi	(France) Jean-Pierre Beltoise	(France) Jean-Pierre Beltoise	(United Kingdom) BRM	F	Report
5	(Belgium) Belgian Grand Prix	(Brazil) Emerson Fittipaldi	(New Zealand) Chris Amon	(Brazil) Emerson Fittipaldi	(United Kingdom) Lotus-Ford	F	Report
6	(France) French Grand Prix	(New Zealand) Chris Amon	(New Zealand) Chris Amon	(United Kingdom) Jackie Stewart	(United Kingdom) Tyrrell-Ford	G	Report
7	(United Kingdom) British Grand Prix	(Belgium) Jacky Ickx	(United Kingdom) Jackie Stewart	(Brazil) Emerson Fittipaldi	(United Kingdom) Lotus-Ford	F	Report
8	(West Germany) German Grand Prix	(Belgium) Jacky Ickx	(Belgium) Jacky Ickx	(Belgium) Jacky Ickx	(Italy) Ferrari	F	Report
9	(Austria) Austrian Grand Prix	(Brazil) Emerson Fittipaldi	(New Zealand) Denny Hulme	(Brazil) Emerson Fittipaldi	(United Kingdom) Lotus-Ford	F	Report
10	(Italy) Italian Grand Prix	(Belgium) Jacky Ickx	(Belgium) Jacky Ickx	(Brazil) Emerson Fittipaldi	(United Kingdom) Lotus-Ford	F	Report
11	(Canada) Canadian Grand Prix	(United States) Peter Revson	(United Kingdom) Jackie Stewart	(United Kingdom) Jackie Stewart	(United Kingdom) Tyrrell-Ford	G	Report
12	United States Grand Prix	(United Kingdom) Jackie Stewart	(United Kingdom) Jackie Stewart	(United Kingdom) Jackie Stewart	(United Kingdom) Tyrrell-Ford	G	Report

=== Scoring system ===
Points were awarded to the top six classified finishers. The International Cup for F1 Manufacturers only counted the points of the highest-finishing driver for each race. For both the Championship and the Cup, the best five results from rounds 1–6 and the best five results from rounds 7–12 were counted.

Numbers without parentheses are championship points; numbers in parentheses are total points scored. Points were awarded in the following system:

Position	1st	2nd	3rd	4th	5th	6th
Race	9	6	4	3	2	1

=== World Drivers' Championship standings ===
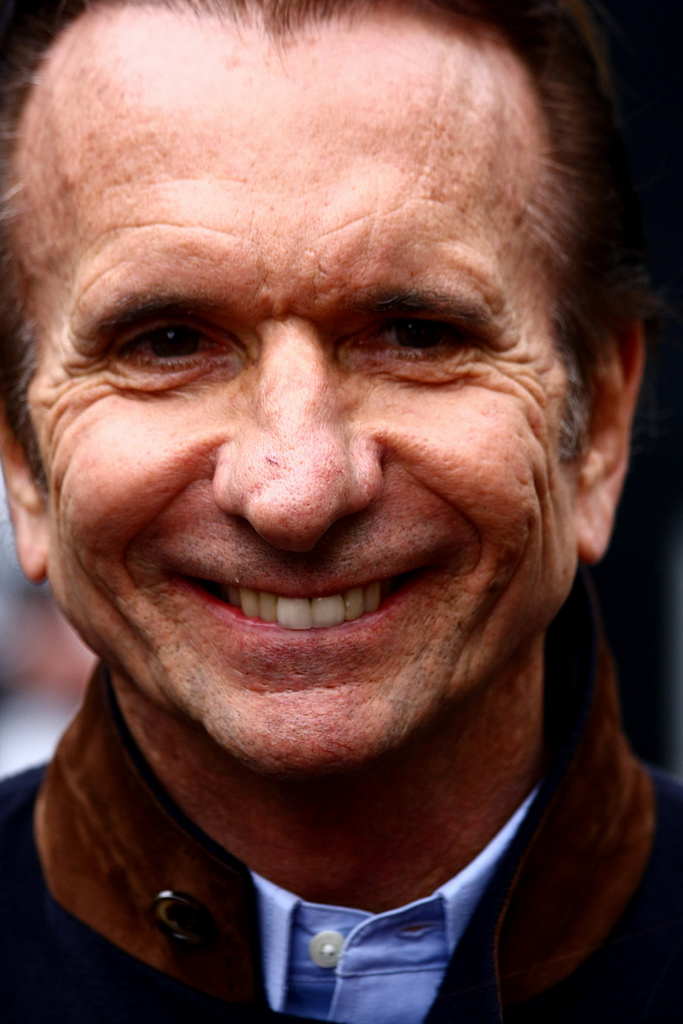
Emerson Fittipaldi (pictured in 2008) won the Drivers' Championship, driving for Lotus

Pos	Driver	ARG (Argentina)	RSA (South Africa)	ESP (Spain)	MON (Monaco)	BEL (Belgium)	FRA (France)	GBR (United Kingdom)	GER (West Germany)	AUT (Austria)	ITA (Italy)	CAN (Canada)	USA (United States)	Points
1	(Brazil) Emerson Fittipaldi	Ret	2	1	3^{P}	1^{P}	2	1	Ret	1^{P}	1	11	Ret	61
2	(United Kingdom) Jackie Stewart	1^{F}	Ret^{P}	Ret	4		1	2^{F}	11	7	Ret	1^{F}	1^{P}^{F}	45
3	(New Zealand) Denny Hulme	2	1	Ret	15	3	7	5	Ret	2^{F}	3	3	3	39
4	(Belgium) Jacky Ickx	3	8	2^{P}^{F}	2	Ret	11	Ret^{P}	1^{P}^{F}	Ret	Ret^{P}^{F}	12	5	27
5	(United States) Peter Revson	Ret	3	5		7		3		3	4	2^{P}	18	23
6	(France) François Cevert	Ret	9	Ret	NC	2	4	Ret	10	9	Ret	Ret	2	15
7	(Switzerland) Clay Regazzoni	4	12	3	Ret	Ret			2	Ret	Ret	5	8	15
8	(United Kingdom) Mike Hailwood		Ret^{F}	Ret	Ret	4	6	Ret	Ret	4	2		17	13
9	(Sweden) Ronnie Peterson	6	5	Ret	11	9	5	7	3	12	9	DSQ	4	12
10	(New Zealand) Chris Amon	DNS	15	Ret	6	6^{F}	3^{P}^{F}	4	15	5	Ret	6	15	12
11	(France) Jean-Pierre Beltoise		Ret	Ret	1^{F}	Ret	15	11	9	8	8	Ret	Ret	9
12	(United States) Mario Andretti	Ret	4	Ret							7		6	4
13	(New Zealand) Howden Ganley	9	NC	Ret	Ret	8	DNS		4	6	11	10	Ret	4
14	(United Kingdom) Brian Redman				5		9		5				Ret	4
15	(United Kingdom) Graham Hill	Ret	6	10	12	Ret	10	Ret	6	Ret	5	8	11	4
16	(Argentina) Carlos Reutemann	7^{P}	Ret			13	12	8	Ret	Ret	Ret	4	Ret	3
17	(Italy) Andrea de Adamich	Ret	NC	4	7	Ret	14	Ret	13	14	Ret	Ret	Ret	3
18	(Brazil) Carlos Pace		17	6	17	5	Ret	Ret	NC	NC	Ret	9	Ret	3
19	(Australia) Tim Schenken	5	Ret	8	Ret	Ret	17	Ret	14	11	Ret	7	Ret	2
20	(Italy) Arturo Merzario							6	12					1
21	(United Kingdom) Peter Gethin	Ret	NC	Ret	Ret	Ret	DNS	Ret		13	6	Ret	Ret	1
—	(Brazil) Wilson Fittipaldi			7	9	Ret	8	12	7	Ret	Ret	Ret	Ret	0
—	(Austria) Niki Lauda	11	7	Ret	16	12	Ret	9	Ret	10	13	DSQ	NC	0
—	(France) Patrick Depailler						NC						7	0
—	(Austria) Helmut Marko	10	14		8	10	Ret							0
—	(United Kingdom) Mike Beuttler			DNQ	13	Ret	19	13	8	Ret	10	NC	13	0
—	(France) Henri Pescarolo	8	11	11	Ret	NC	DNS	Ret	Ret	DNS	DNQ	13	14	0
—	(Australia) David Walker	DSQ	10	9	14	14	18	Ret	Ret	Ret			Ret	0
—	(South Africa) Jody Scheckter												9	0
—	(West Germany) Rolf Stommelen		13	Ret	10	11	16	10	Ret	15				0
—	(Sweden) Reine Wisell	Ret		Ret	Ret		Ret		Ret		12	Ret	10	0
—	(United States) Sam Posey												12	0
—	(Italy) Nanni Galli					Ret	13	Ret		NC	Ret			0
—	(United States) Skip Barber											NC	16	0
—	(Rhodesia) John Love		16											0
—	(South Africa) Dave Charlton		Ret				DNQ	Ret	Ret					0
—	(United Kingdom) Derek Bell						DNS		Ret		DNQ	DNS	Ret	0
—	(Spain) Alex Soler-Roig	Ret		Ret										0
—	(United Kingdom) Jackie Oliver							Ret						0
—	(France) François Migault							DNS		Ret				0
—	(United Kingdom) John Surtees										Ret		DNS	0
—	(Canada) Bill Brack											Ret		0
—	(South Africa) William Ferguson		DNS											0
—	(Australia) Vern Schuppan					DNS								0
Pos	Driver	ARG (Argentina)	RSA (South Africa)	ESP (Spain)	MON (Monaco)	BEL (Belgium)	FRA (France)	GBR (United Kingdom)	GER (West Germany)	AUT (Austria)	ITA (Italy)	CAN (Canada)	USA (United States)	Points

Key
Colour	Result
Gold	Winner
Silver	Second place
Bronze	Third place
Green	Other points position
Blue	Other classified position
Blue	Not classified, finished (NC)
Purple	Not classified, retired (Ret)
Red	Did not qualify (DNQ)
Black	Disqualified (DSQ)
White	Did not start (DNS)
White	Race cancelled (C)
Blank	Did not practice (DNP)
Blank	Excluded (EX)
Blank	Did not arrive (DNA)
Blank	Withdrawn (WD)
Blank	Did not enter (empty cell)
Annotation	Meaning
P	Pole position
F	Fastest lap

=== International Cup for F1 Manufacturers standings ===
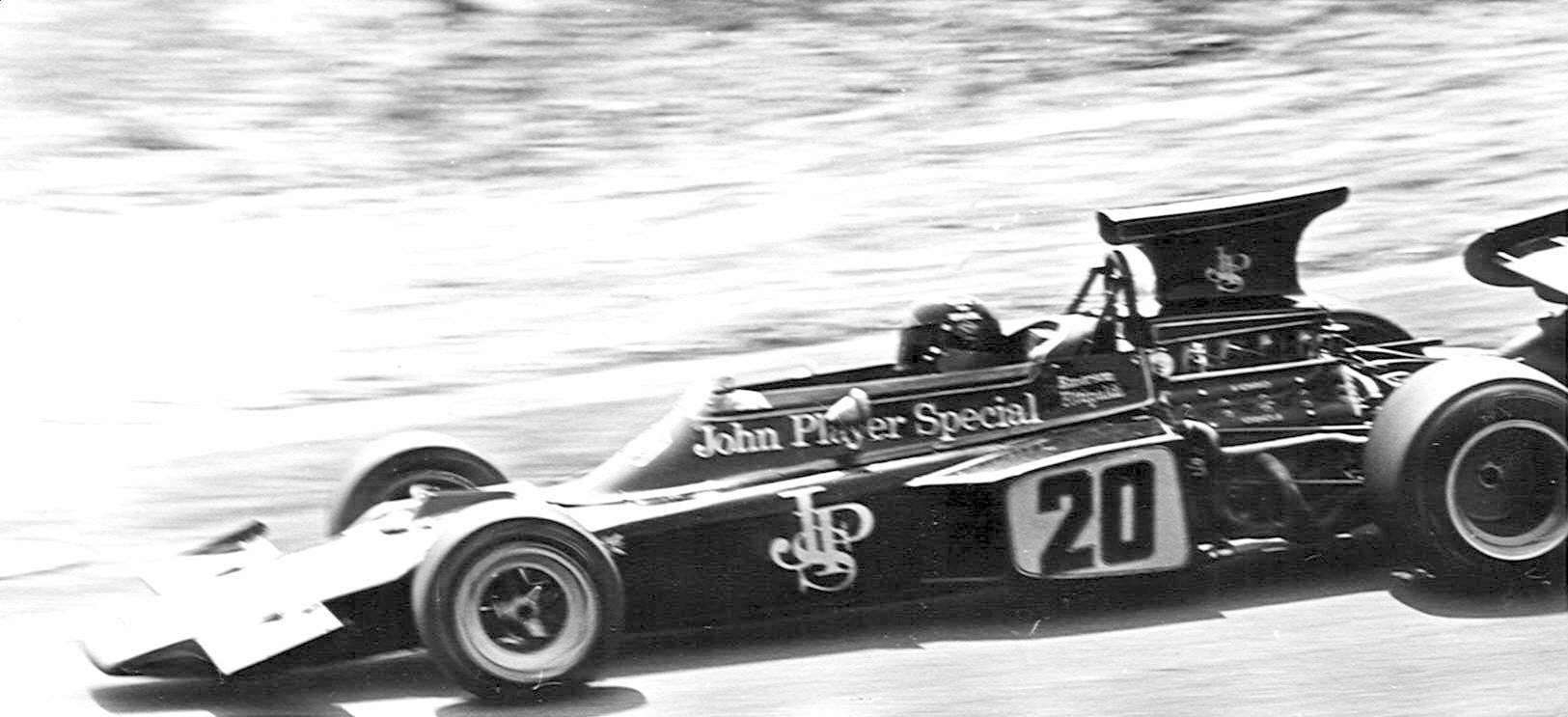
Lotus-Ford won the International Cup for F1 Manufacturers

Pos.	Manufacturer	ARG (Argentina)	RSA (South Africa)	ESP (Spain)	MON (Monaco)	BEL (Belgium)	FRA (France)	GBR (United Kingdom)	GER (West Germany)	AUT (Austria)	ITA (Italy)	CAN (Canada)	USA (United States)	Pts.
1	(United Kingdom) Lotus-Ford	Ret	2	1	3	1	2	1	Ret	1	1	11	10	61
2	(United Kingdom) Tyrrell-Ford	1	9	Ret	4	2	1	2	10	7	Ret	1	1	51
3	(United Kingdom) McLaren-Ford	2	1	5	5	3	7	3	(5)	2	3	2	3	47 (49)
4	(Italy) Ferrari	3	4	2	2	Ret	11	6	1	Ret	7	5	5	33
5	(United Kingdom) Surtees-Ford	5	16	4	7	4	6	Ret	13	4	2	7	12	18
6	(United Kingdom) March-Ford	6	5	6	11	5	5	7	3	10	9	9	4	15
7	(United Kingdom) BRM	9	14	Ret	1	8	15	11	4	6	6	10	Ret	14
8	(France) Matra	DNS	15	Ret	6	6	3	4	15	5	Ret	6	15	12
9	(United Kingdom) Brabham-Ford	7	6	7	9	13	8	8	6	Ret	5	4	11	7
—	(West Germany) Eifelland-Ford		13	Ret	10	11	16	10	Ret	15				0
—	(Italy) Tecno					Ret	DNS	Ret	Ret	NC	Ret	DNS	Ret	0
—	(United Kingdom) Politoys-Ford							Ret						0
—	(United Kingdom) Connew-Ford							DNS		Ret				0
Pos.	Manufacturer	ARG (Argentina)	RSA (South Africa)	ESP (Spain)	MON (Monaco)	BEL (Belgium)	FRA (France)	GBR (United Kingdom)	GER (West Germany)	AUT (Austria)	ITA (Italy)	CAN (Canada)	USA (United States)	Pts.

- Bold results counted to championship totals.

== Non-championship races ==
Other Formula One races were also held in 1972, which did not count towards the World Championship.

Race name	Circuit	Date	Winning driver	Constructor	Report
(United Kingdom) VII Race of Champions	Brands Hatch	19 March	(Brazil) Emerson Fittipaldi	(United Kingdom) Lotus-Cosworth	Report
(Brazil) I Brazilian Grand Prix	Interlagos	30 March	(Argentina) Carlos Reutemann	(United Kingdom) Brabham-Cosworth	Report
(United Kingdom) XXIV BRDC International Trophy	Silverstone	23 April	(Brazil) Emerson Fittipaldi	(United Kingdom) Lotus-Cosworth	Report
(United Kingdom) XIX International Gold Cup	Oulton Park	29 May	(New Zealand) Denny Hulme	(United Kingdom) McLaren-Cosworth	Report
(Italy) I Italian Republic Grand Prix	Vallelunga	18 June	(Brazil) Emerson Fittipaldi	(United Kingdom) Lotus-Cosworth	Report
(United Kingdom) II World Championship Victory Race	Brands Hatch	22 October	(France) Jean-Pierre Beltoise	(United Kingdom) BRM	Report
