= 1973 Spanish Grand Prix =

- The Montjuïc Circuit (1966–1975)

Race details
- Date: 29 April 1973
- Location: Montjuïc Circuit, Montjuïc, Barcelona, Catalonia, Spain
- Course: Street Circuit
- Course length: 3.791 km (2.356 miles)
- Distance: 75 laps, 284.325 km (176.671 miles)
- Weather: Sunny, Hot, Dry

Pole position
Driver	(Sweden) Ronnie Peterson	Lotus-Ford
- Time: 1:21.8

Fastest lap
Driver	(Sweden) Ronnie Peterson	Lotus-Ford
- Time: 1:23.8 on lap 13

Podium
First	(Brazil) Emerson Fittipaldi	Lotus-Ford
Second	(France) François Cevert	Tyrrell-Ford
Third	(United States) George Follmer	Shadow-Ford

The 1973 Spanish Grand Prix was a Formula One motor race held at Montjuïc Circuit on 29 April 1973. It was race 4 of 15 in both the 1973 World Championship of Drivers and the 1973 International Cup for Formula One Manufacturers. The 75-lap race was won by Lotus driver Emerson Fittipaldi after he started from seventh position. François Cevert finished second for the Tyrrell team and Shadow driver George Follmer came in third, scoring his only podium finish in Formula One.

== Classification ==
=== Qualifying ===
Pos	No	Driver	Constructor	Time	Gap	Grid
1	2	(Sweden) Ronnie Peterson	Lotus-Ford	1:21.8	—	1
2	5	(New Zealand) Denny Hulme	McLaren-Ford	1:22.5	+0.7	2
3	4	(France) François Cevert	Tyrrell-Ford	1:22.7	+0.8	3
4	3	(United Kingdom) Jackie Stewart	Tyrrell-Ford	1:23.2	+1.4	4
5	6	(United States) Peter Revson	McLaren-Ford	1:23.4	+1.6	5
6	7	(Belgium) Jacky Ickx	Ferrari	1:23.5	+1.7	6
7	1	(Brazil) Emerson Fittipaldi	Lotus-Ford	1:23.7	+1.9	7
8	14	(Switzerland) Clay Regazzoni	BRM	1:23.7	+1.9	8
9	9	(United Kingdom) Mike Hailwood	Surtees-Ford	1:24.2	+2.4	PL
10	15	(France) Jean-Pierre Beltoise	BRM	1:24.2	+2.4	10
11	16	(Austria) Niki Lauda	BRM	1:24.3	+2.5	11
12	17	(Brazil) Wilson Fittipaldi	Brabham-Ford	1:24.5	+2.7	12
13	19	(United Kingdom) Jackie Oliver	Shadow-Ford	1:24.6	+2.8	13
14	20	(United States) George Follmer	Shadow-Ford	1:24.7	+2.9	14
15	18	(Argentina) Carlos Reutemann	Brabham-Ford	1:24.7	+2.9	15
16	10	(Brazil) Carlos Pace	Surtees-Ford	1:25.0	+3.2	16
17	21	(Italy) Andrea de Adamich	Brabham-Ford	1:25.2	+3.4	17
18	11	(France) Henri Pescarolo	March-Ford	1:26.1	+4.3	18
19	12	(United Kingdom) Mike Beuttler	March-Ford	1:26.2	+4.4	19
20	24	(Italy) Nanni Galli	Iso-Marlboro-Ford	1:26.3	+4.5	20
21	23	(New Zealand) Howden Ganley	Iso-Marlboro-Ford	1:26.5	+4.7	21
22	25	(United Kingdom) Graham Hill	Shadow-Ford	1:30.3	+8.5	22

=== Race ===
Pos	No	Driver	Constructor	Laps	Time/Retired	Grid	Points
1	1	(Brazil) Emerson Fittipaldi	Lotus-Ford	75	1:48:18.7	7	9
2	4	(France) François Cevert	Tyrrell-Ford	75	+ 42.7	3	6
3	20	(United States) George Follmer	Shadow-Ford	75	+ 1:13.1	14	4
4	6	(United States) Peter Revson	McLaren-Ford	74	+1 Lap	5	3
5	15	(France) Jean-Pierre Beltoise	BRM	74	+1 Lap	10	2
6	5	(New Zealand) Denny Hulme	McLaren-Ford	74	+1 Lap	2	1
7	12	(United Kingdom) Mike Beuttler	March-Ford	74	+1 Lap	19	
8	11	(France) Henri Pescarolo	March-Ford	73	+2 Laps	18	
9	14	(Switzerland) Clay Regazzoni	BRM	69	+6 Laps	8	
10	17	(Brazil) Wilson Fittipaldi	Brabham-Ford	69	+6 Laps	12	
11	24	(Italy) Nanni Galli	Iso-Marlboro-Ford	69	+6 Laps	20	
12	7	(Belgium) Jacky Ickx	Ferrari	69	+6 Laps	6	
Ret	18	(Argentina) Carlos Reutemann	Brabham-Ford	66	Halfshaft	15	
Ret	23	(New Zealand) Howden Ganley	Iso-Marlboro-Ford	63	Out of Fuel	21	
Ret	2	(Sweden) Ronnie Peterson	Lotus-Ford	56	Gearbox	1	
Ret	3	(United Kingdom) Jackie Stewart	Tyrrell-Ford	47	Brakes	4	
Ret	16	(Austria) Niki Lauda	BRM	28	Tyre	11	
Ret	25	(United Kingdom) Graham Hill	Shadow-Ford	27	Brakes	22	
Ret	9	(United Kingdom) Mike Hailwood	Surtees-Ford	25	Oil Leak	PL	
Ret	19	(United Kingdom) Jackie Oliver	Shadow-Ford	23	Engine	13	
Ret	21	(Italy) Andrea de Adamich	Brabham-Ford	17	Wheel	17	
Ret	10	(Brazil) Carlos Pace	Surtees-Ford	13	Halfshaft	16	

== Notes ==
- This was the first fastest lap set by Ronnie Peterson and by a Swedish driver.
- This was the 50th Grand Prix win by Lotus, breaking the old record set by Ferrari at the 1972 German Grand Prix.
- This was the first podium finish for American driver George Fullmer and for American-British constructor Shadow.

== Championship standings after the race ==
Drivers' Championship standings

	Pos	Driver	Points
	1	(Brazil) Emerson Fittipaldi	31
	2	(United Kingdom) Jackie Stewart	19
2	3	(France) François Cevert	12
	4	(United States) Peter Revson	9
2	5	(New Zealand) Denny Hulme	9

Constructors' Championship standings

	Pos	Constructor	Points
	1	(United Kingdom) Lotus-Ford	31
	2	(United Kingdom) Tyrrell-Ford	27
	3	(United Kingdom) McLaren-Ford	15
	4	(Italy) Ferrari	9
2	5	(United Kingdom) Shadow-Ford	5

- Note: Only the top five positions are included for both sets of standings.

Previous race: 1973 South African Grand Prix	FIA Formula One World Championship; 1973 season	Next race: 1973 Belgian Grand Prix
Previous race: 1972 Spanish Grand Prix	Spanish Grand Prix	Next race: 1974 Spanish Grand Prix
