= 1972 Spanish Grand Prix =

- Jarama Permanent Circuit (1967–1990)

Race details
- Date: May 1, 1972
- Official name: XVIII Gran Premio de España
- Location: Circuito Permanente del Jarama, Madrid, Spain
- Course: Race track
- Course length: 3.404 km (2.115 miles)
- Distance: 90 laps, 306.360 km (190.363 miles)

Pole position
Driver	(Belgium) Jacky Ickx	Ferrari
- Time: 1:18.43

Fastest lap
Driver	(Belgium) Jacky Ickx	Ferrari
- Time: 1:21.01 on lap 52

Podium
First	(Brazil) Emerson Fittipaldi	Lotus-Ford
Second	(Belgium) Jacky Ickx	Ferrari
Third	(Switzerland) Clay Regazzoni	Ferrari

The 1972 Spanish Grand Prix was a Formula One motor race held at Jarama on May 1, 1972. It was race 3 of 12 in both the 1972 World Championship of Drivers and the 1972 International Cup for Formula One Manufacturers. The race marked the first time two brothers raced together in F1 simultaneously, Emerson and Wilson Fittipaldi. The elder Fittipaldi was a last-minute substitute for Brabham's Carlos Reutemann, who had injured his ankle in a Formula 2 race the previous weekend at Thruxton, England. The 90-lap race was won by Lotus driver Emerson Fittipaldi after he started from third position. Jacky Ickx finished second for the Ferrari team and his teammate Clay Regazzoni came in third. After the race the World Drivers' Championship was tied at 15 points between Emerson Fittipaldi and Denny Hulme.

== Qualifying classification ==
Pos.	No.	Driver	Constructor	Time	Gap
1	4	(Belgium) Jacky Ickx	Ferrari	1:18.43	
2	11	(New Zealand) Denny Hulme	McLaren-Ford	1:19.18	+0.75
3	5	(Brazil) Emerson Fittipaldi	Lotus-Ford	1:19.26	+0.83
4	1	(United Kingdom) Jackie Stewart	Tyrrell-Ford	1:19.33	+0.90
5	7	(United States) Mario Andretti	Ferrari	1:19.39	+0.96
6	9	(New Zealand) Chris Amon	Matra	1:19.52	+1.09
7	19	(France) Jean-Pierre Beltoise	BRM	1:19.57	+1.14
8	6	(Switzerland) Clay Regazzoni	Ferrari	1:19.71	+1.28
9	2	(Sweden) Ronnie Peterson	March-Ford	1:19.86	+1.43
10	10	(Sweden) Reine Wisell	BRM	1:19.89	+1.46
11	20	(United States) Peter Revson	McLaren-Ford	1:20.11	+1.68
12	3	(France) François Cevert	Tyrrell-Ford	1:20.50	+2.07
13	26	(Italy) Andrea de Adamich	Surtees-Ford	1:20.79	+2.36
14	22	(Brazil) Wilson Fittipaldi	Brabham-Ford	1:20.83	+2.40
15	15	(United Kingdom) Mike Hailwood	Surtees-Ford	1:20.97	+2.54
16	29	(Brazil) Carlos Pace	March-Ford	1:21.00	+2.57
17	16	(West Germany) Rolf Stommelen	Eifelland-Ford	1:21.04	+2.61
18	12	(Australia) Tim Schenken	Surtees-Ford	1:21.06	+2.63
19	14	(France) Henri Pescarolo	March-Ford	1:21.24	+2.81
20	25	(New Zealand) Howden Ganley	BRM	1:21.43	+3.00
21	8	(United Kingdom) Peter Gethin	BRM	1:22.43	+4.00
22	28	(Spain) Alex Soler-Roig	BRM	1:22.57	+4.14
23	18	(United Kingdom) Graham Hill	Brabham-Ford	1:22.59	+4.16
24	21	(Australia) David Walker	Lotus-Ford	1:22.74	+4.31
25	24	(Austria) Niki Lauda	March-Ford	1:24.96	+6.53
DNQ	23	(United Kingdom) Mike Beuttler	March-Ford	1:25.48	+7.05

== Classification ==
Pos	No	Driver	Constructor	Laps	Time/Retired	Grid	Points
1	5	(Brazil) Emerson Fittipaldi	Lotus-Ford	90	2:03:41.2	3	9
2	4	(Belgium) Jacky Ickx	Ferrari	90	+ 18.92	1	6
3	6	(Switzerland) Clay Regazzoni	Ferrari	89	+ 1 Lap	8	4
4	26	(Italy) Andrea de Adamich	Surtees-Ford	89	+ 1 Lap	13	3
5	20	(United States) Peter Revson	McLaren-Ford	89	+ 1 Lap	11	2
6	29	(Brazil) Carlos Pace	March-Ford	89	+ 1 Lap	16	1
7	22	(Brazil) Wilson Fittipaldi, jr.	Brabham-Ford	88	+ 2 Laps	14	
8	12	(Australia) Tim Schenken	Surtees-Ford	88	+ 2 Laps	18	
9	21	(Australia) Dave Walker	Lotus-Ford	87	Out of Fuel	24	
10	18	(United Kingdom) Graham Hill	Brabham-Ford	86	+ 4 Laps	23	
11	14	(France) Henri Pescarolo	March-Ford	86	+ 4 Laps	19	
Ret	1	(United Kingdom) Jackie Stewart	Tyrrell-Ford	69	Accident	4	
Ret	9	(New Zealand) Chris Amon	Matra	66	Gearbox	6	
Ret	3	(France) François Cevert	Tyrrell-Ford	65	Ignition	12	
Ret	8	(United Kingdom) Peter Gethin	BRM	65	Engine	21	
Ret	11	(New Zealand) Denny Hulme	McLaren-Ford	48	Gearbox	2	
Ret	25	(New Zealand) Howden Ganley	BRM	38	Engine	20	
Ret	10	(Sweden) Reine Wisell	BRM	24	Accident	10	
Ret	7	(United States) Mario Andretti	Ferrari	23	Oil Pressure	5	
Ret	15	(United Kingdom) Mike Hailwood	Surtees-Ford	20	Electrical	15	
Ret	2	(Sweden) Ronnie Peterson	March-Ford	16	Fuel Leak	9	
Ret	16	(Germany) Rolf Stommelen	Eifelland-Ford	15	Accident	17	
Ret	19	(France) Jean-Pierre Beltoise	BRM	9	Gearbox	7	
Ret	24	(Austria) Niki Lauda	March-Ford	7	Differential	25	
Ret	28	(Spain) Alex Soler-Roig	BRM	6	Accident	22	
DNQ	23	(United Kingdom) Mike Beuttler	March-Ford				

== Notes ==
- This was the Formula One World Championship debut for Brazilian driver Wilson Fittipaldi, jr.
- This was the 10th pole position for a Belgian driver.
- This was the 2nd win of a Spanish Grand Prix by Lotus. It broke the old record set by Alfa Romeo at the 1951 Spanish Grand Prix.
- This race was the 200th Formula One World Championship Grand Prix, excluding the eleven Indianapolis 500 races that were held between 1950 and 1960. In those 200 races:
  - Graham Hill was the most experienced, having raced 138 of them, but also having the most retirements at 63.
  - Jim Clark had achieved 33 pole positions, 28 fastest laps, and 25 Grands Prix wins. Graham Hill held the record of the highest amount of podium finishes at 36, and Juan Manuel Fangio held a record 5 World Championships.
  - Ferrari was the most constant constructor and engine supplier, having raced 190 of them (188 as a constructor), BRM had had a record 31 retirements as a constructor. A Ferrari-powered car had retired the race a record 28 times.
  - Ferrari also achieved 57 pole positions, 55 fastest laps, 48 Grands Prix wins, 180 podium places and 6 Drivers' World Titles in this timespan (as a constructor and engine supplier) . Lotus held the record for most Constructor's World Championships at 5.
  - British engine supplier Cosworth (funded by Ford) had achieved 5 Constructors' World Titles.
- As of 2026, this is the latest Formula 1 race to have been held on a Monday.

== Championship standings after the race ==
Drivers' Championship standings

	Pos	Driver	Points
	1	(New Zealand) Denny Hulme	15
1	2	(Brazil) Emerson Fittipaldi	15
1	3	(Belgium) Jacky Ickx	10
2	4	(United Kingdom) Jackie Stewart	9
1	5	(Switzerland) Clay Regazzoni	7

Constructors' Championship standings

	Pos	Constructor	Points
	1	(United Kingdom) McLaren-Ford	17
2	2	(United Kingdom) Lotus-Ford	15
	3	(Italy) Ferrari	13
2	4	(United Kingdom) Tyrrell-Ford	9
1	5	(United Kingdom) Surtees-Ford	5

- Note: Only the top five positions are included for both sets of standings.

Previous race: 1972 South African Grand Prix	FIA Formula One World Championship; 1972 season	Next race: 1972 Monaco Grand Prix
Previous race: 1971 Spanish Grand Prix	Spanish Grand Prix	Next race: 1973 Spanish Grand Prix
