= 1972 Austrian Grand Prix =

- The Österreichring (in 1972)

Race details
- Date: 13 August 1972
- Official name: X Großer Preis von Osterreich
- Location: Österreichring, Spielberg, Styria, Austria
- Course: Permanent racing facility
- Course length: 5.911 km (3.673 miles)
- Distance: 54 laps, 317.347 km (198.686 miles)
- Weather: Sunny, hot

Pole position
Driver	(Brazil) Emerson Fittipaldi	Lotus-Ford
- Time: 1:35.97

Fastest lap
Driver	(New Zealand) Denny Hulme	McLaren-Ford
- Time: 1:38.32 on lap 47

Podium
First	(Brazil) Emerson Fittipaldi	Lotus-Ford
Second	(New Zealand) Denny Hulme	McLaren-Ford
Third	(United States) Peter Revson	McLaren-Ford

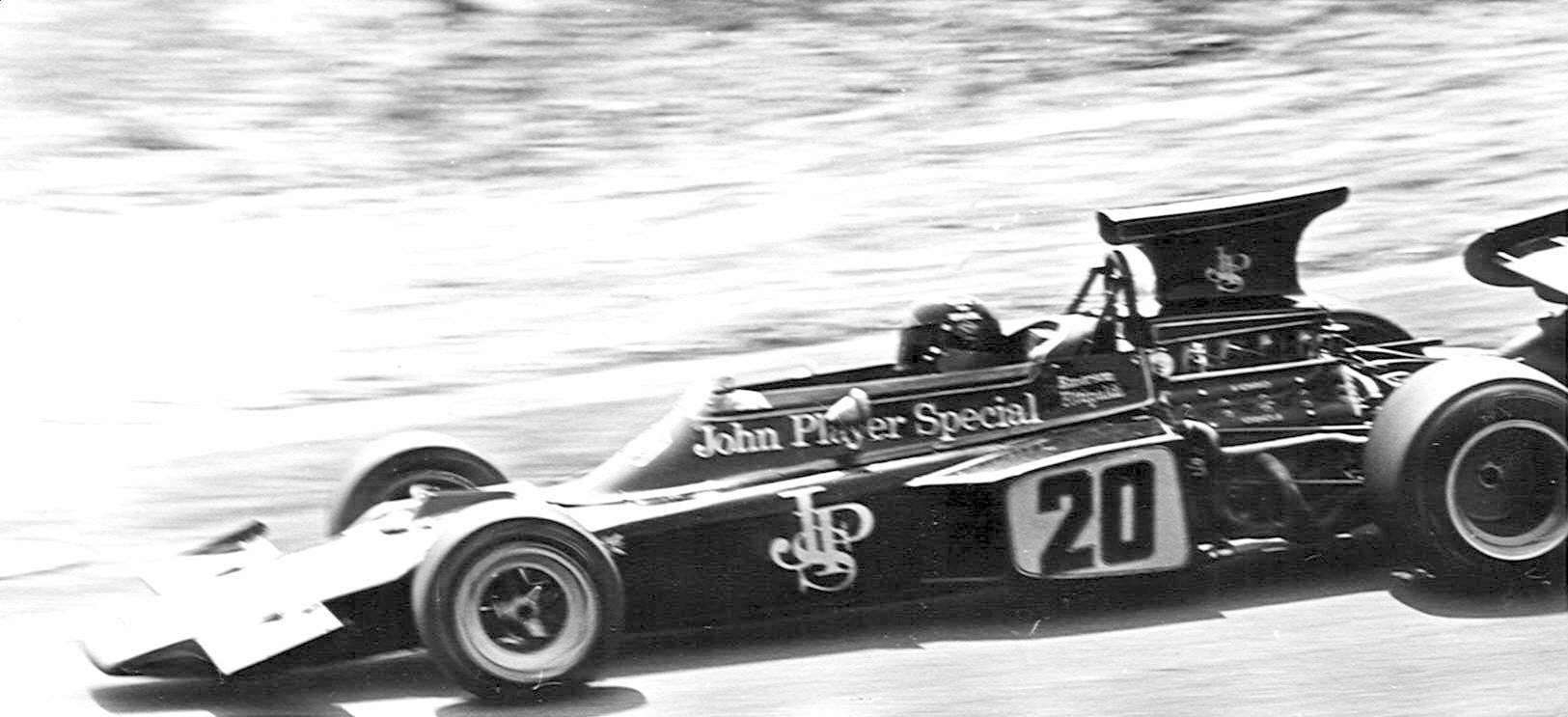
Emerson Fittipaldi driving his Lotus during practice; he won the race using the team's spare car which carried the number 31.

The 1972 Austrian Grand Prix was a Formula One motor race held at Österreichring on 13 August 1972. It was race 9 of 12 in both the 1972 World Championship of Drivers and the 1972 International Cup for Formula One Manufacturers. The 54-lap race was won by Lotus driver Emerson Fittipaldi after he started from pole position. Denny Hulme finished second for the McLaren team and his teammate Peter Revson came in third.

== Qualifying ==
=== Qualifying classification ===
Pos.	No	Driver	Constructor	Time	Gap	Grid
1	31	(Brazil) Emerson Fittipaldi	Lotus-Ford	1:35.97		1
2	19	(Switzerland) Clay Regazzoni	Ferrari	1:36.04	+ 0.07	2
3	1	(United Kingdom) Jackie Stewart	Tyrrell-Ford	1:36.35	+ 0.38	3
4	14	(United States) Peter Revson	McLaren-Ford	1:36.63	+ 0.66	4
5	17	(Argentina) Carlos Reutemann	Brabham–Ford	1:37.15	+ 1.18	5
6	10	(New Zealand) Chris Amon	Matra	1:37.16	+ 1.19	6
7	12	(New Zealand) Denny Hulme	McLaren-Ford	1:37.20	+ 1.23	7
8	24	(Australia) Tim Schenken	Surtees-Ford	1:37.25	+ 1.28	8
9	18	(Belgium) Jacky Ickx	Ferrari	1:37.33	+ 1.36	9
10	9	(New Zealand) Howden Ganley	BRM	1:37.55	+ 1.58	10
11	5	(Sweden) Ronnie Peterson	March-Ford	1:37.58	+ 1.61	11
12	25	(United Kingdom) Mike Hailwood	Surtees-Ford	1:37.77	+ 1.80	12
13	11	(Italy) Andrea de Adamich	Surtees-Ford	1:38.08	+ 2.11	13
14	16	(United Kingdom) Graham Hill	Brabham-Ford	1:38.14	+ 2.17	14
15	28	(Brazil) Wilson Fittipaldi	Brabham-Ford	1:38.25	+ 2.28	15
16	6	(United Kingdom) Peter Gethin	BRM	1:38.48	+ 2.51	16
17	27	(West Germany) Rolf Stommelen	Eifelland-Ford	1:38.62	+ 2.65	17
18	23	(Brazil) Carlos Pace	March-Ford	1:38.62	+ 2.65	18
19	21	(Australia) David Walker	Lotus-Ford	1:38.81	+ 2.84	19
20	2	(France) François Cevert	Tyrrell-Ford	1:38.85	+ 2.88	20
21	7	(France) Jean-Pierre Beltoise	BRM	1:38.89	+ 2.92	21
22	4	(Austria) Niki Lauda	March-Ford	1:39.04	+ 3.07	22
23	15	(Italy) Nanni Galli	Tecno	1:39.13	+ 3.16	23
24	3	(United Kingdom) Mike Beuttler	March-Ford	1:39.92	+ 3.95	24
25	22	(France) Henri Pescarolo	March-Ford	1:40.28	+ 4.31	DNS
26	29	(France) François Migault	Connew-Ford	1:43.88	+ 7.91	25

== Race ==
=== Classification ===
Pos	No	Driver	Constructor	Laps	Time/Retired	Grid	Points
1	31	(Brazil) Emerson Fittipaldi	Lotus-Ford	54	1:29:16.66	1	9
2	12	(New Zealand) Denny Hulme	McLaren-Ford	54	+ 1.18	7	6
3	14	(United States) Peter Revson	McLaren-Ford	54	+ 36.53	4	4
4	25	(United Kingdom) Mike Hailwood	Surtees-Ford	54	+ 44.76	12	3
5	10	(New Zealand) Chris Amon	Matra	54	+ 45.64	6	2
6	9	(New Zealand) Howden Ganley	BRM	54	+ 1:01.19	10	1
7	1	(United Kingdom) Jackie Stewart	Tyrrell-Ford	54	+ 1:09.09	3	
8	7	(France) Jean-Pierre Beltoise	BRM	54	+ 1:21.45	21	
9	2	(France) François Cevert	Tyrrell-Ford	53	+ 1 lap	20	
10	4	(Austria) Niki Lauda	March-Ford	53	+ 1 lap	22	
11	24	(Australia) Tim Schenken	Surtees-Ford	52	+ 2 laps	8	
12	5	(Sweden) Ronnie Peterson	March-Ford	52	+ 2 laps	11	
13	6	(United Kingdom) Peter Gethin	BRM	51	+ 3 laps	16	
14	11	(Italy) Andrea de Adamich	Surtees-Ford	51	+ 3 laps	13	
15	27	(Germany) Rolf Stommelen	Eifelland-Ford	48	Engine	17	
NC	23	(Brazil) Carlos Pace	March-Ford	46	+ 8 laps	18	
NC	15	(Italy) Nanni Galli	Tecno	45	Oil leak	23	
Ret	16	(United Kingdom) Graham Hill	Brabham-Ford	36	Injection	14	
Ret	28	(Brazil) Wilson Fittipaldi	Brabham-Ford	31	Brakes	15	
Ret	3	(United Kingdom) Mike Beuttler	March-Ford	24	Fuel system	24	
Ret	29	(France) François Migault	Connew-Ford	22	Suspension	25	
Ret	18	(Belgium) Jacky Ickx	Ferrari	20	Fuel system	9	
Ret	17	(Argentina) Carlos Reutemann	Brabham-Ford	14	Injection	5	
Ret	19	(Switzerland) Clay Regazzoni	Ferrari	13	Fuel system	2	
Ret	21	(Australia) Dave Walker	Lotus-Ford	6	Engine	19	
DNS	22	(France) Henri Pescarolo	March-Ford		Accident		

== Notes ==
- This was the 5th Grand Prix win for a Brazilian driver.

== Championship standings after the race ==
Drivers' Championship standings

	Pos	Driver	Points
	1	(Brazil) **Emerson Fittipaldi***	52
	2	(United Kingdom) **Jackie Stewart***	27
1	3	(New Zealand) **Denny Hulme***	27
1	4	(Belgium) **Jacky Ickx***	25
1	5	(United States) Peter Revson	14

Constructors' Championship standings

	Pos	Constructor	Points
	1	(United Kingdom) **Lotus-Ford***	52
2	2	(United Kingdom) **McLaren-Ford***	35
1	3	(United Kingdom) **Tyrrell-Ford***	33
1	4	(Italy) **Ferrari***	29
	5	(United Kingdom) BRM	13

- Note: Only the top five positions are included for both sets of standings.
- Competitors in bold and marked with an asterisk still had a theoretical chance of becoming World Champion.

Previous race: 1972 German Grand Prix	FIA Formula One World Championship; 1972 season	Next race: 1972 Italian Grand Prix
Previous race: 1971 Austrian Grand Prix	Austrian Grand Prix	Next race: 1973 Austrian Grand Prix
