= 1972 Argentine Grand Prix =

- Layout of the Buenos Aires circuit in 1972

Race details
- Date: January 23, 1972
- Official name: IX Gran Premio de la Republica Argentina
- Location: Autodromo Municipal Ciudad de Buenos Aires
- Course: Permanent racing facility
- Course length: 3.346 km (2.079 miles)
- Distance: 95 laps, 317.87 km (197.505 miles)

Pole position
Driver	(Argentina) Carlos Reutemann	Brabham-Ford
- Time: 1:12.46

Fastest lap
Driver	(United Kingdom) Jackie Stewart	Tyrrell-Ford
- Time: 1:13.66 on lap 25

Podium
First	(United Kingdom) Jackie Stewart	Tyrrell-Ford
Second	(New Zealand) Denny Hulme	McLaren-Ford
Third	(Belgium) Jacky Ickx	Ferrari

The 1972 Argentine Grand Prix was a Formula One motor race held at the Buenos Aires circuit on 23 January 1972. It was race 1 of 12 in both the 1972 World Championship of Drivers and the 1972 International Cup for Formula One Manufacturers. The 95-lap race was won by Tyrrell driver Jackie Stewart after he started from second position. Denny Hulme finished second for the McLaren team and Ferrari driver Jacky Ickx came in third.

The race was notable for the debut of local driver and future Grand Prix winner Carlos Reutemann, who scored pole position in his Brabham BT34.

== Classification ==
=== Qualifying ===
Pos.	No.	Driver	Constructor	Time	Gap
1	2	(Argentina) Carlos Reutemann	Brabham–Ford	1:12.46	
2	21	(United Kingdom) Jackie Stewart	Tyrrell–Ford	1:12.68	+0.22
3	18	(United States) Peter Revson	McLaren–Ford	1:12.74	+0.28
4	17	(New Zealand) Denny Hulme	McLaren–Ford	1:12.99	+0.53
5	11	(Brazil) Emerson Fittipaldi	Lotus–Ford	1:13.28	+0.82
6	9	(Switzerland) Clay Regazzoni	Ferrari	1:13.28	+0.82
7	22	(France) François Cevert	Tyrrell–Ford	1:13.39	+0.93
8	8	(Belgium) Jacky Ickx	Ferrari	1:13.50	+1.04
9	10	(United States) Mario Andretti	Ferrari	1:13.61	+1.15
10	14	(Sweden) Ronnie Peterson	March–Ford	1:14.06	+1.60
11	19	(Australia) Tim Schenken	Surtees–Ford	1:14.17	+1.71
12	16	(New Zealand) Chris Amon	Matra	1:14.28	+1.82
13	3	(New Zealand) Howden Ganley	BRM	1:14.28	+1.82
14	20	(Italy) Andrea de Adamich	Surtees–Ford	1:14.34	+1.88
15	23	(France) Henri Pescarolo	March–Ford	1:14.49	+2.03
16	1	(United Kingdom) Graham Hill	Brabham–Ford	1:14.52	+2.06
17	4	(Sweden) Reine Wisell	BRM	1:14.52	+2.06
18	5	(United Kingdom) Peter Gethin	BRM	1:15.11	+2.65
19	7	(Austria) Helmut Marko	BRM	1:15.53	+3.07
20	12	(Australia) David Walker	Lotus–Ford	1:15.55	+3.09
21	6	(Spain) Alex Soler-Roig	BRM	1:15.66	+3.20
22	15	(Austria) Niki Lauda	March–Ford	1:15.92	+3.46

=== Race ===
Pos	No	Driver	Constructor	Laps	Time/Retired	Grid	Points
1	21	(United Kingdom) Jackie Stewart	Tyrrell-Ford	95	1:57:58.82	2	9
2	17	(New Zealand) Denny Hulme	McLaren-Ford	95	+ 25.96	4	6
3	8	(Belgium) Jacky Ickx	Ferrari	95	+ 59.39	8	4
4	9	(Switzerland) Clay Regazzoni	Ferrari	95	+ 1:06.72	6	3
5	19	(Australia) Tim Schenken	Surtees-Ford	95	+ 1:09.11	11	2
6	14	(Sweden) Ronnie Peterson	March-Ford	94	+ 1 lap	10	1
7	2	(Argentina) Carlos Reutemann	Brabham-Ford	93	+ 2 laps	1	
8	23	(France) Henri Pescarolo	March-Ford	93	+ 2 laps	15	
9	3	(New Zealand) Howden Ganley	BRM	93	+ 2 laps	13	
10	7	(Austria) Helmut Marko	BRM	93	+ 2 laps	19	
11	15	(Austria) Niki Lauda	March-Ford	93	+ 2 laps	22	
Ret	11	(Brazil) Emerson Fittipaldi	Lotus-Ford	61	Suspension	5	
Ret	22	(France) François Cevert	Tyrrell-Ford	59	Gearbox	7	
Ret	4	(Sweden) Reine Wisell	BRM	59	Water leak	17	
Ret	18	(United States) Peter Revson	McLaren-Ford	49	Engine	3	
Ret	10	(United States) Mario Andretti	Ferrari	20	Engine	9	
Ret	20	(Italy) Andrea de Adamich	Surtees-Ford	11	Fuel system	14	
Ret	1	(United Kingdom) Graham Hill	Brabham-Ford	11	Fuel pump	16	
DSQ	12	(Australia) David Walker	Lotus-Ford	8	Received outside assistance	20	
Ret	5	(United Kingdom) Peter Gethin	BRM	1	Oil leak	18	
Ret	6	(Spain) Alex Soler-Roig	BRM	1	Accident	21	
DNS	16	(New Zealand) Chris Amon	Matra	0	Gearbox on warm-up lap	12	

== Notes ==
- This was the Formula One World Championship debut for Argentinian driver and future Grand Prix winner Carlos Reutemann. Being his first race, it was also his first pole position.
- This was the 25th Grand Prix start for British constructor March.
- This was the 5th fastest lap by a Tyrrell.

== Championship standings after the race ==
Drivers' Championship standings

Pos	Driver	Points
1	(United Kingdom) Jackie Stewart	9
2	(New Zealand) Denny Hulme	6
3	(Belgium) Jacky Ickx	4
4	(Switzerland) Clay Regazzoni	3
5	(Australia) Tim Schenken	2

Constructors' Championship standings

Pos	Constructor	Points
1	(United Kingdom) Tyrrell-Ford	9
2	(United Kingdom) McLaren-Ford	6
3	(Italy) Ferrari	4
4	(United Kingdom) Surtees-Ford	2
5	(United Kingdom) March-Ford	1

- Note: Only the top five positions are included for both sets of standings.

Previous race: 1971 United States Grand Prix	FIA Formula One World Championship; 1972 season	Next race: 1972 South African Grand Prix
Previous race: 1971 Argentine Grand Prix	Argentine Grand Prix	Next race: 1973 Argentine Grand Prix
