= March 701 =

Formula One racing car

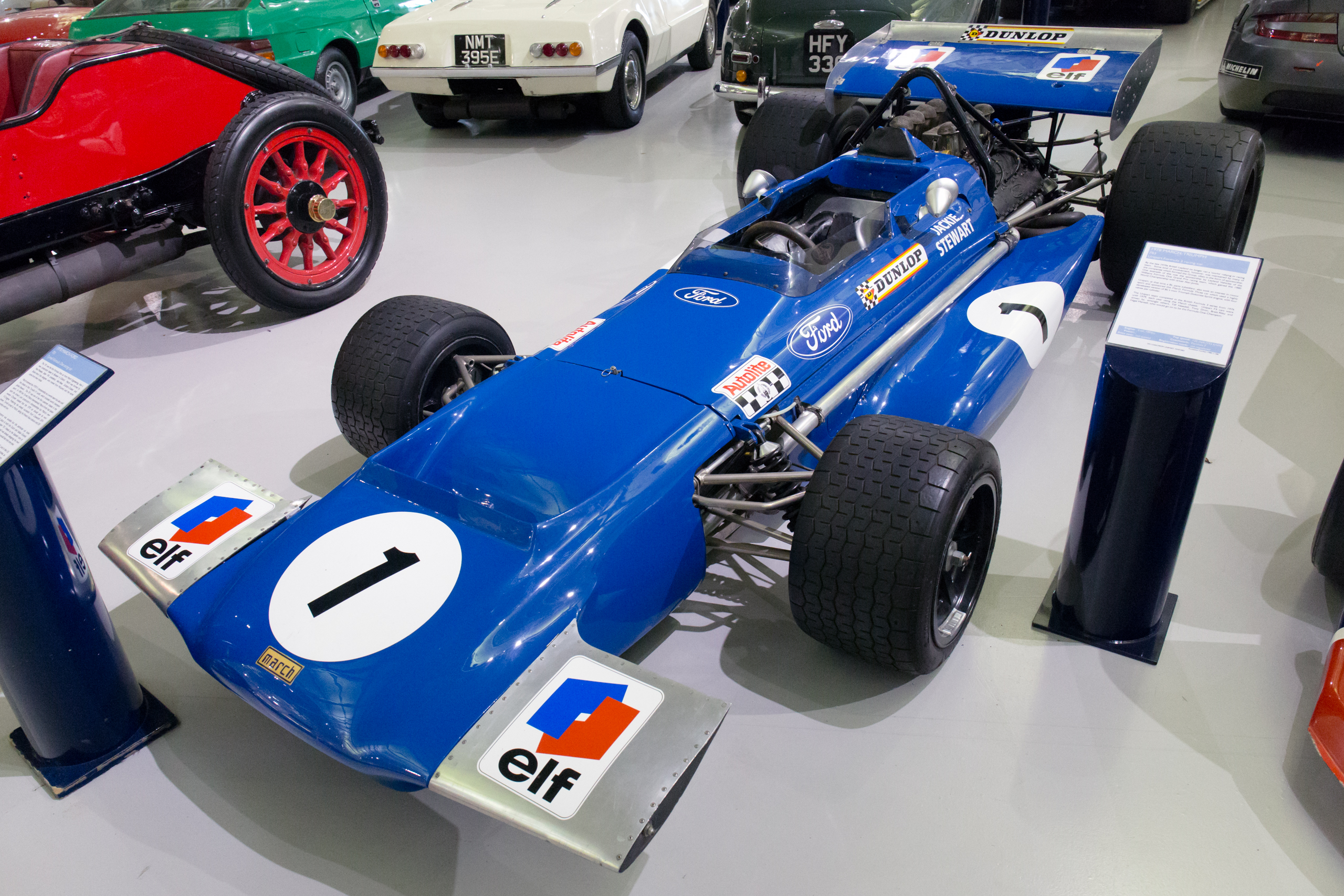
- Category: Formula One/Tasman Series
- Constructor: March Engineering
- Designers: Robin Herd; Peter Wright
- Successor: March 711

Technical specifications
- Chassis: Aluminium monocoque, with engine as a fully stressed member.
- Suspension (front): Double wishbone, with outboard coilover spring/damper units
- Suspension (rear): Double link and radius arms, with outboard coilover spring/damper units
- Length: 156 in (396 cm)
- Height: 36 in (91 cm)
- Axle track: 60 in (152 cm)
- Wheelbase: 93 in (236 cm)
- Engine: Ford Cosworth DFV 2,993 cc (182.6 cu in) 90° V8, naturally aspirated, mid-mounted.
- Transmission: Hewland DG300 5-speed manual gearbox, with Borg & Beck clutch.
- Weight: 565 kg (1,246 lb)
- Lubricants: Elf Aquitaine/STP
- Tyres: Dunlop/Firestone

Competition history
- Notable entrants: March Engineering; Tyrrell Racing Organisation; Antique Automobiles
- Notable drivers: (United Kingdom) Jackie Stewart (France) François Cevert (New Zealand) Chris Amon (Switzerland) Jo Siffert (United States) Mario Andretti (Sweden) Ronnie Peterson
- Debut: 1970 South African Grand Prix
Races	Wins	Poles	F/Laps
16	1	3	1
- Unless otherwise stated, all data refer to Formula One World Championship Grands Prix only.

The March 701 is a Formula One racing car model, designed by Robin Herd with Peter Wright, and built by March Engineering. The 701 was March's first Formula One design – following their one-off March 693P Formula Three prototype of 1969 – and was designed and built in only three months. The March 701 made its race debut a month after its public unveiling, at the 1970 South African Grand Prix. In total, eleven 701s were constructed, with March supplying many privateer entrants as well as their own works team. The 701's career started well, March drivers taking three wins and three pole positions from the car's first four race entries, but lack of development through the 1970 Formula One season resulted in increasingly poor results as the year wore on. The 701 was superseded by the March 711 in 1971, and made its last World Championship race appearance at the 1971 Italian Grand Prix.

== Design ==
March Engineering was set up in September 1969 by amateur racing drivers Max Mosley, Alan Rees and Graham Coaker, with engineer and former McLaren and Cosworth racing car designer Robin Herd. After producing their first prototype, the 693P, in Coaker's garage Max Mosley announced that March would enter a car for the first Grand Prix of the 1970 Formula One season. Designer Robin Herd started work on the car in November 1969, and by the 701's official press launch on 6 February 1970 two cars had been finished and were ready to run. In order to complete the car in the short time available Herd had been forced to take a "British Standard" conservative approach and held over more advanced features for the 701's 1971 successor, the March 711. L. J. K. Setright, writing in Car Magazine, described the 701 as "a Chinese copy of a McLaren Lotus" and suggested that "to make a better 1967 car in 1970 is just being wise after the event." Interviewed in 2010, Herd stated that at the time he was "disillusioned by the 701, because it was nothing like the car I wanted to build." The stress and workload involved with getting the car finished to Mosley's ambitious deadline meant that Herd lost over a stone and half in weight.

Following the conventions laid down with March's first design, the car's name encoded both its year of design (70x for 1970) and the intended class of competition (xx1 for Formula One). Mosley calculated that each car cost £2500–3000 to build, and had initially planned to sell them to customers for £6000 apiece. However, Walter Hayes of Ford of Europe, who were funding Ken Tyrrell's purchase of two cars for his privateer team, persuaded him that he should in fact be charged £9000. In total, eleven March 701 chassis were constructed – three works cars and eight for sale to customers – and as of 2012 at least ten of these were known to survive.

=== Chassis and bodywork ===
The 701 was built around a "boxy and workmanlike" bathtub monocoque chassis – constructed from L72 alclad aluminium sheet with cast magnesium bulkheads – that carried the engine as a stressed member. Most of the 701 chassis produced were manufactured in 18 swg sheet, although a special lightweight car, chassis 701/6, was built for the works team during the 1970 season using lighter 20 swg aluminium, although they never raced that car. One of the Tyrrell cars, 701/4, was also rebuilt with a 20 swg monocoque early in the course of the season.

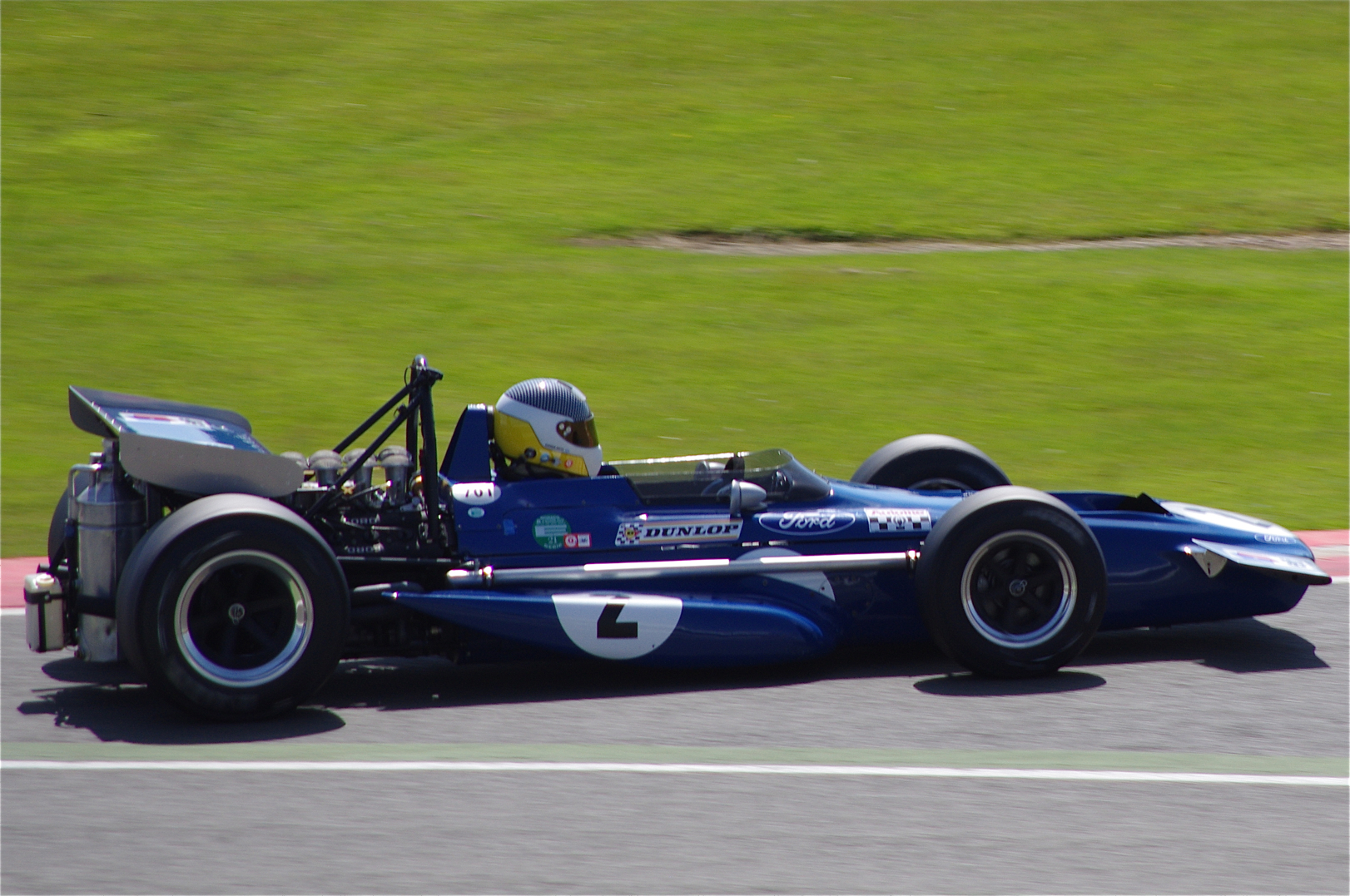
Tyrrell Racing's March 701/2, showing the aerofoil shape of the side tanks

Ahead of the car's forward bulkhead the brake cylinders, fire extinguisher system, battery and radiator were carried on a tray-like extension to the cockpit floor pan, constructed in lighter 20 gauge aluminium sheet. Herd did consider using side-mounted radiators, but these were too complex to design and build in the time available. The car's fibreglass nose bodywork enclosing the radiator was relatively square, with a near-rectangular opening for the radiator intake. On either side of the radiator opening Herd placed small wings to generate downforce, moulded with the radiator cowl as a single unit. These wings were fixed in position, braced with a steel tube that spanned their full width, and carried adjustable trim tabs along their trailing edges. At the rear of the car a large, single-plane, adjustable wing was mounted atop the gearbox, between the rear wheels.

One of the 701's visually distinctive features was the aerofoil shape given to the detachable side-mounted external fuel tanks, positioned between the wheels. Before the start of the 1970 season Herd had reckoned on the car requiring a fuel capacity of "well over" 40 gallons for each race. Each of these side-mounted tanks contained six gallons of fuel that, combined with the main tank behind the driver's seat and two tanks on either side of the driver within the monocoque, gave the 701 a total fuel capacity of 60 gallons. The tanks' profile was created by Peter Wright, who at that time worked for March's bodywork contractor Specialised Mouldings. Although the aerofoil shape was claimed at the time to produce "downthrust" and aid stability, Herd has since stated that in the turbulent air between the wheels they would only have been marginally effective.

=== Engine and transmission ===
Again following conventional practice, to propel the car Herd employed the tried and tested combination of a Ford-Cosworth DFV engine mated to a Hewland DG300 five-speed gearbox. The DFV was a 2,993 cc (183 cu in) 90° V8 engine, and in its original form developed around 430 bhp (320 kW). Following the pattern established in Formula One by Keith Duckworth for Colin Chapman's Lotus 49 of 1967, the engine was mounted behind the driver and formed a stressed component of the car's structure. The rear suspension and engine ancillaries were all directly mounted to the engine and gearbox themselves, rather than a chassis subframe. The only exceptions were the suspension radius arms, which transmitted fore and aft loads directly into the monocoque.

=== Suspension and ancillary components ===
The 701's rear suspension was a relatively conservative twin link and radius arm system, with coilover spring and damper units mounted outboard of the car's bodywork, in the airflow. Double wishbone suspension was employed for the front wheels, which Herd described as "slightly unconventional for a current formula 1 car", again with the spring and damper units mounted outboard. Herd attributed his choice of the double wishbone system to a desire to overcome the suspension geometry compromises necessary to accommodate the increasingly wide front tyres of contemporary Formula One, while outboard shock absorbers – despite aerodynamic disadvantages – provided advantages in simplicity, cooling and stress management.

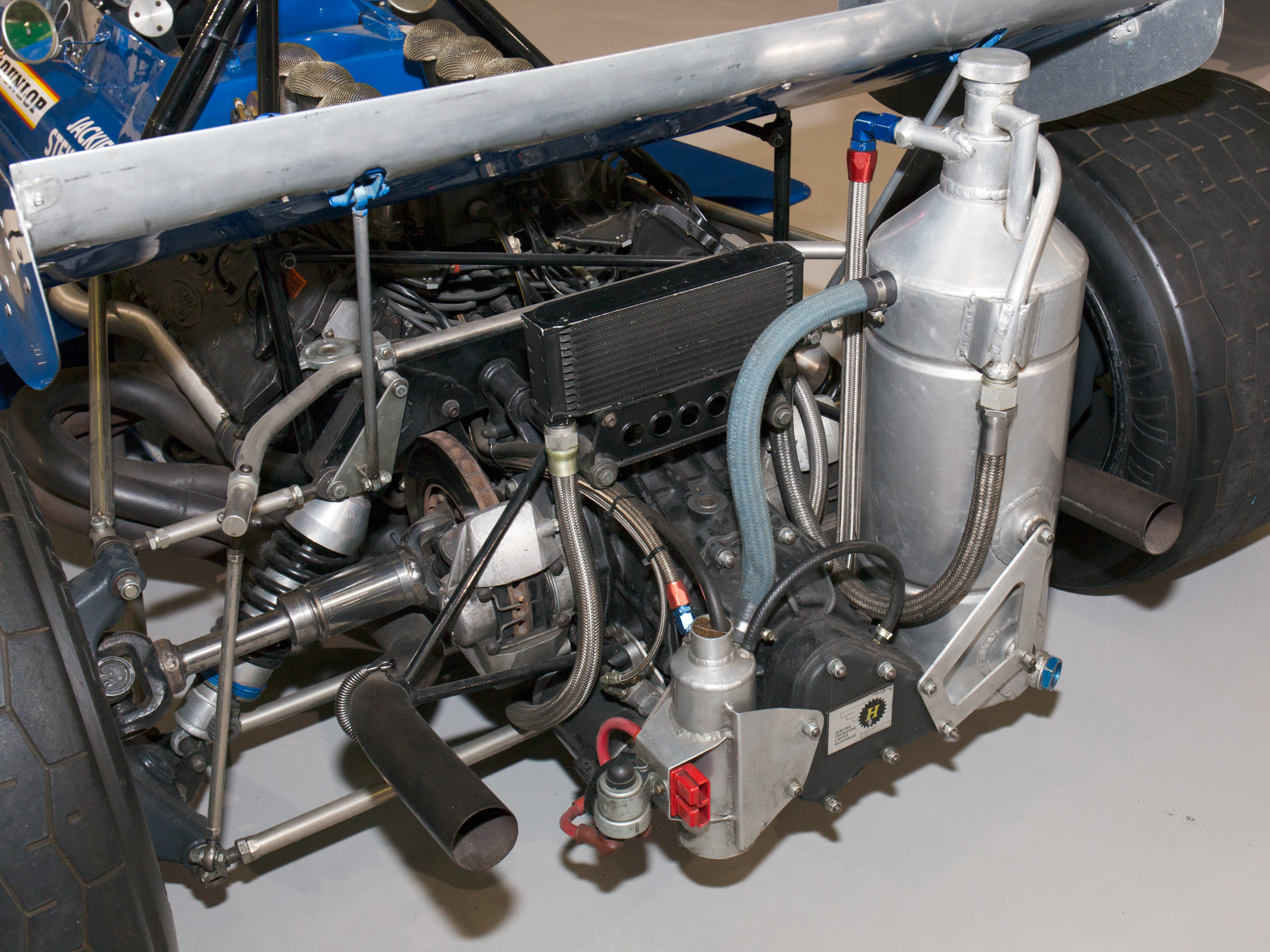
The large oil tank and small oil radiator mounted to the car's Hewland DG300 gearbox, at the rear of one of the Tyrrell team cars

Braking duties were performed by 10.5 in (26.7 cm) Girling disc brakes at each wheel. These were initially positioned within the car's wheel rims, but for the second race of the 1970 season, in Spain, March switched the works 701s' rear brakes to an inboard design, that Herd estimated reduced the car's unsprung mass by approximately 25%. All other 701s were converted to the same specification over the subsequent few weeks.

The wheels themselves were to March's own design and employed the single centre stud fixing method that Herd had pioneered on the abortive Cosworth four-wheel drive car of the previous year. Some reports state that Herd had intended them to be 13 in (33 cm) in diameter all round, but that March were forced to specify 15 in (38 cm) rims at the rear in early races due to a lack of suitably developed 13 in rear tyres at the start of the 1970 season. However, Herd has also stated that he was forced to make the switch to 13 in because Firestone reduced the size of their tyres. Once the cars' brakes had been modified to the inboard design 13 in rims could also be employed at the rear.

Another visual hallmark of the 701 was its combined oil tank and de-aerator. This large, cylindrical tank was mounted vertically to the right hand side of the Hewland transaxle, filling the space between the right rear wheel, the gearbox and the wing. Autocar sporting editor Innes Ireland described it as "enormous" and looking "like an old fashioned coffee percolator". The oil radiator itself was mounted atop the gearbox, to avoid the surge and starvation problems associated with the lengthy pipes needed to mount the radiator in the nose, alongside the water radiator.

=== The Tyrrell cars ===
Although the chassis monocoques for 701/2 and 701/4 had been manufactured by March, the final buildup of the cars was by Tyrrell mechanics. As a result, the blue Tyrrell cars incorporated a significant number of differences and tweaks in their configuration to the cars run by the works March team and those supplied to other customers. The first major difference was the specification of Dunlop tyres, rather than the Firestone rubber with which the works cars were equipped and the 701 had been designed around. In an attempt to develop the car and improve its handling the Tyrrell team made adjustments to the position of the suspension mounting points and added a damper to the steering system. More subtle variations related to the positioning of exhaust pipe brackets, wing struts, the oil radiator, and the pipe runs for lubrication and coolant fluids.

Following the first race in South Africa the Tyrrell team also made adjustments to the design of the front wings. They removed the fixed, fibreglass items integrated into the nose cone that had been supplied by March and replaced them with adjustable aluminium aerofoils. These could pivot about a horizontal axis to alter the whole plane's angle of attack. An additional benefit was that they were removable, to reduce drag, and Stewart's car made use of this for the Italian Grand Prix at the high-speed Monza circuit.

During the 1970 season Ken Tyrrell became increasingly critical of the 701's shortcomings, in particular targeting the fact that the car was 70 kilograms (150 lb) over the mandated minimum weight limit. However, Herd had deliberately prioritized reliability and safety in the car's design, in large part due to influence applied by Tyrrell and Stewart.

== Performance characteristics ==
Jackie Stewart has described the car as "the most difficult F1 car I drove." Herd's design compromises meant that he had balanced the weight of the heavy front-mounted radiator by placing the oil tank and filter as far rearward as possible. Having two significant masses at the outermost positions relative to the 701's centre of gravity imparted a high polar moment of inertia on the car. This made the 701 "unpleasant to drive" and severely affected its performance in slow corners. Owing to the high polar moment, the car was reluctant to start turning into a corner – resulting in significant initial understeer – but once the car was rotating through the corner it was then slow to straighten – resulting in significant oversteer at the corner exit. Stewart ascribed the speed that he and Chris Amon were able to extract from their 701s early in the season to their driving styles, both being notably smooth in comparison with their competition.

== Race history ==
=== 1970 season ===
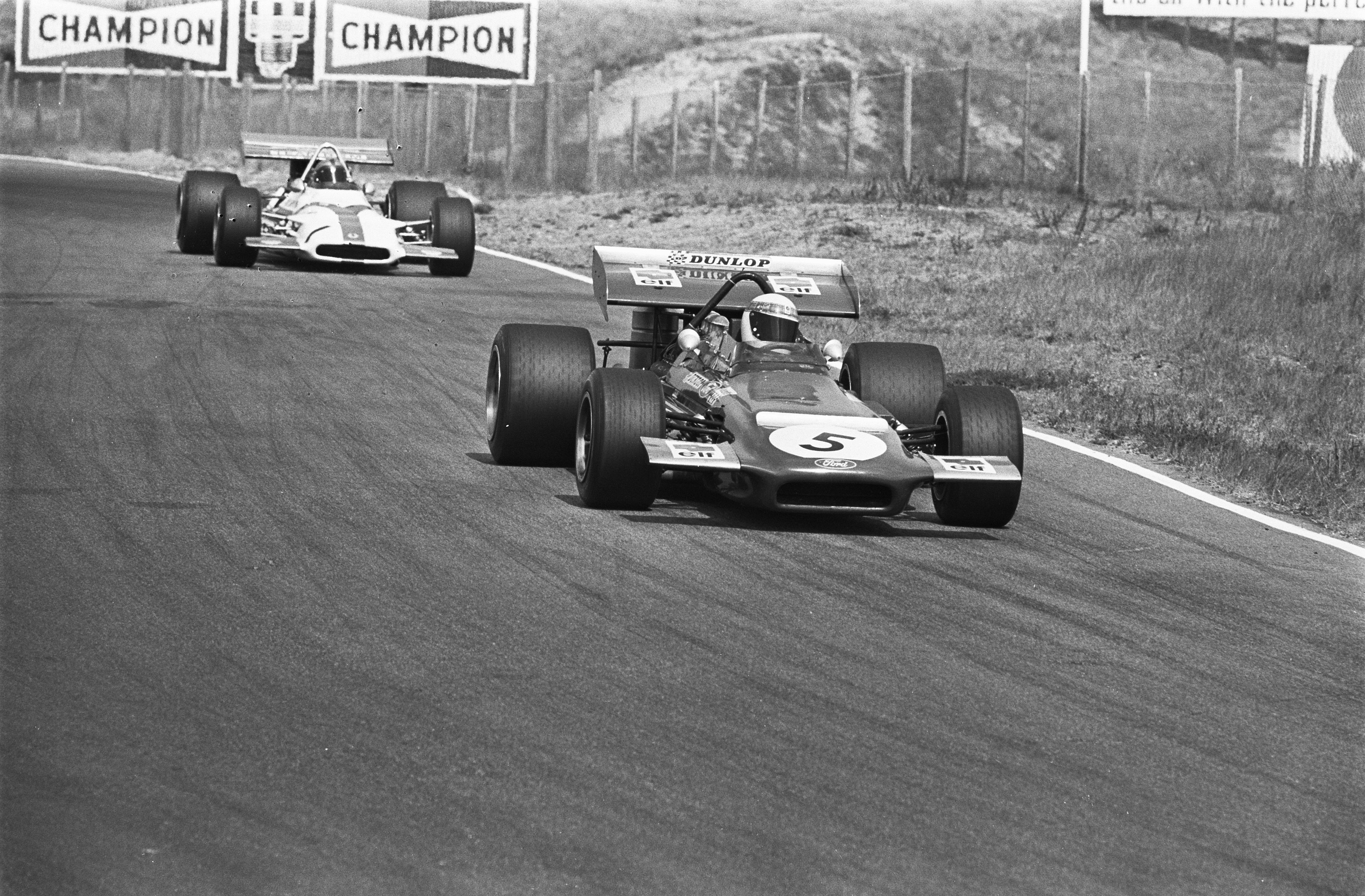
Jackie Stewart's Tyrrell Racing March 701 leads Pedro Rodríguez's BRM at the 1970 Dutch Grand Prix

March introduced the 701 to press and public at a large event hosted at Silverstone circuit on Friday 6 February 1970. Chris Amon demonstrated his works chassis, 701/1, while Jackie Stewart drove the first of the Tyrrell customer cars, chassis 701/2. Speculation regarding March's source of funding had been rife since the announcement of the March Formula One car, and also in attendance was newly unveiled team sponsor Andy Granatelli, of the STP Corporation. In addition to the two lead drivers, Granatelli's nominated driver, Mario Andretti, also appeared, although he did not try the new car. Amon's new works team mate, Jo Siffert, did though, as did March Formula Two driver Ronnie Peterson.

==== Race debut ====
Although designed and built in only 12 weeks, no fewer than five March 701 cars were present at the first race of the 1970 World Championship season: the 1970 South African Grand Prix in early March. The two March Engineering-entered works cars were chassis 701/1 (in red) and 701/5 (in a brighter, 'dayglow' STP red) for Chris Amon and Jo Siffert, respectively. Amon had joined March as the works' lead driver from Scuderia Ferrari, while Siffert's drive had been bought for him by Porsche for £30,000, in order to keep him from signing as Amon's replacement with the Italian team. A third 701 present also wore the darker of the two red STP liveries. This car, chassis 701/3 but presented as the "STP Oil Treatment Special", was owned and entered by Andy Granatelli to be driven by Mario Andretti. Both Tyrrell cars – chassis 701/2 and 701/4, in Tyrrell's Elf-sponsored blue livery – were also present, driven by reigning World Champion Jackie Stewart and Tyrrell's number two driver, Johnny Servoz-Gavin.

Stewart and Amon qualified their cars in first and second place on the grid, respectively. Andretti had damaged the rear of his car during a private test session the day before the first official session and the process of repairing it and sourcing a spare engine meant that he missed the first two timed practices. He started from 11th. Just ahead of him on the grid was Siffert in ninth position, while Servoz-Gavin was two rows behind the American, starting from 17th position. In the early portion of the race Stewart's car led for many laps, but this was largely owing to his opposition being impeded and put out of position due to a first corner spin by Jochen Rindt. Once Jack Brabham's Brabham and Denny Hulme in a McLaren had cleared the confusion they began to whittle down Stewart's lead. Brabham passed Stewart on the 20th lap of the race, as did Hulme on lap 38, and the reigning World Champion eventually finished in third place. Amon and Andretti both suffered from severe overheating following failures of their cars' cooling system header tanks, and they retired after two and 11 laps, respectively. Siffert was running in the top ten in the early portion of the race, but while dicing with Jacky Ickx and Jean-Pierre Beltoise for fifth position he spun and crushed his car's right exhaust pipe. The time he lost in the pits having the damage repaired pushed him well down the field and he eventually finished five laps down on the leaders, in tenth place. Servoz-Gavin's engine failed on lap 57, also following the loss of his coolant fluid, and he retired.

==== Early season successes ====
Following the 701's promising if troubled debut, March Engineering and Tyrrell entered their lead drivers for the non-championship 1970 Race of Champions at Brands Hatch, two weeks later. Again Stewart took pole position in 701/2, with Amon seventh in 701/1, but on this occasion the Scot was able to convert pole position to victory; the first for a March car, in only the constructor's second Formula One race. Amon suffered a camshaft failure and retired on lap 10 of the 50 lap race.

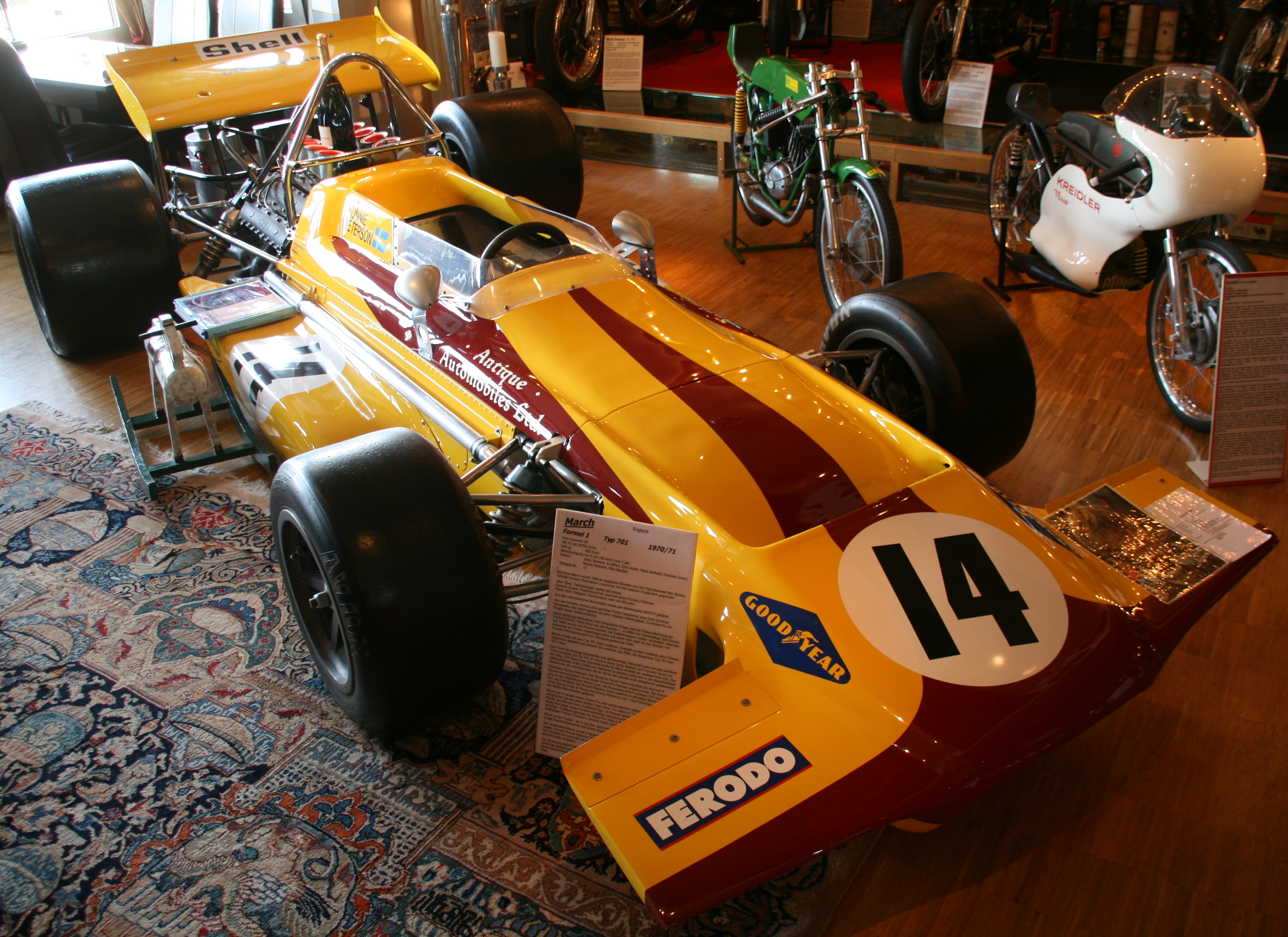
Chassis 701/8 in its Antique Automobiles Racing livery, as driven by Ronnie Peterson at the 1970 Monaco Grand Prix

A month later four of the five cars entered in South Africa also appeared for the second World Championship round, the 1970 Spanish Grand Prix at Jarama, although Siffert failed to qualify for the race. On this occasion Stewart was beaten to pole position by Jack Brabham, but starting on the front row from third place he was able to take victory once again, March's first World Championship victory, and lapped the entire field. Andretti joined him on the podium, having driven Granatelli's car to third place after starting back down the field in 16th position. A third March 701 also finished in the top five when Servoz-Gavin drove Tyrrell's new second car, chassis 701/7, to fifth place having started in 14th. Amon again retired with engine troubles.

Amon's luck changed when the Formula One circus returned to England for the next non-championship race only a week later, for which the works and Tyrrell again only entered their number one pilots. On this occasion it was Amon who took pole position for the first heat of the 1970 BRDC International Trophy event at Silverstone, and he kept the lead to the finish 26 laps later, having also posted the fastest lap of the race. Stewart qualified and finished in second position. In the second heat roles were reversed and it was Stewart who won and set fastest lap, with Amon following him across the finish line in second place. However, the overall event result was calculated on an aggregate time from the two heats and Amon took the International Trophy from Stewart by ten seconds.

At the 1970 Monaco Grand Prix, in May, the works and Tyrrell cars were joined by a new yellow and maroon March 701, chassis 701/8, that March had sold to Colin Crabbe's Antique Automobiles privateer team, on condition that Crabbe ran Swede Ronnie Peterson in the car. Stewart qualified 701/2 in first place and Amon chassis 701/1 in second, with Siffert and Peterson 11th and 12th, respectively. Servoz-Gavin failed to qualify for the 16 car race and, fearing that his eyesight was failing, he retired from Formula One. In the race Amon held on to his position until his rear suspension failed on lap 60 of 80, while Stewart had retired three laps earlier than Amon with a broken engine. Both Peterson and Siffert were classified at the race conclusion, although they only took the final two positions in seventh and eighth, and Siffert had already ground to a halt having run out of fuel on lap 76.

==== Gradual decline ====
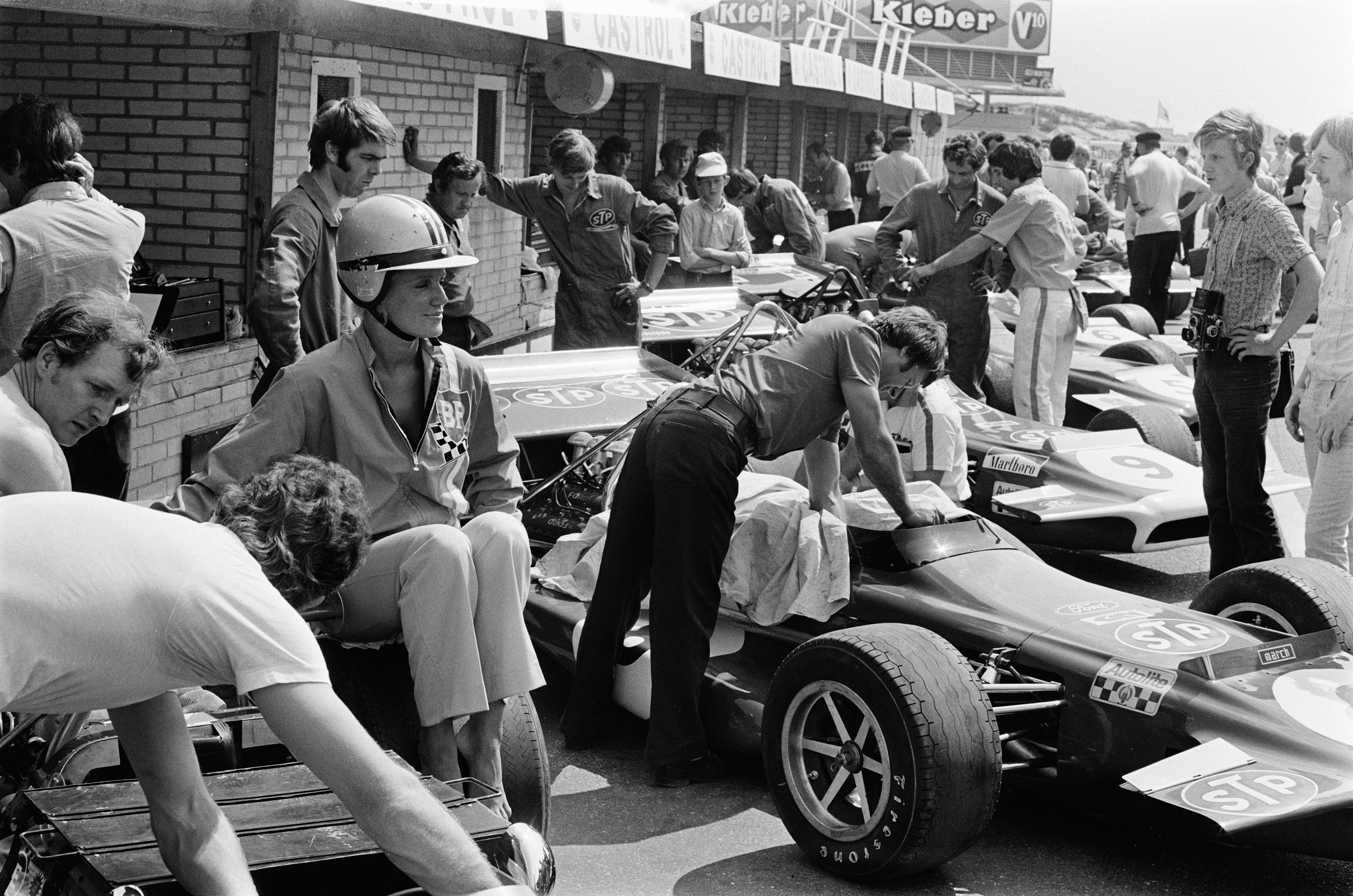
The four leading March 701 cars, pictured in the pits at the 1970 Dutch Grand Prix. Chris Amon's STP-sponsored works car (#8) is closest, with Jo Siffert's sister car (#9) beyond. In the rear are the two Tyrrell Racing entries: #5 (Jackie Stewart) and #6 (François Cevert)

With three wins, four pole positions, and a fastest lap from March's first five race entries as a Formula One constructor the new firm had rapidly developed a significant degree of respect amongst its competitors and the Formula One hierarchy. However, the results flattered to deceive as the car handled poorly and started the season at least 50 kg (110 lb) overweight. Apart from the money Porsche had paid for Siffert's position in the team, the only other funding that March received in 1970 was a total of £25,000 from STP and £27,000 from tyre sponsor Firestone. This limited funding – and technical resources stretched thin due to Formula Two, Formula Three and Can-Am commitments – meant that March was not able to develop the 701 significantly through the season. Following the introduction of advanced competitors, such as the Lotus 72, the March 701 started to fall behind its rivals. March had managed to gather enough resources to construct the lightweight 701/6 as a spare chassis for the works team, although they never raced it, and following the Monaco race they completely rebuilt Amon's regular mount 701/1 around a fresh monocoque, but using lighter side tanks, wheels and radiator, which all combined to shed around 30 kg (66 lb) from the car's mass.

Using this lightened 701/1 car Amon qualified third for the 1970 Belgian Grand Prix, where Stewart yet again took pole position in Tyrrell's 701/2. Amon's team mate Siffert qualified in tenth position and Peterson, again driving the Antique Automobiles car, went one place better and qualified in ninth. In the race Stewart retired on lap 14 after his engine failed, and Peterson eventually crossed the line eight laps down on the winners and not classified. For the second race in a row Siffert was forced to stop as a consequence of fuel issues, but again he had completed sufficient laps to be a classified finisher, this time in seventh place. Amon, though, spent the majority of the race in second place and chasing hard behind Pedro Rodríguez's BRM. He was eventually beaten to the victory by the Mexican by only 1.1 seconds. Some controversy surrounded this win, however, and both Amon and Robin Herd have since alleged that Rodríguez's car was equipped with an illegally large engine for that race. This was later refuted by BRM historian Doug Nye, who could find no evidence either that a switch had been made, nor that at that point BRM had sufficient resources to be able to construct such an engine.

From Belgium the World Championship season moved on to the neighbouring Netherlands two weeks later, for the 1970 Dutch Grand Prix at Zandvoort. Again Stewart qualified on the front row of the grid, taking second place to Jochen Rindt's Lotus 72 in Servoz-Gavin's South Africa chassis, 701/4. His new team mate, Frenchman François Cevert, qualified chassis 701/7 in 15th place on his Formula One debut. Amon took fourth and Siffert 17th places for the start in the works cars, while Peterson's yellow 701/8 went one better than Siffert, and he qualified in 16th place. In contrast to the Belgian race, this time it was Stewart's turn to chase hard and finish second, crossing the line 30 seconds behind race winner Rindt. Peterson was two laps down in ninth position, while Siffert and Cevert both failed to finish due to engine failures. Amon's clutch failed on the very first lap.

Amon's season took a turn to the better at the 1970 French Grand Prix. He qualified alongside Stewart on the second row of the grid – the works and Tyrrell drivers in third and fourth places, respectively – and by the chequered flag had risen to second place, beaten by Rindt's Lotus 72 by less than eight seconds. Stewart crossed the line over three minutes later in ninth place after. Cevert was a further lap behind, in 11th place, and Siffert and Peterson both failed to finish. After crossing the English Channel for the 1970 British Grand Prix a fortnight later, Amon and Stewart could not repeat their qualifying performances from the French race, and the team leaders lined up for the start in 17th and eighth places. One place behind Stewart, starting from ninth, was Mario Andretti, returning to Formula One competition during a break in his North American schedule, again driving Granatelli's bright red chassis 701/3. In the race Amon rose through the field to finish fifth, with Cevert a lap down in seventh, and Peterson eight laps in arrears in ninth. Siffert's suspension failed on lap 19, Andretti's did likewise two laps later, and Stewart's clutch collapsed on lap 52.

The next race, the 1970 German Grand Prix at Hockenheim, saw the entry into the fray of another new March 701 chassis. Touring car driver Hubert Hahne, with financial backing from Axel Springer, had bought chassis 701/9 and entered it for the race, painted in a German silver livery. Unfortunately for Hahne, he could not manage to get to within better than seven seconds of the pole position time and he failed to qualify for the race. Those who did qualify were Peterson in 18th, Cevert in 14th, Andretti in ninth, Stewart in seventh, Amon just ahead in sixth and, beating his team leader for the first time that year, Siffert in fourth. Yet again Siffert was classified despite being stationary when the flag fell, his ignition failure left him in eighth. One place ahead, and running one lap behind the winner was Cevert in seventh. His was the highest placed March, however, as the other three qualifiers had all dropped out with engine or transmission problems. As seventh was not a points-scoring position at the time, this was the first time that March had failed to score World Constructors' Championship points, eight races into their debut season. They again failed to score points at the next race, the 1970 Austrian Grand Prix, as the highest placed finisher was Amon, in eighth.

Life was made more complicated for March on their way home from the Austrian race, however. Following his failure to set a competitive time at Hockenheim, Hahne had immediately started legal proceedings against the firm, claiming that he had been sold a defective car. As the works team passed through Germany their cars and equipment were impounded by German police. Max Mosley managed to negotiate a release by offering to run an observed test of the car, back-to-back with the Antique Automobiles chassis. During the test at Silverstone Ronnie Peterson first set a respectable time in the yellow car, before he switched to Hahne's silver 701/9 and posted a time two seconds faster. Hahne subsequently dropped his action and retired from competition driving.

==== Tail end of the season ====
Between the Austrian race and the next World Championship round in Italy the Formula One teams returned once again to England for a non-championship race, this time the Oulton Park International Gold Cup. Unhappy with their Marches the Tyrrell team had been constructing their own chassis, the Tyrrell 001, in secret, and this was unveiled for Stewart at the Cheshire race. Cevert was not entered. With the absence of the works team owing to Hahne's legal action, for the first time in 1970 there was no March on the entry list for a European Formula One race.

Stewart and Cevert returned to their March 701s for the 1970 Italian Grand Prix, but it would prove to be the last time for the World Champion. Stewart nevertheless qualified in fourth, on the second row of the grid, and finished the race in second place. Cevert finished sixth, having started 11th, one place ahead of Amon in seventh. Peterson and Siffert both fell to engine failure.

At the first of the season ending trio of North American races, the 1970 Canadian Grand Prix at Mont-Tremblant, Cevert started in fourth place, his team leader having put the new Tyrrell 001 on pole position for its World Championship debut, with Amon two places further back, in sixth. Siffert, in the other works car, was a distant 14th and Peterson, further back still, was in 16th. At the end of the race Amon crossed the line in third place, the first of the Ford-powered finishers but half a lap down on the winning Ferrari pair. This was to be the March 701's last podium placed finish in the World Championship. Lesser points-scoring finishes for Amon followed in the 1970 United States Grand Prix and 1970 Mexican Grand Prix races, with his well-used chassis 701/1 finishing in fifth and then fourth place, but none of the remaining 701s scored points.

In the final tally, between the works and Tyrrell March 701 cars they had scored a total of 48 World Championship points. This took March to third place in the World Constructors' Championship in the constructor's debut season. In the Drivers' Championship Stewart finished fifth, with all of his 25 points having been scored with a March. Amon finished in eighth on 23 points. Andretti was 16th, with his four points all having been taken from his third-place finish in Spain. Despite having only driven in two races Servoz-Gavin finished ahead of Cevert, his two points for fifth in Spain just pipping Cevert's one point in Italy, with the pair finishing the year in 22nd and 23rd places in the Championship. As neither Siffert nor Peterson had scored Championship points, neither were classified. At the season's close the works cars were sold off; 701/1 went to Tom Wheatcroft, Siffert was allowed to purchase his chassis, 701/5, and the team's lightweight spare was sold to Frank Williams.

=== South African races ===
In June 1970 Rhodesian John Love bought a new March 701, chassis 701/10, to run for himself as part of his Team Gunston privateer outfit in the South African Formula One Championship. In its debut race, the Bulawayo 100 at Kumalo on 5 July, Love and 701/10 won, after series leader Dave Charlton's Lotus 49C retired on lap 23. Love took one additional second-placed finish, in the Rhodesian Grand Prix in September, but more often than not the car's poor handling and lack of reliability let him down and he failed to score any further points during the remainder of the 1970 South African season.

Love's 1971 South African season followed much the same pattern as the latter half of 1970. With the Team Gunston March 701 he took second place in the Highvelt 100 at Kyalami in March and victory in the Goldfields Autumn Trophy in May. However, reliability once again proved to be the March's Achilles heel, failures were numerous, and he attempted to replace the March with an ex-Mike Hailwood Surtees TS9 bought from Surtees directly. However, this car was delivered in extremely poor condition and, although faster than the March, was no more reliable. When the TS9 was almost destroyed in a large crash at the 25th Anniversary Trophy race in early August, Love was forced back to using 701/10. He took two further wins in the False Bay 100 in August and the Rhodesian Grand Prix in September, and finished second at the Welkom 100 in October, but finished third in the championship standings, on 45 points to Charlton's 72.

Charlton then equipped himself with a Lotus 72 for the 1972 South African season and Love realised that his two-year-old 701 was not going to prove a match for the more advanced car. After another failure from the March at the first race of the season, and almost writing off the rebuilt Surtees in the second, Love replaced them both with a Brabham BT33.

=== 1971 season ===
==== Tasman Series ====
In late 1970 the Granatelli STP car, chassis 701/3, was converted to Tasman Series specifications, principally by switching the Formula One specification 3.0 L (183 cu in) Cosworth DFV engine for its near identical 2.5 L (153 cu in) DFW derivative. This car was then shipped down to New Zealand for Chris Amon to drive in the 1971 Tasman Series. Although the 1971 series had been intended to be the first year run to Formula 5000 rules, rather than the older 2.5 litre formula, sufficient upset had been expressed by owners of previously eligible older cars that the organisers decided to admit both classes. In helping the STP team to prepare the car Amon had gambled that the Tasman cars – with their Formula One-derived, true racing engines – would prove faster than the Formula 5000 cars with their production-derived pushrod engines. He was wrong, and drivers of the newer cars found themselves able to comfortably beat the more exotic machinery.

The smaller DFW engine lacked torque in comparison to the full DFV motors, and Amon had to work hard for his third place at the season opening race at Levin, and fifth in the Wigram race. Between the two, Amon and the STP team had decided to replace their uncompetitive March 701 with a Lotus 70 Formula 5000 machine and Amon drove this in the New Zealand Grand Prix at Pukekohe. For the Grand Prix, with Amon driving the Lotus, local driver David Oxton took over 701/3. Unfortunately for him, one of the car's half shafts broke and he failed to finish. Oxton again drove 701/3 in the final New Zealand round of the series, at Teretonga, where he finished in seventh place. Following the series' move to its Australian rounds the car was returned to Formula One specifications, sold to Skip Barber, and shipped to the USA.

==== Formula One ====
Only three races of the 1971 World Championship season saw 701 entries; the works and STP March teams had moved on to the March 711, Ronnie Peterson was driving for the factory squad, and Tyrrell had constructed a second in-house car for Cevert. Frank Williams entered Henri Pescarolo for the 1971 South African Grand Prix, where he was joined by local John Love in his Team Gunston car. Pescarolo finished two laps down, out of the points, but the gearbox on Love's car failed on lap 30. Williams upgraded Pescarolo to a 711 shortly after, but kept the 701 for second-string pay drivers. It was one of these, Max Jean, that Williams entered for the 1971 French Grand Prix. On leaving March Siffert had taken his 1970 car, chassis 701/5, with him, and he entered François Mazet for the French race. Both 701 drivers reached the end of the event, but Mazet was five laps behind the winner, in 16th position, while Jean was unclassified and crossed the finish line nine laps in arrears. The last appearance of a March 701 in a Championship race was when Jean-Pierre Jarier took the wheel of Hahne's former lackluster mount for the 1971 Italian Grand Prix. He finished eight laps behind the leaders, unclassified and last.

There were a greater number of 701 entries for non-Championship races in 1971. Tom Wheatcroft had bought Chris Amon's regular 1970 car, chassis 701/1, direct from the factory, and entered Derek Bell for January's Argentine Grand Prix. He was joined by two other 701s: Jo Siffert in his own car and Pescarolo in the Williams entry. Siffert and Pescarolo finished second and third, respectively, in the event's first heat, with Bell a lap down in seventh. However, in the second heat both Siffert and Bell suffered mechanical failures, but Pescarolo again finished second. This gave Pescarolo second place on aggregate, beaten by Amon's Matra that had won the second heat by over 22 seconds. No other 701 entries in 1971 resulted in a podium finish.

=== Historic racing ===
All of the March 701 cars built in 1970 survived their contemporary front-line racing career intact (to a greater or lesser degree) and eventually became valuable collector's pieces. For some years the first car, Chris Amon's works chassis 701/1, was on display in the Donington Grand Prix Collection, mounted on a wall. Following Tyrrell's decision to become a constructor in their own right, their 701 cars were handed to Ford, who had provided finance for their initial purchase. One of the two original Team Tyrrell cars, 701/4, was restored to its original condition and as of October 2017 is on display in the British Motor Museum. Many others have been bought by private collectors and have subsequently appeared in historic racing competitions around the world.

==== Crash ====
On 2 September 2017, Frenchman David Ferrer crashed his 701 on the circuit of Zandvoort during the Historic Grand Prix. The crash happened in the Arie-Luyendijk corner. Later that week he died because of his severe wounds.

== Race results ==
=== World Championship results ===
(key) (results in bold indicate pole position; results in italics indicate fastest lap)

Year	Entrant	Tyres	Drivers	Grands Prix													Pts.	WCC
Year	Entrant	Tyres	Drivers	RSA	ESP	MON	BEL	NED	FRA	GBR	GER	AUT	ITA	CAN	USA	MEX	Pts.	WCC
1970	March Engineering	F	Chris Amon	Ret	Ret	Ret	2	Ret	2	5	Ret	8	7	3	5	4	**48**	**3rd**
1970	March Engineering	F	Jo Siffert	10	DNQ	8	7	Ret	Ret	Ret	8	9	Ret	Ret	9	Ret	**48**	**3rd**
1970	Tyrrell Racing Organisation	D	Jackie Stewart	**3**	1	**Ret**	**Ret**	2	9	Ret	Ret	Ret	2				**48**	**3rd**
1970	Tyrrell Racing Organisation	D	Johnny Servoz-Gavin	Ret	5	DNQ											**48**	**3rd**
1970	Tyrrell Racing Organisation	D	François Cevert					Ret	11	7	7	Ret	6	9	Ret	Ret	**48**	**3rd**
1970	STP Corporation	F	Mario Andretti	Ret	3					Ret	Ret	Ret					**48**	**3rd**
1970	Antique Automobiles Racing Team	G	Ronnie Peterson			7	NC										**48**	**3rd**
1970	Colin Crabbe Racing	G	Ronnie Peterson					9	Ret	9	Ret		Ret	NC	11		**48**	**3rd**
1970	Hubert Hahne	F	Hubert Hahne								DNQ						**48**	**3rd**
1971				RSA	ESP	MON	NED	FRA	GBR	GER	AUT	ITA	CAN	USA			33 (34)^{†}	4th^{†}
1971	Frank Williams Racing Cars	G	Henri Pescarolo	11													33 (34)^{†}	4th^{†}
1971	Frank Williams Racing Cars	G	Max Jean					NC									33 (34)^{†}	4th^{†}
1971	Team Gunston	F	John Love	Ret													33 (34)^{†}	4th^{†}
1971	Jo Siffert Automobiles	F	François Mazet					13									33 (34)^{†}	4th^{†}
1971	Shell Arnold	G	Jean-Pierre Jarier									NC					33 (34)^{†}	4th^{†}

^{†} Points within parentheses are total points scored, while those without are those that counted toward Championship results. All points were scored by March 711 entries.

=== Non-Championship results ===
(key) (results in bold indicate pole position; results in italics indicate fastest lap)

Year	Entrant	Tyres	Drivers	1	2	3	4	5	6	7	8
Year	Entrant	Tyres	Drivers	ROC	INT	OUL					
1970	March Engineering	**F**	Chris Amon	Ret	**1**						
1970	Tyrrell Racing Organisation	**D**	Jackie Stewart	**1**	2						
1971				ARG	ROC	QUE	SPR	INT	RIN	OUL	VIC
1971	Frank Williams Racing Cars	**G**	Henri Pescarolo	2							
1971	Frank Williams Racing Cars	**G**	Ray Allen		6				Ret		
1971	Frank Williams Racing Cars	**G**	Derek Bell			15					
1971	Frank Williams Racing Cars	**G**	Cyd Williams				DNS				
1971	Frank Williams Racing Cars	**G**	Tony Trimmer							Ret	
1971	Tom Wheatcroft Racing	**F**	Derek Bell	5							
1971	Jo Siffert Automobiles	**F**	Jo Siffert	Ret							
1971	Jo Siffert Automobiles	**F**	Alan Rollinson				5				
1971	Jo Siffert Automobiles	**F**	Xavier Perrot						11		
1971	Clarke-Mordaunt-Guthrie Racing	**F**	Mike Beuttler		Ret		Ret	10	NC		
1971	STP Corporation	**G**	John Cannon			12					
1971	Shell Arnold	**F**	Jean-Pierre Jarier							10	
