= Formula One drivers from France =

List of Formula One drivers who competed as French

- Drivers: 74
- Grands Prix: 1036
- Entries: 3275
- Starts: 3072
- Best season finish: 1st (1985, 1986, 1989, 1993)
- Wins: 81
- Podiums: 316
- Pole positions: 80
- Fastest laps: 92
- Points: 3938.47 (Note: 2 points less than what's shown on StatsF1, since Nano da Silva Ramos is incorrectly listed there as racing under French license while he was actually racing under Brazilian license.)
- First entry: 1950 British Grand Prix
- First win: 1955 Monaco Grand Prix
- Latest win: 2021 Hungarian Grand Prix
- Latest entry: 2026 Las Vegas Grand Prix
- 2026 drivers: Pierre Gasly; Isack Hadjar; Esteban Ocon

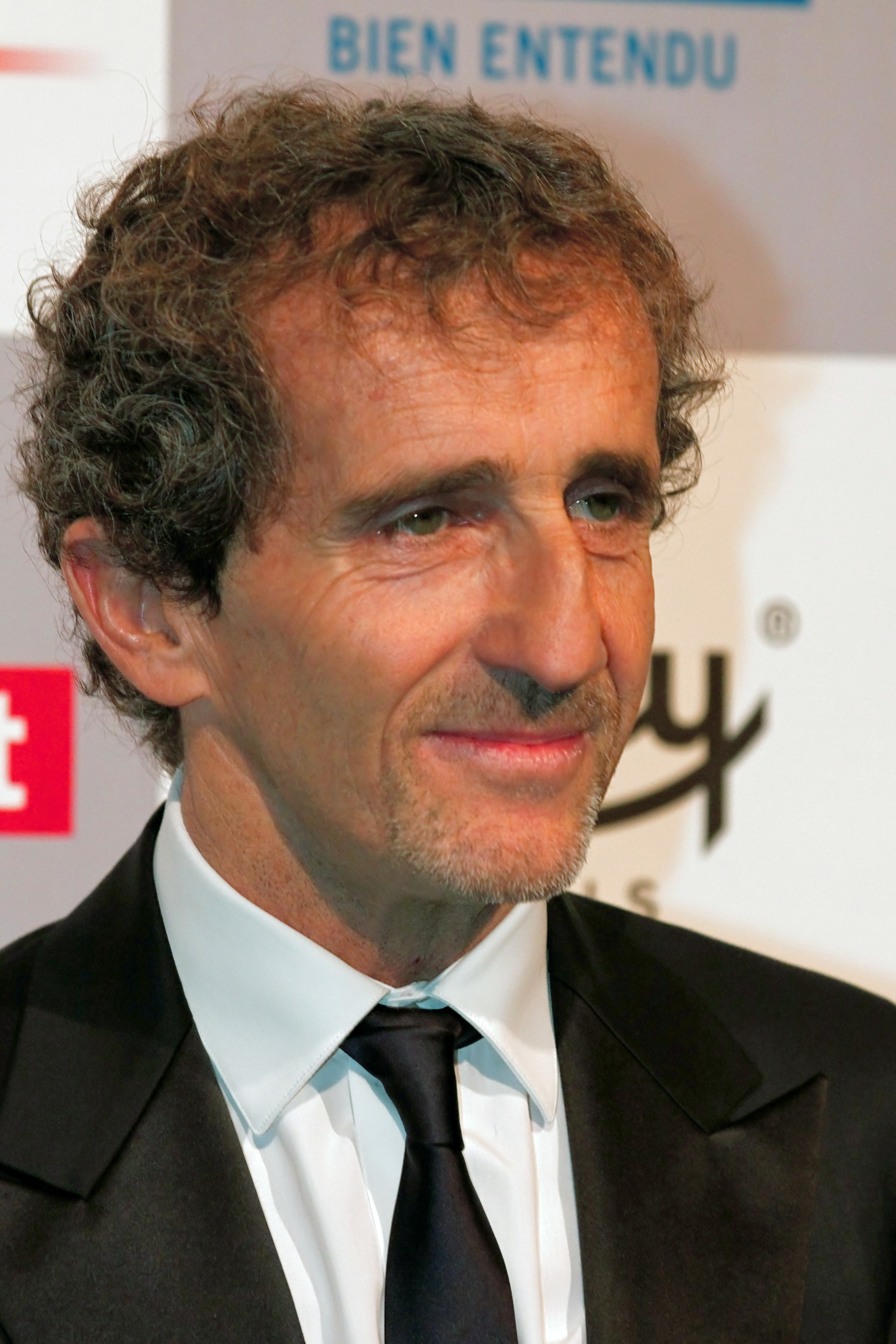
Alain Prost in 2012

There have been 74 Formula One drivers from France, the most successful of them being Alain Prost, who won the World Drivers' Championship four times.

== World champions and race winners ==
The title has been won by a French driver on four occasions, all of which were victories for Alain Prost. Thirteen other drivers have won at least one race, though they are all far behind Prost's tally of 51 wins.

- Alain Prost debuted with McLaren in 1980. He finished in the points on four occasions but only finished 16th overall, moving to Renault for the following season. After three successful years, including finishing the 1983 season as the championship runner-up, he returned to McLaren. Prost drove with the team between 1984 and 1989, winning the championship three times and coming second twice. During this time McLaren introduced a new team-mate for Prost – Ayrton Senna. Their relationship was difficult and the pair clashed on and off the track, leading to it being described as "one of the sport's greatest ever rivalries". Prost joined Ferrari in 1990 and resumed his battle with Senna, losing the championship at the penultimate race of the season after the pair collided. In 1991 the Ferrari was uncompetitive and for the first time since his debut season Prost was unable to win a race. He publicly slated the team for their performances and was subsequently fired before the end of the year. He took a year off in 1992 and returned for one last season in 1993, winning his fourth championship.

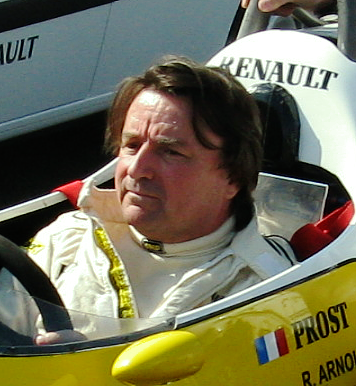
René Arnoux in 2008

- René Arnoux won seven races during a career that spanned 12 years, having made his debut in 1978 with Martini. The team folded part way through the season, and he secured a drive with Renault for the following year. For some of his time there he partnered Alain Prost, and he controversially ignored team orders to win the 1982 French Grand Prix ahead of his favoured teammate. He moved to Scuderia Ferrari and enjoyed his most successful season, winning three races and finishing third in the championship. Ligier signed Arnoux for four seasons from 1986 and he retired after several years of poor performance.
- Jacques Laffite, who developed Ligier race cars, won six races and finished fourth in the drivers title in three successive seasons (1979–1981) : he was the first French driver to win a Grand Prix, in Sweden, for a French team, with a French car and a French engine (Matra V12). His Formula One career began in 1974 and ended with a serious accident at the 1986 British Grand Prix, though he still raced in other disciplines.

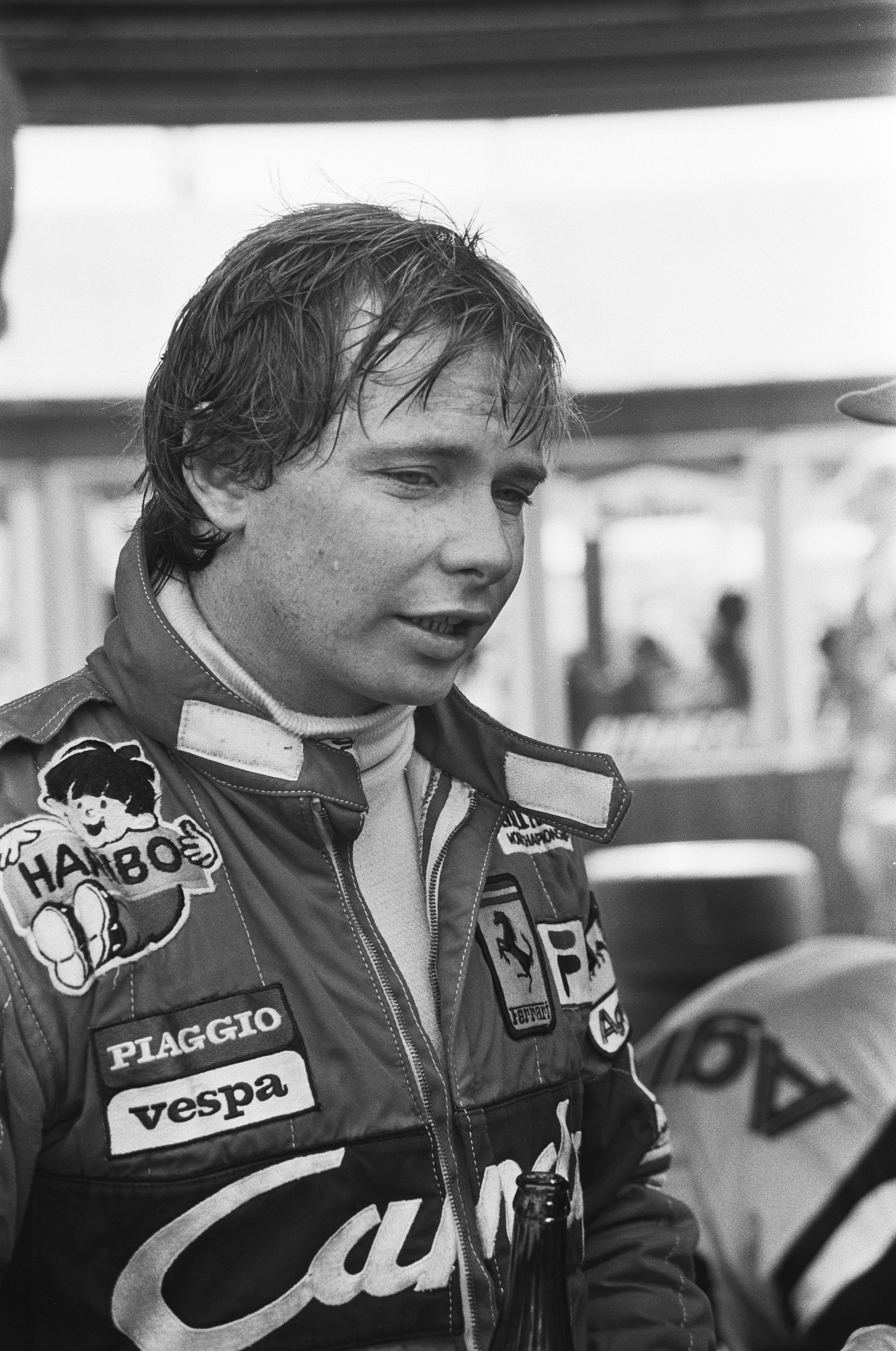
Didier Pironi in 1982

- Didier Pironi started his Formula One career in 1978 with Tyrrell. He moved to Ligier in 1980 alongside compatriot Jacques Laffite, frequently outpacing the team leader. He won that year's Belgian Grand Prix and finished fifth in the championship. He signed with Ferrari as partner to Gilles Villeneuve but could not keep pace with the French-Canadian. In 1982, the year of Villeneuve's death, Pironi looked set to win the championship having won two races and finished on the podium six times. At the German Grand Prix he crashed during a practice session, breaking his legs and ending both his title challenge and his career.
- Patrick Tambay made his Formula One debut in 1977 with Ensign. He signed for McLaren for his second year in the sport but the car was never particularly competitive. He left the team at the end of 1979, being replaced by Alain Prost for his first year in the sport. Tambay returned in 1981 after a year in the US but was dropped at the end of the season. He announced his retirement but was asked to drive for Ferrari for the second half of the 1982 season after the death of their driver, and close friend of Tambay, Gilles Villeneuve. He won one race and stayed with Ferrari for the following season, winning once more. After two years with Renault and one with Lola he retired for a second time.
- Maurice Trintignant competed in the inaugural season of the Formula One World Championship, debuting at the 1950 Monaco Grand Prix in a Simca-Gordini. He became the first French driver to win a World Championship Grand Prix at the 1955 edition of the same event. His only other race win also came at the Monaco Grand Prix, in 1958. He retired in 1964 having raced with ten different teams.

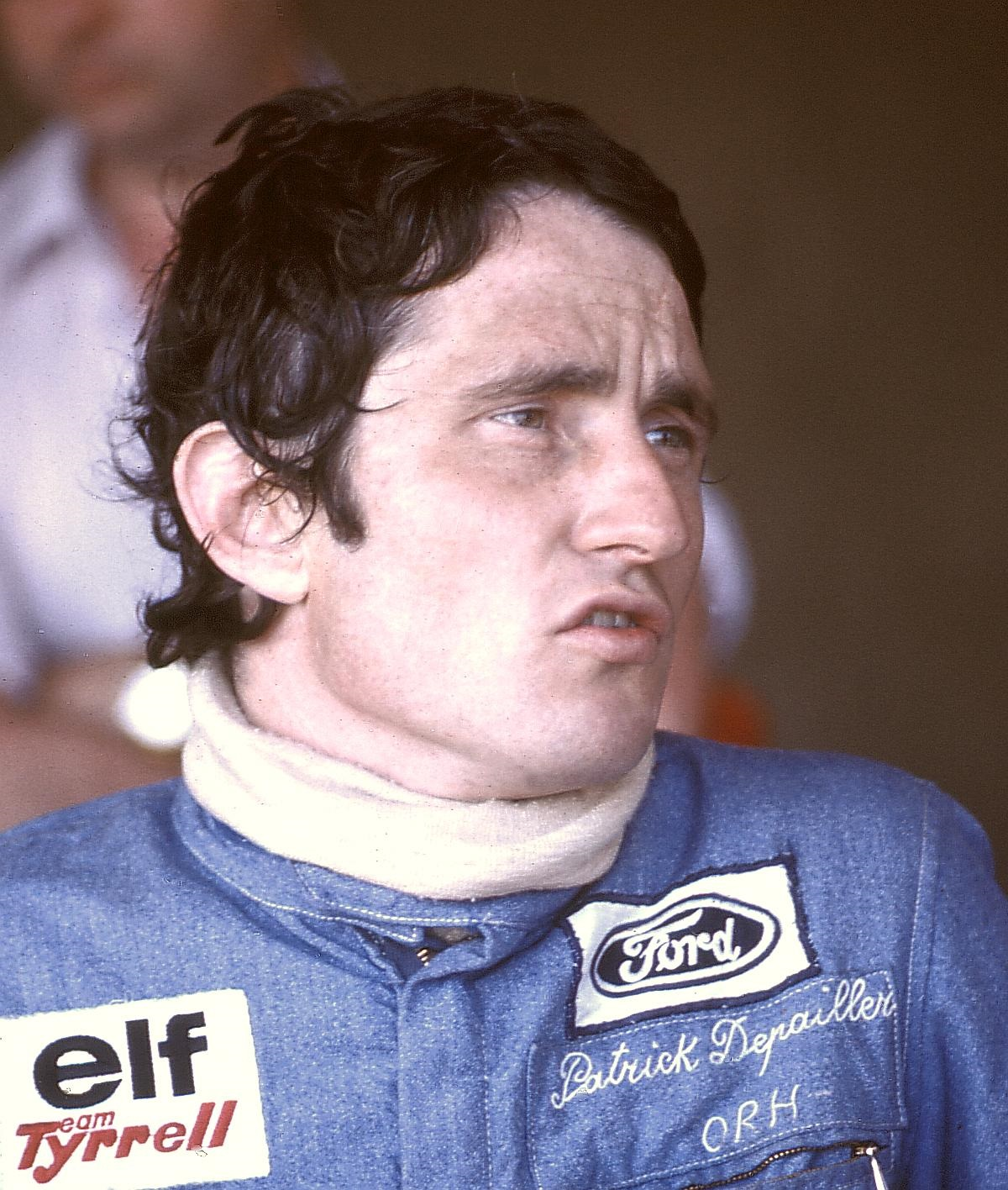
Patrick Depailler in 1975

- Patrick Depailler, who developed and drove the 6-wheeled Tyrrell P34, won the 1978 Monaco Grand Prix for the British team (albeit in a conventional 4-wheeled car, shortly after the P34 experiment was abandoned) and the 1979 Spanish Grand Prix for Ligier. He died at the Hockenheimring, during testing ahead of the 1980 German Grand Prix.
- Jean-Pierre Jabouille, who developed and drove the Renault turbo, won the 1979 French Grand Prix and the 1980 Austrian Grand Prix for the French team.
- François Cevert won the 1971 United States Grand Prix for Tyrrell. He died after an accident in practice of 1973 United States Grand Prix.
- Jean-Pierre Beltoise, iconic Matra driver, won the 1972 Monaco Grand Prix for BRM.

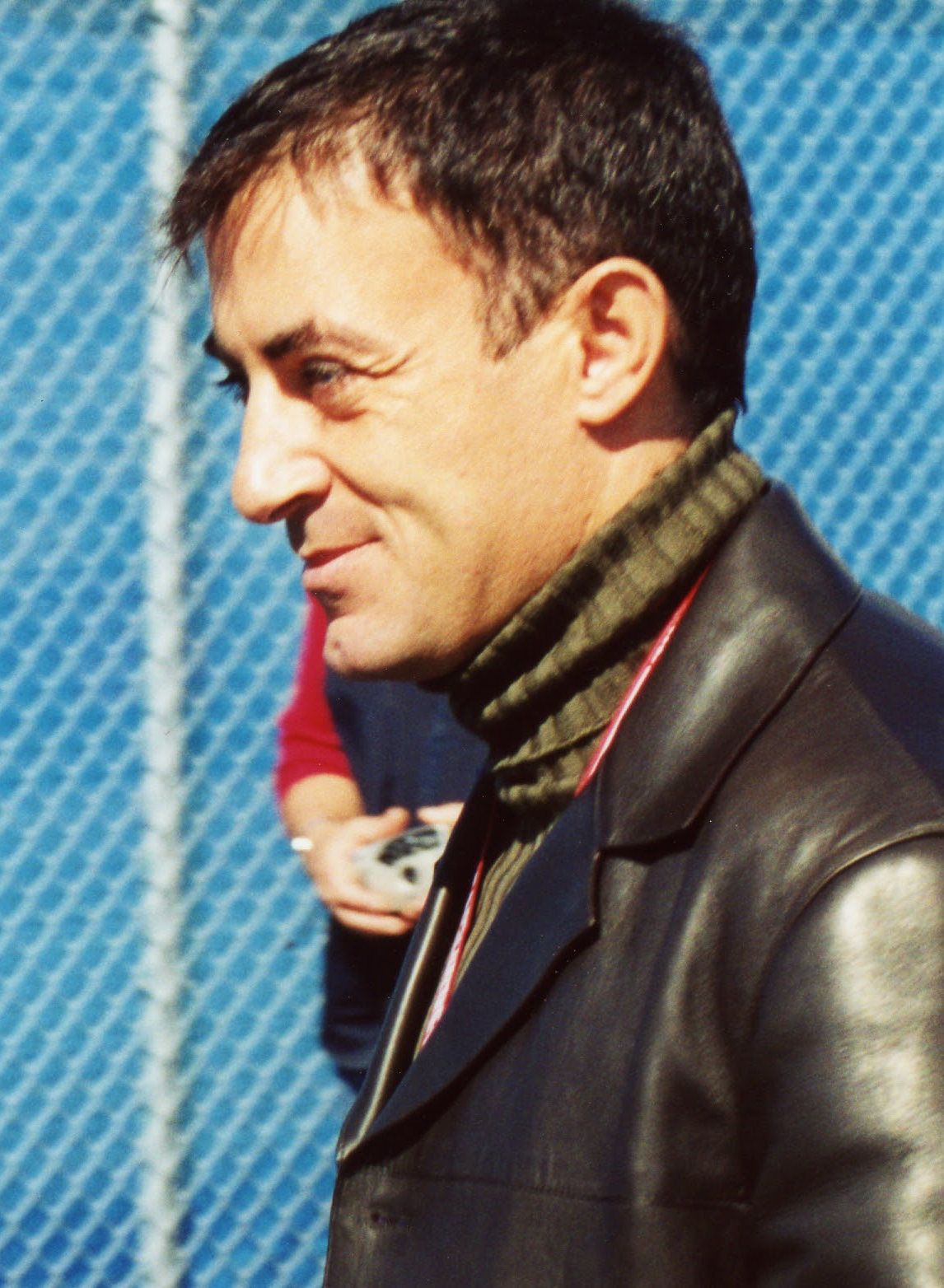
Jean Alesi in 2001

- Jean Alesi is the only French driver to be in the "200-plus club", having competed in 201 races and being one of only a small number of drivers to reach the landmark. He made his debut in 1989 and raced with a variety of teams until his retirement in 2001. He scored 32 podium finishes but only won one race – the 1995 Canadian Grand Prix.
- Olivier Panis won in Monaco in 1996 when only three cars finished the wet race. It was his only win.

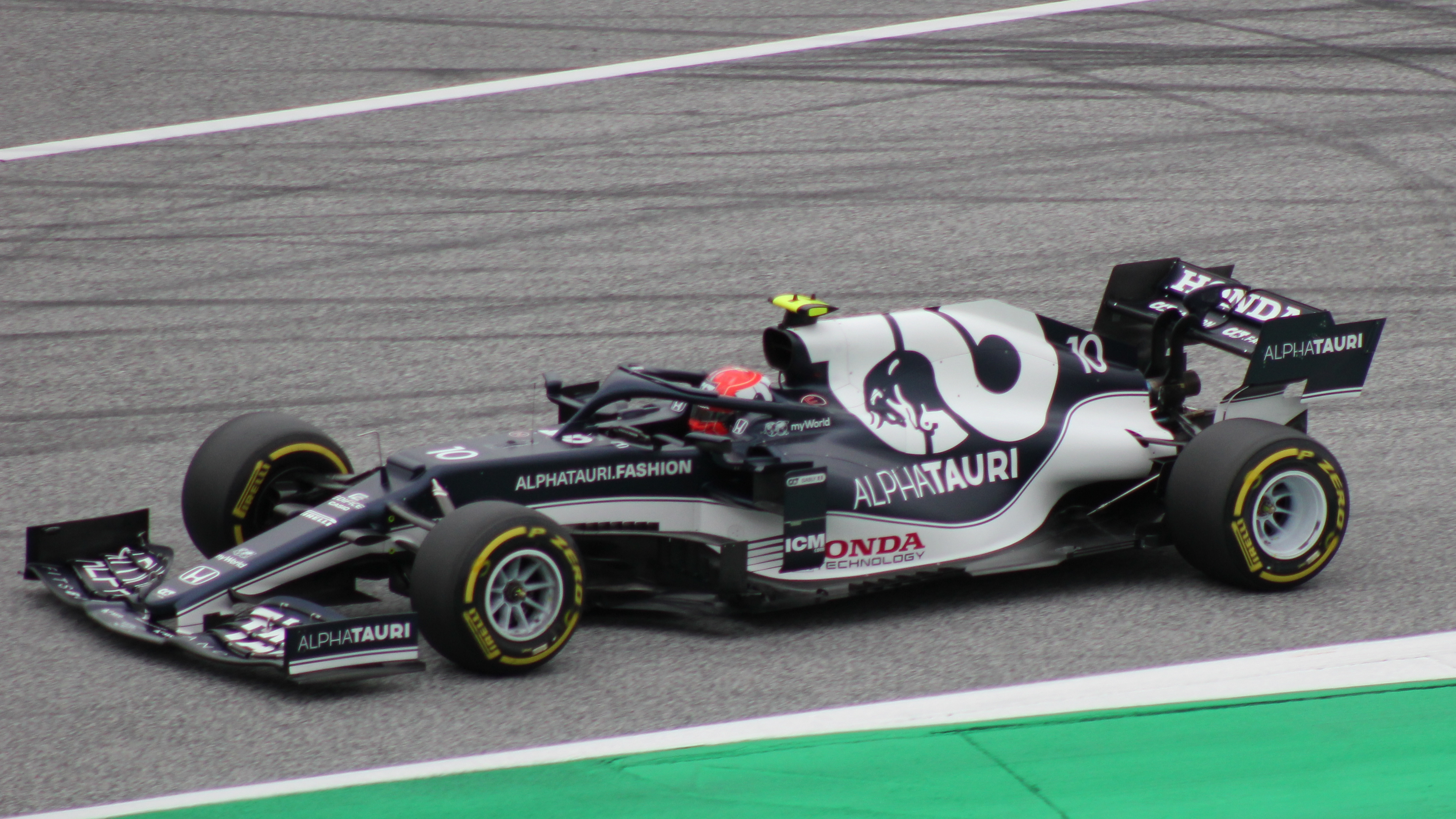
Gasly driving for AlphaTauri at the 2021 Austrian Grand Prix

- Pierre Gasly won the 2020 Italian Grand Prix.

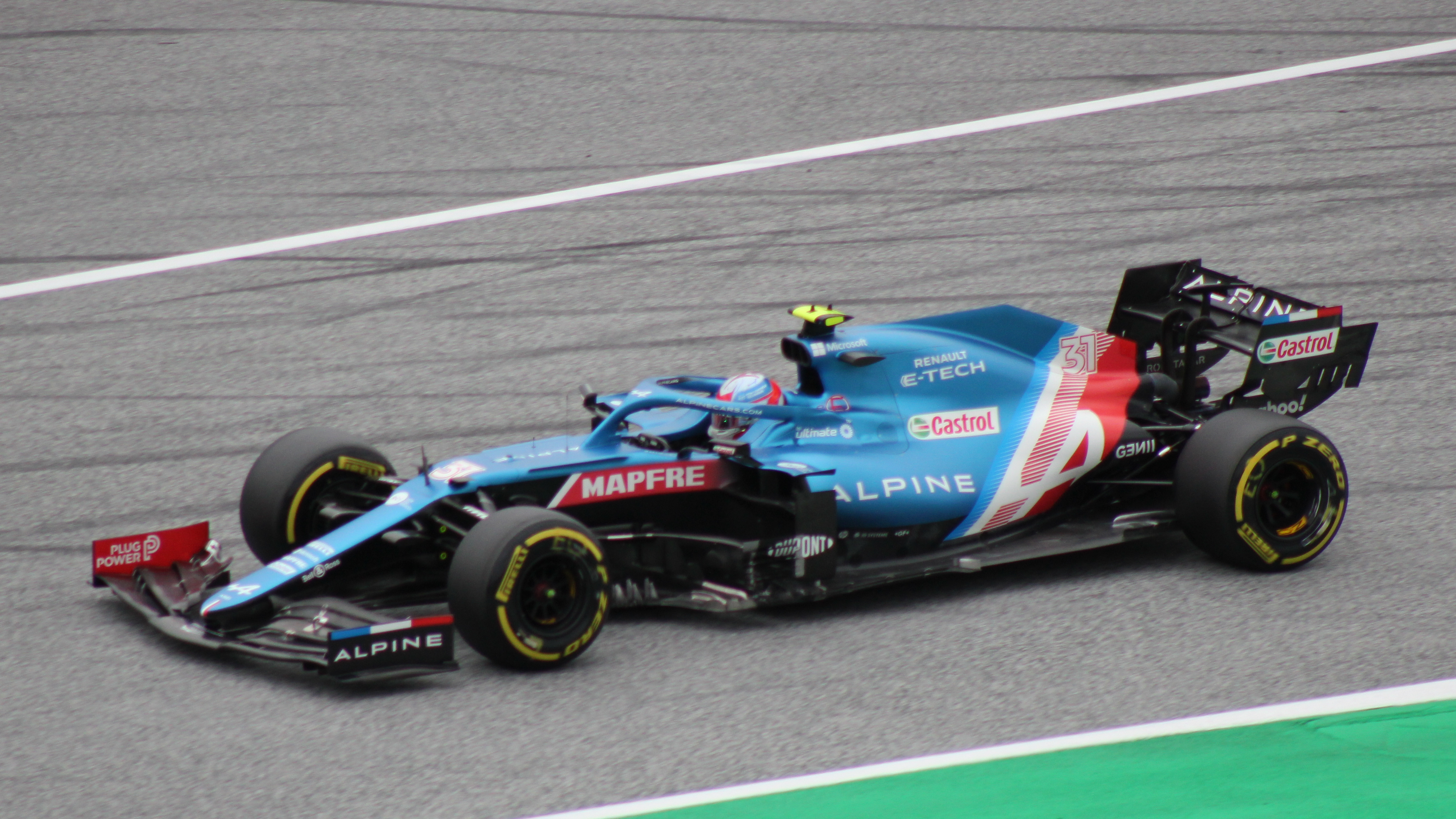
Ocon driving for Alpine-Renault at the 2021 Austrian Grand Prix

- Esteban Ocon is the most recent French driver to have secured a race victory, winning at the 2021 Hungarian Grand Prix.

== Driver statistics ==
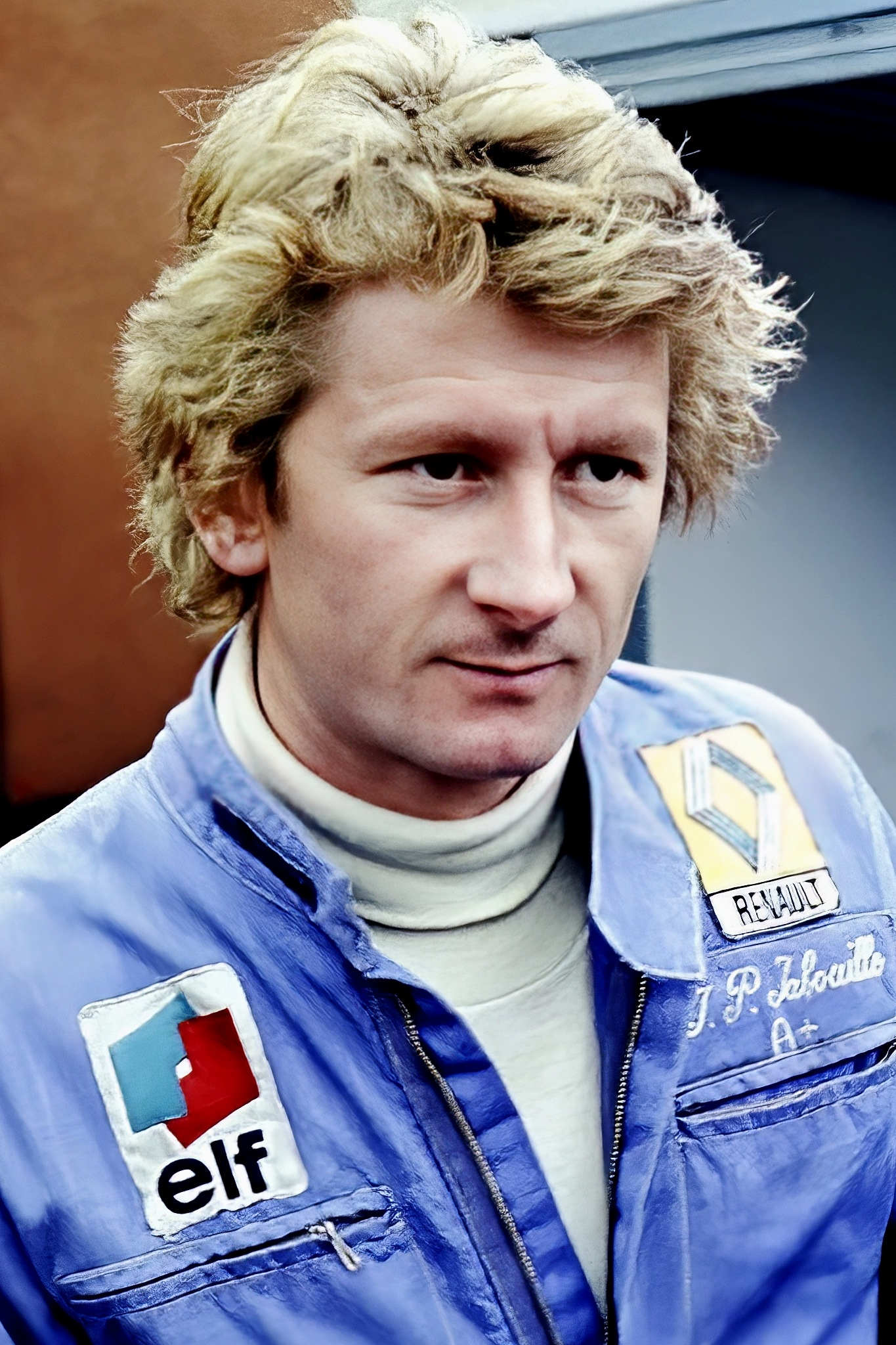
Jean-Pierre Jabouille in 1975

Drivers	Active Years	Entries	Wins	Podiums	Career Points	Poles	Fastest Laps	Championships
Eugène Chaboud	1950–1951	3	0	0	1	0	0	-
Philippe Étancelin	1950–1952	12	0	0	3	0	0	-
Yves Giraud-Cabantous	1950–1953	13	0	0	5	0	0	-
Pierre Levegh	1950–1951	6	0	0	0	0	0	-
Henri Louveau	1950–1951	2	0	0	0	0	0	-
Guy Mairesse	1950–1951	3	0	0	0	0	0	-
Robert Manzon	1950–1956	29 (28 starts)	0	2	16	0	0	-
Eugène Martin	1950	2	0	0	0	0	0	-
Charles Pozzi	1950	1	0	0	0	0	0	-
Louis Rosier	1950–1956	38	0	2	18	0	0	-
Raymond Sommer	1950	5	0	0	3	0	0	-
Maurice Trintignant	1950–1964	84 (81 starts) (Note: Trintignant got sick before the race at Italy in 1951, and was secretly replaced by Jean Behra. Team principal Amédée Gordini did not inform the race organizers about the switch as it would have cut the team's starting fee. Since the organizers were not informed about the driver change Trintignant was initially credited with the race start and some sources still do.)	2	10	72 1/3	0	1	-
Aldo Gordini	1951	1	0	0	0	0	0	-
Georges Grignard	1951	1	0	0	0	0	0	-
André Simon	1951–1952, 1955–1957	12 (11 starts)	0	0	0	0	0	-
Marcel Balsa	1952	1	0	0	0	0	0	-
Élie Bayol	1952–1956	8 (7 starts)	0	0	2	0	0	-
Jean Behra	1951–1959	54 (53 starts) (Note: Behra secretly replaced the unwell Maurice Trintignant for the race of the 1951 Italian Grand Prix. Team principal Amédée Gordini did not inform the race organizers about the switch as it would have cut the team's starting fee. Behra competed in the race but wasn't officially credited with the race start.)	0	9	51 1/7	0	1	-
Roger Loyer	1954	1	0	0	0	0	0	-
Jacques Pollet	1954–1955	5	0	0	0	0	0	-
Jean Lucas	1955	1	0	0	0	0	0	-
Mike Sparken	1955	1	0	0	0	0	0	-
André Guelfi	1958	1	0	0	0	0	0	-
François Picard	1958	1	0	0	0	0	0	-
Jean Lucienbonnet	1959	1 (0 starts)	0	0	0	0	0	-
Bernard Collomb	1961–1964	6 (4 starts)	0	0	0	0	0	-
Guy Ligier	1966–1967	13 (12 starts)	0	0	1	0	0	-
Jo Schlesser	1966–1968	3	0	0	0	0	0	-
Jean-Pierre Beltoise	1966–1974	88 (86 starts)	1	8	77	0	4	-
Johnny Servoz-Gavin	1967–1970	13 (12 starts)	0	1	9	0	0	-
Henri Pescarolo	1968–1974, 1976	64 (57 starts)	0	1	12	0	1	-
François Cevert	1969–1973	48 (47 starts)	1	13	89	0	2	-
Jean-Pierre Jarier	1971, 1973–1983	143 (134 starts)	0	3	31.5	3	3	-
Max Jean	1971	1	0	0	0	0	0	-
François Mazet	1971	1	0	0	0	0	0	-
Patrick Depailler	1972, 1974–1980	95	2	19	139 (141)	1	4	-
François Migault	1972, 1974–1975	16 (13 starts)	0	0	0	0	0	-
José Dolhem	1974	3 (1 start)	0	0	0	0	0	-
Jean-Pierre Jabouille	1974–1975, 1977–1981	55 (49 starts)	2	2	21	6	0	-
Jacques Laffite	1974–1986	180 (176 starts)	6	32	228	7	7	-
Gérard Larrousse	1974	2 (1 start)	0	0	0	0	0	-
Michel Leclère	1975–1976	8 (7 starts)	0	0	0	0	0	-
Patrick Tambay	1977–1979, 1981–1986	123 (114 starts)	2	11	103	5	2	-
René Arnoux	1978–1989	164 (149 starts)	7	22	181	18	12	-
Didier Pironi	1978–1982	72 (70 starts)	3	13	101	4	5	-
Patrick Gaillard	1979	5 (2 starts)	0	0	0	0	0	-
Alain Prost	1980–1991, 1993	202 (199 starts)	51	106	768.5 (798.5)	33	41	4 (1985, 1986, 1989, 1993)
Jean-Louis Schlesser	1983, 1988	2 (1 start)	0	0	0	0	0	-
Philippe Alliot	1984–1990, 1993–1994	116 (109 starts)	0	0	7	0	0	-
François Hesnault	1984–1985	21 (19 starts)	0	0	7	0	0	-
Philippe Streiff	1984–1988	54 (53 starts)	0	1	11	0	0	-
Yannick Dalmas	1987–1990, 1994	49 (23 starts)	0	0	0	0	0	-
Pascal Fabre	1987	14 (11 starts)	0	0	7	0	0	-
Pierre-Henri Raphanel	1988–1989	17 (1 start)	0	0	0	0	0	-
Jean Alesi	1989–2001	202 (201 starts)	1	32	241	2	4	-
Éric Bernard	1989–1991, 1994	47 (45 starts)	0	1	10	0	0	-
Olivier Grouillard	1989–1992	62 (41 starts)	0	0	1	0	0	-
Érik Comas	1991–1994	63 (59 starts)	0	0	7	0	0	-
Paul Belmondo	1992, 1994	27 (7 starts)	0	0	0	0	0	-
Bertrand Gachot	1992, 1994–1995	43 (32 starts)	0	0	1	0	0	-
Jean-Marc Gounon	1993–1994	9	0	0	0	0	0	-
Franck Lagorce	1994	2	0	0	0	0	0	-
Olivier Panis	1994–1999, 2001–2004	158 (157 starts)	1	5	76	0	0	-
Jean-Christophe Boullion	1995	11	0	0	3	0	0	-
Stéphane Sarrazin	1999	1	0	0	0	0	0	-
Franck Montagny	2006	7	0	0	0	0	0	-
Sébastien Bourdais	2008–2009	27	0	0	6	0	0	-
Romain Grosjean	2009, 2012–2020	181 (179 starts)	0	10	391	0	1	-
Charles Pic	2012–2013	39	0	0	0	0	0	-
Jean-Éric Vergne	2012–2014	58	0	0	51	0	0	-
Jules Bianchi	2013–2014	34	0	0	2	0	0	-
Esteban Ocon	2016–2018, 2020–2026	199 (198 starts)	1	4	490	0	1	-
Pierre Gasly	2017–2026	199 (197 starts)	1	5	500	1	3	-
Isack Hadjar	2025–2026	42 (40 starts)	0	4	173	0	0	-

== Current drivers ==
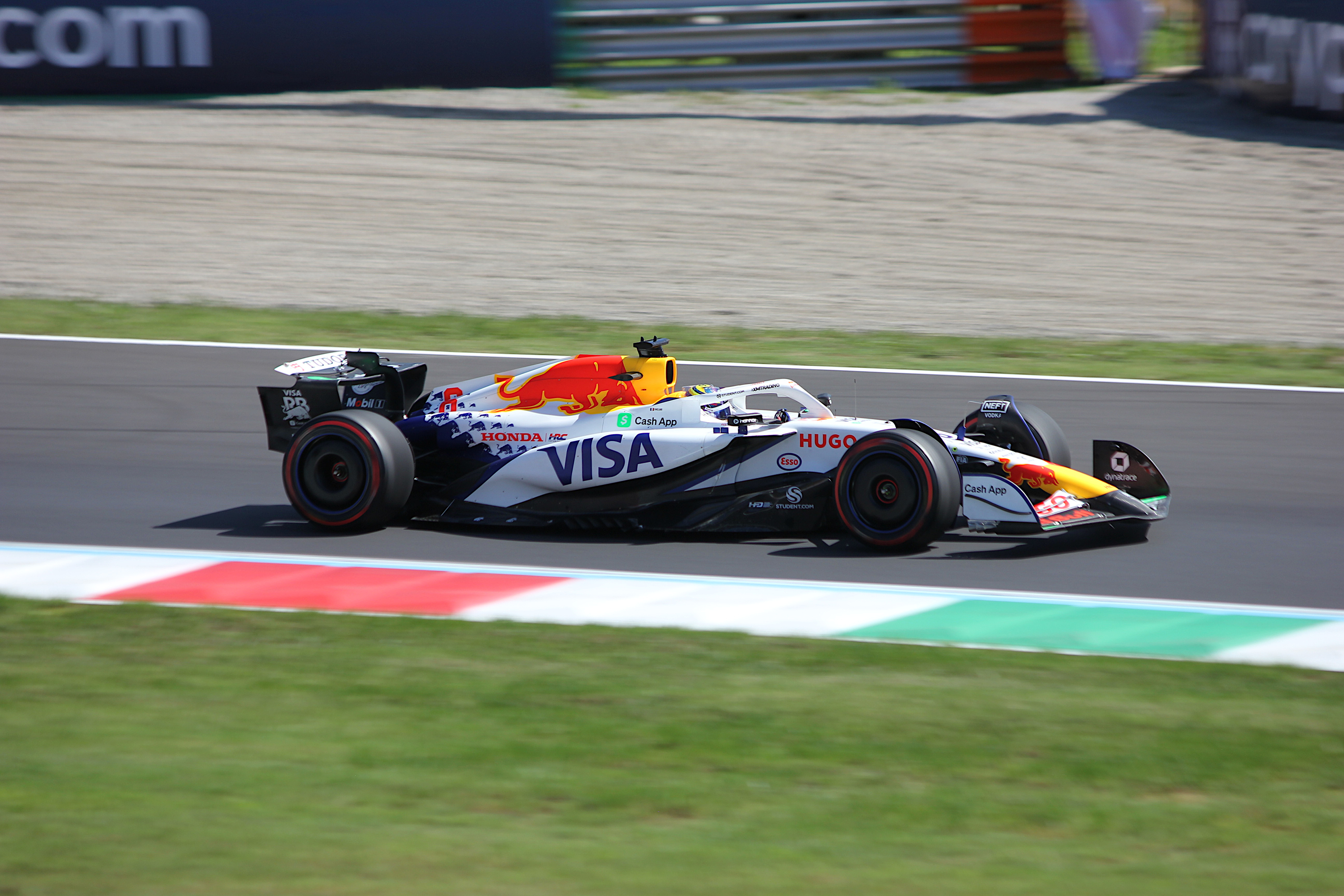
Hadjar driving for Racing Bulls at the 2025 Italian Grand Prix

In the 2026 Formula One World Championship, there are three French drivers.

Pierre Gasly made his debut for Scuderia Toro Rosso at the 2017 Malaysian Grand Prix. He was then promoted to Red Bull Racing for 2019 after Daniel Ricciardo left the team, before being demoted back to Toro Rosso mid-season. At the 2020 Italian Grand Prix, Gasly became the first French driver to win an F1 race since Olivier Panis in 1996. He is the most recent French podium finisher, achieving third at the 2026 Monaco Grand Prix.

Esteban Ocon made his debut at the 2016 Belgian Grand Prix. He is the most recent French race winner, having won the 2021 Hungarian Grand Prix.

Isack Hadjar made his debut for Racing Bulls in the 2025 season. He was then promoted to Red Bull Racing for 2026 after Yuki Tsunoda was relegated to a test and reserve driver role for Red Bull.

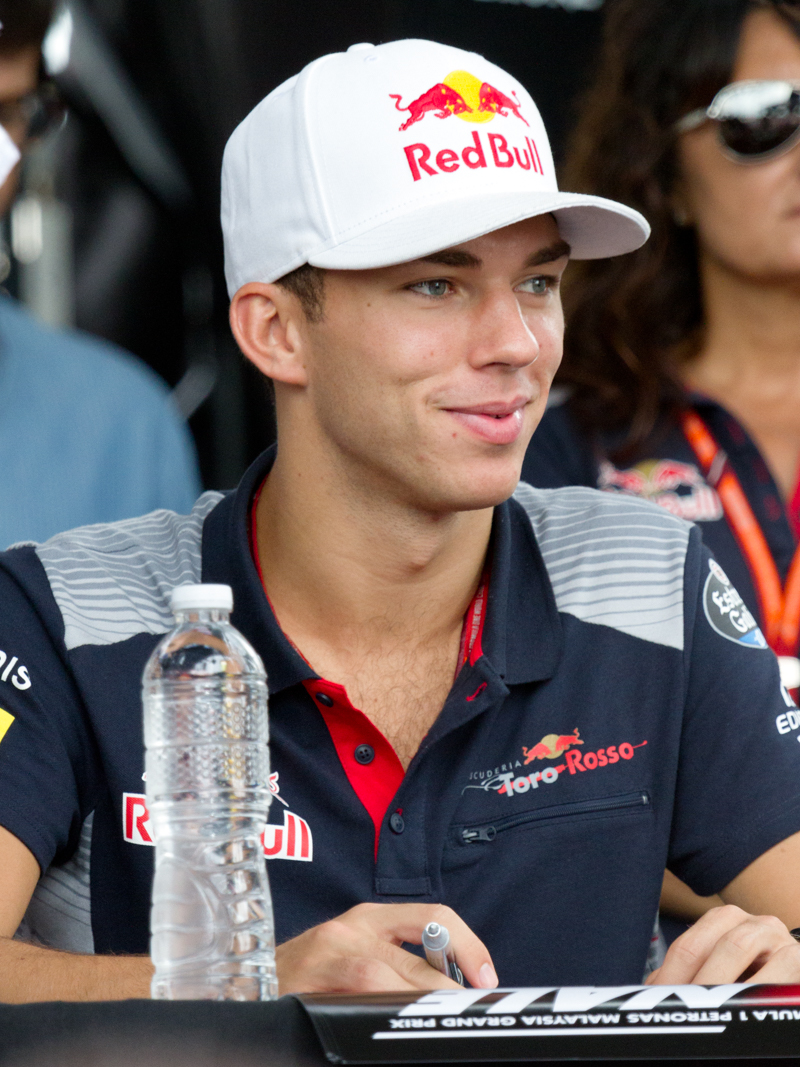
Pierre Gasly
2026 season position: 10th

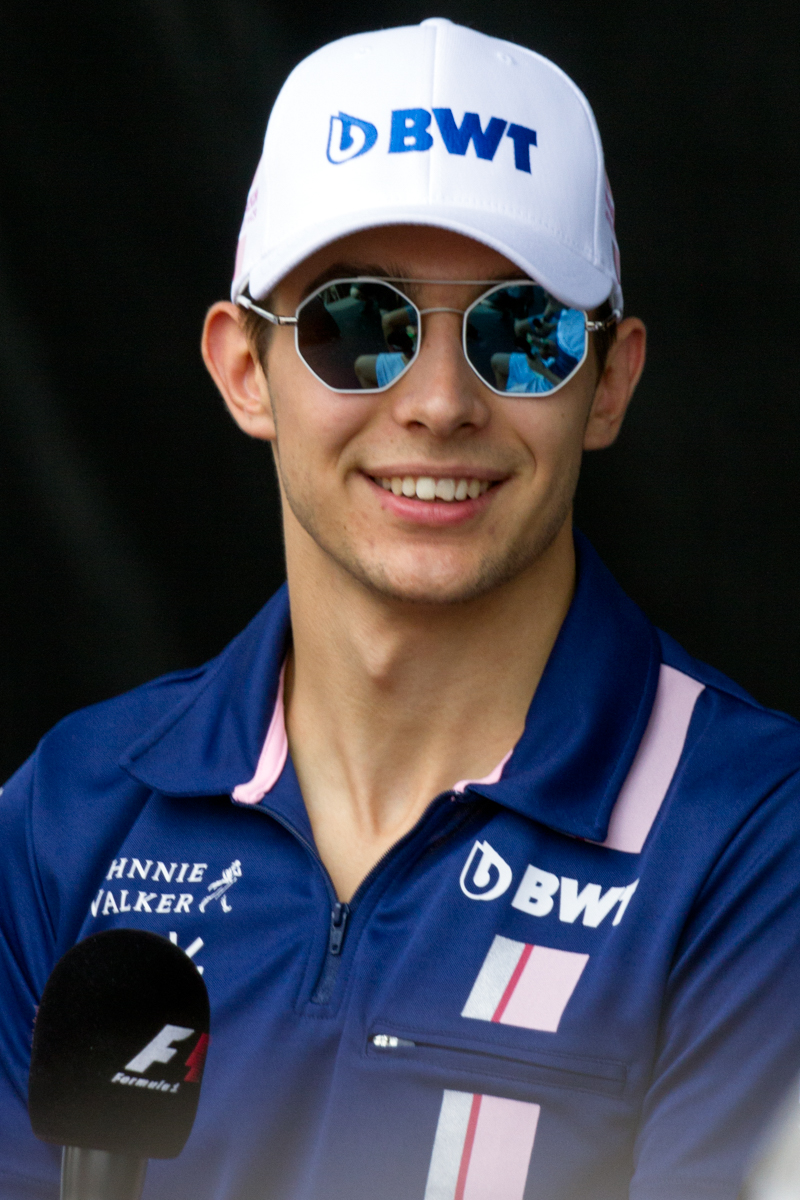
Esteban Ocon
2026 season position: 16th

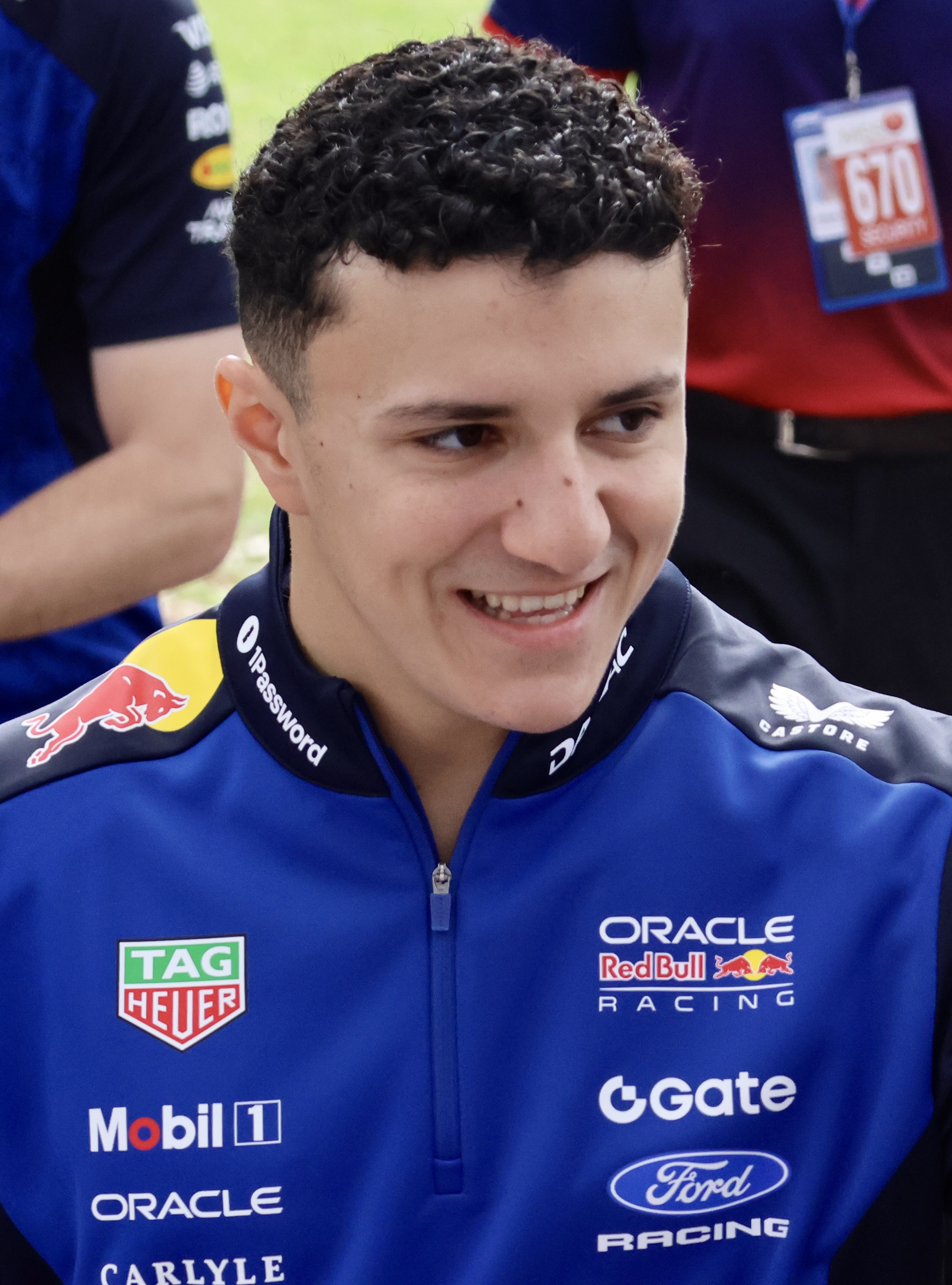
Isack Hadjar
2026 season position: 8th

== See also ==
- List of Formula One Grand Prix winners
- List of Formula One drivers
