= March 703 =

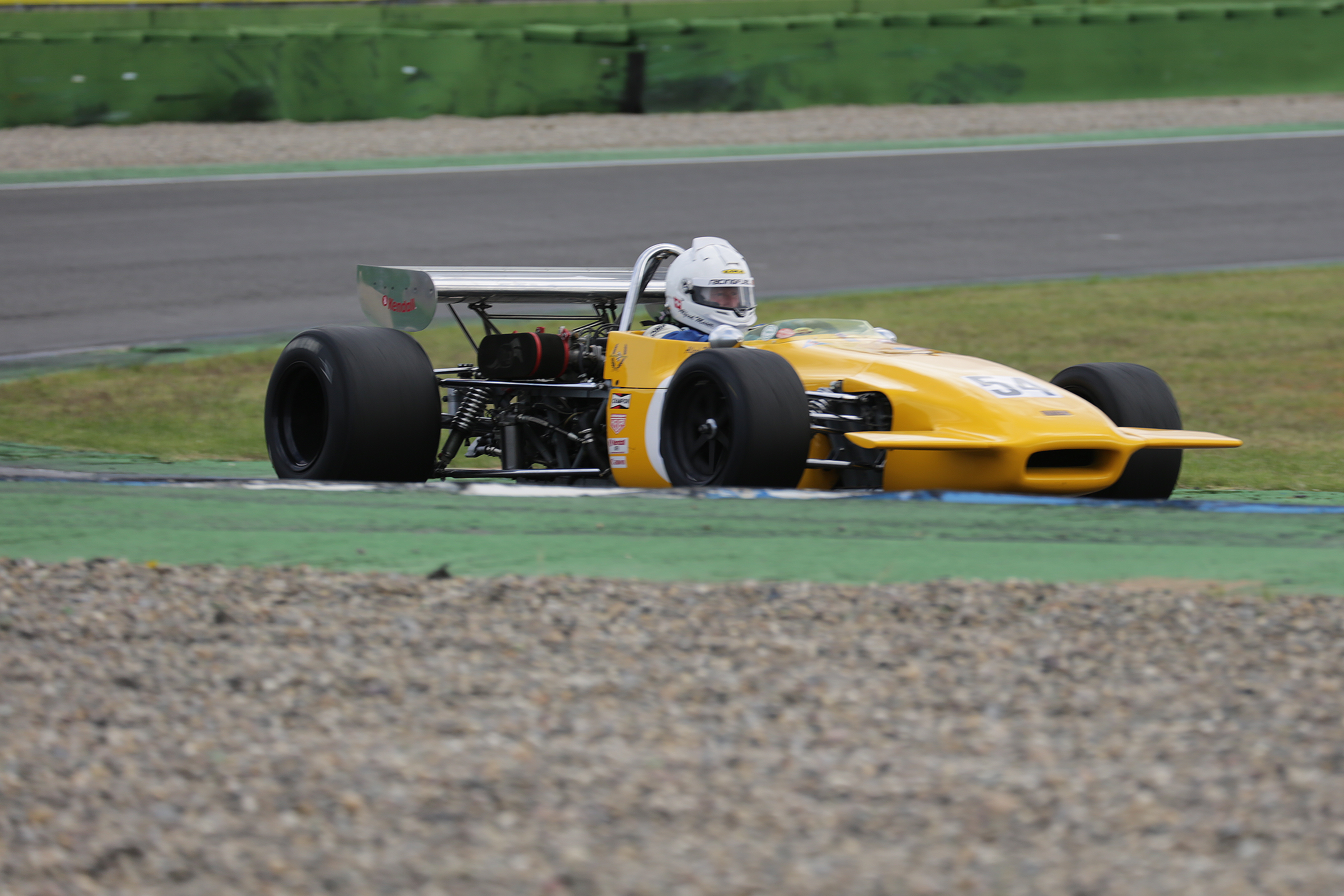
- March 713 F3 car
- Category: Formula 3
- Designer(s): Robin Herd
- Predecessor: March 693
- Successor: March 713

Technical specifications
- Chassis: Space frame

Competition history
- Notable drivers: (United Kingdom) Dave Morgan (United Kingdom) Tom Walkinshaw
Wins	Podiums
0	>1

The March 703 was a Formula 3 racing car built by March Engineering in 1970 and designed by Robin Herd with the chassis being a space frame.

== Design and development ==
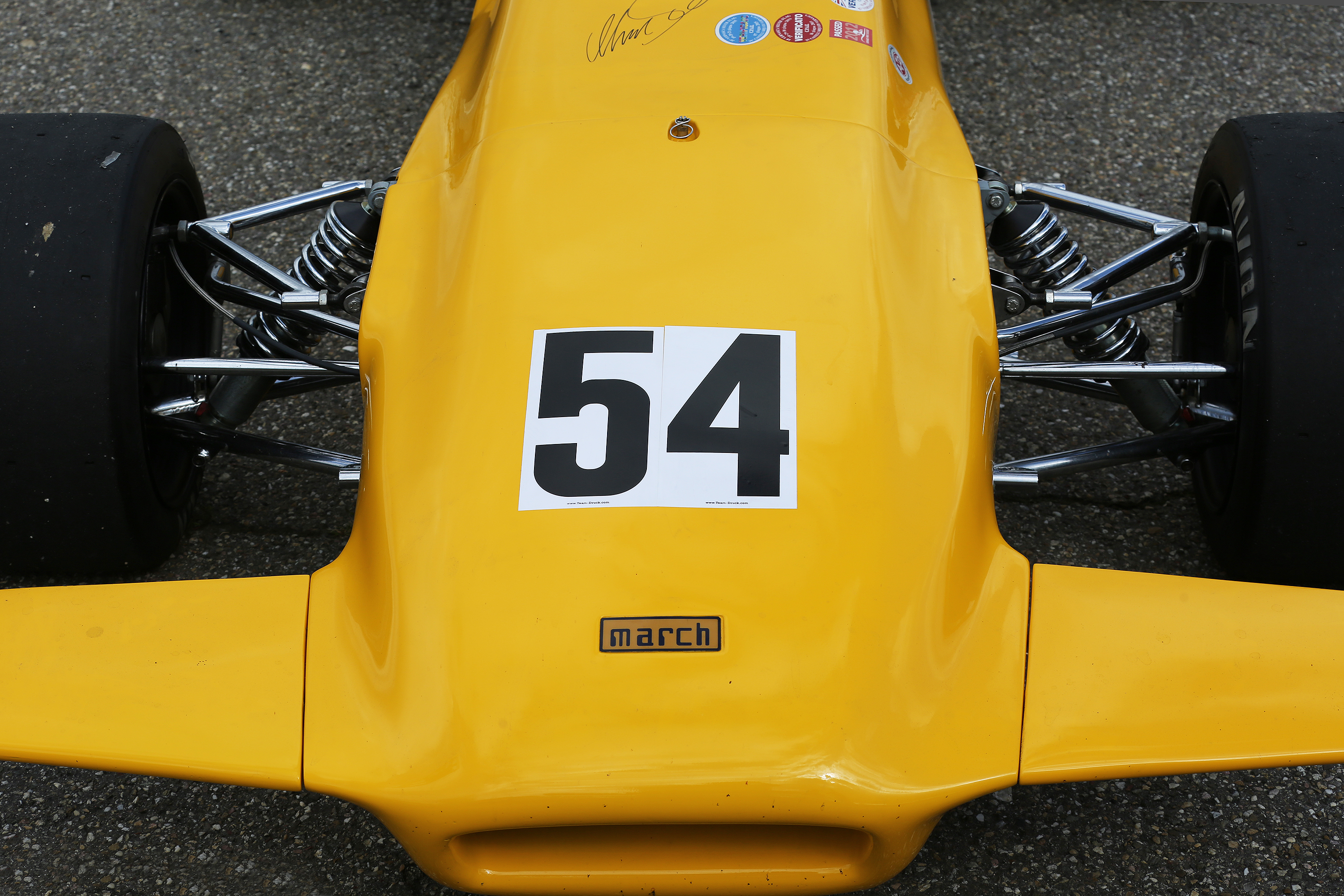
March 703 F3 front

The Mach 703 was the March 702's sister vehicle. Like the 702 built for Formula 2, the 703 was based on the 1969 693. The car was far too heavy for a Formula 3 car and sold poorly.

== Racing history ==
The 703s were used in the British Formula 3 Championship and neither driver was able to achieve a win with them. Only Dave Morgan managed a few podiums with his 703.
