= François Mazet =

French racing driver (born 1943)

- Born: 24 February 1943 (age 83); Paris, France

Formula One World Championship career
- Nationality: (France) French
- Active years: 1971
- Team: non-works March
- Entries: 1
- Championships: 0
- Wins: 0
- Podiums: 0
- Career points: 0
- Pole positions: 0
- Fastest laps: 0
- First entry: 1971 French Grand Prix

François Mazet (born 24 February 1943 in Paris) is a former racing driver from France. He participated in only one Formula One World Championship Grand Prix, finished 13th and scored no championship points.

Mazet won the French Formula Three Championship in 1969 with a Tecno, and moved to Formula Two (F2) with the Sports Motor team alongside Tim Schenken for 1970. It was not a successful move and with sponsorship from Shell Petroleum, Mazet raced Jo Siffert's F2 Chevron when Siffert was unavailable as well as touring cars for Ford Germany. The association with Siffert led to Mazet driving the team's March 701 at Paul Ricard in the 1971 French Grand Prix. This however, was his only attempt at Formula One.

After his racing career ended, Mazet was involved in the sponsorship of Lotus by Essex Petroleum in the 1980s.

Mazet now grows lemons in an orchard in Menton, making multiple press appearances to promote the fruit.

== Complete Formula One World Championship results ==
(key)

Year	Entrant	Chassis	Engine	1	2	3	4	5	6	7	8	9	10	11	WDC	Points
1971	Jo Siffert Automobiles	March 701	Cosworth V8	RSA	ESP	MON	NED	FRA; 13	GBR	GER	AUT	ITA	CAN	USA	NC	0

Sporting positions
Preceded by François Cevert	French Formula Three; Champion; 1969	Succeeded by Jean-Pierre Jaussaud
