= Max Jean =

French racing driver (born 1943)

- Born: 27 July 1943 (age 83); Marseille, France

Formula One World Championship career
- Nationality: (France) French
- Active years: 1971
- Team: Frank Williams Racing Cars
- Entries: 1
- Championships: 0
- Wins: 0
- Podiums: 0
- Career points: 0
- Pole positions: 0
- Fastest laps: 0
- First entry: 1971 French Grand Prix

24 Hours of Le Mans career
- Years: 1968
- Teams: André Moynet
- Best finish: DNF
- Class wins: 0

Max Jean (born 27 July 1943) is a French former racing driver who won the Formule France championship in 1968. In addition to numerous Formula Two and Formula Three entries, Jean participated in one Formula One Grand Prix, driving a March for Frank Williams Racing Cars in his home race on 4 July 1971. He scored no championship points.

== Career summary ==
Jean was born in Marseille. Early in his career, his name was incorrectly listed as Jean Max on an entry form and he was often known by this name subsequently. He was Formule France champion in 1968 – driving for the works GRAC team, and taking 11 victories from the series' 17 events – in a field that included future two-time 24 Hours of Le Mans race winner Gérard Larrousse and future Formula One driver Jean-Pierre Jarier. His success encouraged Ecurie GRAC to construct a Formula Three car for him to run in 1969, but results were meager. He finished tenth at the Pau round and seventh in Dijon, but these were his only two race finishes in the French championship and he frequently failed to qualify for races.

In 1970, Jean parted company from GRAC and secured funding from the lubricants manufacturer Motul to run a works-supported Tecno car. At the opening race of the season, in Nogaro, he finished in second position. He repeated this placing in the fourth and fifth rounds of the championship at Linas-Montlhéry and Magny-Cours. However, apart from a sixth placed finish in round eight at Dijon and ninth on aggregate at the second visit to Nogaro, he did not reach the finishing flag in any of his other appearances, having suffered from a variety of mechanical failures. Nevertheless, despite his disappointing performances in Formula Three, he was drafted into the works Tecno team for Formula Two races at Paul Ricard in France and Tulln-Langenlebarn in Austria, where he finished in seventh and 13th places, respectively.

In 1971 Jean took his Motul sponsorship to the independent Frank Williams Racing Cars team, and he drove their March 712M Formula Two car for them at Rouen and Pau. However, on both occasions he failed to finish. He also failed to qualify the car for the Monza Lottery race in June. His involvement with the Williams team gave Jean the opportunity to participate in his home Formula One event that year: the 1971 French Grand Prix at Paul Ricard in July. As Williams had upgraded their lead driver, Jean's compatriot Henri Pescarolo, to a 1971-model March 711 car the team's 1970-specification March 701 was available. Jean qualified the 701 in 23rd place in the 24 car field, but started in 22nd position following the withdrawal of March works driver Nanni Galli. During the race Jean's car suffered from a malfunctioning gearbox and he finished the race unclassified and last, nine laps behind the winner.

After 1971, Jean's racing activities reduced. In 1972 he took part in two Formula Two races for the Rondel Racing team, who also benefitted from Motul sponsorship. He failed to qualify the team's Brabham BT38 for the Pau round, and finished in 13th position in August's race at Albi. In 1973. Jean re-entered the French Formula Three championship, driving an Automobiles Martini car for the ORECA team. Following a season of low points and no points finishes and retirements, at the end of the year Motul cut their sponsorship and Jean retired.

Following the conclusion of his racing career, Jean built a successful family business in transport.

== Complete Formula One results ==
(key)

Year	Entrant	Chassis	Engine	1	2	3	4	5	6	7	8	9	10	11	WDC	Points
1971	Frank Williams Racing Cars	March 701	Ford Cosworth DFV 3.0 V8	RSA	ESP	MON	NED	FRA; NC	GBR	GER	AUT	ITA	CAN	USA	NC	0
