= March 693 =

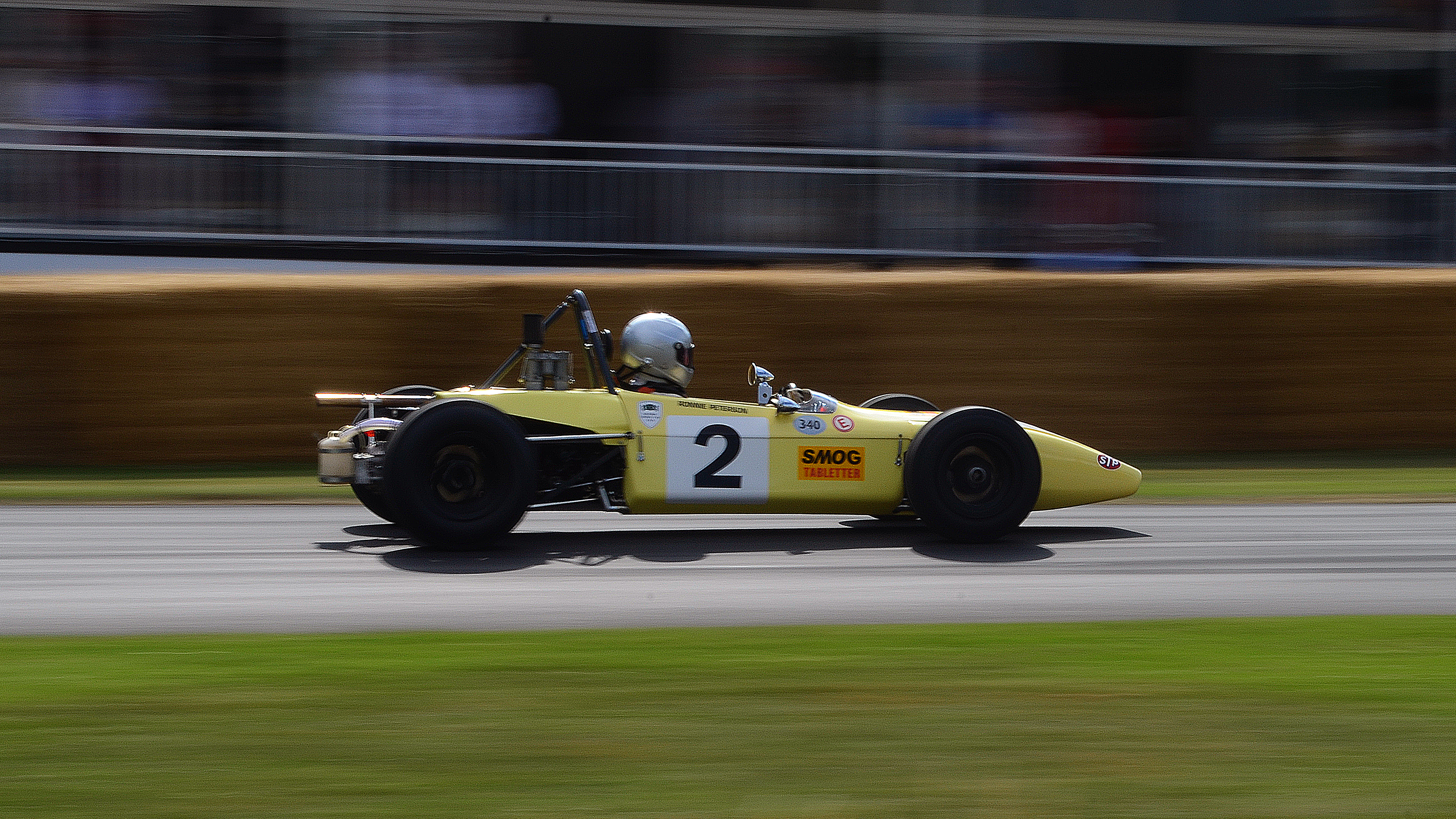
- March 693 at the 2019 Goodwood Festival of Speed.
- Category: Formula 3
- Successor: March 703

Technical specifications
- Chassis: Steel Space frame
- Engine: Ford 105E straight-four engine
- Transmission: Hewland 4-speed manual
- Weight: 400 kg (880 lb)
- Brakes: Disc brakes

Competition history
- Notable drivers: (Sweden) Ronnie Peterson (United Kingdom) James Hunt
- Debut: 1969
Races	Wins	Podiums
3	0	1

The March 693 was a Formula 3 racing car built and used by March Engineering in 1969. It was powered by a naturally aspirated, 997 cc (0.997 L; 60.8 cu in), Ford 105E straight-four engine, producing 120 hp (89 kW), and weighing in at a tiny 400 kg (880 lb).

The March 693 was a one-off and the first racing car to leave the new team's factory. The car had a simple square tube frame, the suspension was partly carried over from existing racing cars from Brabham and Lotus. Ronnie Peterson's first March race was in 1969 in the 693 at Cadwell Park, where he finished third. The car was only used twice by the works team. Ronnie Peterson had a serious accident with it during a race in Montlhéry. The car was repaired and James Hunt drove it in one round to the British Formula 3 Championship at Brands Hatch but had to retire.
