= 1971 French Grand Prix =

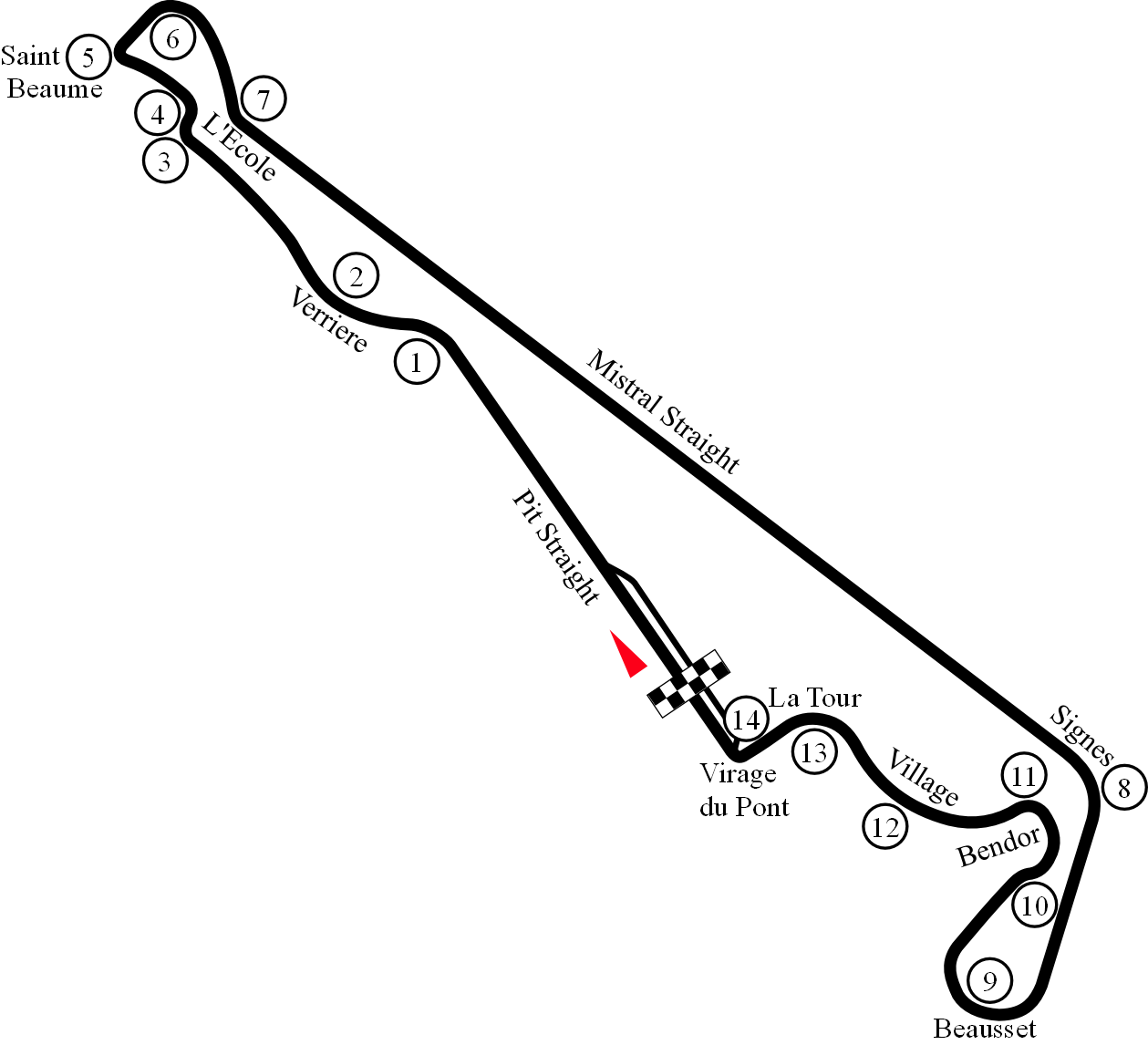

Race details
- Date: 4 July 1971
- Location: Circuit Paul Ricard; Le Castellet, Var, France
- Course: Permanent racing facility
- Course length: 5.809 km (3.610 miles)
- Distance: 55 laps, 319.495 km (198.525 miles)

Pole position
Driver	(United Kingdom) Jackie Stewart	Tyrrell-Ford
- Time: 1:50.71

Fastest lap
Driver	(United Kingdom) Jackie Stewart	Tyrrell-Ford
- Time: 1:54.09 on lap 2

Podium
First	(United Kingdom) Jackie Stewart	Tyrrell-Ford
Second	(France) François Cevert	Tyrrell-Ford
Third	(Brazil) Emerson Fittipaldi	Lotus-Ford

The 1971 French Grand Prix was a Formula One motor race held at the Circuit Paul Ricard on 4 July 1971. It was race 5 of 11 in both the 1971 World Championship of Drivers and the 1971 International Cup for Formula One Manufacturers. The 55-lap race was won by Tyrrell driver Jackie Stewart after he started from pole position. His teammate François Cevert finished second and Lotus driver Emerson Fittipaldi came in third.

== Race report ==
This was the first French Grand Prix to be held at the new Circuit Paul Ricard near Marseille. The Tyrrell team had new front bodywork for Jackie Stewart's car, and the Briton gained pole position with this revised car – also helped by extensive tyre testing in the weeks before – from Clay Regazzoni, Jacky Ickx and Graham Hill. Stewart led away from Regazzoni, Pedro Rodríguez and Jean-Pierre Beltoise, whilst Ickx was jostled through the first chicane and dropped back. Stewart streaked ahead, setting fastest lap on lap 2 and pulling out a 10-second lead by lap 7. His only real challenger, Regazzoni, hit a patch of oil and sailed into the guardrail, breaking a wheel on lap 20. On lap 28 Rodríguez dropped out with a faulty coil, leaving the Tyrrells in 1–2 formation, with François Cevert proving his worth on his home ground. Hill dropped out of fifth place with a broken oil pipe, having previously hit the guardrail whilst avoiding Regazzoni.

This left Jo Siffert in third place, holding off Emerson Fittipaldi, who was in pain and heavily bandaged after a road accident. Despite this, the Brazilian took 3rd on lap 39. Siffert retook this briefly, but Fittipaldi held on for the final podium place from the Swiss. Chris Amon took 5th in an unconvincing performance by home team Matra, duelling with Tim Schenken until Schenken ran out of oil 6 laps from the end.

It was a 1–2 success for Tyrrell Racing on a circuit perceived to be difficult, the Cosworth DFV engine providing additional power down the Mistral straight.

This was to be Pedro Rodríguez's last Formula One race. He was killed a week later while driving a privately entered Ferrari 512 at an Interserie sports car race at the Norisring in Germany.

== Classification ==
=== Qualifying ===
Pos	No	Driver	Constructor	Time	Gap
1	11	(United Kingdom) Jackie Stewart	Tyrrell-Ford	1:50.71	—
2	5	(Switzerland) Clay Regazzoni	Ferrari	1:51.53	+0.82
3	4	(Belgium) Jacky Ickx	Ferrari	1:51.88	+1.17
4	7	(United Kingdom) Graham Hill	Brabham-Ford	1:52.32	+1.61
5	15	(Mexico) Pedro Rodríguez	BRM	1:52.46	+1.75
6	14	(Switzerland) Jo Siffert	BRM	1:52.50	+1.79
7	12	(France) François Cevert	Tyrrell-Ford	1:52.69	+1.98
8	21	(France) Jean-Pierre Beltoise	Matra	1:52.92	+2.21
9	20	(New Zealand) Chris Amon	Matra	1:52.94	+2.23
10	24	(Germany) Rolf Stommelen	Surtees-Ford	1:53.10	+2.39
11	9	(New Zealand) Denny Hulme	McLaren-Ford	1:53.24	+2.53
12	17	(Sweden) Ronnie Peterson	March-Alfa Romeo	1:53.36	+2.65
13	22	(United Kingdom) John Surtees	Surtees-Ford	1:53.57	+2.86
14	8	(Australia) Tim Schenken	Brabham-Ford	1:53.58	+2.87
15	2	(Sweden) Reine Wisell	Lotus-Ford	1:53.75	+3.04
16	16	(New Zealand) Howden Ganley	BRM	1:53.77	+3.06
17	1	(Brazil) Emerson Fittipaldi	Lotus-Ford	1:54.22	+3.51
18	27	(France) Henri Pescarolo	March-Ford	1:54.27	+3.56
19	10	(United Kingdom) Peter Gethin	McLaren-Ford	1:54.90	+4.19
20	33	(Italy) Nanni Galli	March-Ford	1:55.52	+4.81
21	19	(Italy) Andrea de Adamich	March-Alfa Romeo	1:56.17	+5.46
22	18	(Spain) Alex Soler-Roig	March-Ford	1:57.07	+6.36
23	28	(France) Max Jean	March-Ford	1:59.79	+9.08
24	34	(France) François Mazet	March-Ford	2:00.51	+9.80

=== Race ===
Pos	No	Driver	Constructor	Laps	Time/Retired	Grid	Points
1	11	(United Kingdom) Jackie Stewart	Tyrrell-Ford	55	1:46:42.3	1	9
2	12	(France) François Cevert	Tyrrell-Ford	55	+ 28.12	7	6
3	1	(Brazil) Emerson Fittipaldi	Lotus-Ford	55	+ 34.07	17	4
4	14	(Switzerland) Jo Siffert	BRM	55	+ 37.17	6	3
5	20	(New Zealand) Chris Amon	Matra	55	+ 41.08	9	2
6	2	(Sweden) Reine Wisell	Lotus-Ford	55	+ 1:16.02	15	1
7	21	(France) Jean-Pierre Beltoise	Matra	55	+ 1:16.93	8	
8	22	(United Kingdom) John Surtees	Surtees-Ford	55	+ 1:24.91	13	
9	10	(United Kingdom) Peter Gethin	McLaren-Ford	54	+ 1 Lap	19	
10	16	(New Zealand) Howden Ganley	BRM	54	+ 1 Lap	16	
11	24	(Germany) Rolf Stommelen	Surtees-Ford	53	+ 2 Laps	10	
12	8	(Australia) Tim Schenken	Brabham-Ford	50	Oil Pressure	14	
13	34	(France) François Mazet	March-Ford	50	+ 5 Laps	23	
NC	28	(France) Max Jean	March-Ford	46	+ 9 Laps	22	
Ret	27	(France) Henri Pescarolo	March-Ford	45	Gearbox	18	
Ret	7	(United Kingdom) Graham Hill	Brabham-Ford	34	Oil Pipe	4	
Ret	19	(Italy) Andrea de Adamich	March-Alfa Romeo	31	Engine	20	
Ret	15	(Mexico) Pedro Rodríguez	BRM	27	Ignition	5	
Ret	5	(Switzerland) Clay Regazzoni	Ferrari	20	Accident	2	
Ret	17	(Sweden) Ronnie Peterson	March-Alfa Romeo	19	Engine	12	
Ret	9	(New Zealand) Denny Hulme	McLaren-Ford	16	Ignition	11	
Ret	4	(Belgium) Jacky Ickx	Ferrari	4	Engine	3	
Ret	18	(Spain) Alex Soler-Roig	March-Ford	4	Fuel Pump	21	
DNS	33	(Italy) Nanni Galli	March-Ford		Engine		

== Notes ==
- This was the Formula One World Championship debut for French drivers Max Jean and François Mazet.
- This race saw the 25th Grand Slam set by a British driver.
- This race marked the 5th podium finish for British constructor Tyrrell.

== Championship standings after the race ==
Drivers' Championship standings

Pos	Driver	Points
1	(United Kingdom) Jackie Stewart	33
2	(Belgium) Jacky Ickx	19
3	(United States) Mario Andretti	9
4	(Mexico) Pedro Rodríguez	9
5	(Sweden) Ronnie Peterson	9

Constructors' Championship standings

	Pos	Constructor	Points
1	1	(United Kingdom) Tyrrell-Ford	33
1	2	(Italy) Ferrari	28
	3	(United Kingdom) BRM	12
	4	(United Kingdom) March-Ford	9
2	5	(United Kingdom) Lotus-Ford	9

- Note: Only the top five positions are included for both sets of standings.

Previous race: 1971 Dutch Grand Prix	FIA Formula One World Championship; 1971 season	Next race: 1971 British Grand Prix
Previous race: 1970 French Grand Prix	French Grand Prix	Next race: 1972 French Grand Prix
