= BRM Grand Prix results =

Motor racing team statistics

Formula One World Championship results for the BRM Formula One team and BRM cars entered by other teams.

== Complete Formula One World Championship results ==
=== Works team results ===
(key)

Year	Chassis	Engines	Tyres	Drivers	1	2	3	4	5	6	7	8	9	10	11	12	13	14	15	16	17	Points	WCC
1951	BRM 15	BRM P15 1.5 V16s	D		SUI	500	BEL	FRA	GBR	GER	ITA	ESP										—N/a (Note: The Constructors World Championship did not exist before 1958.)	
1951	BRM 15	BRM P15 1.5 V16s	D	(United Kingdom) Peter Walker					7													—N/a	
1951	BRM 15	BRM P15 1.5 V16s	D	(United Kingdom) Reg Parnell					5		DNS											—N/a	
1951	BRM 15	BRM P15 1.5 V16s	D	(United Kingdom) Ken Richardson							DNS											—N/a	
1951	BRM 15	BRM P15 1.5 V16s	D	(Germany) Hans Stuck							DNS											—N/a	
1952–1953: BRM did not compete.
1954	Maserati 250F	Maserati 250F1 2.5 L6	D		ARG	500	BEL	FRA	GBR	GER	SUI	ITA	ESP									—N/a (Note: Not entered as a Constructor.)	
1954	Maserati 250F	Maserati 250F1 2.5 L6	D	(United Kingdom) Ken Wharton				Ret	8	DNS	6		8									—N/a	
1955	Maserati 250F	Maserati 250F1 2.5 L6	D		ARG	MON	500	BEL	NED	GBR	ITA											—N/a	
1955	Maserati 250F	Maserati 250F1 2.5 L6	D	(United Kingdom) Peter Collins						Ret												—N/a	
1956	Maserati 250F	Maserati 250F1 2.5 L6	P		ARG	MON	500	BEL	FRA	GBR	GER	ITA										—N/a	
1956	Maserati 250F	Maserati 250F1 2.5 L6	P	(United Kingdom) Mike Hawthorn	3			DNS														—N/a	
1956	BRM P25	BRM P25 2.5 L4	D	(United Kingdom) Mike Hawthorn		DNS				Ret												—N/a	
1956	BRM P25	BRM P25 2.5 L4	D	(United Kingdom) Tony Brooks		DNS				Ret												—N/a	
1956	BRM P25	BRM P25 2.5 L4	D	(United Kingdom) Ron Flockhart						Ret												—N/a	
1957	BRM P25	BRM P25 2.5 L4	D		ARG	MON	500	FRA	GBR	GER	PES	ITA										—N/a	
1957	BRM P25	BRM P25 2.5 L4	D	(United Kingdom) Ron Flockhart		Ret		Ret														—N/a	
1957	BRM P25	BRM P25 2.5 L4	D	(United Kingdom) Roy Salvadori		DNQ																—N/a	
1957	BRM P25	BRM P25 2.5 L4	D	(United States) Herbert MacKay-Fraser				Ret														—N/a	
1957	BRM P25	BRM P25 2.5 L4	D	(United Kingdom) Jack Fairman					Ret													—N/a	
1957	BRM P25	BRM P25 2.5 L4	D	(United Kingdom) Les Leston					Ret													—N/a	
1958	BRM P25	BRM P25 2.5 L4	D		ARG	MON	NED	500	BEL	FRA	GBR	GER	POR	ITA	MOR							18	4th
1958	BRM P25	BRM P25 2.5 L4	D	(United States) Harry Schell		5	2		5	Ret	5	Ret	6	Ret	Ret							18	4th
1958	BRM P25	BRM P25 2.5 L4	D	(France) Jean Behra		Ret	3		Ret	Ret	Ret	Ret	4	Ret	Ret							18	4th
1958	BRM P25	BRM P25 2.5 L4	D	(France) Maurice Trintignant						Ret												18	4th
1958	BRM P25	BRM P25 2.5 L4	D	(Sweden) Joakim Bonnier										Ret	4							18	4th
1958	BRM P25	BRM P25 2.5 L4	D	(United Kingdom) Ron Flockhart											Ret							18	4th
1959	BRM P25	BRM P25 2.5 L4	D		MON	500	NED	FRA	GBR	GER	POR	ITA	USA									18 (Note: Includes points scored by non-works entries.)	3rd
1959	BRM P25	BRM P25 2.5 L4	D	(United States) Harry Schell	Ret		Ret	7	4	7	5	7										18	3rd
1959	BRM P25	BRM P25 2.5 L4	D	(United Kingdom) Ron Flockhart	Ret			6	Ret		7	13										18	3rd
1959	BRM P25	BRM P25 2.5 L4	D	(Sweden) Joakim Bonnier	Ret		1^{P}	Ret	Ret	5	Ret	8										18	3rd
1960	BRM P25; BRM P48	BRM P25 2.5 L4	D		ARG	MON	500	NED	BEL	FRA	GBR	POR	ITA	USA								8	4th
1960	BRM P25; BRM P48	BRM P25 2.5 L4	D	(United Kingdom) Graham Hill	Ret	7		3	Ret	Ret	Ret^{F}	Ret		Ret								8	4th
1960	BRM P25; BRM P48	BRM P25 2.5 L4	D	(Sweden) Joakim Bonnier	7	5		Ret	Ret	Ret	Ret	Ret		5								8	4th
1960	BRM P25; BRM P48	BRM P25 2.5 L4	D	(United States) Dan Gurney		NC		Ret	Ret	Ret	10	Ret		Ret								8	4th
1961	BRM P48/57	Climax FPF 1.5 L4	D		MON	NED	BEL	FRA	GBR	GER	ITA	USA										7	5th
1961	BRM P48/57	Climax FPF 1.5 L4	D	(United Kingdom) Graham Hill	Ret	8	Ret	6	Ret	Ret	Ret	5										7	5th
1961	BRM P48/57	Climax FPF 1.5 L4	D	(United Kingdom) Tony Brooks	13	9	13	Ret	9^{F}	NC	5	3										7	5th
1962	BRM P57; BRM P48/57	BRM P56 1.5 V8	D		NED	MON	BEL	FRA	GBR	GER	ITA	USA	RSA									42	1st
1962	BRM P57; BRM P48/57	BRM P56 1.5 V8	D	(United Kingdom) Graham Hill	1	6	2^{P}	9^{F}	4	1^{F}	1^{F}	2	1									42	1st
1962	BRM P57; BRM P48/57	BRM P56 1.5 V8	D	(United States) Richie Ginther	Ret	Ret	Ret	3	13	8	2	Ret	7									42	1st
1962	BRM P57; BRM P48/57	BRM P56 1.5 V8	D	(South Africa) Bruce Johnstone									9									42	1st
1963	BRM P57; BRM P61	BRM P56 1.5 V8	D		MON	BEL	NED	FRA	GBR	GER	ITA	USA	MEX	RSA								36	2nd
1963	BRM P57; BRM P61	BRM P56 1.5 V8	D	(United Kingdom) Graham Hill	1	Ret^{P}	Ret	3	3	Ret	16	1^{P}	4	3								36	2nd
1963	BRM P57; BRM P61	BRM P56 1.5 V8	D	(United States) Richie Ginther	2	4	5	Ret	4	3	2	2	3	Ret								36	2nd
1964	BRM P261; BRM P67	BRM P56 1.5 V8	D		MON	NED	BEL	FRA	GBR	GER	AUT	ITA	USA	MEX								42	2nd
1964	BRM P261; BRM P67	BRM P56 1.5 V8	D	(United Kingdom) Graham Hill	1^{F}	4	5	2	2	2	Ret^{P}	Ret	1	11								42	2nd
1964	BRM P261; BRM P67	BRM P56 1.5 V8	D	(United States) Richie Ginther	2	11	4	5	8	7	2	4	4	8								42	2nd
1964	BRM P261; BRM P67	BRM P56 1.5 V8	D	(United Kingdom) Richard Attwood					DNS													42	2nd
1965	BRM P261	BRM P56 1.5 V8	D		RSA	MON	BEL	FRA	GBR	NED	GER	ITA	USA	MEX								45	2nd
1965	BRM P261	BRM P56 1.5 V8	D	(United Kingdom) Graham Hill	3	1^{P}^{F}	5^{P}	5	2^{F}	4^{P}	2	2	1^{P}^{F}	Ret								45	2nd
1965	BRM P261	BRM P56 1.5 V8	D	(United Kingdom) Jackie Stewart	6	3	2	2	5	2	Ret	1	Ret	Ret								45	2nd
1966	BRM P261; BRM P83	BRM P75 3.0 H16; BRM P60 2.0 V8	D		MON	BEL	FRA	GBR	NED	GER	ITA	USA	MEX									22	4th
1966	BRM P261; BRM P83	BRM P75 3.0 H16; BRM P60 2.0 V8	D	(United Kingdom) Graham Hill	3	Ret	Ret	3	2	4	Ret	Ret	Ret									22	4th
1966	BRM P261; BRM P83	BRM P75 3.0 H16; BRM P60 2.0 V8	D	(United Kingdom) Jackie Stewart	1	Ret		Ret	4	5	Ret	Ret	Ret									22	4th
1967	BRM P261; BRM P83; BRM P115	BRM P75 3.0 H16; BRM P60 2.1 V8	G		RSA	MON	NED	BEL	FRA	GBR	GER	CAN	ITA	USA	MEX							17	6th
1967	BRM P261; BRM P83; BRM P115	BRM P75 3.0 H16; BRM P60 2.1 V8	G	(United Kingdom) Jackie Stewart	Ret	Ret	Ret	2	3	Ret	Ret	Ret	Ret	Ret	Ret							17	6th
1967	BRM P261; BRM P83; BRM P115	BRM P75 3.0 H16; BRM P60 2.1 V8	G	(United Kingdom) Mike Spence	Ret	6	8	5	Ret	Ret	Ret	5	5	Ret	5							17	6th
1968	BRM P126; BRM P115; BRM P133; BRM P138	BRM P101 3.0 V12; BRM P75 3.0 H16	G		RSA	ESP	MON	BEL	NED	FRA	GBR	GER	ITA	CAN	USA	MEX						28	5th
1968	BRM P126; BRM P115; BRM P133; BRM P138	BRM P101 3.0 V12; BRM P75 3.0 H16	G	(Mexico) Pedro Rodríguez	Ret	Ret	Ret	2	3	NC^{F}	Ret	6	Ret	3	Ret	4						28	5th
1968	BRM P126; BRM P115; BRM P133; BRM P138	BRM P101 3.0 V12; BRM P75 3.0 H16	G	(United Kingdom) Mike Spence	Ret																	28	5th
1968	BRM P126; BRM P115; BRM P133; BRM P138	BRM P101 3.0 V12; BRM P75 3.0 H16	G	(United Kingdom) Richard Attwood			2^{F}	Ret	7	7	Ret	14										28	5th
1968	BRM P126; BRM P115; BRM P133; BRM P138	BRM P101 3.0 V12; BRM P75 3.0 H16	G	(United States) Bobby Unser									DNS		Ret							28	5th
1969	BRM P138; BRM P133; BRM P139	BRM P101 3.0 V12; BRM P142 3.0 V12	D		RSA	ESP	MON	NED	FRA	GBR	GER	ITA	CAN	USA	MEX							7	6th
1969	BRM P138; BRM P133; BRM P139	BRM P101 3.0 V12; BRM P142 3.0 V12	D	(United Kingdom) Jackie Oliver	7	Ret	Ret	Ret		Ret	Ret	Ret	Ret	Ret	6							7	6th
1969	BRM P138; BRM P133; BRM P139	BRM P101 3.0 V12; BRM P142 3.0 V12	D	(United Kingdom) John Surtees	Ret	5	Ret	9		Ret	DNS	NC	Ret	3	Ret							7	6th
1969	BRM P138; BRM P133; BRM P139	BRM P101 3.0 V12; BRM P142 3.0 V12	D	(Canada) Bill Brack									NC									7	6th
1969	BRM P138; BRM P133; BRM P139	BRM P101 3.0 V12; BRM P142 3.0 V12	D	(Canada) George Eaton										Ret	Ret							7	6th
1970	BRM P153; BRM P139	BRM P142 3.0 V12	D		RSA	ESP	MON	BEL	NED	FRA	GBR	GER	AUT	ITA	CAN	USA	MEX					23	7th
1970	BRM P153; BRM P139	BRM P142 3.0 V12	D	(Mexico) Pedro Rodríguez	9	Ret	6	1	10	Ret	Ret	Ret	4	Ret	4	2	6					23	7th
1970	BRM P153; BRM P139	BRM P142 3.0 V12	D	(United Kingdom) Jackie Oliver	Ret	Ret	Ret	Ret	Ret	Ret	Ret	Ret	5	Ret	NC	Ret	7					23	7th
1970	BRM P153; BRM P139	BRM P142 3.0 V12	D	(Canada) George Eaton	Ret	DNQ	DNQ		Ret	12	Ret		11	Ret	10	Ret						23	7th
1970	BRM P153; BRM P139	BRM P142 3.0 V12	D	(United Kingdom) Peter Westbury												DNQ						23	7th
1971	BRM P153; BRM P160	BRM P142 3.0 V12	F		RSA	ESP	MON	NED	FRA	GBR	GER	AUT	ITA	CAN	USA							36	2nd
1971	BRM P153; BRM P160	BRM P142 3.0 V12	F	(Switzerland) Jo Siffert	Ret	Ret	Ret	6	4	9	DSQ	1^{P}^{F}	9	9	2							36	2nd
1971	BRM P153; BRM P160	BRM P142 3.0 V12	F	(New Zealand) Howden Ganley	Ret	10	DNQ	7	10	8	Ret	Ret	5	DNS	4							36	2nd
1971	BRM P153; BRM P160	BRM P142 3.0 V12	F	(Mexico) Pedro Rodríguez	Ret	4	9	2	Ret													36	2nd
1971	BRM P153; BRM P160	BRM P142 3.0 V12	F	(United Kingdom) Vic Elford							11											36	2nd
1971	BRM P153; BRM P160	BRM P142 3.0 V12	F	(United Kingdom) Peter Gethin								10	1	14	9							36	2nd
1971	BRM P153; BRM P160	BRM P142 3.0 V12	F	(Austria) Helmut Marko								11	Ret	12	13							36	2nd
1971	BRM P153; BRM P160	BRM P142 3.0 V12	F	(Canada) George Eaton										15								36	2nd
1971	BRM P153; BRM P160	BRM P142 3.0 V12	F	(Canada) John Cannon											14								
1972	BRM P160B; BRM P153; BRM P180; BRM P160C	BRM P142 3.0 V12	F		ARG	RSA	ESP	MON	BEL	FRA	GBR	GER	AUT	ITA	CAN	USA						14	7th
1972	BRM P160B; BRM P153; BRM P180; BRM P160C	BRM P142 3.0 V12	F	(Sweden) Reine Wisell	Ret		Ret	Ret		Ret		Ret		12								14	7th
1972	BRM P160B; BRM P153; BRM P180; BRM P160C	BRM P142 3.0 V12	F	(New Zealand) Howden Ganley	9	NC	Ret	Ret	8	DNS		4	6	11	10	Ret						14	7th
1972	BRM P160B; BRM P153; BRM P180; BRM P160C	BRM P142 3.0 V12	F	(Austria) Helmut Marko	10	14		8	10	Ret												14	7th
1972	BRM P160B; BRM P153; BRM P180; BRM P160C	BRM P142 3.0 V12	F	(United Kingdom) Peter Gethin	Ret	NC	Ret	Ret	Ret	DNS	Ret		13	6	Ret	Ret						14	7th
1972	BRM P160B; BRM P153; BRM P180; BRM P160C	BRM P142 3.0 V12	F	(Spain) Alex Soler-Roig	Ret		Ret															14	7th
1972	BRM P160B; BRM P153; BRM P180; BRM P160C	BRM P142 3.0 V12	F	(France) Jean-Pierre Beltoise		Ret	Ret	1^{F}	Ret	15	11	9	8	8	Ret	Ret						14	7th
1972	BRM P160B; BRM P153; BRM P180; BRM P160C	BRM P142 3.0 V12	F	(Australia) Vern Schuppan					DNS													14	7th
1972	BRM P160B; BRM P153; BRM P180; BRM P160C	BRM P142 3.0 V12	F	(United Kingdom) Jackie Oliver							Ret											14	7th
1972	BRM P160B; BRM P153; BRM P180; BRM P160C	BRM P142 3.0 V12	F	(Canada) Bill Brack											Ret							14	7th
1972	BRM P160B; BRM P153; BRM P180; BRM P160C	BRM P142 3.0 V12	F	(United Kingdom) Brian Redman												Ret						14	7th
1973	BRM P160C; BRM P160D	BRM P142 3.0 V12	F		ARG	BRA	RSA	ESP	BEL	MON	SWE	FRA	GBR	NED	GER	AUT	ITA	CAN	USA			12	7th
1973	BRM P160C; BRM P160D	BRM P142 3.0 V12	F	(Switzerland) Clay Regazzoni	7^{P}	6	Ret	9	10	Ret	9	12	7	8	Ret	6	Ret		8			12	7th
1973	BRM P160C; BRM P160D	BRM P142 3.0 V12	F	(Austria) Niki Lauda	Ret	8	Ret	Ret	5	Ret	13	9	12	Ret	Ret	DNS	Ret	Ret	Ret			12	7th
1973	BRM P160C; BRM P160D	BRM P142 3.0 V12	F	(France) Jean-Pierre Beltoise	Ret	Ret	Ret	5	Ret	Ret	Ret	11	Ret	5	Ret	5	13	4	9			12	7th
1973	BRM P160C; BRM P160D	BRM P142 3.0 V12	F	(United Kingdom) Peter Gethin														Ret				12	7th
1974	BRM P160E; BRM P201	BRM P142 3.0 V12	F		ARG	BRA	RSA	ESP	BEL	MON	SWE	NED	FRA	GBR	GER	AUT	ITA	CAN	USA			10	7th
1974	BRM P160E; BRM P201	BRM P142 3.0 V12	F	(France) Jean-Pierre Beltoise	5	10	2	Ret	5	Ret	Ret	Ret	10	12	Ret	Ret	Ret	NC	DNQ			10	7th
1974	BRM P160E; BRM P201	BRM P142 3.0 V12	F	(France) François Migault	Ret	16	15	Ret	16	Ret		Ret	14	NC	DNQ		Ret					10	7th
1974	BRM P160E; BRM P201	BRM P142 3.0 V12	F	(France) Henri Pescarolo	9	14	18	12	Ret	Ret	Ret	Ret	Ret	Ret	10		Ret					10	7th
1974	BRM P160E; BRM P201	BRM P142 3.0 V12	F	(New Zealand) Chris Amon														NC	9			10	7th
1975	BRM P201	BRM P200 3.0 V12	G		ARG	BRA	RSA	ESP	MON	BEL	SWE	NED	FRA	GBR	GER	AUT	ITA	USA				0	NC
1975	BRM P201	BRM P200 3.0 V12	G	(United Kingdom) Mike Wilds	Ret	Ret																0	NC
1975	BRM P201	BRM P200 3.0 V12	G	(United Kingdom) Bob Evans			15	Ret	DNQ	9	13	Ret	17			Ret	Ret					0	NC
1976	BRM P201B	BRM P200 3.0 V12	G		BRA	RSA	USW	ESP	BEL	MON	SWE	NED	FRA	GBR	GER	AUT	ITA	CAN	USA	JPN		0	NC
1976	BRM P201B	BRM P200 3.0 V12	G	(United Kingdom) Ian Ashley	Ret																	0	NC
1977	BRM P207; BRM P201B	BRM P202 3.0 V12; BRM P200 3.0 V12	G		ARG	BRA	RSA	USW	ESP	MON	BEL	SWE	FRA	GBR	GER	AUT	NED	ITA	USA	CAN	JPN	0	NC
1977	BRM P207; BRM P201B	BRM P202 3.0 V12; BRM P200 3.0 V12	G	(Australia) Larry Perkins		Ret	15															0	NC
1977	BRM P207; BRM P201B	BRM P202 3.0 V12; BRM P200 3.0 V12	G	(Sweden) Conny Andersson					DNQ		DNQ	DNQ	DNQ									0	NC
1977	BRM P207; BRM P201B	BRM P202 3.0 V12; BRM P200 3.0 V12	G	(United Kingdom) Guy Edwards										DNPQ								0	NC
1977	BRM P207; BRM P201B	BRM P202 3.0 V12; BRM P200 3.0 V12	G	(Belgium) Teddy Pilette											DNQ		DNQ	DNQ				0	NC

=== Other BRM cars ===
(key)

Year	Entrant	Chassis	Engine	Tyres	Driver	1	2	3	4	5	6	7	8	9	10	11	12
1959						MON	500	NED	FRA	GBR	GER	POR	ITA	USA			
1959	British Racing Partnership	P25	BRM P25 2.5 L4	D	(United Kingdom) Stirling Moss				DSQ^{F}	2^{F}							
1959	British Racing Partnership	P25	BRM P25 2.5 L4	D	(Germany) Hans Herrmann						Ret						
1962						NED	MON	BEL	FRA	GBR	GER	ITA	USA	RSA			
1962	Ecurie Galloise	P48/57	BRM P56 1.5 V8	D	(United Kingdom) Jackie Lewis		DNQ										
1963						MON	BEL	NED	FRA	GBR	GER	ITA	USA	MEX	RSA		
1963	Scuderia Centro Sud	P57	BRM P56 1.5 V8	D	(Italy) Lorenzo Bandini				10	5	Ret						
1963	Scuderia Centro Sud	P57	BRM P56 1.5 V8	D	(France) Maurice Trintignant							9					
1963	Scuderia Centro Sud	P57	BRM P56 1.5 V8	D	(Mexico) Moisés Solana									11			
1964						MON	NED	BEL	FRA	GBR	GER	AUT	ITA	USA	MEX		
1964	Maurice Trintignant	P57	BRM P56 1.5 V8	D	(France) Maurice Trintignant	Ret			11	DNQ	5		Ret				
1964	Scuderia Centro Sud	P57	BRM P56 1.5 V8	D	(Italy) Giancarlo Baghetti		10	8		12	Ret	7	8				
1964	Scuderia Centro Sud	P57	BRM P56 1.5 V8	D	(South Africa) Tony Maggs		DNS	DNS		Ret	6	4					
1965						RSA	MON	BEL	FRA	GBR	NED	GER	ITA	USA	MEX		
1965	Scuderia Centro Sud	P57	BRM P56 1.5 V8	D	(Belgium) Lucien Bianchi			12									
1965	Scuderia Centro Sud	P57	BRM P56 1.5 V8	D	(Belgium) Willy Mairesse			DNS									
1965	Scuderia Centro Sud	P57	BRM P56 1.5 V8	D	(United States) Masten Gregory			Ret		12		8	Ret				
1965	Scuderia Centro Sud	P57	BRM P56 1.5 V8	D	(Italy) Roberto Bussinello							DNQ	13				
1965	Scuderia Centro Sud	P57	BRM P56 1.5 V8	D	(Italy) Giorgio Bassi								Ret				
1966						MON	BEL	FRA	GBR	NED	GER	ITA	USA	MEX			
1966	Team Chamaco Collect	P261	BRM P60 2.0 V8	D	(United States) Bob Bondurant	4	Ret		9		Ret	7					
1966	Team Chamaco Collect	P261	BRM P60 2.0 V8	D	(United Kingdom) Vic Wilson		DNS										
1966	Bernard White Racing	P261	BRM P60 1.9 V8	D	(United Kingdom) Innes Ireland								Ret	Ret			
1967						RSA	MON	NED	BEL	FRA	GBR	GER	CAN	ITA	USA	MEX	
1967	Reg Parnell Racing	P261; P83	BRM P60 2.1 V8; BRM P75 3.0 H16	F	(United Kingdom) Piers Courage		Ret				DNS						
1967	Reg Parnell Racing	P261; P83	BRM P60 2.1 V8; BRM P75 3.0 H16	F	(United Kingdom) Chris Irwin				Ret	5	7	9	Ret	Ret	Ret	Ret	
1967	Bernard White Racing	P261	BRM P60 2.1 V8	G	(United Kingdom) David Hobbs						8		9				
1968						RSA	ESP	MON	BEL	NED	FRA	GBR	GER	ITA	CAN	USA	MEX
1968	Reg Parnell Racing	P126	BRM P101 3.0 V12	G	(United Kingdom) Piers Courage		Ret	Ret	Ret	Ret	6	8	8	4	Ret	Ret	Ret
1968	Bernard White Racing	P261	BRM P101 3.0 V12	G	(Australia) Frank Gardner									DNQ			
1969						RSA	ESP	MON	NED	FRA	GBR	GER	ITA	CAN	USA	MEX	
1969	Reg Parnell Racing	P126	BRM P101 3.0 V12	G	(Mexico) Pedro Rodríguez	Ret	Ret	Ret									

=== As an engine supplier ===
(key)

Year	Entrant	Chassis	Engine	Tyres	Drivers	1	2	3	4	5	6	7	8	9	10	11	12	WCC	Pts
1962	UDT Laystall Racing Team	Lotus 24	BRM P56 1.5 V8	D		NED	MON	BEL	FRA	GBR	GER	ITA	USA	RSA				8th	1
1962	UDT Laystall Racing Team	Lotus 24	BRM P56 1.5 V8	D	(United States) Masten Gregory		DNQ	Ret	Ret			12	6					8th	1
1962	Autosport Team Wolfgang Seidel	Lotus 24	BRM P56 1.5 V8	D	(United States) Dan Gurney			DNS										8th	1
1962	Autosport Team Wolfgang Seidel	Lotus 24	BRM P56 1.5 V8	D	(Germany) Wolfgang Seidel					Ret	DNQ							8th	1
1962	Autosport Team Wolfgang Seidel	Lotus 24	BRM P56 1.5 V8	D	(Germany) Günther Seiffert						DNQ							8th	1
1962	Autosport Team Wolfgang Seidel	Lotus 24	BRM P56 1.5 V8	D	(New Zealand) Tony Shelly							DNQ						8th	1
1962	Ecurie Filipinetti	Lotus 24	BRM P56 1.5 V8	D	(Switzerland) Jo Siffert				Ret			DNQ						8th	1
1962	Ecurie Filipinetti	Lotus 24	BRM P56 1.5 V8	D	(Switzerland) Heinz Schiller						Ret							8th	1
1962	Gilby Engineering	Gilby 62	BRM P56 1.5 V8	D	(United Kingdom) Keith Greene						Ret	DNQ						NC	0
1963	British Racing Partnership	Lotus 24	BRM P56 1.5 V8	D		MON	BEL	NED	FRA	GBR	GER	ITA	USA	MEX	RSA			8th	4
1963	British Racing Partnership	Lotus 24	BRM P56 1.5 V8	D	(United States) Jim Hall	Ret	Ret	8	11	6	5	8	10	8				8th	4
1963	British Racing Partnership	Lotus 24	BRM P56 1.5 V8	D	(United Kingdom) Innes Ireland	Ret					Ret							8th	4
1963	Siffert Racing Team	Lotus 24	BRM P56 1.5 V8	D	(Switzerland) Jo Siffert	Ret	Ret	7	6	Ret	9	Ret	Ret	9				8th	4
1963	Ecurie Filipinetti	Lotus 24	BRM P56 1.5 V8	D	(United States) Phil Hill				NC									8th	4
1963	Tim Parnell	Lotus 24	BRM P56 1.5 V8	D	(United States) Masten Gregory				Ret			Ret						8th	4
1963	Reg Parnell Racing	Lotus 24	BRM P56 1.5 V8	D	(United States) Masten Gregory					11								8th	4
1963	Reg Parnell Racing	Lotus 24	BRM P56 1.5 V8	D	(United States) Rodger Ward								Ret					8th	4
1963	Reg Parnell Racing	Lotus 24	BRM P56 1.5 V8	D	(United States) Hap Sharp								Ret	7				8th	4
1963	Reg Parnell Racing	Lotus 24	BRM P56 1.5 V8	D	(New Zealand) Chris Amon									Ret				8th	4
1963	Selby Auto Spares	Lotus 24	BRM P56 1.5 V8	D	(South Africa) Paddy Driver										DNS			8th	4
1963	British Racing Partnership	BRP Mk 1	BRM P56 1.5 V8	D	(United Kingdom) Innes Ireland		Ret	4	9	Ret		4						6th	6
1963	Scirocco Powell Racing Cars	Scirocco SP	BRM P56 1.5 V8	D	(United States) Tony Settember		Ret		Ret	Ret	Ret	DNQ						NC	0
1963	Scirocco Powell Racing Cars	Scirocco SP	BRM P56 1.5 V8	D	(United Kingdom) Ian Burgess					Ret	Ret							NC	0
1963	Ian Raby Racing	Gilby 62	BRM P56 1.5 V8	D	(United Kingdom) Ian Raby					Ret	DNQ	DNQ						NC	0
1964	Reg Parnell Racing	Lotus 24; Lotus 25	BRM P56 1.5 V8	D		MON	NED	BEL	FRA	GBR	GER	AUT	ITA	USA	MEX			8th	3
1964	Reg Parnell Racing	Lotus 24; Lotus 25	BRM P56 1.5 V8	D	(New Zealand) Chris Amon	DNQ	5	Ret	10	Ret	11			Ret	Ret			8th	3
1964	Reg Parnell Racing	Lotus 24; Lotus 25	BRM P56 1.5 V8	D	(United Kingdom) Mike Hailwood	6	12		8	Ret	Ret	8	Ret	8	Ret			8th	3
1964	Reg Parnell Racing	Lotus 24; Lotus 25	BRM P56 1.5 V8	D	(United States) Peter Revson			DSQ	DNS	Ret								8th	3
1964	Revson Racing	Lotus 24	BRM P56 1.5 V8	D	(United States) Peter Revson	DNQ					14		13					8th	3
1964	British Racing Partnership	Lotus 24	BRM P56 1.5 V8	D	(United Kingdom) Innes Ireland	DNS												8th	3
1964	British Racing Partnership	Lotus 24	BRM P56 1.5 V8	D	(United Kingdom) Trevor Taylor					Ret								8th	3
1964	Siffert Racing Team	Lotus 24	BRM P56 1.5 V8	D	(Switzerland) Jo Siffert	8												8th	3
1964	British Racing Partnership	BRP Mk 1 BRP Mk 2	BRM P56 1.5 V8	D	(United Kingdom) Trevor Taylor	Ret		7	Ret			Ret	DNQ	6	Ret			7th	5
1964	British Racing Partnership	BRP Mk 1 BRP Mk 2	BRM P56 1.5 V8	D	(United Kingdom) Innes Ireland			10	Ret	10		5	5	Ret	12			7th	5
1964	Siffert Racing Team	Brabham BT11	BRM P56 1.5 V8	D	(Switzerland) Jo Siffert		13	Ret	Ret	11	4	Ret	7					6th	7
1964	R.R.C. Walker Racing Team	Brabham BT11	BRM P56 1.5 V8	D	(Sweden) Joakim Bonnier		9	Ret		Ret	Ret							6th	7
1964	R.R.C. Walker Racing Team	Brabham BT11	BRM P56 1.5 V8	D	(Austria) Jochen Rindt							Ret						6th	7
1964	R.R.C. Walker Racing Team	Brabham BT11	BRM P56 1.5 V8	D	(Italy) Geki								DNQ					6th	7
1964	R.R.C. Walker Racing Team	Brabham BT11	BRM P56 1.5 V8	D	(Switzerland) Jo Siffert									3	Ret			6th	7
1964	R.R.C. Walker Racing Team	Brabham BT11	BRM P56 1.5 V8	D	(United States) Hap Sharp									NC	13			6th	7
1964	Ian Raby Racing	Brabham BT3	BRM P56 1.5 V8	D	(United Kingdom) Ian Raby					Ret			DNQ					6th	7
1965	R.R.C. Walker Racing Team	Brabham BT11	BRM P56 1.5 V8	D		RSA	MON	BEL	FRA	GBR	NED	GER	ITA	USA	MEX			7th	5
1965	R.R.C. Walker Racing Team	Brabham BT11	BRM P56 1.5 V8	D	(Switzerland) Jo Siffert	7	6	8	6	9	13	Ret	Ret	11	4			7th	5
1965	John Willment Automobiles	Brabham BT11	BRM P56 1.5 V8	D	(Australia) Frank Gardner	12	Ret	Ret		8	11	Ret	Ret					7th	5
1965	Ian Raby Racing	Brabham BT3	BRM P56 1.5 V8	D	(United Kingdom) Ian Raby					11		DNQ						7th	5
1965	Ian Raby Racing	Brabham BT3	BRM P56 1.5 V8	D	(New Zealand) Chris Amon					DNS								7th	5
1965	Reg Parnell Racing	Lotus 25; Lotus 33	BRM P56 1.5 V8	D	(South Africa) Tony Maggs	11												8th	2
1965	Reg Parnell Racing	Lotus 25; Lotus 33	BRM P56 1.5 V8	D	(United Kingdom) Richard Attwood		Ret	14		13	12	Ret	6	10	6			8th	2
1965	Reg Parnell Racing	Lotus 25; Lotus 33	BRM P56 1.5 V8	D	(United Kingdom) Mike Hailwood		Ret											8th	2
1965	Reg Parnell Racing	Lotus 25; Lotus 33	BRM P56 1.5 V8	D	(United Kingdom) Innes Ireland			13	Ret	Ret	10		9	Ret	DNS			8th	2
1965	Reg Parnell Racing	Lotus 25; Lotus 33	BRM P56 1.5 V8	D	(New Zealand) Chris Amon				Ret			Ret						8th	2
1965	Reg Parnell Racing	Lotus 25; Lotus 33	BRM P56 1.5 V8	D	(United States) Bob Bondurant										Ret			8th	2
1966	Reg Parnell Racing	Lotus 33	BRM P60 2.0 V8	F		MON	BEL	FRA	GBR	NED	GER	ITA	USA	MEX				5th	13
1966	Reg Parnell Racing	Lotus 33	BRM P60 2.0 V8	F	(United Kingdom) Mike Spence	Ret	Ret	Ret	Ret	5	Ret	5	Ret	DNS				5th	13
1966	Team Lotus	Lotus 33; Lotus 43	BRM P75 3.0 H16; BRM P60 2.0 V8	F	(United Kingdom) Peter Arundell		DNS	Ret	Ret	Ret	12	8		7				5th	13
1966	Team Lotus	Lotus 33; Lotus 43	BRM P75 3.0 H16; BRM P60 2.0 V8	F	(United Kingdom) Jim Clark							Ret	1	Ret				5th	13
1966	Team Lotus	Lotus 33; Lotus 43	BRM P75 3.0 H16; BRM P60 2.0 V8	F	(Mexico) Pedro Rodríguez								Ret					5th	13
1966	R.R.C. Walker Racing Team	Brabham BT11	BRM P60 2.0 V8	D	(Switzerland) Jo Siffert	Ret												11th	1
1966	David Bridges	Brabham BT11	BRM P60 2.0 V8	G	(United Kingdom) John Taylor			6	8	8	Ret							11th	1
1966	Chris Amon Racing	Brabham BT11	BRM P60 1.9 V8	D	(New Zealand) Chris Amon							DNQ						11th	1
1966	Tyrrell Racing Organisation	Matra MS5	BRM 1.0 L4	D	(Germany) Hubert Hahne						9							—N/a (Note: Formula Two entry, ineligible for Championship points.)	
1967	Team Lotus	Lotus 43; Lotus 33	BRM P75 3.0 H16; BRM P60 2.1 V8	F		RSA	MON	NED	BEL	FRA	GBR	GER	CAN	ITA	USA	MEX		8th	6
1967	Team Lotus	Lotus 43; Lotus 33	BRM P75 3.0 H16; BRM P60 2.1 V8	F	(United Kingdom) Graham Hill	Ret	2											8th	6
1967	Team Lotus	Lotus 43; Lotus 33	BRM P75 3.0 H16; BRM P60 2.1 V8	F	(United Kingdom) Jim Clark	Ret												8th	6
1967	Reg Parnell Racing	Lotus 25	BRM P60 2.1 V8	F	(United Kingdom) Piers Courage	Ret												8th	6
1967	Reg Parnell Racing	Lotus 25	BRM P60 2.1 V8	F	(United Kingdom) Chris Irwin			7										8th	6
1967	Mike Fisher	Lotus 33	BRM P60 2.1 V8	F	(United States) Mike Fisher								11			Ret		8th	6
1967	Bruce McLaren Motor Racing	McLaren M4B	BRM P111 2.1 V8	G	(New Zealand) Bruce McLaren		4	Ret										10th	3
1967	Bruce McLaren Motor Racing	McLaren M5A	BRM P101 3.0 V12	G	(New Zealand) Bruce McLaren								7	Ret	Ret	Ret		10th	3
1968	Bruce McLaren Motor Racing	McLaren M5A	BRM P101 3.0 V12	G		RSA	ESP	MON	BEL	NED	FRA	GBR	GER	ITA	CAN	USA	MEX	10th	3
1968	Bruce McLaren Motor Racing	McLaren M5A	BRM P101 3.0 V12	G	(New Zealand) Denny Hulme	5												10th	3
1968	Joakim Bonnier Racing Team	McLaren M5A	BRM P101 3.0 V12	G	(Sweden) Joakim Bonnier			DNQ	Ret	8		Ret		6	Ret	NC	DNS	10th	3
1968	Cooper Car Company	Cooper T86B	BRM P101 3.0 V12	F	(United Kingdom) Brian Redman		3		Ret									7th	14
1968	Cooper Car Company	Cooper T86B	BRM P101 3.0 V12	F	(Italy) Ludovico Scarfiotti		4	4										7th	14
1968	Cooper Car Company	Cooper T86B	BRM P101 3.0 V12	F	(Belgium) Lucien Bianchi			3	6	Ret			Ret		NC	NC	Ret	7th	14
1968	Cooper Car Company	Cooper T86B	BRM P101 3.0 V12	F	(United Kingdom) Vic Elford						4	Ret	Ret	Ret	5	Ret	8	7th	14
1968	Cooper Car Company	Cooper T86B	BRM P101 3.0 V12	F	(France) Johnny Servoz-Gavin						Ret							7th	14
1968	Cooper Car Company	Cooper T86B	BRM P101 3.0 V12	F	(United Kingdom) Robin Widdows							Ret						7th	14
