= BRM V12 engine =

Overview
- Manufacturer: BRM
- Production: 1967–1977

Layout
- Configuration: 60° V-12
- Displacement: 3.0 L (183 cu in)
- Cylinder bore: 74.6 mm (2.9 in)
- Piston stroke: 57.2 mm (2.3 in)
- Cylinder block material: Aluminum
- Cylinder head material: Aluminum
- Valvetrain: 48-valve, DOHC, four-valves per cylinder
- Compression ratio: 11.0:1–11.5:1

Combustion
- Fuel system: Lucas fuel injection
- Fuel type: Gasoline
- Oil system: Dry sump

Output
- Power output: 350–490 hp (261–365 kW)
- Torque output: 250 lb⋅ft (339 N⋅m)

Dimensions
- Dry weight: 136–190 kg (299.8–418.9 lb)

The BRM V12 engine is a V12 Formula One racing engine, designed, developed and built by British manufacturer and constructor BRM, between 1967 and 1977.

== Background ==
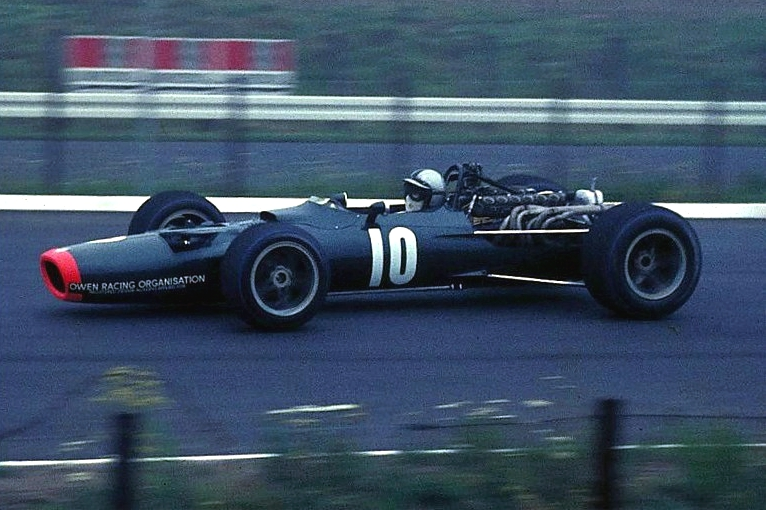
Pedro Rodríguez with BRM 1968

The H16 was replaced by a V12 (2.9375 x 2.25 in, 74.61 x 57.15 mm) designed by Geoff Johnson. It had been intended for sports car use, but was first used in F1 by the McLaren M5A. Back at the works, the early V12 years were lean ones. In 1967 the two-valve layout gave about 360 bhp (270 kW) at 9,000 rpm. In 1968 this had increased to 390 bhp (290 kW) at 9,750 rpm. Geoff Johnson updated the design by adding a four-valve head, based on the H16 485 bhp 4-valve layout; this improved the V12's power output to 452 bhp (337 kW) at 10,500 rpm and eventually to a claimed 465 bhp (347 kW) during 1969. In 1973, Louis Stanley claimed 490 bhp (370 kW) at 11,750 rpm. The design and building of the first V-12 chassis, the P126 was contracted to former Lotus and Eagle designer Len Terry's Transatlantic Automotive Consultants. The cars first appeared during the 1968 Tasman Championship, powered by 2.5 litre versions of the engine, temporary team driver Bruce McLaren winning the fourth round of the series at Teretonga but being generally unimpressed with the car. BRM themselves built further examples of the Terry design, which were designated P133 and 1968 team drivers Mike Spence and Pedro Rodríguez appeared competitive in early season non championship races at Brands Hatch and Silverstone, but then Spence was killed driving the Lotus 56 turbine during qualifying at Indianapolis. Spence's replacement, Richard Attwood, finished a good second to Graham Hill's Lotus at Monaco, but after this results went downhill and the season petered out ignominiously. For 1969 the four valve per cylinder engine was developed and a new slimline car, the P139 was built. John Surtees joined as the team's lead driver backed up by Jack Oliver. Rodríguez was shunted into the semi-works Parnell team. Surtees' time at BRM was not a happy one and, despite the fact that a ground effect "wing car" was designed, this was never constructed and the team's performances were lacklustre. Surtees left after a single season (1969), along with Tony Rudd who went to Lotus (initially on the road-car side), and Geoff Johnson who departed for Austin Morris.

The team regrouped with Tony Southgate as designer and Rodríguez brought back into the fold to partner Oliver, and gained its first V12 victory when Rodríguez won the 1970 Belgian Grand Prix in a P153, with further victories for Jo Siffert and Peter Gethin in 1971 in the P160. The team had reached one of its intermittent peaks of success. Both Siffert and Rodríguez were killed before the 1972 season and the team had to regroup completely again. Their last World Championship victory came when Jean-Pierre Beltoise drove a stunning race to win the rain-affected 1972 Monaco Grand Prix with the P160. He also won the non-championship 1972 World Championship Victory Race later in the year. The 1972 campaign was generally chaotic: having acquired major sponsorship, Louis Stanley originally planned to field up to six cars (three for established drivers, three for paying journeymen and young drivers) of varying designs including P153s, P160s and P180s and actually ran up to five for a mix of paying and paid drivers until it became obvious that it was completely overstretched and the team's sponsors insisted that the team should cut back to a more reasonable level and only three cars were run in 1973 for Beltoise, Lauda, and Regazzoni.

== Formula One World Championship results ==
(key) (Results in bold indicate pole position; results in italics indicate fastest lap)

Year	Entrant	Chassis	Engine(s)	Tyres	Drivers	1	2	3	4	5	6	7	8	9	10	11	12	13	14	15	16	17	WDC	Points
1967	Bruce McLaren Motor Racing	McLaren M5A	BRM P101 3.0 V12	G		RSA	MON	NED	BEL	FRA	GBR	GER	CAN	ITA	USA	MEX							10th	**3**
1967	Bruce McLaren Motor Racing	McLaren M5A	BRM P101 3.0 V12	G	(New Zealand) Bruce McLaren								7	Ret	Ret	Ret							10th	**3**
1968	Owen Racing Organisation	BRM P126; BRM P133; BRM P138	BRM P101 3.0 V12	G		RSA	ESP	MON	BEL	NED	FRA	GBR	GER	ITA	CAN	USA	MEX						28	**5th**
1968	Owen Racing Organisation	BRM P126; BRM P133; BRM P138	BRM P101 3.0 V12	G	(Mexico) Pedro Rodríguez	Ret	Ret	Ret	2	3	NC^{F}	Ret	6	Ret	3	Ret	4						28	**5th**
1968	Owen Racing Organisation	BRM P126; BRM P133; BRM P138	BRM P101 3.0 V12	G	(United Kingdom) Richard Attwood			2^{F}	Ret	7	7	Ret	14										28	**5th**
1968	Owen Racing Organisation	BRM P126; BRM P133; BRM P138	BRM P101 3.0 V12	G	(United States) Bobby Unser									DNS		Ret							28	**5th**
1968	Reg Parnell Racing	BRM P126	BRM P101 3.0 V12	G	(United Kingdom) Piers Courage		Ret	Ret	Ret	Ret	6	8	8	4	Ret	Ret	Ret						28	**5th**
1968	Bernard White Racing	BRM P261	BRM P101 3.0 V12	G	(Australia) Frank Gardner									DNQ									28	**5th**
1968	Cooper Car Company	Cooper T86B	BRM P101 3.0 V12	F	(Italy) Ludovico Scarfiotti		4	4															14	**7th**
1968	Cooper Car Company	Cooper T86B	BRM P101 3.0 V12	F	(United Kingdom) Brian Redman		3		Ret														14	**7th**
1968	Cooper Car Company	Cooper T86B	BRM P101 3.0 V12	F	(United Kingdom) Vic Elford						4	Ret	Ret	Ret	5	Ret	8						14	**7th**
1968	Cooper Car Company	Cooper T86B	BRM P101 3.0 V12	F	(France) Johnny Servoz-Gavin						Ret												14	**7th**
1968	Cooper Car Company	Cooper T86B	BRM P101 3.0 V12	F	(United Kingdom) Robin Widdows							Ret		DNA									14	**7th**
1968	Cooper Car Company	Cooper T86B	BRM P101 3.0 V12	F	(Belgium) Lucien Bianchi			3	6	Ret			Ret		NC	NC	Ret						14	**7th**
1968	Bruce McLaren Motor Racing	McLaren M5A	BRM P101 3.0 V12	G	(New Zealand) Denny Hulme	5																	10th	**3**
1968	Joakim Bonnier Racing Team	McLaren M5A	BRM P101 3.0 V12	G	(Sweden) Joakim Bonnier			DNQ	Ret	8		Ret		6	Ret	NC	PO						10th	**3**
1969	Owen Racing Organisation	BRM P138; BRM P133; BRM P139	BRM P101 3.0 V12; BRM P142 3.0 V12	D		RSA	ESP	MON	NED	FRA	GBR	GER	ITA	CAN	USA	MEX							7	**6th**
1969	Owen Racing Organisation	BRM P138; BRM P133; BRM P139	BRM P101 3.0 V12; BRM P142 3.0 V12	D	(United Kingdom) Jackie Oliver	7	Ret	Ret	Ret		Ret	Ret	Ret	Ret	Ret	6							7	**6th**
1969	Owen Racing Organisation	BRM P138; BRM P133; BRM P139	BRM P101 3.0 V12; BRM P142 3.0 V12	D	(United Kingdom) John Surtees	Ret	5	Ret	9		Ret	DNS	NC	Ret	3	Ret							7	**6th**
1969	Owen Racing Organisation	BRM P138; BRM P133; BRM P139	BRM P101 3.0 V12; BRM P142 3.0 V12	D	(Canada) Bill Brack									NC									7	**6th**
1969	Owen Racing Organisation	BRM P138; BRM P133; BRM P139	BRM P101 3.0 V12; BRM P142 3.0 V12	D	(Canada) George Eaton										Ret	Ret							7	**6th**
1969	Reg Parnell Racing	BRM P126	BRM P101 3.0 V12	G	(Mexico) Pedro Rodríguez	Ret	Ret	Ret															7	**6th**
1970	Owen Racing Organisation; Yardley Team BRM	BRM P153; BRM P139	BRM P142 3.0 V12	D		RSA	ESP	MON	BEL	NED	FRA	GBR	GER	AUT	ITA	CAN	USA	MEX					23	**7th**
1970	Owen Racing Organisation; Yardley Team BRM	BRM P153; BRM P139	BRM P142 3.0 V12	D	(Mexico) Pedro Rodríguez	9	Ret	6	1	10	Ret	Ret	Ret	4	Ret	4	2	6					23	**7th**
1970	Owen Racing Organisation; Yardley Team BRM	BRM P153; BRM P139	BRM P142 3.0 V12	D	(United Kingdom) Jackie Oliver	Ret	Ret	Ret	Ret	Ret	Ret	Ret	Ret	5	Ret	NC	Ret	7					23	**7th**
1970	Owen Racing Organisation; Yardley Team BRM	BRM P153; BRM P139	BRM P142 3.0 V12	D	(Canada) George Eaton	Ret	DNQ	DNQ		Ret	12	Ret		11	Ret	10	Ret						23	**7th**
1970	Owen Racing Organisation; Yardley Team BRM	BRM P153; BRM P139	BRM P142 3.0 V12	D	(United Kingdom) Peter Westbury												DNQ						23	**7th**
1971	Yardley Team BRM	BRM P153; BRM P160	BRM P142 3.0 V12	F		RSA	ESP	MON	NED	FRA	GBR	GER	AUT	ITA	CAN	USA							36	**2nd**
1971	Yardley Team BRM	BRM P153; BRM P160	BRM P142 3.0 V12	F	(Switzerland) Jo Siffert	Ret	Ret	Ret	6	4	9	DSQ	1^{P}^{F}	9	9	2							36	**2nd**
1971	Yardley Team BRM	BRM P153; BRM P160	BRM P142 3.0 V12	F	(New Zealand) Howden Ganley	Ret	10	DNQ	7	10	8	Ret	Ret	5	DNS	4							36	**2nd**
1971	Yardley Team BRM	BRM P153; BRM P160	BRM P142 3.0 V12	F	(Mexico) Pedro Rodríguez	Ret	4	9	2	Ret													36	**2nd**
1971	Yardley Team BRM	BRM P153; BRM P160	BRM P142 3.0 V12	F	(United Kingdom) Vic Elford							11											36	**2nd**
1971	Yardley Team BRM	BRM P153; BRM P160	BRM P142 3.0 V12	F	(United Kingdom) Peter Gethin								10	1	14	9							36	**2nd**
1971	Yardley Team BRM	BRM P153; BRM P160	BRM P142 3.0 V12	F	(Austria) Helmut Marko								11	Ret	12	13							36	**2nd**
1971	Yardley Team BRM	BRM P153; BRM P160	BRM P142 3.0 V12	F	(Canada) John Cannon											14							36	**2nd**
1972	Marlboro BRM	BRM P160B; BRM P153; BRM P180; BRM P160C	BRM P142 3.0 V12	F		ARG	RSA	ESP	MON	BEL	FRA	GBR	GER	AUT	ITA	CAN	USA						14	**7th**
1972	Marlboro BRM	BRM P160B; BRM P153; BRM P180; BRM P160C	BRM P142 3.0 V12	F	(Sweden) Reine Wisell	Ret		Ret	Ret		Ret		Ret		12								14	**7th**
1972	Marlboro BRM	BRM P160B; BRM P153; BRM P180; BRM P160C	BRM P142 3.0 V12	F	(New Zealand) Howden Ganley	9	NC	Ret	Ret	8	DNS		4	6	11	10	Ret						14	**7th**
1972	Marlboro BRM	BRM P160B; BRM P153; BRM P180; BRM P160C	BRM P142 3.0 V12	F	(Austria) Helmut Marko	10	14		8	10	Ret												14	**7th**
1972	Marlboro BRM	BRM P160B; BRM P153; BRM P180; BRM P160C	BRM P142 3.0 V12	F	(United Kingdom) Peter Gethin	Ret	NC	Ret	Ret	Ret	DNS	Ret		13	6	Ret	Ret						14	**7th**
1972	Marlboro BRM	BRM P160B; BRM P153; BRM P180; BRM P160C	BRM P142 3.0 V12	F	(Spain) Alex Soler-Roig	Ret		Ret															14	**7th**
1972	Marlboro BRM	BRM P160B; BRM P153; BRM P180; BRM P160C	BRM P142 3.0 V12	F	(France) Jean-Pierre Beltoise		Ret	Ret	1^{F}	Ret	15	11	9	8	8	Ret	Ret						14	**7th**
1972	Marlboro BRM	BRM P160B; BRM P153; BRM P180; BRM P160C	BRM P142 3.0 V12	F	(Australia) Vern Schuppan					DNS													14	**7th**
1972	Marlboro BRM	BRM P160B; BRM P153; BRM P180; BRM P160C	BRM P142 3.0 V12	F	(United Kingdom) Jackie Oliver							Ret											14	**7th**
1972	Marlboro BRM	BRM P160B; BRM P153; BRM P180; BRM P160C	BRM P142 3.0 V12	F	(Canada) Bill Brack											Ret							14	**7th**
1972	Marlboro BRM	BRM P160B; BRM P153; BRM P180; BRM P160C	BRM P142 3.0 V12	F	(United Kingdom) Brian Redman												Ret						14	**7th**
1973	Marlboro BRM	BRM P160C; BRM P160D	BRM P142 3.0 V12	F		ARG	BRA	RSA	ESP	BEL	MON	SWE	FRA	GBR	NED	GER	AUT	ITA	CAN	USA			12	**7th**
1973	Marlboro BRM	BRM P160C; BRM P160D	BRM P142 3.0 V12	F	(Switzerland) Clay Regazzoni	7^{P}	6	Ret	9	10	Ret	9	12	7	8	Ret	6	Ret		8			12	**7th**
1973	Marlboro BRM	BRM P160C; BRM P160D	BRM P142 3.0 V12	F	(Austria) Niki Lauda	Ret	8	Ret	Ret	5	Ret	13	9	12	Ret	Ret	DNS	Ret	Ret	Ret			12	**7th**
1973	Marlboro BRM	BRM P160C; BRM P160D	BRM P142 3.0 V12	F	(France) Jean-Pierre Beltoise	Ret	Ret	Ret	5	Ret	Ret	Ret	11	Ret	5	Ret	5	13	4	9			12	**7th**
1973	Marlboro BRM	BRM P160C; BRM P160D	BRM P142 3.0 V12	F	(United Kingdom) Peter Gethin														Ret				12	**7th**
1974	Team BRM	BRM P160E; BRM P201	BRM P142 3.0 V12; BRM P200 3.0 V12	F		ARG	BRA	RSA	ESP	BEL	MON	SWE	NED	FRA	GBR	GER	AUT	ITA	CAN	USA			10	**7th**
1974	Team BRM	BRM P160E; BRM P201	BRM P142 3.0 V12; BRM P200 3.0 V12	F	(France) Jean-Pierre Beltoise	5	10	2	Ret	5	Ret	Ret	Ret	10	12	Ret	Ret	Ret	NC	DNQ			10	**7th**
1974	Team BRM	BRM P160E; BRM P201	BRM P142 3.0 V12; BRM P200 3.0 V12	F	(France) François Migault	Ret	16	15	Ret	16	Ret		Ret	14	NC	DNQ		Ret					10	**7th**
1974	Team BRM	BRM P160E; BRM P201	BRM P142 3.0 V12; BRM P200 3.0 V12	F	(France) Henri Pescarolo	9	14	18	12	Ret	Ret	Ret	Ret	Ret	Ret	10		Ret					10	**7th**
1974	Team BRM	BRM P160E; BRM P201	BRM P142 3.0 V12; BRM P200 3.0 V12	F	(New Zealand) Chris Amon														NC	9			10	**7th**
1975	Stanley-BRM	BRM P201	BRM P200 3.0 V12	G		ARG	BRA	RSA	ESP	MON	BEL	SWE	NED	FRA	GBR	GER	AUT	ITA	USA				0	-'
1975	Stanley-BRM	BRM P201	BRM P200 3.0 V12	G	(United Kingdom) Mike Wilds	Ret	Ret																0	-'
1975	Stanley-BRM	BRM P201	BRM P200 3.0 V12	G	(United Kingdom) Bob Evans			15	Ret	DNQ	9	13	Ret	17			Ret	Ret					0	-'
1976	Stanley-BRM	BRM P201B	BRM P200 3.0 V12	G		BRA	RSA	USW	ESP	BEL	MON	SWE	NED	FRA	GBR	GER	AUT	ITA	CAN	USA	JPN		0	-'
1976	Stanley-BRM	BRM P201B	BRM P200 3.0 V12	G	(United Kingdom) Ian Ashley	Ret																	0	-'
1977	Rotary Watches Stanley-BRM; Stanley-BRM	BRM P207; BRM P201B	BRM P202 3.0 V12; BRM P200 3.0 V12	G		ARG	BRA	RSA	USW	ESP	MON	BEL	SWE	FRA	GBR	GER	AUT	NED	ITA	USA	CAN	JPN	0	-'
1977	Rotary Watches Stanley-BRM; Stanley-BRM	BRM P207; BRM P201B	BRM P202 3.0 V12; BRM P200 3.0 V12	G	(Australia) Larry Perkins		Ret	15															0	-'
1977	Rotary Watches Stanley-BRM; Stanley-BRM	BRM P207; BRM P201B	BRM P202 3.0 V12; BRM P200 3.0 V12	G	(Sweden) Conny Andersson					DNQ		DNQ	DNQ	DNQ									0	-'
1977	Rotary Watches Stanley-BRM; Stanley-BRM	BRM P207; BRM P201B	BRM P202 3.0 V12; BRM P200 3.0 V12	G	(United Kingdom) Guy Edwards										DNPQ								0	-'
1977	Rotary Watches Stanley-BRM; Stanley-BRM	BRM P207; BRM P201B	BRM P202 3.0 V12; BRM P200 3.0 V12	G	(Belgium) Teddy Pilette											DNQ		DNQ	DNQ				0	-'
