= Grande Premio Presidente Emilio Medici =

1974 Grande Premio Presidente Emilio Medici
- Non-championship race in the 1974 Formula One season

Race details
- Date: February 3, 1974
- Official name: Grande Premio Presidente Emilio Medici
- Location: Autódromo Emilio Medici, Brasília, Brazil
- Course: Permanent racing facility
- Course length: 5.476 km (3.403 miles)
- Distance: 40 laps, 219.04 km (136.12 miles)

Pole position
Driver	(Argentina) Carlos Reutemann	Brabham-Cosworth
- Time: 1:51.18

Fastest lap
Driver	(Brazil) Emerson Fittipaldi	McLaren-Cosworth
- Time: 1:51.62

Podium
First	(Brazil) Emerson Fittipaldi	McLaren-Cosworth
Second	(South Africa) Jody Scheckter	Tyrrell-Cosworth
Third	(Italy) Arturo Merzario	Williams-Cosworth

The Grande Premio Presidente Emilio Medici was a non-championship Formula One race held on 3 February 1974 to inaugurate a new racing facility in Brasília, the Autódromo Emilio Medici. Carlos Reutemann qualified on pole and Emerson Fittipaldi set fastest lap and won. The race was held only this once.

== Qualifying ==
Pos.	No.	Driver	Constructor	Car	Lap	Gap
1	7	(Argentina) Carlos Reutemann	Brabham-Cosworth	Brabham BT44	1:51.18	+0.00
2	5	(Brazil) Emerson Fittipaldi	McLaren-Cosworth	McLaren M23	1:51.27	+0.09
3	3	(South Africa) Jody Scheckter	Tyrrell-Cosworth	Tyrrell 006	1:51.40	+0.13
4	18	(Brazil) Carlos Pace	Surtees-Cosworth	Surtees TS16	1:51.40	+0.00
5	20	(Italy) Arturo Merzario	Iso-Marlboro-Cosworth	Iso-Marlboro FW	1:53.43	+2.03
6	14	(France) Jean-Pierre Beltoise	BRM	BRM P160	1:54.44	+1.01
7	8	(Brazil) Wilson Fittipaldi	Brabham-Cosworth	Brabham BT44	1:54.62	+0.18
8	19	(Germany) Jochen Mass	Surtees-Cosworth	Surtees TS16	1:55.53	+0.91
9	15	(France) Henri Pescarolo	BRM	BRM P160	1:55.88	+0.35
10	10	(New Zealand) Howden Ganley	March-Cosworth	March 741	1:57.61	+1.73
11	9	(Germany) Hans-Joachim Stuck	March-Cosworth	March 741	1:58.10	+0.49
12	24	(United Kingdom) James Hunt	March-Cosworth	March 731G	2:04.95	+6.85

== Classification ==
Pos	No.	Driver	Constructor	Time/Laps	Grid
1	5	(Brazil) Emerson Fittipaldi	McLaren-Cosworth	1:15:22.75, 174.26 km/h	2
2	3	(South Africa) Jody Scheckter	Tyrrell-Cosworth	+0:12.40	3
3	20	(Italy) Arturo Merzario	Iso-Marlboro-Cosworth	+0:27.10	5
4	19	(Germany) Jochen Mass	Surtees-Cosworth	+1:38.84	8
5	8	(Brazil) Wilson Fittipaldi	Brabham-Cosworth	39 laps	7
6	10	(New Zealand) Howden Ganley	March-Cosworth	39 laps	10
7	15	(France) Henri Pescarolo	BRM	39 laps	9
8	14	(France) Jean-Pierre Beltoise	BRM	38 laps	6
9	18	(Brazil) Carlos Pace	Surtees-Cosworth	35 laps	4
10	9	(Germany) Hans-Joachim Stuck	March-Cosworth	34 laps/Engine	11
Ret	7	(Argentina) Carlos Reutemann	Brabham-Cosworth	12 laps/Holed piston	1
Ret	24	(United Kingdom) James Hunt	March-Cosworth	1 lap/Gear linkage	12

Previous race: 1973 BRDC International Trophy	Formula One non-championship races 1974 season	Next race: 1974 Race of Champions
Previous race: None	Grande Premio Presidente Emilio Medici	Next race: None
