= BRM P160 =

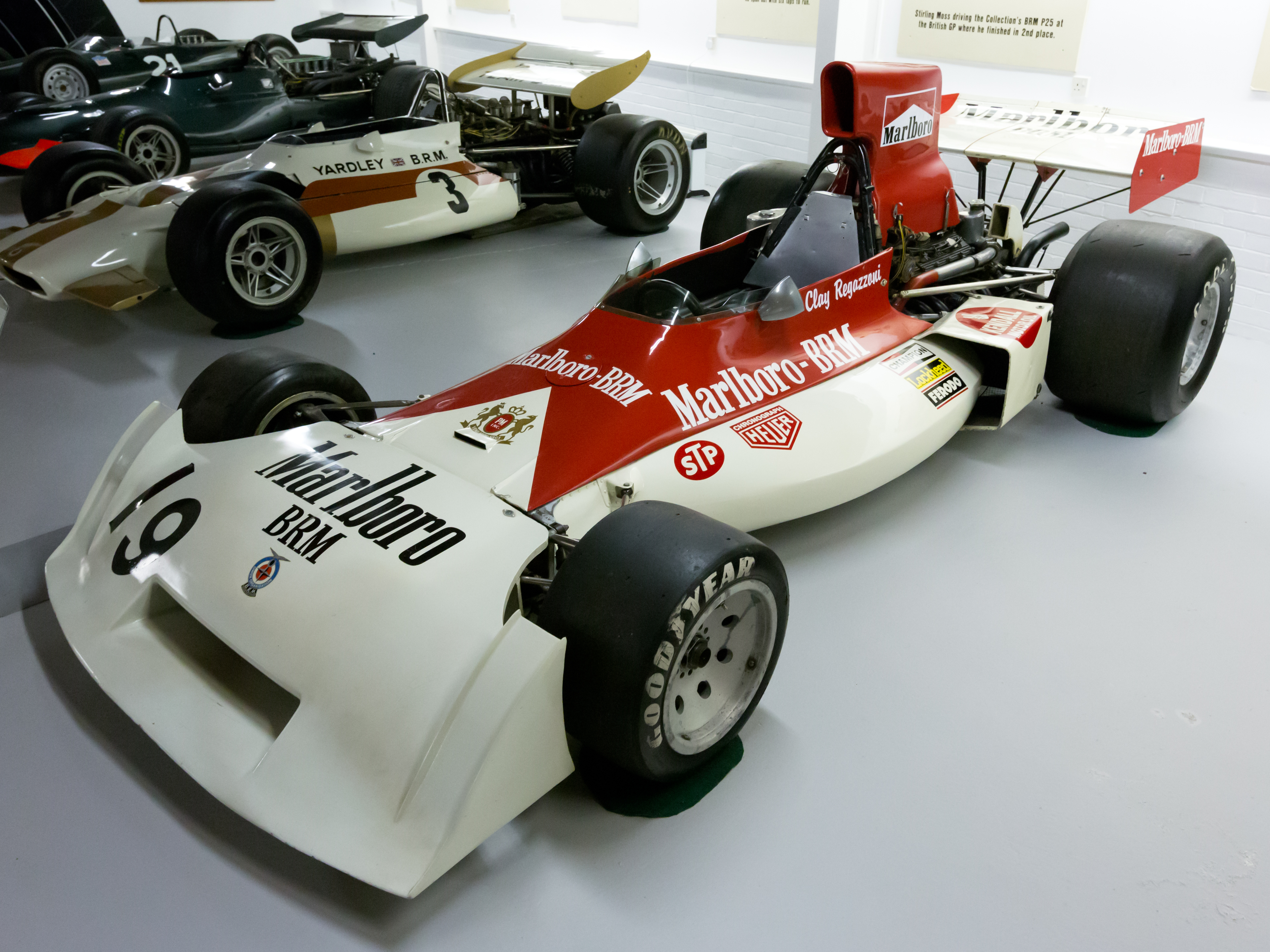
- Category: Formula One
- Constructor: British Racing Motors
- Designer: Tony Southgate
- Predecessor: P153
- Successor: P180 / P201

Technical specifications
- Chassis: Aluminium semi-monocoque with rear tubular subframe
- Suspension (front): Double wishbones, coil springs
- Suspension (rear): Double wishbones, coil springs
- Axle track: Front: 1,473 mm (58.0 in); Rear: 1,448 mm (57.0 in); 1,575 mm (62.0 in) (P160E)
- Wheelbase: 2,464 mm (97.0 in); 2,480 mm (98 in) (P160E)
- Engine: BRM P142 2,998 cc (182.9 cu in) V12 naturally aspirated, mid-mounted
- Transmission: BRM P161 5-speed manual
- Weight: 550 kg (1,210 lb); 573 kg (1,263 lb) (P160E)
- Fuel: 1971: Shell; 1972: BP; 1973: STP; 1974: Motul
- Tyres: Firestone

Competition history
- Notable entrants: Yardley Team BRM; Marlboro BRM; Team Motul BRM
- Notable drivers: (Mexico) Pedro Rodríguez (Switzerland) Jo Siffert (United Kingdom) Peter Gethin (New Zealand) Howden Ganley (France) Jean-Pierre Beltoise (Switzerland) Clay Regazzoni (Austria) Niki Lauda
- Debut: 1971 South African Grand Prix
Races	Wins	Poles	F/Laps
50	3	0	0
- Constructors' Championships: 0
- Drivers' Championships: 0
- Unless otherwise stated, all data refer to Formula One World Championship Grands Prix only.

The BRM P160 was a Formula One racing car designed by Tony Southgate for the British Racing Motors team, which raced in the 1971, 1972, 1973 and 1974 Formula One seasons. It was powered by a 3.0-litre V12 engine.

== Race history ==
=== 1971 ===
The P160 made its debut at the 1971 South African Grand Prix, but only one was entered for Pedro Rodríguez which retired with overheating. Switzerland's Jo Siffert drove the P153 in South Africa but drove the P160 for the rest of 1971. At Spain the Swiss retired with a broken gearbox and the Mexican finished fourth. The Monaco Grand Prix saw Siffert retire with a broken oil pipe and Rodríguez finished ninth. At Holland the Swiss finished sixth and the Mexican second. The French Grand Prix saw Siffert finish fourth and Rodríguez retire with an ignition failure. On 11 July 1971, Rodríguez was killed in an Interserie sports car race at Norisring in Nuremberg, Germany. BRM only entered Siffert for Britain who finished ninth. He was joined by Englishman Vic Elford for the German Grand Prix. The Swiss was disqualified for taking the short chute into the pits, after his right-hand lower front wishbone began to detach itself from the chassis and his ignition coil started to malfunction. Elford finished 11th. At Austria New Zealand's Howden Ganley switched from the P153 to the P160 and Englishman Peter Gethin joined for the remainder of the year. Siffert took the victory, Gethin finished 10th and Ganley retired with an ignition failure. The Italian Grand Prix saw the Englishman win and the New Zealander fifth but it was the closest finish in history between them and Ronnie Peterson's March, François Cevert's Tyrrell, and Mike Hailwood's Surtees. Siffert finished ninth. At Canada Canadian George Eaton joined the team but it was a bad race for BRM. Ganley did not start due to a crash, Siffert was ninth, Gethin 14th and Eaton 15th but the race was stopped after 64 laps due to the weather. The United States Grand Prix saw Austrian Helmut Marko join and Siffert finish second, Ganley fourth, Gethin ninth with Marko 13th. Siffert died in the World Championship Victory Race at Brands Hatch. When approaching Hawthorn Bend at high speed on lap 15, Siffert's BRM suffered a mechanical failure which pitched it across the track into an earth bank. The car rolled over and caught fire, trapping Siffert underneath.

=== 1972 ===
BRM kept New Zealand's Howden Ganley and Englishman Peter Gethin who were joined by Spaniard Alex Soler-Roig, using the P160B specification version for 1972 before it was replaced by the P160C version mid-season. The 1972 Argentine Grand Prix saw Soler-Roig retire with an accident. Gethin also retired with an oil leak and Ganley finished ninth. Jean-Pierre Beltoise missed Argentina because of legal problems following an accident at the track that claimed the life of Ignazio Giunti in a sportscar race in January 1971. At the South African Grand Prix, the Frenchman's engine failed, the Englishman and the New Zealander were nine and fourteen laps down respectively and were not classified. The Spanish Grand Prix was a bad race for BRM with all of their drivers retired; Soler-Roig and Sweden's Reine Wisell with accidents, Beltoise with a broken gearbox and Ganley's engine failed. At Monaco, the Frenchman took victory, the Englishman retired when he crashed and the Swede also retired when his engine failed. The Belgian Grand Prix saw Ganley eighth, Beltoise retire with overheating and Gethin also retire with a fuel pump failure. At France, the Frenchman finished 15th, the Swede retired with a broken gearbox and the Austrian also retired with an eye injury after a stone thrown up by Emerson Fittipaldi's Lotus pierced his helmet visor, permanently blinding him in his left eye and ending his driving career. At the British Grand Prix Beltoise finished 11th, Gethin's engine failed and Jackie Oliver's suspension failed. At Germany, the New Zealander finished fourth, the Frenchman ninth and the Swede retired when his engine failed. The Austrian Grand Prix saw Ganley sixth, Beltoise eighth and Gethin 13th. In Italy the Englishman finished sixth, Ganley 11th, and the Swede 12th. The Canadian Grand Prix saw Ganley 10th and Gethin retire with suspension failure. Engine failure caused both to retire in the United States.

=== 1973 ===
The BRM P160C specification began the 1973 before being replaced by the BRM P160D and BRM P160E spec versions mid-season. Beltoise was joined by Clay Regazzoni and Niki Lauda, The 1973 Argentine Grand Prix saw Regazzoni finish seventh, Beltoise retire when his engine failed and Lauda also retire with oil pressure failure. At Brazil, the Swiss finished sixth, the Austrian eighth and the Frenchman retired with electrical problems. The South African Grand Prix was a bad race for BRM as all of their drivers retired; Beltoise's clutch failed, Lauda's engine failed and Regazzoni crashed and was hit by Mike Hailwood who went to pull the Swiss driver from his burning car. Hailwood's driving suit caught fire, but after being extinguished by a fire marshall he returned to help rescue Regazzoni, an act for which he was awarded the George Medal. In Spain, the Frenchman finished fifth, the Swiss ninth and the Austrian retired with tyre problems. The Belgian Grand Prix saw Lauda fifth, Regazzoni 10th after an accident and Beltoise was fourteen laps down and was not classified. The 1973 Monaco Grand Prix was a bad race for BRM with all of their drivers retired, Beltoise had an accident, Lauda's gearbox broke and Regazzoni's brakes failed. The Swedish Grand Prix saw the Swiss ninth, The Austrian thirteenth and the Frenchman retire with engine failure. At France, Lauda finished ninth, Beltoise 11th and Reggazoni 12th. The British Grand Prix saw the Swiss seventh, the Austrian 12th and the Frenchman retired because he was involved in a first lap crash and did not restart. In Holland, Beltoise finished fifth, Reggazoni eighth and Lauda retired with a fuel pump failure. The German Grand Prix was a bad race for BRM with all of their drivers retired, The Frenchman's gearbox broke, The Swiss's engine failed and the Austrian's suspension failed, causing an accident from which he escaped with a broken wrist. The accident forced Lauda to miss his home race in Austria but on Lauda's home track Beltoise finished fifth and Regazzoni sixth. The Italian Grand Prix, saw the Frenchman finish 13th, the Austrian retire with an accident and the Swiss also retired when his ignition failed. Peter Gethin replaced Regazzoni for Canada but he retired with a broken oil pump. Lauda also retired with a transmission failure and Beltoise finished fourth. The 1973 United States Grand Prix saw the Swiss eighth, the Frenchman ninth and The Austrian retire with a broken oil pump.

=== 1974 ===
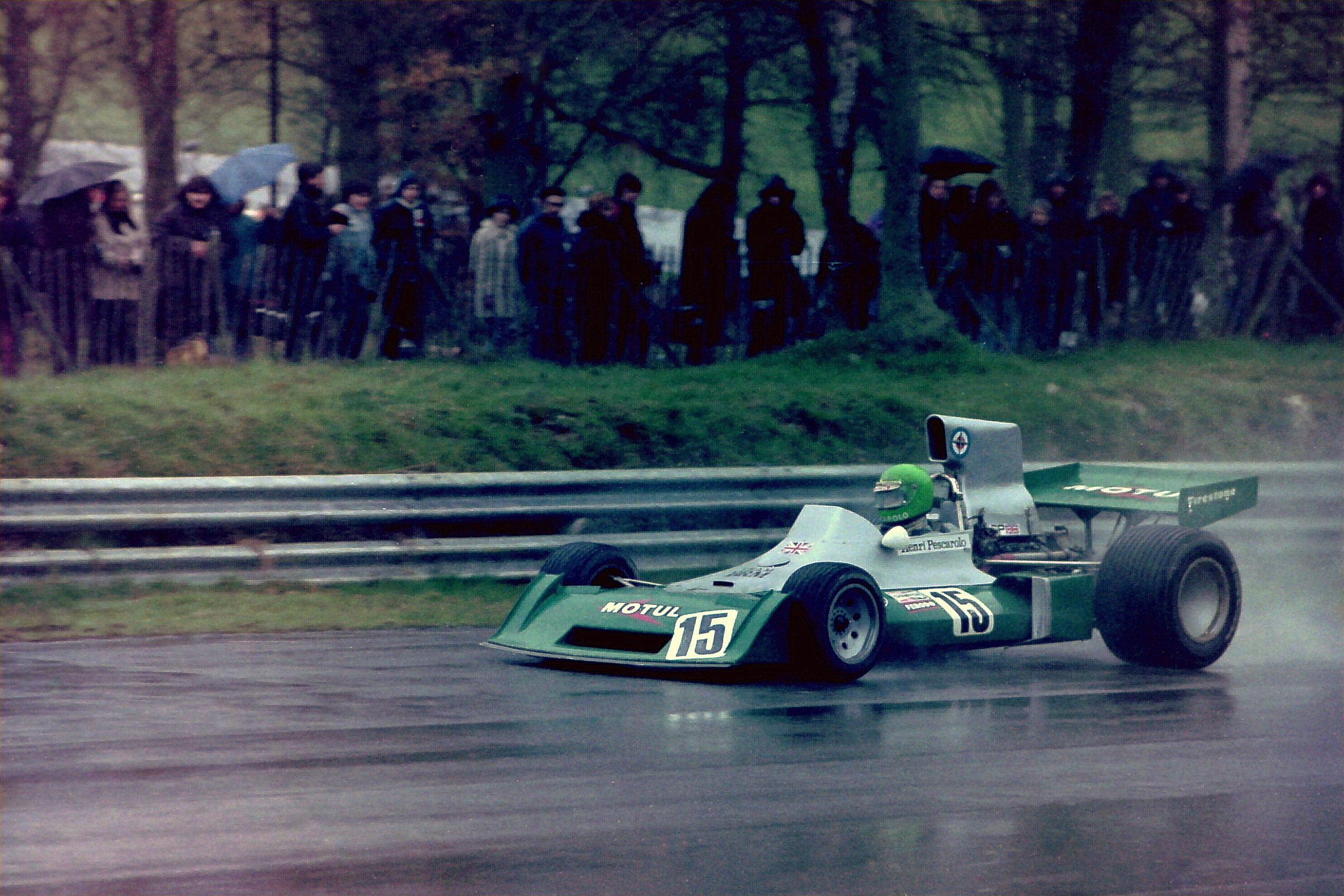
Henri Pescarolo at the 1974 Race of Champions

The BRM P160E competed in most of the 1974 season before being replaced by the BRM P201. Beltoise stayed but Clay Regazzoni and Niki Lauda both left for Ferrari and were replaced by Henri Pescarolo and François Migault.

== Complete Formula One World Championship results ==
Year	Entrant	Chassis	Engine	Tyres	Drivers	1	2	3	4	5	6	7	8	9	10	11	12	13	14	15	Points	WCC
1971	Yardley Team BRM	P160	BRM 3.0 V12	F		RSA	ESP	MON	NED	FRA	GBR	GER	AUT	ITA	CAN	USA					36	2nd
1971	Yardley Team BRM	P160	BRM 3.0 V12	F	Pedro Rodríguez	Ret	4	9	2	Ret											36	2nd
1971	Yardley Team BRM	P160	BRM 3.0 V12	F	Jo Siffert		Ret	Ret	6	4	9	DSQ	1	9	9	2					36	2nd
1971	Yardley Team BRM	P160	BRM 3.0 V12	F	Vic Elford							11									36	2nd
1971	Yardley Team BRM	P160	BRM 3.0 V12	F	Peter Gethin								10	1	14	9					36	2nd
1971	Yardley Team BRM	P160	BRM 3.0 V12	F	Howden Ganley								Ret	5	DNS	4					36	2nd
1971	Yardley Team BRM	P160	BRM 3.0 V12	F	George Eaton										15						36	2nd
1971	Yardley Team BRM	P160	BRM 3.0 V12	F	Helmut Marko											13					36	2nd
1972	Marlboro BRM	P160B; P160C	BRM 3.0 V12	F		ARG	RSA	ESP	MON	BEL	FRA	GBR	GER	AUT	ITA	CAN	USA				14	7th
1972	Marlboro BRM	P160B; P160C	BRM 3.0 V12	F	Howden Ganley	9	NC	Ret		8			4	6	11	10	Ret				14	7th
1972	Marlboro BRM	P160B; P160C	BRM 3.0 V12	F	Peter Gethin	Ret	NC		Ret	Ret		Ret		13	6	Ret	Ret				14	7th
1972	Marlboro BRM	P160B; P160C	BRM 3.0 V12	F	Alex Soler-Roig	Ret		Ret													14	7th
1972	Marlboro BRM	P160B; P160C	BRM 3.0 V12	F	Jean-Pierre Beltoise		Ret	Ret	1	Ret	15	11	9	8							14	7th
1972	Marlboro BRM	P160B; P160C	BRM 3.0 V12	F	Reine Wisell			Ret	Ret		Ret		Ret		12						14	7th
1972	Marlboro BRM	P160B; P160C	BRM 3.0 V12	F	Helmut Marko						Ret										14	7th
1972	Marlboro BRM	P160B; P160C	BRM 3.0 V12	F	Jackie Oliver							Ret									14	7th
1973	Marlboro BRM	P160C; P160D; P160E	BRM 3.0 V12	F		ARG	BRA	RSA	ESP	BEL	MON	SWE	FRA	GBR	NED	GER	AUT	ITA	CAN	USA	12	7th
1973	Marlboro BRM	P160C; P160D; P160E	BRM 3.0 V12	F	Jean-Pierre Beltoise	Ret	Ret	Ret	5	Ret	Ret	Ret	11	Ret	5	Ret	5	13	4	9	12	7th
1973	Marlboro BRM	P160C; P160D; P160E	BRM 3.0 V12	F	Niki Lauda	Ret	8	Ret	Ret	5	Ret	13	9	12	Ret	Ret	DNS	Ret	Ret	Ret	12	7th
1973	Marlboro BRM	P160C; P160D; P160E	BRM 3.0 V12	F	Clay Regazzoni	7	6	Ret	9	10	Ret	9	12	7	8	Ret	6	Ret		8	12	7th
1973	Marlboro BRM	P160C; P160D; P160E	BRM 3.0 V12	F	Peter Gethin														Ret		12	7th
1974	Team Motul BRM	P160E	BRM 3.0 V12	F		ARG	BRA	RSA	ESP	BEL	MON	SWE	NED	FRA	GBR	GER	AUT	ITA	CAN	USA	10	7th
1974	Team Motul BRM	P160E	BRM 3.0 V12	F	Jean-Pierre Beltoise	5	10														10	7th
1974	Team Motul BRM	P160E	BRM 3.0 V12	F	Henri Pescarolo	9	14	18	12	Ret	Ret		Ret								10	7th
1974	Team Motul BRM	P160E	BRM 3.0 V12	F	François Migault	Ret	16	15	Ret	16	Ret			14	NC	DNQ					10	7th

== Non-championship Formula One results ==
(key) (Races in bold indicate pole position) (Races in italics indicate fastest lap)

Year	Entrant	Chassis	Engines	Tyres	Drivers	1	2	3	4	5	6	7	8
1971	Yardley Team BRM	P160	BRM 3.0 V12	F		ARG	ROC	QUE	SPR	INT	RIN	OUL	VIC
1971	Yardley Team BRM	P160	BRM 3.0 V12	F	Pedro Rodríguez			10	1	4	DNA		
1971	Yardley Team BRM	P160	BRM 3.0 V12	F	Jo Siffert			6		Ret			**4**
1971	Yardley Team BRM	P160	BRM 3.0 V12	F	Peter Gethin							Ret	1
1971	Yardley Team BRM	P160	BRM 3.0 V12	F	Howden Ganley								Ret
1972	Marlboro BRM	P160B; P160C	BRM 3.0 V12	F		ROC	BRA	INT	OUL	REP	VIC		
1972	Marlboro BRM	P160B; P160C	BRM 3.0 V12	F	Peter Gethin	4	Ret	6	**Ret**	Ret	5		
1972	Marlboro BRM	P160B; P160C	BRM 3.0 V12	F	Jean-Pierre Beltoise	6	DNS	2					
1972	Marlboro BRM	P160B; P160C	BRM 3.0 V12	F	Howden Ganley	7		DNA		5			
1972	Marlboro BRM	P160B; P160C	BRM 3.0 V12	F	Helmut Marko		4						
1972	Marlboro BRM	P160B; P160C	BRM 3.0 V12	F	Vern Schuppan						4		
1973	Marlboro BRM	P160D; P160E	BRM 3.0 V12	F		ROC	INT						
1973	Marlboro BRM	P160D; P160E	BRM 3.0 V12	F	Jean-Pierre Beltoise	**6**							
1973	Marlboro BRM	P160D; P160E	BRM 3.0 V12	F	Niki Lauda	Ret	5						
1973	Marlboro BRM	P160D; P160E	BRM 3.0 V12	F	Vern Schuppan	Ret	9						
1973	Marlboro BRM	P160D; P160E	BRM 3.0 V12	F	Clay Regazzoni		3						
1974	Team Motul BRM	P160E	BRM 3.0 V12	F		PRE	ROC	INT					
1974	Team Motul BRM	P160E	BRM 3.0 V12	F	Henri Pescarolo	7	7	4					
1974	Team Motul BRM	P160E	BRM 3.0 V12	F	Jean-Pierre Beltoise	8							
1974	Team Motul BRM	P160E	BRM 3.0 V12	F	François Migault			5					
