= BRM P201 =

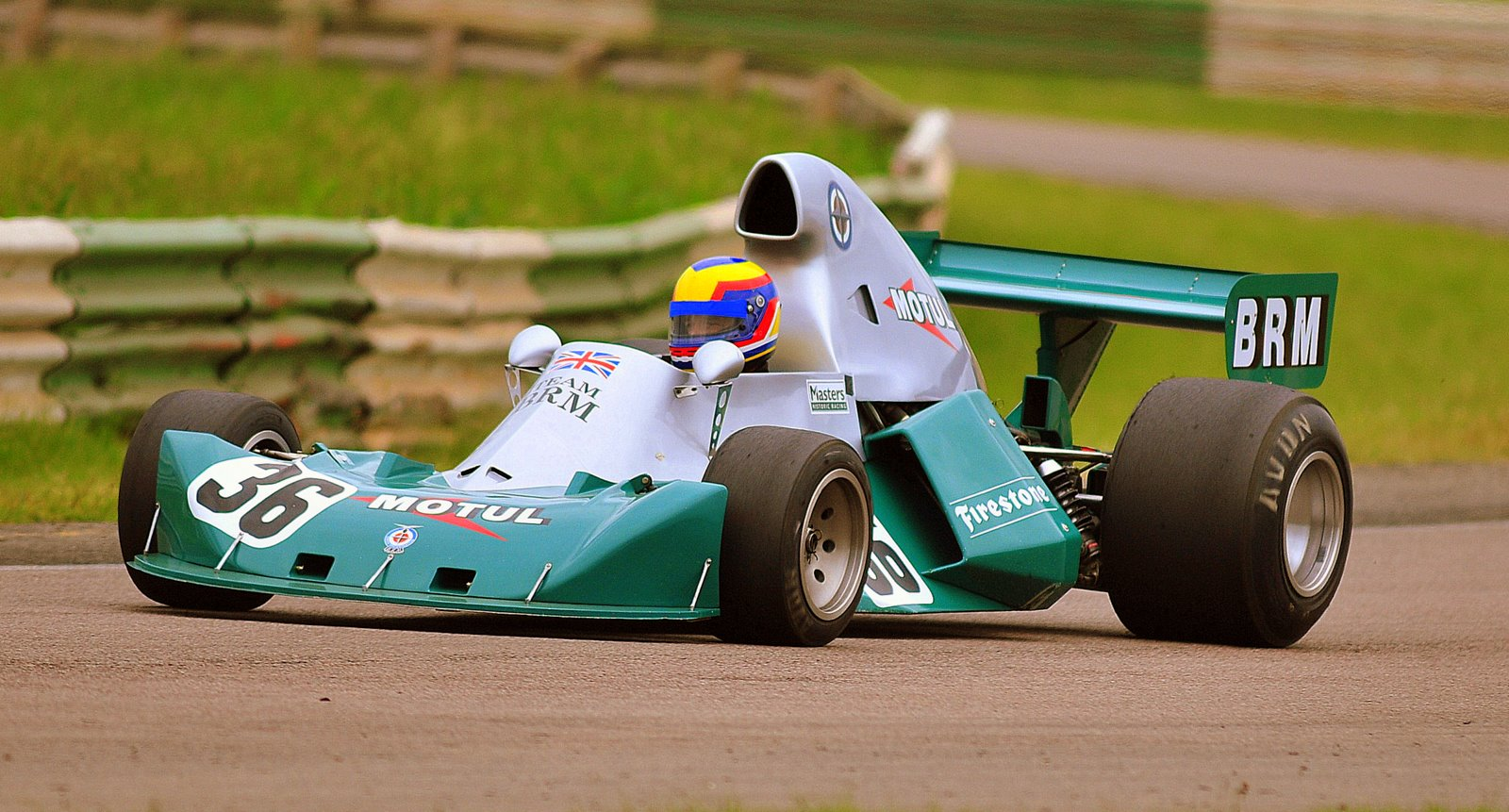
- BRM P201 being demonstrated at Mallory Park in 2009
- Category: Formula One
- Constructor: British Racing Motors
- Designer: Mike Pilbeam
- Predecessor: P160 / P180
- Successor: P207

Technical specifications
- Chassis: Aluminium alloy monocoque
- Axle track: Front: 1,540 mm (61 in); Rear 1,560 mm (61 in)
- Wheelbase: 2,591 mm (102.0 in)
- Engine: BRM 2,998 cc (182.9 cu in) V12 naturally aspirated, mid-mounted
- Transmission: BRM 5-speed manual
- Weight: 586 kg (1,291.9 lb)
- Tyres: Firestone (1974); Goodyear (1975–1977)

Competition history
- Notable entrants: Stanley BRM / Team Motul BRM
- Notable drivers: (France) Jean-Pierre Beltoise (New Zealand) Chris Amon (France) Henri Pescarolo
- Debut: 1974 South African Grand Prix
Races	Wins	Poles	F/Laps
26	0	0	0
- Unless otherwise stated, all data refer to Formula One World Championship Grands Prix only.

The BRM P201 is a Formula One racing car built by British Racing Motors and designed by Mike Pilbeam, which raced in the 1974 and 1975 seasons and in P201B specification in 1976 and 1977. The P201 featured a triangular monocoque, hip-level radiators, outboard front springs and inboard brakes. It used a 3.0-litre V12 engine and competed in 26 races, making 36 individual entries in total. Its best finish was second place for Jean-Pierre Beltoise at the 1974 South African Grand Prix, on the car's debut.

== Race history ==
=== 1974 ===
The car made its debut in the 1974 South African Grand Prix, driven by Jean-Pierre Beltoise, who qualified in 11th position. However, Beltoise was able to use qualifying tyres in the race due to the P201's handling, and was able to drive through the field for a second-place finish. At the Spanish Grand Prix, Beltoise again qualified 11th but retired after two laps, with an engine problem. At Belgium, he qualified seventh and finished fifth. At Monaco, Beltoise, who had qualified 11th and led the first practice times at one point, was in collision with Denny Hulme's McLaren on the first lap when the New Zealander got off-line and in attempting to rejoin, triggered a multiple accident. For this race, a second P201 chassis had been produced with outboard front disc brakes rather than inboard but was not used.

At Sweden, Henri Pescarolo drove the second chassis, with the brakes moved inboard, and he and Beltoise qualified 19th and 13th respectively. However, both retired, Pescarolo on lap one through fire and his teammate on lap three with an engine problem. At the 1974 Dutch Grand Prix, Beltoise tried both P201 chassis and raced the newer one. Pescarolo drove the second car in one practice session only and eventually raced a P160. The earlier P201 chassis was raced by François Migault who retired on lap 60 with gear linkage problems having qualified 25th, and last, on the grid. Beltoise qualified 16th and retired on lap 19, also with a gearbox problem.

At the French Grand Prix, the earlier chassis was adapted to suit Pescarolo and Beltoise drove the later car, which had modified cylinder heads. Beltoise qualified 17th and finished 10th. Pescarolo started 19th, 0.3secs behind his teammate, and retired after one lap due to clutch problems after a lengthy hold at the start. At the British Grand Prix, Beltoise qualified 23rd and Pescarolo 24th, after ignition, wheel and engine problems. Both were out-qualified by Migault in a P160, in 14th place. In the race, Beltoise finished 12th, three laps behind, and Pescarolo retired on lap 65 with an engine problem.

At the German Grand Prix, Beltoise was in P201/02 and a third P201 chassis had been built for Pescarolo. The two drivers qualified 15th and 24th respectively. The first P201 chassis was being rebuilt for Migault who used a P160 for this race. Pescarolo finished tenth, more than four minutes behind the winner Clay Regazzoni, and Beltoise retired on lap 5 when the engine stopped. For the Austrian Grand Prix, BRM made only one entry as a result of internal difficulties and Beltoise had P201/02 and P201/03 available. He practised both cars, qualified 18th, raced 02, and retired on lap 22 with engine failure.

At Monza, a fourth chassis was produced which was used by Pescarolo. Beltoise used P201/03 and Migault P201/02. Beltoise qualified 11th, Migault 24th, and Pescarolo 25th and last. Beltoise and Migault both retired after one lap with electrical and gearbox failure respectively. Pescarolo retired on lap 4 with engine failure.

At Canada, Pescarolo and Migault were both dropped from the team and Beltoise was joined by Chris Amon after the closure of his own team. Amon drove P201/04, qualifying 25th and Beltoise 03, qualifying 17th. Amon finished 17th, but was 10 laps behind and Beltoise 18th, 20 laps behind. Both were officially not-classified. At the American Grand Prix, Beltoise did not qualify after crashing P201/03 in practice but Amon qualified 04 in 12th position and finished ninth, 2 laps down.

=== 1975 ===
At the end of the 1974 season, Beltoise retired from F1 and Pescarolo left the team. BRM P201s participated in 11 of the 15 races in 1975, with one entry on each occasion. British driver Mike Wilds competed in the first two races, at Argentina and Brazil. He qualified 22nd at each race and retired from both, with engine failure (24 laps) and a broken flywheel (22 laps) respectively. He drove chassis No. P201/04 on each occasion.

Wilds was replaced for South Africa, by British driver Bob Evans. Evans qualified P201/02 in 24th place and finished 15th, 2 laps down. At the Spanish Grand Prix, he qualified a new chassis, P201/05, in 23rd position and retired after seven laps with fuel system problems. At Monaco, Evans failed to qualify chassis 05. In Belgium, he qualified P201/02 in 20th position and finished ninth, 2 laps down. For the Swedish Grand Prix, Evans resumed in P201/05, qualified 23rd and finished 13th, two laps behind. At the Dutch Grand Prix, he qualified P201/05 in 20th position but retired after 23 laps with transmission problems. At the French Grand Prix, Evans qualified P201/02 in 25th place and finished 17th two laps down.

The BRM team did not appear at the British or German Grands Prix stating that the V12 engine was felt to be uncompetitive. However, Evans qualified P201/02 in 22nd place but retired with engine problems (3 laps) at the Austrian Grand Prix. At the Italian Grand Prix, he qualified P201/05 in 20th position, but retired on lap one with electrical problems.

=== 1976–1977 ===
The BRM P201, upgraded to P201B specification, made only one appearance in each of the 1976 and 1977 seasons. At the 1976 Brazilian Grand Prix, British driver Ian Ashley qualified chassis P201/04 in 21st place and retired on lap three, with oil pump failure. BRM did not enter any further races in 1976 and after a non-appearance at the next race, in South Africa, the team was reported to have closed.

However, the team entered nine races in 1977, with the un-competitive BRM P207 qualifying only once. In addition, Australian Larry Perkins drove P201/04 at the South African Grand Prix, qualifying 22nd and finishing 15th, five laps behind winner Niki Lauda and three laps behind the rest of the field.

Of the five P201s built, four survive, and three have appeared in historic racing.

== Formula One World Championship results ==
(key)

Year	Entrant	Engine	Tyres	Drivers	1	2	3	4	5	6	7	8	9	10	11	12	13	14	15	16	17	Points	WCC
1974	Motul Team BRM	BRM P200 V12	F		ARG	BRA	RSA	ESP	BEL	MON	SWE	NED	FRA	GBR	GER	AUT	ITA	CAN	USA			10^{‡}	7th^{‡}
1974	Motul Team BRM	BRM P200 V12	F	Beltoise			2	Ret	5	Ret	Ret	Ret	10	12	Ret	Ret	Ret	NC	DNQ			10^{‡}	7th^{‡}
1974	Motul Team BRM	BRM P200 V12	F	Pescarolo							Ret	PO	Ret	Ret	10		Ret					10^{‡}	7th^{‡}
1974	Motul Team BRM	BRM P200 V12	F	Migault								Ret					Ret					10^{‡}	7th^{‡}
1974	Motul Team BRM	BRM P200 V12	F	Amon														NC	9			10^{‡}	7th^{‡}
1975	Stanley BRM	BRM P200 V12	G		ARG	BRA	RSA	ESP	MON	BEL	SWE	NED	FRA	GBR	GER	AUT	ITA	USA				0	—
1975	Stanley BRM	BRM P200 V12	G	Wilds	Ret	Ret																0	—
1975	Stanley BRM	BRM P200 V12	G	Evans			15	Ret	DNQ	9	13	Ret	17			Ret	Ret					0	—
1976	Stanley BRM	BRM P200 V12	G		BRA	RSA	USW	ESP	BEL	MON	SWE	FRA	GBR	GER	AUT	NED	ITA	CAN	USA	JPN		0	—
1976	Stanley BRM	BRM P200 V12	G	Ashley	Ret																	0	—
1977	Rotary Watches Stanley BRM	BRM P200 V12	G		ARG	BRA	RSA	USW	ESP	MON	BEL	SWE	FRA	GBR	GER	AUT	NED	ITA	USA	CAN	JPN	0	—
1977	Rotary Watches Stanley BRM	BRM P200 V12	G	Perkins			15															0	—

‡ Points were also scored by the P160 chassis.

== Non-Championship results ==
(key)

Year	Entrant	Engine	Driver	Tyres	1	2	3
1975	Stanley BRM	BRM P200 V12		G	ROC	INT	SUI
1975	Stanley BRM	BRM P200 V12	Evans	G	6	10	
1976	Stanley BRM	BRM P200 V12		G	ROC	INT	
1976	Stanley BRM	BRM P200 V12	Ashley	G	DNA		
1976	Stanley BRM	BRM P200 V12	Perkins	G	DNA		
