= Jean-Pierre Beltoise =

French racing driver and motorcycle road racer (1937–2015)

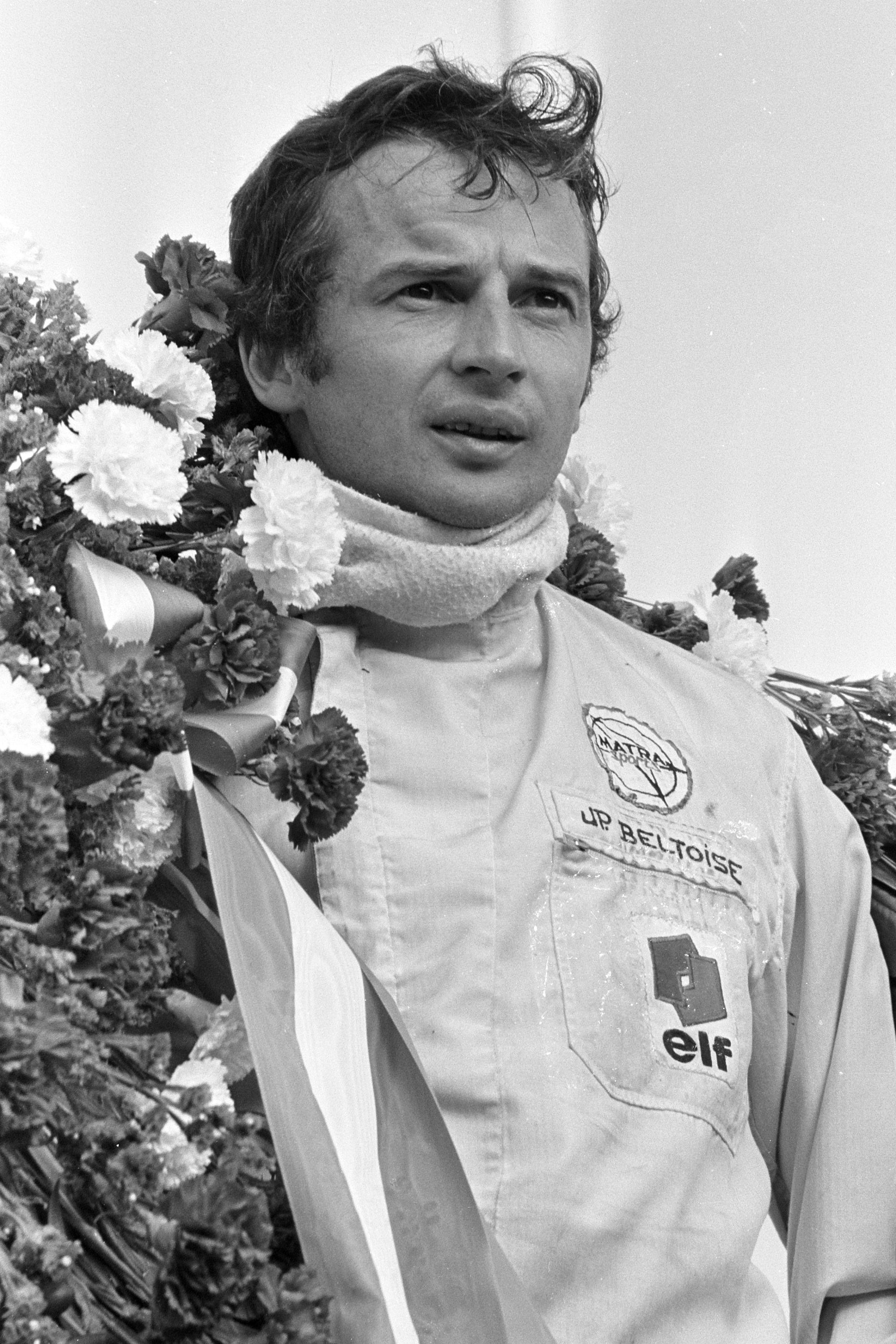
- Beltoise at the 1968 Dutch Grand Prix
- Born: Jean-Pierre Maurice Georges Beltoise; 26 April 1937; Paris, France
- Died: 5 January 2015 (aged 77); Dakar, Senegal
- Spouse: Jacqueline Cevert (m. 1968)
- Children: 2, including Anthony
- Relatives: François Cevert (brother-in-law); Vincent Beltoise (nephew)
Motorcycle racing career statistics
Grand Prix motorcycle racing
| Active years | 1962–1964 |
| First race | 1962 250cc French Grand Prix |
| Last race | 1964 50cc French Grand Prix |
| Team(s) | Morini, Kreidler, Bultaco |
Starts / Wins / Podiums / Poles / F. laps / Points; 8 / 0 / 1 / 0 / 0 / 16

Formula One World Championship career
- Nationality: (France) French
- Active years: 1966–1974
- Team(s): Matra, BRM
- Entries: 88 (86 starts)
- Championships: 0
- Wins: 1
- Podiums: 8
- Career points: 77
- Pole positions: 0
- Fastest laps: 4
- First entry: 1966 German Grand Prix
- First win: 1972 Monaco Grand Prix
- Last entry: 1974 United States Grand Prix

24 Hours of Le Mans career
- Years: 1963–1964, 1966–1967, 1969–1977, 1979
- Teams: Bonnet, Matra, Ligier, Inaltéra, Rondeau
- Best finish: 4th (1969)
- Class wins: 1 (1976)

Jean-Pierre Maurice Georges Beltoise (French pronunciation: [ʒɑ̃.pjɛʁ bɛl.twaz]; 26 April 1937 – 5 January 2015) was a French racing driver and motorcycle road racer, who competed in Grand Prix motorcycle racing from 1962 to 1964, and Formula One from 1966 to 1974. Beltoise won the 1972 Monaco Grand Prix with BRM.

Beltoise competed in Formula One for Matra and BRM, finishing fifth in the 1969 World Drivers' Championship with the former. Beltoise was also a class winner at the 24 Hours of Le Mans in 1976 with Inaltéra.

== Early career ==
Beltoise won 11 French national motorcycle road racing titles in three years. He competed in international Grand Prix motorcycle racing from the 1962 to 1964 seasons in the 50, 125, 250 and 500 cc classes. His best finish was a sixth place in the 1964 50 cc World Championship.

In 1964, Beltoise was racing a 1.1-litre René Bonnet sports car. His career almost ended with a huge crash in the Reims 12-hour sports car endurance race, in which he suffered a broken arm, so severely damaged that its movement was permanently restricted. However, he returned in 1965 and won the Reims Formula 3 race, after which he graduated to Formula 2 for the following season.

== Formula One ==
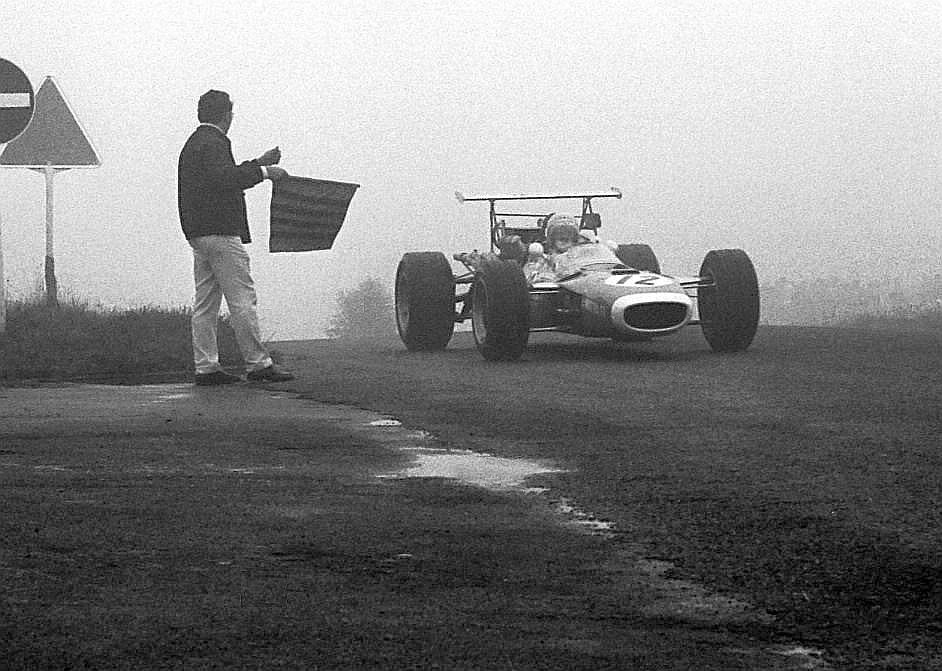
In a Matra car during practice for the 1968 German Grand Prix.

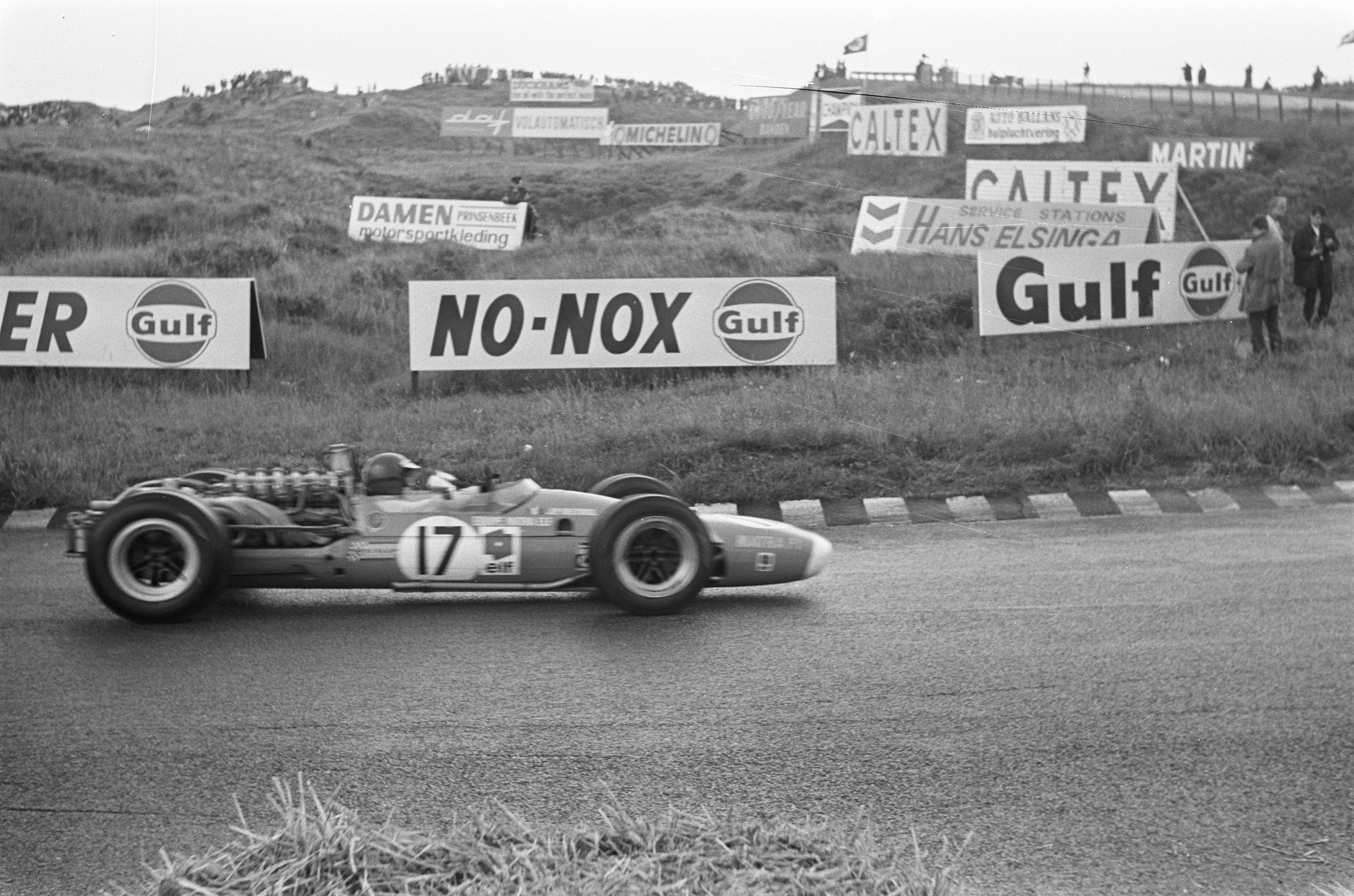
Beltoise at the 1968 Dutch Grand Prix.

In 1966, Beltoise drove in the German Grand Prix at the Nürburgring in a Formula Two (F2) one litre Matra MS5-Cosworth. He finished one lap down but won the F2 class. However, it was his only Grand Prix that season. In 1967 Beltoise competed in three Grands Prix with a Formula Two Matra MS7 1.6 litre Cosworth, and finished seventh at both Watkins Glen and Mexico City. He also won the 1967 Buenos Aires Grand Prix, which was not part of the World Championship calendar. In 1968, Beltoise began the season again with an F2 car but from the second race onward had Formula One machinery and finished second in the 1968 Dutch Grand Prix. In 1969, he was placed in Ken Tyrrell's Matra team, whilst the works V12 engine was developed driving alongside Jackie Stewart, and finished second in the French grand Prix. Beltoise returned to the works Matra team for both 1970 and 1971. In 1971, racing in the Matra sports car team, he was involved in the accident in which Ignazio Giunti died during the 1000 km Buenos Aires, and his international racing license was suspended, although he was allowed to compete while on appeal.

For 1972, Beltoise moved to the BRM team and won what turned out to be his only and BRM's final championship-qualifying Formula One victory at the 1972 Monaco Grand Prix in heavy rain. In that same year, he won a non-championship race in the end of the F1 season, at Brands Hatch, thus marking the last two victories of the BRM make in Formula One. He spent three seasons with BRM, and finally retired from Formula 1 at the end of the 1974 season.

== Later career ==
Beltoise later did most of the testing for the Ligier F1 team, although a proposed Formula One drive for 1976 went instead to Jacques Laffite and he thereafter turned his attention to touring car racing in France, twice winning the French title for BMW before entering rallycross in an Alpine-Renault with which he won the French title. In 1981, he returned to touring cars and raced for Peugeot throughout the 1980s. He was also a regular ice racer. His two sons, Anthony and Julien, are both race drivers.

In fiction, Beltoise frequently appeared in the Michel Vaillant series of comic books, amongst others being part of the winning Vaillante Le Mans team.

== Death ==
Beltoise died at his holiday home in Dakar, Senegal, on 5 January 2015, aged 77, following two strokes.

== Racing record ==
=== Motorcycle Grand Prix results ===
| **Position** | 1 | 2 | 3 | 4 | 5 | 6 |
| **Points** | 8 | 6 | 4 | 3 | 2 | 1 |

(key) (Races in italics indicate fastest lap)

| Year | Class | Team | 1 | 2 | 3 | 4 | 5 | 6 | 7 | 8 | 9 | 10 | 11 | 12 | Points | Rank | Wins |
|---|---|---|---|---|---|---|---|---|---|---|---|---|---|---|---|---|---|
| 1962 | 250cc | Moto Morini | ESP | FRA; 5 | IOM | NED | BEL | GER | ULS | DDR | NAT | ARG | | | 2 | 20th | 0 |
| 1963 | 50cc | Kreidler | ESP | GER | FRA; 5 | IOM | NED | BEL; 6 | | | FIN | | ARG | JPN | 3 | 11th | 0 |
| 1963 | 125cc | Bultaco | ESP | GER | FRA | IOM | NED | BEL; 6 | ULS | DDR | FIN | NAT | ARG | JPN | 1 | 20th | 0 |
| 1964 | 50cc | Kreidler | USA; 5 | ESP | FRA; 3 | IOM | NED | BEL | GER | | FIN | | JPN | | 6 | 6th | 0 |
| 1964 | 125cc | Bultaco | USA; 5 | ESP | FRA; 5 | IOM | NED | GER | DDR | ULS | FIN | NAT | JPN | | 4 | 13th | 0 |

=== 24 Hours of Le Mans results ===
| Year | Team | Co-Drivers | Car | Class | Laps | Pos. | Class Pos. |
|---|---|---|---|---|---|---|---|
| 1963 | (France) Automobiles René Bonnet | (France) Claude Bobrowski | René Bonnet Aérodjet LM6 | P 3.0 | 269 | 11th | 4th |
| 1964 | (France) Société Automobiles René Bonnet | (France) Gérard Laureau | René Bonnet Aérodjet | P 3.0 | 54 | DNF | DNF |
| 1966 | (France) Matra Sports SARL | (France) Johnny Servoz-Gavin | Matra M620 | P 2.0 | 112 | DNF | DNF |
| 1967 | (France) Equipe Matra Sports | (France) Johnny Servoz-Gavin | Matra MS630 | P 2.0 | 155 | DNF | DNF |
| 1969 | (France) Equipe Matra Elf | (United Kingdom) Piers Courage | Matra MS650 | P 3.0 | 368 | 4th | **2nd** |
| 1970 | (France) Equipe Matra-Simca | (France) Henri Pescarolo | Matra-Simca MS660 | P 3.0 | 79 | DNF | DNF |
| 1971 | (France) Equipe Matra-Simca | (New Zealand) Chris Amon | Matra-Simca MS660 | P 3.0 | 263 | DNF | DNF |
| 1972 | (France) Equipe Matra-Simca | (New Zealand) Chris Amon | Matra-Simca MS670 | S 3.0 | 1 | DNF | DNF |
| 1973 | (France) Equipe Matra-Simca Shell | (France) François Cevert | Matra-Simca MS670B | S 3.0 | 157 | DNF | DNF |
| 1974 | (France) Equipe Gitanes | (France) Jean-Pierre Jarier | Matra-Simca MS680 | S 3.0 | 104 | DNF | DNF |
| 1975 | (France) Gitanes Automobiles Ligier | (France) Jean-Pierre Jarier | Ligier JS2-Ford Cosworth | S 3.0 | 36 | DNF | DNF |
| 1976 | (France) Inaltéra | (France) Henri Pescarolo | Inaltéra LM-Ford Cosworth | GTP | 305 | 8th | **1st** |
| 1977 | (France) Inaltéra | (United States) Al Holbert | InaltéraLM77-Ford Cosworth | S +2.0 | 275 | 13th | 5th |
| 1979 | (France) ITT Oceanic Jean Rondeau | (France) Henri Pescarolo | Rondeau M379-Ford Cosworth | S +2.0 | 279 | 10th | **2nd** |

=== Complete European Formula Two Championship results ===
(key) (Races in bold indicate pole position; races in italics indicate fastest lap)

| Year | Entrant | Chassis | Engine | 1 | 2 | 3 | 4 | 5 | 6 | 7 | 8 | 9 | 10 | 11 | 12 | 13 | 14 | 15 | 16 | 17 | Pos. | Pts |
|---|---|---|---|---|---|---|---|---|---|---|---|---|---|---|---|---|---|---|---|---|---|---|
| 1967 | Matra Sports | Matra MS5 | Ford | SNE; Ret | SIL; Ret | NÜR; 10 | HOC | **TUL**; 3 | JAR; Ret | ZAN; 4 | PER; 2 | BRH; DNS | VAL; 2 | | | | | | | | 3rd | 27 |
| 1968 | Matra Sports | Matra MS7 | Ford | **HOC**; 1 | THR; 2 | **JAR**; 1 | PAL | TUL; 2 | ZAN; 1 | PER; NC | HOC | VAL; 4 | | | | | | | | | 1st | 48 |
| 1969 | Matra Sports | Matra MS7 | Ford | THR; 3 | HOC; 1 | NÜR; 3 | **JAR**; 2 | TUL; 4 | PER; Ret | VAL | | | | | | | | | | | NC | 0^{‡} |
| 1970 | Constructions Mécaniques Pygmée | Pygmée MDB15 | Ford | THR | HOC | BAR; Ret | ROU; DNQ | PER; Ret | TUL | IMO | HOC; Ret | | | | | | | | | | NC | 0 |
| 1971 | Constructions Mécaniques Pygmée | Pygmée MDB16 | Ford | HOC | THR | NÜR | JAR; DNS | PAL | ROU; Ret | MAN | TUL | | | | | | | | | | NC | 0 |
| 1971 | GTE Racing Cars | Lotus 69 | Ford | | | | | | | | | ALB; DNQ | VAL | VAL | | | | | | | NC | 0 |
| 1972 | Shell-Arnold Team | March 722 | Ford | MAL | THR | HOC | PAU; Ret | | | | | | | | | | | | | | NC | 0 |
| 1972 | Motul-Rondel Racing | Brabham BT38 | Ford | | | | | PAL; 6 | HOC | ROU; Ret | ÖST | IMO | MAN | PER | SAL | ALB | HOC | | | | NC | 0 |
| 1973 | STP March Racing Team | March 732 | BMW | **MAL**; Ret | **HOC**; Ret | THR; DNQ | NÜR | PAU; NC | KIN | NIV | HOC | ROU | MNZ | MAN | KAR | PER | SAL | NOR | ALB; 3 | VAL | 20th | 4 |
| 1974 | Écurie Elf | Alpine A367 | BMW | BAR | HOC; NC | PAU | SAL | HOC | MUG | KAR | PER | HOC | VAL | | | | | | | | NC | 0 |
| 1975 | Racing Organisation Course | Chevron B29 | Chrysler | EST | THR | HOC | NÜR | PAU; NC | HOC | SAL | | | | | | NOG; NC | VAL | | | | NC | 0 |
| 1975 | Écurie Elf | Alpine A367 | BMW | | | | | | | | ROU; Ret | MUG | PER | SIL | ZOL | | | | | | NC | 0 |

^{‡} Graded drivers not eligible for European Formula Two Championship points

=== Complete Formula One World Championship results ===
(key) (races in italics indicate fastest lap)

| Year | Entrant | Chassis | Engine | 1 | 2 | 3 | 4 | 5 | 6 | 7 | 8 | 9 | 10 | 11 | 12 | 13 | 14 | 15 | WDC | Pts |
|---|---|---|---|---|---|---|---|---|---|---|---|---|---|---|---|---|---|---|---|---|
| 1966 | Matra Sports | Matra MS5 (F2) | Ford Cosworth SCA 1.0 L4 | MON | BEL | FRA | GBR | NED | GER; 8 | ITA | USA | MEX | | | | | | | NC | 0 |
| 1967 | Matra Sports | Matra MS5 (F2) | Ford Cosworth FVA 1.6 L4 | RSA | MON; DNQ | NED | BEL | FRA | GBR | GER | CAN | ITA | | | | | | | NC | 0 |
| 1967 | Matra Sports | Matra MS7 (F2) | Ford Cosworth FVA 1.6 L4 | | | | | | | | | | USA; 7 | MEX; 7 | | | | | NC | 0 |
| 1968 | Matra Sports | Matra MS7 (F2) | Ford Cosworth FVA 1.6 L4 | RSA; 6 | | | | | | | | | | | | | | | 9th | 11 |
| 1968 | Matra International | Matra MS10 | Ford Cosworth DFV 3.0 V8 | | ESP; 5 | | | | | | | | | | | | | | 9th | 11 |
| 1968 | Matra Sports | Matra MS11 | Matra MS9 3.0 V12 | | | MON; Ret | BEL; 8 | NED; 2 | FRA; 9 | GBR; Ret | GER; Ret | ITA; 5 | CAN; Ret | USA; Ret | MEX; Ret | | | | 9th | 11 |
| 1969 | Matra International | Matra MS10 | Ford Cosworth DFV 3.0 V8 | RSA; 6 | | | | | | | | | | | | | | | 5th | 21 |
| 1969 | Matra International | Matra MS80 | Ford Cosworth DFV 3.0 V8 | | ESP; 3 | MON; Ret | NED; 8 | FRA; 2 | | GER; 12^{1} | ITA; 3 | CAN; 4 | USA; Ret | MEX; 5 | | | | | 5th | 21 |
| 1969 | Matra International | Matra MS84 | Ford Cosworth DFV 3.0 V8 | | | | | | GBR; 9 | | | | | | | | | | 5th | 21 |
| 1970 | Equipe Matra Elf | Matra-Simca MS120 | Matra MS12 3.0 V12 | RSA; 4 | ESP; Ret | MON; Ret | BEL; 3 | NED; 5 | FRA; 13 | GBR; Ret | GER; Ret | AUT; 6 | ITA; 3 | CAN; 8 | USA; Ret | MEX; 5 | | | 9th | 16 |
| 1971 | Equipe Matra Sports | Matra-Simca MS120B | Matra MS71 3.0 V12 | RSA | ESP; 6 | MON; Ret | NED; 9 | FRA; 7 | GBR; 7 | GER | AUT | ITA | CAN; Ret | USA; 8 | | | | | 22nd | 1 |
| 1972 | Marlboro BRM | BRM P160B | BRM P142 3.0 V12 | ARG | RSA; Ret | ESP; Ret | MON; 1 | BEL; Ret | FRA; 15 | | | | | | | | | | 11th | 9 |
| 1972 | Marlboro BRM | BRM P160C | BRM P142 3.0 V12 | | | | | | | GBR; 11 | GER; 9 | AUT; 8 | | | | | | | 11th | 9 |
| 1972 | Marlboro BRM | BRM P180 | BRM P142 3.0 V12 | | | | | | | | | | ITA; 8 | CAN; Ret | USA; Ret | | | | 11th | 9 |
| 1973 | Marlboro BRM | BRM P160D | BRM P142 3.0 V12 | ARG; Ret | BRA; Ret | RSA; Ret | | | | | | | | | | | | | 10th | 9 |
| 1973 | Marlboro BRM | BRM P160E | BRM P142 3.0 V12 | | | | ESP; 5 | BEL; Ret | MON; Ret | SWE; Ret | FRA; 11 | GBR; Ret | NED; 5 | GER; Ret | AUT; 5 | ITA; 13 | CAN; 4 | USA; 9 | 10th | 9 |
| 1974 | Team BRM | BRM P160E | BRM P142 3.0 V12 | ARG; 5 | BRA; 10 | | | | | | | | | | | | | | 13th | 10 |
| 1974 | Team BRM | BRM P201 | BRM P200 3.0 V12 | | | RSA; 2 | ESP; Ret | BEL; 5 | MON; Ret | SWE; Ret | NED; Ret | FRA; 10 | GBR; 12 | GER; Ret | AUT; Ret | ITA; Ret | CAN; NC | USA; DNQ | 13th | 10 |

Notes

- **^1** – In the 1969 German Grand Prix, Beltoise was classified 12th on the circuit but was the 6th Formula One car behind six Formula 2 cars, thus scoring one World Championship point.

=== Non-Championship Formula One results ===
(key) (Races in bold indicate pole position; results in italics indicate fastest lap)

| Year | Entrant | Chassis | Engine | 1 | 2 | 3 | 4 | 5 | 6 | 7 | 8 |
|---|---|---|---|---|---|---|---|---|---|---|---|
| 1967 | Matra Sports | Matra MS5 (F2) | Ford Cosworth FVA 1.6 L4 | ROC; Ret | SPC | INT | SYR | OUL; 5 | | | |
| 1967 | Matra Sports | Matra MS7 (F2) | Ford Cosworth FVA 1.6 L4 | | | | | | ESP; 10 | | |
| 1970 | Equipe Matra Elf | Matra-Simca MS120 | Matra MS12 3.0 V12 | ROC; DNS | INT | OUL | | | | | |
| 1971 | Equipe Matra Sports | Matra-Simca MS120B | Matra MS71 3.0 V12 | ARG | ROC | QUE | SPR | INT; Ret | RIN | OUL | VIC |
| 1972 | Marlboro BRM | BRM P160B | BRM P142 3.0 V12 | ROC; 6 | BRA; DNS | INT; 2 | OUL | REP | | | |
| 1972 | Marlboro BRM | BRM P180 | BRM P142 3.0 V12 | | | | | | VIC; 1 | | |
| 1973 | Marlboro BRM | BRM P160D | BRM P142 3.0 V12 | **ROC**; 6 | INT | | | | | | |
| 1974 | Team BRM | BRM P160E | BRM P142 3.0 V12 | PRE; 8 | ROC | INT | | | | | |

Sporting positions
| Preceded by Henri Grandsire | French Formula Three Championship; Champion; 1965 | Succeeded by Johnny Servoz-Gavin |
| Preceded by Peter Revson | Monaco Formula Three; Race Winner; 1966 | Succeeded by Henri Pescarolo |
| Preceded by Jacky Ickx | European Formula Two Championship; Champion; 1968 | Succeeded by Johnny Servoz-Gavin |
| Preceded by Inaugural | French Touring Car Championship; Champion; 1976–1977 | Succeeded by Lucien Guitteny |
