= BRM P180 =

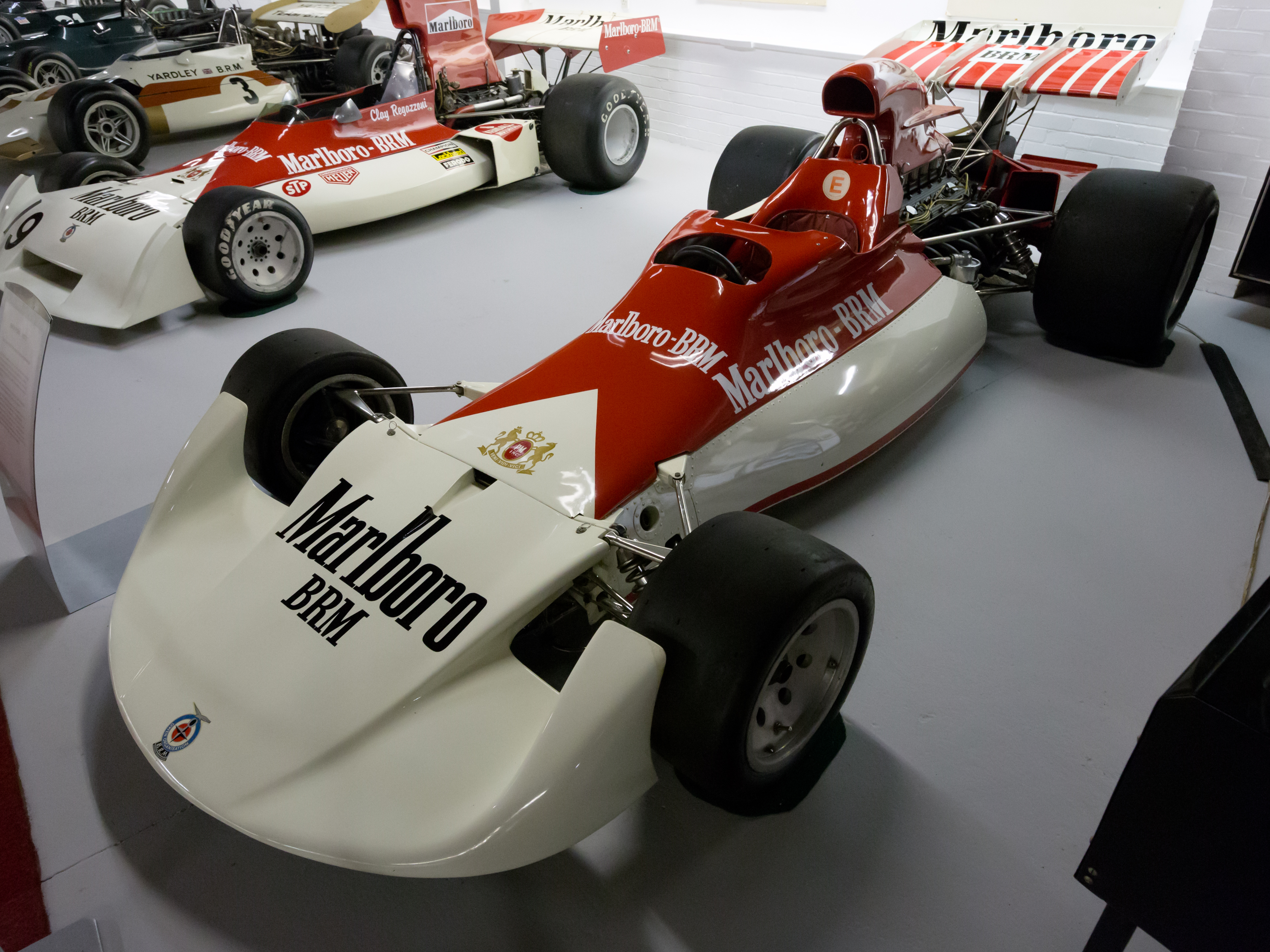
- Category: Formula One
- Constructor: British Racing Motors
- Designer: Tony Southgate
- Predecessor: P160
- Successor: P201

Technical specifications
- Chassis: Aluminium monocoque
- Suspension (front): Double wishbones, coil springs
- Suspension (rear): Double wishbones, coil springs
- Axle track: Front: 1,473 mm (58.0 in); Rear: 1,499 mm (59.0 in)
- Wheelbase: 2,540 mm (100 in)
- Engine: BRM 2,998 cc (182.9 cu in) V12 naturally aspirated, mid-mounted
- Transmission: BRM 161 5-speed manual
- Weight: 550 kg (1,210 lb)
- Fuel: BP
- Tyres: Firestone

Competition history
- Notable entrants: Marlboro BRM
- Notable drivers: (United Kingdom) Peter Gethin (New Zealand) Howden Ganley (France) Jean-Pierre Beltoise (United Kingdom) Brian Redman
- Debut: 1972 Spanish Grand Prix
Races	Wins	Poles	F/Laps
5	0	0	0
- Constructors' Championships: 0
- Drivers' Championships: 0
- Unless otherwise stated, all data refer to Formula One World Championship Grands Prix only.

The BRM P180 was a Formula One racing car, built by BRM and designed by Tony Southgate which raced in the 1972 Formula One season. It was powered by a BRM 3.0-litre V12 engine. One of the main features of the P180 was that the radiators had moved to the rear of the car, allowing the nose of the car to be very wide and flat. It competed in five World Championship Grands Prix, with a total of seven individual entries. The car scored no World Championship points, its best finish being eighth at the 1972 Italian Grand Prix.

== Race history ==
The car made its debut at the 1972 Spanish Grand Prix with Peter Gethin but retired when the engine failed. Howden Ganley drove the car at Monaco and retired through accident. The car did not reappear until the Italian Grand Prix, when it was driven by Jean-Pierre Beltoise and finished eighth. The Frenchman was joined by Canadian Bill Brack for Canada but Brack retired when he spun off and Beltoise also retired when he had an oil leak. For the United States Grand Prix, Brian Redman replaced Brack but he retired when his engine failed and Beltoise also retired when his ignition failed. The car won the non-championship 1972 World Championship Victory Race with Beltoise before being retired in favour of the older P160.

== Complete Formula One World Championship results ==
(key)(results in bold indicate pole position, results in italics indicate fastest lap)

Year	Entrant	Engine	Tyres	Driver	1	2	3	4	5	6	7	8	9	10	11	12	WDC	Points
1972	Marlboro BRM	BRM P161; 3.0 V12	F		ARG	RSA	ESP	MON	BEL	FRA	GBR	GER	AUT	ITA	CAN	USA	**14**^{‡}	7th
1972	Marlboro BRM	BRM P161; 3.0 V12	F	Peter Gethin			Ret										**14**^{‡}	7th
1972	Marlboro BRM	BRM P161; 3.0 V12	F	Howden Ganley				Ret									**14**^{‡}	7th
1972	Marlboro BRM	BRM P161; 3.0 V12	F	Jean-Pierre Beltoise										8	Ret	Ret	**14**^{‡}	7th
1972	Marlboro BRM	BRM P161; 3.0 V12	F	Bill Brack											Ret		**14**^{‡}	7th
1972	Marlboro BRM	BRM P161; 3.0 V12	F	Brian Redman												Ret	**14**^{‡}	7th

^{‡} All points were scored using BRM P160
