= 1973 Argentine Grand Prix =

- Layout of the Buenos Aires circuit in 1973

Race details
- Date: January 28, 1973
- Official name: X Gran Premio de la Republica Argentina
- Location: Autodromo Municipal Ciudad de Buenos Aires; Buenos Aires, Argentina
- Course: Permanent racing facility
- Course length: 3.346 km (2.079 miles)
- Distance: 96 laps, 321.216 km (199.584 miles)

Pole position
Driver	(Switzerland) Clay Regazzoni	BRM
- Time: 1:10.54

Fastest lap
Driver	(Brazil) Emerson Fittipaldi	Lotus-Ford
- Time: 1:11.22

Podium
First	(Brazil) Emerson Fittipaldi	Lotus-Ford
Second	(France) François Cevert	Tyrrell-Ford
Third	(United Kingdom) Jackie Stewart	Tyrrell-Ford

The 1973 Argentine Grand Prix was a Formula One motor race held at the Buenos Aires circuit on 28 January 1973. It was race 1 of 15 in both the 1973 World Championship of Drivers and the 1973 International Cup for Formula One Manufacturers. The 96-lap race was won by Lotus driver Emerson Fittipaldi after he started from second position. François Cevert finished second for the Tyrrell team and his teammate Jackie Stewart came in third.

== Classification ==
=== Qualifying ===
Pos	No	Driver	Constructor	Time	Gap	Grid
1	32	(Switzerland) Clay Regazzoni	BRM	1:10.54	—	1
2	2	(Brazil) Emerson Fittipaldi	Lotus-Ford	1:10.84	+0.30	2
3	18	(Belgium) Jacky Ickx	Ferrari	1:11.01	+0.47	3
4	6	(United Kingdom) Jackie Stewart	Tyrrell-Ford	1:11.03	+0.49	4
5	4	(Sweden) Ronnie Peterson	Lotus-Ford	1:11.06	+0.52	5
6	8	(France) François Cevert	Tyrrell-Ford	1:11.46	+0.92	6
7	30	(France) Jean-Pierre Beltoise	BRM	1:11.48	+0.94	7
8	14	(New Zealand) Denny Hulme	McLaren-Ford	1:11.70	+1.16	8
9	10	(Argentina) Carlos Reutemann	Brabham-Ford	1:12.08	+1.54	9
10	26	(United Kingdom) Mike Hailwood	Surtees-Ford	1:12.13	+1.59	10
11	16	(United States) Peter Revson	McLaren-Ford	1:12.22	+1.68	11
12	12	(Brazil) Wilson Fittipaldi	Brabham-Ford	1:12.31	+1.79	12
13	34	(Austria) Niki Lauda	BRM	1:12.39	+1.85	13
14	20	(Italy) Arturo Merzario	Ferrari	1:12.54	+2.00	14
15	28	(Brazil) Carlos Pace	Surtees-Ford	1:12.80	+2.26	15
16	36	(Italy) Nanni Galli	Williams-Ford	1:13.97	+3.43	16
17	24	(France) Jean-Pierre Jarier	March-Ford	1:14.27	+3.73	17
18	22	(United Kingdom) Mike Beuttler	March-Ford	1:15.15	+4.61	18
19	38	(New Zealand) Howden Ganley	Williams-Ford	1:15.29	+4.75	19

=== Race ===
Pos	No	Driver	Constructor	Laps	Time/Retired	Grid	Points
1	2	(Brazil) Emerson Fittipaldi	Lotus-Ford	96	1:56:18.22	2	9
2	8	(France) François Cevert	Tyrrell-Ford	96	+ 4.69	6	6
3	6	(United Kingdom) Jackie Stewart	Tyrrell-Ford	96	+ 33.19	4	4
4	18	(Belgium) Jacky Ickx	Ferrari	96	+ 42.57	3	3
5	14	(New Zealand) Denny Hulme	McLaren-Ford	95	+ 1 lap	8	2
6	12	(Brazil) Wilson Fittipaldi	Brabham-Ford	95	+ 1 lap	12	1
7	32	(Switzerland) Clay Regazzoni	BRM	93	+ 3 laps	1	
8	16	(United States) Peter Revson	McLaren-Ford	92	+ 4 laps	11	
9	20	(Italy) Arturo Merzario	Ferrari	92	+ 4 laps	14	
10	22	(United Kingdom) Mike Beuttler	March-Ford	90	Suspension	18	
Ret	24	(France) Jean-Pierre Jarier	March-Ford	84	Radiator	17	
Ret	30	(France) Jean-Pierre Beltoise	BRM	79	Engine	7	
NC	38	(New Zealand) Howden Ganley	Iso-Marlboro-Ford	79	+ 17 laps	19	
Ret	4	(Sweden) Ronnie Peterson	Lotus-Ford	67	Oil pressure	5	
Ret	34	(Austria) Niki Lauda	BRM	66	Oil pressure	13	
Ret	10	(Argentina) Carlos Reutemann	Brabham-Ford	16	Gearbox	9	
Ret	26	(United Kingdom) Mike Hailwood	Surtees-Ford	10	Halfshaft	10	
Ret	28	(Brazil) Carlos Pace	Surtees-Ford	10	Suspension	15	
Ret	36	(Italy) Nanni Galli	Iso-Marlboro-Ford	0	Engine	16	

== Notes ==
- This was the 5th pole position for a Swiss driver.
- This was the first fastest lap set by Emerson Fittipaldi and the first by a Brazilian driver.
- This was the Formula One World Championship debut for Italian constructor Iso-Marlboro, being entered by Frank Williams.
- This was the 200th Grand Prix for a Ferrari-powered car. In those 200 races, Ferrari-powered cars won 49 Grands Prix, achieved 183 podium finishes, 60 pole positions, 57 fastest laps, 18 Grand Slams, and won 6 Driver's and 2 Constructor's World Championships.

== Championship standings after the race ==
Drivers' Championship standings

Pos	Driver	Points
1	(Brazil) Emerson Fittipaldi	9
2	(France) François Cevert	6
3	(United Kingdom) Jackie Stewart	4
4	(Belgium) Jacky Ickx	3
5	(New Zealand) Denny Hulme	2

Constructors' Championship standings

Pos	Constructor	Points
1	(United Kingdom) Lotus-Ford	9
2	(United Kingdom) Tyrrell-Ford	6
3	(Italy) Ferrari	3
4	(United Kingdom) McLaren-Ford	2
5	(United Kingdom) Brabham-Ford	1

- Note: Only the top five positions are included for both sets of standings.

Previous race: 1972 United States Grand Prix	FIA Formula One World Championship; 1973 season	Next race: 1973 Brazilian Grand Prix
Previous race: 1972 Argentine Grand Prix	Argentine Grand Prix	Next race: 1974 Argentine Grand Prix
