= Howden Ganley =

New Zealand racing driver (born 1941)

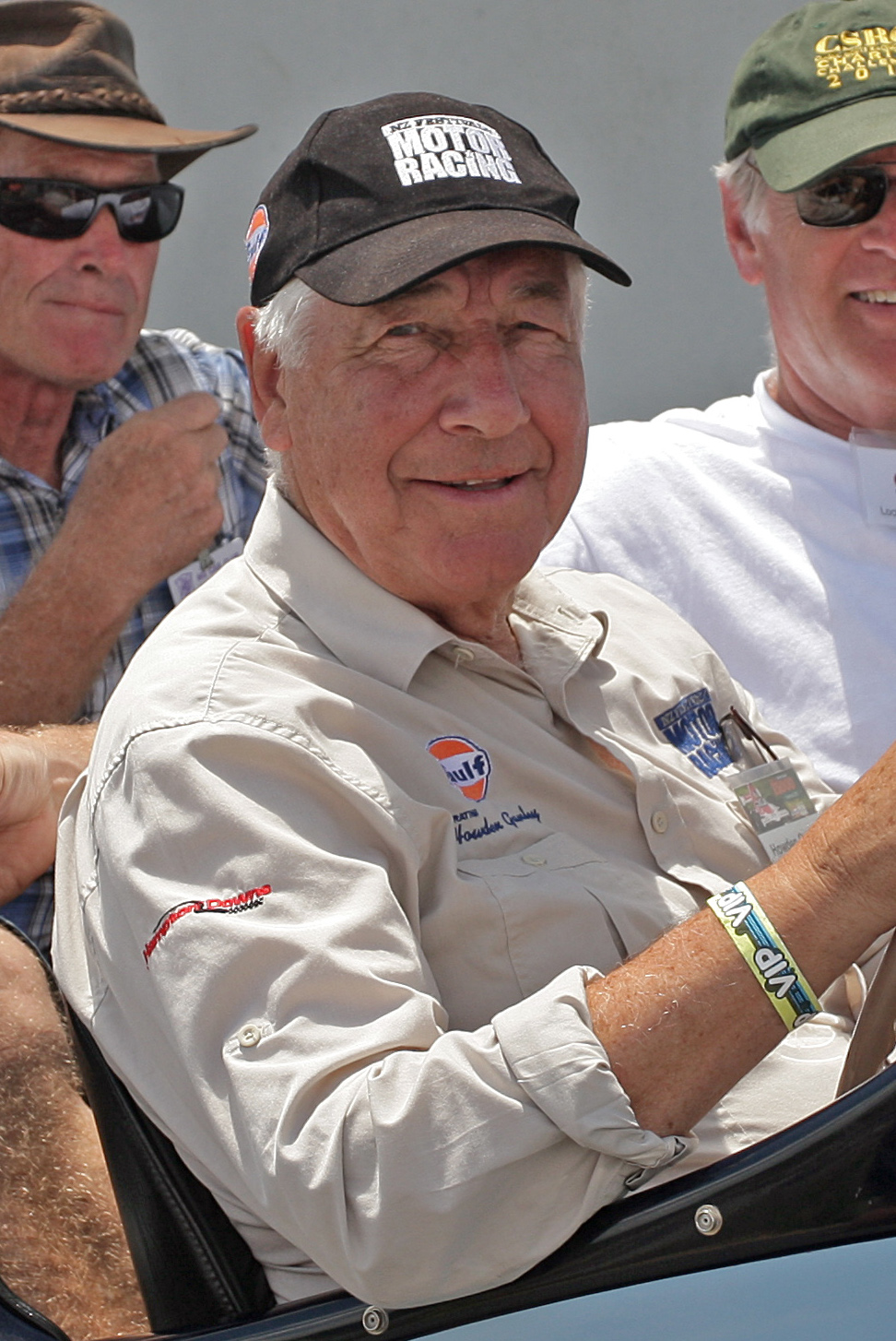
- Born: James Howden Ganley; 24 December 1941 (age 84); Hamilton, New Zealand

Formula One World Championship career
- Nationality: New Zealander
- Active years: 1971 – 1974
- Team(s): BRM, Iso–Marlboro, March, Maki
- Entries: 41 (35 starts)
- Championships: 0
- Wins: 0
- Podiums: 0
- Career points: 10
- Pole positions: 0
- Fastest laps: 0
- First entry: 1971 South African Grand Prix
- Last entry: 1974 German Grand Prix

James Howden Ganley (born 24 December 1941) is a former racing driver from New Zealand. From 1971 to 1974, he participated in 41 World Championship Formula One Grands Prix. He placed fourth twice and scored points five times for a total of ten championship points (only the top-six places scored points). He also participated in numerous non-Championship Formula One races.

== Personal and early life ==
When he was thirteen years old, Ganley attended the 1955 New Zealand Grand Prix at Ardmore which inspired him and provided him with an impetus to follow a career in racing. Immediately after leaving school, Ganley became a reporter for the Waikato Times and wrote a column for Sports Car Illustrated. He moved to the United Kingdom in 1961 and pursued a career as a mechanic.

== Career ==
=== Early career ===
Between 1960 and 1962, Ganley competed in many events throughout New Zealand driving a Lotus Eleven. Throughout this period, he was earning a living by working as a foreman for a concreting company.

In 1970, Ganley finished second to Peter Gethin in the European Formula 5000 championship. This caught the attention of the BRM Formula One team, who signed him to a contract for 1971.

=== Formula 5000 ===
In 1970, Ganley finished the European Formula 5000 Championship in second place with help from his friend and mechanic Barry Ultahan.

=== Formula One ===
In 1971, Ganley started off the season promisingly with fifth place at the non-championship Race of Champions. At the end of 1971, having scored two points finishes during the year, Ganley was awarded the Wolfgang von Trips Memorial Trophy for the best performance by a newcomer to Grand Prix racing. In 1972, Ganley raced for the Marlboro BRM team and finished 13th in the Championship with four points. His highest finish for the season was fourth at the Nürburgring. For the 1973 season, Ganley signed up to drive an Iso–Marlboro car for Frank Williams Racing. At the 1973 Canadian Grand Prix, he was almost declared the winner because of a timing mix up with the pace car; when the results were corrected, Ganley was classified sixth.

A suspension failure in practice for the 1974 German Grand Prix while driving for the Maki team left Ganley with serious foot and ankle injuries that ended his Grand Prix career.

=== Ganley F1 Car ===
In 1975, a Ganley F1 project was initiated. The Ganley-Cosworth 001 car was hand-built by Howden Ganley on his premises at Windsor. It was almost readied, and Ganley had two DFV engines at hand, but it never ran in anger. Ganley eventually used the equipment to start Tiga Race Cars with fellow driver Tim Schenken the following year.

=== Sportscars ===
Ganley and François Cevert drove a Matra-Simca MS670 to second place in the 1972 24 Hours of Le Mans.

=== Tiga Race Cars ===
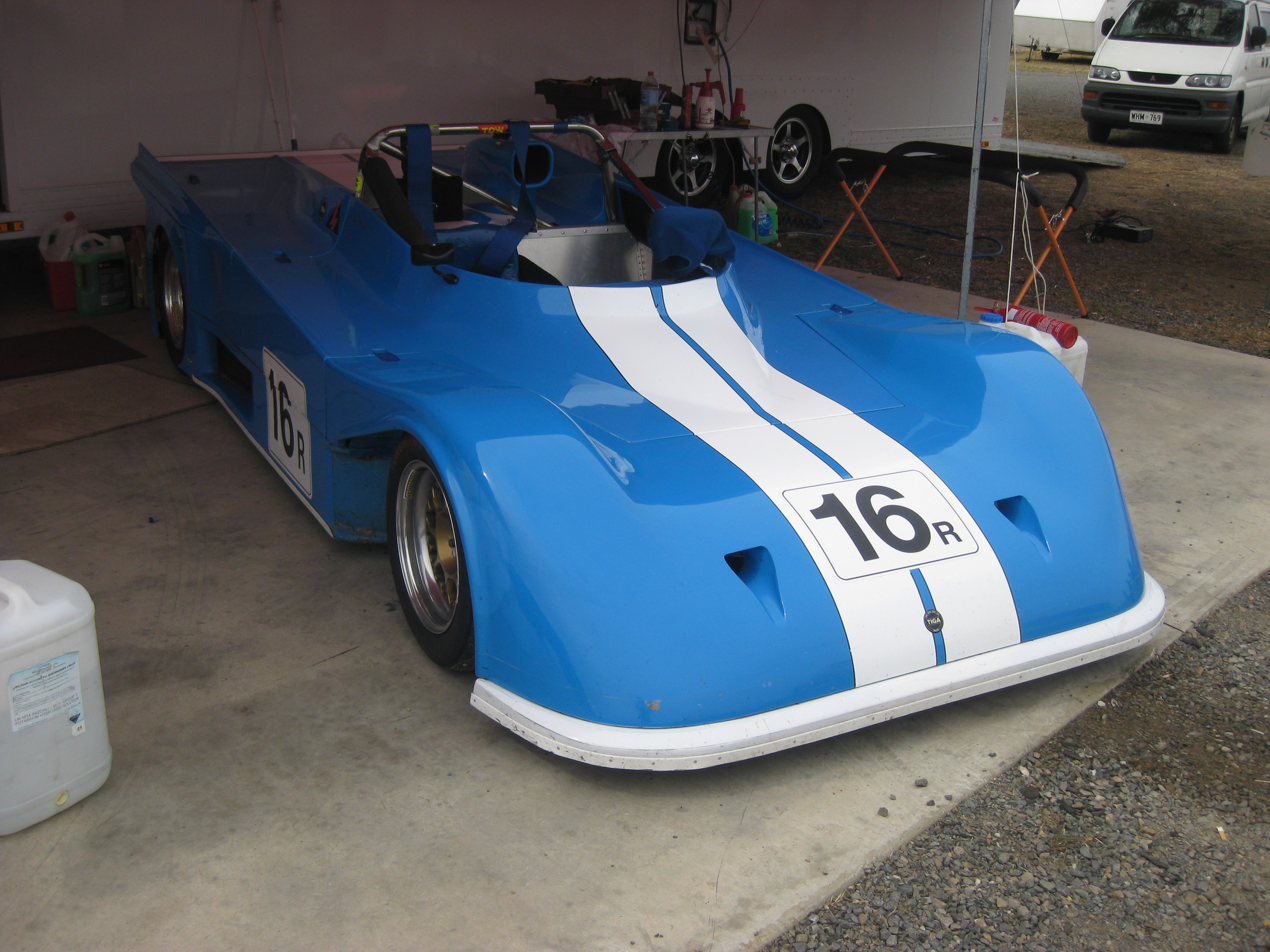
1983 Tiga SC83 Sports 2000 car

In 1976, Ganley and former Formula One driver Australian Tim Schenken founded Tiga Race Cars as a British-based race car constructor and race team. The team had plans to compete in Formula One in 1978, but the project did not proceed due to sponsorship withdrawal.

== Complete Formula One World Championship results ==
(key) (Races in bold indicate pole position)

Year	Team	Chassis	Engine	1	2	3	4	5	6	7	8	9	10	11	12	13	14	15	WDC	Points
1971	Yardley Team BRM	BRM P153	BRM P142 3.0 V12	RSA; Ret	ESP; 10	MON; DNQ	NED; 7	FRA; 10	GBR; 8	GER; Ret									15th	5
1971	Yardley Team BRM	BRM P160	BRM P142 3.0 V12								AUT; Ret	ITA; 5	CAN; DNS	USA; 4					15th	5
1972	Marlboro BRM	BRM P160B	BRM P142 3.0 V12	ARG; 9	RSA; NC	ESP; Ret		BEL; 8	FRA; DNS										13th	4
1972	Marlboro BRM	BRM P180	BRM P142 3.0 V12				MON; Ret												13th	4
1972	Marlboro BRM	BRM P160C	BRM P142 3.0 V12							GBR	GER; 4	AUT; 6	ITA; 11	CAN; 10	USA; Ret				13th	4
1973	Frank Williams Racing Cars	Iso–Marlboro FX3B	Ford Cosworth DFV 3.0 V8	ARG; NC	BRA; 7	RSA; 10													19th	1
1973	Frank Williams Racing Cars	Iso–Marlboro IR	Ford Cosworth DFV 3.0 V8				ESP; Ret	BEL; Ret	MON; Ret	SWE; 11	FRA; 14	GBR; 9	NED; 9	GER; DNS	AUT; NC	ITA; NC	CAN; 6	USA; 12	19th	1
1974	March Engineering	March 741	Ford Cosworth DFV 3.0 V8	ARG; 8	BRA; Ret	RSA	ESP	BEL	MON	SWE	NED	FRA							NC	0
1974	Maki Engineering	Maki F101	Ford Cosworth DFV 3.0 V8										GBR; DNQ	GER; DNQ	AUT	ITA	CAN	USA	NC	0

== Complete 24 Hours of Le Mans results ==
Year	Team	Co-drivers	Car	Class	Laps	Pos.	Class pos.
1972	(France) Equipe Matra Simca Shell	(France) François Cevert	Matra-Simca MS670	S 3.0	333	2nd	2nd
1973	(United Kingdom) Gulf Research Racing	(United Kingdom) Derek Bell	Mirage M6-Cosworth	S 3.0	163	DNF	DNF
1975	(Germany) Gelo Racing Team	(Australia) Tim Schenken	Porsche 911 Carrera RSR	GTS	106	DNF	DNF
1976	(Germany) Gelo Racing Team	(Germany) Clemens Schickentanz	Porsche 911 Carrera RSR	Gr. 5 SP	74	DNF	DNF
