= Tyrrell 006 =

Formula One racing car

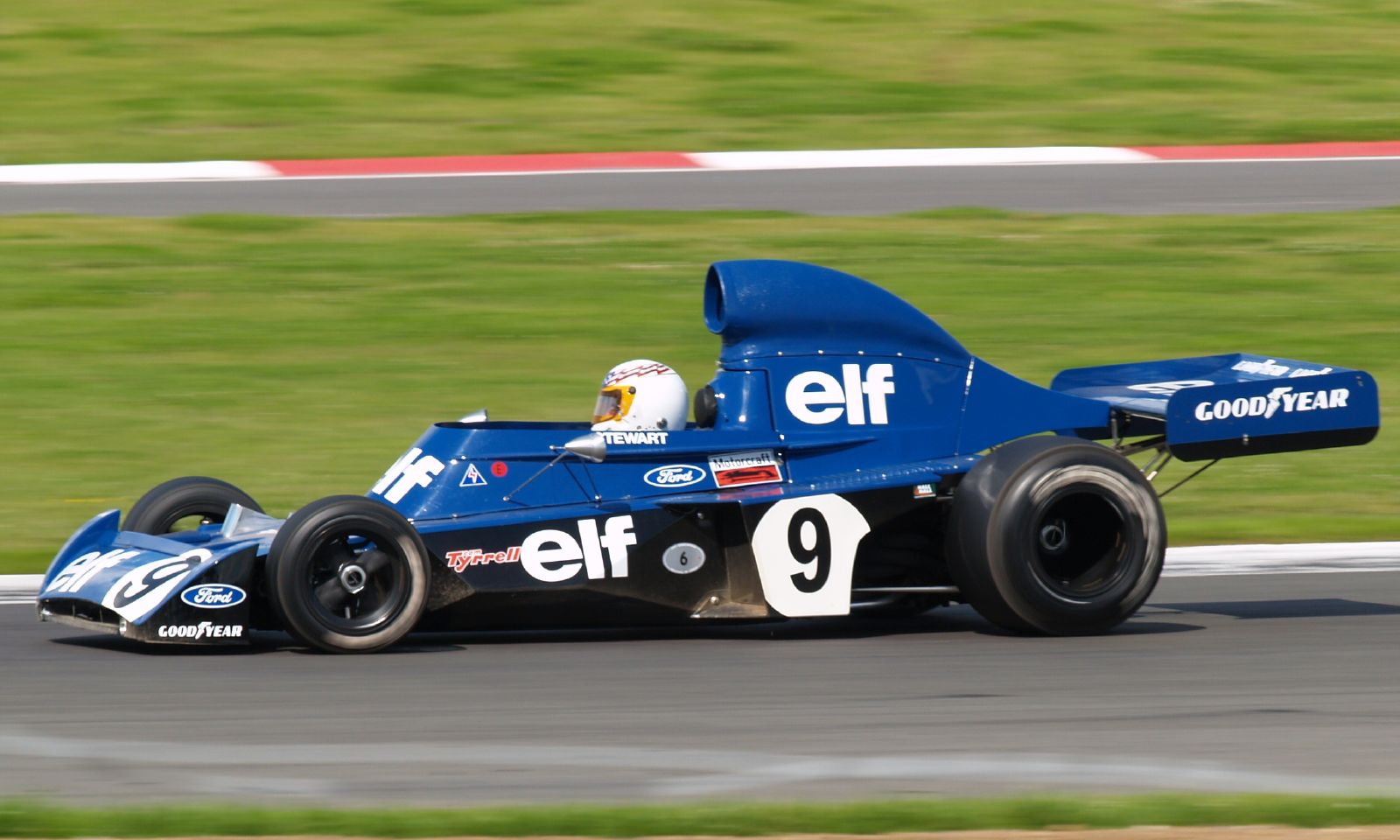
- The original Tyrrell 006, being driven by former owner John Delane in 2007
- Category: Formula One
- Constructor: Tyrrell Racing Organisation
- Designer: Derek Gardner
- Predecessor: Tyrrell 005
- Successor: Tyrrell 007

Technical specifications
- Chassis: Aluminium monocoque
- Suspension (front): Double wishbones, coil springs
- Suspension (rear): Double wishbones, coil springs
- Engine: Ford-Cosworth DFV, 2,993 cc (182.6 cu in), 90° V8, Naturally aspirated, mid-mounted,
- Transmission: Hewland FG400 5-speed manual ZF differential
- Fuel: Elf
- Tyres: Goodyear

Competition history
- Notable entrants: Elf Team Tyrrell
- Notable drivers: (United Kingdom) Jackie Stewart (France) François Cevert (France) Patrick Depailler (South Africa) Jody Scheckter
- Debut: 1972 Canadian Grand Prix
Races	Wins	Poles	F/Laps
23	5	3	2
- Constructors' Championships: 0
- Drivers' Championships: 1 (1973)
- Unless otherwise stated, all data refer to Formula One World Championship Grands Prix only.

The Tyrrell 006 was a Formula One car designed and built by the Tyrrell Racing Organisation. It was introduced towards the end of 1972. In the hands of Jackie Stewart it won the Drivers' Championship for the 1973 Formula One season, Stewart's third and final title. The car was first raced at the 1972 Canadian Grand Prix with Stewart's teammate and protégé François Cevert at the wheel. The 006 was a very slightly reworked version of the preceding Tyrrell 005 car, but in contrast it was the first Tyrrell-built models to be replicated, the number 006 becoming a model- rather than chassis-number; previous Tyrrells were one-off constructions. In total there were three Tyrrell 006 chassis built: 006; 006/2; and 006/3. The 006 model was gradually phased out in the early part of the 1974 Formula One season as Tyrrell constructed the succeeding Tyrrell 007.

== Competition history ==
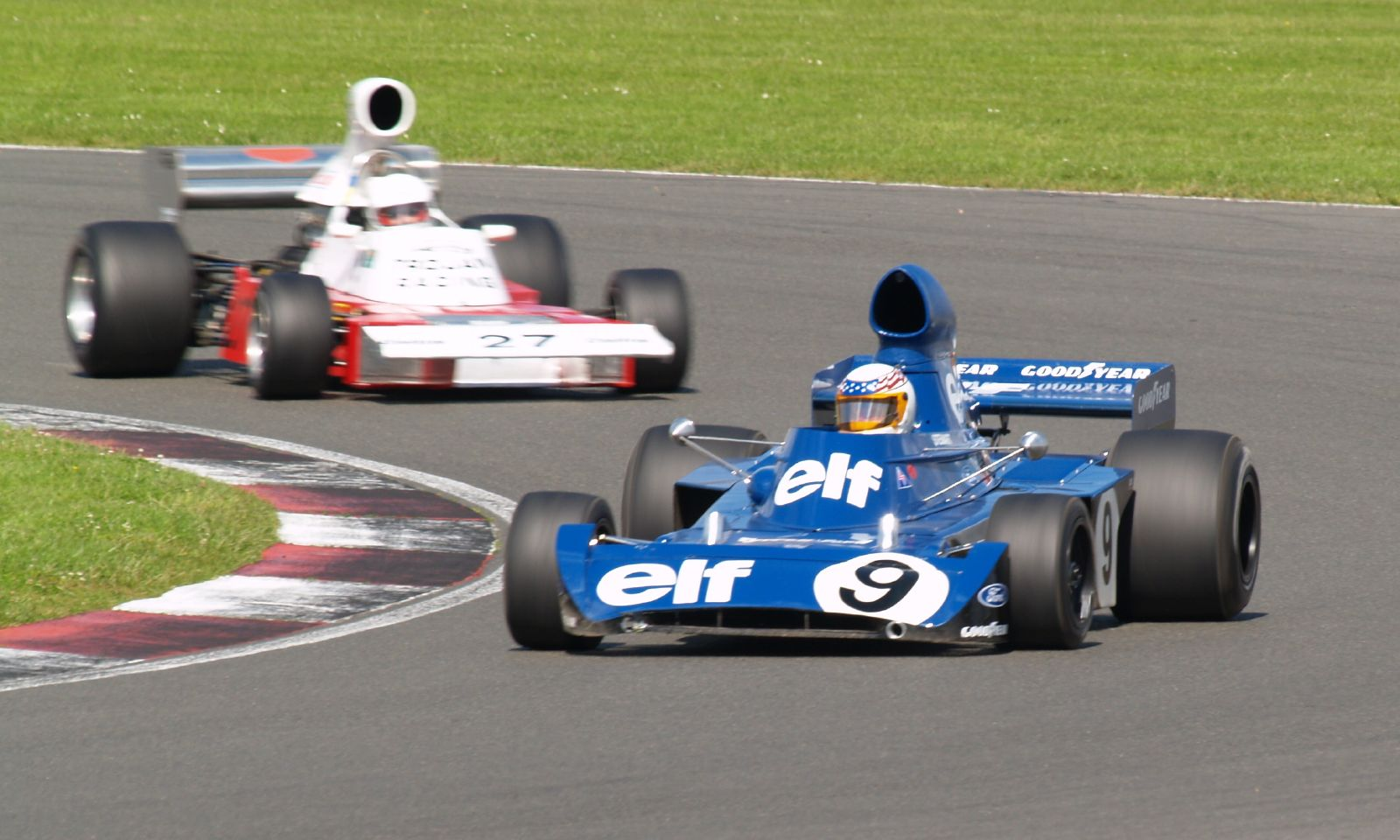
Tyrrell 006, driven by John Delane, leads a Trojan T103 at the 2007 Silverstone Classic meeting, July 2007

006 was built for Cevert to replace chassis 002, while the existing 005 was retained by Stewart for the final races of 1972. Stewart continued to use 005 for the first two races of 1973 while 006/2 was in construction and took 006 to the model's first win, at the 1973 South African Grand Prix. On the completion of 006/2, 005 was reduced to testing duties and was often seen in practice sessions adorned with experimental and copy-cat parts. The drivers retained their respective chassis for the majority of the remaining 1973 races, Stewart scoring five victories on his way to the Drivers' Championship title. Cevert also took several podium finishes, but the season was closely fought and Tyrrell (82 points) were beaten to the Constructors' title by Lotus (92pts). Cevert damaged 006 in a collision during the Canadian Grand Prix, and a new chassis, 006/3 was built up for his use in the following race. It was in 006/3's only ever appearance that Cevert was fatally injured, when he crashed during practice for the final race of the season: the 1973 United States Grand Prix. After Cevert's accident a devastated Stewart drove 006/2 around the Watkins Glen circuit once more, in an attempt to understand what had happened to Cevert, parked the car and then walked away from Formula One.

The surviving 006/2 was used for the early races of the 1974 Formula One season. Jody Scheckter drove it in Argentina, Brazil and South Africa and Patrick Depailler used 006/2 as a fall-back after qualifying breakdowns in Spain, Monaco and France. After France, Tyrrell retired the 006 model in favour of the newer 007.

== Survivors ==
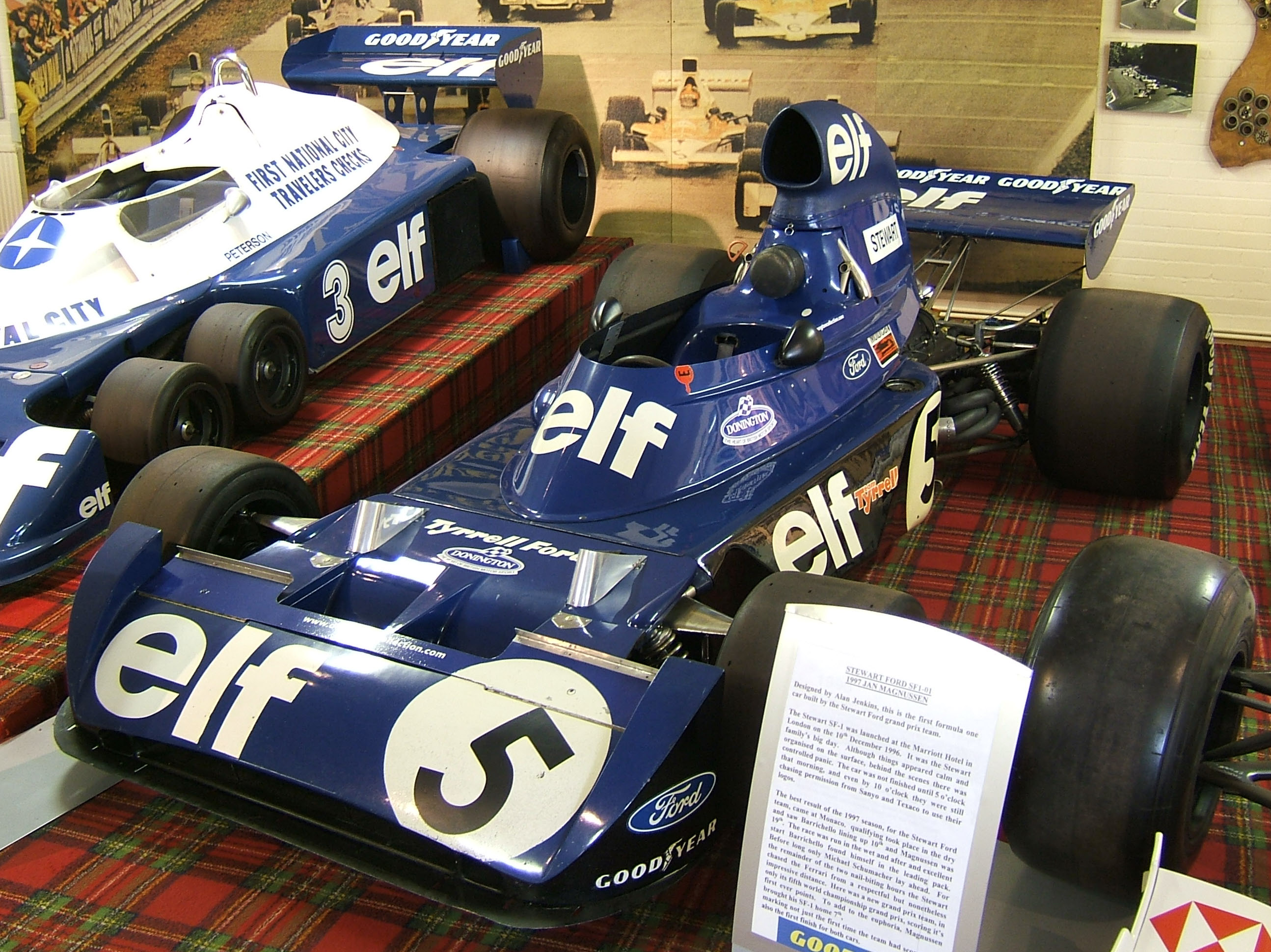
Jackie Stewart's final Grand Prix car, Tyrrell 006/2, resting on a carpet of Royal Stewart tartan in the Donington Grand Prix Collection.

Tyrrell 006/3 was written off and subsequently scrapped following Cevert's fatal accident in the car.

The original chassis, 006, was retained by Tyrrell for many years, but was eventually sold off in 1985. Since then it has spent time in multiple private collections, and was regularly raced in historic competitions during the late 2000s by John Delane.

After its retirement from active competition, Tom Wheatcroft bought 006/2 and displayed it in his Donington Grand Prix Exhibition for many years. Stewart subsequently bought 006/2 from the Wheatcroft estate, and he has driven it on a number of occasions, particularly at the Bahrain Grand Prix weekend and Goodwood Festival of Speed, both times in 2010.

== Complete Formula One World Championship results ==
(key)(results in bold indicate pole position, results in italics indicate fastest lap)

Year	Entrant	Driver	1	2	3	4	5	6	7	8	9	10	11	12	13	14	15	Points	WCC
1972	Elf Team Tyrrell		ARG	RSA	ESP	MON	BEL	FRA	GBR	GER	AUT	ITA	CAN	USA				**51**^{1}	2nd
1972	Elf Team Tyrrell	François Cevert											Ret	2				**51**^{1}	2nd
1973	Elf Team Tyrrell		ARG	BRA	RSA	ESP	BEL	MON	SWE	FRA	GBR	NED	GER	AUT	ITA	CAN	USA	**82**^{2}	2nd
1973	Elf Team Tyrrell	Jackie Stewart			1	Ret	1	**1**	5	**4**	10	1	**1**	2	4	5	DNS	**82**^{2}	2nd
1973	Elf Team Tyrrell	François Cevert	2	10		2	2	4	3	2	5	2	2	Ret	5	Ret	DNS	**82**^{2}	2nd
1974	Elf Team Tyrrell		ARG	BRA	RSA	ESP	BEL	MON	SWE	NED	FRA	GBR	GER	AUT	ITA	CAN	USA	**52**^{3}	3rd
1974	Elf Team Tyrrell	Jody Scheckter	Ret	13	8													**52**^{3}	3rd
1974	Elf Team Tyrrell	Patrick Depailler				8		9			8							**52**^{3}	3rd

^{1} 0 points were scored using the Tyrrell 006; all 51 points were scored using the Tyrrell 002, Tyrrell 003, Tyrrell 004 and Tyrrell 005

^{2} 76 points were scored using the Tyrrell 006; the other 6 points were scored using the Tyrrell 005

^{3} 0 points were scored using the Tyrrell 006; all 52 points were scored using the Tyrrell 005 and Tyrrell 007
