= Tyrrell 004 =

Formula One racing car

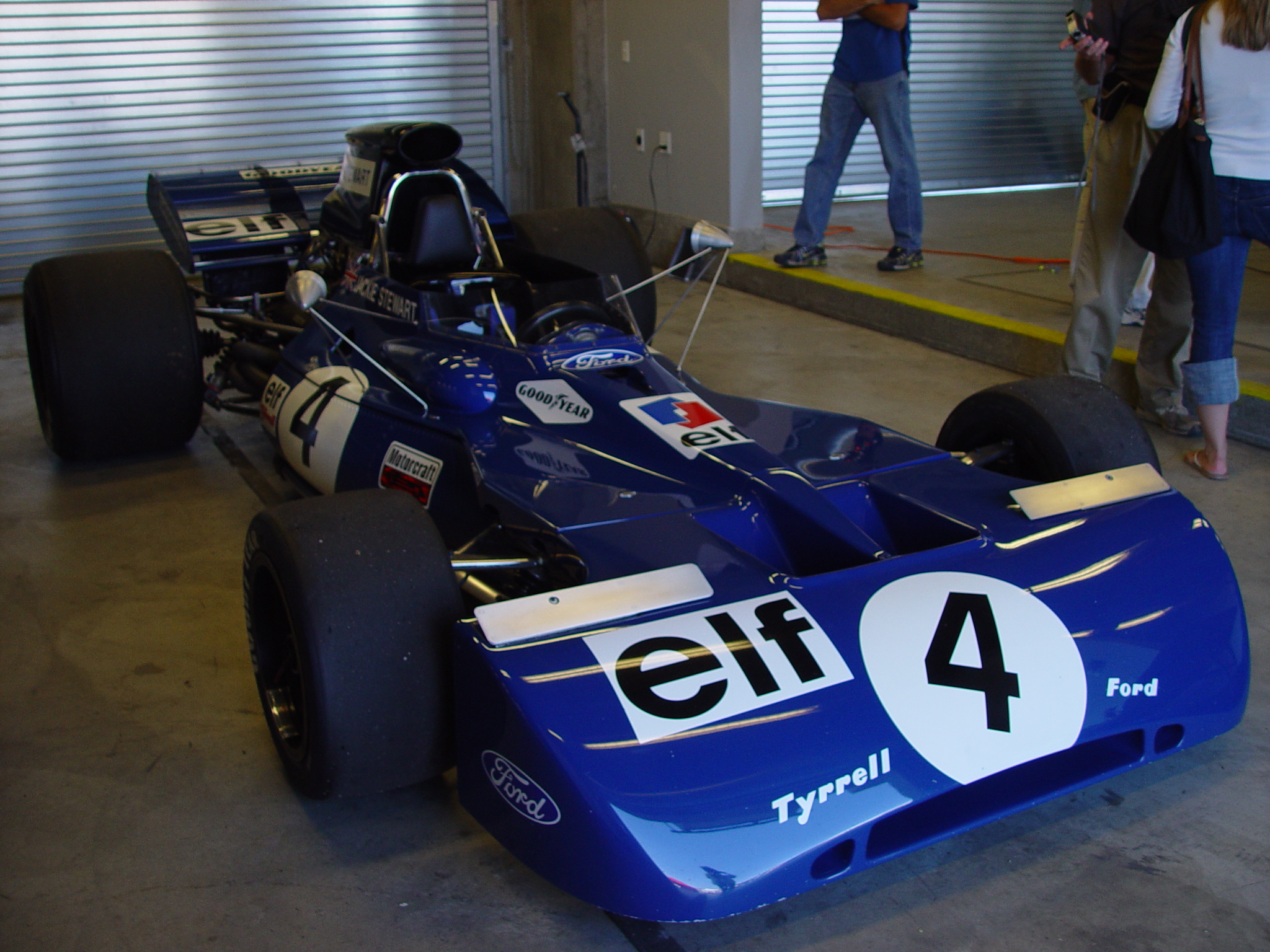
- Category: Formula One
- Constructor: Tyrrell Racing Organisation
- Designer(s): Derek Gardner
- Predecessor: 003
- Successor: 005

Technical specifications
- Chassis: Aluminium monocoque
- Suspension (front): Double wishbones, coil springs
- Suspension (rear): Double wishbones, coil springs
- Engine: Ford-Cosworth DFV, 2,993 cc (182.6 cu in), 90° V8, Naturally aspirated, mid-mounted,
- Transmission: Hewland FG400 5-speed manual
- Fuel: Elf
- Tyres: Goodyear (1972 with Tyrrell, 1973 with Lucky Strike Racing); Firestone (1974 with Blignaut Embassy Racing)

Competition history
- Notable entrants: Elf Team Tyrrell; Lucky Strike Racing; Blignaut Embassy Racing
- Notable drivers: (United Kingdom) Jackie Stewart (France) Patrick Depailler
- Debut: 1972 Monaco Grand Prix
Races	Wins	Poles	F/Laps
5	0	0	0
- Constructors' Championships: 0
- Drivers' Championships: 0
- n.b. Unless otherwise stated, all data refer to Formula One World Championship Grands Prix only.

The Tyrrell 004 is a Formula One racing car which was designed for the 1972 Formula One season by Tyrrell's Chief Designer, Derek Gardner. It is the fourth and final car built of the basic Tyrrell 001 design. The 004 was seen in five races, three with Tyrrell: Jackie Stewart drove the 004 in the Monaco Grand Prix to finish 4th; the Scotsman was also scheduled to drive it in the Belgian Grand Prix, but a stomach ulcer put him out of the race, and the team did not use a replacement driver. Patrick Depailler drove the 004 in the French Grand Prix and was not classified, and the Frenchman was given one more opportunity in the 004 for the United States Grand Prix and finished 7th.

The 004 was replaced by the Tyrrell 005, the first car of Gardner's new design. In 1973, 004 was sold to a South African team. Eddie Keizan was not classified in the 1973 South African Grand Prix and finished 14th in the 1974 South African Grand Prix. Keizan also drove the car in the South African Formula One Championship, recording two wins and nine second-place finishes in 1973 and 1974. The car is now owned by a collector in the United States, where it has been restored, and is driven in historic races.

== Complete Formula One World Championship results ==
(key)(results in bold indicate pole position, results in italics indicate fastest lap)

Year	Entrant	Driver	1	2	3	4	5	6	7	8	9	10	11	12	13	14	15	Points	WCC
1972	Elf Team Tyrrell		ARG	RSA	ESP	MON	BEL	FRA	GBR	GER	AUT	ITA	CAN	USA				**51**^{‡}	**2nd**
1972	Elf Team Tyrrell	(United Kingdom) Jackie Stewart				4												**51**^{‡}	**2nd**
1972	Elf Team Tyrrell	(France) Patrick Depailler						NC						7				**51**^{‡}	**2nd**
1973	Blignaut Lucky Strike Racing		ARG	BRA	RSA	ESP	BEL	MON	SWE	FRA	GBR	NED	GER	AUT	ITA	CAN	USA	—	—
1973	Blignaut Lucky Strike Racing	(South Africa) Eddie Keizan			NC													—	—
1974	Blignaut Embassy Racing		ARG	BRA	RSA	ESP	BEL	MON	SWE	NED	FRA	GBR	GER	AUT	ITA	CAN	USA	—	—
1974	Blignaut Embassy Racing	(South Africa) Eddie Keizan			14													—	—

^{‡} 3 points were scored using the Tyrrell 004; the other 48 points were scored using the Tyrrell 002, Tyrrell 003 and Tyrrell 005
