= Tyrrell 005 =

Formula One racing car

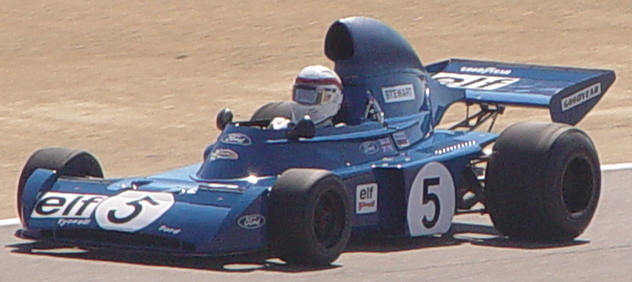
- Tyrrell 005 at Monterey in 2004
- Category: Formula One
- Constructor: Tyrrell Racing Organisation
- Designer: Derek Gardner
- Predecessor: 004
- Successor: 006

Technical specifications
- Chassis: Aluminium monocoque
- Suspension (front): Double wishbones, coil springs
- Suspension (rear): Double wishbones, coil springs
- Length: 146.0 in (370.8 cm)
- Height: 48.5 in (123.2 cm)
- Axle track: 63.0 in (160.0 cm) (front); 62.9 in (159.8 cm) (rear)
- Wheelbase: 94.05 in (238.9 cm)
- Engine: Ford-Cosworth DFV, 2,993 cc (182.6 cu in), 90° V8, Naturally aspirated, mid-mounted,
- Transmission: Hewland FG400 5-speed manual
- Weight: 1,267 lb (574.7 kg)
- Fuel: Elf
- Brakes: Inboard ventilated disc (front and rear)
- Tyres: Goodyear

Competition history
- Notable entrants: Elf Team Tyrrell
- Notable drivers: (United Kingdom) Jackie Stewart (France) François Cevert (France) Patrick Depailler
- Debut: 1972 Austrian Grand Prix
- First win: 1972 Canadian Grand Prix
- Last win: 1972 United States Grand Prix
- Last event: 1974 South African Grand Prix
Races	Wins	Poles	F/Laps
11	2	1	2
- Constructors' Championships: 0
- Drivers' Championships: 1 (1973)
- Unless otherwise stated, all data refer to Formula One World Championship Grands Prix only.

The Tyrrell 005 is a Formula One racing car that was designed for the Tyrrell team by their Chief Designer, Derek Gardner. Jackie Stewart drove the 005 in the final four races of the 1972 Formula One season, and it was also used for selected races of the 1973 and the early part of the 1974 seasons. Only one chassis was built and Gardner designed it with a particularly short wheelbase of 94.05 in (238.9 cm) specifically to suit Stewart's style and abilities.

== Racing history ==
The 005's first race was the 1972 Austrian Grand Prix where Stewart finished seventh. Clutch failure put Stewart out of the race and out of the championship at the Italian Grand Prix. The Scotsman won the Canadian and United States Grands Prix.

Stewart raced the 005 at the 1973 Argentine Grand Prix and finished third. The Scotsman finished 2nd in the Brazilian Grand Prix. François Cevert drove the 005 in the South African Grand Prix and was not classified. Chris Amon raced the 005 at the Canadian Grand Prix and finished 10th. Amon was scheduled to drive the 005 in the United States Grand Prix but he and Stewart withdrew after the death of Cevert during practice.

The 005 was used in the first three races of 1974 by Frenchman Patrick Depailler who finished 6th in the Argentine Grand Prix. Depailler finished 8th in the Brazilian Grand Prix and the 005's final race was the South African Grand Prix when the Frenchman finished fourth. The 005 was replaced by the Tyrrell 006.

== Complete Formula One World Championship results ==
(key)(results in bold indicate pole position, results in italics indicate fastest lap)

Year	Entrant	Driver	1	2	3	4	5	6	7	8	9	10	11	12	13	14	15	Points	WCC
1972	Elf Team Tyrrell		ARG	RSA	ESP	MON	BEL	FRA	GBR	GER	AUT	ITA	CAN	USA				**51**^{1}	2nd
1972	Elf Team Tyrrell	François Cevert						PO										**51**^{1}	2nd
1972	Elf Team Tyrrell	Jackie Stewart							PO		7	Ret	1	**1**				**51**^{1}	2nd
1973	Elf Team Tyrrell		ARG	BRA	RSA	ESP	BEL	MON	SWE	FRA	GBR	NED	GER	AUT	ITA	CAN	USA	**82**^{2}	2nd
1973	Elf Team Tyrrell	Jackie Stewart	3	2														**82**^{2}	2nd
1973	Elf Team Tyrrell	François Cevert			NC													**82**^{2}	2nd
1973	Elf Team Tyrrell	Chris Amon														10	DNS	**82**^{2}	2nd
1974	Elf Team Tyrrell		ARG	BRA	RSA	ESP	MON	BEL	SWE	NED	FRA	GBR	GER	AUT	ITA	CAN	USA	**52**^{3}	3rd
1974	Elf Team Tyrrell	Patrick Depailler	6	8	4													**52**^{3}	3rd

^{1} 18 points were scored using the Tyrrell 005; the other 33 points were scored using the Tyrrell 002, Tyrrell 003 and Tyrrell 004
^{2} 6 points were scored using the Tyrrell 005; the other 76 points were scored using the Tyrrell 006
^{3} 4 points were scored using the Tyrrell 005; the other 48 points were scored using the Tyrrell 007
