= Ken Tyrrell =

British racing driver and team owner (1924–2001)

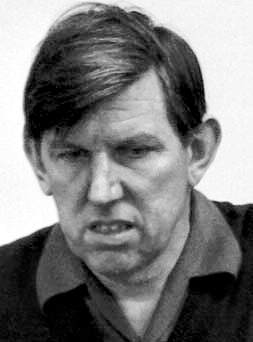
- Tyrrell at the 1971 Monaco Grand Prix
- Born: Robert Kenneth "Ken" Tyrrell; 3 May 1924; East Horsley, Surrey, England
- Died: 25 August 2001 (aged 77)
- Occupation: Founder of Tyrrell Racing
- Spouse: Nora Isobel Tyrrell
- Children: 2

Robert Kenneth Tyrrell (3 May 1924 – 25 August 2001) was a British Formula Two racing driver and the founder of the Tyrrell Formula One constructor.

== Biography ==
Born in East Horsley, Surrey, Tyrrell served in the Royal Air Force during World War II. After the war he became a timber merchant; as a result, he was sometimes known as "Chopper". In 1952, at 28, he began racing a Norton-powered Cooper in 500 cc (31 cu in) Formula 3. In 1958, he advanced to Formula Two in a Cooper-Climax, joining Cecil Libowitz and Alan Brown. He achieved a number of good placings and the occasional win.

Realising, however, that he was not going to reach the top and recognising that his talents were better suited to team management, Tyrrell stood down as a driver in 1959 and began to run the works Cooper Formula Junior team, using the woodshed owned by his family business, Tyrrell Brothers, as a workshop. By 1961, he was also managing the Mini Coopers, as well as deputising for an injured John Cooper in Formula One.

Tyrrell was responsible for discovering Jackie Stewart, whom he contracted to race for his Formula Junior team, after a test in 1964. Along with numerous lesser lights, he also approved Jody Scheckter and motorcycle racing ace John Surtees. Recognizing the value of the new Cosworth DFV, after a Lotus win at Zandvoort in its debut in 1967, with financial help from Elf, Dunlop and Ford, Tyrrell achieved his dream of moving to Formula 1 in 1968, as team principal for Matra International, a joint-venture established between Tyrrell's own team and the French auto manufacturer Matra. He persuaded Matra that a DFV was good insurance against the possible failure of Matra's V12 and thus the Matra MS10 was the result.

Stewart helped the new team to place second in the Constructors' Championship for 1968. The success led to Matra's Gérard Ducarouge and Bernard Boyer creating the DFV-powered Matra MS80 for 1969, driven by Jean-Pierre Beltoise and Stewart, who won his first World Drivers Championship. Matra insisted on focusing on their V12, leading Tyrrell to secretly employ Derek Gardner, then at Ferguson (whom he had encountered in trials with a four-wheel drive Matra) to build what became the Tyrrell 001. It was quick, if a trifle unreliable, and spawned the much better Tyrrell 003 for 1971. This, in the hands of Stewart and newly hired François Cevert, took eight wins during 1971 and 1972 and gave Stewart the 1971 World Drivers' Championship.

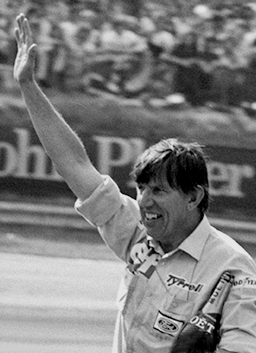
Tyrrell in 1971

For 1972, Gardner tried inboard brakes on the 005 but proved unable to work out their problems.

During his early years in F1, "Uncle" Ken, as he was often known, reached the peak of his career. The 006, with its tall airbox, appeared in 1973 and was better than the 005. However, Tyrrell was profoundly affected by the death of Cevert in practice for the 1973 US Grand Prix, leading to Stewart announcing his retirement, the World Championship already his.

With the death of Cevert and the departure of Stewart, Tyrrell in 1974 hired Scheckter and Patrick Depailler and Gardner designed the less-twitchy 007. It was good enough for Scheckter to place third in the World Championship and for Depailler to be ninth in his rookie season and for the team to continue to campaign the car during 1975. In the following years, the Tyrrell team slipped down the rankings to mid-field, despite having employed natural talents such as Scheckter, Depailler and Ronnie Peterson, as well as lesser lights like Jean-Pierre Jabouille, in a third 007 in 1975.

Still, Tyrrell found the time to introduce new concepts for F1. In 1976, the Tyrrell team created the six-wheeled P34, with four front wheels. The Gardner-designed single-seater achieved a race victory but it was abandoned after Goodyear refused to develop the small tyres needed exclusively for the car as it would detract from the efforts in the ongoing tyre war with other tyre manufacturers.

In the early 1980s, Tyrrell's fortunes declined to the point where he had to run his team without sponsorship. Tyrrell still retained his eye for talent, bringing Michele Alboreto, Stefan Bellof and Martin Brundle to F1, but was not able to retain them. Without the proper funding, Tyrrell was the only entrant with the Cosworth DFV at a time when all other teams had switched to turbocharged engines. Alboreto scored the engine's last win in 1983, but in 1984 the team was excluded from the championship after being found to have run underweight cars before adding ballast during pit stops. Tyrrell denied this and felt his team was being singled out for refusing to run more expensive turbos.

In the early 1990s, Tyrrell relinquished much of the company's control to his sons and to Harvey Postlethwaite, who was the first to introduce the high-nose concept in the 1990 Tyrrell. Jean Alesi scored two-second places in the car and the team led a lap for the last time. Their final podium finish was in 1994 with Mark Blundell and their final points at the 1997 Monaco Grand Prix, with fifth position from Mika Salo.

In 1997, the Tyrrell F1 team was bought by British American Tobacco and Craig Pollock to create British American Racing. Tyrrell did not stay with the team for its last year under the Tyrrell name (1998), after Pollock insisted on hiring Ricardo Rosset, whom Tyrrell regarded as less capable than the also-available Jos Verstappen. Tyrrell also approached Norberto Fontana and had even drafted a contract, but this was also vetoed by British American Racing.

On 25 August 2001, Tyrrell died of pancreatic cancer at the age of 77.

== Sources ==
- Kettlewell, Mike. "Stewart: The Flying Scotsman", in Northey, Tom, ed. World of Automobiles, Vol. 19, pp. 2190–2. London: Orbis, 1974.
- Setright, L. J. K. "Tyrrell: A Shrewd Talent-spotter", in Northey, Tom, ed. World of Automobiles, Vol. 21, pp. 2417–20. London: Orbis, 1974.
- Twite, Mike. "BRM: High Hopes and Heartbreak", in Northey, Tom, ed. World of Automobiles, Vol. 3, pp. 246–51. London: Orbis, 1974.

== Bibliography ==
- Hilton, Christopher (2002). Ken Tyrrell. Portrait of a motor racing giant. Sparkford: Haynes Publishing. ISBN 1-85960-885-X.
- Hamilton, Maurice (2002). Ken Tyrrell. The authorized biography. Collins Willow. ISBN 0-00-714376-1.

Sporting positions
Preceded by Lord Hesketh	BRDC President; 2000	Succeeded by Jackie Stewart
