= Tyrrell 003 =

Formula One racing car

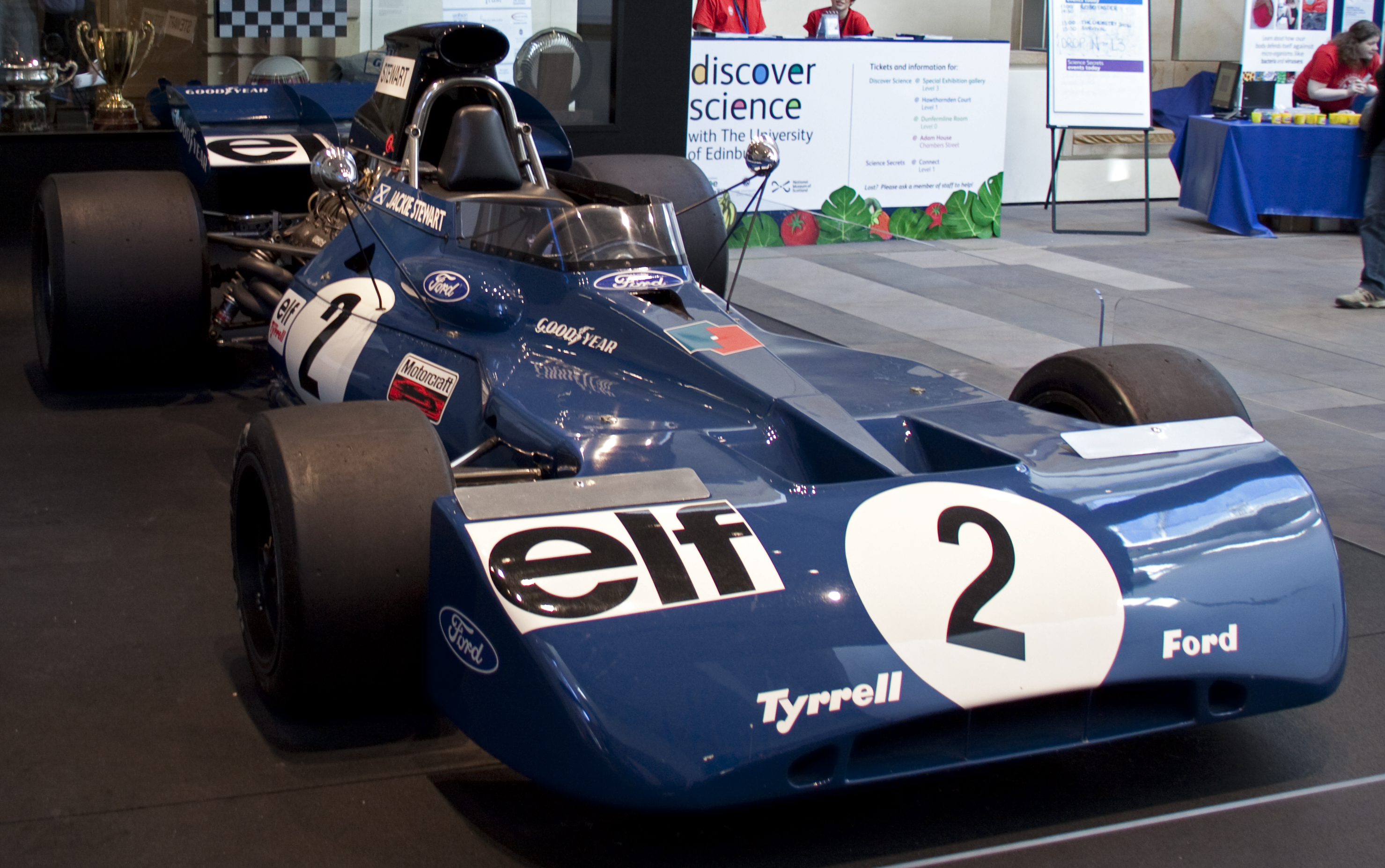
- Tyrrell 003
- Category: Formula One
- Constructor: Tyrrell Racing Organisation
- Designer: Derek Gardner
- Predecessor: 002
- Successor: 004

Technical specifications
- Chassis: Aluminium monocoque
- Suspension (front): Double wishbones, coil springs
- Suspension (rear): Double wishbones, coil springs
- Engine: Ford-Cosworth DFV, 2,993 cc (182.6 cu in), 90° V8, Naturally aspirated, mid-mounted,
- Transmission: Hewland FG400 5-speed manual
- Fuel: Elf
- Tyres: Goodyear

Competition history
- Notable entrants: Elf Team Tyrrell
- Notable drivers: (United Kingdom) Jackie Stewart
- Debut: 1971 Spanish Grand Prix
Races	Wins	Poles	F/Laps
16	8	6	5
- Constructors' Championships: 1 (1971)
- Drivers' Championships: 1 (1971)
- Unless otherwise stated, all data refer to Formula One World Championship Grands Prix only.

The Tyrrell 003 is a Formula One (F1) racing car which was designed by Tyrrell's chief designer, Derek Gardner and used in the 1971 and 1972 F1 seasons. It was driven by Jackie Stewart to the 1971 World Drivers' Championship.

The 003 was effectively the same as the Tyrrell 001 with a redesigned nose section, longer wheelbase, and a narrower monocoque.

== Conception ==
When Ken Tyrrell, the team's owner, became disenchanted with the poor performance of the March chassis during the 1970 season, he decided he would design and build his own car. He employed Derek Gardner to design it in secret at his own house. The project, codenamed "SP", which meant "Special Project", cost Tyrrell over £22,000 of his own money. The resulting car named Tyrrell 001 made its debut at Oulton Park in a non-championship race.

After the season had finished, Gardner redesigned some sections of the car, altering the airbox, remodelling the nose section, lengthening the wheelbase and slightly narrowing the monocoque. The redesigned car became known as the 002 and 003, which were chassis numbers given to each of the cars made for the 1971 season. The team also switched tyre supplier to Goodyear after Dunlop withdrew from F1.

== Competition ==
Driven by Jackie Stewart, it debuted at the 1971 Spanish Grand Prix and won at the first attempt. Tyrrell and Stewart took advantage as Lotus and Ferrari struggled during 1971; they won six races with Stewart claiming his second World Championship. Stewart and team mate François Cevert used different chassis throughout both 1971 and 1972 accommodating their different heights, with the shorter Stewart using 003 and the taller Cevert competing with the Tyrrell 002. New front bodywork debuted on Stewart's 003 for the French Grand Prix, and this bodywork was put on Cevert's 002 for the following Grand Prix in Britain.

The 1972 season saw Lotus back in form with Emerson Fittipaldi challenging Stewart for the championship. The Tyrrell 003 was not a match for the developed Lotus 72 and the Tyrrell team only won when the 72 failed to finish. Fittipaldi won the title that season by a comfortable margin. Despite scoring two wins with Stewart during 1972 (he also won two races with the new 005), the 003 had come to the end of its racing life. Tyrrell 003 remains the Tyrrell team's most successful chassis.

The vehicle is currently on display at the National Museum of Scotland, Edinburgh.

The Tyrrell 003 was replaced by 005 for 1973.

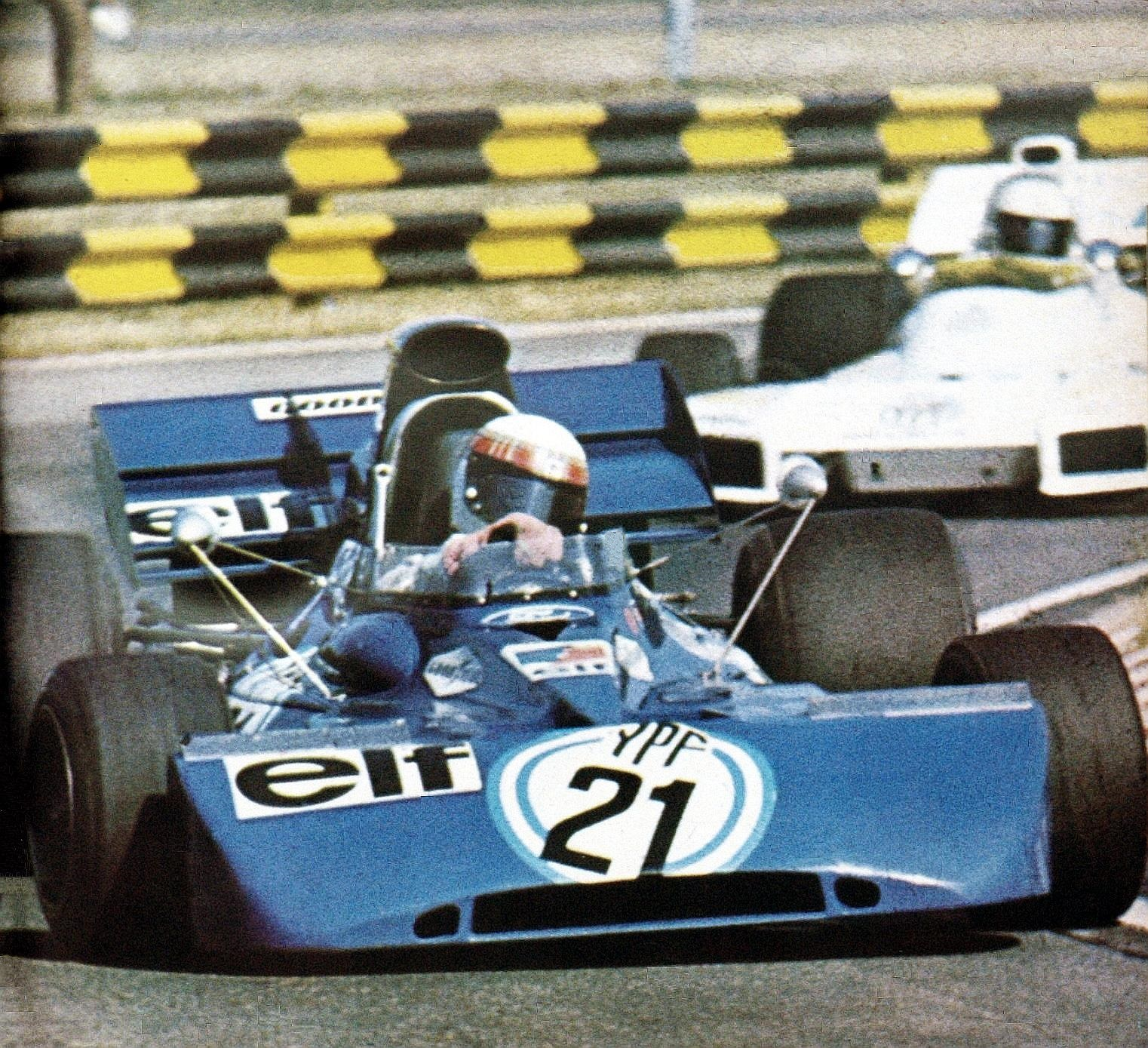
Jackie Stewart driving the 003 at the 1972 Argentine Grand Prix

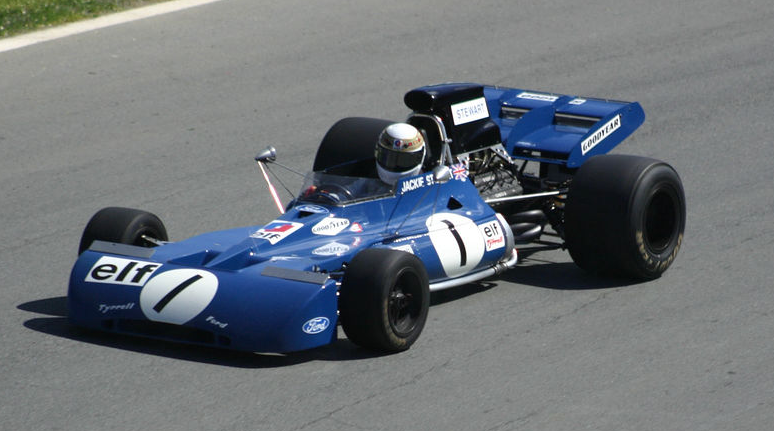
The Tyrrell 003 at Canada in 2004

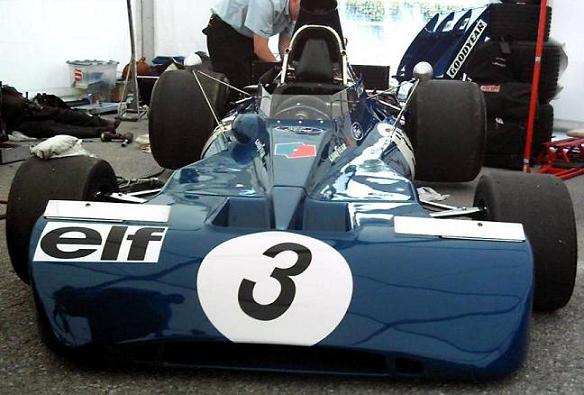
Tyrrell 003

== Complete Formula One World Championship results ==
(key)(results in bold indicate pole position, results in italics indicate fastest lap)

Year	Entrant	Driver	1	2	3	4	5	6	7	8	9	10	11	12	Points	WCC
1971	Elf Team Tyrrell		RSA	ESP	MON	NED	FRA	GBR	GER	AUT	ITA	CAN	USA		**73**^{†}	**1st**
1971	Elf Team Tyrrell	(United Kingdom) Jackie Stewart		1	**1**	11	**1**	1	**1**	Ret	Ret	**1**	**5**		**73**^{†}	**1st**
1972	Elf Team Tyrrell		ARG	RSA	ESP	MON	BEL	FRA	GBR	GER	AUT	ITA	CAN	USA	**51**^{‡}	**2nd**
1972	Elf Team Tyrrell	(United Kingdom) Jackie Stewart	1	**Ret**	Ret			1	2	11					**51**^{‡}	**2nd**

^{†} 54 points were scored using the Tyrrell 003; the other 19 points were scored using the Tyrrell 001 and Tyrrell 002

^{‡} 24 points were scored using the Tyrrell 003; the other 27 points were scored using the Tyrrell 002, Tyrrell 004 and Tyrrell 005
