= Tyrrell 002 =

Formula One racing car

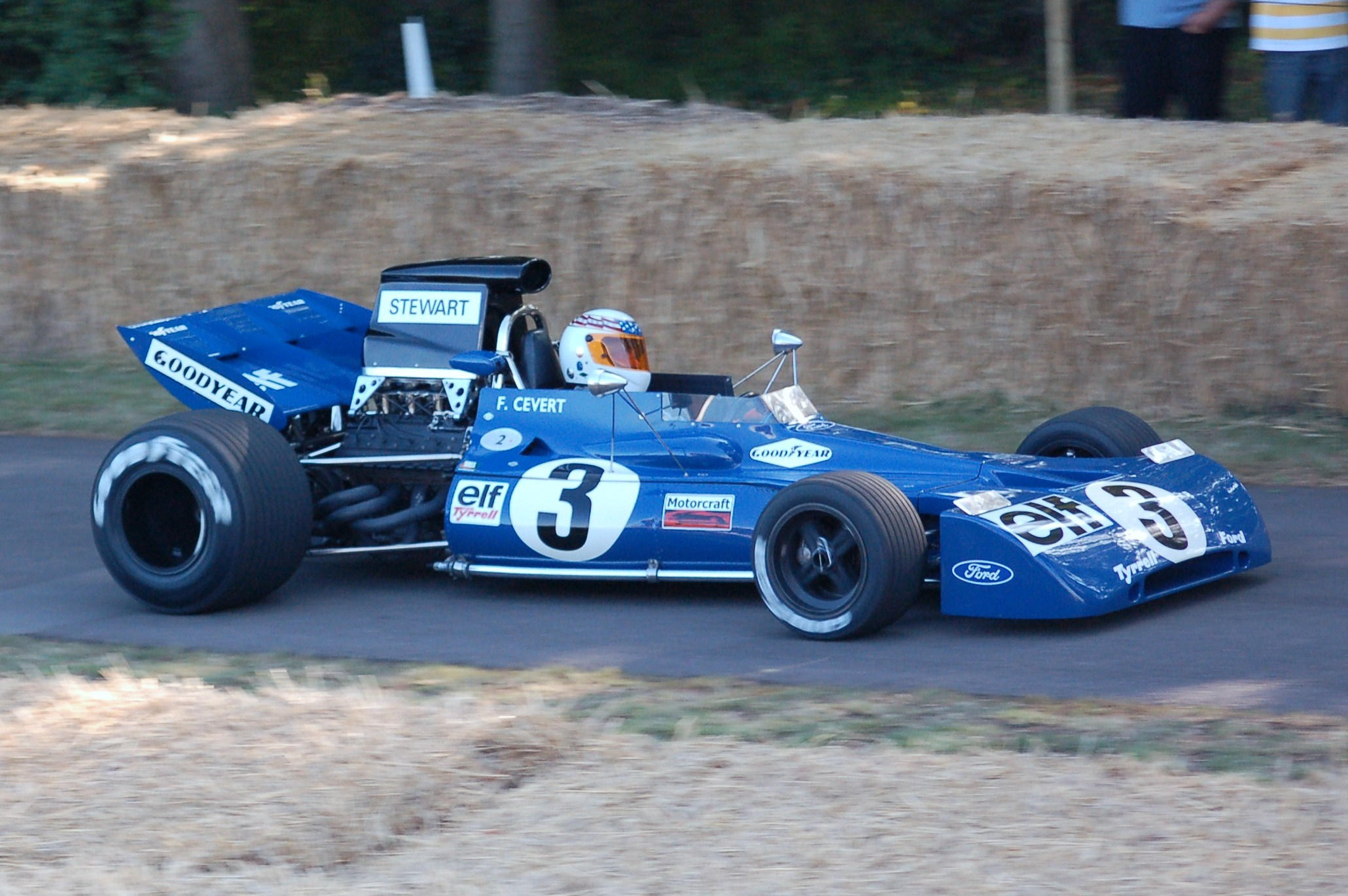
- Tyrrell 002 at Goodwood in 2009
- Category: Formula One
- Constructor: Tyrrell Racing Organisation
- Designer(s): Derek Gardner
- Predecessor: 001
- Successor: 003

Technical specifications
- Chassis: Aluminium monocoque
- Suspension (front): Double wishbones, coil springs
- Suspension (rear): Double wishbones, coil springs
- Engine: Ford-Cosworth DFV, 2,993 cc (182.6 cu in), 90° V8, Naturally aspirated, mid-mounted,
- Transmission: Hewland FG400 5-speed manual
- Fuel: Elf
- Tyres: Goodyear

Competition history
- Notable entrants: Elf Team Tyrrell
- Notable drivers: (France) François Cevert
Races	Wins	Poles	F/Laps
21	1	0	1
- Constructors' Championships: 1 (1971)
- Drivers' Championships: 0
- n.b. Unless otherwise stated, all data refer to Formula One World Championship Grands Prix only.

The Tyrrell 002 is a Formula One racing car which was designed for the 1971 and 1972 Formula One seasons by Tyrrell's Chief Designer, Derek Gardner. It was essentially the same design as the Tyrrell 001, but incorporated some detail changes, and 002 (and 003 and 004) were built with longer monocoques, as François Cevert was taller than Jackie Stewart.

== Competition history ==
=== 1971 ===
François Cevert drove every race of the 1971 season in the 002. The first race for the 002 was the 1971 South African Grand Prix when Cevert retired through accident. The Spanish Grand Prix saw the Frenchman finish outside the points in 7th. Cevert retired with a further two accidents at the Monaco and Dutch Grands Prix. The French Grand Prix saw the Frenchman at his home race finish 2nd to team-mate Jackie Stewart, The British Grand Prix saw Cevert 10th. The German Grand Prix saw the Frenchman finish 2nd to Stewart. An engine failure for the Frenchman at the Austrian Grand Prix. The Italian Grand Prix saw Cevert finish third in the closest finish ever with Peter Gethin, Ronnie Peterson, Mike Hailwood and Howden Ganley. The Canadian Grand Prix saw the race stopped after 64 laps due to the weather and Cevert finished 6th. The United States Grand Prix saw Cevert's only win when Stewart's tyres began to go off and the gap closed. The Scot realised that Cevert's Goodyears were holding up much better in the heat, and when Cevert closed up right behind him, he waved him by on lap 14. Denny Hulme, in third place, was now struggling with a terrible vibration in his tyres and was passed, first by Jacky Ickx, then Clay Regazzoni and Jo Siffert. By the time Ickx could get around Stewart on lap 17, Cevert's lead was 5.7 seconds. At about half-distance, Cevert began to struggle with the same understeer that had plagued Stewart much earlier. Ickx was closing, and his Firestones were getting better as the race went on. On lap 43, the Belgian set the fastest lap of the race, and the gap was down to 2.2 seconds. Then, on lap 49, the Ferrari's alternator fell off, punching a hole in the gearbox and spilling oil all over the track. Hulme hit the oil and spun into the barrier, bending his front suspension. He was standing beside the track when Cevert came by and also hit the barrier, but kept going, now 29 seconds in the lead. Cevert coasted home, taking both hands off the wheel to wave as he crossed the line. After taking the chequered flag, Cevert gave a nod to his teammate. "I feel pretty good with a $50,000 win. I followed Stewart in the beginning and was flagged on ahead. Jackie Stewart is a very sensible driver and a very good teacher. He let me go through." While it was the first race on the expanded Watkins Glen track, it was Cevert's first and only victory- at the circuit where he would be killed at 2 years later.

=== 1972 ===
Cevert had a bad start to the 1972 season with a gearbox failure in the Argentine Grand Prix, The Frenchman finished 9th in the South African Grand Prix. An ignition failure in the Spanish Grand Prix and not classified in the Monaco Grand Prix put the Frenchman at a low. Tyrrell only entered Cevert for the Belgian Grand Prix as Jackie Stewart was suffering from a stomach ulcer, Cervert finished 2nd to Emerson Fittipaldi's Lotus. Cevert drove and crashed the new Tyrrell 006 in practice for his home race, The French Grand Prix. He was forced to drive the 002 and finished 4th. The Frenchman spun off at the British Grand Prix but Ronnie Peterson's March suffered an engine failure with less than two laps to go, and crashed into the parked cars of Cevert's Tyrrell and Graham Hill's Brabham. Cevert finished 10th in the German Grand Prix and 9th in the Austrian Grand Prix. The Italian Grand Prix saw Cevert's engine fail and it was the 002's final race as it was replaced by the Tyrrell 006 for the Canadian Grand Prix.

=== Historic racing ===
The car was later used to win the 2011 Historic Formula One Championship.

== Complete Formula One World Championship results ==
(key)(results in bold indicate pole position, results in italics indicate fastest lap)

Year	Entrant	Driver	1	2	3	4	5	6	7	8	9	10	11	12	Points	WCC
1971	Elf Team Tyrrell		RSA	ESP	MON	NED	FRA	GBR	GER	AUT	ITA	CAN	USA		**73**^{1}	**1st**
1971	Elf Team Tyrrell	(France) François Cevert	Ret	7	Ret	Ret	2	10	2	Ret	3	6	1		**73**^{1}	**1st**
1972	Elf Team Tyrrell		ARG	RSA	ESP	MON	BEL	FRA	GBR	GER	AUT	ITA	CAN	USA	**51**^{2}	**2nd**
1972	Elf Team Tyrrell	(France) François Cevert	Ret	9	Ret	NC	2	4	Ret	10	9	Ret			**51**^{2}	**2nd**

^{1} 13 points were scored using the Tyrrell 002; the other 60 points were scored using the Tyrrell 001 and Tyrrell 003

^{2} 6 points were scored using the Tyrrell 002; the other 45 points were scored using the Tyrrell 003, Tyrrell 004 and Tyrrell 005
