= One by One (1975 film) =

1975 film

- Poster with the film's original title: One by One
- Directed by: Claude Du Boc
- Written by: John Crowley
- Produced by: Pete Leavell
- Starring: Stacy Keach; Jackie Stewart; Niki Lauda
- Narrated by: Stacy Keach
- Cinematography: Jacques Kargayan
- Edited by: Jean Kargayan; Pierre Jalbert
- Music by: Stomu Yamash'ta
- Distributed by: Trans-International Films
- Release dates: 1975 (One by One); 1978 (The Quick and the Dead)
- Running time: 100 minutes (One by One); 88 minutes (The Quick and the Dead)
- Country: United States
- Language: English

One by One (reissued in edited form as The Quick and the Dead in 1978) is a documentary about the deadliness of Grand Prix racing, including footage of fatal racing accidents. It is narrated by Stacy Keach.

The film was reissued as The Quick and the Dead in 1978 including the death of Tom Pryce at the 1977 South African Grand Prix. and was later released also as Champions Forever: The Formula One Drivers.

== Plot ==
The film begins by showing the speed, glamour, and intensity of Formula 1 in the early 1970s. The drivers preparing in the paddock, cars being tuned, crowds and excitement, and It sets the tone: Formula One is beautiful, but also dangerous. François Cevert died in a racing accident during qualifying for the 1973 United States Grand Prix at Watkins Glen. While driving through the fast, uphill Esses section of the track, his Tyrrell car went off the road, hit the right-hand barrier, and was sent back across the track where it hit the left-hand barrier upside down.

In the next scene, Roger Williamson died in 1973 Dutch Grand Prix Race. His car overturned and caught fire, and he could not escape in time even though another driver (David Purley) tried to help. Peter Revson died in a testing accident while preparing for a race in South Africa. His mechanical failure led to a sudden crash. In 1974 United States Grand Prix, Helmut Koinigg, crashed during the race. His car went into the barriers at low speed, but the barrier failed to protect him properly due to poor installation. Jochen Rindt died while in Monza practice in 1970. His brake failure caused a sudden collision. Mark Donohue in 1975 Austrian Grand Prix, he died from a cerebral hemorrhage (brain hemorrhage) that resulted from a high-speed crash during a practice session. And then later passed away in the hospital from complications. In the end, the final scenes look back at the drivers, the accidents (shown in non-graphic, documentary form), and the risks that were part of Formula 1 in the 1970s. The documentary focuses on the reality that several drivers featured in the film had died in real events around that time.

== Cast ==
- Jackie Stewart as Himself
- Niki Lauda as Himself
- Peter Revson as Himself
- François Cevert as Himself
- Mike Hailwood as Himself
- James Hunt as Himself
