= Tyrrell 001 =

Formula One racing car

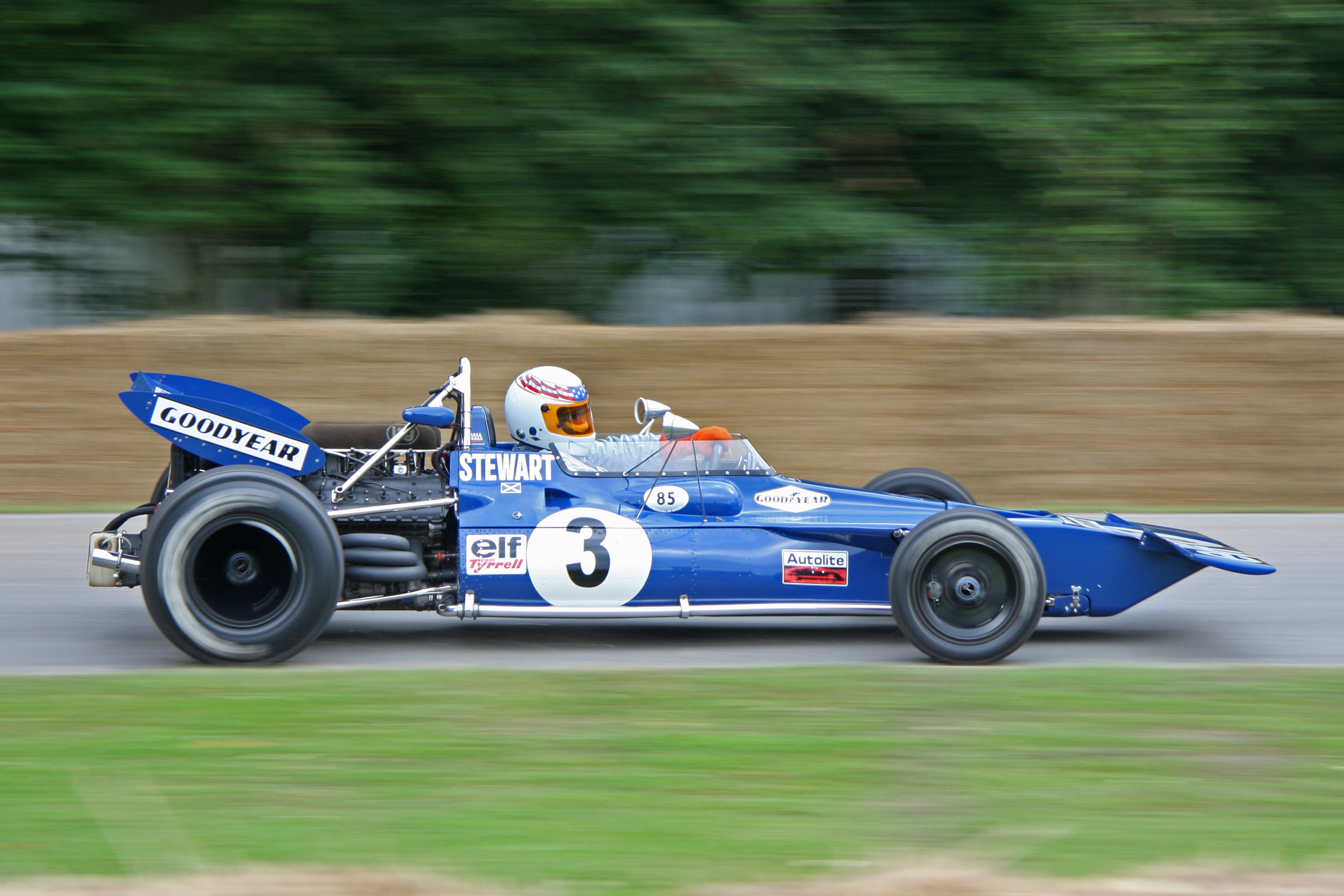
- Jackie Stewart's Tyrrell 001 being demonstrated at the 2008 Goodwood Festival of Speed.
- Category: Formula One
- Constructor: Tyrrell Racing Organisation
- Designer: Derek Gardner
- Successor: 002

Technical specifications
- Chassis: Aluminium monocoque
- Suspension (front): Double wishbones, coil springs
- Suspension (rear): Double wishbones, coil springs
- Engine: Ford-Cosworth DFV, 2,993 cc (182.6 cu in), 90° V8, Naturally aspirated, mid-mounted,
- Transmission: Hewland FG400 5-speed manual
- Fuel: Elf
- Tyres: Dunlop (1970); Goodyear (1971)

Competition history
- Notable entrants: Elf Team Tyrrell
- Notable drivers: (United Kingdom) Jackie Stewart (United States) Peter Revson
- Debut: 1970 Canadian Grand Prix
Races	Wins	Poles	F/Laps
5	0	2	0
- Constructors' Championships: 1 (1971)
- Drivers' Championships: 1 (1971)
- Unless otherwise stated, all data refer to Formula One World Championship Grands Prix only.

The Tyrrell 001 is a Formula One racing car which was designed by Tyrrell Racing's chief designer, Derek Gardner and used at the end of the 1970 and the beginning of the 1971 Formula One season. The car competed in five Grands Prix, retiring on four occasions and achieving one second-place finish.

== Development ==
When Ken Tyrrell, the team's owner, became disenchanted with the poor performance of March chassis during the 1970 season, he decided he would design and build his own car. He employed Derek Gardner to design it in secret at his own house. Tyrrell had run Matra chassis in 1969, but Matra's acquisition by Chrysler made continuing to use the preferred Ford Cosworth DFV engines with the Matra chassis impractical. The project, codenamed "SP" which meant "Special Project" cost Tyrrell over £22,000 of his own money.

== Racing history ==
=== 1970 ===
The resulting car made its debut at Oulton Park at a non-championship race but retired; the car was introduced too late in the season to make any difference in the championship; it competed in the final three rounds of the season in North America. Jackie Stewart took pole in the Canadian Grand Prix but retired with axle failure while leading, Stewart led again in the United States Grand Prix when the car suffered an oil leak. The Mexican Grand Prix was delayed due to the large crowd of 200,000 proving difficult to control, almost forcing the cancellation of the race. They were crammed in front of the guard-rails, sat at the trackside and ran across the track itself. Despite impassioned appeals from Stewart and local hero Pedro Rodríguez they still remained troublesome. Stewart had suspension failure caused by running over a dog.

=== 1971 ===
Stewart took pole in the South African Grand Prix but finished 2nd to Mario Andretti's Ferrari, Stewart raced the Tyrrell 003 for the remainder of the season. Peter Revson drove the 001's final race in the United States Grand Prix but retired with clutch failure.

== Gallery ==
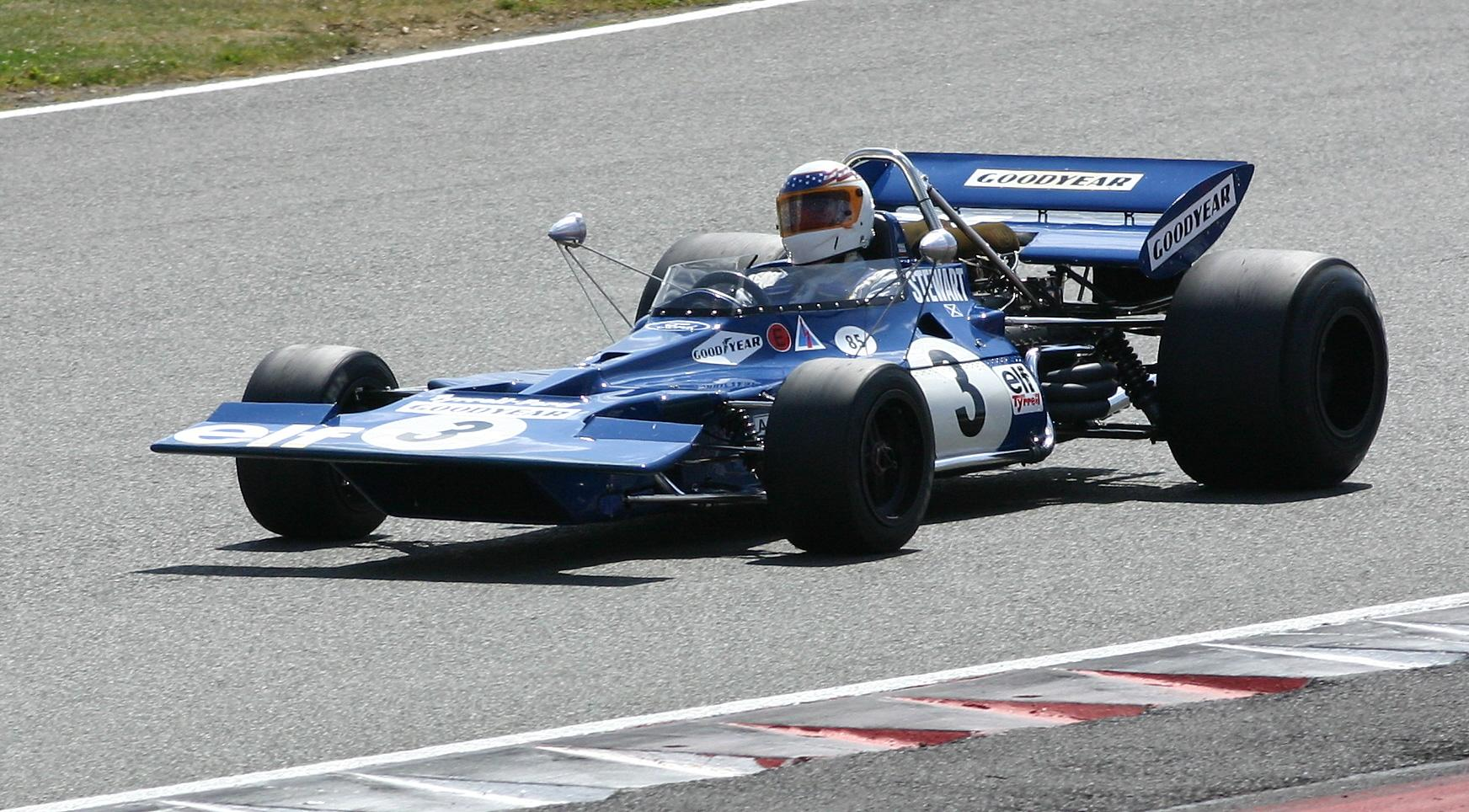
Tyrrell 001 at the 2008 Silverstone Classic

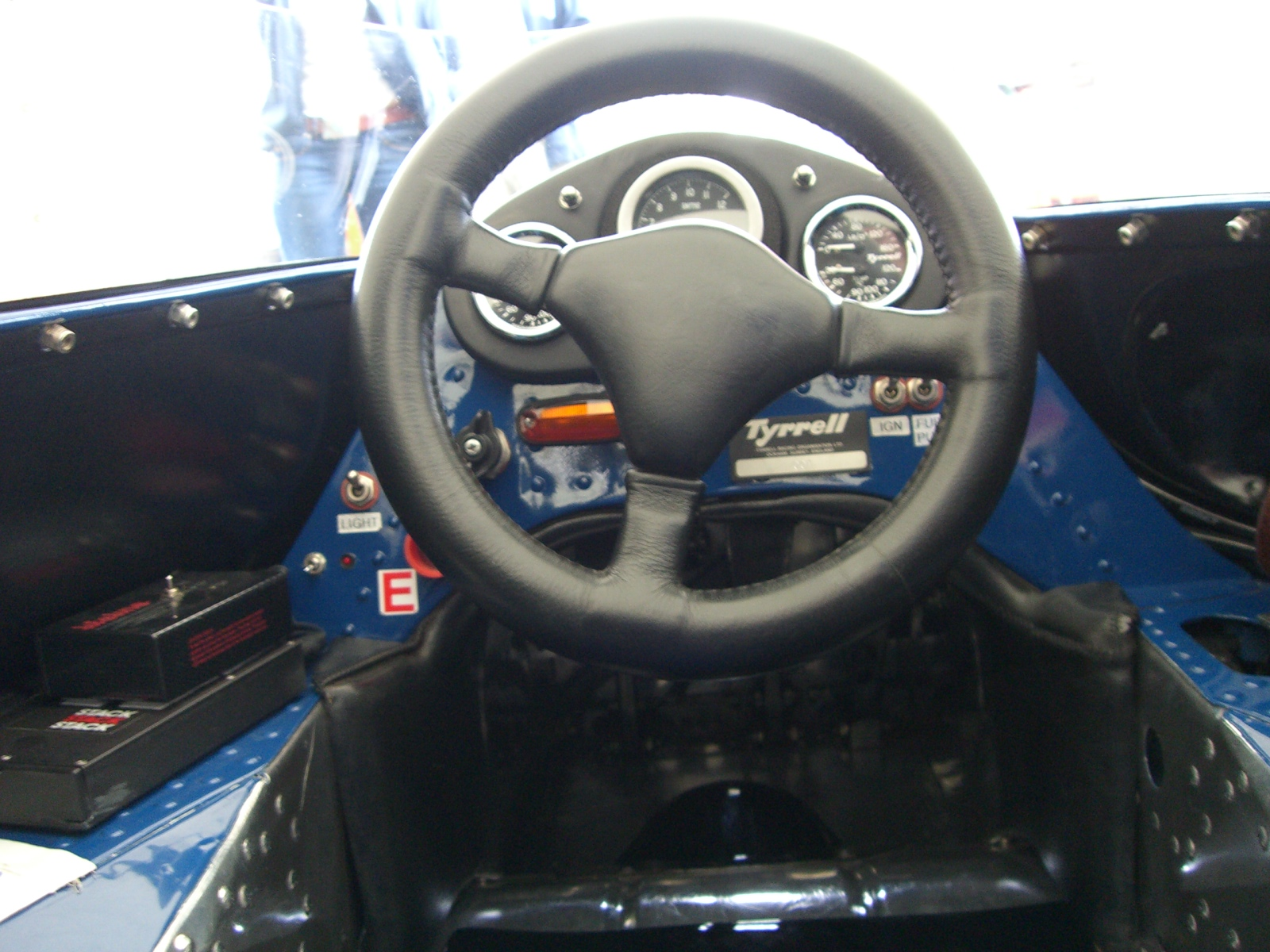
The cockpit of the Tyrrell 001

== Complete Formula One World Championship results ==
(key)(results in bold indicate pole position

Year	Entrant	Tyres	Driver	Grands Prix													Points	WCC
Year	Entrant	Tyres	Driver	RSA	ESP	MON	BEL	NED	FRA	GBR	GER	AUT	ITA	CAN	USA	MEX	Points	WCC
1970	Elf Team Tyrrell	**D**	(United Kingdom) Jackie Stewart										PO	**Ret**	Ret	Ret	0	-
1971	Elf Team Tyrrell	**G**		RSA	ESP	MON	NED	FRA	GBR	GER	AUT	ITA	CAN	USA			**73**^{†}	**1st**
1971	Elf Team Tyrrell	**G**	(United Kingdom) Jackie Stewart	**2**													**73**^{†}	**1st**
1971	Elf Team Tyrrell	**G**	(United States) Peter Revson											Ret			**73**^{†}	**1st**

^{†} 6 points were scored using the Tyrrell 001; the other 67 points were scored using the Tyrrell 002 and Tyrrell 003
