= Derek Gardner (designer) =

British engineer and car designer (1931–2011)

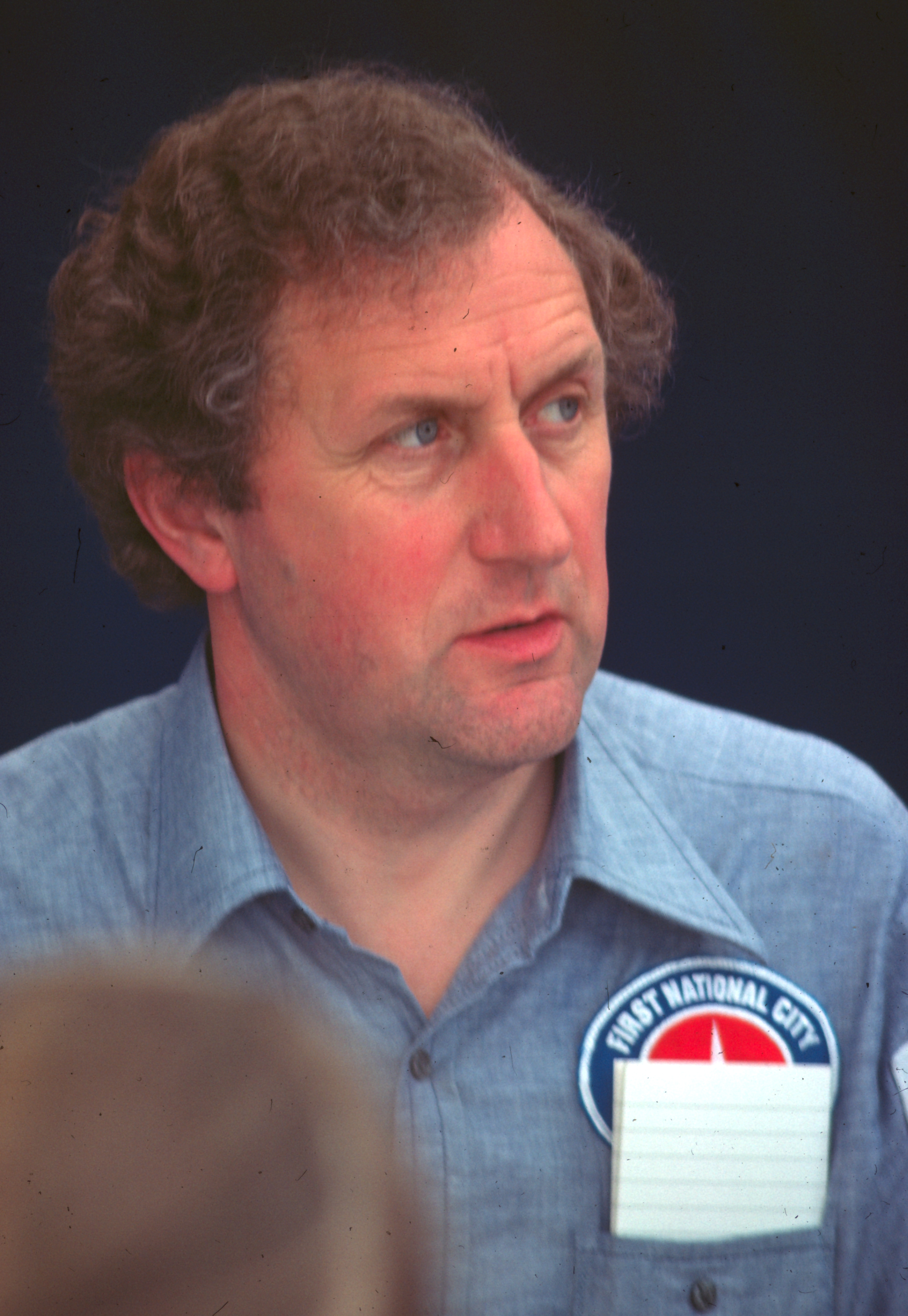
- Gardner in 1977
- Born: 19 September 1931; Leamington Spa, UK
- Died: 7 January 2011 (aged 79); Lutterworth, UK
- Occupation: Designer
- Years active: 1969–1976
- Known for: Formula One, (Matra, Tyrrell)
- Notable work: Tyrrell 001, 002 and 003; Tyrrell P34

Derek Gardner (19 September 1931 – 7 January 2011) was a car designer known for designing advanced transmission systems. He was born in Warwick, and joined Formula One while employed by Harry Ferguson Research, developing four-wheel drive systems for Matra in 1969. He met Ken Tyrrell in 1970 and Tyrrell chose Gardner to design his chassis. The first chassis, the Tyrrell 001, was built in his garage at home and was raced in the 1970 Canadian Grand Prix.

Jackie Stewart qualified the car on pole on its debut and led until an axle failed on lap 34. The car was further developed into the Tyrrell 002 and 003 and drivers Jackie Stewart and François Cevert achieved seven wins between them in 1971. Stewart won the Drivers' World Championship and Tyrrell took the Constructors' title.

Gardner's most iconic car was the Tyrrell P34, commonly known as the "six-wheeler". The car used four specially manufactured 10-inch-diameter (254 mm) wheels and tyres at the front, with two ordinary-sized wheels at the back. Along with the Brabham BT46B "fancar" developed in 1978, the six-wheeled Tyrrell was one of the most radical entries ever to succeed in F1 competition, and has been called the most recognizable design in the history of world motorsports.

Gardner also designed boats, electric bikes and microlites during his long career as a designer. He died in Lutterworth, aged 79.
