= François Cevert =

French racing driver (1944–1973)

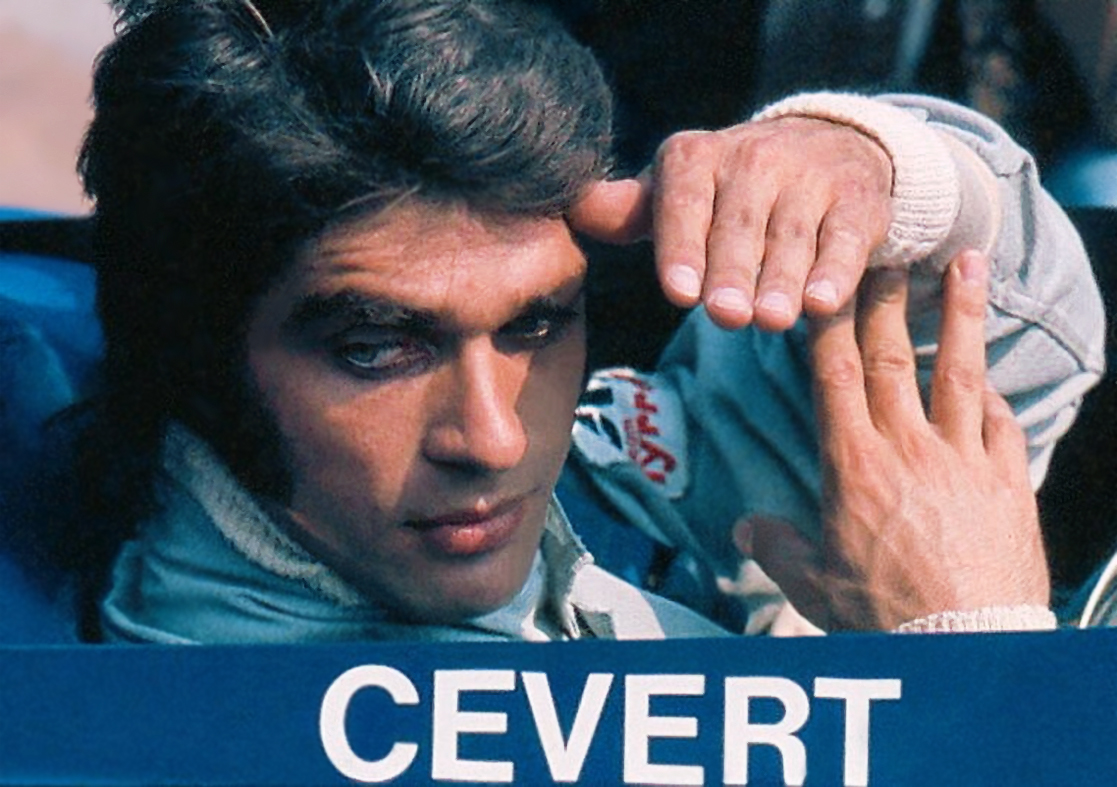
- Cevert at the 1973 German Grand Prix
- Born: Albert François Cevert; 25 February 1944; Paris, Nazi-occupied France
- Died: 6 October 1973 (aged 29); Watkins Glen, New York, U.S.
- Cause of death: Injuries sustained at the 1973 United States Grand Prix
- Relatives: Jean-Pierre Beltoise (brother-in-law)

Formula One World Championship career
- Nationality: (France) French
- Active years: 1969–1973
- Team(s): Tecno, Tyrrell
- Entries: 48 (47 starts)
- Championships: 0
- Wins: 1
- Podiums: 13
- Career points: 89
- Pole positions: 0
- Fastest laps: 2
- First entry: 1969 German Grand Prix
- First win: 1971 United States Grand Prix
- Last entry: 1973 United States Grand Prix

24 Hours of Le Mans career
- Years: 1970, 1972–1973
- Teams: Matra
- Best finish: 2nd (1972)
- Class wins: 0

Albert François Cevert (French pronunciation: [fʁɑ̃swa səvɛʁ]; 25 February 1944 – 6 October 1973) was a French racing driver, who competed in Formula One from 1969 to 1973. Cevert won the 1971 United States Grand Prix with Tyrrell.

Cevert competed in Formula One for Tecno and Tyrrell, finishing third in the World Drivers' Championship in 1971.

During qualifying for the 1973 United States Grand Prix, Cevert was killed when he crashed his Tyrrell 006 in an attempt at his maiden pole position.

== Family background ==
Cevert was the son of Charles Goldenberg (1901–1985), a Parisian jeweller, and Huguette Cevert. Charles was a Russian-Jewish émigré brought to France as a young boy by his parents, to escape the persecution of the Jews under the Tsarist autocracy. During World War II, under the Nazi occupation of France, Goldenberg joined the French Resistance to avoid forced deportation to General Government, as he was a registered Jew. In order not to draw further attention, Charles and Huguette's four children were all registered with her surname (Cevert) rather than his. Some years after the liberation of France, Cevert's father wanted to rename his children back to Goldenberg, but they decided not to as by now they had become used to being known as Cevert.

Cevert's sister would marry fellow Grand Prix driver Jean-Pierre Beltoise.

== Career ==
=== Early career ===
When he was 16, Cevert began his motorsport career on two wheels, rather than four, initially racing his mother's Vespa scooter against friends, before graduating to his own Norton at the age of 19. After completing his National Service, Cevert switched his attention to cars. In 1966, he completed a training course at the Le Mans school, before enrolling Winfield Racing School at the Magny-Cours racing school. At Winfield, he won the Volant Shell scholarship as the top finisher among the students. The prize was an Alpine Formula Three.

Cevert's first season in F3, at the wheel of his prize Alpine, did not go well. He lacked the funds and experience to properly set up and maintain his car. After finding sponsorship for the 1968 season, Cevert traded in his Alpine for a more competitive Tecno car. With his new mount Cevert finally started to win races, and by the end of the season he was French Formula 3 Champion, just ahead of Jean-Pierre Jabouille.

After winning the French Formula 3 Championship, Cevert joined the works Tecno Formula Two team in 1969, and finished third overall, as well as driving in the F2 class of the 1969 German Grand Prix. At the time, Formula Two was an ideal training ground for ambitious drivers, as many top Grand Prix drivers also competed in the F2 class, when their Formula One schedules permitted. When Jackie Stewart had a hard time getting around Cevert in an F2 race at Crystal Palace the same year, Stewart told his team manager Ken Tyrrell to keep an eye on the young Frenchman. This personal recommendation was to pay off in 1970, as when Tyrrell needed a new driver at short notice Stewart's recommendation was still in his mind. Tyrrell later commented on the reason for Cevert's appointment to the Formula One team that "everybody said it was (French oil company and Tyrrell sponsor) Elf, but it was really what Jackie said about him."

=== Formula One ===
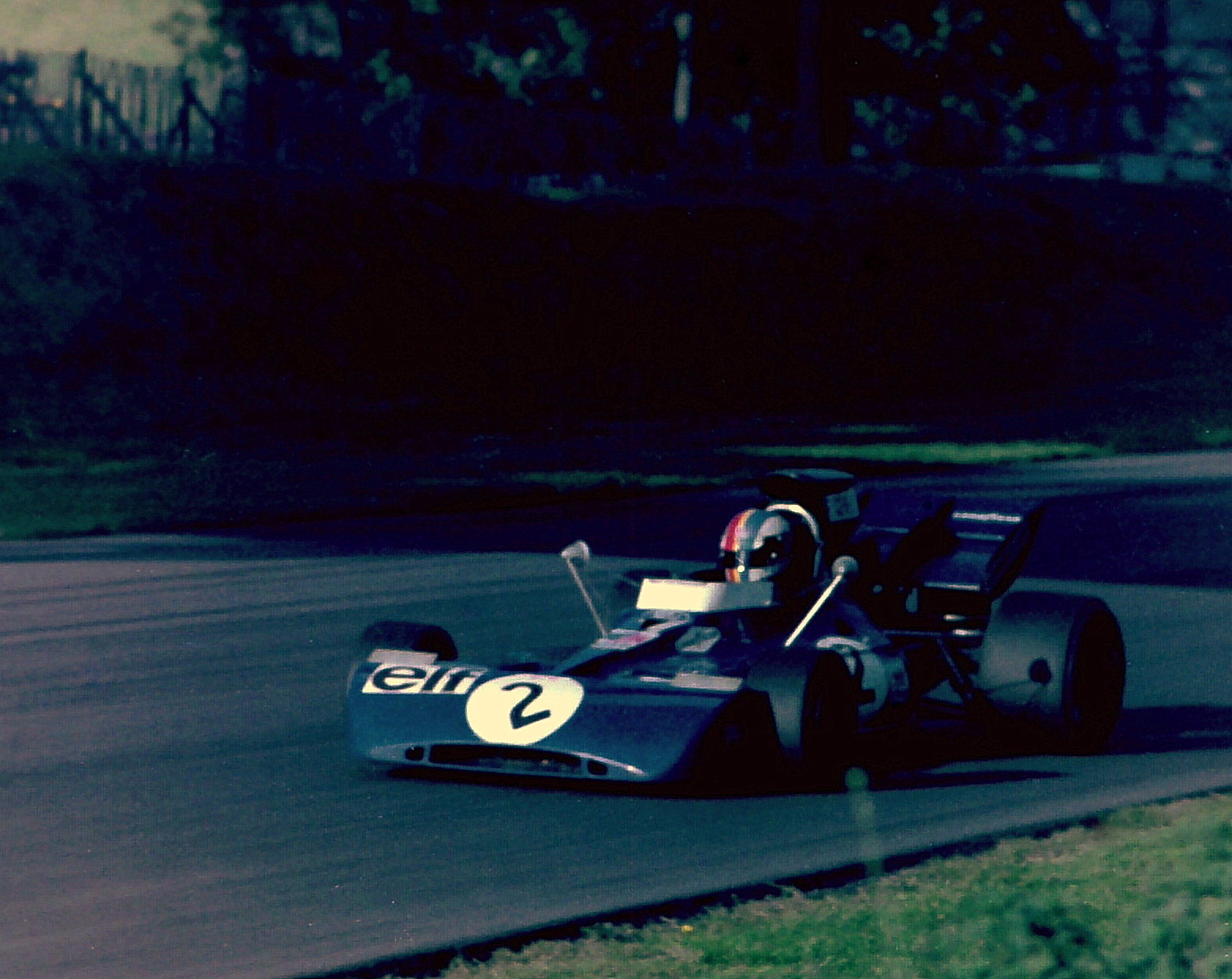
Cevert at the 1971 Rothmans World Championship Victory Race

When Johnny Servoz-Gavin suddenly retired from the Tyrrell Formula One team three races into the 1970 season, Tyrrell called upon Cevert to be his number two driver, alongside defending World Champion Stewart. Over the next four seasons, Cevert became the veteran Stewart's devoted protégé. After making his debut at the Dutch Grand Prix at Zandvoort in Tyrrell's second customer March-Ford, he increased his pace and closed the gap to Stewart with virtually every race. He earned his first World Championship point by finishing sixth in the Italian Grand Prix at Monza.

In 1971, with the Tyrrell team now building their own cars, Cevert finished second in France and Germany, both times behind team leader Stewart. Then, in the season-ending United States Grand Prix at the newly extended Watkins Glen race course, the Frenchman earned his first and only Grand Prix win.

"Having started from fifth spot, Cevert took the lead from Stewart on lap 14 as the Scot's tires began to go off in the 100° heat. At about half-distance, Cevert finally began to struggle with the same understeer that had plagued Stewart much earlier. Jacky Ickx was closing, and his Firestones were getting better as the race went on. On lap 43, Ickx set the fastest lap of the race, and the gap was down to 2.2 seconds. Then, on lap 49, the alternator on Ickx's Ferrari fell off, punching a hole in the gearbox and spilling oil all over the track! Denny Hulme's McLaren hit the oil and spun into the barrier, bending his front suspension. Hulme was standing beside the track when Cevert came by and also slid off and hit the barrier, but he kept going, now 29 seconds in the lead! Cevert coasted home, taking both hands off the wheel to wave as he crossed the line."

Cevert became only the second Frenchman to win a Formula One World Championship Grand Prix (Maurice Trintignant won at Monaco in 1955 and 1958), and received 50,000 U.S. dollars as award. It was the high point of his career, helping him take third place in the 1971 Drivers' Championship behind Stewart and Ronnie Peterson.

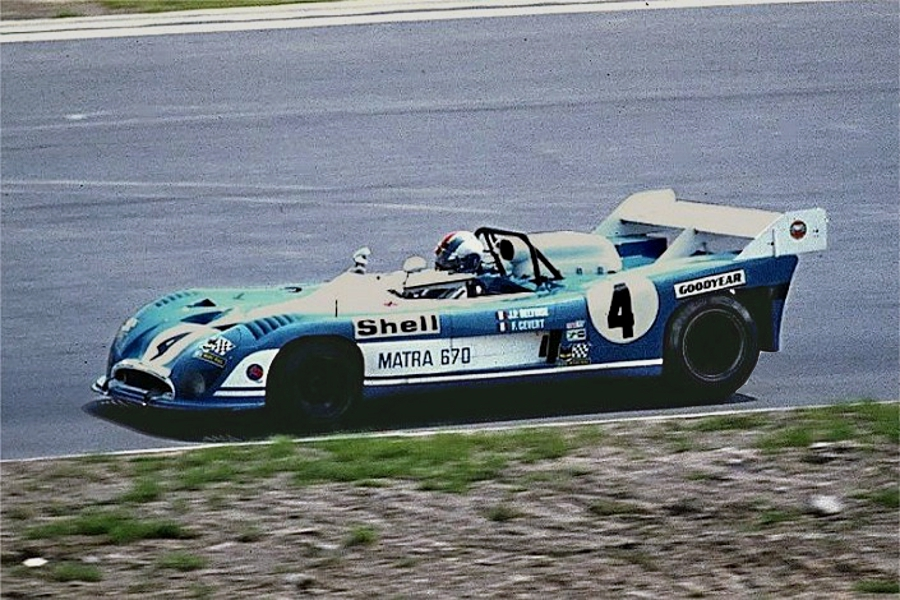
François Cevert driving the Matra 670 at the 1973 Nürburgring 1000 km race

Great expectations for Cevert, Stewart and Tyrrell were not fulfilled in 1972, Cevert finished in the points only three times, with second places in Belgium and in the United States, and a fourth at his home race in France at the Clermont-Ferrand circuit. One bright spot in a disappointing year for Cevert was his second-place finish at the 24 hours of Le Mans, driving a Matra-Simca 670 with New Zealand's Howden Ganley.

== Death ==
In 1973, the Tyrrell team was back on top in Formula One and Cevert showed he was capable of running with Stewart at almost every race. He finished second six times, three times behind Stewart, who acknowledged that at times the Frenchman had been a very "obedient" teammate. As Cevert began to draw even with Stewart's driving abilities, the Scot was secretly planning to retire after the last race of the season in the United States. For the 1974 season, Cevert would be Tyrrell's team leader.

At Watkins Glen, with Stewart having already clinched his third World Championship, Cevert was killed during Saturday morning qualifying, while battling for pole position with Ronnie Peterson. In the fast right-left uphill combination called "The Esses", Cevert's car was a little too far over towards the left side of the track, getting a bump from the kerbs. This made it swerve towards the right-hand side of the track, where it touched the track's signature powder blue safety barriers causing it to spin and crash into the barriers on the other side of the track at a near 90° angle, uprooting and lifting the barrier. Cevert died instantly of massive injuries inflicted by the barrier and seatbelt, which cut his body in half between his neck and his hip.

Stewart said that "Cevert had crashed violently in the uphill Esses heading onto the back of the circuit. Fighting the car as he went up the hill, he brushed the curb on the left, whipped across the track and hit the guardrail on the right. The car began to spin, and he swerved back across the track at 150 mph and hit the outside guardrail almost head-on." Stewart was one of the last on the scene of Cevert's accident and later said: "They [the marshals] had left him [in the car], because he was so clearly dead." Stewart immediately left the scene of the accident and returned to the pits.

Word of the severity of the crash gradually reached the pit area. Footage shows track personnel and members of other teams, including Lotus owner Colin Chapman heading for the Tyrrell pit where Stewart parked his car. Chapman was told by Lotus team manager Peter Warr that Cevert was the driver involved and that it was "very bad". When Stewart exited his car, Chapman apparently deduced simply from his expression that it was a fatal accident. The Lotus team boss shook his head and stated mournfully, "Cevert... bloody hell." He then sighed and started walking slowly back to the Lotus pits.

Peterson returned to the pits and Team Lotus boss Peter Warr asked him about Cevert's crash. Peterson's response was "I have never seen anything like it". He was later interviewed about the crash in 1975 in SVT, the Swedish television broadcaster in a documentary about Ronnie. He explained about the terrible sight of Cevert's body when he found him lying scattered in pieces of the wreckage. Peterson was still visibly shaken when talking about the accident and he also said that Cevert was his closest friend in F1.

Wilson Fittipaldi Júnior said he talked to Cevert earlier, wishing him good luck. After Cevert crashed, Wilson was still oblivious as to why all cars were returning to the pits, and why the crowd was silent. He then noticed that only Jackie Stewart's Tyrrell returned and not Cevert's. He talked with his race engineer, asking what happened. After the engineer confirmed Cevert's death, and being told the qualifying session would restart, Wilson got out of his car and furiously called the decision "bullshit", as he sat on top of the pit wall and refused to go back. Emerson Fittipaldi claims he parked his car shortly thereafter and immediately got out without speaking. He later called Cevert's death "[o]ne of the saddest [days] of my career. I asked [myself] 'is this what I really want?' as I was in the paddock". After the qualifying session resumed, he returned to his car, however. Because of Cevert's death, Tyrrell withdrew its entry for this GP, and Stewart did not run what had been planned to be his final, and 100th, race. Cevert was 29 years and 224 days old. He is buried in the Cimetière de Vaudelnay in the village of Vaudelnay, Maine-et-Loire.

=== Cause of the accident analysed by Stewart ===
When practice resumed, Stewart went out on the track in his car on a personal fact-finding mission. His conclusion was that his own preference was to take The Esses complex in fifth gear in the Tyrrell, hence he would be at the low end of the engine's rev range, making the car more tractable and less nervous (in exchange for a bit less throttle response). Cevert, however, preferred to use fourth gear and be at the top end of his engine's power range: it was always something of a compromise because of the need to accelerate through the combination of corners. Stewart noted that the Tyrrell always felt jumpy through this section of the Watkins Glen track owing to its short wheelbase; he felt that this was somewhat counteracted by driving in the higher gear even though this meant a time penalty if he got his line wrong through the corner.

A film documentary of the time, shot minutes before the start of the fatal practice session, captures Stewart and Cevert in a spirited debate on exactly this point. Another accident occurred at the same circuit a year later in the 1974 United States Grand Prix when another young Formula One driver, Helmut Koinigg, died when his car went straight into the barrier at turn 7, decapitating him. As a response to Cevert's and Koinigg's accidents, a chicane was added in 1975 in order to slow the cars through turns 2 to 4. That chicane was removed in 1985 after the track lost its Formula One race in 1981. It is not to be confused with the current chicane built in 1992 before the entrance to turn 5, which was installed after another two accidents during the 1991 racing season that resulted in severe injuries to Tommy Kendall and the death of J. D. McDuffie in separate racing incidents.

== Films ==
Cevert was extensively profiled and interviewed in the 1975 Formula One documentary The Quick and the Dead. The 2013 film Rush portrays a composite of Cevert's qualifying fatal accident, combining what appears to be the remains of a blue liveried 1973 Tyrrell 006 with the configuration of Helmut Koinigg's accident while driving the Surtees TS16 in the 1974 race. Also in 2013, 1: Life on the Limit documents Cevert's fatal accident in 1973.

== Racing record ==
=== Career summary ===
Season	Series	Team	Races	Wins	Poles	F/Laps	Podiums	Points	Position
1968	French Formula Three		?	?	?	?	?	?	**1st**
1969	European Formula Two	Tecno Racing Team	6	0	0	0	1	21	**3rd**
1969	Formula One	Tecno Racing Team	1	0	0	0	0	0	NC^{‡}
1970	Formula One	Tyrrell Racing Organisation	9	0	0	0	0	1	22nd
1970	European Formula Two	Tecno Racing Team	7	0	0	0	1	9	6th
1970	World Sportscar Championship	Equipe Matra Elf	1	0	0	0	0	0	NC
1971	Formula One	Elf Team Tyrrell	11	1	0	1	4	26	**3rd**
1971	European Formula Two	Équipe Tecno	9	2	1	1	2	22	5th
1972	Formula One	Elf Team Tyrrell	12	0	0	0	2	15	6th
1972	Can-Am	Young American Racing	8	1	0	0	4	59	5th
1972	European Formula Two	Elf John Coombs	4	0	1	1	1	0	NC
1972	British Formula Two	Elf John Coombs	2	0	0	1	1	8	6th
1972	World Sportscar Championship	Equipe Matra-Simca Shell	1	0	1	0	1	15	NC
1973	Formula One	Elf Team Tyrrell	14	0	0	1	7	47	4th
1973	World Sportscar Championship	Equipe Matra-Simca	6	0	5	6	2	47	NC
1973	World Sportscar Championship	Equipe Matra-Simca Shell	2	1	1	0	1	47	NC
1973	European Formula Two	Elf John Coombs	1	1	0	0	1	0	NC

^{‡} Ineligible for Formula One points, because Cevert drove with a Formula Two car.

=== Complete European Formula Two Championship results ===
(key) (Races in bold indicate pole position; races in italics indicate fastest lap)

Year	Entrant	Chassis	Engine	1	2	3	4	5	6	7	8	9	10	11	12	13	14	15	16	17	Pos.	Points
1969	Tecno Racing Team	Tecno TF68	Ford Cosworth FVA 1.6 L4	THR; 8	HOC; 9	NÜR; 7	JAR; 12	TUL; 5	PER; 3	VAL											3rd	21
1970	Tecno Racing Team	Tecno TF70	Ford Cosworth FVA 1.6 L4	THR	HOC; 11	BAR; Ret	ROU; Ret	PER; Ret	TUL; 3	IMO; Ret	HOC; Ret										6th	9
1971	Équipe Tecno Elf	Tecno TF71	Ford Cosworth BDA 1.6 L4	HOC; 1	THR; 4	NÜR; 1	JAR; Ret	PAL; DNQ	ROU; Ret	MAN; Ret	TUL; 11	ALB; Ret	VAL; Ret	VAL							5th	22
1972	Elf John Coombs	March 722	Ford Cosworth BDA 1.6 L4	MAL	THR; 2	HOC; Ret	PAU; DNQ	PAL; 5	HOC	ROU; 6	ÖST	IMO	MAN	PER	SAL	ALB	HOC				NC†	0†
1973	Elf John Coombs	Alpine A367	Ford Cosworth BDA 1.6 L4	MAL	HOC	THR	NÜR	PAU; 1	KIN	NIV	HOC	ROU	MNZ	MAN	KAR	PER	SAL	NOR	ALB	VLL	NC†	0†

^{†} As Cevert was a graded driver, he was ineligible for points.

=== Complete Formula One World Championship results ===
(key) (Races in italics indicate fastest lap)

Year	Entrant	Chassis	Engine	1	2	3	4	5	6	7	8	9	10	11	12	13	14	15	WDC	Pts.
1969	Tecno Racing Team	Tecno TF69	Ford L4	RSA	ESP	MON	NED	FRA	GBR	GER; Ret	ITA	CAN	USA	MEX					NC^{‡}	0^{‡}
1970	Tyrrell Racing Organisation	March 701	Ford V8	RSA	ESP	MON	BEL	NED; Ret	FRA; 11	GBR; 7	GER; 7	AUT; Ret	ITA; 6	CAN; 9	USA; Ret	MEX; Ret			22nd	1
1971	Elf Team Tyrrell	Tyrrell 002	Ford V8	RSA; Ret	ESP; 7	MON; Ret	NED; Ret	FRA; 2	GBR; 10	GER; 2	AUT; Ret	ITA; 3	CAN; 6	USA; 1					**3rd**	**26**
1972	Elf Team Tyrrell	Tyrrell 002	Ford V8	ARG; Ret	RSA; 9	ESP; Ret	MON; NC	BEL; 2	FRA; 4	GBR; Ret	GER; 10	AUT; 9	ITA; Ret						6th	15
1972	Elf Team Tyrrell	Tyrrell 006	Ford V8											CAN; Ret	USA; 2				6th	15
1973	Elf Team Tyrrell	Tyrrell 006	Ford V8	ARG; 2	BRA; 10		ESP; 2	BEL; 2	MON; 4	SWE; 3	FRA; 2	GBR; 5	NED; 2	GER; 2	AUT; Ret	ITA; 5	CAN; Ret	USA; DNS	4th	47
1973	Elf Team Tyrrell	Tyrrell 005	Ford V8			RSA; NC													4th	47

^{‡} Ineligible for Formula One points, because Cevert drove with a Formula Two car.

=== Non-Championship results ===
(key) (Races in bold indicate pole position) (Races in italics indicate fastest lap)

Year	Entrant	Chassis	Engine	1	2	3	4	5	6	7	8
1971	Elf Team Tyrrell	Tyrrell 002	Ford V8	ARG	ROC	QUE	SPR	INT	RIN	OUL	VIC; 7

=== 24 Hours of Le Mans results ===
Year	Team	Co-drivers	Car	Class	Laps	Pos.	Class pos.
1970	(France) Equipe Matra Elf	(Australia) Jack Brabham	Matra-Simca MS650	P 3.0	76	DNF	DNF
1972	(France) Equipe Matra-Simca Shell	(New Zealand) Howden Ganley	Matra-Simca MS670	S 3.0	333	**2nd**	**2nd**
1973	(France) Equipe Matra-Simca Shell	(France) Jean-Pierre Beltoise	Matra-Simca MS670B	S 3.0	157	DNF	DNF

=== Achievements ===
- 1966 Volant Shell Winner
- French Formula 3 Champion 1968
- Third in the Formula 2 European Championship 1969
- Third in the Formula 1 Drivers' World Championship 1971
- Second in the 24 hours of Le Mans 1972
- Winner in Donnybrook, Can-Am 1972
- Winner of 1000 km of Paris 1970

== See also ==
- List of select Jewish racing drivers

Sporting positions
Preceded by Henri Pescarolo	French Formula Three; Champion; 1968	Succeeded by François Mazet
Preceded by Roger Williamson	Formula One fatal accidents 6 October 1973	Succeeded by Peter Revson
