= 1973 Canadian Grand Prix =

Race details
- Date: 23 September 1973
- Official name: XIII Labatt's Grand Prix of Canada
- Location: Mosport Park, Bowmanville, Ontario, Canada
- Course: Permanent racing facility
- Course length: 3.957 km (2.459 miles)
- Distance: 80 laps, 316.56 km (196.72 miles)
- Weather: Mild with temperatures approaching 22.2 °C (72.0 °F); wind speeds up to 11.8 kilometres per hour (7.3 mph)

Pole position
Driver	(Sweden) Ronnie Peterson	Lotus-Ford
- Time: 1:13.697

Fastest lap
Driver	(Brazil) Emerson Fittipaldi	Lotus-Ford
- Time: 1:15.496

Podium
First	(United States) Peter Revson	McLaren-Ford
Second	(Brazil) Emerson Fittipaldi	Lotus-Ford
Third	(United Kingdom) Jackie Oliver	Shadow-Ford

The 1973 Canadian Grand Prix was a Formula One motor race held at Mosport Park on 23 September 1973. It was race 14 of 15 in both the 1973 World Championship of Drivers and the 1973 International Cup for Formula One Manufacturers.

The 80-lap race was won by Peter Revson, driving a McLaren M23, after starting from second on the grid. This turned out to be Revson's last victory and podium finish in Formula One. As of the conclusion of the 2025 Formula One World Championship, this is the last Grand Prix to be won by a driver born in the USA. Emerson Fittipaldi took second position for Team Lotus, while Jackie Oliver took third in a Shadow, his first podium in five years and his last of all.

This was also the 99th and last race start of triple world champion Jackie Stewart.

== Qualifying classification ==
Pos	No	Driver	Constructor	Time/Gap
1	2	(Sweden) Ronnie Peterson	Lotus–Ford	1:13.697
2	8	(United States) Peter Revson	McLaren–Ford	+1.040
3	0	(South Africa) Jody Scheckter	McLaren–Ford	+1.061
4	10	(Argentina) Carlos Reutemann	Brabham–Ford	+1.116
5	1	(Brazil) Emerson Fittipaldi	Lotus–Ford	+1.338
6	6	(France) François Cevert	Tyrrell–Ford	+1.421
7	7	(New Zealand) Denny Hulme	McLaren–Ford	+1.622
8	21	(Austria) Niki Lauda	BRM	+1.703
9	5	(United Kingdom) Jackie Stewart	Tyrrell–Ford	+1.944
10	11	(Brazil) Wilson Fittipaldi	Brabham–Ford	+2.415
11	29	(New Zealand) Chris Amon	Tyrrell–Ford	+2.531
12	23	(United Kingdom) Mike Hailwood	Surtees–Ford	+2.593
13	16	(United States) George Follmer	Shadow–Ford	+2.661
14	17	(United Kingdom) Jackie Oliver	Shadow–Ford	+2.739
15	27	(United Kingdom) James Hunt	March–Ford	+2.807
16	20	(France) Jean-Pierre Beltoise	BRM	+2.926
17	12	(United Kingdom) Graham Hill	Shadow–Ford	+3.043
18	9	(West Germany) Rolf Stommelen	Brabham–Ford	+3.149
19	24	(Brazil) Carlos Pace	Surtees–Ford	+3.331
20	4	(Italy) Arturo Merzario	Ferrari	+3.653
21	15	(United Kingdom) Mike Beuttler	March–Ford	+3.686
22	25	(New Zealand) Howden Ganley	Williams–Ford	+3.882
23	18	(France) Jean-Pierre Jarier	March–Ford	+4.024
24	26	(Australia) Tim Schenken	Williams–Ford	+4.705
25	19	(United Kingdom) Peter Gethin	BRM	+4.801
26	28	(Liechtenstein) Rikky von Opel	Ensign–Ford	+4.985

== Race report ==
This was the first Grand Prix to feature a car with the number 0, the car in question being the McLaren of Jody Scheckter.

The race start was delayed from 2:30pm to 3:00pm and began in very wet conditions, which caused a number of incidents later in the race. François Cevert and Scheckter collided on the 32nd lap, resulting in the deployment of a safety car for the first time in Formula One history (although it would not be until twenty years later, in 1993, when these cars were given an official role). The car in question was a yellow Porsche 914 driven by former F1 privateer Eppie Wietzes. Wietzes stayed in front of Howden Ganley's Iso-Marlboro because of race control's mistake, which allowed several drivers, including eventual winner Peter Revson, to gain a lap on the field.

Pit stops at the time were unusual. Formula One had only recently switched to slick tyres but the drying conditions necessitated stops mid-race. The small pit lane at Mosport became busy, with a number of drivers heading into the pit lane only to have to drive through as there was no room for them to be serviced. Ganley realised the problem and waited until team-mate Tim Schenken had made his stop, making him one of the last to stop. The pit stops caused significant confusion, with some believing the leader to be Ganley and others, including Team Lotus manager Colin Chapman, believing it to be Emerson Fittipaldi. Chapman even went as far as to perform his traditional victory celebration of tossing his cap in the air at the end of what he believed to be the 80th lap, even though Fittipaldi was not shown the checkered flag. After a long pause, the starter waved the flag over a group of cars consisting of Ganley, Mike Hailwood, Peter Revson and James Hunt. Despite seeing the flag first, Ganley did not believe he had won the race, despite lap charts kept by the team showing him leading. The officials then announced Revson as the winner after a long confusion which included protests from Ganley's then girlfriend (later wife) who had been keeping the team's lap chart. Ganley maintains he feels he either won the race or finished third, citing the fact official lap charts have him pitting when he did not.

== Race classification ==
Pos	No	Driver	Constructor	Laps	Time/Retired	Grid	Points
1	8	(United States) Peter Revson	McLaren-Ford	80	1:59:04.083	2	9
2	1	(Brazil) Emerson Fittipaldi	Lotus-Ford	80	+32.734	5	6
3	17	(United Kingdom) Jackie Oliver	Shadow-Ford	80	+34.505	14	4
4	20	(France) Jean-Pierre Beltoise	BRM	80	+36.514	16	3
5	5	(United Kingdom) Jackie Stewart	Tyrrell-Ford	79	+1 lap	9	2
6	25	(New Zealand) Howden Ganley	Iso-Marlboro-Ford	79	+1 lap	22	1
7	27	(United Kingdom) James Hunt	March-Ford	78	+2 laps	15	
8	10	(Argentina) Carlos Reutemann	Brabham-Ford	78	+2 laps	4	
9	23	(United Kingdom) Mike Hailwood	Surtees-Ford	78	+2 laps	12	
10	29	(New Zealand) Chris Amon	Tyrrell-Ford	77	+3 laps	11	
11	11	(Brazil) Wilson Fittipaldi	Brabham-Ford	77	+3 laps	10	
12	9	(Germany) Rolf Stommelen	Brabham-Ford	76	+4 laps	18	
13	7	(New Zealand) Denny Hulme	McLaren-Ford	75	+5 laps	7	
14	26	(Australia) Tim Schenken	Iso-Marlboro-Ford	75	+5 laps	24	
15	4	(Italy) Arturo Merzario	Ferrari	75	+5 laps	20	
16	12	(United Kingdom) Graham Hill	Shadow-Ford	73	+7 laps	17	
17	16	(United States) George Follmer	Shadow-Ford	73	+7 laps	13	
18	24	(Brazil) Carlos Pace	Surtees-Ford	72	+8 laps	19	
NC	18	(France) Jean-Pierre Jarier	March-Ford	71	+9 laps	23	
NC	28	(Liechtenstein) Rikky von Opel	Ensign-Ford	68	+12 laps	26	
Ret	21	(Austria) Niki Lauda	BRM	62	Transmission	8	
Ret	0	(South Africa) Jody Scheckter	McLaren-Ford	32	Collision	3	
Ret	6	(France) François Cevert	Tyrrell-Ford	32	Collision	6	
Ret	15	(United Kingdom) Mike Beuttler	March-Ford	20	Engine	21	
Ret	2	(Sweden) Ronnie Peterson	Lotus-Ford	16	Suspension	1	
Ret	19	(United Kingdom) Peter Gethin	BRM	5	Oil pump	25	

== Notes ==
- This was the 50th Grand Prix start for British constructor March.

== Championship standings after the race ==
Drivers' Championship standings
Pos	Driver	Points
1	(United Kingdom) **Jackie Stewart**	71
2	(Brazil) Emerson Fittipaldi	54
3	(France) François Cevert	47
4	(Sweden) Ronnie Peterson	43
5	(United States) Peter Revson	36

Constructors' Championship standings
	Pos	Constructor	Points
1	1	(United Kingdom) **Lotus-Ford***	83 (87)
1	2	(United Kingdom) **Tyrrell-Ford***	82 (86)
	3	(United Kingdom) McLaren-Ford	55
	4	(United Kingdom) Brabham-Ford	18
	5	(Italy) Ferrari	12

- Note: Only the top five positions are included for both sets of standings. Only the best 7 results from the first 8 races and the best 6 results from the last 7 races counted towards the Championship. Numbers without parentheses are Championship points; numbers in parentheses are total points scored.
- **Bold text** indicates the 1973 World Drivers' Champion.
- Competitors in bold and marked with an asterisk still had a theoretical chance of becoming World Champion.

Previous race: 1973 Italian Grand Prix	FIA Formula One World Championship; 1973 season	Next race: 1973 United States Grand Prix
Previous race: 1972 Canadian Grand Prix	Canadian Grand Prix	Next race: 1974 Canadian Grand Prix
