= 1973 United States Grand Prix =

Race details
- Date: October 7, 1973
- Official name: XVI United States Grand Prix
- Location: Watkins Glen Grand Prix Race Course; Watkins Glen, New York
- Course: Permanent road course
- Course length: 5.435 km (3.377 miles)
- Distance: 59 laps, 320.67 km (199.24 miles)
- Weather: Cloudy with temperatures approaching 20 °C (68 °F); Wind speeds up to 14.82 km/h (9.21 mph)

Pole position
Driver	(Sweden) Ronnie Peterson	Lotus-Ford
- Time: 1:39.657

Fastest lap
Driver	(United Kingdom) James Hunt	March-Ford
- Time: 1:41.652 on lap 58

Podium
First	(Sweden) Ronnie Peterson	Lotus-Ford
Second	(United Kingdom) James Hunt	March-Ford
Third	(Argentina) Carlos Reutemann	Brabham-Ford

The 1973 United States Grand Prix was a Formula One motor race held on October 7, 1973 at the Watkins Glen Grand Prix Race Course in Watkins Glen, New York. It was race 15 of 15 in both the 1973 World Championship of Drivers and the 1973 International Cup for Formula One Manufacturers.

The 59-lap race was won from pole position by Ronnie Peterson, driving a Lotus-Ford. Peterson held off James Hunt in the Hesketh-entered March-Ford to take his fourth victory of the season, with Carlos Reutemann third in a Brabham-Ford.

The race was overshadowed by the death of François Cevert during qualifying, the day before, in what was to have been the 100th and final Grand Prix for Tyrrell team-mate and triple World Champion Jackie Stewart. The Tyrrell team withdrew from the event as a consequence, handing the Manufacturers' Cup to Lotus.

== Summary ==
Ronnie Peterson ended his first year with Lotus by taking his fourth win of the season, as a thrilling two-man battle ended with Peterson beating James Hunt to the flag by the smallest winning margin in USGP history at that time. The Englishman finished less than a second behind in his Hesketh Racing entered March, but the normal celebrations were tempered by the death of François Cevert during qualifying and the premature end of the career of three-time World Champion Jackie Stewart.

=== Death of François Cevert ===
Stewart had already clinched his third World Driver's Championship when the teams came to Watkins Glen, and he intended the final Grand Prix of 1973 to be his swan song. "I had decided in April that I would retire at the end of the season, win or lose," Stewart recalled. "Watkins Glen was going to be my last race in a Formula One car. François Cevert was going to be number one in the team for 1974, although he never knew it. Ken Tyrrell and I had kept it a secret that I was going to retire after that race. In fact, not even my wife, Helen, who was with me that weekend, knew."

With just a few minutes left in the Saturday morning qualifying session, however, the track suddenly fell quiet. Cevert had crashed violently in the uphill Esses heading onto the back of the circuit, between Turns Three and Four. Fighting the car as he went up the hill, Cevert ran too high on the kerbs and slid into the right-hand guardrail. The car then lashed sideways across the track and struck the Armco on the left side of the track at 150 mph at an almost 90-degree angle. The nose of the car submarined into the ground, causing the car to flip upwards on over the barrier, which ripped off the front of the car, which landed in the middle of the track while the rear of the car came to rest upside down on top of the Armco.

Jody Scheckter's McLaren was close behind, and he stopped and rushed over to help Cevert out of the car, but when the front of the car had been ripped off, Cevert had been exposed to making direct physical contact with the barrier and had died instantly. Ken Tyrrell had lost a great driver and Jackie Stewart an outstanding teammate at the circuit where Cevert had taken his only Grand Prix win. "It was a horrendous accident which took the life of a wonderfully charming, personable, handsome young man, who was a tremendous friend to both Helen and me," Stewart said.

When qualifying resumed, Peterson's time from the morning session stood up for his ninth pole of the year. The Tyrrells of Stewart and Chris Amon had earned the fifth and twelfth spots on the grid, but the team decided to withdraw in tribute to Cevert, and Stewart's driving career was over after 99 races and what was then a record 27 Grand Prix wins.

=== Race ===
On Sunday, a huge crowd turned out on a cool, overcast day for the race. On the grid, in seventh spot, home favorite Peter Revson felt his car creeping forward as the flag was raised. Rather than hold it with the brakes, he took it out of gear just as the flag dropped. He waved his arms in the air and waited for the field to roar past, then set off in last place.

The front runners got away well, and at the end of the first lap, Peterson led Carlos Reutemann, Hunt, Emerson Fittipaldi, Mike Hailwood and Scheckter. On lap 4, Hunt passed Reutemann for second, and began his chase of Peterson's Lotus. To the surprise of everyone as the race progressed, Hunt was able to stay around one second behind Peterson. Occasionally the gap would widen slightly, but again and again, the extreme straightline speed of the Hesketh March would close it again.

Reutemann kept pace as well, two to three seconds behind Hunt, until he lost nine seconds attempting to lap Graham Hill. From then on, he ran a lonely race to a third-place finish.

Revson, meanwhile, was rocketing through the field from his last place start, and at the midway point, he had gone from twenty-third to seventh. He took sixth from Emerson on lap 40 when the Brazilian pitted to replace his front tyres that were flat-spotted when he had to avoid a spinning Scheckter.

For the last 15 laps, Hunt continued to follow Peterson, between .7 and 1.4 seconds behind. He pulled alongside at one point, but could not finish the pass. "I looked over at Ronnie, and he looked fiercer than me," he explained after the race.

Hunt had decided to bide his time until the final 10 laps, then make a bid to pass Peterson, but his car developed oversteer with a lightening fuel load. This kept him from taking the final corner before the back straight flat out, and effectively took away his speed advantage. He maintained the challenge to the flag, however, setting the fastest lap of the race on the penultimate lap. Peterson's winning margin of 0.688 seconds was the smallest in United States Grand Prix history until 2002.

Reutemann had to weave to the line, virtually out of fuel, but held on to third; Denny Hulme ran a steady race to fourth; Revson made it up to fifth with his splendid drive from last place; and Emerson Fittipaldi took sixth after having to stop for tyres. Having already secured the Manufacturers' Cup following Tyrrell's withdrawal, Lotus finished ten points ahead, despite Stewart taking the Drivers' Championship for Tyrrell.

== Classification ==
=== Qualifying ===
Pos	No	Driver	Constructor	Time	Gap	Grid
1	2	(Sweden) Ronnie Peterson	Lotus-Ford	1:39.657	—	1
2	10	(Argentina) Carlos Reutemann	Brabham-Ford	1:40.013	+0.356	2
3	1	(Brazil) Emerson Fittipaldi	Lotus-Ford	1:40.393	+0.736	3
4	6	(France) François Cevert	Tyrrell-Ford	1:40.444	+0.787	DNS
5	27	(United Kingdom) James Hunt	March-Ford	1:40.520	+0.863	4
6	5	(United Kingdom) Jackie Stewart	Tyrrell-Ford	1:40.635	+0.978	5
7	23	(United Kingdom) Mike Hailwood	Surtees-Ford	1:40.844	+1.187	6
8	8	(United States) Peter Revson	McLaren-Ford	1:40.895	+1.238	7
9	7	(New Zealand) Denny Hulme	McLaren-Ford	1:40.907	+1.250	8
10	24	(Brazil) Carlos Pace	Surtees-Ford	1:41.125	+1.468	9
11	0	(South Africa) Jody Scheckter	McLaren-Ford	1:41.321	+1.664	10
12	4	(Italy) Arturo Merzario	Ferrari	1:41.455	+1.798	11
13	29	(New Zealand) Chris Amon	Tyrrell-Ford	1:41.679	+2.022	12
14	31	(United Kingdom) Brian Redman	Shadow-Ford	1:42.247	+2.590	13
15	20	(France) Jean-Pierre Beltoise	BRM	1:42.417	+2.760	14
16	19	(Switzerland) Clay Regazzoni	BRM	1:42.468	+2.811	15
17	30	(West Germany) Jochen Mass	Surtees-Ford	1:42.517	+2.860	16
18	18	(France) Jean-Pierre Jarier	March-Ford	1:42.752	+3.095	17
19	12	(United Kingdom) Graham Hill	Shadow-Ford	1:42.848	+3.191	18
20	25	(New Zealand) Howden Ganley	Iso-Marlboro-Ford	1:43.166	+3.509	19
21	16	(United States) George Follmer	Shadow-Ford	1:43.387	+3.730	20
22	21	(Austria) Niki Lauda	BRM	1:43.543	+3.886	21
23	17	(United Kingdom) Jackie Oliver	Shadow-Ford	1:43.650	+3.993	22
24	26	(Belgium) Jacky Ickx	Iso-Marlboro-Ford	1:43.885	+4.228	23
25	9	(United Kingdom) John Watson	Brabham-Ford	1:43.887	+4.230	24
26	11	(Brazil) Wilson Fittipaldi	Brabham-Ford	1:44.478	+4.821	25
27	15	(United Kingdom) Mike Beuttler	March-Ford	1:45.032	+5.375	26
28	28	(Liechtenstein) Rikky von Opel	Ensign-Ford	1:45.441	+5.784	27

=== Race ===
Pos	No	Driver	Constructor	Laps	Time/Retired	Grid	Points
1	2	(Sweden) Ronnie Peterson	Lotus-Ford	59	1:41:15.779	1	9
2	27	(United Kingdom) James Hunt	March-Ford	59	+ 0.668	4	6
3	10	(Argentina) Carlos Reutemann	Brabham-Ford	59	+ 22.930	2	4
4	7	(New Zealand) Denny Hulme	McLaren-Ford	59	+ 50.226	8	3
5	8	(United States) Peter Revson	McLaren-Ford	59	+ 1:20.367	7	2
6	1	(Brazil) Emerson Fittipaldi	Lotus-Ford	59	+ 1:47.945	3	1
7	26	(Belgium) Jacky Ickx	Iso-Marlboro-Ford	58	+ 1 Lap	23	
8	19	(Switzerland) Clay Regazzoni	BRM	58	+ 1 Lap	15	
9	20	(France) Jean-Pierre Beltoise	BRM	58	+ 1 Lap	14	
10	15	(United Kingdom) Mike Beuttler	March-Ford	58	+ 1 Lap	26	
11	18	(France) Jean-Pierre Jarier	March-Ford	57	Accident	17	
12	25	(New Zealand) Howden Ganley	Iso-Marlboro-Ford	57	+ 2 Laps	19	
13	12	(United Kingdom) Graham Hill	Shadow-Ford	57	+ 2 Laps	18	
14	16	(United States) George Follmer	Shadow-Ford	57	+ 2 Laps	20	
15	17	(United Kingdom) Jackie Oliver	Shadow-Ford	55	+ 4 Laps	22	
16	4	(Italy) Arturo Merzario	Ferrari	55	+ 4 Laps	11	
NC	11	(Brazil) Wilson Fittipaldi	Brabham-Ford	52	+ 7 Laps	25	
Ret	0	(South Africa) Jody Scheckter	McLaren-Ford	39	Suspension	10	
Ret	30	(West Germany) Jochen Mass	Surtees-Ford	35	Engine	16	
Ret	21	(Austria) Niki Lauda	BRM	35	Fuel Pump	21	
Ret	23	(United Kingdom) Mike Hailwood	Surtees-Ford	34	Suspension	6	
Ret	24	(Brazil) Carlos Pace	Surtees-Ford	32	Suspension	9	
Ret	9	(United Kingdom) John Watson	Brabham-Ford	7	Engine	24	
DSQ	31	(United Kingdom) Brian Redman	Shadow-Ford	5	Received Outside Assistance	13	
Ret	28	(Liechtenstein) Rikky von Opel	Ensign-Ford	0	Throttle	27	
DNS	5	(United Kingdom) Jackie Stewart	Tyrrell-Ford	0	Withdrew (Fatal Accident in team)	5	
DNS	29	(New Zealand) Chris Amon	Tyrrell-Ford	0	Withdrew (Fatal Accident in team)	12	
DNS	6	(France) François Cevert	Tyrrell-Ford		Fatal Accident in Qualifying		

- François Cevert did not start to race due to a fatal accident in qualifying practice. His place on the grid was left vacant.
- Jackie Stewart and Chris Amon did not start to race due to withdrawal after Cevert's death. Their places on the grid were left vacant.

== Notes ==
- This was the 10th pole position and 5th Grand Prix win for a Swedish driver.
- This race marked the 58th fastest lap set by a Ford-powered car. This broke the record set by Ferrari at the 1972 Italian Grand Prix.

== Final Championship standings ==
Drivers' Championship standings

	Pos	Driver	Points
	1	(United Kingdom) **Jackie Stewart***	71
	2	(Brazil) Emerson Fittipaldi	55
1	3	(Sweden) Ronnie Peterson	52
1	4	(France) François Cevert	47
	5	(United States) Peter Revson	38

Constructors' Championship standings

	Pos	Constructor	Points
	1	(United Kingdom) **Lotus-Ford***	92 (96)
	2	(United Kingdom) Tyrrell-Ford	82 (86)
	3	(United Kingdom) McLaren-Ford	58
	4	(United Kingdom) Brabham-Ford	22
3	5	(United Kingdom) March-Ford	14

- Note: Only the top five positions are included for both sets of standings. Only the best 7 results from the first 8 races and the best 6 results from the last 7 races counted towards the Championship. Numbers without parentheses are Championship points; numbers in parentheses are total points scored.
- Competitors in bold and marked with an asterisk are the 1973 World Champions.

Previous race: 1973 Canadian Grand Prix	FIA Formula One World Championship; 1973 season	Next race: 1974 Argentine Grand Prix
Previous race: 1972 United States Grand Prix	United States Grand Prix	Next race: 1974 United States Grand Prix
