= 1972 Canadian Grand Prix =

Race details
- Date: September 24, 1972
- Official name: XII Labatt's Grand Prix of Canada
- Location: Mosport International Raceway, Ontario, Canada
- Course: Permanent racing facility
- Course length: 3.957 km (2.458 miles)
- Distance: 80 laps, 316.56 km (196.64 miles)
- Weather: Mild with temperatures approaching 22.8 °C (73.0 °F); wind speeds up to 12 kilometres per hour (7.5 mph)

Pole position
Driver	(United States) Peter Revson	McLaren-Ford
- Time: 1:13.6

Fastest lap
Driver	(United Kingdom) Jackie Stewart	Tyrrell-Ford
- Time: 1:15.7

Podium
First	(United Kingdom) Jackie Stewart	Tyrrell-Ford
Second	(United States) Peter Revson	McLaren-Ford
Third	(New Zealand) Denny Hulme	McLaren-Ford

The 1972 Canadian Grand Prix was a Formula One motor race held at Mosport Park on 24 September 1972. It was race 11 of 12 in both the 1972 World Championship of Drivers and the 1972 International Cup for Formula One Manufacturers. The 80-lap race was won by Tyrrell driver Jackie Stewart after he started from fifth position. Peter Revson finished second for the McLaren team and his teammate Denny Hulme came in third.

As the Mont Tremblant circuit had been closed down because of a dispute with the local racing authorities, Mosport Park became the sole host of the Canadian Grand Prix. The circuit had been upgraded to meet modern racing standards.

== Classification ==
=== Qualifying ===
Pos.	No	Driver	Constructor	Time/Gap
1	19	(United States) Peter Revson	McLaren–Ford	1:13.6
2	18	(New Zealand) Denny Hulme	McLaren–Ford	+0.3
3	25	(Sweden) Ronnie Peterson	March–Ford	+0.4
4	5	(Brazil) Emerson Fittipaldi	Lotus–Ford	+0.8
5	1	(United Kingdom) Jackie Stewart	Tyrrell–Ford	+0.8
6	2	(France) François Cevert	Tyrrell–Ford	+0.9
7	11	(Switzerland) Clay Regazzoni	Ferrari	+0.9
8	10	(Belgium) Jacky Ickx	Ferrari	+1.1
9	8	(Argentina) Carlos Reutemann	Brabham–Ford	+1.3
10	4	(New Zealand) Chris Amon	Matra	+1.8
11	9	(Brazil) Wilson Fittipaldi	Brabham–Ford	+2.0
12	16	(United Kingdom) Peter Gethin	BRM	+2.1
13	22	(Australia) Tim Schenken	Surtees–Ford	+2.1
14	15	(New Zealand) Howden Ganley	BRM	+2.1
15	23	(Italy) Andrea de Adamich	Surtees–Ford	+2.3
16	6	(Sweden) Reine Wisell	Lotus–Ford	+2.4
17	7	(United Kingdom) Graham Hill	Brabham–Ford	+2.6
18	29	(Brazil) Carlos Pace	March–Ford	+2.8
19	26	(Austria) Niki Lauda	March–Ford	+3.2
20	14	(France) Jean-Pierre Beltoise	BRM	+3.2
21	28	(France) Henri Pescarolo	March–Ford	+3.4
22	33	(United States) Skip Barber	March–Ford	+3.5
23	17	(Canada) Bill Brack	BRM	+4.3
24	27	(United Kingdom) Mike Beuttler	March–Ford	+4.8
25	31	(United Kingdom) Derek Bell	Tecno	+5.0

=== Race ===
Pos	No	Driver	Constructor	Laps	Time/Retired	Grid	Points
1	1	(United Kingdom) Jackie Stewart	Tyrrell-Ford	80	1:43:16.9	5	9
2	19	(United States) Peter Revson	McLaren-Ford	80	+ 48.2	1	6
3	18	(New Zealand) Denny Hulme	McLaren-Ford	80	+ 54.6	2	4
4	8	(Argentina) Carlos Reutemann	Brabham-Ford	80	+ 1:00.7	9	3
5	11	(Switzerland) Clay Regazzoni	Ferrari	80	+ 1:07.0	7	2
6	4	(New Zealand) Chris Amon	Matra	79	+ 1 lap	10	1
7	22	(Australia) Tim Schenken	Surtees-Ford	79	+ 1 lap	13	
8	7	(United Kingdom) Graham Hill	Brabham-Ford	79	+ 1 lap	17	
9	29	(Brazil) Carlos Pace	March-Ford	78	Out of fuel	18	
10	15	(New Zealand) Howden Ganley	BRM	78	+ 2 laps	14	
11	5	(Brazil) Emerson Fittipaldi	Lotus-Ford	78	+ 2 laps	4	
12	10	(Belgium) Jacky Ickx	Ferrari	76	+ 4 laps	8	
13	28	(France) Henri Pescarolo	March-Ford	73	+ 7 laps	21	
Ret	6	(Sweden) Reine Wisell	Lotus-Ford	65	Engine	16	
DSQ	26	(Austria) Niki Lauda	March-Ford	64	Received outside assistance	19	
DSQ	25	(Sweden) Ronnie Peterson	March-Ford	61	Push start after collision	3	
NC	27	(United Kingdom) Mike Beuttler	March-Ford	59	+ 21 laps	24	
Ret	2	(France) François Cevert	Tyrrell-Ford	51	Gearbox	6	
Ret	16	(United Kingdom) Peter Gethin	BRM	25	Suspension	12	
NC	33	(United States) Skip Barber	March-Ford	24	+ 56 laps	22	
Ret	14	(France) Jean-Pierre Beltoise	BRM	21	Oil leak	20	
Ret	17	(Canada) Bill Brack	BRM	20	Spun off	23	
Ret	9	(Brazil) Wilson Fittipaldi	Brabham-Ford	5	Gearbox	11	
Ret	23	(Italy) Andrea de Adamich	Surtees-Ford	2	Gearbox	15	
DNS	31	(United Kingdom) Derek Bell	Tecno		Practice accident	25	

== Notes ==
- This was the 25th Grand Prix start for British constructor Tyrrell and their 10th Grand Prix win.
- This was the first pole position for a McLaren.
- This was the 50th Grand Prix win for a Ford-powered car. This broke the old record set by Ferrari at the 1972 German Grand Prix, earlier that year.

== Championship standings after the race ==
Drivers' Championship standings

	Pos	Driver	Points
	1	(Brazil) **Emerson Fittipaldi**	61
1	2	(United Kingdom) Jackie Stewart	36
1	3	(New Zealand) Denny Hulme	35
	4	(Belgium) Jacky Ickx	25
	5	(United States) Peter Revson	23

Constructors' Championship standings

Pos	Constructor	Points
1	(United Kingdom) **Lotus-Ford**	61
2	(United Kingdom) McLaren-Ford	45
3	(United Kingdom) Tyrrell-Ford	42
4	(Italy) Ferrari	31
5	(United Kingdom) Surtees-Ford	18

- Note: Only the top five positions are included for both sets of standings.
- Bold text indicates the 1972 World Champions.

Previous race: 1972 Italian Grand Prix	FIA Formula One World Championship; 1972 season	Next race: 1972 United States Grand Prix
Previous race: 1971 Canadian Grand Prix	Canadian Grand Prix	Next race: 1973 Canadian Grand Prix
