= 1972 United States Grand Prix =

Race details
- Date: October 8, 1972
- Official name: XV United States Grand Prix
- Location: Watkins Glen Grand Prix Race Course; Watkins Glen, New York
- Course: Permanent road course
- Course length: 5.435 km (3.377 miles)
- Distance: 59 laps, 320.67 km (199.24 miles)
- Weather: Sunny at start, brief showers late

Pole position
| Driver | (United Kingdom) Jackie Stewart | Tyrrell-Ford |
- Time: 1:40.481

Fastest lap
| Driver | (United Kingdom) Jackie Stewart | Tyrrell-Ford |
- Time: 1:41.644 on lap 33

Podium
| First | (United Kingdom) Jackie Stewart | Tyrrell-Ford |
| Second | (France) François Cevert | Tyrrell-Ford |
| Third | (New Zealand) Denny Hulme | McLaren-Ford |

The 1972 United States Grand Prix was a Formula One motor race held on October 8, 1972, at the Watkins Glen Grand Prix Race Course in Watkins Glen, New York. It was race 12 of 12 in both the 1972 World Championship of Drivers and the 1972 International Cup for Formula One Manufacturers. The 59-lap race was won by Tyrrell driver Jackie Stewart after he started from pole position. His teammate François Cevert finished second and McLaren driver Denny Hulme came in third. This was the debut race of the future world champion Jody Scheckter.

== Summary ==
Jackie Stewart, having just lost his World Champion's crown to Emerson Fittipaldi, asserted his intentions to get it back, as he dominated the entire weekend with pole, win and fastest lap and completed a sweep of the North American races. It was the twenty-second victory of the Scot's career, and his fourth in 1972. Teammate François Cevert completed the one-two finish for Tyrrell, five seconds ahead of Denny Hulme's McLaren.

The then-staggering amount of $275,000 in prize money attracted 31 entries for the last race of the year. Rain and cold winds harried the drivers in qualifying, and Friday's times determined the grid. Stewart took the pole with a time of 1:40.481, ahead of the McLarens of American Peter Revson and Hulme. A third McLaren, driven by South African Jody Scheckter in his F1 debut, was eighth.

The Goodyear teams seemed to be enjoying quite an advantage, some saying as much as one and a half to two seconds per lap in qualifying. Firestone had intended to close its European Racing Division, and their teams were using up old stock that had been produced some time before. Rob Walker said that his team's tires had been manufactured for the Austrian Grand Prix, one of the hottest races of the year, and he was not surprised that they would not work in the 40-degree temperatures at The Glen! After practice, however, a telegram was received from Firestone HQ in Akron saying that, because of all the letters they had received begging them to continue, they would be racing in the following season.

Sunday began bright and sunny, but by the time the cars assembled on the grid, the skies were threatening rain. Stewart jumped quickly off the grid and immediately began to pull away from the rest of the field. Mario Andretti charged from his tenth place grid position up the inside of the first corner in his Ferrari, and banged wheels with Carlos Reutemann's Brabham and Revson's McLaren. Andretti continued, to the delight of the crowd, now in seventh behind the Ferraris of Jacky Ickx and Clay Regazzoni. Reutemann followed in eighth with a broken nose, while Revson pitted at the end of the lap to have his front wing straightened.

Stewart was three seconds clear of Hulme after one lap, and five seconds up after two. Fittipaldi, up to third after the first lap, immediately knew that his car was not right. His right rear tire began deflating on lap five, and when two replacements quickly did the same thing, the team realized that a misaligned suspension was the problem, and he retired. On lap 20, Stewart's lead was 20 seconds, and it was clear that any battle on this day would be for second place.

With Fittipaldi out and Reutemann forced to stop for a new nose cone, the second Tyrrell of François Cevert was now in third and closing on Hulme. Scheckter was comfortably ahead of Ickx, but the Belgian was quickly being caught by Ronnie Peterson. On Saturday, in the rain, Peterson had crashed his March heavily, and the mechanics initially said that it was unrepairable. They decided to attempt to rebuild it in time for the race, and after starting in 26th position, Peterson was now the most impressive driver on the track, apart from race-leader Stewart.

At about half-distance, Cevert got by Hulme for second place, and Peterson passed Ickx for fifth. On lap 40, a brief shower suddenly soaked Turn one. Scheckter, running marvellously in fourth place, was caught out by the slippery surface in the downhill, 90-degree right-hander and spun his McLaren up onto the bank. Ickx, in the meantime, repassed Peterson to take the position vacated by Scheckter. Andretti had been struggling with the performance of his tires, but now found them better on the wet track and increased his pace.

On the last lap, with Stewart coasting home 40 seconds ahead of Cevert, Ickx's Ferrari began trailing smoke. Peterson pulled alongside him and signalled frantically at the back of the car. The Swede's gamesmanship worked, as Peterson beat the Ferrari to the line by just over half a second to take fourth place!

Revson had passed both Andretti and Mike Hailwood on consecutive laps for sixth place, but with five laps remaining, an ignition wire parted and his brilliant drive ended. When Hailwood was unable to avoid the spinning Marches of Mike Beuttler and Niki Lauda just three laps from the flag, Andretti inherited sixth place and the final point.

After the finish, the two leading Tyrrells, plus Patrick Depailler's seventh place sister car, entered the pit lane together in a show of strength, having earned team owner Ken Tyrrell a then-record reward of $97,500.

== Classification ==
=== Qualifying ===
| Pos. | No | Driver | Constructor | Time/Gap |
|---|---|---|---|---|
| 1 | 1 | (United Kingdom) Jackie Stewart | Tyrrell–Ford | 1:40.481 |
| 2 | 20 | (United States) Peter Revson | McLaren–Ford | +0.046 |
| 3 | 19 | (New Zealand) Denny Hulme | McLaren–Ford | +0.603 |
| 4 | 2 | (France) François Cevert | Tyrrell–Ford | +0.964 |
| 5 | 29 | (Argentina) Carlos Reutemann | Brabham–Ford | +1.211 |
| 6 | 8 | (Switzerland) Clay Regazzoni | Ferrari | +1.470 |
| 7 | 18 | (New Zealand) Chris Amon | Matra | +1.498 |
| 8 | 21 | (South Africa) Jody Scheckter | McLaren–Ford | +1.577 |
| 9 | 10 | (Brazil) Emerson Fittipaldi | Lotus–Ford | +1.919 |
| 10 | 9 | (United States) Mario Andretti | Ferrari | +2.001 |
| 11 | 3 | (France) Patrick Depailler | Tyrrell–Ford | +2.040 |
| 12 | 7 | (Belgium) Jacky Ickx | Ferrari | +2.116 |
| 13 | 30 | (Brazil) Wilson Fittipaldi | Brabham–Ford | +2.285 |
| 14 | 23 | (United Kingdom) Mike Hailwood | Surtees–Ford | +2.723 |
| 15 | 27 | (Brazil) Carlos Pace | March–Ford | +2.838 |
| 16 | 12 | (Sweden) Reine Wisell | Lotus–Ford | +3.062 |
| 17 | 16 | (New Zealand) Howden Ganley | BRM | +3.594 |
| 18 | 17 | (France) Jean-Pierre Beltoise | BRM | +3.759 |
| 19 | 25 | (Italy) Andrea de Adamich | Surtees–Ford | +3.798 |
| 20 | 33 | (United States) Skip Barber | March–Ford | +3.799 |
| 21 | 6 | (United Kingdom) Mike Beuttler | March–Ford | +3.888 |
| 22 | 26 | (France) Henri Pescarolo | March–Ford | +3.952 |
| 23 | 34 | (United States) Sam Posey | Surtees–Ford | +4.044 |
| 24 | 15 | (United Kingdom) Brian Redman | BRM | +4.444 |
| 25 | 24 | (United Kingdom) John Surtees^{1} | Surtees–Ford | +4.751 |
| 26 | 5 | (Austria) Niki Lauda | March–Ford | +4.809 |
| 27 | 4 | (Sweden) Ronnie Peterson | March–Ford | +5.661 |
| 28 | 28 | (United Kingdom) Graham Hill | Brabham–Ford | +5.832 |
| 29 | 14 | (United Kingdom) Peter Gethin | BRM | +6.118 |
| 30 | 31 | (United Kingdom) Derek Bell | Tecno | +6.542 |
| 31 | 11 | (Australia) David Walker | Lotus–Ford | +10.119 |
| 32 | 24 | (Australia) Tim Schenken | Surtees–Ford | +17.193 |

- ^1 – Surtees vacated his seat for Tim Schenken prior to the race.

=== Race ===
| Pos | No | Driver | Constructor | Laps | Time/Retired | Grid | Points |
|---|---|---|---|---|---|---|---|
| 1 | 1 | (United Kingdom) Jackie Stewart | Tyrrell-Ford | 59 | 1:41:45.354 | 1 | 9 |
| 2 | 2 | (France) François Cevert | Tyrrell-Ford | 59 | + 32.268 | 4 | 6 |
| 3 | 19 | (New Zealand) Denny Hulme | McLaren-Ford | 59 | + 37.528 | 3 | 4 |
| 4 | 4 | (Sweden) Ronnie Peterson | March-Ford | 59 | + 1:22.516 | 26 | 3 |
| 5 | 7 | (Belgium) Jacky Ickx | Ferrari | 59 | + 1:23.119 | 12 | 2 |
| 6 | 9 | (United States) Mario Andretti | Ferrari | 58 | + 1 lap | 10 | 1 |
| 7 | 3 | (France) Patrick Depailler | Tyrrell-Ford | 58 | + 1 lap | 11 | |
| 8 | 8 | (Switzerland) Clay Regazzoni | Ferrari | 58 | + 1 lap | 6 | |
| 9 | 21 | (South Africa) Jody Scheckter | McLaren-Ford | 58 | + 1 lap | 8 | |
| 10 | 12 | (Sweden) Reine Wisell | Lotus-Ford | 57 | + 2 laps | 16 | |
| 11 | 28 | (United Kingdom) Graham Hill | Brabham-Ford | 57 | + 2 laps | 27 | |
| 12 | 34 | (United States) Sam Posey | Surtees-Ford | 57 | + 2 laps | 23 | |
| 13 | 6 | (United Kingdom) Mike Beuttler | March-Ford | 57 | + 2 laps | 21 | |
| 14 | 26 | (France) Henri Pescarolo | March-Ford | 57 | + 2 laps | 22 | |
| 15 | 18 | (New Zealand) Chris Amon | Matra | 57 | + 2 laps | 7 | |
| 16 | 33 | (United States) Skip Barber | March-Ford | 57 | + 2 laps | 20 | |
| 17 | 23 | (United Kingdom) Mike Hailwood | Surtees-Ford | 56 | Collision | 14 | |
| 18 | 20 | (United States) Peter Revson | McLaren-Ford | 54 | Electrical | 2 | |
| NC | 5 | (Austria) Niki Lauda | March-Ford | 49 | + 10 laps | 25 | |
| Ret | 27 | (Brazil) Carlos Pace | March-Ford | 48 | Fuel system | 15 | |
| Ret | 14 | (United Kingdom) Peter Gethin | BRM | 47 | Engine | 28 | |
| Ret | 16 | (New Zealand) Howden Ganley | BRM | 44 | Engine | 17 | |
| Ret | 11 | (Australia) Dave Walker | Lotus-Ford | 44 | Engine | 30 | |
| Ret | 30 | (Brazil) Wilson Fittipaldi | Brabham-Ford | 43 | Engine | 13 | |
| Ret | 17 | (France) Jean-Pierre Beltoise | BRM | 40 | Ignition | 18 | |
| Ret | 15 | (United Kingdom) Brian Redman | BRM | 34 | Engine | 24 | |
| Ret | 29 | (Argentina) Carlos Reutemann | Brabham-Ford | 31 | Engine | 5 | |
| Ret | 25 | (Italy) Andrea de Adamich | Surtees-Ford | 25 | Collision | 19 | |
| Ret | 24 | (Australia) Tim Schenken | Surtees-Ford | 22 | Suspension | 31 | |
| Ret | 10 | (Brazil) Emerson Fittipaldi | Lotus-Ford | 17 | Suspension | 9 | |
| Ret | 31 | (United Kingdom) Derek Bell | Tecno | 8 | Engine | 29 | |
| DNS | 24 | (United Kingdom) John Surtees | Surtees-Ford | | Driven by Schenken | | |

== Notes ==
- This was the Formula One World Championship debut for South African driver and future World Champion Jody Scheckter.

== Final Championship standings ==
Drivers' Championship standings

| Pos | Driver | Points |
|---|---|---|
| 1 | (Brazil) **Emerson Fittipaldi** | 61 |
| 2 | (United Kingdom) Jackie Stewart | 45 |
| 3 | (New Zealand) Denny Hulme | 39 |
| 4 | (Belgium) Jacky Ickx | 27 |
| 5 | (United States) Peter Revson | 23 |

Constructors' Championship standings

| | Pos | Constructor | Points |
|---|---|---|---|
| | 1 | (United Kingdom) **Lotus-Ford** | 61 |
| 1 | 2 | (United Kingdom) Tyrrell-Ford | 51 |
| 1 | 3 | (United Kingdom) McLaren-Ford | 47 (49) |
| | 4 | (Italy) Ferrari | 33 |
| | 5 | (United Kingdom) Surtees-Ford | 18 |

- Note: Only the top five positions are included for both sets of standings. Only the best 5 results from the first 6 rounds and the best 5 results from the last 6 rounds counted towards the Championship. Numbers without parentheses are Championship points; numbers in parentheses are total points scored.
- Bold text indicates the 1972 World Champions.

| Previous race: 1972 Canadian Grand Prix | FIA Formula One World Championship; 1972 season | Next race: 1973 Argentine Grand Prix |
| Previous race: 1971 United States Grand Prix | United States Grand Prix | Next race: 1973 United States Grand Prix |
