= Surtees TS14 =

Formula One car

Surtees TS14 Surtees TS14A
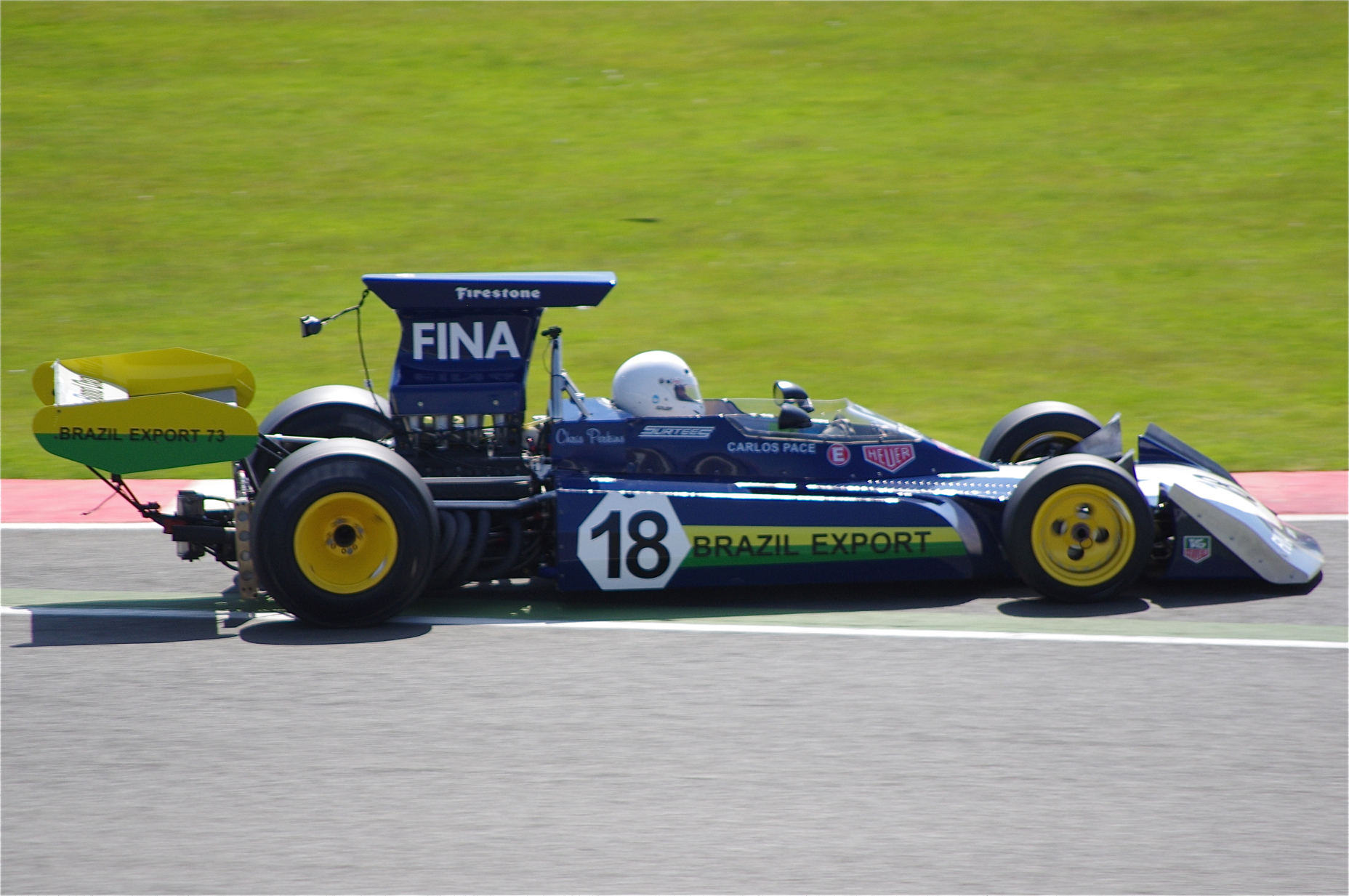
- TS14 showcased at Silverstone Classic in 2012
- Category: Formula One
- Constructor: Surtees
- Designer: John Surtees
- Predecessor: Surtees TS9B
- Successor: Surtees TS16

Technical specifications
- Chassis: Aluminium alloy monocoque
- Axle track: Front: 1,524 mm (60.0 in); Rear: 1,549 mm (61.0 in)
- Wheelbase: 2,565 mm (101.0 in)
- Engine: Ford Cosworth DFV 2,993 cc (182.6 cu in) V8 naturally aspirated Mid-engine, longitudinally mounted
- Transmission: Hewland FG 400 5-speed manual
- Weight: 590 kg (1,300.7 lb)
- Fuel: Duckhams; FINA
- Tyres: Firestone

Competition history
- Notable entrants: Team Surtees; Brooke Bond Oxo Team Surtees
- Notable drivers: (United Kingdom) John Surtees (Australia) Tim Schenken (Brazil) José Carlos Pace (United Kingdom) Mike Hailwood (Germany) Jochen Mass
- Debut: 1972 Italian Grand Prix
Races	Wins	Poles	F/Laps
17	0	0	2
- Unless otherwise stated, all data refer to Formula One World Championship Grands Prix only.

The Surtees TS14 was a Formula One car used by Surtees during the 1972 and 1973 Formula One seasons. It was designed by John Surtees.

== Racing history ==
=== 1972 ===
The TS14 made its debut at the 1972 Italian Grand Prix. Only one chassis was available for English driver and team owner, John Surtees but he retired with fuel system failure. The TS14 was not used for Canada. For the United States, Team Surtees entered two cars. Surtees was joined by Australian Tim Schenken. The Englishman did not start due to an engine shortage and the Australian retired with suspension failure.

=== 1973 ===
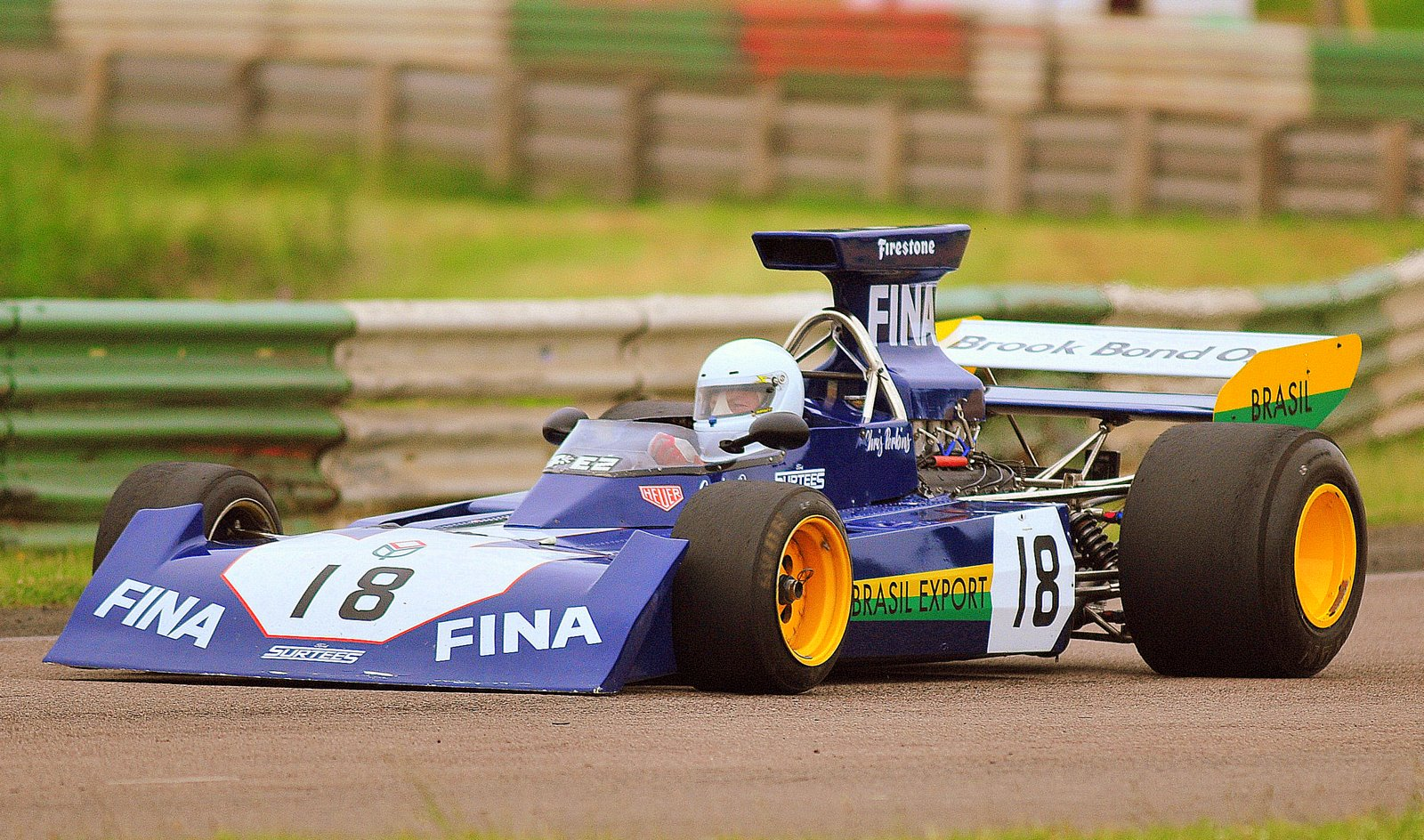
A 1973 TS14 demonstrated at Mallory Park in 2009

For 1973, The Surtees team updated the TS14 into the TS14A and the driver line up was former motorcycle champion, Englishman Mike Hailwood and Brazilian José Carlos Pace. The first race of 1973 was the 1973 Argentine Grand Prix and both drivers retired on the same lap, Hailwood with suspension failure and Pace with a broken halfshaft. At Brazil the Englishman retired with a broken gearbox and the Brazilian at his home track retired with suspension failure. At the South African Grand Prix, both drivers retired with accidents, Pace had a flat tyre and Hailwood crashed with Clay Regazzoni's BRM. Regazzoni's car burst into flames with the unconscious Swiss driver at the wheel. Hailwood dived into the flames, undid Regazzoni's belts and managed to drag him clear. Hailwood was later awarded the George Medal for his bravery. Regazzoni was rushed to hospital but he had only minor burns. Both drivers retired at Spain, the Englishman with an oil leak and the Brazilian with a broken halfshaft. The Belgian Grand Prix saw Pace finish eighth and Hailwood retire with an accident. At Monaco, the Englishman finished eighth and the Brazilian retired with a broken halfshaft. The Swedish Grand Prix saw Hailwood retire with a tyre problem and Pace finished 10th, At France, the Englishman retired with an oil Leak and the Brazilian finished 13th. The British Grand Prix saw Jochen Mass join Pace and Hailwood for a one off drive but all were eliminated in a first lap crash with Jody Scheckter (McLaren), Jean-Pierre Beltoise (BRM), Andrea de Adamich (Brabham), Roger Williamson (March) and the Shadow cars of George Follmer (Works Shadow), Jackie Oliver (Works Shadow) and Graham Hill (privateer Shadow) all involved. Hill was the only one able to drive away from the scene. At Holland, the Englishman retired with an electrical problem and the Brazilian finished seventh. The German Grand Prix saw Mass rejoin the team for a one off drive alongside Pace and Hailwood and all three drivers finished, Pace fourth, Mass seventh and Hailwood 14th. At Austria, the Englishman finished tenth and the Brazilian third. The Italian Grand Prix saw Hailwood seventh and Pace retired with a tyre problem. At Canada, the Englishman finished ninth and the Brazilian retired with wheel problems. The United States Grand Prix saw Mass rejoin the team for a one off drive alongside Pace and Hailwood and all three drivers retired, Pace and Hailwood had suspension failure and Mass with engine failure.

The TS14 was replaced by the Surtees TS16 for the 1974 season.

== Complete Formula One World Championship results ==
(key) (results in italics indicate fastest lap)

Year	Entrant	Chassis	Engines	Tyres	Drivers	1	2	3	4	5	6	7	8	9	10	11	12	13	14	15	Points	WCC
1972	Team Surtees	TS14	Ford Cosworth DFV 3.0 V8	F		ARG	RSA	ESP	MON	BEL	FRA	GBR	GER	AUT	ITA	CAN	USA				18^{1}	5th^{1}
1972	Team Surtees	TS14	Ford Cosworth DFV 3.0 V8	F	John Surtees										Ret		DNS				18^{1}	5th^{1}
1972	Team Surtees	TS14	Ford Cosworth DFV 3.0 V8	F	Tim Schenken												Ret				18^{1}	5th^{1}
1973	Brooke Bond Oxo Team Surtees	TS14A	Ford Cosworth DFV 3.0 V8	F		ARG	BRA	RSA	ESP	BEL	MON	SWE	FRA	GBR	NED	GER	AUT	ITA	CAN	USA	7	7th
1973	Brooke Bond Oxo Team Surtees	TS14A	Ford Cosworth DFV 3.0 V8	F	Mike Hailwood	Ret	Ret	Ret	Ret	Ret	8	Ret	Ret	Ret	Ret	14	10	7	9	Ret	7	7th
1973	Brooke Bond Oxo Team Surtees	TS14A	Ford Cosworth DFV 3.0 V8	F	José Carlos Pace	Ret	Ret	Ret	Ret	8	Ret	10	13	Ret	7	4	3	Ret	Ret	Ret	7	7th
1973	Team Surtees	TS14A	Ford Cosworth DFV 3.0 V8	F	Jochen Mass									Ret		7				Ret	7	7th

^1 All points scored by the Surtees TS9B.

== Non-Championship results ==
(key) (Races in bold indicate pole position) (Races in italics indicate fastest lap)

Year	Entrant	Engine	Driver	Tyres	1	2
1973	Brooke Bond Oxo Team Surtees	Ford Cosworth DFV 3.0 V8		**F**	ROC	INT
1973	Brooke Bond Oxo Team Surtees	Ford Cosworth DFV 3.0 V8	Mike Hailwood	**F**	Ret	Ret
1973	Brooke Bond Oxo Team Surtees	Ford Cosworth DFV 3.0 V8	José Carlos Pace	**F**	DNA	Ret
