= 1973 Austrian Grand Prix =

- The Österreichring (1969-76)

Race details
- Date: 19 August 1973
- Official name: XI Memphis Großer Preis von Osterreich
- Location: Österreichring; Spielberg, Styria, Austria
- Course: Permanent racing facility
- Course length: 5.911 km (3.673 miles)
- Distance: 54 laps, 319.194 km (198.342 miles)

Pole position
Driver	(Brazil) Emerson Fittipaldi	Lotus-Ford
- Time: 1:34.98

Fastest lap
Driver	(Brazil) Carlos Pace	Surtees-Ford
- Time: 1:37.29

Podium
First	(Sweden) Ronnie Peterson	Lotus-Ford
Second	(United Kingdom) Jackie Stewart	Tyrrell-Ford
Third	(Brazil) Carlos Pace	Surtees-Ford

The 1973 Austrian Grand Prix was a Formula One motor race held at Österreichring on 19 August 1973. It was race 12 of 15 in both the 1973 World Championship of Drivers and the 1973 International Cup for Formula One Manufacturers.

The 54-lap race was won by Swedish driver Ronnie Peterson, driving a Lotus-Ford, after he started from second position. Scotland's Jackie Stewart achieved his final podium finish, coming second in his Tyrrell-Ford, while Brazil's Carlos Pace achieved his first, coming third in a Surtees-Ford.

Niki Lauda was forced to miss his home race after breaking his wrist at the Nürburgring two weeks previously. BRM did not replace him for the event.

== Qualifying ==
=== Qualifying classification ===
Pos.	Driver	Constructor	Time	No
1	Emerson Fittipaldi	Lotus-Ford	1:34.98	1
2	Ronnie Peterson	Lotus-Ford	1:35.37	2
3	Denis Hulme	McLaren-Ford	1:35.69	3
4	Peter Revson	McLaren-Ford	1:35.86	4
5	Carlos Reutemann	Brabham-Ford	1:36.01	5
6	Arturo Merzario	Ferrari	1:36.42	6
7	Jackie Stewart	Tyrrell-Ford	1:36.44	7
8	Carlos Pace	Surtees-Ford	1:36.48	8
9	James Hunt	March-Ford	1:36.63	9
10	François Cevert	Tyrrell-Ford	1:36.77	10
11	Mike Beuttler	March-Ford	1:36.83	11
12	Jean-Pierre Jarier	March-Ford	1:36.93	12
13	Jean-Pierre Beltoise	BRM	1:37.46	13
14	Clay Regazzoni	BRM	1:37.52	14
15	Mike Hailwood	Surtees-Ford	1:37.60	15
16	Wilson Fittipaldi	Brabham-Ford	1:37.81	16
17	Rolf Stommelen	Brabham-Ford	1:37.85	17
18	Jackie Oliver	Shadow-Ford	1:37.97	18
19	Rikky von Opel	Ensign-Ford	1:38.22	19
20	George Follmer	Shadow-Ford	1:38.30	20
21	Howden Ganley	Iso-Ford	1:39.38	21
22	Graham Hill	Shadow-Ford	1:39.50	22
23	Chris Amon	Tecno	1:40.39	DNS
24	Gijs van Lennep	Iso-Ford	1:41.04	23

== Race ==
=== Classification ===
Pos	No	Driver	Constructor	Laps	Time/Retired	Grid	Points
1	2	(Sweden) Ronnie Peterson	Lotus-Ford	54	1:28:48.78	2	9
2	5	(United Kingdom) Jackie Stewart	Tyrrell-Ford	54	+ 9.01	7	6
3	24	(Brazil) Carlos Pace	Surtees-Ford	54	+ 46.64	8	4
4	10	(Argentina) Carlos Reutemann	Brabham-Ford	54	+ 47.91	5	3
5	20	(France) Jean-Pierre Beltoise	BRM	54	+ 1:21.30	13	2
6	19	(Switzerland) Clay Regazzoni	BRM	54	+ 1:38.40	14	1
7	4	(Italy) Arturo Merzario	Ferrari	53	+ 1 Lap	6	
8	7	(New Zealand) Denny Hulme	McLaren-Ford	53	+ 1 Lap	3	
9	26	(Netherlands) Gijs van Lennep	Iso-Marlboro-Ford	52	+ 2 Laps	23	
10	23	(United Kingdom) Mike Hailwood	Surtees-Ford	49	+ 5 Laps	15	
Ret	1	(Brazil) Emerson Fittipaldi	Lotus-Ford	48	Fuel System	1	
NC	25	(New Zealand) Howden Ganley	Iso-Marlboro-Ford	44	+ 10 Laps	21	
Ret	18	(France) Jean-Pierre Jarier	March-Ford	37	Engine	12	
Ret	28	(Liechtenstein) Rikky von Opel	Ensign-Ford	34	Fuel System	19	
Ret	11	(Brazil) Wilson Fittipaldi	Brabham-Ford	31	Fuel System	16	
Ret	12	(United Kingdom) Graham Hill	Shadow-Ford	28	Suspension	22	
Ret	16	(United States) George Follmer	Shadow-Ford	23	Differential	20	
Ret	9	(Germany) Rolf Stommelen	Brabham-Ford	21	Wheel	17	
Ret	17	(United Kingdom) Jackie Oliver	Shadow-Ford	9	Fuel System	18	
Ret	6	(France) François Cevert	Tyrrell-Ford	6	Suspension	10	
Ret	27	(United Kingdom) James Hunt	March-Ford	3	Injection	9	
Ret	8	(United States) Peter Revson	McLaren-Ford	0	Clutch	4	
Ret	15	(United Kingdom) Mike Beuttler	March-Ford	0	Collision	11	
DNS	22	(New Zealand) Chris Amon	Tecno				
DNS	21	(Austria) Niki Lauda	BRM				

== Notes ==
- This was Jackie Stewart's 43rd and last podium finish. This record would stand until it was beaten by Carlos Reutemann at the 1981 Italian Grand Prix.

== Championship standings after the race ==
Drivers' Championship standings

Pos	Driver	Points
1	(United Kingdom) **Jackie Stewart***	66
2	(France) **François Cevert***	45
3	(Brazil) **Emerson Fittipaldi***	42
4	(Sweden) Ronnie Peterson	34
5	(United States) Peter Revson	23

Constructors' Championship standings

Pos	Constructor	Points
1	(United Kingdom) **Tyrrell-Ford***	77 (81)
2	(United Kingdom) **Lotus-Ford***	68 (72)
3	(United Kingdom) McLaren-Ford	42
4	(United Kingdom) Brabham-Ford	17
5	(Italy) Ferrari	12

- Note: Only the top five positions are included for both sets of standings. Only the best 7 results from the first 8 races and the best 6 results from the last 7 races counted towards the Championship. Numbers without parentheses are Championship points; numbers in parentheses are total points scored.
- Competitors in bold and marked with an asterisk still had a theoretical chance of becoming World Champion.

Previous race: 1973 German Grand Prix	FIA Formula One World Championship; 1973 season	Next race: 1973 Italian Grand Prix
Previous race: 1972 Austrian Grand Prix	Austrian Grand Prix	Next race: 1974 Austrian Grand Prix
