= 1973 Formula One season =

27th season of FIA Formula One motor racing

The 1973 Formula One season was the 27th season of FIA Formula One motor racing. It featured the 1973 World Championship of Drivers and the 1973 International Cup for F1 Manufacturers, which were contested concurrently over a fifteen-race series that commenced on 28 January and ended on 7 October. The season also included two non-championship races which were open to both Formula One and Formula 5000 cars.

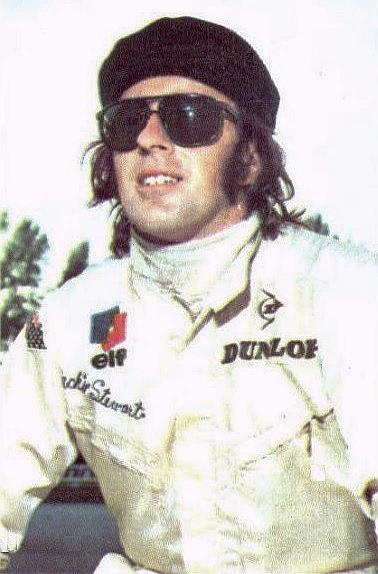
Jackie Stewart (pictured in 1970) won his third and final Drivers' Championship driving for Tyrrell-Ford in his final year in Formula One.

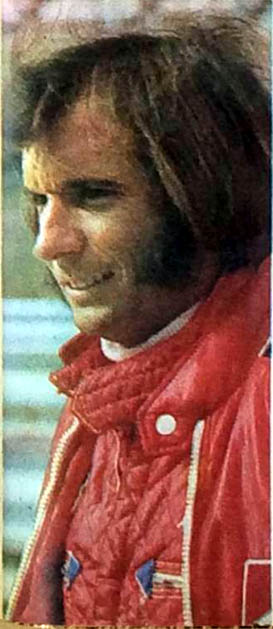
Defending Drivers' Champion Emerson Fittipaldi (pictured in 1974) finished second, driving for Lotus-Ford.

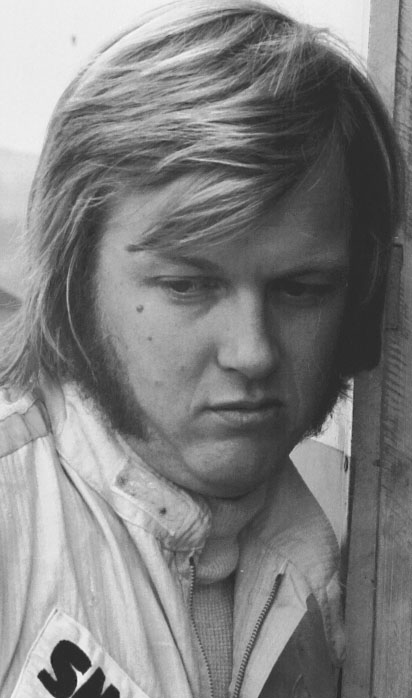
Fittipaldi's teammate Ronnie Peterson finished third in the standings..

The World Championship of Drivers was won by Jackie Stewart, driving for Elf Team Tyrrell, for the third time. The International Cup for F1 Manufacturers was awarded to John Player Team Lotus. At the final race of the season, Stewart's teammate François Cevert crashed during Saturday practice and was killed instantly. The Tyrrell team withdrew from the race, handing the Manufacturers' title to Lotus. Subsequently, Stewart made public his decision to retire, but he had decided on this already earlier.

British driver Roger Williamson was also killed during the season, in a tragic crash at the Dutch Grand Prix where marshals arrived too late on the scene and fellow driver David Purley was unable to free Williamson from the burning wreck.

== Drivers and constructors ==
The following teams and drivers contested the 1973 World Championship.

Entrant	Constructor	Chassis	Engine	Tyre	Driver	Rounds
(United Kingdom) John Player Team Lotus	Lotus-Ford	72D; 72E	Ford Cosworth DFV 3.0 V8	G	(Brazil) Emerson Fittipaldi	All
(United Kingdom) John Player Team Lotus	Lotus-Ford	72D; 72E	Ford Cosworth DFV 3.0 V8	G	(Sweden) Ronnie Peterson	All
(United Kingdom) Elf Team Tyrrell	Elf Tyrrell-Ford	005; 006	Ford Cosworth DFV 3.0 V8	G	(United Kingdom) Jackie Stewart	All
(United Kingdom) Elf Team Tyrrell	Elf Tyrrell-Ford	005; 006	Ford Cosworth DFV 3.0 V8	G	(France) François Cevert	All
(United Kingdom) Elf Team Tyrrell	Elf Tyrrell-Ford	005; 006	Ford Cosworth DFV 3.0 V8	G	(New Zealand) Chris Amon	14–15
(United Kingdom) Motor Racing Developments (United Kingdom) Ceramica Pagnossin Team MRD (United Kingdom) Hexagon of Highgate	Brabham-Ford	BT37; BT42	Ford Cosworth DFV 3.0 V8	G	(Argentina) Carlos Reutemann	All
(United Kingdom) Motor Racing Developments (United Kingdom) Ceramica Pagnossin Team MRD (United Kingdom) Hexagon of Highgate	Brabham-Ford	BT37; BT42	Ford Cosworth DFV 3.0 V8	G	(Brazil) Wilson Fittipaldi	All
(United Kingdom) Motor Racing Developments (United Kingdom) Ceramica Pagnossin Team MRD (United Kingdom) Hexagon of Highgate	Brabham-Ford	BT37; BT42	Ford Cosworth DFV 3.0 V8	G	(Italy) Andrea de Adamich	4–6, 8–9
(United Kingdom) Motor Racing Developments (United Kingdom) Ceramica Pagnossin Team MRD (United Kingdom) Hexagon of Highgate	Brabham-Ford	BT37; BT42	Ford Cosworth DFV 3.0 V8	G	(West Germany) Rolf Stommelen	11–14
(United Kingdom) Motor Racing Developments (United Kingdom) Ceramica Pagnossin Team MRD (United Kingdom) Hexagon of Highgate	Brabham-Ford	BT37; BT42	Ford Cosworth DFV 3.0 V8	G	(United Kingdom) John Watson	9, 15
(United Kingdom) Yardley Team McLaren	McLaren-Ford	M19A; M19C; M23	Ford Cosworth DFV 3.0 V8	G	(New Zealand) Denny Hulme	All
(United Kingdom) Yardley Team McLaren	McLaren-Ford	M19A; M19C; M23	Ford Cosworth DFV 3.0 V8	G	(United States) Peter Revson	1–7, 9–15
(United Kingdom) Yardley Team McLaren	McLaren-Ford	M19A; M19C; M23	Ford Cosworth DFV 3.0 V8	G	(South Africa) Jody Scheckter	3, 8–9, 14–15
(United Kingdom) Yardley Team McLaren	McLaren-Ford	M19A; M19C; M23	Ford Cosworth DFV 3.0 V8	G	(Belgium) Jacky Ickx	11
(Italy) Scuderia Ferrari SpA SEFAC	Ferrari	312B2; 312B3	Ferrari 001/1 3.0 F12; Ferrari 001/11 3.0 F12	G	(Belgium) Jacky Ickx	1–9, 13
(Italy) Scuderia Ferrari SpA SEFAC	Ferrari	312B2; 312B3	Ferrari 001/1 3.0 F12; Ferrari 001/11 3.0 F12	G	(Italy) Arturo Merzario	1–3, 6, 8, 12–15
(United Kingdom) Clarke-Mordaunt-Guthrie Racing (Sweden) Team Pierre Robert	March-Ford	721G; 731	Ford Cosworth DFV 3.0 V8	F G	(United Kingdom) Mike Beuttler	1–7, 9–15
(United Kingdom) Clarke-Mordaunt-Guthrie Racing (Sweden) Team Pierre Robert	March-Ford	721G; 731	Ford Cosworth DFV 3.0 V8	F G	(Sweden) Reine Wisell	7–8
(United Kingdom) STP March Racing Team (United Kingdom) STP March / Wheatcroft Racing (United Kingdom) March Racing Team	March-Ford	721G; 731	Ford Cosworth DFV 3.0 V8	G	(France) Jean-Pierre Jarier	1–3, 5–8, 12, 14–15
(United Kingdom) STP March Racing Team (United Kingdom) STP March / Wheatcroft Racing (United Kingdom) March Racing Team	March-Ford	721G; 731	Ford Cosworth DFV 3.0 V8	G	(France) Henri Pescarolo	4
(United Kingdom) STP March Racing Team (United Kingdom) STP March / Wheatcroft Racing (United Kingdom) March Racing Team	March-Ford	721G; 731	Ford Cosworth DFV 3.0 V8	G	(United Kingdom) Roger Williamson	9–10
(United Kingdom) Brooke Bond Oxo - Rob Walker Team Surtees (United Kingdom) Brooke Bond Oxo Team Surtees (United Kingdom) Ceramica Pagnossin Team Surtees (United Kingdom) Team Surtees	Surtees FINA-Ford	TS9A; TS9B; TS14A	Ford Cosworth DFV 3.0 V8	F	(United Kingdom) Mike Hailwood	All
(United Kingdom) Brooke Bond Oxo - Rob Walker Team Surtees (United Kingdom) Brooke Bond Oxo Team Surtees (United Kingdom) Ceramica Pagnossin Team Surtees (United Kingdom) Team Surtees	Surtees FINA-Ford	TS9A; TS9B; TS14A	Ford Cosworth DFV 3.0 V8	F	(Brazil) Carlos Pace	All
(United Kingdom) Brooke Bond Oxo - Rob Walker Team Surtees (United Kingdom) Brooke Bond Oxo Team Surtees (United Kingdom) Ceramica Pagnossin Team Surtees (United Kingdom) Team Surtees	Surtees FINA-Ford	TS9A; TS9B; TS14A	Ford Cosworth DFV 3.0 V8	F	(Brazil) Luiz Bueno	2
(United Kingdom) Brooke Bond Oxo - Rob Walker Team Surtees (United Kingdom) Brooke Bond Oxo Team Surtees (United Kingdom) Ceramica Pagnossin Team Surtees (United Kingdom) Team Surtees	Surtees FINA-Ford	TS9A; TS9B; TS14A	Ford Cosworth DFV 3.0 V8	F	(Italy) Andrea de Adamich	3
(United Kingdom) Brooke Bond Oxo - Rob Walker Team Surtees (United Kingdom) Brooke Bond Oxo Team Surtees (United Kingdom) Ceramica Pagnossin Team Surtees (United Kingdom) Team Surtees	Surtees FINA-Ford	TS9A; TS9B; TS14A	Ford Cosworth DFV 3.0 V8	F	(West Germany) Jochen Mass	9, 11, 15
(United Kingdom) Marlboro BRM	BRM	P160C; P160D	BRM P142 3.0 V12	F	(France) Jean-Pierre Beltoise	All
(United Kingdom) Marlboro BRM	BRM	P160C; P160D	BRM P142 3.0 V12	F	(Switzerland) Clay Regazzoni	1–13, 15
(United Kingdom) Marlboro BRM	BRM	P160C; P160D	BRM P142 3.0 V12	F	(Austria) Niki Lauda	All
(United Kingdom) Marlboro BRM	BRM	P160C; P160D	BRM P142 3.0 V12	F	(United Kingdom) Peter Gethin	14
(United Kingdom) Frank Williams Racing Cars	Iso-Marlboro-Ford	FX3B; IR	Ford Cosworth DFV 3.0 V8	F	(Italy) Nanni Galli	1–2, 4–6
(United Kingdom) Frank Williams Racing Cars	Iso-Marlboro-Ford	FX3B; IR	Ford Cosworth DFV 3.0 V8	F	(New Zealand) Howden Ganley	All
(United Kingdom) Frank Williams Racing Cars	Iso-Marlboro-Ford	FX3B; IR	Ford Cosworth DFV 3.0 V8	F	(South Africa) Jackie Pretorius	3
(United Kingdom) Frank Williams Racing Cars	Iso-Marlboro-Ford	FX3B; IR	Ford Cosworth DFV 3.0 V8	F	(Denmark) Tom Belsø	7
(United Kingdom) Frank Williams Racing Cars	Iso-Marlboro-Ford	FX3B; IR	Ford Cosworth DFV 3.0 V8	F	(France) Henri Pescarolo	8, 11
(United Kingdom) Frank Williams Racing Cars	Iso-Marlboro-Ford	FX3B; IR	Ford Cosworth DFV 3.0 V8	F	(New Zealand) Graham McRae	9
(United Kingdom) Frank Williams Racing Cars	Iso-Marlboro-Ford	FX3B; IR	Ford Cosworth DFV 3.0 V8	F	(Netherlands) Gijs van Lennep	10, 12–13
(United Kingdom) Frank Williams Racing Cars	Iso-Marlboro-Ford	FX3B; IR	Ford Cosworth DFV 3.0 V8	F	(Australia) Tim Schenken	14
(United Kingdom) Frank Williams Racing Cars	Iso-Marlboro-Ford	FX3B; IR	Ford Cosworth DFV 3.0 V8	F	(Belgium) Jacky Ickx	15
(United States) UOP Shadow Racing	Shadow-Ford	DN1	Ford Cosworth DFV 3.0 V8	G	(United Kingdom) Jackie Oliver	3–15
(United States) UOP Shadow Racing	Shadow-Ford	DN1	Ford Cosworth DFV 3.0 V8	G	(United States) George Follmer	3–15
(United States) UOP Shadow Racing	Shadow-Ford	DN1	Ford Cosworth DFV 3.0 V8	G	(United Kingdom) Brian Redman	15
(South Africa) Scribante Lucky Strike Racing	Lotus-Ford	72D	Ford Cosworth DFV 3.0 V8	F	(South Africa) Dave Charlton	3
(South Africa) Blignaut Lucky Strike Racing	Tyrrell-Ford	004	Ford Cosworth DFV 3.0 V8	G	(South Africa) Eddie Keizan	3
(United Kingdom) Embassy Racing	Shadow-Ford	DN1	Ford Cosworth DFV 3.0 V8	G	(United Kingdom) Graham Hill	4–15
(Italy) Martini Racing Team	Tecno	PA123/6	Tecno Series-P 3.0 F12	F	(New Zealand) Chris Amon	5–6, 9–10, 12
(United Kingdom) LEC Refrigeration Racing	March-Ford	731	Ford Cosworth DFV 3.0 V8	G	(United Kingdom) David Purley	6, 9–11, 13
(United Kingdom) Hesketh Racing	March-Ford	731	Ford Cosworth DFV 3.0 V8	G	(United Kingdom) James Hunt	6, 8–10, 12–15
(United Kingdom) Team Ensign	Ensign-Ford	N173	Ford Cosworth DFV 3.0 V8	F	(Liechtenstein) Rikky von Opel	8–10, 12–15

=== Team and driver changes ===
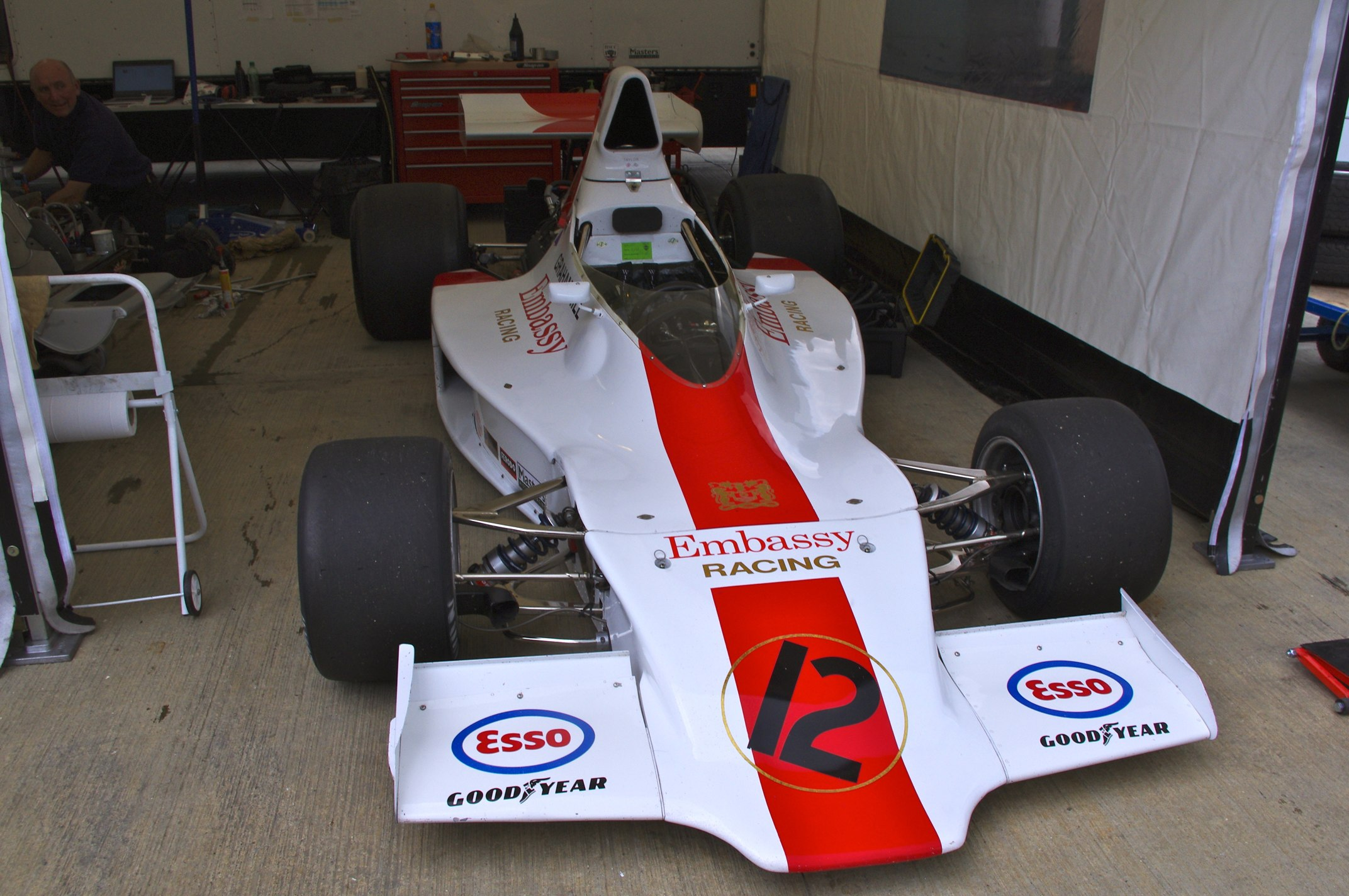
Graham Hill bought a chassis from the new Shadow team and painted it in his Embassy Racing colours.

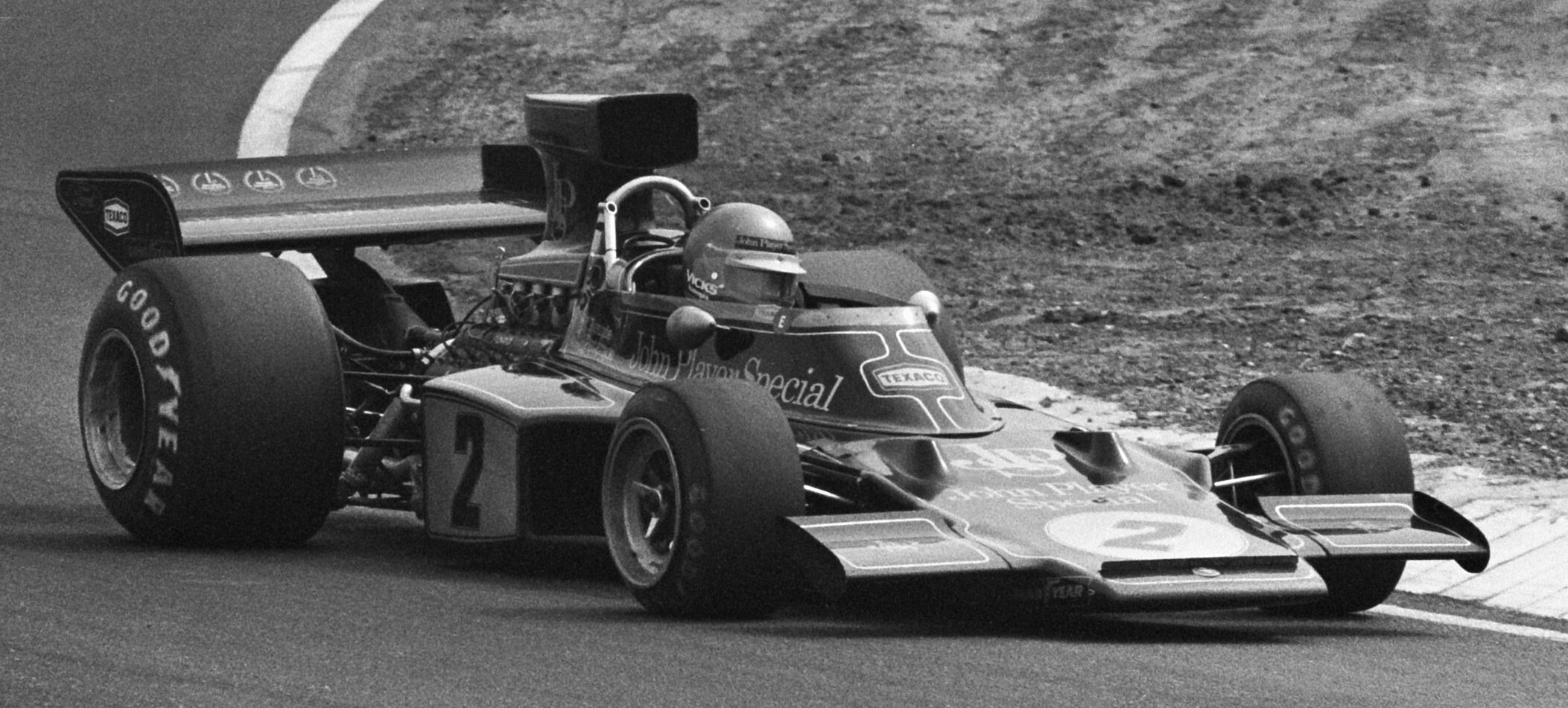
Ronnie Peterson driving for Team Lotus at the Dutch Grand Prix.

There were relatively few changes in the top teams, but no less than usual further down the order:

- The factory-backed Matra team had withdrawn from Formula One. They had already reduced their operations to one car before the 1972 season and, after the season, packed up all-together, making the 1973 season the first season without a participation of any French constructor since 1966.
- After the departure of Eagle in the 1969 season, no American constructor competed in Formula One for three seasons until the arrival of Shadow during this season with backing from Universal Oil Products and technical support from ex-BRM designer Tony Southgate. The team held an American licence until the 1976 season, but was based in Britain throughout its participation in Formula One. Shadow brought their Can-Am driver Jackie Oliver with them and signed 1972 Can-Am champion George Follmer. In addition to running their own works team, Shadow also sold a chassis to Graham Hill's new privateer team Embassy Racing.
- Lotus signed Ronnie Peterson from March.
- Hill had moved from Brabham, where Andrea de Adamich took his place. The Italian came from Surtees, where Carlos Pace found a new home.
- After Pace and Henri Pescarolo left, Frank Williams had to find two new drivers: Howden Ganley from BRM and Nanni Galli from Tecno. Tecno signed Matra's last driver, Chris Amon.
- BRM signed Clay Regazzoni and Niki Lauda, next to Jean-Pierre Beltoise. This was a golden trio of drivers, but they would only manage to gain twelve points and the team finished seventh in the Manufacturers' championship. A slight consolidation for Regazzoni, who had left Ferrari over the winter, was that the Italian squad finished just one place higher, on the same amount of points.
- After Peterson and Lauda had left March, they signed Jean-Pierre Jarier. He was due to drive for them in Formula Two, but was given a Formula One seat as well. His F1 season would turn out difficult, only classifying once during the year, but he managed to rack up the Formula Two title in dominant fashion.

==== Mid-season changes ====
- Future world champion James Hunt debuted at the Monaco Grand Prix, driving a privateer March 731 entered by Hesketh Racing. It was also the team's championship debut.
- Also debuting that race was David Purley for LEC Refrigeration Racing, his own team sponsored by his family's refrigeration company. Like Hunt, he hired a March 731. Sadly, he is mostly known for his failed rescue attempt of Roger Williamson (see below). The LEC team returned with their own chassis in 1977.
- After five races, Nanni Galli announced his retirement. His place at the team of Frank Williams was taken up by seven different drivers in the remaining part of the season.
- 1972 British F3 champion Rikky von Opel commissioned a Formula One chassis for his F3 team Ensign. They debuted in the French Grand Prix.
- The British Grand Prix saw the debut of two-time British F3 champion Roger Williamson. In only his second race, the Dutch Grand Prix, he crashed and died in the subsequent fire.
- Rolf Stommelen returned to Formula One to take the place of Andrea de Adamich at Brabham. The Italian was heavily injured in a pile-up at Silverstone. It took thirty minutes to extract him from his car.
- The Tecno team folded with three races to go, after several disputes created a toxic atmosphere. Driver Chris Amon moved to Tyrrell and started preparations for his own racing team.

== Calendar ==
Round	Grand Prix	Circuit	Date
1	Argentine Grand Prix	(Argentina) Autódromo de Buenos Aires, Buenos Aires	28 January
2	Brazilian Grand Prix	(Brazil) Autodromo de Interlagos, São Paulo	11 February
3	South African Grand Prix	(South Africa) Kyalami Grand Prix Circuit, Midrand	3 March
4	Spanish Grand Prix	(Spain) Montjuïc Circuit, Barcelona	29 April
5	Belgian Grand Prix	(Belgium) Circuit Zolder, Heusden-Zolder	20 May
6	Monaco Grand Prix	Circuit de Monaco, Monte Carlo	3 June
7	Swedish Grand Prix	(Sweden) Scandinavian Raceway, Anderstorp	17 June
8	French Grand Prix	(France) Circuit Paul Ricard, Le Castellet	1 July
9	British Grand Prix	(United Kingdom) Silverstone Circuit, Silverstone	14 July
10	Dutch Grand Prix	(Netherlands) Circuit Park Zandvoort, Zandvoort	29 July
11	German Grand Prix	(West Germany) Nürburgring, Nürburg	5 August
12	Austrian Grand Prix	(Austria) Österreichring, Spielberg	19 August
13	Italian Grand Prix	(Italy) Autodromo Nazionale di Monza, Monza	9 September
14	Canadian Grand Prix	(Canada) Mosport Park, Bowmanville	23 September
15	United States Grand Prix	(United States) Watkins Glen International, New York	7 October

=== Calendar changes ===
The calendar was expanded from 12 to 15 races:

- The Brazilian Grand Prix was held for the first time, at Autodromo de Interlagos, and the Swedish Grand Prix was held for the first time, at the Scandinavian Raceway in Anderstorp.
- The Dutch Grand Prix returned to the calendar after it had been cancelled in 1972 due to safety upgrades that were not completed in time. The upgrades included new asphalt, new barriers, a change in the circuit's layout and a new race control tower.

Other changes:

- The Belgian Grand Prix and Monaco Grand Prix swapped places on the calendar so that the Monaco round came second. The Belgian round also carried the unofficial title of European Grand Prix for 1973.
- The Spanish Grand Prix was moved from Jarama near Madrid to the Montjuïc street circuit in Barcelona, in keeping with the event-sharing arrangement between the two circuits. Likewise, the Belgian Grand Prix was moved from Nivelles-Baulers to Circuit Zolder, and the British Grand Prix was moved from Brands Hatch to Silverstone.
- The French Grand Prix was moved from Circuit de Charade to Circuit Paul Ricard.

== Regulation changes ==
=== Technical regulations ===
- The minimum weight was increased from 550 kilograms (1,210 lb) to 575 kilograms (1,268 lb).

=== Sporting regulations ===
- Drivers started doing a full warm-up lap before the race. Previously, they would form a dummy grid, a short distance behind an official grid, and the cars would simply move from one to the other to begin the race (the German Grand Prix, however, was the only one to continue this traditional practice until 1976, due to the immense length of the Nürburgring circuit, which spanned 22.8 kilometers).
- The numbering system for teams was formalised:
  - From the second race of the season, the Brazilian Grand Prix, on, teammates were paired: the Lotus drivers were given 1 and 2, Tyrrell's drivers 3 and 4, and so on. The numbers assigned to each team did still change for a couple of races.
  - Ahead of the fifth race on the calendar, the Belgian Grand Prix, the order was set for the rest of the year.
  - And then for the 1974 season, the numbers were assigned based on finishing positions in the 1973 Manufacturers' championship. After this, teams did not change numbers, unless they won the Drivers' championship or signed the reigning Drivers' champion, or if they or another team dropped out of the competition.
- The 1973 season saw the intervention of a Safety Car in Formula One for the first time, in the form of a Porsche 914 at the Canadian Grand Prix. However, the concept of a safety car would not be officially introduced until twenty years later, in 1993.

== Championship report ==
=== Rounds 1 to 4 ===
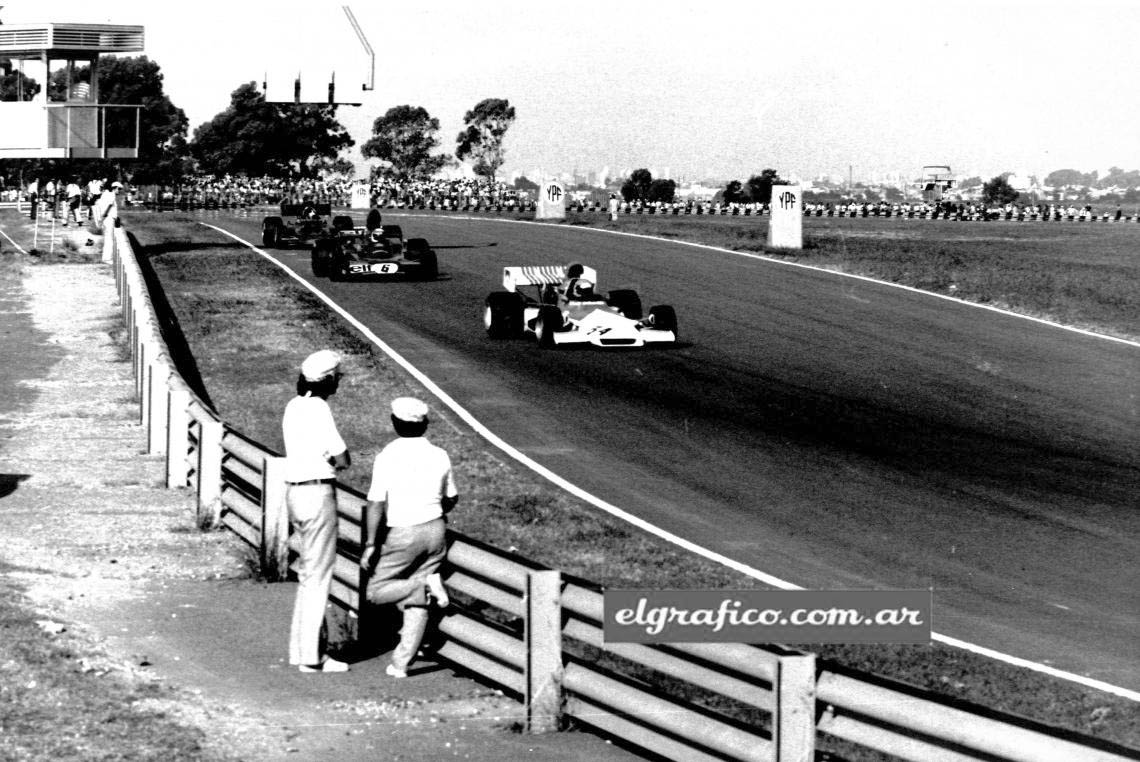
Future champion Niki Lauda shortly led the Argentine Grand Prix.

Like last year, the championship commenced in January in Argentina. Swiss driver Clay Regazzoni had left Ferrari after three years, having scored just one podium finish in 1972. He was attracted by the Marlboro-sponsored British Racing Motors team for "an astronomical fee" and delivered early success: he qualified on pole position, ahead of reigning champion Emerson Fittipaldi in the Lotus and last year's teammate Jacky Ickx. But on Sunday, it was sixth-starting François Cevert that took his rivals by surprise: he snatched the lead even before the first corner, before being passed by the pole sitter later in the lap. For the first quarter of the race, five drivers formed a tight leading pack: Regazzoni, Cevert, Fittipaldi, new Lotus driver Ronnie Peterson and 1971 champion Jackie Stewart. But then, with his Firestone tyres overheating, Regazzoni fell back to fifth, while Stewart's conservative start allowed him to get up to second place. Going into the tail end of the race, Fittipaldi overtook Stewart, much to the joy of the South American fans, and set a new lap record in his chase for Cevert. After 50 laps in the lead, the Frenchman had to surrender first position and eventually finished 5 seconds behind his Brazilian rival. Stewart came home in third.

After an inspired promotional campaign, São Paulo were selected to host the first ever World Championship Brazilian Grand Prix. Team Lotus dominated practice and qualified 1–2, but it was Peterson ahead of Fittipaldi. Ickx started next to them in third. The Tyrrells of Stewart and Cevert could only managed eighth and ninth, respectively. At the start, however, the Scot jumped up to third, behind Fittipaldi and another local hero with a good start, Carlos Pace. Peterson fell back to fourth and then, on lap 6, had a crash due to high right rear wheel collapsing. Pace then retired with suspension damage. Fittipaldi finished with a comfortable lead over Stewart. McLaren driver Denny Hulme was third.

Staying on the Southern Hemisphere but moving almost 7,500 km (4,700 mi) on, Kyalami hosted the South African Grand Prix. In practice, Jackie Stewart was going faster and faster until he suffered a dramatic brake failure and spun backwards through three layers of chain link fence. He was unhurt, so his biggest grief came from being unable to defend his time: with the first thirteen drivers separated by less than a second, the Scot was relegated to the sixteenth place on the grid. Denny Hulme achieved pole position, ahead of Emerson Fittipaldi and local driver Jody Scheckter. The start of the race was rather calm, but on lap 3, Clay Regazzoni crashed into a stationary Mike Hailwood. Both cars burst into flames and Regazzoni was unconscious. Hailwood did not hesitate to rescue him and managed to release the Swiss driver's seat belts. His overalls caught on fire, so he turned to a marshal with a fire extinguisher and then continued to drag Regazzoni from the wrecked BRM. Meanwhile, leader Hulme had to pit twice with punctures, but Stewart was performing a miraculous recovery drive: he was up to sixth place on lap 6, and was leading the race on lap 7. American driver Peter Revson in his McLaren overtook Fittipaldi for second place and managed to stay there. Scheckter retired with just four laps to go. At least three drivers reported Stewart for overtaking under yellow flags and McLaren's team boss filed the official protest. The stewards handed the Scot a severe reprimand but the race results were upheld.

The Spanish Grand Prix was held on Barcelona's street circuit that combined tight hairpins with high-speed blind corners, resulting in average speeds of over 160 km/h (99 mph). Peterson qualified on pole position, ahead of Hulme and Cevert. Stewart and Fittipaldi started fourth and seventh, respectively. Around a quarter distance, Hulme and Cevert had to pit with damage and the Swede at the front achieved a comfortable lead. On lap 55, however, his gearbox failed and his Lotus ground to a halt. Stewart retired with brake problems and Fittipaldi endured a slow puncture. Carlos Reutemann, smelling a sudden victory, was chasing down his fellow Brazilian until his driveshaft failed. So the championship leader held on to victory, ahead of François Cevert for Tyrrell and George Follmer in the Shadow.

In the Drivers' Championship, Emerson Fittipaldi (31 points) held a sizable lead over Jackie Stewart (19) and François Cevert (12). Lotus (31 points) was leading in the standings for the Manufacturers' Cup, ahead of Tyrrell (27) and McLaren (15).

=== Rounds 5 to 8 ===
The Belgian Grand Prix was held at Circuit Zolder for the first time, as part of the 1972 agreement to alternate with Nivelles-Baulers. The track was prepared for the event too late and after an hour of practice, the drivers' union (GPDA) were threatening with a strike action, complaining that the tarmac was breaking up. After a quick resurfacing job on Friday evening, the track held together during Saturday practice, but now was very slippery, and there was a lot of sand off the racing line. Ronnie Peterson qualified his Lotus on pole position and held the lead at the start, but was passed by fourth-starting François Cevert (Tyrrell) on the second lap. Championship rivals Jackie Stewart (Tyrrell) and Emerson Fittipaldi (Lotus) had started in sixth and ninth, respectively, but quickly charged through the field. After Cevert spun off on lap 20 and rejoined down in eighth, they were fighting for the lead, with the Scot coming out on top. When Fittipaldi had to slow with fuel pressure problems, he had to settle for third, while Cevert recovered to second position.

The Monaco Grand Prix was held on a heavily revised circuit, the layout becoming even twistier and slower than before. Stewart qualified on pole position, ahead of Peterson, but it was Cevert who took the lead at the start. Clay Regazzoni moved his BRM ahead of Stewart, going up from eighth to third, and this became second when Cevert hit a kerbstone and punctured his tyre. On lap 6, however, he locked up coming out of the tunnel and had to make a pit stop. Now Stewart could start chasing down Peterson. When the Swede's Lotus started suffering from dropping fuel pressure, the lead was easily taken and Stewart steadily increased his lead. Fittipaldi got by his teammate for second position, but did not manage to put up a real fight with Stewart. The pair finished within 1.3 seconds of each other, while they lapped the rest of the field, making abundantly clear that they would be the championship contenders for this year.

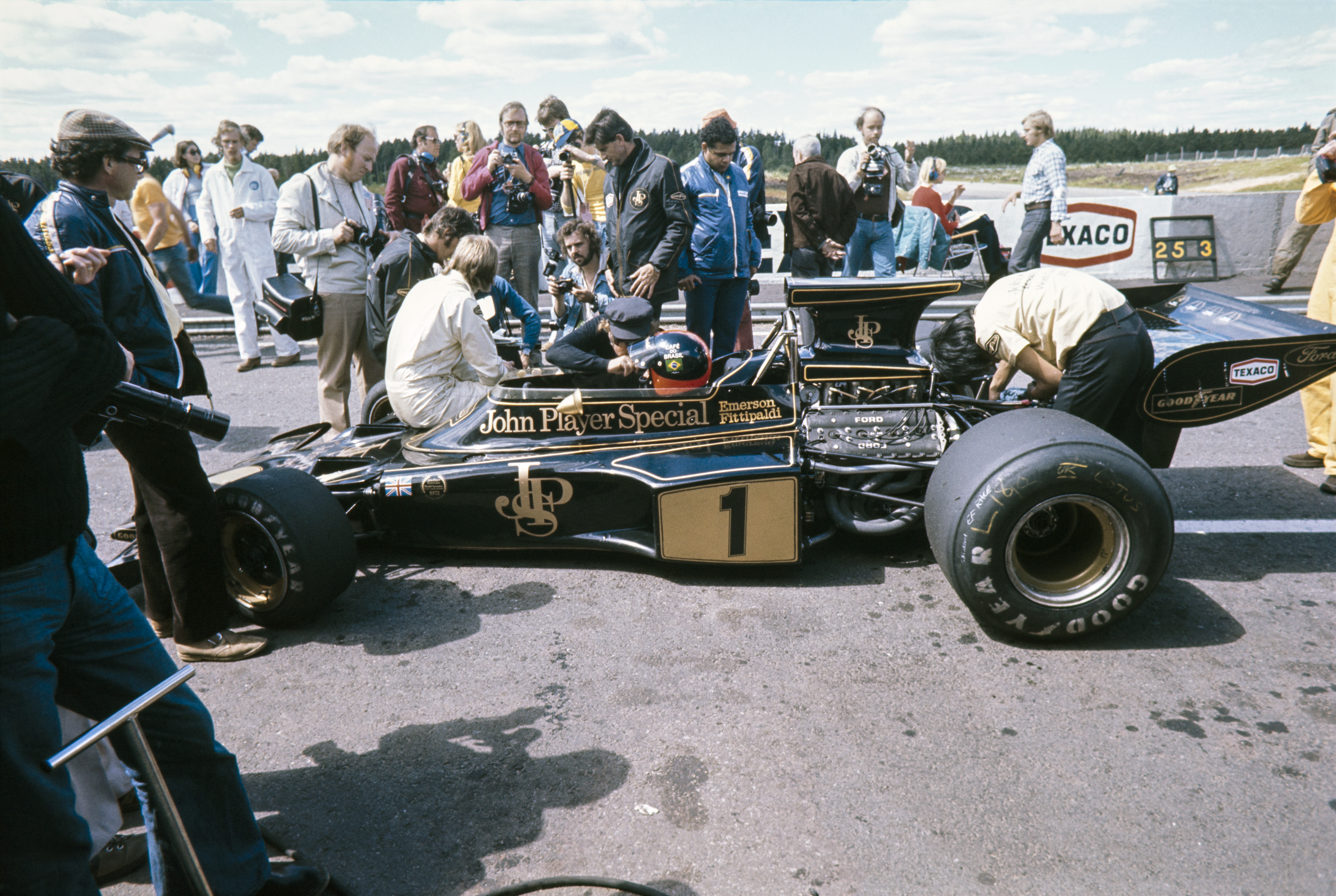
Emerson Fittipaldi in the pits ahead of the Swedish Grand Prix

The F1 circus arrived at Anderstorp Raceway for the first Swedish Grand Prix and it was local hero Ronnie Peterson who qualified on pole position, ahead of François Cevert. Stewart and Fittipaldi started on the second row. At the start, Fittipaldi got up to second and so, the two Lotuses were leading the two Tyrrells. On lap 33, Stewart passed his teammate, who fell further back behind Denny Hulme in miscommunication with a lapped car. The McLaren driver was on a real charge and rejoiced in his rivals' troubles: Fittipaldi's brakes were fading before his gearbox packed up all together, Stewart lost drive and Peterson had worn out his tyres. Hulme won his first Grand Prix, ahead of Peterson and Cevert. Stewart was a lucky man finishing in fifth and salvaging two points for the championship.

Circuit Paul Ricard played host to the French Grand Prix, combining two twisty sections with the 1.8 km (1.1 mi) long Mistral Straight. Stewart qualified on pole, ahead of a surprising Jody Scheckter in just his third F1 race, and championship leader Fittipaldi. Scheckter made the quickest getaway and was followed by fifth-starting Peterson. Astonishingly, Scheckter led the field for 42 laps. While lapping a backmarker, however, the South African was hit from behind by now-second placed Fittipaldi. Both cars broke their left front suspension. Peterson picked up the scraps to take his first Grand Prix victory, ahead of Cevert and Reuteman. Stewart came home in fourth, scoring less points than usual, but important points nonetheless.

In the Drivers' Championship, Jackie Stewart (42 points) had just overtaken Emerson Fittipaldi (41), while François Cevert was third (31). The Manufacturers' Cup was being fought just as closely by Lotus (52 points) and Tyrrell (51), ahead of McLaren (26) in a distant third.

=== Rounds 9 to 11 ===
Going into the second half of the championship, the British Grand Prix was held at the fast Silverstone Circuit. The 450 bhp (340 kW) cars were expected to hit average speeds of nearly 225 km/h (140 mph). Fans and rivals were eager to see the pace of Jody Scheckter, after he was robbed of an apparent victory in France. The South African could manage a sixth starting place. Pole position was for Ronnie Peterson (Lotus), with Denny Hulme and Peter Revson (both McLarens) next to him. Championship rivals Jackie Stewart and Emerson Fittipaldi filled the second row of the grid. At the start, Stewart shot up to take the lead, ahead of Peterson and eighth-starting Reutemann. Going through Woodcote corner for the first time, Scheckter lost the back end of his McLaren, hit the pit wall and came to a halt in the middle of the track. Revson hit Scheckter's rear wing and another nine cars came together in a pile-up. The race was suspended (only the second time in history that had happened) while marshals extricated Andrea de Adamich from the wreckage with a broken ankle. Ninety minutes after the first start, the race got underway again and Peterson led from Lauda and Stewart. The Scot quickly got up to second and then tried his luck for first, but spun on the kerb. When Lauda made a pit stop, Fittipaldi was second, until he was hit with a transmission failure. During a short rain shower, Peterson lost the lead to Revson and the American managed to win his first Grand Prix. Hulme was third, ahead of future champion James Hunt in fourth.

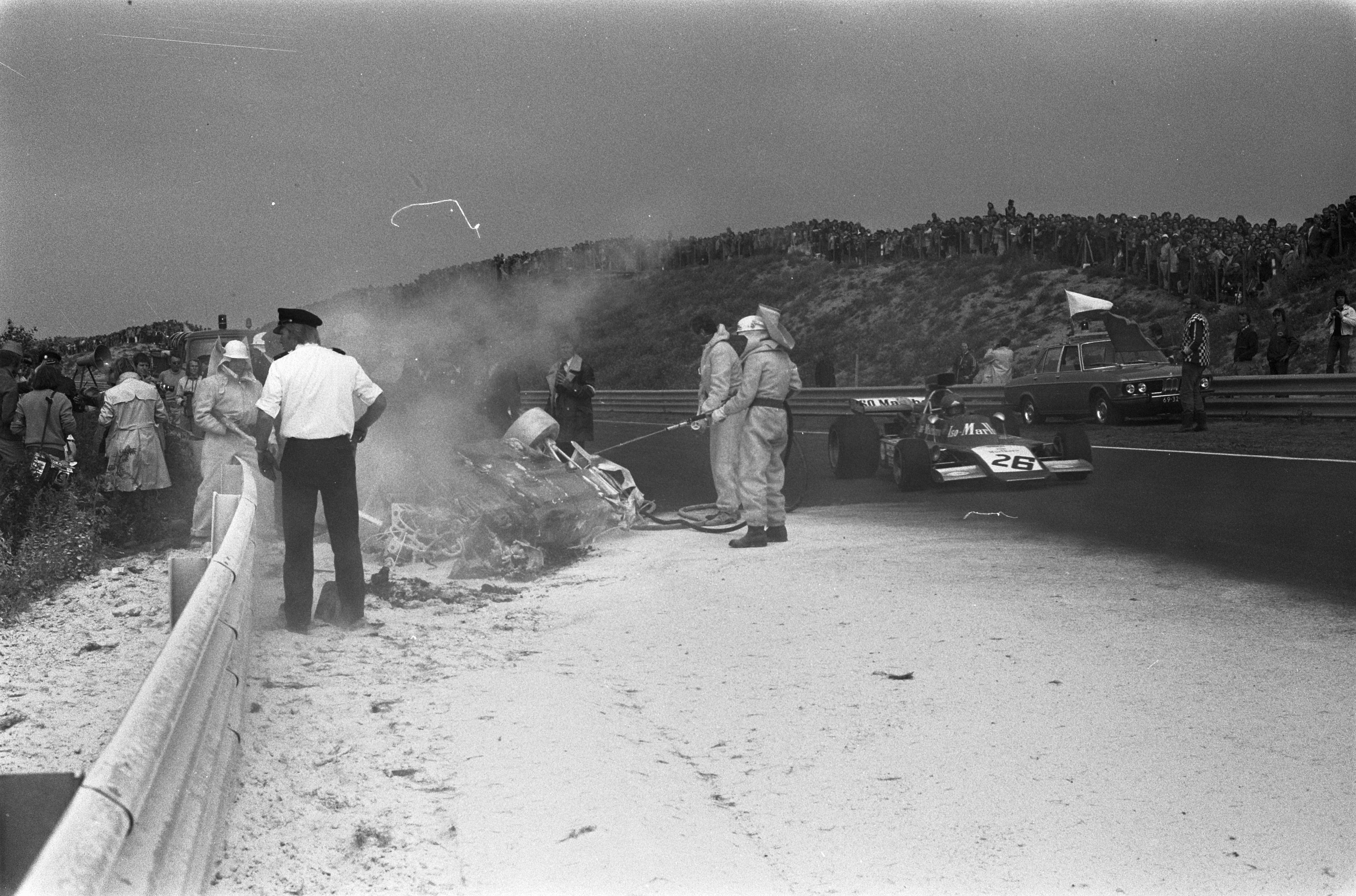
Roger Williamson burned to death while the Dutch Grand Prix continued.

Scuderia Ferrari had decided to withdraw from the Dutch Grand Prix to focus on upgrading their cars, seeing that they had played no part in the championship so far this year. Fittipaldi crashed during Saturday practice when his left front wheel broke coming on to the start-finish straight. His ankles were badly bruised. His teammate Peterson qualified on pole for the sixth time this season, ahead of Stewart and Cevert (Tyrrell). The top two remained the same at the start, but eighth-starting Carlos Pace took the place of Cevert in third. Fittipaldi had started the race but pitted on the second lap and was helped out of his car. On lap 8, Roger Williamson crashed his March at the same corner as Piers Courage in 1970. He was trapped in his overturned and burning car. With the crash taking place at the far end of the track, no one of the marshals understood this, instead mistaking David Purley, having abandoned his race to rescue Williamson, for the driver that had crashed, and they tried to drag him away. The race, meanwhile, continued and Peterson's lead grew ever bigger, until on lap 40, his engine was losing speed. He eventually retired on lap 66. Stewart took his fourth victory of the season ahead of Cevert and Hunt, the future champion's claiming his first podium finish. Local driver Gijs van Lennep finished sixth and scored a point as well.

The fearsome Nürburgring Nordschleife constituted the arena for the German Grand Prix. Stewart started on pole, ahead of Peterson and Cevert. Fittipaldi was down in fourteenth, still recovering from his injuries. Peterson retired halfway through the first lap and the Tyrrells were unchallenged. Jacky Ickx was third for McLaren. Future champion Niki Lauda had crashed on the second lap, completely demolishing his BRM and breaking his wrist.

In the Drivers' Championship, Emerson Fittipaldi (42 points) had fallen down to third after a streak of four races without points. Jackie Stewart (60) was leading teammate François Cevert (45). Tyrrell (71 points) had also taken a firm grip on the Manufacturers' Cup over Lotus (59) and McLaren (42).

=== Rounds 12 to 15 ===
Lotus were not giving up their hunt for the title: Emerson Fittipaldi and Ronnie Peterson qualified 1-2 for the Austrian Grand Prix. Their rivals at Tyrrell, Jackie Stewart and François Cevert, started seventh and tenth, respectively. Denny Hulme (McLaren) started third but overtook Fittipaldi before the first corner. On lap 4, Stewart overtook Arturo Merzario for fourth place. Cevert tried the same on lap 6, but hit the Ferrari and had to retire with a damaged wishbone. Hulme had to pit when he lost a cylinder. Fittipaldi was allowed to pass Peterson to keep his championship fight alive, but on lap 48, his engine suddenly died. His fuel line had come loose and it meant another retirement for the 1972 champion. Peterson won, ahead of Stewart and Pace.

If Stewart would manage to finish third or higher in the Italian Grand Prix, he would clinch the Drivers' Championship. A lower points finish would almost necessitate Fittipaldi to win and Cevert to get on the podium to stay in the championship fight. It was Peterson who claimed his seventh pole position of the season, ahead of the McLarens of Peter Revson and Denny Hulme. Stewart started in sixth, with his teammate and closest rival Cevert in eleventh. Fittipaldi started in fourth but was second before the first corner. Stewart got up to that vital fourth position, until he had to pit with a flat rear tyre. He rejoined in nineteenth, but by half distance, he was up in eighth place. With seven laps to go, he overtook his teammate for fourth position, so Fittipaldi would have to win the race. However, Peterson stayed ahead and Fittipaldi finished second ahead of Revson. Stewart was awarded the 1973 Drivers' Championship.

For the Canadian Grand Prix, Peterson started on pole, ahead of Revson and Scheckter. A heavy shower fell before the start and all-but-one drivers started on full wet tyres. After the start, Peterson was leading Scheckter and Lauda, while Revson fell back to seventh. Lauda was comfortable in the wet conditions and actually grabbed the lead on lap 4. Peterson crashed out on lap 16, before the track dried up and everyone started coming into the pits. The race organisers got confused with the order of the cars, even more when Scheckter and Cevert crashed and, as was agreed after the Dutch Grand Prix, the pace car was deployed. No one, however, knew for sure who was in the lead and the pace car driver picked up Howden Ganley as such. After ten laps, during which the track had completely dried, the field was released and Ganley hold off Stewart and Fittipaldi for eight laps. Post-race analysis showed that, actually, Jackie Oliver lost the lead on that lap to Peter Revson. Lotus team boss Colin Chapman believed Fittipaldi won after passing Ganley, but three hours after the race finished, Revson was declared the winner, with Fittipaldi in second and Oliver in third.

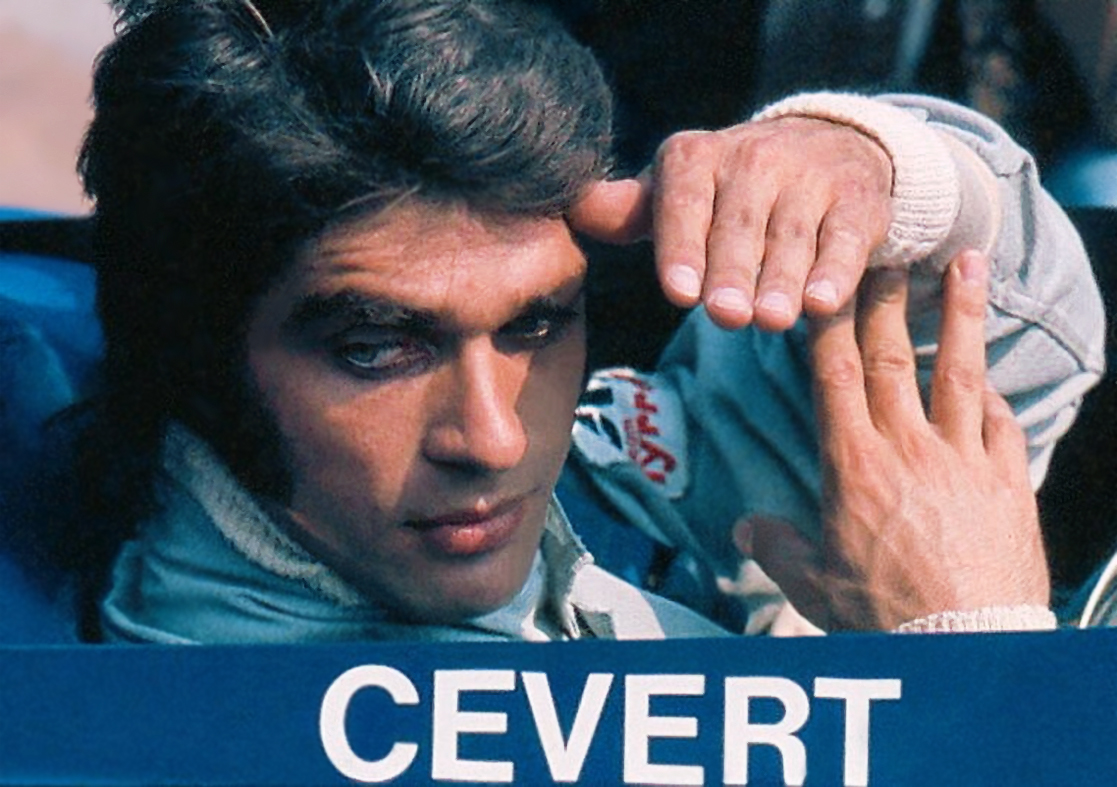
François Cevert fatally crashed during practice for the United States Grand Prix.

The 1973 season ended on a low-point when François Cevert crashed during practice for the United States Grand Prix and was killed on impact. Tyrrell withdrew from the event, giving up the Manufacturers' Title to Lotus. Peterson started on pole for the ninth time this year, ahead of Reutemann and Fittipaldi. Future champion Hunt in his little March passed Fittipaldi and Reutemann and came within a second of Peterson. The Swede held on to take his third win in four races, ahead of hero-of-the-day Hunt and Reutemann.

The Drivers' Championship was awarded to Jackie Stewart (Tyrrell, 71 points), ahead of Emerson Fittipaldi (Lotus, 55) and Ronnie Peterson (Lotus, 52). The Manufacturers' Cup was won by Lotus (92 points), ahead of Tyrrell (82) and McLaren (58).

== Results and standings ==
=== Grands Prix ===
The following races counted towards both the 1973 World Championship of Drivers and the 1973 International Cup for F1 Manufacturers.

Round	Grand Prix	Pole position	Fastest lap	Winning driver	Winning constructor	Tyre	Report
1	(Argentina) Argentine Grand Prix	(Switzerland) Clay Regazzoni	(Brazil) Emerson Fittipaldi	(Brazil) Emerson Fittipaldi	(United Kingdom) Lotus-Ford	G	Report
2	(Brazil) Brazilian Grand Prix	(Sweden) Ronnie Peterson	(Brazil) Emerson Fittipaldi (New Zealand) Denny Hulme	(Brazil) Emerson Fittipaldi	(United Kingdom) Lotus-Ford	G	Report
3	(South Africa) South African Grand Prix	(New Zealand) Denny Hulme	(Brazil) Emerson Fittipaldi	(United Kingdom) Jackie Stewart	(United Kingdom) Tyrrell-Ford	G	Report
4	(Spain) Spanish Grand Prix	(Sweden) Ronnie Peterson	(Sweden) Ronnie Peterson	(Brazil) Emerson Fittipaldi	(United Kingdom) Lotus-Ford	G	Report
5	(Belgium) Belgian Grand Prix	(Sweden) Ronnie Peterson	(France) François Cevert	(United Kingdom) Jackie Stewart	(United Kingdom) Tyrrell-Ford	G	Report
6	Monaco Grand Prix	(United Kingdom) Jackie Stewart	(Brazil) Emerson Fittipaldi	(United Kingdom) Jackie Stewart	(United Kingdom) Tyrrell-Ford	G	Report
7	(Sweden) Swedish Grand Prix	(Sweden) Ronnie Peterson	(New Zealand) Denny Hulme	(New Zealand) Denny Hulme	(United Kingdom) McLaren-Ford	G	Report
8	(France) French Grand Prix	(United Kingdom) Jackie Stewart	(New Zealand) Denny Hulme	(Sweden) Ronnie Peterson	(United Kingdom) Lotus-Ford	G	Report
9	(United Kingdom) British Grand Prix	(Sweden) Ronnie Peterson	(United Kingdom) James Hunt	(United States) Peter Revson	(United Kingdom) McLaren-Ford	G	Report
10	(Netherlands) Dutch Grand Prix	(Sweden) Ronnie Peterson	(Sweden) Ronnie Peterson	(United Kingdom) Jackie Stewart	(United Kingdom) Tyrrell-Ford	G	Report
11	(West Germany) German Grand Prix	(United Kingdom) Jackie Stewart	(Brazil) Carlos Pace	(United Kingdom) Jackie Stewart	(United Kingdom) Tyrrell-Ford	G	Report
12	(Austria) Austrian Grand Prix	(Brazil) Emerson Fittipaldi	(Brazil) Carlos Pace	(Sweden) Ronnie Peterson	(United Kingdom) Lotus-Ford	G	Report
13	(Italy) Italian Grand Prix	(Sweden) Ronnie Peterson	(United Kingdom) Jackie Stewart	(Sweden) Ronnie Peterson	(United Kingdom) Lotus-Ford	G	Report
14	(Canada) Canadian Grand Prix	(Sweden) Ronnie Peterson	(Brazil) Emerson Fittipaldi	(United States) Peter Revson	(United Kingdom) McLaren-Ford	G	Report
15	United States Grand Prix	(Sweden) Ronnie Peterson	(United Kingdom) James Hunt	(Sweden) Ronnie Peterson	(United Kingdom) Lotus-Ford	G	Report

=== Scoring system ===
Points were awarded to the top six classified finishers. The International Cup for F1 Manufacturers only counted the points of the highest-finishing driver for each race. For both the Championship and the Cup, the best seven results from rounds 1-8 and the best six results from rounds 9-15 were counted.

Numbers without parentheses are championship points; numbers in parentheses are total points scored. Points were awarded in the following system:

Position	1st	2nd	3rd	4th	5th	6th
Race	9	6	4	3	2	1

=== World Drivers' Championship standings ===
Pos.	Driver	ARG (Argentina)	BRA (Brazil)	RSA (South Africa)	ESP (Spain)	BEL (Belgium)	MON (Monaco)	SWE (Sweden)	FRA (France)	GBR (United Kingdom)	NED (Netherlands)	GER (West Germany)	AUT (Austria)	ITA (Italy)	CAN (Canada)	USA (United States)	Points
1	(United Kingdom) Jackie Stewart	3	2	1	Ret	1	1^{P}	5	4^{P}	10	1	1^{P}	2	4^{F}	5	DNS	71
2	(Brazil) Emerson Fittipaldi	1^{F}	1^{F}	3^{F}	1	3	2^{F}	12	Ret	Ret	Ret	6	Ret^{P}	2	2^{F}	6	55
3	(Sweden) Ronnie Peterson	Ret	Ret^{P}	11	Ret^{P}^{F}	Ret^{P}	3	2^{P}	1	2^{P}	11^{P}^{F}	Ret	1	1^{P}	Ret^{P}	1^{P}	52
4	(France) François Cevert	2	10	NC	2	2^{F}	4	3	2	5	2	2	Ret	5	Ret	DNS†	47
5	(United States) Peter Revson	8	Ret	2	4	Ret	5	7		1	4	9	Ret	3	1	5	38
6	(New Zealand) Denny Hulme	5	3^{F}	5^{P}	6	7	6	1^{F}	8^{F}	3	Ret	12	8	15	13	4	26
7	(Argentina) Carlos Reutemann	Ret	11	7	Ret	Ret	Ret	4	3	6	Ret	Ret	4	6	8	3	16
8	(United Kingdom) James Hunt						9		6	4^{F}	3		Ret	DNS	7	2^{F}	14
9	(Belgium) Jacky Ickx	4	5	Ret	12	Ret	Ret	6	5	8		3		8		7	12
10	(France) Jean-Pierre Beltoise	Ret	Ret	Ret	5	Ret	Ret	Ret	11	Ret	5	Ret	5	13	4	9	9
11	(Brazil) Carlos Pace	Ret	Ret	Ret	Ret	8	Ret	10	13	Ret	7	4^{F}	3^{F}	Ret	18	Ret	7
12	(Italy) Arturo Merzario	9	4	4			Ret		7				7	Ret	15	16	6
13	(United States) George Follmer			6	3	Ret	DNS	14	Ret	Ret	10	Ret	Ret	10	17	14	5
14	(United Kingdom) Jackie Oliver			Ret	Ret	Ret	10	Ret	Ret	Ret	Ret	8	Ret	11	3	15	4
15	(Italy) Andrea de Adamich			8	Ret	4	7		Ret	Ret							3
=	(Brazil) Wilson Fittipaldi	6	Ret	Ret	10	Ret	11	Ret	16	Ret	Ret	5	Ret	Ret	11	NC	3
17	(Austria) Niki Lauda	Ret	8	Ret	Ret	5	Ret	13	9	12	Ret	Ret	DNS	Ret	Ret	Ret	2
=	(Switzerland) Clay Regazzoni	7^{P}	6	Ret	9	10	Ret	9	12	7	8	Ret	6	Ret		8	2
19	(New Zealand) Chris Amon					6	Ret			Ret	Ret		DNS		10	DNS	1
=	(Netherlands) Gijs van Lennep										6		9	Ret			1
=	(New Zealand) Howden Ganley	NC	7	10	Ret	Ret	Ret	11	14	9	9	DNS	NC	NC	6	12	1
—	(United Kingdom) Mike Hailwood	Ret	Ret	Ret	Ret	Ret	8	Ret	Ret	Ret	Ret	14	10	7	9	Ret	0
—	(United Kingdom) Mike Beuttler	10	Ret	NC	7	11	Ret	8		11	Ret	16	Ret	Ret	Ret	10	0
—	(West Germany) Jochen Mass									Ret		7				Ret	0
—	(France) Henri Pescarolo				8				Ret			10					0
—	(United Kingdom) Graham Hill				Ret	9	Ret	Ret	10	Ret	NC	13	Ret	14	16	13	0
—	(Italy) Nanni Galli	Ret	9		11	Ret	Ret										0
—	(United Kingdom) David Purley						Ret			DNS	Ret	15		9			0
—	(South Africa) Jody Scheckter			9					Ret	Ret					Ret	Ret	0
—	(West Germany) Rolf Stommelen											11	Ret	12	12		0
—	(France) Jean-Pierre Jarier	Ret	Ret	NC		Ret	Ret	Ret	Ret				Ret		NC	11	0
—	(Brazil) Luiz Bueno		12														0
—	(Liechtenstein) Rikky von Opel								15	13	DNS		Ret	Ret	NC	Ret	0
—	(Australia) Tim Schenken														14		0
—	(South Africa) Eddie Keizan			NC													0
—	(United Kingdom) Roger Williamson									Ret	Ret†						0
—	(United Kingdom) John Watson									Ret						Ret	0
—	(Sweden) Reine Wisell							DNS	Ret								0
—	(South Africa) Dave Charlton			Ret													0
—	(South Africa) Jackie Pretorius			Ret													0
—	(New Zealand) Graham McRae									Ret							0
—	(United Kingdom) Peter Gethin														Ret		0
—	(United Kingdom) Brian Redman															DSQ	0
—	(Denmark) Tom Belsø							DNS									0
Pos	Driver	ARG (Argentina)	BRA (Brazil)	RSA (South Africa)	ESP (Spain)	BEL (Belgium)	MON (Monaco)	SWE (Sweden)	FRA (France)	GBR (United Kingdom)	NED (Netherlands)	GER (West Germany)	AUT (Austria)	ITA (Italy)	CAN (Canada)	USA (United States)	Points

Key
Colour	Result
Gold	Winner
Silver	Second place
Bronze	Third place
Green	Other points position
Blue	Other classified position
Blue	Not classified, finished (NC)
Purple	Not classified, retired (Ret)
Red	Did not qualify (DNQ)
Black	Disqualified (DSQ)
White	Did not start (DNS)
White	Race cancelled (C)
Blank	Did not practice (DNP)
Blank	Excluded (EX)
Blank	Did not arrive (DNA)
Blank	Withdrawn (WD)
Blank	Did not enter (empty cell)
Annotation	Meaning
P	Pole position
F	Fastest lap

- † Williamson suffered a fatal accident during the Dutch Grand Prix.
- † Cevert suffered a fatal accident in qualifying for the United States Grand Prix.

=== International Cup for F1 Manufacturers standings ===
Pos.	Manufacturer	ARG (Argentina)	BRA (Brazil)	RSA (South Africa)	ESP (Spain)	BEL (Belgium)	MON (Monaco)	SWE (Sweden)	FRA (France)	GBR (United Kingdom)	NED (Netherlands)	GER (West Germany)	AUT (Austria)	ITA (Italy)	CAN (Canada)	USA (United States)	Pts.
1	(United Kingdom) Lotus-Ford	1	1	3	1	(3)	2	2	1	2	11	6	1	1	2	1	92 (96)
2	(United Kingdom) Tyrrell-Ford	2	2	1	2	1	1	(3)	2	5	1	1	2	4	5	DNS	82 (86)
3	(United Kingdom) McLaren-Ford	5	3	2	4	7	5	1	8	1	4	3	8	3	1	4	58
4	(United Kingdom) Brabham-Ford	6	11	7	10	4	7	4	3	6	Ret	5	4	6	8	3	22
5	(United Kingdom) March-Ford	10	Ret	NC	7	11	9	8	6	4	3	15	Ret	9	7	2	14
6	(Italy) Ferrari	4	4	4	12	Ret	Ret	6	5	8	WD	WD	7	8	15	16	12
7	(United Kingdom) BRM	7	6	Ret	5	5	Ret	9	9	7	5	Ret	5	13	4	8	12
8	(United States) Shadow-Ford		WD	6	3	9	10	14	10	Ret	10	8	Ret	10	3	13	9
9	(United Kingdom) Surtees-Ford	Ret	12	8	Ret	8	8	10	13	Ret	7	4	3	7	9	Ret	7
10	(United Kingdom) Iso-Marlboro-Ford	NC	7	10	11	Ret	Ret	11	14	9	6	10	9	NC	6	7	2
11	(Italy) Tecno					6	Ret	WD	WD	Ret	Ret	WD	DNS	WD			1
—	(United Kingdom) Ensign-Ford				WD	WD		WD	15	13	DNS	WD	Ret	Ret	NC	Ret	0
Pos.	Manufacturer	ARG (Argentina)	BRA (Brazil)	RSA (South Africa)	ESP (Spain)	BEL (Belgium)	MON (Monaco)	SWE (Sweden)	FRA (France)	GBR (United Kingdom)	NED (Netherlands)	GER (West Germany)	AUT (Austria)	ITA (Italy)	CAN (Canada)	USA (United States)	Pts.

Ensign, which did not score points during the championship, was not given a classification in the official FIA results.

=== Non-championship races ===
The 1973 Formula One season included two non-championship races which were open to both Formula One and Formula 5000 cars.

Race Name	Circuit	Date	Winning driver	Constructor	Report
(United Kingdom) VIII Race of Champions	Brands Hatch	18 March	(United Kingdom) Peter Gethin	(United Kingdom) Chevron-Chevrolet	Report
(United Kingdom) XXV BRDC International Trophy	Silverstone	8 April	(United Kingdom) Jackie Stewart	(United Kingdom) Tyrrell-Ford	Report
