= 1973 Italian Grand Prix =

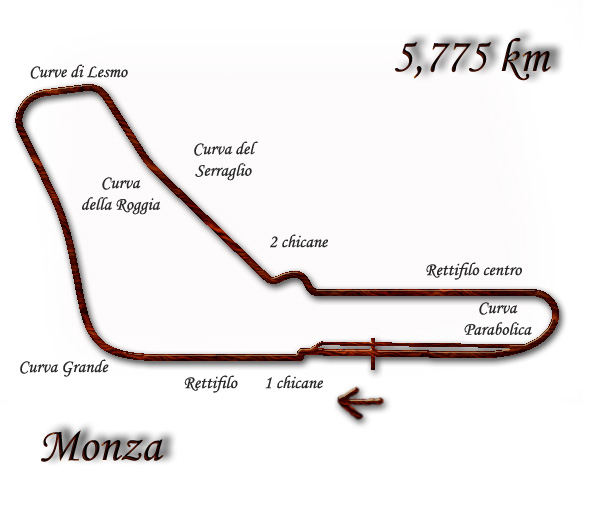

Race details
- Date: 9 September 1973
- Official name: 44º Gran Premio d'Italia
- Location: Autodromo Nazionale di Monza; Monza, Lombardy, Italy
- Course: Permanent racing facility
- Course length: 5.775 km (3.588 miles)
- Distance: 55 laps, 317.625 km (197.363 miles)

Pole position
Driver	(Sweden) Ronnie Peterson	Lotus-Ford
- Time: 1:34.8

Fastest lap
Driver	(United Kingdom) Jackie Stewart	Tyrrell-Ford
- Time: 1:35.3

Podium
First	(Sweden) Ronnie Peterson	Lotus-Ford
Second	(Brazil) Emerson Fittipaldi	Lotus-Ford
Third	(United States) Peter Revson	McLaren-Ford

The 1973 Italian Grand Prix was a Formula One motor race held at Monza on 9 September 1973. It was race 13 of 15 in both the 1973 World Championship of Drivers and the 1973 International Cup for Formula One Manufacturers.

The 55-lap race was won from pole position by Ronnie Peterson, driving a Lotus-Ford, with teammate Emerson Fittipaldi second and Peter Revson third in a McLaren-Ford. Jackie Stewart suffered a puncture early in the race which dropped him to 20th, but charged through the field to finish fourth, which was enough to secure his third (and final) Drivers' Championship. Three days after race, Stewart announced his retirement from the sport at the end of season.

Stewart's Tyrrell teammate François Cevert finished fifth, scoring what would turn out to be the final points of his Formula One career. Carlos Reutemann completed the top six in his Brabham.

The race also saw Jacky Ickx's last drive for Ferrari, the Belgian returning to the team for its home race having left after the British Grand Prix. Ickx qualified 14th and finished eighth, a lap down on Peterson.

== Qualifying classification ==
Pos	No	Driver	Constructor	Time/Gap
1	2	(Sweden) Ronnie Peterson	Lotus–Ford	1:34.80
2	8	(United States) Peter Revson	McLaren–Ford	+0.49
3	7	(New Zealand) Denny Hulme	McLaren–Ford	+0.65
4	1	(Brazil) Emerson Fittipaldi	Lotus–Ford	+0.88
5	24	(Brazil) Carlos Pace	Surtees–Ford	+1.26
6	5	(United Kingdom) Jackie Stewart	Tyrrell–Ford	+1.30
7	4	(Italy) Arturo Merzario	Ferrari	+1.57
8	23	(United Kingdom) Mike Hailwood	Surtees–Ford	+1.64
9	9	(West Germany) Rolf Stommelen	Brabham–Ford	+1.74
10	10	(Argentina) Carlos Reutemann	Brabham–Ford	+1.75
11	6	(France) François Cevert	Tyrrell–Ford	+1.78
12	15	(United Kingdom) Mike Beuttler	March–Ford	+1.87
13	20	(France) Jean-Pierre Beltoise	BRM	+2.08
14	3	(Belgium) Jacky Ickx	Ferrari	+2.19
15	21	(Austria) Niki Lauda	BRM	+2.46
16	11	(Brazil) Wilson Fittipaldi	Brabham–Ford	+2.50
17	28	(Liechtenstein) Frederick von Opel	Ensign–Ford	+2.60
18	19	(Switzerland) Clay Regazzoni	BRM	+2.78
19	17	(United Kingdom) Jackie Oliver	Shadow–Ford	+3.01
20	25	(New Zealand) Howden Ganley	Williams–Ford	+3.33
21	16	(United States) George Follmer	Shadow–Ford	+3.86
22	12	(United Kingdom) Graham Hill	Shadow–Ford	+4.08
23	26	(Netherlands) Gijs van Lennep	Williams–Ford	+4.44
24	29	(United Kingdom) David Purley	March–Ford	+4.48
25	27	(United Kingdom) James Hunt	March–Ford	+5.02

== Race classification ==
Pos	No	Driver	Constructor	Laps	Time/Retired	Grid	Points
1	2	(Sweden) Ronnie Peterson	Lotus-Ford	55	1:29:17.0	1	9
2	1	(Brazil) Emerson Fittipaldi	Lotus-Ford	55	+ 0.8	4	6
3	8	(United States) Peter Revson	McLaren-Ford	55	+ 28.8	2	4
4	5	(United Kingdom) Jackie Stewart	Tyrrell-Ford	55	+ 33.2	6	3
5	6	(France) François Cevert	Tyrrell-Ford	55	+ 46.2	11	2
6	10	(Argentina) Carlos Reutemann	Brabham-Ford	55	+ 59.8	10	1
7	23	(United Kingdom) Mike Hailwood	Surtees-Ford	55	+ 1:28.7	8	
8	3	(Belgium) Jacky Ickx	Ferrari	54	+ 1 Lap	14	
9	29	(United Kingdom) David Purley	March-Ford	54	+ 1 Lap	24	
10	16	(United States) George Follmer	Shadow-Ford	54	+ 1 Lap	21	
11	17	(United Kingdom) Jackie Oliver	Shadow-Ford	54	+ 1 Lap	19	
12	9	(Germany) Rolf Stommelen	Brabham-Ford	54	+ 1 Lap	9	
13	20	(France) Jean-Pierre Beltoise	BRM	54	+ 1 Lap	13	
14	12	(United Kingdom) Graham Hill	Shadow-Ford	54	+ 1 Lap	22	
15	7	(New Zealand) Denny Hulme	McLaren-Ford	53	+ 2 Laps	3	
NC	25	(New Zealand) Howden Ganley	Iso-Marlboro-Ford	44	+ 11 Laps	20	
Ret	15	(United Kingdom) Mike Beuttler	March-Ford	34	Gearbox	12	
Ret	21	(Austria) Niki Lauda	BRM	33	Accident	15	
Ret	19	(Switzerland) Clay Regazzoni	BRM	30	Ignition	18	
Ret	24	(Brazil) Carlos Pace	Surtees-Ford	17	Tyre	5	
Ret	26	(Netherlands) Gijs van Lennep	Iso-Marlboro-Ford	14	Overheating	23	
Ret	28	(Liechtenstein) Rikky von Opel	Ensign-Ford	10	Overheating	17	
Ret	11	(Brazil) Wilson Fittipaldi	Brabham-Ford	6	Brakes	16	
Ret	4	(Italy) Arturo Merzario	Ferrari	2	Suspension	7	
DNS	27	(United Kingdom) James Hunt	March-Ford		Practice Accident		

== Notes ==
- This was the 10th fastest lap set by Tyrrell.

== Championship standings after the race ==
Drivers' Championship standings

	Pos	Driver	Points
	1	(United Kingdom) **Jackie Stewart**	69
1	2	(Brazil) Emerson Fittipaldi	48
1	3	(France) François Cevert	47
	4	(Sweden) Ronnie Peterson	43
	5	(United States) Peter Revson	27

Constructors' Championship standings

Pos	Constructor	Points
1	(United Kingdom) **Tyrrell-Ford***	80 (84)
2	(United Kingdom) **Lotus-Ford***	77 (81)
3	(United Kingdom) McLaren-Ford	46
4	(United Kingdom) Brabham-Ford	18
5	(Italy) Ferrari	12

- Note: Only the top five positions are included for both sets of standings. Only the best 7 results from the first 8 races and the best 6 results from the last 7 races counted towards the Championship. Numbers without parentheses are Championship points; numbers in parentheses are total points scored.
- **Bold text** indicates the 1973 World Drivers' Champion.
- Competitors in bold and marked with an asterisk still had a theoretical chance of becoming World Champion.

Previous race: 1973 Austrian Grand Prix	FIA Formula One World Championship; 1973 season	Next race: 1973 Canadian Grand Prix
Previous race: 1972 Italian Grand Prix	Italian Grand Prix	Next race: 1974 Italian Grand Prix
