= Clay Regazzoni =

Swiss racing driver (1939–2006)

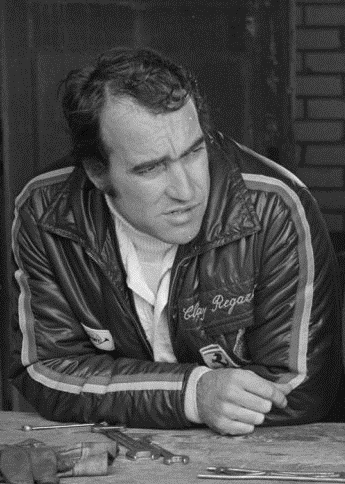
- Regazzoni at the 1971 Dutch Grand Prix
- Born: Gianclaudio Giuseppe Regazzoni; 5 September 1939; Mendrisio, Ticino, Switzerland
- Died: 15 December 2006 (aged 67); Fontevivo, Emilia-Romagna, Italy
- Spouse: Maria Pia (m. 1967)
- Children: 2

Formula One World Championship career
- Nationality: (Switzerland) Swiss
- Active years: 1970–1980
- Team(s): Ferrari, BRM, Ensign, Shadow, Williams
- Entries: 139 (132 starts)
- Championships: 0
- Wins: 5
- Podiums: 28
- Career points: 209 (212) (Note: Up until 1990, not all points scored by a driver contributed to their final World Championship tally (see list of points scoring systems for more information). Numbers without parentheses are Championship points; numbers in parentheses are total points scored.)
- Pole positions: 5
- Fastest laps: 15
- First entry: 1970 Dutch Grand Prix
- First win: 1970 Italian Grand Prix
- Last win: 1979 British Grand Prix
- Last entry: 1980 United States Grand Prix West

24 Hours of Le Mans career
- Years: 1970
- Teams: Ferrari
- Best finish: DNF (1970)
- Class wins: 0

Gianclaudio Giuseppe "Clay" Regazzoni (Italian pronunciation: [dʒaŋˈklaudjo dʒuˈzɛppe reɡatˈtsoːni]; 5 September 1939 – 15 December 2006) was a Swiss racing driver and broadcaster, who competed in Formula One from 1970 to 1980. Regazzoni was runner-up in the Formula One World Drivers' Championship in 1974 with Ferrari, and won five Grands Prix across 11 seasons.

His first win was the Italian Grand Prix at Monza in his debut season, driving for Ferrari. He remained with the Italian team until 1972. After a single season with BRM, Regazzoni returned to Ferrari for a further three years from 1974 (where he was the runner-up to Emerson Fittipaldi) to 1976. After finally leaving Ferrari at the end of 1976, Regazzoni joined the Ensign and Shadow teams, before moving to Williams in 1979, where he took the British team's first ever Grand Prix victory, the 1979 British Grand Prix at Silverstone.

Regazzoni was replaced by Carlos Reutemann at Williams for 1980 and moved back to Ensign. Following an accident at the 1980 United States Grand Prix West, he was left paralyzed from the waist down, ending his career in Formula One. Regazzoni did not stop racing, and he competed in the Paris–Dakar rally and Sebring 12 Hours using a hand-controlled car during the late 1980s and early 1990s. In 1996, Regazzoni became a commentator for Italian TV. He was known as a hard-charging racer. Jody Scheckter stated that if "he'd been a cowboy he'd have been the one in the black hat". Regazzoni died in a car accident in Italy on 15 December 2006.

== Personal and early life ==
Gianclaudio Regazzoni was born in Mendrisio, Switzerland, on 5 September 1939, a few days after the start of the Second World War. Regazzoni grew up in Porza, in the Canton of Ticino, part of the Italian speaking region of Switzerland. He was married to Maria Pia, with whom he had two children: Alessia and Gian Maria.

== Racing career ==
=== Pre-Formula One ===
==== Early racing and Formula Three ====
Regazzoni first started competing in car races in 1963, at the comparatively late age of 24. Many of his early motorsport experiences were across the border in Italy due to Switzerland having banned motor racing following the accident at the 1955 24 Hours of Le Mans race. His first outings were in his own Austin-Healey Sprite, with which he took two podium finishes from only his first three races. This instant success encouraged Regazzoni to move up to a Mini Cooper for the 1964 club racing season.

1965 saw Regazzoni behind the wheel of an open-wheeled car for the first time, as he entered the European Formula Three championship with a Brabham. This first season brought moderate success, and improving form during 1966 (this time driving a De Tomaso) brought him to the attention of ambitious Italian constructor Tecno. Tecno offered Regazzoni the use of one of their F3 chassis for 1967, where his reliable, fast performances earned him the offer of a works Tecno drive in Formula Two for the following year. Despite this, Regazzoni continued to drive in Formula Three events during 1968 and, not for the last time, was lucky to survive a major accident. Exiting the chicane during the Monaco Grand Prix Formula 3 support race, Regazzoni lost control of his car and collided heavily with the crash barrier. The diminutive size of the Formula 3 machine allowed it to pass under the rail, the sharp metal edge of the Armco slicing across the top of the open cockpit. Regazzoni managed to duck down low enough in the driving seat for the rail to pass above him, missing his head by a tiny margin. The car eventually came to a halt when the roll hoop, behind Regazzoni's head and significantly lower than the top of his helmet, wedged itself underneath the barrier.

==== Formula Two ====
In Formula Two, Regazzoni had found the ideal partner in Tecno. His hard-charging style perfectly matched the forward-thinking Tecno ambitions, and Regazzoni quickly developed a reputation as a tough competitor. Regazzoni was implicated in the death of young British driver Chris Lambert at the 1968 Formula Two Dutch Grand Prix. Some observers accused Regazzoni, who was running well up the field, of deliberately running Lambert's Brabham off the track while lapping him. Lambert lost control and crashed into a bridge. Even though Regazzoni had been fully exonerated at the subsequent inquest, rumours persisted for many years afterwards. Lambert's father pursued a private action against Regazzoni, which dragged on for five years before finally being abandoned. Regazzoni remained with Tecno throughout his three years in Formula Two, although he drove most of the 1969 season for the Ferrari Formula Two team. In 1970, they took the European Formula Two Championship together.

==== Sports car racing ====
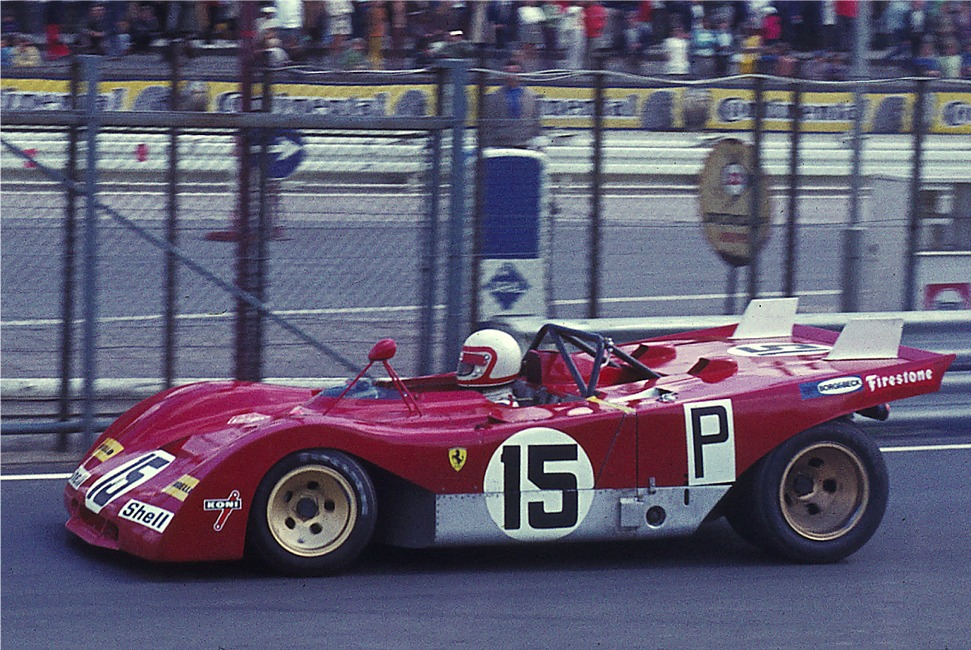
Regazzoni in a Ferrari 312PB at the 1971 Nürburgring 1000km

As well as single seater racing, Regazzoni participated in sports car racing, including the 1970 24 Hours of Le Mans where he and Arturo Merzario raced a Ferrari 512S. However, the pair retired after completing only 38 laps. This would prove to be Regazzoni's only appearance at the 24 Hours of Le Mans, although he tested for the 1972 event.

For the following two years, Regazzoni was a permanent fixture in Ferrari's sports car racing squad. With the new 312B-based 312P cars underneath him, Regazzoni regularly ran at or near the front of the field. Regularly partnered with Jacky Ickx, the pairing took second place in the BOAC 1000 km at Brands Hatch in 1971, and won the first heat during the Imola 500 km. Regazzoni also won the Kyalami 9 Hours race, this time in partnership with Brian Redman. Further successes followed in 1972, with second places at the 1000 km Buenos Aires, partnered again by Redman, and the prestigious Spa 1000 km race. The high point of the season came when the Regazzoni/Ickx partnership won the Monza 1000 km race.

With his departure from Ferrari in 1973, Regazzoni's sports car results dried up. His uncompetitive Alfa Romeo 33 TT was thoroughly outclassed by the Ferrari and Matra opposition. At the end of 1973 Ferrari withdrew from sports car racing, and Regazzoni's move to rejoin the Ferrari Formula One team in 1974 effectively ended his sports car career, as he could not then race for other manufacturers.

=== Formula One ===
==== 1970–1972: Ferrari ====
During the early races of the 1970 Formula One season Ferrari only entered one car, for Belgian Jacky Ickx, but at the fourth round in Belgium, the team decided to run a second car to try out some younger drivers. Italian Ignazio Giunti was given the second seat in Belgium, where he finished fourth, while Regazzoni took his place at the following round in the Netherlands, also finishing fourth. Giunti was back in the seat for the following Grand Prix in France, but finished fourteenth, three laps behind the winner and eventual 1970 World Champion Jochen Rindt.

Regazzoni was back in the Ferrari for the British Grand Prix, where he finished fourth again, but this time Regazzoni kept the race seat. Four podium finishes followed for Regazzoni during the final six rounds of the 1970 season, including a win at Monza, Ferrari's home race. However, the race was overshadowed by the death of Championship leader Rindt, during qualifying for the race. A first pole position, at the final round in Mexico, capped a hugely successful first season in the top formula. Regazzoni finished third in the Drivers' Championship with 33 points, 12 points behind posthumous World Champion Rindt.

Following the death of Giunti at a sports car event during the winter of 1971, Ferrari opted for Ickx and Regazzoni for the 1971 Formula One season. Prior to the start of the European legs of the Formula One World Championship, Regazzoni won the prestigious Race of Champions at Brands Hatch, beating Jackie Stewart into second place. Despite this early promise, the Ferrari 312B and B2 proved to be inferior to the Stewart/Tyrrell 003 combination. Regazzoni only managed three podium finishes during the season, as well as a pole position at the British Grand Prix. The Swiss finished seventh in the Drivers' Championship that year, 49 points behind World Champion Jackie Stewart.

Further disappointment for Regazzoni followed in 1972, with only a single podium finish, in Germany, although he scored two points more than the previous season. Regazzoni again finished seventh in the Drivers' Championship, 46 points behind World Champion Emerson Fittipaldi.

==== 1973: BRM ====
Regazzoni opted to leave Ferrari in 1973, in favour of Marlboro-sponsored BRM for what was reported as "an astronomical fee". Here he joined young driver Niki Lauda, and the two became firm friends. After a huge crash during the South African Grand Prix, he was pulled from the blazing wreckage by Mike Hailwood, who was later awarded the George Medal for his heroism in saving Regazzoni's life. It proved to be an unsuccessful year for Regazzoni, despite a pole position in the 1973 Argentine Grand Prix season opener. He was reported to have become disillusioned with "uncompetitive machinery" as he scored just two points during the entire season, his worst points haul from a full season in Formula One. He achieved a lowly 17th place in the championship.

==== 1974–1976: Back to Ferrari ====
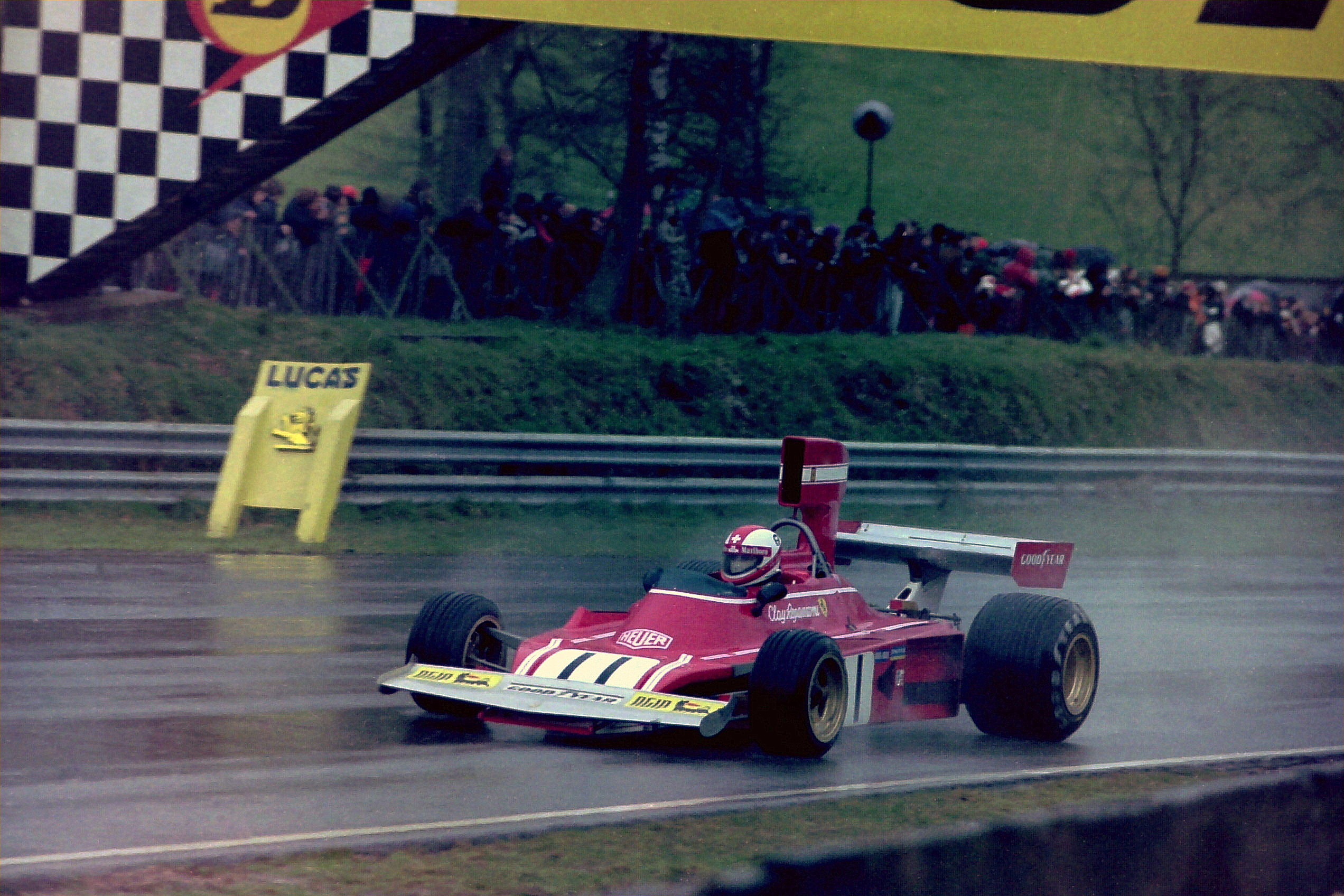
Regazzoni at the 1974 Race of Champions

Ferrari had a big personnel shake-up at the start of 1974, after Luca Cordero di Montezemolo was hired to run the Italian team. Both Regazzoni and, on Regazzoni's recommendation, Lauda were picked up by Ferrari. Regazzoni was soon back on the podium. Seven podium finishes, including a win in Germany, his first since his debut season win at Monza four years earlier, as well as a pole position at Nivelles, allowed Regazzoni to outscore the up-and-coming Lauda. Entering the last race of the season, in the USA Regazzoni was well in contention for the title, and only needed to finish ahead of rival, Emerson Fittipaldi, to take the crown. Regazzoni suffered handling problems during the race due to a defective shock absorber and could finish only 11th after two pit stops. He finished second in the Drivers' Championship, his career-best, just three points behind Fittipaldi.

Ferrari retained Lauda and Regazzoni's services for 1975 and the pair took six victories between them: five for Lauda, and one for Regazzoni at the 1975 Italian Grand Prix. Regazzoni also won his home Grand Prix, the non-championship Swiss Grand Prix, the only Swiss driver to have done so. Ferrari secured the Constructors' Championship, and Lauda won the first of his three World titles. Regazzoni finished fifth in the Drivers' Championship with 25 points.

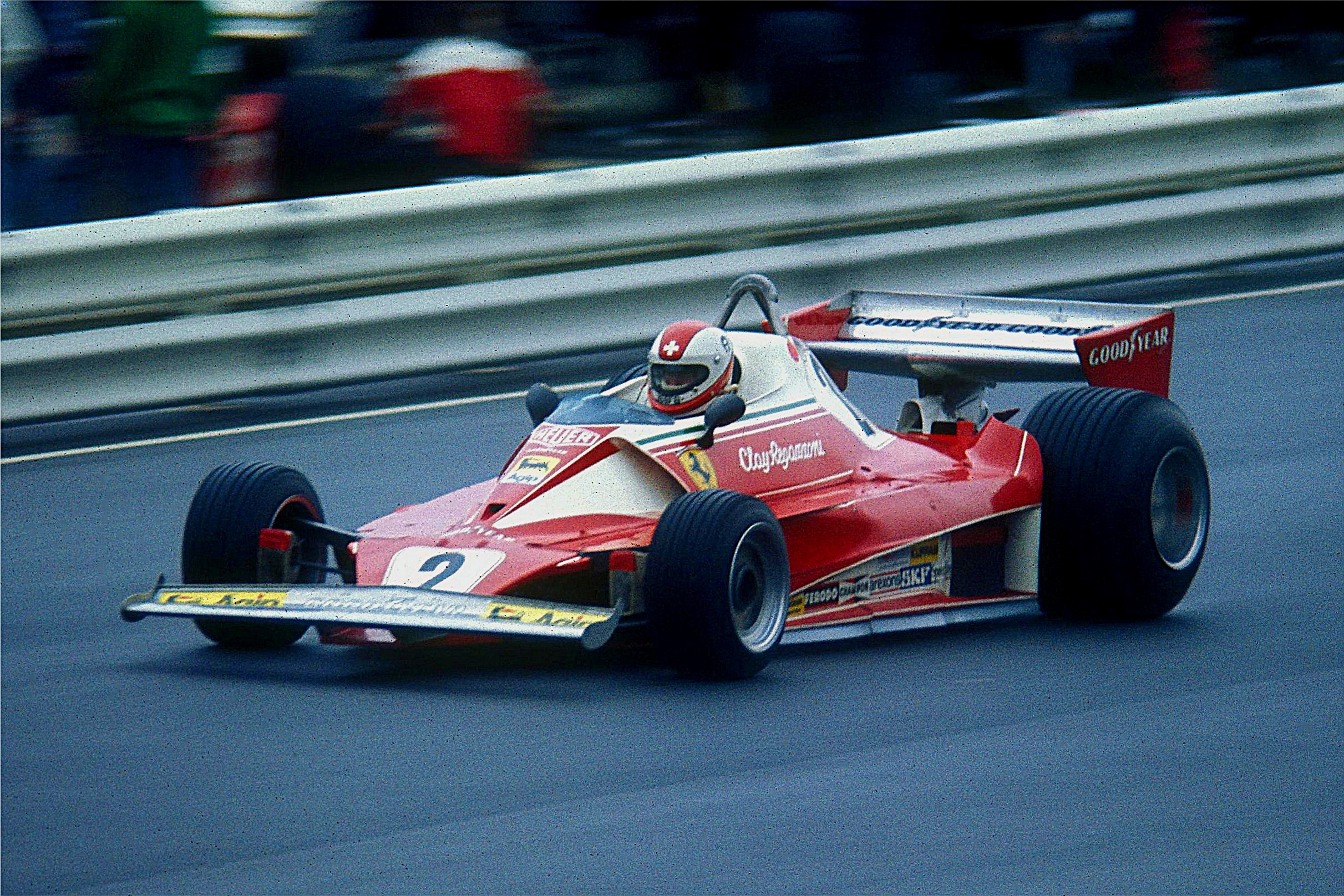
Regazzoni driving the Ferrari 312T at the Nürburgring in 1976

1976 would prove to be the start of Regazzoni's downward slide in Formula One. Despite a promising start of the season, with a dominating win from pole position at the inaugural Long Beach Grand Prix, and a further three podium finishes, Ferrari entered a period of internal turmoil following Lauda's accident at the Nürburgring. Following Lauda's loss of the Drivers' Championship at the very last race of the season in Japan, Ferrari elected to replace the Swiss with Carlos Reutemann despite Lauda's protest. The Argentine never got on with Lauda as well as Regazzoni did. When he left Ferrari, Regazzoni was the longest serving Ferrari driver with 73 races with the team. The record would hold for 12 years until Michele Alboreto broke it at the 1988 Hungarian Grand Prix.

==== 1977: Ensign ====
Following his release from Ferrari, Regazzoni opted for a move to the Ensign team. His move to such a small team surprised some, but Regazzoni opted for the small outfit in preference to an offer from Bernie Ecclestone to drive for Brabham, as he preferred "to race with nice people". His season with Ensign, despite managing a points finish on his debut in Argentina, was not successful. Regazzoni finished in the points only a further two times, and ended the season with a total of five points. In May Regazzoni participated in the Indianapolis 500 driving a McLaren-Offenhauser for Theodore Racing. He crashed heavily in practice but managed to qualify. He finished in 30th place after a fuel cell gave out during his first pit stop.

==== 1978: Shadow ====
Regazzoni moved to Shadow in 1978, as a replacement for Alan Jones who had left to join Williams. Only two points scoring finishes followed for Regazzoni and he finished the season 16th in the Drivers' Championship, 60 points behind World Champion Mario Andretti.

==== 1979: Williams ====
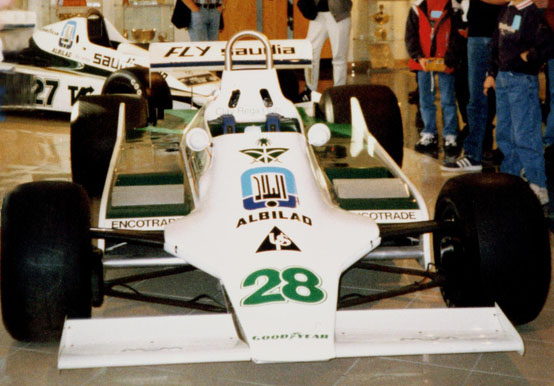
Regazzoni's Williams FW07 from 1979

Frank Williams gave Regazzoni his final drive in a competitive car alongside Alan Jones. The Williams FW07 proved to be very competitive, especially in the final part of the season, with FW07s winning all but two of the final seven races of the 1979 calendar. The first win was for Regazzoni, at Silverstone, the first of over 100 victories for the Williams Grand Prix team. In deference to the team's Saudi sponsors, he celebrated on the podium with Lilt. However, despite his achievement, once again he was replaced by Carlos Reutemann at the end of the season. At the Italian Grand Prix, motorsport journalist Nigel Roebuck asked Regazzoni why he continued to drive at the age of 40, with no prospect of a competitive seat. Regazzoni replied, "I love [Formula One], and most of all I love to drive racing cars. So why should I stop when I feel this way?". At the end of the year he was invited to compete in the 1980 International Race of Champions, the last active Formula One driver, alongside Mario Andretti, to do so.

==== 1980: Back with Ensign ====
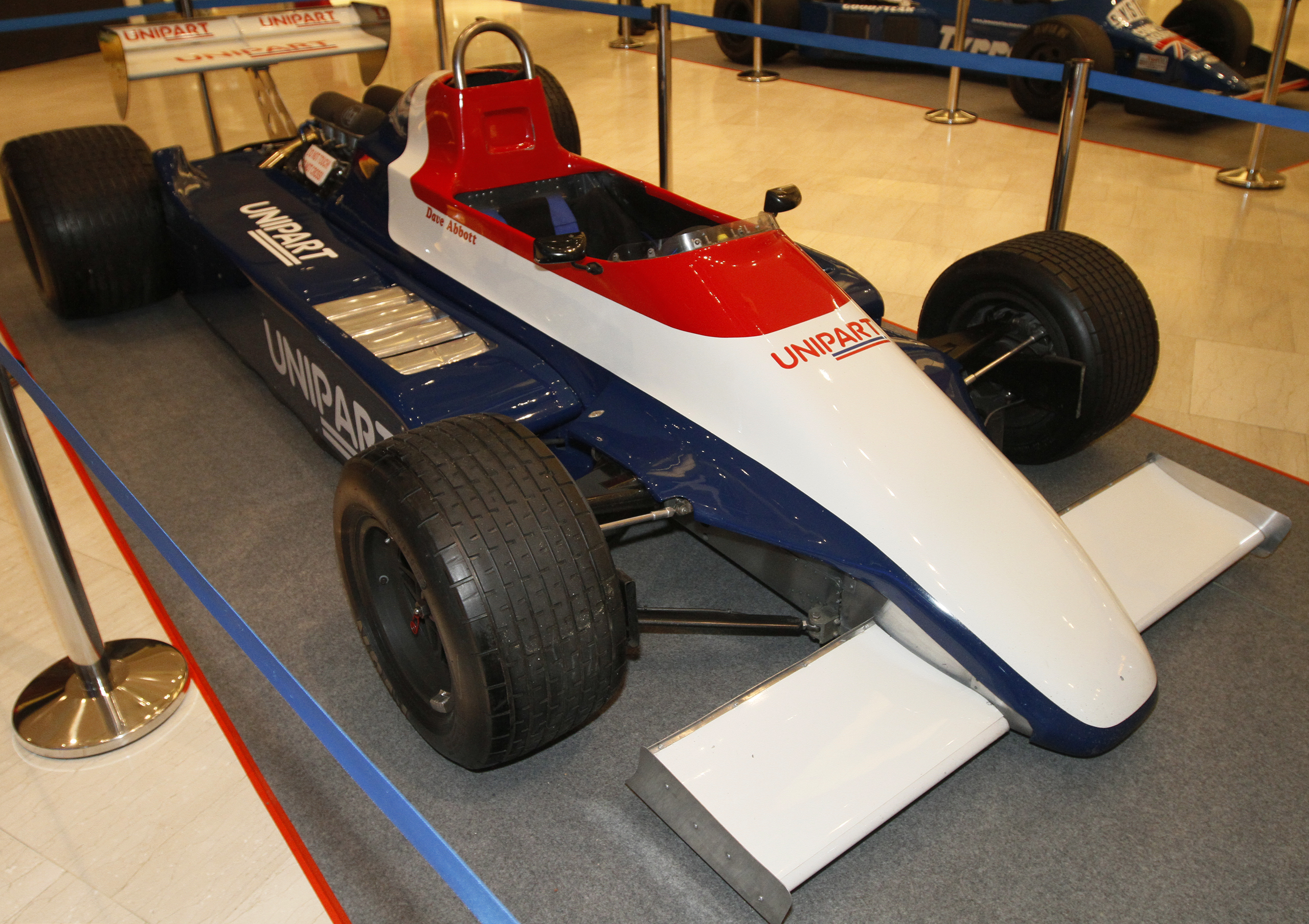
Regazzoni was driving the Ensign N180 chassis when he crashed at the 1980 United States Grand Prix West.

Lacking an offer for a competitive drive in 1980, Regazzoni re-joined Ensign. His season came to an abrupt end only four races into the year. He crashed during the 1980 United States Grand Prix West, held at Long Beach, when the brake pedal of his Ensign failed at the end of a long, high-speed straight travelling at approximately 280 km/h. Ricardo Zunino's retired Brabham was parked on the escape road. Regazzoni later recalled, "I hit Zunino's car, then bounced into the barrier. For about 10 minutes I lost consciousness. Then I remember terrible pain in my hips..." The crash left Regazzoni paralyzed from the waist down, ending his competitive career. On recovery, Regazzoni sued the race organisers, claiming their safety procedures were sub-standard. However, the race organisers demonstrated that the procedures were adequate and won the case.

=== After Formula One ===
After this accident, Regazzoni became known for his activities in helping disabled people get equal opportunities in life and society. Despite his disability, he was determined to live as full a life as possible. He won back his racing licence and became one of the first disabled drivers to participate in high-level motorsports. Although his injuries made a Formula One return impossible, he raced with some success in rally raids (e.g. the Dakar Rally) and sportscars (e.g. the 12 Hours of Sebring). These achievements paved the way for the wider acceptance of disabled persons in motoring and motorsports. His last competitive race was in 1990, although he was occasionally offered test drives in racing cars during the 1990s. In 1994, he returned to the Long Beach Grand Prix (at that point an IndyCar race) to compete as a Pro in the Toyota Pro/Celebrity Race.

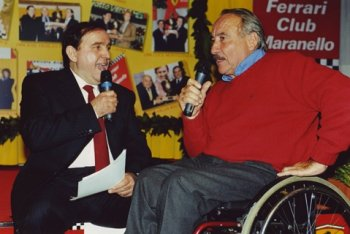
Regazzoni after his accident

An account of Regazzoni's life can be found in his autobiography È questione di cuore ("It's a Matter of Heart") published in the mid-1980s. His post-Formula One career occasionally saw him as a commentator for Swiss and Italian television. A second book about his experience at the Dakar Rally, E la corsa continua ("And the race goes on") was published in 1988. He once commented to Niki Lauda, his ten years younger teammate, that "if you drive as tensed up as you behave yourself towards women, you will never become great."

== Death ==
On 15 December 2006, Regazzoni was killed when the Chrysler Voyager he was driving hit the rear of a lorry on the Italian A1 motorway, near Parma. Crash investigators estimate that he was travelling at approximately 100 km/h at the time and, despite early speculation, an autopsy specifically excluded a heart attack from being responsible for Regazzoni's loss of control. His funeral was held on 23 December, in Lugano, and was attended by Niki Lauda, Arturo Merzario, Jackie Stewart, Emerson Fittipaldi, and Peter Sauber, among many luminaries from the Formula One world.

== Portrayal in media ==
In the 2013 Ron Howard film Rush, which depicts the rivalry between James Hunt and Niki Lauda in the 1976 Formula One season, he is portrayed by Pierfrancesco Favino.

== Racing record ==
=== Career summary ===
Season	Series	Team	Races	Wins	Poles	F/Laps	Podiums	Points	Position
1968	European Formula Two	Tecno Racing Team	6	0	0	0	1	13	6th
1969	European Formula Two	SEFAC Ferrari	3	0	0	0	0	5	10th
1969	European Formula Two	Tecno Racing Team	1	0	1	0	0	5	10th
1970	European Formula Two	Tecno Racing Team	8	3	3	1	5	44	**1st**
1970	Formula One	SEFAC Ferrari	8	1	1	3	4	33	**3rd**
1970	24 Hours of Le Mans	SEFAC Ferrari	1	0	0	0	0	N/A	DNF
1971	Formula One	SEFAC Ferrari	11	0	1	0	3	13	7th
1971	European Formula Two	Shell-Arnold Team	1	0	0	0	0	0	NC
1972	Formula One	SEFAC Ferrari	10	0	0	0	2	15	7th
1973	Formula One	Marlboro-BRM	14	0	1	0	0	2	17th
1974	Formula One	SEFAC Ferrari	15	1	1	3	7	42	**2nd**
1975	Formula One	SEFAC Ferrari	14	1	0	4	3	25	5th
1976	Formula One	SEFAC Ferrari	15	1	1	3	4	31	5th
1977	Formula One	Team Tissot Ensign with Castrol	15	0	0	0	0	5	17th
1977	European Formula Two	Project Four Racing	1	0	0	0	0	0	NC^{‡}
1977	European Formula Two	Ardmore Racing	1	0	0	0	0	0	NC^{‡}
1977	USAC Championship Car	Theodore Racing	1	0	0	0	0	0	NC
1978	Formula One	Villiger Shadow	11	0	0	0	0	4	16th
1978	European Formula Two	Everest Racing Team	1	0	0	0	0	0	NC
1979	Formula One	Albilad-Saudia Racing Team	15	1	0	2	5	29	5th
1979	BMW M1 Procar Championship	BMW Motorsport	8	0	0	0	2	61	**3rd**
1979	European Formula Two	Racing Team Everest	3	0	0	0	0	0	NC
1980	Formula One	Unipart Racing Team	4	0	0	0	0	0	NC

^{‡} Graded drivers not eligible for European Formula Two Championship points

=== Complete European Formula Two Championship results ===
(key) (Races in bold indicate pole position; races in italics indicate fastest lap)

Year	Entrant	Chassis	Engine	1	2	3	4	5	6	7	8	9	10	11	12	13	Pos.	Pts
1968	Tecno Racing Team	Tecno TF68	Ford	HOC	THR	JAR; 5	PAL; 3	TUL	ZAN; Ret	PER; 4	HOC; Ret	VLL; NC					6th	13
1969	Scuderia Ferrari	Ferrari 166	Ferrari	THR; 10	HOC; DNS	NÜR; Ret	JAR; 11	TUL									10th	5
1969	Tecno Racing Team	Tecno TF69	Ford						**PER**; 4	VLL							10th	5
1970	Tecno Racing Team	Tecno TF69	Ford	THR; 8	HOC; 1	BAR; 8	**ROU**; 2										1st	44
1970	Tecno Racing Team	Tecno TF70	Ford					PER; 1	**TUL**; Ret	**IMO**; 1	HOC; 2						1st	44
1971	Shell-Arnold Team	March 712M	Ford	HOC	THR	NÜR	JAR	PAL	ROU	MAN	TUL	ALB	VLL	VAL; Ret			NC	0
1977	Project Four Racing	Ralt RT1	BMW	SIL	THR	HOC	NÜR; Ret	VLL	PAU	MUG	ROU	NOG	PER				NC	0^{‡}
1977	Ardmore Racing	Chevron B40	Hart											MIS; 6	EST	DON	NC	0^{‡}
1978	Everest Racing Team	Chevron B40	BMW	THR	HOC	NÜR	PAU	MUG	VLL	ROU	DON	NOG	PER	MIS; Ret	HOC		NC	0
1979	Racing Team Everest	March 792	BMW	SIL; Ret	HOC	THR	NÜR	VLL	MUG; Ret	PAU	HOC	ZAN	PER	MIS; Ret	DON		NC	0

^{‡} Graded drivers not eligible for European Formula Two Championship points

=== Complete 24 Hours of Le Mans results ===
Year	Team	Co-Drivers	Car	Class	Laps	Pos.	Class Pos.
1970	(Italy) SpA Ferrari SEFAC	(Italy) Arturo Merzario	Ferrari 512S	S 5.0	38	DNF	DNF

=== Complete Formula One World Championship results ===
(key) (Races in bold indicate pole position; races in italics indicate fastest lap)

Year	Entrant	Chassis	Engine	1	2	3	4	5	6	7	8	9	10	11	12	13	14	15	16	17	WDC	Pts
1970	SEFAC Ferrari	Ferrari 312B	Ferrari 001 3.0 F12	RSA	ESP	MON	BEL	NED; 4	FRA	GBR; 4	GER; Ret	AUT; 2	ITA; 1	CAN; 2	USA; 13	**MEX**; 2					**3rd**	**33**
1971	SEFAC Ferrari	Ferrari 312B	Ferrari 001 3.0 F12	RSA; 3	ESP; Ret																7th	13
1971	SEFAC Ferrari	Ferrari 312B2	Ferrari 001/1 3.0 F12			MON; Ret	NED; 3	FRA; Ret	**GBR**; Ret	GER; 3	AUT; Ret	ITA; Ret	CAN; Ret	USA; 6							7th	13
1972	SEFAC Ferrari	Ferrari 312B2	Ferrari 001/1 3.0 F12	ARG; 4	RSA; 12	ESP; 3	MON; Ret	BEL; Ret	FRA	GBR	GER; 2	AUT; Ret	ITA; Ret	CAN; 5	USA; 8						7th	15
1973	Marlboro BRM	BRM P160D	BRM P142 3.0 V12	**ARG**; 7	BRA; 6	RSA; Ret															17th	2
1973	Marlboro BRM	BRM P160E	BRM P142 3.0 V12				ESP; 9	BEL; 10	MON; Ret	SWE; 9	FRA; 12	GBR; 7	NED; 8	GER; Ret	AUT; 6	ITA; Ret	CAN	USA; 8			17th	2
1974	SEFAC Ferrari	Ferrari 312B3	Ferrari 001/11 3.0 F12	ARG; 3	BRA; 2	RSA; Ret	ESP; 2	**BEL**; 4	MON; 4	SWE; Ret	NED; 2	FRA; 3	GBR; 4	GER; 1	AUT; 5	ITA; Ret	CAN; 2	USA; 11			**2nd**	**52**
1975	SEFAC Ferrari	Ferrari 312B3	Ferrari 001/11 3.0 F12	ARG; 4	BRA; 4																5th	25
1975	SEFAC Ferrari	Ferrari 312T	Ferrari 015 3.0 F12			RSA; 16†	ESP; NC	MON; Ret	BEL; 5	SWE; 3	NED; 3	FRA; Ret	GBR; 13	GER; Ret	AUT; 7	ITA; 1	USA; Ret				5th	25
1976	SEFAC Ferrari	Ferrari 312T	Ferrari 015 3.0 F12	BRA; 7	RSA; Ret	**USW**; 1															5th	31
1976	SEFAC Ferrari	Ferrari 312T2	Ferrari 015 3.0 F12				ESP; 11	BEL; 2	MON; 14†	SWE; 6	FRA; Ret	GBR; DSQ	GER; 9	AUT	NED; 2	ITA; 2	CAN; 6	USA; 7	JPN; 5		5th	31
1977	Team Tissot Ensign with Castrol	Ensign N177	Ford Cosworth DFV 3.0 V8	ARG; 6	BRA; Ret	RSA; 9	USW; Ret	ESP; Ret	MON; DNQ	BEL; Ret	SWE; 7	FRA; 7	GBR; DNQ	GER; Ret	AUT; Ret	NED; Ret	ITA; 5	USA; 5	CAN; Ret	JPN; Ret	17th	5
1978	Villiger Shadow	Shadow DN8	Ford Cosworth DFV 3.0 V8	ARG; 15	BRA; 5	RSA; DNQ	USW; 10														16th	4
1978	Villiger Shadow	Shadow DN9	Ford Cosworth DFV 3.0 V8					MON; DNQ	BEL; Ret	ESP; 15	SWE; 5	FRA; Ret	GBR; Ret	GER; DNQ	AUT; NC	NED; DNQ	ITA; NC	USA; 14	CAN; DNQ		16th	4
1979	Albilad-Saudia Racing Team	Williams FW06	Ford Cosworth DFV 3.0 V8	ARG; 10	BRA; 15	RSA; 9	USW; Ret														5th	29 (32)
1979	Albilad-Saudia Racing Team	Williams FW07	Ford Cosworth DFV 3.0 V8					ESP; Ret	BEL; Ret	MON; 2	FRA; 6	GBR; 1	GER; 2	AUT; 5	NED; Ret	ITA; 3	CAN; 3	USA; Ret			5th	29 (32)
1980	Unipart Racing Team	Ensign N180	Ford Cosworth DFV 3.0 V8	ARG; NC	BRA; Ret	RSA; 9	USW; Ret	BEL	MON	FRA	GBR	GER	AUT	NED	ITA	CAN	USA				NC	0

† Driver did not finish the race, but was still classified as they completed at least 90% of the race distance.

=== Non-championship Formula One results ===
(key) (Races in bold indicate pole position; results in italics indicate fastest lap)

Year	Entrant	Chassis	Engine	1	2	3	4	5	6	7	8
1971	Scuderia Ferrari SpA SEFAC	Ferrari 312B2	Ferrari 001/1 3.0 F12	ARG	ROC; 1	QUE	SPR	INT			
1971	Scuderia Ferrari SpA SEFAC	Ferrari 312B	Ferrari 001 3.0 F12						RIN; NC	OUL	VIC
1973	Marlboro BRM	BRM P160E	BRM P142 3.0 V12	ROC	INT; 3						
1974	Scuderia Ferrari SpA SEFAC	Ferrari 312B3	Ferrari 001/11 3.0 F12	PRE	ROC; 5	INT					
1975	Scuderia Ferrari SpA SEFAC	Ferrari 312T	Ferrari 015 3.0 F12	ROC	INT	SUI; 1					
1977	Team Tissot Ensign with Castrol	Ensign N177	Ford Cosworth DFV 3.0 V8	ROC; 13							
1978	Shadow Racing Team	Shadow DN9	Ford Cosworth DFV 3.0 V8	INT; Ret							

=== Indianapolis 500 results ===
Year	Chassis	Engine	Start	Finish	Team
1977	McLaren M16C/D	Offy	29	30	Theodore Racing

== Notes ==
Sporting positions
Preceded by Johnny Servoz-Gavin	European Formula Two; Champion; 1970	Succeeded by Ronnie Peterson
Preceded by Jackie Stewart	Brands Hatch Race of Champions; Winner; 1971	Succeeded by Emerson Fittipaldi
Awards
Preceded by Werner Dössegger	Swiss Sportsman of the Year; 1974	Succeeded by Rolf Bernhard
