= Memphis (cigarette) =

Austrian cigarette brand

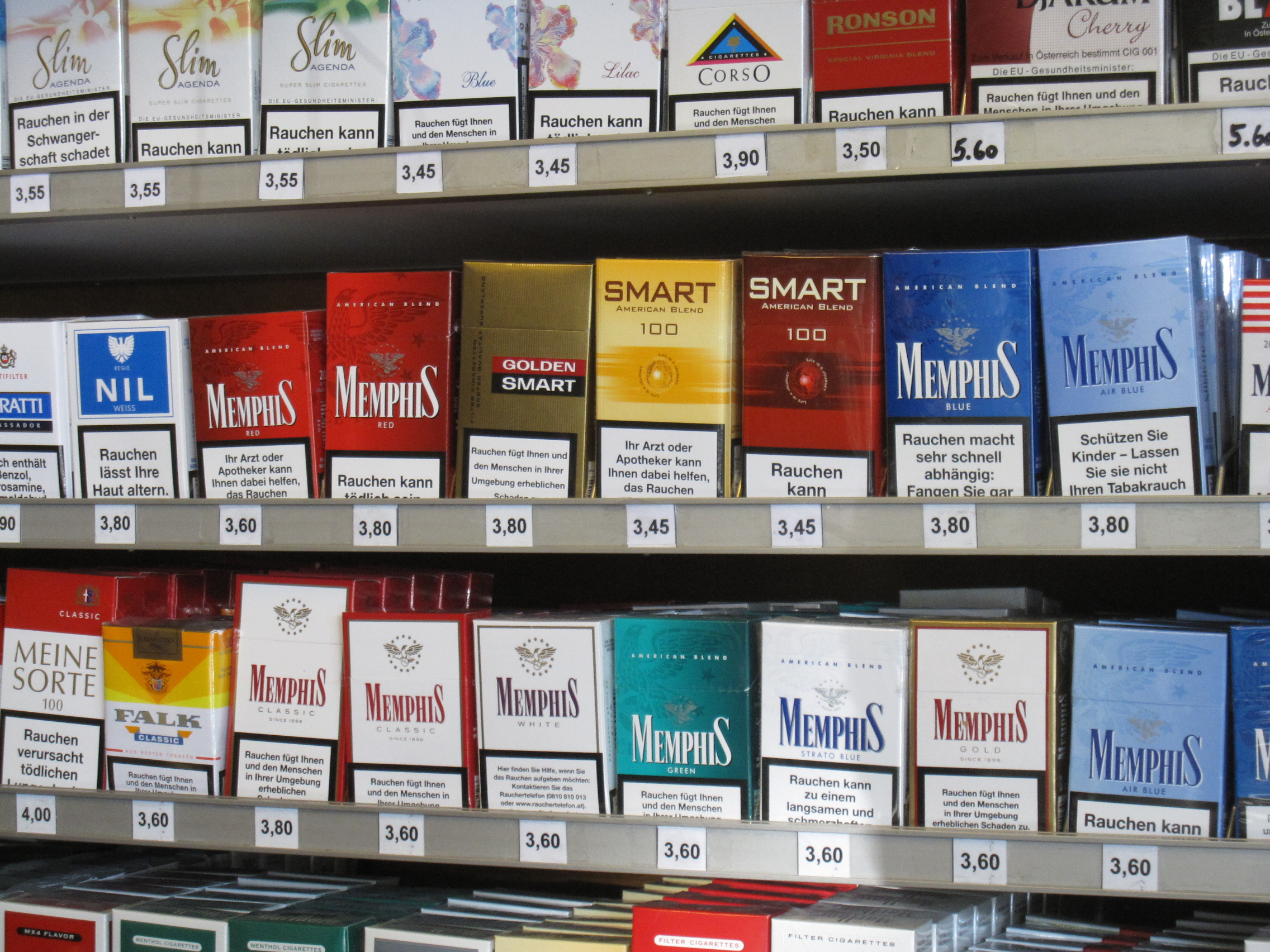
- A lot of different Austrian packs of Memphis on display
- Product type: Cigarette
- Current owner: Austria Tabak, a division of Gallaher Group which is owned by Japan Tobacco
- Country: Austria-Hungary
- Introduced: 1897; 129 years ago
- Markets: See Markets

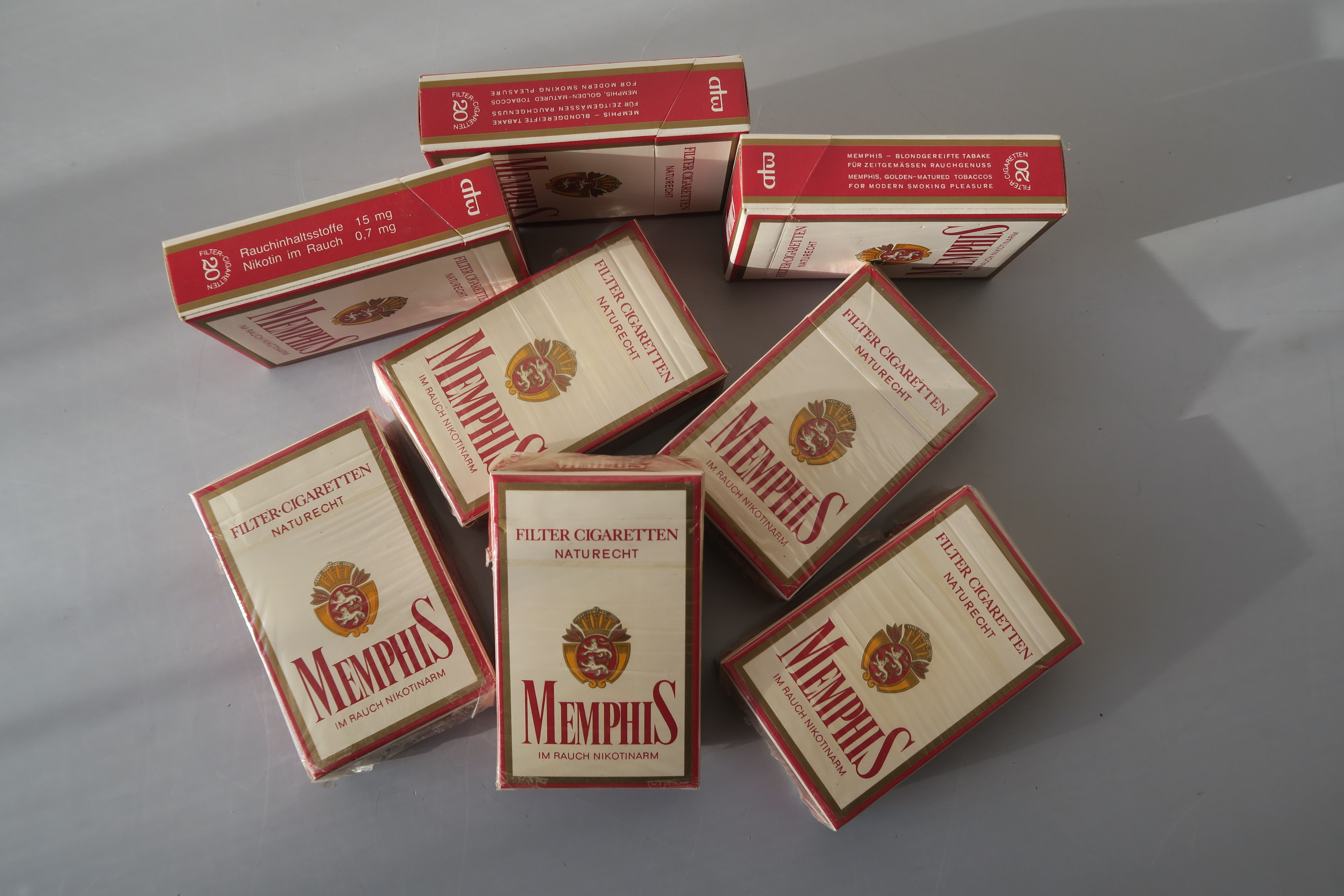
Original Memphis Austria Tabak cigarettes (1981)

Memphis is an Austrian brand of cigarettes, currently owned and manufactured by "Austria Tabak", which is owned by the Gallaher Group, a subsidiary of Japan Tobacco.

== History ==
Memphis was launched on March 1, 1897 by the Österreichische Tabakregie (later Austria Tabak), the state monopoly tobacco company founded in 1784. There has been confusion regarding the founding date of Memphis. From the 1980s until 2003 there are documents from Austria Tabak where they declare the introduction year of Memphis as 1897, but in 2005 they launched a new line called Memphis 1896 - and from there on they printed "Since 1896" on the Memphis packs. The name symbolized the origin of the tobacco used in Egypt.

Austria Tabak was privatized in the late 1990s, and the British Gallaher Group became the full owner in 2002. Japan Tobacco bought the Gallaher Group in 2007.

In 2011, the Austria Tabak factory in Hainburg an der Donau closed when production fully moved to foreign countries. The reason for this is that the number of smokers declined, smuggling increased, production costs increased, and ancillary wage costs increased.

Since 1989, the brand has been a market leader in Austria. However, Altria's Marlboro became the most popular brand in Austria, beating Memphis and Austria Tabak with a market share of 35.5 percent versus 34.5 percent. In 2000, nearly one-third of all the smoked cigarettes in Austria were manufactured by Memphis. In 2010, Austria Tabak with Memphis only had a share of 14.2 percent.

Various advertising posters were made to promote Memphis cigarettes throughout the 20th, as well as the 21st century.

== Markets ==
Memphis is mainly sold in Austria, but also is or was sold in Germany, Switzerland, Italy, Hungary, Czech Republic, Bulgaria, Greece, Slovakia, Slovenia, Ukraine, Russia, China, Philippines, and Paraguay.

== See also ==
- Tobacco smoking
