= Opel (disambiguation) =

Opel is a German car manufacturer.

Opel may also refer to:

- OPEL Networks, a former Australian telecommunications provider
- Opel (album), an album by musician Syd Barrett

== People ==
- Adam Opel (1837–1895), founder of Opel, the company
- Adolf Opel (1935–2018), Austrian writer, filmmaker, and editor
- Barbara Opel (born 1963), American caretaker and criminal
- Carl von Opel (1869–1927), co-founder of Opel
- Friedrich Opel (1875–1938), German cyclist, race car driver and industrial engineer
- Fritz von Opel (1899–1971), German automotive engineer
- Georg von Opel (born 1966), great-grandson of Adam Opel
- Hans von Opel (1889–1948), son of Carl von Opel
- Jackie Opel (1938–1970), Barbadian singer
- John R. Opel (1925–2011), U.S. computer businessman
- Nancy Opel (born c. 1957), American singer, actress, and teacher
- Rikky von Opel (born 1947), Liechtenstein racing driver
- Robert Opel (1939–1979), American photographer
- Sophie Opel (1840–1913), industrialist and wife of Adam Opel
- Wilhelm von Opel (1871–1948), co-founder of Opel

== See also ==
- Opal (disambiguation)
