= Friedrich Opel =

German cyclist, racing driver and engineer (1875–1938)

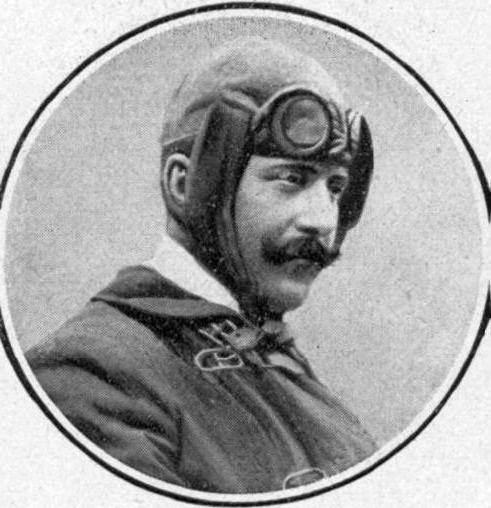

Personal information
- Full name: Friedrich Franz Opel
- Nationality: German
- Born: 30 August 1875 Rüsselsheim am Main
- Died: 30 August 1938 (aged 63) Vienna

Sport
- Country: Germany
- Sport: Cycling and Auto racing

Friedrich Franz Opel (April 30, 1875 – August 30, 1938) was a German cyclist, race car driver and industrial engineer. He was known for introducing the automobile assembly line to Germany.

== Information ==
=== Personal life ===
Opel was born on April 30, 1875. His parents were Adam Opel and Sophie Opel, part of a family who were known as "The Ford's of Germany" for creating the Opel automobile manufacturing company. He had 4 siblings: Carl, Wilhelm, Heinrich and Ludwig. He was often referred to as Friedrich or Fritz. He studied mechanical engineering at Hochschule Mittweida University from 1894 to 1897 and later became the chief designer at Opel. In 1902, he was awarded a license to produce single cylinders for automobiles in Germany. In 1920, he commissioned "Villa Wenske", an estate and tourist attraction in Germany. In 1927, he was awarded an honorary doctorate from Technische Universität Darmstadt. He was affiliated with the sports club SC Opel Rüsselsheim, which was named after his family and was created in 1928. He and his brothers sold the cycling department of Opel in 1936 due to financial issues.

=== Cycling ===
Opel was said to have won 180 titles on Opel manufactured cycles and altogether, he and his four brothers were said to have won 560 races and 13 national titles. He began competing in cycling races in 1891 and was said to be one of August Lehr's rivals. He has been credited with winning the 1894 Basel - Kleve, the 1896 Amateur Sprint Track National Championship and the 1897 Stayers Elite Track National Championship.

=== Auto racing ===
Opel won the 1905 Circuit de Francford-sur-le-Main and won the 1922 Class 2L Opel-Rennbahin. Opel was an on-board mechanic and driver with Carl Jörns in the 1904 Coupe automobile Gordon Bennett. Opel finished 21st in the 1908 French Grand Prix. Opel was later named to the Automotive Hall of Fame in 1998.

== Death ==
Opel died on August 30, 1938, at the age of 63 due to heart disease. He had been in good health and his death was unexpected.
