= Baiduri =

Baiduri may refer to:

- Baiduri Bank (est. 1994), a bank in Brunei
- HD 20868 b (planet), Star Intan, Constellation Fornax; named after the Malay word for opal
- Desa Baiduri (Malay: Baiduri Town, Opal Town, Desa Opal), Penang, Malaysia; a district in Paya Terubong (state constituency)
- Baiduri (BRT station), a station on the Iskandar Malaysia Bus Rapid Transit

== See also ==
- Opal (disambiguation)
