= Opals (disambiguation) =

Opals are gemstones.

Opals may also refer to:

- OPALS, space experiment
- Australia women's national basketball team
- Opal's Steak House
- OPALS, Ogren Plant Allergy Scale

== See also ==
- Opal (disambiguation)
- Opel (disambiguation)
- Opalski cells
