= 1973 British Grand Prix =

Formula One motor race

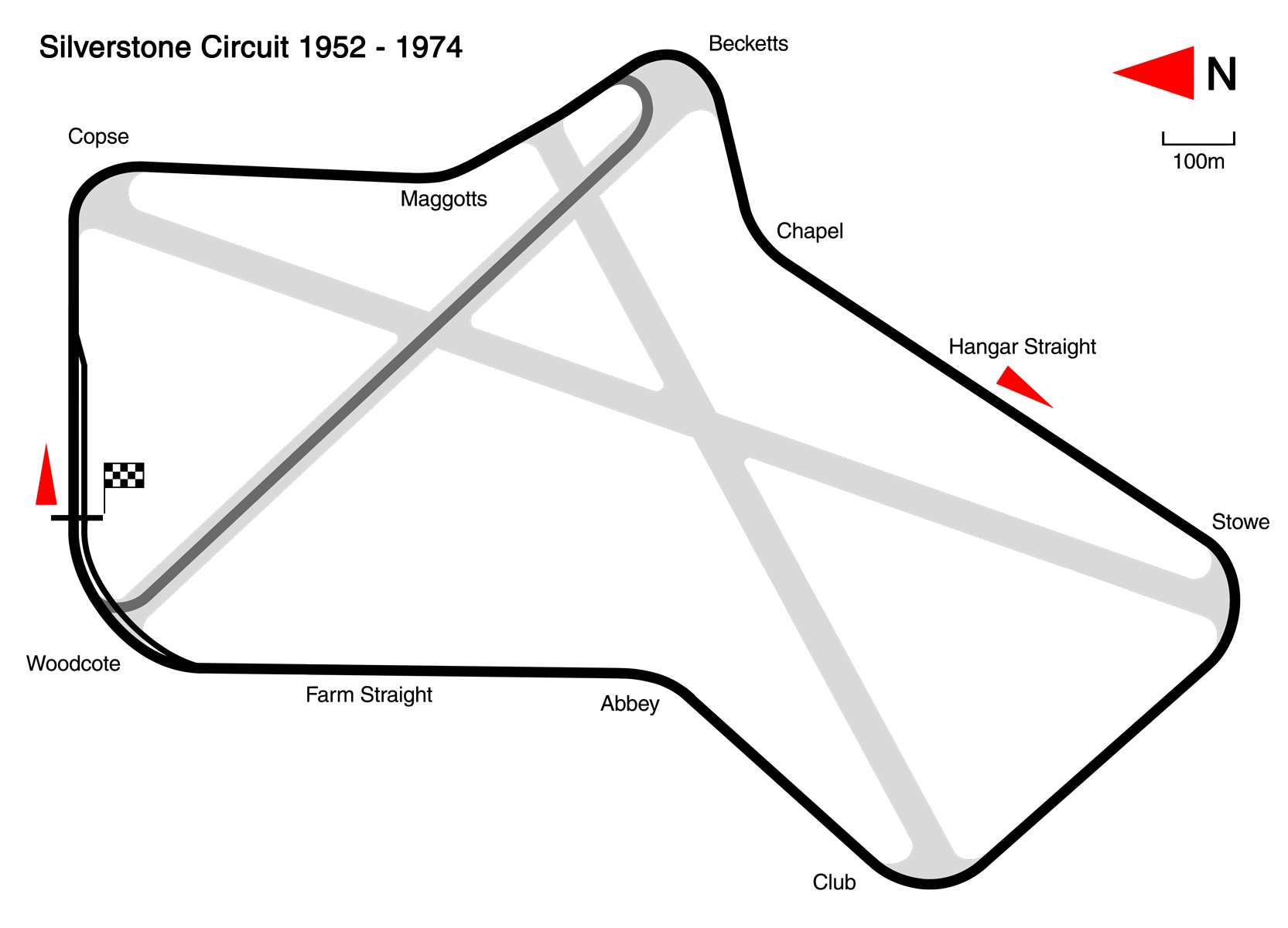

Race details
- Date: 14 July 1973
- Official name: John Player Grand Prix
- Location: Silverstone Circuit, Northamptonshire, Great Britain
- Course: Permanent racing facility
- Course length: 4.711 km (2.927 miles)
- Distance: 67 laps, 315.597 km (197.248 miles)
- Weather: Dry

Pole position
Driver	(Sweden) Ronnie Peterson	Lotus-Ford
- Time: 1:16.3

Fastest lap
Driver	(United Kingdom) James Hunt	March-Ford
- Time: 1:18.6 on lap 50

Podium
First	(United States) Peter Revson	McLaren-Ford
Second	(Sweden) Ronnie Peterson	Lotus-Ford
Third	(New Zealand) Denny Hulme	McLaren-Ford

The 1973 British Grand Prix (formally the John Player Grand Prix) was a Formula One (F1) motor race held at Silverstone on 14 July 1973. It was race 9 of 15 in both the 1973 World Championship of Drivers and the 1973 International Cup for Formula One Manufacturers. The race is known for the first lap pile-up, which ultimately caused eleven cars to retire. The accident happened when Jody Scheckter, running fourth in his McLaren, spun across the track at Woodcote Corner at the end of the first lap, causing many other cars to collide and crash. The incident eliminated nine cars, including all three works Surtees cars, while Brabham driver Andrea de Adamich suffered a broken ankle that ended his F1 career. The race was stopped at the end of the second lap, before being restarted over the original 67-lap distance with 18 of the original 29 cars. David Purley and Graham McRae had retired in separate incidents.

On the first start, a swift start by Jackie Stewart brought him from fourth to first in less than half a lap. At Becketts Corner, Stewart out-braked race leader Ronnie Peterson and took the lead. As the massive pile-up at the end of the first lap caused the race to be restarted, Stewart had to start from fourth again. This time it was Niki Lauda who had an excellent start and moved up behind Peterson into second, with Stewart third. Stewart passed Lauda on lap 2, and charged after Peterson. On lap 6, Stewart again tried to pass Peterson for the lead but the Swedish driver shut the door; Stewart lost control of his Tyrrell and spun off into the thick grass. Although he was able to continue, Stewart ended up finishing 10th, one lap down.

Another notable drive came from James Hunt in his Hesketh Racing March, who ran fourth for most of the race and was part of a four-way battle for the lead between himself, Peterson, Denny Hulme, and Peter Revson. American driver Revson took his first Grand Prix victory by 2.8 seconds from Peterson. The pile-up was to be a factor in this being the last World Championship F1 race held on the original Silverstone layout; a chicane would be added at Woodcote shortly before the 1975 event. Grand Prix motorcycle racing, which would come to Silverstone from the Isle of Man TT in 1977, would use the original layout until 1986.

== Qualifying ==
=== Qualifying classification ===
Pos.	Driver	Constructor	Time	No
1	Ronnie Peterson	Lotus-Ford	1:16.3	1
2	Denny Hulme	McLaren-Ford	1:16.5	2
3	Peter Revson	McLaren-Ford	1:16.5	3
4	Jackie Stewart	Tyrrell-Ford	1:16.7	4
5	Emerson Fittipaldi	Lotus-Ford	1:16.7	5
6	Jody Scheckter	McLaren-Ford	1:16.9	6
7	François Cevert	Tyrrell-Ford	1:17.3	7
8	Carlos Reutemann	Brabham-Ford	1:17.4	8
9	Niki Lauda	BRM	1:17.4	9
10	Clay Regazzoni	BRM	1:17.5	10
11	James Hunt	March-Ford	1:17.6	11
12	Mike Hailwood	Surtees-Ford	1:18.0	12
13	Wilson Fittipaldi	Brabham-Ford	1:18.1	13
14	Jochen Mass	Surtees-Ford	1:18.3	14
15	Carlos Pace	Surtees-Ford	1:18.3	15
16	David Purley	March-Ford	1:18.4	16
17	Jean-Pierre Beltoise	BRM	1:18.4	17
18	Howden Ganley	Iso-Ford	1:18.6	18
19	Jacky Ickx	Ferrari	1:18.9	19
20	Andrea de Adamich	Brabham-Ford	1:19.1	20
21	Rikky von Opel	Ensign-Ford	1:19.2	21
22	Roger Williamson	March-Ford	1:19.5	22
23	John Watson	Brabham-Ford	1:20.1	23
24	Mike Beuttler	March-Ford	1:20.1	24
25	George Follmer	Shadow-Ford	1:20.3	25
26	Jackie Oliver	Shadow-Ford	1:20.3	26
27	Graham Hill	Shadow-Ford	1:20.5	27
28	Graham McRae	Iso-Ford	1:20.8	28
29	Chris Amon	Tecno	1:21.0	29

== Race ==
=== First start and multi-car pileup ===
The race started at 2:00pm British Summer Time (UTC+0). It featured the most cars to start a Grand Prix as it featured 28 cars in rows of three by two.

Ronnie Peterson led away but a very quick start by Jackie Stewart brought him from fourth to second, as Stewart passed Peterson to take the lead at Beckets. Carlos Reutemann was in third with Denny Hulme and Jody Scheckter behind him. As the exited Woodcote corner to complete the first lap, Stewart led Peterson and Reutemann but carnage was happening behind them. Scheckter tried to pass Hulme on the outside Scheckter's car went wide and spun right across the track and it hit the retaining wall of the pits and bounced back into the middle of the track. Hulme escaped undamaged, as Francois Cevert, James Hunt, Peter Revson, and Clay Regazzoni also went by. The big one then happened as Scheckter's car ricocheted back from the pit wall, Revson struck Scheckter's rear wing, and then all hell broke loose as the rest of the field crashed into the wrecks or dodged about to miss the wreckage. Nine cars were involved in the resulting carnage, Andrea de Adamich had crashed headlong into the barriers on the outside of the track and he was trapped in the cockpit of his Brabham with a broken ankle. Apart from minor bruises and shakings, no one else was hurt but the Surtees cars of Mike Hailwood, Carlos Pace, and Jochen Mass were smashed up. The Shadow's were also involved: Jackie Oliver's car was wrecked, while George Follmer's car was ripped open. The Embassy Hill-entered Shadow of Graham Hill was struck in the rear and a wishbone broken; Hill drove it round back to the pits under its own power. The BRM of Jean-Pierre Beltoise and the works March of Roger Williamson were wrecked, as was the McLaren of Scheckter. It would be F1's biggest race start crash until the 1998 Belgian Grand Prix took out thirteen cars; no one was injured.

The race organisation acted instantly and the race was red flagged indicating without argument or discussion that the race was stopped and would be started again later. Meanwhile, those ahead of the accident were still racing until they ended the lap, when they all came to a rapid stop at the scene of the crash. It took 30 minutes to release de Adamich from the wreckage of the Brabham, plus an hour to clear away the wrecked cars and the debris. The cars that escaped were wheeled back to the starting grid and Hill's Shadow was repaired in the pits, and Niki Lauda's BRM that had been in the pits all the time had a new drive-shaft fitted. Hunt's March needed a new airbox as his original one was damaged in the wreck and borrowed Mike Beuttler's airbox from his car.

=== Second start ===
Drivers were allowed to use spare cars but none were used, Lauda's BRM and Hill's Shadow having been repaired during the red flag period. Non-starters included de Adamich who had been taken to hospital, Scheckter who was barred by McLaren as several team bosses including John Surtees wanted to throw him out for causing the crash, Graham McRae's Iso-Marlboro which had a throttle issue and could not restart, and David Purley's March which had spun off before the big one and did not restart. Other drivers who did not take the restart included Oliver, Follmer, Beltoise, Williamson, Purley, Pace, Hailwood, and Mass. It was 3.30 p.m. before the track was clear and there were nineteen starters ready for the restart over the original distance on 67 laps. At 3:35 pm, the depleted field moved up on to the starting grid. Everyone took up their original positions, leaving gaps for those who had been eliminated. This time it was Lauda who had an excellent start and moved up behind Peterson into second, with Stewart third. Stewart passed Lauda on lap 2 and charged after Peterson. On lap 6, Stewart again tried to pass Peterson for the lead but the Swedish driver shut the door; Stewart lost control of his Tyrrell and spun off into the thick grass. Although he was able to continue, Stewart ended up finishing 10th, one lap down.

=== Classification ===
Pos	No	Driver	Constructor	Laps	Time/Retired	Grid	Points
1	8	(United States) Peter Revson	McLaren-Ford	67	1:29:18.5	3	9
2	2	(Sweden) Ronnie Peterson	Lotus-Ford	67	+ 2.8	1	6
3	7	(New Zealand) Denny Hulme	McLaren-Ford	67	+ 3.0	2	4
4	27	(United Kingdom) James Hunt	March-Ford	67	+ 3.4	11	3
5	6	(France) François Cevert	Tyrrell-Ford	67	+ 36.6	7	2
6	10	(Argentina) Carlos Reutemann	Brabham-Ford	67	+ 44.7	8	1
7	19	(Switzerland) Clay Regazzoni	BRM	67	+ 1:11.7	10	
8	3	(Belgium) Jacky Ickx	Ferrari	67	+ 1:17.4	19	
9	25	(New Zealand) Howden Ganley	Iso-Marlboro-Ford	66	+1 lap	18	
10	5	(United Kingdom) Jackie Stewart	Tyrrell-Ford	66	+1 lap	4	
11	15	(United Kingdom) Mike Beuttler	March-Ford	65	+2 Laps	24	
12	21	(Austria) Niki Lauda	BRM	63	+4 laps	9	
13	28	(Liechtenstein) Rikky von Opel	Ensign-Ford	61	+6 laps	21	
Ret	11	(Brazil) Wilson Fittipaldi	Brabham-Ford	44	Oil leak	13	
Ret	1	(Brazil) Emerson Fittipaldi	Lotus-Ford	36	Transmission	5	
Ret	29	(United Kingdom) John Watson	Brabham-Ford	36	Fuel system	23	
Ret	12	(United Kingdom) Graham Hill	Shadow-Ford	24	Chassis	27	
Ret	22	(New Zealand) Chris Amon	Tecno	6	Fuel system	29	
Ret	30	(South Africa) Jody Scheckter	McLaren-Ford	0	Collision	6	
Ret	23	(United Kingdom) Mike Hailwood	Surtees-Ford	0	Collision	12	
Ret	31	(West Germany) Jochen Mass	Surtees-Ford	0	Collision	14	
Ret	24	(Brazil) Carlos Pace	Surtees-Ford	0	Collision	15	
Ret	20	(France) Jean-Pierre Beltoise	BRM	0	Collision	17	
Ret	9	(Italy) Andrea de Adamich	Brabham-Ford	0	Collision	20	
Ret	14	(United Kingdom) Roger Williamson	March-Ford	0	Collision	22	
Ret	16	(United States) George Follmer	Shadow-Ford	0	Collision	25	
Ret	17	(United Kingdom) Jackie Oliver	Shadow-Ford	0	Collision	26	
Ret	26	(New Zealand) Graham McRae	Iso-Marlboro-Ford	0	Throttle	28	
DNS	18	(United Kingdom) David Purley	March-Ford	0	Spun Off	16	

== See also ==
- List of red-flagged Formula One races

== Notes ==
- This was the Formula One World Championship debut for British drivers Roger Williamson and future Grand Prix winner John Watson, German driver and future Grand Prix winner Jochen Mass and for New Zealand driver Graham McRae.
- This was the 61st pole position for Lotus, breaking the old record set by Ferrari at the 1972 Italian Grand Prix.

== Championship standings after the race ==
Drivers' Championship standings

Pos	Driver	Points
1	(United Kingdom) Jackie Stewart	42
2	(Brazil) Emerson Fittipaldi	41
3	(France) François Cevert	33
4	(Sweden) Ronnie Peterson	25
5	(New Zealand) Denny Hulme	23

Constructors' Championship standings

	Pos	Constructor	Points
	1	(United Kingdom) Lotus-Ford	58 (62)
	2	(United Kingdom) Tyrrell-Ford	53 (57)
	3	(United Kingdom) McLaren-Ford	35
1	4	(United Kingdom) Brabham-Ford	12
1	5	(Italy) Ferrari	12

- Note: Only the top five positions are included for both sets of standings. Only the best 7 results from the first 8 races and the best 6 results from the last 7 races counted towards the Championship. Numbers without parentheses are Championship points; numbers in parentheses are total points scored.

Previous race: 1973 French Grand Prix	FIA Formula One World Championship; 1973 season	Next race: 1973 Dutch Grand Prix
Previous race: 1972 British Grand Prix	British Grand Prix	Next race: 1974 British Grand Prix
