= 1974 French Grand Prix =

- Dijon-Prenois Circuit

Race details
- Date: 7 July 1974
- Location: Dijon-Prenois, Dijon, France
- Course: Permanent racing facility
- Course length: 3.289 km (2.044 miles)
- Distance: 80 laps, 263.12 km (163.495 miles)

Pole position
Driver	(Austria) Niki Lauda	Ferrari
- Time: 0:58.79

Fastest lap
Driver	(South Africa) Jody Scheckter	Tyrrell-Ford
- Time: 1:00.00 on lap 10

Podium
First	(Sweden) Ronnie Peterson	Lotus-Ford
Second	(Austria) Niki Lauda	Ferrari
Third	(Switzerland) Clay Regazzoni	Ferrari

The 1974 French Grand Prix was a Formula One motor race held at Dijon-Prenois near Dijon, France on 7 July 1974. It was race 9 of 15 in both the 1974 World Championship of Drivers and the 1974 International Cup for Formula One Manufacturers.

The 80-lap race was won by Ronnie Peterson, driving a Lotus-Ford. Niki Lauda finished second in a Ferrari, having started from pole position, with teammate Clay Regazzoni third. Until the 2020 Sakhir Grand Prix, this was the only World Championship Grand Prix in which lap times of less than one minute were set, by 12 drivers during qualifying, including pole position starter Lauda.

== Qualifying ==
=== Qualifying classification ===
Pos.	Driver	Constructor	Time	Grid
1	(Austria) Niki Lauda	Ferrari	0:58.79	1
2	(Sweden) Ronnie Peterson	Lotus-Ford	0:59.08	2
3	(United Kingdom) Tom Pryce	Shadow-Ford	0:59.11	3
4	(Switzerland) Clay Regazzoni	Ferrari	0:59.13	4
5	(Brazil) Emerson Fittipaldi	McLaren-Ford	0:59.20	5
6	(United Kingdom) Mike Hailwood	McLaren-Ford	0:59.22	6
7	(South Africa) Jody Scheckter	Tyrrell-Ford	0:59.32	7
8	(Argentina) Carlos Reutemann	Brabham-Ford	0:59.36	8
9	(France) Patrick Depailler	Tyrrell-Ford	0:59.43	9
10	(United Kingdom) James Hunt	Hesketh-Ford	0:59.51	10
11	(New Zealand) Denny Hulme	McLaren-Ford	0:59.54	11
12	(France) Jean-Pierre Jarier	Shadow-Ford	0:59.59	12
13	(Belgium) Jacky Ickx	Lotus-Ford	1:00.00	13
14	(United Kingdom) John Watson	Brabham-Ford	1:00.02	14
15	(Italy) Arturo Merzario	Iso-Marlboro-Ford	1:00.16	15
16	(Italy) Vittorio Brambilla	March-Ford	1:00.26	16
17	(France) Jean-Pierre Beltoise	BRM	1:00.36	17
18	(West Germany) Jochen Mass	Surtees-Ford	1:00.48	18
19	(France) Henri Pescarolo	BRM	1:00.67	19
20	(United Kingdom) Guy Edwards	Lola-Ford	1:00.68	20
21	(United Kingdom) Graham Hill	Lola-Ford	1:00.73	21
22	(France) François Migault	BRM	1:00.86	22
23	(Australia) Vern Schuppan	Ensign-Ford	1:01.24	—
24	(Brazil) Carlos Pace	Brabham-Ford	1:01.35	—
25	(France) Jean-Pierre Jabouille	Iso-Marlboro-Ford	1:01.52	—
26	(West Germany) Hans-Joachim Stuck	March-Ford	1:01.60	—
27	(France) José Dolhem	Surtees-Ford	1:01.70	—
28	(Liechtenstein) Rikky von Opel	Brabham-Ford	1:01.79	—
29	(Finland) Leo Kinnunen	Surtees-Ford	1:03.15	—
30	(France) Gérard Larrousse	Brabham-Ford	1:03.27	—

*Positions with a pink background indicate drivers that failed to qualify

== Race ==
=== Race summary ===
To honor the 80th birthday of the ACF, a parade of vintage cars was organized with a selection of great drivers from the 20s and 30s up to the present day. The race itself was largely uneventful. Tom Pryce put in a superb performance to be 3rd on the grid behind Ronnie Peterson and Niki Lauda. However, he was slow off the start and was hit by Carlos Reutemann, ending his race. James Hunt and Henri Pescarolo were also taken out in the ensuing accident. Lauda led convincingly from Peterson and Clay Regazzoni with Emerson Fittipaldi up to 4th by lap 15. Lauda dropped back with handling problems on lap 16, and was passed by Peterson, who led to the flag. He was followed by Lauda and Regazzoni, who came home 3rd despite vibration problems. Regazzoni had been challenged strongly by Fittipaldi, but just as the McLaren driver was preparing to pass, Fittipaldi's engine exploded, ending his race. Jody Scheckter was fourth, less than a second behind Regazzoni.

=== Classification ===
Pos	No	Driver	Constructor	Laps	Time/Retired	Grid	Points
1	1	(Sweden) Ronnie Peterson	Lotus-Ford	80	1:21:55.02	2	9
2	12	(Austria) Niki Lauda	Ferrari	80	+ 20.36	1	6
3	11	(Switzerland) Clay Regazzoni	Ferrari	80	+ 27.84	4	4
4	3	(South Africa) Jody Scheckter	Tyrrell-Ford	80	+ 28.11	7	3
5	2	(Belgium) Jacky Ickx	Lotus-Ford	80	+ 37.54	13	2
6	6	(New Zealand) Denny Hulme	McLaren-Ford	80	+ 38.14	11	1
7	33	(United Kingdom) Mike Hailwood	McLaren-Ford	79	+ 1 Lap	6	
8	4	(France) Patrick Depailler	Tyrrell-Ford	79	+ 1 Lap	9	
9	20	(Italy) Arturo Merzario	Iso-Marlboro-Ford	79	+ 1 Lap	15	
10	14	(France) Jean-Pierre Beltoise	BRM	79	+ 1 Lap	17	
11	10	(Italy) Vittorio Brambilla	March-Ford	79	+ 1 Lap	16	
12	17	(France) Jean-Pierre Jarier	Shadow-Ford	79	+ 1 Lap	12	
13	26	(United Kingdom) Graham Hill	Lola-Ford	78	+ 2 Laps	21	
14	37	(France) François Migault	BRM	78	+ 2 Laps	22	
15	27	(United Kingdom) Guy Edwards	Lola-Ford	77	+ 3 Laps	20	
16	28	(United Kingdom) John Watson	Brabham-Ford	76	+ 4 Laps	14	
Ret	5	(Brazil) Emerson Fittipaldi	McLaren-Ford	27	Engine	5	
Ret	7	(Argentina) Carlos Reutemann	Brabham-Ford	24	Handling	8	
Ret	19	(West Germany) Jochen Mass	Surtees-Ford	4	Clutch	18	
Ret	16	(United Kingdom) Tom Pryce	Shadow-Ford	1	Collision	3	
Ret	15	(France) Henri Pescarolo	BRM	1	Clutch	19	
Ret	24	(United Kingdom) James Hunt	Hesketh-Ford	0	Collision	10	
DNQ	22	(Australia) Vern Schuppan	Ensign-Ford				
DNQ	8	(Liechtenstein) Rikky von Opel	Brabham-Ford				
DNQ	34	(Brazil) Carlos Pace	Brabham-Ford				
DNQ	21	(France) Jean-Pierre Jabouille	Iso-Marlboro-Ford				
DNQ	9	(West Germany) Hans Joachim Stuck	March-Ford				
DNQ	18	(France) José Dolhem	Surtees-Ford				
DNQ	23	(Finland) Leo Kinnunen	Surtees-Ford				
DNQ	43	(France) Gérard Larrousse	Brabham-Ford				

== Notes ==
- This was the Formula One World Championship debut for French drivers José Dolhem and future Grand Prix winner Jean-Pierre Jabouille.
- This was the 100th Grand Prix start for a German driver. In those 100 races, German drivers had won 2 Grands Prix, achieved 10 podium finishes, 1 pole position and 2 fastest laps.
- This was the first fastest lap set by a South African driver.

== Championship standings after the race ==
Drivers' Championship standings

	Pos	Driver	Points
1	1	(Austria) Niki Lauda	36
1	2	(Switzerland) Clay Regazzoni	32
2	3	(Brazil) Emerson Fittipaldi	31
	4	(South Africa) Jody Scheckter	26
3	5	(Sweden) Ronnie Peterson	19

Constructors' Championship standings

	Pos	Constructor	Points
1	1	(Italy) Ferrari	45
1	2	(United Kingdom) McLaren-Ford	43 (45)
	3	(United Kingdom) Tyrrell-Ford	30
	4	(United Kingdom) Lotus-Ford	22
	5	(United Kingdom) Brabham-Ford	10

- Note: Only the top five positions are included for both sets of standings. Only the best 7 results from the first 8 races and the best 6 results from the last 7 races counted towards the Championship. Numbers without parentheses are Championship points; numbers in parentheses are total points scored.

Previous race: 1974 Dutch Grand Prix	FIA Formula One World Championship; 1974 season	Next race: 1974 British Grand Prix
Previous race: 1973 French Grand Prix	French Grand Prix	Next race: 1975 French Grand Prix
