= 1974 Dutch Grand Prix =

Race details
- Date: 23 June 1974
- Official name: XXI Grand Prix Zandvoort
- Location: Zandvoort, Netherlands
- Course: Permanent racing facility
- Course length: 4.226 km (2.626 miles)

Pole position
| Driver | (Austria) Niki Lauda | Ferrari |
- Time: 1:18.31

Fastest lap
| Driver | (Sweden) Ronnie Peterson | Lotus-Ford |
- Time: 1:21.44 on lap 63

Podium
| First | (Austria) Niki Lauda | Ferrari |
| Second | (Switzerland) Clay Regazzoni | Ferrari |
| Third | (Brazil) Emerson Fittipaldi | McLaren-Ford |

The 1974 Dutch Grand Prix was a Formula One motor race held at Circuit Zandvoort on 23 June 1974. It was race 8 of 15 in both the 1974 World Championship of Drivers and the 1974 International Cup for Formula One Manufacturers.

== Classification ==
=== Qualifying ===
| Pos. | Driver | Constructor | Time/Gap |
|---|---|---|---|
| 1 | (Austria) Niki Lauda | Ferrari | 1:18.31 |
| 2 | (Switzerland) Clay Regazzoni | Ferrari | +0.60 |
| 3 | (Brazil) Emerson Fittipaldi | McLaren–Ford | +1.25 |
| 4 | (United Kingdom) Mike Hailwood | McLaren–Ford | +1.37 |
| 5 | (South Africa) Jody Scheckter | Tyrrell–Ford | +1.60 |
| 6 | (United Kingdom) James Hunt | Hesketh–Ford | +1.64 |
| 7 | (France) Jean-Pierre Jarier | Shadow–Ford | +1.76 |
| 8 | (France) Patrick Depailler | Tyrrell–Ford | +1.83 |
| 9 | (New Zealand) Denny Hulme | McLaren–Ford | +1.84 |
| 10 | (Sweden) Ronnie Peterson | Lotus–Ford | +1.91 |
| 11 | (United Kingdom) Tom Pryce | Shadow–Ford | +2.13 |
| 12 | (Argentina) Carlos Reutemann | Brabham–Ford | +2.14 |
| 13 | (United Kingdom) John Watson | Brabham–Ford | +2.47 |
| 14 | (United Kingdom) Guy Edwards | Lola–Ford | +2.69 |
| 15 | (Italy) Vittorio Brambilla | March–Ford | +2.70 |
| 16 | (France) Jean-Pierre Beltoise | BRM | +2.73 |
| 17 | (Australia) Vern Schuppan | Ensign–Ford | +2.83 |
| 18 | (Belgium) Jacky Ickx | Lotus–Ford | +2.90 |
| 19 | (United Kingdom) Graham Hill | Lola–Ford | +2.91 |
| 20 | (West Germany) Jochen Mass | Surtees–Ford | +2.96 |
| 21 | (Italy) Arturo Merzario | FWRC–Ford | +3.21 |
| 22 | (West Germany) Hans-Joachim Stuck | March–Ford | +3.22 |
| 23 | (Liechtenstein) Rikky von Opel | Brabham–Ford | +3.25 |
| 24 | (France) Henri Pescarolo | BRM | +3.53 |
| 25 | (France) François Migault | BRM | +4.03 |
| 26 | (Australia) Tim Schenken | Trojan–Ford | +4.34 |
| 27 | (Netherlands) Gijs van Lennep | FWRC–Ford | +4.37 |

*Positions with a pink background indicate drivers that failed to qualify

=== Race ===
| Pos | No | Driver | Constructor | Laps | Time/Retired | Grid | Points |
|---|---|---|---|---|---|---|---|
| 1 | 12 | (Austria) Niki Lauda | Ferrari | 75 | 1:43:00.35 | 1 | 9 |
| 2 | 11 | (Switzerland) Clay Regazzoni | Ferrari | 75 | + 8.25 | 2 | 6 |
| 3 | 5 | (Brazil) Emerson Fittipaldi | McLaren-Ford | 75 | + 30.27 | 3 | 4 |
| 4 | 33 | (United Kingdom) Mike Hailwood | McLaren-Ford | 75 | + 31.29 | 4 | 3 |
| 5 | 3 | (South Africa) Jody Scheckter | Tyrrell-Ford | 75 | + 34.28 | 5 | 2 |
| 6 | 4 | (France) Patrick Depailler | Tyrrell-Ford | 75 | + 51.52 | 8 | 1 |
| 7 | 28 | (United Kingdom) John Watson | Brabham-Ford | 75 | + 1:13.95 | 13 | |
| 8 | 1 | (Sweden) Ronnie Peterson | Lotus-Ford | 73 | + 2 Laps | 10 | |
| 9 | 8 | (Liechtenstein) Rikky von Opel | Brabham-Ford | 73 | + 2 Laps | 23 | |
| 10 | 10 | (Italy) Vittorio Brambilla | March-Ford | 72 | + 3 Laps | 15 | |
| 11 | 2 | (Belgium) Jacky Ickx | Lotus-Ford | 71 | + 4 Laps | 18 | |
| 12 | 7 | (Argentina) Carlos Reutemann | Brabham-Ford | 71 | + 4 Laps | 12 | |
| DSQ | 22 | (Australia) Vern Schuppan | Ensign-Ford | 69 | Illegal Tyre Change | 17 | |
| Ret | 6 | (New Zealand) Denny Hulme | McLaren-Ford | 65 | Ignition | 9 | |
| Ret | 37 | (France) François Migault | BRM | 60 | Gearbox | 25 | |
| Ret | 20 | (Italy) Arturo Merzario | Iso-Marlboro-Ford | 54 | Gearbox | 21 | |
| Ret | 27 | (United Kingdom) Guy Edwards | Lola-Ford | 36 | Fuel System | 14 | |
| Ret | 17 | (France) Jean-Pierre Jarier | Shadow-Ford | 28 | Clutch | 7 | |
| Ret | 14 | (France) Jean-Pierre Beltoise | BRM | 18 | Gearbox | 16 | |
| Ret | 26 | (United Kingdom) Graham Hill | Lola-Ford | 16 | Gearbox | 19 | |
| Ret | 15 | (France) Henri Pescarolo | BRM | 15 | Handling | 24 | |
| Ret | 19 | (West Germany) Jochen Mass | Surtees-Ford | 8 | Transmission | 20 | |
| Ret | 24 | (United Kingdom) James Hunt | Hesketh-Ford | 2 | Collision | 6 | |
| Ret | 16 | (United Kingdom) Tom Pryce | Shadow-Ford | 0 | Collision | 11 | |
| Ret | 9 | (West Germany) Hans-Joachim Stuck | March-Ford | 0 | Accident | 22 | |
| DNQ | 23 | (Australia) Tim Schenken | Trojan-Ford | | | | |
| DNQ | 21 | (Netherlands) Gijs van Lennep | Iso-Marlboro-Ford | | | | |

== Notes ==
- This was the 10th Grand Prix start for a driver from Liechtenstein.
- This race marked the 25th podium finish for a Brazilian driver.
- This was the 50th fastest lap set by a Lotus.
- This was the 100th Grand Prix start for a Ford-powered car. In those 100 races, Ford-powered cars had won 72 Grands Prix, achieved 191 podium finishes, 63 pole positions, 63 fastest laps, 9 Grand Slams and won 6 Driver's and 6 Constructor's World Championships.

== Championship standings after the race ==
Drivers' Championship standings

| | Pos | Driver | Points |
|---|---|---|---|
| | 1 | (Brazil) Emerson Fittipaldi | 31 |
| 1 | 2 | (Austria) Niki Lauda | 30 |
| 1 | 3 | (Switzerland) Clay Regazzoni | 28 |
| | 4 | (South Africa) Jody Scheckter | 23 |
| 5 | 5 | (United Kingdom) Mike Hailwood | 12 |

Constructors' Championship standings

| Pos | Constructor | Points |
|---|---|---|
| 1 | (United Kingdom) McLaren-Ford | 42 (44) |
| 2 | (Italy) Ferrari | 39 |
| 3 | (United Kingdom) Tyrrell-Ford | 27 |
| 4 | (United Kingdom) Lotus-Ford | 13 |
| 5 | (United Kingdom) Brabham-Ford | 10 |

- Note: Only the top five positions are included for both sets of standings. Only the best 7 results from the first 8 races and the best 6 results from the last 7 races counted towards the Championship. Numbers without parentheses are Championship points; numbers in parentheses are total points scored.

| Previous race: 1974 Swedish Grand Prix | FIA Formula One World Championship; 1974 season | Next race: 1974 French Grand Prix |
| Previous race: 1973 Dutch Grand Prix | Dutch Grand Prix | Next race: 1975 Dutch Grand Prix |
