= 1973 French Grand Prix =

8th round of the 1973 Formula One Championship

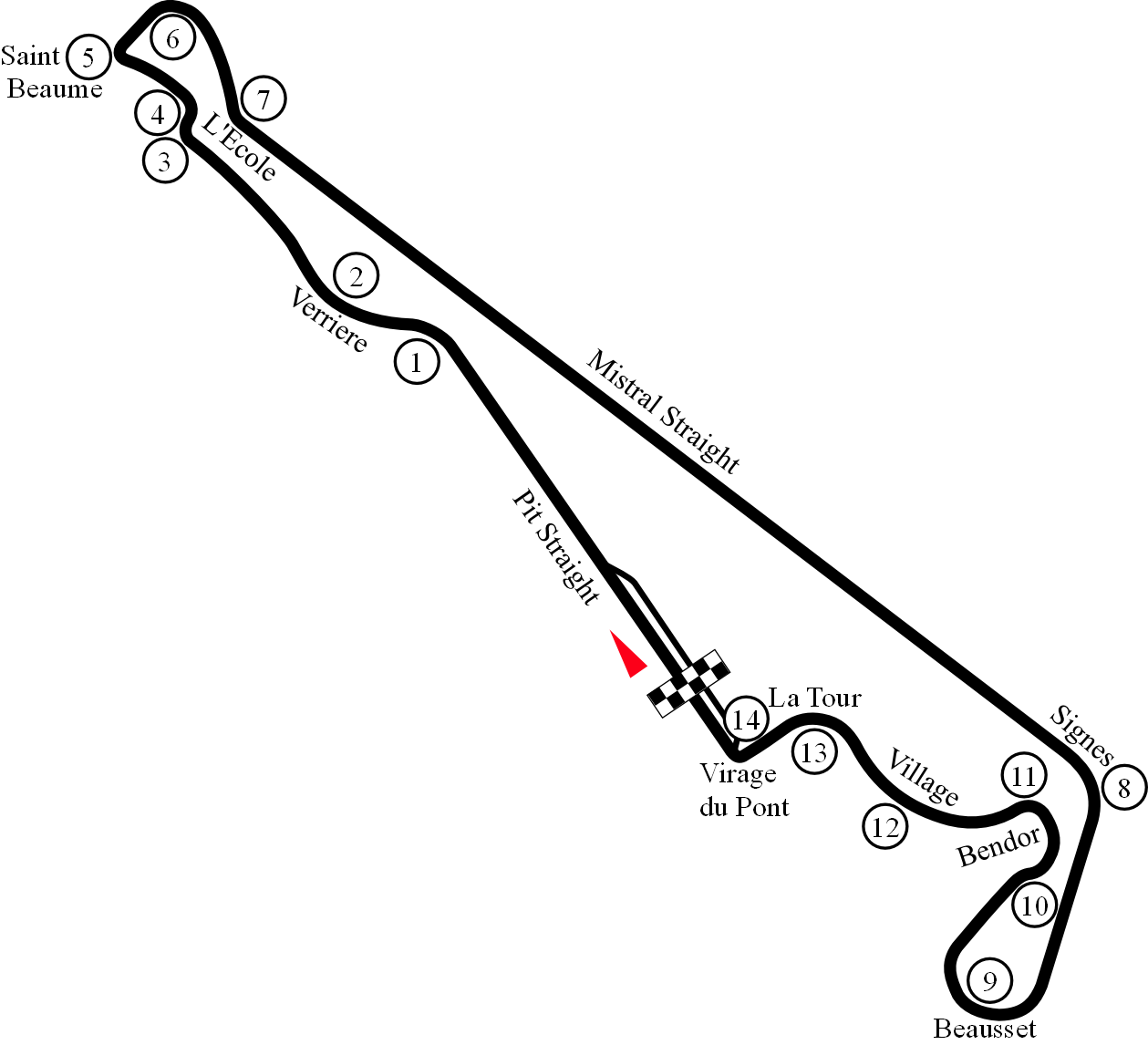

Race details
- Date: 1 July 1973
- Location: Circuit Paul Ricard, Le Castellet, France
- Course: Permanent racing facility
- Course length: 5.809 km (3.610 miles)
- Distance: 54 laps, 313.686 km (194.915 miles)
- Weather: Sunny and warm

Pole position
Driver	(United Kingdom) Jackie Stewart	Tyrrell-Ford
- Time: 1:48.37

Fastest lap
Driver	(New Zealand) Denny Hulme	McLaren-Ford
- Time: 1:50.99 on lap 52

Podium
First	(Sweden) Ronnie Peterson	Lotus-Ford
Second	(France) François Cevert	Tyrrell-Ford
Third	(Argentina) Carlos Reutemann	Brabham-Ford

The 1973 French Grand Prix was a Formula One motor race held at the Paul Ricard Circuit on 1 July 1973. It was race 8 of 15 in both the 1973 World Championship of Drivers and the 1973 International Cup for Formula One Manufacturers. It was the first victory for two-time World Championship runner-up Ronnie Peterson.

== Qualifying ==
=== Qualifying classification ===
Pos.	Driver	Constructor	Time	No
1	Jackie Stewart	Tyrrell-Ford	1:48.37	1
2	Jody Scheckter	McLaren-Ford	1:49.18	2
3	Emerson Fittipaldi	Lotus-Ford	1:49.36	3
4	François Cevert	Tyrrell-Ford	1:49.39	4
5	Ronnie Peterson	Lotus-Ford	1:49.45	5
6	Denis Hulme	McLaren-Ford	1:49.68	6
7	Jean-Pierre Jarier	March-Ford	1:50.69	7
8	Carlos Reutemann	Brabham-Ford	1:50.75	8
9	Clay Regazzoni	BRM	1:50.99	9
10	Arturo Merzario	Ferrari	1:51.17	10
11	Mike Hailwood	Surtees-Ford	1:51.17	11
12	Jacky Ickx	Ferrari	1:51.44	12
13	Andrea de Adamich	Brabham-Ford	1:51.53	13
14	James Hunt	March-Ford	1:51.63	14
15	Jean-Pierre Beltoise	BRM	1:51.67	15
16	Graham Hill	Shadow-Ford	1:51.70	16
17	Niki Lauda	BRM	1:51.78	17
18	Carlos Pace	Surtees-Ford	1:51.88	18
19	Wilson Fittipaldi	Brabham-Ford	1:52.07	19
20	George Follmer	Shadow-Ford	1:52.30	20
21	Jackie Oliver	Shadow-Ford	1:52.94	21
22	Reine Wisell	March-Ford	1:53.20	22
23	Henri Pescarolo	Iso-Ford	1:53.56	23
24	Howden Ganley	Iso-Ford	1:53.87	24
25	Rikky von Opel	Ensign-Ford	1:55.55	25

== Race ==
=== Controversy ===
This race was notable for a collision involving Jody Scheckter and Emerson Fittipaldi. Scheckter, who was given an opportunity to drive a factory McLaren for this event was leading from the start in just his third Formula One race. On lap 41, Fittipaldi had closed and attempted to pass the South African, but Scheckter closed the door and they made heavy contact, forcing Emerson into retirement. Scheckter continued but retired shortly afterwards with suspension damage. Fittipaldi ran to the McLaren pits, eventually resulting in fierce words between the two drivers. Scheckter claimed years later that Fittipaldi had called him a 'young hooligan' for his role in the incident. At the following race, the 1973 British Grand Prix, Scheckter triggered a multiple collision at the end of the first lap, causing many cars to retire. Many drivers wanted him banned from the sport after the race, but McLaren instead decided to put him on the sidelines for a number of races.

=== Results ===
Meanwhile, after so many promising races turned to nothing, Swedish driver Ronnie Peterson finally celebrated victory for the first time in his career, driving a Lotus. Tyrrell driver François Cevert finished in second place, whilst Carlos Reutemann achieved the first podium of his career, finishing third in a Brabham. He was followed by Jackie Stewart's Tyrrell in fourth, Jacky Ickx's Ferrari in fifth, and James Hunt scoring the first point of his F1 career driving a Hesketh-owned March.

== Classification ==
Pos	No	Driver	Constructor	Laps	Time/Retired	Grid	Points
1	2	(Sweden) Ronnie Peterson	Lotus-Ford	54	1:41:36.52	5	9
2	6	(France) François Cevert	Tyrrell-Ford	54	+ 40.92	4	6
3	10	(Argentina) Carlos Reutemann	Brabham-Ford	54	+ 46.48	8	4
4	5	(United Kingdom) Jackie Stewart	Tyrrell-Ford	54	+ 46.93	1	3
5	3	(Belgium) Jacky Ickx	Ferrari	54	+ 48.90	12	2
6	27	(United Kingdom) James Hunt	March-Ford	54	+ 1:22.54	14	1
7	4	(Italy) Arturo Merzario	Ferrari	54	+ 1:29.19	10	
8	7	(New Zealand) Denny Hulme	McLaren-Ford	54	+ 1:29.53	6	
9	21	(Austria) Niki Lauda	BRM	54	+ 1:45.76	17	
10	12	(United Kingdom) Graham Hill	Shadow-Ford	53	+ 1 Lap	16	
11	20	(France) Jean-Pierre Beltoise	BRM	53	+ 1 Lap	15	
12	19	(Switzerland) Clay Regazzoni	BRM	53	+ 1 Lap	9	
13	24	(Brazil) Carlos Pace	Surtees-Ford	51	+ 3 Laps	18	
14	25	(New Zealand) Howden Ganley	Iso-Marlboro-Ford	51	+ 3 Laps	24	
15	29	(Liechtenstein) Rikky von Opel	Ensign-Ford	51	+ 3 Laps	25	
16	11	(Brazil) Wilson Fittipaldi	Brabham-Ford	50	+ 4 Laps	19	
Ret	8	(South Africa) Jody Scheckter	McLaren-Ford	43	Collision damage	2	
Ret	1	(Brazil) Emerson Fittipaldi	Lotus-Ford	41	Collision	3	
Ret	23	(United Kingdom) Mike Hailwood	Surtees-Ford	29	Oil Leak	11	
Ret	9	(Italy) Andrea de Adamich	Brabham-Ford	28	Halfshaft	13	
Ret	15	(Sweden) Reine Wisell	March-Ford	20	Overheating	22	
Ret	16	(United States) George Follmer	Shadow-Ford	16	Fuel system	20	
Ret	26	(France) Henri Pescarolo	Iso-Marlboro-Ford	16	Overheating	23	
Ret	14	(France) Jean-Pierre Jarier	March-Ford	7	Halfshaft	7	
Ret	17	(United Kingdom) Jackie Oliver	Shadow-Ford	0	Clutch	21	

== Notes ==
- This was the Formula One World Championship debut for Liechtensteiner driver Rikky von Opel. He was the first driver to drive for the microstate.
- This was the 5th fastest lap set by McLaren.

== Championship standings after the race ==
Drivers' Championship standings

	Pos	Driver	Points
1	1	(United Kingdom) Jackie Stewart	42
1	2	(Brazil) Emerson Fittipaldi	41
	3	(France) François Cevert	31
2	4	(Sweden) Ronnie Peterson	19
1	5	(New Zealand) Denny Hulme	19

Constructors' Championship standings

	Pos	Constructor	Points
1	1	(United Kingdom) Lotus-Ford	52 (56)
1	2	(United Kingdom) Tyrrell-Ford	51 (55)
	3	(United Kingdom) McLaren-Ford	26
	4	(Italy) Ferrari	12
	5	(United Kingdom) Brabham-Ford	11

- Note: Only the top five positions are included for both sets of standings. Only the best 7 results from the first 8 races and the best 6 results from the last 7 races counted towards the Championship. Numbers without parentheses are Championship points; numbers in parentheses are total points scored.

Previous race: 1973 Swedish Grand Prix	FIA Formula One World Championship; 1973 season	Next race: 1973 British Grand Prix
Previous race: 1972 French Grand Prix	French Grand Prix	Next race: 1974 French Grand Prix
