= 1973 Dutch Grand Prix =

Race details
- Date: 29 July 1973
- Official name: XX Grand Prix Zandvoort
- Location: Circuit Zandvoort, Zandvoort, Netherlands
- Course: Permanent racing facility
- Course length: 4.226 km (2.626 miles)
- Distance: 72 laps, 304.272 km (189.072 miles)
- Weather: Dry

Pole position
| Driver | (Sweden) Ronnie Peterson | Lotus-Ford |
- Time: 1:19.47

Fastest lap
| Driver | (Sweden) Ronnie Peterson | Lotus-Ford |
- Time: 1:20.31

Podium
| First | (United Kingdom) Jackie Stewart | Tyrrell-Ford |
| Second | (France) François Cevert | Tyrrell-Ford |
| Third | (United Kingdom) James Hunt | March-Ford |

The 1973 Dutch Grand Prix was a Formula One motor race held at Zandvoort on 29 July 1973. It was race 10 of 15 in both the 1973 World Championship of Drivers and the 1973 International Cup for Formula One Manufacturers. Zandvoort returned to the Formula One calendar following a year's absence for extensive safety upgrades to the race track including new asphalt, new barriers and a new race control tower. Jackie Stewart won the race, this Grand Prix being fourth of five wins for Stewart during the 1973 Formula One season, and he became the most successful Formula One driver of all time with his 26th Grand Prix victory, surpassing Jim Clark's record of 25 victories. Stewart's friend and future world champion James Hunt scored his first podium finish.

Driver Roger Williamson was killed in the race; this was the first of two driver fatalities in the 1973 season. François Cevert, who took the podium in second place at this race, would later perish during qualifying for the 1973 United States Grand Prix.

== Qualifying ==
| Pos | No | Driver | Constructor | Lap | Gap |
|---|---|---|---|---|---|
| 1 | 2 | (Sweden) Ronnie Peterson | Lotus-Ford | 1:19.47 | — |
| 2 | 5 | (United Kingdom) Jackie Stewart | Tyrrell-Ford | 1:19.97 | +0.50 |
| 3 | 6 | (France) François Cevert | Tyrrell-Ford | 1:20.12 | +0.65 |
| 4 | 7 | (New Zealand) Denny Hulme | McLaren-Ford | 1:20.31 | +0.84 |
| 5 | 10 | (Argentina) Carlos Reutemann | Brabham-Ford | 1:20.59 | +1.12 |
| 6 | 8 | (United States) Peter Revson | McLaren-Ford | 1:20.60 | +1.13 |
| 7 | 27 | (United Kingdom) James Hunt | March-Ford | 1:20.70 | +1.23 |
| 8 | 24 | (Brazil) Carlos Pace | Surtees-Ford | 1:21.02 | +1.55 |
| 9 | 20 | (France) Jean-Pierre Beltoise | BRM | 1:21.14 | +1.67 |
| 10 | 17 | (United Kingdom) Jackie Oliver | Shadow-Ford | 1:21.23 | +1.76 |
| 11 | 21 | (Austria) Niki Lauda | BRM | 1:21.43 | +1.96 |
| 12 | 19 | (Switzerland) Clay Regazzoni | BRM | 1:21.56 | +2.09 |
| 13 | 11 | (Brazil) Wilson Fittipaldi | Brabham-Ford | 1:21.82 | +2.35 |
| 14 | 28 | (Liechtenstein) Rikky von Opel | Ensign-Ford | 1:22.01 | +2.54 |
| 15 | 25 | (New Zealand) Howden Ganley | Iso-Marlboro-Ford | 1:22.10 | +2.63 |
| 16 | 1 | (Brazil) Emerson Fittipaldi | Lotus-Ford | 1:22.24 | +2.77 |
| 17 | 12 | (United Kingdom) Graham Hill | Shadow-Ford | 1:22.50 | +3.03 |
| 18 | 14 | (United Kingdom) Roger Williamson | March-Ford | 1:22.72 | +3.25 |
| 19 | 22 | (New Zealand) Chris Amon | Tecno | 1:22.73 | +3.26 |
| 20 | 26 | (Netherlands) Gijs van Lennep | Iso-Marlboro-Ford | 1:22.95 | +3.48 |
| 21 | 18 | (United Kingdom) David Purley | March-Ford | 1:23.09 | +3.62 |
| 22 | 16 | (United States) George Follmer | Shadow-Ford | 1:24.14 | +3.67 |
| 23 | 15 | (United Kingdom) Mike Beuttler | March-Ford | 1:24.45 | +3.98 |
| 24 | 23 | (United Kingdom) Mike Hailwood | Surtees-Ford | 1:32.33 | +11.86 |

== Race ==
=== Death of Roger Williamson ===
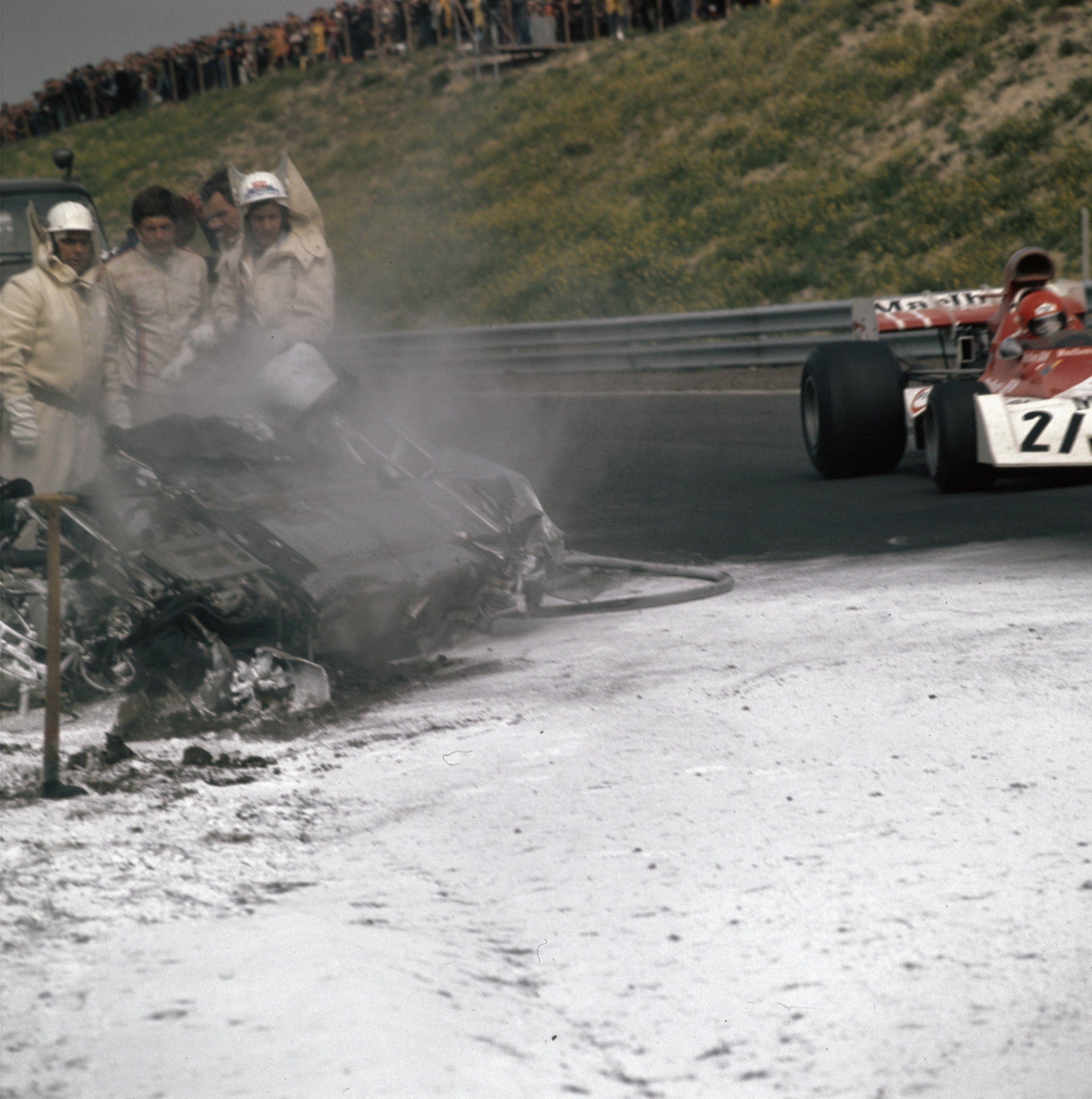
The burned wreckage of Roger Williamson's March 731.

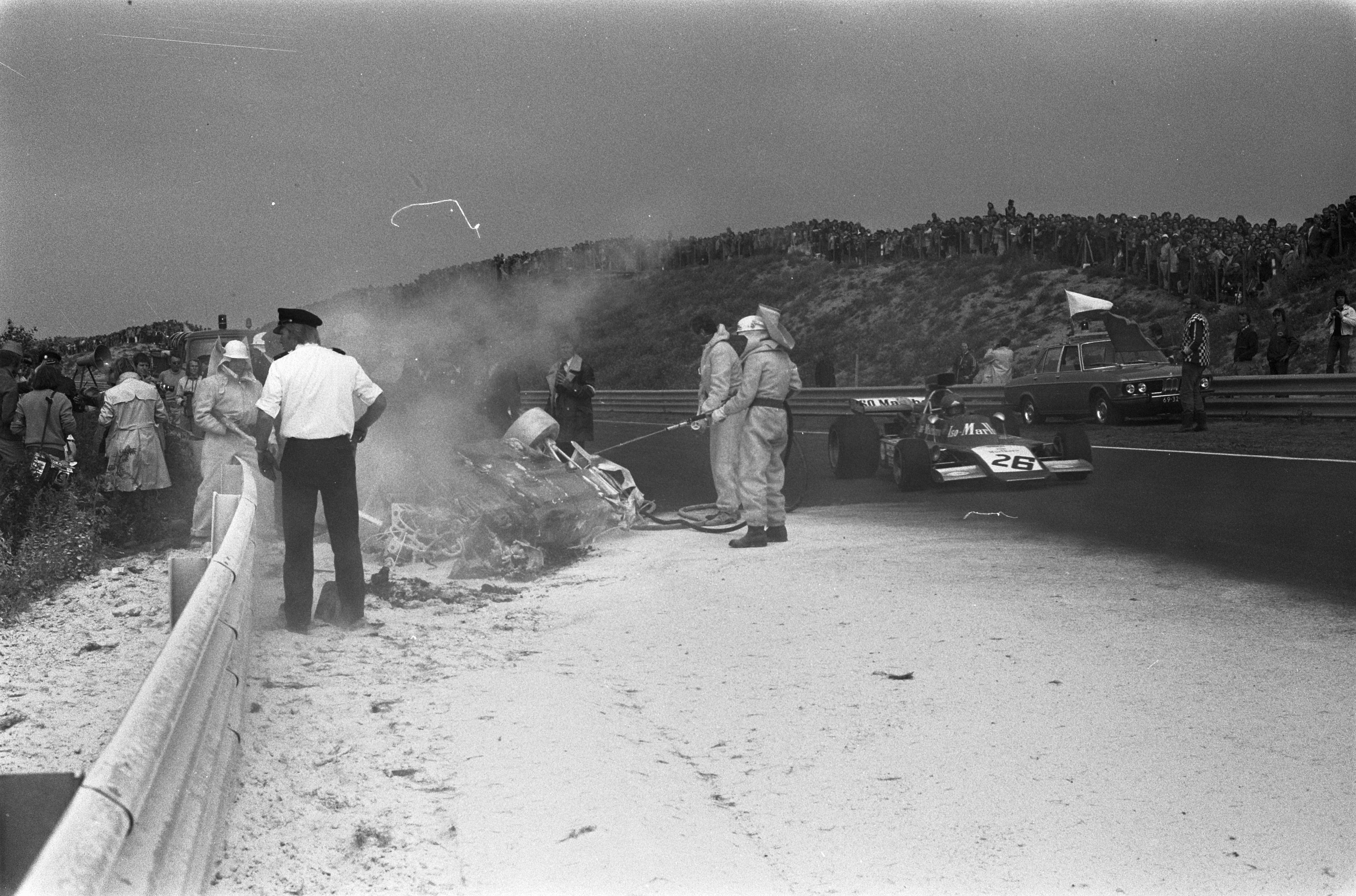
Williamson's fatal accident.

On the eighth lap of the race through the high speed esses near the Tunnel Oost (East Tunnel) right-hand corner, a suspected tyre failure caused Williamson's car to pitch into the barriers at high speed, and be catapulted 300 yards (275 m) across the track, eventually coming to rest upside down against the barriers on the other side. The petrol tank had ignited whilst being scraped along the track, and the car caught fire. Williamson had not been seriously injured by the impact, but was trapped in the car. The race was not stopped and continued with a local yellow at the scene, a fact which would become significant over the next few minutes.

Fellow driver David Purley, who witnessed Williamson's impact, almost immediately pulled his car over on the opposite side of the track, then ran across the live racetrack to assist him. Williamson was heard shouting to Purley to get him out of the car as Purley tried in vain to turn the car upright. There appeared to have been ample time to right the car and pull Williamson out, but as desperately as he tried, Purley was unable to do it by himself, and the marshals, who were not wearing flame retardant overalls, refrained from assisting him due to the intense heat.

Race control assumed that it was Purley's car that had crashed and that the driver had escaped unharmed. Many drivers who saw Purley waving them down to stop later claimed that they assumed Purley to be trying to put a fire out from his own car, having safely exited it, and thus did not know that a second driver had been involved. As a result, the race continued at full pace while Purley desperately tried to save the life of Williamson, unbeknownst to the marshals and the drivers.

There was only a single fire extinguisher in the area, and it was not enough to put out the fire. With the car still burning upside-down, the situation became hopeless, and the distraught Purley was led away by a marshal. As can be seen in the race footage, some spectators breached the safety fences in order to assist Williamson, but were likewise unable to get close to the upturned car due to the heat.

With the race still on, it took some eight minutes for a fire truck to completely travel around the circuit with the flow of race traffic. By the time the car was eventually righted, and the fire extinguished, Williamson had died of asphyxiation. A blanket was thrown over the burnt-out wreck with Williamson still inside, and the race carried on.

Purley was awarded the George Medal for his brave actions in trying to save his fellow sportsman. Williamson's remains were later cremated and his ashes transferred to an undisclosed location.

In an otherwise uneventful race, Jackie Stewart won his 26th career Grand Prix and broke Jim Clark's 5-year-old record of the most career Grand Prix victories. The starting grid of this race was set up in 3-2-3-2-3 formation, making this Grand Prix the last race with the starting grid having been formed of more than two columns of cars.

=== Classification ===
| Pos | No | Driver | Constructor | Laps | Time/Retired | Grid | Points |
|---|---|---|---|---|---|---|---|
| 1 | 5 | (United Kingdom) Jackie Stewart | Tyrrell-Ford | 72 | 1:39:12.45 | 2 | 9 |
| 2 | 6 | (France) François Cevert | Tyrrell-Ford | 72 | + 15.83 | 3 | 6 |
| 3 | 27 | (United Kingdom) James Hunt | March-Ford | 72 | + 1:03.01 | 7 | 4 |
| 4 | 8 | (United States) Peter Revson | McLaren-Ford | 72 | + 1:09.13 | 6 | 3 |
| 5 | 20 | (France) Jean-Pierre Beltoise | BRM | 72 | + 1:13.37 | 9 | 2 |
| 6 | 26 | (Netherlands) Gijs van Lennep | Iso-Marlboro-Ford | 70 | + 2 laps | 20 | 1 |
| 7 | 24 | (Brazil) Carlos Pace | Surtees-Ford | 69 | + 3 laps | 8 | |
| 8 | 19 | (Switzerland) Clay Regazzoni | BRM | 68 | + 4 laps | 12 | |
| 9 | 25 | (New Zealand) Howden Ganley | Iso-Marlboro-Ford | 68 | + 4 laps | 15 | |
| 10 | 16 | (United States) George Follmer | Shadow-Ford | 67 | + 5 laps | 22 | |
| 11 | 2 | (Sweden) Ronnie Peterson | Lotus-Ford | 66 | Engine | 1 | |
| NC | 12 | (United Kingdom) Graham Hill | Shadow-Ford | 56 | + 16 laps | 17 | |
| Ret | 21 | (Austria) Niki Lauda | BRM | 52 | Fuel pump | 11 | |
| Ret | 23 | (United Kingdom) Mike Hailwood | Surtees-Ford | 52 | Electrical | 24 | |
| Ret | 7 | (New Zealand) Denny Hulme | McLaren-Ford | 31 | Engine | 4 | |
| Ret | 11 | (Brazil) Wilson Fittipaldi | Brabham-Ford | 27 | Accident | 13 | |
| Ret | 22 | (New Zealand) Chris Amon | Tecno | 22 | Fuel system | 19 | |
| Ret | 10 | (Argentina) Carlos Reutemann | Brabham-Ford | 9 | Tyre | 5 | |
| Ret | 18 | (United Kingdom) David Purley | March-Ford | 8 | Withdrew (Williamson's Fatal accident) | 21 | |
| Ret | 14 | (United Kingdom) Roger Williamson | March-Ford | 7 | Fatal accident | 18 | |
| Ret | 1 | (Brazil) Emerson Fittipaldi | Lotus-Ford | 2 | Physical | 16 | |
| Ret | 15 | (United Kingdom) Mike Beuttler | March-Ford | 2 | Electrical | 23 | |
| Ret | 17 | (United Kingdom) Jackie Oliver | Shadow-Ford | 1 | Accident | 10 | |
| DNS | 28 | (Liechtenstein) Rikky von Opel | Ensign-Ford | 0 | Non starter | 14 | |

== Notes ==
- This was Jackie Stewart's 26th Grand Prix win, thereby breaking the record set by Jim Clark at the 1968 South African Grand Prix. Coincidentally, it was also the 100th Grand Prix win for a British driver.
- This was the 10th Grand Prix start for Italian constructor Iso-Marlboro, entered by Frank Williams.
- This was the 5th win of a Dutch Grand Prix by a Ford-powered car, breaking the old record set by Coventry Climax at the 1965 Dutch Grand Prix.
- This was the 75th consecutive time a Ford-powered car had finished in the top #10. This broke the record of the longest streak of top #10-finishes set by Coventry Climax between the 1958 Argentine Grand Prix and the 1965 Mexican Grand Prix.

== Championship standings after the race ==
Drivers' Championship standings

| | Pos | Driver | Points |
|---|---|---|---|
| | 1 | (United Kingdom) **Jackie Stewart*** | 51 |
| | 2 | (Brazil) **Emerson Fittipaldi*** | 41 |
| | 3 | (France) **François Cevert*** | 39 |
| | 4 | (Sweden) **Ronnie Peterson*** | 25 |
| 1 | 5 | (United States) **Peter Revson*** | 23 |

Constructors' Championship standings

| | Pos | Constructor | Points |
|---|---|---|---|
| 1 | 1 | (United Kingdom) **Tyrrell-Ford*** | 62 (66) |
| 1 | 2 | (United Kingdom) **Lotus-Ford*** | 58 (62) |
| | 3 | (United Kingdom) **McLaren-Ford*** | 38 |
| | 4 | (United Kingdom) Brabham-Ford | 12 |
| | 5 | (Italy) Ferrari | 12 |

- Note: Only the top five positions are included for both sets of standings. Only the best 7 results from the first 8 races and the best 6 results from the last 7 races counted towards the Championship. Numbers without parentheses are Championship points; numbers in parentheses are total points scored.
- Competitors in bold and marked with an asterisk still had a theoretical chance of becoming World Champion.

| Previous race: 1973 British Grand Prix | FIA Formula One World Championship; 1973 season | Next race: 1973 German Grand Prix |
| Previous race: 1971 Dutch Grand Prix | Dutch Grand Prix | Next race: 1974 Dutch Grand Prix |
