= Rikky von Opel =

Racing driver (born 1947)

- Born: Frederick von Opel; 14 October 1947 (age 79); New York City, U.S.
- Parent: Fritz von Opel (father)
- Relatives: Wilhelm von Opel (grandfather); Sophie Opel (grandmother); Adam Opel (great-grandfather); Carl von Opel (great-uncle); Gunter Sachs (cousin)

Formula One World Championship career
- Nationality: (Liechtenstein) Liechtensteiner
- Active years: 1973–1974
- Team(s): Ensign, Brabham
- Entries: 14 (10 starts)
- Championships: 0
- Wins: 0
- Podiums: 0
- Career points: 0
- Pole positions: 0
- Fastest laps: 0
- First entry: 1973 French Grand Prix
- Last entry: 1974 French Grand Prix

Frederick "Rikky" von Opel (born 14 October 1947) is a former racing driver, who competed under the Liechtenstein flag in Formula One from 1973 to 1974. Von Opel remains the only driver to represent Liechtenstein in Formula One.

Born in New York City and raised in St. Moritz, von Opel was born into the noble Opel family as the son of Fritz von Opel and the great-grandson of Adam Opel, founder of Opel. He won the Lombard North British Formula 3 Championship in 1972. Von Opel participated in 14 Formula One Grands Prix for Ensign and Brabham, debuting with the former at the 1973 French Grand Prix. He finished a career-best ninth at the Swedish and Dutch Grands Prix in 1974 with Brabham, driving the Brabham BT44.

Upon retiring from motor racing, von Opel moved to a Buddhist monastery in Thailand, becoming a monk.

== Racing career ==
Von Opel started out racing in Formula Ford in 1970, under the pseudonym "Antonio Branco". After his year in Formula Ford, he moved on to Formula 3, where he competed for two years. He raced a Lotus 69 in 1971 in the BRSCC Shell British Formula 3 series (six starts, one pole position, eight points), but changed over to Ensign Racing in 1972 and followed the team into Formula One. He won the 1972 Lombard North Formula 3 championship, one of three concurrent regional championships (along with the John Player, and Forward Trust) in the United Kingdom.

== Formula One ==
=== 1973 ===
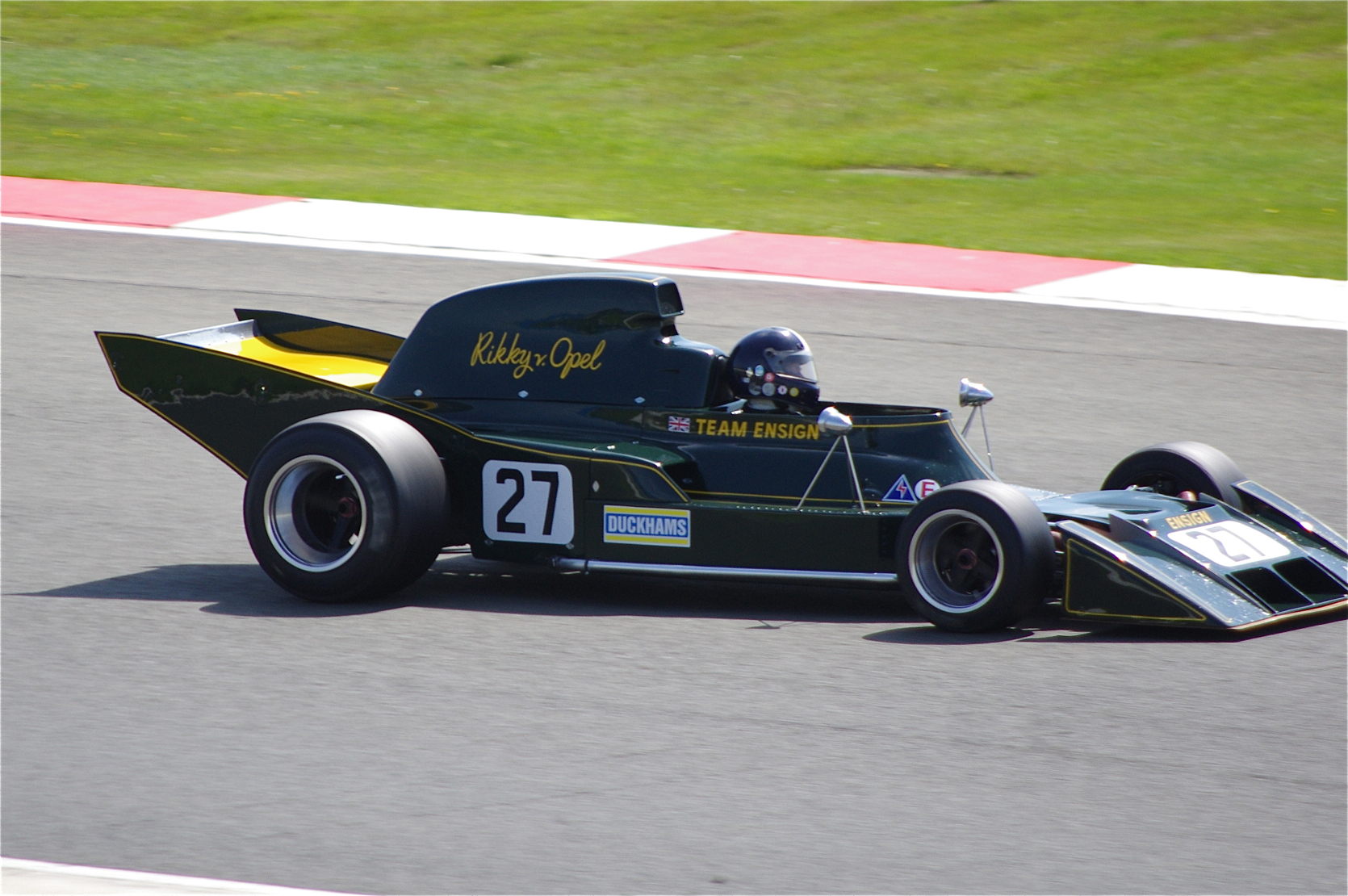
Opel's Ensign N173 in 2012

Von Opel's Formula One debut coincided with that of the team that provided him with his big break, Ensign. Both began at Paul Ricard in France, the eighth race of the 1973 season, with von Opel qualifying his N173 25th and finishing 15th, three laps down. Great Britain was next, while von Opel finished 13th, six laps down, after starting from 21st.

More promising signs appeared to be on the horizon at Zandvoort for the Dutch Grand Prix, where von Opel qualified a very creditable 14th, ahead of former World Drivers' Champions Emerson Fittipaldi and Graham Hill. However, on the morning of the race, cracks were found in the chassis. With too little time to make repairs, von Opel was unable to start and the same issues prevented the team from starting in Germany too. Fuel system issues curtailed von Opel's Austrian Grand Prix where he qualified 19th, and an overheating engine ended his Italian Grand Prix, after qualifying 17th.

The North American climax offered little better; von Opel qualified 26th and last in Canada and was unclassified in the race, finishing 12 laps down, whilst in that year's United States Grand Prix he once again qualified last, 27th, and retired on the opening lap with his throttle jammed open. Von Opel's debut season produced no points, and he was unclassified in the Drivers' Championship.

=== 1974 ===
Ensign's car for the new season, the N174, was much like the N173, but at the opening round of 1974 in Argentina, von Opel discovered how little progress had really been made. He qualified 26th, again in last position, more than seven seconds slower than pole-sitter Ronnie Peterson and almost one and a half seconds slower than Guy Edwards, who qualified 25th. The handling of the car was so flawed that he chose to withdraw from the meeting. Shortly afterwards Opel quit the team.

Von Opel sat out the races in the Brazilian Grand Prix and South Africa until he took over the second Brabham seat from Richard Robarts, starting with the Spanish Grand Prix. Their BT44 was powered by the same Cosworth DFV V8 as the Ensign, but the chassis was far superior, so hopes were raised. However, von Opel could not make the most of it and he struggled to match the performance of new teammate, Argentine Carlos Reutemann.

Retiring with an oil leak in Spain, after qualifying 24th, and again a fortnight later in Belgium with a blown engine, from which he started 22nd, were not the lift in performance Opel wished for. Monaco was worse still, where he was the only driver that failed to qualify. Brief respite was found in Sweden and the Netherlands with his first top-ten finishes, ninth on both occasions (after qualifying 20th and 23rd respectively).

The promise was short-lived though, as failure to qualify next time out in France was the final straw for Brabham boss Bernie Ecclestone, and von Opel was replaced by Carlos Pace. For the second year running he was unclassified in the Driver's Championship with no points. A little over a year after his debut, the career of Liechtenstein's only Formula One driver was over.

== Personal life ==
Von Opel is the son of Fritz von Opel and a great-grandson of Adam Opel, the founder of the German car-maker Opel. His mother is von Opel's second wife, Emita Herrán Olozaga, the daughter of a Colombian diplomat. He was born in the United States and lived in St. Moritz, Switzerland during his youth - often secretly challenging his cousin Gunter Sachs and friend Alexander Onassis to flat-out midnight bobsled runs at the St. Moritz-Celerina Olympic Bobrun. He chose to represent Liechtenstein in racing despite having no connection to the country, and proclaimed before one of his Grands Prix that "When I win, I want to hear the German national anthem".

After his stint in Formula One, von Opel retired to a Buddhist monastery in rural Thailand and became a monk. His exact whereabouts are unknown and his only contact with the outside world comes in the form of a post office box, the location of which is known by only a select few of his acquaintances.

== Results ==
=== Complete Formula One World Championship results ===
(key)

Year	Entrant	Chassis	Engine	1	2	3	4	5	6	7	8	9	10	11	12	13	14	15	WDC	Points
1973	Team Ensign	Ensign N173	Cosworth V8	ARG	BRA	RSA	ESP	BEL	MON	SWE	FRA; 15	GBR; 13	NED; DNS	GER	AUT; Ret	ITA; Ret	CAN; NC	USA; Ret	NC	0
1974	Team Ensign	Ensign N174	Cosworth V8	ARG; DNS	BRA	RSA													NC	0
1974	Motor Racing Developments	Brabham BT44	Cosworth V8				ESP; Ret	BEL; Ret	MON; DNQ	SWE; 9	NED; 9	FRA; DNQ	GBR	GER	AUT	ITA	CAN	USA	NC	0

== See also ==
- Adam Opel
- Fritz von Opel
- Opel
- Wilhelm von Opel

Sporting positions
Preceded by Roger Williamson	British Formula 3 Championship; BRSCC North Central Lombard Series Champion; 1972	Succeeded by Tony Brise
