= Opal (disambiguation) =

Opal is a gemstone.

Opal or OPAL may also refer to:

== Places ==
=== Canada ===
- Opal, Alberta
- Opal Hills, Jasper National Park, Alberta
- Opal Cone, a volcano in British Columbia

=== United States ===
- Opal, Missouri, an unincorporated community
- Opal, South Dakota, an unincorporated community
- Opal, Virginia, a census-designated place
- Opal, Wyoming, a town

== Science and technology ==
=== Biology and medicine ===
- Opal (apple), a variety of apple produced by crossing Golden Delicious and Topaz varieties
- Opal (butterfly), common name for the butterfly genus Chrysoritis
- Omeprazole or Opal, a drug
- Opal phytolith, a rigid microscopic body that occurs in many plants
- Opal, a stop codon
- Open Air Laboratories, an initiative in England to get the public more involved with nature

=== Computing ===
- Opal programming language, developed at Technische Universität Berlin
- Open Phone Abstraction Library (OPAL), a fork of the H323plus project supporting H.323, SIP, IAX2
- Opal Storage Specification, a storage specification developed by the Trusted Computing Group

=== Physics ===
- Open-pool Australian lightwater reactor, a scientific facility in Sydney, Australia
- OPAL experiment and detector, of the Large Electron-Positron Collider at CERN

=== Space ===
- OPAL (Outer Planet Atmospheres Legacy) Project, observation project of the Hubble Space Telescope

== Arts and entertainment ==
- The Opal (annual), an annual gift book from 1844 to 1849
- Opal (band), a 1980s rock band from Los Angeles, US
- Jack Stauber's OPAL, a 2020 short film that premiered on Adult Swim

=== Fictional entities ===
- Opal (EastEnders) a character on the BBC soap opera EastEnders
- Opal (The Simpsons), a talk show host on The Simpsons
- Opal Otter, the mother of Peanut, Baby Butter and Jelly Otter in PB&J Otter
- Opal City, a fictional city in the DC Comics universe
- Opal, a fictional character in the Cartoon Network show Steven Universe
- Opal, a fictional character in the Nickelodeon show The Legend of Korra

== Ships ==
- HMS Opal, two ships of the British Royal Navy
- USS Opal (PYc-8), a United States Navy patrol vessel during World War II

== Transportation ==
- Opal (fuel), a brand of petrol produced by BP Australia
- Opal (armoured personnel carrier), a Polish vehicle
- Opal card, a smart card used on Sydney's transport network

== Other uses ==
- Opal (given name)
- OPAL pipeline, a natural gas pipeline in Germany
- The Opal, a journal written by the patients of the Utica State Lunatic Asylum c. 1851
- Opal (sea otter), a sea otter at the Monterey Bay Aquarium
- Tropical Storm Opal, several tropical cyclones worldwide have been named Opal
- Opal Telecom, a former UK business broadband and telephone provider, now known as TalkTalk Business
- Opal Tower (Leeds), a skyscraper in Leeds, England
- Opal Tower (Sydney), a skyscraper in Sydney, Australia
- Australia women's national basketball team or the Opals
- Opal, a product by Nói Síríus

== See also ==
- Upal, a town in Xinjiang, China
- Opals (disambiguation)
- Opel (disambiguation)
