= Fritz von Opel =

German engineer (1899–1971)

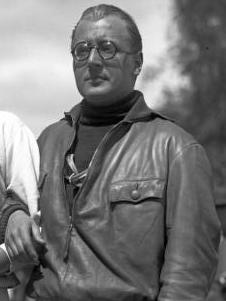
- Fritz von Opel at an international motorboat race in 1928
- Born: 4 May 1899; Rüsselsheim am Main, Grand Duchy of Hesse, German Empire
- Died: 8 April 1971 (aged 71); Samedan, Graubünden, Switzerland
- Education: Technische Universität Darmstadt
- Employer: Opel
- Known for: Rocket propulsion
- Children: Rikky von Opel
- Parent: Wilhelm von Opel
- Relatives: Adam Opel (grandfather); Carl von Opel (uncle); Gunter Sachs von Opel (nephew)

Fritz Adam Hermann von Opel (4 May 1899 – 8 April 1971), known as Fritz Adam Hermann Opel until his father was ennobled in 1917, was the only son of Wilhelm von Opel and a grandson of Adam Opel, founder of the Opel company. He is remembered mostly for his Opel RAK demonstrations of the world's first crewed rocket-powered ground and air vehicles that earned him the nickname "Rocket Fritz" and which were also highly effective as publicity stunts for his family's automotive business.

== Life and career ==
Opel was born in Rüsselsheim. He studied at the Technische Universität Darmstadt and received his doctorate from the university. After graduation, he was made director of testing for the Opel company and also put in charge of publicity.

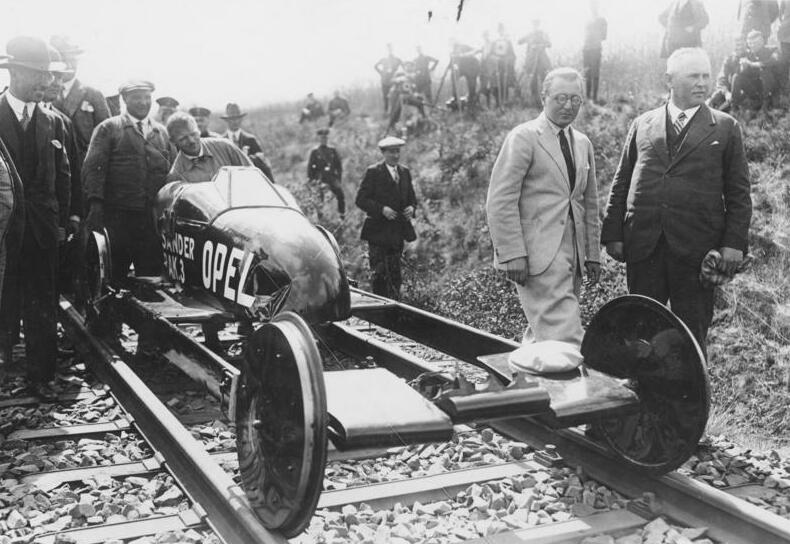
His RAK.3 rocket-powered railway car in 1928

Fritz von Opel was a grandson of Adam Opel and son of Wilhelm von Opel. His sister was Elinor von Opel, a cousin Georg von Opel. When his father Wilhelm was raised to hereditary nobility in 1917, his descendants were also ennobled. In 1929 he married his first wife Margot Löwenstein (also known as Sellnik), an actress and one of Germany's first female aviators, and after the divorce eventually his second wife in 1947, Emita Herrán Olozaga, daughter of the diplomat Rafael Bernando Herrán Echeverri and his wife Lucia Olozaga. This marriage resulted in two children, Frederick von Opel, called Rikky (* 1947), and Marie Christine von Opel, called Putzi (1951–2006).

Until 1928 he was a partner in the Adam Opel company, until then a family limited partnership. In Dec. 1928, the company was converted into a stock corporation, but already in March 1929, 80% of the shares were sold to General Motors Corporation of the US. The Opel heirs received 120 million Reichsmarks in return. A few years later, Adam Opel AG was completely owned by General Motors. Fritz von Opel invested part of his large fortune in the USA, where it was confiscated during the war.

Von Opel was highly successful in different kinds of motorsports, inter alia he won the inaugural race on Berlin's AVUS race track on 24 September 1921 on an Opel 8/25 hp racing car with a 2.3 litre four-cylinder engine, with an average speed 128.84 km/h and also was setting the lap record of the first racing weekend with 8 min 14 s. Two years later, on 24 June 1923 he won at the AVUS track on a Opel 346 cc motorbike the race organized by the German Motorcyclists' Association DMV with an average speed of 87 km/h. Fritz von Opel was also active in motorboat racing where he e.g. dominated with his "Opel II", equipped with two Maybach Mb IVa engines of each 260 hp, the July 1927 series of events on the Seine in Paris. He was winning the "Coupe de France", the "Prize of the French Naval Minister" and finally the "Trophée de Paris". In Germany he continued his winning spree in 1927 with the "Blue Band of the Rhine", the ADAC regatta on Lake Starnberg and was eventually crowned German Champion at the ADAC Motorboat Championship on Templiner See.

=== Opel-RAK ===
Opel-RAK was a series of rocket powered cars and planes commissioned by Fritz von Opel, in association with Max Valier co-founder of the "Verein für Raumschiffahrt", and Friedrich Wilhelm Sander. The publicity stunts were instrumental in initiating Raketenrummel, a “Rocket Rumble” or fad with the public. In the 1920s the experiments with rockets lead to speed records for automobiles, rail vehicles and the first crewed rocket-powered flight on the 11 June 1928. In 1928, Opel tested his first rocket-powered car, the Opel RAK.1, and achieved a top speed of 75 km/h (47 mph) in it, proving the feasibility of the concept of rocket propulsion. Also in 1928, one of his rocket-powered cars, the Opel RAK2, driven by von Opel himself at the AVUS speedway in Berlin, reached a record speed of 238 km/h, watched by 3000 spectators and world media, among them Fritz Lang, director of Metropolis and Woman in the Moon, world boxing champion Max Schmeling and many more sports and show business celebrities. A world record for rail vehicles was reached with RAK3 and a top speed of 256 km/h.

The “Rocket Rumble" fad was highly influential on a teenage space enthusiast Wernher von Braun. Wernher was so enthusiastic after seeing one of the public Opel RAK rocket car demonstrations, that he constructed his own homemade toy rocket car and caused a disruption in a crowded sidewalk by launching the toy wagon, to which he had attached the largest firework rockets he could purchase. He was later taken in for questioning by the local police, until released to his father for disciplinary action. The incident is noteworthy for highlighting the young Wernher’s determination to “dedicate his life to space travel”.

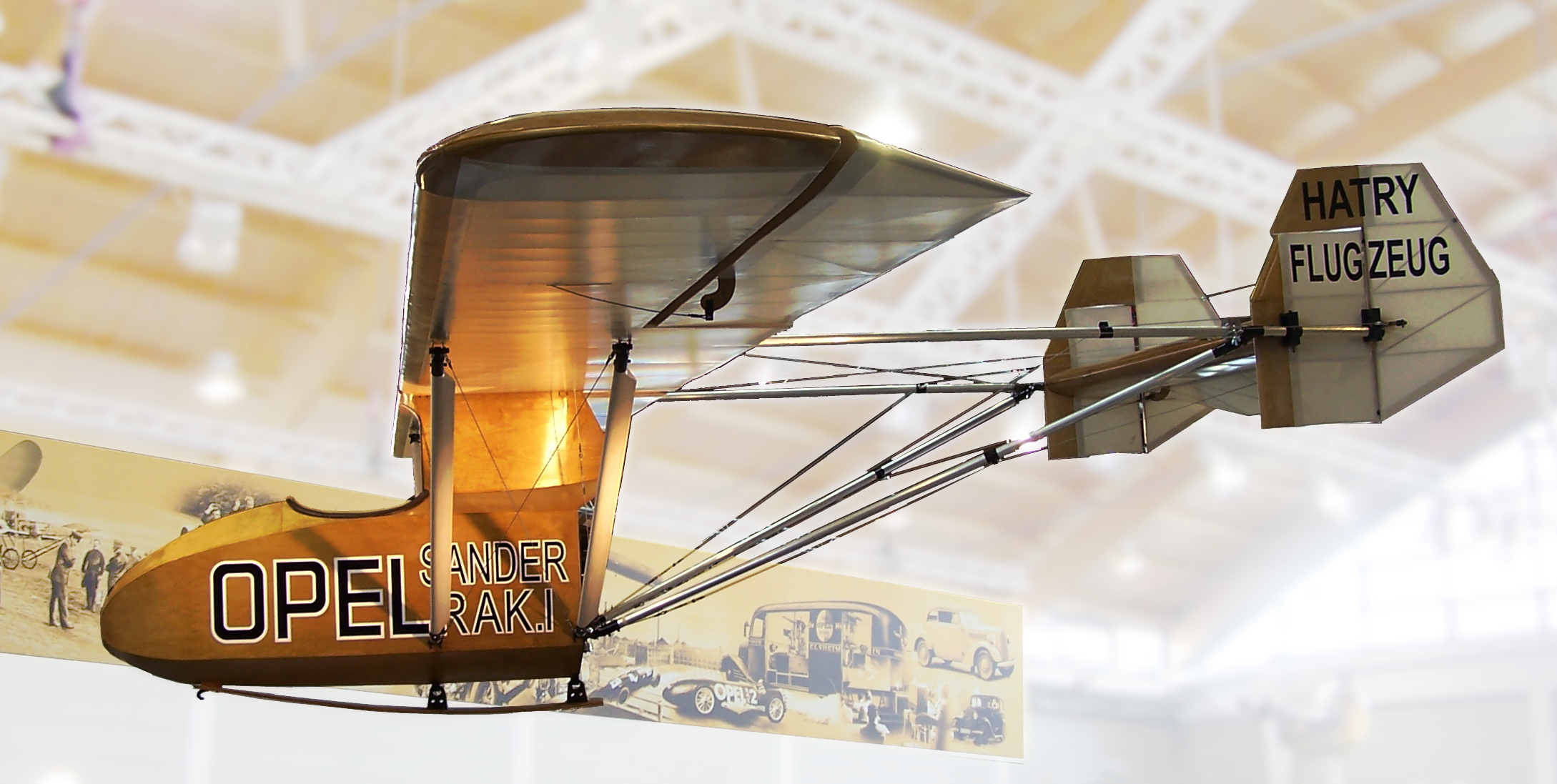
Opel RAK.1, on display at Mannheim museum of technology "Technoseum"

Von Opel’s team then formed a deal with the Rhön-Rositten Gesellschaft, a local glider society, which provided a sailplane named the "Lippisch Ente" (Ente is "duck" in German) designed by Alexander Lippisch while von Opel financed and arranged for the rocket motors to be attached. The plane was piloted by test pilot Fritz Stamer, who flew the world's first rocket plane on 11 June 1928. One of the rockets exploded on its second test flight and wrecked the plane. After this fiery crash the sponsoring glider society decided to abandon the project.

Von Opel then commissioned a new aircraft, also called the RAK.1, designed by Julius Hatry. On 17 September 1929, the prototype and the final launch catapult was ready and Hatry piloted the plane about 500 meters at a height of 20 meters at a speed of 100 km / h, propelled by three solid fuel rockets that had 350 kilopond thrust and four seconds of burn time. Von Opel then arranged a public flight and flew it at Frankfurt-am-Main on the 30 September 1929. Von Opel proclaimed that this was “world’s first rocket plane,” conviently forgetting about the preceding rocket non-public test flights by Stamer and Hatry. According to the space historians Frank H. Winter and Walter J. Boyne of the National Air and Space Museum in Washington, D.C., the RAK.1 is the world's first dedicated rocket plane.

==== Timeline ====
- 15 March 1928, first rocket-powered car, the Opel RAK.1 driven by Max Valier.
- 23 May 1928 RAK.2 driven by von Opel.
- 11 June 1928 Lippisch Ente, the world's first rocket glider piloted by Fritz Stamer as test pilot
- 17 September 1929 RAK.1 plane as world's first dedicated rocket plane designed by Julius Hatry and piloted by Julius Hatry as test pilot
- 30 September 1929 RAK.1 plane designed by Julius Hatry piloted by von Opel before public and media
- In the meantime, another mishap had claimed the RAK.3, a rocket-powered railway car powered by 30 solid-fuel rockets which had reached a speed of 254 km/h (157 mph).
- Also in 1928, Opel built and test ran a rocket-powered motorcycle called the Monster.

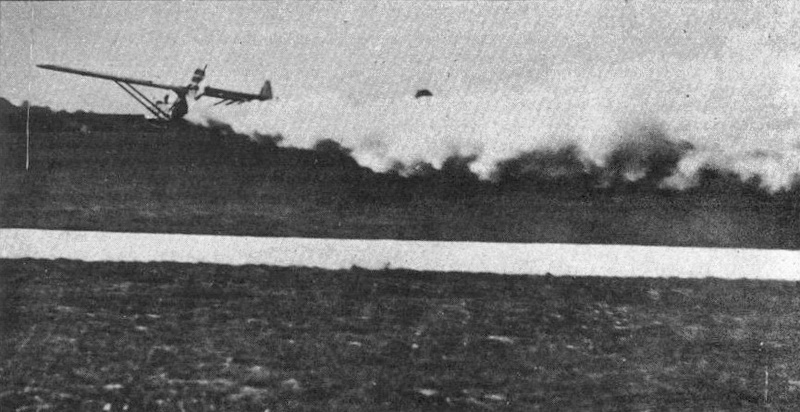
Opel RAK.1 - First public flight of a rocket plane on 30 September 1929, at Frankfurt-Rebstock

=== Break-up of Opel RAK ===
The future of the industry in Germany had appeared uncertain, and competition from imports of automobiles from the USA had increased. Fritz von Opel and other family members had rejected a larger merger of German automobile companies, which the Association of the German Automobile Industry (RdA), Deutsche Bank and DANAT-Bank proposed in 1927/28. In October 1928 a purchase option was negotiated with GM. A stock corporation, registered on 3 December 1928 was founded as "Adam Opel AG " with a share capital of 60 million Reichsmark. In March 1929 the contracts were signed by Fritz von Opel, his father Wilhelm and his uncle Fritz on the part of the Opel family, the name "Opel" was retained. GM initially took over 80% of the shares representing a nominal value of 48 million Reichsmarks, and GM acquired the remaining 20% in October 1931.

=== Life after Opel RAK break-up ===
After the end of the Opel-RAK collaboration with Opel and Sander, Max Valier continued the efforts. Also switching from solid-fuel to liquid-fuel rockets, he died while testing and is considered the first fatality of the dawning space age. The impact of Opel RAK was both immediate and long-lasting on later spaceflight pioneers. Opel, Sander, Valier and Hatry had engaged in a program that led directly to use of jet-assisted takeoff for heavily laden aircraft. The German Reich was first to test the approach in August 1929 when a battery of solid rocket propellants supported a Junkers Ju-33 seaplane to get airborne. The Opel RAK experiments had a tremendous influence on Lippisch, whose experience with the rocket-powered "Ente" eventually paved the way to the Messerschmitt Me-163, the first operational rocket fighter craft. The Opel RAK experiments excited also the interest of the German military, which provided funding for further development of rockets as a replacement for artillery. This led to an array of military applications, among them Germany's V-2 terror weapon, the world's first ballistic missile. After World War II, these German rocket and missile scientists and engineers would have an immense impact on missile and space programs by the United States of America. Walter J. Boyne, director of the National Air and Space Museum in Washington, DC, concluded "Working together, von Opel, Valier, and Sander had thrown a big rock of publicity into the mill pond of science. The ripples have not yet ceased to spread."

Von Opel left Germany before 1930, first to the US and eventually to France and Switzerland where he died. He was present at the Secret Meeting of 20 February 1933 when German industrialists decided to support Adolf Hitler, but did not contribute personally to the donations. His sister Elinor von Opel had to flee Germany in 1935 with her sons, Ernst Wilhelm Sachs von Opel and Gunter Sachs von Opel, due a legal battle on her divorce and because of her public aversion to Nazi leadership, friends of her former husband Willy Sachs. Elinor's German assets were blocked and confiscated by the German Reich government.

On 25 April 1940, Fritz von Opel was taken off the Italian liner Conte di Savoia by the British authorities at Gibraltar. After being detained at Gibraltar for 16 days, he was allowed to proceed to the United States, arriving in May on the Italian liner Rex. He was arrested by the Federal Bureau of Investigation in February 1942, as a "potentially dangerous alien", although he was subsequently released.

In 1947, Opel married Emita Herrán Olózaga and became the father of Formula One driver Rikky von Opel (Frederick von Opel), who was born later the same year.

He died at Samedan in Switzerland in 1971.

== Weltraumschiff I film featuring Opel RAK pioneers ==
The 1937 German film Weltraumschiff I startet –Eine technische Fantasie– is a short movie made by Anton Kutter in 1937 about the fictitious launch of a space rocket that lands back on Earth after orbiting the Moon in an Apollo 8-style mission: In front of representatives of the press, the director of the Friedrichshafen airship yard announced the first crewed rocket flight to the Moon. In an introduction he describes the history of rocket technology and the technical details of space travel. Immediately before take-off, reporters interviewed the commander of the spaceship via video radio, which then flies over a kilometer-long ski jump into space and returns safely to Earth after orbiting the Moon.

The movie features impressive visual effects and has short clips of various RAK vehicles: 11 seconds at 436 feet (approximately 04:47) igniters being wired to the Rak.2 car; 2 seconds at 447 feet (approximately 04:58) Max Valier seated in a RAK.2 car labeled "Rückstoss Versuchs Wagen"; 2 seconds at 451 feet (approximately 05:00) Fritz von Opel seated in a RAK.2 car; 11 seconds at 460 feet (approximately 05:06) Fritz Von Opel drives the RAK.2 car on 1928 May 23 at the Avus Track in Berlin; 2 seconds at 472 feet (05:14) Opel RAK.3 rocket car on 1928 June 23 running on railway tracks; 19 seconds at 475 feet (05:16 to 05:35) Opel RAK.1 rocket glider in 1928 September, preparation and launch; 6 seconds at 536 feet (05:57 to 06:03) Max Valier sitting and talking in a RAK.6 car.
