= Adam Opel =

Founder of Opel and manufacturer of bicycles and sewing machines

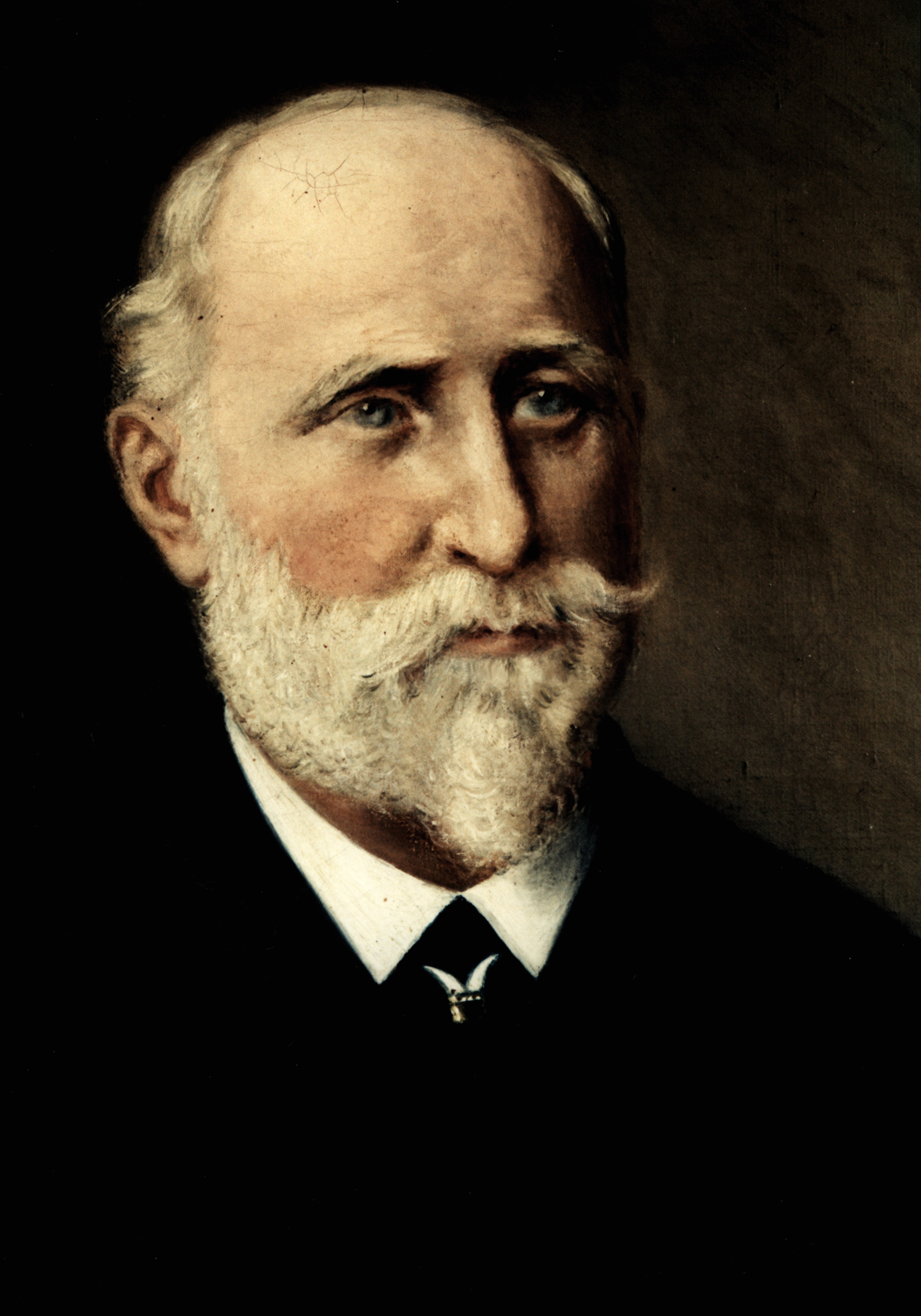
- Born: 9 May 1837; Rüsselsheim, Hesse
- Died: 8 September 1895 (aged 58); Rüsselsheim, Germany
- Occupations: manufacturer of bicycles and sewing machines
- Known for: Founder of Opel
- Spouse: Sophie Opel (m. 1868)
- Children: 5, including Carl and Wilhelm
- Relatives: Fritz von Opel (grandson); Rikky von Opel (great-grandson); Gunter Sachs (great-grandson)

Adam Opel (9 May 1837 – 8 September 1895) was a German entrepreneur who founded the company Adam Opel AG, then a manufacturer of bicycles and sewing machines.

== Biography ==
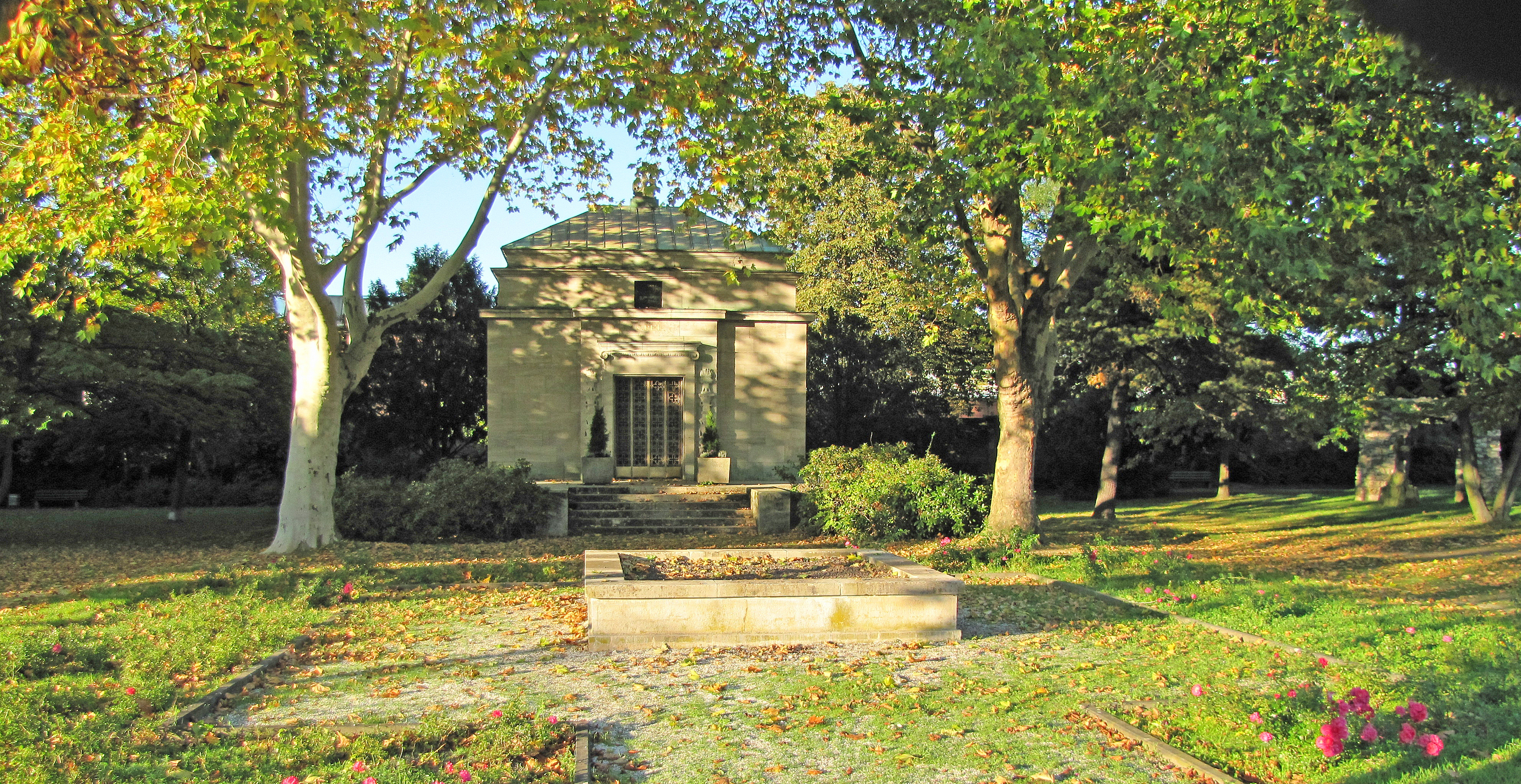
Opel-Mausoleum in Rüsselsheim

Adam Opel was born on 9 May 1837 to Wilhelm, a locksmith, and his wife in Rüsselsheim. Opel studied with his father until the age of 20, when he received his travel pass. The pass enabled him to be an apprentice locksmith in Belgium, in Liège, Brussels, and then Paris, where he arrived in mid-1858. While in Paris, he took an interest in an innovation—the sewing machine. In 1859, he went to work for a maker of sewing machines to get a closer look. Opel's younger brother, George, also came to Paris to absorb this new technology. In 1862, Adam Opel returned to Rüsselsheim.

Opel's uncle offered him an unused cow stall in Rüsselsheim to set up a workshop in which to build his own sewing machine. In 1863, George returned from France to help in the slow production of the machines. In April 1867, Opel was preparing to build a new two-story factory near the railroad station, when his father died. Opel attached a new home to his factory and married the daughter of a guest-house and brewery family, Sophie Scheller. Sophie brought with her a substantial dowry, which she invested in the Opel plant. Sophie convinced two of her sisters to invest as well, and a steam engine was purchased, helping to expand the firm. In 1870 a new sewing machine called “Sophia” was introduced, named after Opel's wife.

In the 1880s, sewing machine production jumped ahead, with steady expansion of the plant, and by 1899 more than a half million machines had been made. The milestone of one million machines was reached in 1911, the same time a fire destroyed much of the plant. The Opel brothers decided to give up sewing machine production, which by this time was much more commodified, and thus commercially unrewarding, than when they had started in the business. Looking to move upmarket in their manufacturing efforts, they decided to try to produce the more profitable products of bicycles and automobiles.

Adam and Sophie Opel had five sons (Carl, Wilhelm, Heinrich, Friedrich, and Ludwig), who took wholeheartedly to wheels. Together with Sophie, who became main shareholder after the death of her husband, they would pilot the Opel enterprises down the automotive path. Bicycles came into the picture when Adam Opel's curiosity was stirred by a high-wheeled bicycle he saw in Paris. Intrigued, he ordered a set of parts from England. After putting together the bike Opel tried it with disastrous results. He decided he'd have nothing further to do with those "bone breakers." Two things changed his mind: he found them easy to sell, with a greater profit than he could earn with the sewing machines; and his sons begged him mercilessly for bicycles of their own.

By 1886 the Opels had made a bicycle of their own, and the following year young Carl went to England to study the new industry and bring back samples of the latest designs. This led to serious production of cycles, including low-wheeled and three-wheeled types, by the end of 1887. The growing bands of enthusiasts for the novel means of locomotion knew they could count on Opel for the newest and best ideas in cycling in Germany. In fact, all Opel brothers were outstanding, prize-winning racers.

Adam Opel never lived to see the automobiles built by the company he founded. He died in 1895. His will set up a new organization for the company, in which his widow Sophie held the primary interest and his two eldest sons had lesser shares.

Their first crisis was a sudden deflation of the boom in bicycles in 1898, a collapse caused by the over-expansion among the many makers of cycles. They managed to carry on. New products were introduced that kept on the more than 1,500 employees, most of whom had grown up in the industry with Opel. The bicycle plant expanded, eventually becoming the largest in the mid-1920s, with a capacity of 4,000 cycles a day, with innovative equipment such as automatic painting and plating equipment in halls pressurized for ideal cleanliness.

By the 1930s, times had changed. In a series of transactions between 1929 and 1931, the Opel family sold their business, Adam Opel AG, to General Motors Corporation, of which it became a subsidiary. In 1936, Opel sold its bicycle plant to NSU in Neckarsulm (which had started making bicycles at about the same time as Opel). Under the company's many different names, 2.5 million bikes had been produced in all.

== See also ==
- Fritz von Opel
- Rikky von Opel
- Wilhelm von Opel
- Carl von Opel
- Sophie Opel

== Sources ==
- Opel's official biography

Heinzmann, Sieger (2016). Die visuelle Biografie Opel - Wie alles begann...: - heinzmann collection Berühmte Erfinder (in German). tredition. ISBN 978-3-7345-6237-2. Neue Deutsche Biographie, Volume 19 (in German). Bavarian Academy of Sciences and Humanities. 1999. ISBN 3-428-00200-8.
