= Wilhelm von Opel =

German industrialist (1871–1948)

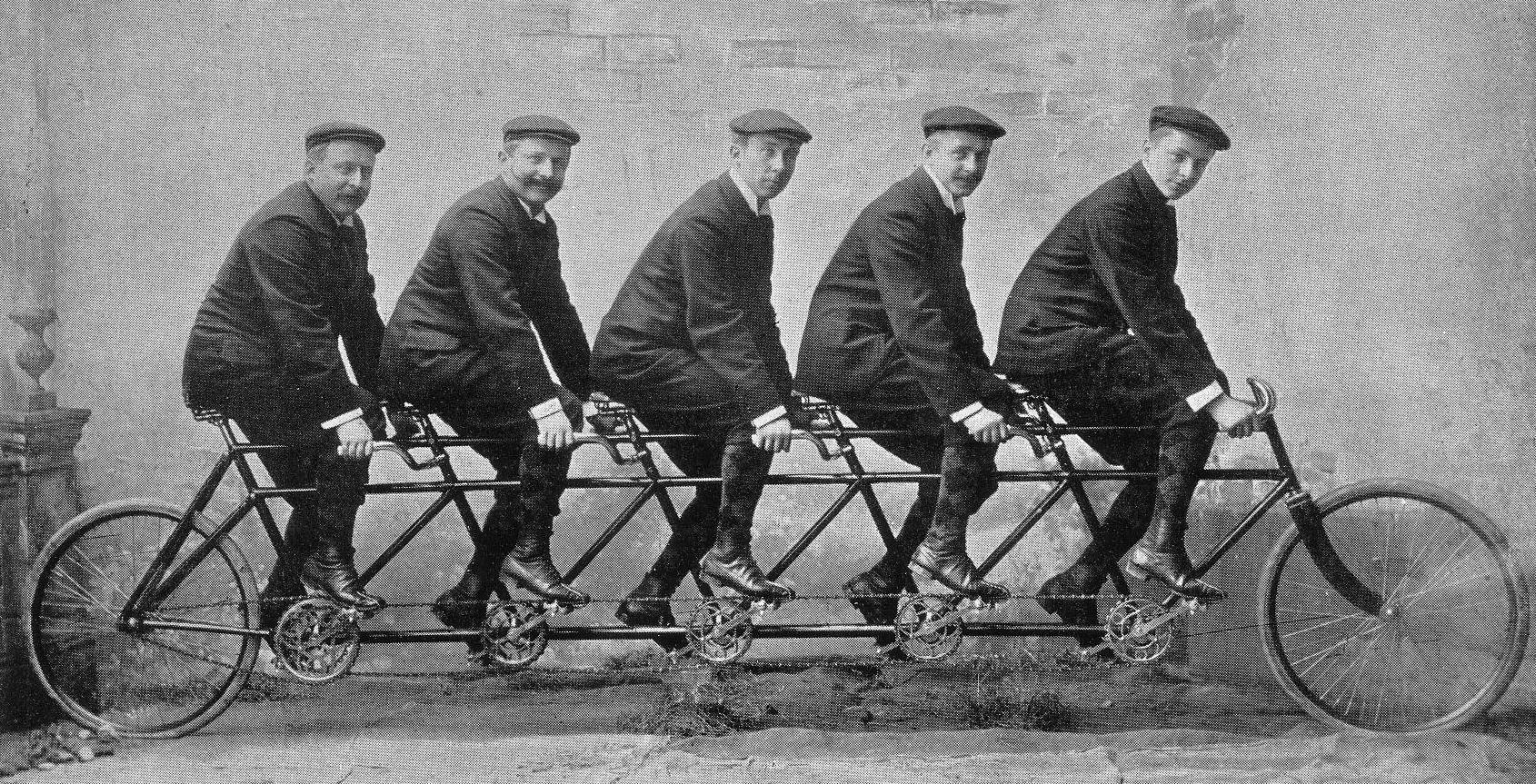
- The Opel brothers on a five-seat tandem bicycle, 1912: Carl, Wilhelm, Heinrich, Fritz, Ludwig
- Born: 15 May 1871; Rüsselsheim am Main, Grand Duchy of Hesse, German Empire
- Died: 2 May 1948 (aged 76); Wiesbaden, Hesse, Southwest Zone, Allied-occupied Germany
- Education: Technische Hochschule Darmstadt
- Employer: Opel
- Known for: Opel
- Children: 2, including Fritz
- Parent(s): Adam Opel; Sophie Opel
- Relatives: Carl von Opel (brother); Rikky von Opel (grandson); Gunter Sachs (grandson)

Wilhelm Albert von Opel colloquially Wilhelm von Opel (née Opel; 15 May 1871 – 2 May 1948) was a German industrialist who was a majority shareholder of the German automobile manufacturer Opel. Opel is primarily known for introducing the assembly line to the German automobile industry.

== Early life and education ==
Opel was born 15 May 1871 in Rüsselsheim, Grand Duchy of Hesse (presently Germany), the second of five children, to Adam Opel and Sophie Marie Opel (née Scheller). His siblings were;

His father founded the family business, initially as a manufacturer of sewing machines, and later diversified into bicycle manufacturing. His mother hailed from a peasant family from Dornholzhausen in Rhineland-Palatinate. In 1869, his maternal grandfather, Friedrich Scheller won 100,000 Talers (equivalent to $3–4 million in 2025), which he split equally among his nine children. This helped the Opels to purchase new manufacturing machinery.

Opel studied engineering at Technische Hochschule Darmstadt and received his doctorate in 1912 from the university.

== Career ==
After Adam's death in 1895, control of the company passed to his wife and five sons. In 1898, Wilhelm and his brother Fritz brought Opel into the automobile industry with the purchase of the small Lutzmann automobile factory at Dessau.

== Personal life ==
On 14 September 1897, Opel married Charlotte Luisa Lina Bade, a daughter of Hermann Bade and Minna Bade (née König), of Hildesheim, Lower Saxony. They had three children;

- Friedrich Adam Opel, colloquially Fritz von Opel (1899–1971), married firstly to Margot Löwenstein (1902–1993), married secondly to Emma Herrán Olozaga (1913–1967), two children including Rikky von Opel (born 1947) and Marie Christine von Opel (1951–2006)
- Martha Wilhelma Opel (1904–1907), died in childbed
- Elinor Sigrid Else Opel, colloquially Eleonore von Opel (1908–2001), married Wilhelm "Willy" Josef Sachs (1896–1958), married secondly to Carlo Kirchner. She had two sons, including Gunter Sachs (1932–2011).

In 1917, Wilhelm and his brother Heinrich were ennobled in the Grand Duchy of Hesse. Their brother Carl was raised to the same rank the following year. Since then those lines carry the prefix von to their original family name.

In 1933, Opel joined the Nazi Party and soon became an active supporter of it, making financial contributions to the SS and being awarded the title of Patron. In January 1947, he was found guilty by a denazification court and had to pay a large fine. He died the following year.
