= Carl von Opel =

German entrepreneur (1869–1927)

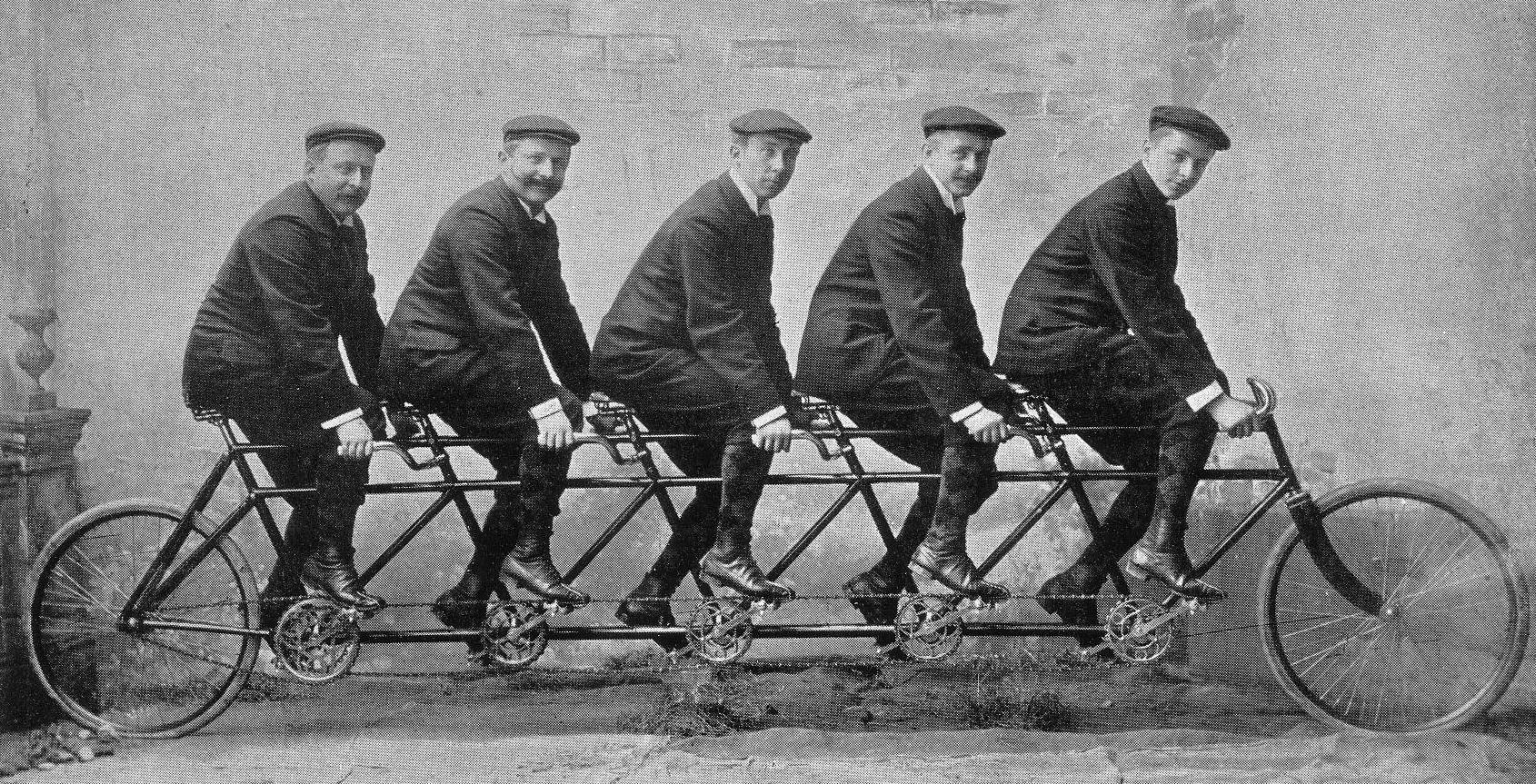
- The Opel brothers on a five-seats tandem bicycle, 1912: Carl, Wilhelm, Heinrich, Fritz, Ludwig
- Born: 31 August 1869; Rüsselsheim am Main, Germany
- Died: 16 February 1927 (aged 57); Frankfurt am Main, Germany
- Employer: Opel
- Known for: Opel
- Spouse: Helena Wilhelmine Mouson
- Children: 4
- Parent(s): Adam Opel; Sophie Opel
- Relatives: Wilhelm von Opel (brother); Fritz von Opel (nephew)

Georg Adolf Carl von Opel (31 August 1869 – 16 February 1927), known as Georg Adolf Carl Opel before being ennobled in 1918, was a bank specialist and industrialist of the Opel family and one of the founders of the German automobile manufacturer Opel.

== Biography ==
Carl's parents are Adam and Sophie Opel. His father had founded the family firm in 1862 in Rüsselsheim as a manufacturer of sewing machines, and later diversified into bicycle manufacturing. After Adam's death in 1895, control of the company passed to his wife and two of his sons. In 1898, Carl and his brothers Wilhelm and Fritz brought Opel into the automobile industry with the purchase of the small Lutzmann automobile factory at Dessau.

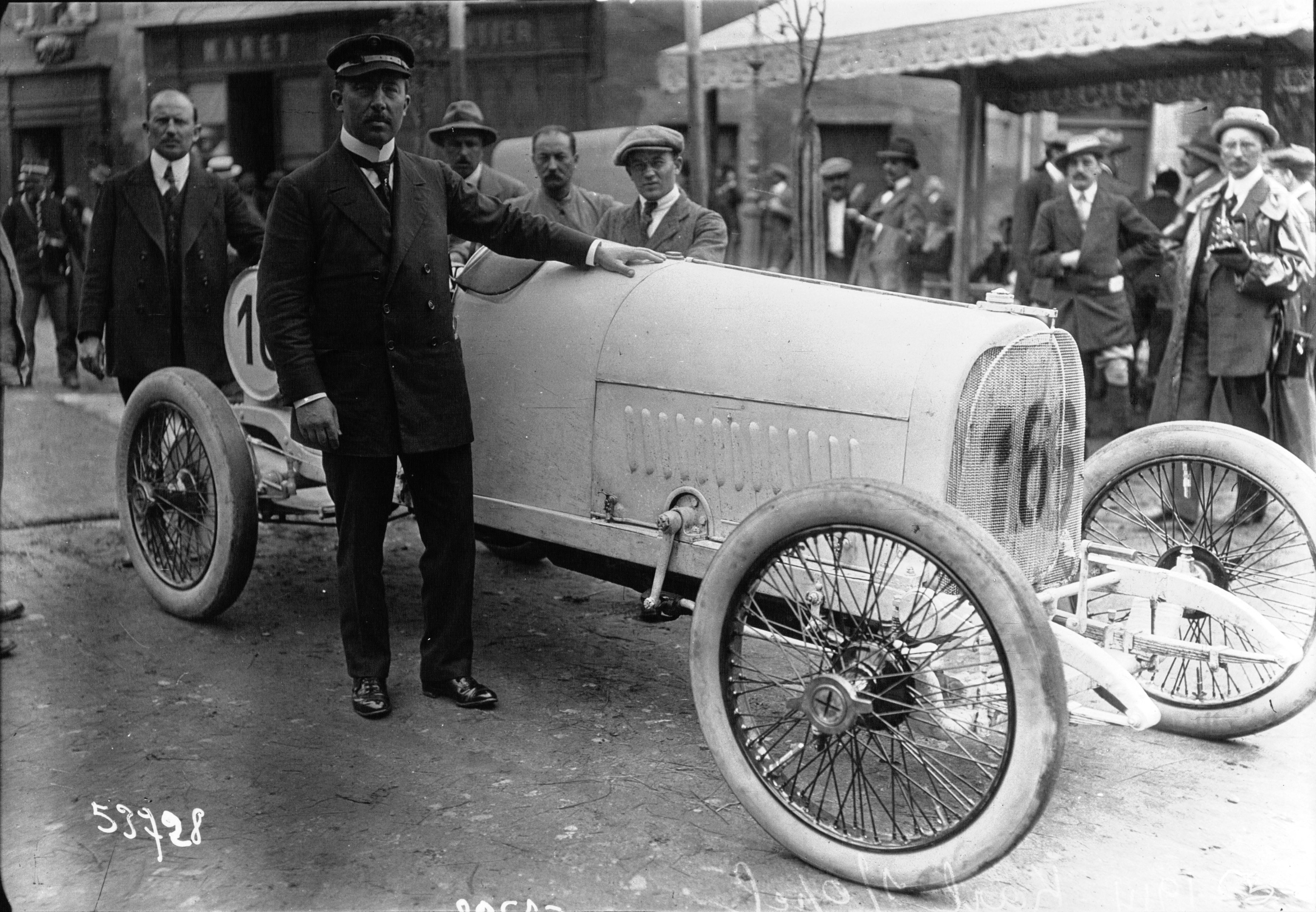
Carl Opel at the French Grand Prix, 1914

On 30 May 1895 he married Helena Wilhelmine Mouson, daughter of Johann Jacob Mouson and of Eleonore Dorothea Hock. He had two sons and two daughters, Johann Jacques, Georg, Sophie and Eleonore.

On 17 January 1918 in Darmstadt, Carl was raised to the nobility of the Grand Duchy of Hesse, one year later than his brothers Wilhelm and Heinrich. In the same year he was appointed as privy councillor.

Carl von Opel was a member of the Corps Franconia Darmstadt.

The name the 'Opel Karl' small car built in 2015 is an homage to this Opel ancestry.

== See also ==
- Adam Opel
- Wilhelm von Opel
- Sophie Opel
- Fritz von Opel
- Rikky von Opel

== Literatur ==
- "Opel, Georg Adolf Carl von". Landesgeschichtliches Informationssystem Hessen (LAGIS) (in German). Hessian State Office for Historical Regional Studies (Hessisches Landesamt für geschichtliche Landeskunde, HLGL).
- Genealogisches Handbuch des Adels, Adelslexikon Band X, Band 119 der Gesamtreihe, C. A. Starke Verlag, Limburg (Lahn) 1999, ISSN 0435-2408.
- Hans Christoph Graf von Seherr-Thoß (1999). "Opel, Carl von". Neue Deutsche Biographie (in German). Vol. 19. Berlin: Duncker & Humblot. p. 542. (full text online). (genealogical information only, original article of all familymembers on Opel, Friedrich Karl Adam Georg von)
