= Sophie Opel =

German entrepreneur

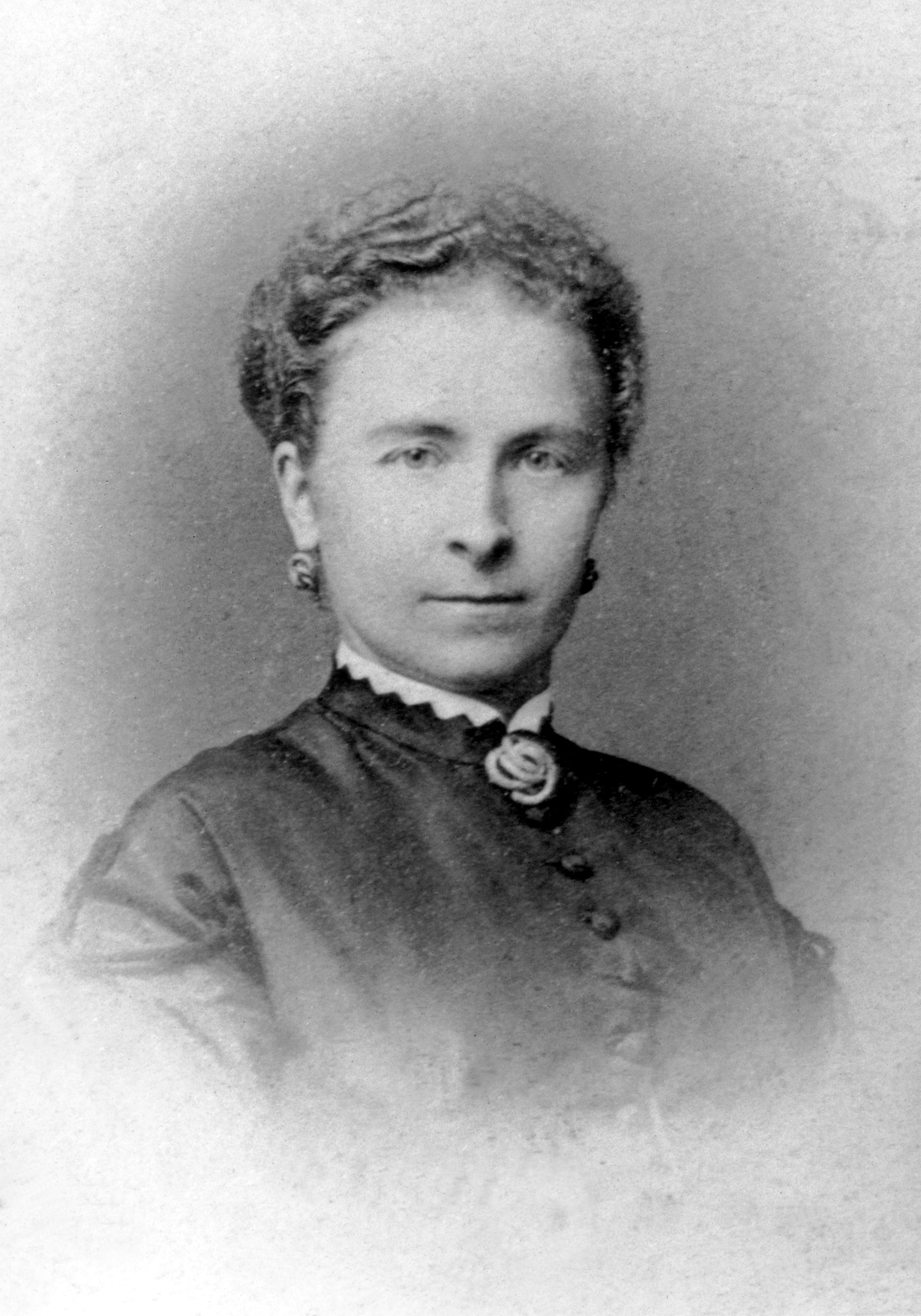
- Born: Sophie Opel; February 13, 1840; Dornholzhausen, Grand Duchy of Hesse, German Empire
- Died: October 30, 1913 (aged 73); Rüsselsheim, Rhine Province, German Empire
- Occupation: Industrialist
- Years active: 1868 - 1913
- Known for: Transforming Opel to automobile manufacturing company and being its major and controlling shareholder
- Spouse: Adam Opel (m. 1868; died 1895)
- Children: 5, including Carl and Wilhelm

Sophie Marie Opel also referred to as Mother Opel (née Scheller; February 13, 1840 - October 30, 1913) was a German industrialist. Under her management and controlling interest Opel transformed from manufacturing sewing machines and bicycles to automobiles.

== Early life and education ==
Opel was born Sophie Marie Scheller on February 13, 1840, in Dornholzhausen, Grand Duchy of Hesse, German Empire, to Friedrich Franz Scheller and Susanna Maria Scheller (née Fischer). She had 13 siblings. Her parents were innkeepers and operated the inn "zum Hirschen" which her father purchased in 1828. She attended the local schools where she also learned the French language.

== Career ==
After marrying into the Opel family, she would soon be involved and participating in the Adam Opel works of her husband. However, initially her dowry wouldn't be lavish, as the Scheller family was not wealthy. In 1869, her father, Friedrich Scheller, won 100,000 Thalers in the Lottery of the Duchy of Brunswick which he split between his surviving ten children. Sophie Opel invested her stake in the company of her husband which ultimately led to the purchase of a new steam engine. Her sisters Dorothée and Elise Scheller also invested in the Adam Opel works in Rüsselsheim and she managed the transformation from sewing machine and bicycle production to an automobile factory. After the death of her spouse and company owner Adam Opel in 1895 she became biggest shareholder and with two of her sons she developed the company to a leading European car company. In 1895 the firm already had over 1,000 employees.

== Personal life ==
On November 17, 1868, she married Adam Opel, the founder of Opel. They resided on the industrial land of the factory in Rüsselsheim and had five sons;

- Georg Adolf Carl "Carl" (August 31, 1869 - February 16, 1927)
- Wilhelm Albert "Wilhelm" (May 15, 1871 - May 2, 1948)
- Heinrich Adam "Heinrich" (September 22, 1873 - May 25, 1928)
- Friedrich Franz "Fritz" (April 30, 1875 - August 30, 1938)
- Ludwig (January 1, 1880 - April 16, 1916)

Sophie Opel died on October 30, 1913, from heart failure aged 73. She was buried in Rüsselsheim am Main.

== Literature ==
- Gerta Walsh: Sophie Opel – Unternehmerin im 19. Jahrhundert. In: Hessische Heimat. Heft 2/1992, S. 68–70
