= De Tomaso 505/38 =

Italian racing car

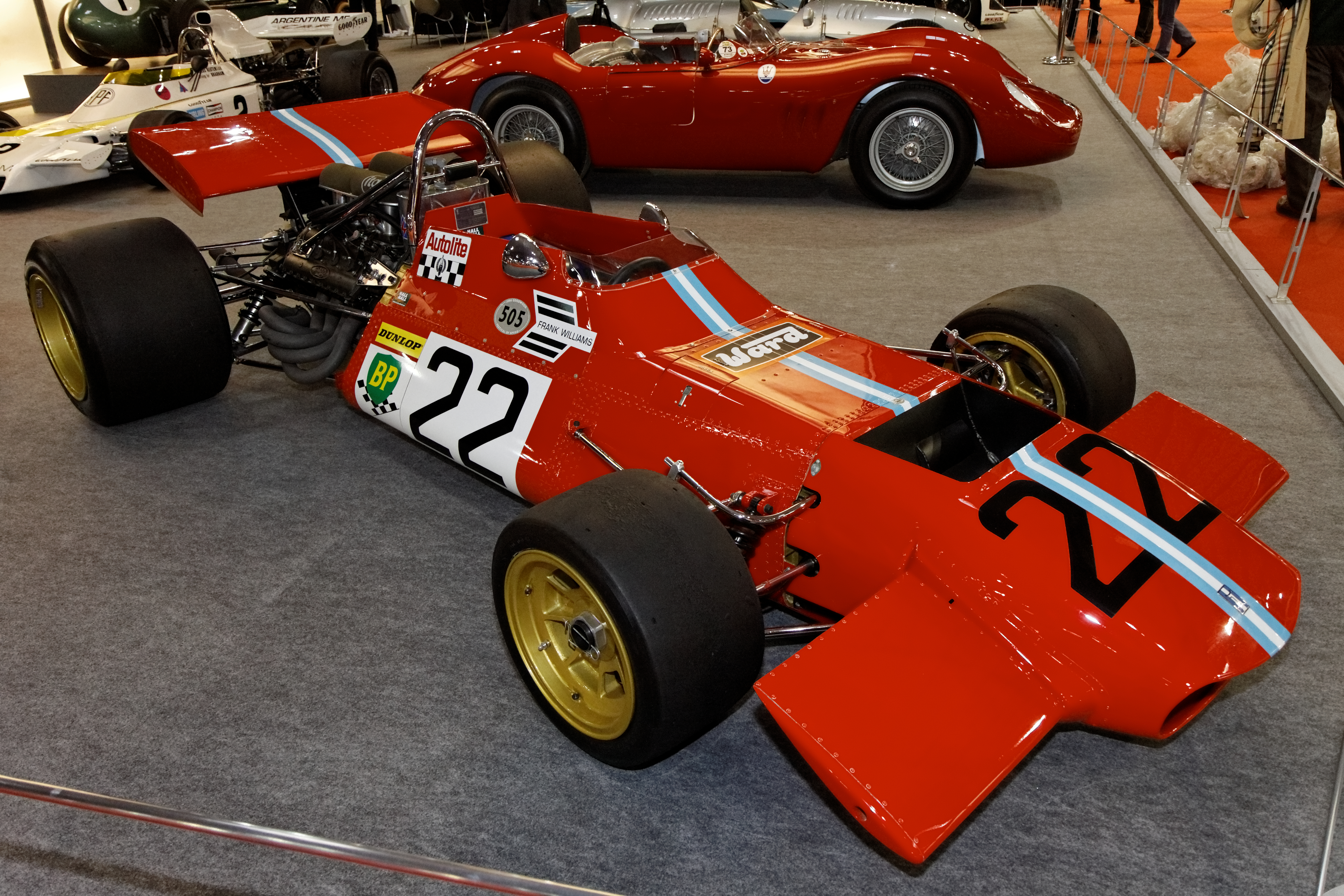
- Category: Formula One
- Constructor: De Tomaso
- Designer: Giampaolo Dallara
- Predecessor: F1 / 801

Technical specifications
- Chassis: Aluminium monocoque
- Engine: Ford Cosworth DFV 2,993 cc (182.6 cu in) V8 NA mid-engined
- Transmission: Hewland DG300 5 speed
- Weight: 563 kg (1,241.2 lb)
- Fuel: Castrol
- Tyres: Dunlop

Competition history
- Notable entrants: Frank Williams Racing Cars
- Notable drivers: (United Kingdom) Piers Courage (United Kingdom) Brian Redman (Australia) Tim Schenken
- Debut: 1970 South African Grand Prix
Races	Wins	Podiums	Poles	F/Laps
11	0	0	0	0
- Constructors' Championships: 0
- Drivers' Championships: 0
- Unless otherwise stated, all data refer to Formula One World Championship Grands Prix only.

The De Tomaso 505/38 is a Formula One racing car model, designed by Giampaolo Dallara for Italian car-manufacturer De Tomaso and raced during the 1970 Formula One season by Frank Williams Racing Cars.

The car was uncompetitive on debut, failing to finish or be classified the first four races of the year. Disaster struck at the following Dutch Grand Prix. Driver Piers Courage was killed in an accident that saw his De Tomaso 505 flip and catch fire. The loss deeply upset Williams; the distance the team principal now places between himself and his drivers has been attributed to this event.

The car never managed to be classified in a World Championship race, finishing only twice, in Monaco and Canada, twelve and eleven laps behind the winner respectively.

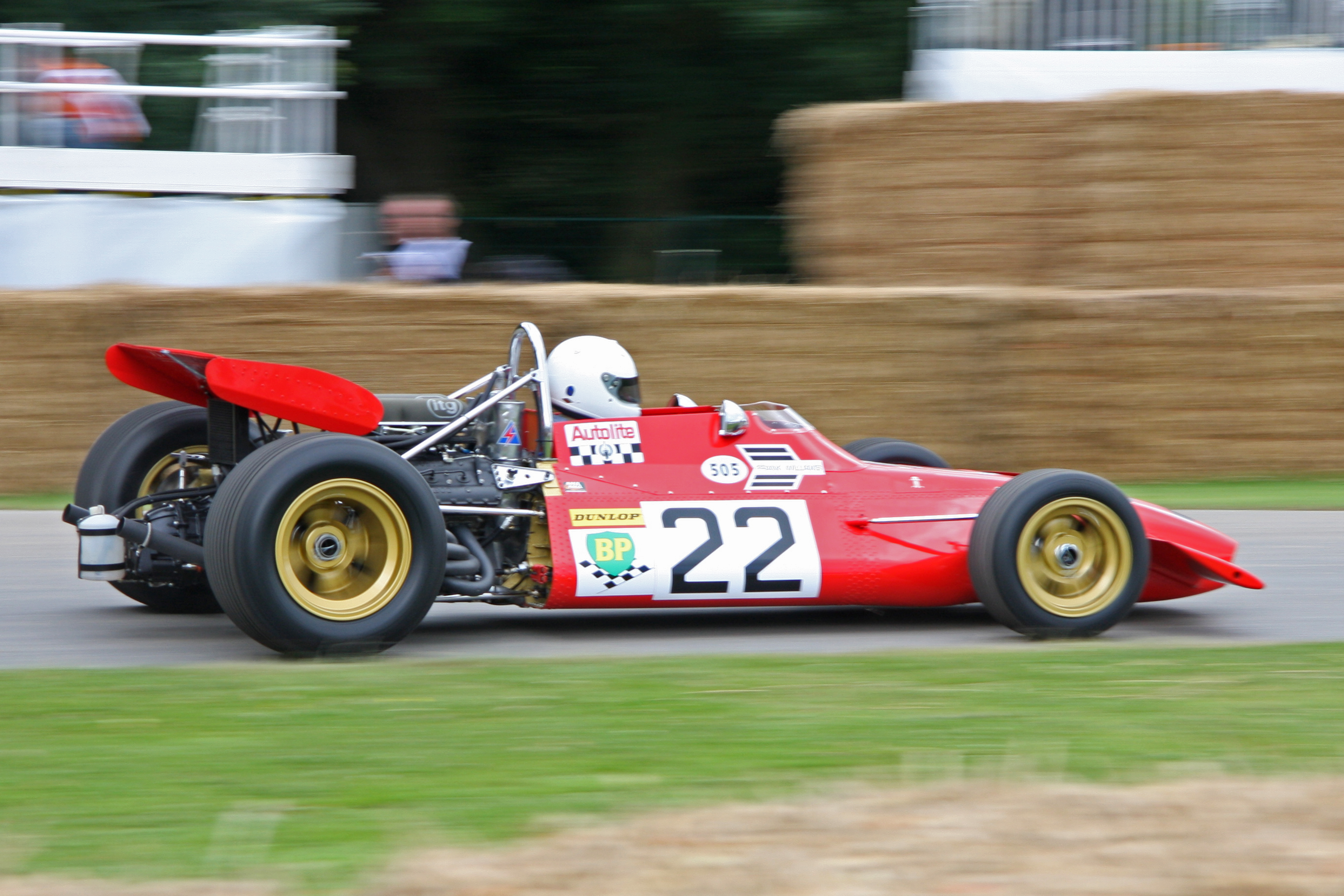
De Tomaso 505 at the 2008 Goodwood Festival of Speed

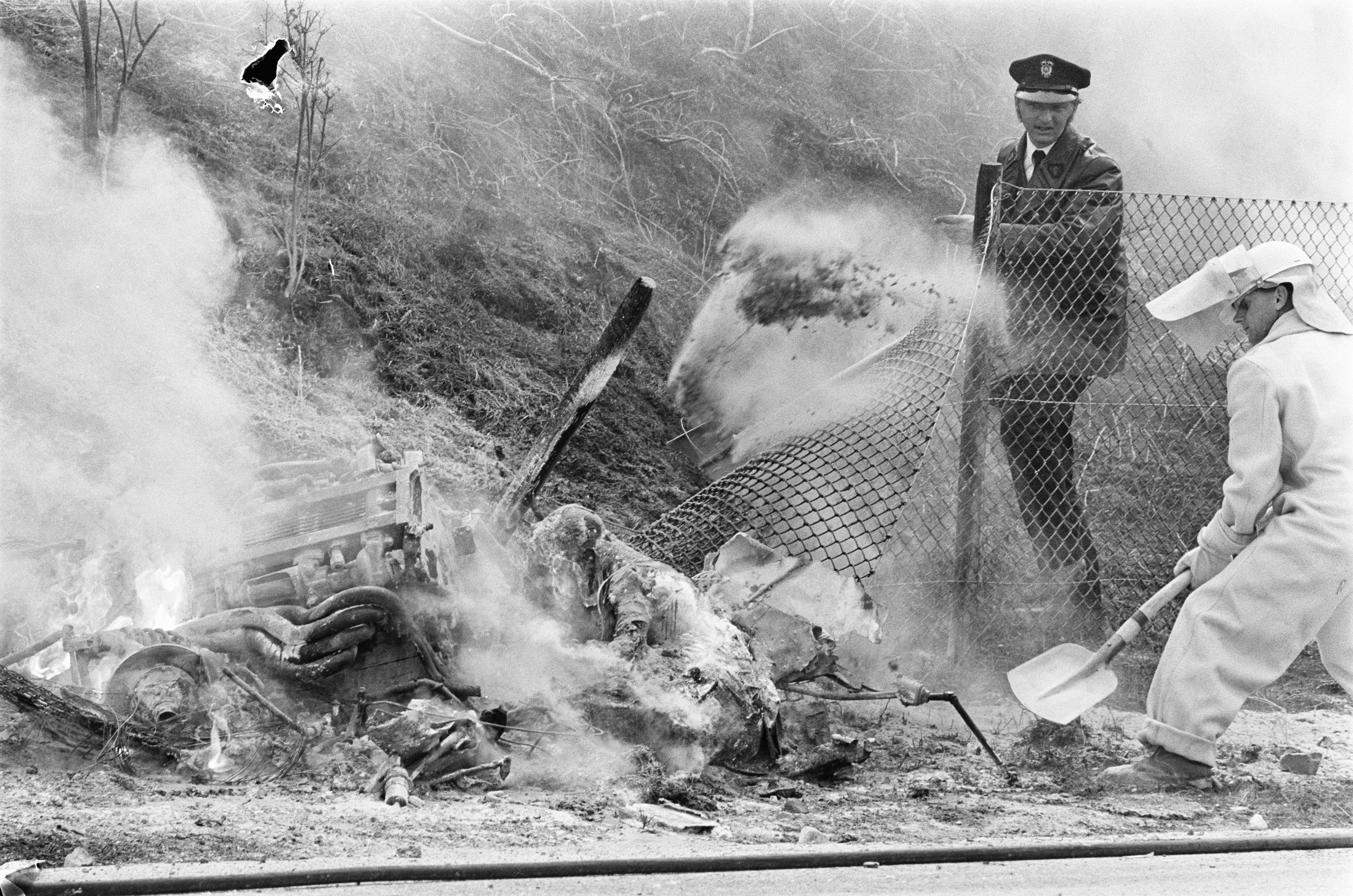
The wreck of Piers Courage's 505/38 after his fatal accident at the 1970 Dutch Grand Prix

== Complete Formula One World Championship results ==
(key)

Year	Entrant	Engine	Tyres	Drivers	1	2	3	4	5	6	7	8	9	10	11	12	13	Points	WCC
1970	Frank Williams Racing Cars	Ford Cosworth DFV; 3.0 V8	D		RSA	ESP	MON	BEL	NED	FRA	GBR	GER	AUT	ITA	CAN	USA	MEX	0	-
1970	Frank Williams Racing Cars	Ford Cosworth DFV; 3.0 V8	D	Piers Courage	Ret	DNS	NC	Ret	Ret									0	-
1970	Frank Williams Racing Cars	Ford Cosworth DFV; 3.0 V8	D	Brian Redman							DNS	DNQ						0	-
1970	Frank Williams Racing Cars	Ford Cosworth DFV; 3.0 V8	D	Tim Schenken									Ret	Ret	NC	Ret		0	-

== Non-Championship Formula One results ==
(key) (Races in bold indicate pole position) (Races in italics indicate fastest lap)

Year	Entrant	Engines	Tyres	Drivers	1	2	3
1970	Frank Williams Racing Cars	Ford V8	**D**		ROC	INT	OUL
1970	Frank Williams Racing Cars	Ford V8	**D**	Piers Courage		3	
1970	Frank Williams Racing Cars	Ford V8	**D**	Tim Schenken			DNA
