= 1970 BRDC International Trophy =

- combined Formula One/Formula 5000 race
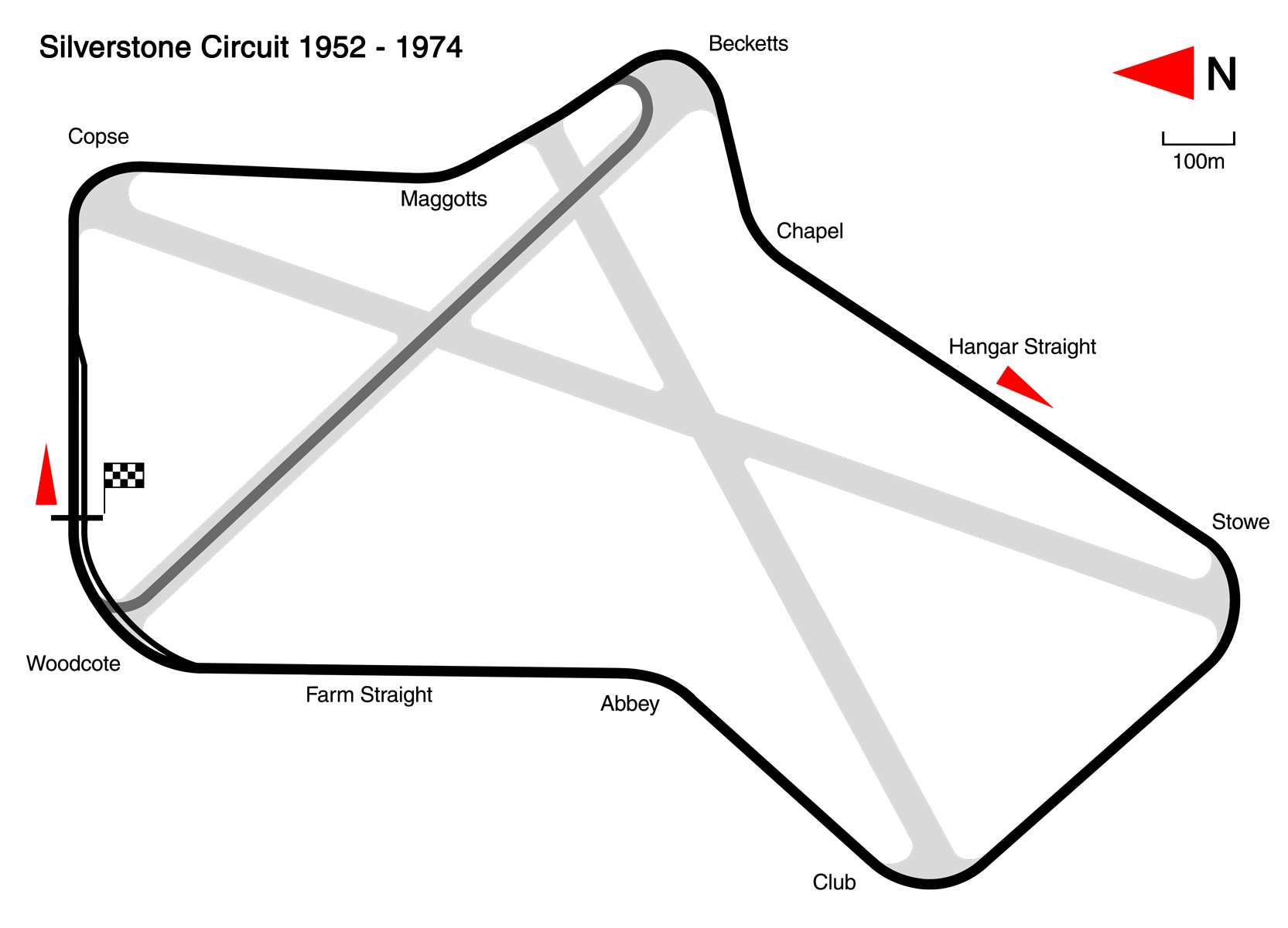

Race details
- Date: 26 April 1970
- Official name: XXII Daily Express BRDC International Trophy
- Location: Silverstone Circuit, Northamptonshire
- Course: Permanent racing facility
- Course length: 4.714 km (2.923 miles)
- Distance: 2 x 26 laps, 244.80 km (152.11 miles)

Pole position
Driver	(New Zealand) Chris Amon	March
- Time: 1:21.4

Fastest lap
Driver	(New Zealand) Chris Amon	March
- Time: 1:22.1 (1st heat)

Podium
First	(New Zealand) Chris Amon	March-Cosworth
Second	(United Kingdom) Jackie Stewart	March-Cosworth
Third	(United Kingdom) Piers Courage	De Tomaso-Cosworth

The 22nd BRDC International Trophy was a motor race held at Silverstone on 26 April 1970 for Formula One and Formula 5000 cars.

The race was run over 2 heats of 26 laps each, the final results being an aggregate of the two. Chris Amon, driving a F1 March-Cosworth, qualified in pole position and set fastest overall lap. Amon won heat one, and Jackie Stewart, also in a March, won heat two, with Amon winning on aggregate results. Mike Hailwood, driving a Lola-Chevrolet, was the best-placed F5000 driver, finishing seventh overall.

== Classification ==
Note: the classification was the sum of the times obtained in the two heats; a blue background indicates a Formula 5000 entrant.

Pos	Driver	Constructor	Laps	Time/Ret.
1	(New Zealand) Chris Amon	March-Cosworth	52	1:13:32.2
2	(United Kingdom) Jackie Stewart	March-Cosworth	52	+ 10.0
3	(United Kingdom) Piers Courage	De Tomaso-Cosworth	52	+ 1:03.1
4	(New Zealand) Bruce McLaren	McLaren-Cosworth	52	+ 1:44.1
5	(Sweden) Reine Wisell	McLaren-Cosworth	51	+ 1 Lap
6	(New Zealand) Denny Hulme	McLaren-Cosworth	50	+ 2 Laps
7	(United Kingdom) Mike Hailwood	Lola-Chevrolet	50	+ 2 Laps
8	(Australia) Frank Gardner	Lola-Chevrolet	50	+ 2 Laps
9	(United Kingdom) Graham Hill	Lotus-Cosworth	50	+ 2 Laps
10	(United Kingdom) Mike Walker	McLaren-Chevrolet	50	+ 2 Laps
11	(United Kingdom) Davie Powell	Lola-Chevrolet	48	+ 4 Laps
12	(United Kingdom) Trevor Taylor	Surtees-Chevrolet	47	+ 5 laps
13	(United States) Pete Lovely	Lotus-Cosworth	46	+ 6 Laps
14	(United Kingdom) Gordon Spice	Kitchener-Ford	43	+ 9 Laps
15	(United Kingdom) Kaye Griffiths	Lola-Chevrolet	43	+ 9 Laps
16	(United Kingdom) Peter Gethin	McLaren-Chevrolet	40	+ 12 Laps
17	(United Kingdom) John Miles	Lotus-Cosworth	37	+ 15 laps
Ret	(Austria) Jochen Rindt	Lotus-Cosworth	33	Engine
Ret	(New Zealand) Howden Ganley	McLaren-Chevrolet	24	Mechanical
Ret	(Australia) Jack Brabham	Brabham-Cosworth	22	Engine
Ret	(United Kingdom) Fred Saunders	Crosslé-Rover	17	
Ret	(New Zealand) Graham McRae	McLaren-Chevrolet	16	
Ret	(United Kingdom) David Hobbs	Surtees-Chevrolet	9	
Ret	(United Kingdom) David Prophet	McLaren-Chevrolet	1	

== Notes ==
- Pole position: Chris Amon - 1:21.4
- Fastest laps: Chris Amon - 1:22.1 (Heat 1), Jackie Stewart - 1:23.3 (Heat 2)

Previous race: 1970 Race of Champions	Formula One non-championship races 1970 season	Next race: 1970 International Gold Cup
Previous race: 1969 BRDC International Trophy	BRDC International Trophy	Next race: 1971 BRDC International Trophy
