= De Tomaso P72 =

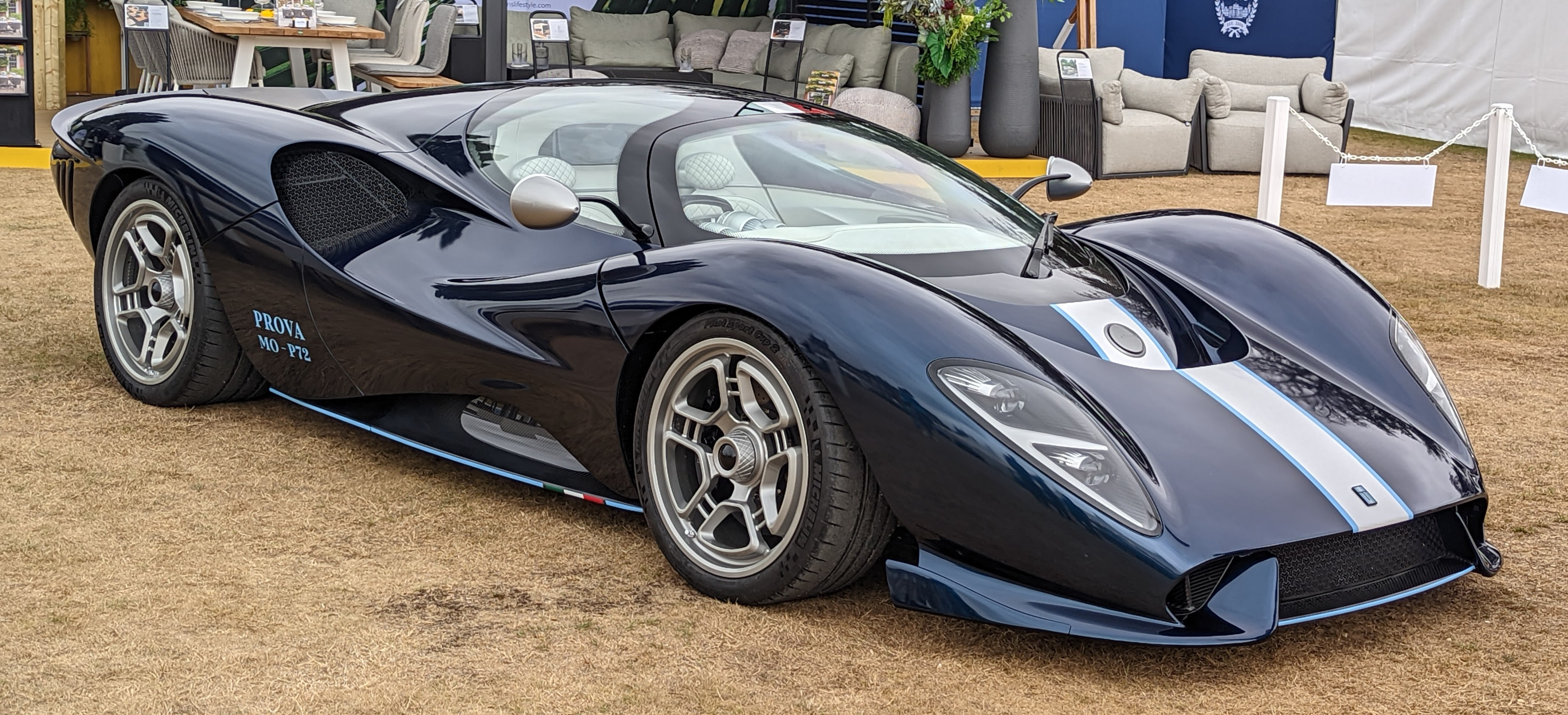

Overview
- Manufacturer: De Tomaso
- Production: 2024–present (72 units planned)
- Assembly: Germany: Affalterbach
- Designer: Jowyn Wong

Body and chassis
- Class: Sports car (S)
- Body style: 2-door coupé
- Layout: Rear mid-engine, rear-wheel-drive
- Doors: Dihedral
- Related: De Tomaso P900

Powertrain
- Engine: 5.0 L supercharged Ford Coyote V8
- Transmission: 6-speed manual

Dimensions
- Wheelbase: 2,700 mm (106.3 in)

The De Tomaso P72 is a sports car manufactured by the Italian automobile manufacturer De Tomaso. Based on the underpinnings of the Apollo Intensa Emozione, the P72 is designed as an homage to the De Tomaso P70 prototype racing car.

== Development history ==
The De Tomaso brand was acquired by Hong Kong–based Ideal Ventures in 2014, the same company who had acquired German automobile manufacturer Gumpert. Under the new management, work was started to revive the brand after a failed attempt in 2009. After an advertising campaign based on the company's history and some teaser videos of the new car in development under the code name "Project P", the company introduced the new sports car at the 2019 Goodwood Festival of Speed. The new car, called the P72 uses a carbon fibre monocoque chassis constructed to LMP1 standards and is based on the Apollo Intensa Emozione. Unlike the Intensa Emozione, the car is meant to be a grand tourer.

== Design ==
=== Exterior ===
Designed by Jowyn Wong of Wyn Design, the exterior design is based on the P70 racing car and the Le Mans race cars of the 1970s and combines modern elements with the classic shape. The exterior also features a top mounted exhaust system.

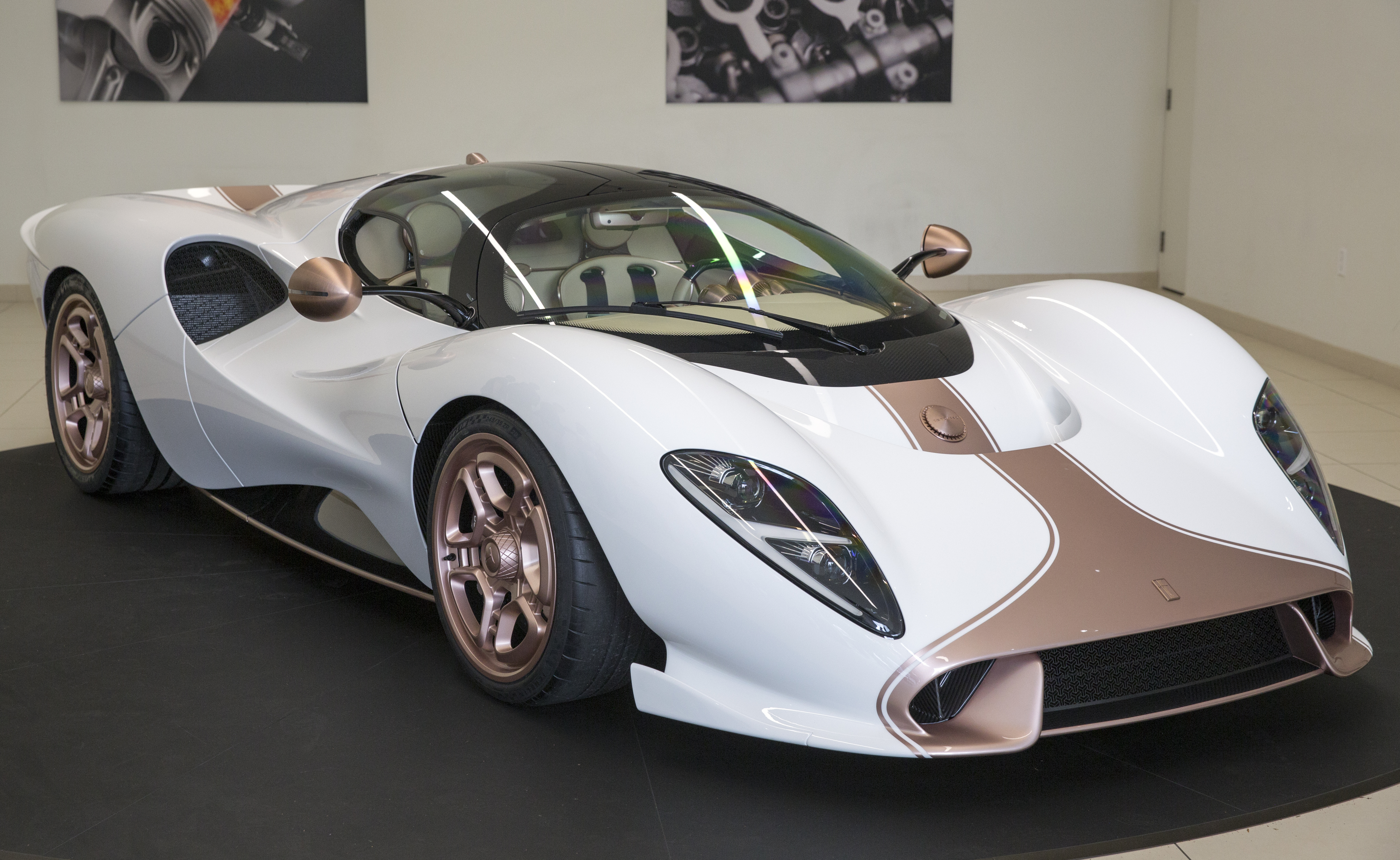
Front view

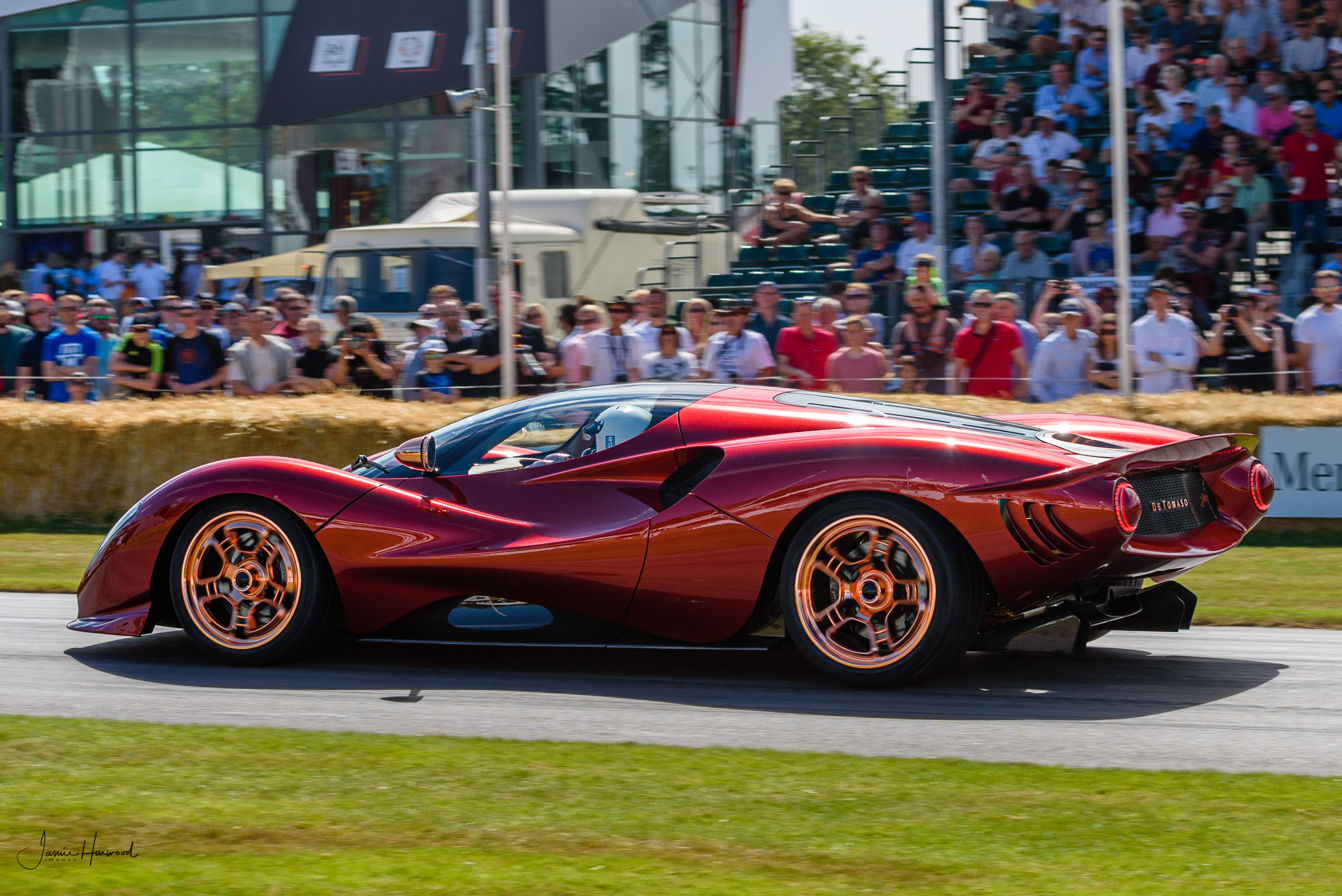
Side view

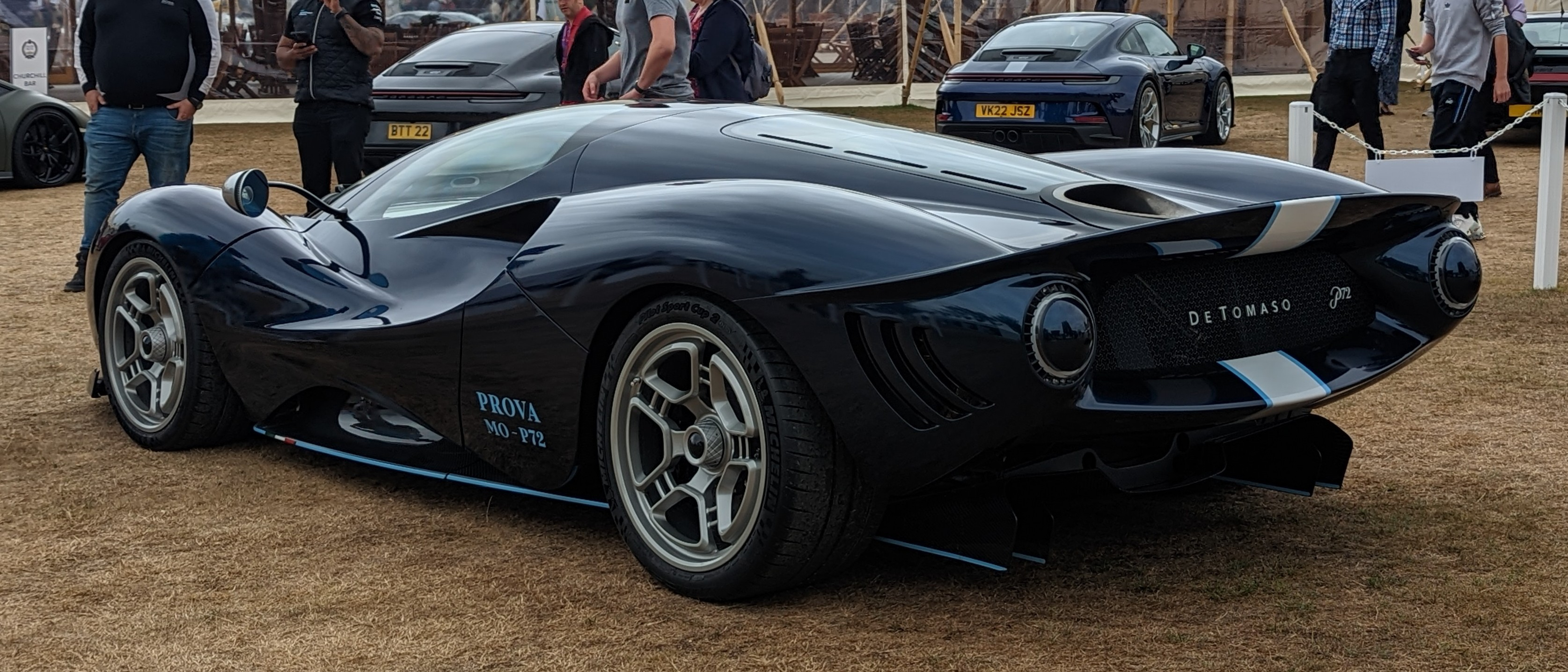
Rear view

=== Interior ===
The interior is upholstered in diamond stitched leather, and has opulent instrumentation featuring polished copper elements, along with an open linkage gearshift lever finished in copper of the manual transmission installed in the car. The interior also has circular analogue and digital instrumentation design to recall the car interiors of the 1960s and 1970s.

== Specifications ==
In October 2019, De Tomaso revealed that a 5.0 litre will power the P72, supercharged Ford Coyote V8 engine featuring a Roots-type supercharger manufactured by American tuning company Roush Performance. The engine is a result of a technical collaboration between both companies. The engine is mated to a 6-speed manual transmission. The power output is 750 HP with a torque output of 900Nm.

== Production ==
72 units of the P72 are planned to be produced, to ensure the exclusivity of the car. The car will go under homologation but De Tomaso have assured that the car will remain the same as the pre-production model shown at Goodwood. Initially, production of the P72 was to take place in Modena, Italy, but in 2020 plans were changed to launch it in the United States in cooperation with an external partner. In 2022, De Tomaso changed its plans again, announcing that the German company Capricorn Automotive from Mönchengladbach would be producing the P72 from mid-2023. These assumptions were also finally revised, ending with the construction of its own factory in Affalterbach, where trial assembly began in December 2024, which is to turn into series production in 2025. Production examples accordingly receive a German VIN, starting with W09/P72.
