= De Tomaso P900 =

Overview
- Manufacturer: De Tomaso
- Production: Upcoming
- Assembly: Germany: Affalterbach
- Designer: Jowyn Wong

Body and chassis
- Class: Sports car (S)
- Body style: 2-door coupé
- Layout: Rear mid-engine, rear-wheel-drive
- Doors: Dihedral
- Related: De Tomaso P72

Powertrain
- Engine: 4,200 cc (256.3 cu in; 4.2 L) Judd GV4.2 V10; Bespoke 6,200 cc (378.3 cu in; 6.2 L) V12
- Power output: 775 bhp (786 PS; 578 kW) @ 11,000 rpm 585 N⋅m (431 lbf⋅ft) (Judd V10 Engine); 888 bhp (900 PS; 662 kW) @ 12,300 rpm 1,000 N⋅m (740 lbf⋅ft) (Bespoke V12 Engine)
- Transmission: 6-speed Xtrac sequential manual transmission

Dimensions
- Kerb weight: 900 kg (1,984 lb) (dry)

The De Tomaso P900 is an upcoming high-performance limited-production sports car manufactured by Italian car company De Tomaso. A track-only special, its production was to be limited to 18 units, with delivery having commenced in early 2023. The P900 name is derived from the car's claimed dry weight, 900 kg (1,984 lb).

== Specifications ==
The P900's dry weight, combined with the offered option of a 6.2 L (378.3 cu in) V12 producing 900 PS (662 kW; 888 hp) gives the car a 1:1 power-to-weight ratio. De Tomaso also claims that the bespoke V12 in the P900 will be the lightest and shortest production V12 engine and will run on fully synthetic fuel. The V12 option will also not be available until till 2024, due to the development time needed to make the block suitable to run on synthetic fuels. Prior to then, customers taking delivery of the P900 in 2023 will have a Judd GV4.2-derived 4.2 L (256.3 cu in) V10 fitted, which produces slightly less power than the V12. Power delivery to the rear wheels is via an unspecified speed Xtrac sequential manual transmission.

As an evolution of the De Tomaso P72, the P900 maintains the P72's fully carbon-composite construction, alongside revised bodywork, and an adjustable rear wing similar to Formula One's drag reduction system. Other efforts to improve aerodynamic efficiency include underbody aero features and testing in Toyota Gazoo Racing Europe's former Formula One wind tunnel.
