= 1970 Formula One season =

24th season of the FIA's Formula One motor racing

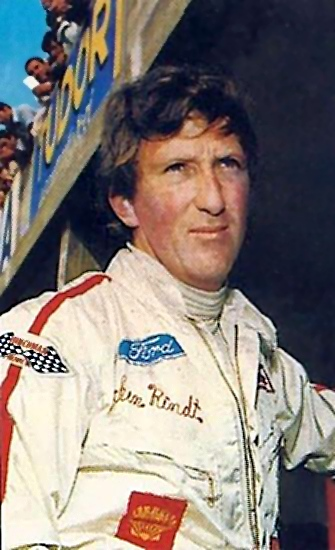
Jochen Rindt (pictured in 1969) won his first and only World Championship posthumously, driving for Lotus-Ford. He suffered a fatal accident during qualifying for the Italian Grand Prix.

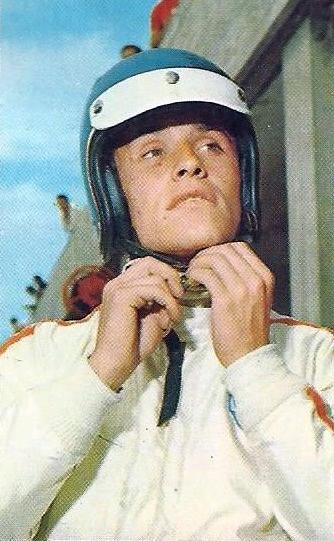
Jacky Ickx (pictured in 1969), driving for Ferrari, finished the season in second, five points behind Rindt.

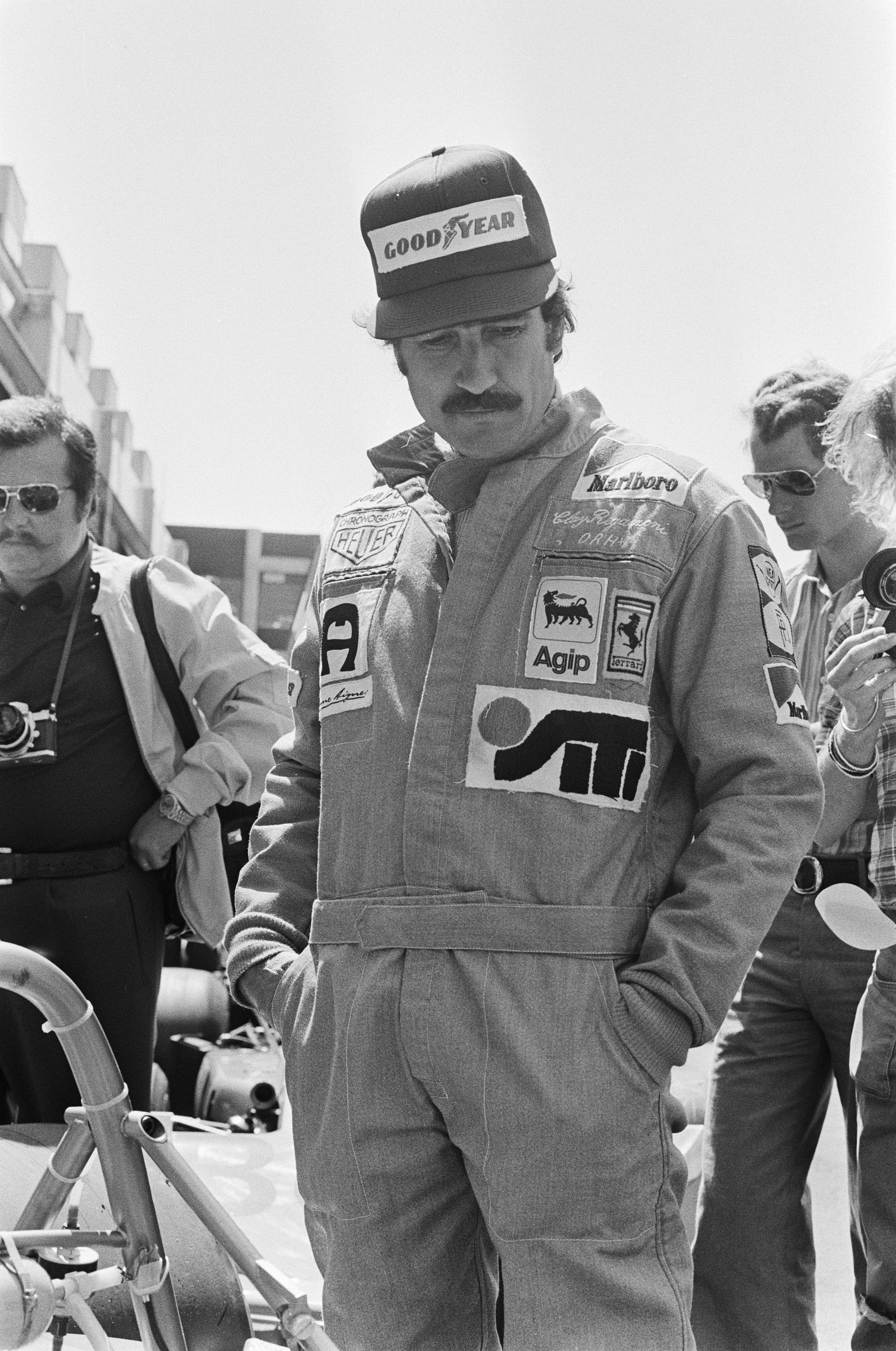
Ickx's teammate Clay Regazzoni (pictured in 1974) finished the season ranked third.

The 1970 Formula One season was the 24th season of the Fédération Internationale de l'Automobile's Formula One motor racing. It featured the 21st World Championship of Drivers, the 13th International Cup for F1 Manufacturers and three non-championship races open to Formula One cars. The World Championship was contested over thirteen races between 7 March and 25 October.

Jochen Rindt, driving for Lotus, won his first Drivers' Championship, although he died during the race weekend at Monza, four races before the end of the season. He had earned enough championship points that no other driver managed to surpass his total. It is the only season to date in which the Drivers' Championship has been awarded posthumously. Jacky Ickx, driving for Ferrari, finished the season strongly but ended up five points short. His teammate Clay Regazzoni placed third, scoring his first win at Monza, but this was not enough for the Maranello-based outfit to overturn the early deficit they had in the Manufacturers' Cup, which Lotus clinched by a 7-point margin.

Bruce McLaren, founder and owner of the famous McLaren team, died on 2 June while testing his McLaren M8D Can-Am car at Goodwood Circuit. Piers Courage, driver for Frank Williams's team, was killed during the Dutch Grand Prix on 21 June.

Three-time World Champion Jack Brabham retired at the end of the year.

== Teams and drivers ==
The following teams and drivers competed in the 1970 World Championship.

Entrant	Constructor	Chassis	Engine	Tyre	Driver	Rounds
(United Kingdom) Tyrrell Racing Organisation	Tyrrell-Ford	001	Ford Cosworth DFV 3.0 V8	D	(United Kingdom) Jackie Stewart	11–13
(United Kingdom) Tyrrell Racing Organisation	March-Ford	701	Ford Cosworth DFV 3.0 V8	D	(United Kingdom) Jackie Stewart	1–10
(United Kingdom) Tyrrell Racing Organisation	March-Ford	701	Ford Cosworth DFV 3.0 V8	D	(France) Johnny Servoz-Gavin	1–3
(United Kingdom) Tyrrell Racing Organisation	March-Ford	701	Ford Cosworth DFV 3.0 V8	D	(France) François Cevert	5–13
(France) Équipe Matra Elf	Matra	MS120	Matra MS12 3.0 V12	G	(France) Jean-Pierre Beltoise	All
(France) Équipe Matra Elf	Matra	MS120	Matra MS12 3.0 V12	G	(France) Henri Pescarolo	All
(United Kingdom) Bruce McLaren Motor Racing	McLaren-Ford	M14A	Ford Cosworth DFV 3.0 V8	G	(New Zealand) Bruce McLaren	1–3
(United Kingdom) Bruce McLaren Motor Racing	McLaren-Ford	M14A	Ford Cosworth DFV 3.0 V8	G	(New Zealand) Denny Hulme	1–3, 6–13
(United Kingdom) Bruce McLaren Motor Racing	McLaren-Ford	M14A	Ford Cosworth DFV 3.0 V8	G	(United Kingdom) Peter Gethin	5, 8–13
(United Kingdom) Bruce McLaren Motor Racing	McLaren-Ford	M14A	Ford Cosworth DFV 3.0 V8	G	(United States) Dan Gurney	5–7
(United Kingdom) Bruce McLaren Motor Racing	McLaren-Alfa Romeo	M7D; M14D	Alfa Romeo T33 3.0 V8	G	(Italy) Andrea de Adamich	2–3, 5–12
(United Kingdom) Bruce McLaren Motor Racing	McLaren-Alfa Romeo	M7D; M14D	Alfa Romeo T33 3.0 V8	G	(Italy) Nanni Galli	10
(United Kingdom) Team Surtees	McLaren-Ford	M7C	Ford Cosworth DFV 3.0 V8	F	(United Kingdom) John Surtees	1–3, 5
(United Kingdom) Team Surtees	Surtees-Ford	TS7	Ford Cosworth DFV 3.0 V8	F	(United Kingdom) John Surtees	7–13
(United Kingdom) Team Surtees	Surtees-Ford	TS7	Ford Cosworth DFV 3.0 V8	F	(United Kingdom) Derek Bell	12
(United States) STP Corporation	March-Ford	701	Ford Cosworth DFV 3.0 V8	F	(United States) Mario Andretti	1–2, 7–9
(United Kingdom) Gold Leaf Team Lotus (United Kingdom) Garvey Team Lotus (United Kingdom) World Wide Racing	Lotus-Ford	49C; 72B; 72C	Ford Cosworth DFV 3.0 V8	F	(Austria) Jochen Rindt	1–10
(United Kingdom) Gold Leaf Team Lotus (United Kingdom) Garvey Team Lotus (United Kingdom) World Wide Racing	Lotus-Ford	49C; 72B; 72C	Ford Cosworth DFV 3.0 V8	F	(United Kingdom) John Miles	1–10
(United Kingdom) Gold Leaf Team Lotus (United Kingdom) Garvey Team Lotus (United Kingdom) World Wide Racing	Lotus-Ford	49C; 72B; 72C	Ford Cosworth DFV 3.0 V8	F	(Spain) Alex Soler-Roig	2, 4, 6
(United Kingdom) Gold Leaf Team Lotus (United Kingdom) Garvey Team Lotus (United Kingdom) World Wide Racing	Lotus-Ford	49C; 72B; 72C	Ford Cosworth DFV 3.0 V8	F	(Brazil) Emerson Fittipaldi	7–10, 12–13
(United Kingdom) Gold Leaf Team Lotus (United Kingdom) Garvey Team Lotus (United Kingdom) World Wide Racing	Lotus-Ford	49C; 72B; 72C	Ford Cosworth DFV 3.0 V8	F	(Sweden) Reine Wisell	12–13
(United Kingdom) Rob Walker Racing Team (United Kingdom) Brooke Bond Oxo Racing with Rob Walker	Lotus-Ford	49C; 72C	Ford Cosworth DFV 3.0 V8	F	(United Kingdom) Graham Hill	1–8, 10–13
(United Kingdom) Motor Racing Developments (United Kingdom) Auto Motor und Sport	Brabham-Ford	BT33	Ford Cosworth DFV 3.0 V8	G	(Australia) Jack Brabham	All
(United Kingdom) Motor Racing Developments (United Kingdom) Auto Motor und Sport	Brabham-Ford	BT33	Ford Cosworth DFV 3.0 V8	G	(West Germany) Rolf Stommelen	All
(United Kingdom) March Engineering	March-Ford	701	Ford Cosworth DFV 3.0 V8	F	(New Zealand) Chris Amon	All
(United Kingdom) March Engineering	March-Ford	701	Ford Cosworth DFV 3.0 V8	F	(Switzerland) Jo Siffert	All
(Italy) Scuderia Ferrari SpA SEFAC	Ferrari	312B	Ferrari 001 3.0 F12	F	(Belgium) Jacky Ickx	All
(Italy) Scuderia Ferrari SpA SEFAC	Ferrari	312B	Ferrari 001 3.0 F12	F	(Italy) Ignazio Giunti	4, 6, 9–10
(Italy) Scuderia Ferrari SpA SEFAC	Ferrari	312B	Ferrari 001 3.0 F12	F	(Switzerland) Clay Regazzoni	5, 7–13
(United Kingdom) Owen Racing Organisation (United Kingdom) Yardley Team BRM	BRM	P153; P139	BRM P142 3.0 V12	D	(United Kingdom) Jackie Oliver	All
(United Kingdom) Owen Racing Organisation (United Kingdom) Yardley Team BRM	BRM	P153; P139	BRM P142 3.0 V12	D	(Mexico) Pedro Rodríguez	All
(United Kingdom) Owen Racing Organisation (United Kingdom) Yardley Team BRM	BRM	P153; P139	BRM P142 3.0 V12	D	(Canada) George Eaton	1–3, 5–7, 9–12
(United Kingdom) Owen Racing Organisation (United Kingdom) Yardley Team BRM	BRM	P153; P139	BRM P142 3.0 V12	D	(United Kingdom) Peter Westbury	12
(United Kingdom) Frank Williams Racing Cars	De Tomaso-Ford	505/38	Ford Cosworth DFV 3.0 V8	D	(United Kingdom) Piers Courage	1–5
(United Kingdom) Frank Williams Racing Cars	De Tomaso-Ford	505/38	Ford Cosworth DFV 3.0 V8	D	(United Kingdom) Brian Redman	7–8
(United Kingdom) Frank Williams Racing Cars	De Tomaso-Ford	505/38	Ford Cosworth DFV 3.0 V8	D	(Australia) Tim Schenken	9–12
(South Africa) Team Gunston	Lotus-Ford	49	Ford Cosworth DFV 3.0 V8	D	(Rhodesia) John Love	1
(South Africa) Team Gunston	Brabham-Ford	BT26A	Ford Cosworth DFV 3.0 V8	G	(South Africa) Peter de Klerk	1
(South Africa) Scuderia Scribante	Lotus-Ford	49C	Ford Cosworth DFV 3.0 V8	F	(South Africa) Dave Charlton	1
(United Kingdom) Antique Automobiles Racing Team (United Kingdom) Colin Crabbe Racing	March-Ford	701	Ford Cosworth DFV 3.0 V8	G	(Sweden) Ronnie Peterson	3–8, 10–12
(United Kingdom) Tom Wheatcroft Racing	Brabham-Ford	BT26A	Ford Cosworth DFV 3.0 V8	G	(United Kingdom) Derek Bell	4
(Switzerland) Silvio Moser Racing Team	Bellasi-Ford	F1 70	Ford Cosworth DFV 3.0 V8	G	(Switzerland) Silvio Moser	5–6, 8–10
(United States) Pete Lovely Volkswagen Inc.	Lotus-Ford	49B	Ford Cosworth DFV 3.0 V8	F	(United States) Pete Lovely	5–7, 12
(West Germany) Hubert Hahne	March-Ford	701	Ford Cosworth DFV 3.0 V8	F	(West Germany) Hubert Hahne	8
(Switzerland) Ecurie Bonnier	McLaren-Ford	M7C	Ford Cosworth DFV 3.0 V8	G	(Sweden) Jo Bonnier	10, 12
(United States) Gus Hutchison	Brabham-Ford	BT26A	Ford Cosworth DFV 3.0 V8	G	(United States) Gus Hutchison	12

=== Team and driver changes ===
- Matra had split with Ken Tyrrell and entered the season under French licence. The MS120 was powered by Matra's own V12 engine. Tyrrell entered two Cosworth-provided March 701's, before introducing the Tyrrell 001 later in the year, the first chassis designed by the Tyrrell team. Reigning champion Jackie Stewart and his 1969 teammate Johnny Servoz-Gavin both moved to Tyrrell, while their third teammate Jean-Pierre Beltoise stayed with Matra. He was joined by Henri Pescarolo, for his first full-time drive.
- 1968 champion Graham Hill was moved out of Team Lotus by team boss Colin Chapman and placed at the Rob Walker Racing Team. Walker's 1969 driver Jo Siffert found a new home at March. There he was joined by Chris Amon, who had left Ferrari half-way through last season, disappointed by the performance of their engine.
- 1969 runner-up Jacky Ickx returned to Ferrari, having spent one year at Brabham. Ferrari's switch from a V12 to a flat-12 engine gave the Belgian hopes of new success. His place at Brabham was taken up by debutant Rolf Stommelen. Ex-Ferrari driver Pedro Rodríguez was signed by BRM.
- 1964 champion John Surtees had driven for BRM in 1969, but left to set up his own team. He entered and drove a McLaren M7C before debuting his self-designed Surtees TS7 half-way through the year.
- Andrea de Adamich, sports car driver for Alfa Romeo, was signed by McLaren to drive a third car powered by an Alfa Romeo V8.
- Frank Williams had run a privatised Brabham BT26C in 1969, but collaborated with Italian car manufacturer De Tomaso. This resulted in the De Tomaso 505/38, which was uncompetitive and never managed to be classified in a championship race.

==== Mid-season changes ====
- Tyrrell driver Johnny Servoz-Gavin retired from the sport three races into the 1970 season. His seat was taken up by François Cevert.
- After the death of Bruce McLaren, new team leader Teddy Mayer signed British driver Peter Gethin. Veteran Dan Gurney also drove three races for the McLaren team.
- Ferrari expanded their operations from one to three cars, promoting their successful sports car driver Ignazio Giunti and hiring Clay Regazzoni. The Swiss would also continue to drive in Formula Two and would go on to win the F2 championship.
- Piers Courage was killed in the Dutch Grand Prix. Frank Williams hired Brian Redman and then Tim Schenken.
- John Miles quit the sport after Jochen Rindt's accident. Besides everything, this left Lotus team owner Colin Chapman without drivers. He hired Emerson Fittipaldi, at the time a promising F2 driver, and Reine Wisell, another debutant but with wide experience under his belt.

== Calendar ==
Round	Grand Prix	Circuit	Date
1	South African Grand Prix	(South Africa) Kyalami Grand Prix Circuit, Midrand	7 March
2	Spanish Grand Prix	(Spain) Circuito Permanente del Jarama, Madrid	19 April
3	Monaco Grand Prix	Circuit de Monaco, Monte Carlo	10 May
4	Belgian Grand Prix	(Belgium) Circuit de Spa-Francorchamps, Stavelot	7 June
5	Dutch Grand Prix	(Netherlands) Circuit Park Zandvoort, Zandvoort	21 June
6	French Grand Prix	(France) Circuit de Charade, Clermont-Ferrand	5 July
7	British Grand Prix	(United Kingdom) Brands Hatch, West Kingsdown	18 July
8	German Grand Prix	(West Germany) Hockenheimring, Hockenheim (Note: The German Grand Prix was originally to be held at the Nürburgring but the drivers refused to race at the venue unless major safety changes were made to it. The Nurburgring track officials responded negatively to a list of changes requested by the drivers. The Hockenheimring would host the race in 1970 on its intended date.)	2 August
9	Austrian Grand Prix	(Austria) Österreichring, Spielberg	16 August
10	Italian Grand Prix	(Italy) Autodromo Nazionale di Monza, Monza	6 September
11	Canadian Grand Prix	(Canada) Circuit Mont-Tremblant, Mont-Tremblant	20 September
12	United States Grand Prix	(United States) Watkins Glen International, New York	4 October
13	Mexican Grand Prix	Autódromo Magdalena Mixhuca, Mexico City	25 October

=== Calendar changes ===
- The Belgian Grand Prix returned after major safety changes had been made to Circuit de Spa-Francorchamps. Drivers had boycotted the 1969 race because of the extreme dangers.
- After a one-off Austrian Grand Prix in 1964, the event returned to the calendar and was held at the newly built Österreichring.
- The Spanish Grand Prix was moved from Montjuïc to Jarama, in keeping with the event-sharing arrangement between the two circuits. Likewise, the British Grand Prix was moved from Silverstone to Brands Hatch and the Canadian Grand Prix was moved from Mosport Park to Circuit Mont-Tremblant.
- The German Grand Prix was originally to be held at the Nürburgring but the drivers refused to race unless major safety changes were made to it. The circuit's owners responded negatively to a list of changes requested by the drivers, so the Hockenheimring was found as host for the race in 1970.

== Regulation changes ==
=== Technical regulations ===
- A "safety bladder" was introduced around the fuel tanks to reduce the risk of fires.
- The maximum displacement for compressed engines, turbo engines for example, was reduced from 1,500 cc (92 cu in) to 500 cc (31 cu in). The maximum displacement for naturally aspirated engines remained at 3,000 cc (180 cu in).
- The minimum weight was raised from 500 kg (1,100 lb) to 530 kg (1,170 lb).

=== Sporting and event regulations ===
The starting order of the race would usually be decided by the drivers' fastest time during any of the practice sessions. However, in some cases, only ten "chosen" drivers would be guaranteed a place on the grid, in the order of their best time. The remaining drivers had to earn their entry in a 30-minute qualifying session: the fastest drivers in that session would be allowed to start the race and would be placed on the grid in the order of their original best practice time. This resulted in drivers not qualifying for a race despite going faster in practice than others who did qualify. This system was introduced shortly before the second race of the season, leading to protests among teams and drivers.

Drivers would have to complete at least five laps in practice to be allowed to race. (Note: It is unclear if this rule existed before this year.)

The FIA published some considerations on circuit design and announced that all circuits would have to pass their inspections:

- Run-off areas should be at least 3 m (9.8 ft) wide.
- Double guardrails were now the standard. The use of strawbales was banned.
- Spectators placed at least 3 m (9.8 ft) behind the fencing.
- The pit lane should be separated from the track by a barrier.
- Furthermore, regulations were set on track width, track surface and maximum gradient change.

== Championship report ==
=== Rounds 1 to 5 ===
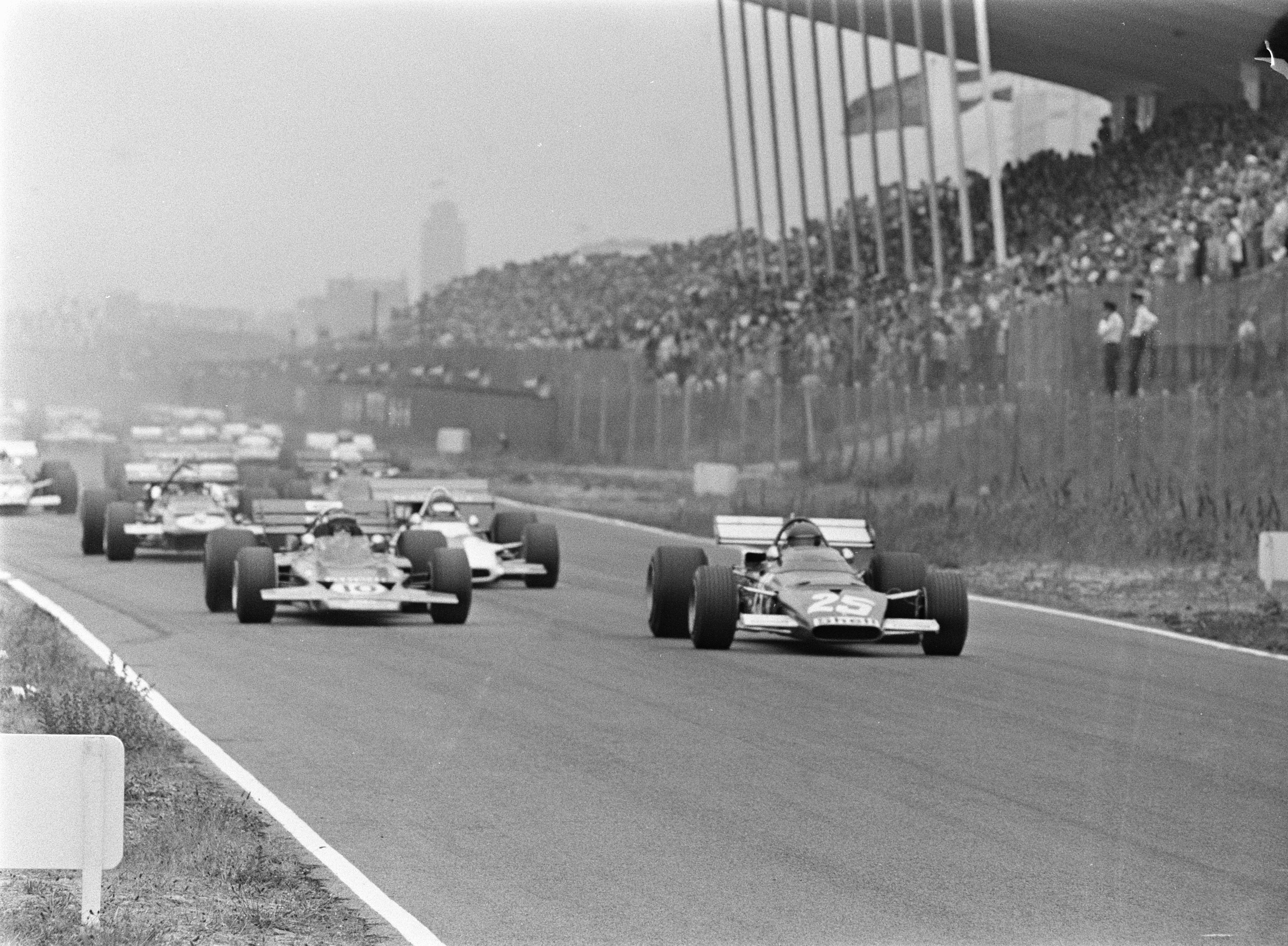
Start of the Dutch Grand Prix

As it had been since 1967, the championship commenced in South Africa. Reigning champion Jackie Stewart, driving a privatised March 701 for Tyrrell Racing, set the fastest lap, before Chris Amon, driving the same car but for the March works team, set the exact same time, a 1:19.3. Three-time World Champion Jack Brabham joined them on the first row. At the start, Stewart and Brabham had the best initial start, until Jochen Rindt, who started in fourth, made a charge round the outside of the first corner. But he hit the front of Amon's car and then crashed into Brabham. Stewart was the only frontrunner unharmed and was now leading Jacky Ickx and Jackie Oliver, who started fifth and twelfth, respectively. By lap 6, however, Brabham was back into second place, and the McLarens of Denny Hulme and Bruce McLaren were third and fourth. Brabham took the lead on lap 20, Hulme went past Stewart on lap 38 into second, and it was only thanks to Bruce McLaren's engine failure that the Scot finished on the podium.

During the weekend of the Spanish Grand Prix, the organisers of the event, backed by the Commission Sportive Internationale (currently known as the FIA), had a falling out with a large number of teams and drivers, represented by the F1CA (later known as FOCA). The organisers had suddenly decided to allow just 16 starters for the race, and, only after all practice and qualifying sessions were run, decided to discount any lap time set on Friday. Under pressure of the protesting teams, they reverted their decision on the morning of the race and all 22 entered cars were rolled onto the grid, until the CSI forced them to uphold it and saw to it that the six slowest qualifiers, based on the Saturday qualifying times alone, were removed. The first row on the grid was filled by Jack Brabham (Brabham), Denny Hulme (McLaren) and Jackie Stewart (March). At the start, Jacky Ickx and Jackie Oliver came together and both cars were engulfed in flames. Another nine drivers retired during the race with mechanical issues, which meant only five were left at the finish. Stewart won ahead of Bruce McLaren and Mario Andretti, the American's first podium. Stewart's victory would be the last for any "private" (non-works) team.

In Monaco, the same qualifying rules were implemented, resulting in six cars not qualifying for the race, although none of them were slowest in practice. Championship leader Stewart started on pole position, with Amon next to him. Hulme and Brabham started on the second row. Bruce McLaren retired on lap 19, when he hit the wall going through the fast chicane after the tunnel. On lap 22, Brabham finally managed to pass Amon, and when Stewart's Cosworth engine started misfiring badly, he acquired the lead of the race. With three quarters of the race, Amon crashed out with a broken rear suspension and Hulme fell back with gearbox issues. This gave Jochen Rindt a surprising chance for a podium finish and the inspired Austrian actually came within a few car lengths of Brabham. On the last corner of the last lap, the Australian took a different line than usual to prevent any chance of an overtake, but he locked his wheels and slid straight on into the barrier. Rindt swooped by, setting a new lap record and taking the victory for the second time in his career. Brabham dragged his damaged car over the line, ahead of Henri Pescarolo in the Matra, scoring his first podium.

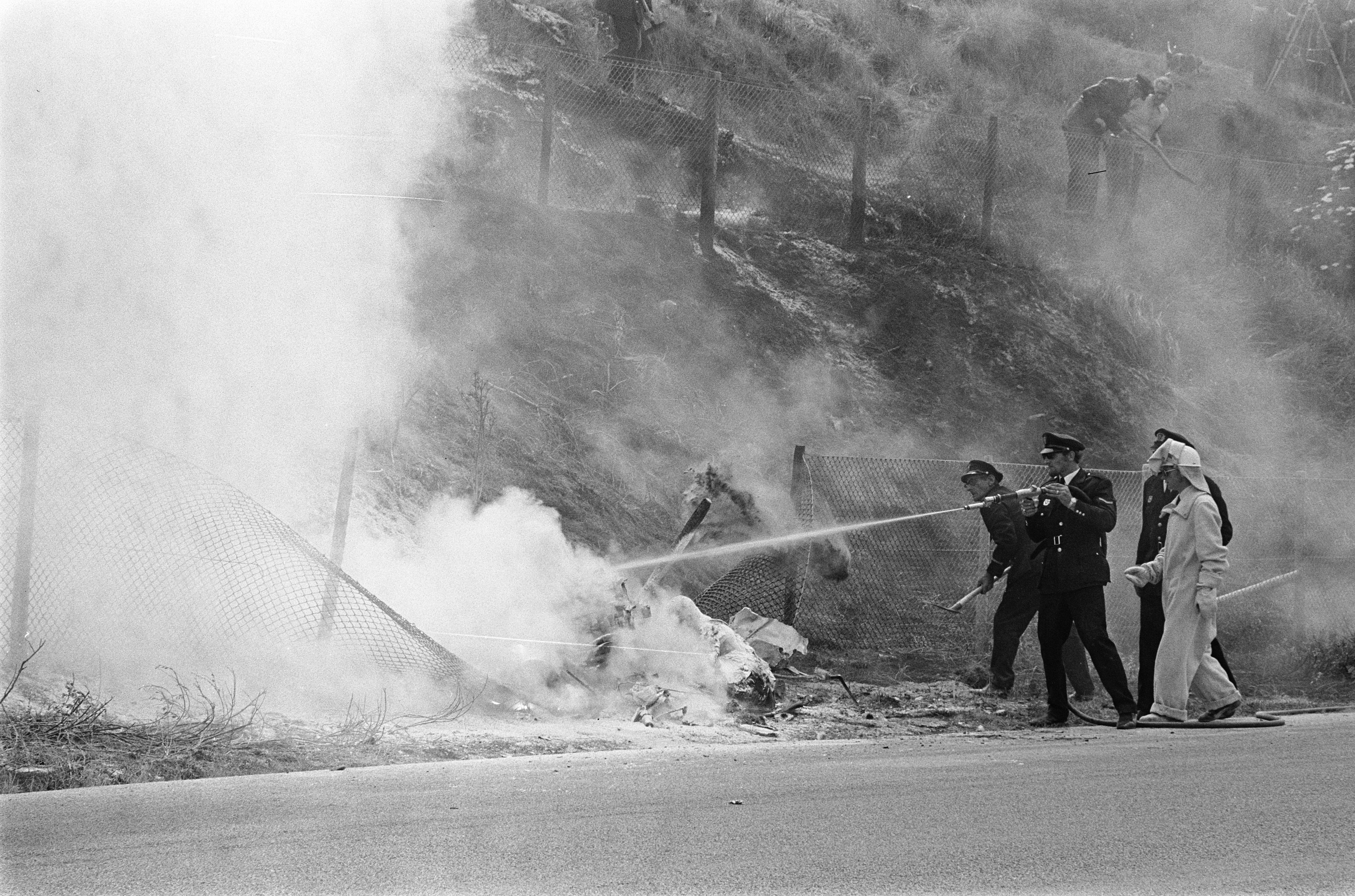
The burning wreck of Piers Courage being extinguished

After the death of founder and owner Bruce McLaren, the McLaren team withdrew their cars for the Belgian Grand Prix. The Circuit de Spa-Francorchamps had received an upgrade in safety measures: Armco barriers lined around the track and a slow chicane at Malmedy. Unlike in the last two races, practice times were used to determine the order of the grid and it was Stewart again on pole, with Rindt and Amon next to him. Rindt was first at the start, but it was Stewart and Amon fighting for the lead during the opening laps. Pedro Rodríguez started sixth but had passed everyone in front of him by lap 5, the BRM V12 engine reaching nearly 300 km/h (190 mph) on the straights, but Amon kept the pressure on him, setting a new lap record, even with the added chicane. Half-way through the race, Stewart's engine let go, before Hill and Brabham suffered mechanical issues as well. Rodríguez had his second career win, just over a second clear of Amon. Jean-Pierre Beltoise finished third, and with two other V12-powered cars in the points, the Belgian high-speed roads had brought a stop to the V8 monopoly.

Lotus introduced their wedge-shaped Lotus 72 for the Dutch Grand Prix, incorporating revolutionary brake and suspension design. It provided better vision and ventilation to the driver besides the overall advancement in grip and ride. Rindt comfortably qualified on pole position, with Stewart and Ickx next to him. The Belgian driver forced his Ferrari into the lead ahead of Rindt, while Stewart fell to fourth. Going into lap 3, however, Rindt passed Ickx with ease, going round the outside at Tarzan corner. The Austrian would finish 30 seconds ahead of Stewart and a lap ahead of Ickx in third place. The race was marred by the fatal accident of Piers Courage.

In the Drivers' Championship, Jackie Stewart led with 19 points, ahead of Jochen Rindt with 18 and Jack Brabham with 15. Their respective constructors filled the Manufacturers' Cup standings in the same order: March led with 25 points, ahead of Lotus with 23 and Brabham with 17.

=== Rounds 6 to 9 ===
Jochen Rindt in his new Lotus 72 was favourite for the French Grand Prix, but he was suffering from a stomach ulcer and the twisty nature of the track brought on heavy sickness. To add to the misery, in practice, a stone was thrown up by a car in front, hitting his face and cutting his right cheek deeply. After qualifying, it seemed that, like in Spa, the V12-powered cars would be dominant: Jacky Ickx put his Ferrari on pole position, ahead of Jean-Pierre Beltoise in the Matra. And in the opening laps, only championship leader Jackie Stewart was able to keep up with those two. On lap 16, however, Ickx's engine was misfiring and he had to retire. When Stewart pitted with engine issues as well, Rindt was in second place and promptly set a new fastest lap. When Beltoise suffered a slow rear puncture, hopes of an all-French win in France were shattered and Rindt took the win, ahead of Chris Amon and Jack Brabham, and took the lead in the Drivers' standings.

For the British Grand Prix, Rindt was again favourite, but his Firestone tyres were not working perfectly in the high summer temperatures. Brabham, using Goodyear tyres, managed to equal Rindt's time in practice. Ickx completed the front row. Stewart started down in eighth, his March not liking the bumpy off-camber track of Brands Hatch. At the start, Brabham took the lead but was quickly passed by Ickx. The Ferrari was quick until its differential broke on lap 7. Ickx slowed down, Brabham's entry to Paddock Bend was hampered and Rindt seized the chance to pass them both. Rindt and Brabham were inseparable for the next 60 laps, until the Austrian missed a gear and the Australian outbraked him into South Bank corner. Brabham led away, growing his advantage to 13 seconds in the last lap, but then dramatically running out of fuel. Rindt crossed the line first, extending his lead in the championship, and Brabham coasted home in second. Denny Hulme was third for McLaren. After the race, Rindt was disqualified for running an illegally high rear wing, but team boss Colin Chapman successfully appealed and the decision was reverted.

The German Grand Prix was planned to be held at the Nürburgring Nordschleife, but in light of the deaths of Bruce McLaren and Piers Courage, the drivers asked the FIA to find a safer circuit. This led to the first Grand Prix at the Hockenheimring, which had already been fitted with Armco barriers all around. The track's whose long straights gave the advantage to the V12-powered cars, whereas the Cosworth V8s suffered from attrition. Jacky Ickx started on pole in his Ferrari, with championship leader Jochen Rindt and teammate Clay Regazzoni next to him. Rindt's main rival Jack Brabham could only manage a twelfth starting position and when his engine suffered an oil leak, he was already out of the race after four laps. Ickx and Rindt engaged in a race-long battle, the Austrian eventually taking his fourth win in a row. Denny Hulme was third, again, while Jackie Stewart retired with engine troubles before the half-way point.

Ferrari's hopes for a resurgence came true during the Austrian Grand Prix. The first race at the new Österreichring saw Jochen Rindt take pole position, but he was closely followed by both Regazzoni and Ickx. Ignazio Giunti in the third Ferrari started fifth. Brabham had another miserable qualifying: he started in eighth. Rindt lost out at the start, dropping to third, and Ickx was waved through by his teammate in a tactical play. François Cevert's Tyrrell lost oil and in the melee, Rindt dropped to seventh place. He tried to fight back, but on lap 21, his Cosworth engine broke and all danger to Ferrari was over. The pair in red finished the race in formation and lapped the whole field except third-placed Rolf Stommelen.

In the Drivers' Championship, Jochen Rindt's retirement had not made a big dent in his lead, yet. He stood on 45 points, ahead of Jack Brabham with 25 and Denny Hulme with 20. In the battle for the Manufacturers' Cup, Lotus, unsurprisingly, was in the lead with 50 points, ahead of March and Brabham with 33.

=== Rounds 10 to 13 ===
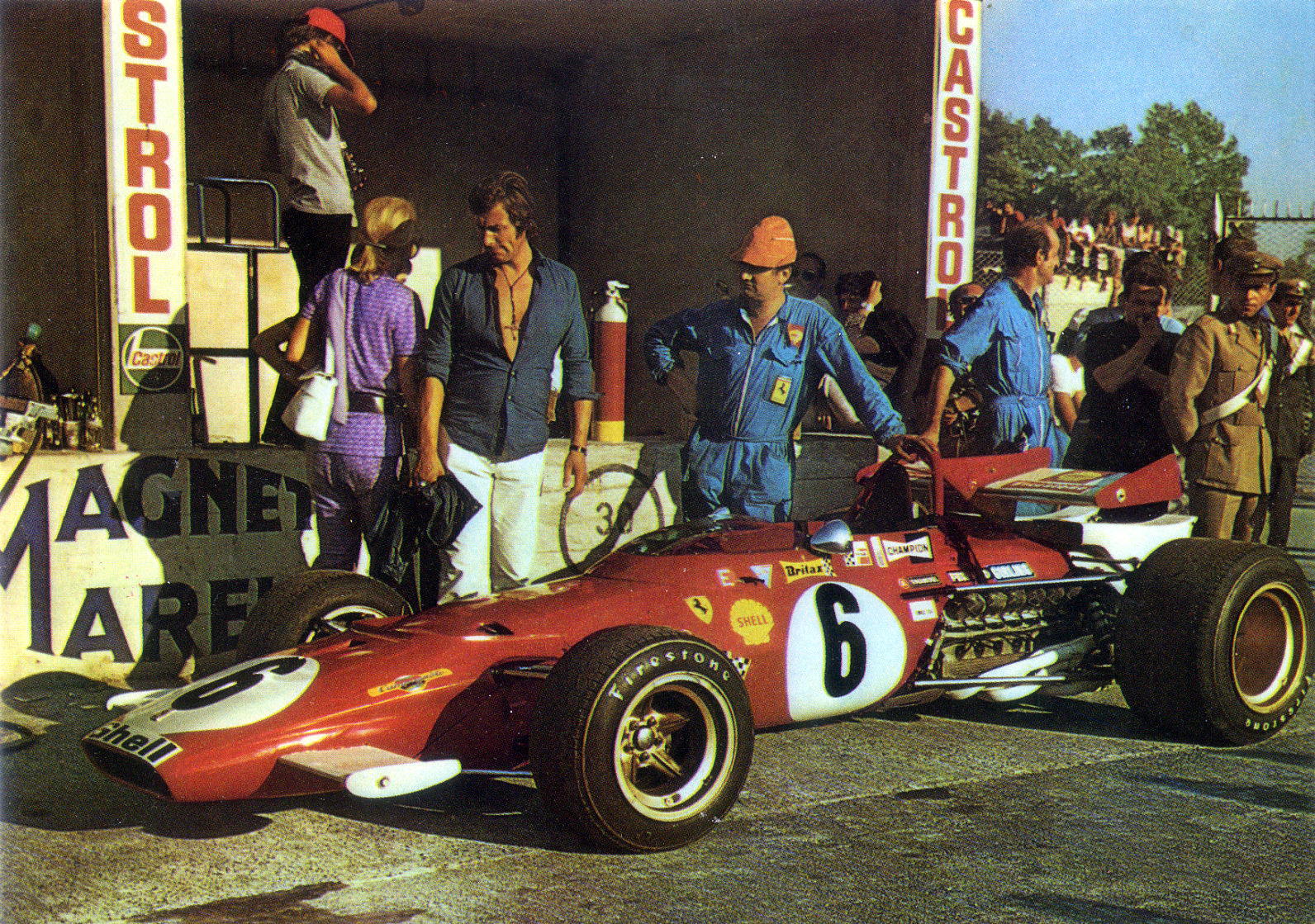
Ignazio Giunti's Ferrari in the pits at Monza

With the Scuderia Ferrari coming off a dominant victory in Austria, the tifosi were praying for a repeat during the Italian Grand Prix. Main rivals March and Lotus had prepared their cars for the long straights of Monza by stripping them from any spoilers and such. It allowed them to reach top speeds of over 300 km/h (190 mph) but made them quite unstable in the corners, which Emerson Fittipaldi found out during practice: he crashed going into the Parabolica, escaped unhurt, but gave his Lotus mechanics a big repair job. Championship leader Jochen Rindt crashed at the same place on Saturday and the Austrian was killed: he was only wearing a seat belt around his waist and, in the impact, slid underneath it, all the way down until the belt slit his throat. Upon hearing the news, the Lotus team packed up their operations and withdrew from the race. With the wreck cleared, normal proceedings resumed, albeit in a very different atmosphere. Jacky Ickx qualified on pole position for Ferrari, ahead of Pedro Rodríguez (British Racing Motors|BRM), Clay Regazzoni (Ferrari) and Jackie Stewart (Tyrrell-March). Ickx fell back to seventh place, but the other three put up a brilliant fight for the lead, switching positions almost every lap. Rodríguez retired when his engine exploded, but his teammate Jackie Oliver joined the battle. Spurred on by the promise that a part of the prize money would be awarded to the driver in the lead at laps 17, 34 and 51, several drivers joined the tactical slipstreaming fight. In the end, Regazzoni managed to win the race, ahead of a group of four drivers finishing within three quarters of a second. Jackie Stewart and Jean-Pierre Beltoise completed the podium. François Cevert, the only other driver to not get lapped, encountered a sea of fans on the track when he finished a minute later.

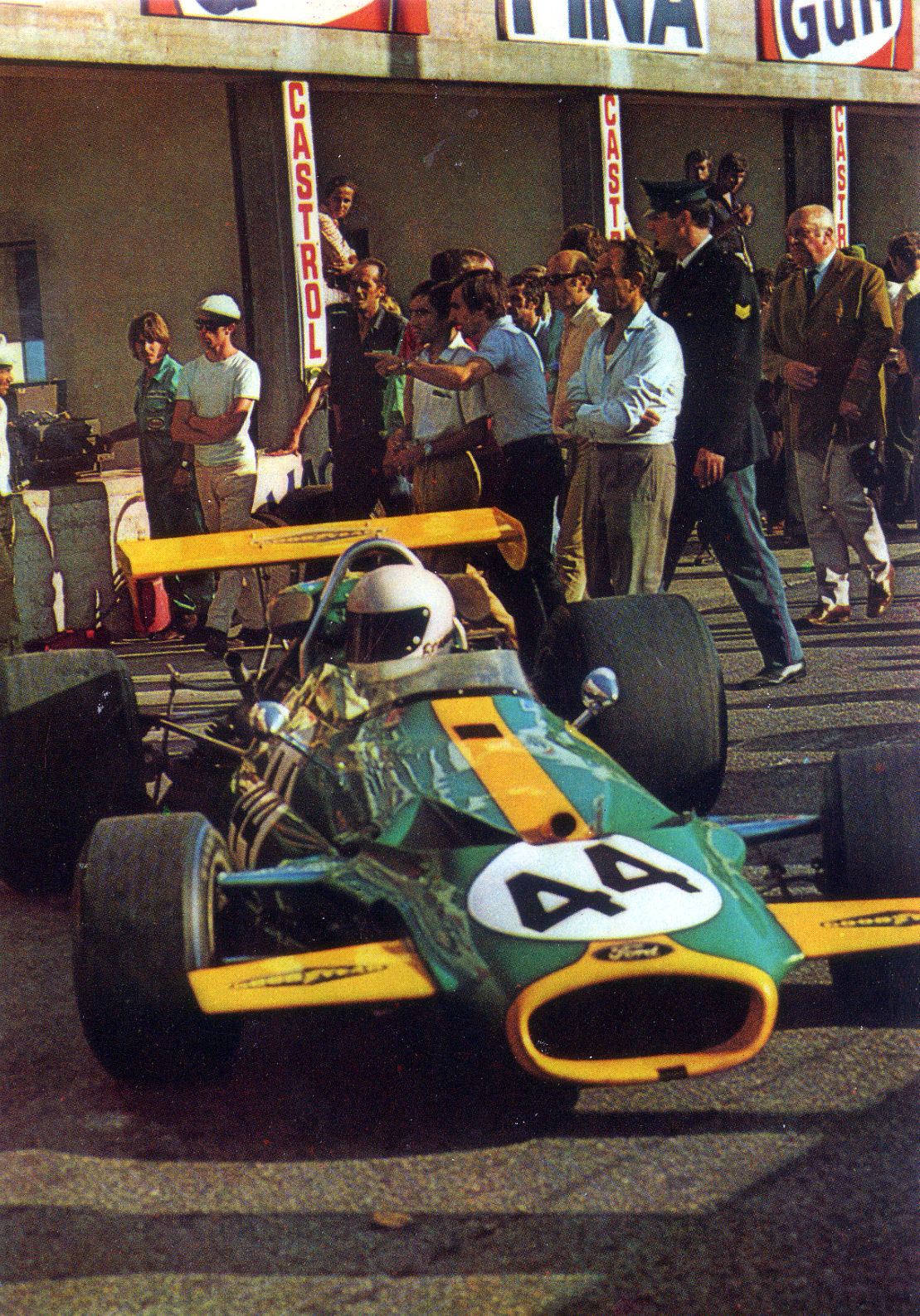
Jack Brabham leaving the pits at Monza

The championship concluded with three races in North America, starting with the Canadian Grand Prix at the spectacular Circuit Mont-Tremblant. The Lotus team had decided not to participate, while Tyrrell revealed their first self-designed chassis: the 001. Jackie Stewart immediately snatched pole position, going four tenths faster than in his March, ahead of the Ferrari pair of Ickx and Regazzoni. In the race, Stewart established a comfortable lead, until on lap 32, his left front suspension collapsed and he retired. Ickx and Regazzoni moved up to take a 1-2 finish, ahead of Chris Amon in the March.

For the United States Grand Prix, Ickx qualified on pole position, ahead of Stewart and Fittipaldi, the leading Lotus driver after Rindt's demise. Ickx needed to win the two remaining races to stand a chance of overtaking Rindt's points total, but at the start, he fell back to third. On lap 16, he overtook Rodríguez for second, but around half distance, had to make a pit stop to repair a fuel leak. Stewart then retired with an oil leak, and Rodríguez had to pit for extra fuel. This left the Lotus pair of Fittipaldi and Wisell in the lead. Rodríguez eventually recovered to second, while Ickx could manage more than fourth place. Jochen Rindt was awarded the Drivers' Championship posthumously.

For the Mexican Grand Prix, Clay Regazzoni qualified on pole, ahead of the three "Jacks": Stewart, Ickx and Brabham. The race was delayed over an hour, because over 200,000 supporters had turned up and were lined up right along the track to get the best view. The drivers pleaded with the crowd to move back and eventually agreed to start the race. When they got underway, Ickx quickly seized the lead. Stewart had to pit due to a loose steering column but he was fighting back to the front until, on lap 33, he hit a stray dog and heavily damaged his front suspension. Ferrari scored their third 1-2 finish, ahead of Denny Hulme in the McLaren.

Jochen Rindt was awarded the Drivers' Championship posthumously, the only time this has ever happened, with 45 points, ahead of the Ferrari drivers Jacky Ickx (40) and Clay Regazzoni (33). Lotus were awarded the Manufacturers' Cup with 59 points, ahead of Ferrari (52) and March (48).

== Results and standings ==
=== Grands Prix ===
Round	Grand Prix	Pole position	Fastest lap	Winning driver	Winning constructor	Tyre	Report
1	(South Africa) South African Grand Prix	(United Kingdom) Jackie Stewart	(Australia) Jack Brabham	(Australia) Jack Brabham	(United Kingdom) Brabham-Ford	G	Report
2	(Spain) Spanish Grand Prix	(Australia) Jack Brabham	(Australia) Jack Brabham	(United Kingdom) Jackie Stewart	(United Kingdom) March-Ford	D	Report
3	Monaco Grand Prix	(United Kingdom) Jackie Stewart	(Austria) Jochen Rindt	(Austria) Jochen Rindt	(United Kingdom) Lotus-Ford	F	Report
4	(Belgium) Belgian Grand Prix	(United Kingdom) Jackie Stewart	(New Zealand) Chris Amon	(Mexico) Pedro Rodríguez	(United Kingdom) BRM	D	Report
5	(Netherlands) Dutch Grand Prix	(Austria) Jochen Rindt	(Belgium) Jacky Ickx	(Austria) Jochen Rindt	(United Kingdom) Lotus-Ford	F	Report
6	(France) French Grand Prix	(Belgium) Jacky Ickx	(Australia) Jack Brabham	(Austria) Jochen Rindt	(United Kingdom) Lotus-Ford	F	Report
7	(United Kingdom) British Grand Prix	(Austria) Jochen Rindt	(Australia) Jack Brabham	(Austria) Jochen Rindt	(United Kingdom) Lotus-Ford	F	Report
8	(West Germany) German Grand Prix	(Belgium) Jacky Ickx	(Belgium) Jacky Ickx	(Austria) Jochen Rindt	(United Kingdom) Lotus-Ford	F	Report
9	(Austria) Austrian Grand Prix	(Austria) Jochen Rindt	(Belgium) Jacky Ickx (Switzerland) Clay Regazzoni	(Belgium) Jacky Ickx	(Italy) Ferrari	F	Report
10	(Italy) Italian Grand Prix	(Belgium) Jacky Ickx	(Switzerland) Clay Regazzoni	(Switzerland) Clay Regazzoni	(Italy) Ferrari	F	Report
11	(Canada) Canadian Grand Prix	(United Kingdom) Jackie Stewart	(Switzerland) Clay Regazzoni	(Belgium) Jacky Ickx	(Italy) Ferrari	F	Report
12	United States Grand Prix	(Belgium) Jacky Ickx	(Belgium) Jacky Ickx	(Brazil) Emerson Fittipaldi	(United Kingdom) Lotus-Ford	F	Report
13	(Mexico) Mexican Grand Prix	(Switzerland) Clay Regazzoni	(Belgium) Jacky Ickx	(Belgium) Jacky Ickx	(Italy) Ferrari	F	Report

=== Scoring system ===
Points were awarded to the top six classified finishers. The International Cup for F1 Manufacturers only counted the points of the highest-finishing driver for each race. For both the Championship and the Cup, the best six results from rounds 1–7 and the best five results from rounds 8–13 were counted.

Numbers without parentheses are championship points; numbers in parentheses are total points scored. Points were awarded in the following system:

Position	1st	2nd	3rd	4th	5th	6th
Race	9	6	4	3	2	1

=== World Drivers' Championship standings ===
Pos.	Driver	RSA (South Africa)	ESP (Spain)	MON (Monaco)	BEL (Belgium)	NED (Netherlands)	FRA (France)	GBR (United Kingdom)	GER (West Germany)	AUT (Austria)	ITA (Italy)	CAN (Canada)	USA (United States)	MEX (Mexico)	Pts.
1	(Austria) Jochen Rindt†	13	Ret	1^{F}	Ret	1^{P}	1	1^{P}	1	Ret^{P}	DNS†				45
2	(Belgium) Jacky Ickx	Ret	Ret	Ret	8	3^{F}	Ret^{P}	Ret	2^{P}^{F}	1^{F}	Ret^{P}	1	4^{P}^{F}	1^{F}	40
3	(Switzerland) Clay Regazzoni					4		4	Ret	2^{F}	1^{F}	2^{F}	13	2^{P}	33
4	(New Zealand) Denny Hulme	2	Ret	4			4	3	3	Ret	4	Ret	7	3	27
5	(United Kingdom) Jackie Stewart	3^{P}	1	Ret^{P}	Ret^{P}	2	9	Ret	Ret	Ret	2	Ret^{P}	Ret	Ret	25
6	(Australia) Jack Brabham	1^{F}	Ret^{P}^{F}	2	Ret	11	3^{F}	2^{F}	Ret	13	Ret	Ret	10	Ret	25
7	(Mexico) Pedro Rodríguez	9	Ret	6	1	10	Ret	Ret	Ret	4	Ret	4	2	6	23
8	(New Zealand) Chris Amon	Ret	Ret	Ret	2^{F}	Ret	2	5	Ret	8	7	3	5	4	23
9	(France) Jean-Pierre Beltoise	4	Ret	Ret	3	5	13	Ret	Ret	6	3	8	Ret	5	16
10	(Brazil) Emerson Fittipaldi							8	4	15	DNS		1	Ret	12
11	(West Germany) Rolf Stommelen	Ret	Ret	DNQ	5	DNQ	7	DNS	5	3	5	Ret	12	Ret	10
12	(France) Henri Pescarolo	7	Ret	3	6	8	5	Ret	6	14	Ret	7	8	9	8
13	(United Kingdom) Graham Hill	6	4	5	Ret	NC	10	6	Ret		DNS	NC	Ret	Ret	7
14	(New Zealand) Bruce McLaren††	Ret	2	Ret											6
15	(Sweden) Reine Wisell												3	NC	4
16	(United States) Mario Andretti	Ret	3					Ret	Ret	Ret					4
17	(Italy) Ignazio Giunti				4		14			7	Ret				3
18	(United Kingdom) John Surtees	Ret	Ret	Ret		6		Ret	9	Ret	Ret	5	Ret	8	3
19	(United Kingdom) John Miles	5	DNQ	DNQ	Ret	7	8	Ret	Ret	Ret	DNS				2
20	(United Kingdom) Jackie Oliver	Ret	Ret	Ret	Ret	Ret	Ret	Ret	Ret	5	Ret	NC	Ret	7	2
21	(France) Johnny Servoz-Gavin	Ret	5	DNQ											2
22	(France) François Cevert					Ret	11	7	7	Ret	6	9	Ret	Ret	1
23	(United Kingdom) Peter Gethin					Ret			Ret	10	NC	6	14	Ret	1
24	(United States) Dan Gurney					Ret	6	Ret							1
25	(United Kingdom) Derek Bell				Ret								6		1
—	(Switzerland) Jo Siffert	10	DNQ	8	7	Ret	Ret	Ret	8	9	Ret	Ret	9	Ret	0
—	(Sweden) Ronnie Peterson			7	NC	9	Ret	9	Ret		Ret	NC	11		0
—	(Italy) Andrea de Adamich		DNQ	DNQ		DNQ	NC	DNS	DNQ	12	8	Ret	DNQ		0
—	(Rhodesia) John Love	8													0
—	(Canada) George Eaton	Ret	DNQ	DNQ		Ret	12	Ret		11	Ret	10	Ret		0
—	(South Africa) Peter de Klerk	11													0
—	(South Africa) Dave Charlton	12													0
—	(United Kingdom) Piers Courage‡	Ret	DNS	NC	Ret	Ret‡									0
—	(Australia) Tim Schenken									Ret	Ret	NC	Ret		0
—	(United States) Pete Lovely					DNQ	DNQ	NC					DNQ		0
—	(Switzerland) Silvio Moser					DNQ	DNQ		DNQ	Ret	DNQ				0
—	(Sweden) Jo Bonnier										DNQ		Ret		0
—	(United States) Gus Hutchison												Ret		0
—	(Spain) Alex Soler-Roig		DNQ		DNS		DNQ								0
—	(United Kingdom) Brian Redman							DNS	DNQ						0
—	(West Germany) Hubert Hahne								DNQ						0
—	(Italy) Nanni Galli										DNQ				0
—	(United Kingdom) Peter Westbury												DNQ		0
Pos.	Driver	RSA (South Africa)	ESP (Spain)	MON (Monaco)	BEL (Belgium)	NED (Netherlands)	FRA (France)	GBR (United Kingdom)	GER (West Germany)	AUT (Austria)	ITA (Italy)	CAN (Canada)	USA (United States)	MEX (Mexico)	Pts.

Key
Colour	Result
Gold	Winner
Silver	Second place
Bronze	Third place
Green	Other points position
Blue	Other classified position
Blue	Not classified, finished (NC)
Purple	Not classified, retired (Ret)
Red	Did not qualify (DNQ)
Black	Disqualified (DSQ)
White	Did not start (DNS)
White	Race cancelled (C)
Blank	Did not practice (DNP)
Blank	Excluded (EX)
Blank	Did not arrive (DNA)
Blank	Withdrawn (WD)
Blank	Did not enter (empty cell)
Annotation	Meaning
P	Pole position
F	Fastest lap

† Jochen Rindt suffered a fatal accident in practice before the Italian Grand Prix
†† Bruce McLaren died during sportscar testing
‡ Piers Courage suffered a fatal accident during the Dutch Grand Prix

=== International Cup for F1 Manufacturers standings ===
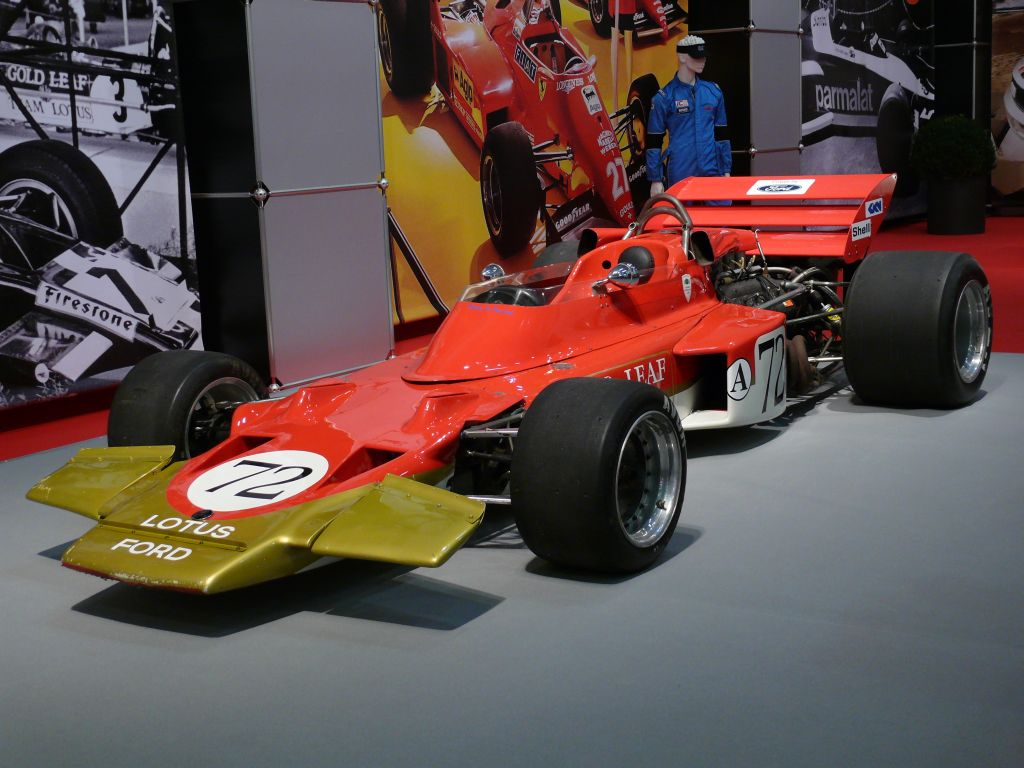
Lotus Ford won the International Cup for Formula 1 Manufacturers

Pos.	Manufacturer	RSA (South Africa)	ESP (Spain)	MON (Monaco)	BEL (Belgium)	NED (Netherlands)	FRA (France)	GBR (United Kingdom)	GER (West Germany)	AUT (Austria)	ITA (Italy)	CAN (Canada)	USA (United States)	MEX (Mexico)	Pts.
1	(United Kingdom) Lotus-Ford	5	4	1	Ret	1	1	1	1	15	DNS	NC	1	NC	59
2	(Italy) Ferrari	Ret	Ret	Ret	4	3	14	4	2	1	1	1	(4)	1	52 (55)
3	(United Kingdom) March-Ford	3	1	7	2	2	2	5	7	8	2	3	5	4	48
4	(United Kingdom) Brabham-Ford	1	Ret	2	5	11	3	2	5	3	5	Ret	10	Ret	35
5	(United Kingdom) McLaren-Ford	2	2	4		6	4	3	3	10	4	6	7	3	35
6	(United Kingdom) BRM	9	Ret	6	1	10	12	Ret	Ret	4	Ret	4	2	6	23
7	(France) Matra	4	Ret	3	3	5	5	Ret	6	6	3	7	8	5	23
8	(United Kingdom) Surtees-Ford							Ret	9	Ret	Ret	5	6	8	3
—	(United Kingdom) McLaren-Alfa Romeo		DNQ	DNQ		DNQ	NC	DNS	DNQ	12	8	Ret	DNQ		0
—	(Italy) De Tomaso-Ford	Ret	DNS	NC	Ret	Ret		DNS	DNQ	Ret	Ret	NC	Ret		0
—	(United Kingdom) Tyrrell-Ford										DNS	Ret	Ret	Ret	0
—	(Switzerland) Bellasi-Ford					DNQ	DNQ		DNQ	Ret	DNQ				0
Pos.	Manufacturer	RSA (South Africa)	ESP (Spain)	MON (Monaco)	BEL (Belgium)	NED (Netherlands)	FRA (France)	GBR (United Kingdom)	GER (West Germany)	AUT (Austria)	ITA (Italy)	CAN (Canada)	USA (United States)	MEX (Mexico)	Pts.

- Bold results counted to championship totals.

== Non-championship races ==
Other Formula One races held in 1970, which did not count towards the World Championship. The International Trophy and Gold Cup were held concurrently with Formula 5000 cars.

Race name	Circuit	Date	Winning driver	Constructor	Report
(United Kingdom) V Race of Champions	Brands Hatch	22 March	(United Kingdom) Jackie Stewart	(United Kingdom) March-Cosworth	Report
(United Kingdom) XXII BRDC International Trophy	Silverstone	26 April	(New Zealand) Chris Amon	(United Kingdom) March-Cosworth	Report
(United Kingdom) XVII International Gold Cup	Oulton Park	22 August	(United Kingdom) John Surtees	(United Kingdom) Surtees-Cosworth	Report
