= De Tomaso =

Italian car manufacturing company

De Tomaso Automobili Ltd.
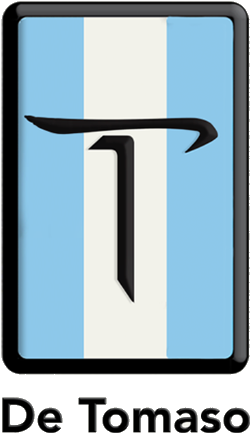
- Formerly: De Tomaso Modena SpA
- Type: Private
- Industry: Automotive
- Founded: 1959; 67 years ago
- Founder: Alejandro de Tomaso
- Fate: Filed for bankruptcy in 2012; Company sold to Ideal Team Ventures in 2014
- Headquarters: Modena, Italy (1959–2004)
- Area served: Worldwide
- Key people: Norman Choi (Chairman)
- Products: Supercars
- Owner: Ideal Team Ventures Limited
- Parent: Ford (1971–1974)
- Subsidiaries: Maserati (1976–1993); Innocenti (1976–1993); Moto Guzzi (1973–2000); Benelli (1972–1995)
- Website: detomaso-automobili.com

De Tomaso Automobili Ltd. (previously known as De Tomaso Modena SpA) is an Italian car-manufacturing company. It was founded in 1959 by the Argentine Alejandro de Tomaso in Modena. It originally produced various sports prototypes and auto racing vehicles, including a Formula One car for Frank Williams Racing Cars in 1970. Most of the automaker's funding came from Amory Haskell Jr.

In 1971, Ford Motor Company acquired an 84 percent stake in De Tomaso, with Alejandro de Tomaso himself holding the balance. Ford sold back their stake in the automaker in 1974. The De Tomaso brand was acquired in 2014 by Hong Kong–based Ideal Team Ventures, and in 2019, the newly formed company presented their first product, a retro-styled sports car called the De Tomaso P72.

== History ==
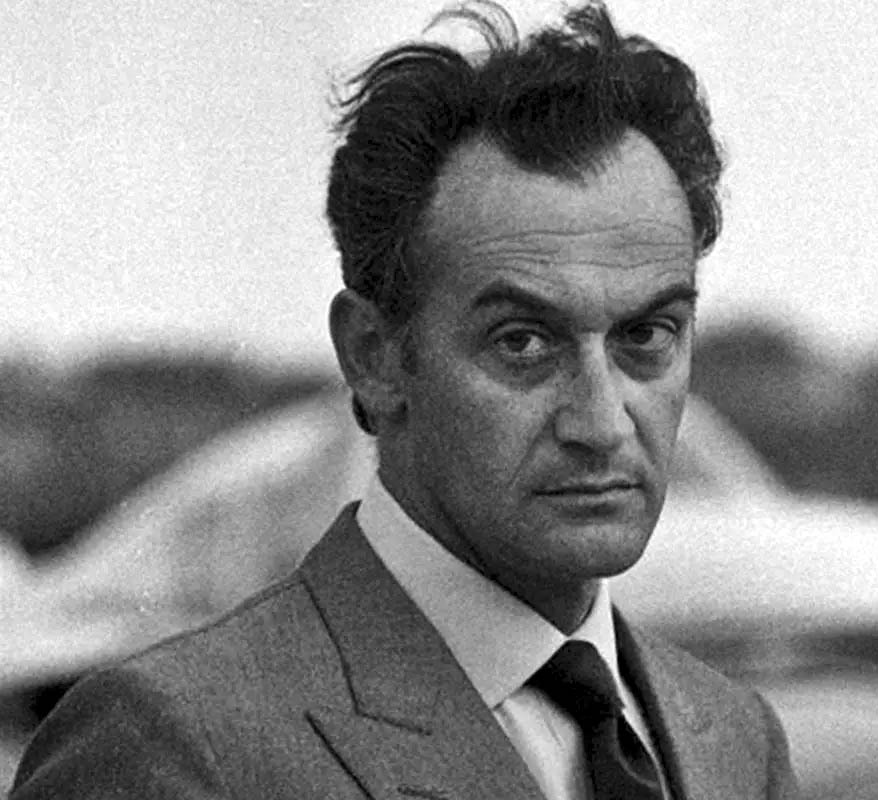
Alejandro de Tomaso, founder

The company went on to develop and produce both sports cars and luxury vehicles, most notably the Ford-powered Italian-bodied Mangusta and Pantera. From 1976 to 1993, De Tomaso owned Italian sports car maker Maserati, and was responsible for producing cars including the Biturbo, the Kyalami, Quattroporte III, Karif and the Chrysler TC. De Tomaso also owned motorcycle company Moto Guzzi from 1973 to 1993.

De Tomaso went into liquidation in 2004, although production of new cars continued after this date. By 2008, a buyer was being sought for the De Tomaso factory and trademarks, per the court-appointed liquidators. In 2009, Gian Mario Rossignolo bought the De Tomaso trademark and founded a new company named "De Tomaso Automobili SpA". Rossignolo planned to assemble chassis and bodies in one of Delphi Automotive's old production facilities in Livorno and to fit bodywork, paint and finish its cars in the former Pininfarina factory in Grugliasco.

In May 2012, De Tomaso was again for sale after their business plan failed to gather sufficient financial backing. In July 2012, Rossignolo was arrested following allegations that he misused 7.5 million Euro worth of government funds. In September 2012, speculation emerged that BMW might be interested in the brand factory to produce new BMW models.

In 2014, the original workshop in Modena was in abandonment.

In April 2015, an Italian bankruptcy court approved the sale of the company to Hong Kong–based Consolidated Ideal Team Ventures, for €1,050,000. Per that sale report "A lawyer for the buyer announced that Ideal Team Venture plans to produce cars in China bearing the De Tomaso name."

== De Tomaso sports cars ==
=== Vallelunga ===
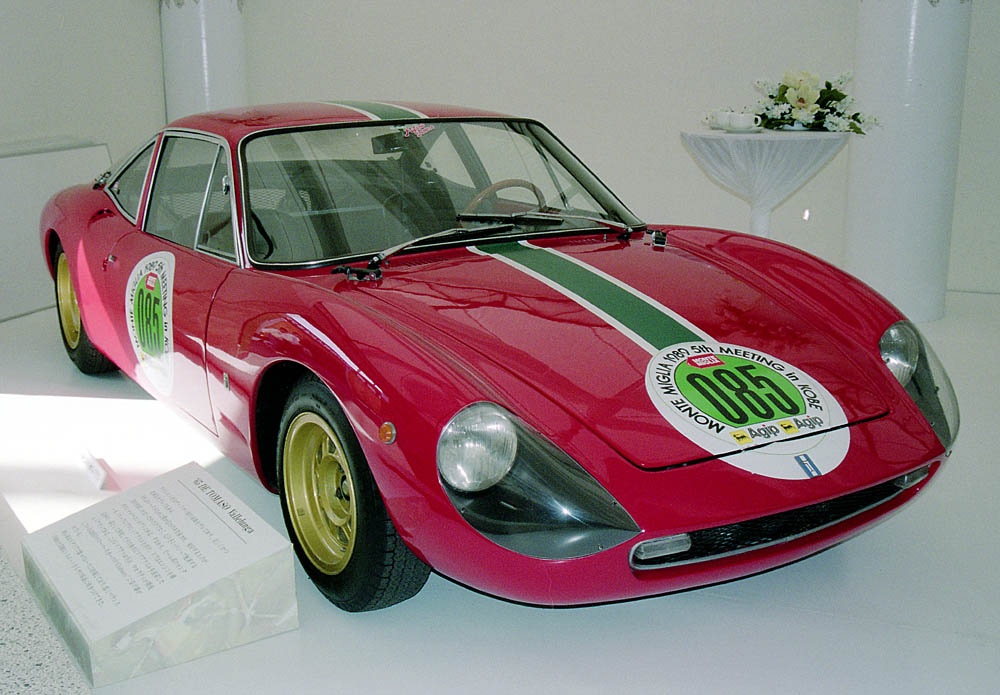
De Tomaso Vallelunga

De Tomaso's first road-going production model was the Vallelunga (named after the racing circuit) introduced in 1963; a spider competition version was being raced a few months before the introduction. This mid-engine sports car had a 104 hp (78 kW) 4 cylinder engine shared with the Ford Cortina, and was able to attain a top speed of 215 km/h (134 mph). It had a fabricated steel backbone chassis, which was to become a common feature of De Tomaso cars. The aluminium coupé body was designed and several built by Fissore before production was moved to Ghia in 1965 where they were assembled with fibreglass bodies. In all, approximately 60 were produced.

=== Mangusta ===
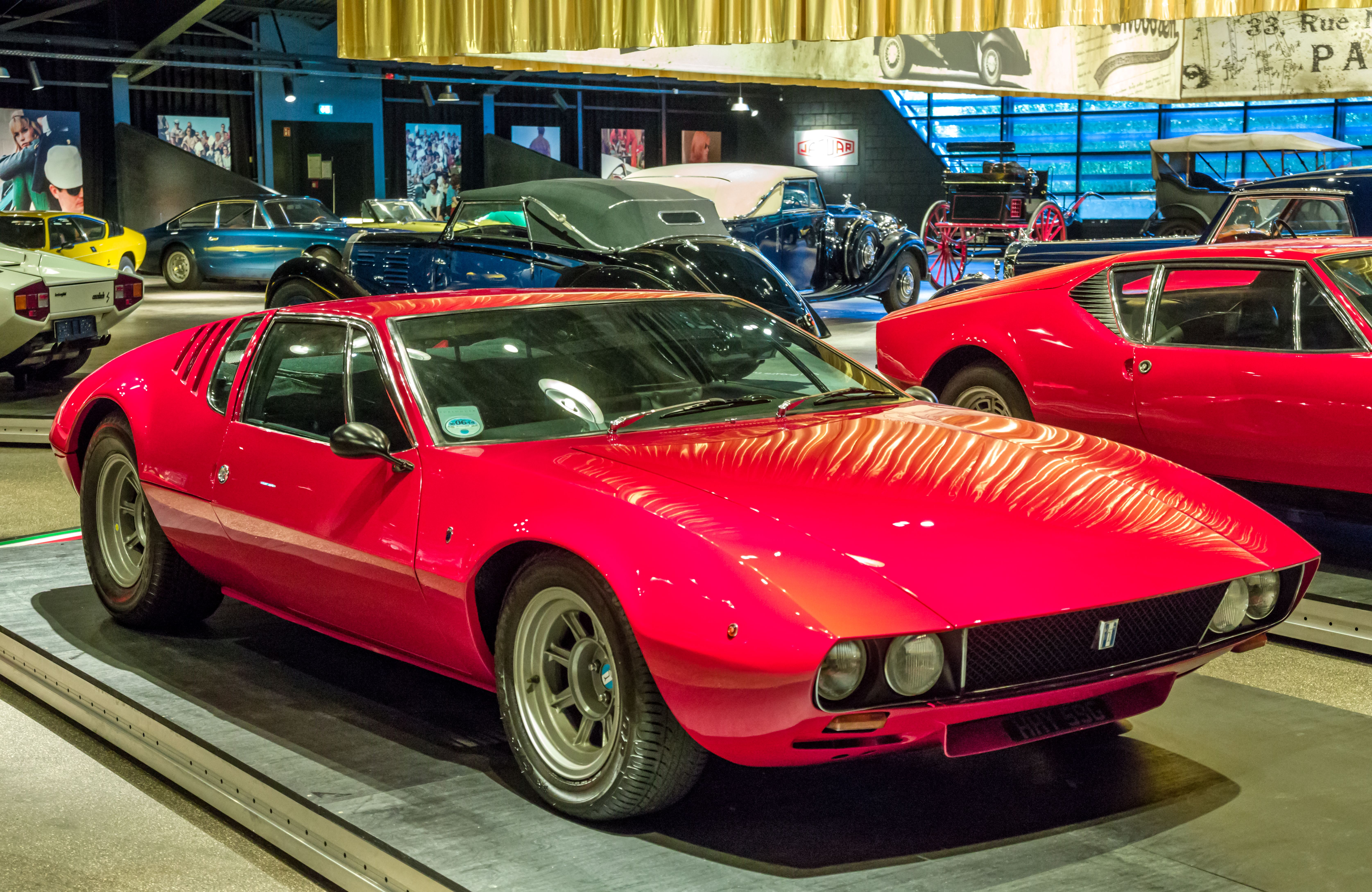
De Tomaso Mangusta

The Mangusta, introduced in 1966 was the first De Tomaso produced in significant numbers. With the Mangusta, De Tomaso moved from European to American Ford engines. The car had a 4.7-litre iron-block V8 engine and steel and aluminium coupé bodywork from Ghia—an Italian coachbuilder also controlled by Alejandro de Tomaso. About 400 Mangustas were built before production ended in 1971.

=== Pantera ===
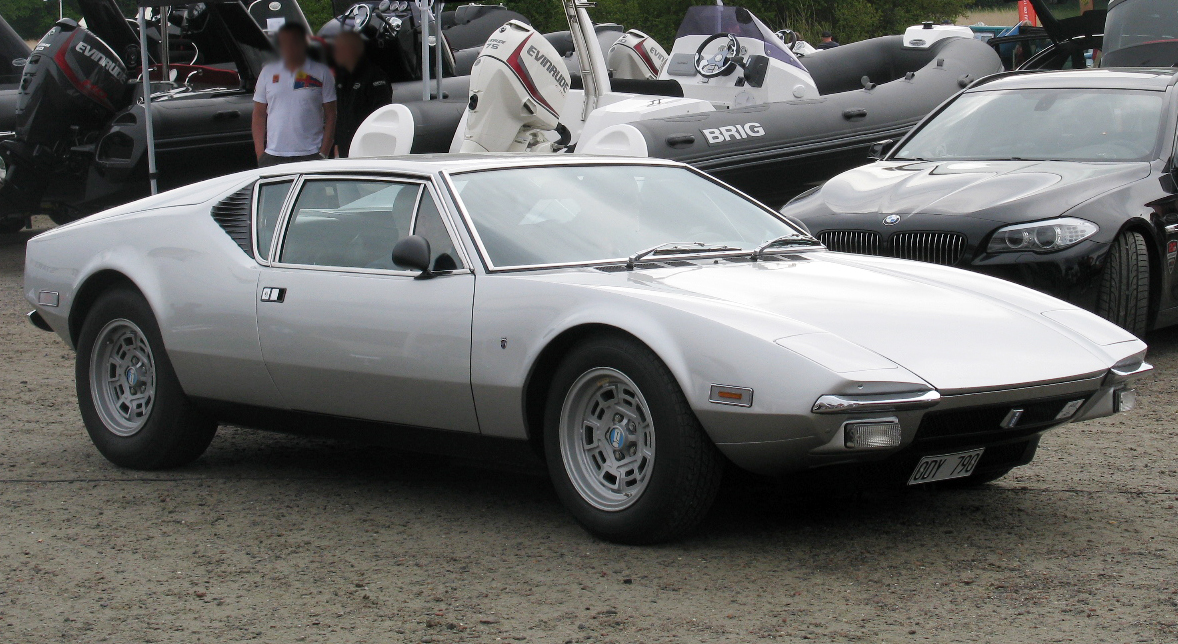
De Tomaso Pantera

The Mangusta was succeeded by the Pantera. It appeared in 1971 with a 351 Cleveland Ford V8 and a low, wedge-shaped body designed by Ghia's Tom Tjaarda. Through an agreement with Ford, De Tomaso sold Panteras in the USA through Ford's Lincoln-Mercury dealers. Between 1971 and 1973, 6,128 Panteras were produced in Modena, the largest number of cars De Tomaso produced. The 1973 oil crisis and other factors compelled Ford to pull out of the Pantera deal at the end of 1973, a few months after buying all of De Tomaso's shares and getting control of the entire production process in the three factories that shared the workload in northern Italy.

But De Tomaso retained from Ford the right to produce the car for the "rest of the world" market, so he continued Pantera production at a greatly reduced scale of fewer than 100 cars per year during the 1970s and 1980s. From then on, the cars were largely hand-built, even more than before.

Incorporating a Marcello Gandini facelift, suspension redesign, partial chassis redesign and a new, smaller Ford engine, the Pantera 90 Si model (the i standing for iniezione—Italian for fuel injection) was introduced in 1990. There were 41 90 Si models manufactured with 2 crash tested, 38 sold, and 1 example going directly into a museum before the Pantera was finally phased out in 1993 to make way for the radical, carbon-fibre-bodied Guarà.

=== Guarà ===
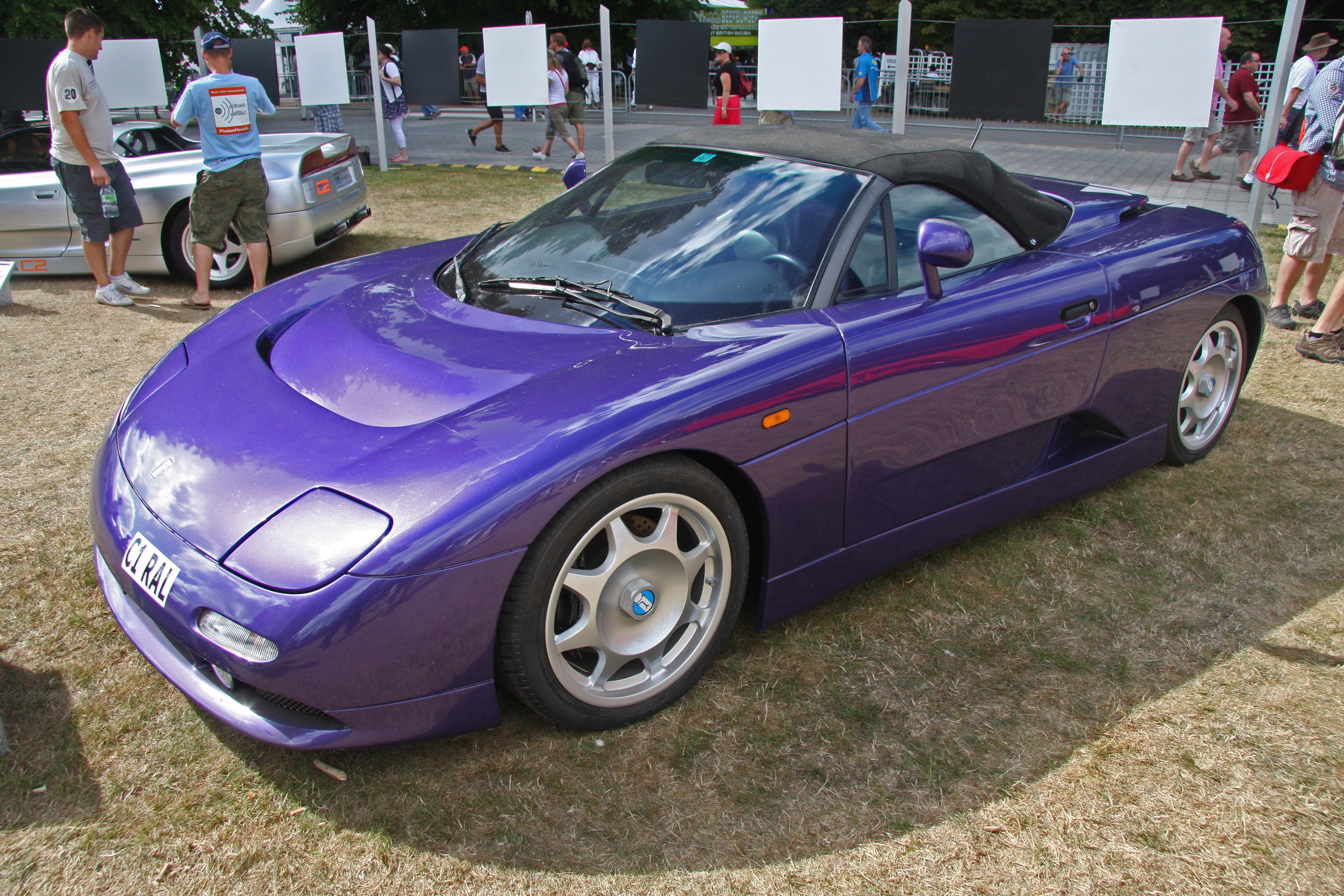
De Tomaso Guarà Spider

The Guarà succeeded the Pantera and began production in 1993. The Guarà was designed by Carlo Gaino of Synthesis design, an Italian design house; Gaino also designed the Maserati Barchetta. Based on a Maserati competition car from 1991, using Ford and BMW parts in a composite body, the Guarà was available in coupé and barchetta versions. As with all De Tomasos except the Pantera, production was both limited and sporadic.

=== Biguà and off-road vehicles ===
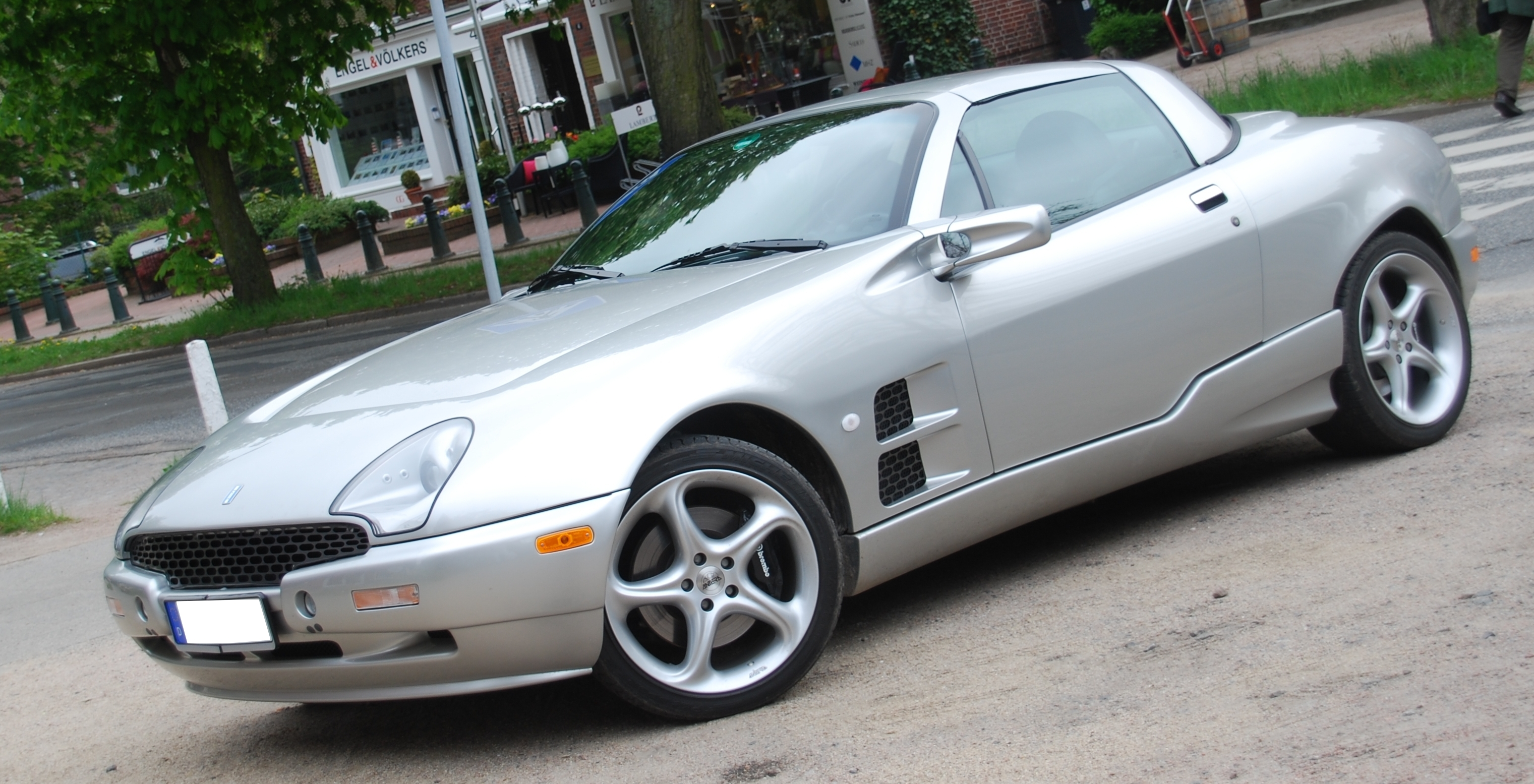
De Tomaso Biguà/Qvale Mangusta

In the early 2000s two other cars were planned by De Tomaso, but both proved abortive. A two-seat Gandini-styled convertible, the Biguà, was developed from a 1996 Geneva concept in partnership with Qvale, an American firm which had long imported European sports cars into the USA. But as production of the Biguà—renamed the Mangusta—began, the relationship between De Tomaso and Qvale soured; Qvale took over the car and rebadged it as the Qvale Mangusta. Production was short-lived, and Qvale's Italian factory was bought in 2003 by MG Rover and the Mangusta's mechanicals were then used as the basis of the MG XPower SV. In April 2002, De Tomaso began a project to build off-road vehicles in a new factory in Calabria in partnership with the Russian company UAZ, but this too floundered. The deal projected a production rate of 10,000 cars a year by 2006: however, no cars were built and De Tomaso went into voluntary liquidation in June 2004 after the death of Alejandro de Tomaso in 2003. The Guarà remained available in some markets in 2005 and 2006, but it appears that no cars were built after 2004.

=== P72 ===
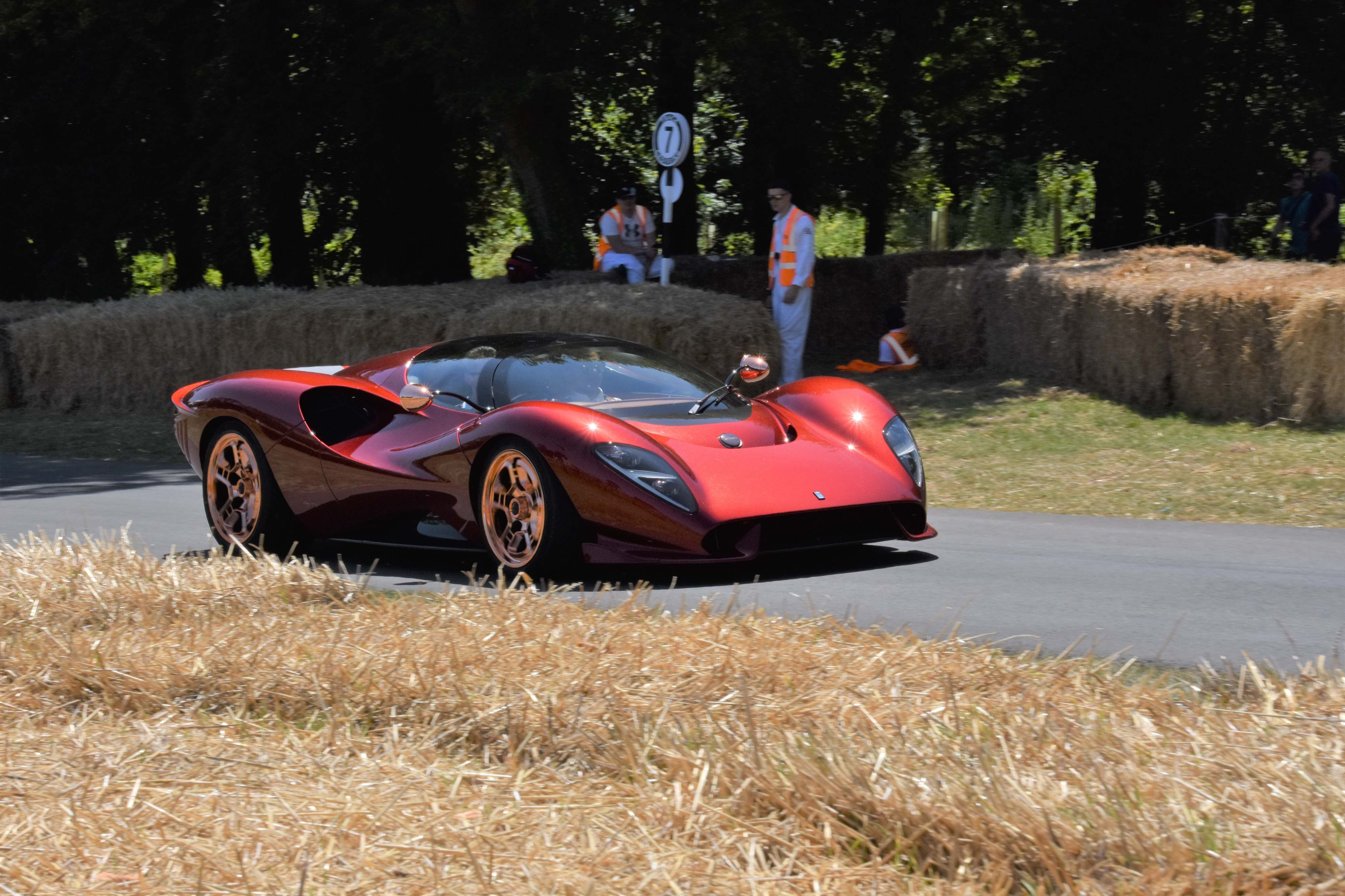
De Tomaso P72 at its first appearance during the Goodwood Festival of Speed 2019

The P72 is a retro-styled sports car introduced at the 2019 Goodwood Festival of Speed under the newly reformed DeTomaso brand. Designed by Jowyn Wong, the car is a homage to the P70, a race car built by Carroll Shelby and styled by Peter Brock for De Tomaso, introduced in the late 1960s. The design of the car is meant to be hailing back to the LeMans race cars of the 1960s. The interior of the car is meant to have a modern outlook with opulent instrumentation. The chassis built to LMP1 standards is shared with the sister company Apollo Automobil's Intensa Emozione.

== De Tomaso luxury cars ==
Although De Tomaso is principally known as a maker of high-performance sports cars, the firm also produced luxury coupés and saloons in tiny number throughout the 1970s and 1980s.

The 1971 Deauville was an effort to rival contemporary Jaguar and Mercedes-Benz saloons. With the same engine as the Pantera mounted in the front, the Deauville was clothed in an angular Tjaarda/Ghia four-door body. The Deauville did not compete with its rivals, especially those from Germany, on the perspective of build quality. Despite remaining on De Tomaso's offerings until 1985, only 244 were ever made. A single example of an estate was built for Alejandro de Tomaso's wife, the American racing driver Isabelle Haskell.

In 1972, De Tomaso introduced a coupé based on the Deauville with a slightly shortened Deauville chassis and the same Ford V8 engine, called the Longchamp. Its body design, however, was substantially different, and influenced by the Lancia Marica prototype, also designed by Tom Tjaarda. A total of 409 cars of all variations were built by the time the production ended in 1989.

== Maserati ==
With the assistance of the Italian government, De Tomaso took over Maserati in 1976 after its owner, Citroën, declared that it would no longer support the loss-making company. The first Maserati De Tomaso introduced, the Kyalami, was a Longchamp redesigned by Frua, with the Ford engine replaced by Maserati's own 4.2-litre V8. The Kyalami remained in production until 1983, when it was superseded by the Biturbo, introduced two years earlier. Other cars Introduced under the De Tomaso ownership included the Quattroporte III/Royale and IV, the Barchetta, the Ghibli and the Shamal. All of the latter cars other than the Quattroporte III were based on the Biturbo while the Quattroporte was based on the Kyalami platform. De Tomaso introduced this concept of platform sharing to save development costs on new models. In 1993, De Tomaso sold Maserati to Fiat S.p.A. due to slumping sales and low profitability.

== Innocenti ==
In 1976, Innocenti passed to Alejandro de Tomaso and was reorganised by the De Tomaso Group under the name Nuova Innocenti.

From 1976 to 1987, the top of the range Innocenti was the Innocenti Mini de Tomaso, a sport version of the Innocenti Mini developed by De Tomaso, initially equipped with the BLMC 1275 cc engine, and from 1982 to 1987, with a 1.0-litre 3-cylinder turbocharged Daihatsu engine.

De Tomaso sold Innocenti to Fiat S.p.A. in 1993.

== Revival ==
=== 2009 acquisition ===
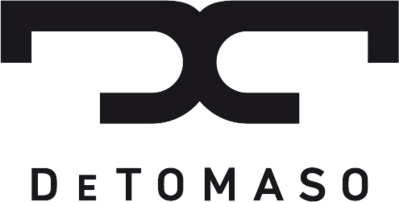
Logo of De Tomaso Automobili launched in 2009

In 2009, the De Tomaso trademark was bought by Former Fiat executive Gian Mario Rossignolo who founded a new company named "De Tomaso Automobili SpA". A new business plan for the company called for producing three models for a total of 8,000 vehicles: 3,000 crossovers, 3,000 limousines, and 2,000 two-seater sports cars.

==== 2011 De Tomaso Deauville ====
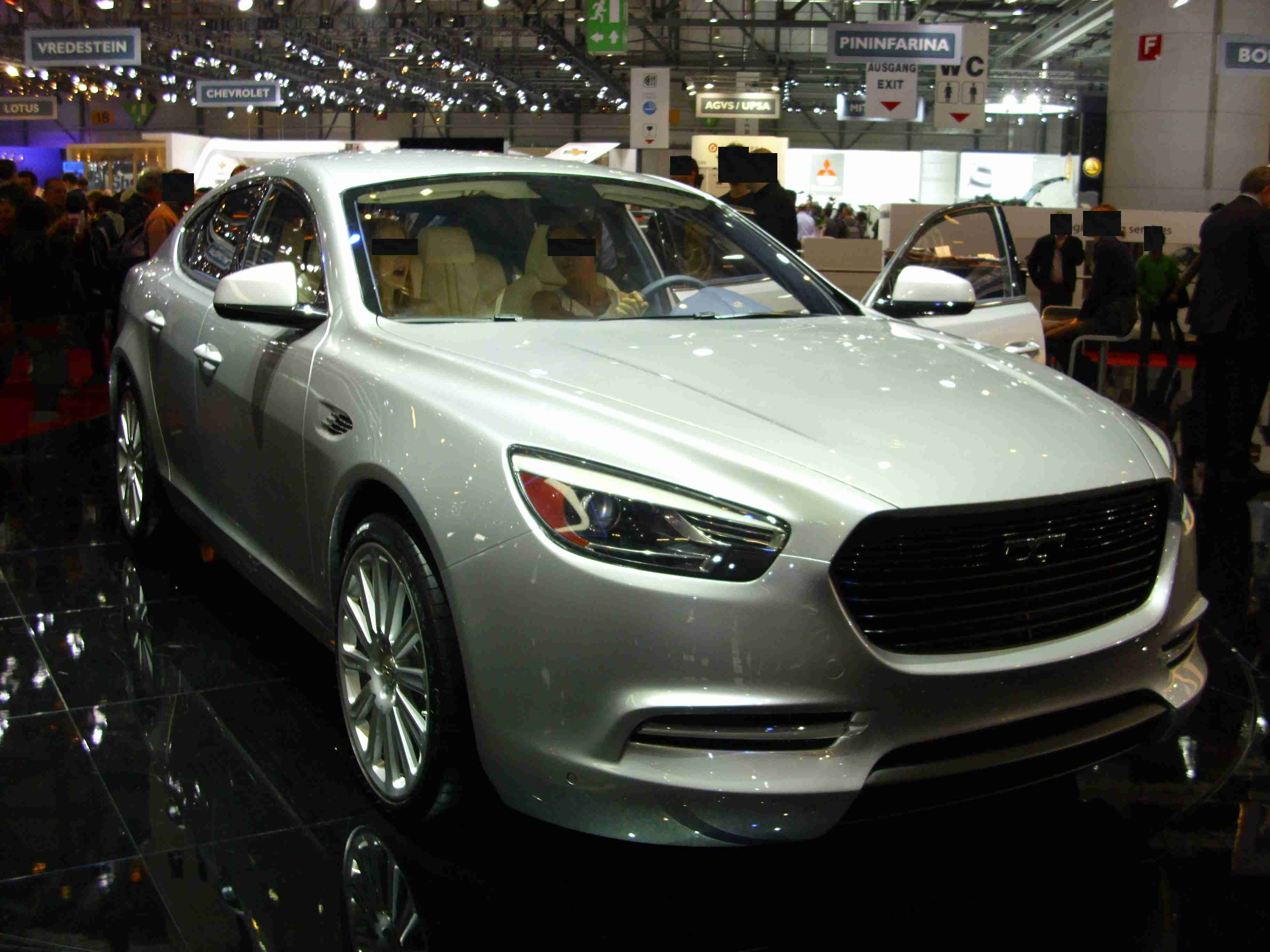
Deauville Concept at Geneva in 2011

At the 2011 Geneva Motor Show, De Tomaso presented a new model. The new De Tomaso Deauville was to have been a five-door hatchback/crossover vehicle with all-wheel drive, which, in the details of its styling, quotes models from BMW and Mercedes-Benz.

The proposed range included two gasoline engines with 300 PS and 500 PS as well as a diesel from VM Motori with 250 PS. The Deauville remained a prototype, as the new company never started production and the company chairman, Rossignolo, was arrested in 2012 on account of misappropriation of funds taken from the Italian government to revive the De Tomaso brand. As a result, 900 employees of the company were made redundant. Rossignolo was sentenced to five and a half years of imprisonment on the charges of fraud and embezzlement in 2018.

=== 2014 acquisition ===
The rights to the De Tomaso brand were acquired by Norman Choi of Ideal Team Ventures in 2014. The new management under Choi's leadership undertook the task of reviving the brand. Five years later, the company unveiled its first product, the P72 retro-styled sports car at the Goodwood Festival of Speed, at the time of 60th anniversary of the De Tomaso brand. The car had been in development under the code name of "Project P". The new car is based on the Apollo Intensa Emozione's monocoque chassis, a car manufactured by De Tomaso's sister company Apollo Automobil and 72 units of the car will be sold.

=== P900 ===
In November 2022, De Tomaso announced a track-only hypercar named the P900. The new vehicle will have a 900 hp (670 kW) 6.2-liter naturally aspirated V12 engine designed to run on carbon-neutral synthetic fuels. De Tomaso only plans to produce 18 P900s and sell them for a starting price of US$3 million. At the time of the announcement, the V12 engine was still in development and would not be fully ready until late 2024, leading De Tomaso to also offer a V10 engined option.

== Formula One ==
De Tomaso as a Formula One chassis constructor
Formula One World Championship career
- Engines: OSCA, Alfa Romeo, De Tomaso, Ferrari, Ford
- Entrants: Scuderia Serenissima, Scuderia Settecolli, Frank Williams Racing Cars
- First entry: 1961 French Grand Prix
- Last entry: 1970 United States Grand Prix
- Races entered: 15 (10 starts)
- Race victories: 0
- Constructors' Championships: 0
- Drivers' Championships: 0
- Points: 0
- Pole positions: 0
- Fastest laps: 0

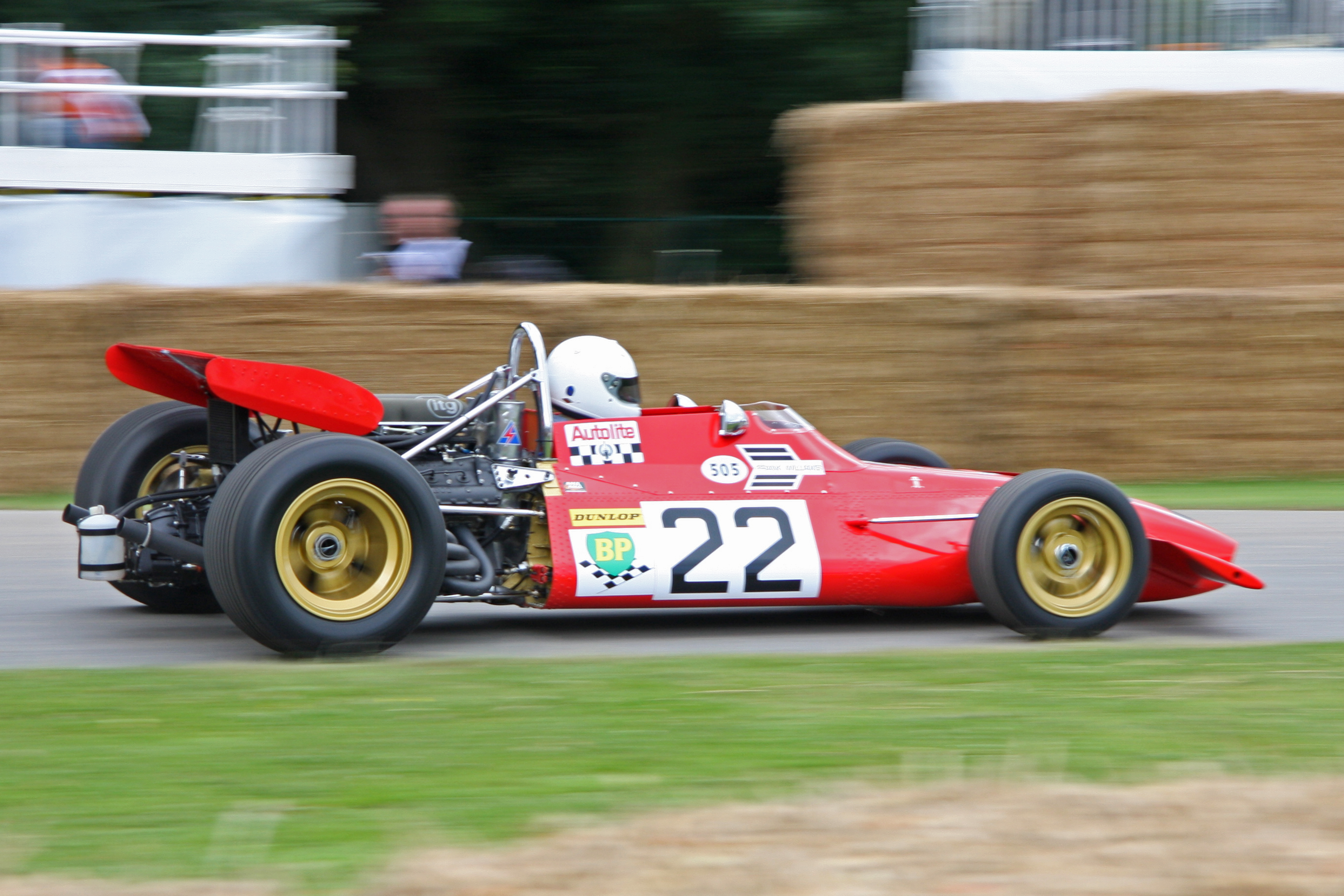
1970 De Tomaso 505/38

De Tomaso made a handful of Formula One appearances from 1961 to 1963, with their own chassis and a mix of engines. During 1962, the "De Tomaso 801" appeared, with an original 135-degree 1498 cc V8 with a claimed 200 CV (147 kW) at 9500 rpm, and a six-speed De Tomaso transmission (although presumably developed by Valerio Colotti). The stubby and somewhat unaerodynamic design of the car raised some questions among period writers, as did the claimed max power. The De Tomaso 801 was entered in a number of races but only appeared at the 1962 Italian Grand Prix, where it failed to qualify.

De Tomaso then built a Formula One chassis (designed by Giampaolo Dallara) for Frank Williams Racing Cars to use in the 1970 Formula One season. The car was uncompetitive, failing to finish the first four races of the year. In the fifth, the Dutch Grand Prix, the De Tomaso 505/38 flipped and caught fire, killing driver Piers Courage. The team persevered, first with Brian Redman, then Tim Schenken. However, with no results, the partnership was dissolved at the end of the season.

=== Complete Formula One World Championship results ===
(key)

Year	Entrant	Chassis	Engine	Tyres	Drivers	1	2	3	4	5	6	7	8	9	10	11	12	13	Points	WCC
1961						MON	NED	BEL	FRA	GBR	GER	ITA	USA						0	-
1961	Scuderia Settecolli	De Tomaso F1/002	O.S.C.A. S4	D	Roberto Lippi							Ret							0	-
1961	Scuderia Serenissima	De Tomaso F1/001	O.S.C.A. S4	D	Giorgio Scarlatti				Ret										0	-
1961	Scuderia Serenissima	De Tomaso F1/003	Alfa Romeo I4	D	Nino Vaccarella							Ret							0	-
1961	Isobele de Tomaso	De Tomaso F1/004	Alfa Romeo I4	D	Roberto Bussinello							Ret							0	-
1962						NED	MON	BEL	FRA	GBR	GER	ITA	USA	RSA					0	-
1962	Scuderia Settecolli	De Tomaso F1/002	O.S.C.A. I4	D	Roberto Lippi							DNQ							0	-
1962	Scuderia de Tomaso	De Tomaso 801	De Tomaso Flat-8	D	Nasif Estéfano							DNQ							0	-
1963						MON	BEL	NED	FRA	GBR	GER	ITA	USA	MEX	RSA				0	-
1963	Scuderia Settecolli	De Tomaso F1/002	Ferrari V6	D	Roberto Lippi							DNQ							0	-
1970	Frank Williams Racing Cars	De Tomaso 505/38	Cosworth V8	D		RSA	ESP	MON	BEL	NED	FRA	GBR	GER	AUT	ITA	CAN	USA	MEX	0	-
1970	Frank Williams Racing Cars	De Tomaso 505/38	Cosworth V8	D	Piers Courage	Ret	DNS	NC	Ret	Ret									0	-
1970	Frank Williams Racing Cars	De Tomaso 505/38	Cosworth V8	D	Brian Redman							DNS	DNQ						0	-
1970	Frank Williams Racing Cars	De Tomaso 505/38	Cosworth V8	D	Tim Schenken									Ret	Ret	NC	Ret		0	-

== Car list ==
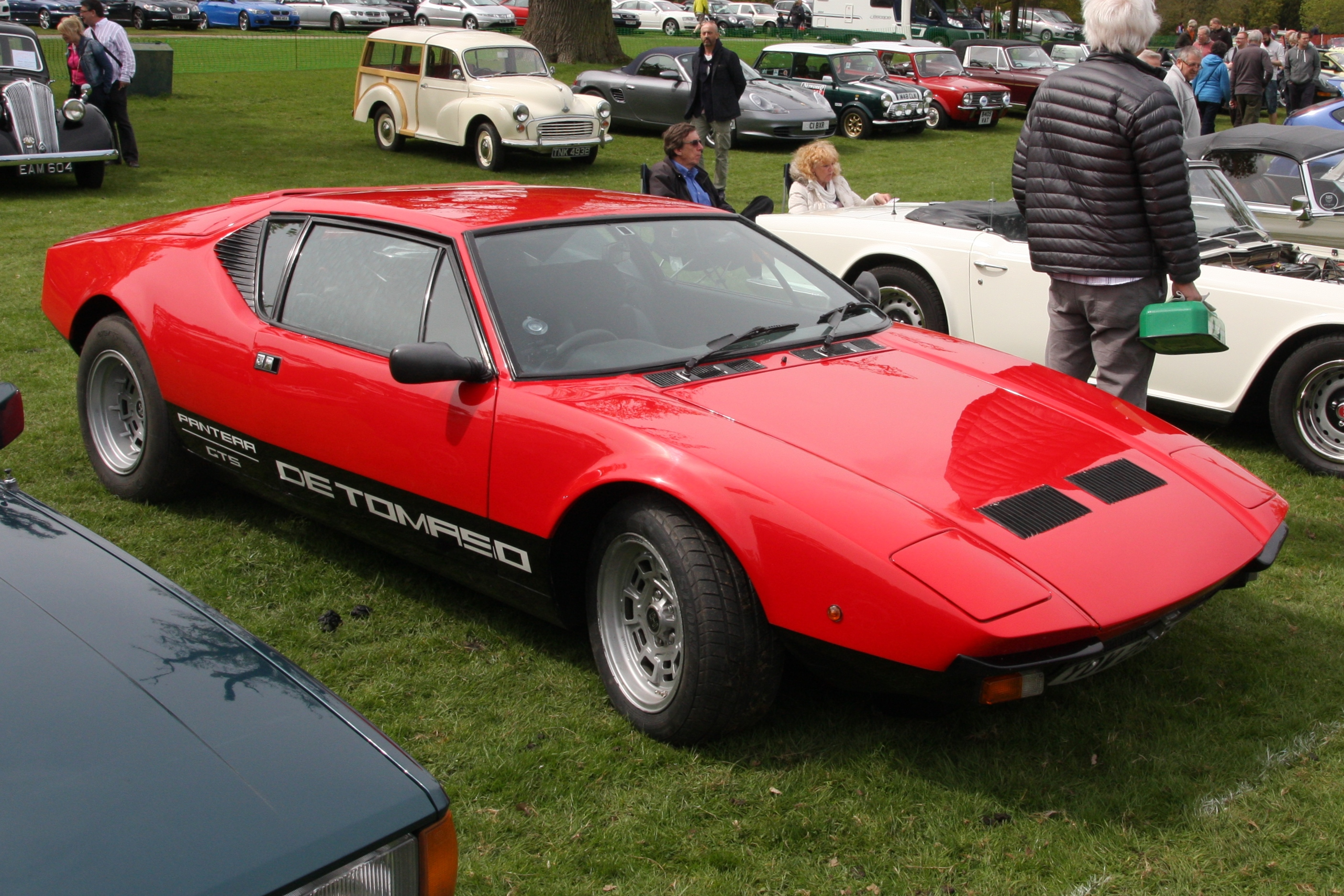
De Tomaso Pantera GTS

- Vallelunga
- Sport 5000 (also known as the 70P, P70 and Ghia DeTomaso)
- De Tomaso 5000
- De Tomaso Sport 2000
- Mangusta
- Pantera
- Deauville
- Longchamp
- Guarà
- Biguà
- P72
- P900
