= Maserati Quattroporte =

Four-door luxury sports sedan

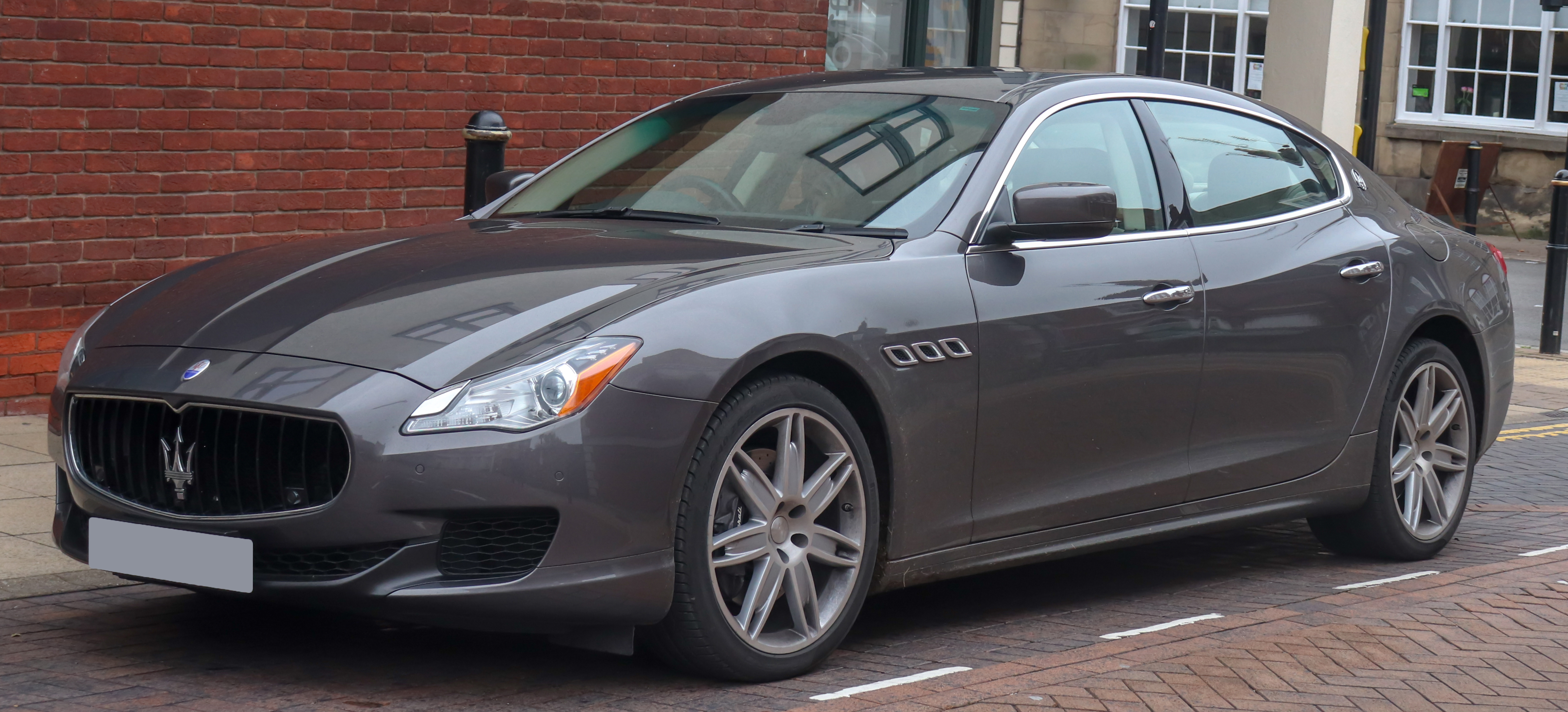
- Maserati Quattroporte VI

Overview
- Manufacturer: Maserati
- Production: 1963–1969; 1971; 1974–1990; 1994–2001; 2003–2012; 2013–2023
- Assembly: Italy: Modena; Italy: Grugliasco (Avv. Giovanni Agnelli Plant: 2013–2022); Italy: Turin (Stabilimento Mirafiori: 2022–2023)

Body and chassis
- Class: Full-size luxury car (F)
- Body style: 4-door saloon

The Maserati Quattroporte (Italian pronunciation: [ˌkwattroˈpɔrte]) is a four-door full-size luxury saloon produced by Italian automobile manufacturer Maserati. The name translated from Italian means "four doors". The production of the sixth generation ended in late 2023, with the first generation introduced in 1963.

== Quattroporte I (AM107, 1963–1969) ==
First generation
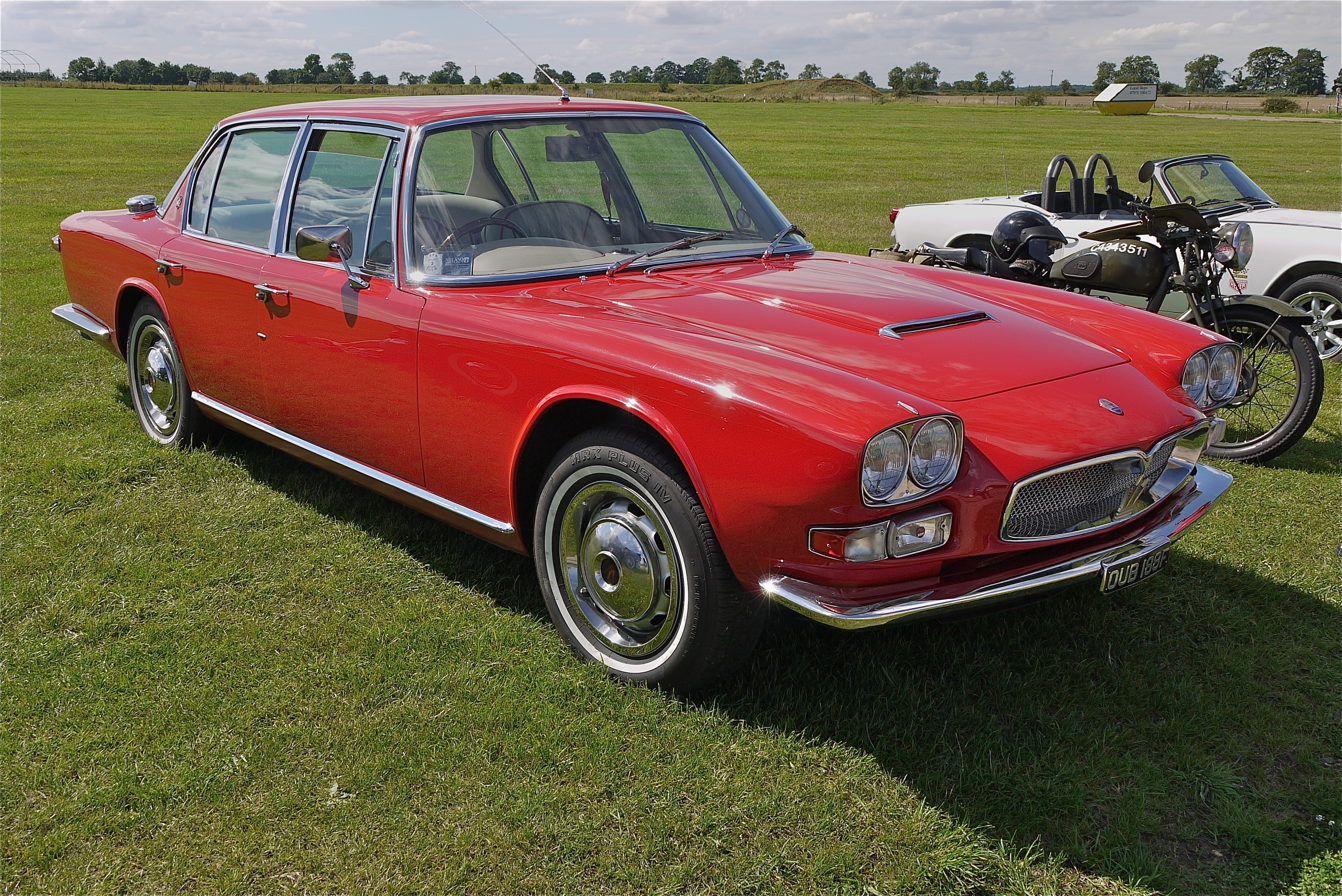
- Maserati Quattroporte 4200 (Series II)

Overview
- Production: 1963–1969
- Designer: Pietro Frua

Body and chassis
- Layout: Front-engine, rear-wheel-drive
- Related: Maserati Mexico

Powertrain
- Engine: 4.1 L Tipo AM 107 V8; 4.7 L Tipo AM 107/1 V8
- Transmission: 5-speed ZF S5 manual 3-speed Borg Warner automatic

Dimensions
- Wheelbase: 2,750 mm (108.3 in)
- Length: 5,000 mm (196.9 in)
- Width: 1,720 mm (67.7 in)
- Height: 1,360 mm (53.5 in)
- Kerb weight: 1,757 kg (3,874 lb)

The original Maserati Quattroporte (Tipo AM107) was built between 1963 and 1969. It was a large saloon powered by a V8 engine, both firsts for a series production Maserati automobile.

=== History ===
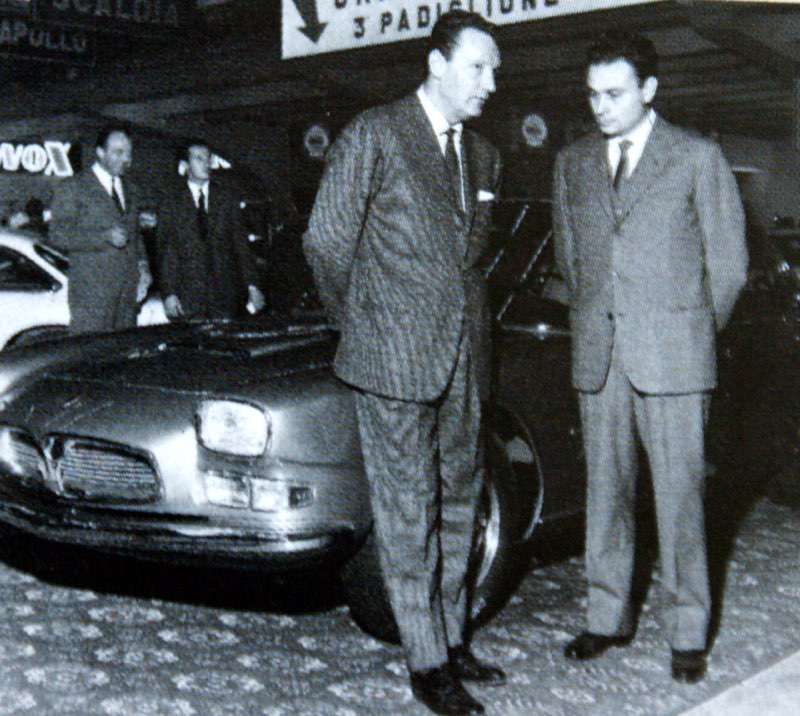
Giulio Alfieri with Omer Orsi at the launch of the Quattroporte at the Torino Salon in 1963

The task of styling the Quattroporte was given to Turinese coachbuilder Pietro Frua, who drew inspiration from a special 5000 GT (chassis number 103.060) which he had designed in 1962 for Prince Karim Aga Khan. While the design was by Frua, body construction was carried out by Vignale.

==== Series I (1963–1966) ====
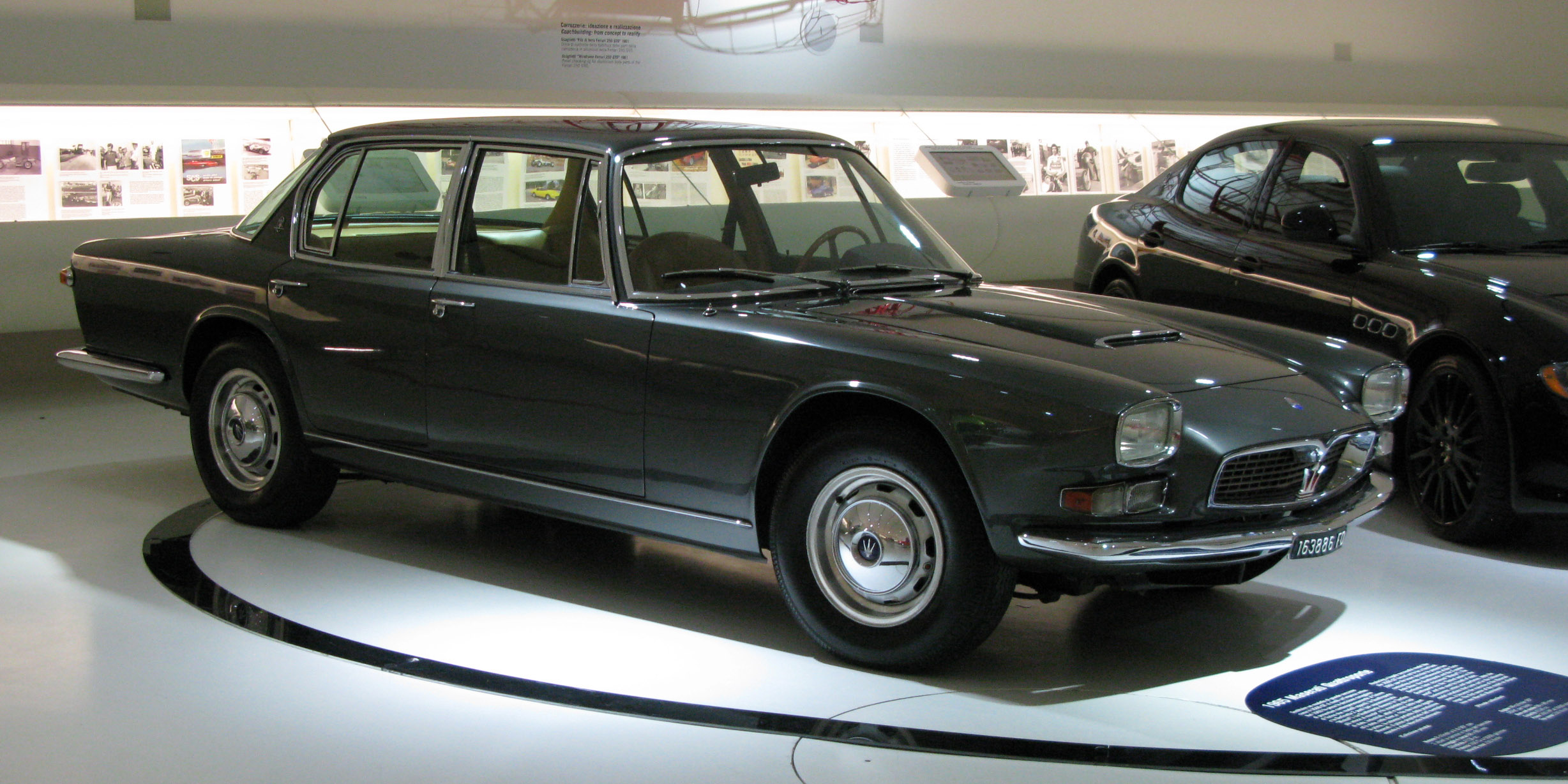
1965 Maserati Quattroporte (Series I)

The Quattroporte was introduced at the October–November 1963 Turin Motor Show, where a pre-production prototype was on the Maserati stand next to the Mistral coupé. Regular production began in 1964. The Tipo 107 Quattroporte joined two other grand tourers, the Facel Vega and the Lagonda Rapide, capable of traveling at speeds of up to 200 km/h (124 mph) on the new motorways in Europe. It was equipped with a 4.1-litre (4,136 cc or 252 cu in) V8 engine, rated at 260 PS DIN (191 kW; 256 hp) at 5,000 rpm, and equipped with either a five-speed ZF manual transmission or a three-speed Borg Warner automatic on request. Maserati claimed a top speed of 230 km/h (143 mph). The car was also exported to the United States, where federal regulations mandated twin round headlamps in place of the single rectangular ones found on European models.

Maserati manufactured 230 of its first generation Quattroportes Between 1963 and 1966.

==== Series II (1966–1969) ====
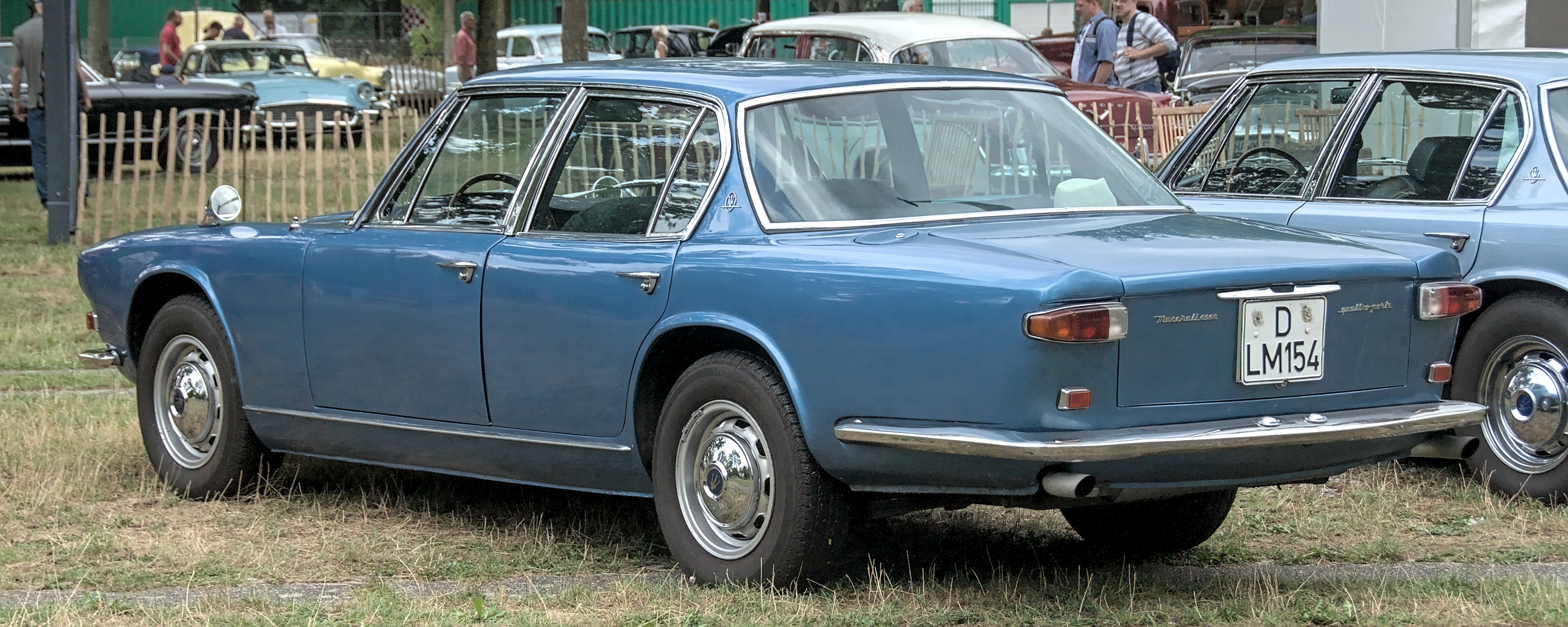
1967 Maserati Quattroporte rear view (Series II)

In 1966, Maserati revised the Tipo 107, adding the twin headlights already used on the U.S. model. A leaf-sprung solid axle took the place of the previous De Dion tube. The interior was completely redesigned, including the dashboard, which now had a full-width wood-trimmed fascia. In 1968 alongside the 4.1-litre a 4.7-litre version became also available (AM107/4700), developing 290 PS (213 kW; 286 hp) DIN. Top speed increased to a claimed 255 km/h (158 mph), making the Quattroporte 4700 the fastest four-door sedan in the world at the time.

Around 500 of the second series were made, for a total of 776 Tipo 107 Quattroportes. Production ended in 1969.

=== Specifications ===
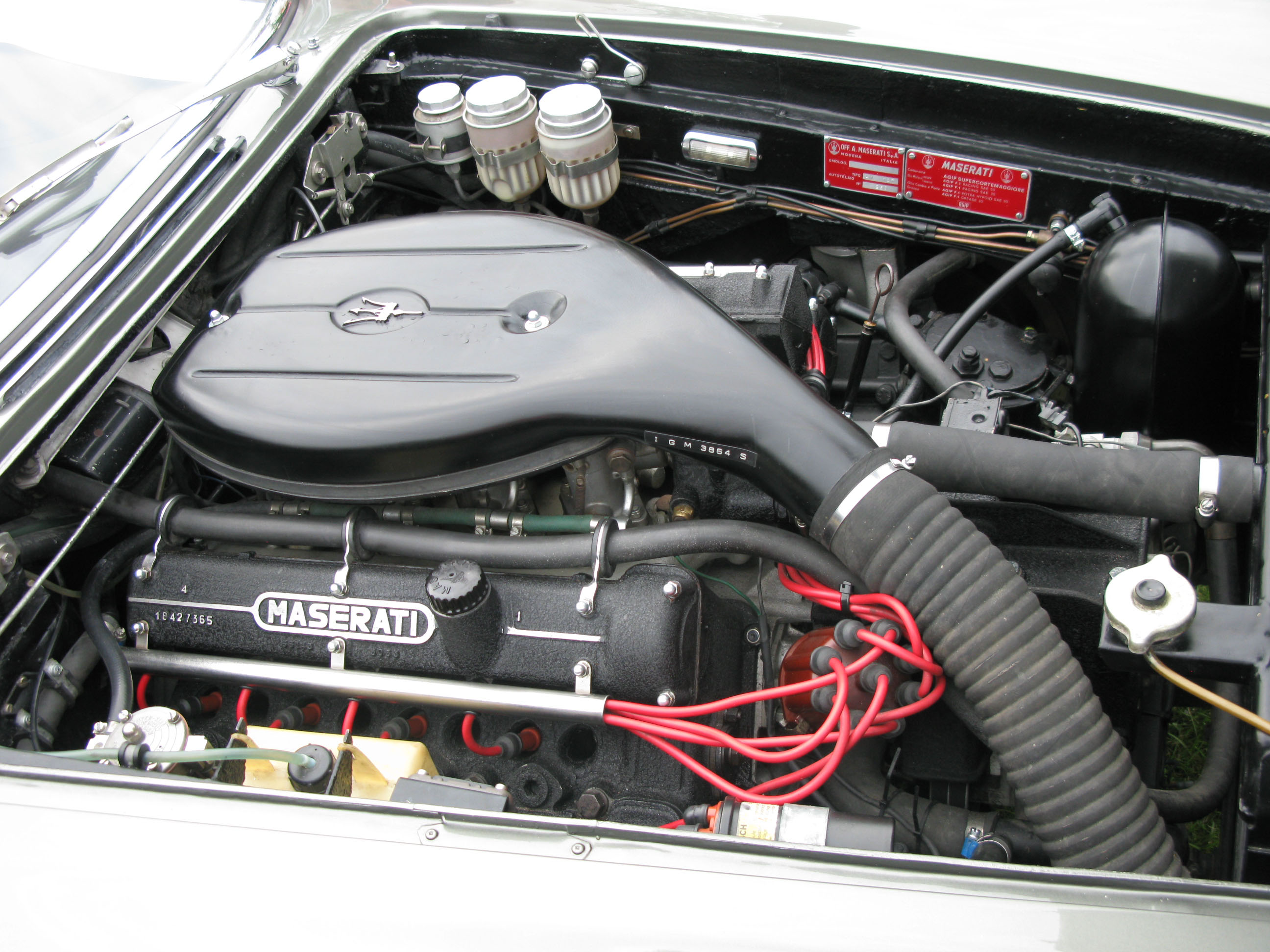
Quattroporte 4200 V8 engine

The first generation of the Quattroporte had a steel unibody structure, complemented by a front subframe. Front suspension was independent, with coil springs and hydraulic dampers. Rear suspension used a coil sprung De Dion tube featuring inboard brakes on the first series, later changed to a more conventional Salisbury leaf sprung solid axle with a single trailing link on the second series. On both axles there were anti-roll bars. Brakes were solid Girling discs all around. A limited-slip differential was optional.

==== Engines ====
The long lived quad cam, all-aluminium Maserati V8 engine made its début on the Quattroporte. It featured two chain-driven overhead camshafts per bank, 16 angled valves, hemispherical combustion chambers, inserted cast iron wet cylinder liners, and was fed through an aluminium, water-cooled inlet manifold by four downdraft twin-choke Weber carburetors—initially 38 DCNL 5 and 40 DCNL 5 on 4200 and 4700 cars respectively, later changed to 40 DCNF 5 and 42 DCNF 5 starting from December 1968.

Model	Engine	Peak power	Peak torque	Top speed
Quattroporte 4200	4,136 cc (252 cu in); 90° DOHC V8	264 PS (194 kW; 260 hp) at 5,500 rpm	370 N⋅m (273 lb⋅ft) at 3,500 rpm	230 km/h (143 mph)
Quattroporte 4700	4,719 cc (288 cu in); 90° DOHC V8	290 PS (213 kW; 286 hp) at 5,200 rpm	410 N⋅m (302 lb⋅ft) at 3,500 rpm	255 km/h (158 mph)

== Special models (AM121, 1971 and 1974) ==
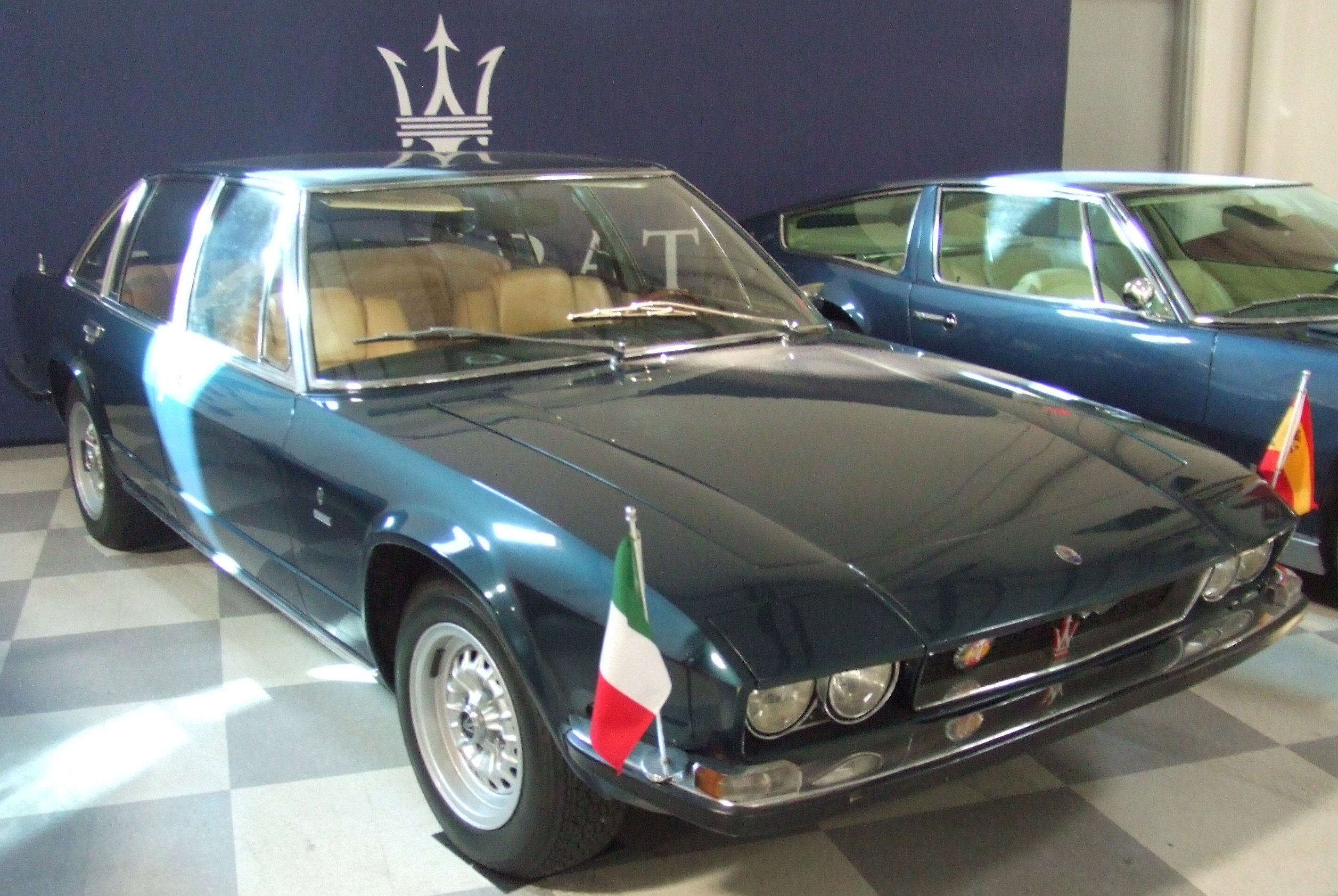
s/n 002 Quattroporte V8

In 1971, Karim Aga Khan ordered another special one-off based on the Maserati Indy platform. Rory Brown was commissioned as the chief engineer of the project. The car received the 4.9-litre V8 engine (Tipo AM 107/49), rated at 300 PS (221 kW; 296 hp). Carrozzeria Frua designed the car, the prototype of which was displayed in 1971 and 1972 in Paris and Geneva respectively. The car was production ready, even receiving its own chassis code (AM 121), but new owner Citroën used their influence to have Maserati develop the SM-based Quattroporte II instead. Only two vehicles were finished, chassis #004 was sold by Maserati to the Aga Khan in 1974, and the prototype #002 went to the King of Spain, who bought the car directly from Frua.

== Quattroporte II (AM123, 1974–1978) ==
Second generation
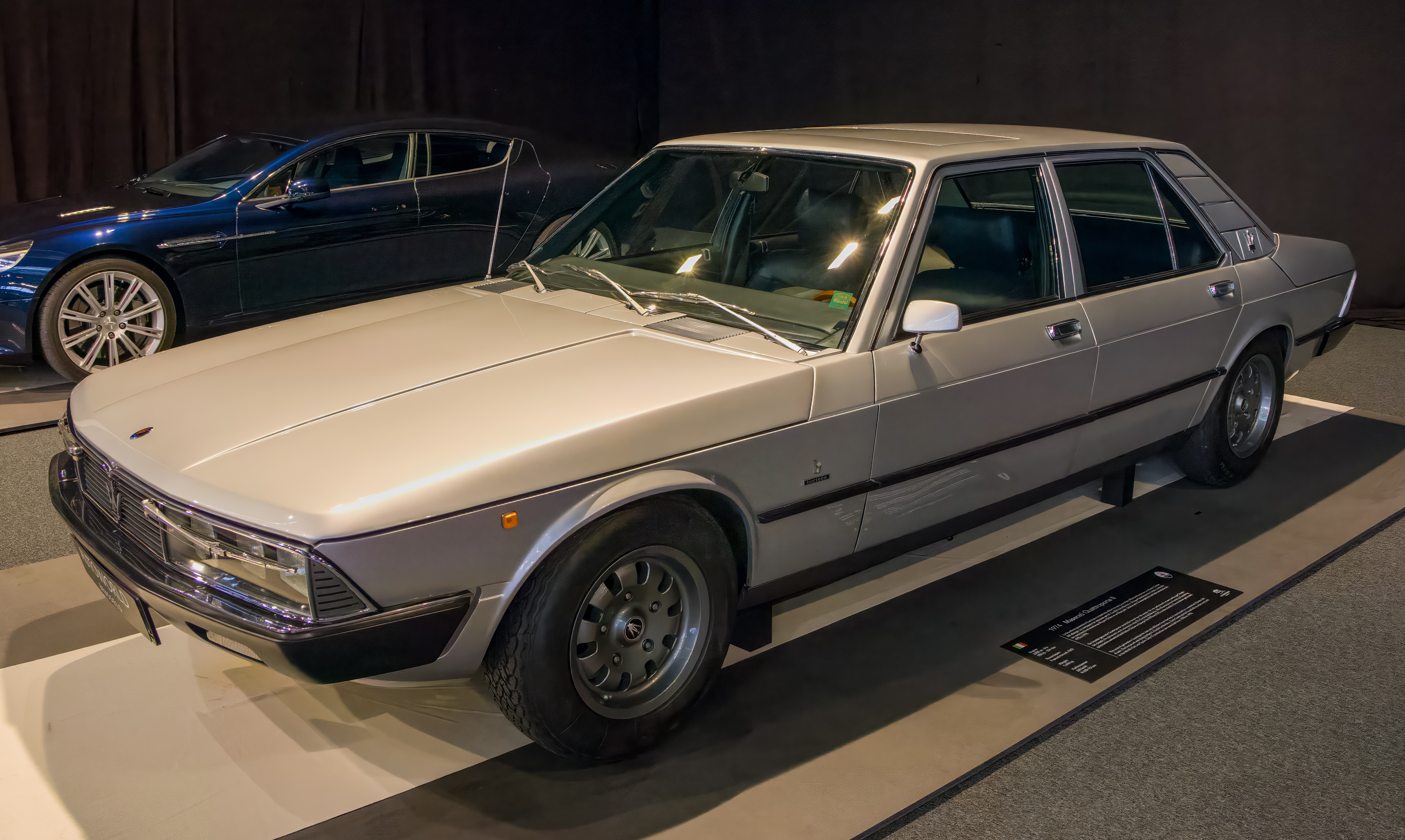
- Maserati Quattroporte II prototype

Overview
- Production: 1976–1978; 12 produced
- Designer: Marcello Gandini at Bertone

Body and chassis
- Layout: Longitudinal Front mid-engine, front-wheel drive
- Platform: Citroën SM

Powertrain
- Engine: 3.0 L Tipo AM 114.56.30 V6
- Transmission: 5-speed manual

Dimensions
- Wheelbase: 3,070 mm (120.9 in)
- Length: 5,130 mm (202.0 in)
- Width: 1,870 mm (73.6 in)
- Height: 1,400 mm (55.1 in)
- Kerb weight: 1,732 kg (3,818 lb)

The second generation Quattroporte, named Maserati Quattroporte II (AM 123), was introduced at the Paris Motor Show and the Turin Motor Show in October 1974. As the result of Citroën's joint-venture with Maserati in 1968, the Quattroporte II was very different from its predecessor and the other Maserati automobiles of the past. Based on a stretched version of the Citroën SM's chassis, the Quattroporte II featured a front-mid-engine, front-wheel-drive layout, hydropneumatic suspension, four fixed headlamps with two swivelling directional headlights, and a V6 engine. The bodywork was designed by Marcello Gandini at Bertone.

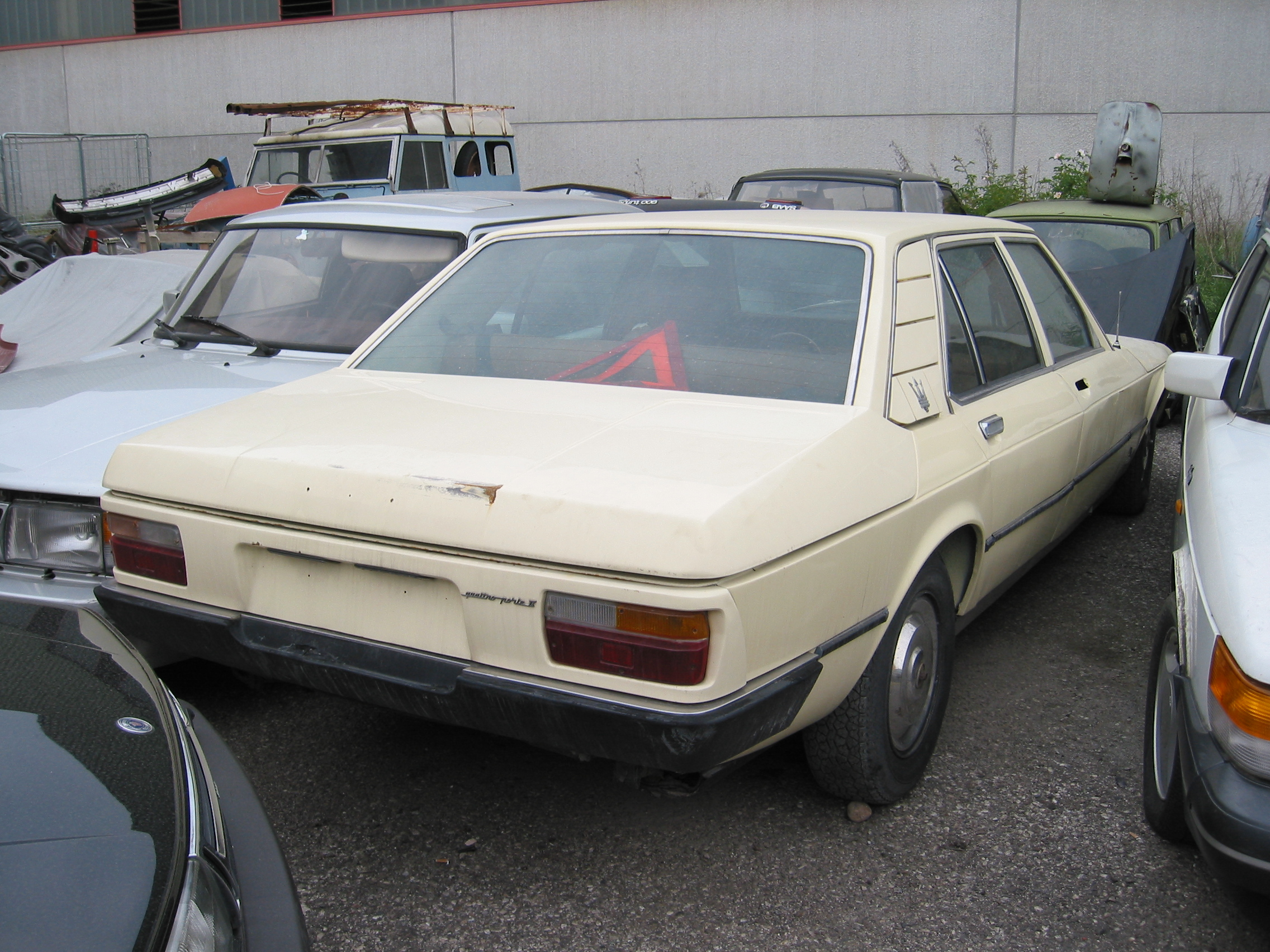
Quattroporte II rear view

Maserati had planned to equip Quattroporte II with a V8 engine, but the Tipo 107 V8 engine was too large for the Citroën SM based chassis on top of being too obsolete. A prototype for a 4.0-litre V8 engine was built from two compact Citroën-Maserati V6 engines. Maserati cut through the rear cylinders in half on one block (2.5 cylinders per bank, discarding the rear) and the middle cylinders in half on another block (1.5 cylinders per bank, discarding the front) then welded the blocks together. The output was an estimated 190 kW (260 PS; 250 hp). The new V8 engine was fitted to the Citroën SM for durability testing which lasted for 17,000 km (10,563 miles). This was done to prove that the chassis was robust enough to handle the additional power of the larger engine. Alejandro de Tomaso, the Italian entrepreneur who took over Maserati in 1975, cancelled the V8 engine programme.

A single running prototype of the Quattroporte II was built and tested in 1974. The 1973 oil crisis and the collapse of Citroën's finances in 1974 prevented Maserati from gaining the EEC approval for the European market. The production did not commence until 1976, and each Quattroporte II was built to order and sold in the Middle East and Spain where the type approval was not needed. Only twelve production cars were built from 1976 to 1978.

The engineering and development had cost Maserati about four billion lire by the time the production ended in 1978.

== Quattroporte III/Royale (AM330, 1979–1990) ==
Third generation
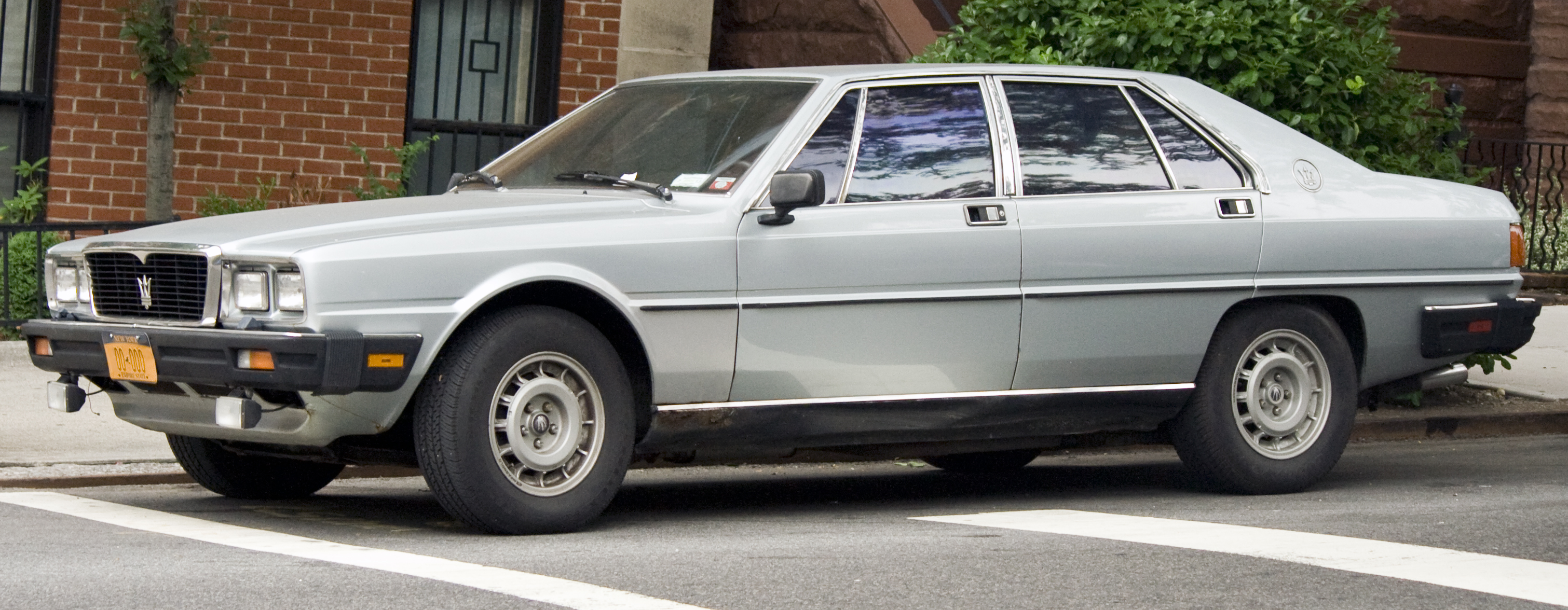

Overview
- Also called: Maserati 4porte; Maserati Royale
- Production: 1979–1990
- Designer: Giorgetto Giugiaro at Italdesign

Body and chassis
- Layout: Front-engine, rear-wheel-drive
- Related: Maserati Kyalami; De Tomaso Deauville

Powertrain
- Engine: 4.2 L Tipo 107.21 V8; 4.9 L Tipo 107.23 V8
- Transmission: 5-speed ZF S5 manual; 3-speed Chrysler A727 automatic

Dimensions
- Wheelbase: 2,800 mm (110.2 in)
- Length: 4,910 mm (193.3 in)
- Width: 1,890 mm (74.4 in)
- Height: 1,385 mm (54.5 in)
- Kerb weight: 1,780 kg (3,924 lb)

The third generation of the Maserati Quattroporte (Tipo AM 330) was developed under the Alejandro de Tomaso-GEPI ownership. After the Citroën-era front-wheel drive Quattroporte II, the third generation returned to rear-wheel drive with an enlarged variation of the Maserati Tipo 107 V8 engine. The exterior was designed by Giorgetto Giugiaro.

=== History ===
From 1974 to 1976, Giorgetto Giugiaro presented two Italdesign show cars on Maserati platforms, called the Medici I and Medici II. The latter had features that would make it into the production version of the third-generation of the Quattroporte.

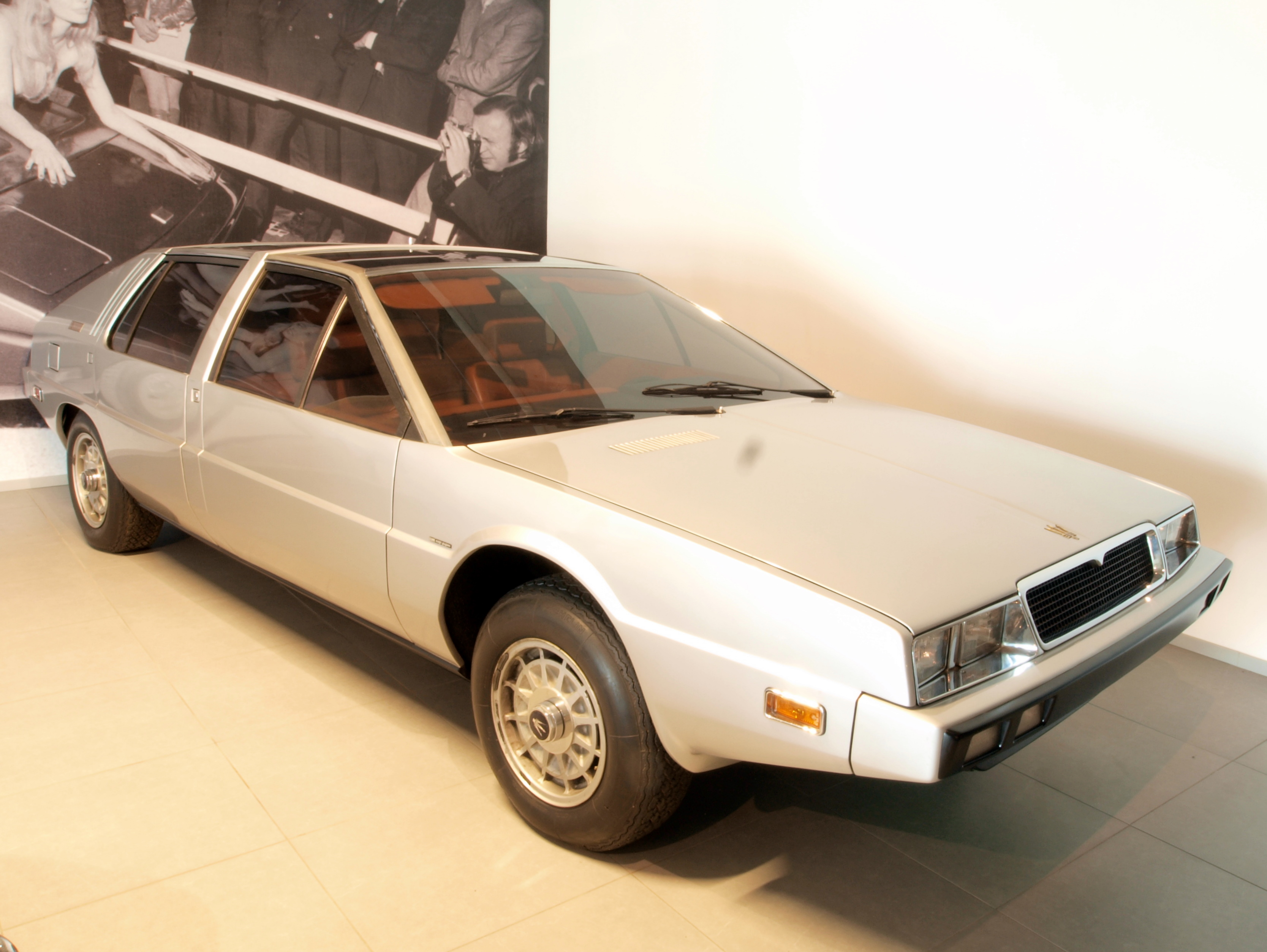
Maserati Medici II

A pre-production Quattroporte was introduced to the press by the then Maserati president Alejandro de Tomaso on 1 November 1976, in advance of its début at the Turin Motor Show later that month. It was only three years later though, in 1979, that the production version of the car went on sale. De Tomaso, who disliked Citroën, removed all of the influence of the French marque from the car. The quad-cam V8 engines built since 1963 were used in a stretched version of the Maserati Kyalami chassis. The SM V8 engine prototype under development in the Citroën ownership was also scrapped and the staff was replaced, the most notable being head engineer Giulio Alfieri who was replaced by Aurelio Bertocchi. The hydraulic system of the Quattroporte II was replaced by a conventional power steering setup and the suspension geometry was akin to the Jaguar XJ.

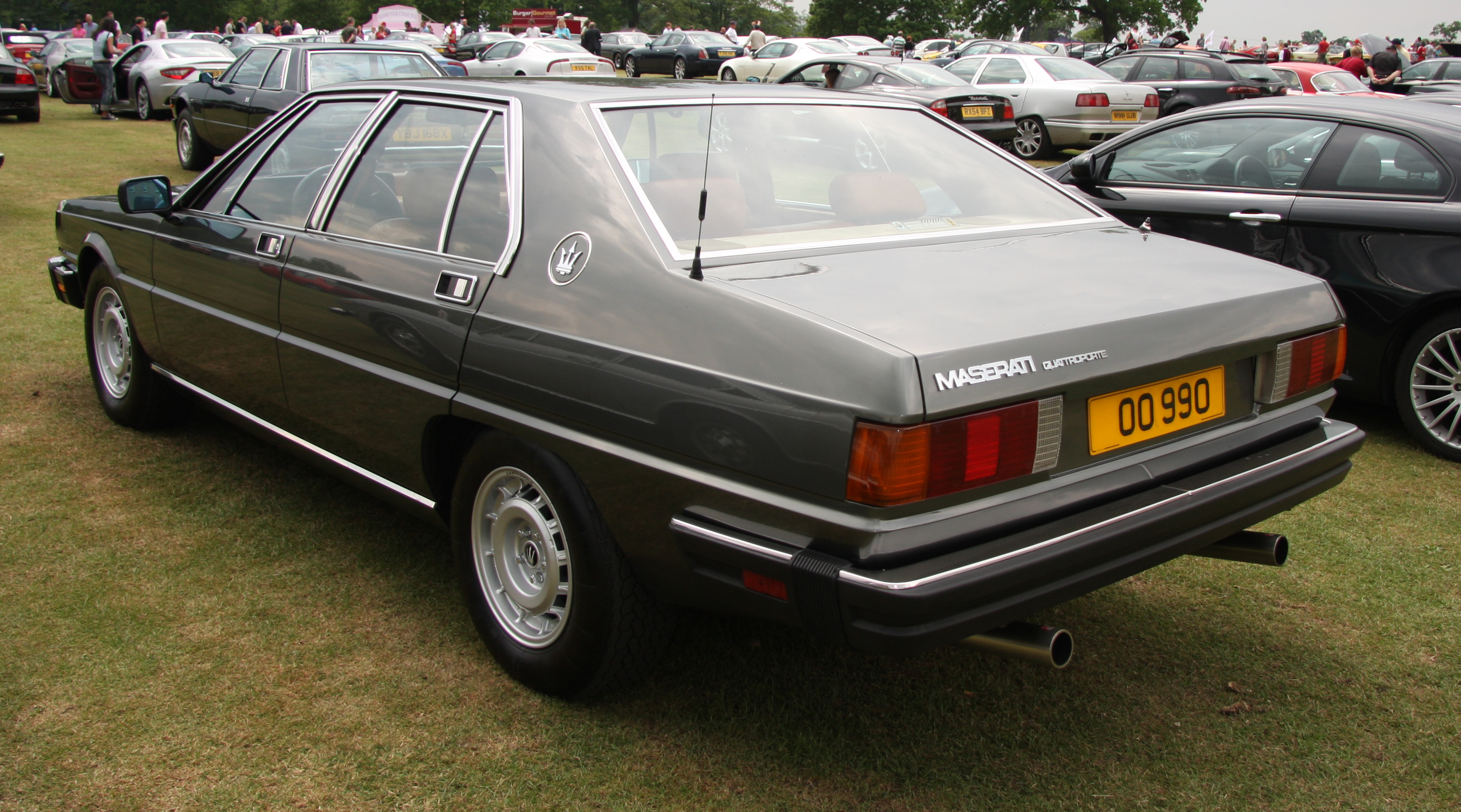
Rear view

Initially badging reading "4PORTE" was used, but this was changed in 1981 to ones spelling out "Quattroporte". Two versions of the V8 engine were available: a 4,930 cc (4.9 L) version generating a maximum power output of 280 PS (206 kW; 276 hp), and a smaller built-to-order 4,136 cc (4.1 L) engine generating 255 PS (188 kW; 252 hp), which was phased out in 1981. The interior was upholstered in leather and trimmed in briar wood. The climate controls came from the Mopar parts bin on early US-spec cars. In 1984, the climate control system was upgraded to share parts with the mass produced Biturbo.

The Quattroporte III marked the last of the hand-built Italian cars; all exterior joints and seams were filled to give a seamless appearance. From 1987 onwards, the Royale superseded the Quattroporte. The Quattroporte III was an instant success and 120 units were sold in Italy in 1980 alone.

==== Maserati Royale ====
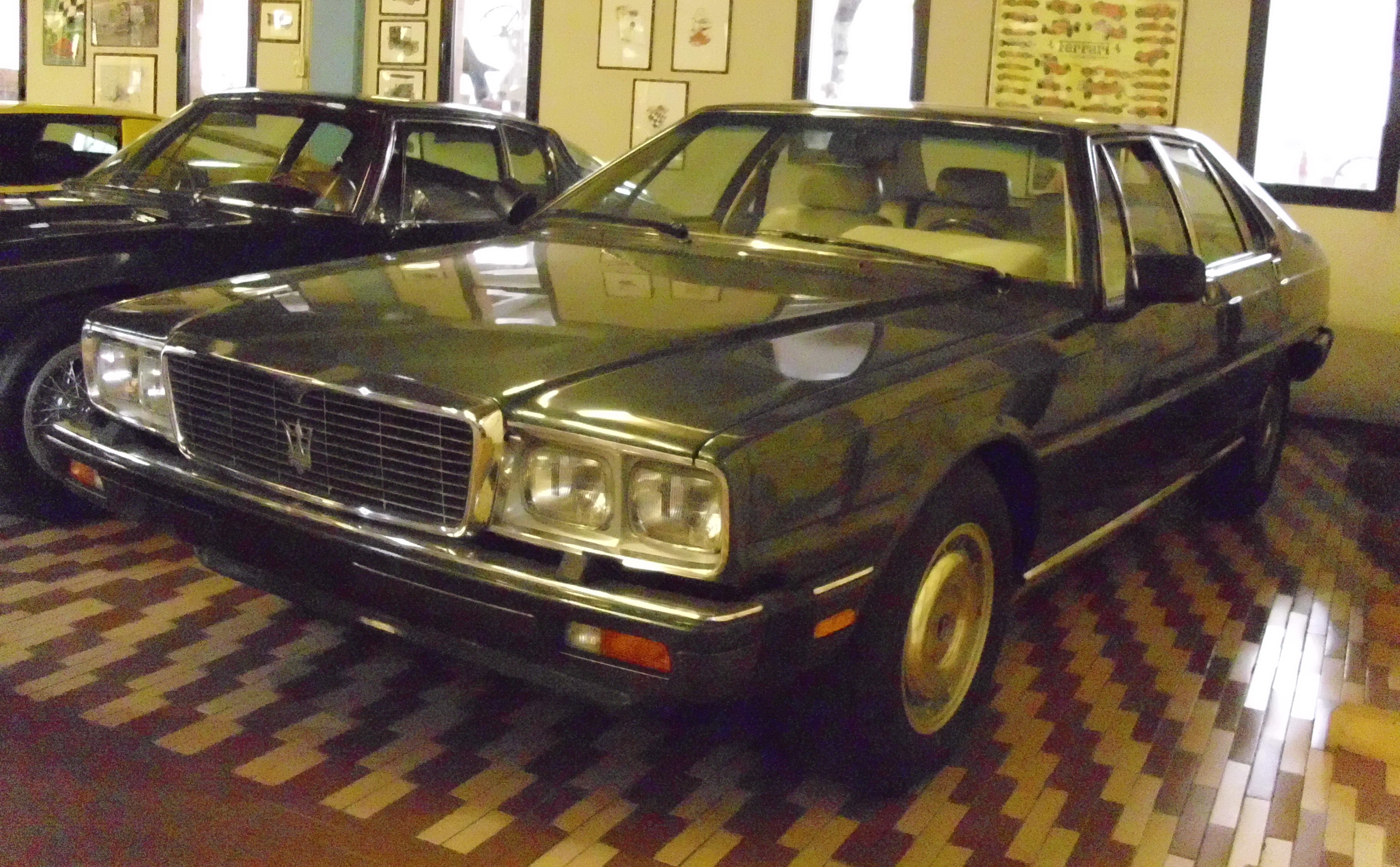
Maserati Royale

On 14 December 1986, at Maserati's 60th anniversary as a car manufacturer, De Tomaso presented the Maserati Royale in Modena, a built-to-order, ultra-luxury version of the Quattroporte. It featured a higher compression 4.9-litre V8 engine, generating a maximum power output of 300 PS (221 kW; 296 bhp). Besides the usual leather upholstery and veneer trim, the car featured a revised dashboard with an analogue clock, four electrically adjustable seats, retractable veneered tables in the rear doors, and a mini-bar. Visually, the Royale was distinguished by new disc-shaped alloy wheels and silver-coloured side sills. A limited production run of 120 cars was announced, but when production ceased in 1990 only 53 cars were completed.

In all, including the Royale, production of the Quattroporte III amounted to 2,155 units in total.

=== Specifications ===
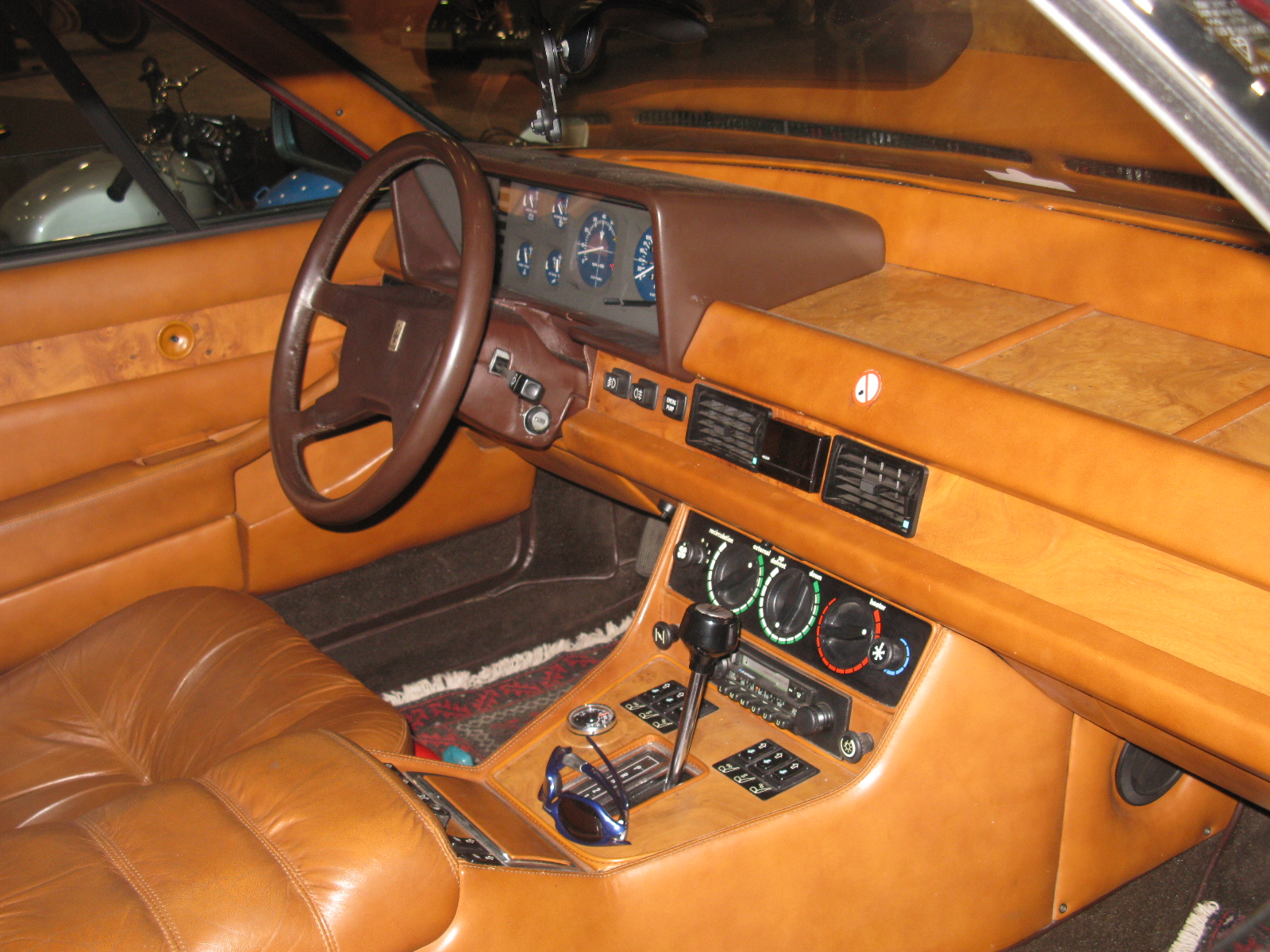
Interior

The Quattroporte III utilised an all-steel unibody structure. The chassis was related to that of the Kyalami, in turn derived from the De Tomaso Longchamp and therefore ultimately related to the De Tomaso Deauville luxury saloon. Front suspension was of the double wishbone type, with single coaxial dampers and coil springs and an anti-roll bar. The rear axle used a peculiar layout very similar to Jaguar independent rear suspension. Each cast aluminium hub carrier was linked to the chassis only by a single lower wishbone, the half shafts doubling as upper control arms, and was sprung by twin coaxial dampers and coil springs units. Rear brakes were mounted inboard, the callipers were bolted directly to the housing of the differential. The entire assembly was supported by a bushing-insulated crossbeam. Initially a Salisbury-type limited-slip differential was used; in 1984 it was replaced by a more advanced Gleason-licensed Torsen—or "Sensitork" in Maserati parlance.

The engine was an evolution of Maserati's own all-aluminium, quad overhead cam V8, fed by four Weber carburetors. The automatic transmission used was a three-speed Chrysler A727 "Torqueflite" gearbox. The manual gearboxes are ZF S5 five speed units. When leaving the factory all the cars were originally fitted with Pirelli Cinturato 205VR15 tyres (CN72).

Model	Engine type	Engine	Peak power	Peak torque	Top speed
Quattroporte 4200	107.21.42	4136 cc 90° V8	255 PS (188 kW; 252 hp) at 6000 rpm	350 N⋅m (258 lb⋅ft) at 3200 rpm	—
Quattroporte 4900	107.23.49	4930 cc 90° V8	280 PS (206 kW; 276 hp) at 5600 rpm	390 N⋅m (288 lb⋅ft) at 3000 rpm	230 km/h (143 mph); 223 km/h (139 mph)*
Royale	107.23.50	4930 cc 90° V8	300 PS (221 kW; 296 hp) at 5600 rpm	400 N⋅m (295 lb⋅ft)	236 km/h (147 mph); 229 km/h (142 mph)*
* with automatic transmission

=== Coachbuilders ===
Milanese coachbuilder Carrozzeria Pavesi outfitted several armoured Quattroportes during the 1980s. One of them, a 1983 Blu Sera example nicknamed Calliope, was notably used by President of the Italian Republic Sandro Pertini as the official state car during his tenure.

Autocostruzioni SD of Turinese coachbuilder Salvatore Diomante also offered a 65 cm longer limousine version, fully equipped with white leather, "abundant burr walnut", mini-bar, video cassette player and many other features. The price of the Diomante limousine at its introduction in 1986 was 210 million lire.

== Quattroporte IV (AM337 1994–2001) ==
Fourth generation
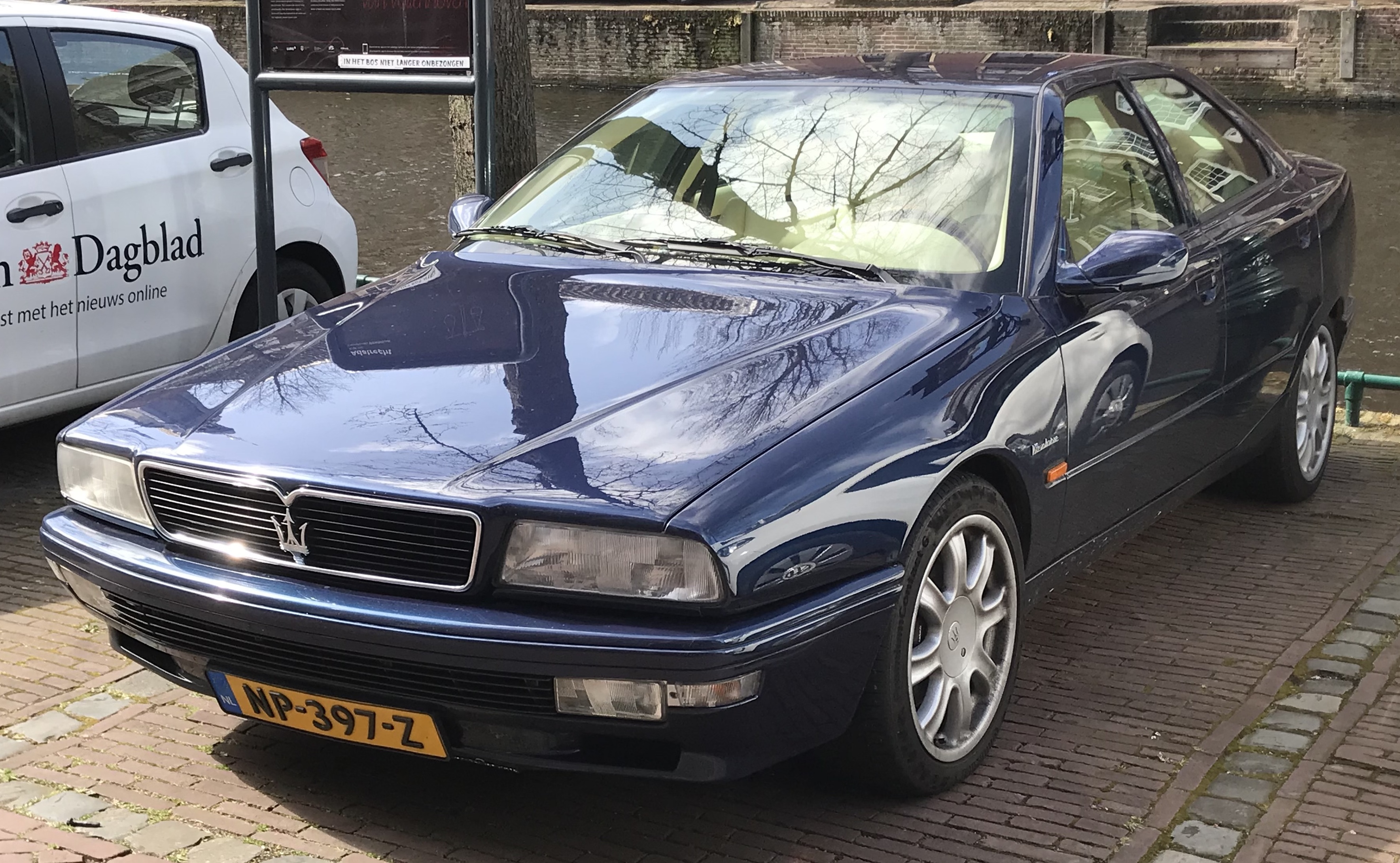
- Maserati Quattroporte Evoluzione

Overview
- Production: 1994 – May 2001
- Designer: Marcello Gandini

Body and chassis
- Layout: Front-engine, rear-wheel-drive
- Platform: Maserati Biturbo
- Related: Maserati Ghibli (AM336); Maserati Shamal

Powertrain
- Engine: 2.0 L AM573 twin-turbo V6; 2.8 L AM574 twin-turbo V6; 3.2 L AM578 twin-turbo V8
- Transmission: 6-speed Getrag 266 manual; 4-speed ZF 4HP22 automatic; 4-speed BTR M72LE automatic

Dimensions
- Wheelbase: 2,650 mm (104.3 in)
- Length: 4,550 mm (179.1 in)
- Width: 1,810 mm (71.3 in)
- Height: 1,380 mm (54.3 in)
- Kerb weight: 1,543–1,675 kg (3,402–3,693 lb)

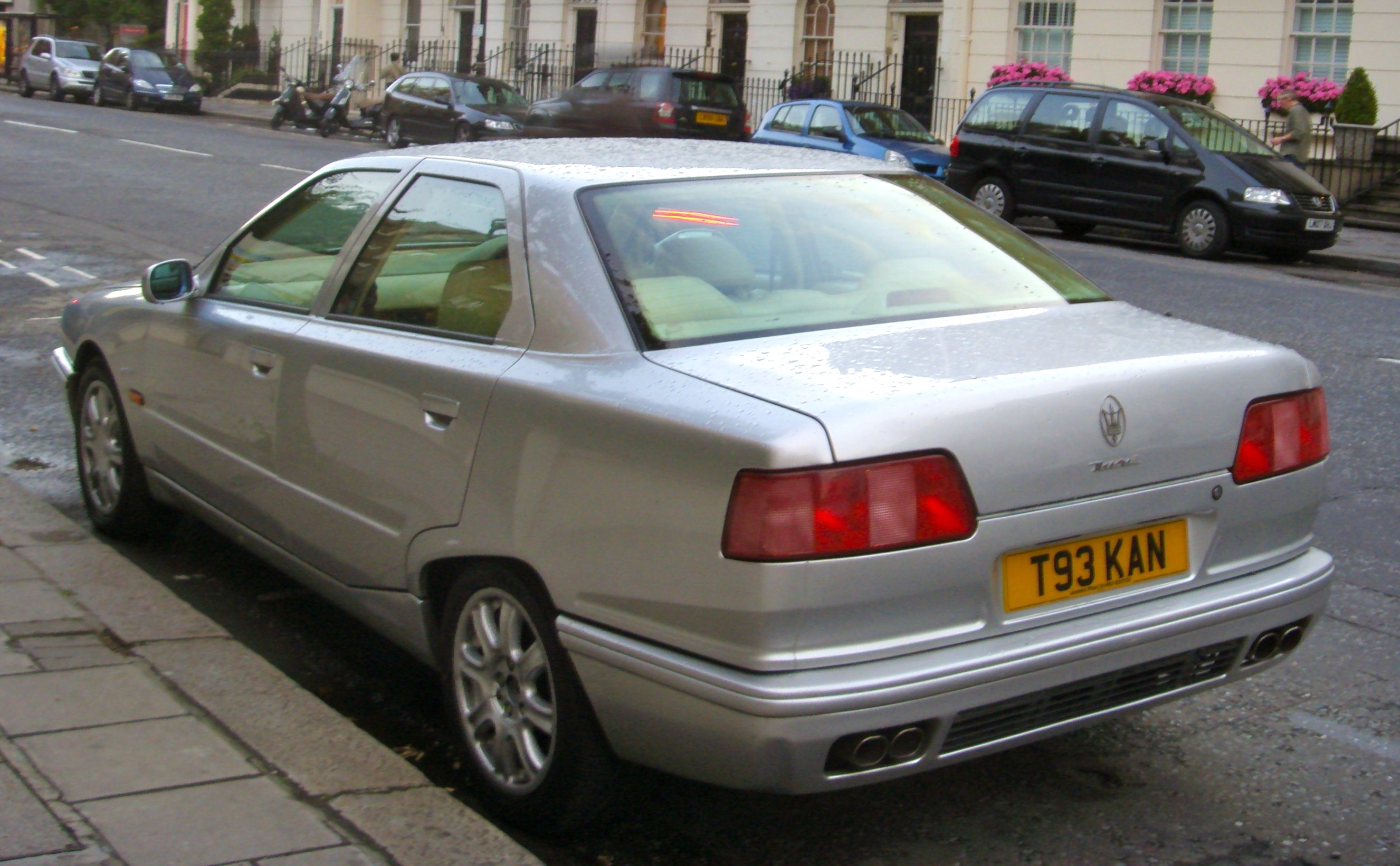
Quattroporte Evoluzione (rear view)

The fourth generation of the Quattroporte (Tipo AM337) was manufactured from 1994 to 2001 and was the first car to be produced under the Fiat ownership after Alejandro de Tomaso sold his entire holding to the Italian marque in 1993. It was built on an evolved and stretched (by 5 cm) version of the Biturbo saloon's architecture, and used the twin-turbocharged V6 and later the new AM578 V8 engine from the Shamal flagship grand tourer. For this reason, the car retained very compact exterior dimensions, and is smaller than any of its predecessors and successors. As the designer's signature angular rear wheel arches gave away, the wedge-shaped aerodynamic (Cd=0.31) body was penned by Marcello Gandini.

=== History ===
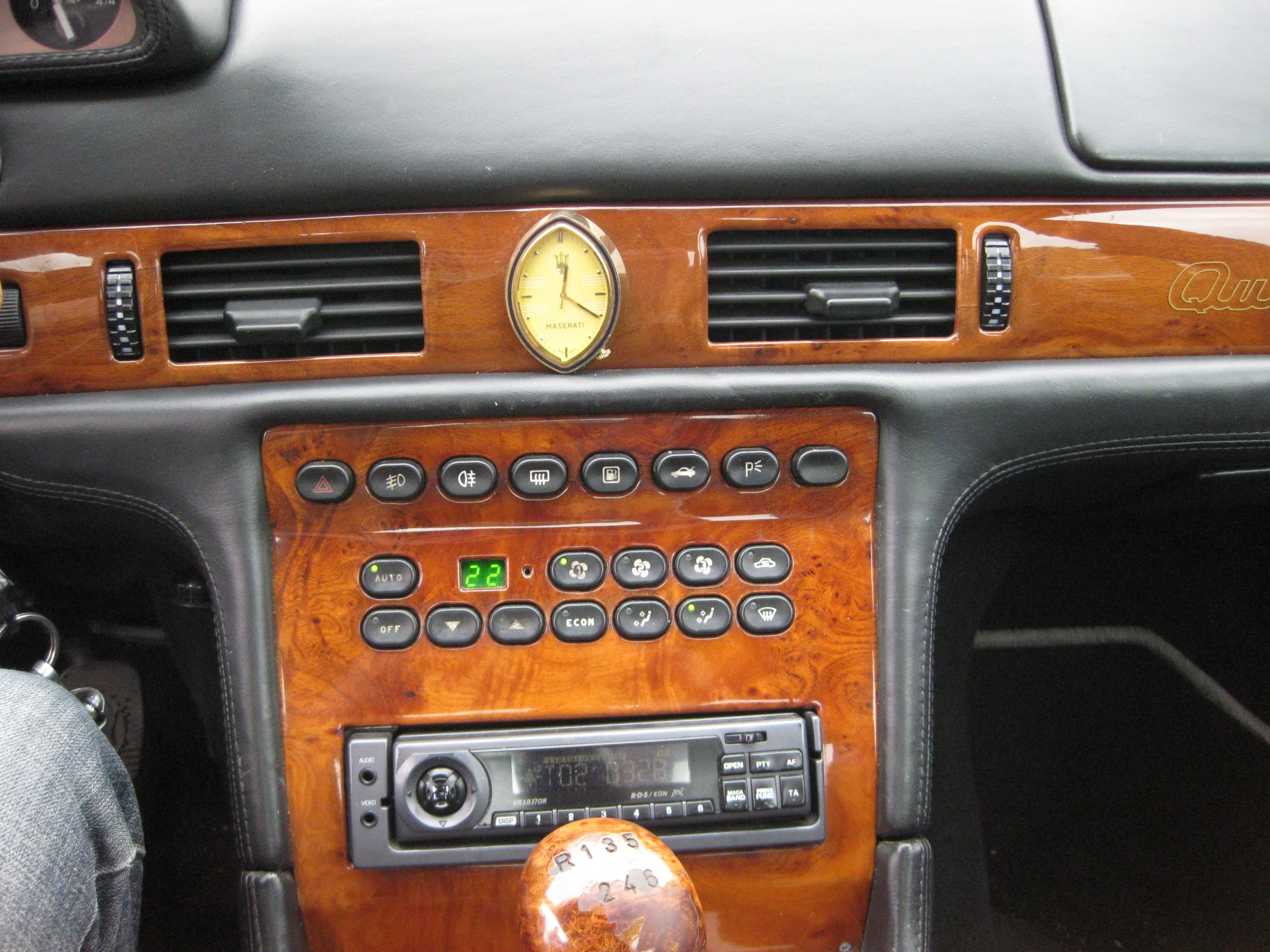
The distinctive Maserati clock, shaped like a vesica piscis, on an earlier Quattroporte IV

The world première of the fourth generation of the Quattroporte took place at the April 1994 Turin Motor Show and the car went on sale towards the end of the year. Initially the Quattroporte was powered by the twin-turbocharged, 24-valve V6 engines from the Ghibli. For export markets there was a 2.8-litre unit, generating a maximum power output of 284 PS (209 kW; 280 hp) and allowing the car to attain a claimed top speed of 255 km/h (158 mph). As local taxation strongly penalised cars over two-litre in displacement, Italian buyers were offered a 2.0-litre version, which developed a little more power (287 PS [211 kW]) but less torque than the 2.8-litre version; on the home market, the 2.8 was not offered until a year after its introduction.

The cabin was fully upholstered in Connolly leather and trimmed in elm burl wood veneer. Weight was also reduced by at least 300 kg (661 lb) as compared to the Quattroporte III primarily due to the compact Biturbo underpinnings and by the use of a compact powerplant.

After having been displayed in December 1995 at the Bologna Motor Show, a 3.2-litre twin-turbocharged V8 Quattroporte was added to the range in 1996: the new AM578 engine, an evolution of the Shamal V8, generated a maximum power output of 335 PS (247 kW; 330 hp). The top speed was claimed to be 270 km/h (168 mph). At the same time, some minor updates were introduced on all models: new eight-spoke alloy wheels and aerodynamic wing mirrors, and seicilindri or ottocilindri (Italian for "six" and "eight-cylinders" respectively) badges on the front fenders, denoting which engine was under the bonnet.

As standard, all the three engines were mated to a Getrag 6-speed manual transmission, while 4-speed automatic transmissions were available on request with the 2.8 and 3.2 engines respectively—4HP22 by ZF Friedrichshafen and a computer-controlled transmission supplied by an Australian firm BTR.

In July 1997, Fiat's subsidiary Ferrari acquired a 50% controlling stake in Maserati S.p.A.. Ferrari immediately undertook a renewal of Maserati's dated production facilities, as well as made improvements to the manufacturing methods and quality control.

The steps taken by the new parent company resulted in the improved Quattroporte Evoluzione which was introduced at the March 1998 Geneva Motor Show. It featured 400 all-new or modified parts out of a total 800 main components. Powertrains and performance remained unvaried, save for the adoption of the same BTR transmission from the 3.2 V8 for the automatic 2.8 V6 model. The Evoluzione no longer had the oval Maserati clock on the dashboard and had redesigned wing mirrors. Ferrari management decided to drop the 2.0 L V6 from the Evoluzione lineup, when they were offered alongside the new 3200 GT, and so the new cars were distinguished from the earlier models by V6 evoluzione or V8 evoluzione badges on the front fenders. Production of the fourth generation of the Quattroporte ended in May 2001 and 2,400 units were made in total with 730 being the Evoluzione versions.

Japanese importer Cornes & Co. ordered a special numbered edition of the Quattroporte for their customers. Cornes Serie Speciale were the last cars built and were limited to only 50 examples. Available in both V6 and V8 Evoluzione variants, all were equipped with the automatic transmission. This special edition is the only Quattroporte to have a Maserati badge inserted into the C-door-pillar. Even though other Evoluziones had the Lassale clock replaced with the Maserati trident, this edition retained the original timepiece.

=== Specifications ===
The Quattroporte is a four-door, five-seater saloon with a steel unibody construction. The overall layout remained unchanged from the Biturbo from which the car descended: longitudinal front engine, rear-wheel drive, all-independent suspension with MacPherson struts upfront and trailing arms at the rear. Despite these similarities, the suspension had been re-engineered: rear trailing arms had a tube framework structure like on the Shamal, together with the limited-slip differential. These two components were attached to the body via a newly-designed tubular subframe.

==== Engines ====
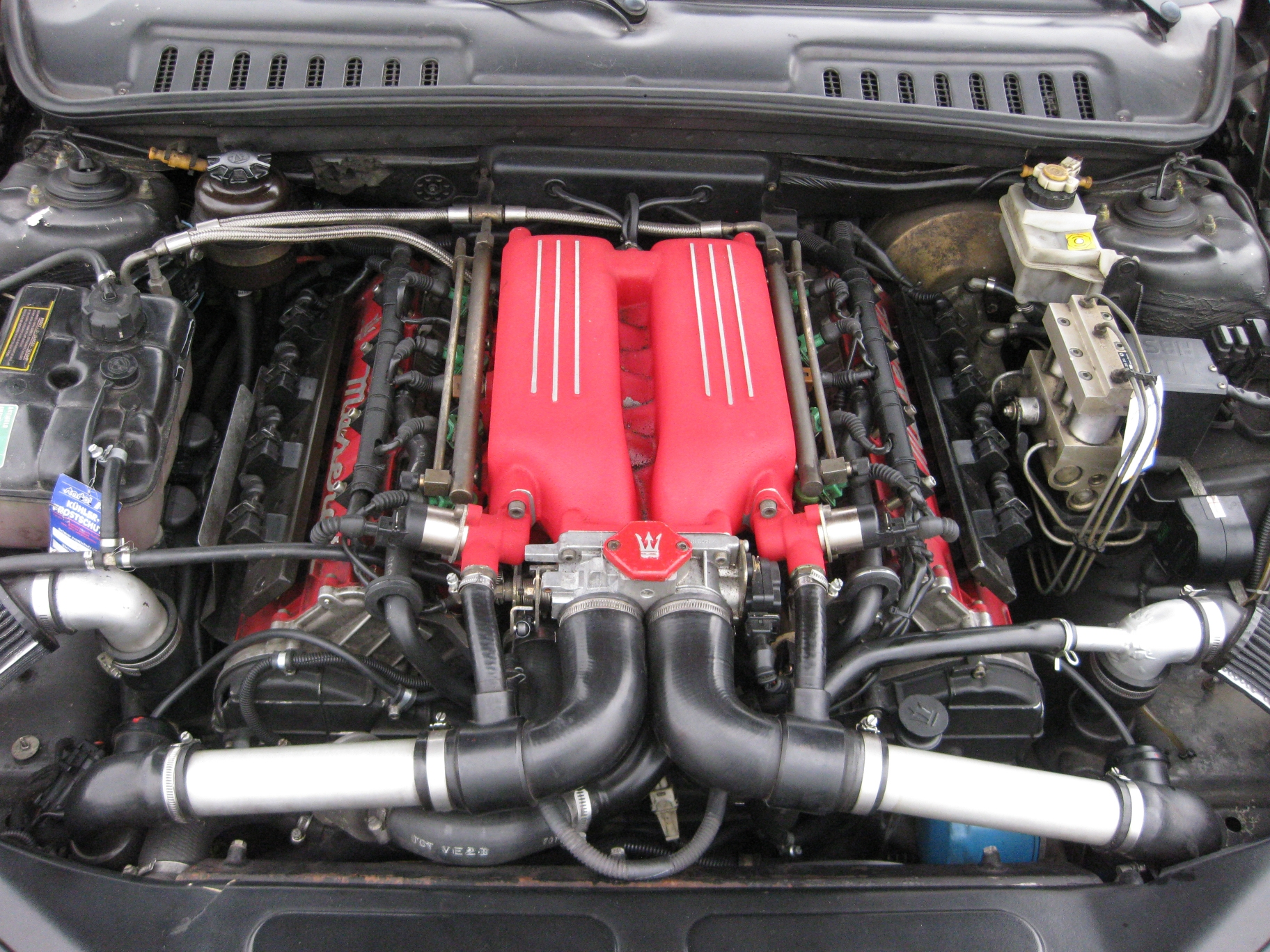
The 3.2-litre twin-turbocharged AM578 V8 engine

Model	Production period	Units produced	Engine	Designation	Peak power	Peak torque	Top speed	Acceleration 0–100 km/h (seconds)
Quattroporte seicilindri 2.0	1994–1998	587	1,996 cc 90° V6	AM573	287 PS (211 kW; 283 hp) at 6,500 rpm	362 N⋅m (267 lb⋅ft) at 4,250 rpm	260 km/h (162 mph)	5.9
Quattroporte seicilindri 2.8	1994–1998	668	2,790 cc 90° V6	AM574	284 PS (209 kW; 280 hp) at 6,000 rpm	413 N⋅m (305 lb⋅ft) at 3,500 rpm	260 km/h (162 mph); 255 km/h (158 mph) (automatic)	5.9
Quattroporte V6 Evoluzione 2.8	1998–2001	390	2,790 cc 90° V6	AM574	280 PS (206 kW; 276 hp) at 6,000 rpm	397 N⋅m (293 lb⋅ft) at 3,500 rpm	260 km/h (162 mph); 255 km/h (158 mph) (automatic)	5.9
Quattroporte ottocilindri 3.2	1996–1998	415	3,217 cc 90° V8	AM578	335 PS (246 kW; 330 hp) at 6,400 rpm	450 N⋅m (332 lb⋅ft) at 4,400 rpm	270 km/h (168 mph); 265 km/h (165 mph) (automatic)	5.8
Quattroporte V8 Evoluzione 3.2	1998–2001	340	3,217 cc 90° V8	AM578	335 PS (246 kW; 330 hp) at 6,400 rpm	450 N⋅m (332 lb⋅ft) at 4,400 rpm	270 km/h (168 mph); 265 km/h (165 mph) (automatic)	5.8
Total	1994–2001	2,400						

== Quattroporte V (M139, 2003–2012) ==
Fifth generation
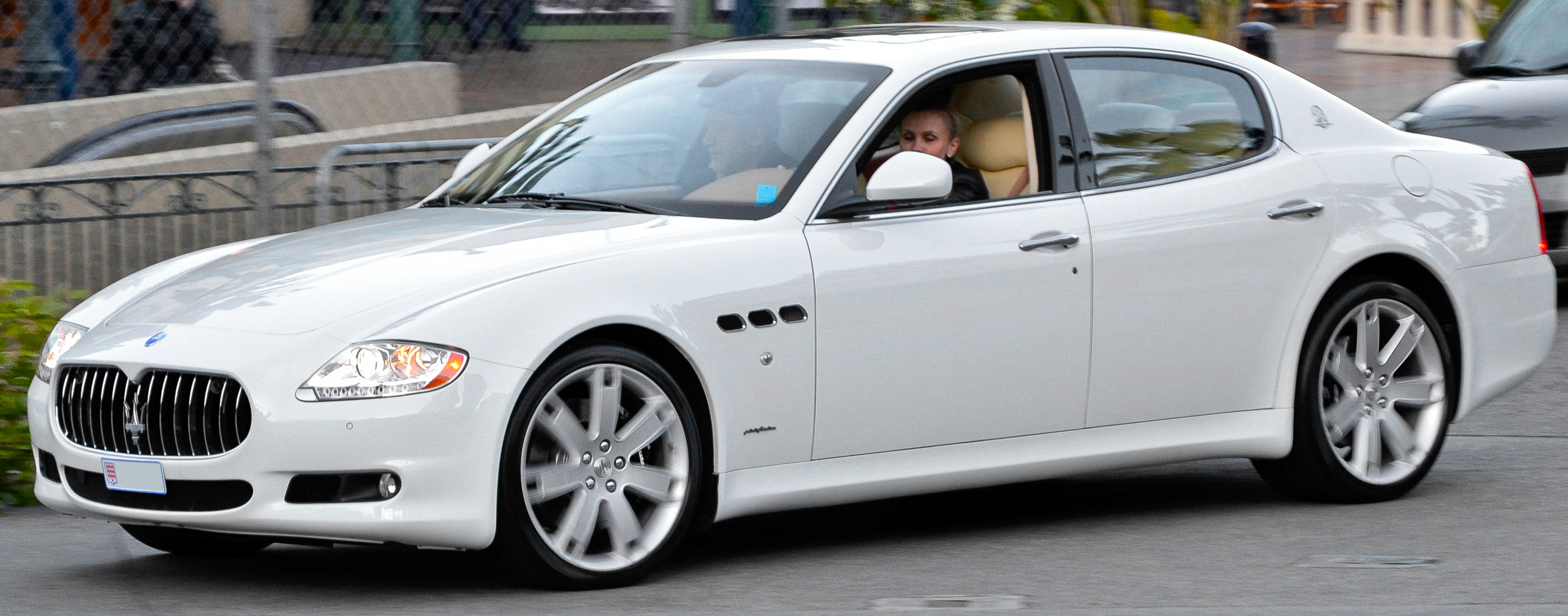
- Maserati Quattroporte (post-facelift)

Overview
- Production: July 2003–2012
- Designer: Ken Okuyama at Pininfarina

Body and chassis
- Layout: Front-mid-engine, rear-wheel-drive
- Platform: Maserati M139
- Related: Maserati GranTurismo; Maserati GranCabrio; Alfa Romeo 8C Competizione

Powertrain
- Engine: 4.2 L Ferrari F136 S/U V8; 4.7 L Ferrari F136 Y V8
- Transmission: 6-speed Graziano DuoSelect automated manual; 6-speed ZF 6HP26 automatic

Dimensions
- Wheelbase: 3,064 mm (120.6 in)
- Length: 5,052 mm (198.9 in) (2003–2008); 5,097 mm (200.7 in) (2008–2012)
- Width: 1,895 mm (74.6 in)
- Height: 1,423–1,438 mm (56.0–56.6 in)
- Kerb weight: 1,930 kg (4,255 lb) (DuoSelect); 1,990 kg (4,387 lb) (automatic)

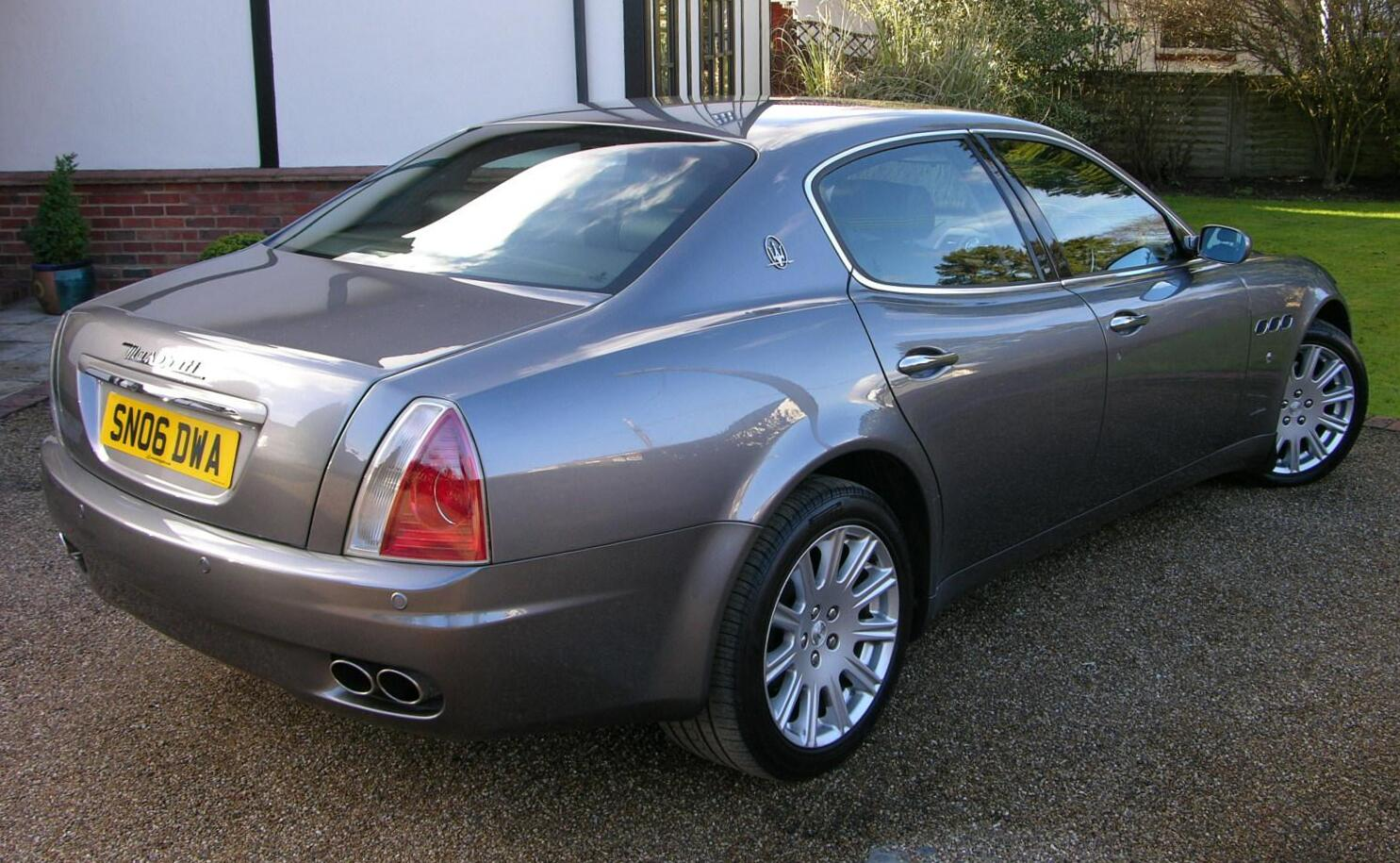
Maserati Quattroporte (pre-facelift)

The fifth generation of the Quattroporte (Tipo M139) debuted at the Frankfurt Motor Show on 9 September 2003 and made its U.S. première at the 2003 Pebble Beach Concours d'Elegance; production started in 2003. Exterior and interior design was penned by Pininfarina's then chief designer Ken Okuyama. The last M139 Quattroporte was built on 20 December 2012.

Built on an entirely new platform named the M139, it was 50 cm (19.7 in) longer than its predecessor and sat on a 40 cm (15.7 in) longer wheelbase. The same architecture would later underpin the GranTurismo and GranCabrio coupés and convertibles.

Initially, the Quattroporte was powered by an evolution of the naturally aspirated dry sump 4.2-litre V8 engine, as used in the Maserati Coupé, with an increased power output of 400 PS (294 kW; 395 hp) and new black plastic inlet manifold instead of an aluminium cast one. Due to its greater weight compared to the Coupé and Spyder, the 0–100 km/h (0–62 mph) acceleration time for the Quattroporte is 5.2 seconds and the top speed is measured at 275 km/h (171 mph).

Over 5,000 cars were built in 2006.

=== History ===
==== 2003–2008 ====
The Maserati Quattroporte was initially offered in only one configuration, equipped with an automated manual transmission, marketed as DuoSelect. The base Quattroporte DuoSelect featured a chrome grille with horizontal slats, adaptive suspension, marketed as Skyhook and 330 mm brake disks with four piston calipers at each wheel. Maserati offered fifteen exterior paint colours, Poltrona Frau leather upholstery in ten colours, contrasting seat piping and stitching and three types of wood inserts.

In 2004, the American luxury department store Neiman Marcus offered a limited edition of the Quattroporte, only available for order through the retailer's 2004 Christmas Catalog at a price of 125,000 USD. Each of the 60 Neiman Marcus Quattroportes was finished in Bordeaux Pontevecchio (wine red) exterior colour and featured a chrome mesh-front grille along with side vents and 19-inch ball-polished wheels. The interior was upholstered in ivory Poltrona Frau leather accented with Bordeaux piping and mahogany wood trim.

At the Frankfurt Motor Show in September 2005, Maserati introduced two different trim levels for the Quattroporte, the Executive GT and Sport GT.

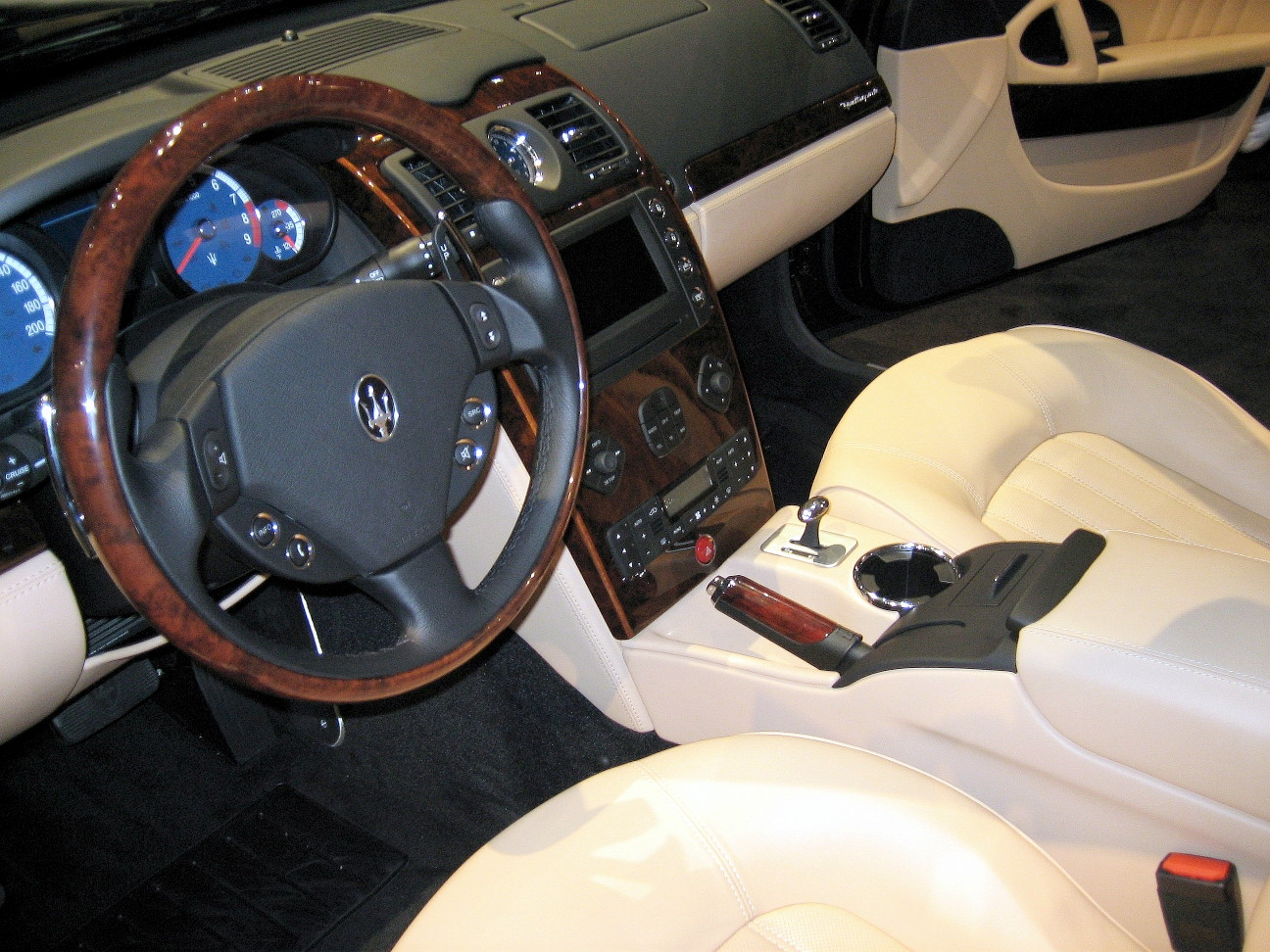
Interior of a Quattroporte Executive GT

The Quattroporte Executive GT was a comfort and luxury-oriented specification; it came equipped with a wood-rimmed steering wheel, an Alcantara-suede interior roof lining; ventilated, adaptive, massaging rear seats, rear air conditioning controls, veneered retractable rear tables, and curtain shades on the rear windows. The exterior was distinguished by 19 inch eight-spoke ball-polished alloy wheels and chrome mesh front and side grilles.

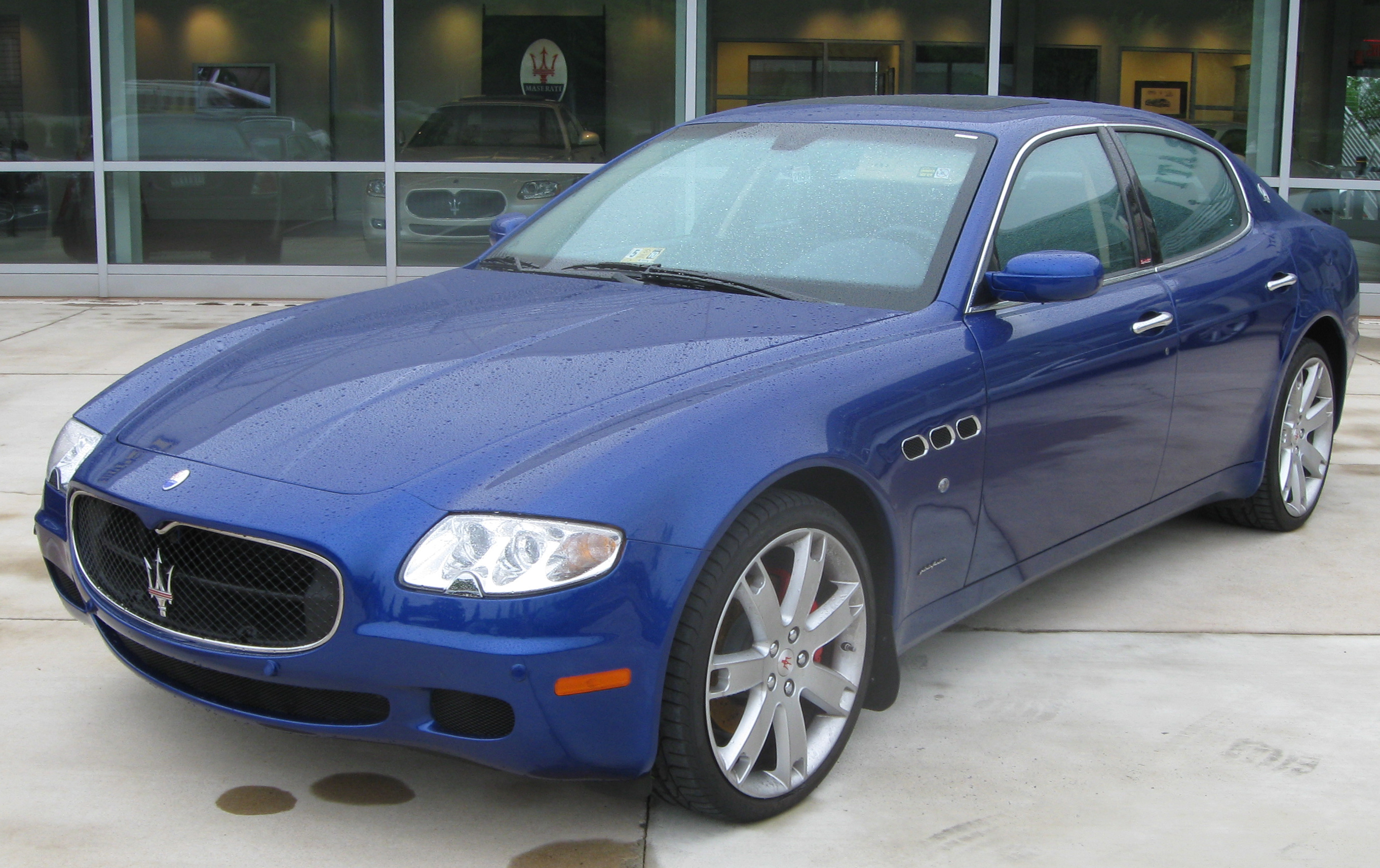
Maserati Quattroporte Sport GT

The Quattroporte Sport GT variant offered several performance upgrades: a re-configured transmission providing faster gearshifts and a firmer Skyhook suspension system; courtesy of new software calibrations, seven-spoke 20 inch wheels with low-profile tyres, cross-drilled brake rotors, and braided brake lines. Model-specific exterior trim included dark mesh front and side grilles and red accents to the Trident badges, as on vintage racing Maserati models. Inside, there were aluminium pedals, a sport steering wheel and carbon fibre in place of the standard wood inserts.

A new 6-speed ZF-supplied automatic transmission was presented at the Detroit Motor Show in January 2007, with the first cars delivered right after the launch, marketed as Maserati Quattroporte Automatica. As all the three trim levels were offered in both DuoSelect and Automatica versions, the lineup grew to six models.

The Quattroporte Sport GT S was introduced at the Frankfurt Motor Show in September 2007. Taking further the Sport GT's focus on handling, this version employed Bilstein single-rate dampers in place of the Skyhook adaptive system. Other changes from the Sport GT were a lowered ride height and 10 mm wider 295/30 rear tyres, front Brembo iron/aluminium dual-cast brake rotors and red-painted six-piston callipers. The cabin was upholstered in mixed Alcantara and leather, with carbon fibre accents; on the exterior, the door handles were painted in body colour and the 20 inch wheels and the exhaust pipes were finished in a "dark chrome" shade.

At the 2008 North American International Auto Show, Maserati launched the Quattroporte Collezione Cento, a special edition of the Quattroporte limited to 100 examples. Its unique specification featured an ivory paint colour with a waist coachline, matched to Cuoio tan tufted leather upholstery and Wengé trim inlaid with mother of pearl. Standard equipment comprised most of the available infotainment options.

==== 2008–2012 facelift ====
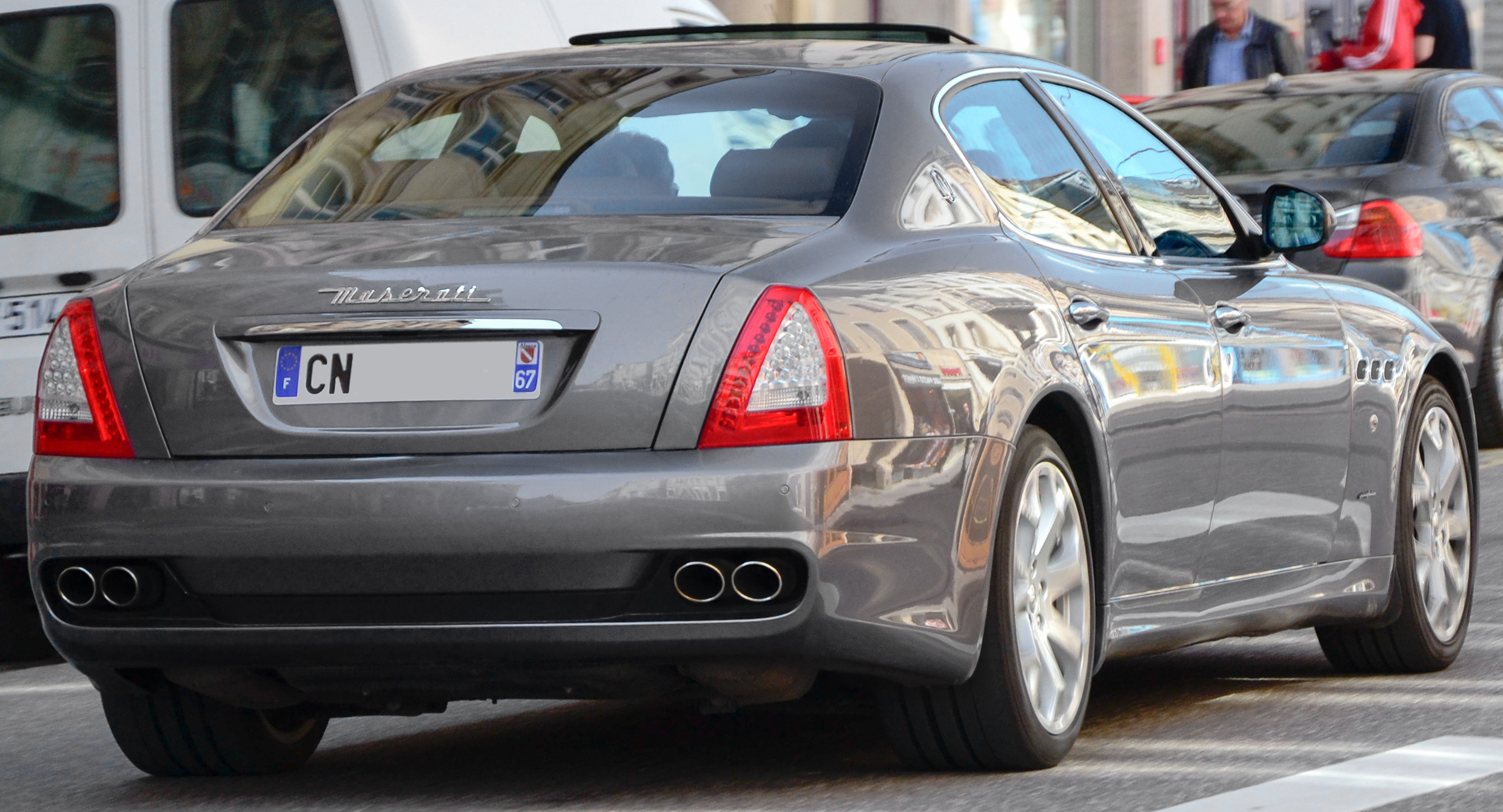
Rear view (post facelift)

The facelift Quattroporte débuted at the 2008 Geneva Motor Show. Overseen by Pininfarina, the facelift featured redesigned bumpers, side sills and wing mirrors (the latter carried over from the GranTurismo), a convex front grille with vertical bars instead of horizontal, new headlights and tail lights with directional bi-xenon main beams and LED turn signals. Inside there was a new navigation and entertainment system. All Quattroporte models now used the ZF automatic transmission, with the DuoSelect being discontinued.

The 4.2-litre Quattroporte featured single-rate damping comfort-tuned suspension and 18 inch wheels. Debuting alongside was the Quattroporte S, powered by a wet-sump 4.7-litre V8 engine, the same engine utilised in the Maserati GranTurismo S, with a maximum power output of 430 PS (316 kW; 424 hp) and maximum torque of 490 N⋅m (361 lb⋅ft). In conjunction with the engine, the braking system was upgraded to cross-drilled discs on both axles and dual-cast 360 mm rotors with six piston callipers at the front. Skyhook active damping suspension and 19 inch V-spoke wheels were standard. Trim differences from the standard 4.2-litre cars were limited to a chrome instead of a titanium-coloured front grille.

Production of the facelift Quattroporte models started in June 2008.

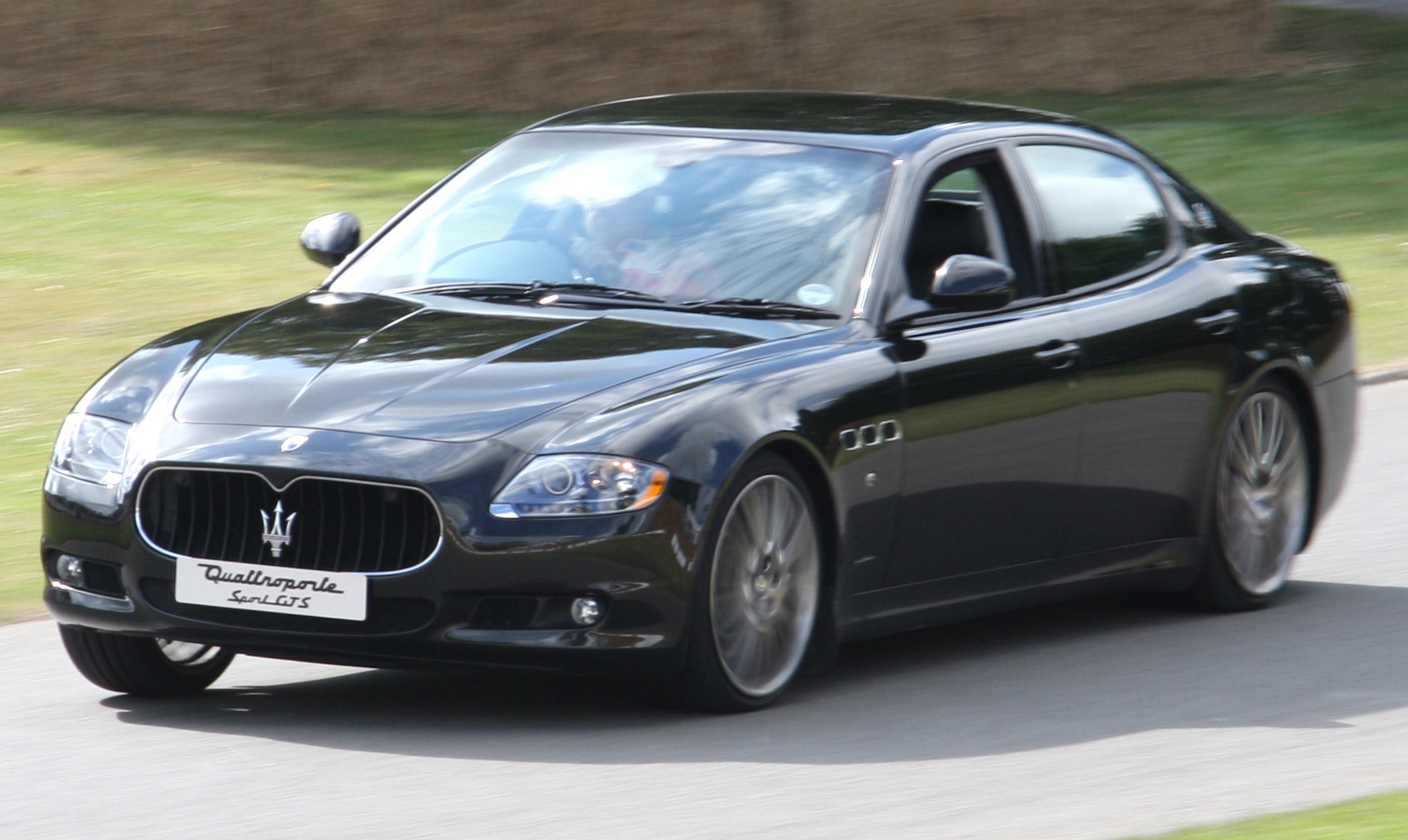
Quattroporte Sport GT S at Goodwood 2009

The Quattroporte Sport GT S premièred at the North American International Auto Show in January 2009. Its 4.7-litre V8 has a maximum power output of 440 PS (324 kW; 434 hp), ten more than the Quattroporte S, owing to a revised intake and a sport exhaust system with electronically actuated bypass valves. Other mechanical changes were made to the suspension system, where the Sport GT S single-rate dampers took place of the Skyhook system, ride height was further lowered and stiffer springs were adopted. The exterior was distinguished by a specific front grille with concave vertical bars, black headlight bezels, red accents on the Trident badges, the absence of chrome window trim, body colour door handles and black double oval exhaust pipes instead of the quad round exhaust pipes found on other Quattroporte models. On the interior, the veneer trim was replaced by "Titan Tex" composite material and the cabin was upholstered in mixed Alcantara and leather.

The Quattroporte Centurion Edition was presented in March 2009 for the UK market. It was special version developed only for the holders of black American Express cards. The car was finished in black exterior colour and with the Centurion logo on the headrests and instrument panel. The engines available were the standard 4.2-litre and 4.7-litre V8.

A special edition of the Quattroporte GT S was introduced at the 2010 Geneva Motor Show: the Quattroporte Sport GT S Awards Edition, celebrating the 56 awards received by the fifth generation of the Quattroporte in just six years since its launch. Its unique specification consisted of "Nero pianoforte" or specially developed pale gold "Quarzo fuso" pearlescent paint, satin grey wheels, polished brake callipers and all chrome trim in a dark finish.

=== Sales ===
Year	Europe
2003	9
2004	1,128
2005	1,306
2006	1,203
2007	1,578
2008	1,106
2009	773
2010	473
2011	279
2012	103
Total	7,598

=== Specifications ===
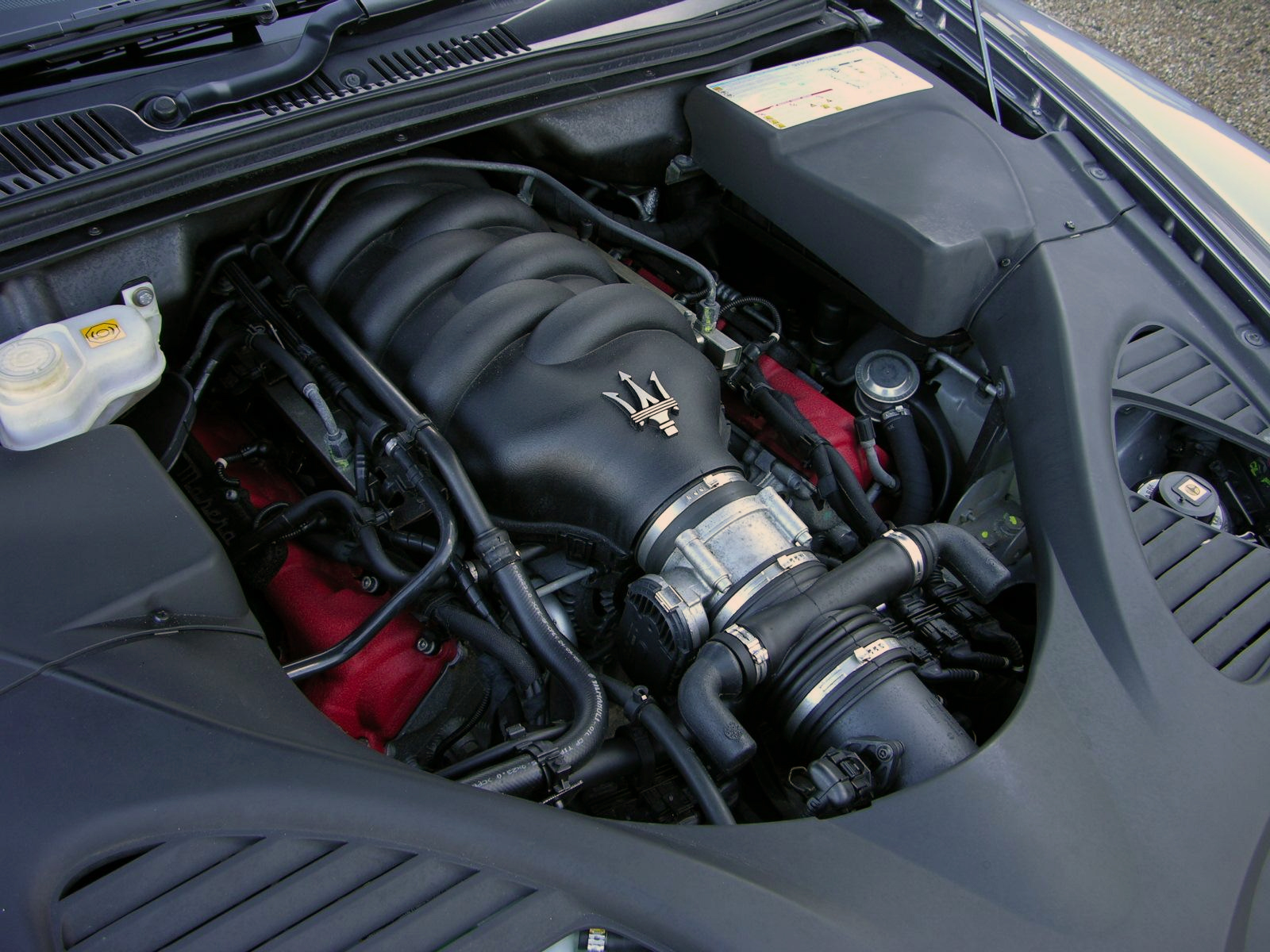
The 4.2-litre dry-sump V8 engine in a DuoSelect car

The Quattroporte's body is a steel unibody, with an aluminium boot lid and engine bonnet; the coefficient of drag is Cd=0.35. Front and rear aluminium subframes support the whole suspension and drivetrain.

A 47%/53% front/rear weight distribution was achieved by setting the engine behind the front axle, inside the wheelbase (front-mid-engine layout) and the adoption of a transaxle layout. With the later automatic transmission—fitted in the conventional position en bloc with the engine—weight distribution changed to 49%/51% front/rear. The suspension system consists of unequal length control arms with forged aluminium arms and hub carriers, coil springs and anti-roll bars on both axles.

==== Transmissions ====
The DuoSelect transmission available at the launch of the fifth generation of the Quattroporte was a development of the Cambiocorsa unit first used in the Maserati Coupé and built by Graziano Trasmissioni. It was a Ferrari-based automated manual transmission, mounted at the rear axle in the block with the differential in a transaxle layout, with the twin-plate dry clutch located in a bell housing attached to the rear of the engine. A torque tube joined rigidly together the two units. Gear shifting was done via the standard paddle shifters behind the steering wheel; there was no gear lever on the centre tunnel, but rather a small T-shaped handle used to quickly engage first gear and reverse when maneuvering at slow speed.

The 6-speed torque converter automatic transmission was a 6HP26 supplied by ZF Friedrichshafen. Unlike the DuoSelect, it was placed in the conventional position right behind the engine; to accommodate it and the new rear differential the front and rear subframes as well as part of the transmission tunnel had to be redesigned. Manual shifting was possible by the centre-console mounted gear lever; in addition, Sport GT cars came equipped with paddle shifters as standard, while on other models they were an optional extra. All Quattroporte models were fitted with a limited-slip differential.

==== Engines ====
The V8 engines of the fifth generation of the Quattroporte belonged to the Ferrari-Maserati F136 family; they had aluminium-silicon alloy block and heads, a crossplane crankshaft, four valves per cylinder driven by two overhead camshafts per bank and continuous variable valve timing on the intake side. F136S 4.2-litre engines in DuoSelect equipped cars used a dry sump lubrication system; F136UC 4.2-litre engines on automatic cars were converted to use a wet sump oiling system, as did the later 4.7-litre, codenamed F136Y.

Model	Production period	Model Year	Production numbers	Engine	Peak power	Peak torque	Top speed	0–100 km/h 0–62 mph (seconds)	CO_{2} emissions (NEDC combined)
Quattroporte DuoSelect	2003–2008	2003–2008	10,639	4244 cc V8	400 PS (294 kW; 395 hp) at 7,000 rpm	451 N⋅m (333 lb⋅ft) at 4,500 rpm	275 km/h (171 mph)	5.2	370 g/km
Quattroporte Automatica	2007–2008	2007–2008	6,050	4244 cc V8	400 PS (294 kW; 395 hp) at 7,000 rpm	460 N⋅m (339 lb⋅ft) at 4,250 rpm	270 km/h (168 mph)	5.6	345 g/km
Quattroporte Sport GT S	2007–2008	2007–2008	667	4244 cc V8	400 PS (294 kW; 395 hp) at 7,000 rpm	460 N⋅m (339 lb⋅ft) at 4,250 rpm	270 km/h (168 mph)	5.6	345 g/km
Quattroporte	2008–2012	2009–2012	2,021	4244 cc V8	400 PS (294 kW; 395 hp) at 7,000 rpm	460 N⋅m (339 lb⋅ft) at 4,250 rpm	270 km/h (168 mph)	5.6	345 g/km
Quattroporte S	2008–2012	2009–2012	4,032	4691 cc V8	430 PS (316 kW; 424 hp) at 7,000 rpm	490 N⋅m (361 lb⋅ft) at 4,750 rpm	280 km/h (174 mph)	5.4	365 g/km
Quattroporte S	2012	2013	4,032	4691 cc V8	440 PS (324 kW; 434 hp) at 7,000 rpm	490 N⋅m (361 lb⋅ft) at 4,750 rpm	285 km/h (177 mph)	5.3	365 g/km
Quattroporte Sport GT S	2008–2012	2009–2012	1,847*	4691 cc V8	440 PS (324 kW; 434 hp) at 7,000 rpm	490 N⋅m (361 lb⋅ft) at 4,750 rpm	285 km/h (177 mph)	5.1	365 g/km
Quattroporte Sport GT S	2012	2013	1,847*	4691 cc V8	450 PS (331 kW; 444 hp) at 7,000 rpm	510 N⋅m (376 lb⋅ft) at 4,750 rpm	287 km/h (178 mph)	5.0	365 g/km
Total	2003–2012		25,256	* Including 126 Quattroporte Sport GT S Awards Edition					

=== Coachbuilders ===
==== Bellagio Fastback Touring ====
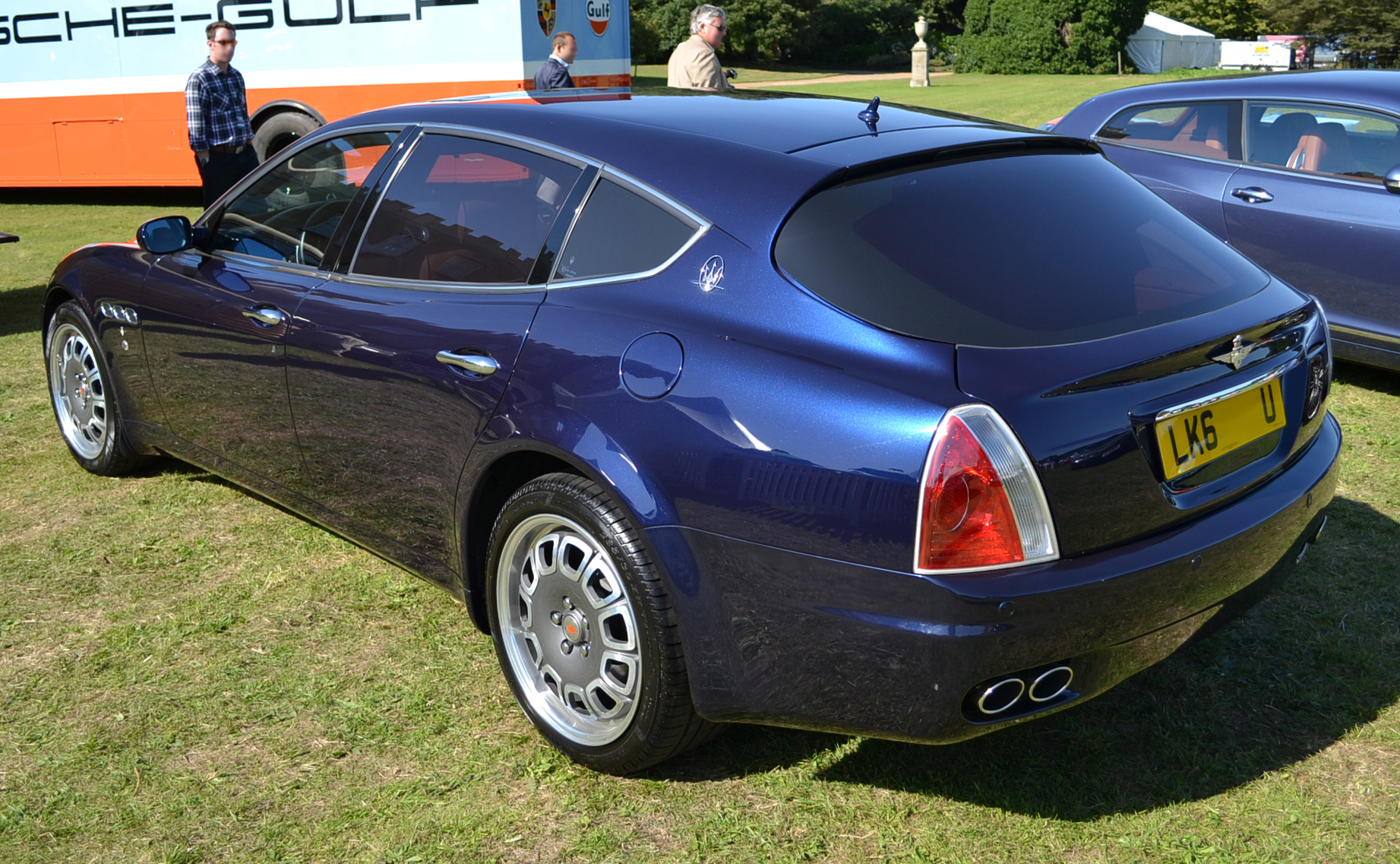
A Bellagio Fastback at Salon Privé 2012

In 2008, at the Concorso d'Eleganza Villa d'Este, Milanese coachbuilder Carrozzeria Touring Superleggera unveiled the Maserati Bellagio Fastback Touring, a 5-door hatchback built on the chassis of the fifth generation of the Quattroporte. In May 2013, a Bellagio Fastback was auctioned by RM Auctions at their Villa Erba event, in occasion of Concorso d'Eleganza Villa d'Este; the price was €117,600. According to the auction house, four examples have been built by Carrozzeria Touring.

A Maserati Quattroporte V has also been used as a hearse, as seen at the funeral of the Polish president Lech Kaczynski in 2010.

=== Motorsport ===
In 2009, Swiss Team announced the development of "Maserati Quattroporte EVO" International Superstars Series racing cars based on the 4.2-litre Quattroporte M139, to be piloted by Andrea Chiesa. Swiss Team fielded the cars in the 2009, 2010, 2011 and 2012 seasons; Italian racing driver Andrea Bertolini won the 2011 championship season at the wheel of a Swiss Team Quattroporte.

== Quattroporte VI (M156, 2013–2023) ==
Sixth generation
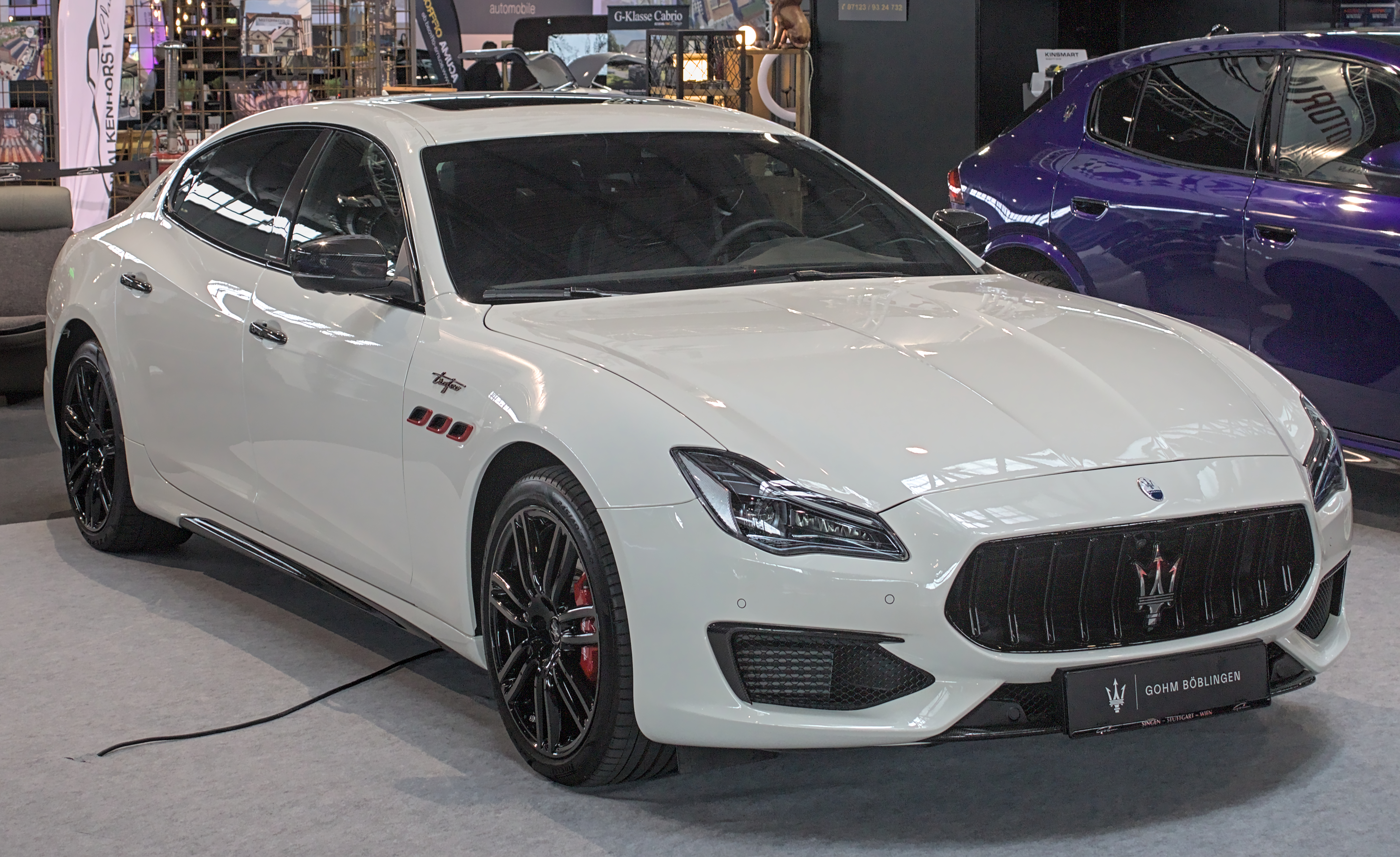
- Maserati Quattroporte Trofeo

Overview
- Production: November 2012 – December 2023
- Model years: 2013–2024
- Designer: Centro Stile Maserati under Lorenzo Ramaciotti

Body and chassis
- Layout: Front-engine, rear-wheel-drive / four-wheel-drive
- Platform: Chrysler LX Platform
- Related: Maserati Ghibli (M157); Maserati Levante

Powertrain
- Engine: Petrol; 3.0 L F160 twin-turbo V6; 3.8 L F154 twin-turbo V8; Diesel; 3.0 L VM A630 HP turbo V6
- Transmission: 8-speed ZF 8HP70 automatic

Dimensions
- Wheelbase: 3,171 mm (124.8 in)
- Length: 5,262 mm (207.2 in)
- Width: 1,948 mm (76.7 in)
- Height: 1,481 mm (58.3 in)
- Kerb weight: 1,860–1,925 kg (4,101–4,244 lb)

The most recent and sixth-generation of the Quattroporte was introduced in early 2013. With a 3,171 mm (124.8 in) wheelbase it is a considerably larger vehicle than any of its predecessors, to set itself apart from the smaller Ghibli, which shares its underpinnings. Engine choice includes twin-turbocharged V6 and V8 petrol engines, as well as a turbodiesel V6. Production ended in late 2023, with 2024 being the last model year and with no successor planned.

=== History ===
==== Development ====
The new Quattroporte was designed at a special Maserati-only department within the Fiat Group Centro Stile design centre, under the guidance of ex-Pininfarina designer Lorenzo Ramaciotti. Drivetrains, platform, suspension, and body elements such as the front doors are common to the Quattroporte and the smaller Ghibli saloon, which sits on a 173 mm (6.8 in) shorter wheelbase. The Quattroporte was manufactured at the Officine Maserati Grugliasco plant in Grugliasco, near Turin, dedicated to Giovanni Agnelli; this former Bertone plant was acquired by Fiat S.p.A. in 2009 and renovated for production of the two cars.

==== Production ====
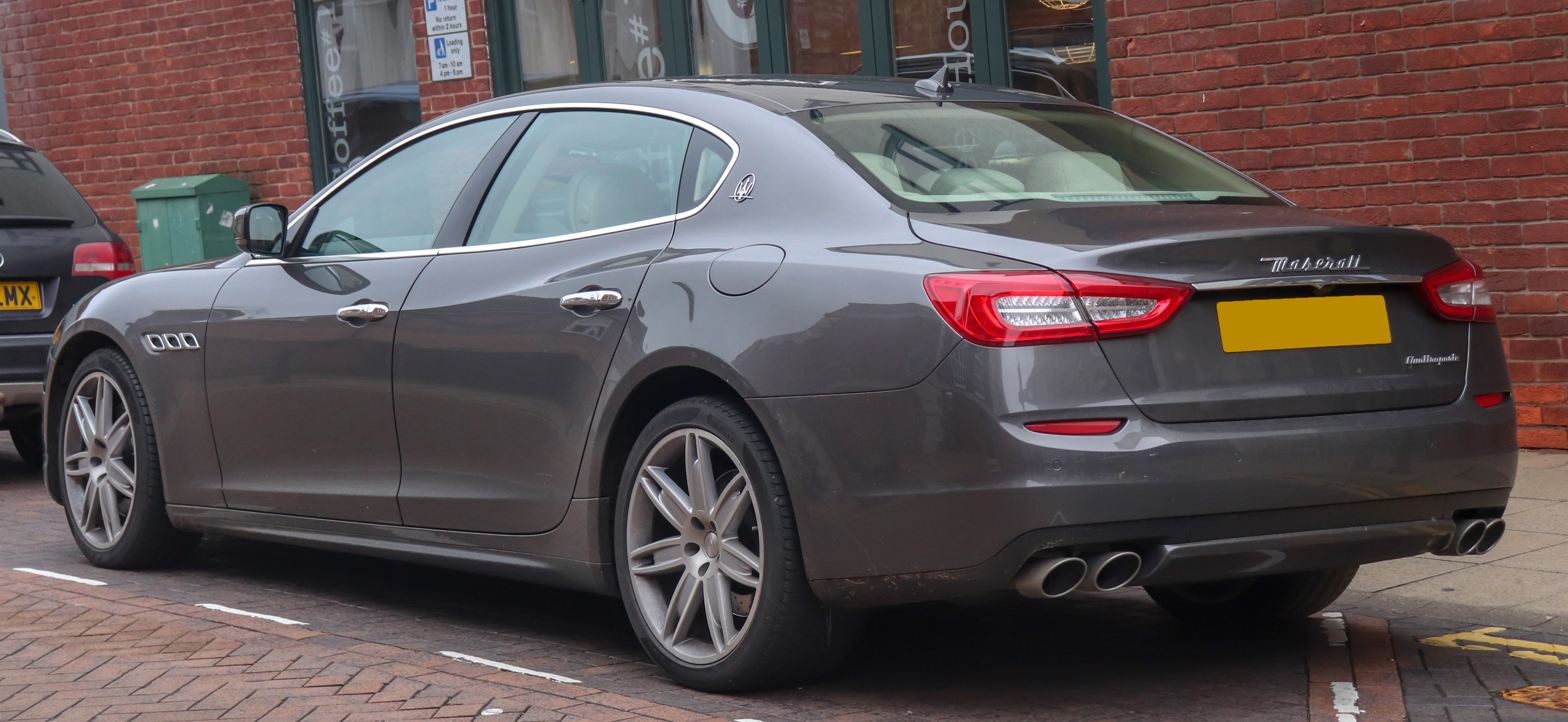
Quattroporte rear view

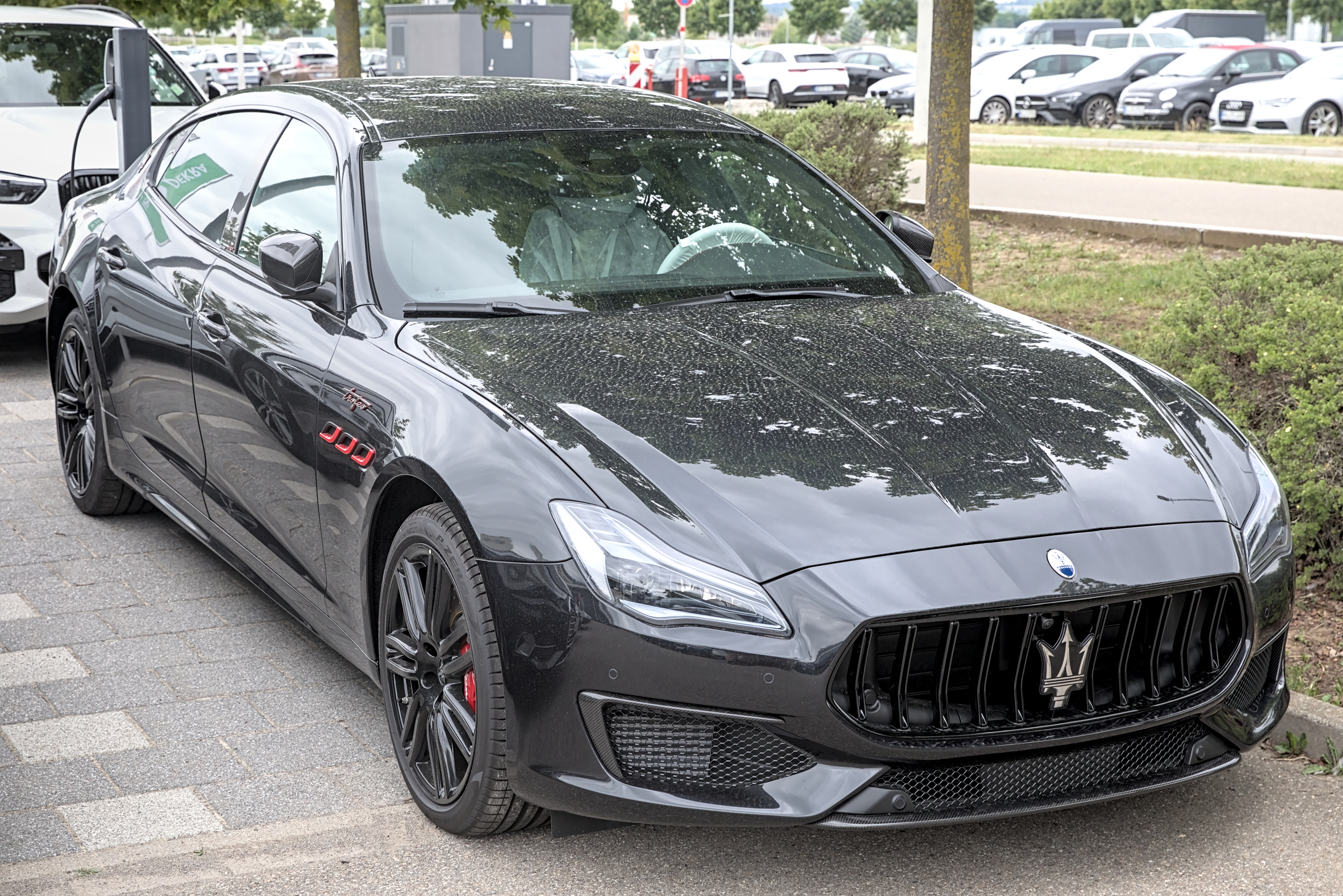
Quattroporte Trofeo

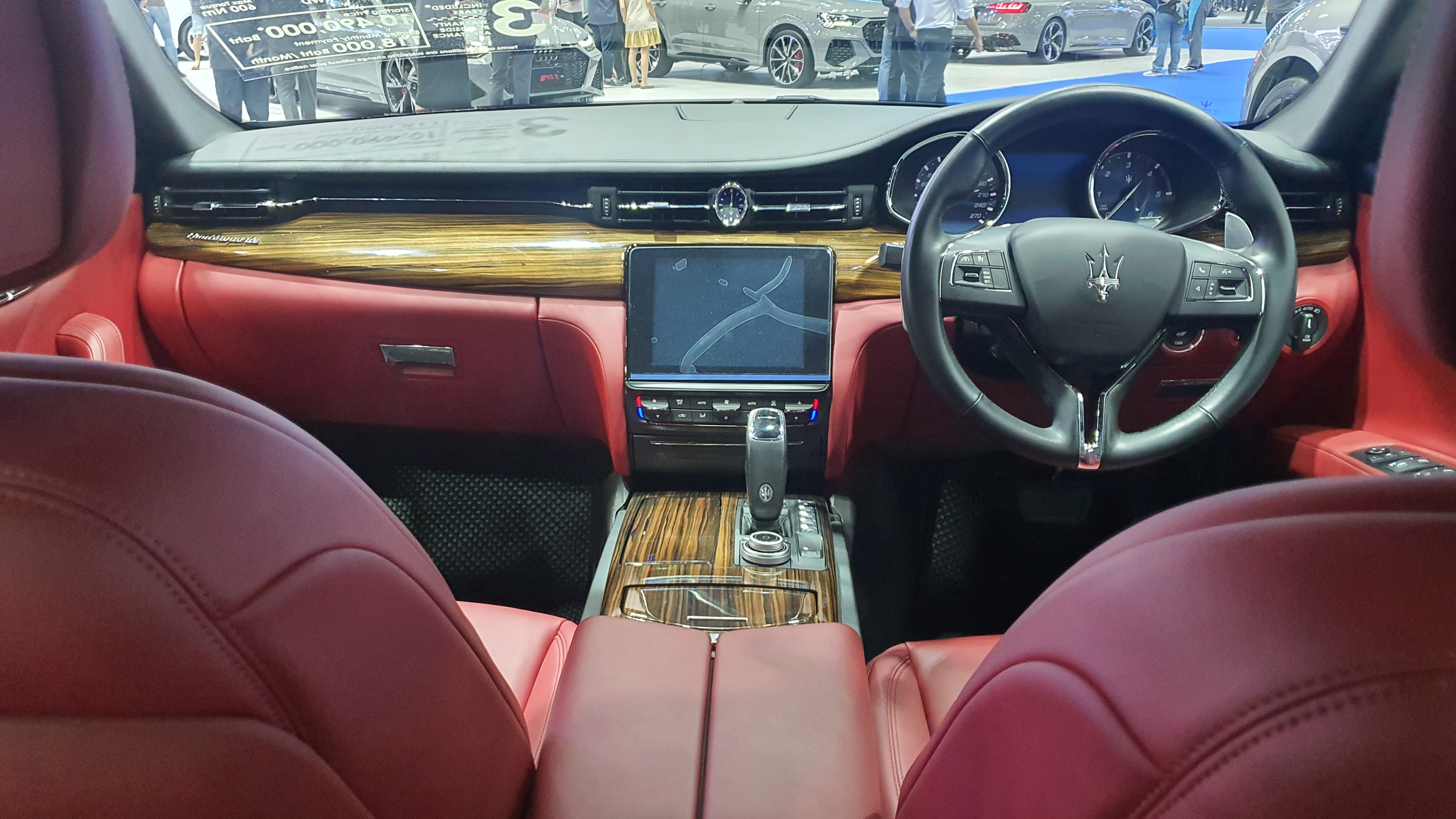
Interior (Quattroporte GranLusso)

This generation of the Quattroporte was unveiled at the North American International Auto Show in Detroit in January 2013. Production started in November 2012. Initially the range included the twin-turbocharged V8 equipped, rear-wheel drive Quattroporte GTS and the entry level Quattroporte equipped with a twin-turbocharged V6 engine; available with Q4 four-wheel drive and rear-wheel drive depending on the market and the choice of the customer. The flagship GTS can be distinguished by its trapezoidal instead of round tail pipes. A V6 turbodiesel model for European markets was introduced in September 2013 at the Frankfurt Motor Show.

Production of both Ghibli and Quattroporte was moved to the Fiat Mirafiori factory in Torino during February 2022. In early September 2023, Maserati announced that production of the V8 engine used on the Ghibli (M157) and Quattroporte was to conclude at the end of 2023. Production of the Quattroporte ceased at the end of 2023.

==== 2015 Quattroporte Zegna Limited Edition ====
A total of 100 Quattroporte Zegna Limited editions were produced for worldwide markets in collaboration with Italian fashion house Ermenegildo Zegna. This unique model based on the Quattroporte GTS features unique exterior and interior details including a custom platinum-metallic silk paint scheme with aluminium pigments the exterior of the car along with matching colour coordinated 20-inch wheels. On the interior, the seats, panels, roof lining and sunshades are made from specially milled silk fibers, high performance leather and woolen herringbone fabrics.

2015

At the November 2014 Los Angeles Auto Show Maserati introduced the 2015 model year range. The Quattroporte GTS received mild cosmetic updates, such as new multi-spoke forged alloy wheels, colour-matched lower bodywork, and red-accented Maserati logos, while all models were given upgraded standard equipment and ampler trim choice.

2017

For (U.S. model year) 2017, the Quattroporte received a tech update with a new, larger infotainment system, adaptive cruise control, 360 degree cameras and lane-departure warning.

2018

For (U.S. model year) 2018, the Quattroporte received new headlights and another tech update which added mild-autonomy features such as lane keeping. The autonomous features required a change from hydraulic power steering to electric power steering.

2019

In 2019, the Maserati Quattroporte GTS was awarded "Best Luxury Vehicle" by the Washington Automotive Press Association (WAPA), in Washington DC. The sixth generation Quattroporte is considered as one of the fastest relatively depreciating production cars.

2021

For (U.S. model year) 2021, the Quattroporte received a new Trofeo ("trophy" in Italian) top performance trim with a slight power increase. It also received a larger infotainment screen.

=== Sales ===
Year	Europe
2013	452
2014	812
2015	815
2016	682
2017	562
2018	459
2019	251
2020	116
2021	115
Total	4,264

=== Specifications ===
==== Body and chassis ====
The Quattroporte uses a mixed steel and aluminium unibody chassis. The front and rear crash structures, the shock towers, the front wings, all four doors, the bonnet and the boot lid are made of aluminium and the car has a drag coefficient of Cd=0.28. The front suspension uses unequal length wishbones with a forged aluminium upright/hub carrier, and an anti-roll bar; the rear suspension consists of a 5-link setup, with four aluminium links and a larger, steel fifth lower arm that also serves as a spring seat. A front aluminium subframe supports the engine by two mounting points; the steering rack and the lower suspension arms. A rear subframe, made of steel, houses the differential and supports all of the five suspension links. Unlike its predecessors, the new Quattroporte has frameless doors.

==== Engines and performance ====
The Quattroporte was offered with range of two petrol engines. The Quattroporte GTS features a variant of the F154 engine platform shared with the Ferrari 488, the Portofino and other Ferrari models. The engine is a 3.8-litre 90° twin-turbocharged V8, generating a maximum power output of 530 PS (390 kW; 523 hp). The base engine used throughout the trim levels is a 3.0-litre 60° twin-turbocharged V6 generating a maximum power output of 410 PS (302 kW; 404 hp). The same engine is shared with the mid-size Ghibli. Both engines are designed and assembled by Ferrari.

The V8 engine used by Maserati differs from the other members of the Ferrari F154 family, in that the Maserati version has a crossplane crankshaft and wet sump lubrication and the turbine housings and exhaust manifolds are integrated in a single piece. The engine also has an overboost function which raises the maximum torque from 650 N⋅m (479 lbf⋅ft) between 2,000 and 4,000 rpm to 710 N⋅m (524 lbf⋅ft) between 2,250 and 3,500 rpm.

The V6 engine blocks were cast and machined to Ferrari's specifications respectively in Chrysler's Kokomo, Indiana and Trenton Engine Plant from where they were then shipped to the Ferrari factory in Modena, Italy for assembly. Apart from the gasoline engines, a diesel engine is also available in the Quattroporte lineage, a 275 PS (202 kW; 271 hp) 3.0-litre V6 with a single variable geometry turbocharger, designed and assembled by FCA's subsidiary VM Motori.

As of the 2018 model year, the Quattroporte S Q4 was upgraded to raise the maximum power to 430 PS (316 kW; 424 hp) from its twin-turbocharged V6 engine. The GTS also received a power upgrade and now generates a maximum power output of 568 PS (418 kW; 560 hp) from its twin-turbocharged V8 engine.

The Quattroporte GTS can accelerate from 0–97 km/h (0–60 mph) in 4.2 seconds and can complete the quarter-mile in 12.7 seconds as evident in Car and Driver's December 2014 road test.

Model	Engine	Peak power	Peak torque	Layout	Top speed	0–100 km/h 0–62 mph (seconds)	CO_{2} emissions
Petrol engines
Quattroporte	2,979 cc twin-turbocharged F160 V6	330 PS (243 kW; 325 hp) at 5,500 rpm	500 N⋅m (369 lb⋅ft) between 1,750–4,500 rpm	RWD	264 km/h (164 mph)	5.7	212 g/km
Quattroporte (2018)	2,979 cc twin-turbocharged F160 V6	350 PS (257 kW; 345 hp) at 5,500 rpm	500 N⋅m (369 lb⋅ft) between 1,750–4,500 rpm	RWD	270 km/h (168 mph)	5.5	259–260 g/km
Quattroporte S	2,979 cc twin-turbocharged F160 V6	410 PS (302 kW; 404 hp) at 5,500 rpm	550 N⋅m (406 lb⋅ft) between 1,750–5,000 rpm	RWD	285 km/h (177 mph)	5.1	244 g/km
Quattroporte S (2018)	2,979 cc twin-turbocharged F160 V6	430 PS (316 kW; 424 hp) at 5,750 rpm	575 N⋅m (424 lb⋅ft) between 2,250–4,000 rpm	RWD	288 km/h (179 mph)	5.0	223 g/km
Quattroporte S Q4	2,979 cc twin-turbocharged F160 V6	410 PS (302 kW; 404 bhp) at 5,500 rpm	550 N⋅m (406 lb⋅ft) between 1,750–5,000 rpm	AWD	283 km/h (176 mph)	4.9	246 g/km
Quattroporte S Q4 (2018)	2,979 cc twin-turbocharged F160 V6	430 PS (316 kW; 424 hp) at 5,750 rpm	575 N⋅m (424 lb⋅ft) between 2,250–4,000 rpm	AWD	288 km/h (179 mph)	4.8	275–278 g/km
Quattroporte GTS	3,798 cc twin-turbocharged F154 V8	530 PS (390 kW; 523 hp) between 6,500–6,800 rpm	650 N⋅m (479 lb⋅ft) between 2,000–4,000 rpm overboost: 710 N⋅m (524 lb⋅ft)	RWD	307 km/h (191 mph)	4.7	274 g/km
Quattroporte Trofeo	3,798 cc twin-turbocharged F154 V8	580 PS (427 kW; 572 hp) between 6,500–6,800 rpm	729 N⋅m (538 lb⋅ft) between 2,000–4,000 rpm	RWD	326 km/h (203 mph)	4.5	274 g/km
Diesel engines
Quattroporte Diesel	2,987 cc turbocharged A630 HP V6	275 PS (202 kW; 271 bhp) at 4,000 rpm	600 N⋅m (443 lb⋅ft) between 2,000–4,000 rpm	RWD	250 km/h (155 mph)	6.4	163 g/km

==== Transmission ====
All engines are mated to a ZF-supplied 8HP70 8-speed automatic gearbox, with four-wheel drive available on the V6 in left-hand drive markets only.

The V6 four-wheel drive Q4 drivetrain is the same as that in the Ghibli. Attached to the end of the 8-speed transmission is a transfer case, containing an electronically controlled multi-plate wet clutch, which sends power through a drive shaft to an open differential bolted to the oil pan. During normal operation the car is rear-wheel drive only; when needed the system can divert up of 50% of engine torque to the front wheels.

== See also ==
- Riverside International Automotive Museum
- Maserati M139 platform
