= Carrozzeria Pavesi =

- Industry: Automotive
- Founded: 1929
- Defunct: 2012
- Headquarters: Milan, Italy

Carrozzeria Ernesto Pavesi (short: Pavesi) was a coachbuilding company from Milan, Italy, that produced armored vehicles and also carried out further body conversions on customer request. Since the 1960s, Pavesi has produced a series of special bodies for the Maserati and De Tomaso brands belonging to Alejandro de Tomaso's group of companies.

== History ==
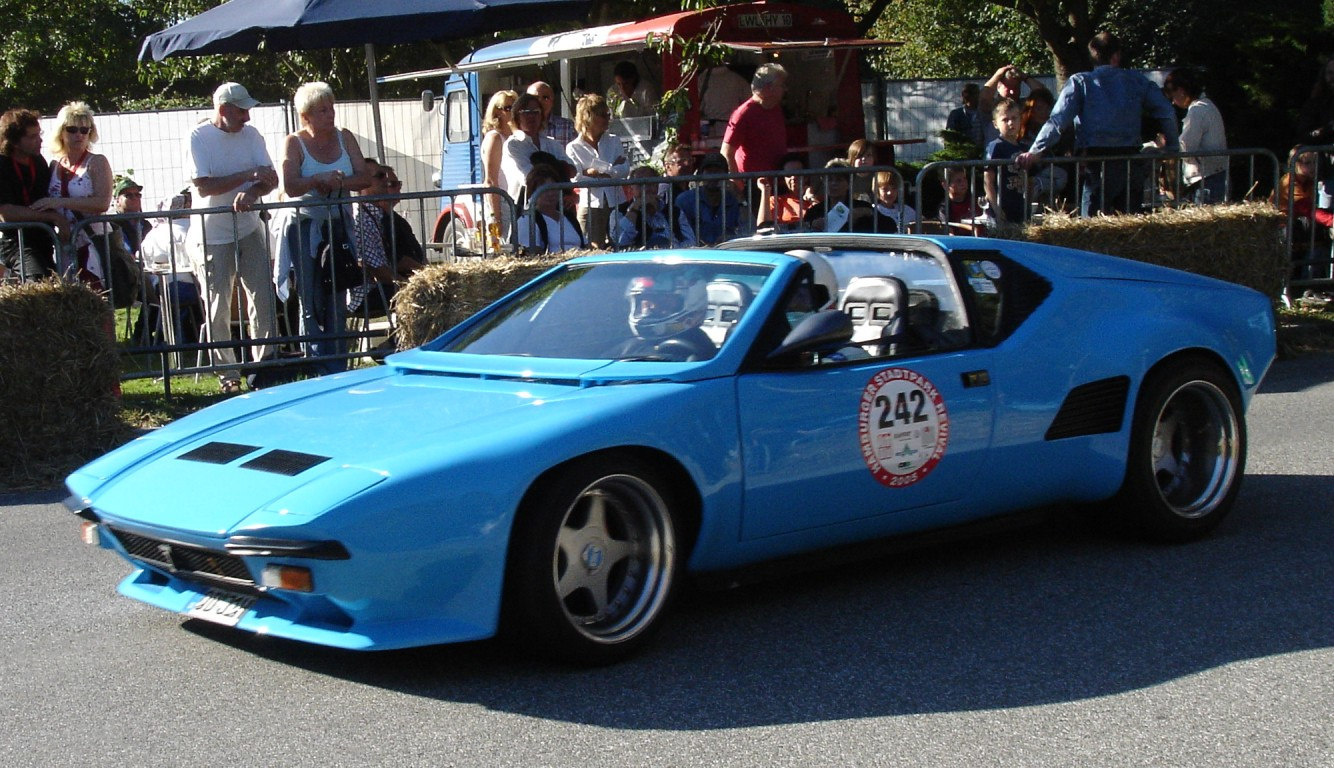
DeTomaso Pantera fitted with a targa roof by Pavesi

The company was founded in Milan in 1929. Pavesi initially manufactured bodies for commercial vehicles and hearses. After Ernesto Pavesi's son Gianpaolo joined the company management, the business expanded its activities to include the manufacture of luxury bodies for passenger cars. Before the Second World War, Pavesi bodied chassis for Alfa Romeo, Isotta Fraschini and Lancia; it also produced some bodies for Bugatti chassis.

After the war, Pavesi refined Rolls-Royce and Ferrari vehicles for customers. In the 1960s, Pavesi developed conversions for production vehicles, which in turn were produced in small series. These include station wagon versions of the Alfa Romeo 1750. During this time, Pavesi became a specialist in targa roofs. Pavesi produced Targa versions of the Iso Grifo, the Fiat Dino and the De Tomaso Pantera.

Another field of activity was the manufacture of armored cars for the Italian police and other government agencies – some Italian presidents drove vehicles that Pavesi had armoured – but also wealthy private customers. Pavesi worked for De Tomaso on a factory contract basis in the 1970s and 1980s. At the start of the 21st century, bodywork construction declined significantly. The company was recently involved in the restoration of vintage cars. It ceased operations in 2012.

== Conversions by Pavesi ==
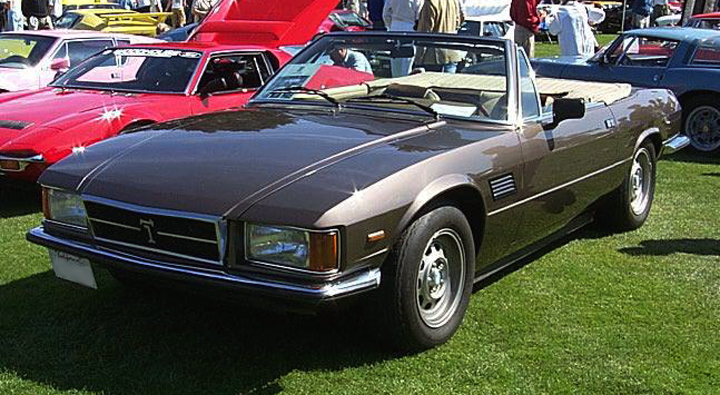
- DeTomaso Longchamp converted to a spyder by Pavesi
  In the late 1960s, Pavesi produced a Targa version of the Maserati Ghibli. The vehicle remained a one-off.
- From 1981, Pavesi produced the Spyder version of the De Tomaso Longchamp on behalf of de Tomaso. Pavesi received the complete coupé bodies from Embo, removed the roof and installed a fabric top. 14 factory convertibles were created this way; in addition, Pavesi also converted a number of older Longchamp coupés into convertibles at the customer's request. In addition to the Longchamp Spyders, there are also one or two convertibles based on the Maserati Kyalami, which is essentially identical to the Longchamp. There is much to suggest that Pavesi also carried out these conversions.
- Pavesi also converted four De Tomaso Panteras of the second series into Targa coupes on behalf of the factory. In addition, numerous older Panteras were converted accordingly at the customer's request.
- Three or four Maserati Quattroporte IIIs were converted into two-door sedans by Pavesi.
- Pavesi also armored a large number of De Tomaso Deauville and Maserati Quattroporte limousines. Some of these vehicles were used by Italian politicians. Sandro Pertini, for example, preferred an armored Deauville.

== Literature ==
- Alessandro Sannia: Enciclopedia dei carrozzieri italiani, Società Editrice Il Cammello, Torino, 2017, ISBN 978-88-96796-41-2
