= De Tomaso Longchamp =

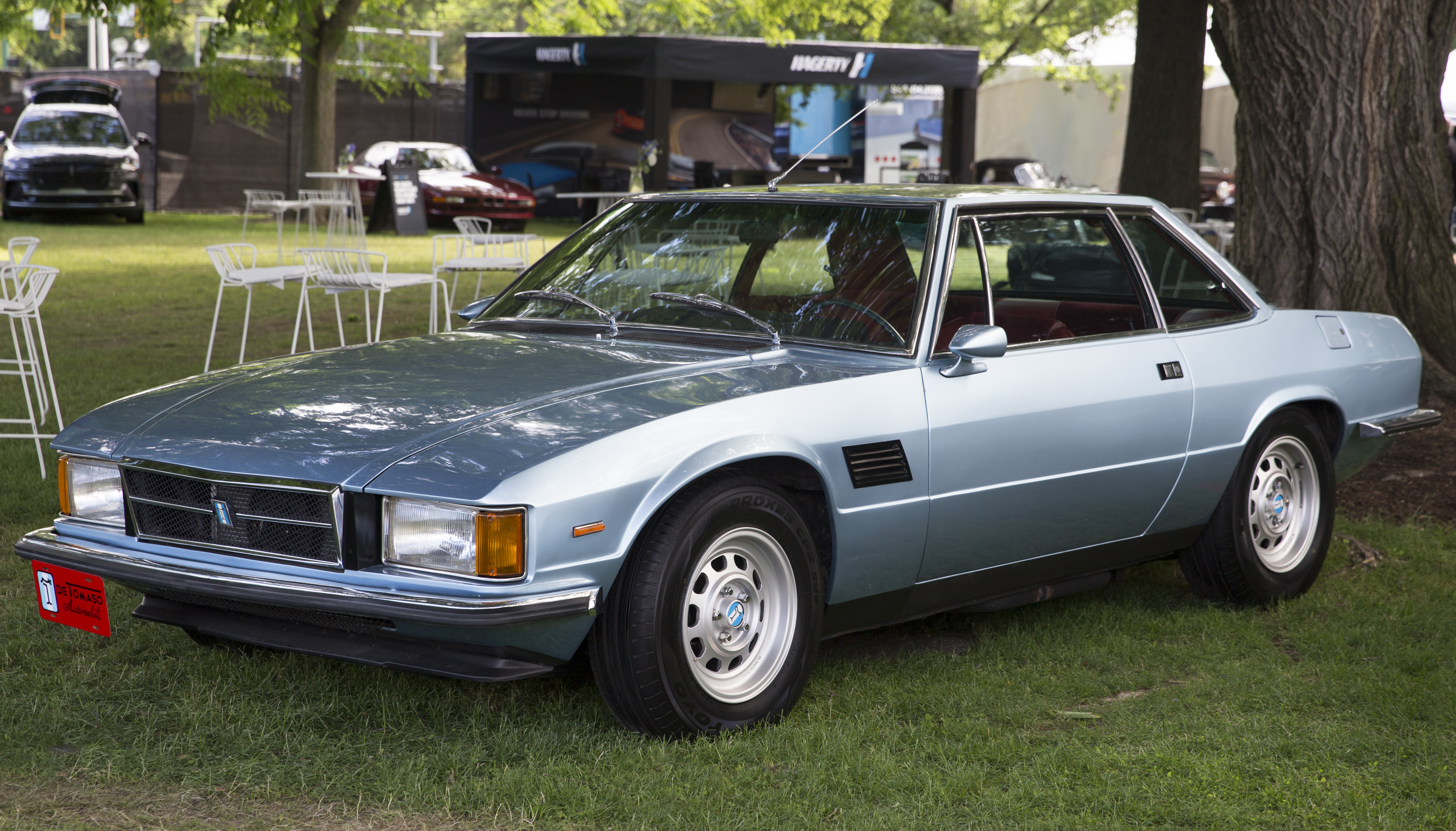
- 1975 De Tomaso Longchamp

Overview
- Manufacturer: De Tomaso
- Production: 1972–1989; 409 produced
- Assembly: Italy: Modena
- Designer: Tom Tjaarda at Ghia

Body and chassis
- Class: Grand tourer (S)
- Body style: 2-door coupé 2-door convertible
- Layout: Front-engine, rear-wheel-drive
- Related: Maserati Kyalami; Maserati Quattroporte III/Royale; De Tomaso Deauville

Powertrain
- Engine: 5.8 L Ford Cleveland V8
- Transmission: 3-speed Ford C-6 automatic 5-speed ZF manual

Dimensions
- Wheelbase: 2,600 mm (102.4 in)
- Length: 4,600 mm (181.1 in)
- Width: 1,830 mm (72.0 in)
- Height: 1,295 mm (51.0 in)
- Curb weight: 1,815 kg (4,001 lb) (GTS)

The De Tomaso Longchamp is a grand tourer which was produced by the Italian automaker De Tomaso from 1972 to 1989.

== History ==
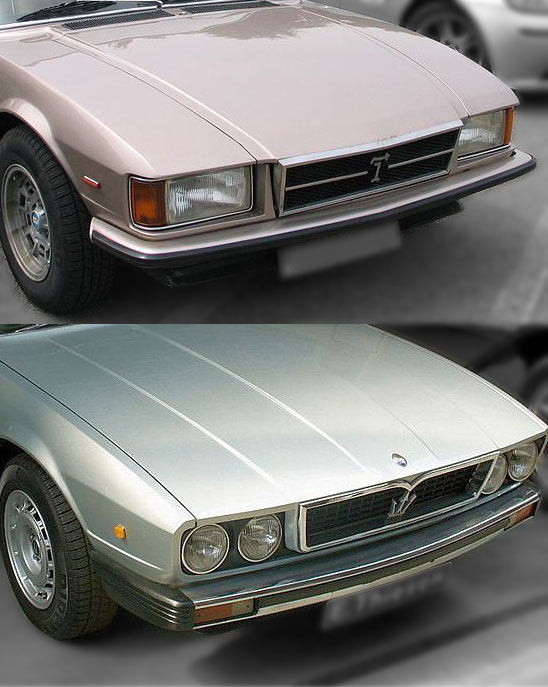
Comparison between the front end of the De Tomaso Longchamp (top) and Maserati Kyalami (bottom).

The Longchamp was derived from the De Tomaso Deauville four-door saloon, using a shorter wheelbase chassis with the same suspension, engine and transmission. The same platform underpinned the Maserati Kyalami grand tourer and the Maserati Quattroporte III saloon as Maserati was owned by De Tomaso at the time. The Deauville and the Longchamp were the only front engine production cars produced by De Tomaso. The Longchamp was first exhibited at the 1972 Turin Motor Show and was initially offered only as a 2-door 2+2 coupé. It was designed by Tom Tjaarda of Ghia and was influenced by his previous Lancia Marica prototype. The taillights were the same units as were used for the Alfa Romeo 1750/2000 saloon. The headlights and front indicators are from the Ford Consul/Granada. The name Longchamp is likely a reference to the Longchamp Racecourse in Paris and/or Longchamps, Buenos Aires, a city near de Tomaso company founder Alejandro de Tomaso's birthplace.

The Longchamp featured a long and wide hood to accommodate the American power train, i.e. the 351 cubic inch (5,769 cc) Ford Cleveland V8. The 351 Cleveland, a popular and very potent engine in early 1970s Ford muscle cars, was the same unit used in the Pantera. It was rated at a power output of 335 PS (246 kW; 330 hp) and gave the Longchamp an official top speed of 240 km/h (149 mph). After Ford stopped manufacturing the 351 Cleveland V8 in the US, De Tomaso sourced the engines from Ford Australia. The standard gearbox was a three-speed Ford C-6 Cruise-o-Matic automatic transmission; however around 17 cars were equipped with a five-speed ZF manual transmission. The suspension was independent front and rear wishbone unit equipped with coil springs. Steering was power assisted rack and pinion and the car came with vented disc brakes all around with the rear brake discs being positioned inboard. The interior of the car was quite luxurious and it was almost fully upholstered in leather, although the use of Ford sourced parts (steering wheel, gear shift) somewhat diminished the luxurious impression.

== Development ==
Production of the Series 1 began in 1973. For the 1980 model year, the modernised Series 2 was introduced, with slight modifications occurring later as well.

A sporty GTS variant was introduced at the 1980 Turin Motor Show, featuring wider wheels and flared wheel arches. and minor suspension setting differences to better utilise the wider Campagnolo wheels with Pirelli P7 tyres. A Longchamp cabriolet variant ("Spyder") was also introduced alongside the GTS. It was made by Carrozzeria Pavesi of Milan, and a small number of cars were built to GTS specifications. Pavesi also converted a number of older coupés to Spyders.

After supplies of American-built 351 V8s dried up, De Tomaso began sourcing their engines from Australia, to where the production line had been transferred. The engines were tuned in Switzerland before being installed, and were available with power outputs of 270, 300, or 330 PS (199, 221, or 243 kW). In the eighties another version also appeared, the GTS/E. This was the top-of-the-line version, fitted with twin round headlights and extra spoilers, skirts, and a rear wing.

A total of 409 cars were built (395 coupés and 14 spyders) between 1972 and 1989, with only a couple of cars per year built during the last years. The vast majority are of Series 1 specifications. Some claim that production actually came to an end in 1986, with later cars being sold from stock. From 1979 on, bodyshells for the Longchamp and the Kyalami were built by Embo S.p.A. The Longchamp was never officially sold in the United States, although a number of cars found their way into the US as gray-market imports. The Maserati Kyalami and Maserati Quattroporte III were both developed using the Longchamp chassis and conceived just as Alejandro de Tomaso took over Maserati. The Kyalami was also superficially very similar to the Longchamp, although no body panels were actually shared. The Maserati derivatives used a Maserati V8, however, rather than the Ford unit favoured by De Tomaso.

== Gallery ==
Rear view of series 1 car (1975)

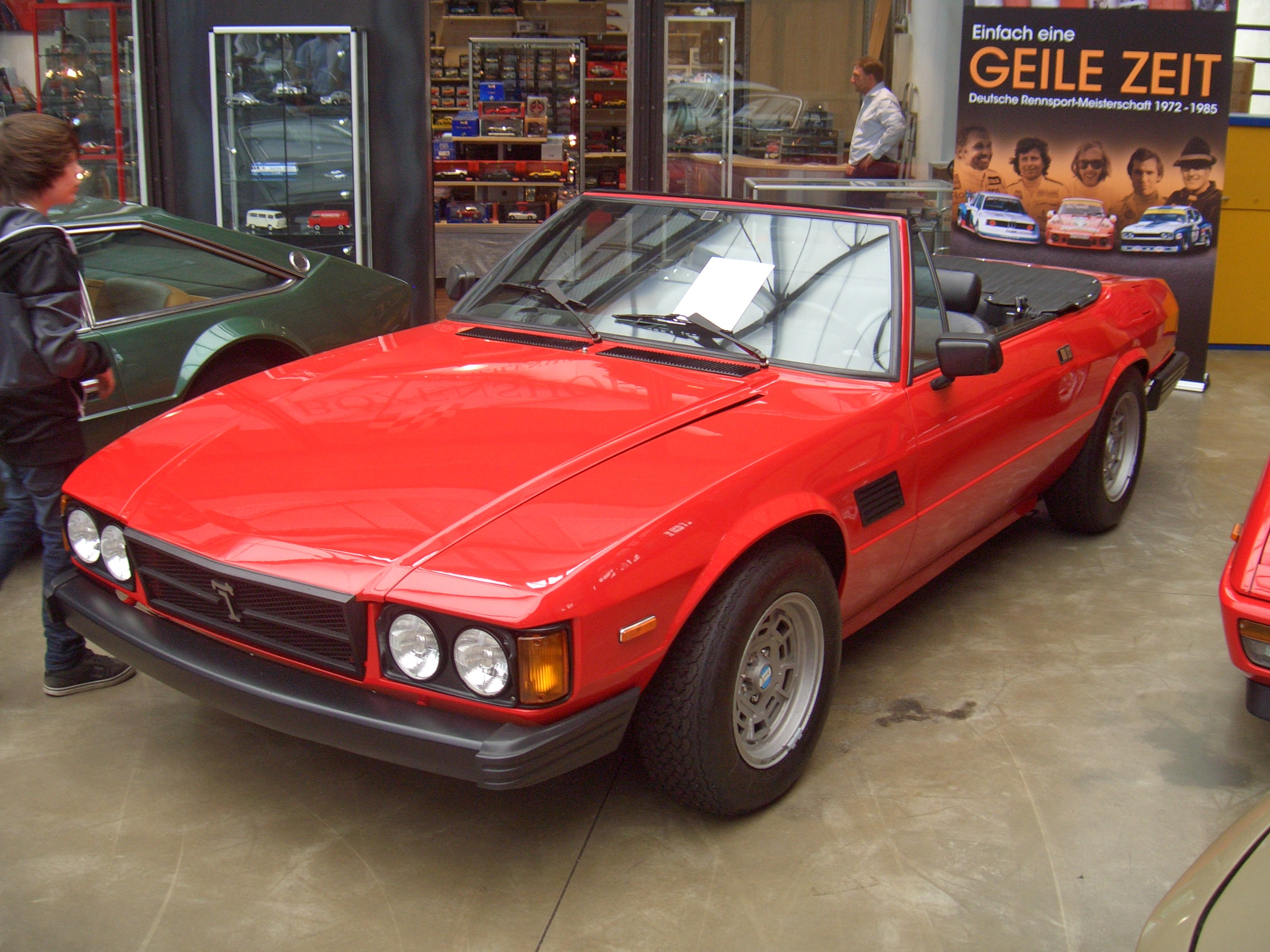
Longchamp Spyder (1983)

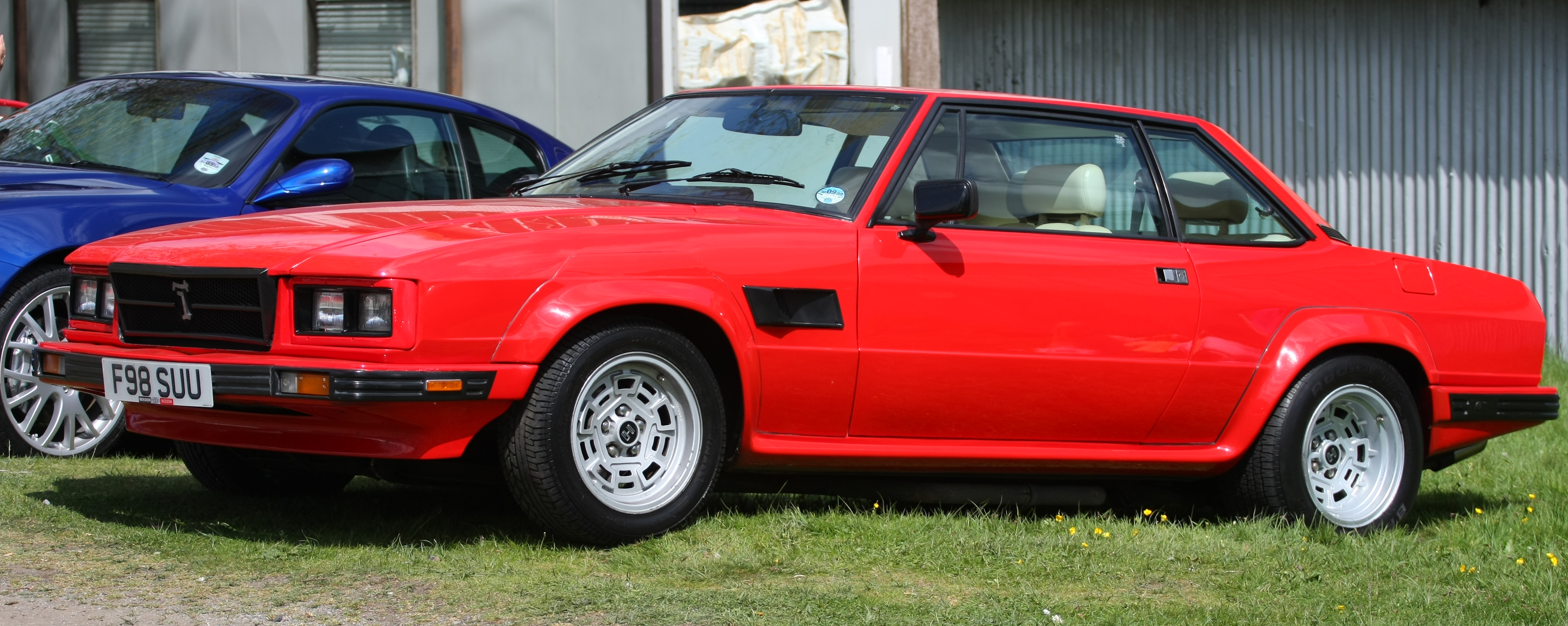
1988 GTS coupé

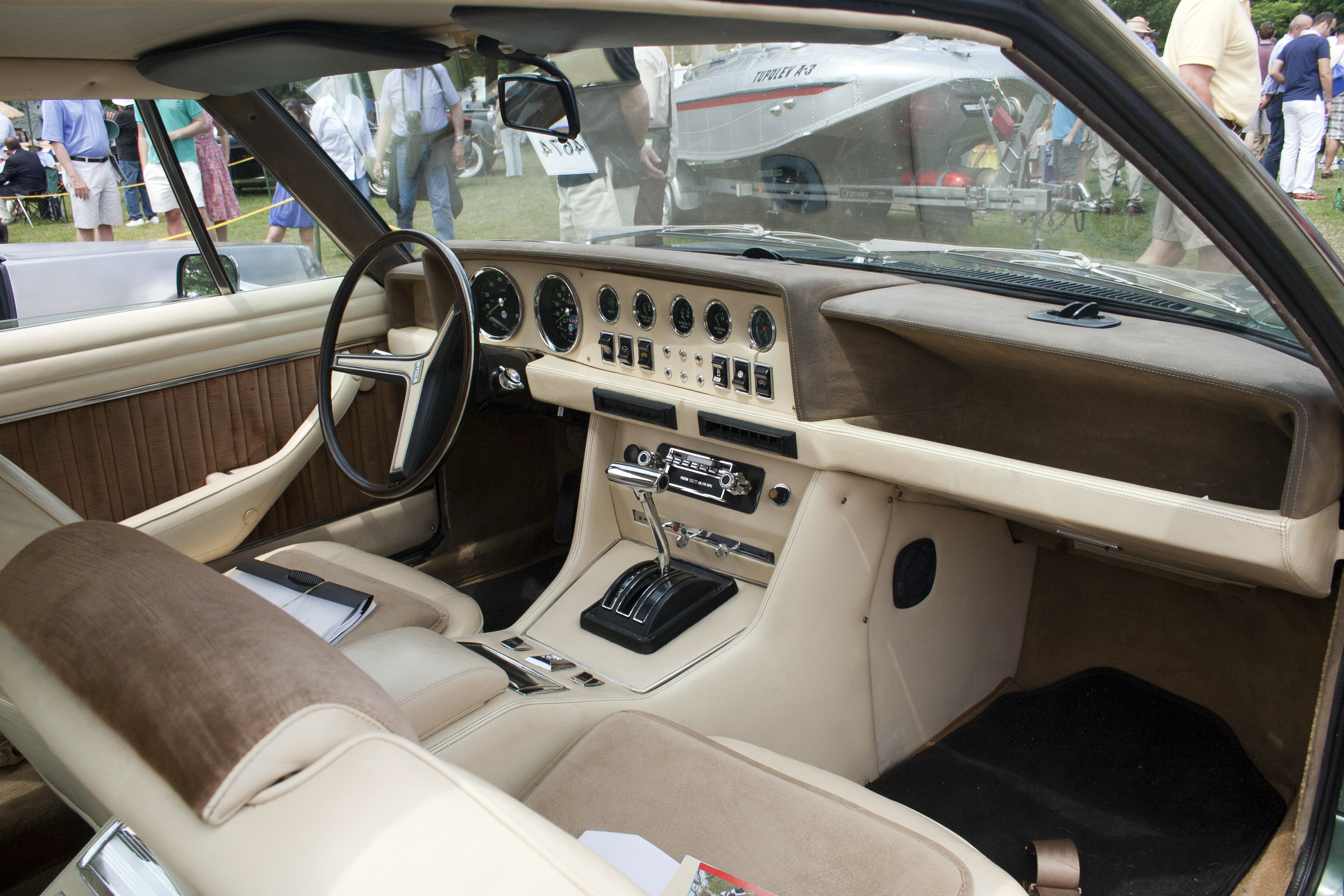
Interior of 1974 Longchamp, with Ford steering wheel and gearshift hardware clearly visible
