= Embo =

Embo or EMBO may refer to:

- Embo (Nguni ancestry), ancient Southern African ethnic identity and grouping
- Embo, Taguig, a grouping of barangays in Taguig, Philippines
- Embo (Star Wars), a Star Wars fictional character
- Embo S.p.A., an Italian automotive manufacturer
- Embo, Sutherland, a village in Highland, Scotland
- European Molecular Biology Organization
