= Pavesi =

Pavesi is an Italian surname.

== Notable people ==
- Attilio Pavesi (1910–2011), Italian cyclist
- Carlo Pavesi (1923–1995), Italian fencer
- Donato Pavesi (1889–1946), Italian racewalker
- Eberardo Pavesi (1883–1974), Italian cyclist
- Stefano Pavesi (1779–1850), Italian composer

== Companies ==
- Carrozzeria Pavesi, a bodywork company founded in Milan by Ernesto Pavesi in 1929.
