= Embo S.p.A. =

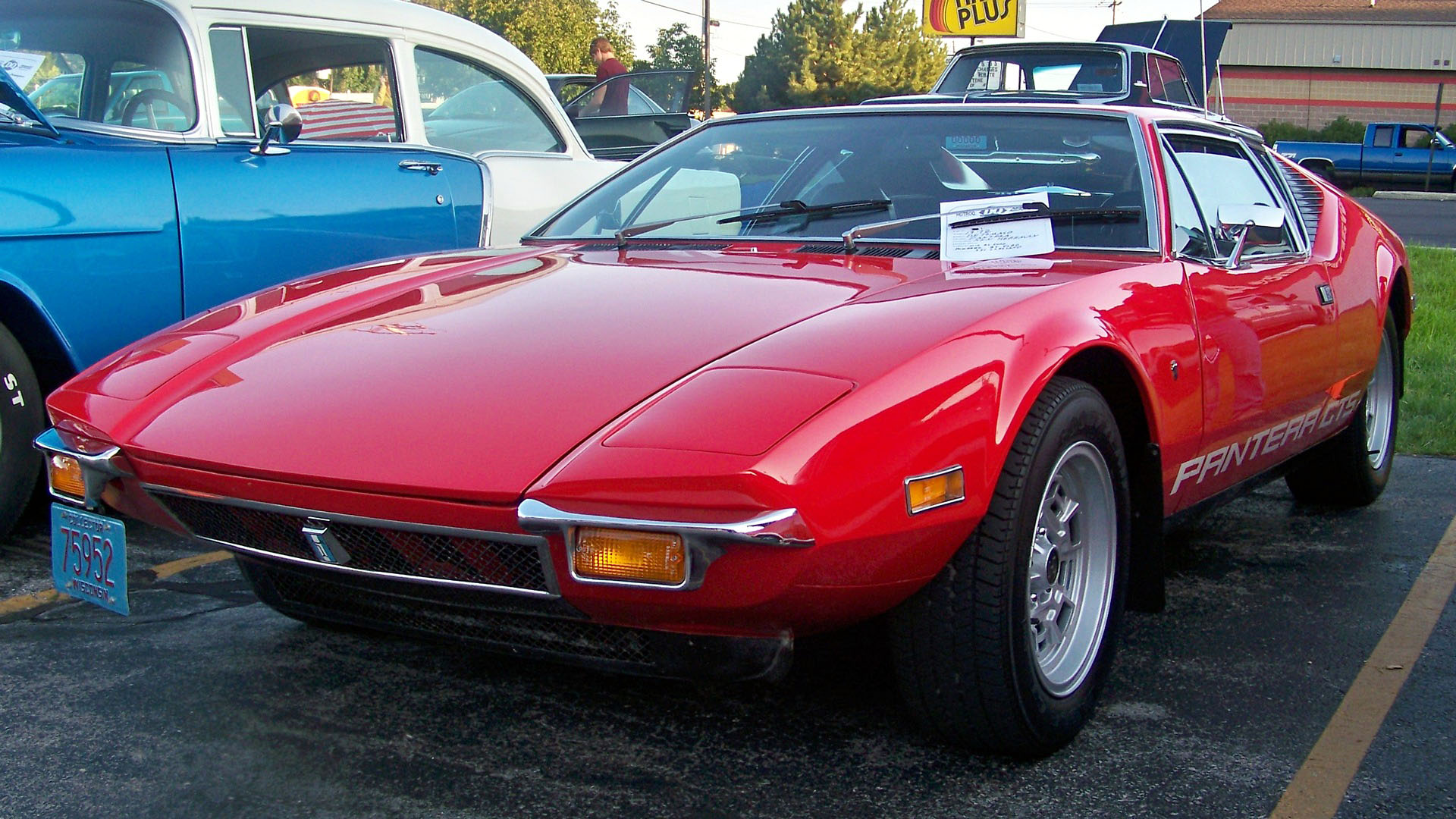
Embo produced over 500 DeTomaso Pantera bodies

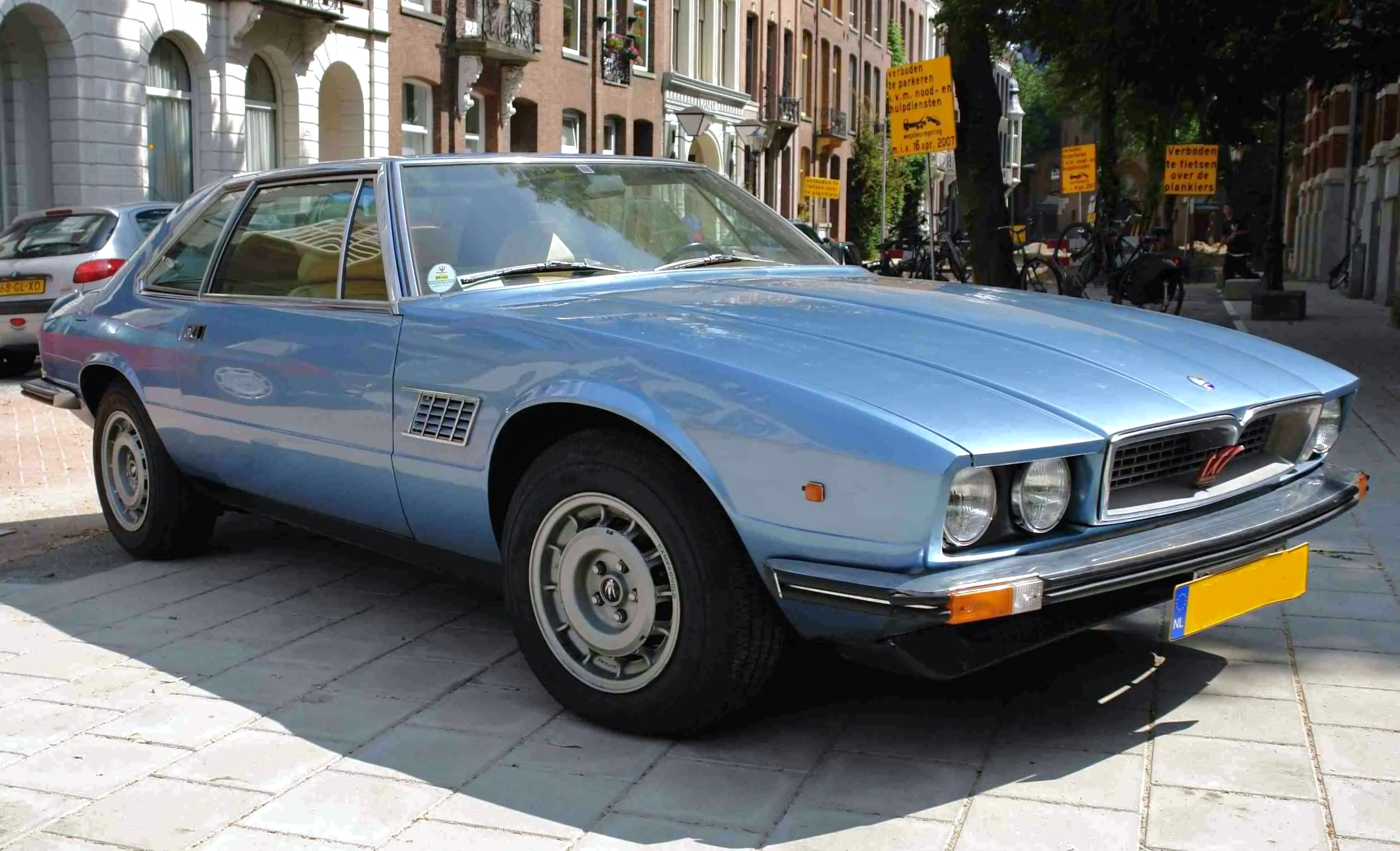
Embo produced bodies for the Maserati Kyalami

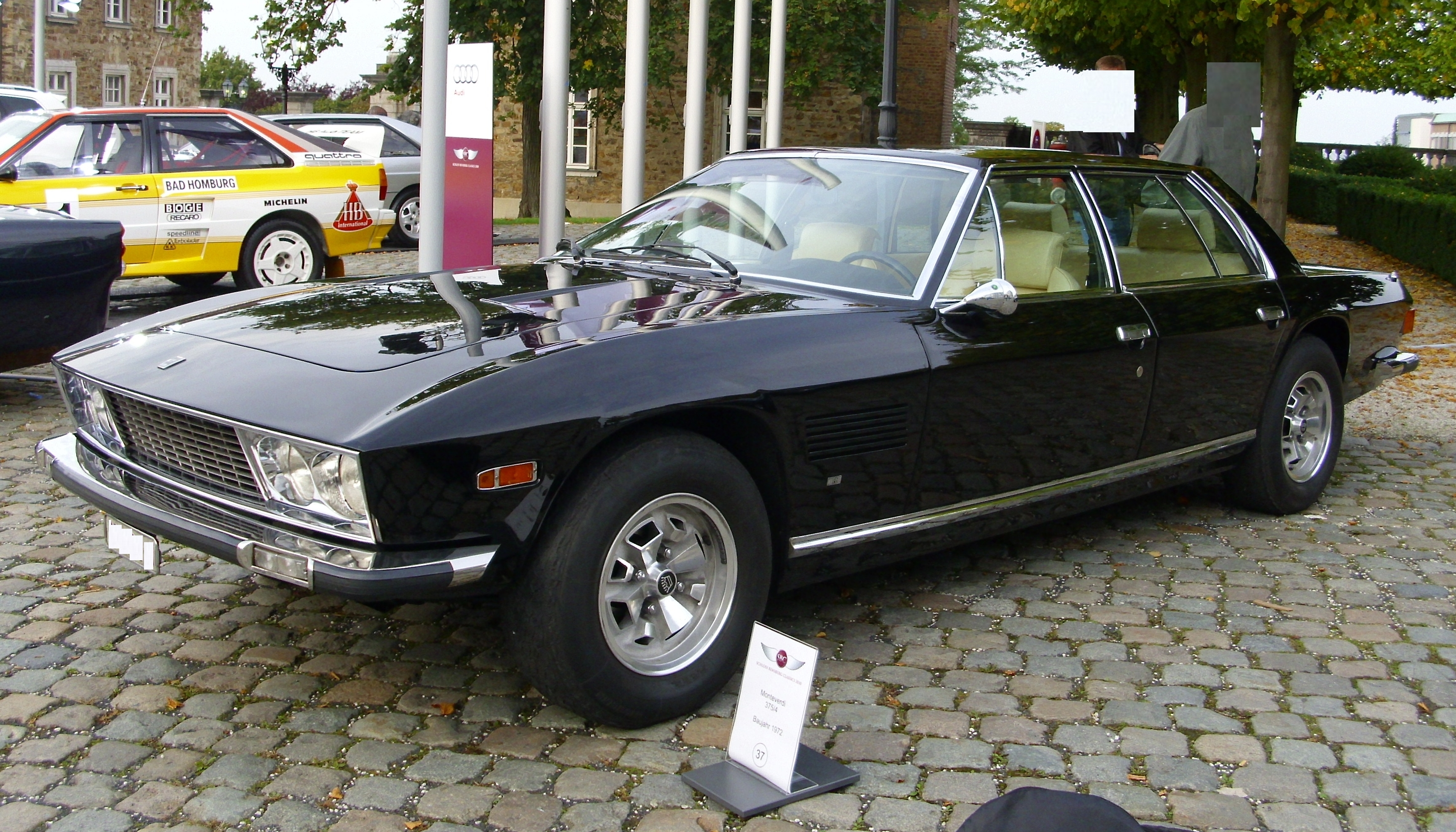
Embo built a handful of bodies for Monteverdi, including for the 375/4

Embo S.p.A. in Caramagna Piemonte is a body parts supplier to the European automotive industry which briefly also manufactured vehicles under its own brand name.

== History ==
The company was founded in 1970 as a coachbuilder. One founder, Graziano Boni, died in 2022. Until the 1980s, Embo produced bodies for small European car manufacturers. In some cases, these were just body shells, and in other cases, the vehicles were (almost) completely assembled.

Embo worked for De Tomaso and Maserati for a long time, including on the De Tomaso Pantera. Between 1979 and 1990, a total of 463 Panteras of the first series were built, and from 1990 to 1993 another 41 examples of the second series were produced, as well as the De Tomaso Longchamp and the largely identical Maserati Kyalami. They also built the De Tomaso Deauville, including an estate version called Giardinetta created in 1985 from some of the last Deauville parts as a one-off for Elisabeth Heskell, the wife of Alejandro de Tomaso, .

In 1982, Embo displayed a convertible version of the Maserati Biturbo, which had been launched shortly before. The convertible was based on the standard length Biturbo chassis and had a comparatively large hood. This version was not mass-produced. Instead, Maserati owner Alejandro de Tomaso opted for a Spyder version from Zagato in Milan, which was based on a shortened chassis. Zagato was to produce all of the Biturbo Spyders until 1996.

In addition, Embo produced a number of other prototypes, such as a convertible version of the Innocenti Mini and a revised Renault 5. Embo also showed a long-wheelbase version of the Innocenti Mini, built on the Mini Traveller's bottom plate, which inspired the manufacturer to build a stretched version later on.

Embo also collaborated with the Swiss car manufacturer Monteverdi. In the 1970s, Monteverdi had the vast majority of its sports car bodies built at Carrozzeria Fissore nearby in Savigliano; however, occasional bodies were subcontracted out to other workshops - presumably for capacity reasons. Embo manufactured at least four 375/L coupés and two 375/4 sedans.

After the market for small series vehicles became increasingly poor in the 1980s, Embo switched its activities to supplying sheet metal parts for various automobiles. Today, Embo produces body parts in large quantities for a number of European manufacturers - particularly for the spare parts sector.

== Automobiles with the brand name Embo ==
Starting in 1978, Embo produced a luxurious variant of the short wheelbase Fiat Campagnola, an all-wheel drive off-road vehicle. They also took over production of the SAMAS Yeti, a small SUV with an overall length of 3,100 mm (122.0 in) and a 2,000 mm (78.7 in) wheelbase, selling it as the Embo K/80. Three different Fiat engines were available. These were petrol engines with a displacement of 2000 cc and either 80 or 110 PS (59 or 81 kW), and a diesel engine with a displacement of 2500 cc and 72 PS (53 kW). In 1980, a visual revision took place and the K/80 was rebaptized "Mega". Production ended in 1982.

== Literature ==
- Schrader, Halwart; Amtmann, Georg (1999), Italienische Sportwagen [Italian Sports Cars] (in German), Stuttgart: Motorbuch Verlag, ISBN 9783613019881
- Georgano, G. N. (2001), The Beaulieu Encyclopedia of the Automobile, vol. 1, A–F, Chicago: Fitzroy Dearborn Publishers, ISBN 978-1579582937
