= Alejandro de Tomaso =

Argentine racing driver and businessman (1928–2003)

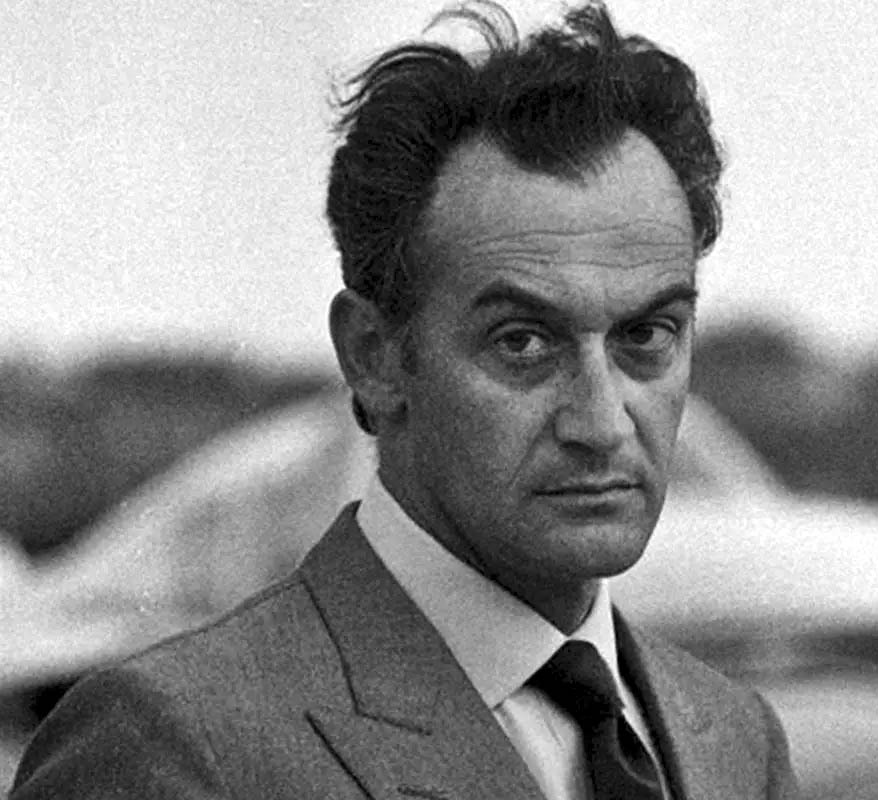
- de Tomaso c. 1965
- Born: 10 July 1928; Buenos Aires, Argentina
- Died: 21 May 2003 (aged 74); Modena, Italy

Formula One World Championship career
- Nationality: (Argentina) Argentine
- Active years: 1957, 1959
- Team(s): Scuderia Centro Sud, O.S.C.A.
- Entries: 2
- Championships: 0
- Wins: 0
- Podiums: 0
- Career points: 0
- Pole positions: 0
- Fastest laps: 0
- First entry: 1957 Argentine Grand Prix
- Last entry: 1959 United States Grand Prix

Alejandro de Tomaso (10 July 1928 in Buenos Aires – 21 May 2003 in Modena, Italy) was an Argentine racing driver and businessman. His name is sometimes seen in an Italianised form as Alessandro de Tomaso. He participated in two Formula One World Championship Grands Prix, debuting on 13 January 1957, but scored no championship points. He later founded the Italian sports car company De Tomaso Automobili in 1959.

== Life and career ==
Alejandro de Tomaso was born in Argentina, where his paternal grandfather had emigrated from Italy. His mother had Spanish origins, and was a descendant of the first viceroy of Río de la Plata, Pedro Antonio de Cevallos. His family was politically prominent. In 1955, de Tomaso was implicated in a plot to overthrow Argentine president Juan Perón, and fled to Italy. He settled in Modena and married American heiress Isabelle Haskell.

=== Auto racing ===
In 1957, de Tomaso started his career in the car industry as a Formula One racing driver for Scuderia Centro Sud, a privateer team based in Modena.

De Tomaso drove in the first race of the Formula One World Championship of Drivers, the 1957 Argentine Grand Prix, driving a Ferrari 500, finishing ninth. He did not drive again in the 1957 World Championship series, but two weeks later drove in the 1957 Buenos Aires Grand Prix, a Formula Libre race, in partnership with Maserati driver Luigi Piotti as privateers in a Maserati 250F, again finishing ninth.

De Tomaso next competed in the 1957 BRDC International Trophy in September, for Automobili O.S.C.A. in an OSCA F2, but crashed in the preliminary heat. He returned to the Formula One Grand Prix circuit in 1959 for one race. He drove for O.S.C.A. in a Cooper T43, in the 1959 United States Grand Prix, and retired when his brakes failed after 13 laps.

=== De Tomaso Automobili SpA ===
In 1959, he founded the car company De Tomaso Automobili Spa (later De Tomaso Modena). De Tomaso Automobili built prototypes and racing cars, including a Formula One car for Frank Williams' team in 1970. Starting in 1963, De Tomaso Modena also built high-performance sports cars, most of which used aluminium backbone chassis, which were to become the company's technical trademark. De Tomaso sports cars included the Vallelunga (1963), Mangusta (1966), Pantera (1971), and Guarà (1993).

De Tomaso Modena also produced luxury cars: the Deauville (1971), and Longchamp (1972).

During the 1960s and 1970s, under Alejandro's leadership, De Tomaso Modena acquired a number of Italian industrial holdings. These included the Ghia and Vignale coachbuilding studios, the Benelli and Moto Guzzi motorcycle firms, the Innocenti car company (founded as an offshoot of the British Motor Corporation to build Minis in Italy), and in 1975, the celebrated sports car maker Maserati, which was rescued from bankruptcy with the assistance of the Italian government. Over time, however, many of these holdings were sold off. In 1973, Ghia was sold to Ford (who would make much use of the name). In 1993, Innocenti and Maserati were sold to Fiat (which closed the former).

In 1993, de Tomaso suffered a stroke. He retired as head of De Tomaso Modena, succeeded by his son Santiago.

De Tomaso remained active in design work. He helped in the engineering of the sports version of the fourth generation Daihatsu Charade, introduced in 1994, which was known as the Daihatsu Charade De Tomaso.

De Tomaso died in Italy in 2003.

== Racing record ==
=== Complete Formula One World Championship results ===
(key)

Year	Entrant	Chassis	Engine	1	2	3	4	5	6	7	8	9	WDC	Points
1957	Scuderia Centro Sud	Ferrari Tipo 500	Ferrari Straight-4	ARG; 9	MON	500	FRA	GBR	GER	PES	ITA		NC	0
1959	Automobili O.S.C.A.	Cooper T43	OSCA Straight-4	MON	500	NED	FRA	GBR	GER	POR	ITA	USA; Ret	NC	0

=== Non-championship results ===
(key) (Races in bold indicate pole position) (Races in italics indicate fastest lap)

Year	Entrant	Chassis	Engine	1	2	3	4	5	6	7	8	9	10
1957	Alejandro de Tomaso	Maserati 250F	Maserati Straight-6	BUE; 9*									
1957	Alejandro de Tomaso	OSCA F2	O.S.C.A. Straight-4								INT; Ret		

* Indicates shared drive with Luigi Piotti
