= De Tomaso Deauville =

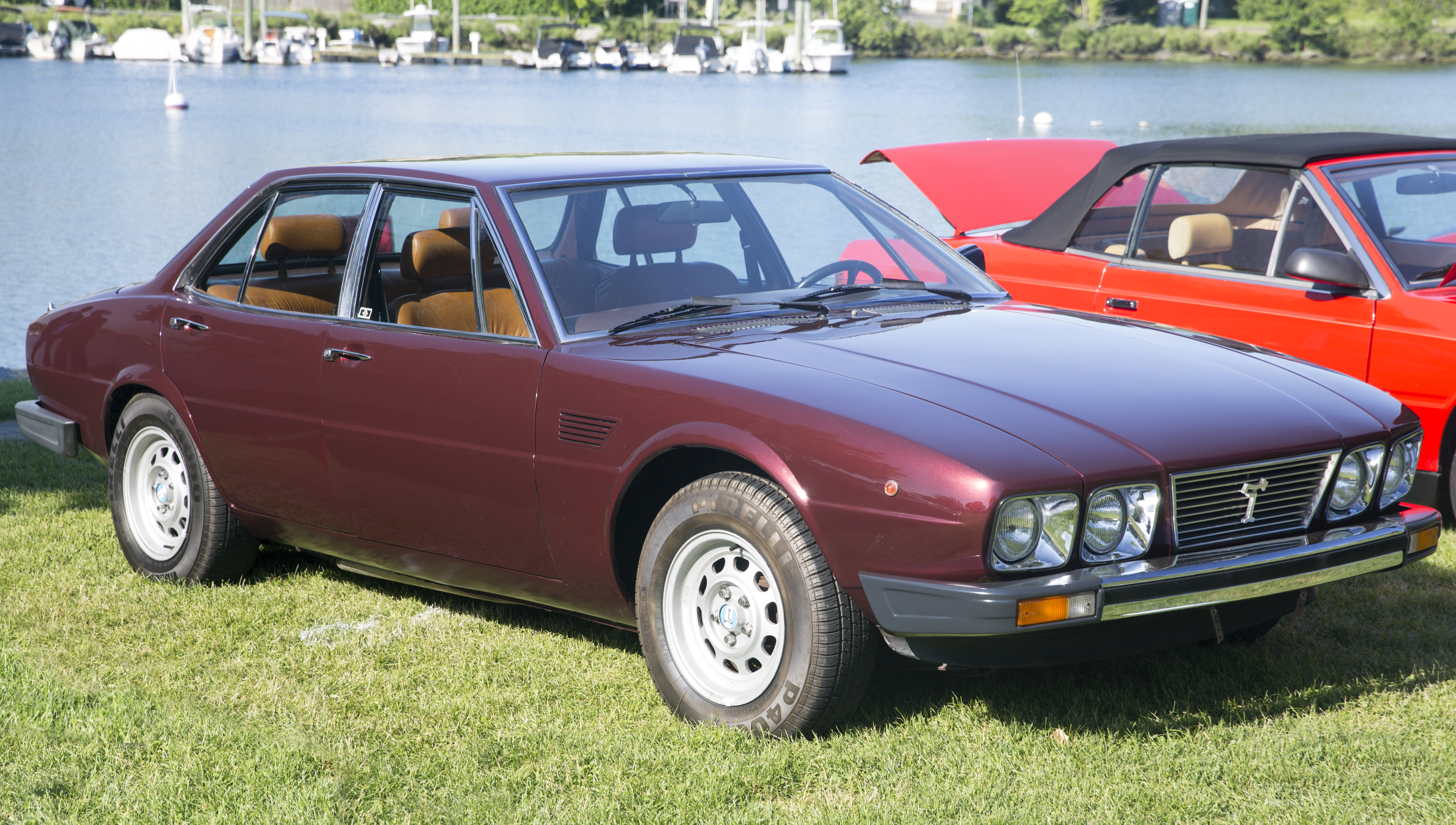
- 1983 De Tomaso Deauville

Overview
- Manufacturer: De Tomaso
- Production: 1971–1985; 244 produced
- Assembly: Italy: Modena
- Designer: Tom Tjaarda at Ghia

Body and chassis
- Class: Full-size luxury car (F)
- Body style: 4-door sedan/saloon
- Layout: Front-engine, rear-wheel-drive
- Related: Maserati Quattroporte III; De Tomaso Longchamp; Maserati Kyalami

Powertrain
- Engine: 5,763 cc (5.8 L) Ford Cleveland V8
- Transmission: 5-speed ZF manual; 3-speed Ford C6 automatic

Dimensions
- Wheelbase: 2,770 mm (109.1 in)
- Length: 4,851 mm (191.0 in)
- Width: 1,880 mm (74.0 in)
- Height: 1,372 mm (54.0 in)
- Curb weight: 1,940 kg (4,277 lb)

The De Tomaso Deauville is a luxury four-door saloon first exhibited at the 1970 Turin Motor Show. The Deauville was powered by the same 5.8 L (352 cu in) Ford Cleveland V8 as the De Tomaso Pantera, rated at 330 hp (246 kW; 335 PS). The car has a top speed of 230 km/h (143 mph) and featured styling similar to that of the Jaguar XJ.

The Deauville has an independent rear suspension very similar to that used by Jaguar, and ventilated discs front and aft. It shares its chassis with the Maserati Quattroporte III. A shorter version of its chassis underpinned the Maserati Kyalami and De Tomaso Longchamp grand tourers.

A total of 244 cars were produced. There were three Deauville variants: the early series 1 (1970–1974: serial number 10##, 11## and 12##), late series 1 (1975–1977: serial numbers 14##) and the series 2 (1978–1985: serial numbers 20## and 21##).

One Deauville station wagon was made for Mr. De Tomaso's wife. There were also two armoured Deauvilles produced, one for the Belgian royal family and the other for the Italian government. The latter is on display in the Museo delle Auto della Polizia di Stato in Rome. A third armoured Deauville seems to have been produced for an Italian businessman.

== Gallery ==
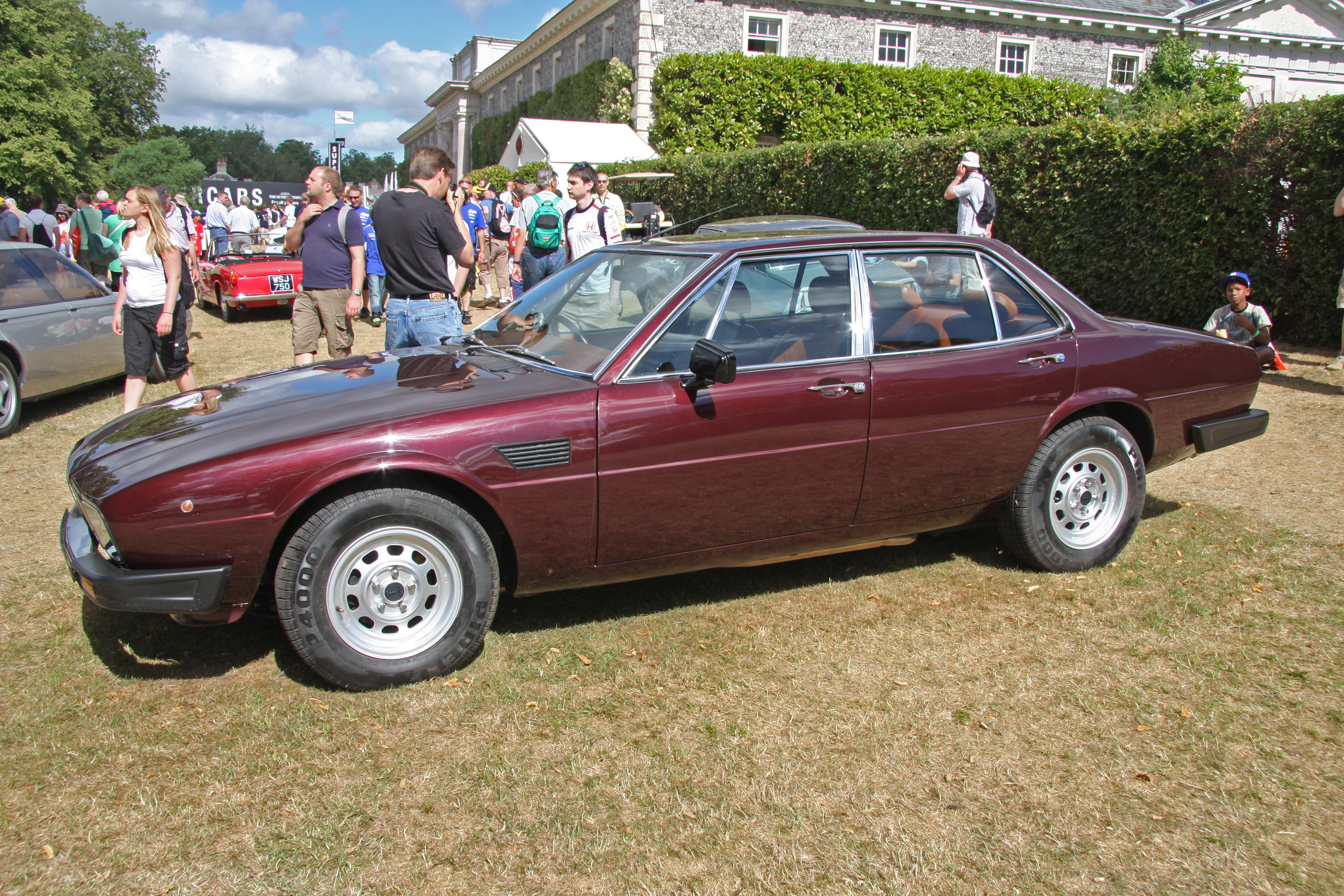
1972 De Tomaso Deauville

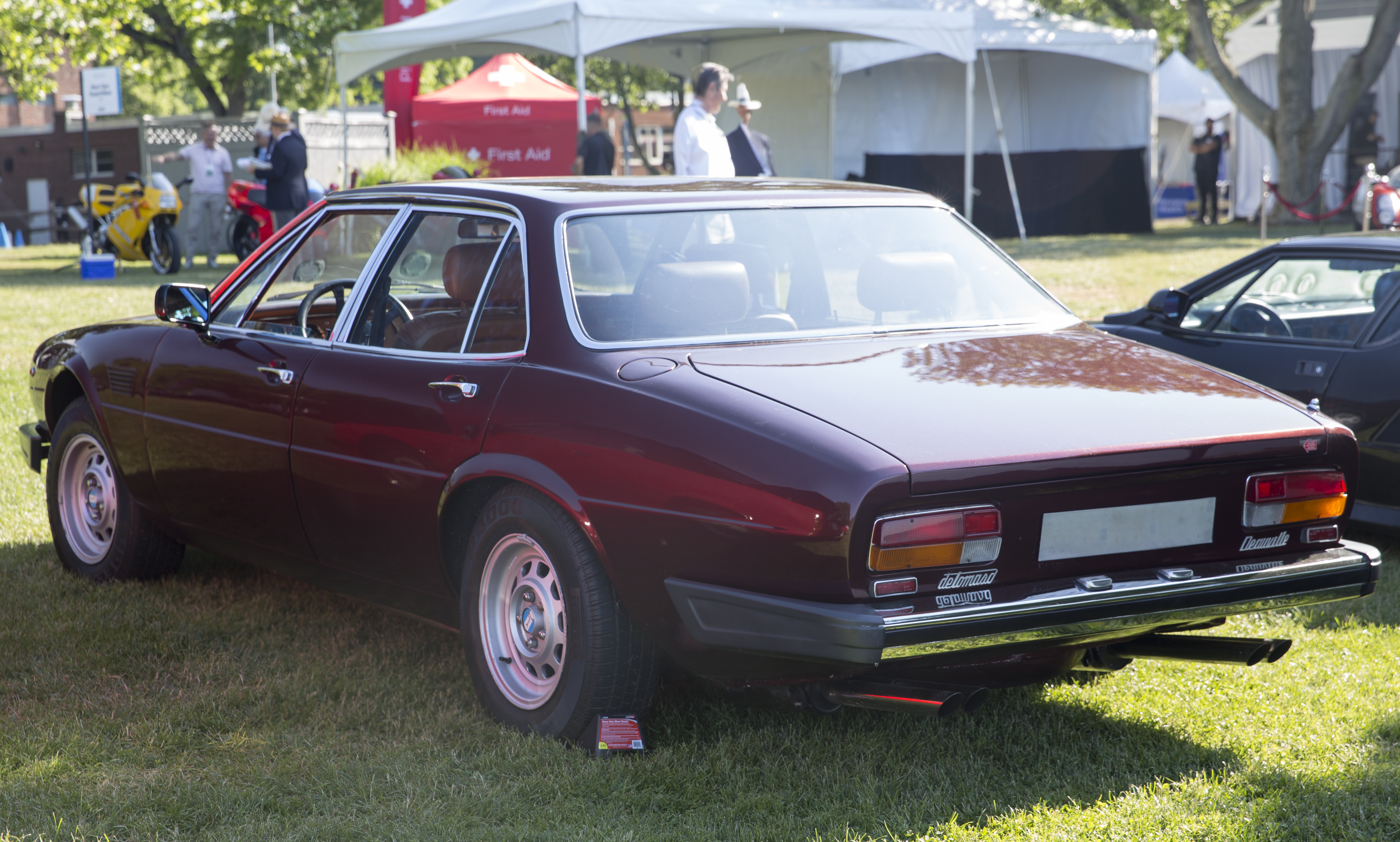
Rear view

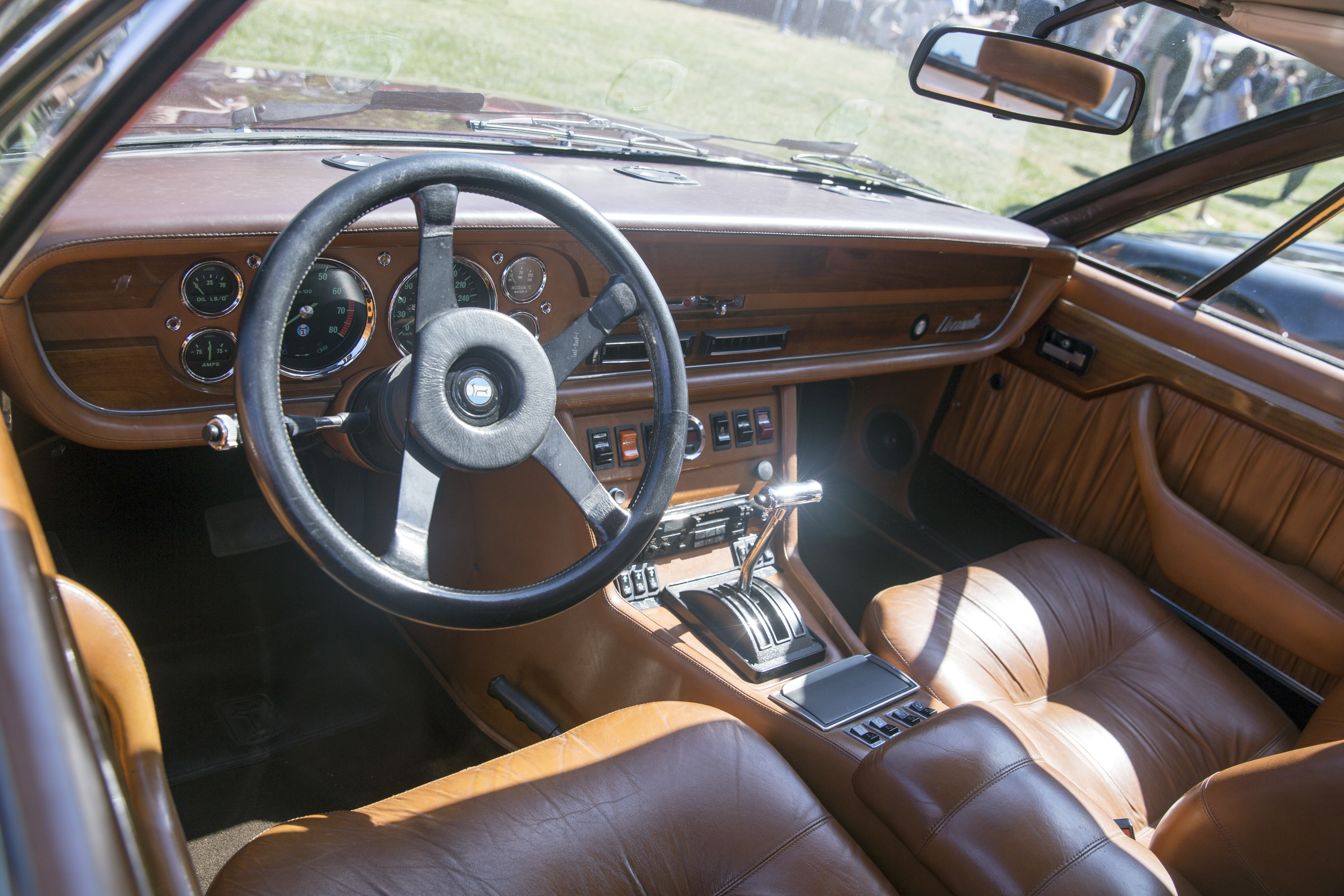
Interior (Series 2; 1983)

== 2011 concept car ==
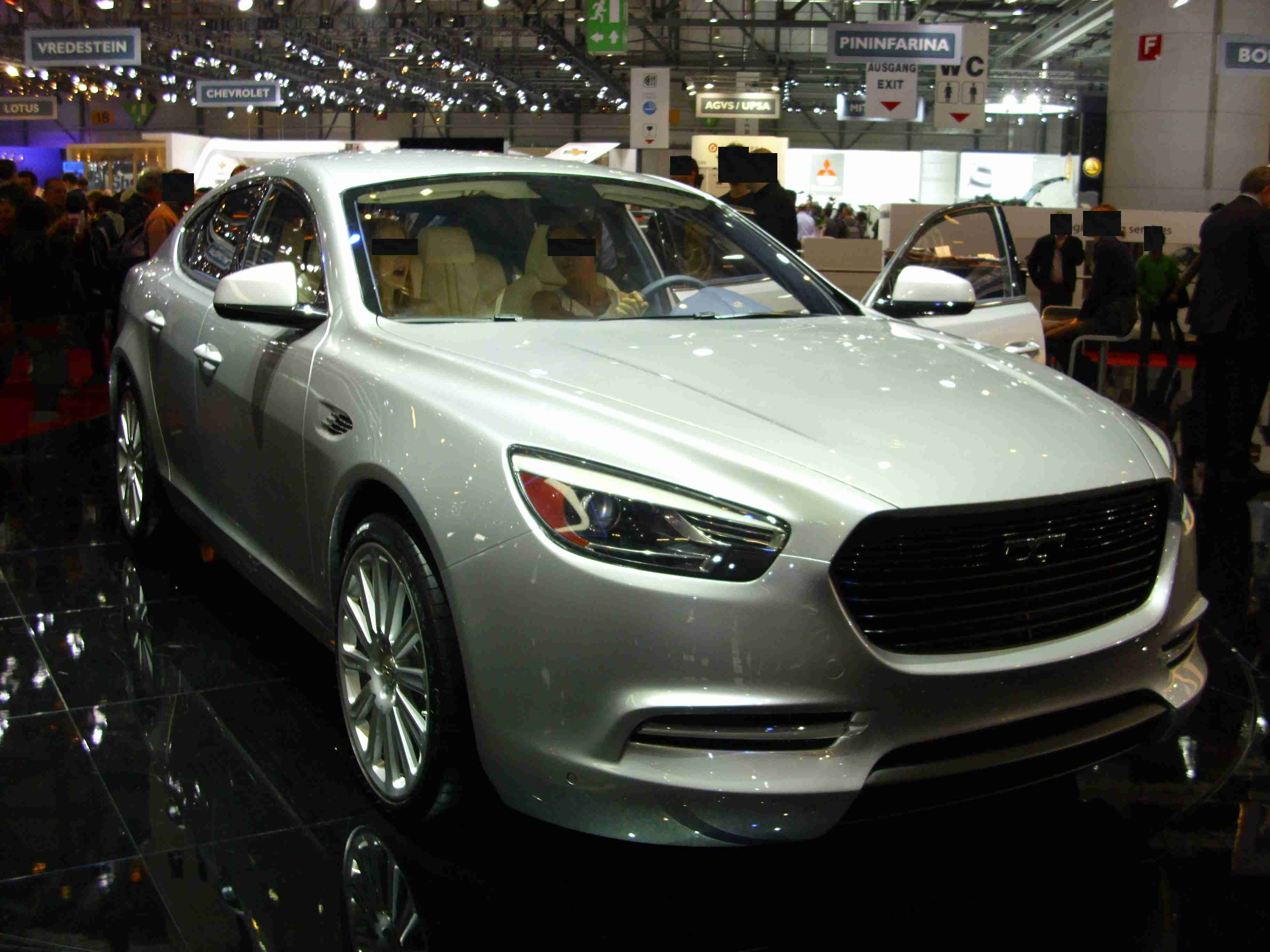
Deauville Concept at the 2011 Geneva Motor Show

At the 2011 Geneva Motor Show, the briefly resurrected De Tomaso marque presented a new model, reviving the use of the name Deauville. The new Deauville was a five-door crossover vehicle with all-wheel drive, with styling referencing models from BMW and Mercedes-Benz, and was designed by Pininfarina.

The range was to include two gasoline engines rated at 300 PS (221 kW; 296 hp) (2.8-litre V6) and 500 PS (368 kW; 493 hp) as well as a diesel engine from VM Motori with 250 PS (184 kW; 247 hp). A sports car and a limousine were to follow the crossover. The new Deauville never reached production due to arrest of the company chairman on the charges of misappropriation of funds.
