= Maserati Kyalami =

Grand touring car

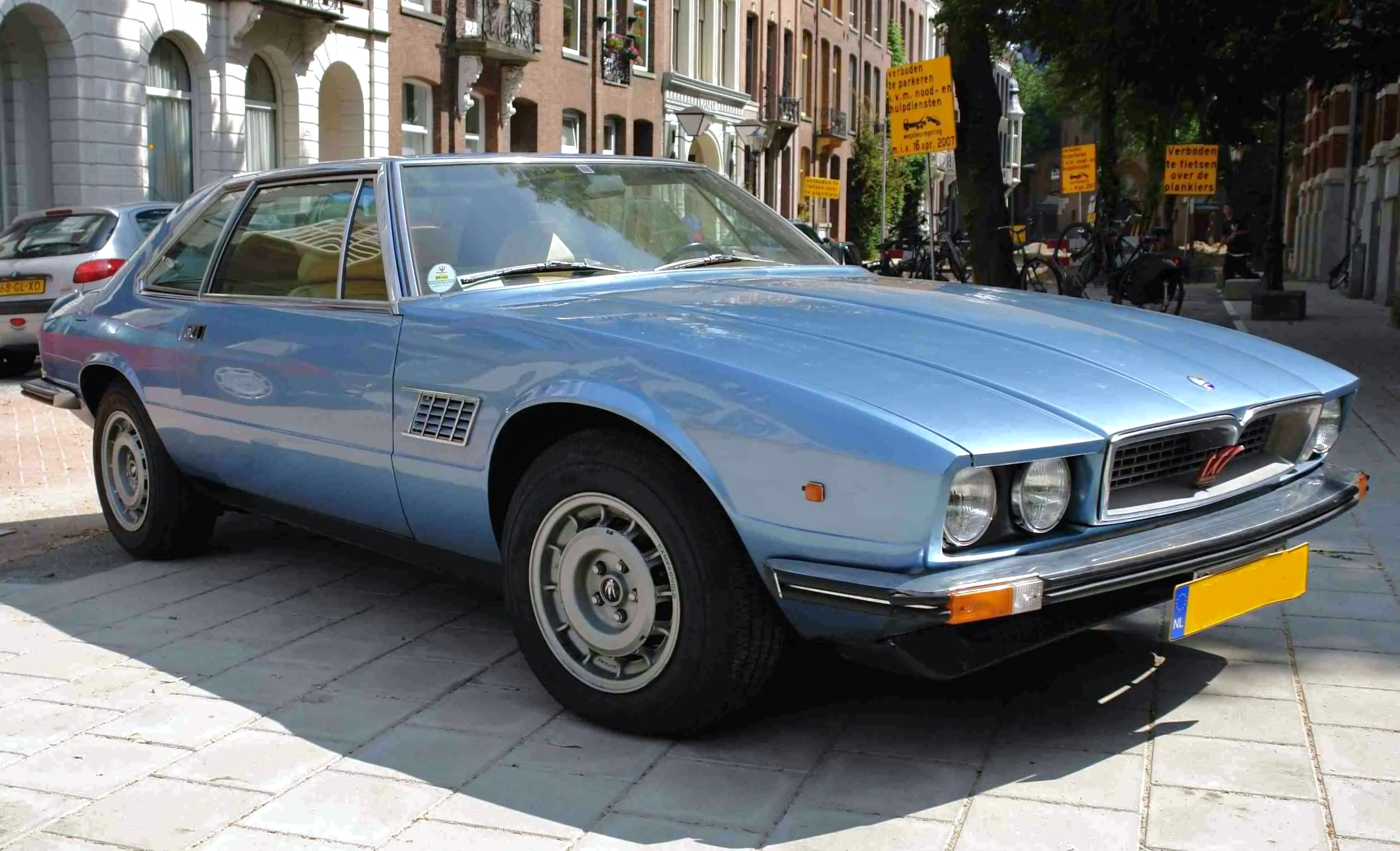

Overview
- Manufacturer: Maserati
- Production: 1976–1983; 210 produced
- Assembly: Italy: Modena
- Designer: Pietro Frua

Body and chassis
- Class: Grand tourer (S)
- Body style: 2-door, 4-seat coupé
- Related: De Tomaso Longchamp; Maserati Quattroporte III/Royale

Powertrain
- Engine: 4.2 L Tipo AM 107.21.42 V8; 4.9 L Tipo AM 107.23.49 V8
- Transmission: 5-speed ZF manual; 3-speed Borg Warner automatic

Dimensions
- Wheelbase: 2,600 mm (102.4 in)
- Length: 4,610 mm (181.5 in)
- Width: 1,870 mm (73.6 in)
- Height: 1,320 mm (52.0 in)
- Curb weight: 1,670 kg (3,682 lb)

Chronology
- Predecessor: Maserati Mexico

The Maserati Kyalami (Tipo AM129) is a four-seat GT coupé produced by Italian automobile manufacturer Maserati from 1976 to 1983. The car was named after the Kyalami Grand Prix Circuit in South Africa, where a Maserati-powered Cooper T81 won the 1967 South African Grand Prix.

== History ==
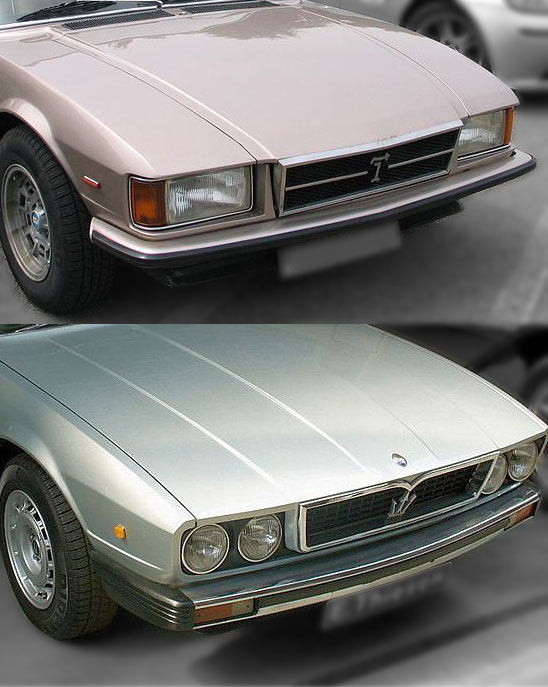
Comparison between the front end of the De Tomaso Longchamp (top) and Maserati Kyalami (bottom).

The Kyalami, a notchback, two-door grand tourer, was the first new model developed under the Alejandro de Tomaso's ownership. It was derived from, and hard to tell apart from, the Longchamp, even though they share no body panels.

When De Tomaso acquired Maserati after the demise of Citroën in 1975, he found the brand in dire financial straits. In a desperate need to develop a new flagship model to improve sales, De Tomaso had the idea to use the recently unsuccessful Longchamp as the base to save the development costs of the new model. Pietro Frua was commissioned by De Tomaso to undertake the restyling of the Tom Tjaarda-designed Longchamp to give the new car a distinctive Maserati feel. The edgy lines of the Longchamp were softened, and the headlamps were replaced by quad-round units. The car was also lowered, lengthened and widened to give it a sportier character. This move was disdained by purists and this showed in the form of declining interest in the car.

The interior was also upgraded to incorporate classic Maserati elements such as the steering wheel and Instrumentation. It was upholstered in premium Connolly leather and had plush carpeting. The boxy design of the roof meant that the car could easily seat taller passengers. A quad-cam Maserati 90-degree V8 engine was utilised to power the car, as opposed to the American-sourced Ford V8, used in the Longchamp. The Kyalami was the last car to use this engine. It was not a sales success; 210 examples were built, of which 54 were right-hand drive before it was quietly discontinued.

== Specifications and performance ==
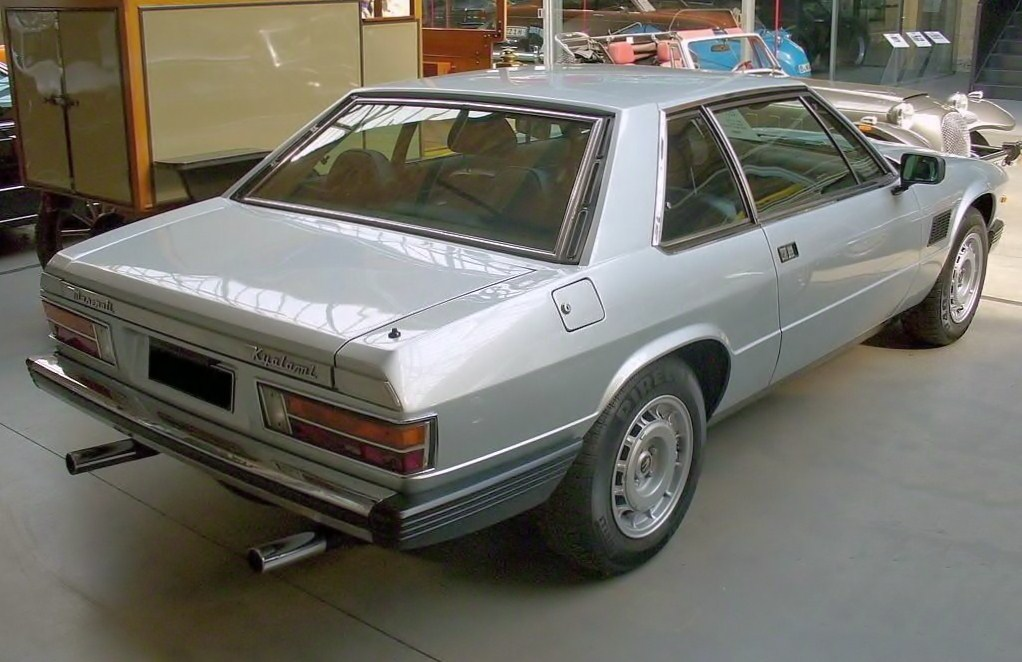
Rear view.

The Kyalami was launched at the 1976 Geneva Motor Show and was initially powered by a 265 PS (195 kW; 261 hp) 4.2 litre V8 engine with a redline of 6,000 rpm. Starting in 1978, an enlarged version of the engine was also available, displacing 4.9-litres and rated at 280 PS (206 kW; 276 hp) at 5,600 rpm. Both engines were coupled with a ZF five-speed manual transmission or, upon request, a three-speed Borg Warner automatic transmission. They were equipped with Weber downdraft carburettors and a dry sump lubrication system. Most Kyalamis built received the manual transmission.

Mechanically, the Kyalami was closely related to the contemporary Quattroporte III, which was also offered with the same engines but with a Chrysler-built automatic transmission instead of the Borg Warner unit. Maserati claimed a top speed of 240 km/h (149 mph) for both versions of the Kyalami. In recent comparison tests, the Kyalami proved to be a better-performing car than the Longchamp it was based on, primarily due to the use of a manual transmission.

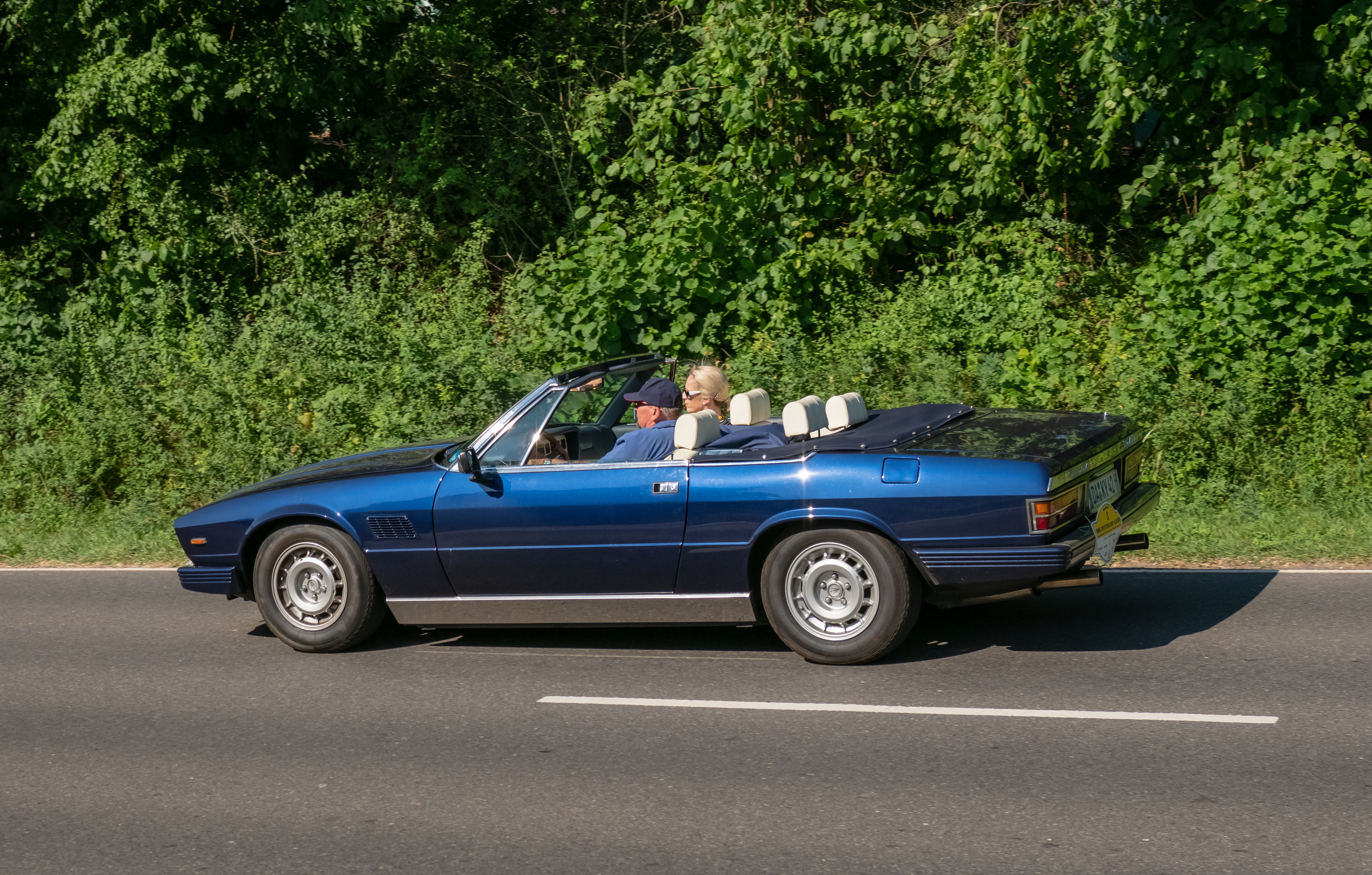
Maserati Kyalami Convertible (conversion)

A convertible prototype was built by Carrozzeria Frua but was rejected by Maserati. Nonetheless, a few customers demanded such a variant and an independent German tuning company began offering a conversion to the convertible body style. At least two cars have been known to be converted. Both of these employed the 4.2 litre engine.

== Sources ==
- Cancellieri, Gianni; al. (2003). Maserati. Catalogue Raisonné 1926-2003. Milan: Automobilia. ISBN 88-7960-151-2.
