= De Tomaso Pantera =

Italian model of sports car

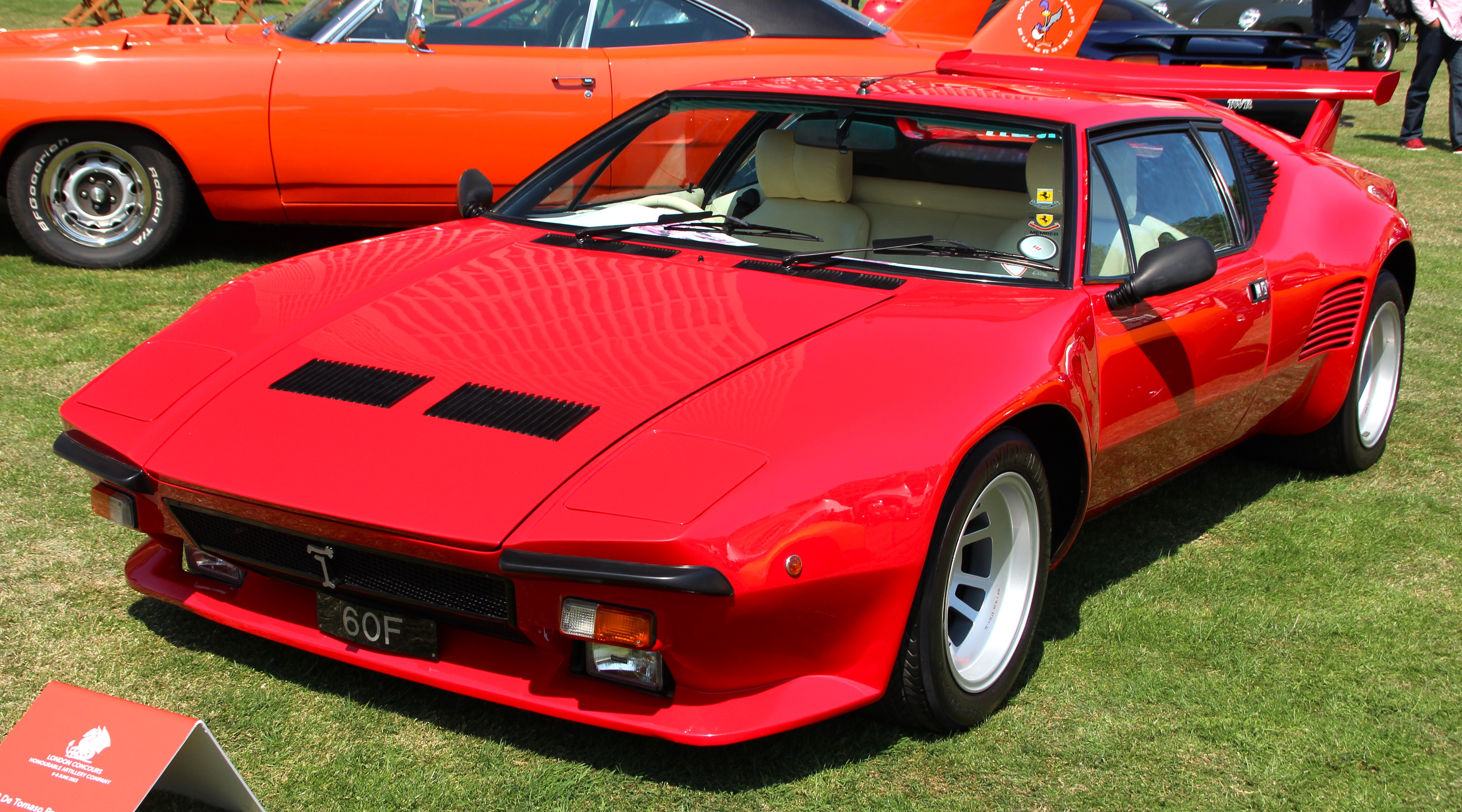
- 1990 De Tomaso Pantera GT5-S

Overview
- Manufacturer: De Tomaso Automobili
- Production: 1971–1992 (7,260 produced)
- Assembly: Italy: Modena
- Designer: Tom Tjaarda at Ghia; Marcello Gandini (Pantera SI)

Body and chassis
- Class: Sports car (S)
- Body style: 2-door coupé 2-door Targa top (Pantera SI Targa)
- Layout: Rear mid-engine, rear-drive

Powertrain
- Engine: 4.9 L (302 cu in) Ford 302 V8 (Pantera SI); 5.8 L (351 cu in) Ford Cleveland V8; 5.8 L (351 cu in) Ford Windsor V8 (1988–1990)
- Transmission: 5-speed manual ZF 5DS-25

Dimensions
- Wheelbase: 2,500 mm (98.4 in)
- Length: 4,013 mm (158 in) – early 4,270 mm (168 in) – late
- Width: 1,702 mm (67 in) – early 1,811 mm (71.3 in) – late
- Height: 1,100 mm (43 in)
- Curb weight: 1,420 kg (3,131 lb) – early 1,474 kg (3,250 lb) – late

Chronology
- Predecessor: De Tomaso Mangusta
- Successor: De Tomaso Guarà

The De Tomaso Pantera is a mid-engine sports car produced by Italian automobile manufacturer De Tomaso from 1971 to 1992. Italian for "Panther", the Pantera was the automaker's most popular model, with over 7,000 manufactured over its twenty-year production run. More than three quarters of the production were sold by American Lincoln-Mercury dealers from 1972 to 1975; after this agreement ended De Tomaso kept manufacturing the car in ever smaller numbers into the early 1990s.

== History ==
The Pantera was designed by the Italian design firm Carrozzeria Ghia's American-born designer Tom Tjaarda and replaced the Mangusta. Unlike the Mangusta, which employed a steel backbone chassis, the Pantera's chassis was of a steel monocoque design, the first instance of De Tomaso using this construction technique.

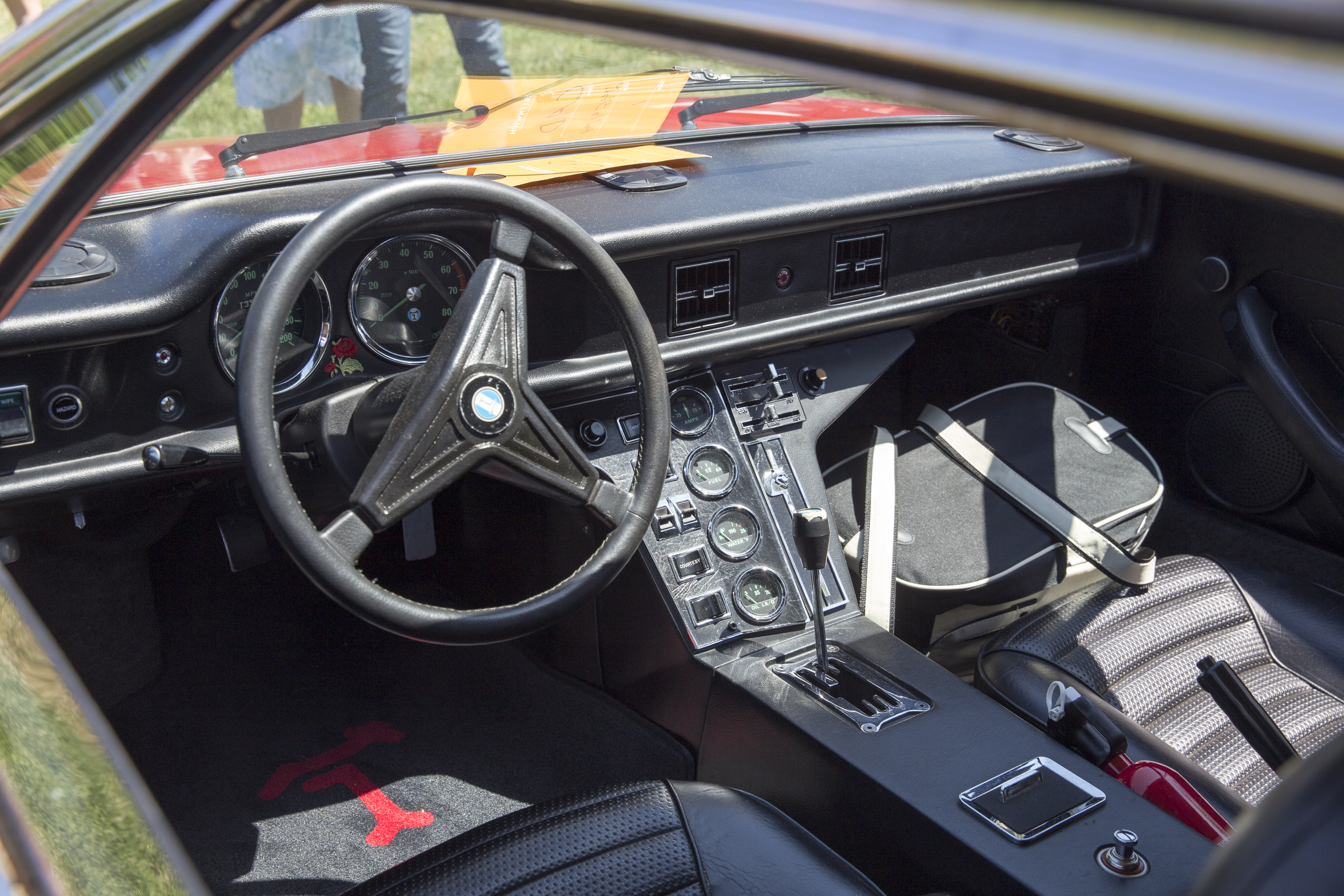
Interior (1974 Pantera L)

The car debuted in Modena in March 1970 and was presented at the 1970 New York Motor Show a few weeks later. Approximately a year later the first production cars were sold, and production was increased to three per day. De Tomaso sold the rights to the Pantera to Ford, who were to distribute the cars in the United States through its Lincoln-Mercury dealerships, while Alejandro De Tomaso retained the rights to market the Pantera in Europe.

The slat-backed seats which had attracted criticism at the New York Auto Show were replaced by more conventional body-hugging sports seats in the production cars: leg-room was generous but the pedals were off-set and headroom was insufficient for drivers above approximately 6 ft (1.83 m) tall. Reflecting its makers' transatlantic ambitions, the Pantera came with an abundance of standard features which appeared exotic in Europe, such as electric windows, air conditioning and even "doors that buzz when ... open". By the time the Pantera reached production stage, the interior was in most respects well sorted, although resting an arm on the central console could lead to inadvertently activating the poorly located cigarette lighter.

The first 1971 Pantera models were powered by a 5.8 L (351 cu in) Ford Cleveland V8 engine having a power output of 335 PS (246 kW; 330 hp). The high torque provided by the Ford engine reduced the need for excessive gear changing at low speeds: this made the car much less demanding to drive in urban conditions than many of the locally built offerings.

The ZF transaxle used in the Mangusta was also used for the Pantera: a passenger in an early Pantera recorded that the mechanical noises emanating from the transaxle were more intrusive than the well restrained engine noise. Another Italian car that shared the ZF transaxle is the Maserati Bora, also launched in 1971 although not then available for sale. Power-assisted four-wheel disc brakes and rack and pinion steering were all standard equipment on the Pantera. The 1971 Pantera could accelerate to 97 km/h (60 mph) in 5.5 seconds according to Car and Driver.

De Tomaso Pantera at Goodwood Festival of Speed 2010

In the spring of 1972, De Tomaso introduced the more sporting GTS model for the European market. The GTS was developed for Group 3 racing and received a more powerful engine with 350 PS (257 kW; 345 hp) DIN at 6000 rpm, thanks to a 11.0 : 1 compression ratio (versus 8.0 : 1 in the US market Pantera), larger Holley carburetors, a forged aluminum intake manifold, and freer flowing exhaust headers. The GTS also has considerably wider wheels, a more aggressive steering rack setup, ventilated disc brakes, adjusted spring rates and gear ratios, and conspicuous matte black body elements.

The Pantera logo included a T-shaped symbol that was the brand used by De Tomaso's Argentinian cattle ranching ancestors, as well as a version of the Argentinean flag turned on its side, inspired by the company's founder, Alejandro De Tomaso, having been born and raised in Argentina.

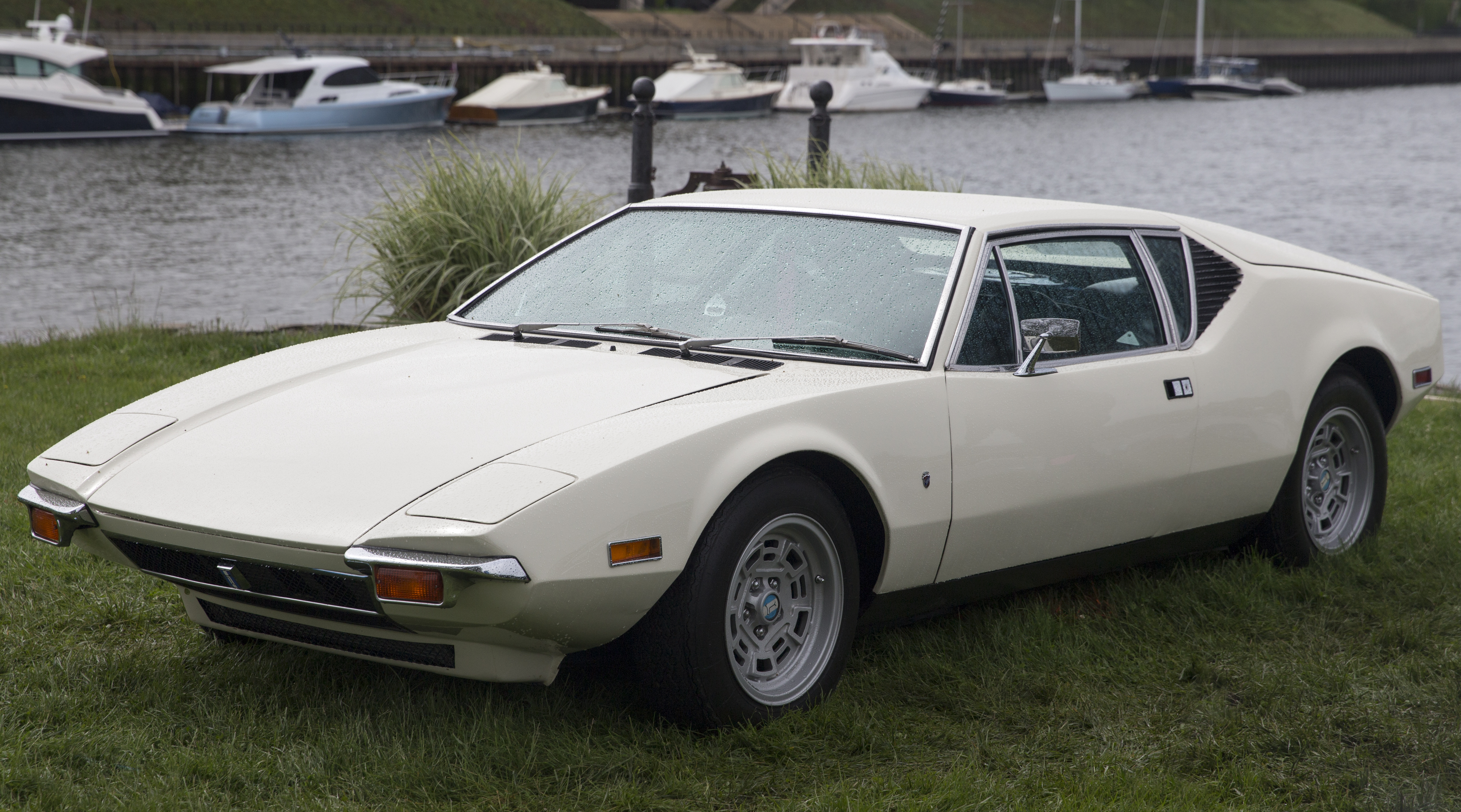
1972 De Tomaso Pantera with small bumperettes

=== In the United States ===
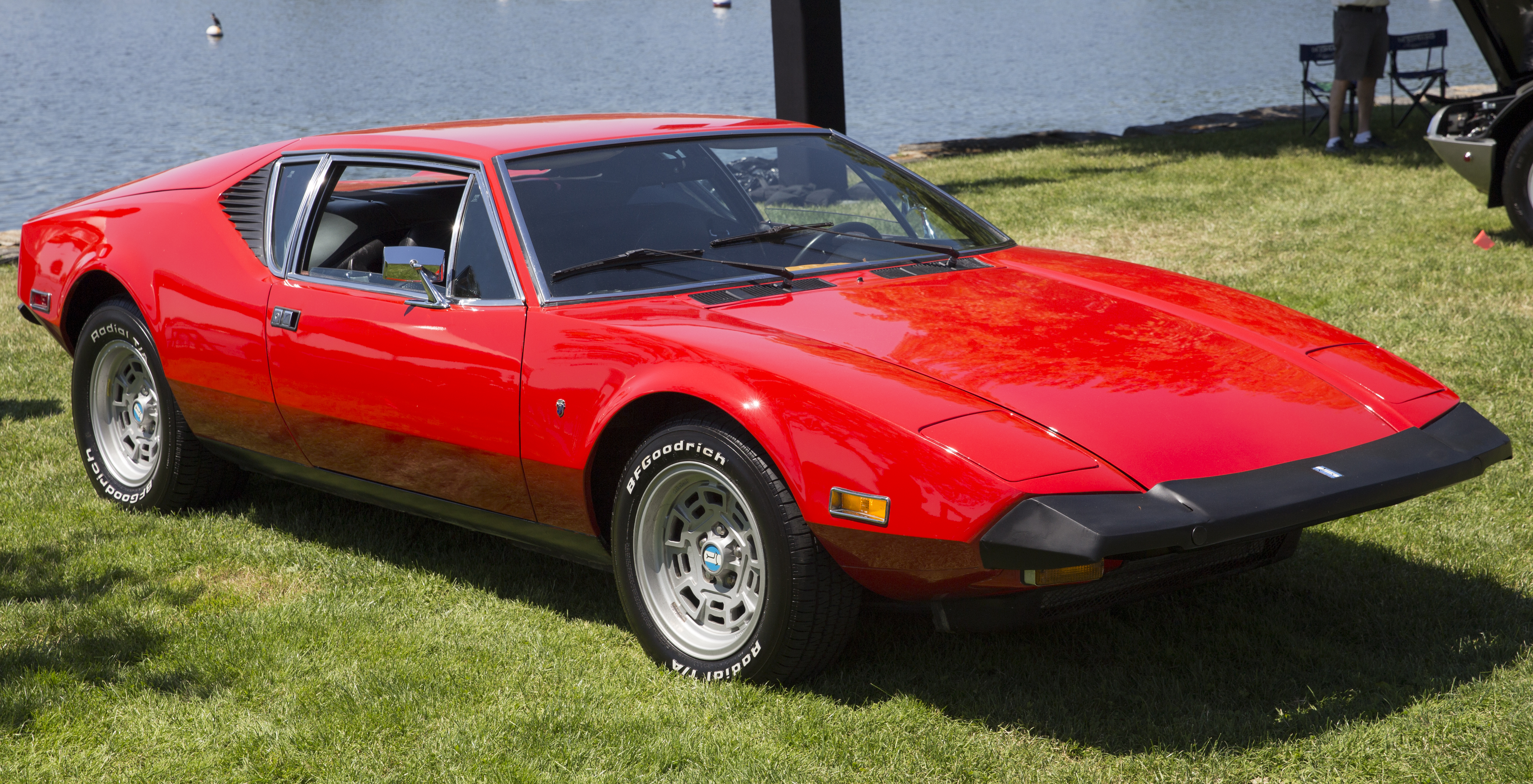
The 1973 De Tomaso Pantera L, with bigger "safety bumpers"

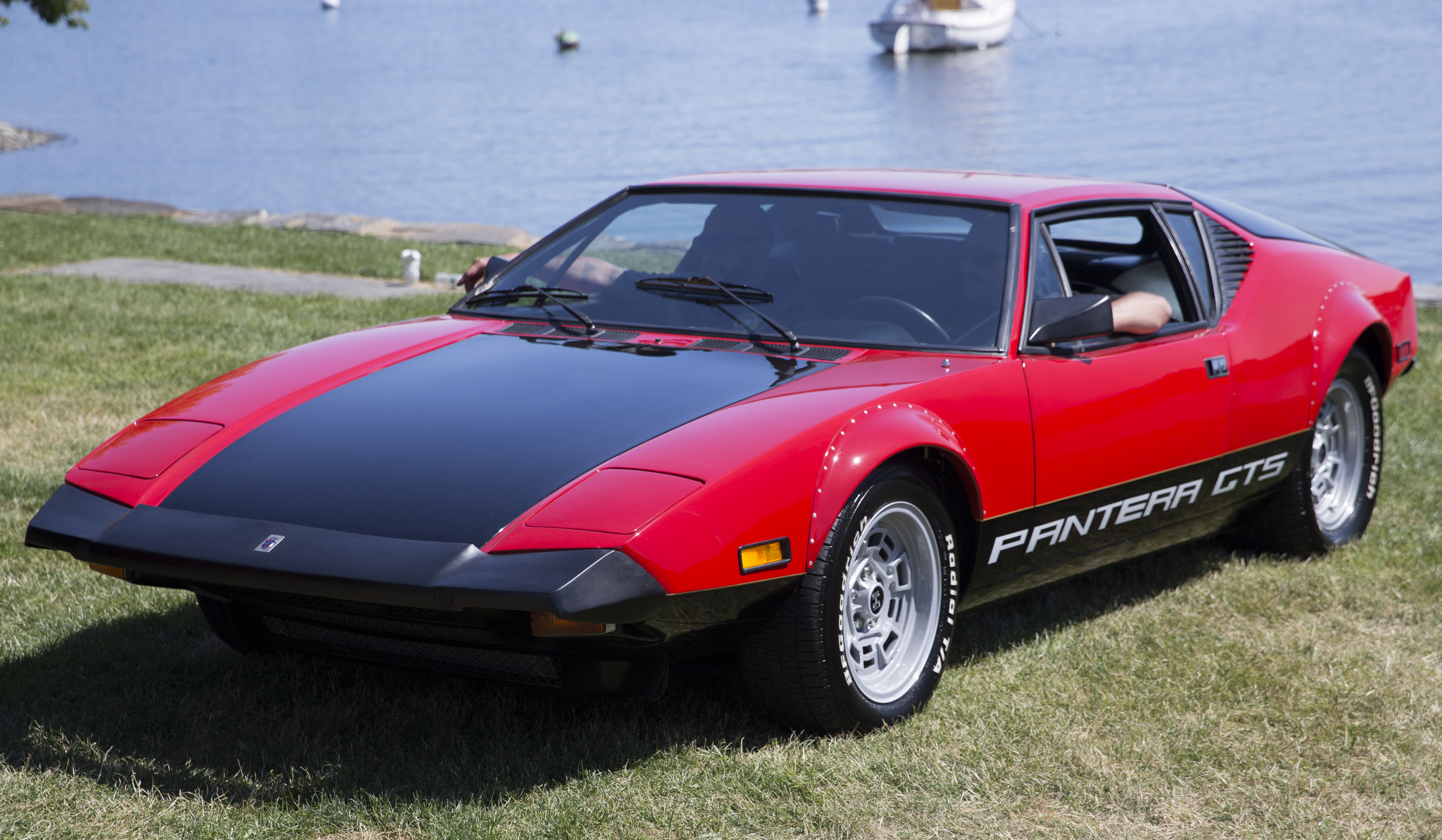
1974 Pantera GTS (US model) - note absence of De Tomaso badging

Late in 1971, Ford began importing the Pantera for the American market to be sold through its Lincoln-Mercury dealers. The first 75 cars were simply European imports and are known for their "push-button" door handles and hand-built Carrozzeria Vignale bodies. A total of 1,007 cars reached the United States that year. As with most Italian cars of the day, rust-proofing was minimal, and the quality of fit and finish on these early models was poor, with large amounts of body solder being used to cover body panel flaws. Subsequently, Ford increased its involvement in the production of later cars by introducing precision stampings for body panels, which improved overall quality.

Several modifications were made to the Pantera for the 1972 model year. A new 5.8 L (351 cu in) four-bolt main Cleveland Engine, was used with lower compression ratio (from 11:1 to 8.6:1, chiefly to meet US emissions standards and run on lower octane standard fuel) but with the more aggressive "Cobra Jet" camshaft (featuring the same lift and duration as the 428 Cobra Jet's factory performance cam) in an effort to reclaim some of the power lost through the reduction in compression ratio along with a dual point distributor. Many other engine changes were made, including the use of a factory exhaust header.

The "Lusso" (luxury) Pantera L was also introduced in August 1972 as a 1972 1/2 model. For the US market, it featured a large black single front bumper that incorporated a built-in airfoil to reduce front end lift at high speeds, rather than the separate bumperettes still used abroad, as well as the Cleveland engine then having a net power output of 264 hp (197 kW) at 5400 rpm. The "L" model featured many factory upgrades and updates that fixed most of the problems and issues the earlier cars experienced. It was so improved that the 1973 DeTomaso Pantera was Road Test Magazine's Import car of the year.beating offerings from Ferrari, Maserati, Lamborghini, and Porsche. During 1973 the dashboard was changed, deviating from two separate pods for the gauges to a unified unit with the dials angled toward the driver.

The European GTS model had sparked interest in the United States, with several grey market cars being imported and many of the performance parts being offered. In the first half of 1974 a US version of the Pantera GTS was introduced, with the first 40 cars only being available in California. This model featured GTS badging and matte black sections as well as a special steering wheel and an electric clock, but not the higher compression engine nor the wheels or other performance modifications of its European counterpart. Because of the legal acrimony between De Tomaso and Ford, these cars were sold with all De Tomaso badging removed. The wheels received "GTS" badges while the badge on the front bumper was replaced with the Ghia logo.

In 1974, Elvis Presley purchased a De Tomaso from a Cadillac dealership for $2,500. Presley fired two shots into the dashboard with a small-caliber revolver, after he couldn't get the car to start, shattering his windshield and deflating the front tire. He sold the car in 1976 where it would fall into the hands of Robert Peterson in the late 1990s, where it would be interred indefinitely at the Peterson Automotive Museum.

=== Disengagement of Ford ===
De Tomaso Pantera GT5

Ford stopped importing the Pantera to the US in 1975, having sold around 5,500 cars. De Tomaso continued to build the car in ever-escalating forms of performance and luxury for almost two decades for sale in the rest of the world. A small number of cars were imported to the US by gray market importers in the 1980s, notably Panteramerica, Stauffer Classics, and AmeriSport - Panteramerica had gotten the car recertified for US sales in 1981. After 1974, Ford discontinued the Cleveland 351 engine, but production continued in Australia until 1982. De Tomaso started sourcing their engines from Australia once the American supplies stopped. These engines were tuned in Switzerland and were available with a range of outputs up to 360 PS (265 kW; 355 hp).

After Ford had the pressing tools destroyed and Vignale went bankrupt, the supply of about 175 existing bodies-in-white produced by Vignale soon dried up. De Tomaso switched to using bodies hand-built by Maggiora in mid-1976. After a falling out over low quality work, De Tomaso switched to Embo S.p.A., who went on to build the next 504 Panteras from 1979 until the end of production. According to De Tomaso the chassis was completely revised in around 1980, skipping ahead from 7554 to chassis number 9000 (although most independent sources agree that the 9000-series cars were made after June 1976 by Maggiora, while Embo-bodied cars started over again from 9100). From May 1980, the lineup included the GT5, which had bonded and riveted-on fibreglass wheelarch extensions and from November 1984 the GT5-S model which had blended arches and a distinctive wide-body look. The GT5 also incorporated better brakes, a more luxurious interior, much larger wheels and tires and the fiberglass body kit also included an air dam and side skirts. Production of the wide body GT5 (and similarly equipped narrow body GTS models) continued until 1985, when the GT5-S replaced the GT5. Although the factory has not made its records available, an analysis based on Vehicle Identification Numbers by the Pantera Owners Club of America (POCA) late model (9000 series) registrar has shown that fewer than 197 GT5 Pantera models were likely to have been built. The GT5-S featured single piece flared steel fenders instead of the GT5's bolted-on fiberglass flares, and a smaller steel front air dam. The 'S' in the GT5-S name stood for "steel". Otherwise the GT5-S was largely identical to the GT5. The POCA 9000 series registrar's VIN analysis indicates that fewer than 183 GT5-S Panteras were built. Concurrent GTS production continued, on a custom order and very limited basis, until the late 1980s.

The car continued to use a Ford V8 engine, although in late 1986, when the supply of Ford 351 Cleveland engines from Australia ran out, De Tomaso gradually began supplanting them with Ford 351 Windsor engines in the Pantera instead. In all, about 7,260 cars in total were built.

=== Pantera 90 Si ===
In 1990 the 351 engine was replaced by the 4.9 L (302 cu in; 4,942 cc) Ford 302 engine featuring electronic fuel injection and modified cylinder heads, intake manifolds, camshafts, valves, and pistons. Stopping power was improved by the addition of four-wheel ventilated and drilled disc brakes with Brembo calipers that were shared with the Ferrari F40. The Pantera received new styling penned by Marcello Gandini, suspension redesign and a partial chassis redesign. The new model was called the Pantera 90 Si and it was introduced in 1990. The taillights came from the facelifted, first series Alfa Romeo 33. Only 41 90 Si models were made before the Pantera was finally phased out in 1993 to make way for the radical Guarà. Out of the 41 cars made, two were used for crash testing, and one was reserved for the De Tomaso museum. As such, only 38 were sold to the public, of which four were converted to Targas by Pavesi. In the UK, the model was sold as Pantera 90.

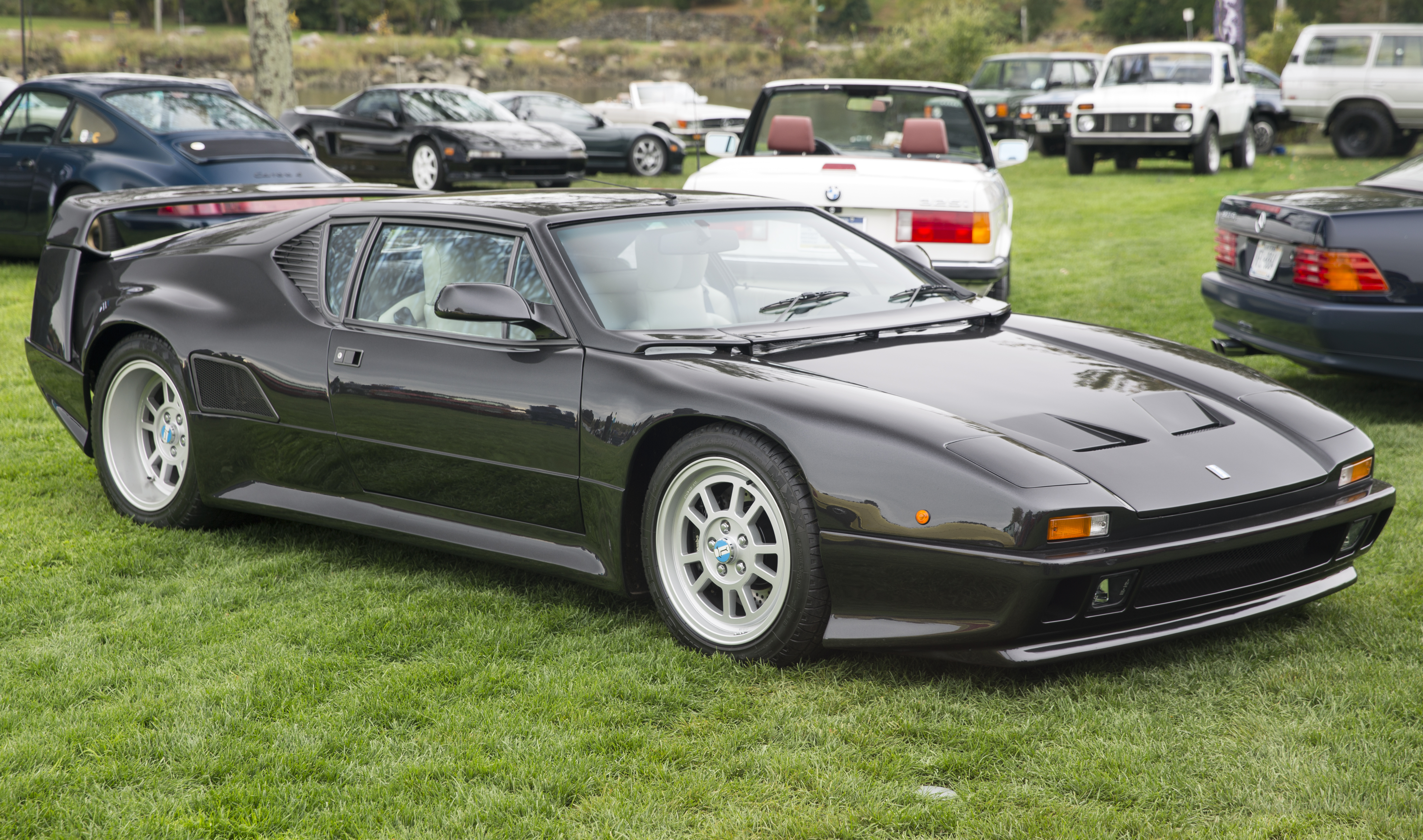
De Tomaso Pantera 90 Si

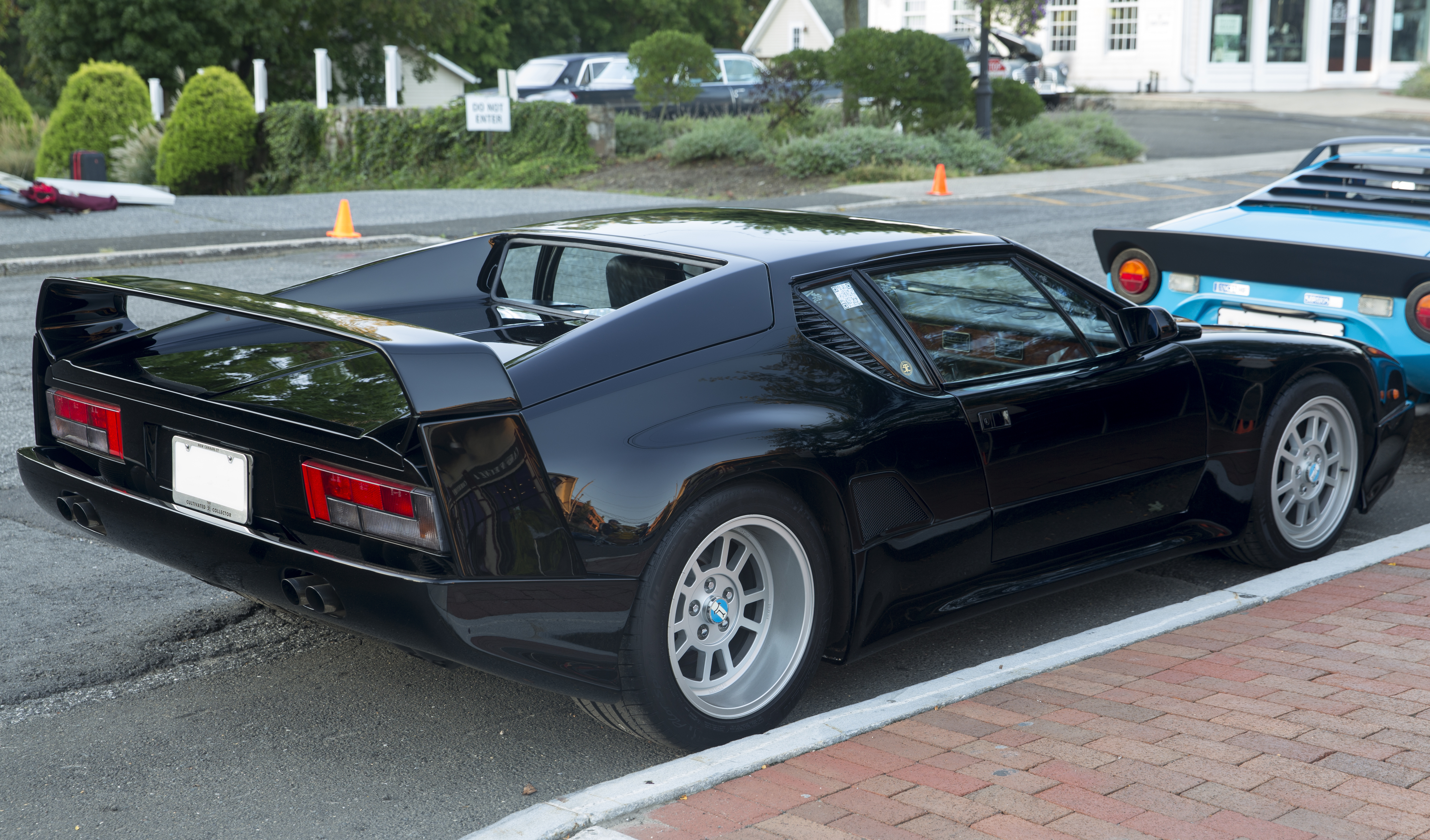
Rear view

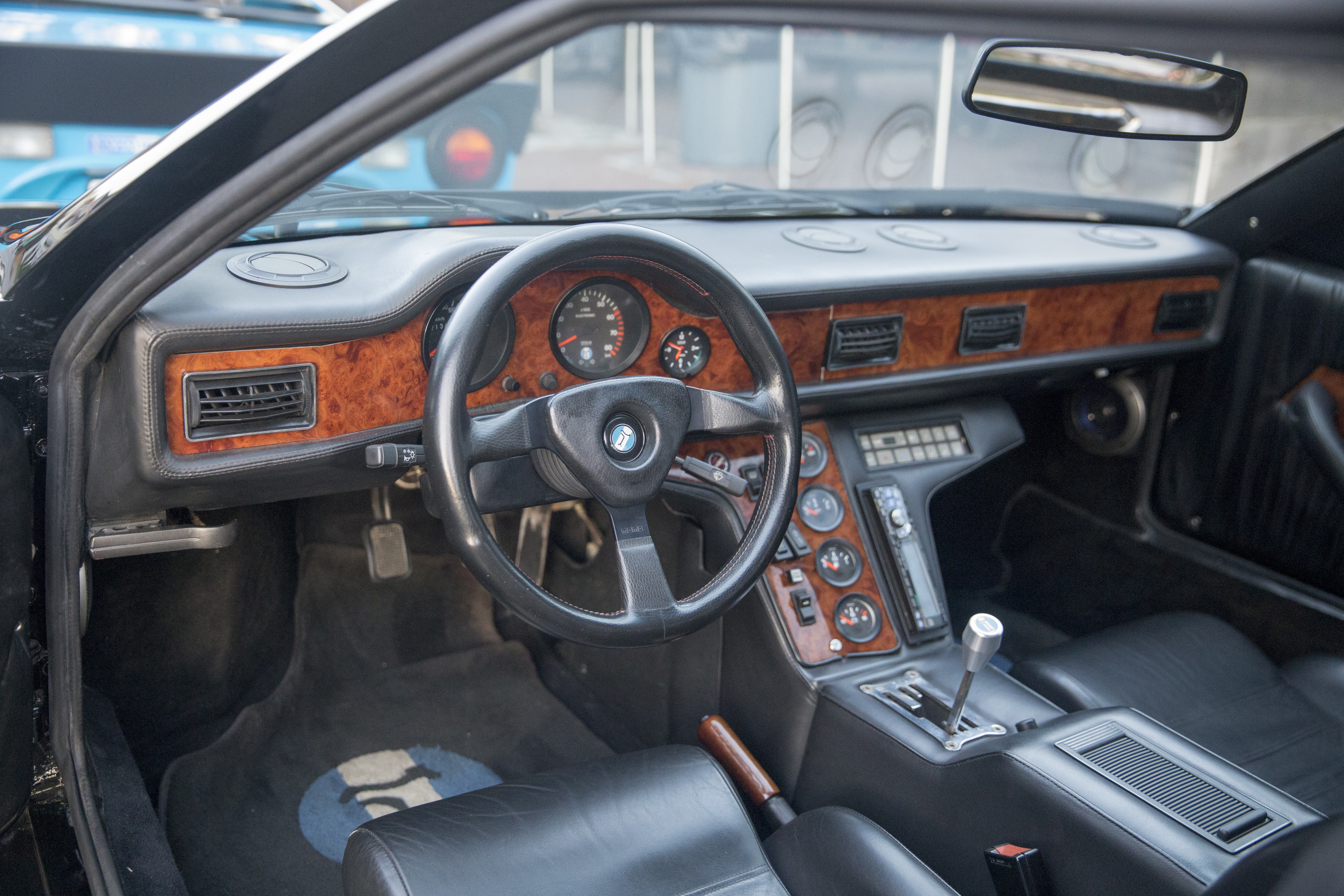
The interior revealed the Pantera's early 1970s origins

== Specifications ==
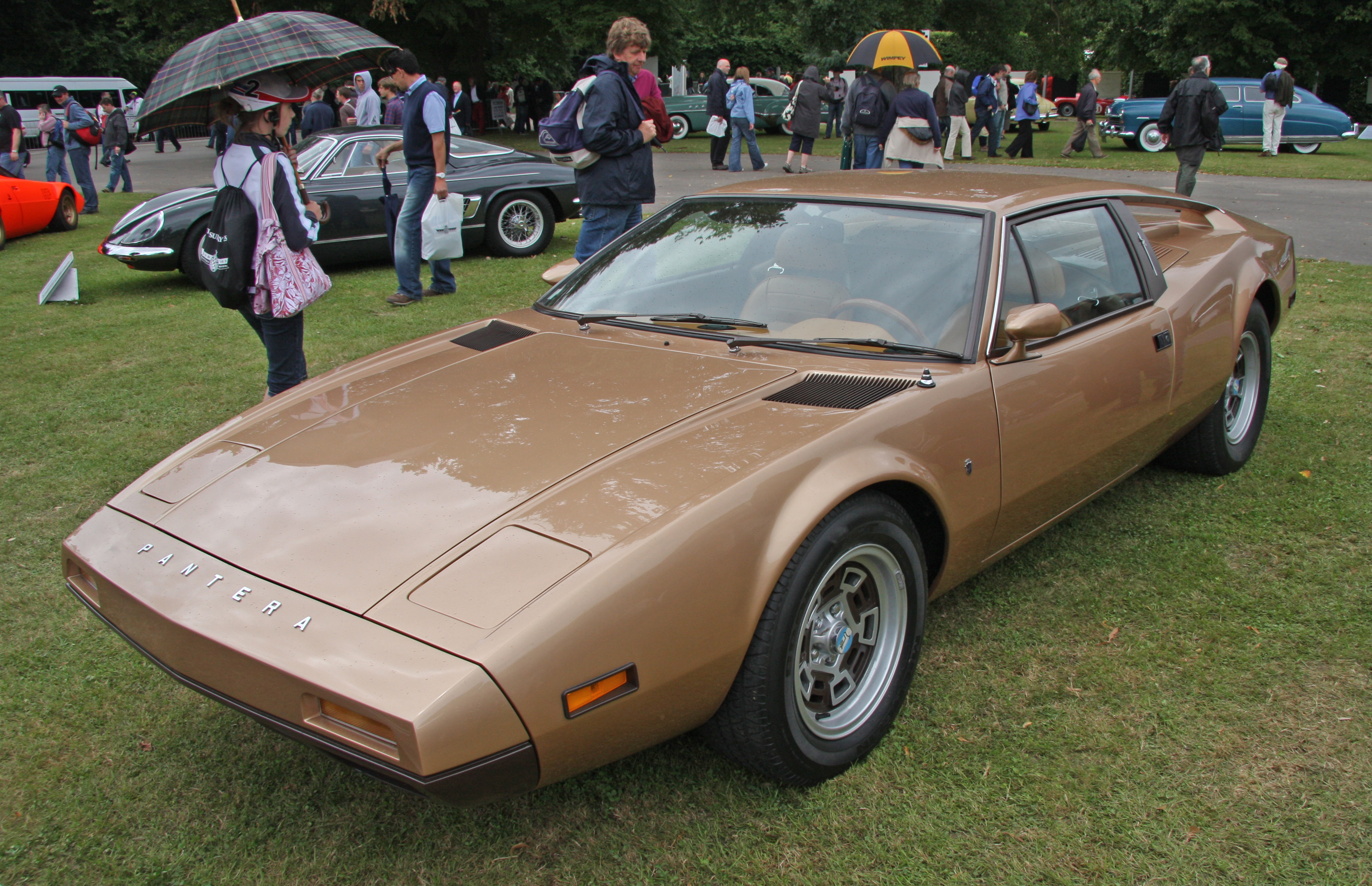
A one-off second generation Pantera 7X or Montella prototype made by Ghia.

Model year
Specification data	1971 L	1988 GT5 S
Engine configuration	351 cu in (5.8 L) Naturally aspirated Ford Cleveland V8	
Fuel system	Autolite 4-barrel carburetor	Holley 4-barrel carburetor
Curb weight	1,420 kg (3,131 lb)	1,474 kg (3,250 lb)
Wheelbase	2,515 mm (99 in)	
Front track	57.0 in (1,448 mm)	59.4 in (1,509 mm)
Rear track	58.0 in (1,473 mm)	62.2 in (1,580 mm)
Length	158.0 in (4,013 mm)	168.1 in (4,270 mm)
Width	67.0 in (1,702 mm)	77.6 in (1,971 mm)
Height	43.4 in (1,102 mm)	43.3 in (1,100 mm)
Brakes	Front: 279 mm (11.0 in) ventilated; Rear: 302 mm (11.9 in) ventilated	Front: 284 mm (11.2 in) ventilated; Rear: 297 mm (11.7 in) ventilated
Power	243 kW (330 PS; 325 hp) at 5,400 rpm	257 kW (350 PS; 345 hp) at 6,000 rpm
Torque	344 lb⋅ft (466 N⋅m) at 3,500 rpm	333 lb⋅ft (451 N⋅m) at 3,800 rpm
Fuel economy	Highway (Extra-urban): 14.6 mpg_{‑US} (16.1 L/100 km; 17.5 mpg_{‑imp})	
Compression ratio	11.0:1	9.5:1
Gearbox	5-speed ZF manual transmission	
Maximum speed	159 mph (256 km/h)	174 mph (280 km/h)

== Motorsports ==
=== Group 3 ===
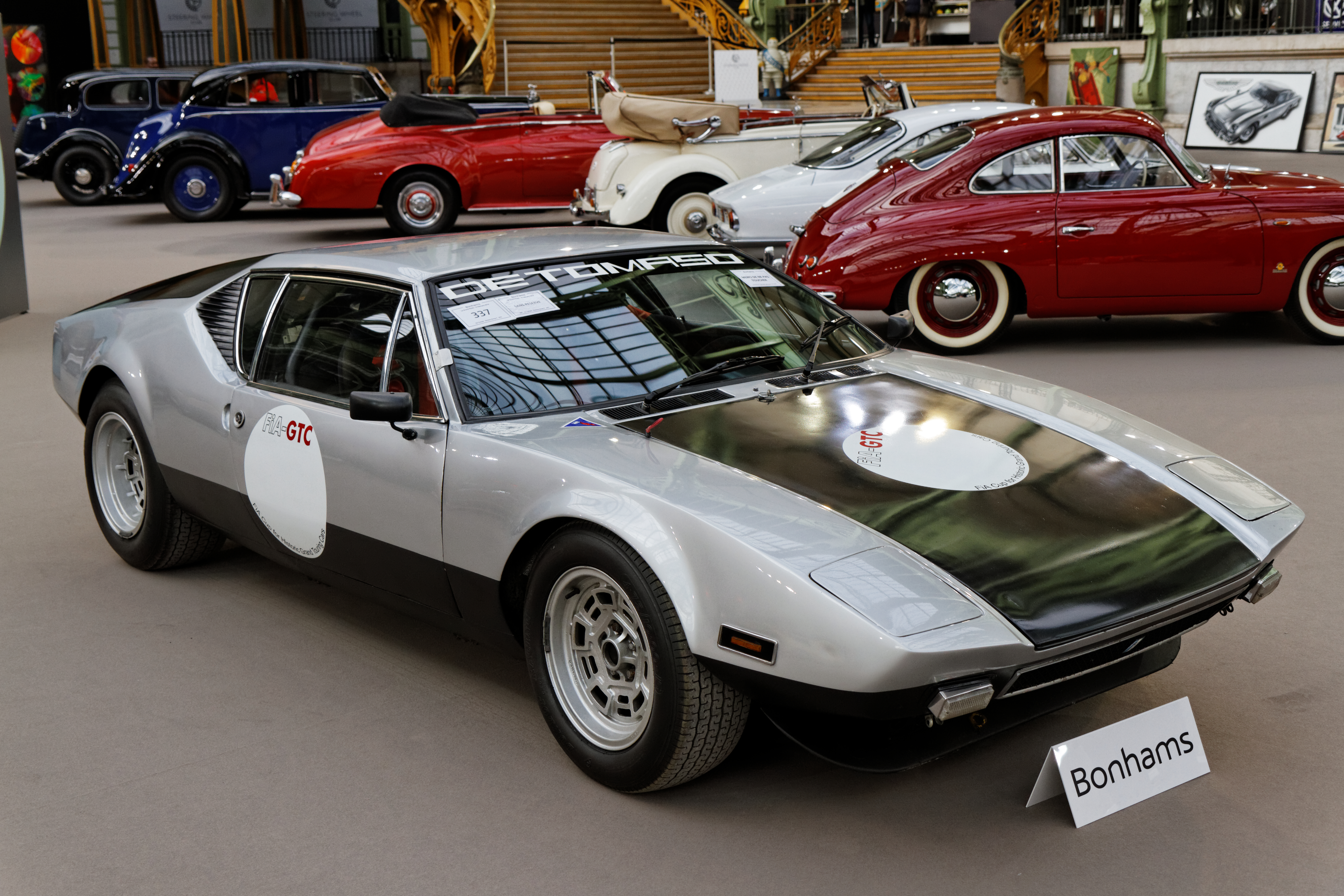
A De Tomaso Pantera GTS Group 3 prototype

De Tomaso offered a Pantera competition car built to special order according to the Group 3 class racing rules between 1972 and 1984 based on the Pantera GTS. 30 cars were built for private customer teams. Group 3 rules were very strict and allowed little modifications to the original road going production cars. Earlier Group 3 cars are infamously called "push button" chassis cars as they were built by hand because De Tomaso did not have a proper assembly line when the Pantera began production. Special equipment of the Group 3 cars included Campagnolo wheels (15 x 8 inches at the front and 15 x 10 inches at the rear), adjustable Koni shocks, racing brakes and special safety equipment required at the time: plexi-glass windows with cutouts, a roll bar, fire extinguisher and racing bucket seats. The engine modifications included a reinforced camshaft, a 10-litre oil pan and a Holley racing 4 barrel carburetor. The engine had a power output of 336 PS (247 kW; 331 hp). The engine was mated to a 5-speed close ratio gearbox with a heavy duty single plate clutch and a limited slip differential. It was reported that with the long ratio gears, the Group 3 cars could achieve a top speed up to 280 km/h (174 mph). The Group 3 cars were so competitive that this prompted Porsche to speed up development of the more powerful 911 Carrera RS and Carrera RSR race cars. The use of racing brakes for the Pantera Group 3 was not allowed until 1975 and the car competed with the brakes of the road legal Pantera which proved to be its weak point. Due to an accident in 1973 at the Charade circuit, reinforced hubs developed by De Tomaso for the Group 3 car were approved in Group 3.

=== Group 4 ===
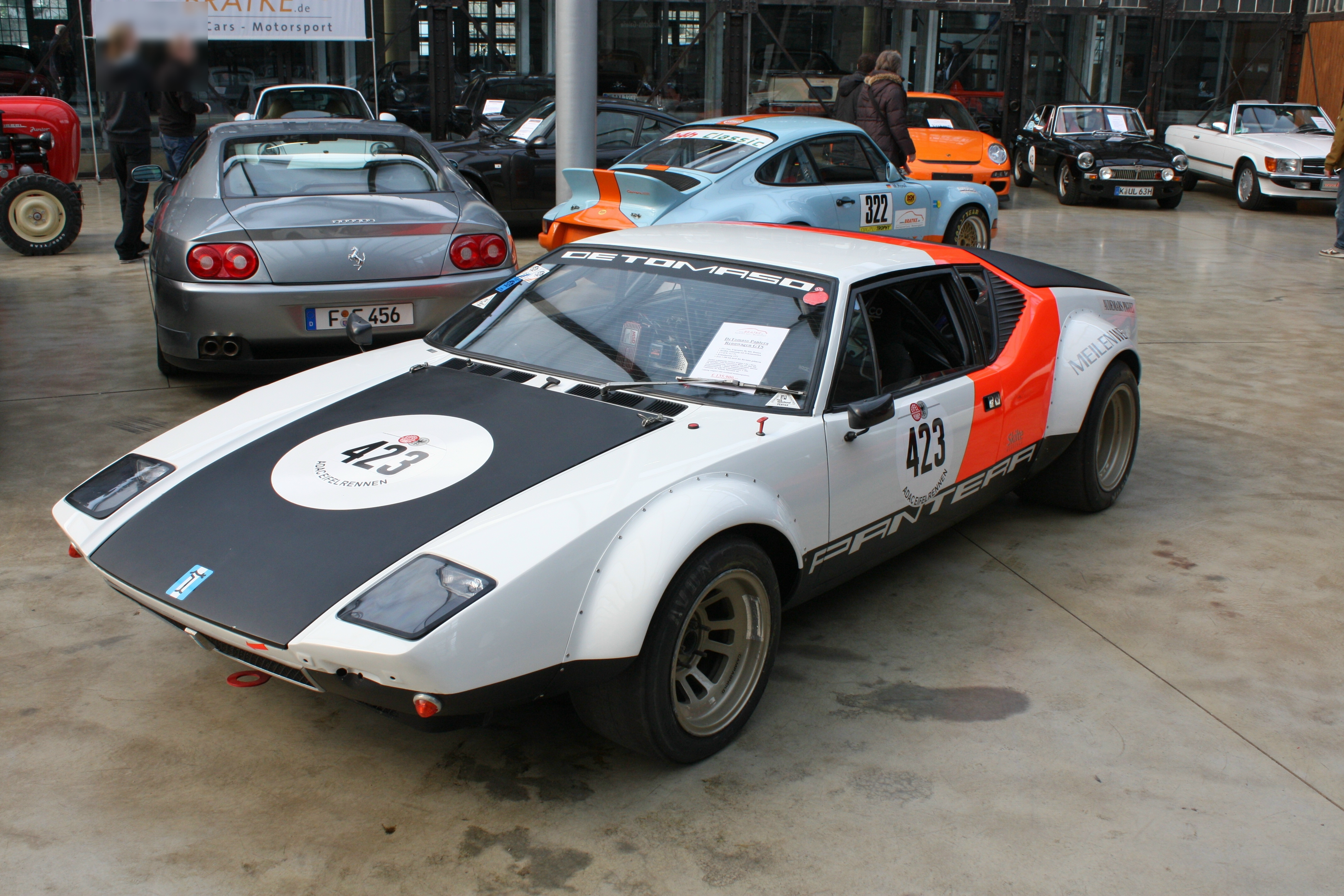
A De Tomaso Pantera GTS Group 4 competition car

After the Pantera had begun production, De Tomaso introduced a motorsport oriented Group 3 version of the car. This was followed by a modified Group 4 version in 1972. British engineer and driver Mike Parkes, who had previously developed racing cars for Ferrari was tasked with the development of the new car.

As per the regulations, the Group 4 car was based around the road car's steel monocoque chassis. The double wishbone suspension was substantially modified and Koni adjustable shocks were used in order to improve handling at the track and make room for wider Campagnolo wheels and tyres. Bigger ventilated brakes supplied by Girling and a quick ratio steering rack were used to refine handling and stopping power. The standard steel body shell of the Pantera also received modifications such as aluminium doors, front lid and engine cover along with flared fibre glass wheel arches in order to accommodate the wide wheels and tyres. Plexi glass windows were used throughout and holes were cut into the chassis where possible in order to reduce weight. The car had no front or rear bumpers and a front deep chin spoiler. It also had no rustproofing or interior amenities. The interior was fitted with a cut-off switch instead of a radio, light weight cloth bucket racing seats, a vinyl trim, a roll-cage and drilled aluminium pedals. The final car had a weight of 1,100 kg (2,425 lb).

Ford, providing a good amount of financial backing in the development of the road going Pantera had little interest in the motorsport version of the car and refused to supply engines for the Group 4 Pantera. De Tomaso engaged a private US based engine builder Bud Moore to supply engines for the car.

Based on the same Ford 351 Cleveland V8 engine used in the road going Pantera, the engine in the Group 4 Pantera was fitted with bespoke aluminium heads, TRW forged pistons, large capacity oil pans and titanium valves. Initially, a single Holley Racing 1150 CFM four barrel carburetor was fitted but this was replaced by four Weber carburetors and a revised intake. The engine had a higher compression ratio of 12.0:1. Displacement of the racing engine was unchanged from road going Pantera's engine. The "spaghetti" styled exhaust system similar to the one used in the Ford GT40 was used. The engine had a claimed power output of 507 PS (373 kW; 500 hp), although the cars ran at a power output of 446 PS (328 kW; 440 hp) at 7,000 rpm, which was increased to 477 PS (351 kW; 470 hp) when the Weber 850 CFM carburetors were used. The engine was mated to a ZF 5-speed close ratio manual transmission with a heavy duty single clutch plate.

The first Group 4 Panteras were entered into the 1972 24 Hours of LeMans. The problems of the car then began to become apparent. The engine proved to be unreliable and the car was also subject to a weight penalty, increasing the weight to 1,250 kg (2,756 lb). This was set reportedly high due to Porsche's influence over the governing body of the race. Another problem of the car was the rigidity of its chassis. Nevertheless, the car continued to compete in Group 4 and the engine problem was addressed by sourcing replacement engines with a lower compression ratio. A total of 14 Group 4 cars were made. Some Group 3 cars were modified to Group 4 specifications by privateers.

=== Group 5 ===
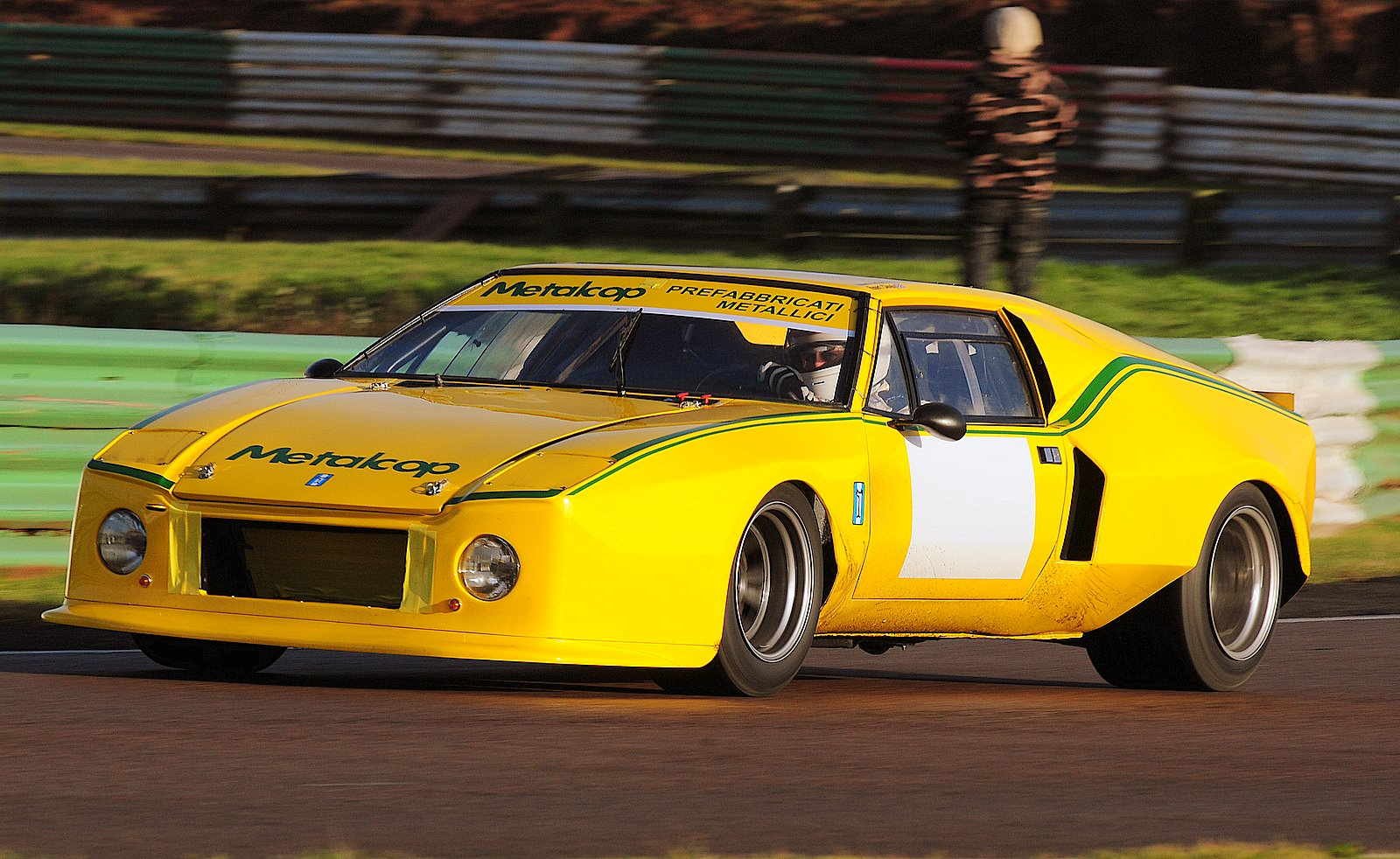
De Tomaso Pantera Group 5 competition car

The Group 5 Pantera race cars were converted by private racing teams from Group 4 and Group 3 cars and competed in Group 5 class racing from 1976 to 1981. The Group 5 cars only had wider body panels and no significant design, mechanical and chassis modifications.

However, two cars were extensively modified to compete in the IMSA GTX and Group 5 class respectively. The first car having chassis number #001 was constructed from a new chassis by Italian racing team Sala and Marveti. The second car, having chassis number #1603 was a Group 4 car campaigned by Hugh Kleinpeter in the US and then underwent modification. Afterwards, the former was converted to Group C class specifications in 1983 and the latter was converted to IMSA GTP class specifications respectively. Both cars were uncompetitive in their categories.

== Ares Design Project1 ==
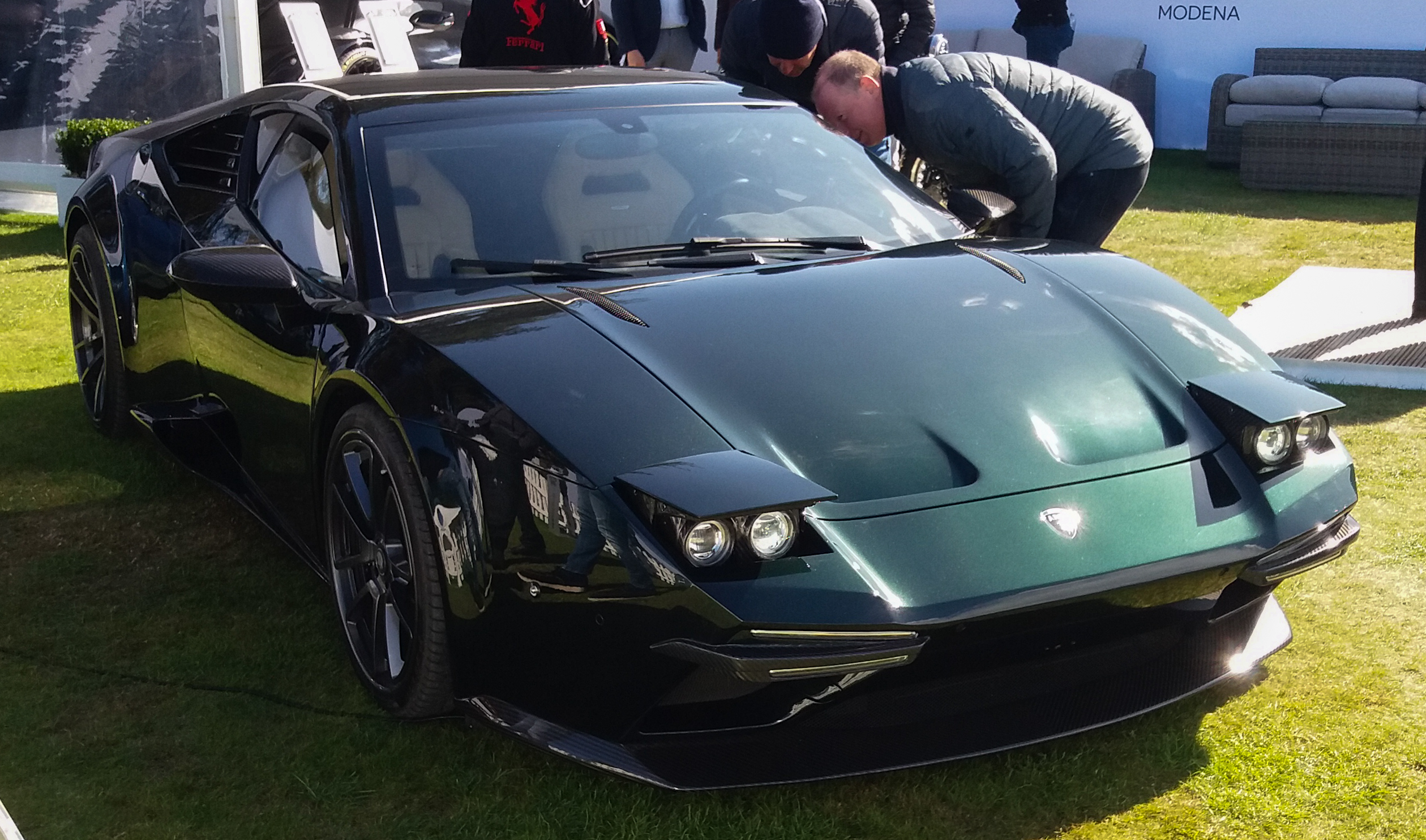
Ares Design Project1

Italian car manufacturer Ares Design introduced the Project1 in 2019 as a modern reinterpretation of the Pantera, based on the Lamborghini Huracán chassis.
