= Rayton-Fissore Magnum =

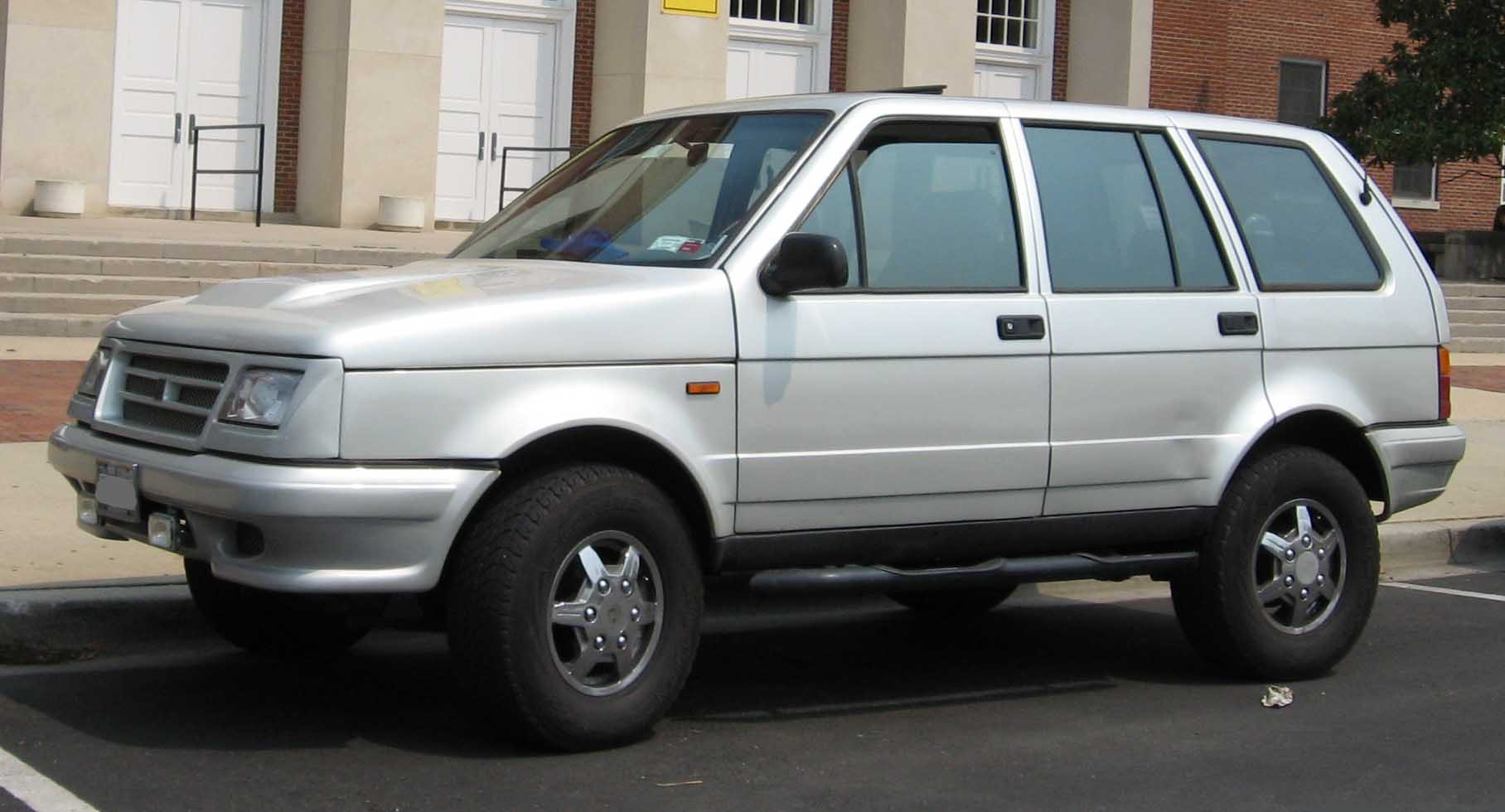

Overview
- Manufacturer: Rayton-Fissore / Laforza
- Also called: Laforza
- Production: 1985-1998 (Magnum); 1989-2003 (Laforza)
- Assembly: Italy: Cherasco; USA: Brighton, MI (Final assembly)
- Designer: Tom Tjaarda

Body and chassis
- Class: sport utility vehicle (SUV)
- Body style: 5-door SUV
- Layout: Front engine, four-wheel drive

Powertrain
- Engine: Petrol: 2.0 L Fiat/Lancia Abarth volumex S/C I4; 2.5 L Alfa Romeo V6; 3.4 L M30B35 I6; 5.0 L Ford 302 Windsor V8; 5.8 L 351W SEFI V8; 6.0 L Vortec 6000 V8; Diesel: 2.4 L VM81A TD I4; 2.5 L Sofim TD I4 2.5 L VM425 TD I4
- Transmission: 5-speed ZF/Iveco manual; 5-speed Peugeot BA 10/5 manual; 4-speed AOD/AODE automatic (Laforza)

Dimensions
- Length: 4,750 mm (187.0 in)

The Rayton-Fissore Magnum is an Italian-designed and built luxury off-roader, in small scale production between 1985 and 1998. The American V8-powered versions were marketed as Laforza and were built from 1989 until 2003.

The Magnum began life intended for military and police use, but the Tom Tjaarda designed car, fitted with an Italian leather interior in the spirit of the Maserati Biturbo, and a range of 4-, 6-, and 8-cylinder engines, was marketed as a "luxury 4x4." It was intended as a competitor for the Range Rover and designed to meet those needs the Range Rover left unfulfilled at the time, such as a more luxurious interior and more fuel-efficient smaller engines - including turbodiesels. Better fuel efficiency was essential to European market conditions.

The vehicle was refreshed in 1998 with a facelift to include more modern amenities, but still used the same basic body and drivetrain.

== Rayton-Fissore ==
The Rayton-Fissore Magnum 4x4 was presented in July, 1984. It is based on the shortened and lowered chassis of a projected medium-weight military off-roader called the Iveco "40 PM 10" (this project ended up being adopted as the Iveco VM 90). While the original Magnum prototype used the same turbodiesel engine as the Iveco Turbodaily, the 2,445 cc Sofim turbodiesel which ended up being installed in most of the Rayton-Fissore Magnums was projected from an early stage. The front and rear differentials, suspension, and brakes were carried over from the Iveco truck, which was based on the four-wheel drive version of the Iveco Daily.

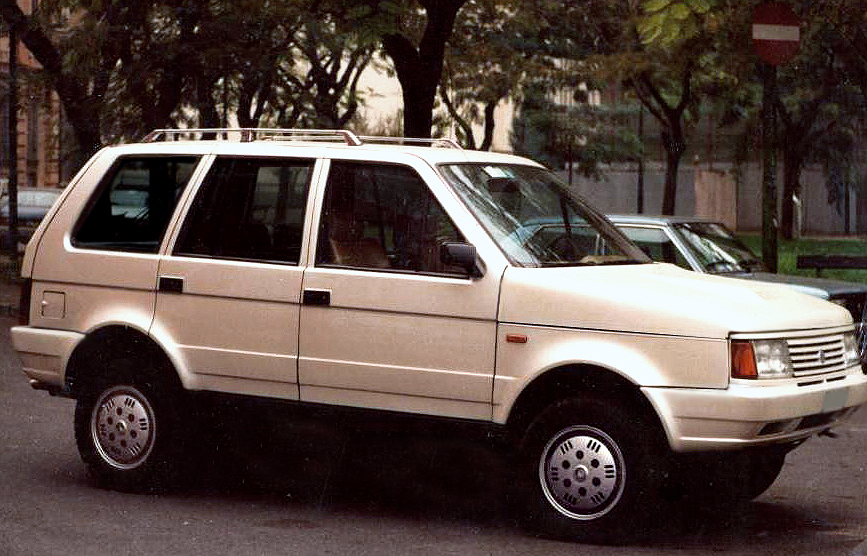
1986 Rayton-Fissore Magnum Turbo D

The steel body shell added additional strength to the chassis through a construction technique developed by Rayton Fissore called "UNIVIS." The body consisted of a square tubular structure bolted to the subframe with 10 rubber mounts (Silentbloc). Pre-series cars (built before March 1985) have fiberglass bodywork; the steel-bodied production cars retained the plastic bonnet and bootlid. Most of the Magnum bodies were built by Golden Car of Caramagna Piemonte and then sent to Rayton-Fissore in Cherasco to be finished. Many details such as the lamps came from Italian mass-market automobiles. The four-wheel-drive system was part-time with front and rear differentials, with the rear axle always being engaged. A BorgWarner transfer case provided a low set of gears for off-road use. The rear axle is a leaf-sprung live unit from the Iveco Daily. The standard power steering came from ZF.

About 6,000 Magnums were produced in 18 years of production, of which around 1,200 were the US-market Laforzas. Approximately 1,000 Magnums fitted with the VM turbodiesel were sold to various Italian law enforcement agencies up until the late nineties. Other institutional purchasers included Italy's Guardia di Finanza, the State Forestry Corps, and other, lesser entities. Rayton-Fissore did not have a strong enough sales network to properly market the car and also lacked the financial resources to update it.

=== Engines ===
The Magnum was originally available with three engine options, including two petrol engines and one diesel engine. The 2.4 liter (2393 cc) Sofim turbo diesel produces 90 to 110 PS (66 to 81 kW). The 2.0-litre four-cylinder supercharged petrol engine from Fiat/Lancia produces 138 PS (101 kW) and the 2.5-litre (2492 cc) Alfa Romeo sourced V6 produces 160 PS (118 kW), with the V6 being marketed as the Magnum VIP. Only about 120 of the V6-engined version were built.

With an updated version shown at the 1988 Turin Motor Show, the Fiat and Alfa Romeo engines were replaced with VM Motori turbodiesels and a BMW 3.4 liter inline-six as well as a BMW turbodiesel.

== Laforza ==
The first Laforza arrived in the United States in late 1989 with some modifications to the Magnum 4x4 base frame. The major differences included: reinforced and modified cross members and other details necessary to use the 4,942 cc (301.6 cu in) Ford V8 (more commonly known as the "5.0") EFI engine and the AOD transmission. This was coupled with Chrysler's "Selec-Trac" (2WD high, 4WD high, 4WD low) New Process 229 transfer case. The rolling chassis and its interior was finished by Pininfarina in Italy, while C&C in Brighton, MI installed the American-made mechanicals.

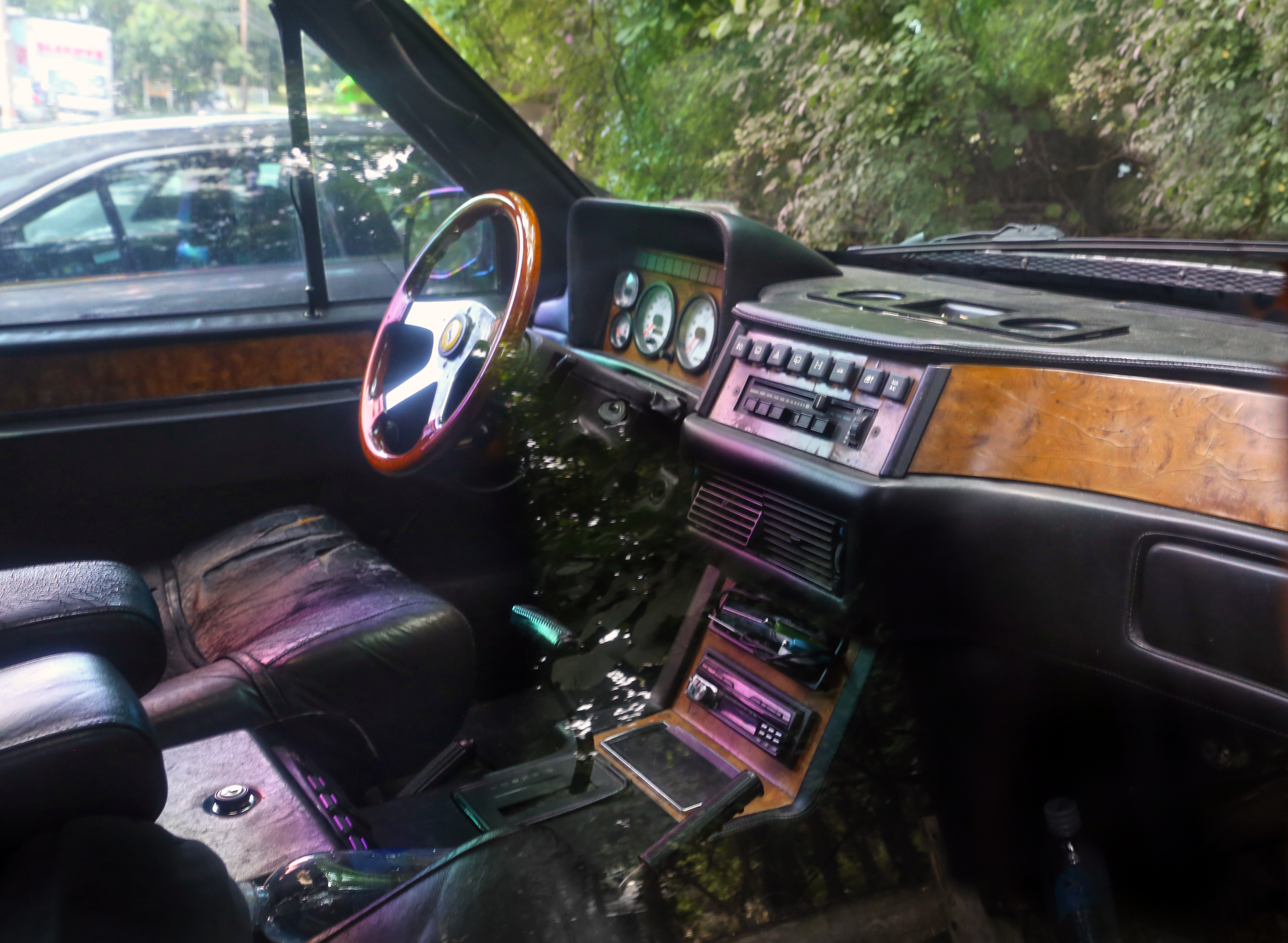
Laforza interior

The body underwent some minor restyling, bumpers and tail lights were different, as well as the headlights and grille. The Magnum 4x4's leather interior was retained in the American version, but upgraded with a new type of dash and seats as well as the center tunnel and the door panels.

=== 1989 to 1993 ===
The original Laforza 5-liter was updated by Pininfarina, who also did the final assembly. This model features a Ford 5.0 L EFI V8 (truck version) with automatic overdrive transmission (AOD) and a high/low gear transfer case (New Process model 229).

=== 1995 to 1998 ===
The Laforza GT was equipped with a Ford V8 5.0 L SEFI V8 (from the Mustang GT), with a few fitted with the 5.8 SEFI V8 (truck version) with the same transmission and transfer case as above. Some of these versions were fitted with an optional Kenne Bell supercharger. In 1996, production was transferred to Rayton-Fissore's successor company Magnum Industriale.

=== 1998 to 2003 ===
The company went through another restructuring in 1998, becoming "Laforza SpA." The updated Laforza Prima was fitted with the Ford V8 5.0 SEFI found on The Ford Explorer and an electronic automatic transmission (AODE) as well as a full-time 4WD transfer case (without low gears) with an Eaton Supercharger as optional. The Prima was renamed Laforza Magnum edition in 1999 when the Ford V8 model was joined by a General Motors 6.0-liter V8 with an Eaton supercharger and a 4-speed electronically controlled automatic transmission (Hydra-Matic 4L65-E) coupled with a 2wd/4wd high/4wd low transfer case was also offered. Laforza also planned a version for Europe, using a 3.9-liter 170 PS (125 kW; 168 hp) Iveco direct injection turbodiesel inline-four engine or Alfa Romeo's 3-liter V6, but this model remained a prototype. Golden Car owner Alessandro Festa acquired the rights to the Magnum/Laforza in 2004 but was unable to bring it back to the market.

== Gallery ==
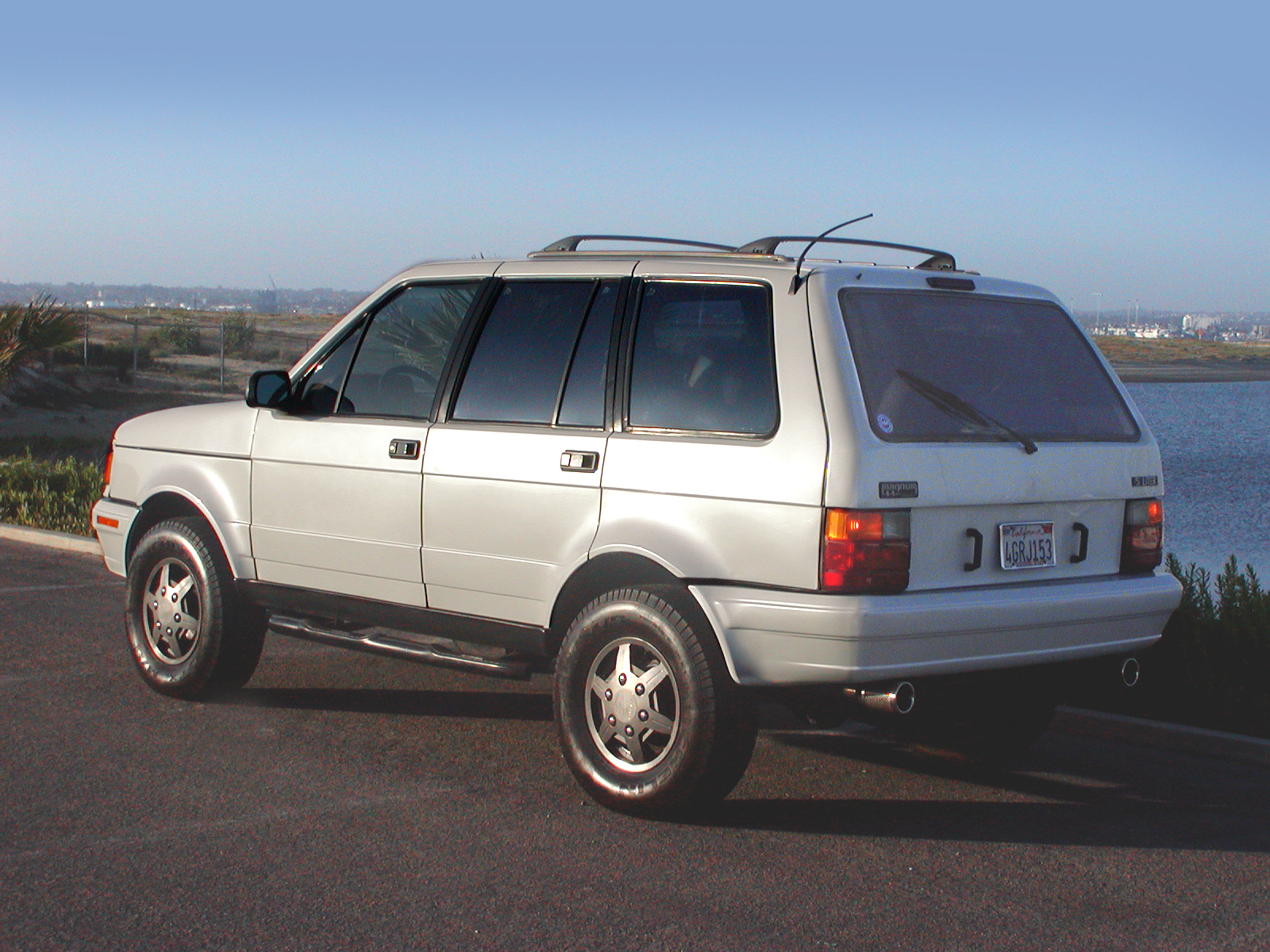
1989 Laforza 5.0 V8

1989 Laforza 5.0 V8 side view

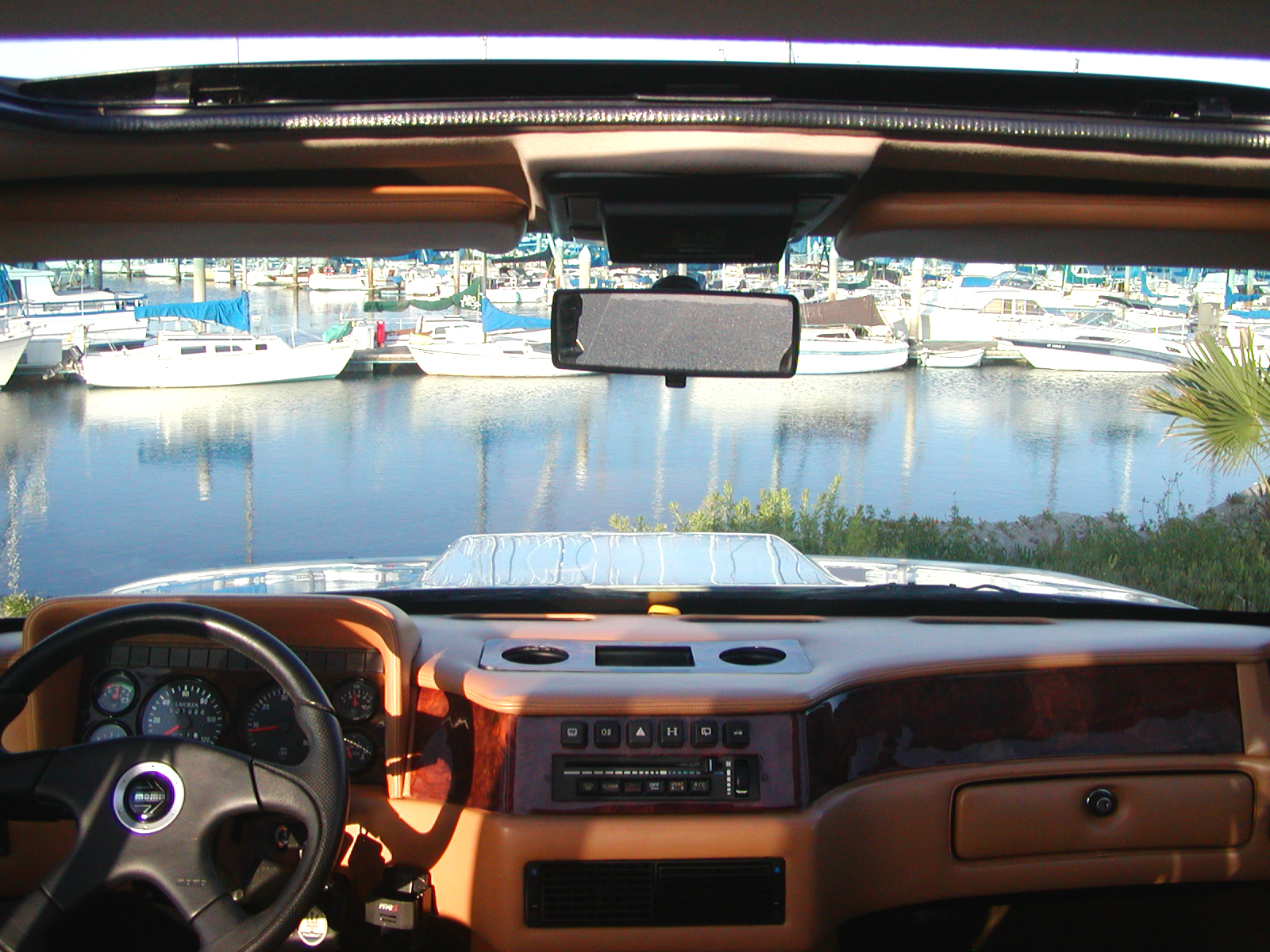
1989 Laforza 5.0 V8 interior

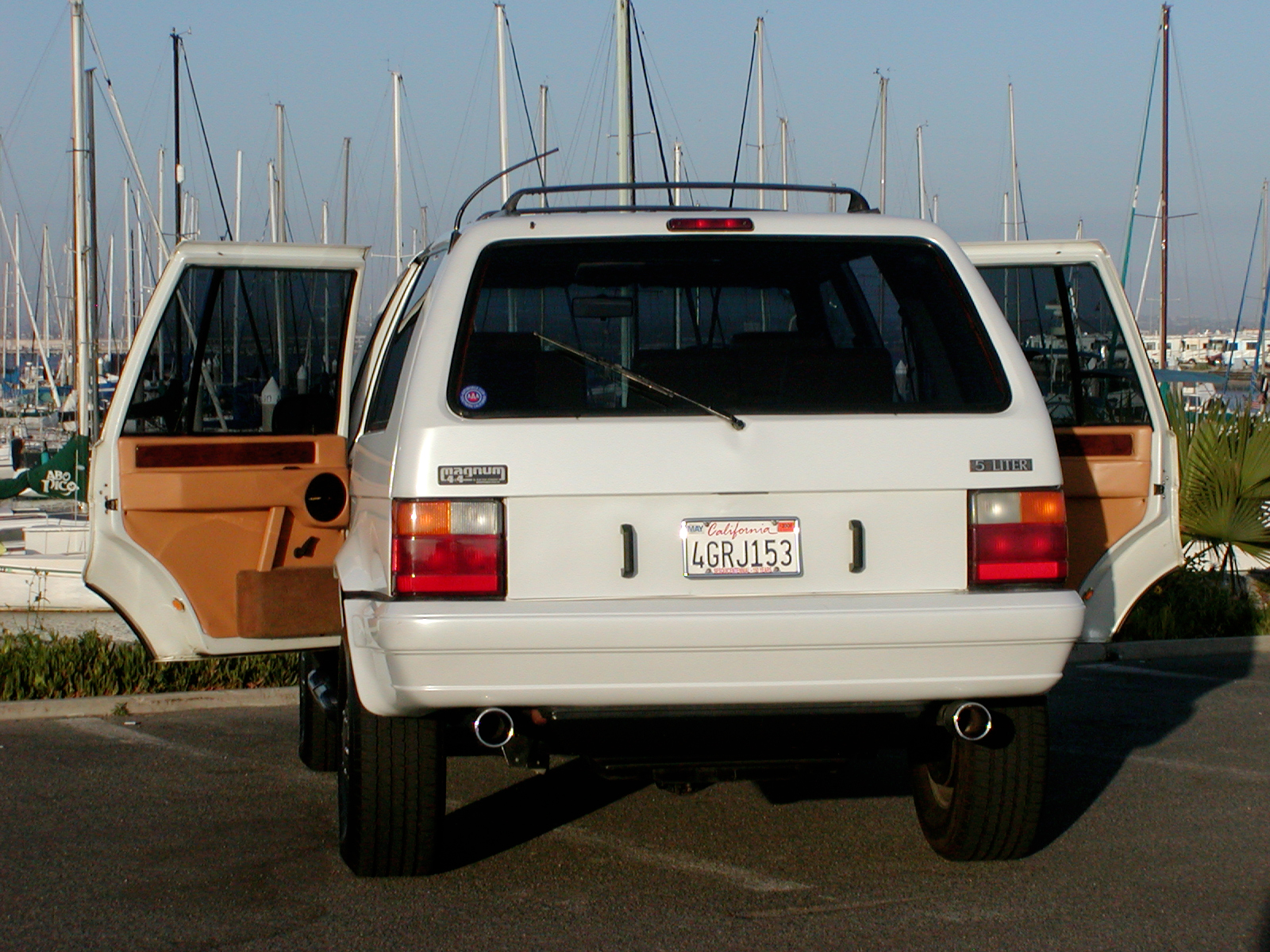
1989 Laforza 5.0 V8 rear view with doors open

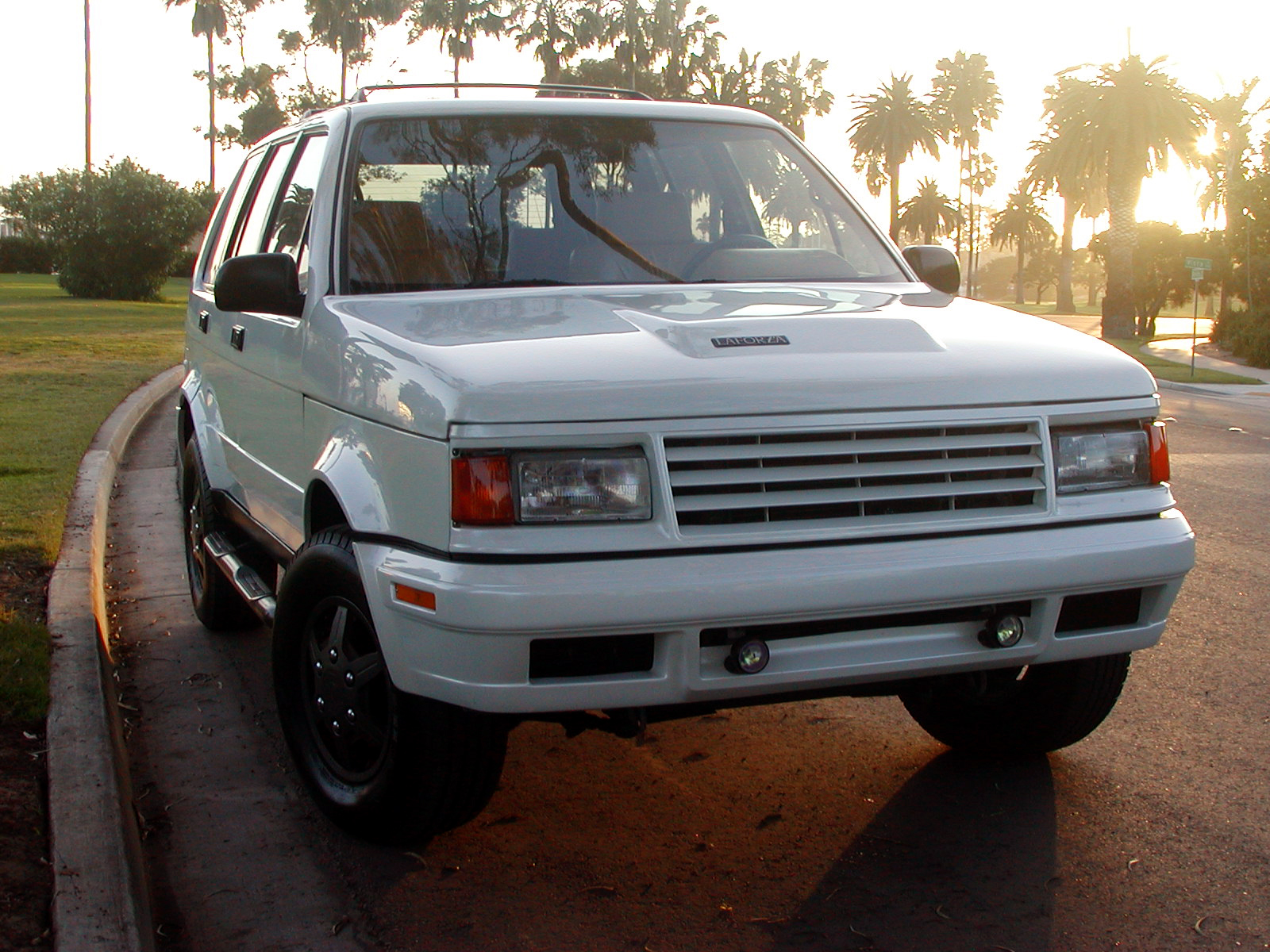
1989 Laforza 5.0 V8 front 3/4

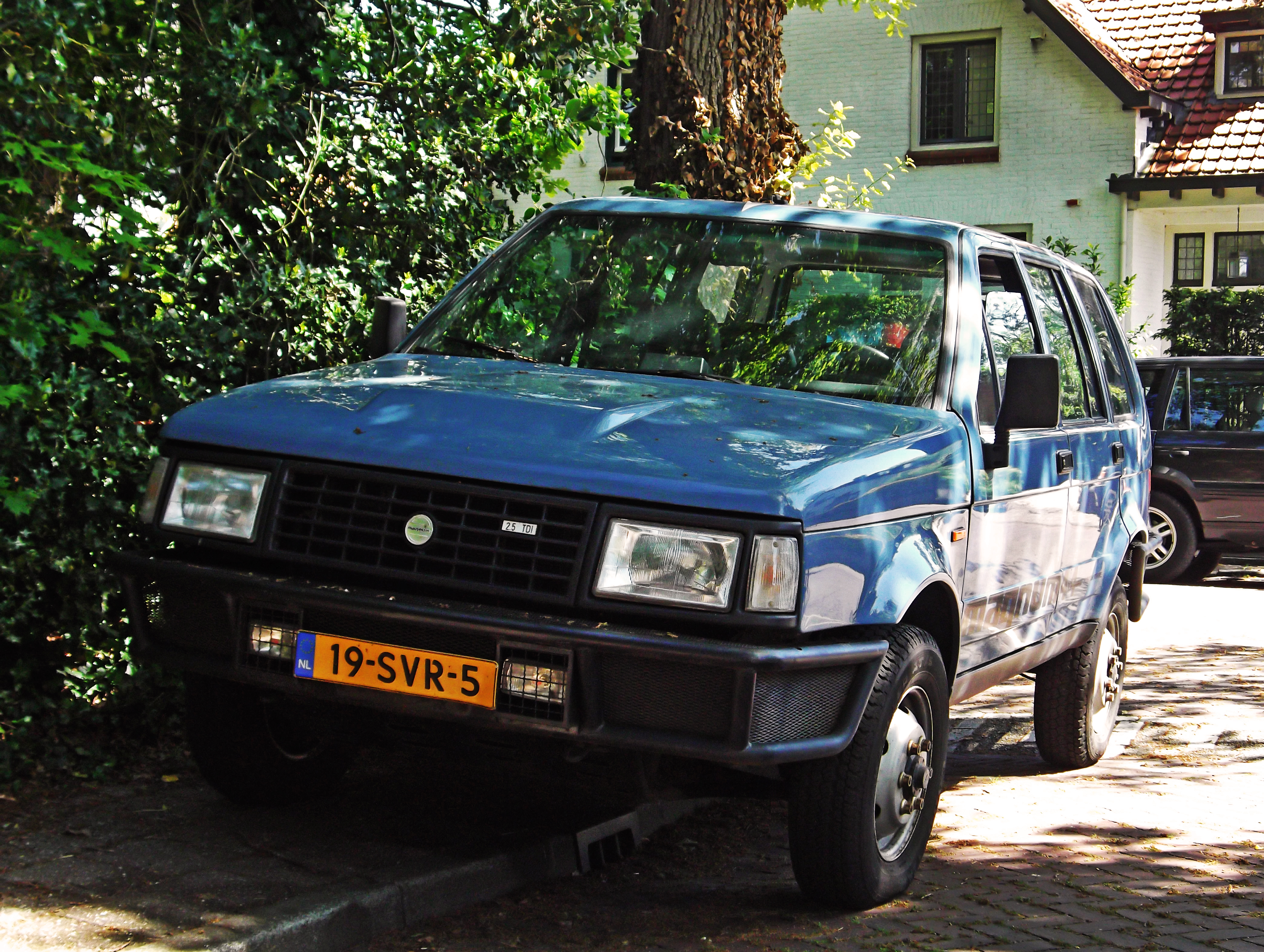
Late Rayton-Fissore Magnum 2.5 TDI with facelifted grille
