= Ghia Selene =

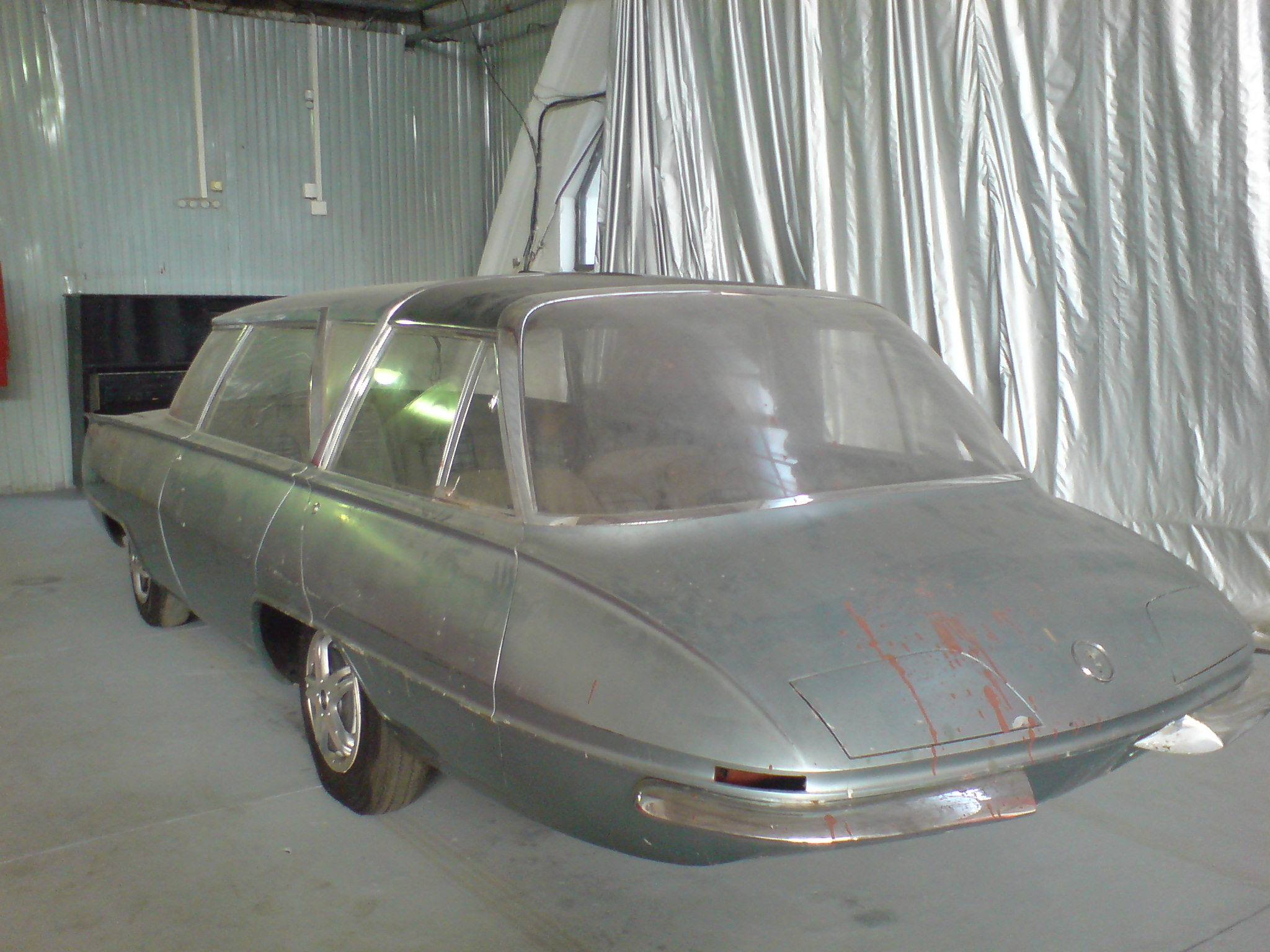
1959 Selene concept car

The Ghia Selene was a series of concept cars created by Carrozzeria Ghia.

== Selene I ==
The Selene I was designed by Tom Tjaarda. It was first shown at the Turin Motor Show in 1959 and had a lot of similarities with the Renault Project 900 concept, in that it had a cab forward design with a large rear area for the engine. This style would make the car look like the front was the rear and vice versa. The car could seat six people - two up front, and four in the back facing each other. No engine was fitted to this concept.

== Selene II ==
The Selene II was shown in 1962, also by Tom Tjaarda. It swapped the six person layout for five people - one up front in a central position, and four behind as with the Selene I. It retained the cab forward design. The styling followed the 1950s trend for fighter jet styling on cars. Ford would acquire Ghia in the 1970s. Wanting to raise some capital, the Selene II concept was sold off in 2002 for around $88,000.
