= Autobianchi Y10 =

Car manufactured from 1985 to 1996

Autobianchi Y10 / Lancia Y10
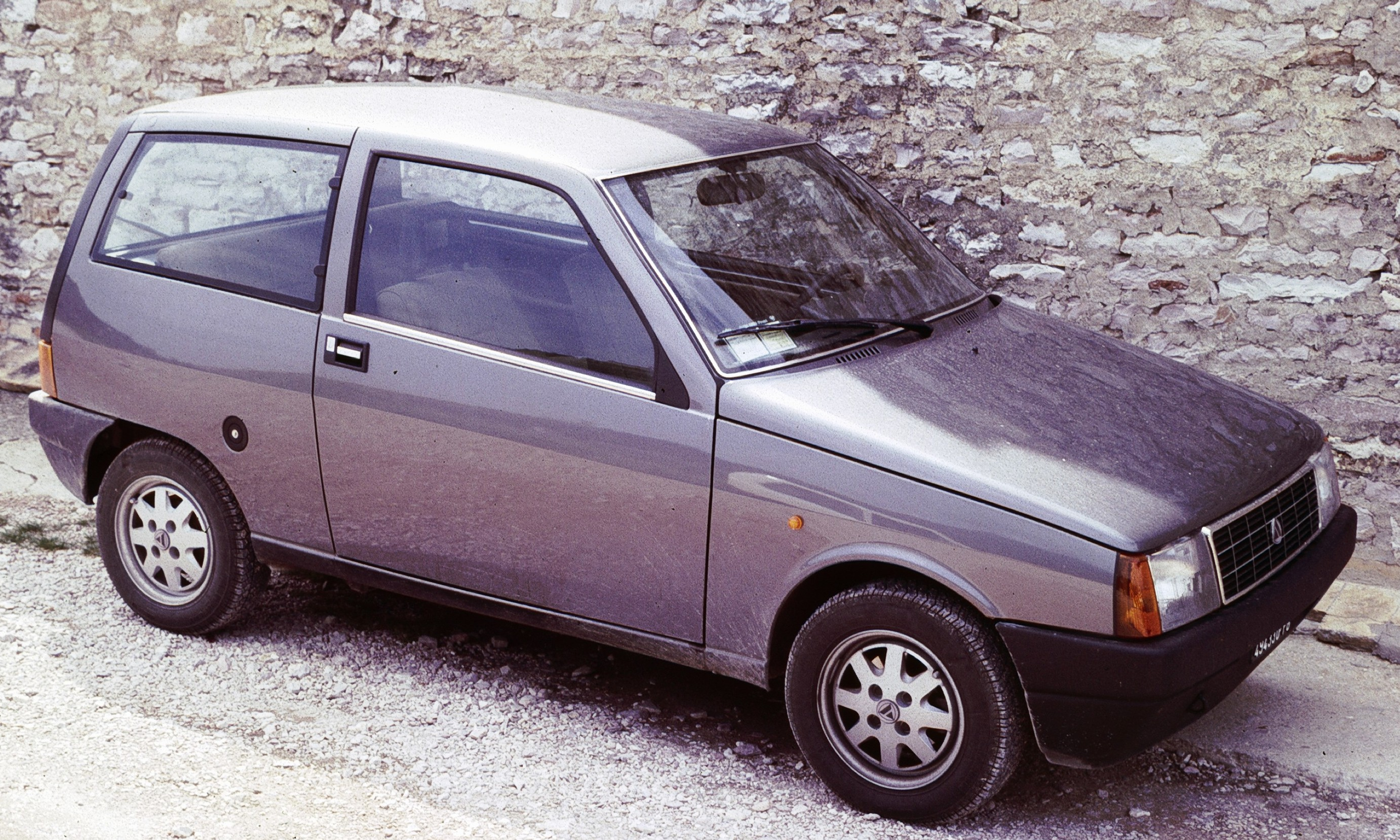
- Autobianchi Y10

Overview
- Manufacturer: Fiat Auto (1985–1986); Alfa-Lancia Industriale (1987–1991); Fiat Auto (1991–1996)
- Also called: Lancia Y10
- Production: 1985–1996
- Assembly: Italy: Desio (MI), Lombardy (1985–1992); Alfa Romeo Arese (MI) Plant, Lombardy (1992–1996); Alfa Romeo Pomigliano d'Arco (NA) plant, Campania (1987–1996); Mirafiori, Turin
- Designer: Antonio Piovano and Tom Tjaarda at Centro Stile Fiat

Body and chassis
- Class: Supermini (B)
- Body style: 3-door hatchback
- Layout: FF layout or 4WD
- Related: Fiat Panda

Powertrain
- Engine: 999 cc FIRE I4; 1049 cc 156A.000 I4; 1049 cc 156A1.000 turbo I4; 1108 cc FIRE I4; 1297 cc 146A5.046 I4; 1301 cc 156B.000 I4
- Transmission: 5-speed manual CVT automatic

Dimensions
- Wheelbase: 2,159 mm (85.0 in); 4WD: 2,171–2,178 mm (85.5–85.7 in)
- Length: 3,390 mm (133.5 in)
- Width: 1,510 mm (59.4 in)
- Height: 1,430 mm (56.3 in)
- Curb weight: 780 kg (1,720 lb)

Chronology
- Predecessor: Autobianchi A112
- Successor: Lancia Ypsilon

The Autobianchi Y10 is a supermini economy car manufactured from 1985 to 1996 and marketed as the Lancia Y10 in most export markets. It was built at Fiat's Autobianchi plant in Desio, Milan, until 1992, and subsequently in Arese and Pomigliano d'Arco, near Alfa Romeo's facilities. Despite its placement in the economy segment, the Y10 offered a relatively high level of standard equipment. It also introduced a new rear rigid axle suspension design (known as the Omega axle), which was later adopted by the facelifted Fiat Panda. With a drag coefficient of just 0.31, the Y10 achieved impressive aerodynamic efficiency for its compact dimensions.

The model sold reasonably well, with approximately 667,000 units produced in its first seven years, despite being positioned as a more expensive and niche-oriented alternative to its Fiat counterparts. Its success was aided by a combination of distinctive styling, upscale interior trim, and superior fuel economy resulting from its aerodynamics. Sales in the United Kingdom, however, were consistently weak, leading to its withdrawal from that market in late 1991, preceding Lancia's exit from Britain and all other right-hand-drive markets by more than two years. The brand continued in the supermini segment in left-hand-drive countries with the similarly positioned Ypsilon.

== History ==
The Autobianchi Y10 made its official debut at the Geneva Motor Show in March 1985, as a replacement for the fifteen-year-old A112. It was a runner-up for the 1986 European Car of the Year award, losing to the Ford Scorpio.

The A112 remained on sale alongside the Y10 almost to the end of 1986. The Y10 was marketed under the Autobianchi badge in Italy, France, Portugal, and Japan, and as a Lancia in most other markets. Lancia's British importer, Lancar Ltd., was concerned that the British motoring public would pronounce the name as "white hen" and considered renaming it. When the Y10 name had been settled on, Lancar declined to use the Autobianchi brand. After discussions with Lancia headquarters, it was agreed that the car was to be marketed as the Lancia Y10 in the United Kingdom. In Portugal and in France, the Y10 retained Autobianchi badging until 1989, after which it was rebadged as a Lancia.

=== Design ===
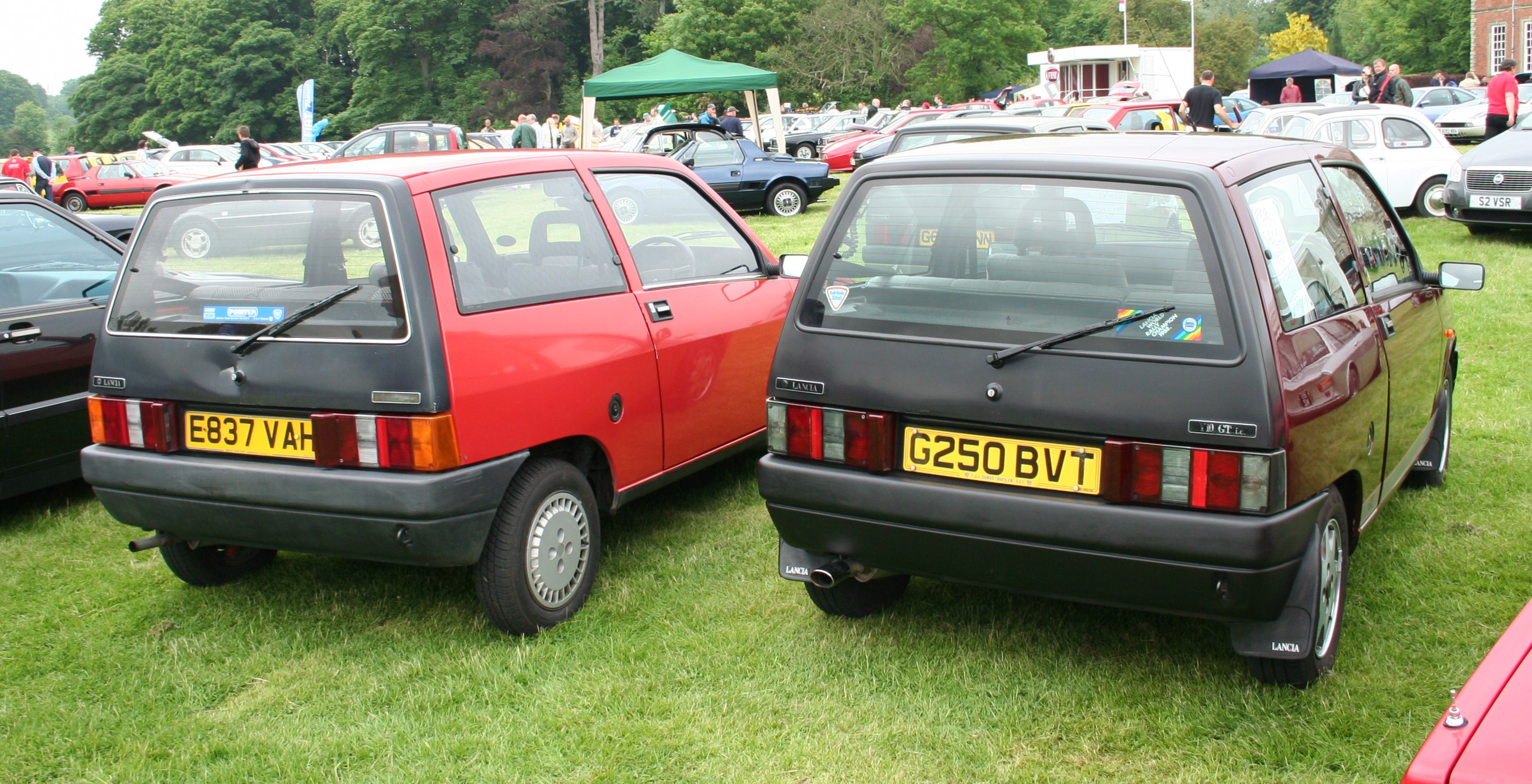
Rear end of Y10 with black tailgate

The Y10's most distinctive design feature was its truncated rear end, with a vertically cut-off tailgate finished in matte black regardless of body colour. The car's pronounced wedge-shaped profile contributed to its excellent aerodynamics (Cd=0.31), aided by a sloping bonnet that flowed into the raked windscreen, flush-mounted side glass, recessed door handles, the absence of roof gutters, and a roofline that tapered gently towards the rear.

These innovations were rare in a small car at the time and were developed by the Fiat Centro Stile, which was then under the direction of Vittorio Ghidella.(it) The Y10 project took over three years to complete, with the goal of creating a model that clearly aligned with Lancia's premium image. Initial design proposals were commissioned from Pininfarina, Giorgetto Giugiaro, and the in-house Fiat Centro Stile. Hundreds of sketches and scale models were produced from as early as 1980, but the final in-house design was chosen as the best fit for the targeted "select and elite" clientele, positioning the Y10 accordingly.

The exterior featured rectangular headlights and a simple grille. The large, steeply raked windscreen was bonded with silicone resin rather than a traditional rubber gasket and serviced by a single wiper. The side profile was defined by a beltline that rose gradually from the bonnet towards the lower edge of the tailgate, framed by wrap-around taillights.

The Y10 was available only as a three-door hatchback, with relatively large doors that provided easy access to the rear seats. The near-vertical tailgate was hinged higher on the roof — its pivot point shifted 11 cm (4.3 in) inward for improved luggage compartment access. The horizontal rear light clusters echoed those of the A112, integrated into a wrap-around bumper.

Mechanically, the car shared its underpinnings with the Fiat Panda, meaning a conventional transverse-engine layout with front-wheel drive (or optional four-wheel drive). The fuel capacity, at 47 L (10.3 imp gal; 12.4 US gal), was at least fifty percent larger than typical for the class.

=== Interior ===
The interior was fully carpeted and featured cloth-upholstered seats. Higher trim levels offered optional Alcantara trim on the dashboard, seats, and door panels. Available options included electric windows, central locking, a split-folding rear bench seat, power-operated rear windows, a glass sunroof, and an advanced climate control system with electronic controls and an LED display similar to the unit introduced on the Fiat Regata.

== First series (1985–1988) ==
Despite strong interest by the international Press and public at the Geneva Motor Show, initial sales were disappointing. Few buyers were willing to pay the Y10's premium asking price. In 1985, Autobianchi-Lancia produced 63,495 examples—fewer than the 88,292 units of the outgoing A112 built the previous year. In response, the range was restructured: a more affordable entry-level Y10 Fire model was introduced, while higher trims received additional standard equipment. According to an official press release issued at launch, trim level names were styled in lowercase (e.g., "Y10 fire", "touring", and "turbo").

Most versions were equipped with a five-speed manual transmission, a transversely mounted front engine, and front-wheel drive (with four-wheel drive optional on select models from 1986). The suspension consisted of MacPherson struts at the front and a rigid "Omega" axle at the rear.

=== 1985 ===
The Y10 Fire was powered by the new 999 cc (61 cu in) four-cylinder (Fully Integrated Robotised Engine), which produced 45 hp (33 kW) at 5,000 rpm and 80 N⋅m (59 lb⋅ft) of torque at 2,750 rpm. Despite its modest output, the engine offered low fuel consumption and reduced noise levels. It enabled a top speed in excess of 145 km/h (90 mph) and acceleration from 0 to 100 km/h (0 to 62 mph) in 16 seconds.

The Y10 Touring was powered by a 1,049 cc (64 cu in) four-cylinder engine built in Brazil to the FIASA design. Originally developed by Aurelio Lampredi for models such as the Fiat 147 and 127 (and later used in the Brazilian Fiat Uno), it produced 56 hp (41 kW) at 5,850 rpm and 81 N⋅m (60 lb⋅ft) of torque at 2,850 rpm. Externally identical to the Y10 Fire except for trunk badging, the Touring featured Alcantara upholstery in place of cloth on the seats and door panels. It achieved a top speed of 155 km/h (96 mph) and accelerated from 0 to 100 km/h (0 to 62 mph) in 14.5 seconds.

The Y10 Turbo used the same 1,049 cc (64 cu in) Brazilian-built FIASA engine as the Touring, but fitted with an IHI turbocharger and intercooler. It produced 84 hp (62 kW) at 5,750 rpm and 123 N⋅m (90 lb⋅ft) of torque at 2,750 rpm. Compared with the naturally aspirated version, it featured sodium-filled exhaust valves, an electric fuel pump, and Magneti Marelli Digiplex electronic ignition. The turbocharging system incorporated an intercooler, bypass valve, and thermostatic valve — elements inspired by contemporary Formula 1 technology. It achieved a top speed of 180 km/h (112 mph) and accelerated from 0 to 100 km/h (0 to 62 mph) in 9.5 seconds. Externally, the Turbo was distinguished by red accent stripes on the bumpers, a "Turbo" decal along the lower sides, enlarged front and rear bumpers (to house the intercooler and a unique transverse exhaust muffler with polished tailpipe), and distinctive alloy wheels—some early examples using metric 340 mm (13.4 in) rims. The interior was quieter than other variants and featured sportier seats with different upholstery, revised trim, and additional analogue instruments, including a boost pressure gauge.

=== 1986 ===
In 1986, the range was expanded with new versions, some of which were positioned at lower price points. The line-up now comprised the Fire, Fire LX, Touring, and Turbo. All models featured a height-adjustable steering wheel as standard or optional equipment. Sales began to improve significantly during the year. Late in 1986, a four-wheel-drive variant was introduced. Total production across all models reached 80,403 units that year.

The updated entry-level Y10 Fire was positioned at a significantly lower price point — approximately one million lire less than it cost at launch. It was externally distinguishable by a matte black grille surround and black grille (replacing the polished stainless steel frame and silver grille of the 1985 version). The taillight clusters were simplified and asymmetrical, with only one reversing light on the right and one rear fog light on the left. The interior featured cloth upholstery, a revised dashboard design, and open storage compartments in place of lidded gloveboxes.

The Y10 Fire LX, introduced as an intermediate trim level between the base Fire and the Touring, it was essentially a carryover of the original 1985 Fire specification. It offered a more upscale appearance than the simplified 1986 Fire, featuring lidded glove compartments and Alcantara upholstery on the seats and door panels. Standard equipment included electric windows, central locking, and an overhead digital clock with integrated reading light (supplied by Veglia Borletti).

The Y10 Touring retained its original pricing, but gained additional standard equipment, including electric front windows, central locking, and the overhead digital clock with integrated reading light. Mechanically unchanged, it continued to use the naturally aspirated 1,049 cc (64 cu in) Brazilian-built FIASA four-cylinder engine.

The Y10 Turbo, like the Touring, gained additional standard equipment in 1986, including electric front windows, central locking, and the overhead digital clock with integrated reading light. Interior quality was further improved with higher-grade plastics and better assembly. Select examples were equipped with electric rear windows, the electronic climate control system, and full Alcantara upholstery.

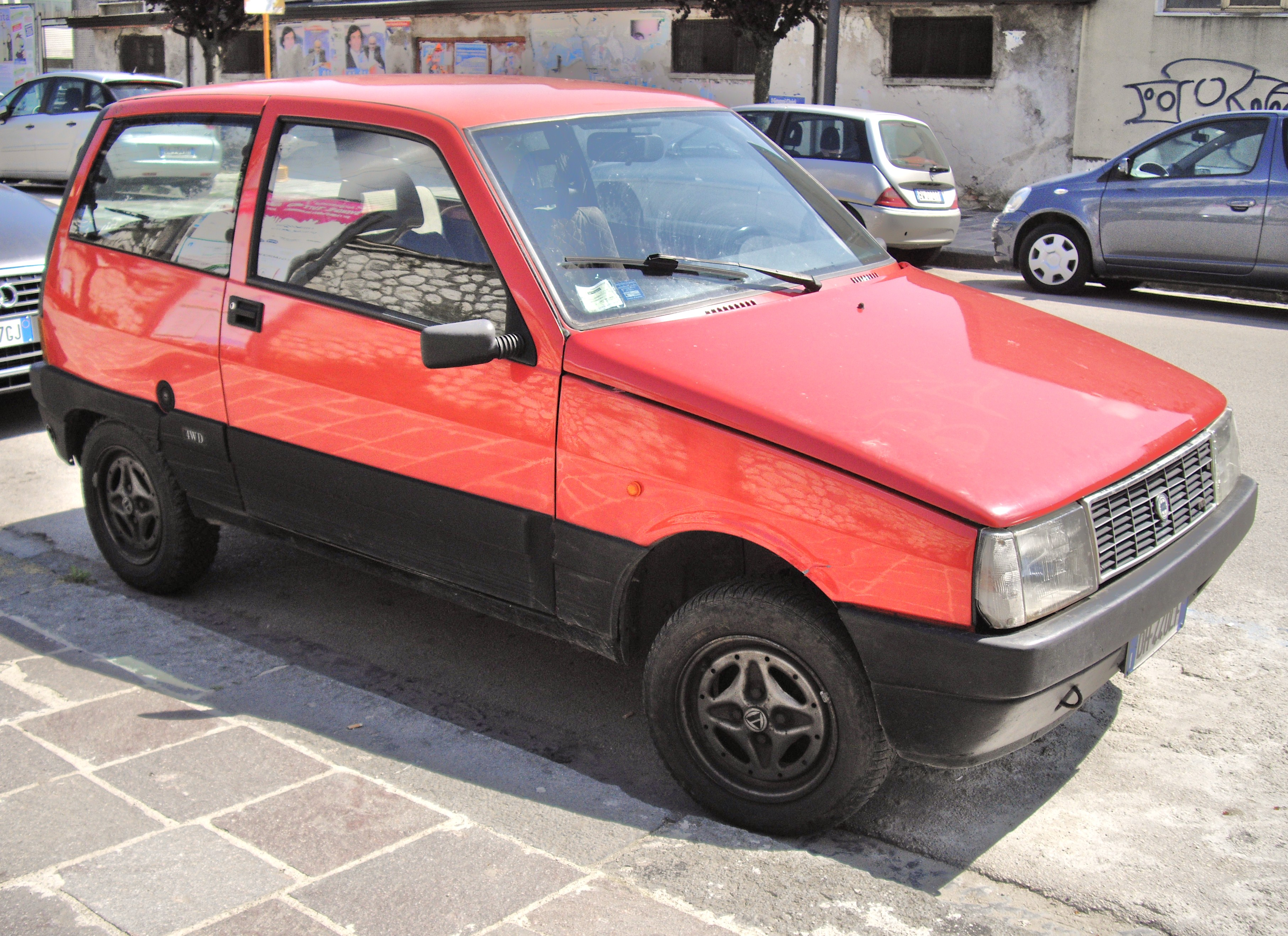
Lancia Y10 4WD

The Y10 4WD, introduced in late October 1986, brought four-wheel drive to the range. It used a part-time all-wheel-drive system derived from the Fiat Panda 4x4 (developed in collaboration with Steyr). It was powered by a tuned version of the 999 cc (61 cu in) FIRE engine, producing 50 hp (37 kW) at 5,500 rpm. The 4WD model had a slightly longer wheelbase than front-wheel-drive variants – initially extended by 12 mm (0.47 in), later increased to 19 mm (0.75 in). Its design, premium finishes, and mechanical sophistication allowed it to occupy a market space broadly comparable to that of modern subcompact SUVs, albeit in a smaller package. Its selectable all-wheel-drive system was operated by a dashboard button. An electro-pneumatic mechanism engaged the rear axle only when needed: engagement was possible with the engine running and the vehicle stationary or travelling below 55 km/h (34 mph). Above this speed, the system would only activate once the vehicle slowed below the threshold. To prevent ice, mud, or snow from obstructing the actuators, four-wheel drive was automatically engaged whenever the engine was switched off. Externally, the 4WD was easily identifiable by wide protective plastic side mouldings, unique wheel designs without hubcaps, front and rear mud flaps, and "4WD" badging on the tailgate, side shields, and flaps. The interior featured a new padded steering wheel. Standard equipment was generous and included a right-hand door mirror, tachometer, sunroof, electric windows, central locking, split-folding rear seat, and height-adjustable steering wheel. A headlamp washer system was optional. Performance figures included a top speed of 145 km/h (90 mph) and 100 km/h (62 mph) acceleration in 17.4 seconds. The four-wheel-drive hardware necessitated a smaller fuel tank of 35 L (7.7 imp gal; 9.2 US gal).

=== 1987–1988 ===
During 1987–1988, the Y10 matured into a well-established product with a clear premium positioning in the supermini segment, appealing to a diverse clientele seeking style and exclusivity in a compact package. Having overcome its slow start, the model now enjoyed strong commercial success. This period also saw the introduction of several limited "special series" editions that ran alongside the standard versions; these versions were often developed in collaboration with fashion and lifestyle brands and featured unique styling, trim, and details unavailable on standard models, and helped reinforce the Y10's image as a fashionable choice and pioneered a marketing approach that would later become commonplace across the industry.In 1987 alone, 109,708 examples were produced, bringing the cumulative total since launch to approximately 254,000 units.

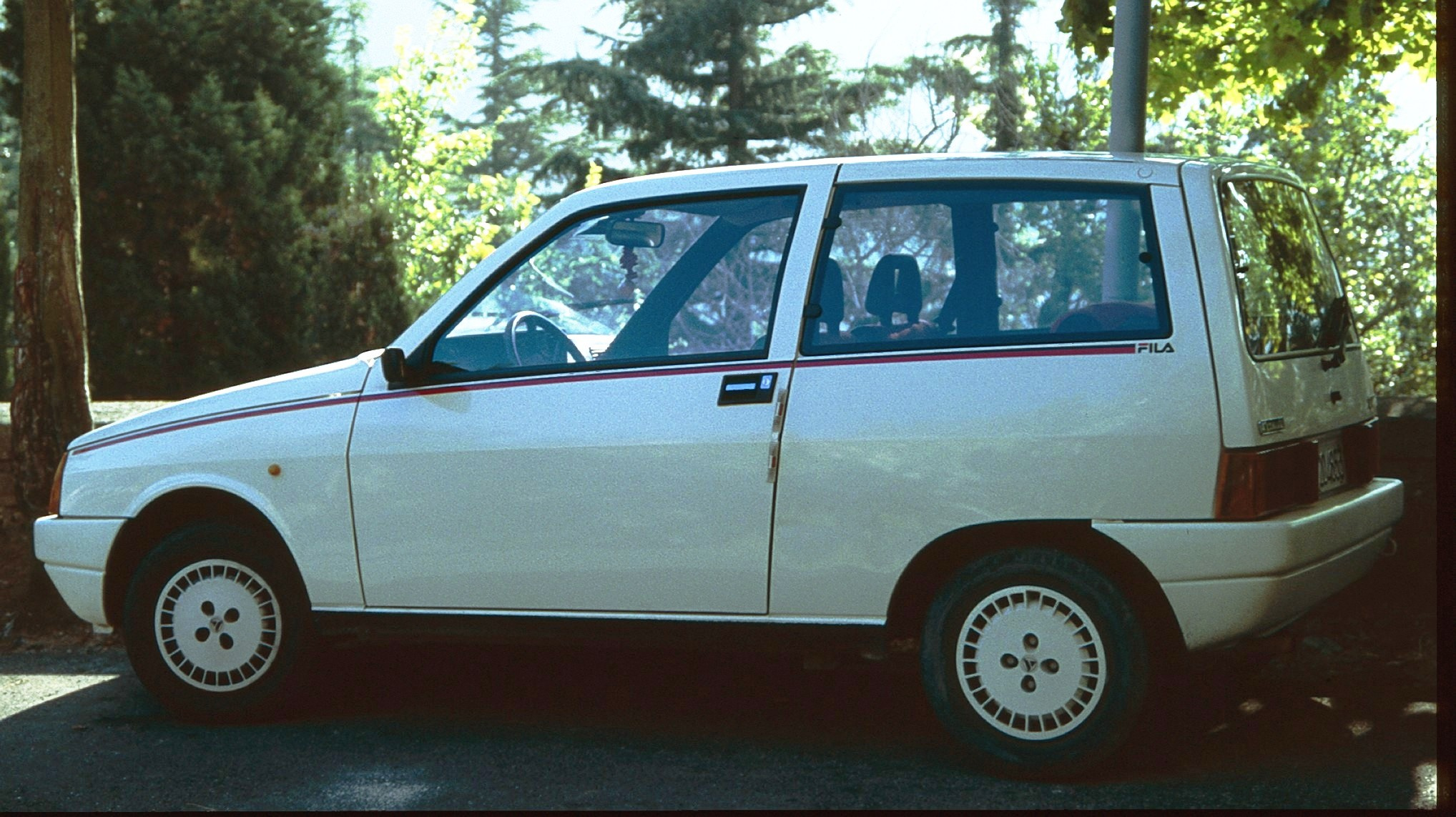
Autobianchi Y10 Fila

The Y10 Fila was the first of these special editions, and was launched in February 1987 in collaboration with the renowned Biella-based sportswear brand Fila. Targeted at young and dynamic buyers, it was mechanically based on the 1986 Y10 Fire and retained the same standard equipment. Externally, it stood out with an all-white finish that extended to the body, tailgate, bumpers, grille surround, and wheel covers. Monotony was broken by adhesive side stripes in black and blue (or alternatively black and red) that ran along the beltline and incorporated the Fila logo near the doors. The interior featured matching blue (or red) cloth upholstery on the seats and door panels, with the Fila logo embroidered on the front seatbacks. The edition's strong success prompted a follow-up version, the Fila 2, which reversed the colour scheme: the body was painted black, while the bumpers, grille, and wheel covers remained in contrasting finishes. White-and-red side stripes adorned the body sides, complemented by corresponding white-and-red interior fabric.

The Y10 Martini, launched in June 1987, a few months after the Fila edition, celebrated Lancia's long-standing motorsport partnership with Martini & Rossi, famous for its backing of Lancia's rallying successes, particularly with the Lancia Delta. Based on the Y10 Turbo, it was offered exclusively in white. The wheel covers were also white (with optional alloy wheels available), while the enlarged wrap-around bumpers were left in unpainted grey plastic. Distinctive Martini Racing stripes in the brand's iconic colours ran along the sides, and the same motif was used for the seat fabric and door panels.

The Y10 Missoni was launched in October 1987 in collaboration with renowned Italian fashion designer Ottavio Missoni, who personally appeared in television advertisements alongside the car. It was based on the Fire LX and featured a distinctive "Memphis Blue" body colour, contrasted by the standard matte black tailgate. The same shade of blue was used for the interior carpets and fabric inserts. The dashboard and door panels were trimmed in hazelnut brown Alcantara, while the seats incorporated velvet stripes in Missoni's signature "Missonato" pattern, coordinated with the exterior hue. It was identified by the Missoni logo. which was applied to the rear section of the side panels, positioned midway between the beltline rub strip and the rear window.

== Second series (1989–1992) ==
In February 1989, the facelifted second-series Y10 was unveiled, featuring subtle exterior updates, interior revisions, and engine changes.

Externally, all models, received new wheel trims (with the exception of the 4WD), clear front indicators, and redesigned symmetrical taillight clusters, which were now uniform across the range. The new rear lights incorporated dual smoked reversing lamps, twin red fog lamps, dual-filament brake lights, side marker lights, and smoked indicator lenses.

The base Fire received a revised radiator grille with a stainless steel surround but a single-colour (non-chromed) insert. Interior changes included a more upright rear seatback with less padding to increase luggage capacity, redesigned door panels with integrated speaker grilles and electric window switches at the bottom of the front doors (electric windows optional on the Fire), and new upholstery fabrics. The dashboard on the Fire retained its open storage compartments.

All versions featured updated instrument graphics and, with the exception of the base Fire, a height-adjustable steering wheel as standard. The heating and ventilation system gained a manual recirculation function as standard; an optional new digital climate control system offered electronic temperature regulation, a display, and an "auto" mode for maintaining a constant cabin temperature, but true air conditioning was still not offered — not even as an option.

The previous lineup — including Fire, Fire LX, Touring, Turbo, and special editions — was rationalised. Only the base Fire remained mechanically unchanged; all other variants were discontinued along with the 999 cc (61 cu in) engine. This was replaced across the range by the new 1,108 cc (68 cu in) FIRE unit with single-point electronic fuel injection (first seen on the 1988 Fiat Tipo). It developed 56 hp (41 kW) at 5,500 rpm and 88 N⋅m (65 lb⋅ft) of torque at 3,000 rpm. The mid-trim Fire LX i.e. achieved a top speed of 156 km/h (97 mph) and accelerated from 0 to 100 km/h (0 to 62 mph) in 13.9 seconds.

The Y10 was withdrawn from the British market at the end of 1991 amid declining Lancia sales exacerbated by the early 1990s economic recession. Lancia's complete withdrawal from the UK and all other right-hand-drive markets followed just over two years later.

=== 1989 ===
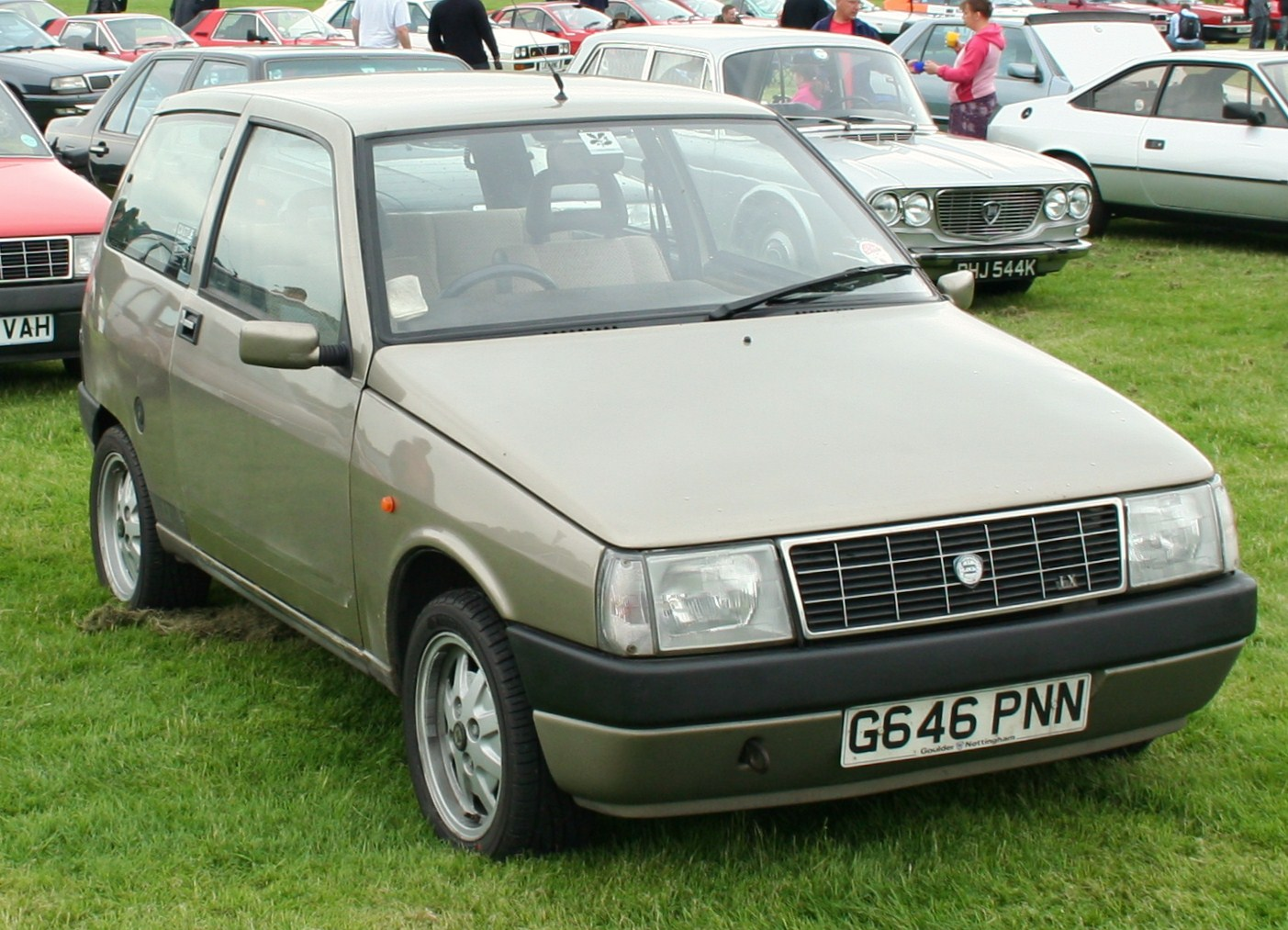
Lancia Y10 Fire LX i.e.

The facelifted Y10 Fire LX i.e. was externally distinguished by a lower bumper section painted in body colour, a side rubbing strip with identification badge running along the lower door edges, and a chrome exhaust tip. Inside, it featured standard Alcantara trim on the dashboard and door panels, with cloth-upholstered seats as standard or optional full Alcantara upholstery. In December 1989, a variant with continuously variable transmission was introduced on the Fire LX i.e., badged as Selectronic. It used an electronically controlled CVT (ECVT) developed by Fuji Heavy Industries. It was the same unit as the one fitted to the Subaru Justy, paired with the 1,108 cc (68 cu in) FIRE engine equipped with single-point electronic fuel injection. Unlike hydraulic automatic transmissions such as the Fiat Uno Selecta, the Y10's system employed an electromagnetic clutch. Performance included a top speed of 150 km/h (93 mph) and 0–100 km/h (62 mph) acceleration in 15.0 seconds.

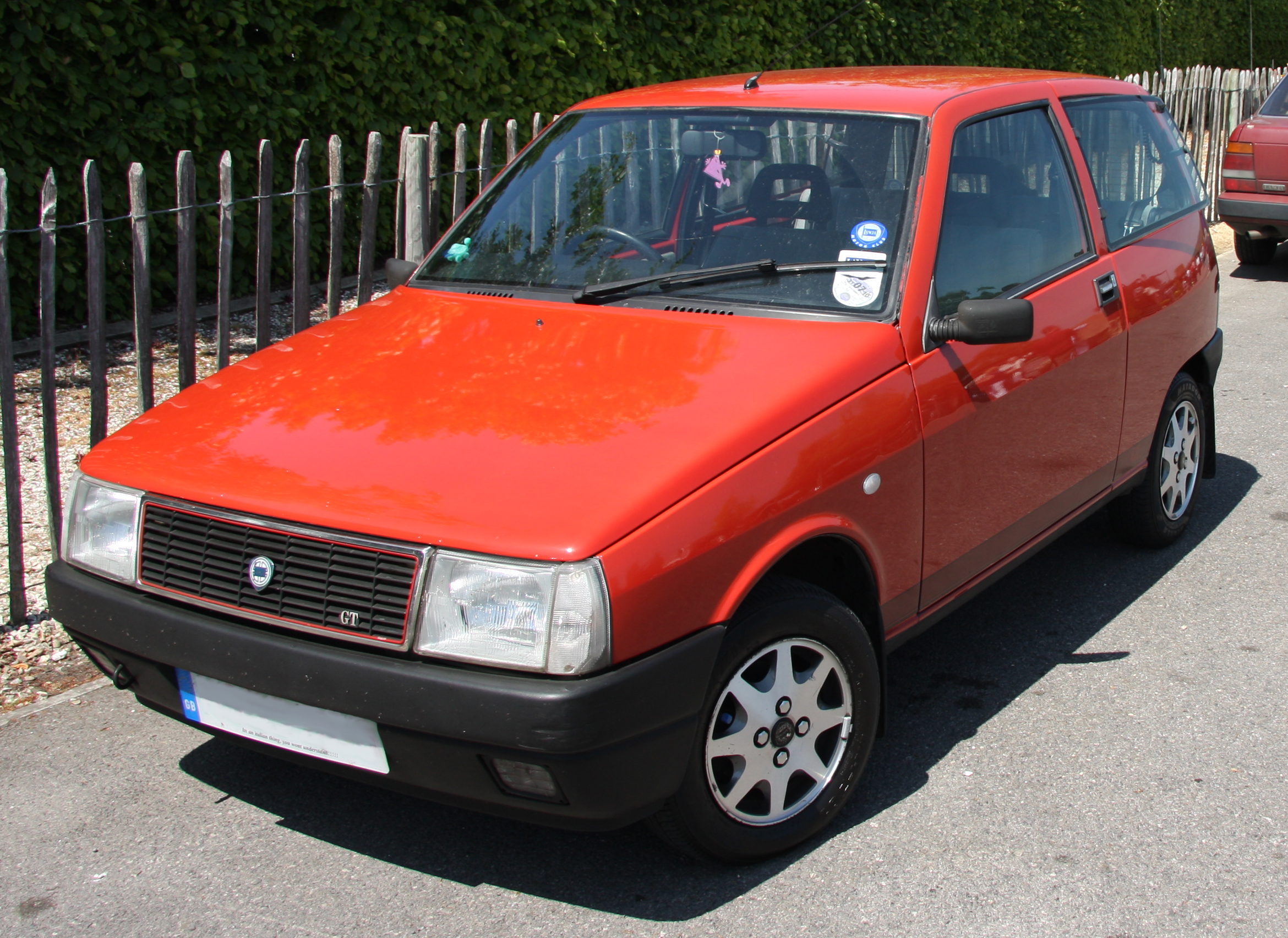
Lancia Y10 GT in UK

The Y10 GT i.e. superseded the Turbo, due to more stringent emissions regulations in markets such as Switzerland, Austria, and Germany, which forced the discontinuation of the 1,049 cc (64 cu in). The GT i.e. featured a new Brazilian-built 1,301 cc (79 cu in) engine – although the catalyzed version displaces 1,297 cc (79 cu in). The GT's engine was equipped with Bosch LE-Jetronic multi-point electronic fuel injection and derived from the earlier 1,049 cc unit. It developed 78 hp DIN (57 kW) at 5,750 rpm and 100 N⋅m (74 lb⋅ft) of torque at 3,250 rpm. The GT i.e. achieved a top speed of 178 km/h (111 mph) and accelerated from 0 to 100 km/h (0 to 62 mph) in 11.5 seconds. Compared with the outgoing Turbo, it offered a smoother, quieter, and more refined driving experience, making it a more versatile all-rounder despite the slight reduction in outright performance. Externally, the GT i.e. was identified by a red strip accent on the inside of the front grille frame, a lower side rubbing strip with identification badge, distinctive wheel trims (with optional alloy wheels), and a chrome exhaust tip. The interior featured a comprehensive, sport-oriented instrument cluster similar to that of the previous Turbo.

The Y10 4WD i.e. was updated with the new 1108 cc FIRE single-point fuel-injected engine, as used in the Fire LX i.e. The selectable all-wheel-drive system remained unchanged. Performance improved to a top speed of 151 km/h (94 mph) and 0 to 100 km/h (0 to 62 mph) acceleration in 15 seconds. Externally, the 4WD i.e. was identical to its predecessor, retaining the wide protective side mouldings, mud flaps, unique wheels without hubcaps, and "4WD" badging.

=== 1990–1992 ===
In March 1990, Lancia introduced catalysed versions of the Y10 range to comply with impending stricter European emissions standards. For each existing trim level (except the base Fire, which retained its carburettor to preserve its position as the affordable, best-selling entry model in Italy), a corresponding model equipped with a catalytic converter and electronic fuel injection was added. These new variants were typically badged with the "i.e. cat." suffix (or simply "i.e." in some markets) and used the 1,108 cc (68 cu in) FIRE engine tuned for reduced emissions, with only minor power losses compared to the non-catalysed units. The introduction of catalysed models marked the beginning of the Y10's final phase, as the range gradually shifted toward cleaner technology while maintaining its premium positioning in the supermini segment.

The Y10 Mia, introduced in 1991, offered extensive personalisation options, allowing buyers to choose from four Alcantara colour schemes for the dashboard, door panels, and upholstery: ice (light grey), camel beige, turquoise, or carmine red. This high degree of customisation proved extremely popular, with the Mia accounting for nearly 40% of total Y10 production in 1991–1992.

The Y10 Ego, launched in September 1991 and based on the Fire LX i.e., was available exclusively in Black Mica paint, with the tailgate painted to match. The interior was fully trimmed in premium "Bulgarian Red" leather supplied by Poltrona Frau, extending to the dashboard, steering wheel, gear lever, door panels, and seats. Additional features included perforated front headrests and upgraded tyres.

The Y10 Avenue, released in early 1992 and capitalising on the success of the Mia, the Avenue featured a body-coloured tailgate in place of the standard matte black finish. It was offered with the standard manual transmission or the optional Selectronic CVT.

The Y10 Marazzi Certa, which was presented at the 1992 Turin Motor Show, was a security-focused variant developed by Carrozzeria Marazzi and based on the Y10 Avenue variant. Dubbed by the press as an "anti-abduction utilitarian," it was specifically aimed at female buyers concerned about personal safety. The car featured reinforced door structures and locks, along with shatterproof glass. An optional small interior safe was available for carrying valuables. Production was limited to 300 units per year, with a launch price of 24 million lire.

== Third series (1992–1996) ==
In mid-1992, the Y10 received its final facelift, marking the third series. Exterior updates brought the styling closer to contemporary Lancia models, particularly the Dedra: the front end featured a smaller, more compact grille, slimmer and elongated headlights, and redesigned bumpers. At the rear, the distinctive matte black tailgate was now partially body-coloured, complemented by new taillight clusters. The interior saw a complete dashboard redesign with softer lines and no sharp edges, improving both aesthetics and safety.

The initial range consisted of three trim levels: base, Elite, and Avenue. From 1993, these were supplemented by special editions including the Mia, Igloo, Junior, and the Selectronic-equipped Ville; the updated form of the 4WD, which was later renamed sestrieres, joined the range in 1994.

Mechanically, the catalysed 1,108 cc (68 cu in) FIRE engine remained the standard powerplant, producing 50 hp (37 kW) at 5,250 rpm across manual, Selectronic, and 4WD variants. In 1995, output was increased to 54 hp (40 kW) at 5,500 rpm with 86 N⋅m (64 lb⋅ft) of torque at 3,250 rpm, raising top speed to 155 km/h (96 mph) for manual versions and 150 km/h (93 mph) for the Selectronic. Between 1992 and 1994, the Elite was optionally available with the 1,301 cc (79 cu in) Brazilian FIASA engine, developing 72 hp (53 kW) at 5,750 rpm and 100 N⋅m (74 lb⋅ft) of torque at 3,250 rpm. This version achieved a top speed of 170 km/h (106 mph) and could be specified with air conditioning. Production of the Y10 continued until late 1995, with total output across all series exceeding 942,000 units.

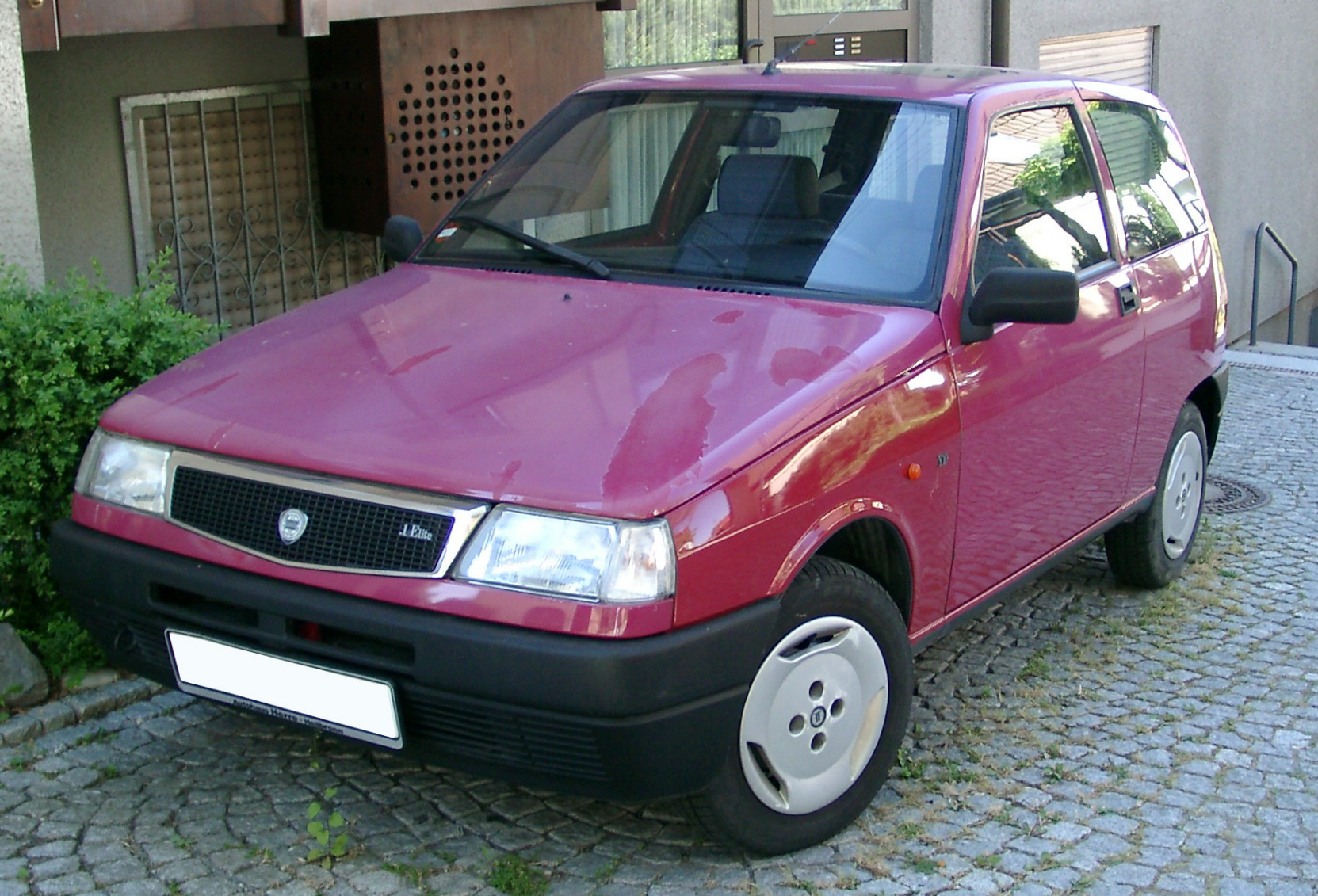
Y10 Third Series front

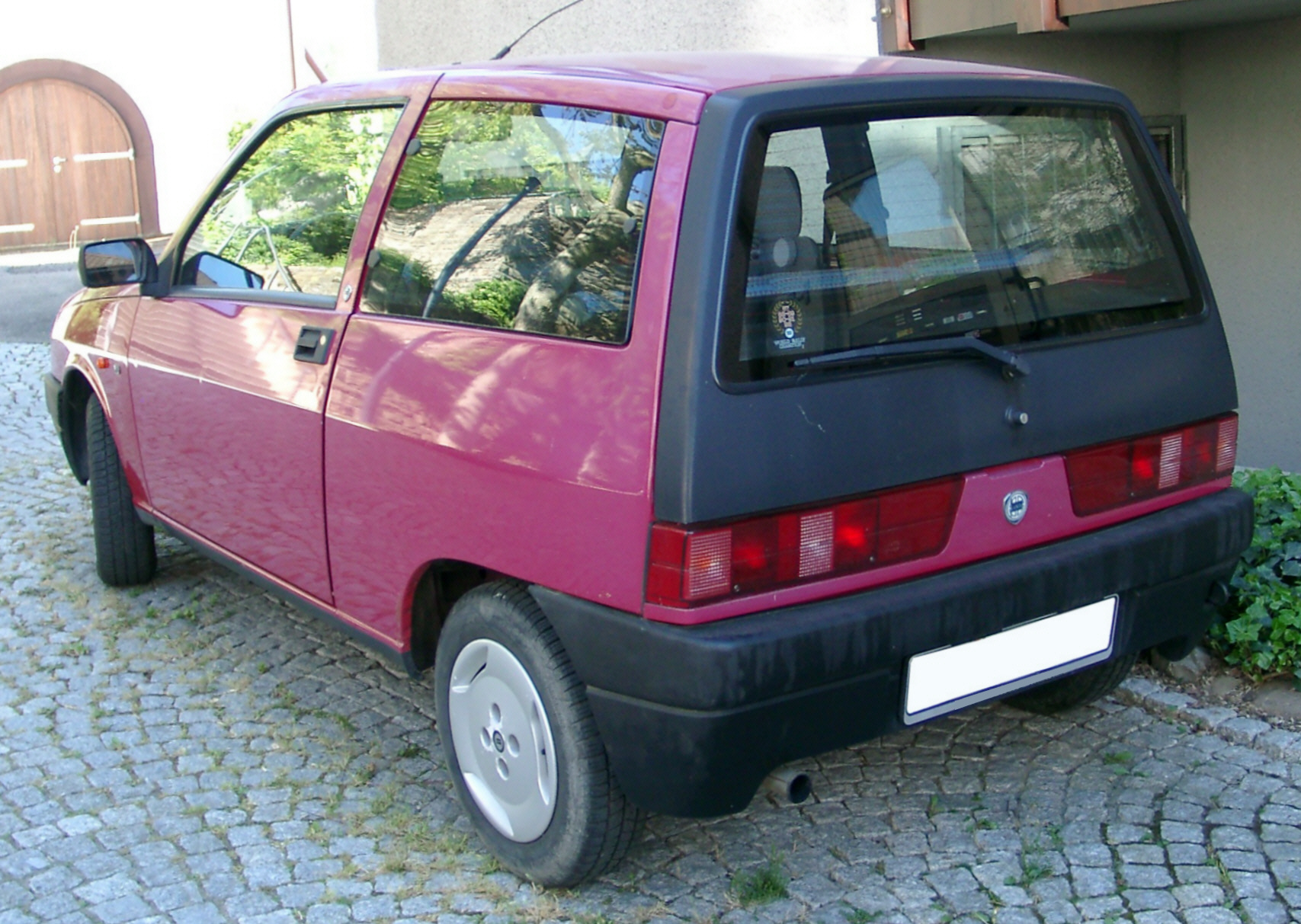
Y10 Third Series rear
