= Tom Tjaarda =

American car designer (1934–2017)

- Born: Stevens Thompson Tjaarda van Starkenburg; July 23, 1934; Detroit, Michigan, U.S.
- Died: June 2, 2017 (aged 82); Turin, Italy
- Education: University of Michigan
- Engineering career
- Discipline: Car designer
- Practice name: Tom Tjaarda

Tom Tjaarda (born Stevens Thompson Tjaarda van Starkenburg; July 23, 1934 – June 2, 2017) was an American automobile designer noted for his work on a broad range of automobiles — estimated at over eighty — from exotic sports cars including the Ferrari 365 California and De Tomaso Pantera to high-volume popular cars including the first generation Ford Fiesta (1976) and the Fiat 124 Spider (1966).

For his work, Tjaarda was honored at the 1997 Pebble Beach Concours d'Elegance as well as the 1997 Concorso Italiano.

Jalopnik called Tjaarda "one of the defining automotive designers of the 20th century." Noted automotive designer and journalist Robert Cumberford called Tjaarda "one of the world’s most accomplished Italian car designers." Car Design News called him "one of the great unsung heroes of the car design world."

== Background ==
Tjaarda was born in Detroit, the son of Irene Tjaarda and Dutch auto designer John Tjaarda (born Joop Tjaarda van Starkenburg, 1897–1962), designer of the 1935 Lincoln Zephyr.

Tjaarda's parents divorced in 1939 and he lived with his mother in Detroit. Tjaarda studied high school in Birmingham High School, Birmingham, Michigan (1953 renamed to Seaholm High School).

== Career ==
Tjaarda studied Architecture at the University of Michigan and presented an automobile (a sport station wagon) rather than building design for his senior thesis — winning an internship at Carrozzeria Ghia, the renowned Italian design house.

In 1958, he moved to Turin, Italy, where his career began and where he continued to live and work.

Tjaarda started his career at Ghia with the Innocenti 950.

By 1961 had moved to Pininfarina, where he went on to work on designs that included the Chevrolet Corvette Rondine, the Ferrari 330GT 2+2, the Fiat 124 Spider, and the Ferrari 365 California.

He later returned to Ghia, where he designed the Isuzu Bellett MX1600 concept, the De Tomaso Pantera, and the De Tomaso Longchamp.

In 1981, Tom was appointed as Director of Fiat Advanced Studios. In 1984, he started his own independent design firm, Dimensione Design.

== Design portfolio ==
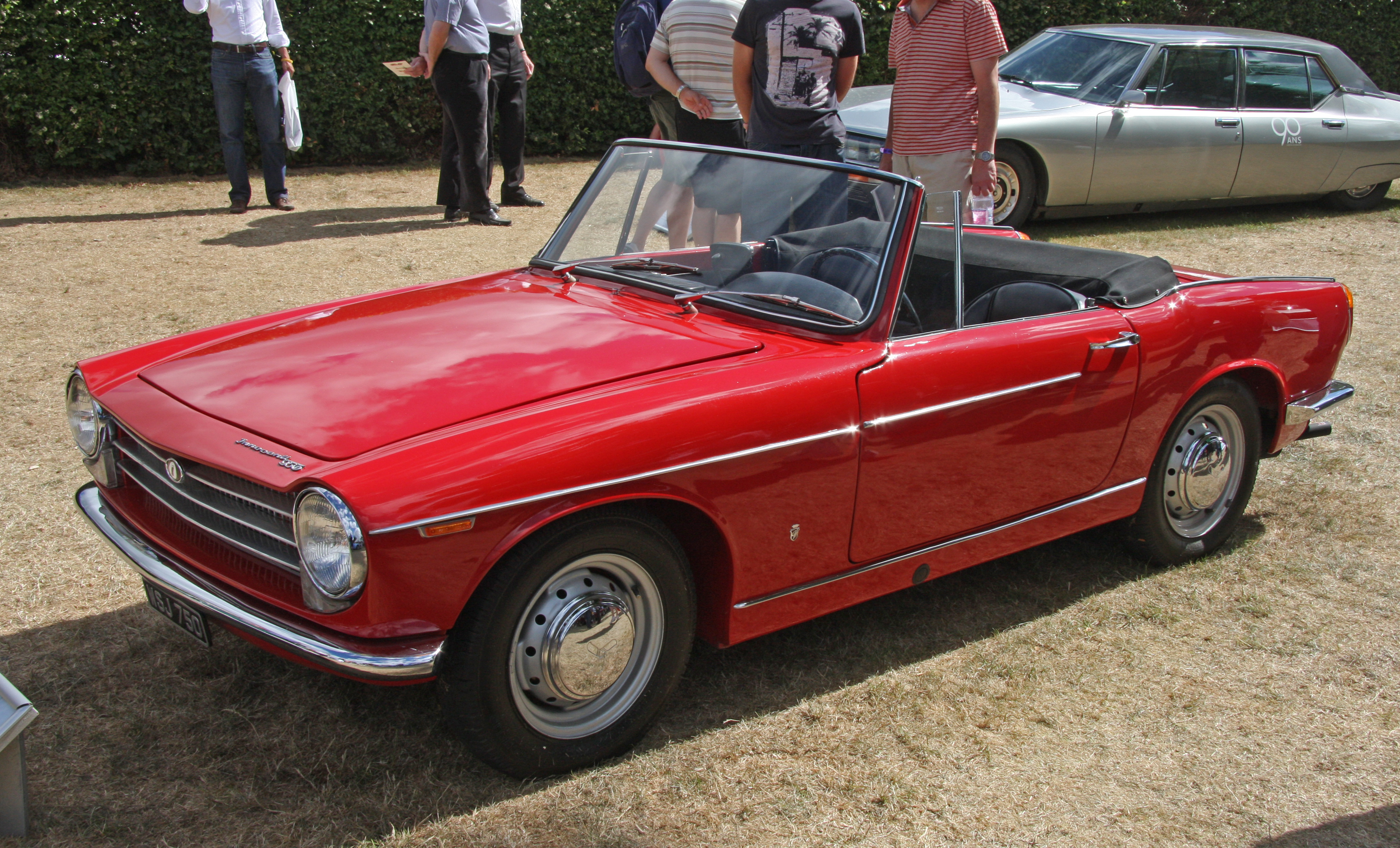
Innocenti 950 S Ghia Spider 950

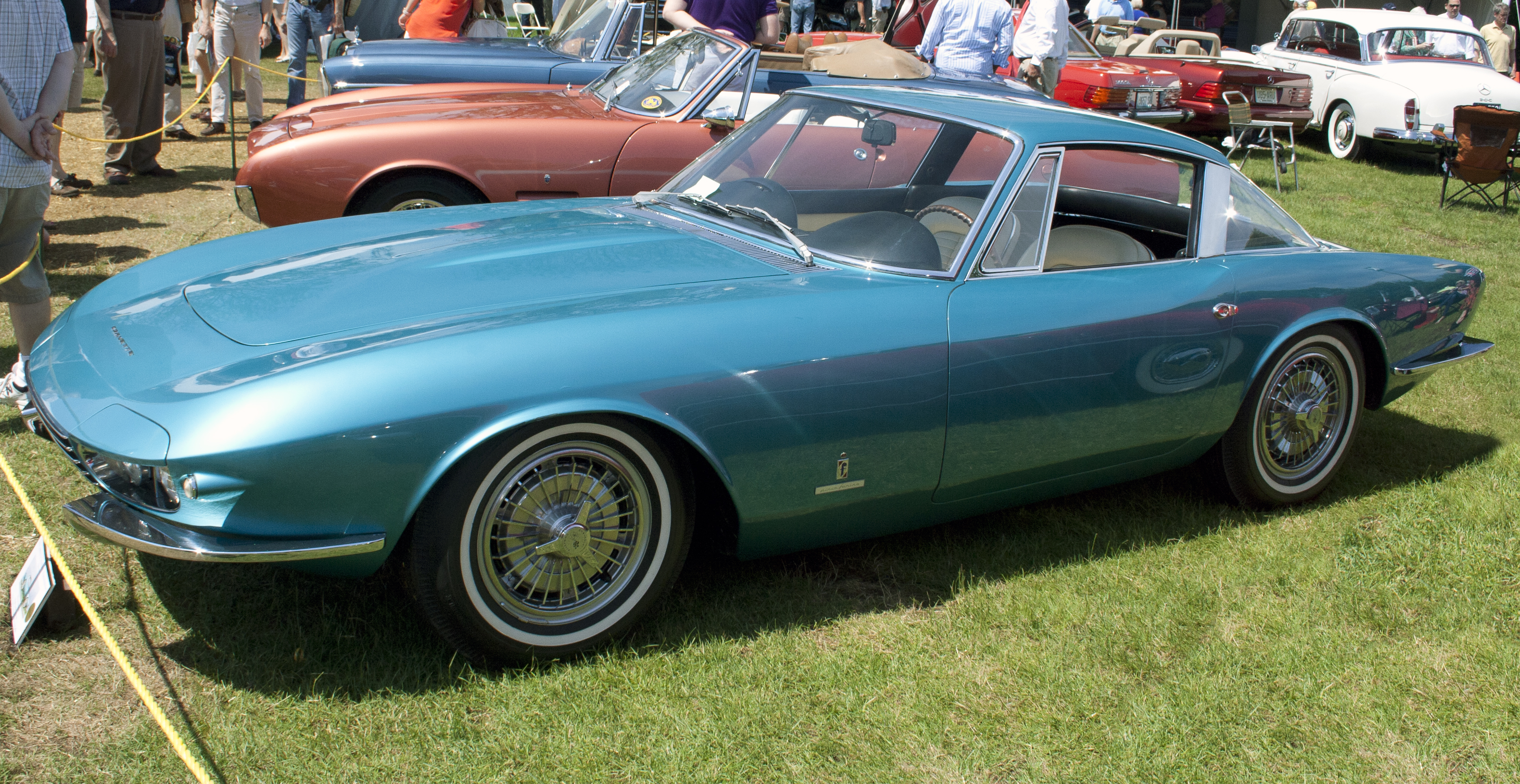
1963 Corvette Rondine

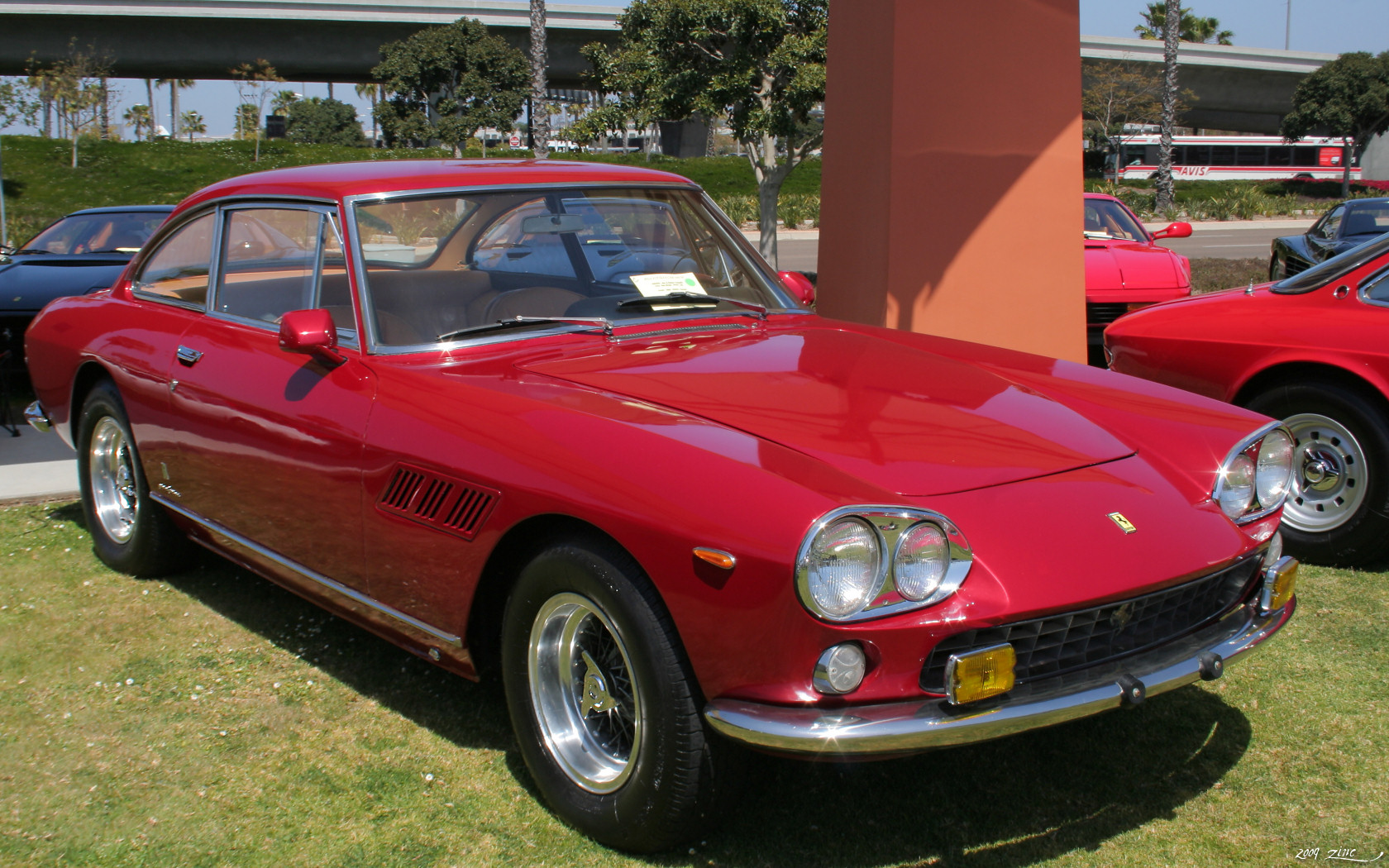
Ferrari 330 GT 2+2

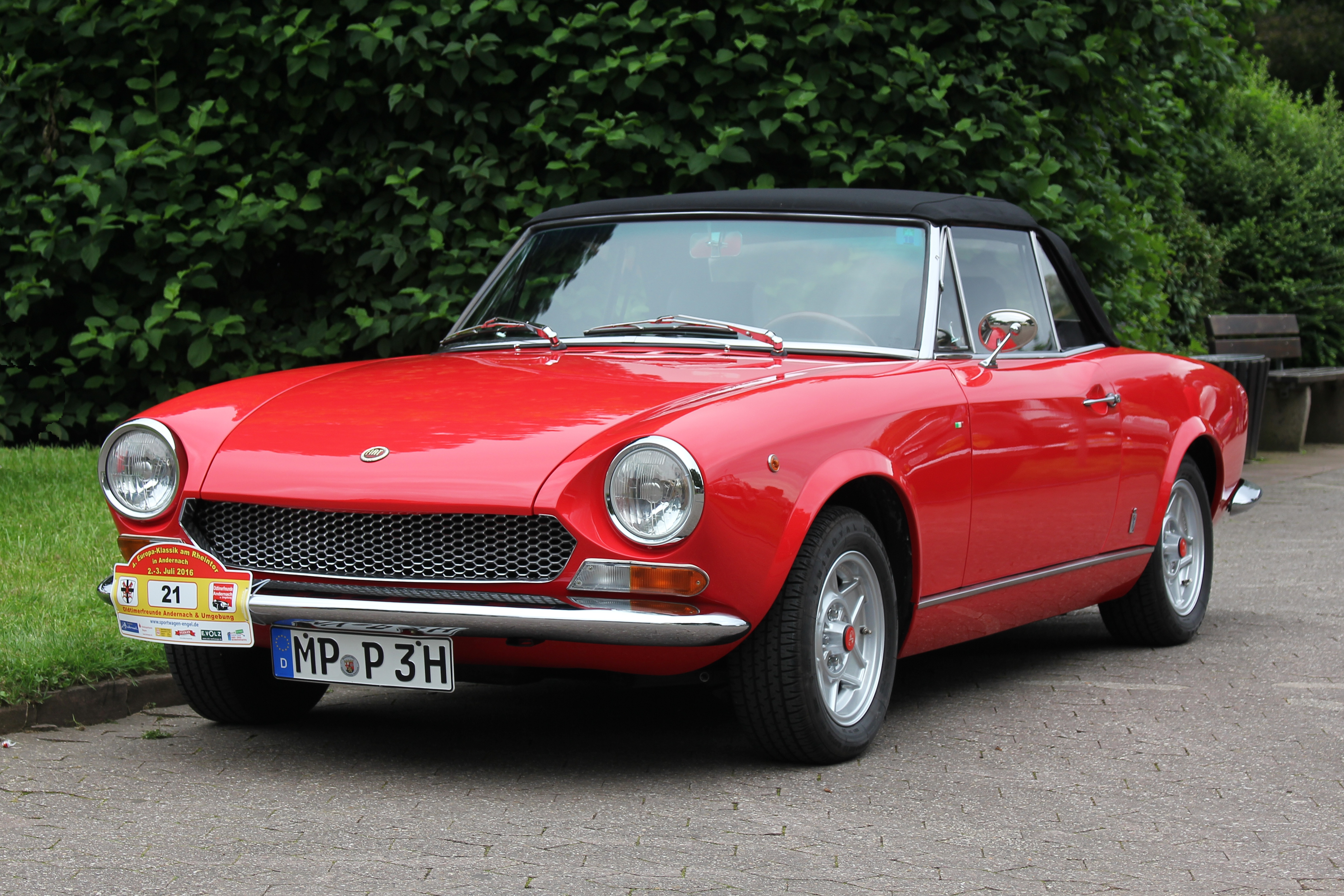
Fiat 124 Spider, 1.4 L, 1970

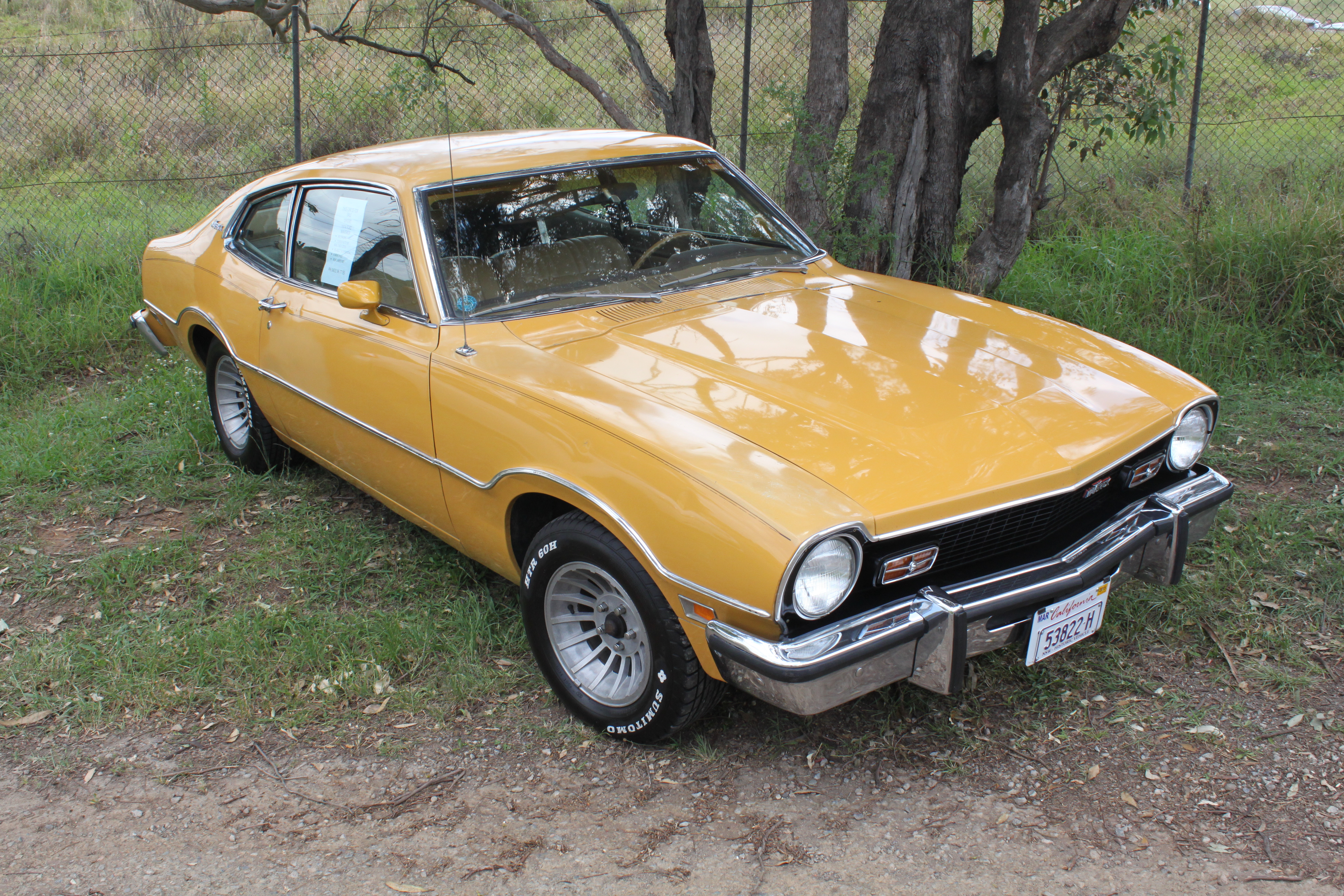
1974 Ford Maverick

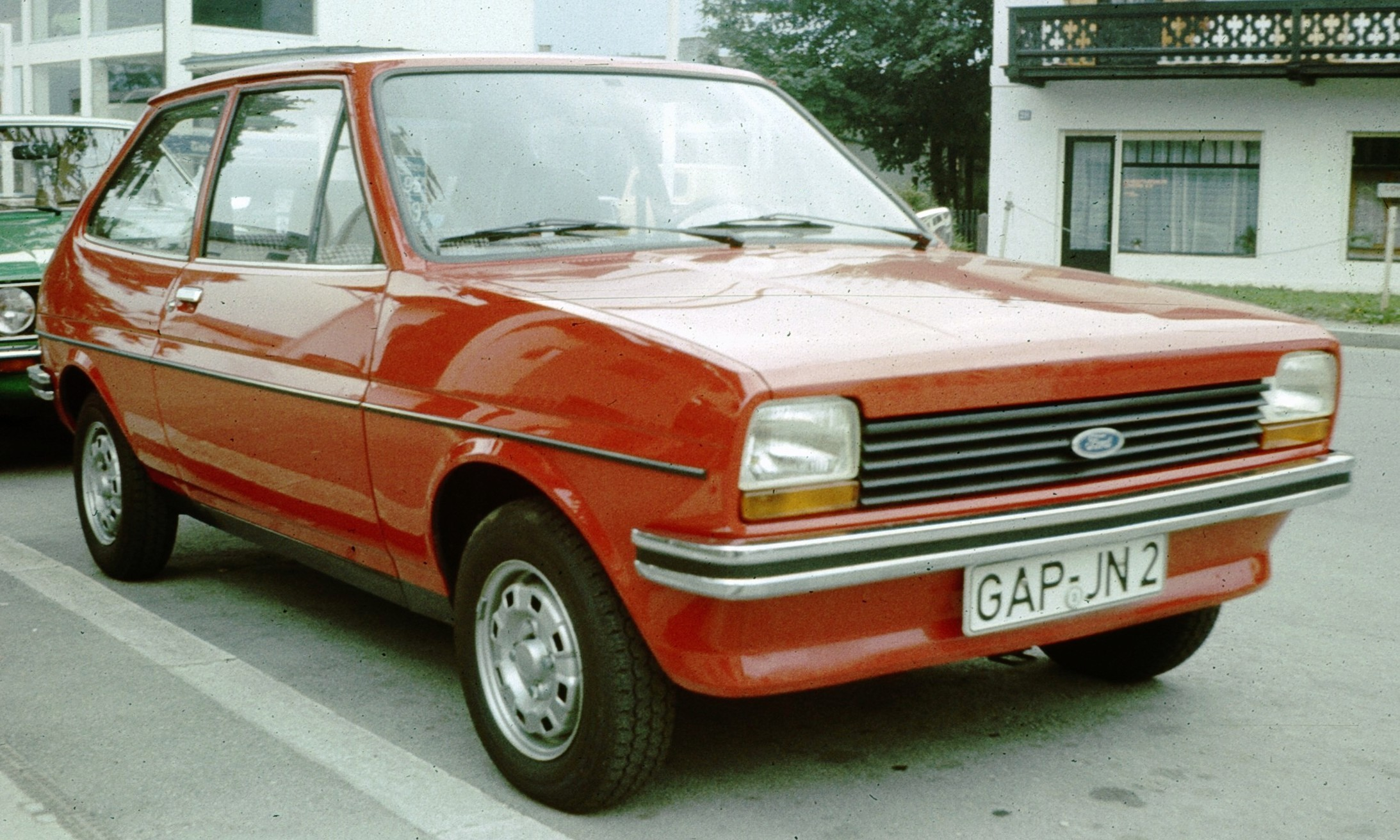
Ford Fiesta MKI

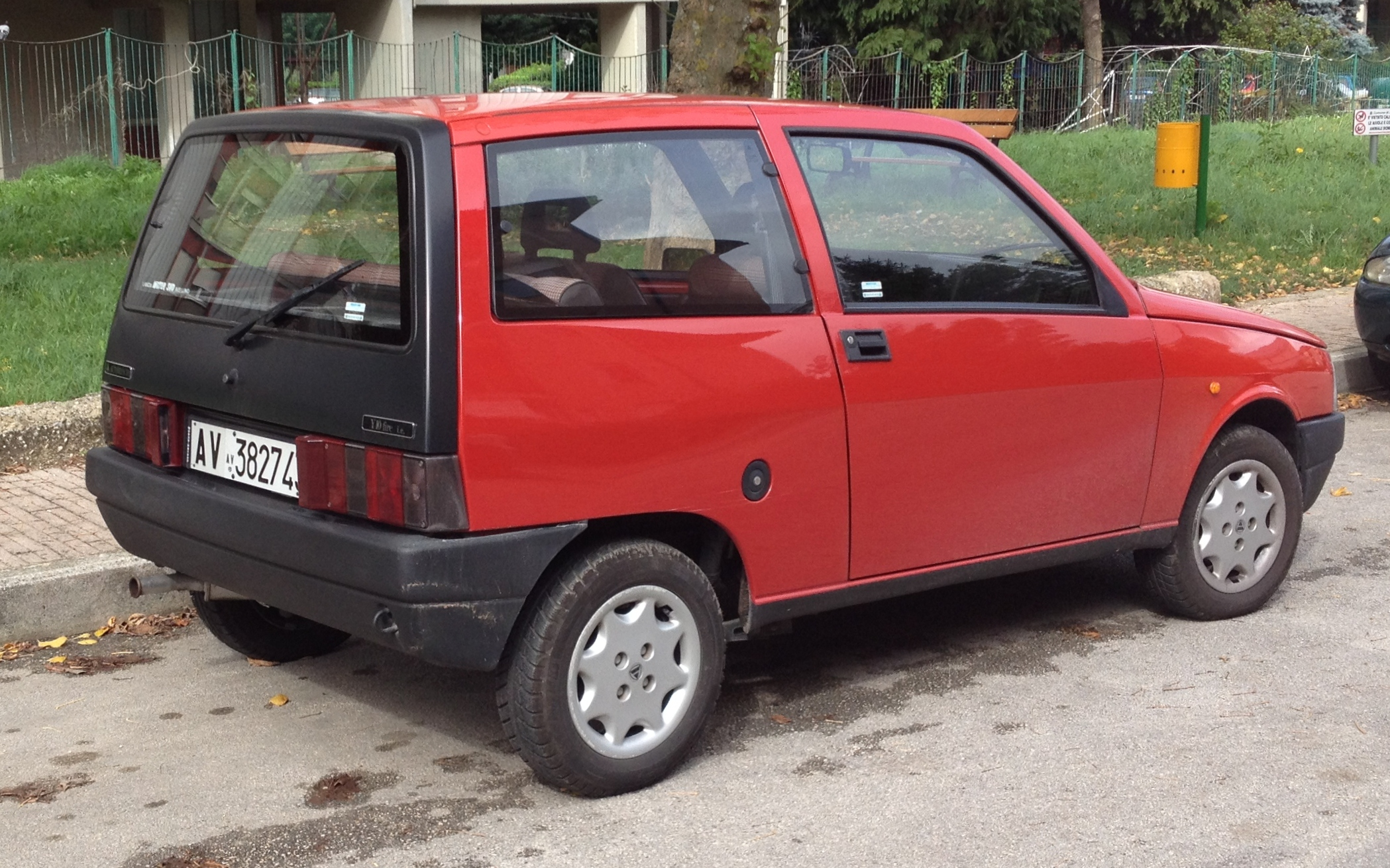
Autobianchi Y10

- 1959. Ghia Selene I
- 1960. Innocenti 950 S Ghia Spider
- 1960. (Innocenti) Ghia IXG Dragster
- 1960. Renault Dauphine Ghia Coupé
- 1960. Volkswagen Karmann Ghia 1500 (type 34) Coupé (rear design; main body design by Sergio Sartorelli)
- 1961. Ferbedo Automobilina pedal car (Ghia)
- 1961. Ghia Cart
- 1961. Innocenti 950 Spider
- 1962. Chevrolet Corvair Pininfarina Coupé (I)
- 1963. Chevrolet Corvette Rondine Pininfarina Coupé (I)
- 1963. Fiat 2300 Pininfarina
- 1963. Lancia Flaminia 2.8 Pininfarina Coupé Speciale
- 1964. Chevrolet Corvette Rondine Pininfarina Coupé (II)
- 1964. Ferrari 330 GT 2+2 Pininfarina series 1
- 1964. Mercedes 230 SL Pininfarina Coupé
- 1965. Fiat 124 Sport Spider Pininfarina
- 1966. Ferrari 365 California
- 1968. Ghia Centurion (with Giorgetto Giugiaro and Rowan Industries)
- 1968. Serenissima Coupé (Ghia)
- 1969. De Tomaso Mustela (I) (Ghia)
- 1969. Isuzu Bellett MX1600 GT (Ghia)
- 1969. Lancia Flaminia Marica (Ghia)
- 1969. Lancia Fulvia 1600 HF Competizione (Ghia)
- 1970. De Tomaso Deauville (Ghia)
- 1970. De Tomaso Pantera Ghia
- 1970. Sinthesis 2000 Berlinetta
- 1970. Williams De Tomaso-Ford (Cosworth) 505/38 (De Tomaso Formula 1)
- 1971. All-Cars AutoZodiaco Damaca
- 1971. De Tomaso 1600 (Ghia) Spider
- 1971. De Tomaso Zonda (Ghia)
- 1971. Isuzu Bellett SportsWagon (Ghia)
- 1972. De Tomaso Longchamp
- 1972. Ford Fiesta (Ghia, Project "Wolf")
- 1973. De Tomaso Pantera 7X (Montella, Ghia)
- 1973. Ford Mustela (II) (Ghia)
- 1974. Ford Ghia Coins
- 1974. Ford Maverick
- 1979. Fiat Brazil
- 1979. Ford Mustang II Proposals (Ghia) (different variants)
- 1979. Zastava (facelifts of older Fiat-based models for Yugoslavia)
- 1980. De Tomaso Longchamp Cabrio
- 1981. SEAT Ronda
- 1981. SEAT Guappa Coupé
- 1982. Chrysler LeBaron concept
- 1982. Chrysler Imperial Coupe concept
- 1983. Rayton-Fissore Taxi Torino
- 1985. Autobianchi/Lancia Y10 (with Antonio Piovano)
- 1985. Rayton-Fissore Magnum 4x4
- 1989. Aston Martin Lagonda Coupé concept
- 1988. PPG 4x4 (USA)
- 1989. Laforza Magnum 4x4
- 1989. Zastava Utility vehicle
- 1991. Bitter Tasco
- 1992. Suzuki Coupé (for Bugatti)
- 1993. Fiat Iveco Truck Interior
- 1995. Lamborghini Diablo (Interior)
- 1998. Isotta-Fraschini T8 Coupé
- 1998. Isotta-Fraschini T12 Coupé
- 2000. Qvale Mangusta (II)
- 2001. Laforza PSV (II) (production engineering only)
- 2002. Spyker GT Sport
- 2003. Fiat Barchetta (Facelift)
- 2006. Shelby Series 2
- 2007. Tjaarda Mustang
