= Tony Dean (racing driver) =

British racing driver

- Nationality: British
- Born: Anthony Gordon Dean; February 23, 1932 Leeds, UK
- Died: January 17, 2008 (aged 75) Leeds, UK
- Retired: Circa 1992
- Years active: 1963–c.1992

Championship titles
- 1965: British Formula Three Championship

Anthony Gordon Dean (23 February 1932 – 17 January 2008) was a British racing driver from England who competed in sports car racing, touring car racing, the Can-Am series and various single seat formulae, including non-championship Formula One, in the 1960s, 1970s, and 1980s. He is known for winning the 1970 Road Atlanta Can-Am as a privateer entrant in the underpowered Porsche 908/02 chassis 011.

== Racing career ==
=== Early career ===
Dean began his career in kart racing, before moving into club-racing in 1963, after the motor-dealership he worked for acquired a Lotus Eleven. In his first race, at Rufforth, he qualified in pole position and finished second. He continued with the Lotus in 1964 before moving into single-seaters in 1965, winning the BRSCC British Formula Three Championship in a Brabham BT15. He entered the Monaco Grand Prix Formula Three support race where he finished second in his heat and third in the final behind Formula One drivers, Peter Revson and Chris Irwin. He also successfully campaigned a Lotus 23 in sports car racing winning races at Oulton Park, Mallory Park and Brands Hatch.

In 1966, Dean drove in various single-seat formulae in the UK, competing mainly in the BRSCC championship with a Lotus 41 or Brabham BT18 entered in conjunction with John Willment. He also competed in Formula Libre events using the Brabham and on one occasion a BRM fitted with a Ford 4.7-litre V8 as used in the AC Cobra. He also competed in sportscars with a Brabham BT8, finishing second in both the Lavant Cup at Goodwood and the Tourist Trophy at Silverstone together with a third place in the Norbury Trophy at Crystal Palace.

Dean moved into sports car racing in 1967, entering as A. G. Dean Racing Ltd. with a Porsche Carrera 6. Co-driven by Ben Pon the car finished eighth overall in the BOAC 500 at Brands Hatch. Although he achieved a number of top-six finishes throughout the season, his only victory was at the Brands Hatch GT meeting in August.

1968 began with a third place in the South African Sports Car Club meeting at Cape Town using the Porsche 906. On returning to the UK, he took four consecutive wins at Croft and Cadwell Park using a Ferrari Dino 206 S. Co-driven by Mike Beckwith, the car did not finish in the Brands Hatch six hour race but Dean achieved third place in the Oulton Park 100 mile race. In the remainder of the season, Dean competed in a further 20 races, mainly with the Dino, but also with the Carrera 6 and finished outside the top six on only one occasion. He did not finish in only three events and took additional wins at Croft and Crystal Palace (twice each) and Oulton Park. He finished fourth in the Guards Trophy at Brands Hatch with the Porsche. Co-driven by Bill Bradley, Dean failed to finish in the Paris 1,000 km race, in the Porsche but finished fifth in the nine-hour race at Kyalami and second in a three-hour race at Cape Town, in the Ferrari Dino, co-driven on each occasion by Basil van Rooyen.

=== Can-Am ===
In 1969, Dean continued to enter domestic national and international level events finishing seventh in the Brands Hatch six hour race in a Chevron B8. Teamed with Bradley, in a 1966 Porsche 910 he finished 12th in both the Spa and Nürburgring 1,000 kilometre events.

For 1969, Porsche had upgraded the 1968 Porsche 908 coupe into the 1969 open top Porsche 908/02 which won the 1969 World Sportscar Championship when entered by the factory team. Most of the cars were sold to privateers cars, with Dean getting chassis 011 and 015.

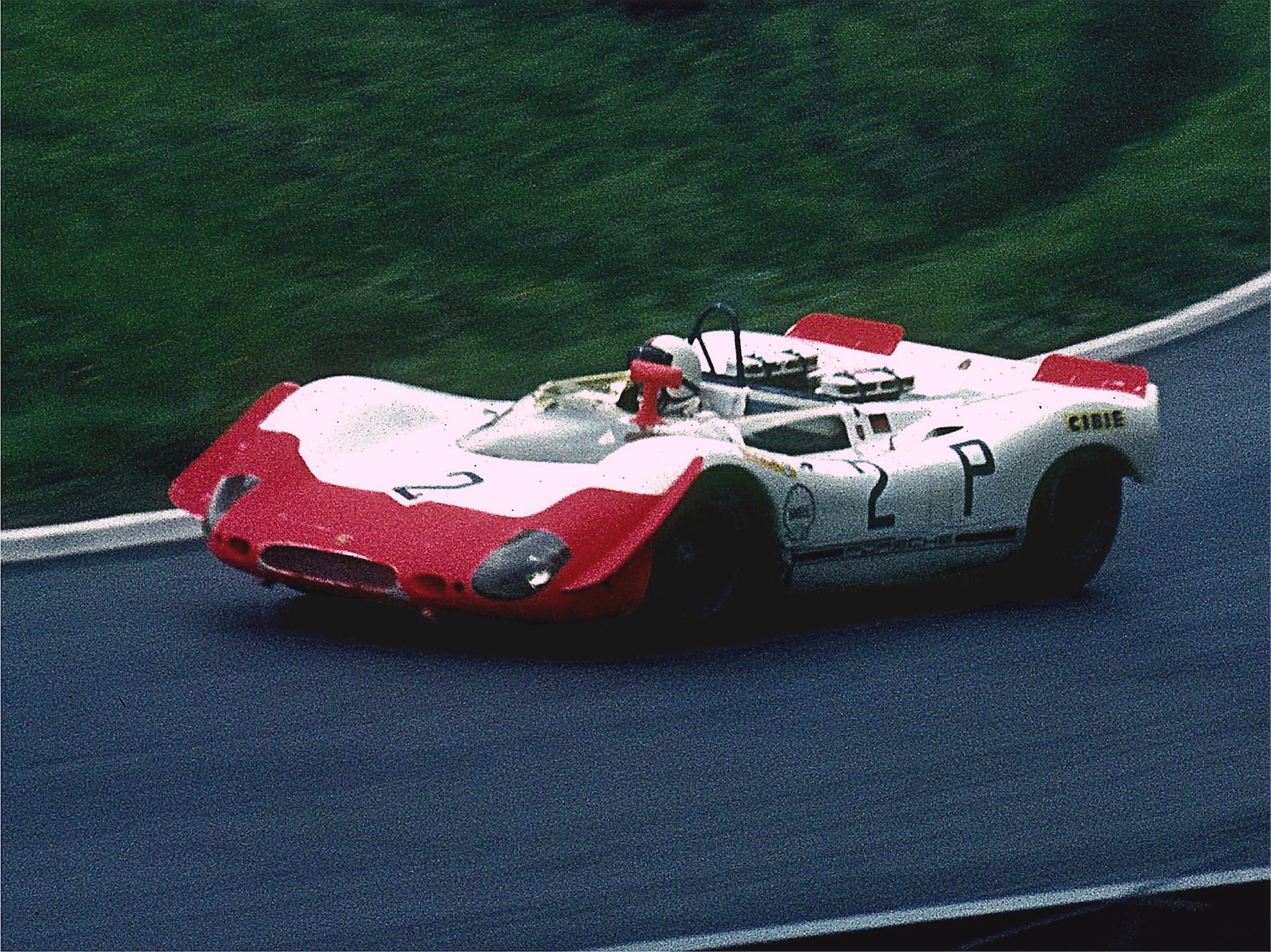
Gerhard Mitter in Porsche 908/02 chassis 015 at the 1969 1000km Nürburgring.

In July, alongside Richard Attwood and Vic Elford, he finished second in the 6 Hours race at Watkins Glen, in a Porsche 908/02. The next day, Dean entered the same chassis 015 in the Watkins Glen round of the Can-Am series and finished ninth. Dean competed in seven further Can-Am races in 1969, with the 908/02, entered in the name of Porsche Audi. He finished all of them in the top eight places with a best result of fifth at Road America yielding eighth place in the championship.

In both 1968 and 1969, A. G. Dean Racing entered the British Saloon Car Championship with Lotus Cortinas and later a Ford Escort. Dean did not compete in many of the rounds but achieved some good class placings. In 1968, team driver Brian Robinson finished in third position in the title standings.

Dean drove a BRM P261 in the 1969 Madrid Grand Prix at Jarama. He spun at the start, being unused to a Formula One car, but recovered and contemporary reports show that he finished second having completed 39 out of 40 laps. However, Peter Gethin (McLaren) is classified as second in some later reports, having broken down on lap 40.

Dean entered two races at Buenos Aires in January 1970, in the Porsche 908/02, on each occasion co-driven by Eduardo Copello. They finished third in the 1,000 km race but failed to finish in a 200-mile race, a week later. An entry was made in the 24 Hours of Daytona alongside Peter Gregg in a Porsche 917 but the car did not start the race. However, the Porsche 908 finished sixth in the Brands Hatch 1,000 km race co-driven by Gérard Larrousse and G. Koch, but Dean did not participate. He then returned to the Can-Am championship, entering under his own name, with a fourth-placed finish at Mosport Park in June, but was seven laps behind the winning McLaren M8D of Dan Gurney. At the next round at St. Jovite, Dean did not start and subsequently failed to finish in a six-hour race at Watkins Glen, where the car was co-driven by Revson. However, the following day, Dean entered the Can-Am round at the same venue and finished 16th. This was followed by an 11th place at the Edmonton round, a failure to finish at Mid-Ohio and fifth at Road America.

At the 1970 Road Atlanta Can-Am round at Road Atlanta, run in very hot conditions, Dean benefited from the loss of the McLarens of Denny Hulme and Gethin (who also had gearbox problems), and Revson's Lola through accidents, together with mechanical problems for the Chaparral and BRM entries, enabling him to win the race. This was the first victory, in the series, for a car other than a McLaren in 19 races.

This was followed by a seventh place at Donnybrooke, a failure to start at Laguna Seca after an accident and ninth place at Riverside. He finished the year with sixth place in the championship standings.

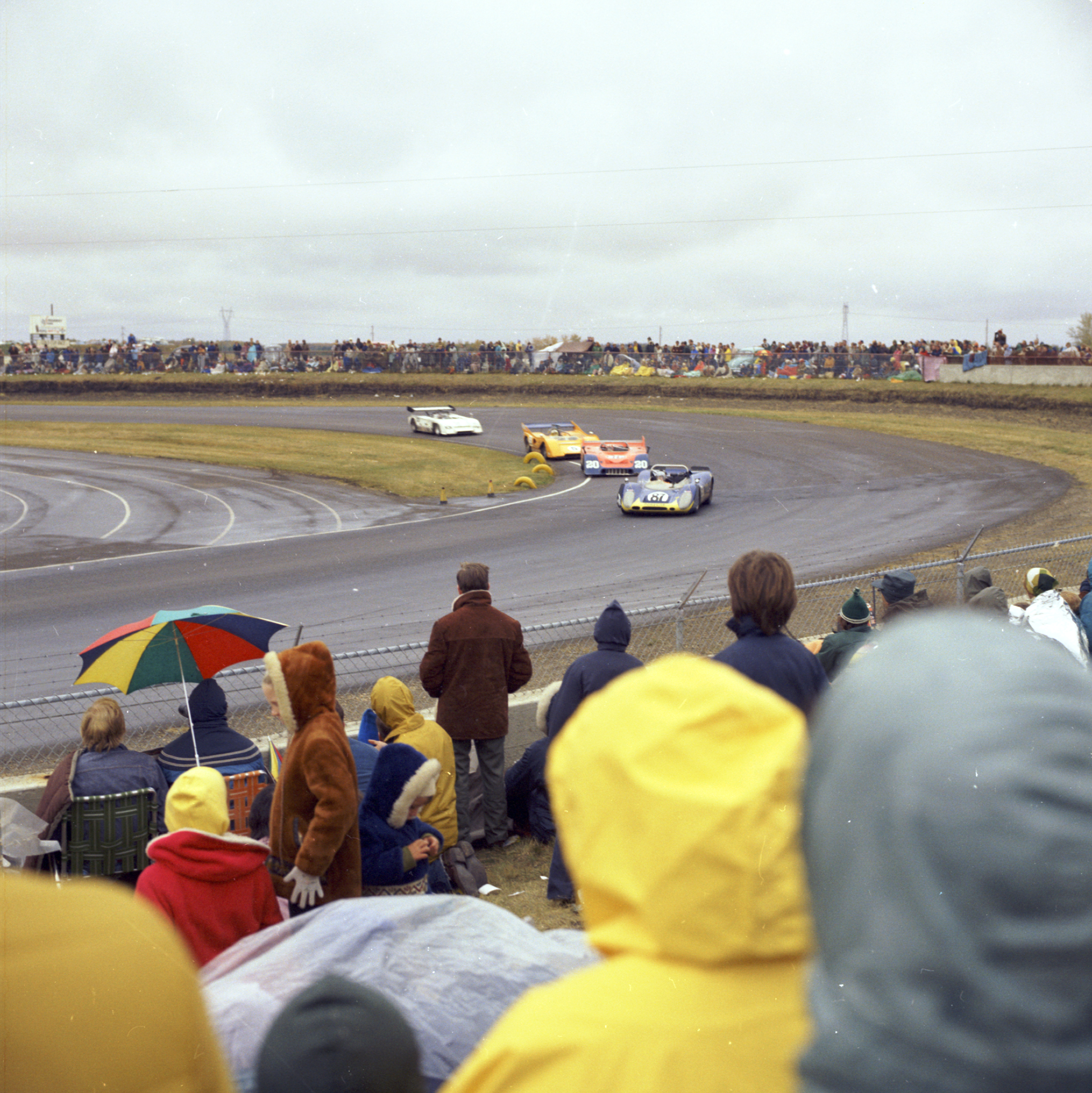
Can-Am Race, Edmonton Speedway, September 1971, with Dean's Porsche 908/02 chassis 015 No. 87 driven by Steve Matchett

In 1971, Dean began the year with a victory at Oulton Park with the Porsche 908, followed by a seventh place in the International Trophy at Silverstone in a McLaren M7A-Chevrolet. Dean then returned to the Can-Am series with a McLaren M8D, but after not-starting at Mosport in June, the car finished fourth at St. Jovite two weeks later driven by Chuck Parsons. He then entered the six hour race at Watkins Glen with the Porsche 908 but did not finish. He did not start the Can-Am rounds at Mid-Ohio and Laguna Seca (entering the McLaren on both occasions) but finished the year with 14th place at Riverside using the Porsche. He was not-classified in the championship.

Dean resumed with the Porsche in 1972, but did not finish at the six hours of Daytona race or the Interserie round at Silverstone. However, he then returned to Watkins Glen, with fourth place in the Porsche at the six-hour event. The next day, Dean took the car to ninth in the Can-Am round at the same circuit, but was eight laps down. This was followed by 14th place at the next round at Mid-Ohio. Dean was not-classified in the Championship. He then entered the Rothmans 50,000 at Brands Hatch with a Brabham BT30 and the John Player Challenge Trophy with a McLaren M14A but did not qualify for either, although he finished third in a "consolation" race for non-qualifiers at the Rothmans event. He also entered the 1972 International Gold Cup, with the McLaren but did not attend.

=== Later career ===
In 1973, Dean competed in the Race of Champions and the BRDC International Trophy with a Chevron B24 entered by Anglo-American Racing Team (formed by Dean and American racer Bobby Brown). He finished fifth and 11th respectively. He finished second in the 1973 F5000 Championship behind Teddy Pilette. In 1974, he was not classified at the Race of Champions and finished 12th at the International trophy. He dropped to 16th in the F5000 championship but won a wet two-part (restarted) race at Brands Hatch on August Bank Holiday Monday.

In 1975, Dean competed in Formula 5000 in America, participating in three races with a Chevron B28 and finishing in 17th place in the USAC championship. In addition he participated in the European Formula 5000 Championship achieving two podium positions and finishing 12th in the title standings.

Dean entered the 1979 Hitachi Trophy at Brands Hatch in April. This was a support race for the Race of Champions for Formula Two and Formula Atlantic cars. Dean did not finish, retiring after five laps with a gearbox problem.

In 1979 and 1980, Dean competed in the Aurora Formula One Championship using a Chevron B42-Hart. He finished joint 23rd in the championship in 1979 achieving one sixth-place finish and 18th in 1980 with one fifth- and one sixth-placed finish.

Although Dean's career in major championships declined after the Aurora series, he continued to race, and was still competing in large-capacity single-seaters in America in his 60s.

== Personal life ==
Dean spent most of his working life in the motor trade, as a result of which, together with an ability to obtain sponsorship, he was able to fund his racing career.

Dean was convicted of evading duty on cigars imported into the UK, possibly as a result of his association with Bobby Brown, who never faced charges.

His son, Richard Dean, was also a racing driver.

Dean died on 17 January 2008 after a short illness.

== Racing record ==
=== Non-championship Formula One results ===
(key)

| Year | Entrant | Chassis | Engine | 1 | 2 | 3 | 4 | 5 | 6 | 7 | 8 |
|---|---|---|---|---|---|---|---|---|---|---|---|
| 1969 | A.G. Dean | BRM P261 | BRM P101 3.0 V12 | ROC | INT | MAD; 2† | OUL | | | | |
| 1971 | A.G. Dean | McLaren M7A (F5000) | Chevrolet 5.0 V8 | ARG | ROC | QUE | SPR | INT; 7 | RIN | OUL | VIC |
| 1972 | A.G. Dean | McLaren M14A (F5000) | Chevrolet 5.0 V8 | ROC | BRA | INT | OUL | REP | VIC; DNQ | | |
| 1973 | Anglo-American Racing Team | Chevron B24 (F5000) | Chevrolet 5.0 V8 | ROC; 5 | INT; 11 | | | | | | |
| 1974 | Anglo-American Racing Team | Chevron B24 (F5000) | Chevrolet 5.0 V8 | PRE | ROC; Ret | INT; 12 | | | | | |

†Some later reports classify Dean as third: see text

=== Complete European F5000 Championship results ===
(key) (Races in bold indicate pole position; races in italics indicate fastest lap.)

| Year | Entrant | Chassis | Engine | 1 | 2 | 3 | 4 | 5 | 6 | 7 | 8 | 9 | 10 | 11 | 12 | 13 | 14 | 15 | 16 | 17 | 18 | Pos. | Pts |
|---|---|---|---|---|---|---|---|---|---|---|---|---|---|---|---|---|---|---|---|---|---|---|---|
| 1969 | A.G. Dean | Brabham BT23C | Ford Cosworth FVA 1.6 L4 | OUL | BRH | BRH | MAL | SIL | MON | KOK | ZAN | SNE | HOC | OUL; 18 | BRH | | | | | | | 48th | 50 |
| 1971 | A.G. Dean | McLaren M7A | Chevrolet 5.0 V8 | MAL; Ret | SNE | BRH; 4 | MON; 10 | SIL; 2 | CAS; Ret | MAL | MNZ | MAL | THR | SIL | OUL | SNE | HOC | OUL | BRH | BRH | | 11th | 9 |
| 1972 | A.G. Dean | McLaren M14A | Chevrolet 5.0 V8 | BRH | MAL | SNE | BRH | NIV | SIL | MON; 10 | OUL; Ret | MAL; DNS | BRH | SIL | BRH | OUL | BRH; 13 | | | | | NC | 0 |
| 1973 | Anglo-American Racing Team | Chevron B24 | Chevrolet 5.0 V8 | BRH; 3 | MAL; 5 | SIL; 3 | SNE; 4 | BRH; 3 | **OUL**; 5 | MAL; Ret | MIS | MAL; DNS | MON; 4 | SIL; C | BRH; 3 | OUL; 3 | JYL; Ret | ZAN; 2 | **SNE**; 9 | BRH; 4 | | 2nd | 133 |
| 1974 | Anglo-American Racing Team | Chevron B24 | Chevrolet 5.0 V8 | BRH; Ret | MAL; Ret | SIL; 7 | OUL; Ret | BRH | ZOL; 7 | THR; Ret | ZAN; Ret | MUG | MNZ | MAL; Ret | MON | THR | BRH; 1 | OUL; Ret | SNE | MAL | BRH; DNS | 16th | 28 |
| 1975 | A.G. Dean | Chevron B24 | Chevrolet 5.0 V8 | BRH; Ret | OUL; Ret | BRH; 3 | | | | | | | | | | | | | | | | 12th | 28 |
| 1975 | A.G. Dean | Chevron B24/B28 | Chevrolet 5.0 V8 | | | | **SIL**; 3 | ZOL; Ret | ZAN; Ret | THR; 5 | SNE | | | | | | | | | | | 12th | 28 |
| 1975 | A.G. Dean | Chevron B28 | Chevrolet 5.0 V8 | | | | | | | | | MAL; 5 | THR | BRH | OUL | SIL | SNE | MAL | BRH | | | 12th | 28 |

=== Complete British Formula One Championship results ===
(key)

| Year | Entrant | Chassis | Engine | 1 | 2 | 3 | 4 | 5 | 6 | 7 | 8 | 9 | 10 | 11 | 12 | 13 | 14 | 15 | Pos. | Pts |
|---|---|---|---|---|---|---|---|---|---|---|---|---|---|---|---|---|---|---|---|---|
| 1979 | A. G. Dean Racing | Chevron B42 | Hart 420R 2.0 L4 | ZOL; 12 | OUL; NC | BRH | MAL; 9 | SNE | THR | ZAN | DON; 11 | OUL; Ret | NOG; 6 | MAL | BRH | THR | SNE | SIL | 23rd | 1 |
| 1980 | A. G. Dean Racing | Chevron B42 | Hart 420R 2.0 L4 | OUL; 6 | BRH; 5 | SIL; 9 | MAL; Ret | THR | MNZ | MAL | SNE | BRH | THR | OUL | SIL | | | | 14th | 3 |
