= Andrea de Adamich =

Italian racing driver (1941–2025)

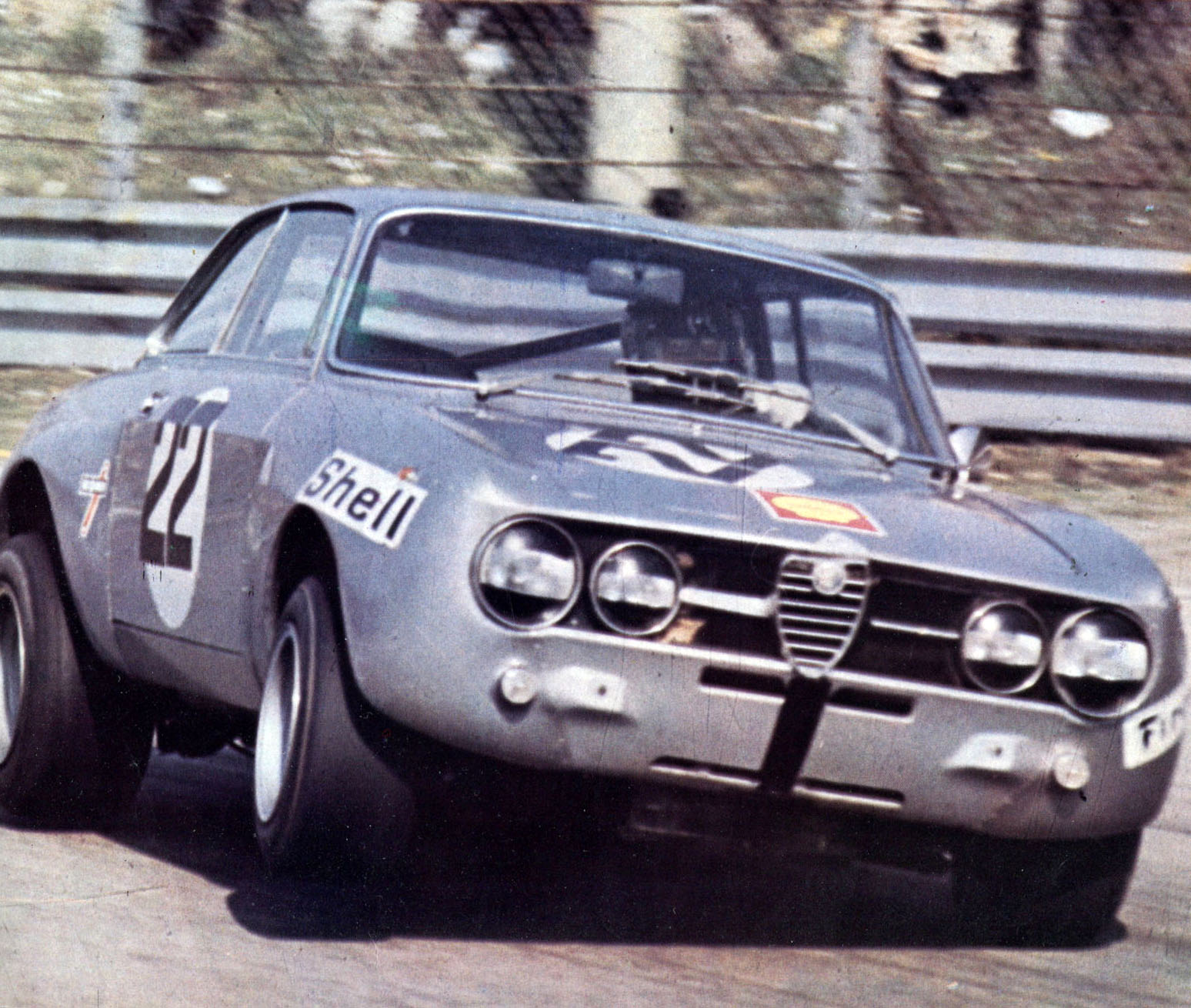
- de Adamich in 1972
- Born: Andrea Lodovico de Adamich; 3 October 1941; Trieste, Italy
- Died: 5 November 2025 (aged 84)

Formula One World Championship career
- Nationality: (Italy) Italian
- Active years: 1968, 1970–1973
- Team(s): Ferrari, McLaren, March, Surtees, Brabham
- Entries: 36 (30 starts)
- Championships: 0
- Wins: 0
- Podiums: 0
- Career points: 6
- Pole positions: 0
- Fastest laps: 0
- First entry: 1968 South African Grand Prix
- Last entry: 1973 British Grand Prix

Andrea Lodovico de Adamich (3 October 1941 – 5 November 2025) was an Italian racing driver. He participated in 34 World Championship Formula One Grands Prix, making his championship debut at the 1968 South African Grand Prix with Scuderia Ferrari. Driving for multiple other teams in the early 1970s, de Adamich scored a total of six points throughout his Formula One career. He also competed in endurance racing, and went on to become a TV pundit and commentator after his retirement from motorsport.

== Career ==
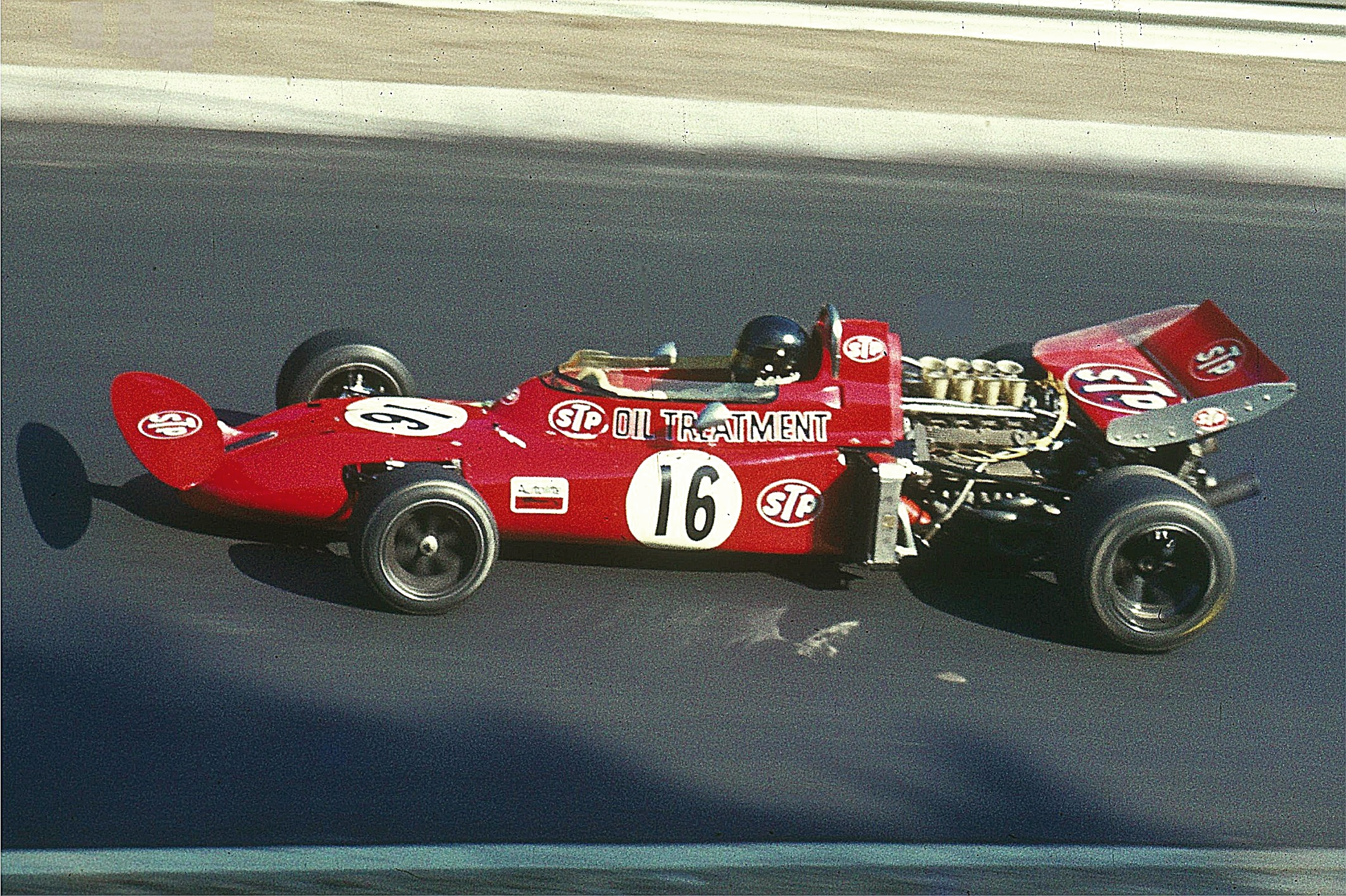
De Adamich driving for March in the 1971 German Grand Prix

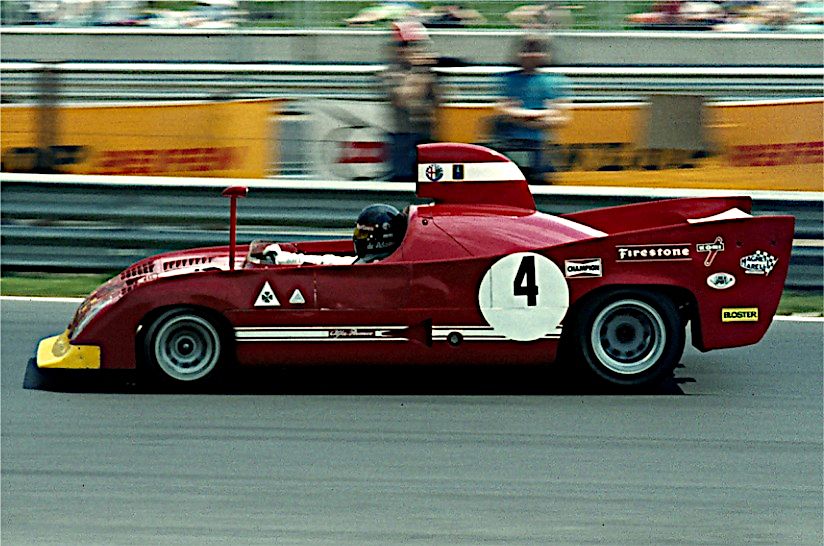
De Adamich 1974 at Nürburgring driving Alfa Romeo 33 TT 12

=== Early career ===
De Adamich was born on 3 October 1941 in Trieste, Italy. After acquiring interest in motorsport due to being gifted a Triumph TR3 by his mother, he started his racing career while doing hillclimbs and Formula Junior, later transitioning into touring and sportscars. In 1965, he won the Italian Formula Three Championship, and in 1966 and 1967, he won the European Touring Car Championship with Alfa Romeo, driving a 1600 GTA. In 1968, he won the Temporada Formula Two Championship in Argentina.

=== Formula One ===
After previously competing at the non-championship 1967 Spanish Grand Prix, de Adamich made his Formula One championship debut at the 1968 South African Grand Prix with Scuderia Ferrari alongside Chris Amon and Jacky Ickx. His season was cut short due to a heavy accident during a practice session for the 1968 Race of Champions; the accident led him to fall out of team owner Enzo Ferrari's favour.

For the 1970 season, de Adamich moved to McLaren, driving with an Alfa Romeo engine. The Cosworth engine at the time was more dominant, and de Adamich's move to March (who also used Alfa Romeo engines) in 1971 led to similar results. He joined Surtees for the 1972 season, and scored his first Formula One points when he finished fourth in the Spanish Grand Prix.

In 1973, de Adamich moved to Brabham. After a promising start of the season, when he finished fourth in the Belgian Grand Prix at Zolder, de Adamich's career was ended abruptly due to injuries sustained in a multiple-car pile-up at the British Grand Prix. The accident happened on the first lap, and de Adamich suffered from serious leg injuries as a result.

=== Endurance racing ===
De Adamich also competed in endurance racing, winning two races in the 1971 World Sportscar Championship behind the wheel of an Alfa Romeo T33/3, winning at Brands Hatch with Henri Pescarolo and at Watkins Glen with Ronnie Peterson. He finished in fourth at the 1972 24 Hours of Le Mans alongside Nino Vaccarella. De Adamich retired from racing in 1974.

=== Later career ===
Following his retirement, de Adamich became a TV pundit and commentator in his native Italy. From 1978 through 2012, he hosted the TV sport program Grand Prix on Mediaset's Italia 1, and served as Italy's Formula One commentator from 1991 until 1996. He played an important role in Alfa Romeo affiliated racing company N.Technology, helping earn them big success in touring car racing in the 2000s. De Adamich helped create the Centro Internazionale Guida Sicura, an organization that helps promote safe driving. Also, he had commercial ventures with Marlboro.

== Personal life ==
In 2022, de Adamich was awarded as a Commendatore of the Order of Merit of the Italian Republic.

De Adamich was married and had three children. He died on 5 November 2025 at the age of 84.

Andrea's son Gordon de Adamich, born in 1973, was also a racing driver, competing in the 1996 Italian Superturismo Championship.

== Racing record ==
=== Complete European Formula Two Championship results ===
(key)

Year	Entrant	Chassis	Engine	1	2	3	4	5	6	7	8	9	10	11	12	13	14	15	16	17	Pos.	Pts
1967	Lola Racing	Lola T100	Ford	SNE	SIL	NÜR	HOC	TUL	JAR	ZAN	PER; NC	BRH	VAL								NC	0
1968	Scuderia Ferrari	Ferrari 166	Ferrari	HOC	THR	JAR	PAL	TUL	ZAN	PER	HOC	VAL; 2									10th	6
1969	Roy Winkelmann Racing	Lotus 59	Ford	THR	HOC	NÜR	JAR	TUL	PER	VAL; 7											NC	0
1970	Scuderia Jolly Club	Brabham BT30	Ford	THR	HOC	BAR	ROU; 14	PER	TUL	IMO	HOC										NC	0
1972	Team Surtees	Surtees TS10	Ford	MAL	THR	HOC	PAU; Ret	PAL; DNS	HOC	ROU	ÖST; Ret	IMO; 4	MAN	PER; Ret	SAL	ALB	HOC; 17				19th	4
1973	Fina	Brabham BT40	Ford	MAL	HOC	THR	NÜR	PAU	KIN	NIV; Ret	HOC; Ret	ROU	MNZ	MAN	KAR	PER	SAL	NOR	ALB	VAL	NC	0

=== Complete Formula One World Championship results ===
(key)

Year	Entrant	Chassis	Engine	1	2	3	4	5	6	7	8	9	10	11	12	13	14	15	WDC	Pts
1968	Scuderia Ferrari	Ferrari 312/67	Ferrari 242 3.0 V12	RSA; Ret	ESP	MON	BEL	NED	FRA	GBR	GER	ITA	CAN	USA	MEX				NC	0
1970	Bruce McLaren Motor Racing	McLaren M7D	Alfa Romeo T33 3.0 V8	RSA	ESP; DNQ	MON; DNQ	BEL		FRA; NC	GBR; DNS									NC	0
1970	Bruce McLaren Motor Racing	McLaren M14D	Alfa Romeo T33 3.0 V8					NED; DNQ			GER; DNQ	AUT; 12	ITA; 8	CAN; Ret	USA; DNQ	MEX			NC	0
1971	STP March	March 711	Alfa Romeo T33 3.0 V8	RSA; 13	ESP; Ret	MON	NED	FRA; Ret	GBR; NC	GER; Ret	AUT	ITA; Ret	CAN	USA; 11					NC	0
1972	Ceramica Pagnossin Team Surtees	Surtees TS9B	Ford Cosworth DFV 3.0 V8	ARG; Ret	RSA; NC	ESP; 4	MON; 7	BEL; Ret	FRA; 14	GBR; Ret	GER; 13	AUT; 14	ITA; Ret	CAN; Ret	USA; Ret				17th	3
1973	Ceramica Pagnossin Team Surtees	Surtees TS9B	Ford Cosworth DFV 3.0 V8	ARG	BRA	RSA; 8													16th	3
1973	Ceramica Pagnossin Team MRD	Brabham BT37	Ford Cosworth DFV 3.0 V8				ESP; Ret	BEL; 4	MON; 7	SWE	FRA; Ret								16th	3
1973	Ceramica Pagnossin Team MRD	Brabham BT42	Ford Cosworth DFV 3.0 V8									GBR; Ret	NED	GER	AUT	ITA	CAN	USA	16th	3

=== Non-championship Formula One results ===
(key)

Year	Entrant	Chassis	Engine	1	2	3	4	5	6
1967	Scuderia Ferrari	Ferrari 312/67	Ferrari 242 3.0 V12	ROC	SPC	INT	SYR	OUL	ESP; 9
1968	Scuderia Ferrari	Ferrari 312/67	Ferrari 242 3.0 V12	ROC; DNS	INT	OUL			
1969	Team Surtees	Surtees TS5	Chevrolet 5.0 V8	ROC	INT	MAD	OUL; 3		
1972	Ceramica Pagnossin Team Surtees	Surtees TS9B	Ford Cosworth DFV 3.0 V8	ROC	BRA	INT	OUL	REP; 2	VIC; 3

=== Complete European F5000 Championship results ===
(key) (Races in bold indicate pole position; races in italics indicate fastest lap.)

Year	Entrant	Chassis	Engine	1	2	3	4	5	6	7	8	9	10	11	12	Pos.	Pts
1969	Team Surtees	Surtees TS5	Chevrolet 5.0 V8	OUL; DNS	BRH; 7	BRH; 12	MAL; 4	SIL; DNS	MON; 13	**KOK**; 4	ZAN	SNE	HOC	OUL	BRH	12th	625

=== Complete 24 Hours of Le Mans results ===
Year	Team	Co-Drivers	Car	Class	Laps	Pos.	Class Pos.
1970	(Italy) Autodelta SpA	(United Kingdom) Piers Courage	Alfa Romeo 33/3	P 3.0	222	DNF	DNF
1972	(Italy) Autodelta SpA	(Italy) Nino Vaccarella	Alfa Romeo 33/3	S 3.0	307	4th	4th

Sporting positions
Preceded by "Geki"	Italian Formula Three Champion; 1965	Succeeded by Ernesto Brambilla
Preceded by John Whitmore	European Touring Car Championship; Div.2 Champion; 1966–1967	Succeeded by John Rhodes
