= Robert Lamplough =

- Born: 4 June 1940 (age 86); Gloucester, Gloucestershire, England, UK

Formula One World Championship career
- Nationality: (United Kingdom) British
- Active years: 1967–71
- Team(s): non-works Lotus, Brabham, BRM, Lola
- Entries: 4 non-Championship races
- Championships: 0
- Wins: 0
- Podiums: 0
- Career points: 0
- Pole positions: 0
- Fastest laps: 0
- First entry: 1967 Spanish Grand Prix
- Last entry: 1971 Jochen Rindt Gedächtnisrennen

Robert "Robs" Lamplough (born 4 June 1940) is a British aviator and former racing driver from England. He participated in four Formula One non-Championship Grands Prix, but did not race in any World Championship events. He also competed in Formula Two, and formerly competed in historic racing events.

Lamplough also collected and flew aircraft.

== Racing record ==
=== Complete European Formula Two Championship results ===
(key)

Year	Entrant	Chassis	Engine	1	2	3	4	5	6	7	8	9	10	Pos.	Pts
1967	Frank Manning Racing	Lola T62	Lotus LF 1.6 L4	SNE; DNQ	SIL; 14	NÜR	HOC; NC	TUL	JAR; 12	ZAN; 10	PER	BRH; DSQ		NC	0
1967	Frank Manning Racing	Brabham BT21A	Lotus LF 1.6 L4										VAL; 12	NC	0
1968	Robert Lamplough	McLaren M4A	Ford Cosworth FVA 1.6 L4	HOC; Ret	THR; 12	JAR								NC	0
1968	Frank Manning Racing	McLaren M4A	Ford Cosworth FVA 1.6 L4				PAL; DNQ	TUL	ZAN; DNQ	PER	HOC; NC	VAL; DNQ		NC	0
1970	Robert Lamplough	Lola T100	Ford Cosworth FVA 1.6 L4	THR; Ret	HOC; DNS	BAR	ROU	PER	TUL	IMO	HOC; Ret			NC	0

=== Non-championship Formula One results ===
(key)

Year	Entrant	Chassis	Engine	1	2	3	4	5	6	7	8
1967	Frank Manning Racing	Brabham BT21A (F2)	Lotus LF 1.6 L4	ROC	SPR	INT	SYR	OUL	ESP; Ret		
1969	Robert Lamplough	Lotus 43 (F5000)	Ford 4.7 V8	ROC	INT	MAD; Ret	OUL				
1971	Robert Lamplough	Lola T102 (F5000)	Ford Boss 302 4.9 V8	ARG	ROC	QUE	SPR	INT; Ret			
1971	R. Lamplough Racing	BRM P133	BRM P142 3.0 V12						RIN; 12	OUL	VIC

=== Complete European F5000 Championship results ===
(key)

Year	Entrant	Chassis	Engine	1	2	3	4	5	6	7	8	9	10	11	12	13	14	15	16	17	Pos.	Pts
1969	Robert Lamplough	Lotus 43	Ford 4.7 V8	OUL; 11	BRH; 4				MON; 15	KOK	ZAN	SNE	HOC; 12	OUL	BRH						10th	785
1969	Robert Lamplough	Lotus 41C	Ford 116E 1.6 L4			BRH; 5	MAL; 7	SIL; 5													10th	785
1969	Doug Hardwick	Lola T142	Chevrolet 5.0 V8					SIL; DNS													10th	785
1971	Robert Lamplough	Lola T102	Ford Boss 302 4.9 V8	MAL	SNE	BRH	MON	SIL; Ret	CAS; Ret	MAL	MNZ	MAL	THR	SIL	OUL	SNE	HOC; Ret	OUL	BRH	BRH	NC	0
