= Peter Gethin =

British racing driver (1940–2011)

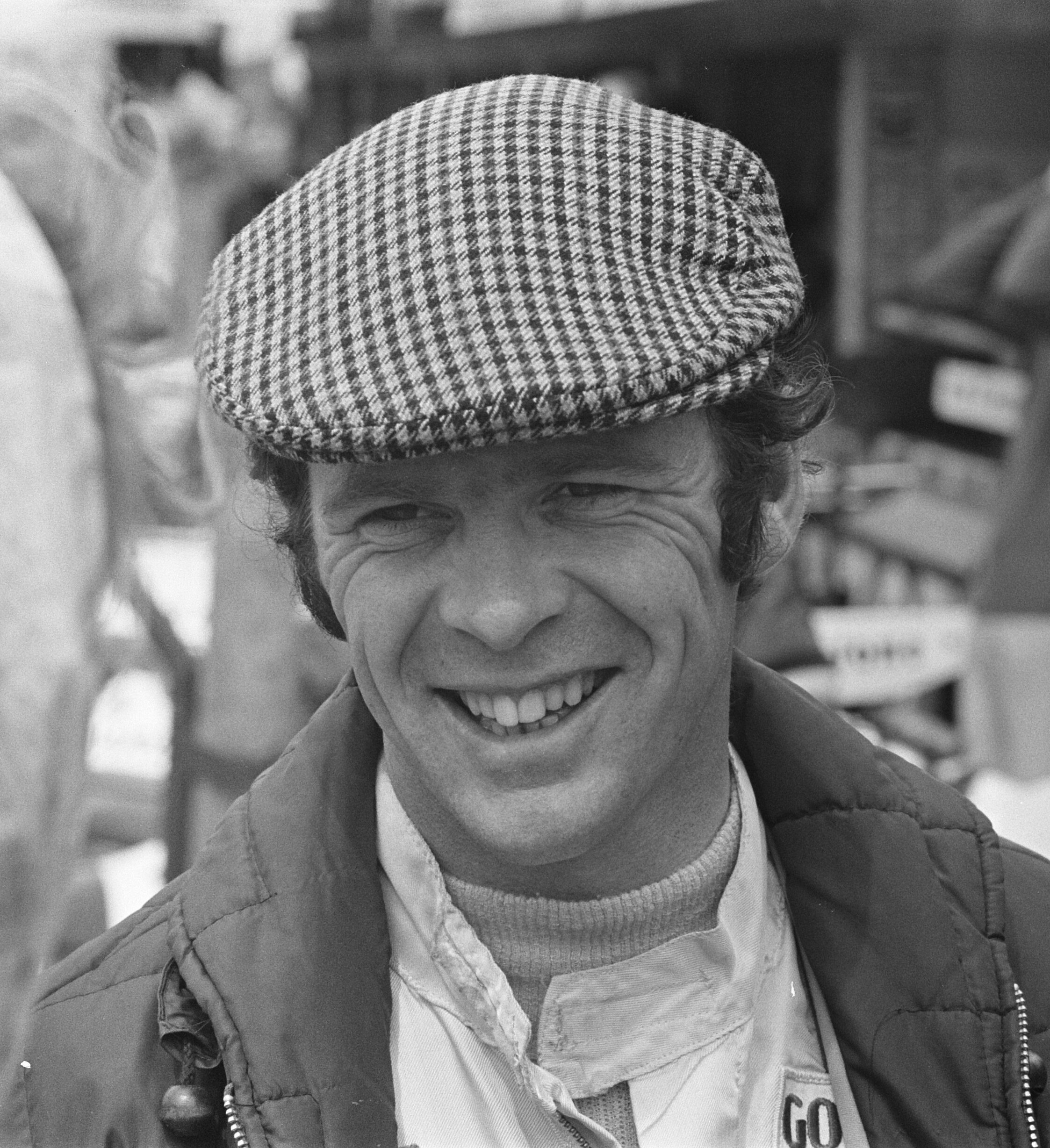
- Gethin at the 1971 Dutch Grand Prix
- Born: Peter Kenneth Gethin; 21 February 1940; Ewell, Surrey, England
- Died: 5 December 2011 (aged 71); Haslemere, Surrey, England

Formula One World Championship career
- Nationality: (United Kingdom) British
- Active years: 1970–1974
- Team(s): McLaren, BRM, Hill
- Entries: 31 (30 starts)
- Championships: 0
- Wins: 1
- Podiums: 1
- Career points: 11
- Pole positions: 0
- Fastest laps: 0
- First entry: 1970 Dutch Grand Prix
- First win: 1971 Italian Grand Prix
- Last entry: 1974 British Grand Prix

Peter Kenneth Gethin (21 February 1940 – 5 December 2011) was a British racing driver and motorsport executive who competed in Formula One from 1970 to 1974. Gethin won the 1971 Italian Grand Prix with BRM.

Born and raised in Surrey, Gethin started his career in sportscar racing, competing in the British Sports Car Championship as a privateer until 1965. He progressed to Formula Three the following year, competing in the French and British Championships before graduating to Formula Two. Gethin won several titles in Formula 5000, prompting McLaren to sign him in 1970 to replace the deceased Bruce McLaren. After retaining his seat for 1971, Gethin moved to BRM from the Austrian Grand Prix onwards, winning the following race in Italy with an average speed of 242.615 km/h (150.754 mph), a record which stood for 32 years.

Gethin remained at BRM in 1972 but was dropped at the end of the season, only making one-off appearances for BRM and Hill in 1973 and 1974, respectively. In addition to his victory in Italy, he won two non-championship races, including the 1973 Race of Champions with Chevron. He returned to European Formula 5000 upon his departure, twice finishing runner-up in 1974 and 1975, amongst winning the Tasman Series during the former. After competing in the 1974 World Sportscar Championship, driving the Chevron B26, Gethin further finished runner-up in the Canadian-American Challenge Cup and the Rothmans International Series in 1977, before retiring at the end of the season.

Upon retiring from motor racing, Gethin founded Peter Gethin Racing in 1986, a Formula 3000 team. He was the director of the British Racing Drivers' Club from 2005 until 2008.

== Career ==
=== McLaren driver ===
==== 1970 ====
Gethin made his debut in F1 for McLaren at the 1970 Dutch Grand Prix, replacing the team's founder, Bruce McLaren, who had been killed at the Goodwood Circuit earlier in the month. He joined a three car team which also included Andrea de Adamich and Dan Gurney. He qualified strongly at Zandvoort, taking 11th, 2.110s behind Jochen Rindt's pole time for Lotus. He was nine-tenths of a second ahead of his more illustrious but ageing teammate Gurney. He engaged in a good fight early in the race with Henri Pescarolo's Matra, but soon got the better of the Frenchman and was still running in tenth when he had an accident on lap 19.

Gethin missed the French and British Grands Prix, as former McLaren legend and 1967 world champion Denny Hulme drove the car, but he returned for the German Grand Prix. He qualified less impressively, being only 17th, and a tenth of a second behind Hulme, who had remained with the team on Gethin's return at the expense of Gurney. Gethin dropped to the back early on and retired after just three laps with a throttle failure.

The Austrian Grand Prix at the Österreichring was next, and it was another disappointing qualifying session for Gethin, who was down in 21st and comprehensively trounced by his teammates Hulme and de Adamich. As other drivers fell by the wayside in the race, however, Gethin climbed consistently up the order, and was running as high as 8th before he was passed by Ignazio Giunti's Ferrari and Jo Siffert's March late on, but it was his first grand prix finish as he came home tenth.

Gethin was again the rearmost of the McLaren cars at Monza for the Italian Grand Prix, but it was an improved performance, as he was 17th and as close as he had been to the pole time, 2.050 seconds behind Jacky Ickx's Ferrari. He started well in the race and was quickly up to 13th after good passes on teammate de Adamich and Ronnie Peterson's March. However, both Gethin and de Adamich soon suffered technical problems, and dropped to the back of the field, where they would stay until the end of the race, apart from brief periods ahead of Giunti and Tim Schenken's De Tomaso when they were experiencing their own problems. Due to the sheer attrition of the race, de Adamich was eighth at the end and Gethin 9th, although the Englishman was eight laps down and therefore not classified.

The Canadian Grand Prix at Mont-Tremblant saw the season leave Europe and head towards its finale in the Americas, and it saw a resurgence in Gethin's form, as he out-qualified both de Adamich and Hulme, coming 11th just 1.7 seconds behind Jackie Stewart's pole time. He played the race strategy well, and did not have to make any moves on the track, save one against Pescarolo. He was behind Hulme for a while, but the Kiwi retired with wheel problems. This left Gethin free to take sixth and his first points in F1.

Hoping to continue this form, they arrived in Watkins Glen for the United States Grand Prix. It appeared that Gethin's Canada pace had not been carried over, as he was back behind Hulme and in 21st on the grid, 3.05 seconds behind Ickx on pole, although he was ahead of de Adamich. He raced strongly in the first half of the race, crucially getting ahead of the Brabhams of Jack Brabham and Rolf Stommelen, but both were able to pass him before too long. Tim Schenken and Clay Regazzoni, who was recovering from technical problems, also exposed his deficiencies in racecraft, leaving him 14th and last, and this was where he finished, 8 laps down on winner Emerson Fittipaldi in the Lotus.

The season concluded with the Mexican Grand Prix at the Autódromo Hermanos Rodríguez in Mexico City, and Gethin was back on form, qualifying a season best tenth, over half a second ahead of Hulme. He raced strongly again, keeping the faster car of 1964 world champion John Surtees, in the car bearing his name, behind for a number of laps. However, the McLaren's reliability issues reared their ugly head again, and he slowed and finally stopped with engine failure on lap 28.

The season ended with Gethin in 23rd in the world championship, with just 1 solitary point earned in Canada.

==== 1971 ====
Gethin remained with McLaren for 1971, in a team now reduced to two cars, with Gethin partnering Hulme for another year. The first qualifying session at Kyalami went badly for the Englishman, who finished the session 11th, half a second behind his more illustrious teammate and 1.8 seconds behind pole man Jackie Stewart, driving for Tyrrell. In a race where Hulme was only denied victory by suspension problems four laps from the end, Gethin dropped back very quickly and retired just seven laps in with a fuel leak.

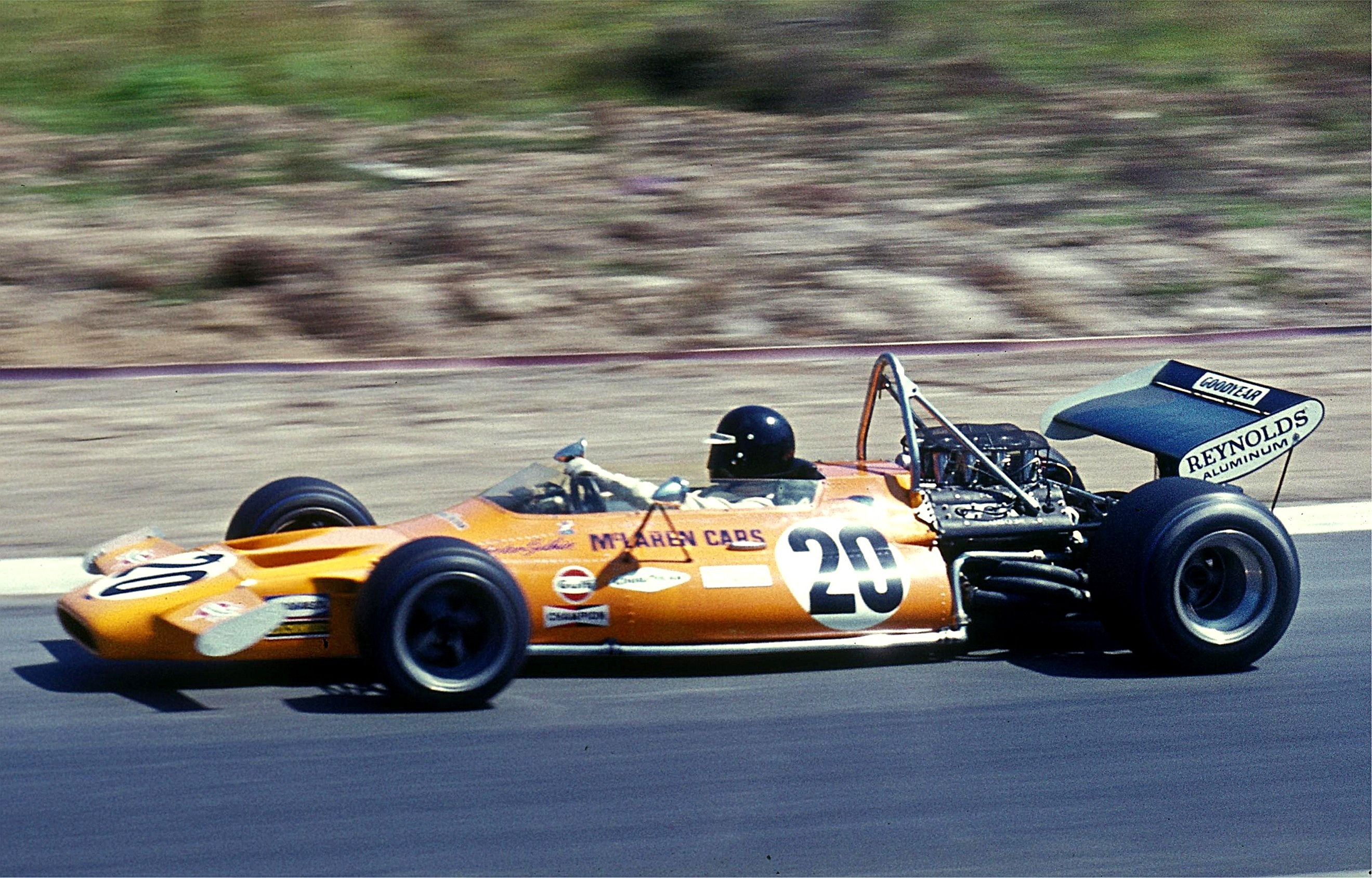
Peter Gethin during practice of the 1971 German Grand Prix.

The Montjuïc Circuit was the venue for the Spanish Grand Prix, which was next on the calendar. Gethin qualified a career best seventh, only 0.9 seconds behind Jacky Ickx's Ferrari on pole and over three-tenths ahead of Hulme. He fast dropped behind Hulme and the second Ferrari of Mario Andretti, and when things straightened out he was down in tenth, behind François Cevert's Tyrrell and the Lotus of Emerson Fittipaldi as well. However, the retirements of Andretti and Fittipaldi left him eighth, which is where he finished the race – depressingly he had been comfortably outperformed by Hulme, who had taken fifth.

Gethin's first appearance at Monaco which was the next challenge, and Gethin did not impress in qualifying, being down in 14th, 1.6 seconds behind Hulme and almost four seconds behind Stewart's pole time. He dropped a further place on the first lap, to Rolf Stommelen's Surtees. He gradually gained places, however, due to others' retirements and a good overtake on John Surtees. He ran as high as 11th before he hit the barriers on lap 23.

Gethin won the 1971 Italian Grand Prix with the fastest average speed in Formula One history (until the record was broken by Michael Schumacher in the same race in 2003), but this was his only podium finish. There was only 0.01 seconds between him and second placed Ronnie Peterson, also a record. Indeed, he never led an entire lap of Formula One racing, as he passed from fourth to first in the last lap.

== Death ==
Gethin died at the age of 71 in December 2011 after a long illness.

== Racing record ==
=== Complete European Formula Two Championship results ===
(key) (Races in bold indicate pole position; races in italics indicate fastest lap.)

Year	Entrant	Chassis	Engine	1	2	3	4	5	6	7	8	9	10	11	12	13	14	15	16	17	Pos.	Pts
1967	Gerard-Cooper Racing	Cooper T82	Ford	SNE	SIL	NÜR; 14	HOC	TUL	JAR	ZAN	PER	BRH	VAL								NC	0
1968	Frank Lythgoe Racing	Chevron B10	Ford	HOC; Ret	THR; Ret	JAR	PAL; DNS	TUL													12th	4
1968	Frank Lythgoe Racing	Brabham BT23C	Ford						ZAN; Ret	PER; 13	HOC; NC	VAL; 3									12th	4
1972	Chevron Racing Cars	Chevron B20	Ford	MAL; DSQ	THR; Ret	HOC	**PAU**; 1	PAL	HOC; Ret	ROU; DNS	ÖST; Ret	IMO; Ret	**MAN**; Ret	PER	SAL; 5	ALB	HOC; Ret				9th	12
1973	Chevron Racing Cars	Chevron B25	Ford	MAL; DNS	HOC; Ret	THR; Ret	NÜR	PAU	KIN	NIV; Ret	HOC	ROU; DNS	MNZ	MAN	**KAR**; 2	PER	SAL	NOR	ALB; 14	VAL	13th	6

=== Complete British Saloon Car Championship results ===
(key) (Races in bold indicate pole position; races in italics indicate fastest lap.)

Year	Team	Car	Class	1	2	3	4	5	6	7	8	9	10	DC	Pts	Class
1967	Robert Ashcroft	Ford Falcon Sprint	D	BRH	SNE	SIL	SIL	MAL	SIL	SIL; 7	BRH	OUL	BRH	31st	2	9th

=== Complete European F5000 Championship results ===
(key) (Races in bold indicate pole position; races in italics indicate fastest lap.)

Year	Entrant	Chassis	Engine	1	2	3	4	5	6	7	8	9	10	11	12	13	14	15	16	17	18	19	20	Pos.	Pts
1969	Church Farm Racing	McLaren M10A	Chevrolet 5.0 V8	OUL; 1	**BRH**; 1	BRH; 1	**MAL**; 1	**SIL**; 16	MON	KOK	ZAN	SNE	**HOC**; 4	OUL; 14	**BRH**; 13									1st	2365
1970	Sid Taylor Racing	McLaren M10B	Chevrolet 5.0 V8	**OUL**; 2	**BRH**; 1	**ZOL**; 1	ZAN; 1	**SIL**; Ret	BRH; 1	**CAS**; 1	**MAL**; 1	MON; 2	**SIL**; 1	MNZ	AND; 1	**SAL**; Ret	THR; 2	SIL	OUL	SNE	HOC	OUL	BRH	1st	90
1971	Sid Taylor Racing	McLaren M18	Chevrolet 5.0 V8	MAL	SNE	BRH	MON	SIL	**CAS**; 2	MAL; 6	MNZ	MAL	THR	SIL	OUL	SNE	HOC	OUL	BRH	BRH				12th	7
1973	Chevron Racing Cars	Chevron B24	Chevrolet 5.0 V8	**BRH**; 1	MAL; 4	SIL	SNE	BRH					MON; Ret	SIL; C	**BRH**; Ret	**OUL**; 1	JYL	ZAN	SNE; Ret	BRH; Ret				8th	65
1973	Anglo-American Racing Team	Chevron B24	Chevrolet 5.0 V8						OUL; 2	MAL	MIS	MAL												8th	65
1974	Chevron Racing Team V.D.S.	Chevron B28	Chevrolet 5.0 V8	**BRH**; 1	MAL; Ret	**SIL**; 2	OUL; Ret	BRH; 4	ZOL; 1	THR; 2	ZAN; 1	MUG; Ret	**MNZ**; 1	MAL; 2	MON; Ret	THR; 2	BRH; Ret	OUL; Ret	SNE; NC	MAL; 3	BRH; 3			2nd	186
1975	Racing Team V.D.S.	Lola T400	Chevrolet 5.0 V8	BRH; Ret	OUL; NC	BRH; Ret	SIL; 4	ZOL; 1	ZAN; 1	THR; 6	SNE; 2	MAL; 4	THR; Ret	BRH; 6	OUL; 4	SIL; Ret	SNE; Ret	MAL; 6	**BRH**; 1					2nd	143

=== Complete Formula One World Championship results ===
(key)

Year	Entrant	Chassis	Engine	1	2	3	4	5	6	7	8	9	10	11	12	13	14	15	WDC	Pts
1970	Bruce McLaren Motor Racing	McLaren M14A	Ford Cosworth DFV 3.0 V8	RSA	ESP	MON	BEL	NED; Ret	FRA	GBR	GER; Ret	AUT; 10	ITA; NC	CAN; 6	USA; 14	MEX; Ret			23rd	1
1971	Bruce McLaren Motor Racing	McLaren M14A	Ford Cosworth DFV 3.0 V8	RSA; Ret	ESP; 8	MON; Ret													9th	9
1971	Bruce McLaren Motor Racing	McLaren M19A	Ford Cosworth DFV 3.0 V8				NED; NC	FRA; 9	GBR; Ret	GER; Ret									9th	9
1971	Yardley Team BRM	BRM P160	BRM P142 3.0 V12								AUT; 10	ITA; 1	CAN; 14	USA; 9					9th	9
1972	Marlboro BRM	BRM P160B	BRM P142 3.0 V12	ARG; Ret	RSA; NC		MON; Ret	BEL; Ret	FRA; DNS	GBR; Ret	GER								21st	1
1972	Marlboro BRM	BRM P180	BRM P142 3.0 V12			ESP; Ret													21st	1
1972	Marlboro BRM	BRM P160C	BRM P142 3.0 V12									AUT; 13	ITA; 6	CAN; Ret	USA; Ret				21st	1
1973	Marlboro BRM	BRM P160E	BRM P142 3.0 V12	ARG	BRA	RSA	ESP	BEL	MON	SWE	FRA	GBR	NED	GER	AUT	ITA	CAN; Ret	USA	NC	0
1974	Embassy Racing with Graham Hill	Lola T370	Ford Cosworth DFV 3.0 V8	ARG	BRA	RSA	ESP	BEL	MON	SWE	NED	FRA	GBR; Ret	GER	AUT	ITA	CAN	USA	NC	0

=== Non-championship results ===
(key) (Races in bold indicate pole position; races in italics indicate fastest lap.)

Year	Entrant	Chassis	Engine	1	2	3	4	5	6	7	8
1968	Frank Lythgoe Racing	Brabham BT21 (F2)	BMW M12 2.0 L4	ROC; NC	INT	OUL					
1969	Church Farm Racing Team	McLaren M10A (F5000)	Chevrolet 5.0 V8	ROC	INT	**MAD**; 2	OUL				
1970	Bruce McLaren Motor Racing	McLaren M7A	Ford Cosworth DFV 3.0 V8	ROC; 6							
1970	Sid Taylor Racing	McLaren M10B (F5000)	Chevrolet 5.0 V8		INT; 16	OUL					
1971	Bruce McLaren Motor Racing	McLaren M14A	Ford Cosworth DFV 3.0 V8	ARG	ROC; Ret	QUE; 8	SPR; 2	INT; 2	RIN; Ret		
1971	Yardley Team BRM	BRM P160	BRM P142 3.0 V12							**OUL**; Ret	VIC; 1
1972	Marlboro BRM	BRM P160B	BRM P142 3.0 V12	ROC; 4	BRA; Ret	INT; 6	**OUL**; Ret	REP; Ret			
1972	Marlboro BRM	BRM P160C	BRM P142 3.0 V12						VIC; 5		
1973	Chevron Racing Cars	Chevron B24 (F5000)	Chevrolet 5.0 V8	ROC; 1	INT						
1974	Chevron Racing Team V.D.S.	Chevron B28 (F5000)	Chevrolet 5.0 V8	PRE	ROC; 10	INT; 7					
1975	Racing Team V.D.S.	Lola T400 (F5000)	Chevrolet 5.0 V8	ROC; DNQ	INT	SUI					

== See also ==
- Formula One drivers from the United Kingdom

Sporting positions
Preceded by Inaugural	European Formula 5000 Championship; Champion; 1969–1970	Succeeded by Frank Gardner
Preceded by Emerson Fittipaldi	Brands Hatch Race of Champions; Winner; 1973	Succeeded by Jacky Ickx
Preceded by Graham McRae	Tasman Series; Champion; 1974	Succeeded by Warwick Brown
