= Surtees TS5 =

Formula 5000 racing car

The Surtees TS5 was a Formula 5000 racing car, designed, developed, and built by Surtees between 1969 and 1970.

== Development history ==
The construction of the TS5 went back to an initiative by British racing car designer Roger Nathan. Nathan, who had developed a racing sports car under the name Costin Nathan together with Frank Costin in the second half of the 1960s, was looking for partners at the end of 1968 to develop a Formula 5000 racing car. Nathan wanted to enter this newly created racing series and needed a usable racing vehicle. He approached British racing car engineer Len Terry, who agreed to design a car. Terry made himself known primarily as the designer of the successful Lotus - Monoposto 33 and 38 made a name. He spent the year 1968 at Lola to develop the Formula 2 BMW T102 there. The third person involved was the former motorcycle and Formula One world champion, John Surtees. In 1968 Surtees was still a very active racing driver. He was a works driver for Honda and finished the Formula 1 Drivers' World Championship in seventh place overall.

Parallel to his commitments as a driver, Surtees had long since started to set up his own racing team, Team Surtees. After Nathan, Terry, and Surtees, the fourth participant in this project appeared at the end of 1968 with the American actor James Garner. Garner maintained a racing team under the name American International Racers and was looking for a vehicle to compete in the US Formula A series, the local counterpart to the British Formula 5000.

Terry designed and built the first four chassis in his small workshop in Poole, with logistical support from Surtees. Originally, the vehicles were to receive the designation Terry-Surtees TS5 for Formula 5000 and Garner TS5 for Formula A. But funding stalled, Nathan dropped out of the project and Garner had already sold his Lola T70 and CanAm - Lola T162 to fund his part of the project. It was only when John Surtees took over the project that the process got a reasonable technical and financial basis. Terry's four chassis were completed at the Surtees factory and three other cars were built entirely there.

In his design, Terry followed the slim construction that was already used in the Lotus 38. The race car had a monocoque, independent suspension, and a Hewland L.G.500 transmission. A 500 hp 5-liter V8 engine from Ford was originally intended as the engine. In the winter of 1968/1969, Garner team pilot Scooter Patrick took over the test drives with the prototype. When the two Garner TS5 were handed over to the Americans in March 1969, they equipped the car with Chevrolet V8 engines, which subsequently remained the main engines of this racing car. More test drives at Riverside were unpleasant. Scooter Patrick and Dave Jordan - who did the testing - complained about the poor handling of the cars. In addition, there were constant problems with the suspensions, which prompted James Garner to also get out of the project. The vehicles returned to England and the actor commissioned new racing vehicles from Dan Gurney's AAR Eagle.

In addition to building the remaining vehicles, John Surtees also took over their racing operations and renamed the vehicles Surtees TS5. Thus began the long typology of Surtees racing cars under the abbreviation TS for Team Surtees.

== Racing history ==
The TS5 made its racing debut in April 1969 at Oulton Park. It was the opening race of the 1969 European Formula 5000 Championship and also the first race in this newly established series. John Surtees had brought the Garner back to Europe and used the cars, still with Chevrolet engines, under his own team leadership. David Hobbs, Andrea de Adamich, and Trevor Taylor were committed as drivers. In contrast to the test experiences in the USA, the cars were fast in practice and did not have any technical problems. David Hobbs set the fastest lap time of 1:30.6 in qualifying and put his TS5 on pole position. Andrea de Adamich finished fourth in training but was unable to take part in the race because he had an accident just before the end of training and severely damaged his car. In the race, Hobbs only had to beat Peter Gethin in the McLaren M10A and achieved a podium finish in the first race.

At the third round of the season at Brands Hatch, there was the second pole position, this time secured by Trevor Taylor. A defective clutch also prevented its launch. Hobbs celebrated the first race victory at the sixth round of the season at Mondello Park, where he was waved off as the winner after 84 laps in front of Mike Hailwood in the Lola T142 and Alan Rollinson on a Brabham BT30.

A winning streak was followed by Trevor Taylor, who won back-to-back races at Koksijde, Zandvoort, Snetterton, and Hockenheim. However, he could not secure the overall ranking; this went to Peter Gethin, preferably by eliminating results from Taylor.

In 1970, the first win of the season was not until the ninth race, when Trevor Taylor won ahead of Peter Gethin in the revised McLaren M10 and Frank Gardner in the Lola T190. During the course of the season, Surtees withdrew from Formula 5000, since the entry into the Formula 1 World Championship was already pending, which required the full attention of the team. One car, a TS5A with chassis number 008, was sold to Irishman Alan Rollinson, who had little success with the car and switched to a Lotus 70 before the end of the season.

At the end of the year, all TS5 and TS5A were sold. Surtees re-entered the Formula 5000 championship as a factory in 1971 with the successor model, the TS8.

=== Formula A ===
The American racing driver Mike Goth acquired the TS5 with the chassis number 005 in the spring of 1969 and used it in the championship from the sixth race of the season at Elkhart Lake. Right at the debut race, which consisted of three sprint races and the resulting overall standings, he finished third behind Tony Adamowicz in the Eagle Mk5 and McLaren driver John Cordts. Surtees accepted the great logistical challenge and also entered works cars in Formula A. For this purpose, the vehicles had to be shipped again and again by air freight be transported back and forth between the UK and the US; this was also a not inconsiderable financial effort. In the same race as Goth, David Hobbs also started in the works car, but dropped out on the second lap due to a defect. After Hobbs then came second in the second race, the race at Lime Rock, and the third race, the Minnesota Grand Prix at Brainerd, saw the first race win for a TS5 in the USA. Four more wins of the season followed for Hobbs, including a double at Mont-Tremblant when he won ahead of Andrea de Adamich.

As in Europe, Surtees could not win the overall championship standings in the USA, despite strong races and successes that could be counted, since the team entered the series too late in the year and Tony Adamowicz's point advantage in the Eagle was therefore uncatchable.

In 1970, Surtees' involvement in the US factory ended.

== TS5 chassis ==
- Chassis TS5 001: The first TS5, still built by Len Terry; Trevor Taylor drove the car in 1969 in Formula 5000 and Andrea de Adamich in Formula A; destroyed in a 1969 Scooter Patrick accident at Mont-Tremblant.
- Chassis TS5 002: A Garner TS5 which was returned to Surtees by Garner after delivery; renamed Chassis F1R and sold to South African Doug Serrurier; Jackie Pretorius drove the car in South Africa; in the 1970s, the car was badly damaged in a drag race; A British collector found the car in a South African barn in 2003 and had it fully restored in Europe in 2005.
- Chassis TS5 003: Driven by David Hobbs in 1969 in Formula 5000 and Formula A; Sold to Royal American Competition late 1969; Hamilton Vose drove the car in Formula A; destroyed in an accident at Sears Point.
- Chassis TS5 004: Driven by David Hobbs, Trevor Taylor, and Andrea de Adamich in both Formula 5000 and Formula A in 1969; Sold to Royal American Competition late 1969; driven by Dick DeJarld; later became John Martin's TS5A.
- TS5 005 Chassis: Sold to Mike Goth in 1969; subsequently had several owners and was involved in a number of accidents; was later restored and is now owned by the American Rob van Westenberg.
- Chassis TS5 006: Originally built in 1969 for the Japanese Tetsu Ikuzawa, whose contract with Surtees did not materialize in 1969; Driven by Trevor Taylor and Derek Bell in Formula 5000 in 1969; sold to Sherwood Johnston in 1970; further whereabouts disputed.
- Chassis TS5 007: Hobbs and Taylor works car 1969; then sold to Robert Fischetti; Wrecked at Watkins Glen in 1972.

== Surtees TS5A ==
In 1970 the TS5 was revised and became the TS5A. There were detailed improvements to the suspensions, the fuel tanks, and the engine lubrication. The braking system was improved and switched from the LG500 to the Hewland DG300 gearbox. There is different information about the number of pieces produced. While John Surtees spoke of 15 vehicles built, only ten TS5A can be fixed despite the confusing chassis stories. The acquisition of a copy by the British racing car manufacturer Trojan is secured. The McLaren M10 was manufactured at Trojan and a TS5A served as a technological example. A completely impossible process today in racing car construction.

The TS5A was driven by various private drivers until the late 1970s. The American Howie Fairbanks drove a TS5A in 1978 in the SCCA series.

== TS5A chassis ==
If the assignment of the chassis numbers is easy with the TS5, this is much more difficult with the TS5A. This is mainly due to the lack of assignment of the cars delivered to Royal American Competition Enterprises Fred Opert Racing and Doug Hooper, which leads to great potential for confusion. Nevertheless, an attempt should be made here to assign the numbers.

- Chassis TS5A 001: works car at the beginning of 1970; driven by David Hobbs and Trevor Taylor; destroyed in an accident by Taylor in May 1970 at Brands Hatch.
- Chassis TS5A 002: one of the cars delivered to RACE, Opert, or Hooper; assignment unclear.
- Chassis TS5A 003: one of the cars delivered to RACE, Opert, or Hooper; assignment unclear.
- Chassis TS5A 004: one of the cars delivered to RACE, Opert, or Hooper; assignment unclear.
- Chassis TS5A 005: one of the cars delivered to RACE, Opert, or Hooper; assignment unclear.
- Chassis TS5A 006: sold in the USA in 1970; driven by John Gunn for Fred Opert in the Formula A Championship, later used by Luigi Chinetti in the 1971 Argentine Grand Prix; Driver Nestor Garcia-Veiga retired after a technical defect.
- Chassis TS5A 007: company car with an eventful history; Driven by David Hobbs in the USA in 1970; Awarded to Belgian racing driver Hervé Bayard in 1971; Sold to South African Eddie Keizan at the end of the year, who replaced the Chevrolet with a Ford engine; returned to Europe in the 1980s and is now owned by the German Franz Guggemos.
- Chassis TS5A 008: built in 1970 for Irish racing driver Allan Rollinson; partly also driven by Tony Trimmer; 1971 sold to Eddie Kiezen like 007; this sat both cars with different drivers in South African formula races; further whereabouts unknown.
- Chassis TS5A 009: Trevor Taylor works car in 1970; destroyed in an accident at the Salzburgring.
- Chassis TS5A 010: one of the cars delivered to RACE, Opert or Hooper; assignment unclear.

== Tasman Series ==
Mike Goth also contested the Tasman Series races of that year in January and February 1970 in his TS5, chassis 005. With ten points he finished eighth in the championship.
