= Teddy Pilette =

Belgian racing driver (born 1942)

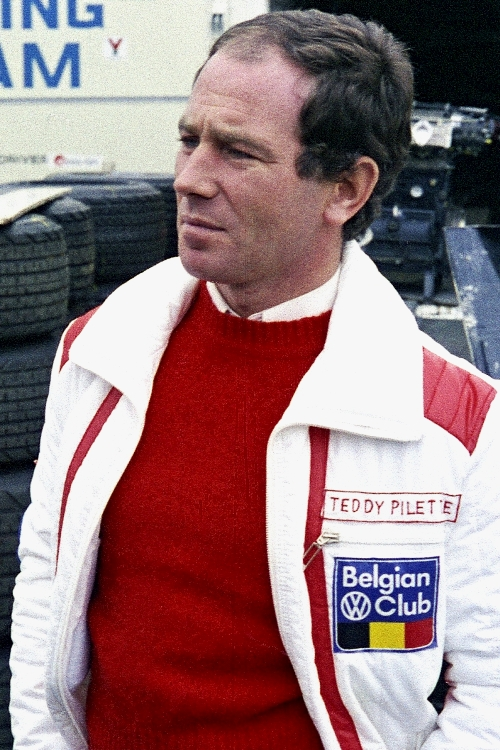
- Born: 26 July 1942 (age 84); Brussels, Belgium

Formula One World Championship career
- Nationality: (Belgium) Belgian
- Active years: 1974, 1977
- Team(s): Brabham, BRM
- Entries: 4 (1 start)
- Championships: 0
- Wins: 0
- Podiums: 0
- Career points: 0
- Pole positions: 0
- Fastest laps: 0
- First entry: 1974 Belgian Grand Prix
- Last entry: 1977 Italian Grand Prix

Theodore "Teddy" Pilette (French pronunciation: [te.ɔ.dɔʁ pi.lɛt]; born 26 July 1942) is a former racing driver from Belgium. He participated in four Formula One World Championship Grands Prix, the first on 12 May 1974 with Bernie Ecclestone's Brabham team.

== Career ==
Son of André Pilette and grandson of Théodore Pilette, he followed the family path. He started his career by winning many go-kart races before being sent to England to the talent-spotting Jim Russell Racing School. This experience created the opportunity for him to be part of the cast for John Frankenheimer's movie Grand Prix, and later on Le Mans with Steve McQueen.

On the circuit, Pilette raced for Carlo Abarth in 1963 and 1965, and in 1967 he started racing for the Belgian VDS Team. He won the European Formula 5000 Championship in 1973 with a Chevron B24, and again in 1975 with a Lola T400. He also competed in the US in Formula 5000. He also made 3 attempts at the Indy 500. He attempted to qualify for the 1977 Indianapolis 500 but failed to make the field. He drove in the CART Championship Car race at Watkins Glen International in 1981 but retired after 14 laps due to gearbox failure. It would be his only Champ Car start as he failed to qualify for the 1982 Indianapolis 500 and 1983 Indianapolis 500 and was entered in the Cleveland Grand Prix later that year but the car was driven by Herm Johnson.

In 1977, Capparelli arranged for Pilette to drive with the dying BRM team in Formula One, and also in the Aurora AFX Formula One Championship the following year.

In sports cars, Pilette won the Spa 24 Hours with a Ford Capri, in the last race on the long circuit in 1978.

In 1992, Pilette formed the Pilette Speed Tradition Formula Ford team in Europe. In 1994 he built his own Formula Three car, the Pilette PWT 94C, and raced in the German Formula 3 championship with Paolo Coloni, without success.

In September 2013, Pilette was elected vice president of the Grand Prix Drivers Club (formerly known as Club International des Anciens Pilotes de Grand-Prix F1).

== Racing record ==
=== Complete 24 Hours of Le Mans results ===
Year	Team	Co-drivers	Car	Class	Laps	Pos.	Class pos.
1968	(Belgium) Racing Team V.D.S.	(Netherlands) Rob Slotemaker	Alfa Romeo T33/2	P 2.0	104	DNF	DNF
1969	(Belgium) Racing Team V.D.S.	(Netherlands) Rob Slotemaker	Alfa Romeo T33B	P 3.0	36	DNF	DNF
1970	(Belgium) Racing Team V.D.S.	(Belgium) Gustave Gosselin	Lola T70 Mk. IIIB-Chevrolet	S 5.0	109	DNF	DNF
1971	(Belgium) Racing Team V.D.S.	(Belgium) Gustave Gosselin	Lola T70 Mk. IIIB-Chevrolet	S 5.0	14	DNF	DNF
1972	(Belgium) Ecurie Francorchamps	(United Kingdom) Derek Bell (United Kingdom) Richard Bond	Ferrari 365 GTB/4	GT; 5.0	301	8th	4th
1975	(Belgium) Ecurie Francorchamps	(France) Jean-Claude Andruet (Belgium) Hughes de Fierlandt	Ferrari 365 GTB/4	GTS	293	12th	6th
1978	(Belgium) Ecurie Francorchamps	(Belgium) Jean Blaton (France) Raymond Touroul	Ferrari 512BB	IMSA +2.5	39	DNF	DNF
1987	(Belgium) Dahm Cars Racing Team	(Germany) Peter Fritsch (Belgium) Jean-Paul Libert	Argo JM19-Porsche	C2	12	DNF	DNF

=== Complete European F5000 Championship/British Formula One Championship results ===
(key) (Races in bold indicate pole position; races in italics indicate fastest lap.)

Year	Entrant	Chassis	Engine	1	2	3	4	5	6	7	8	9	10	11	12	13	14	15	16	17	18	Pos.	Pts
1971	Racing Team V.D.S.	McLaren M10B	Chevrolet 5.0 V8	MAL	SNE	BRH	MON	SIL	CAS	MAL	MNZ	MAL	THR; 6	SIL; 3	OUL	SNE; 3	HOC; 3	OUL; 6	BRH; Ret	BRH; 5		8th	18
1972	Racing Team V.D.S.	McLaren M18/M22	Chevrolet 5.0 V8	BRH; 5	MAL; Ret	SNE; 2	BRH; 5	NIV; 2	SIL; Ret	MON						OUL; 5	BRH; 8					5th	25
1972	Racing Team V.D.S.	McLaren M22	Chevrolet 5.0 V8								OUL; 3	MAL; 4	BRH; Ret	SIL	BRH							5th	25
1973	Racing Team V.D.S.	McLaren M18/M22	Chevrolet 5.0 V8	BRH; 7	MAL																	1st	136
1973	Racing Team V.D.S.	Chevron B24	Chevrolet 5.0 V8			SIL; 6	SNE; Ret	BRH; 4	OUL; 1	MAL; 3	**MIS**; C	MAL; 3	MON; 7	SIL; C	BRH; 1	OUL; 2	JYL; 2	ZAN; 8	SNE; 2	**BRH**; Ret		1st	136
1974	Chevron Racing Team V.D.S.	Chevron B28	Chevrolet 5.0 V8	BRH; Ret	MAL; Ret	SIL; 5	**OUL**; Ret	BRH; 7	**ZOL**; Ret	THR; 7	**ZAN**; 5	MUG; 3	MNZ; 2	MAL; 6	MON; 4	THR; 7	BRH; DNS	OUL; 2	SNE; 4	MAL; DNS	BRH; 6	4th	108
1975	Racing Team V.D.S.	Lola T400	Chevrolet 5.0 V8	BRH; NC	OUL; 6	BRH; 5	SIL; 11	ZOL; NC	ZAN; 2	THR; 2	**SNE**; Ret	**MAL**; 1	**THR**; 1	BRH; Ret	OUL; 3	SIL; 5	**SNE**; 1	MAL; 1	BRH; 2			1st	174
1978	Stanley BRM	BRM P207	BRM P202 3.0 V12	OUL; Ret	BRH; 5	SNE; Ret	MAL; Ret	ZAN	DON	THR; Ret	OUL; 4	MAL; Ret	BRH; Ret	THR; Ret	SNE; Ret							13th	20

=== Complete Formula One World Championship results ===
(key)

Year	Entrant	Chassis	Engine	1	2	3	4	5	6	7	8	9	10	11	12	13	14	15	16	17	WDC	Pts
1974	Hitachi Team Brabham	Brabham BT42	Ford Cosworth DFV 3.0 V8	ARG	BRA	RSA	ESP	BEL; 17	MON	SWE	NED	FRA	GBR	GER	AUT	ITA	CAN	USA			NC	0
1977	Stanley BRM	BRM P207	BRM P202 3.0 V12	ARG	BRA	RSA	USW	ESP	MON	BEL	SWE	FRA	GBR	GER; DNQ	AUT	NED; DNQ	ITA; DNQ	USA	CAN	JPN	NC	0

=== Complete Formula One non-championship results ===
(key)

Year	Entrant	Chassis	Engine	1	2	3	4	5	6	7	8
1971	Racing Team V.D.S.	McLaren M10B (F5000)	Chevrolet 5.0 V8	ARG	ROC	QUE	SPR	INT	RIN	OUL	VIC; 14
1972	Racing Team V.D.S.	McLaren M18/M22 (F5000)	Chevrolet 5.0 V8	ROC; 13	BRA	INT; 11			VIC; Ret		
1972	Racing Team V.D.S.	McLaren M22 (F5000)	Chevrolet 5.0 V8				OUL; 9	REP			
1973	Racing Team V.D.S.	McLaren M18/M22 (F5000)	Chevrolet 5.0 V8	ROC; Ret							
1973	Racing Team V.D.S.	Chevron B24 (F5000)	Chevrolet 5.0 V8		INT; Ret						
1974	Racing Team V.D.S.	Chevron B28 (F5000)	Chevrolet 5.0 V8	PRE	ROC; Ret	INT; 10					
1975	Racing Team V.D.S.	Lola T400 (F5000)	Chevrolet 5.0 V8	ROC; DNQ	INT	SUI					

Sporting positions
Preceded by Gijs van Lennep	European Formula 5000 Championship; Champion; 1973	Succeeded by Bob Evans
Preceded by Bob Evans	European Formula 5000 Championship; Champion; 1975	Succeeded by David Purley
