= 1974 Race of Champions =

- Non-championship race in the 1974 Formula One season

Race details
- Date: 17 March 1974
- Location: Brands Hatch Grand Prix Circuit; Fawkham, Kent, England
- Course: Permanent racing facility
- Course length: 4.206 km (2.6136 miles)
- Distance: 40 laps, 168.24 km (104.544 miles)

Pole position
Driver	(United Kingdom) James Hunt	Hesketh-Cosworth
- Time: 1:21.5

Fastest lap
Driver	(Belgium) Jacky Ickx	Lotus-Cosworth
- Time: 1:33.8

Podium
First	(Belgium) Jacky Ickx	Lotus-Cosworth
Second	(Austria) Niki Lauda	Ferrari
Third	(Brazil) Emerson Fittipaldi	McLaren-Cosworth

The 1974 Race of Champions was a non-championship Formula One race held at Brands Hatch on 17 March 1974. The 40-lap race featured both Formula One and Formula 5000 cars, and was won by Belgian driver Jacky Ickx in a Lotus-Cosworth, with Austria's Niki Lauda second in a Ferrari and Brazil's Emerson Fittipaldi third in a McLaren-Cosworth.

== Qualifying ==
Note: a blue background indicates a Formula 5000 entrant.

Pos.	No.	Driver	Constructor	Lap	Gap
1	24	(United Kingdom) James Hunt	Hesketh-Ford	1:21.5	—
2	11	(Switzerland) Clay Regazzoni	Ferrari	1:21.6	+0.1
3	12	(Austria) Niki Lauda	Ferrari	1:22.1	+0.6
4	7	(Argentina) Carlos Reutemann	Brabham-Ford	1:23.0	+1.5
5	15	(France) Henri Pescarolo	BRM	1:23.1	+1.6
6	5	(Brazil) Emerson Fittipaldi	McLaren-Ford	1:23.2	+1.7
7	33	(United Kingdom) Mike Hailwood	McLaren-Ford	1:23.2	+1.7
8	19	(West Germany) Jochen Mass	Surtees-Ford	1:23.3	+1.8
9	16	(United States) Peter Revson	Shadow-Ford	1:23.6	+2.1
10	6	(New Zealand) Denny Hulme	McLaren-Ford	1:24.1	+2.6
11	2	(Belgium) Jacky Ickx	Lotus-Ford	1:24.2	+2.7
12	26	(United Kingdom) Graham Hill	Lola-Ford	1:24.6	+3.1
13	8	(United Kingdom) Richard Robarts	Brabham-Ford	1:26.0	+4.5
14	29	(New Zealand) John Nicholson	Lyncar-Ford	1:26.8	+5.3
15	22	(Liechtenstein) Rikky von Opel	Ensign-Ford	1:27.0	+5.5
16	52	(United Kingdom) Peter Gethin	Chevron-Chevrolet	1:35.5	+14.0
17	66	(United Kingdom) Brian Redman	Lola-Chevrolet	1:35.7	+14.2
18	56	(United Kingdom) Guy Edwards	Lola-Chevrolet	1:35.7	+14.2
19	62	(United Kingdom) Ian Ashley	Lola-Chevrolet	1:36.0	+14.5
20	65	(Australia) Vern Schuppan	Trojan-Chevrolet	1:36.3	+14.8
21	74	(United Kingdom) Steve Thompson	Chevron-Chevrolet	1:36.8	+15.3
22	17	(France) Jean-Pierre Jarier	Shadow-Ford	1:37.1	+15.6
23	69	(United Kingdom) Clive Santo	Lola-Chevrolet	1:37.8	+16.3
24	58	(United Kingdom) Tony Dean	Chevron-Chevrolet	1:39.0	+17.5
25	51	(Belgium) Teddy Pilette	Chevron-Chevrolet	1:39.1	+17.6
26	53	(United Kingdom) Keith Holland	Trojan-Chevrolet	1:39.7	+18.2
27	64	(United Kingdom) Mike Wilds	March-Chevrolet	1:40.5	+19.0
28	60	(United Kingdom) Damien Magee	Lola-Chevrolet	1:44.8	+23.3
29	208	(Italy) Lella Lombardi	Lola-Chevrolet	1:45.4	+23.9
30	61	(United Kingdom) Patrick Sumner	Trojan-Chevrolet	1:50.9	+29.4
31	59	(United Kingdom) Brian Robinson	McLaren-Chevrolet	1:55.1	+33.6
32	54	(United Kingdom) Allan Kayes	McLaren-Chevrolet	2:00.0	+38.5

== Classification ==
Note: a blue background indicates a Formula 5000 entrant.

Pos.	No.	Driver	Constructor	Laps	Time/Retired	Grid
1	2	(Belgium) Jacky Ickx	Lotus-Ford	40	1:03:37.6	11
2	12	(Austria) Niki Lauda	Ferrari	40	+ 1.5	3
3	5	(Brazil) Emerson Fittipaldi	McLaren-Ford	40	+ 18.3	6
4	33	(United Kingdom) Mike Hailwood	McLaren-Ford	40	+ 1:18.9	7
5	11	(Switzerland) Clay Regazzoni	Ferrari	40	+ 1:26.5	2
6	16	(United States) Peter Revson	Shadow-Ford	39	+ 1 Lap	9
7	15	(France) Henri Pescarolo	BRM	38	+ 2 Laps	5
8	62	(United Kingdom) Ian Ashley	Lola-Chevrolet	38	+ 2 Laps	19
9	74	(United Kingdom) Steve Thompson	Chevron-Chevrolet	37	+ 3 Laps	21
10	52	(United Kingdom) Peter Gethin	Chevron-Chevrolet	37	+ 3 Laps	16
11	69	(United Kingdom) Clive Santo	Lola-Chevrolet	37	+ 3 Laps	23
12	8	(United Kingdom) Richard Robarts	Brabham-Ford	36	+ 4 Laps	13
NC	6	(New Zealand) Denny Hulme	McLaren-Ford	35	Not classified	10
NC	208	(Italy) Lella Lombardi	Lola-Chevrolet		Not classified	29
NC	29	(New Zealand) John Nicholson	Lyncar-Ford		Not classified	14
NC	26	(United Kingdom) Graham Hill	Lola-Ford		Not classified	12
Ret	58	(United Kingdom) Tony Dean	Chevron-Chevrolet	38	Accident	24
Ret	60	(United Kingdom) Damien Magee	Lola-Chevrolet	28	Handling	28
Ret	7	(Argentina) Carlos Reutemann	Brabham-Ford	19	Accident	4
Ret	24	(United Kingdom) James Hunt	Hesketh-Ford	4	Accident damage	1
Ret	51	(Belgium) Teddy Pilette	Chevron-Chevrolet	1	Spun off	25
Ret	64	(United Kingdom) Mike Wilds	March-Chevrolet	1	Accident avoiding Pilette	27
DNS	19	(West Germany) Jochen Mass	Surtees-Ford		Practice accident	8
DNS	17	(France) Jean-Pierre Jarier	Shadow-Ford		Practice accident	22
DNS	22	(Liechtenstein) Rikky von Opel	Ensign-Ford		Not confident with handling	15
DNS	66	(United Kingdom) Brian Redman	Lola-Chevrolet			17
DNS	56	(United Kingdom) Guy Edwards	Lola-Chevrolet			18
DNS	65	(Australia) Vern Schuppan	Trojan-Chevrolet			20
DNS	53	(United Kingdom) Keith Holland	Trojan-Chevrolet			26
DNQ	61	(United Kingdom) Patrick Sumner	Trojan-Chevrolet			
DNQ	59	(United Kingdom) Brian Robinson	McLaren-Chevrolet			
DNQ	54	(United Kingdom) Allan Kayes	McLaren-Chevrolet			

Previous race: 1974 Presidente Medici Grand Prix	Formula One non-championship races 1974 season	Next race: 1974 BRDC International Trophy
Previous race: 1973 Race of Champions	Race of Champions	Next race: 1975 Race of Champions
