= 1967 Spanish Grand Prix =

- Non-championship race in the 1967 Formula One season
- The Jarama Circuit (1967–1990)

Race details
- Date: 12 November 1967
- Official name: XIII Gran Premio de España
- Location: Circuito Permanente del Jarama, Madrid, Spain
- Course: Permanent racing facility
- Course length: 3.404 km (2.115 miles)
- Distance: 60 laps, 204.240 km (126.900 miles)
- Weather: Warm and sunny

Pole position
| Driver | (United Kingdom) Jim Clark | Lotus-Ford |
- Time: 1:28.2

Fastest lap
| Driver | (United Kingdom) Jim Clark | Lotus-Ford |
- Time: 1:28.8

Podium
| First | (United Kingdom) Jim Clark | Lotus-Ford |
| Second | (United Kingdom) Graham Hill | Lotus-Ford |
| Third | (Australia) Jack Brabham | Brabham-Repco |

The 1967 Spanish Grand Prix was a Formula One non-championship race held at Jarama on 12 November 1967.

This race was held because at that time the FIA regulations required a demonstration race to be held as a quality check, before a Grand Prix could be admitted as a World Championship event. Due to the scheduling of the race, after the end of the World Championship season, few Formula One teams decided to participate. With only four Formula One cars entered, the field was filled out by Formula Two cars weighted with lead to bring them up to the Formula One weight limit.

== Entry ==
Only four Formula One cars were entered for the race, including two Lotus 49s for the two primary Team Lotus drivers, Jim Clark and Graham Hill. Lotus had also brought a Formula Two Lotus 48 which they hoped to sell to local driver Alex Soler-Roig. The other two F1 cars were a Ferrari 312/67 entered by Scuderia Ferrari for Andrea de Adamich, and a Brabham BT20 which Jack Brabham was to drive.

The Formula Two entry included many of the regular F2 season entrants. BMW entered two Lola T100s for Jo Siffert and Hubert Hahne, and Brian Redman brought his own Cosworth-engined Lola T100. Tyrrell fielded a Matra MS5 for Jacky Ickx, and a Matra MS7 for Jackie Stewart. Matra themselves entered three cars: an MS5 for Johnny Servoz-Gavin, and two MS7s for Henri Pescarolo and Jean-Pierre Beltoise. There was another MS5 for Jo Schlesser, entered by Ecurie Ford France. Three other drivers brought Brabhams: Chris Lambert and Robert Lamplough had Brabham BT21As, and Alan Rees had a Roy Winkelmann BT23. The other entrant was Alan Rollinson in his McLaren M4A.

== Qualifying ==
=== Qualifying report ===
The two Formula One Lotuses were on the front row of the grid, with Clark 1.5 seconds faster than Hill. Stewart in the Formula Two Matra MS7 achieved the same time as Hill, and lined up alongside the Lotuses on the three-car front row. De Adamich managed fifth in the Ferrari on his debut in an F1 car, while the other F1 car of Jack Brabham lined up seventh. The F2 cars filled the rest of the grid, although Soler-Roig decided not to purchase the Lotus 48 he practiced, and so did not take part in the race.

=== Qualifying classification ===
Note: a blue background indicates a Formula Two entrant.

| Pos | No. | Driver | Constructor | Time | Gap (sec.) |
|---|---|---|---|---|---|
| 1 | 1 | (United Kingdom) Jim Clark | Lotus-Ford | 1:28.2 | |
| 2 | 2 | (United Kingdom) Graham Hill | Lotus-Ford | 1:29.7 | + 1.5 |
| 3 | 5 | (United Kingdom) Jackie Stewart | Matra-Ford | 1:29.7 | + 1.5 |
| 4 | 8 | (Switzerland) Jo Siffert | Lola-BMW | 1:30.4 | + 2.2 |
| 5 | 15 | (Italy) Andrea de Adamich | Ferrari | 1:30.5 | + 2.3 |
| 6 | 19 | (France) Jean-Pierre Beltoise | Matra-Ford | 1:30.7 | + 2.5 |
| 7 | 3 | (Australia) Jack Brabham | Brabham-Repco | 1:31.3 | + 3.1 |
| 8 | 4 | (Belgium) Jacky Ickx | Matra-Ford | 1:31.6 | + 3.4 |
| 9 | 9 | (Germany) Hubert Hahne | Lola-BMW | 1:31.6 | + 3.4 |
| 10 | 10 | (United Kingdom) Alan Rees | Brabham-Ford | 1:32.5 | + 4.3 |
| 11 | 16 | (France) Henri Pescarolo | Matra-Ford | 1:32.6 | + 4.4 |
| 12 | 6 | (United Kingdom) Brian Redman | Lola-Ford | 1:33.0 | + 4.8 |
| 13 | 12 | (France) Jo Schlesser | Matra-Ford | 1:33.2 | + 5.0 |
| 14 | 7 | (United Kingdom) Chris Lambert | Brabham-Ford | 1:34.5 | + 6.3 |
| 15 | 18 | (France) Johnny Servoz-Gavin | Matra-Ford | 1:34.6 | + 6.4 |
| 16 | 20 | (Spain) Alex Soler-Roig | Lotus-Ford | 1:35.5 | + 7.3 |
| 17 | 11 | (United Kingdom) Alan Rollinson | McLaren-Ford | 1:35.6 | + 7.4 |
| 18 | 14 | (United Kingdom) Robert Lamplough | Brabham-Lotus | 1:37.9 | + 9.7 |

== Race ==
=== Race report ===
In the race, Clark led from start to finish. Hill held second place throughout the race, although Siffert briefly challenged. The first retirement was Lamplough, who suffered a gearbox failure on his Brabham-Lotus on lap 2. Rollinson dropped out on lap 8 with a broken brake pedal, and Hahne's engine failed on lap 34.

The next retirement came when Stewart, who had been duelling with Brabham for fourth place behind Siffert, slid wide, left the track and crashed into a barrier. Stewart was uninjured. Shortly afterwards on lap 46, the BMW engine in Siffert's Lola caught fire, and he also retired. The order was now Clark, Hill, Brabham, de Adamich and Servoz-Gavin. With five laps to go, de Adamich's Ferrari suffered a puncture, and he lost a lap and a half getting his wheel changed.

Clark took the victory after 60 laps, with Hill 15 seconds behind. Brabham was third, the only other car on the lead lap. Servoz-Gavin finished fourth, ahead of Schlesser, who was suffering from engine problems. Ickx finished sixth, with Pescarolo seventh, two laps down. Redman had stopped to investigate bodywork damage and finished eighth ahead of the recovering de Adamich, while Beltoise came tenth after a pit-stop for shock absorber problems. Rees and Lambert finished a further lap adrift in 11th and 12th respectively.

=== Race classification ===
Note: a blue background indicates a Formula Two entrant.

| Pos | No. | Driver | Constructor | Laps | Time/Retired | Grid |
|---|---|---|---|---|---|---|
| 1 | 1 | (United Kingdom) Jim Clark | Lotus-Ford | 60 | 1:31:10.4 | 1 |
| 2 | 2 | (United Kingdom) Graham Hill | Lotus-Ford | 60 | + 15.2 s | 2 |
| 3 | 3 | (Australia) Jack Brabham | Brabham-Repco | 60 | + 1:11.5 | 7 |
| 4 | 18 | (France) Johnny Servoz-Gavin | Matra-Ford | 59 | + 1 lap | 15 |
| 5 | 12 | (France) Jo Schlesser | Matra-Ford | 59 | + 1 lap | 13 |
| 6 | 4 | (Belgium) Jacky Ickx | Matra-Ford | 59 | + 1 lap | 8 |
| 7 | 16 | (France) Henri Pescarolo | Matra-Ford | 58 | + 2 laps | 11 |
| 8 | 6 | (United Kingdom) Brian Redman | Lola-Ford | 58 | + 2 laps | 12 |
| 9 | 15 | (Italy) Andrea de Adamich | Ferrari | 58 | + 2 laps | 5 |
| 10 | 19 | (France) Jean-Pierre Beltoise | Matra-Ford | 58 | + 2 laps | 6 |
| 11 | 10 | (United Kingdom) Alan Rees | Brabham-Ford | 57 | + 3 laps | 10 |
| 12 | 7 | (United Kingdom) Chris Lambert | Brabham-Ford | 57 | + 3 laps | 14 |
| Ret | 8 | (Switzerland) Jo Siffert | Lola-BMW | 45 | Engine | 4 |
| Ret | 5 | (United Kingdom) Jackie Stewart | Matra-Ford | 42 | Accident | 3 |
| Ret | 9 | (Germany) Hubert Hahne | Lola-BMW | 33 | Engine | 9 |
| Ret | 11 | (United Kingdom) Alan Rollinson | McLaren-Ford | 7 | Brake pedal | 17 |
| Ret | 14 | (United Kingdom) Robert Lamplough | Brabham-Lotus | 1 | Gearbox | 18 |
| DNS | 20 | (Spain) Alex Soler-Roig | Lotus-Ford | | Withdrew | 16 |

| Previous race: 1967 International Gold Cup | Formula One non-championship races 1967 season | Next race: 1968 Race of Champions |
| Previous race: 1954 Spanish Grand Prix | Spanish Grand Prix | Next race: 1968 Spanish Grand Prix |
