= 1974 BRDC International Trophy =

- Non-championship race in the 1974 Formula One season
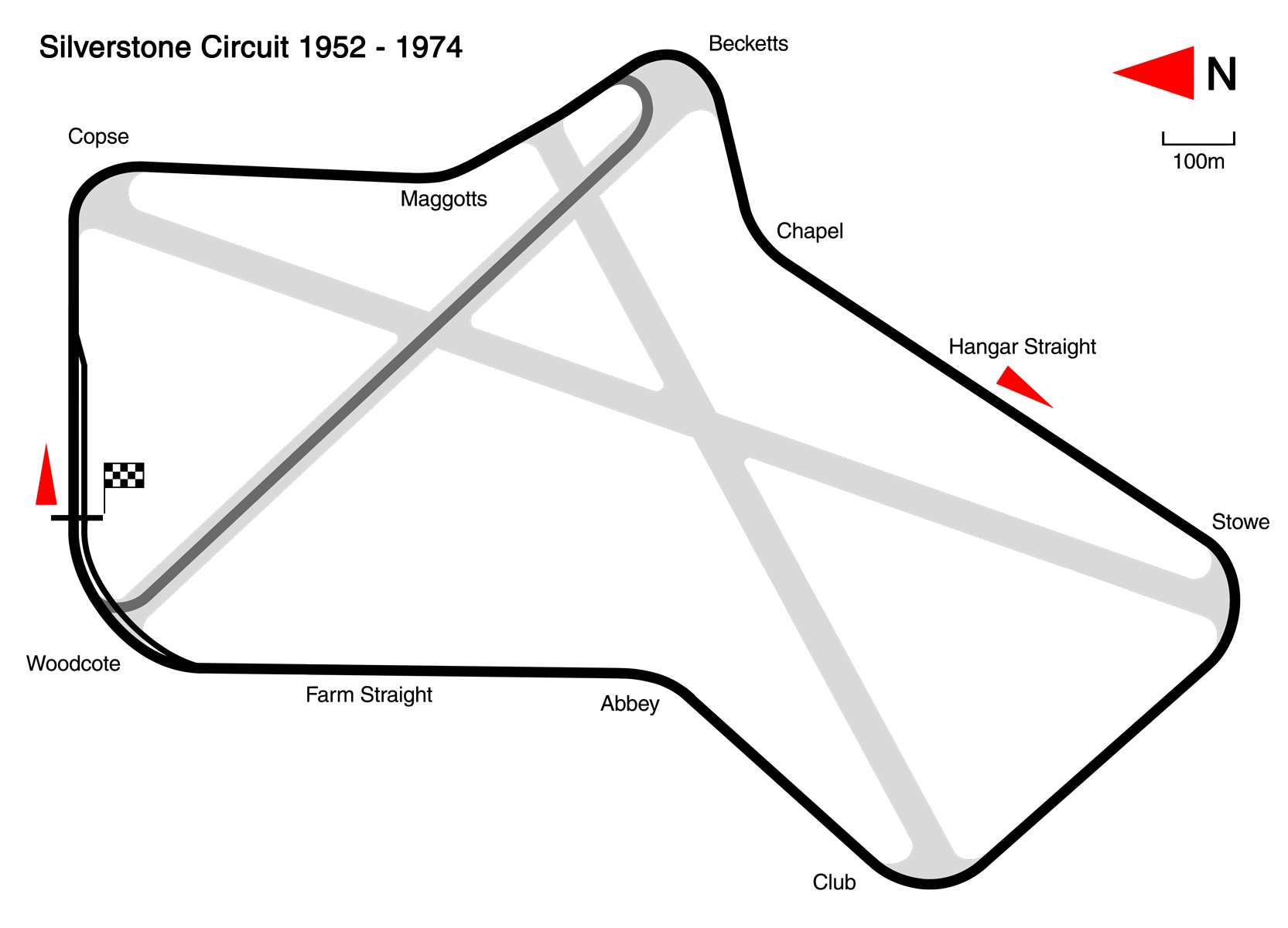
- The Silverstone circuit in 1974.

Race details
- Date: 7 April 1974
- Official name: 26th Daily Express International Trophy
- Location: Silverstone Circuit, Northamptonshire
- Course: Permanent racing facility
- Course length: 4.7105 km (2.9629 miles)
- Distance: 40 laps, 188.42 km (118.51 miles)
- Weather: Dry

Pole position
| Driver | (United Kingdom) James Hunt | Hesketh-Ford |
- Time: 1:16.7

Fastest lap
| Driver | (United Kingdom) James Hunt | Hesketh-Ford |
- Time: 1:17.6

Podium
| First | (United Kingdom) James Hunt | Hesketh-Ford |
| Second | (Germany) Jochen Mass | Surtees-Ford |
| Third | (France) Jean-Pierre Jarier | Shadow-Ford |

The 26th BRDC International Trophy was a non-championship Formula One race held at Silverstone on 7 April 1974. The 40-lap race was run in connection with a Formula 5000 event, and was won from pole position by James Hunt, driving a Hesketh-Ford, with Jochen Mass second in a Surtees-Ford and Jean-Pierre Jarier third in a Shadow-Ford.

== Classification ==
Note: a blue background indicates a Formula 5000 entrant.

| Pos | Driver | Constructor | Laps | Time/Ret. | Grid |
|---|---|---|---|---|---|
| 1 | (United Kingdom) James Hunt | Hesketh-Ford | 40 | 52:35.4 | 1 |
| 2 | (Germany) Jochen Mass | Surtees-Ford | 40 | + 37.0 | 3 |
| 3 | (France) Jean-Pierre Jarier | Shadow-Ford | 40 | + 59.2 | 10 |
| 4 | (France) Henri Pescarolo | BRM | 40 | + 59.4 | 8 |
| 5 | (France) François Migault | BRM | 40 | + 1:18.5 | 6 |
| 6 | (New Zealand) John Nicholson | Lyncar-Ford | 39 | + 1 Lap | 18 |
| 7 | (United Kingdom) Peter Gethin | Chevron-Chevrolet | 39 | + 1 Lap | 11 |
| 8 | (United Kingdom) Brian Redman | Ensign-Ford | 39 | + 1 Lap | 9 |
| 9 | (United Kingdom) Guy Edwards | Lola-Ford | 39 | + 1 Lap | 15 |
| 10 | (Belgium) Teddy Pilette | Chevron-Chevrolet | 39 | + 1 Lap | 21 |
| 11 | (Japan) Noritake Takahara | March-Ford | 39 | + 1 Lap | 14 |
| 12 | (United Kingdom) Tony Dean | Chevron-Chevrolet | 39 | + 1 Lap | 19 |
| 13 | (Italy) Lella Lombardi | Lola-Chevrolet | 39 | + 1 Lap | 23 |
| 14 | (United Kingdom) Richard Robarts | Brabham-Ford | 39 | + 1 Lap | 12 |
| Ret | (Denmark) Tom Belsø | Lola-Chevrolet | 38 | Out of Fuel | 24 |
| Ret | (United Kingdom) Ian Ashley | Lola-Chevrolet | 37 | Out of Fuel | 20 |
| NC | (United Kingdom) Damien Magee | Lola-Chevrolet | 35 | + 5 Laps | 25 |
| NC | (United Kingdom) Mike Wilds | March-Chevrolet | 35 | + 5 Laps | 16 |
| Ret | (United Kingdom) Graham Hill | Lola-Ford | 35 | Accident | 7 |
| Ret | (Sweden) Ronnie Peterson | Lotus-Ford | 30 | Engine | 2 |
| Ret | (New Zealand) Denny Hulme | McLaren-Ford | 19 | Clutch | 5 |
| Ret | (United Kingdom) Tom Pryce | Token-Ford | 16 | Gearbox | 32 |
| Ret | (United Kingdom) Clive Santo | Lola-Chevrolet | 13 | Engine | 31 |
| Ret | (Netherlands) Roelof Wunderink | Chevron-Chevrolet | 10 | Engine | 30 |
| Ret | (United Kingdom) Brian Robinson | McLaren-Ford | 5 | Engine | 29 |
| Ret | (United Kingdom) Mike Hailwood | McLaren-Ford | 5 | Engine | 4 |
| DNS | (United Kingdom) David Hobbs | Lola-Chevrolet | | | 13 |
| DNS | (United Kingdom) Keith Holland | Trojan-Chevrolet | | | 17 |
| DNS | (United Kingdom) Bob Evans | Lola-Chevrolet | | | 22 |
| DNS | (Australia) Vern Schuppan | Trojan-Chevrolet | | | 26 |
| DNS | (Australia) Brian McGuire | Trojan-Chevrolet | | | 27 |
| DNS | (New Zealand) Chris Amon | Amon-Ford | | | 28 |
| DNQ | (United Kingdom) Colin Andrews | Surtees-Chevrolet | | | |
| DNQ | (United Kingdom) Nick Wattiez | Lola-Ford | | | |
| DNQ | (United Kingdom) Trevor Twaites | Lola-Ford | | | |
| DNQ | (United Kingdom) Patrick Sumner | Trojan-Chevrolet | | | |
| DNQ | (United Kingdom) Ian Taylor | March-Chevrolet | | | |

| Previous race: 1974 Race of Champions | Formula One non-championship races 1974 season | Next race: 1975 Race of Champions |
| Previous race: 1973 BRDC International Trophy | BRDC International Trophy | Next race: 1975 BRDC International Trophy |
