= Alan Rollinson =

British racing driver (1943–2019)

- Born: 15 May 1943; Walsall, Staffordshire, England
- Died: 2 June 2019 (aged 76)

Formula One World Championship career
- Nationality: (United Kingdom) British
- Active years: 1965
- Team: non-works Cooper
- Entries: 1 (0 starts)
- Championships: 0
- Wins: 0
- Podiums: 0
- Career points: 0
- Pole positions: 0
- Fastest laps: 0
- First entry: 1965 British Grand Prix

Alan William Rollinson (15 May 1943 – 2 June 2019) was a British racing driver from England. He entered one Formula One World Championship Grand Prix, the 1965 British Grand Prix, with a Cooper T71/73 run by Gerard Racing, but he failed to qualify. He competed more successfully in various other formulas, including Formula 5000.

Rollinson died of cancer in 2019.

== Complete Formula One World Championship results ==
(key)

Year	Entrant	Chassis	Engine	1	2	3	4	5	6	7	8	9	10	WDC	Points
1965	Gerard Racing	Cooper T71/73	Ford Straight-4	RSA	MON	BEL	FRA	GBR; DNS	NED	GER	ITA	USA	MEX	NC	0

== Complete Formula One Non-Championship results ==
(key)

Year	Entrant	Chassis	Engine	1	2	3	4	5	6	7	8
1967	Frank Lythgoe Racing	McLaren M4A	Cosworth Straight-4	ROC	SPR	INT	SYR	OUL; 9	ESP; Ret		
1969	Irish Racing Cars	Brabham BT30	Cosworth Straight-4	ROC	INT	MAD	OUL; 6				
1970	Irish Racing Cars	Surtees TS5A	Chevrolet V8	ROC	INT	OUL; Ret					
1971	Jo Siffert Automobiles	March 701	Cosworth DFV V8	ARG	ROC	QUE	SPR; 5				
1971	Team Surtees	Surtees TS7	Cosworth DFV V8					INT; 14	RIN		
1971	Alan McKechnie	Surtees TS8	Chevrolet V8							OUL; 4	VIC; 10
1972	Alan McKechnie	Lola T300	Chevrolet V8	ROC; 10	BRA	INT; 15	OUL; Ret	REP	VIC; 14		
