= 1979 Hitachi Trophy =

Brands Hatch (1976–1987)

The 1979 Hitachi Trophy was a non-championship race open to Formula Two and Formula Atlantic cars. The race was held at Brands Hatch on 15 April 1979 as a support race for the 1979 Race of Champions. It was won by British driver Norman Dickson in the Dickson's of Perth's March-Hart 792. The Formula Atlantic class win went to Ray Mallock, who finished in fourth place in the overall standings.

== Report ==
=== Entry ===
Only nine F2 cars were entered for the event, however of those, only seven took part in qualifying and race compared with the maximum grid of 26 starters which took part in the European Formula 2 race at Thruxton the next day. An additional 16 Formula Atlantic cars were entered, of which five of these did not arrive.

=== Qualifying ===
Norman Dickson took pole position, with a lap time of 1:26.2. This time would have placed Dickson 19th on the grid for the Race of Champions race being run the same day. John Cooper was only one tenth of a second behind in his March-Hart 792, with Divina Galica took an encouraging third place. Next up was Ray Mallock's Ralt-Ford RT1 who was the top Formula Atlantic qualifier in fourth place.

=== Race ===
After 25 laps of the Brands Hatch Grand Prix circuit, Dickson took the chequered flag after 35:16.1 mins. of racing, averaging a speed of 111.16 mph. Second place went to Galica, who was the only other driver on the lead lap. She was too eager at the start, however and incurred a 60sec penalty for a false start. Brian Robinson rounded out the podium for the F2 brigade.

== Classification ==
=== Race ===
Pos.	Class Pos.	Driver	Entrant	Car - Engine	Time, Laps	Reason Out
1	F2 - 1	(United Kingdom) Norman Dickson	Dickson's of Perth	March-Hart 792	35:16.1	
2	F2 - 2	(United Kingdom) Divina Galica	Divina Galica	March-Hart 792	37:21.8	incl 60sec pen. for false start
3	F2 - 3	(United Kingdom) Brian Robinson	Grange Performance Cars	Chevron-Hart B42	24	
4	FA - 1	(United Kingdom) Ray Mallock	Mario Deliotti Racing	Ralt-Ford RT1	35:31.6, 24	
5	FA - 2	(United Kingdom) Bernard Hunter		Ralt-Ford RT1	24	
6	FA - 3	(United Kingdom) Phil Dowsett	Wilding Office Equipment/Glaister Card Shops	March-Ford 79B	24	
7	F2 - 4	(Belgium) Germain Garon	Germain Garon	Chevron-Hart B42	23	
8	FA - 4	(United Kingdom) Martin Mansell		Lola-Ford T360	23	
9	FA - 5	(United Kingdom) Roger Andreason		Druid-Ford 79A	23	
10	FA - 6	(United Kingdom) Geoff Byman		March-Ford 75B	23	
DNF	FA	(Republic of Ireland) Alo Lawler	L&B Excavations Racing	Lola-Ford T760	15	Collision with Jeffrey
DNF	FA	(United Kingdom) Andrew Jeffrey	The Hope Scott Garage	Chevron-Ford B49	15	Collision with Lawler
DNF	F2	(United Kingdom) John Cooper	JC Racing	March-Hart 792	11	Clutch
DNF	F2	(Luxembourg) Lucien Lampach	Allomo Racing	Lampach	7	Engine
DNF	F2	(United Kingdom) Tony Dean	AG Dean Racing	Chevron-Hart B42	5	Gear selectors
DNF	FA	(United Kingdom) Jim Crawford	SDC Racing	Chevron-Ford B45	1	Accident
DNF	FA	(United Kingdom) Rick Gorne	Barratt Developments Racing with Anglia Cars	Argo-Ford JM1X	0	Accident
DNS	FA	(United Kingdom) Dave Allen	Savon Team Uniroyal	Surtees-Ford TS10		

- Fastest lap: Norman Dickson, 1:23.3.
