= McLaren M22 =

Open-wheel race car

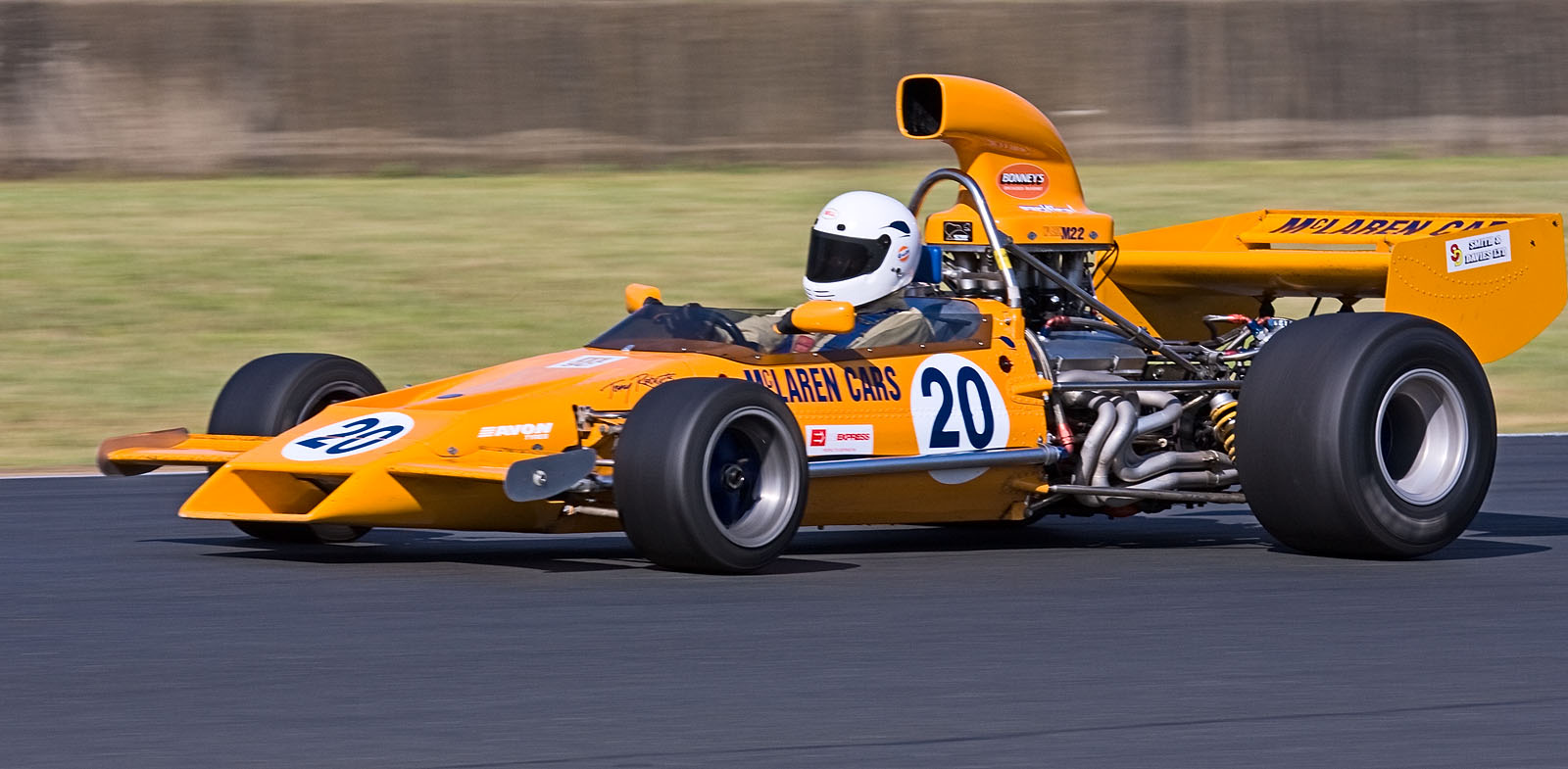
McLaren M22-Chevrolet

The McLaren M22 is an open-wheel race car, designed and developed by McLaren, to compete in Formula 5000 racing in 1972. Like it predecessors, The McLaren M22 was manufactured in large numbers. Built close to the weight limit, it was very light and was powered by a 500+ hp Chevrolet V8 engine. The cars were not actually manufactured by McLaren itself, but by the British racing car manufacturer Trojan, as with previous models. This would turn out to be the last Trojan-built McLaren F5000 car.
