= 1973 BRDC International Trophy =

Formula One race

The 25th BRDC International Trophy was a non-championship Formula One race held at Silverstone on 8 April 1973. The race was run in connection with a Formula 5000 event.

== Classification ==
Note: a blue background indicates a Formula 5000 entrant.

Pos	Driver	Constructor	Laps	Time/Ret.
1	(United Kingdom) Jackie Stewart	Tyrrell-Ford	40	52:53.2
2	(Sweden) Ronnie Peterson	Lotus-Ford	40	+ 10.4 s
3	(Switzerland) Clay Regazzoni	BRM	40	
4	(United States) Peter Revson	McLaren-Ford	40	
5	(Austria) Niki Lauda	BRM	40	
6	(United States) George Follmer	Shadow-Ford	39	+ 1 Lap
7	(Netherlands) Gijs van Lennep	Lola-Chevrolet	38	+ 2 Laps
8	(Denmark) Tom Belsø	Lola-Chevrolet	38	+ 2 Laps
9	(Australia) Vern Schuppan	BRM	38	+ 2 Laps
10	(United Kingdom) Keith Holland	Trojan-Chevrolet	38	+ 2 laps
11	(United Kingdom) Tony Dean	Chevron-Chevrolet	38	+ 2 laps
12	(United Kingdom) Clive Santo	Surtees-Chevrolet	37	+ 3 Laps
13	(United States) Bobby Brown	Chevron-Chevrolet	37	+ 3 Laps
Ret	(United States) Brett Lunger	Lola-Chevrolet	33	+ 7 laps
Ret	(United Kingdom) David Oxton	Begg-Ford	27	Differential
Ret	(United Kingdom) Mike Hailwood	Surtees-Ford	27	Differential
Ret	(New Zealand) Howden Ganley	Iso-Marlboro-Ford	24	Oil pressure
Ret	(New Zealand) Denny Hulme	McLaren-Ford	24	Oil pressure
Ret	(United Kingdom) David Hobbs	Lola-Chevrolet	23	Engine
Ret	(United Kingdom) Bob Evans	Trojan-Chevrolet	21	Engine
Ret	(United Kingdom) Jock Russell	McRae-Chevrolet	17	Engine
Ret	(United Kingdom) Steve Thompson	Chevron-Chevrolet	17	Engine
Ret	(Brazil) Carlos Pace	Surtees-Ford	16	Wheel nut
Ret	(Belgium) Teddy Pilette	Chevron-Chevrolet	10	Engine
Ret	(United Kingdom) Ray Allen	Surtees-Chevrolet	6	Fuel pressure
Ret	(New Zealand) Graham McRae	McRae-Chevrolet	5	Engine
Ret	(United Kingdom) Ian Ashley	Lola-Chevrolet	4	Accident
Ret	(United Kingdom) Jackie Oliver	Shadow-Ford	1	Clutch
Ret	(Brazil) Emerson Fittipaldi	Lotus-Ford	1	Clutch

== Notes ==
- Fastest lap: Ronnie Peterson - 1:17.5
- Pole Position: Emerson Fittipaldi - 1:16.4

Previous race: 1973 Race of Champions	Formula One non-championship races 1973 season	Next race: 1974 Presidente Medici Grand Prix
Previous race: 1972 BRDC International Trophy	BRDC International Trophy	Next race: 1974 BRDC International Trophy
