= 1969 Madrid Grand Prix =

- Non-championship race in the 1969 Formula One season
- Circuito Permanente del Jarama's layout

Race details
- Date: 13 April 1969
- Official name: III Gran Premio de Madrid
- Location: Circuito Permanente del Jarama, Madrid
- Course: Permanent racing facility
- Course length: 3.404 km (2.115 miles)
- Distance: 40 laps, 136.6 km (84.6 miles)

Pole position
Driver	(United Kingdom) Peter Gethin	McLaren-Chevrolet
- Time: 1:31.9

Fastest lap
Driver	(United Kingdom) Peter Gethin	McLaren-Chevrolet
- Time: 1:30.9

Podium
First	(United Kingdom) Keith Holland	Lola-Chevrolet
Second	(United Kingdom) Tony Dean	BRM
Third	(United Kingdom) Jock Russell	Lotus-Ford

The 1969 Madrid Grand Prix was a Formula One non-championship race held at Jarama, Madrid on 13 April 1969, run over 40 laps of the circuit. The field only included two Formula One cars, however, the remainder being Formula 5000 and Formula Two cars.

The entrants included Max Mosley, later to become president of the FIA, who drove a Formula Two Lotus.

The fastest combination in the event was clearly Peter Gethin in his F5000 McLaren-Chevrolet, but after an engine failure on the last lap, it was left to Keith Holland to take the victory, with the rest of the field at least a lap down. Contemporary reports listed Tony Dean (BRM P261) as finishing second having completed 39 out of 40 laps. However, Gethin broke down on lap 40 and some later reports classify him as second.

== Qualifying ==
Note: a blue background indicates a Formula 5000 entrant and a pink background indicates a Formula Two entrant.

Pos	No.	Driver	Constructor	Lap	Gap
1	53	(United Kingdom) Peter Gethin	McLaren-Chevrolet	1:31.9	—
2	52	(United Kingdom) Keith Holland	Lola-Chevrolet	1:35.2	+3.3
3	12	(United Kingdom) Tony Dean	BRM	1:35.8	+3.9
4	16	(United Kingdom) Max Mosley	Lotus-Ford	1:38.3	+6.4
5	54	(United Kingdom) Robert Lamplough	Lotus-Ford	1:39.0	+7.1
6	14	(United Kingdom) Neil Corner	Cooper-Maserati	1:41.1	+9.2
7	55	(United Kingdom) Jock Russell	Lotus-Ford	1:42.4	+10.5
8	11	(New Zealand) Bill Stone	Brabham-Lotus	No time	—
DNA	15	(New Zealand) Graham McRae	Brabham-Ford		
DNA	51	(United Kingdom) Mike Hailwood	Lola-Chevrolet		

== Classification ==
Pos	No.	Driver	Entrant	Constructor	Laps	Time/Retired
1	52	(United Kingdom) Keith Holland	Alan Fraser Racing Team	Lola-Chevrolet	40	1.03:29.8
2	12	(United Kingdom) Tony Dean	A. G. Dean	BRM	39	+ 1 lap
3	55	(United Kingdom) Jock Russell	Jock Russell	Lotus-Ford	38	+ 2 laps
4	14	(United Kingdom) Neil Corner	Antiques Automobiles Racing	Cooper-Maserati	38	+ 2 laps
Ret	53	(United Kingdom) Peter Gethin	Church Farm Racing Team	McLaren-Chevrolet	39	Engine ‡
Ret	11	(New Zealand) Bill Stone	Jack Smith	Brabham-Lotus	36	Retired
Ret	16	(United Kingdom) Max Mosley	Len Street (Engineering)	Lotus-Ford	14	Injector trumpet
Ret	54	(United Kingdom) Robert Lamplough	Robert Lamplough	Lotus-Ford	0	Engine

- The fastest lap for a Formula One car during the race was 1:34.2 by Tony Dean.
- ‡Some websites mistakenly give Gethin second place based on the number of laps completed, but was a DNF because he broke an engine connecting rod one lap from the end while leading the race and couldn't finished it.

Previous race: 1969 BRDC International Trophy	Formula One non-championship races 1969 season	Next race: 1969 International Gold Cup
Previous race: —	Madrid Grand Prix	Next race: —
