= 1969 International Gold Cup =

- Non-championship race in the 1969 Formula One season

Race details
- Date: 16 August 1969
- Official name: XVI International Gold Cup
- Location: Oulton Park, Cheshire
- Course: Permanent racing facility
- Course length: 4.4434 km (2.7610 mi)
- Distance: 40 laps, 177.749 km (110.448 mi)

Pole position
Driver	(United Kingdom) Jackie Stewart	Matra-Cosworth
- Time: 1:27.2

Fastest lap
Driver	(United Kingdom) Jackie Stewart	Matra-Cosworth
- Time: 1:28.6

Podium
First	(Belgium) Jacky Ickx	Brabham-Cosworth
Second	(Austria) Jochen Rindt	Lotus-Cosworth
Third	(Italy) Andrea de Adamich	Surtees-Chevrolet

The 16th International Gold Cup was a non-championship Formula One race held at Oulton Park on August 16, 1969. The race was open to Formula One, Formula Two and Formula 5000 cars. Brabham driver Jacky Ickx was first in Formula One and first overall, ahead of Jochen Rindt giving the four wheel drive Lotus 63 its best ever result. Andrea de Adamich's Lola T142 was top Formula 5000 finisher and third overall, and Alan Rollinson in a Brabham was top Formula Two finisher and sixth overall. Jackie Stewart qualified his Matra MS80 on pole and set fastest lap but a pit stop to remedy a broken battery lead dropped him down the field.

== Classification ==
Blue background denotes F5000 entrants, red background denotes F2 entrants.

Pos	No	Driver	Entrant	Constructor	Time/Retired	Grid
1	6	(Belgium) Jacky Ickx	Motor Racing Developments	Brabham BT26A-Cosworth	1:00:28.6, 176.35kph	2
2	2	(Austria) Jochen Rindt	Gold Leaf Team Lotus	Lotus 63-Cosworth	+22.2s	4
3	17	(Italy) Andrea de Adamich	Team Surtees	Surtees TS5-Chevrolet	+1 lap	5
4	18	(United Kingdom) Trevor Taylor	Team Surtees	Surtees TS5-Chevrolet	+1 lap	8
5	16	(United Kingdom) Mike Hailwood	Paul Hawkins	Lola T142-Chevrolet	+1 lap	9
6	20	(United Kingdom) Alan Rollinson	Irish Racing Cars	Brabham BT30-Cosworth	+2 laps	12
7	15	(United Kingdom) Mike Walker	McKechnie Racing Organisation	Lola T142-Chevrolet	+2 laps	11
8	19	(United Kingdom) Keith Holland	Alan Fraser Racing Team	Lola T142-Chevrolet	+2 laps	13
9	4	(United Kingdom) Jackie Stewart	Matra International	Matra MS80-Cosworth	+3 laps	1
NC	11	(Switzerland) Silvio Moser	Silvio Moser Racing Team	Brabham BT24-Cosworth	+10 laps	7
Ret	1	(United Kingdom) Graham Hill	Roy Winkelmann Racing	Lotus 59-Ford	36 laps, oil pipe	10
Ret	14	(United Kingdom) Jackie Oliver	Sports Cars CH	Lola T142-Chevrolet	13 laps, head gasket	6
Ret	10	(United Kingdom) Charles Lucas	BA Moore	BRM P261	5 laps, ignition	14
Ret	12	(United Kingdom) William Forbes	William Forbes	Lola T142-Chevrolet	0 laps, spun	15
DNS	9	(Sweden) Jo Bonnier	Ecurie Bonnier	Lotus 49B-Cosworth	Accident in practice	3

Previous race: 1969 Madrid Grand Prix	Formula One non-championship races 1969 season	Next race: 1970 Race of Champions
Previous race: 1968 International Gold Cup	Oulton Park International Gold Cup	Next race: 1970 International Gold Cup
