= 1972 BRDC International Trophy =

The 24th BRDC International Trophy was a non-championship Formula One race held at Silverstone on 23 April 1972. The race was also run to Formula 5000 regulations.

== Classification ==
Note: a blue background indicates a car running under Formula 5000 regulations.

Pos	Driver	Constructor	Laps	Time/Ret.	Grid
1	(Brazil) Emerson Fittipaldi	Lotus-Ford	40	53:17.8	1
2	(France) Jean-Pierre Beltoise	BRM	40	+ 1.8 s	3
3	(United Kingdom) John Surtees	Surtees-Ford	40	+ 10.8 s	4
4	(New Zealand) Denny Hulme	McLaren-Ford	40	+ 40.5 s	10
5	(United States) Peter Revson	McLaren-Ford	40	+ 42.3 s	5
6	(United Kingdom) Peter Gethin	BRM	40	+ 52.5	2
7	(United Kingdom) Graham Hill	Brabham-Ford	40	+ 57.2 s	12
8	(New Zealand) Graham McRae	Leda-Chevrolet	40	+ 1:12.3 s	9
9	(Netherlands) Gijs van Lennep	Surtees-Chevrolet	39	+ 1 lap	13
10	(Canada) John Cannon	March-Rover	39	+ 1 lap	15
11	(Belgium) Teddy Pilette	McLaren-Chevrolet	39	+ 1 lap	16
12	(United Kingdom) Steve Thompson	Surtees-Chevrolet	38	+ 2 laps	19
13	(United Kingdom) Clive Santo	McLaren-Chevrolet	37	+ 3 Laps	20
14	(United Kingdom) David Prophet	McLaren-Chevrolet	34	+ 6 Laps	21
15	(United Kingdom) Alan Rollinson	Surtees-Chevrolet	33	+ 7 laps	14
Ret	(United Kingdom) Mike Hailwood	Surtees-Ford	30	Overheating	6
Ret	(France) Henri Pescarolo	March-Ford	22	Overheating	7
Ret	(United Kingdom) Ray Allen	McLaren-Chevrolet	17	accident	17
Ret	(United Kingdom) Martin Ridehalgh	Lola-Chevrolet	9	Engine	24
Ret	(United Kingdom) Trevor Taylor	Leda-Chevrolet	9	Engine	22
Ret	(United Kingdom) Gordon Spice	Kitchmac-Chevrolet	5	Head Gasket	18
Ret	(United Kingdom) Jock Russell	Lotus-Ford	2	Clutch	23
DNS	(Australia) Dave Walker	Lotus-Ford			8
DNS	(United Kingdom) Brian Redman	McLaren-Chevrolet			11

== Notes ==
- Pole position: Emerson Fittipaldi - 1:18.1
- Fastest lap: Mike Hailwood - 1:18.8

Previous race: 1972 Brazilian Grand Prix	Formula One non-championship races 1972 season	Next race: 1972 International Gold Cup
Previous race: 1971 BRDC International Trophy	BRDC International Trophy	Next race: 1973 BRDC International Trophy
