= 1972 International Gold Cup =

- Non-championship race in the 1972 Formula One season
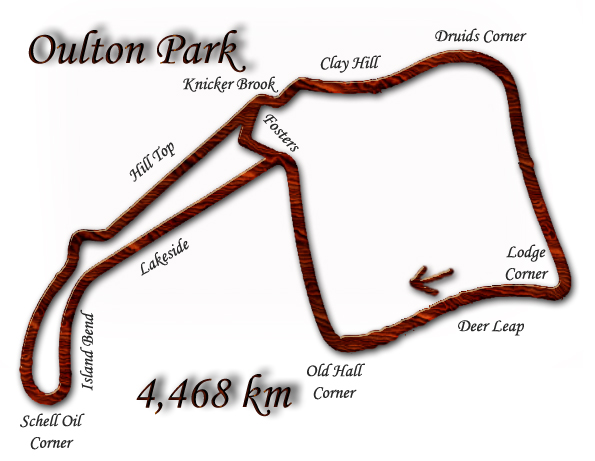
- Oulton Park circuit

Race details
- Date: 29 May 1972
- Official name: XIX International Gold Cup
- Location: Oulton Park, Cheshire
- Course: Permanent racing facility
- Course length: 4.4434 km (2.761 miles)
- Distance: 40 laps, 177.749 km ( miles)

Pole position
Driver	(United Kingdom) Peter Gethin	BRM
- Time: 1:24.6

Fastest lap
Driver	(New Zealand) Denny Hulme	McLaren-Cosworth
- Time: 1:24.4

Podium
First	(New Zealand) Denny Hulme	McLaren-Cosworth
Second	(Brazil) Emerson Fittipaldi	Lotus-Cosworth
Third	(Australia) Tim Schenken	Surtees-Cosworth

The 19th International Gold Cup was a non-championship Formula One race, which was held on the Oulton Park circuit, located near Tarporley, Cheshire, England on 29 May 1972.

== Report ==
=== Entry ===
The race had been brought forward to the Bank Holiday weekend in the hope of attracting more entries. However, a competing Formula Two race at Crystal Palace took away some potential entrants. As a result, ten of the cars that had competed in the European Formula 5000 round earlier in the day joined the eight Formula One cars on the grid.

Although the race regularly attracted the top teams from across Britain and Europe, the increasing costs of F1 and more countries wishing to have their own Grand Prix, the Gold Cup fell by wayside with this being the last true F1 race.

=== Qualifying ===
Peter Gethin took pole position for the Marlboro BRM, in their BRM P160B, averaging a speed of 117.433 mph. Denny Hulme in a McLaren M19A was second fastest, just 0.2 of a second behind. The fastest of the F5000 cars was Alan Rollinson in fifth, in his Alan McKechnie Racing Lola-Chevrolet T300.

=== Race ===
The race was held over 40 laps of the Oulton Park circuit. Denny Hulme took the winner spoils for Yardley Team McLaren, driving their McLaren-Cosworth M19A. Hulme won in a time of 1hr 24.400mins., averaging a speed of 115.408 mph. The second car home was that of Emerson Fittipaldi, for the John Player Team Lotus in their Cosworth powered Lotus 72D. The podium was completed by Tim Schenken, in a Surtees-Cosworth TS9B for Team Surtees outfit albeit one lap adrift. The first F5000 car home was that of Brian Redman in a Sid Taylor Racing entered, Chevron-Chevrolet B24 in fourth.

== Classification ==
Pos	No	Driver	Constructor	Laps	Time/Retired	Grid
1	46	(New Zealand) Denny Hulme	McLaren-Cosworth	40	57:15.6	2
2	44	(Brazil) Emerson Fittipaldi	Lotus-Cosworth	40	+ 37.4 s	3
3	47	(Australia) Tim Schenken	Surtees-Cosworth	39	+1 lap	11
4	1	(United Kingdom) Brian Redman	Chevron-Chevrolet	39	+1 lap	8
5	43	(Australia) Vern Schuppan	BRM	39	+1 lap	6
6	8	(United Kingdom) Ray Allen	McLaren-Chevrolet	38	+2 laps	10
7	4	(United Kingdom) Guy Edwards	McLaren-Chevrolet	38	+2 laps	16
8	6	(United Kingdom) Ian Ashley	Lola-Chevrolet	37	+3 laps	14
9	33	(Belgium) Teddy Pilette	McLaren-Chevrolet	35	+5 laps	12
10	10	(United Kingdom) Ray Calcutt	McLaren-Chevrolet	35	+5 laps	18
NC	21	(United Kingdom) David Prophet	McLaren-Chevrolet	31	+9 laps	13
Ret	25	(United Kingdom) Keith Holland	McLaren-Chevrolet	33	Engine mounting	17
Ret	9	(Netherlands) Gijs van Lennep	Surtees-Chevrolet	30	Shock absorber mounting	15
Ret	45	(Australia) David Walker	Lotus-Cosworth	25	Gearbox	4
Ret	12	(United Kingdom) Alan Rollinson	Lola-Chevrolet	19	Rear cross-member	5
Ret	41	(United Kingdom) Peter Gethin	BRM	10	Wheel bearing seizure	1
Ret	42	(Sweden) Reine Wisell	BRM	2	Accident/Broken finger	7
Ret	48	(Sweden) Ronnie Peterson	March-Cosworth	1	Accident	9

Previous race: 1972 BRDC International Trophy	Formula One non-championship races 1972 season	Next race: 1972 Italian Republic Grand Prix
Previous race: 1971 International Gold Cup	Oulton Park International Gold Cup	Next race: 1973 International Gold Cup
