= Figl Air Base =

Fliegerhorst Leopold Figl – Flugplatz General Pabisch Figl Air Base
- IATA: none; ICAO: LOXT

Summary
- Airport type: Military
- Location: Tulln / Vienna, Austria
- Elevation AMSL: 594 ft (181 m)
- Coordinates: 48°19′16″N 016°06′43″E

Map
- Location of Fliegerhorst Figl in Austria

Runways
Direction	Length		Surface
Direction	m	ft	Surface
08/26	1,400	4,593	Asphalt
08/26			Grass
13/31			Grass
05/23			Grass

Fliegerhorst Leopold Figl – Flugplatz General Pabisch (Figl Air Base) (called Fliegerhorst Brumowski until 14 May 2024) is an Austrian Air Force (German: Österreichische Luftstreitkräfte) base located approximately 5 km (3 mi) east-southeast of Tulln; about 30 km (19 mi) northwest of Vienna.

Figl Air Base is the headquarters of the Luftunterstützungsgeschwader (Air Support Wing). As of mid 2024 the Air Support Wing consists of a medium transport helicopter squadron Sikorsky S-70A-42 Black Hawk, a multi-purpose transport helicopter squadron Bell OH-58B Kiowa, a training and multi-purpose helicopter squadron AgustaWestland AW-169B Lion as well as a fixed-wing squadron Pilatus PC-6 B2H2 Turbo Porter, an air reconnaissance squadron and the ground organization required for flight operations.

In addition, the base also houses the Bundesfachschule für Flugtechnik (Federal School for Aeronautical Engineering) and Fliegerwerft 1, responsible for overhauls and maintenance.

== History ==
=== Luftwaffe ===
The construction of Fliegerhorst Figl was started in June 1938 for the German Air Force (Luftwaffe) and on 1 October 1939, the first military personnel arrived.

When the war with Yugoslavia started in 1941, the airfield served as a jumping off point for aerial attacks against that country. The Air-war School VII, commanded by Major General Volkmann, was established in the summer of 1942. Base strength was about 2000 personnel, including 120 cadets and about 60 officers. The Germans were trained only in light aircraft as part of primary and basic flight training. Aircraft assigned included Klemm Kl 35s and Gotha Go 145s; biplane Arado Ar 66s, Bücker Bü 131 Jungmann, Heinkel He 72s; monoplane Focke Wulf FW 140s and Junkers Ju 87 Stukas; 2 and 3 engine Junkers W34s, Junkers Ju 52s, Junkers Ju 88s, and Heinkel He 111s. In the first week of April 1945, the Russians were moving into Austria and the German forces started pulling out.

=== American operation ===
As part of the Four-Powers agreement and the establishment of occupation zones in Austria, the Soviets occupied the base until 26 July 1945. The Americans took command of the base on the 27th. Under United States control, the facility was called Tulln Air Base and was under the command of the United States Air Forces in Europe (USAFE)'s XII Tactical Air Command. Upon the arrival of American troops at Tulln, the cadre found Russian troops billeted on the base. The field was a mess. The German demolition crews had done their job well. One hangar was in pretty good shape except for the windows and other minor damage. All others were demolished. Bomber and fighter planes were scattered all over the field and all salvageable parts were removed. The major portion of the base was blown to rubble, but one barracks, the headquarters building, the vehicle garages and repair shop and a few other buildings were intact. The usable buildings were a mess with rats, vermin, excrement, and bullet holes everywhere. POW SS troops, guarded by the Rainbow Division, were brought in to do the cleaning up of rubble and housekeeping duties. The first occupation troops at Tulln were assigned to the 10th and 81st Airdrome Squadrons.

The major USAAF units assigned to Tulln Air Base were the troop carrier units from 1946 on, which flew C-47 Skytrains under European Air Transport Service. Until 1947, the individual squadrons were detached to other locations in Germany and Italy. Other American units assigned were:

- 501st Air Service Group, August 1945-1 Jun 1946

743d Air Materiel Squadron
919th Air Engineering Squadron

- 10th Airdrome Squadron, Jul 45 - ca. 11 May 1947
- 18th Airdrome Squadron, Jul 45 - ca. 11 May 1947
- 516th Troop Carrier Group, 10 July 1946 - 30 September 1946

87th Transport Squadron

- 313th Troop Carrier Group, 30 September 1946 – 25 June 1947

29th Troop Carrier Squadron
47th Troop Carrier Squadron
48th Troop Carrier Squadron

- 790th AAF Base Unit (later 790th AF Base Unit), replaced by the 160th AACS Squadron (later the 1948th AACS Squadron), 1 September 1947 - 1 February 1953 (These units operated a system of airways communications and ground electronic aids to air operations to meet the requirements established by their headquarters) In 1945-1946 air traffic control systems were operated by a detachment of the 747th AAF Base Unit.
- 7909th AAF Base Unit, 20 December 1947 -1 July 1948
- Detachment, 61st Troop Carrier Group, 1 July-10 August 1948, Group stationed Rhein-Main AFB, Germany

In addition, Pan American World Airways operated commercial airline service from the airfield (known as Tulln Airport) from May 1946-May 1955.

In December 1947, USAFE activated the 7909th AAF Base Unit to augment the 81st Airdrome Squadron in operating Tulln. On 1 July 1948, all USAFE personnel at Tulln were transferred to the 7360th Base Complement Squadron. During the late 1940s and early 1950s, the mission of the 7360th was to maintain an aerial port of entry in support of Headquarters, USAFE; to include maintenance of a pool of aircraft to be used in the mission of the U.S. High Commissioner, Austria. and to maintain an aerial port of entry for American International air carriers as may be designated by competent authority. Detachments of the 21st Weather Squadron, then the 19th, and finally the 18th Weather Squadron provided weather observation and forecasting service. This unit had Austrian weather civilian personnel in training to reestablish the Austrian Weather Service, which had been disorganized by the war. These trainees continued to work in conjunction with Air Force weather personnel until relieved in early 1950.

=== Return to Austrian control ===
The 7360th Base Complement Squadron was inactivated on 15 March 1954 and control of the base was turned over to the U.S., Allied Commission for Austria (USACA). Remaining USAF Personnel were assigned to Detachment 1, 7351st Air Base Squadron until transfer was complete. After signing of the Peace Treaty between Austria and the Four Powers, Great Britain, France, Soviet Union, and the United States in 1955, Tulln Air Base was handed over to the Austrian police (B-Gendarmerie), because there were no Austrian military services at that time.

The first Austrian aircraft to arrive were Yakovlev Yak-11 "Moose" and Yakovlev Yak-18 "Max-A" trainers donated by the Soviet Union and Agusta Bell AB47G2 helicopters in late 1955. The base was named for Captain Godwin Brumowski in 1967.

The airbase was renamed in April 2024 to Fliegerhorst Leopold Figl – Flugplatz General Pabisch. The Military history Memorial Commission decided to rename the airbase named after the World War I fighter pilot Godwin von Brumowski on the basis of critical historical facts. The commission had submitted proposals by mid-April. The base is named after Dr. Leopold Figl. As Foreign Minister, he signed the Austrian State Treaty in 1955. Figl was appointed the first Federal Chancellor of the Second Republic in 1945. A second historically significant namesake for the airbase is General Othmar Pabisch. Othmar Pabisch was military pilot in the Austrian Air Force and commander of the air division in Langenlebarn from March 1985 to November 1998.
