= 1971 Spring Trophy =

- Non-championship race in the 1971 Formula One season

Race details
- Date: 9 April 1971
- Official name: Rothmans/Daily Express Spring Trophy
- Location: Oulton Park, Cheshire, United Kingdom
- Course: Permanent racing facility
- Course length: 4.441 km (2.760 miles)
- Distance: 40 laps, 177.634 km (110.40 miles)

Pole position
Driver	(United Kingdom) Jackie Stewart	Tyrrell-Cosworth
- Time: 1:25.8

Fastest lap
Drivers	(Mexico) Pedro Rodriguez	BRM
	(United Kingdom) Peter Gethin	BRM
- Time: 1:25.06

Podium
First	(Mexico) Pedro Rodriguez	BRM
Second	(United Kingdom) Peter Gethin	McLaren-Cosworth
Third	(United Kingdom) Jackie Stewart	Tyrrell-Cosworth

The Rothmans/Daily Express Spring Trophy was a non-championship Formula One race held on 9 April 1971 at Oulton Park.

Only twelve cars took part. Team Lotus entered three different chassis types - a 49C, a 72D and the Pratt & Whitney gas-turbine-engined 56B. Local favourite and Formula 3 driver Cyd Williams was entrusted with a Frank Williams Racing Cars March but crashed heavily during untimed practice and did not start the race. Jackie Stewart set pole position in the spare car but in the race itself he struggled with his regular car's handling. Pedro Rodriguez won ahead of Peter Gethin, the two of them sharing fastest lap. Stewart finished third.

== Classification ==
=== Qualifying ===
Pos.	No.	Driver	Entrant	Car	Lap	Gap
1	16	(United Kingdom) Jackie Stewart	Elf Team Tyrrell	Tyrrell 001	1:25.8	–
2	6	(United Kingdom) Peter Gethin	Bruce McLaren Motor Racing	McLaren M14A	1:25.8	+ 0.0
3	3	(Mexico) Pedro Rodriguez	Yardley Team BRM	BRM P160	1:27.0	+ 1.2
4	4	(Switzerland) Jo Siffert	Yardley Team BRM	BRM P153	1:27.4	+ 1.6
5	5	(United Kingdom) John Surtees	Brooke-Bond-Oxo/Rob Walker/Team Surtees	Surtees TS9	1:27.6	+ 1.8
6	2	(New Zealand) Howden Ganley	Yardley Team BRM	BRM P153	1:28.2	+ 2.4
7	10	(Brazil) Emerson Fittipaldi	Gold Leaf Team Lotus	Lotus 72C	1:29.4	+ 3.6
8	8	(United Kingdom) Mike Beuttler	Clarke-Mordaunt-Guthrie Racing	March 701	1:32.2	+ 6.4
9	11	(Sweden) Reine Wisell	Gold Leaf Team Lotus	Lotus 56B	1:33.6	+ 7.8
10	17	(United Kingdom) Tony Trimmer	Gold Leaf Team Lotus	Lotus 49C	1:34.6	+ 8.8
11	14	(United Kingdom) Cyd Williams	Motul/Frank Williams Racing Cars	March 701	1:37.2	+ 11.4
12	15	(United Kingdom) Alan Rollinson	Jo Siffert Automobiles	March 701	1:38.0	+ 12.2
DNA	1	(Sweden) Jo Bonnier	Ecurie Bonnier	McLaren M7C	–	–
DNA	7	(New Zealand) Denis Hulme	Bruce McLaren Motor Racing	McLaren M19A	–	–
DNA	12	(Sweden) Ronnie Peterson	STP March Engineering	March 711	–	–

=== Race ===
Pos.	No.	Driver	Constructor	Laps	Time/Retired	Grid
1	3	(Mexico) Pedro Rodriguez	BRM	40	57:33.4	3
2	6	(United Kingdom) Peter Gethin	McLaren-Cosworth	40	+ 4.6	2
3	16	(United Kingdom) Jackie Stewart	Tyrrell-Cosworth	40	+ 12.2	1
4	2	(New Zealand) Howden Ganley	BRM	39	+ 1 lap	6
5	15	(United Kingdom) Alan Rollinson	March-Cosworth	36	+ 4 laps	12
6	17	(United Kingdom) Tony Trimmer	Lotus-Cosworth	31	+ 9 laps	10
7	10	(Brazil) Emerson Fittipaldi	Lotus-Cosworth	27	+ 13 laps	7
Ret	11	(Sweden) Reine Wisell	Lotus-Pratt & Whitney	17	Puncture	9
Ret	8	(United Kingdom) Mike Beuttler	March-Cosworth	16	Nose cone	8
Ret	4	(Switzerland) Jo Siffert	BRM	13	Ignition	4
Ret	5	(United Kingdom) John Surtees	Surtees-Cosworth	5	Engine	5
DNS	14	(United Kingdom) Cyd Williams	March-Cosworth		Practice Crash	11
DNS	9	(United Kingdom) Jackie Stewart^{1}	Tyrrell-Cosworth		Drove No. 16	

^{1} Stewart practiced in the spare Tyrrell 002 but opted to race Tyrrell 001.

Previous race: 1971 Questor Grand Prix	Formula One non-championship races 1971 season	Next race: 1971 BRDC International Trophy
Previous race: None	Spring Trophy	Next race: None
