= Ray Allen (racing driver) =

British racing driver (1943-2021)

- Born: 12 December 1943; Sutton, London, England
- Died: 15 May 2021 (aged 77)

Formula One World Championship career
- Nationality: (United Kingdom) British
- Active years: 1973
- Team: Speed International
- Entries: 1
- Championships: 0
- Wins: 0
- Podiums: 0
- Career points: 0
- Pole positions: 0
- Fastest laps: 0
- First entry: 1972 British Grand Prix

Ray Allen (12 December 1943 – 15 May 2021) was a racing driver from London, England. He is best known for racing in the European Formula 5000 Championship and various Formula One non-championship races. He won the Tarmac Formula F100 Championship in 1970 and he was a member of the British Racing Drivers' Club.

== Racing record ==
=== Complete European F5000 Championship results ===
(key) (Races in bold indicate pole position; races in italics indicate fastest lap.)

Year	Entrant	Chassis	Engine	1	2	3	4	5	6	7	8	9	10	11	12	13	14	15	16	17	Pos.	Pts
1971	Team Trojan	McLaren M10B	Chevrolet	MAL; 5	SNE; 3	BRH; 3	MON; 4	SIL; Ret	CAS; 4	MAL	MNZ; 3	MAL; 6	THR; 5	SIL; DNS	OUL; Ret	SNE	HOC; 5	OUL; 5	BRH; 5	BRH; 7	7th	30
1972	Racing Team V.D.S.	McLaren M18	Chevrolet	BRH; 4		SNE; 5	BRH; 10	NIV; 3	SIL; 5	MON	OUL; 5	MAL; Ret	BRH; 5	SIL; 8	BRH; 3	OUL					6th	23
1972	Racing Team V.D.S.	Surtees TS11	Chevrolet		MAL; 3																6th	23
1972	Chris Featherstone	McLaren M10B	Chevrolet														BRH; 9				6th	23
1973	Servis Racing Team	Surtees TS8	Chevrolet	BRH; Ret	MAL; 3	SIL; 14	SNE	BRH	OUL	MAL	MIS	MAL	MON	SIL	BRH						20th	12
1973	Jackie Epstein	Lola T330	Chevrolet													OUL; Ret	JYL	ZAN	SNE	BRH	20th	12

=== Complete Formula One World Championship results ===
(key) (Races in bold indicate pole position; races in italics indicate fastest lap)

Year	Entrant	Chassis	Engine	1	2	3	4	5	6	7	8	9	10	11	12	WDC	Pts
1972	Speed International	March 711	Cosworth V8	ARG	RSA	ESP	MON	BEL	FRA	GBR; DNA	GER	AUT	ITA	CAN	USA	NC	0

=== Non-Championship results ===
(key) (Races in bold indicate pole position; races in italics indicate fastest lap)

Year	Entrant	Chassis	Engine	1	2	3	4	5	6	7	8
1971	Frank Williams Racing Cars	March 701	Ford Cosworth V8	ARG		QUE	SPR	INT; Ret		OUL; Ret	VIC; 17
1971	Team Trojan	McLaren M10B (F5000)	Chevrolet V8		ROC; 6				RIN; Ret		
1972	Speed International	McLaren M18 (F5000)	Chevrolet V8	ROC; 14	BRA	INT; Ret	OUL; 6	REP	VIC; Ret		
1973	Servis Racing	Surtees TS8 (F5000)	Chevrolet V8	ROC; 8	INT; Ret						
