= Keith Holland =

British racing driver (born 1935)

- Nationality: British
- Born: 6 December 1935 (age 90) Maidstone, UK
- Retired: c.1979
- Years active: 1961–1978
- Best finish: 3rd; European Formula 5000 Championship in 1973 and 1976

Keith Holland (born 6 December 1935) is a British former racing driver from England who competed in various classes of racing in the 1960s and 1970s. He is known for winning the 1969 Madrid Grand Prix in a Formula 5000 car in a field which contained several Formula One entries. He was also a regular competitor in the European Formula 5000 Championship finishing third in the title standings on two occasions.

== Racing career ==
=== Early career ===
Holland's career began in 1961, with a Lotus 11, yielding a third-place finish in the Boxing Day meeting at Brands Hatch. He continued in 1962, with a GSM Delta competing in only three national level, or above, races. He achieved a best finish of fourth at a 500km race at the Nürburgring in September. In 1963, Holland entered the Guards Trophy (S2.0 class) at Brands Hatch in a Diva GT but did not finish.

Holland next appeared at national level in the 1967 Brands Hatch six-hour race. He competed alongside entrant Terry Drury in a Ford GT40 and finished 14th. Although Holland entered other events in 1967, he did not actually compete in them. In 1968, Holland again entered the Brands Hatch six-hour race, together with the Monza 1000 km race, in Drury's GT40, but did not finish either event. The pairing then entered the Targa Florio with the Ford and were classified 54th, followed by the 1000km of Nürburgring, finishing 35th. Holland then returned to domestic racing with a Lotus 47 before competing in a six-hour race at Surfers Paradise in an Austin Mini Cooper, finishing fifth. He then finished 12th in the Guards Trophy at Brands Hatch with the Lotus 47, and was entered for the 1968 24 Hours of Le Mans alongside Drury in the GT40, but did not attend.

=== 1969 Madrid Grand Prix ===
Holland took part in the 1969 Madrid Grand Prix at Jarama with a Formula 5000 Lola T142-Chevrolet V8 entered by Alan Fraser. The race was originally intended as a full-scale Grand Prix-type event as the Spanish Grand Prix had been moved to Barcelona. However, a clash of dates meant that a relatively small mixed field of F5000 and F1 cars took part. Holland led early in the race, after Tony Dean (BRM P261) spun at the start, but was passed by Peter Gethin in an F5000 McLaren-Chevrolet. Towards the end, Holland had to drop back slightly due to water temperature issues, but on the last lap, Gethin's Chevrolet engine broke a connecting-rod and despite spinning on his own final lap, Holland was able to win the race.

1969 also saw Holland enter the French Formula Three Championship with Fraser's Brabham BT15 and finish eighth in the Oulton Park Gold Cup with the Lola T142. He competed in the British Formula Three Championship in a Brabham BT21 finishing 27th in the title standings with three points. However, his 1969 Guards Formula 5000 Championship season was more successful, achieving fourth place in the championship, with six podium finishes.

In 1970, Holland entered the Australian Grand Prix (at that time run to F5000 rules) in a McLaren M10B-Chevrolet. He qualified in eighth position but retired after nine laps with an oil-pump problem. He also competed in the British F5000 championship in Fraser's Lola, finishing in 12th place in the standings with eight points from five races.

=== Formula 5000 ===
In 1971, Holland competed in three races in the Tasman Series with the Mclaren-Chevrolet entered by Road & Track Auto Services. He was classified 14th in the title standings with two points. He participated in the 1971 Rothmans F5000 European Championship with the McLaren finishing in 16th place with four points from eight races. At the 1971 World Championship Victory Race, Holland was classified 15th, in the McLaren, in a race stopped at 15 laps following a fatal accident to Jo Siffert.

Holland entered the 1972 International Gold Cup with the McLaren-Chevrolet. He did not finish, retiring after 31 laps with broken engine mountings. He subsequently participated in the Rothmans 50,000 race at Brands Hatch with a Lola T190 (F5000) entered by Chris Featherstone. He qualified in 29th position and thus took part in the main race, for the first 30 qualifiers, where he finished 13th but 12 laps behind. At the John Player Challenge Trophy, Holland finished 11th in a Chevron B24 entered by Sid Taylor Racing. In the 1972 British F5000 championship, Holland competed in eight races and was classified eighth in the championship with 16 points. He achieved two podium finishes and two fastest laps. In the 1972 World Championship Victory Race, he finished 11th in a Chevron B24.

In 1973, Holland finished third in the 1973 Rothmans 5000 European Championship, using both a Trojan T101 and a Lola T190 entered by Ian Ward Racing. He achieved a total of 116 points from 15 races, with wins at Mallory Park and Mondello Park, each with the Trojan. He had one further podium finish together with two pole positions and two fastest laps. At the 1973 International Trophy, Holland finished 10th with the Trojan and at the 1973 Race of Champions qualified 11th but did not finish due to a rear wing problem.

In the 1974 Rothmans 5000 European Championship, Holland dropped to 19th in the title standings with 20 points from eight races, including two podium finishes, and used both a Trojan T102 and a Lola T332. Entries were made for the 1974 Race of Champions and the International Trophy but Holland did not start at either event. However, co-driven by Tony Birchenhough and Brian Joscelyne he achieved a tenth-place finish in the Brands Hatch 1,000km race using a Lola T294, but again paired with Birchenhough, did not finish the Kyalami six-hour race.

The 1975 ShellSPORT 5000 European Championship saw Holland finish in 25th position with 10 points, having only competed in one event. However, in 1976, with the series renamed as Shellsport International and run to Formula Libre rules, Holland finished third in the standings using a Lola T400, with a win at Brands Hatch in October, three other podium finishes and two pole positions.

Holland began the 1977 series with a second place at Mallory Park but achieved only one other podium-finish and dropped to eighth in the championship with 63 points.

In 1978, Holland competed in the Rothmans International Series which was part of the Australian Formula 1 category and at that time included cars to F5000 specification. He finished 10th in the championship with 3 points from four races.

== Personal life ==
The winning car from the 1969 Madrid Grand Prix was restored in 2004 as part of the UK television series Salvage Squad. Holland made a brief appearance in the programme.

== Racing record ==
=== Complete European F5000 Championship results ===
(key) (Races in bold indicate pole position; races in italics indicate fastest lap.)

Year	Entrant	Chassis	Engine	1	2	3	4	5	6	7	8	9	10	11	12	13	14	15	16	17	18	19	20	Pos.	Pts
1969	Alan Fraser Racing Team	Lola T142	Chevrolet 5.0 V8	OUL; 3	BRH; 2	BRH; 3	MAL; 9	SIL; 6	MON; 4	KOK; 3	ZAN; 4	SNE; 8	HOC; 5	OUL; 3	BRH; 3									4th	2000 (2445)
1970	Alan Fraser Racing Team	Lola T142	Chevrolet 5.0 V8	OUL	BRH; 5	ZOL	ZAN	SIL	BRH; Ret	CAS; 5	MAL	MON; 5	SIL	MNZ	AND; 5	SAL	THR	SIL	OUL	SNE	HOC	OUL	BRH	12th	8
1971	Keith Holland	McLaren M10B	Chevrolet 5.0 V8	MAL; Ret	SNE	BRH; Ret	MON	SIL	CAS	MAL; 7	MNZ; 4	MAL; Ret	THR	SIL	OUL	SNE	HOC; Ret	OUL	BRH; Ret	BRH; 6				16th	4
1972	Keith Holland	McLaren M10B	Chevrolet 5.0 V8	BRH; Ret	MAL; 2	SNE; Ret	BRH; Ret	NIV	SIL	MON; 3	OUL; 4	MAL; Ret	BRH; 4	SIL	BRH	OUL	BRH							8th	16
1973	Ian Ward Racing	Trojan T101	Chevrolet 5.0 V8	BRH; Ret	MAL; 6	SIL; Ret	SNE; Ret	BRH; 7	OUL; 6	**MAL**; 1	MIS; C	MAL; DNS	**MON**; 1	SIL; C	BRH; 5	OUL; Ret	JYL; 5	ZAN; 7	SNE; 4	BRH; 2				3rd	116
1973	Chris Featherstone	Lola T190X	Chevrolet 5.0 V8									MAL; Ret												3rd	116
1974	Ian Ward Racing	Trojan T102	Chevrolet 5.0 V8	BRH; DNS	MAL; Ret	SIL; DNS	OUL	BRH; Ret	ZOL; NC	THR; 6	ZAN; Ret	MUG	MNZ											19th	20
1974	Embassy Racing with John Butterworth	Lola T332	Chevrolet 5.0 V8											MAL; Ret	MON	THR	BRH	OUL; 3	SNE; 9	MAL				19th	20
1974	Bill Wood	Trojan T101	Chevrolet 5.0 V8																		BRH; DNS			19th	20
1975	John Turner	Lola T330	Chevrolet 5.0 V8	BRH	OUL	BRH	SIL	ZOL	ZAN	THR	SNE	MAL	THR	BRH; 4	OUL	SIL	SNE	MAL	BRH					25th	10

=== Complete Formula One non-championship results ===
(key)

Year	Entrant	Chassis	Engine	1	2	3	4	5	6	7	8
1969	Alan Fraser Racing Team	Lola T142 (F5000)	Chevrolet 5.0 V8	ROC	INT	MAD; 1	OUL; 8				
1971	Keith Holland	McLaren M10B (F5000)	Chevrolet 5.0 V8	ARG	ROC	QUE	SPR	INT	RIN	OUL	VIC; 15
1972	Keith Holland	McLaren M10B (F5000)	Chevrolet 5.0 V8	ROC; DNS	BRA	INT	OUL; Ret	REP			
1972	Sid Taylor Racing	Chevron B24 (F5000)	Chevrolet 5.0 V8						VIC; 11		
1973	Ian Ward Racing	Trojan T101 (F5000)	Chevrolet 5.0 V8	ROC; Ret	INT; 10						
1974	Ian Ward Racing	Trojan T102 (F5000)	Chevrolet 5.0 V8	PRE	ROC; DNS	INT; DNS					

=== Complete Shellsport International Series results ===
(key) (Races in bold indicate pole position; races in italics indicate fastest lap.)

Year	Entrant	Chassis	Engine	1	2	3	4	5	6	7	8	9	10	11	12	13	14	Pos.	Pts
1976	E. L. Gibbs Ltd. Racing	Lola T400	Chevrolet 5.0 V8	MAL	SNE	OUL; 2	BRH; 8	THR; 6	BRH; Ret	MAL; 2	**SNE**; 4	BRH; Ret	THR; 6	OUL; 3	**BRH**; 1	BRH; 5		3rd	95
1977	E. L. Gibbs Racing	Lola T332C	Chevrolet 5.0 V8	MAL; 2	SNE; 4	OUL; Ret	BRH; 6	MAL; 4	THR; 3	BRH; Ret	OUL	MAL	DON					8th	63
1977	Chris Featherstone	McRae GM1	Chevrolet 5.0 V8											BRH; 4	THR; Ret	SNE; Ret	BRH; NC	8th	63
