= David Walker (racing driver) =

Australian racing driver (1941–2024)

Dave Walker
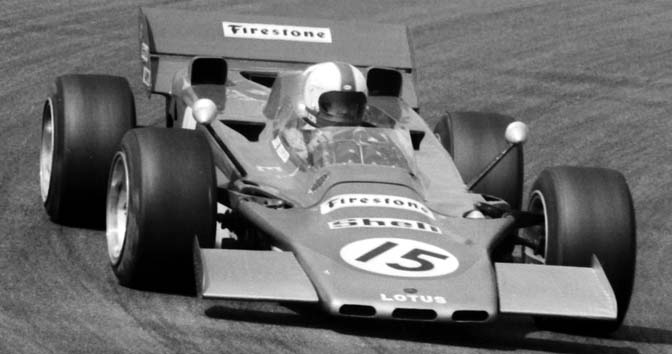
- Walker at the wheel of the Lotus 56B Formula One car during the 1971 Dutch Grand Prix
- Born: 10 June 1941; Sydney, New South Wales, Australia
- Died: 24 May 2024 (aged 82); Queensland, Australia

Formula One World Championship career
- Nationality: (Australia) Australian
- Active years: 1971 – 1972
- Team: Team Lotus
- Entries: 11
- Championships: 0
- Wins: 0
- Podiums: 0
- Career points: 0
- Pole positions: 0
- Fastest laps: 0
- First entry: 1971 Dutch Grand Prix
- Last entry: 1972 United States Grand Prix

David Walker (10 June 1941 – 24 May 2024) was an Australian racing driver who drove for Lotus in the 1971 and 1972 Formula One World Championships.

Walker died in Queensland on 24 May 2024, aged 82.

== Career ==
Walker had some international racing experience early in his career in the Australian rounds of the Tasman series in 1964–65 on challenging tracks like Longford and Sandown at a time when most Australian National 2.5 drives were near world class and he also finished fifth in the ex-George Follmer Lotus 70 in the November 1970 Australian Grand Prix at Warwick Farm. While few would have been surprised Walker failed to match the fastest Australian F5000 drivers (Frank Matich, Neil Allen and Kevin Bartlett), it was a pointer to Walker's later big car problems that at Warwick Farm he was slower than Australia's leading 2-litre single seater exponents, Kevin Bartlett, Max Stewart and Leo Geoghegan.

During the 1960s, Walker's racing career faltered (he was the 1969 British Formula Ford Champion and finished third in the 1969 European Formula Ford Championship), however finally broke through racing a works Team Lotus Formula Three car in 1970 and 1971. Walker dominated Formula 3 in those years against strong opposition, including from James Hunt, who found Walker's later failure in F1 inexplicable. He won 25 out of 32 races in 1971, including the Formula Three support races at the Monaco and British Grands Prix. By the end of the year, Walker had won both the Shell and Forward Trust UK Formula Three titles. In his initial non championship races in a Lotus 72 in early 1971 at the Race of Champion at Brands Hatch and at Hockenheim, Walker qualified only on the third row and was no faster than John Miles in a BRM P160, who Walker had effectively replaced in the Lotus team.

Lotus founder Colin Chapman, was contractually bound by his British Imperial Tobacco sponsors (who rated Walker highly) to put Walker in F1. When Walker won the 1971 F3 championship, Chapman gave Walker a full season ride in the Lotus F1 team. Imperial Tobacco wanted Walker to lead the team in 1972, believing Emerson Fittipaldi's form was patchy and he had not done enough. Walker was handed his Formula One debut at the 1971 Dutch Grand Prix, at the wheel of the Lotus 56B. During the rain-affected race, Walker used the turbine car's advantages of four wheel drive and superior torque to rise from his starting position of 22nd to tenth place within five laps, but eventually spun off into retirement. The Lotus team management, Chapman and Manager Peter Warr, were less than impressed, as they thought the Lotus 56 had an overwhelming advantage in the conditions and Firestone tyres well suited to the rain, and thought, had Walker taken a more cautious approach, he was almost guaranteed victory.

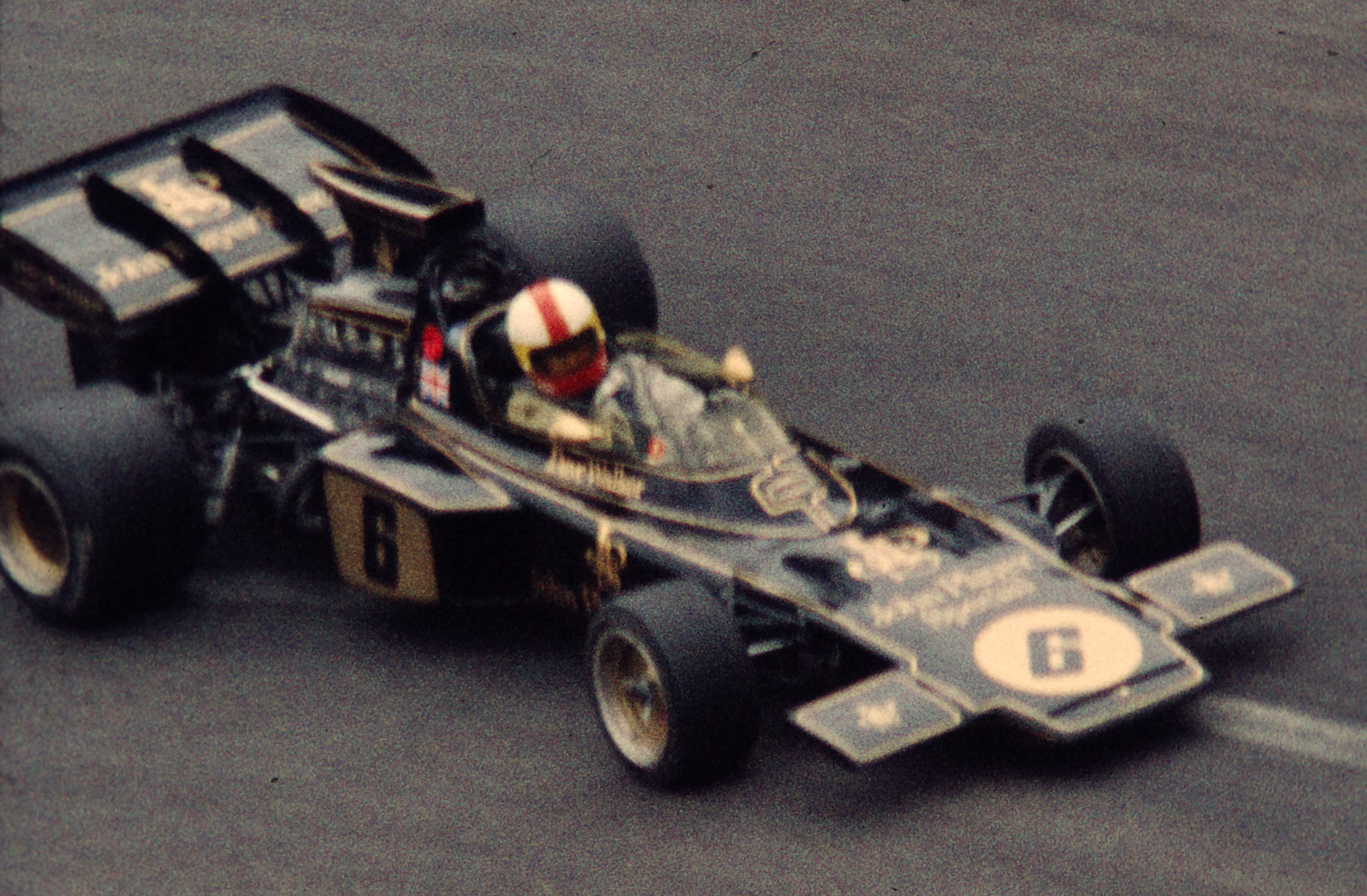
Walker driving at the 1972 French Grand Prix

Walker was given a full-time Formula One seat in the Lotus 72 in the 1972 season, as number two driver to Fittipaldi. As the season went on, however, both Walker and the team became increasingly disenchanted. After Lotus discovered Walker had tested a Formula Two car for another team, he was dropped from the team for the Italian and the Canadian Grands Prix, where he was replaced by Reine Wisell. Chapman said Lotus had never really considered Walker an F1 driver, but he was actually a lot quicker than they anticipated. Walker was back for the trip to America, as No 3 for the US GP, where he retired.

In all, Walker managed a fifth in the non championship round in Brazil. At the 1972 South African Grand Prix, he started 19th, passed ten cars and was closing on 6th-place Graham Hill when he ran out of fuel. Team Manager Warr said Walker drove the Lotus 72 like a F3 car, and never adapted to the smoother approach required to race in F1. Walker never finished a Grand Prix higher than ninth (at the 1972 Spanish Grand Prix). Walker was promising in the opening laps at Monaco where he had F3 experience, but made mistakes in the extraordinary downpour. By mid season Team Lotus was totally focused on Fittipaldi taking the Championship, and Walker's 72 was of little importance, but predictably his form at Brands Hatch and in Austria suggested some improvement. When on form, his 72 ran tail out as Ronnie Peterson would drive the car the following year. This continued until an increasingly annoyed and fist waving Fittipaldi was allowed thru by Walker. His race effectively ended the following lap when he came up to lap backmarker Niki Lauda in an uncompetitive March 722. Lotus blamed Walker's allegedly inadequate driving technique, poor fitness, and lack of mechanical sensitivity; Walker claimed Lotus gave him inferior equipment and gave far more attention to Fittipaldi's needs than his. He was not retained for the 1973 season, and was replaced by Peterson. David Walker remains the only driver not to score a single Formula One Championship point in the same season his teammate won the drivers' title.

== Racing results ==
=== Career summary ===
Season	Series	Position	Car	Team
1963	Australian Formula Junior Championship	4th	Brabham BT2 - Ford	Scuderia Veloce
1964	Australian Formula 2 Championship	**2nd**	Brabham BT2 - Ford	
1969	BRSCC Formula Ford 1600	**1st**	Lotus 61 - Ford	Holbay
1969	European Formula Ford Championship	**3rd**	Lotus 61 - Ford	Holbay
1970	BRSCC Lombank Formula 3 Britain	**1st**	Lotus 59A - Ford	Gold Leaf Team Lotus
1970	BRSCC Motor Sport / Shell Formula 3 Britain	**2nd**	Lotus 59 - Ford	Gold Leaf Team Lotus
1971	Shell Super Oil British F3 Championship	**1st**	Lotus 69 - Ford	Gold Leaf Team Lotus
1971	Forward Trust BARC F3	**1st**	Lotus 69 - Ford	Gold Leaf Team Lotus

=== Complete Formula One World Championship results ===
(key)

Year	Entrant	Chassis	Engine	1	2	3	4	5	6	7	8	9	10	11	12	13	14	WDC	Points
1971	Gold Leaf Team Lotus	Lotus 56B	Pratt & Whitney STN76 TBN	RSA	ESP	MON	NED; Ret	FRA	GBR	GER	AUT	ITA	CAN	USA				NC	0
1972	John Player Team Lotus	Lotus 72D	Ford Cosworth DFV 3.0 V8	ARG; DSQ	RSA; 10	ESP; 9	MON; 14	BEL; 14	FRA; 18	GBR; Ret	GER; Ret	AUT; Ret	ITA	CAN	USA; Ret			NC	0
1975	Citizen Maki F1	Maki F101C	Ford Cosworth DFV 3.0 V8	ARG	BRA	RSA	ESP	MON	BEL; WD	SWE; WD	NED	FRA	GBR	GER	AUT	ITA	USA	NC	0

=== Non-Championship Formula One results ===
(key) (Races in bold indicate pole position) (Races in italics indicate fastest lap)

Year	Entrant	Chassis	Engine	1	2	3	4	5	6	7	8
1971	Gold Leaf Team Lotus	Lotus 56B*	Pratt & Whitney Turbine	ARG	ROC	QST	SPT	INT	JRG; DNS		
1971	Gold Leaf Team Lotus	Lotus 72*	Ford Cosworth V8						JRG; 9	IGC	WCV
1972	John Player Team Lotus	Lotus 72	Ford Cosworth V8	ROC; 9	BRA; 5	INT; DNS	IGC; Ret	IREP	WCV		
1975	RAM Racing	Chevron B28	Chevrolet V8	ROC; DNQ	INT	SUI					

* Walker was entered in the 1971 Jochen Rindt Gedächtnisrennen in a Lotus 56B, but the car suffered an engine fire during practice, so Walker took over Tony Trimmer's Lotus 72 for the race.

== Sources ==
- Lotus 72 - Formula One Icon by Michael Oliver (Coterie Press, 2004)
- Oliver, Michael (June 2004). "Up in Smoke". Motor Sport magazine.
- Forix
- Grandprix.com

Sporting positions
Preceded by Emerson Fittipaldi (Combined championship)	British Formula 3 Championship; BRSCC Lombank Series Champion; 1970	Succeeded by Roger Williamson
Preceded by Tony Trimmer	Monaco Formula Three; Race winner 1971	Succeeded by Patrick Depailler
Preceded by Carlos Pace	British Formula 3 Championship; BARC Series Champion; 1971	Succeeded by Roger Williamson
Preceded by Tony Trimmer	British Formula 3 Championship; BRSCC Motorsport/Shell Series Champion; 1971	Succeeded by Roger Williamson
