= 1971 Rothmans F5000 European Championship =

Motor Racing Series in Europe

Seasons
- ← 1970 1972 →

The 1971 Rothmans F5000 European Championship was a motor racing series for Formula 5000 cars. The series was organized in the United Kingdom by the British Racing and Sports Car Club but also included European rounds. It was the third of seven annual European Formula 5000 Championships to be contested between 1969 and 1975, and the first to carry the Rothmans F5000 European Championship name. The championship was won by Frank Gardner, driving a Lola T192 and a Lola T300.

== Calendar ==
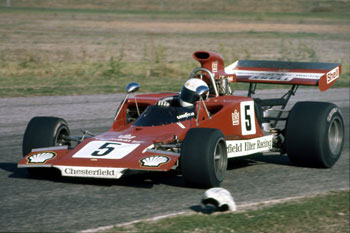
Frank Gardner won the championship driving a Lola T300, similar to that pictured above, and a Lola T192

.

The championship was contested over seventeen rounds.

Round	Name	Circuit	Date	Winning driver	Car
1		(United Kingdom) Mallory Park	28 March	(United Kingdom) Mike Hailwood	Surtees TS8 Chevrolet
2		(United Kingdom) Snetterton	9 April	(Australia) Frank Gardner	Lola T192 Chevrolet
3	Yellow Pages Trophy	(United Kingdom) Brands Hatch	12 April	(United Kingdom) Brian Redman	McLaren M18 Chevrolet
4	Dublin Grand Prix	(Republic of Ireland) Mondello Park	2 May	(Australia) Frank Gardner	Lola T192 Chevrolet
5	Daily Express International Trophy (Report)	(United Kingdom) Silverstone	8 May	(United Kingdom) Mike Hailwood ‡	Surtees TS8 Chevrolet
6		(United Kingdom) Castle Combe	15 May	(Australia) Frank Gardner	Lola T192 Chevrolet
7		(United Kingdom) Mallory Park	31 May	(New Zealand) Graham McRae	McLaren M10B Chevrolet
8	GP della Lotteria di Monza	(Italy) Monza	20 June	(United Kingdom) Alan Rollinson	Surtees TS8 Chevrolet
9	Yellow Pages Trophy	(United Kingdom) Mallory Park	4 July	(United Kingdom) Mike Hailwood	Surtees TS8 Chevrolet
10	Kodak Super 8 Trophy	(United Kingdom) Thruxton	1 August	(New Zealand) Graham McRae	McLaren M10B Chevrolet
11	Uniflo Trophy	(United Kingdom) Silverstone	14 August	(United Kingdom) Mike Hailwood	Surtees TS8 Chevrolet
12	Rothmans International Gold Cup	(United Kingdom) Oulton Park	21 August	(Australia) Frank Gardner #	Lola T300 Chevrolet
13	The Rothmans Trophy Race	(United Kingdom) Snetterton	30 August	(New Zealand) Graham McRae	McLaren M10B Chevrolet
14	Nations Grand Prix	(West Germany) Hockenheim	12 September	(Australia) Frank Gardner	Lola T300 Chevrolet
15		(United Kingdom) Oulton Park	18 September	(Australia) Frank Gardner	Lola T300 Chevrolet
16		(United Kingdom) Brands Hatch	26 September	(United Kingdom) Brian Redman	McLaren M18 Chevrolet
17	Rothmans World Championship Victory Race (Report)	(United Kingdom) Brands Hatch	24 October	(United Kingdom) Alan Rollinson @	Surtees TS8 Chevrolet

- ‡ Mike Hailwood was the highest placed Formula 5000 driver at Round 5 in a combined field of Formula 5000 and Formula One cars.
- # Frank Gardner was the highest placed Formula 5000 driver at Round 12 in a combined field of Formula 5000 and Formula One cars.
- @ Alan Rollinson was the highest placed Formula 5000 driver at Round 17 in a combined field of Formula 5000 and Formula One cars.

== Points system ==
Championship points were awarded on a 9-6-4-3-2-1 basis for the first six places at each round. Final championship positions were determined from the best six results from the longer rounds (i.e. those contested over a distance of 100 to 150 miles) and the best six results from the shorter rounds.

== Championship standings ==
Position	Driver	Car	Entrant	Points
1	(Australia) Frank Gardner	Lola T192 Chevrolet; Lola T300 Chevrolet	Lola Cars Limited	95
2	(United Kingdom) Mike Hailwood	Surtees TS8 Chevrolet	Team Surtees	58
3	(United Kingdom) Mike Walker	Lola T192 Chevrolet	Doug Hardwick	40
4	(United Kingdom) Alan Rollinson	Surtees TS8 Chevrolet	Alan McKechnie Racing	35
5	(United Kingdom) Brian Redman	McLaren M18 Chevrolet	Syd Taylor Team Castrol	34
6	(New Zealand) Graham McRae	McLaren M10B Chevrolet	Crown Lynn Potteries	33
7	(United Kingdom) Ray Allen	McLaren M10B Chevrolet	Team Trojan	30
8	(Belgium) Teddy Pilette	McLaren M10B Chevrolet	Racing Team VDS	18
9	(United Kingdom) Trevor Taylor	Leda LT25 Chevrolet	Malaya Garage Racing Division	16
10	(United Kingdom) David Prophet	McLaren M10B Chevrolet	Bugie Prophet	10
11	(United Kingdom) Tony Dean	McLaren M7A Chevrolet	Barry Newman Racing	9
12	(United Kingdom) Peter Gethin	McLaren M18 Chevrolet	Syd Taylor	7
13	(Sweden) Ulf Norinder	McLaren M18 Chevrolet	Team Trojan	6
14	(United Kingdom) Fred Saunders	Crosslé 15F Rover	Mermaid Racing	5
=	(United Kingdom) John Myerscough	McLaren M10B Chevrolet	John Butterworth	5
16	(France) Jean-Pierre Jaussaud	McLaren M18 Chevrolet	Barry Newman	4
=	(New Zealand) Howden Ganley	McLaren M18 Chevrolet	Barry Newman	4
=	(United Kingdom) Keith Holland	McLaren M10B Chevrolet	Keith Holland	4
=	(United Kingdom) Tony Trimmer	Surtees TS5A Chevrolet; Lola T190 Chevrolet	Kaye Griffiths	4
=	(United Kingdom) Gordon Spice	McLaren M10B Chevrolet	Gordon Spice Cash and Carry	4
21	(United Kingdom) Jock Russell	Lotus 70 Ford	Jock Russell	2
22	(United Kingdom) Rob Taylor	Kitchiner K3A Ford		1
23	(United Kingdom) David Berry	Brabham BT16 Rover	David Berry	1
