= 1972 Rothmans F5000 European Championship =

Seasons
- ← 1971 1973 →

The 1972 Rothmans F5000 European Championship was a motor racing series for Formula 5000 cars. The series was organized in the United Kingdom by the British Racing and Sports Car Club but also included rounds in Belgium and Ireland. It was the fourth European Formula 5000 Championship, and the second to be contested under the Rothmans F5000 European Championship name. The championship was won by Gijs van Lennep, driving a Surtees TS11 and a McLaren M18.

== Calendar ==
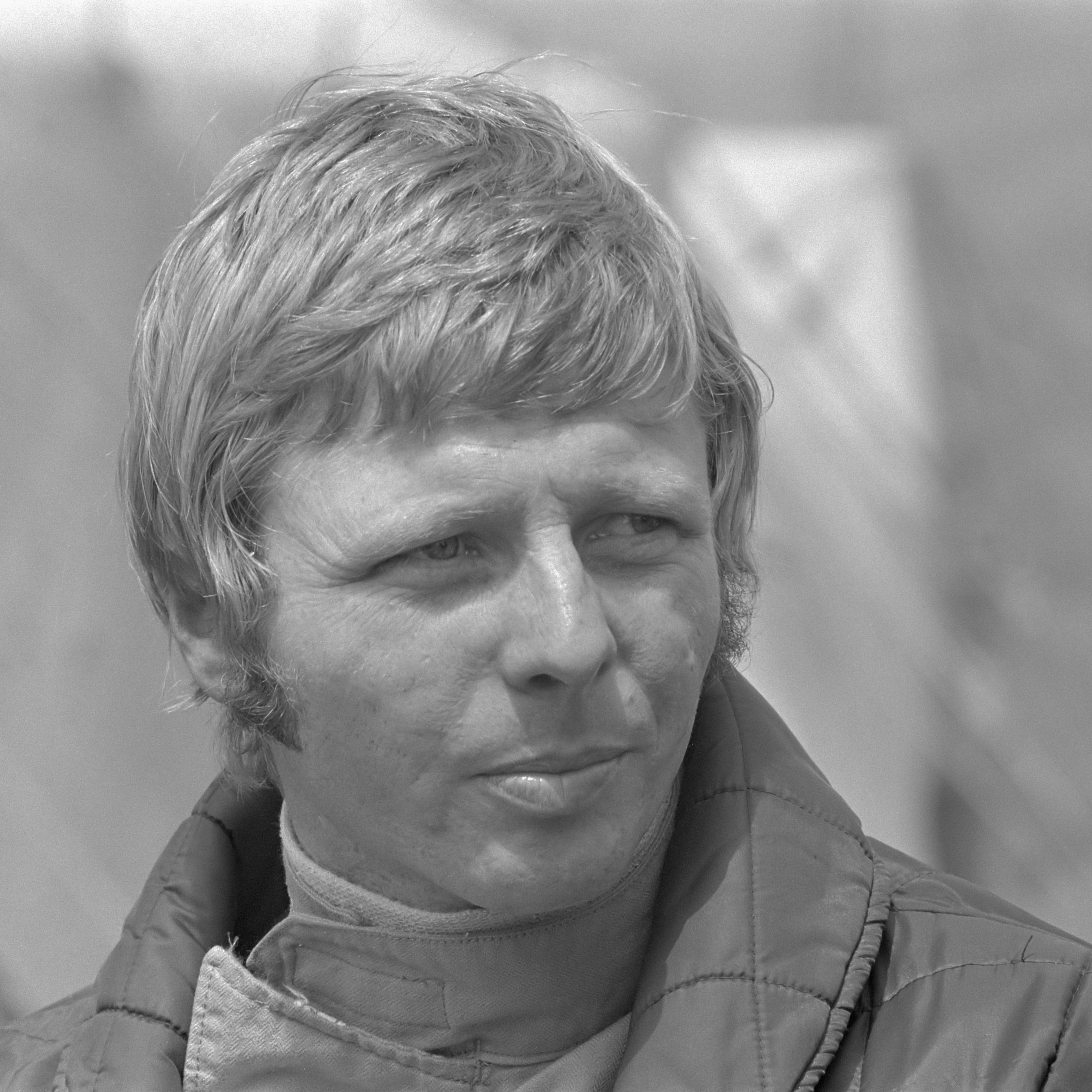
Gijs van Lennep won the championship driving a Surtees TS11 and a McLaren M18

The championship was contested over fourteen rounds.

Round	Name	Circuit	Date	Winning driver	Car
1	Brands Hatch Rothmans F5000	(United Kingdom) Brands Hatch	18 March	(United Kingdom) Brian Redman	McLaren M10B Chevrolet
2	Mallory Park Rothmans F5000	(United Kingdom) Mallory Park	26 March	(United Kingdom) Alan Rollinson	Lola T300 Chevrolet
3	Snetterton Rothmans F5000	(United Kingdom) Snetterton	31 March	(Netherlands) Gijs van Lennep	Surtees TS11 Chevrolet
4	Brands Hatch Rothmans F5000	(United Kingdom) Brands Hatch	3 April	(New Zealand) Graham McRae	Leda GM1 Chevrolet
5	Trophée de la Mer	(Belgium) Nivelles	9 April	(New Zealand) Graham McRae	Leda GM1 Chevrolet
6	GKN Vanwall Trophy	(United Kingdom) Silverstone	22 April	(New Zealand) Graham McRae	Leda GM1 Chevrolet
7	Dublin Grand Prix	(Republic of Ireland) Mondello Park	30 April	(United Kingdom) Brian Redman	McLaren M10B Chevrolet
8	Oulton Park Rothmans F5000	(United Kingdom) Oulton Park	29 May	(United Kingdom) Brian Redman	Chevron B24 Chevrolet
9	Mallory Park Rothmans F5000	(United Kingdom) Mallory Park	18 June	(United Kingdom) Steve Thompson	Surtees TS8 Chevrolet
10	Charles Heidsieck Challenge Trophy	(United Kingdom) Brands Hatch	13 July	(New Zealand) Graham McRae	McRae GM1 Chevrolet
11	Silverstone Rothmans F5000	(United Kingdom) Silverstone	6 August	(Netherlands) Gijs van Lennep	Surtees TS11 Chevrolet
12	Brands Hatch Rothmans F5000	(United Kingdom) Brands Hatch	24 September	(United Kingdom) Alan Rollinson	Lola T300 Chevrolet
13	Oulton Park Rothmans F5000	(United Kingdom) Oulton Park	14 October	(New Zealand) Graham McRae	McRae GM1 Chevrolet
14	Brands Hatch Rothmans F5000	(United Kingdom) Brands Hatch	21 October	(United Kingdom) Brian Redman	Chevron B24 Chevrolet

== Points system ==
Championship points were awarded on a 9-6-4-3-2-1 basis for the first six places at each of the first thirteen rounds and on an 18-12-10-8-6-4-2 basis for the first six places at the final round.

== Championship standings ==
Position	Driver	Car	Entrant	Points
1	(Netherlands) Gijs van Lennep	Surtees TS11 Chevrolet; McLaren M18 Chevrolet	Speed International Racing	65
2	(United Kingdom) Brian Redman	McLaren M10B Chevrolet; Chevron B24 Chevrolet	Sid Taylor	61
3	(New Zealand) Graham McRae	Leda GM1 Chevrolet; McRae GM1 Chevrolet	Crown Lynn Potteries	57
4	(United Kingdom) Alan Rollinson	Lola T300 Chevrolet; Kitchmac Chevrolet	Alan McKenchnie Racing	51
5	(Belgium) Teddy Pilette	McLaren M18 Chevrolet; McLaren M22 Chevrolet	Racing Team VDS	25
6	(United Kingdom) Ray Allen	McLaren M18 Chevrolet; Surtees TS11 Chevrolet	Speed International Racing	23
7	(United Kingdom) Steve Thompson	Surtees TS8 Chevrolet	Alan Brodie	19
8	(United Kingdom) Keith Holland	McLaren M10B Chevrolet		16
9	(Canada) John Cannon	March 725 Oldsmobile		15
10	(Australia) Frank Gardner	Lola T330 Chevrolet	Lola Cars	8
11	(United Kingdom) Ian Ashley	Lola T190 Chevrolet	Rocky Plumridge	6
=	(United Kingdom) David Prophet	McLaren M18 Chevrolet; McLaren M10B Chevrolet	Speed International Racing	6
13	(United Kingdom) Clive Santo	McLaren M10B Chevrolet		5
14	(United Kingdom) Gordon Spice	Kitchmac Chevrolet		4
15	(United Kingdom) Fred Saunders	Crosslé 15F Rover	Mermaid Racing	3
16	(United Kingdom) Guy Edwards	McLaren M10B Chevrolet	John Butterworth	2
=	(Switzerland) Pierre Soukry	McLaren M10B Chevrolet		2
=	(United Kingdom) Roger Williamson	Kitchmac Chevrolet		2
19	(United Kingdom) Ray Calcutt	McLaren M18 Chevrolet	Speed International Racing	1
