= 1973 Rothmans 5000 European Championship =

Seasons
- ← 1972 1974 →

The 1973 Rothmans 5000 European Championship was a motor racing series for Formula 5000 cars. The series was organized in the United Kingdom by the British Racing and Sports Car Club but also incorporated European rounds. It was the fifth in an annual sequence of European Formula 5000 Championships, and the first to be contested as the Rothmans 5000 European Championship. The 1973 championship was won by Teddy Pilette, driving a McLaren M18 and a Chevron B24.

The championship was open to Formula 5000 cars, which were defined for this series as single-seater cars using production based engines. Significant changes to the technical regulations were made for 1973. Engines from 2750cc to 5000cc capacity were now permitted, regardless of the number of cylinders. Engines with a capacity of between 4000cc and 5000cc were still required to use pushrod operated valve gear, however engines of less than 4000cc capacity could use unrestricted valve gear and could be turbocharged.

== Calendar ==
The championship was contested over fifteen rounds.

Round	Name	Circuit	Date	Winning driver	Car
1	Brands Hatch Rothmans F5000	(United Kingdom) Brands Hatch	17 March	(United Kingdom) Peter Gethin	Chevron B24 Chevrolet
2	Mallory Park Rothmans F5000	(United Kingdom) Mallory Park	1 April	(New Zealand) Graham McRae	McRae GM1 Chevrolet
3	GKN Vanwall Trophy	(United Kingdom) Silverstone	7 April	(United Kingdom) David Hobbs	Lola T330 Chevrolet
4	Snetterton Rothmans F5000	(United Kingdom) Snetterton	20 April	(United States) Brett Lunger	Trojan T101 Chevrolet
5	Brands Hatch Rothmans F5000	(United Kingdom) Brands Hatch	23 April	(United Kingdom) Steve Thompson	Chevron B24 Chevrolet
6	Oulton Park Rothmans F5000	(United Kingdom) Oulton Park	13 May	(Belgium) Teddy Pilette	Chevron B24 Chevrolet
7	Mallory Park Rothmans F5000	(United Kingdom) Mallory Park	28 May	(United Kingdom) Keith Holland	Trojan T101 Chevrolet
8		(Italy) Misano	10 June	Cancelled following practice	
9		(Netherlands) Zandvoort	1 July	Cancelled before practice	
10	Mallory Park Rothmans F5000	(United Kingdom) Mallory Park	8 July	(United States) Brett Lunger	Trojan T101 Chevrolet
11	Dublin Grand Prix	(Republic of Ireland) Mondello Park	22 July	(United Kingdom) Keith Holland	Trojan T101 Chevrolet
12		(United Kingdom) Silverstone	5 August	Cancelled following practice	
13	Brands Hatch Rothmans F5000	(United Kingdom) Brands Hatch	27 August	(Belgium) Teddy Pilette	Chevron B24 Chevrolet
14	Rothmans Gold Cup	(United Kingdom) Oulton Park	9 September	(United Kingdom) Peter Gethin	Chevron B24 Chevrolet
15	Jyllandsringen Rothmans F5000	(Denmark) Jyllands-Ringen	23 September	(United Kingdom) Ian Ashley	Lola T330 Chevrolet
16	Duinen Trophee	(Netherlands) Zandvoort	30 September	(United Kingdom) Guy Edwards	Lola T330 Chevrolet
17	Snetterton Rothmans F5000	(United Kingdom) Snetterton	7 October	(United Kingdom) Bob Evans	Trojan T101 Chevrolet
18	Brands Hatch Rothmans F5000	(United Kingdom) Brands Hatch	21 October	(United Kingdom) Guy Edwards	Lola T330 Chevrolet

== Points system ==
Championship points were awarded on a 20–15–12–10–8–6–4–3–2–1 basis for the first ten places at each of the first seventeen rounds and on a 40-30-24-20-16-12-8-6-4-2 basis for the first ten places at the final round.

== Championship standings ==
Position	Driver	Car	Entrant	Points
1	(Belgium) Teddy Pilette	McLaren M18 Chevrolet; Chevron B24 Chevrolet	Racing Team VDS	136
2	(United Kingdom) Tony Dean	Chevron B24 Chevrolet	Anglo-American Racing	133
3	(United Kingdom) Keith Holland	Trojan T101 Chevrolet; Lola T190 Chevrolet	Ian Ward Racing	116
4	(United Kingdom) Steve Thompson	Chevron B24 Chevrolet	Servis Appliances Racing	114
5	(United Kingdom) Guy Edwards	Lola T330 Chevrolet	John Butterworth	102
6	(Denmark) Tom Belsø	Lola T330 Chevrolet	ShellSPORT Luxembourg	97
7	(United States) Brett Lunger	Lola T330 Chevrolet; Trojan T101 Chevrolet	Hogan Racing Ltd; Sid Taylor	95
8	(United Kingdom) Peter Gethin	Chevron B24 Chevrolet	Chevron Racing; Anglo-American Racing	65
9	(United Kingdom) Bob Evans	Trojan T101 Chevrolet	Alan McKechnie Racing	64
10	(Netherlands) Gijs van Lennep	Lola T330 Chevrolet	ShellSPORT Luxembourg	59
11	(United Kingdom) Clive Santo	Surtees TS11 Chevrolet; Lola T330 Chevrolet	ShellSPORT Luxembourg	50
12	(United Kingdom) Ian Ashley	Lola T330 Chevrolet	Doug Hardwick	37
13	(United Kingdom) David Hobbs	Lola T330 Chevrolet	Hogan Racing Ltd	29
14	(New Zealand) Graham McRae	McRae GM1 Chevrolet; McRae GM2 Chevrolet	Iberia Team McRae	28
=	(New Zealand) David Oxton	Begg FM5 Chevrolet	GN Begg Engineering	28
16	(United Kingdom) John Watson	Trojan T101 Chevrolet	Hexagon Racing	24
17	(United Kingdom) Chris Craft	McLaren M18 Chevrolet; Chevron B24 Chevrolet	Racing Team VDS	23
=	(United States) Bob Brown	Chevron B24 Chevrolet	Anglo-American Racing	23
19	(Canada) Brian Robertson	McLaren M19 Chevrolet	Anglo-American Racing	15
20	(United Kingdom) Ray Allen	Surtees TS8 Chevrolet; Lola T330 Chevrolet	Servis Appliances Racing; ShellSPORT Luxembourg	12
21	(United Kingdom) Jock Russell	McRae GM1 Chevrolet	Jock Russell	7
22	(Denmark) Jac Nellemann	McLaren M18 Chevrolet	Sheridan Thynne	6
=	(United Kingdom) Alan Rollinson	McRae GM1 Chevrolet	Alan Rollinson	6
24	(United Kingdom) Tony Trimmer	McLaren M18 Chevrolet; Lola T330 Chevrolet	Sheridan Thynne; ShellSPORT Luxembourg	5
=	(United Kingdom) Willie Green	Trojan T101 Chevrolet	Hexagon Racing	5
26	(United Kingdom) Damien Magee	Trojan T101 Chevrolet	Hexagon Racing	4
27	(United Kingdom) Richard Knight	Kitchmac Chevrolet		3
28	(United States) John Gunn	March 73A Chevrolet		2
=	(United Kingdom) Clive Baker	McLaren M10B Chevrolet	Clive Baker	2
30	(Netherlands) Arie Luyendijk	McLaren M18 Chevrolet	Sheridan Thynne	1
=	(United Kingdom) Chris Featherstone	Lola T190 Chevrolet	Chris Featherstone	1
