= David Prophet =

British racing driver (1937–1981)

- Born: 9 October 1937; Hong Kong
- Died: 29 March 1981 (aged 43); Silverstone, Northamptonshire, England

Formula One World Championship career
- Nationality: (United Kingdom) British
- Active years: 1963, 1965
- Team: privateer Brabham
- Entries: 2
- Championships: 0
- Wins: 0
- Podiums: 0
- Career points: 0
- Pole positions: 0
- Fastest laps: 0
- First entry: 1963 South African Grand Prix
- Last entry: 1965 South African Grand Prix

David Prophet (9 October 1937 – 29 March 1981) was a British racing driver from England. He participated in two Formula One World Championship Grands Prix, debuting on 28 December 1963. He scored no championship points. He finished sixth in the non-Championship 1963 Rand Grand Prix.

Prophet was killed in a helicopter crash shortly after taking off from Silverstone Circuit on 29 March 1981. With him was Christopher Roberts.

== Racing record ==
=== Complete Formula One World Championship results ===
(key)

Year	Entrant	Chassis	Engine	1	2	3	4	5	6	7	8	9	10	WDC	Points
1963	David Prophet	Brabham BT6	Ford Straight-4	MON	BEL	NED	FRA	GBR	GER	ITA	USA	MEX	RSA; Ret	NC	0
1965	David Prophet Racing	Brabham BT10	Ford Straight-4	RSA; 14	MON	BEL	FRA	GBR	NED	GER	ITA	USA	MEX	NC	0

=== Non-Championship Formula One results ===
(key)

Year	Entrant	Chassis	Engine	1	2	3	4	5	6	7	8	9	10	11	12	13	14
1963	David Prophet	Brabham BT6	Ford Straight-4	LOM	GLV	PAU	IMO	SYR	AIN	INT	ROM	SOL	KAN; 11	MED	AUT	OUL	RAN; 6
1964	David Prophet Racing	Brabham BT10	Ford Straight-4	DMT	NWT	SYR	AIN	INT	SOL	MED	RAN; 18						
1965	David Prophet Racing	Lotus 24	Maserati Straight-4	ROC	SYR	SMT	INT	MED	RAN; Ret								
1966	David Prophet Racing	Lotus 24	Maserati Straight-4	RSA; Ret	SYR	INT	OUL										
1970	David Prophet Racing	McLaren M10B (F5000)	Chevrolet V8	ROC	INT; Ret	OUL; 7											
1971	David Prophet Racing	McLaren M10B (F5000)	Chevrolet V8	ARG; 11	ROC	QUE	SPR	INT; Ret	RIN	OUL; 7	VIC; 19						
1972	David Prophet Racing	McLaren M10B (F5000)	Chevrolet V8	ROC	BRA	INT; 14	OUL; NC	REP	VIC; DNS								

=== Complete British Saloon Car Championship results ===
(key) (Races in bold indicate pole position; races in italics indicate fastest lap.)

Year	Team	Car	Class	1	2	3	4	5	6	7	8	9	10	11	12	Pos.	Pts	Class
1970	Pierre de Plessis	Chevrolet Camaro Z28	D	BRH	SNE	THR	SIL	CRY	SIL; 3	SIL	CRO; 15	BRH; 6	OUL	BRH	BRH	28th	10	5th
