= 1973 Race of Champions =

- Non-championship race in the 1973 Formula One season

Race details
- Date: 18 March 1973
- Official name: VIII Race of Champions
- Location: Brands Hatch
- Course: Permanent racing facility
- Course length: 4.264 km (2.65 miles)
- Distance: 40 laps, 170.554 km (105.977 miles)

Pole position
Driver	(France) Jean-Pierre Beltoise	BRM
- Time: 1:21.1

Fastest lap
Drivers	(France) Jean-Pierre Beltoise	BRM
	(Austria) Niki Lauda	BRM
	(Sweden) Ronnie Peterson	Lotus-Cosworth
- Time: 1:23.0

Podium
First	(United Kingdom) Peter Gethin	Chevron-Chevrolet
Second	(New Zealand) Denny Hulme	McLaren-Cosworth
Third	(United Kingdom) James Hunt	Surtees-Cosworth

The 8th Race of Champions was a non-Championship motor race, run to Formula One rules, held on 18 March 1973 at Brands Hatch circuit in Kent, UK. The race included several entrants in Formula 5000 cars and was won by Peter Gethin in a Chevron-Chevrolet B24 '72-05'. This was the only race other than the poorly-attended 1969 Madrid Grand Prix in which a Formula 5000 car beat a Formula One car.

== Qualifying ==
Note: a blue background indicates a Formula 5000 entrant.

Pos.	No.	Driver	Constructor	Car	Lap	Gap
1	60	(France) Jean-Pierre Beltoise	BRM	BRM P160D	01:21.1	—
2	61	(Austria) Niki Lauda	BRM	BRM P160D	01:21.9	+0.8
3	59	(Australia) Vern Schuppan	BRM	BRM P160D	01:22.2	+1.1
4	58	(South Africa) Jody Scheckter	McLaren-Cosworth	McLaren M19C	01:22.6	+1.5
5	52	(United Kingdom) Mike Hailwood	Surtees-Cosworth	Surtees TS14A	01:22.7	+1.6
6	65	(Sweden) Ronnie Peterson	Lotus-Cosworth	Lotus 72E	01:22.7	+1.6
7	64	(Brazil) Emerson Fittipaldi	Lotus-Cosworth	Lotus 72D	01:23.1	+2.0
8	32	(United Kingdom) Peter Gethin	Chevron-Chevrolet	Chevron B24	01:23.9	+2.8
9	57	(New Zealand) Denis Hulme	McLaren-Cosworth	McLaren M23	01:24.0	+2.9
10	63	(New Zealand) Howden Ganley	Iso-Marlboro-Cosworth	Iso-Marlboro FX3B	01:24.2	+3.1
11	22	(United Kingdom) Keith Holland	Trojan-Chevrolet	Trojan T101	01:24.7	+3.6
12	19	(United States) Brett Lunger	Lola-Chevrolet	Lola T330	01:24.7	+3.6
13	56	(United Kingdom) James Hunt	Surtees-Cosworth	Surtees TS9B	01:24.8	+3.7
14	4	(United Kingdom) Guy Edwards	Lola-Chevrolet	Lola T330	01:25.2	+4.1
15	18	(United Kingdom) David Hobbs	Lola-Chevrolet	Lola T330	01:25.3	+4.2
16	22	(New Zealand) Graham McRae	McRae-Chevrolet	McRae GM1	01:25.6	+4.5
17	66	(United Kingdom) Graham Hill	Brabham-Cosworth	Brabham BT37	01:26.3	+5.2
18	26	(United Kingdom) John Watson	Brabham-Cosworth	Brabham BT42	01:26.5	+5.4
19	1	(Netherlands) Gijs van Lennep	Lola-Chevrolet	Lola T330	01:26.7	+5.6
20	8	(United Kingdom) Tony Dean	Chevron-Chevrolet	Chevron B24	01:26.8	+5.7
21	15	(United Kingdom) Steve Thompson	Chevron-Chevrolet	Chevron B24	01:27.1	+6.0
22	3	(United Kingdom) Clive Santo	Surtees-Chevrolet	Surtees TS11	01:27.7	+6.6
23	208	(Denmark) Tom Belsø	Lola-Chevrolet	Lola T330	01:27.7	+6.6
24	11	(United Kingdom) Bob Evans	Trojan-Chevrolet	Trojan T101	01:27.8	+6.7
25	33	(Belgium) Teddy Pilette	McLaren-Chevrolet	McLaren M18/M22	01:28.3	+7.2
26	67	(United Kingdom) Tony Trimmer	Iso-Marlboro-Cosworth	Iso-Marlboro FX3B	01:28.4	+7.3
27	5	(United Kingdom) Jock Russell	McRae-Chevrolet	McRae GM1	01:29.2	+8.1
28	6	(United Kingdom) Ian Ashley	Lola-Chevrolet	Lola T330	01:29.6	+8.5
29	38	(United States) John Gunn	March-Chevrolet	March 73A	01:30.5	+9.4
30	9	(United States) Bobby Brown	Chevron-Chevrolet	Chevron B24	01:31.7	+10.6
31	49	(United Kingdom) Clive Baker	McLaren-Chevrolet	McLaren M10B	01:32.3	+11.2
32	14	(United Kingdom) Ray Allen	Surtees-Chevrolet	Surtees TS8	01:36.4	+15.3

== Classification ==
Note: a blue background indicates a Formula 5000 entrant.

Pos.	No.	Driver	Entrant	Constructor	Laps	Time/Retired	Grid
1	32	(United Kingdom) Peter Gethin	Chevron Racing	Chevron-Chevrolet	40	57:22.9	8
2	57	(New Zealand) Denny Hulme	Yardley Team McLaren	McLaren-Cosworth	40	+3.4	9
3	56	(United Kingdom) James Hunt	Lord Hesketh	Surtees-Cosworth	40	+3.4	13
4	67	(United Kingdom) Tony Trimmer	Frank Williams Racing Cars	Iso-Marlboro-Cosworth	40	+ 26.5	25
5	8	(United Kingdom) Tony Dean	Anglo-American Racing Team	Chevron-Chevrolet	39	+ 1 lap	20
6	60	(France) Jean-Pierre Beltoise	Marlboro BRM	BRM	39	+ 1 lap	1
7	208	(Denmark) Tom Belsø	ShellSPORT Luxembourg	Lola-Chevrolet	39	+ 1 lap	23
8	14	(United Kingdom) Ray Allen	Servis Domestic Appliances	Surtees-Chevrolet	38	+ 2 laps	29
9	3	(United Kingdom) Clive Santo	ShellSport Luxembourg	Surtees-Chevrolet	38	+ 2 laps	22
10	6	(United Kingdom) Ian Ashley	Henley Forklift Co	Lola-Chevrolet	38	+ 2 laps	27
11	9	(United States) Bobby Brown	Anglo-American Racing Team	Chevron-Chevrolet	38	+ 2 laps	28
12	1	(Netherlands) Gijs van Lennep	ShellSPORT Luxembourg	Lola-Chevrolet	37	+ 3 laps	19
13	5	(United Kingdom) Jock Russell	Jock Russell	McRae-Chevrolet	36	+ 4 laps	26
Ret	52	(United Kingdom) Mike Hailwood	Team Surtees	Surtees-Cosworth	35	Accident	5
Ret	22	(New Zealand) Graham McRae	Team McRae	McRae-Chevrolet	33	Overheating	16
Ret	61	(Austria) Niki Lauda	Marlboro BRM	BRM	29	Electrical	2
Ret	19	(United States) Brett Lunger	Hogan Racing	Lola-Chevrolet	29	Engine	12
Ret	59	(Australia) Vern Schuppan	Marlboro BRM	BRM	26	Accident	3
Ret	58	(South Africa) Jody Scheckter	Yardley Team McLaren	McLaren-Cosworth	26	Accident	4
Ret	25	(United Kingdom) Keith Holland	Ian Ward Racing	Trojan-Chevrolet	22	Rear Wing	11
Ret	65	(Sweden) Ronnie Peterson	Team Lotus	Lotus-Cosworth	18	Gearbox	6
Ret	4	(United Kingdom) Guy Edwards	John Butterworth	Lola-Chevrolet	18	Engine	14
Ret	63	(New Zealand) Howden Ganley	Frank Williams Racing	Iso-Marlboro-Cosworth	13	Handling	10
Ret	18	(United Kingdom) David Hobbs	Hogan Racing	Lola-Chevrolet	12	Handling	15
Ret	15	(United Kingdom) Steve Thompson	Servis Domestic Appliances	Chevron-Chevrolet	8	Radiator	21
Ret	62	(United Kingdom) John Watson	Motor Racing Developments	Brabham-Cosworth	7	Accident	18
Ret	64	(Brazil) Emerson Fittipaldi	Team Lotus	Lotus-Cosworth	2	Engine	7
Ret	66	(United Kingdom) Graham Hill	Embassy Racing	Brabham-Cosworth	0	Accident	17
Ret	33	(Belgium) Teddy Pilette	Racing Team V.D.S.	McLaren-Chevrolet	0	Accident	24
DNS	11	(United Kingdom) Bob Evans	McKechnie Racing Organisation	Trojan-Chevrolet			
DNS	38	(United States) John Gunn	John Gunn	March-Chevrolet			
DNS	49	(United Kingdom) Clive Baker	Clive Baker	McLaren-Chevrolet			

Previous race: 1972 World Championship Victory Race	Formula One non-championship races 1973 season	Next race: 1973 BRDC International Trophy
Previous race: 1972 Race of Champions	Race of Champions	Next race: 1974 Race of Champions
