= 1971 BRDC International Trophy =

- combined Formula One/Formula 5000 race
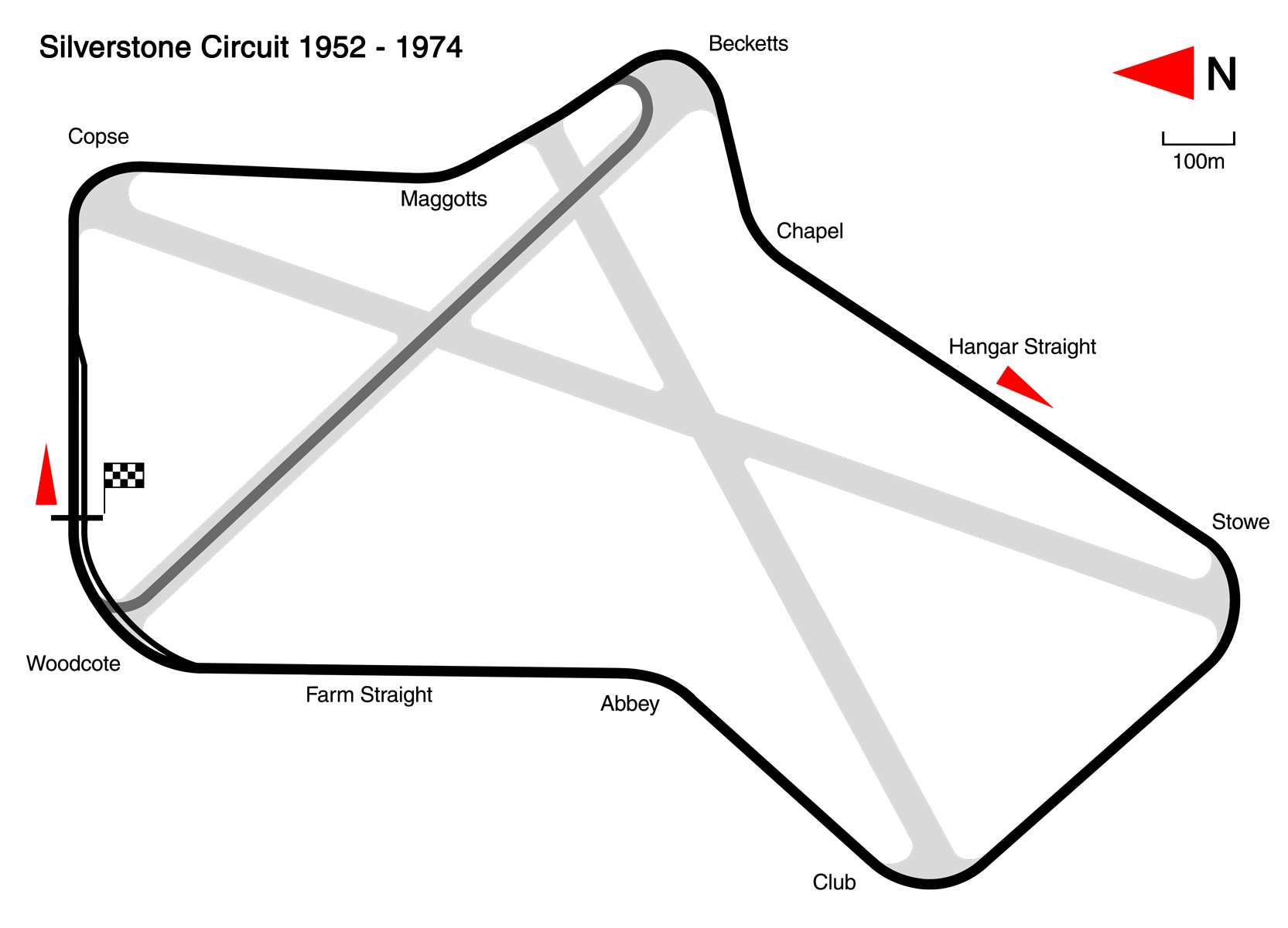

Race details
- Date: 8 May 1971
- Official name: XXIII GEN/Daily Express BRDC International Trophy
- Location: Silverstone Circuit, Northamptonshire
- Course: Permanent racing facility
- Course length: 4.714 km (2.923 miles)
- Distance: 2 x 26 laps, 244.80 km (152.11 miles)

Pole position
Driver	(New Zealand) Chris Amon	Matra
- Time: 1:20.0

Fastest lap
Driver	(United Kingdom) Jackie Stewart	Tyrrell-Cosworth
- Time: 1:20.5 (1st heat)

Podium
First	(United Kingdom) Graham Hill	Brabham-Cosworth
Second	(United Kingdom) Peter Gethin	McLaren-Cosworth
Third	(Australia) Tim Schenken	Brabham-Cosworth

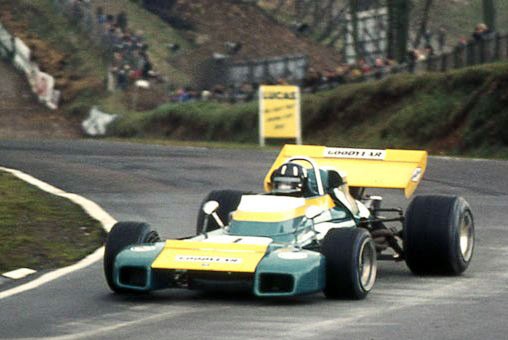
Graham Hill in the Brabham BT34 "lobster-claw" car which took him to victory in the 1971 International Trophy

The 23rd BRDC International Trophy meeting - formally the GEN/Daily Express BRDC International Trophy - was held on 8 May 1971 at the Silverstone Circuit, England. The race was run to Formula One and Formula 5000 regulations, and was held over two heats of 26 laps each, the final results being an aggregate of the two. Graham Hill emerged the winner in the unique Brabham BT34 lobster-claw car, designed by Ron Tauranac. It would be the two-time World Champion's last victory in a Formula One race. The 1971 event was also notable as one of the few competitive outings for the Lotus 56 gas turbine car. However, suspension failure on only the third lap of the first heat resulted in early retirement for driver Emerson Fittipaldi, although the car held together for long enough to take third place in the second heat.

The race incorporated Round 5 of the 1971 Rothmans European Formula 5000 Championship.

== Results ==
=== Final aggregate ===
Note: a blue background indicates a Formula 5000 entrant.

Pos.	Driver	Chassis	Engine	Time
1	(United Kingdom) Graham Hill	Brabham BT34	Cosworth	1:11:03.2
2	(United Kingdom) Peter Gethin	McLaren M14A	Cosworth	+ 1:33.8
3	(Australia) Tim Schenken	Brabham BT33	Cosworth	+ 2:04.7
4	(Mexico) Pedro Rodríguez	BRM P160	BRM	+ 1 lap
5	(United Kingdom) Mike Hailwood	Surtees TS8	Chevrolet	+ 1 lap
6	(France) Henri Pescarolo	March 711	Cosworth	+ 1 lap
7	(United Kingdom) Tony Dean	McLaren M7A	Chevrolet	+ 2 laps
8	(France) Jean-Pierre Jaussaud	McLaren M18	Chevrolet	+ 2 laps
9	(Australia) Frank Gardner	Lola T192	Chevrolet	+ 2 laps
10	(United Kingdom) Mike Beuttler	March 701	Cosworth	+ 2 laps
11	(United Kingdom) John Surtees	Surtees TS9	Cosworth	+ 3 laps
12	(New Zealand) Chris Amon	Matra MS120B	Matra	+ 3 laps
13	(Sweden) Reine Wisell	Lotus 72C	Cosworth	+ 4 laps
14	(United Kingdom) Alan Rollinson	Surtees TS7	Cosworth	+ 4 laps
15	(Sweden) Ulf Norinder	McLaren M18	Chevrolet	+ 5 laps
16	(United Kingdom) Gordon Spice	McLaren M10B	Chevrolet	+ 5 laps
17	(United Kingdom) Fred Saunders	Crosslé 15F	Rover	+ 6 laps
18	(United Kingdom) Bob Miller	Dulon LD8	Chevrolet	+ 8 laps
19	(United Kingdom) Jock Russell	Lotus 70	Ford	+ 14 laps
20	(United Kingdom) Brian Redman	McLaren M18	Chevrolet	+ 17 laps
21	(France) Jean-Pierre Beltoise	Matra MS120B	Matra	+ 19 laps
22	(Brazil) Emerson Fittipaldi	Lotus 56B	P&W	+ 24 laps
23	(United Kingdom) Jackie Stewart	Tyrrell 003	Ford	+ 26 laps
24	(New Zealand) Howden Ganley	BRM P153	BRM	+ 26 laps
25	(Sweden) Ronnie Peterson	March 711	Alfa Romeo	+ 28 laps
26	(United Kingdom) David Prophet	McLaren M10B	Chevrolet	+ 32 laps
27	(United Kingdom) John Myerscough	McLaren M10B	Chevrolet	+ 35 laps
28	(United Kingdom) Robert Lamplough	Lola T102	Ford	+ 42 laps
29	(Switzerland) Jo Siffert	BRM P160	BRM	+ 45 laps
30	(United Kingdom) Ray Allen	McLaren M10B	Chevrolet	+ 47 laps
31	(United Kingdom) Trevor Taylor	Leda LT25	Chevrolet	+ 49 laps

=== Heats ===
Heat 1

Pos.	Driver	Constructor	Time/Ret.
1	(United Kingdom) Jackie Stewart	Tyrrell-Cosworth	35:29.0
2	(Mexico) Pedro Rodríguez	BRM	+ 11.6 s
3	(United Kingdom) Graham Hill	Brabham-Cosworth	+ 12.8 s
4	(United Kingdom) John Surtees	Surtees-Cosworth	+ 18.9 s
5	(France) Jean-Pierre Beltoise	Matra	+ 22.8 s
6	(United Kingdom) Peter Gethin	McLaren-Cosworth	+ 1:06.5
7	(Sweden) Reine Wisell	Lotus-Cosworth	+ 1:16.5
8	(New Zealand) Howden Ganley	BRM	+ 1:19.9
9	(Australia) Tim Schenken	Brabham-Cosworth	+ 1:20.6
10	(United Kingdom) Brian Redman	McLaren-Chevrolet	+ 1:21.0
11	(United Kingdom) Tony Dean	McLaren-Chevrolet	+ 1 lap
12	(United Kingdom) Mike Hailwood	Surtees-Chevrolet	+ 1 lap
13	(United Kingdom) Alan Rollinson	Surtees-Cosworth	+ 1 lap
14	(Australia) Frank Gardner	Lola-Chevrolet	+ 1 lap
15	(France) Henri Pescarolo	March-Cosworth	+ 1 lap
16	(France) Jean-Pierre Jaussaud	McLaren-Chevrolet	+ 1 lap
17	(United Kingdom) Mike Beuttler	March-Cosworth	+ 1 lap
18	(Sweden) Ronnie Peterson	March-Alfa Romeo	accident
19	(United Kingdom) Gordon Spice	McLaren-Chevrolet	gearbox
20	(Sweden) Ulf Norinder	McLaren-Chevrolet	+ 3 laps
21	(New Zealand) Chris Amon	Matra	fuel
22	(United Kingdom) Jock Russell	Lotus-Ford	+ 4 laps
23	(United Kingdom) Fred Saunders	Crosslé-Rover	+ 4 laps
24	(United Kingdom) Bob Miller	Dulon-Chevrolet	+ 4 laps
Ret	(United Kingdom) David Prophet	McLaren-Chevrolet	cooling
Ret	(United Kingdom) John Myerscough	McLaren-Chevrolet	oil leak
Ret	(Switzerland) Jo Siffert	BRM	engine
Ret	(United Kingdom) Ray Allen	McLaren-Chevrolet	accident
Ret	(United Kingdom) Trevor Taylor	Leda-Chevrolet	handling
Ret	(United Kingdom) Robert Lamplough	Lola-Ford	oil leak
Ret	(Brazil) Emerson Fittipaldi	Lotus-P&W	suspension

- Pole position: Chris Amon - 1:20.0
- Fastest lap: Jackie Stewart - 1:20.5
Heat 2

Pos.	Driver	Constructor	Time/Ret.
1	(United Kingdom) Graham Hill	Brabham-Cosworth	35:21.4
2	(New Zealand) Chris Amon	Matra	+ 5.2 s
3	(Brazil) Emerson Fittipaldi	Lotus-P&W	+ 38.0 s
4	(United Kingdom) Peter Gethin	McLaren-Cosworth	+ 40.1 s
5	(France) Henri Pescarolo	March-Cosworth	+ 48.2 s
6	(United Kingdom) Mike Hailwood	Surtees-Chevrolet	+ 56.1 s
7	(Australia) Tim Schenken	Brabham-Cosworth	+ 56.9 s
8	(Mexico) Pedro Rodríguez	BRM	+ 1 lap
9	(United Kingdom) Tony Dean	McLaren-Chevrolet	+ 1 lap
10	(France) Jean-Pierre Jaussaud	McLaren-Chevrolet	+ 1 lap
11	(Australia) Frank Gardner	Lola-Chevrolet	+ 1 lap
12	(United Kingdom) Mike Beuttler	March-Cosworth	+ 1 lap
13	(United Kingdom) Alan Rollinson	Surtees-Cosworth	+ 1 lap
14	(Sweden) Ulf Norinder	McLaren-Chevrolet	+ 2 laps
15	(United Kingdom) John Surtees	Surtees-Cosworth	suspension
16	(United Kingdom) Fred Saunders	Crosslé-Rover	out of fuel
17	(United Kingdom) Gordon Spice	McLaren-Chevrolet	+ 3 laps
18	(Sweden) Reine Wisell	Lotus-Cosworth	engine
19	(United Kingdom) Bob Miller	Dulon-Chevrolet	+ 4 laps
Ret	(United Kingdom) Jock Russell	Lotus-Ford	oil pump
Ret	(United Kingdom) Brian Redman	McLaren-Chevrolet	electrics
Ret	(United Kingdom) Robert Lamplough	Lola-Ford	water pump
Ret	(France) Jean-Pierre Beltoise	Matra	engine
Ret	(New Zealand) Howden Ganley	BRM	accident
Ret	(United Kingdom) Jackie Stewart	Tyrrell-Cosworth	accident

- Pole position: Jackie Stewart
- Fastest lap: John Surtees - 1:20.6

Previous race: 1971 Spring Trophy	Formula One non-championship races 1971 season	Next race: 1971 Jochen Rindt Gedächtnisrennen
Previous race: 1970 BRDC International Trophy	BRDC International Trophy	Next race: 1972 BRDC International Trophy
