= 1972 Race of Champions =

- Non-championship race in the 1972 Formula One season

Race details
- Date: March 19, 1972
- Official name: VII Race of Champions
- Location: Brands Hatch Grand Prix Circuit, Fawkham, Kent, England
- Course: Permanent racing facility
- Course length: 4.206 km (2.6136 miles)
- Distance: 40 laps, 168.24 km (104.544 miles)

Pole position
Driver	(Brazil) Emerson Fittipaldi	Lotus-Cosworth
- Time: 1:23.9

Fastest lap
Driver	(Brazil) Emerson Fittipaldi	Lotus-Cosworth
- Time: 1:23.8

Podium
First	(Brazil) Emerson Fittipaldi	Lotus-Cosworth
Second	(United Kingdom) Mike Hailwood	Surtees-Cosworth
Third	(New Zealand) Denny Hulme	McLaren-Cosworth

The 1972 Race of Champions was a non-championship Formula One race held at Brands Hatch on 19 March 1972. The race was also open to Formula 5000 cars. F1 driver Emerson Fittipaldi qualified on pole, set fastest lap and won. Alan Rollinson was the best-placed F5000 finisher, and tenth overall.

== Qualifying ==
Pos.	Driver	Constructor	Car	Lap	Gap
1	(Brazil) Emerson Fittipaldi	Lotus-Cosworth	Lotus 72	01:23.9	
2	(United Kingdom) Peter Gethin	BRM	BRM P160	01:24.1	+0.2
3	(United Kingdom) Mike Hailwood	Surtees-Cosworth	Surtees TS9	01:24.1	+0.2
4	(New Zealand) Denny Hulme	McLaren-Cosworth	McLaren M19A	01:24.3	+0.4
5	(United States) Peter Revson	McLaren-Cosworth	McLaren M19A	01:24.3	+0.4
6	(New Zealand) Howden Ganley	BRM	BRM P160	01:24.8	+0.9
7	(Australia) Tim Schenken	Surtees-Cosworth	Surtees TS9	01:24.8	+0.9
8	(Sweden) Ronnie Peterson	March-Cosworth	March 721	01:25.6	+1.7
9	(France) Jean-Pierre Beltoise	BRM	BRM P160	01:25.8	+1.9
10	(United Kingdom) Dave Walker	Lotus-Cosworth	Lotus 72	01:25.8	+1.9
11	(United Kingdom) Mike Beuttler	March-Cosworth	March 721	01:26.0	+2.1
12	(West Germany) Rolf Stommelen	Eifelland-Cosworth	Eifelland Type 21	01:26.2	+2.3
13	(New Zealand) Graham McRae	Leda-Chevrolet	Leda LT27	01:26.3	+2.4
14	(Netherlands) Gijs van Lennep	Surtees-Chevrolet	Surtees TS11	01:26.9	+3.0
15	(United Kingdom) Brian Redman	McLaren-Chevrolet	McLaren M10B	01:27.2	+3.3
16	(United Kingdom) Alan Rollinson	Lola-Chevrolet	Lola T300	01:27.4	+3.5
17	(United Kingdom) Keith Holland	McLaren-Chevrolet	McLaren M10B	01:28.6	+4.7
18	(United Kingdom) Ray Allen	McLaren-Chevrolet	McLaren M18	01:29.9	+6.0
19	(Belgium) Teddy Pilette	McLaren-Chevrolet	McLaren M22	01:29.9	+6.0

== Classification ==
Pos.	Driver	Constructor	Time/Laps
1	(Brazil) Emerson Fittipaldi	Lotus-Cosworth	56:40.6
2	(United Kingdom) Mike Hailwood	Surtees-Cosworth	+3.4
3	(New Zealand) Denny Hulme	McLaren-Cosworth	+25.1
4	(United Kingdom) Peter Gethin	BRM	+25.7
5	(Australia) Tim Schenken	Surtees-Cosworth	+26.4
6	(France) Jean-Pierre Beltoise	BRM	+26.8
7	(New Zealand) Howden Ganley	BRM	+34.1
8	(United States) Peter Revson	McLaren-Cosworth	+53.2
9	(Australia) Dave Walker	Lotus-Cosworth	+1:24.2
10	(United Kingdom) Alan Rollinson	Lola-Chevrolet	39 laps
11	(West Germany) Rolf Stommelen	Eifelland-Cosworth	39 laps
12	(Sweden) Ronnie Peterson	March-Cosworth	39 laps
13	(Belgium) Teddy Pilette	McLaren-Chevrolet	38 laps
14	(United Kingdom) Ray Allen	McLaren-Chevrolet	37 laps
Ret	(United Kingdom) Brian Redman	McLaren-Chevrolet	35 laps, spin/stalled
Ret	(Netherlands) Gijs van Lennep	Surtees-Chevrolet	18 laps; suspension
Ret	(United Kingdom) Mike Beuttler	March-Cosworth	3 laps; fuel pump
DNS	(New Zealand) Graham McRae	Leda-Chevrolet	withdrawn^{1}; protest
DNS	(United Kingdom) Keith Holland	McLaren-Chevrolet	withdrawn; engine

^{1}McRae withdrew in protest after having had his win in the F5000 Championship race overturned.

Previous race: 1971 International Gold Cup	Formula One non-championship races 1972 season	Next race: 1972 Brazilian Grand Prix
Previous race: 1971 Race of Champions	Race of Champions	Next race: 1973 Race of Champions
