= 1971 International Gold Cup =

- Non-championship race in the 1971 Formula One season

Race details
- Date: 22 August 1971
- Official name: XVIII International Gold Cup
- Location: Oulton Park, Cheshire, United Kingdom
- Course: Permanent racing facility
- Course length: 4.441 km (2.760 miles)
- Distance: 40 laps, 177.634 km (110.40 miles)

Pole position
Driver	(United Kingdom) Peter Gethin	BRM
- Time: 1:24.6

Fastest lap
Driver	(United Kingdom) John Surtees	Surtees-Cosworth
- Time: 1:24.8

Podium
First	(United Kingdom) John Surtees	Surtees-Cosworth
Second	(New Zealand) Howden Ganley	BRM
Third	(Australia) Frank Gardner	Lola-Chevrolet

The XVIII International Gold Cup was a non-championship Formula One race, and also a round of the European Formula 5000 Championship, held on 22 August 1971 at Oulton Park.

Eight Formula 1 cars turned up, with a full complement of F5000 cars making up the rest of the grid. Peter Gethin set pole position for the first heat, which was won by Henri Pescarolo. The grid for the second heat was arranged according to the finishing order of the first heat. John Surtees took the lead from Pescarolo and held it to the end, setting fastest lap, and a new circuit record, in the process. His win and his third place in the first heat made him the aggregate winner, just ahead of Howden Ganley.

Frank Gardner was the highest F5000 finisher in both heats, his performance being good enough for third overall.

== Qualifying ==
Pos.	No.	Driver	Entrant	Car	Lap	Gap
1	34	(United Kingdom) Peter Gethin	Yardley Team BRM	BRM P160	1:24.6	
2	37	(France) Henri Pescarolo	Motul/Frank Williams Racing Cars	March 711	1:25.0	+0.4
3	33	(New Zealand) Howden Ganley	Yardley Team BRM	BRM P153	1:25.0	+0.0
4	32	(United Kingdom) John Surtees	Brooke Bond Oxo/Rob Walker/Team Surtees	Surtees TS9	1:25.8	+0.8
5	35	(United Kingdom) Mike Beuttler	Clarke-Mordaunt-Guthrie Racing	March 711	1:25.8	+0.0
6	3	(Australia) Frank Gardner	Motor Racing Research/Lola Cars Ltd.	Lola T300	1:26.0	+0.2
7	26	(United Kingdom) Alan Rollinson	Alan McKechnie Racing	Surtees TS8	1:26.8	+0.8
8	1	(United Kingdom) Brian Redman	Sid Tayor/Castrol Racing	McLaren M18	1:28.2	+1.4
9	22	(New Zealand) Graham McRae	Crown Lynn Properties	McLaren M10B	1:28.8	+0.6
10	15	(United Kingdom) Mike Hailwood	Team Surtees Ltd.	Surtees TS8	1:28.8	+0.0
11	11	(United Kingdom) Trevor Taylor	Malaya Garages	Leda LT25	1:29.0	+0.2
12	39	(United Kingdom) Chris Craft	Alain de Cadenet	Brabham BT33	1:29.2	+0.2
13	77	(United Kingdom) Mike Walker	Doug Hardwick	Lola T192	1:29.8	+0.6
14	38	(United Kingdom) Tony Trimmer	Motul/Frank Williams Racing Cars	March 701	1:31.0	+1.2
15	21	(United Kingdom) David Prophet	Bugle-Prophet Racing	McLaren M10B	1:31.8	+0.8
16	44	(United Kingdom) Gordon Spice	Gordon Spice Cash'n'Carry	McLaren M10B	1:32.4	+0.6
17	66	(Republic of Ireland) Fred Saunders	Fred Saunders/London School of Flying	Crosslé 15F	1:34.4	+2.0
18	41	(United Kingdom) Bob Miller	Bob Miller	Dulon LD8	1:37.8	+3.4
19	5	(United Kingdom) Jock Russell	Jock Russell	Lotus 70	1:39.6	+1.8
20	4	(United Kingdom) John Myerscough	John Butterworth Racing	McLaren M10B	1:39.8	+0.2
21	8	(United Kingdom) Ray Allen	Pink Stamps/Epstein Team Trojan	McLaren M10B	1:41.0	+1.2
22	36	(France) Jean-Pierre Jarier	Shell Arnold Team	March 701	2:14.0	+33.0
DNQ	29	(United Kingdom) "Ippocastano"	Peter J Hawtin	Cooper T90	broken halfshaft	
DSQ	16	(Germany) Roland Heller	Rallye und Race Gemeinschaft	Lola T190	failed scrutineering	

== Classification ==
Pos.	No.	Driver	Constructor	Heat 1	Heat 2	Aggregate	Grid
1	32	(United Kingdom) John Surtees	Surtees-Cosworth	0:28:54.0	0:28:44.6	0:57:39.0	4
2	33	(New Zealand) Howden Ganley	BRM	0:28:52.6	0:28:57.4	0:57:50.0	3
3	3	(Australia) Frank Gardner	Lola-Chevrolet	0:29:19.6	0:29:27.0	0:58:46.6	6
4	26	(United Kingdom) Alan Rollinson	Surtees-Chevrolet	0:29:42.2	0:29:33.0	0:59:15.2	7
5	39	(United Kingdom) Chris Craft	Brabham-Cosworth	0:29:57.0	0:29:33.8	0:59:30.8	12
6	77	(United Kingdom) Mike Walker	Lola-Chevrolet	0:30:16.2	0:30:2.0	1:00:18.2	13
7	21	(United Kingdom) David Prophet	McLaren-Chevrolet	+1 lap	+1 lap	38 laps	15
8	66	(Republic of Ireland) Fred Saunders	Crosslé-Rover	+2 laps	+2 laps	36 laps	17
9	22	(New Zealand) Graham McRae	McLaren-Chevrolet	15 laps/fire	0:29:41.0	35 laps	9
10	36	(France) Jean-Pierre Jarier	March-Cosworth	+4 laps	+2 laps	34 laps	22
11	15	(United Kingdom) Mike Hailwood	Surtees-Chevrolet	0:29:27.8	13 laps/accident	33 laps	10
12	41	(United Kingdom) Bob Miller	Dulon-Chevrolet	+3 laps	16 laps/spin	33 laps	18
13	37	(France) Henri Pescarolo	March-Cosworth	0:28:48.2	6 laps/accident	26 laps	2
14	34	(United Kingdom) Peter Gethin	BRM	0:29:19.8	3 laps/accident	23 laps	1
15	44	(United Kingdom) Gordon Spice	McLaren-Chevrolet	0 laps/accident	+1 lap	19 laps	16
16	38	(United Kingdom) Tony Trimmer	March-Cosworth	17 laps/accident	DNS	17 laps	14
17	1	(United Kingdom) Brian Redman	McLaren-Chevrolet	14 laps/overheating	DNS	14 laps	8
18	11	(United Kingdom) Trevor Taylor	Leda LT25-Chevrolet	4 laps/accident	DNS	4 laps	11
19	8	(United Kingdom) Ray Allen	McLaren-Chevrolet	1 laps/oil pump	DNS	1 lap	21
20	35	(United Kingdom) Mike Beuttler	March-Cosworth	0 laps/fuel injection	DNS	0 laps	5
21	5	(United Kingdom) Jock Russell	Lotus-Ford	0 laps/camshaft	DNS	0 laps	19
NC	4	(United Kingdom) John Myerscough	McLaren-Chevrolet	DNS/practice accident	DNS		20

Previous race: 1971 Jochen Rindt Gedächtnisrennen	Formula One non-championship races 1971 season	Next race: 1971 World Championship Victory Race
Previous race: 1970 International Gold Cup	International Gold Cup	Next race: 1972 International Gold Cup
