= Nivelles-Baulers =

Belgian race track

(Belgium) Nivelles-Baulers
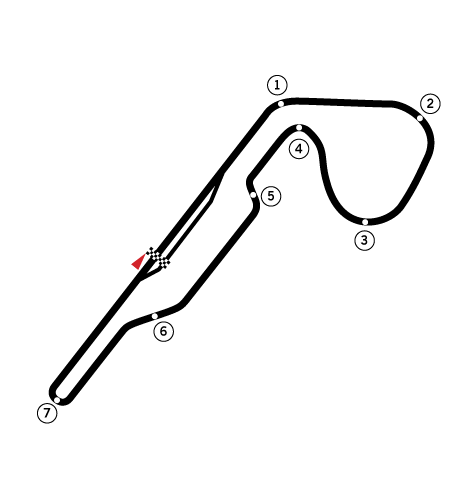
- Grand Prix Circuit (1972–1981)
- Location: Nivelles, Belgium
- Coordinates: 50°37′16″N 4°19′37″E
- Broke ground: 1971
- Opened: 1972
- Closed: June 30, 1981; 44 years ago
- Architect: John Hugenholtz
- Major events: Formula One; Belgian Grand Prix (1972, 1974); Formula 750 (1976, 1978); Formula Two (1973); Formula 5000 (1972)

Grand Prix Circuit (1972–1981)
- Surface: Tarmac
- Length: 3.724 km (2.314 mi)
- Turns: 7
- Race lap record: 1:11.310 ( (New Zealand) Denny Hulme, McLaren M23, 1974, F1)

Nivelles-Baulers was a 2.314 mi (3.724 km) race track in Nivelles (in French)/Nijvel (in Dutch) near Brussels, Belgium.

== History ==
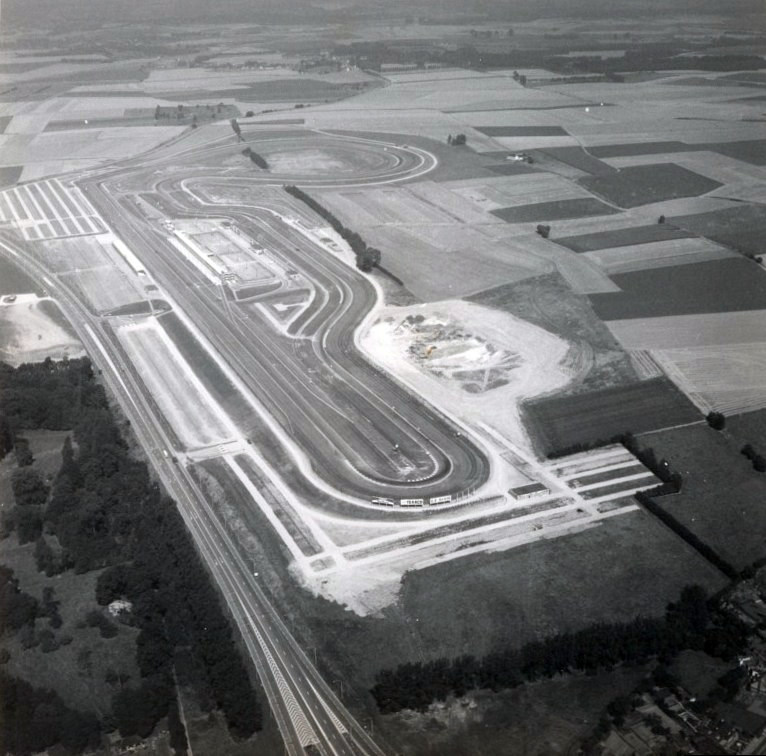
Aerial view of the Nivelles-Baulers circuit

Built in 1971, the circuit hosted two rounds of the Formula One Belgian Grand Prix in 1972 and 1974 both won by Emerson Fittipaldi, during the time when the race was supposed to alternate between Walloon and Flemish circuits. Designed by Roger Caignie and John Hugenholtz to be a safe alternative to Spa, Nivelles was perhaps too safe. It had massive runoff areas, was flat and featureless, and was described by many drivers as being bland and sterile. Nivelles was not popular amongst the paying spectators since they thought that they were not close enough to the action.

The track ran into economic problems very early in its life. The organiser went bankrupt in 1974. They were however able to find enough sponsors to organise that year's Formula One race. In 1976 it was once again Nivelles's turn to organise the Belgian Grand Prix, but the track was not considered safe enough for Formula One because of the condition of the tarmac. By 1980 the circuit was deemed too dangerous for car racing, but motorcycle events continued until 1981. When the circuit licence expired on June 30, 1981, the track was finally closed for good. Until the late 1990s the pit buildings and the circuit were left abandoned, and it was possible to drive illegal laps around the track. However, in the early 21st century the track was demolished and is now a part of an industrial estate, but it is still possible to see traces of the circuit.

The fastest F1 lap at the circuit during a race was set in 1974 by Denny Hulme, who set a time of 1:11.31 in his McLaren-Ford.

== Lap records ==
The fastest official race lap records at the Nivelles-Baulers are listed as:

Category	Time	Driver	Vehicle	Event
Grand Prix Circuit (1972–1981): 3.724 km (2.314 mi)
Formula One	1:11.310	Denny Hulme	McLaren M23	1974 Belgian Grand Prix
Formula Two	1:14.170	Jochen Mass	Surtees TS15	1973 Nivelles F2 round
Formula 5000	1:17.000	Graham McRae	McRae GM1	1972 Nivelles F5000 round
Group 4	1:28.600	Clemens Schickentanz	Porsche Carrera RSR	1973 Nivelles Euro GT round
