= 1971 World Championship Victory Race =

- Non-championship race in the 1971 Formula One season

Race details
- Date: 24 October 1971
- Official name: Rothmans World Championship Victory Race
- Location: Brands Hatch, Kent
- Course: Permanent racing facility
- Course length: 4.265 km (2.65 miles)
- Distance: 40 laps, 170.59 km (106 miles)

Pole position
Driver	(Switzerland) Jo Siffert	BRM
- Time: 1:22.8

Fastest lap
Driver	(Brazil) Emerson Fittipaldi	Lotus
- Time: 1:24.0

Podium
First	(United Kingdom) Peter Gethin	BRM
Second	(Brazil) Emerson Fittipaldi	Lotus
Third	(United Kingdom) Jackie Stewart	Tyrrell

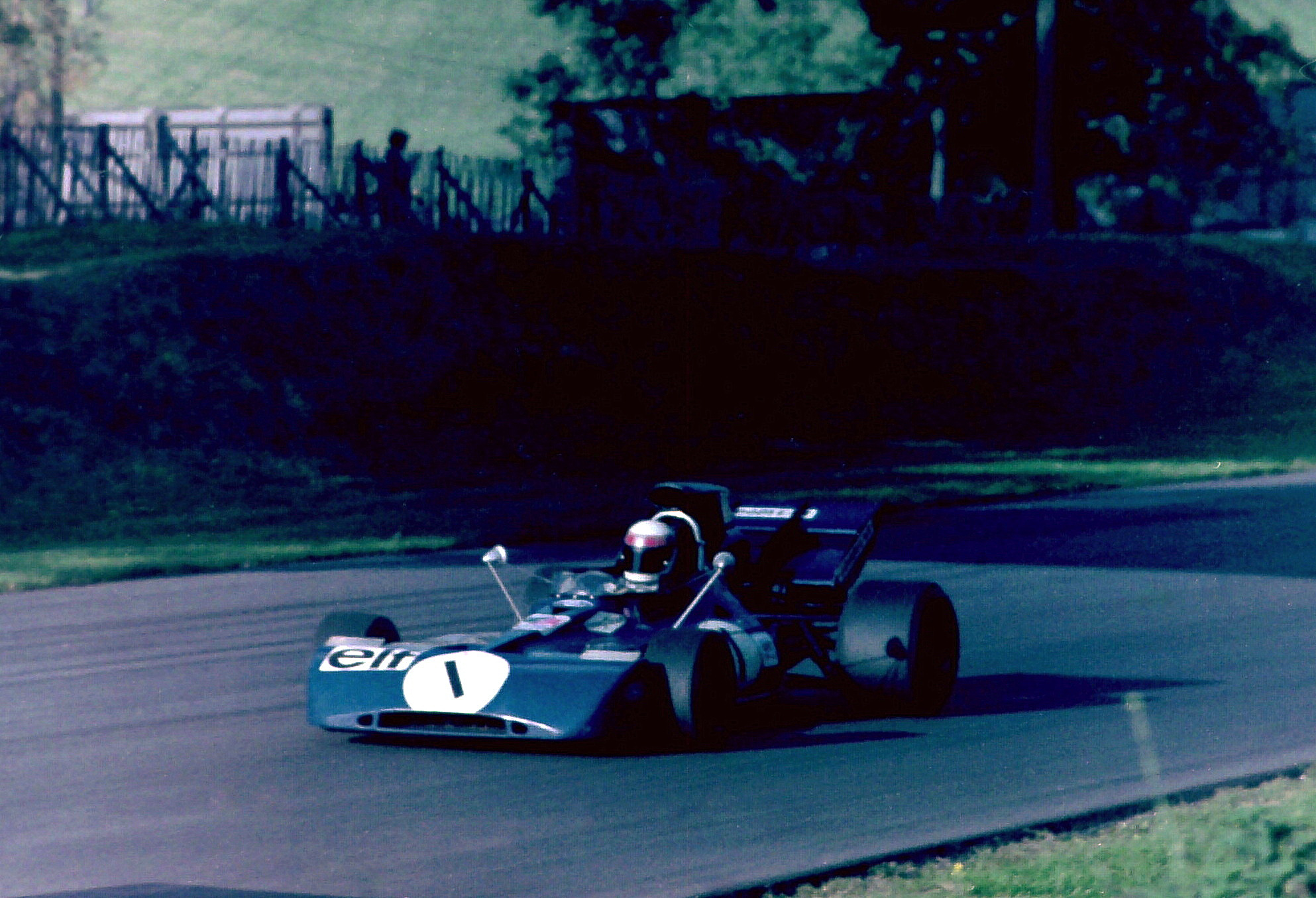
Jackie Stewart driving the Tyrrell 003 on his way to third place

The Rothmans World Championship Victory Race was a motor race, run to Formula One rules, held on 24 October 1971 at Brands Hatch, Kent. The race was to be run over 40 laps of the circuit, but race was red-flagged and abandoned on lap 15 following the fatal accident suffered by Swiss driver Jo Siffert. The result was taken from the race order after 14 laps, with Peter Gethin being declared the winner in his BRM P160. The entry included several Formula 5000 cars which were contesting Round 12 of the 1971 Rothmans European Formula 5000 Championship.

Siffert's accident led to a rapid overhaul of safety, both in-car and on circuit. In the subsequent Royal Automobile Club (the UK organising and regulatory representative of the FIA at the time) investigation, it was discovered that the crash itself caused non-fatal injuries but Siffert had rather been killed by smoke inhalation. None of the trackside fire extinguishers worked, and it was found to be impossible to reach the car and extract Siffert because of the intense fire. On-board fire extinguishers (using BCF—Bromochlorodifluoromethane, an aircraft product) became mandatory and also piped air directly into the drivers' helmets.

== Qualifying ==
Note: a blue background indicates a Formula 5000 entrant.

Pos	No.	Driver	Constructor	Lap	Gap
1	5	(Switzerland) Jo Siffert	BRM	1:22.8	—
2	6	(United Kingdom) Peter Gethin	BRM	1:22.8	+0.0
3	8	(Brazil) Emerson Fittipaldi	Lotus-Cosworth	1:23.6	+0.8
4	4	(Sweden) Ronnie Peterson	March-Cosworth	1:23.6	+0.8
5	17	(United Kingdom) Mike Hailwood	Surtees-Cosworth	1:23.8	+1.0
6	1	(United Kingdom) Jackie Stewart	Tyrrell-Cosworth	1:23.8	+1.0
7	12	(Australia) Tim Schenken	Brabham-Cosworth	1:23.8	+1.0
8	7	(New Zealand) Howden Ganley	BRM	1:24.2	+1.4
9	10	(United Kingdom) Jackie Oliver	McLaren-Cosworth	1:24.6	+1.8
10	16	(United Kingdom) John Surtees	Surtees-Cosworth	1:24.6	+1.8
11	14	(Argentina) Carlos Reutemann	Brabham-Cosworth	1:24.6	+1.8
12	11	(United Kingdom) Graham Hill	Brabham-Cosworth	1:24.8	+2.0
13	2	(France) François Cevert	Tyrrell-Cosworth	1:25.0	+2.2
14	23	(Australia) Frank Gardner	Lola-Chevrolet	1:25.8	+3.0
15	15	(France) Henri Pescarolo	March-Cosworth	1:26.2	+3.4
16	77	(United Kingdom) Mike Walker	Lola-Chevrolet	1:27.0	+4.2
17	26	(United Kingdom) Alan Rollinson	Surtees-Chevrolet	1:27.0	+4.2
18	21	(Sweden) Reine Wisell	McLaren-Chevrolet	1:27.0	+4.2
19	25	(United Kingdom) Keith Holland	McLaren-Chevrolet	1:27.6	+4.8
20	44	(United Kingdom) Gordon Spice	McLaren-Chevrolet	1:28.2	+5.4
21	28	(United Kingdom) Ray Allen	McLaren-Chevrolet	1:28.4	+5.6
22	33	(Belgium) Teddy Pilette	McLaren-Chevrolet	1:28.4	+5.6
23	41	(United Kingdom) Trevor Taylor	Leda-Chevrolet	1:29.2	+6.4
24	40	(United Kingdom) Ian Ashley	Lola-Chevrolet	1:29.6	+6.8
25	27	(United Kingdom) David Prophet	McLaren-Chevrolet	1:29.6	+6.8
26	24	(United Kingdom) Guy Edwards	McLaren-Chevrolet	1:31.0	+8.2
27	66	(United Kingdom) Fred Saunders	Crosslé-Rover	1:32.2	+9.4

== Race ==
Although the race only lasted for less than half of its intended distance, there were several incidents. On lap 2, Henri Pescarolo and Reine Wisell collided at the Druids hairpin, with both cars retiring. Then Mike Hailwood and Ronnie Peterson also collided and had to pit for repairs. Hailwood's car was deemed unfit to continue, but Peterson rejoined the race, albeit nearly a lap down. Jo Siffert had fallen several places at the start, but had made his way back to 4th by lap 14. Approaching Hawthorn Bend at high speed on lap 15, Siffert's BRM suffered a mechanical failure which pitched it across the track into an earth bank. The car rolled over and caught fire, trapping Siffert underneath, and he died of smoke inhalation in the flames. The race was stopped with the track blocked, and all the cars were stranded out on the circuit except for John Surtees, who was able to drive around to the pits, his car damaged by debris.

== Results ==
Pos	No.	Driver	Entrant	Constructor	Time/Retired	Grid
1	6	(United Kingdom) Peter Gethin	Yardley-BRM	BRM	19:54.4	2
2	8	(Brazil) Emerson Fittipaldi	Gold Leaf Team Lotus	Lotus-Cosworth	+ 0.2 s	3
3	1	(United Kingdom) Jackie Stewart	Elf Team Tyrrell	Tyrrell-Cosworth	+ 5.4 s	6
4	5	(Switzerland) Jo Siffert	Yardley-BRM	BRM	+ 12.8 s	1
5	12	(Australia) Tim Schenken	Motor Racing Developments	Brabham-Cosworth	+ 15.6 s	7
6	16	(United Kingdom) John Surtees	Team Surtees	Surtees-Cosworth	+ 16.0 s	10
7	2	(France) François Cevert	Elf Team Tyrrell	Tyrrell-Cosworth	+ 24.8 s	13
8	11	(United Kingdom) Graham Hill	Motor Racing Developments	Brabham-Cosworth	+ 31.6 s	12
9	14	(Argentina) Carlos Reutemann	Motor Racing Developments	Brabham-Cosworth	+ 33.4 s	11
10	26	(United Kingdom) Alan Rollinson	Alan Rollinson	Surtees-Chevrolet	+ 56.4 s	17
11	23	(Australia) Frank Gardner	Motor Racing Research	Lola-Chevrolet	+ 56.6 s	14
12	77	(United Kingdom) Mike Walker	Doug Hardwick	Lola-Chevrolet	+ 58.0 s	16
13	44	(United Kingdom) Gordon Spice	Gordon Spice	McLaren-Chevrolet	+ 1:10.2 s	20
14	33	(Belgium) Teddy Pilette	Racing Team VDS	McLaren-Chevrolet	+ 1:11.4 s	22
15	25	(United Kingdom) Keith Holland	Keith Holland	McLaren-Chevrolet	+ 1:12.2 s	19
16	4	(Sweden) Ronnie Peterson	STP March	March-Cosworth	+ 1:15.8 s	4
17	28	(United Kingdom) Ray Allen	Team Trojan	McLaren-Chevrolet	13 laps	21
18	40	(United Kingdom) Ian Ashley	Kaye Griffiths	Lola-Chevrolet	13 laps	24
19	27	(United Kingdom) David Prophet	David Prophet Racing	McLaren-Chevrolet	13 laps	25
20	24	(United Kingdom) Guy Edwards	J.T. Butterworth	McLaren-Chevrolet	12 laps	26
Ret	10	(United Kingdom) Jackie Oliver	Bruce McLaren Motor Racing	McLaren-Cosworth	Brakes	9
Ret	41	(United Kingdom) Trevor Taylor	Malaya Garages	Leda-Chevrolet	Overheating	23
Ret	7	(New Zealand) Howden Ganley	Yardley-BRM	BRM	Engine	8
Ret	17	(United Kingdom) Mike Hailwood	Team Surtees	Surtees-Cosworth	Suspension (collision)	5
Ret	66	(United Kingdom) Fred Saunders	Fred Saunders	Crosslé-Rover	Engine fire	27
Ret	15	(France) Henri Pescarolo	Frank Williams Racing Cars	March-Cosworth	Collision	15
Ret	21	(Sweden) Reine Wisell	Sid Taylor	McLaren-Chevrolet	Collision	18

Previous race: 1971 International Gold Cup	Formula One non-championship races 1971 season	Next race: 1972 Race of Champions
Previous race: -	World Championship Victory Race	Next race: 1972 World Championship Victory Race
