= 1971 Questor Grand Prix =

- Non-championship race in the 1971 Formula One season
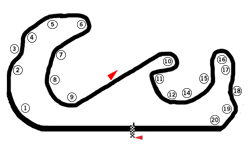

Race details
- Date: March 28, 1971
- Official name: Questor Grand Prix
- Location: Ontario Motor Speedway, California, United States
- Course: Permanent racing facility
- Course length: 5.141 km (3.194 miles)
- Distance: 64 laps, 329.02 km (204.42 miles)

Pole position
Driver	(United Kingdom) Jackie Stewart	Tyrrell-Cosworth
- Time: 1:41.257

Fastest lap
Driver	(Mexico) Pedro Rodriguez	BRM
- Time: 1:42.777

Podium
First	(United States) Mario Andretti	Ferrari
Second	(United Kingdom) Jackie Stewart	Tyrrell-Cosworth
Third	(New Zealand) Denny Hulme	McLaren-Cosworth

The Questor Grand Prix was a non-championship race for Formula One and Formula 5000 cars held on 28 March 1971 to inaugurate a new racing facility in California, the Ontario Motor Speedway, built by the Questor conglomerate.

Because of the smaller fuel tanks of the F5000 cars, the race was run in two heats of 32 laps, and the final result decided by a points system. Jackie Stewart qualified on pole for Heat 1 and finished runner-up behind Mario Andretti. Chris Amon set fastest lap. Andretti and Stewart again finished first and second in Heat 2 and Pedro Rodriguez set fastest lap, quicker than Amon's time in Heat 1. Andretti was declared the winner; with Stewart in second place and Denny Hulme third. Mark Donohue was the best-placed F5000 finisher in Heat 1, and Ron Grable best in Heat 2. Grable was also the best-placed F5000 driver on aggregate.

During free practice on Wednesday, Andretti had heavily crashed his Ferrari. The team chief mechanic, Giulio Borsari, managed to rebuild the car overnight by using the one of Andretti's team mate Jacky Ickx as a reference point with the aid of a local welder. After Andretti won the race, Borsari was awarded the Mechanic of the Race trophy along with a $500 prize.

Hopes for a regular fixture rapidly faded due to financial problems. The Questor Grand Prix remained a one-off event and the Ontario Motor Speedway was never again used to host a Formula One race.

== Qualifying ==
Note: a blue background indicates a Formula 5000 entrant.

Pos.	No.	Driver	Entrant	Car	Lap	Gap
1	8	(United Kingdom) Jackie Stewart	Elf Team Tyrrell	Tyrrell 001-Cosworth	1:41.257	
2	10	(New Zealand) Chris Amon	Equipe Matra Sports	Matra MS120B	1:41.275	+0.018
3	4	(Belgium) Jacky Ickx	Scuderia Ferrari SpA SEFAC	Ferrari 312B	1:41.531	+0.256
4	6	(New Zealand) Denis Hulme	Bruce McLaren Motor Racing	McLaren M19A-Cosworth	1:42.458	+0.927
5	12	(Mexico) Pedro Rodriguez	Yardley Team BRM	BRM P160	1:42.473	+0.015
6	19	(United Kingdom) Graham Hill	Motor Racing Developments	Brabham BT34-Cosworth	1:42.763	+0.290
7	26	(United States) Mark Donohue	Sunoco Penske Racing	Lola T192-Chevrolet	1:43.211	+0.448
8	14	(Switzerland) Jo Siffert	Yardley Team BRM	BRM P160	1:43.350	+0.139
9	2	(Brazil) Emerson Fittipaldi	Gold Leaf Team Lotus	Lotus 72C-Cosworth	1:43.358	+0.008
10	27	(United States) George Follmer	Brian O'Neil Racing	Lotus 70B-Ford	1:43.474	+0.116
11	3	(Sweden) Reine Wisell	Gold Leaf Team Lotus	Lotus 72C-Cosworth	1:43.535	+0.061
12	5	(United States) Mario Andretti	Scuderia Ferrari	Ferrari 312B	1:43.542	+0.007
13	18	(France) Henri Pescarolo	Motul/Frank Williams Racing Cars	March 711-Cosworth	1:43.709	+0.167
14	20	(Australia) Tim Schenken	Motor Racing Developments	Brabham BT33-Cosworth	1:43.772	+0.063
15	30	(United States) Sam Posey	Champ Carr Inc	Surtees TS8-Chevrolet	1:44.128	+0.356
16	25	(Canada) John Cannon	STP Corporation	March 701-Cosworth	1:44.231	+0.103
17	21	(Sweden) Ronnie Peterson	STP March Engineering	March 711-Cosworth	1:44.360	+0.129
18	15	(New Zealand) Howden Ganley	Yardley Team BRM	BRM P153	1:44.379	+0.019
19	17	(United Kingdom) Derek Bell	Motul/Frank Williams Racing Cars	March 701-Cosworth	1:44.977	+0.598
20	7	(United Kingdom) Peter Gethin	Bruce McLaren Motor Racing	McLaren M14A-Cosworth	1:45.310	+0.333
21	37	(United States) Lou Sell	Smothers Brothers Racing Team	Lola T192-Chevrolet	1:45.397	+0.087
22	29	(United States) Ron Grable	Charlie Hayes Racing	Lola T190/T192-Chevrolet	1:45.402	+0.005
23	35	(United States) Bob Bondurant	Competition Developments	Lola T192-Chevrolet	1:45.528	+0.126
24	31	(United States) Peter Revson	Milestone Racing Team	Surtees TS8-Chevrolet	1:45.668	+0.140
25	34	(United States) Tony Adamowicz	American Racing Associates	Lola T192-Chevrolet	1:47.831	+2.163
26	33	(United States) Al Unser	Kastner Brophy Racing	Lola T192-Chevrolet	1:48.172	+0.341
27	38	(United States) Bobby Unser	Charlie Hayes Racing	Lola T190/T192	1:48.512	+0.340
28	36	(United States) Gus Hutchison	Aero Structures Developments	ASD American Mk 1-Chevrolet	1:50.954	+2.442
29	32	(United States) Swede Savage	Junior Tarozzi Racing/Keith Black Racing	Eagle Mk.5-Plymouth	1:51.509	+0.555
30	28	(United States) A. J. Foyt	Agapiou Brothers/Young American Racing	McLaren M10B-Chevrolet	1:52.229	+0.720
DNQ	45	(United Kingdom) David Hobbs^{1}	Carl Hogan Racing	McLaren M10B-Chevrolet	1:45.331	-
DNQ	40	(United States) Pete Lovely^{1}	Pete Lovely VW Inc	Lotus 49B-Cosworth	1:47.269	-
DNQ	47	(United States) Dow 'Jack' Byers^{1}	Competition Developments	Lola T190-Chevrolet	1:54.468	-
DNS	28	(United Kingdom) Jackie Stewart^{2}	Agapiou Brothers/Young American Racing	McLaren M10B-Chevrolet		
DNA	9	(France) Francois Cevert	Elf Team Tyrrell	Tyrrell 002-Cosworth		
DNA	11	(France) Jean-Pierre Beltoise	Equipe Matra Sports	Matra MS120		
DNA	16	(United Kingdom) John Surtees	Brooke-Bond-Oxo/Rob Walker/Team Surtees	Surtees TS9-Cosworth		
DNA	22	(Italy) Andrea de Adamich	STP March Engineering	March 711-Alfa Romeo		

^{1} Hobbs, Lovely and Byers were late entries and relegated to reserve drivers.
^{2} Stewart briefly drove Foyt's car in qualifying.

== Classification ==
Note: a blue background indicates a Formula 5000 entrant.

Pos.	No.	Driver	Constructor	Grid	Heat 1	Heat 2	Final Pos.	Points
1	5	(United States) Mario Andretti	Ferrari	12	1; 56:03.052, 176.07 km/h	1; 55:45.358	1:51:48.410	80
2	8	(United Kingdom) Jackie Stewart	Tyrrell-Cosworth	1	2; 56:06.052	2; 55:57.658	1:52:04.324	70
3	6	(New Zealand) Denis Hulme	McLaren-Cosworth	4	4/32 laps	5/32 laps	1:53:16.982	58
4	10	(New Zealand) Chris Amon	Matra	2	6/32 laps	3; 55:57.939	1:53:29.684	58
5	20	(Australia) Tim Schenken	Brabham-Cosworth	14	7/31 laps	6/32 laps	63 laps	50
6	14	(Switzerland) Jo Siffert	BRM	8	3; 56:48.381	13/28 laps	60 laps	50
7	29	(United States) Ron Grable	Lola-Chevrolet	22	10/31 laps	7/32 laps	63 laps	45
8	7	(United Kingdom) Peter Gethin	McLaren-Cosworth	20	11/31 laps	8/32 laps	63 laps	43
9	15	(New Zealand) Howden Ganley	BRM	18	8/31 laps	11/30 laps	61 laps	43
10	12	(Mexico) Pedro Rodriguez	BRM	5	20/21 laps	4/32 laps	53 laps	43
11	4	(Belgium) Jacky Ickx	Ferrari	3	5/32 laps	Ret/2 laps, puncture	34 laps	38
12	25	(Canada) John Cannon	March-Cosworth	16	15/30 laps, throttle	9/31 laps	61 laps	38
13	37	(United States) Lou Sell	Lola-Chevrolet	21	14/30 laps	12/29 laps	59 laps	36
14	26	(United States) Mark Donohue	Lola-Chevrolet	7	9/31 laps	Ret/5 laps, fuel pressure	36 laps	32
15	17	(United Kingdom) Derek Bell	March-Cosworth	19	13/31 laps	Ret/15 laps, suspension	36 laps	32
16	38	(United States) Bobby Unser	Lola-Chevrolet	27	12/31 laps	Ret/9 laps, engine	40 laps	30
17	21	(Sweden) Ronnie Peterson	March-Cosworth	17	16/26 laps, suspension	17 laps	43 laps	30
18	36	(United States) Gus Hutchison	ASD-Chevrolet	28	19/25 laps	14/27 laps	52 laps	29
19	34	(United States) Tony Adamowicz	Lola-Chevrolet	25	Ret/12 laps	10/31 laps	45 laps	27
20	2	(Brazil) Emerson Fittipaldi	Lotus-Cosworth	9	17/25 laps	Ret/10 laps, gear linkage	35 laps	26
21	30	(United States) Sam Posey	Surtees-Chevrolet	15	18/25 laps, overheating	Ret/13 laps, engine	38 laps	26
22	18	(France) Henri Pescarolo	March-Cosworth	13	Ret/16 laps, bodywork	Ret/24 laps, suspension	40 laps	25
23	3	(Sweden) Reine Wisell	Lotus-Cosworth	11	Ret/17 laps, ignition	DNS	17 laps	17
24	33	(United States) Al Unser	Lola-Chevrolet	26	Ret/16 laps, oil pressure	DNS	16 laps	14
25	35	(United States) Bob Bondurant	Lola-Chevrolet	23	Ret/15 laps, engine	DNS	15 laps	12
26	28	(United States) A. J. Foyt	McLaren-Chevrolet	30	Ret/6 laps, handling	Ret/2 laps, engine	8 laps	11
27	31	(United States) Peter Revson	Surtees-Chevrolet	24	Ret/11 laps, gearbox	DNS	11 laps	9
28	32	(United States) Swede Savage	Eagle-Plymouth	29	Ret/11 laps, accident	DNS	11 laps	7
29	19	(United Kingdom) Graham Hill	Brabham-Cosworth	6	Ret/8 laps, oil pipe	DNS	8 laps	5
30	27	(United States) George Follmer	Lotus-Ford	10	Ret/3 laps, rocker arm	DNS	3 laps	2

Previous race: 1971 Race of Champions	Formula One non-championship races 1971 season	Next race: 1971 Spring Trophy
Previous race: None	Questor Grand Prix	Next race: None
