= 1971 Jochen Rindt Gedächtnisrennen =

- Non-championship race in the 1971 Formula One season

Race details
- Date: 13 June 1971
- Official name: Jochen Rindt Gedächtnisrennen
- Location: Hockenheimring
- Course: Permanent racing facility
- Course length: 6.743 km (4.19 miles)
- Distance: 35 laps, 236.011 km (146.64 miles)

Pole position
Driver	(Belgium) Jacky Ickx	Scuderia Ferrari
- Time: 1:56.8

Fastest lap
Driver	(Belgium) Jacky Ickx	Scuderia Ferrari
- Time: 1:58.8

Podium
First	(Belgium) Jacky Ickx	Scuderia Ferrari
Second	(Sweden) Ronnie Peterson	March
Third	(United Kingdom) John Surtees	Surtees

The Jochen Rindt Memorial (German: Jochen Rindt Gedächtnisrennen) or the VI Rhein-Pokalrennen was a motor race, run to Formula One rules, held on 13 June 1971 at the Hockenheimring, Germany. The race was run over 35 laps of the circuit, and was dominated by Belgian driver Jacky Ickx in a Ferrari 312B.

The race was arranged after the Belgian Grand Prix of 1971 was cancelled, in order to fill the gap between the Monaco Grand Prix and the Dutch Grand Prix. The German Grand Prix had returned to the Nürburgring, so the Hockenheim circuit was chosen for the race, which was also a memorial race for Jochen Rindt, the reigning World Champion who had been killed at the 1970 Italian Grand Prix.

On the same weekend, the 1971 24 Hours of Le Mans was being held, so several of the regular Formula One drivers were absent from this race, including Chris Amon, Jean-Pierre Beltoise, Henri Pescarolo, Pedro Rodríguez and Jo Siffert. There were other absentees: Jackie Stewart and Denny Hulme were taking part in the Labatt's 200 Can-Am race, and Emerson Fittipaldi was recovering from a road accident. Of the regular Formula One teams, Matra were at Le Mans, Brabham were still repairing Graham Hill's car after an accident in Monaco, and Tyrrell elected not to take part. Scuderia Ferrari had entered a car for Mario Andretti, but had originally been scheduled for a USAC Championship Trail race at Langhorne Speedway that was cancelled ten days prior and was recovering from burns from a methanol fire at the Rex Mays 150 at The Milwaukee Mile.

As a tribute to Rindt, pole position on the grid was left vacant, leaving polesitter Ickx alone on the front row, taking the second slot.

== Qualifying ==
The practice sessions were dominated by the Ferraris, with Ickx lapping comfortably faster than he had done on his last visit to the circuit, for the 1970 German Grand Prix. The gas turbine Lotus 56B of Dave Walker suffered an engine fire during practice, and Walker took over Tony Trimmer's car for the race. Robert Lamplough and Bernd Terbeck were driving old BRMs recently bought from the factory, and although Lamplough qualified his P133 relatively well, Terbeck's even older P126 blew its engine and he was unable to start the race.

Pos	No.	Driver	Constructor	Lap	Gap
1	4	(Belgium) Jacky Ickx	Ferrari	1:56.8	—
2	5	(Switzerland) Clay Regazzoni	Ferrari	1:57.7	+0.9
3	8	(Sweden) Reine Wisell	Lotus-Cosworth	1:59.6	+2.8
4	16	(New Zealand) Howden Ganley	BRM	2:00.5	+3.7
5	21	(United Kingdom) Peter Gethin	McLaren-Cosworth	2:01.0	+4.2
6	10	(Sweden) Ronnie Peterson	March-Cosworth	2:01.5	+4.7
7	2	(United Kingdom) John Surtees	Surtees-Cosworth	2:01.5	+4.7
8	3	(Germany) Rolf Stommelen	Surtees-Cosworth	2:02.1	+5.3
9	12	(Italy) Nanni Galli	March-Cosworth	2:02.1	+5.3
10	9	(Australia) Dave Walker	Lotus-Cosworth	2:02.8	+6.0
11	17	(United Kingdom) John Miles	BRM	2:02.9	+6.1
12	22	(United Kingdom) Mike Beuttler	March-Cosworth	2:03.1	+6.3
13	24	(United Kingdom) Robert Lamplough	BRM	2:03.2	+6.4
14	19	(United States) Skip Barber	March-Cosworth	2:06.8	+10.0
15	7	(United Kingdom) Tony Trimmer	Lotus-Cosworth	2:08.1	+11.3
16	11	(Spain) Alex Soler-Roig	March-Cosworth	2:13.3	+16.5
17	23	(Switzerland) Xavier Perrot	March-Cosworth	2:16.0	+19.2
18	15	(United Kingdom) Ray Allen	March-Cosworth	2:20.4	+23.6
19	25	(Germany) Bernd Terbeck	BRM	2:31.7	+34.9

== Race ==
Ickx started well and pulled away from team-mate Clay Regazzoni in second, with Ronnie Peterson following behind. Ickx stayed in front for the whole race, although Regazzoni stopped after three laps with a mechanical fault which ultimately cost him ten laps after a mechanic had to go out to fix it.

As the race continued, Reine Wisell passed Peterson and was catching Ickx when he pitted with brake problems. Wisell lost two laps while his brakes were bled. Peterson himself encountered a clutch fault and began to fall further behind Ickx. Peter Gethin retired on lap four with a broken throttle, and John Miles had to retire three laps later with an engine fault. Ray Allen dropped out at the back of the field with a fuel leak on lap 15.

By this time, John Surtees had passed Howden Ganley for third, with Nanni Galli's ailing March in fifth. Rolf Stommelen missed a chicane while racing with Walker and Skip Barber, and the German was later given a one-minute penalty for this transgression. At the chequered flag, Ickx finished almost a minute ahead of Peterson, with Surtees over 20 seconds behind the Swede.

== Results ==
Pos	No.	Driver	Entrant	Constructor	Time/Retired	Grid
1	4	(Belgium) Jacky Ickx	Scuderia Ferrari	Ferrari	1.10:11.7	1
2	10	(Sweden) Ronnie Peterson	STP-March	March-Cosworth	+ 53.8 s	6
3	2	(United Kingdom) John Surtees	Team Surtees	Surtees-Cosworth	+ 1:17.0 s	7
4	16	(New Zealand) Howden Ganley	Yardley-BRM	BRM	+ 1:32.1 s	4
5	12	(Italy) Nanni Galli	STP-March	March-Cosworth	+ 1:45.2 s	9
6	19	(United States) Skip Barber	Gene Mason Racing	March-Cosworth	34 laps	14
7	3	(Germany) Rolf Stommelen	Team Surtees	Surtees-Cosworth	34 laps	8
8	11	(Spain) Alex Soler-Roig	STP-March	March-Cosworth	34 laps	16
9	7	(Australia) Dave Walker	Gold Leaf Team Lotus	Lotus-Cosworth	34 laps	10
10	8	(Sweden) Reine Wisell	Gold Leaf Team Lotus	Lotus-Cosworth	33 laps	3
11	23	(Switzerland) Xavier Perrot	Jo Siffert Automobiles	March-Cosworth	31 laps	17
12	24	(United Kingdom) Robert Lamplough	R. Lamplough Racing	BRM	31 laps	13
NC	22	(United Kingdom) Mike Beuttler	Clarke Mordaunt Racing	March-Cosworth	28 laps - gear selector	12
NC	5	(Switzerland) Clay Regazzoni	Scuderia Ferrari	Ferrari	25 laps - electrics	2
Ret	15	(United Kingdom) Ray Allen	Frank Williams Racing Cars	March-Cosworth	14 laps - fuel leak	18
Ret	17	(United Kingdom) John Miles	Yardley-BRM	BRM	6 laps - cylinder liner	11
Ret	21	(United Kingdom) Peter Gethin	Bruce McLaren Motor Racing	McLaren-Cosworth	4 laps - throttle linkage	5
DNS	7	(United Kingdom) Tony Trimmer	Gold Leaf Team Lotus	Lotus-Cosworth	Walker drove car	(15)
DNS	25	(Germany) Bernd Terbeck	R. Lamplough Racing	BRM	Engine in practice	(19)
DNA	6	(United States) Mario Andretti	Scuderia Ferrari	Ferrari	Driver injured	-
DNA	14	(France) Henri Pescarolo	Frank Williams Racing Cars	March-Cosworth	Driver at Le Mans	-
DNA	18	(Mexico) Pedro Rodríguez	Yardley-BRM	BRM	Driver at Le Mans	-
DNA	20	(Italy) Andrea de Adamich		Surtees-Cosworth		-
Sources:

- Stommelen finished sixth on the track, but was penalised one minute for missing the chicane, demoting him to seventh.

Previous race: 1971 BRDC International Trophy	Formula One non-championship races 1971 season	Next race: 1971 International Gold Cup
Previous race: —	Jochen Rindt Gedächtnisrennen	Next race: —
