= European Formula 5000 Championship =

The European Formula 5000 Championship was a motor racing series for Formula 5000 cars held annually from 1969 to 1975. It was organized in the United Kingdom by the British Racing and Sports Car Club with each championship also including rounds held at European circuits.

The championship was first run in 1969 as the Guards Formula 5000 Championship. Various sponsorship and name changes followed, with the series run as the Guards European Formula 5000 Championship in 1970, the Rothmans F5000 European Championship in 1971 and 1972, the Rothmans 5000 European Championship in 1973 and 1974 and finally as the ShellSport 5000 European Championship in 1975.

The series was replaced by the Shellsport International Series in 1976 with Formula One, Formula Two and Formula Atlantic cars also eligible to compete.

== Championship results ==
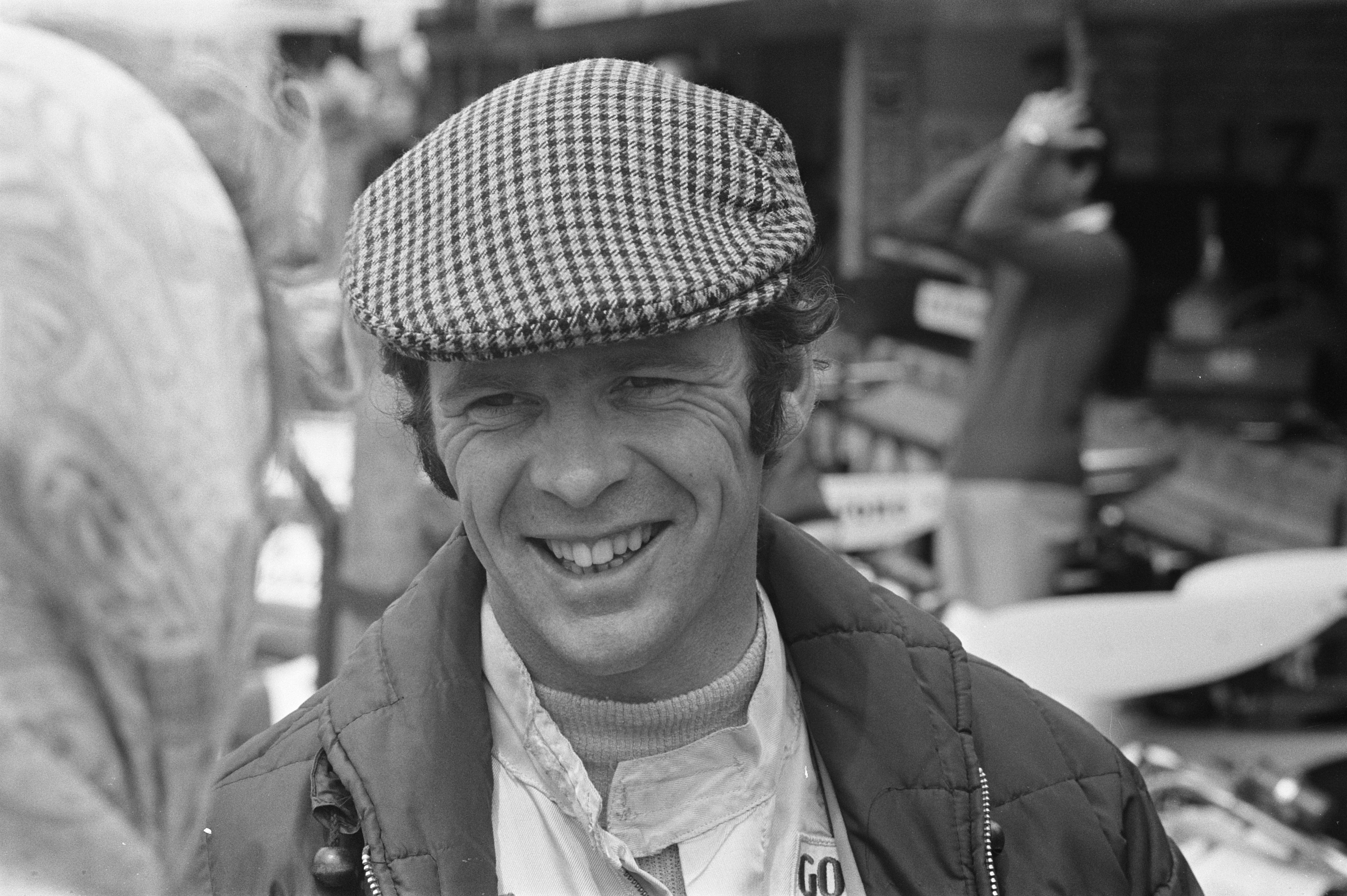
Peter Gethin won the championship in 1969 and 1970

Year	Championship	Winning driver	Car
1969	Guards Formula 5000 Championship	(United Kingdom) Peter Gethin	McLaren M10A Chevrolet
1970	Guards European Formula 5000 Championship	(United Kingdom) Peter Gethin	McLaren M10B Chevrolet
1971	Rothmans F5000 European Championship	(Australia) Frank Gardner	Lola T192 Chevrolet; Lola T300 Chevrolet
1972	Rothmans F5000 European Championship	(Netherlands) Gijs van Lennep	Surtees TS11 Chevrolet; McLaren M18 Chevrolet
1973	Rothmans 5000 European Championship	(Belgium) Teddy Pilette	McLaren M18 Chevrolet; Chevron B24 Chevrolet
1974	Rothmans 5000 European Championship	(United Kingdom) Bob Evans	Lola T332 Chevrolet
1975	ShellSPORT 5000 European Championship	(Belgium) Teddy Pilette	Lola T400 Chevrolet
