= 1971 Race of Champions =

- Non-championship race in the 1971 Formula One season

Race details
- Date: 21 March 1971
- Official name: VI Race of Champions
- Location: Brands Hatch
- Course: Permanent racing facility
- Course length: 4.265 km (2.65 miles)
- Distance: 50 laps, 213.25 km (132.5 miles)

Pole position
Driver	(United Kingdom) Jackie Stewart	Tyrrell-Cosworth
- Time: 1:24.6

Fastest lap
Driver	(United Kingdom) Graham Hill	Brabham-Cosworth
- Time: 1:26.7

Podium
First	(Switzerland) Clay Regazzoni	Ferrari
Second	(United Kingdom) Jackie Stewart	Tyrrell-Cosworth
Third	(United Kingdom) John Surtees	Surtees-Cosworth

The 6th Race of Champions was a non-Championship motor race, run to Formula One rules, held on 21 March 1971 at Brands Hatch circuit in Kent, England. The race was run over 50 laps of the circuit, and was won by Clay Regazzoni in a Ferrari 312B2.

== Classification ==
Pos.	No.	Driver	Entrant	Constructor	Laps	Time/Retired	Grid
1	5	(Switzerland) Clay Regazzoni	Scuderia Ferrari	Ferrari	50	1:13:35.0	3
2	17	(United Kingdom) Jackie Stewart	Tyrrell Racing Organisation	Tyrrell-Cosworth	50	+23.6	1
3	16	(United Kingdom) John Surtees	Team Surtees Ltd	Surtees-Cosworth	49	+ 1 lap	6
4	2	(Australia) Tim Schenken	Motor Racing Developments Ltd	Brabham-Cosworth	48	+ 2 laps	9
5	4	(New Zealand) Howden Ganley	BRM Ltd	BRM	48	+ 2 laps	10
6	14	(United Kingdom) Ray Allen	Frank Williams Racing Cars	March-Cosworth	48	+ 2 laps	12
7	3	(United Kingdom) John Miles	BRM Ltd	BRM	48	+ 2 laps	5
Ret	7	(Sweden) Reine Wisell	Team Lotus Ltd	Lotus-Cosworth	44	Engine	8
Ret	10	(United Kingdom) Peter Gethin	Bruce McLaren Motor Racing Ltd	McLaren-Cosworth	38	Water leak	11
Ret	1	(United Kingdom) Graham Hill	Motor Racing Developments Ltd	Brabham-Cosworth	35	Engine	4
Ret	9	(New Zealand) Denny Hulme	Bruce McLaren Motor Racing Ltd	McLaren-Cosworth	34	Ignition	2
Ret	6	(Brazil) Emerson Fittipaldi	Team Lotus Ltd	Lotus-Pratt & Whitney	34	Rear suspension	7
Ret	12	(Sweden) Ronnie Peterson	Frank Williams Racing Cars	March-Cosworth	14	Brakes	15
Ret	15	(United Kingdom) Mike Beuttler	Clarke-Mordaunt-Guthrie-Durlacher Racing	March-Cosworth	8	Fuel metering unit	13
Ret	8	(United Kingdom) Tony Trimmer	Team Lotus Ltd	Lotus-Cosworth	5	Fuel pump	14

Previous race: 1971 Argentine Grand Prix	Formula One non-championship races 1971 season	Next race: 1971 Questor Grand Prix
Previous race: 1970 Race of Champions	Race of Champions	Next race: 1972 Race of Champions
