= Surtees TS8 =

The Surtees TS8 is an open-wheel Formula 5000 race car, designed, developed and built by Surtees in 1971, and is closely based on their 1970 Surtees TS7 Formula One car. It featured a slightly longer wheelbase, and a 302 cu in (4,950 cm^{3}) Chevrolet small-block engine, producing 465 hp (347 kW), which was a stress member of the chassis, and drove the rear wheels through a Hewland D.G. 300 five-speed manual transmission. It won 6 races in total; 4 races with Mike Hailwood, and 2 races for Alan Rollinson. Hailwood eventually finished second-place as runner-up in the championship, with 58 points. It also competed in a bunch of non-championship Formula One Grand Prix races; with its best result being a 4th-place finish Oulton Park in 1971, being driven by Alan Rollinson.
