= McLaren M18 =

Open-wheel race car

- Category: Formula 5000
- Constructor: McLaren

Technical specifications
- Chassis: Steel and aluminium monocoque with load-bearing engine-transmission assembly
- Axle track: Front: 60 in (1,500 mm); Rear: 60 in (1,500 mm)
- Wheelbase: 100 in (2,500 mm)
- Engine: Mid-engine, longitudinally mounted, 4,940 cc (301.5 cu in), Chevrolet, 90° V8, NA
- Transmission: Hewland L.G.500 5-speed manual
- Weight: 1,470 lb (670 kg)

Competition history
- Notable drivers: (United Kingdom) Brian Redman
- Debut: 1971
Races	Wins
16	2

The McLaren M18 is an open-wheel Formula 5000 racing car designed and made by McLaren in 1971.

== Development ==
The car was conceived to participate in the 1971 Formula 5000 season to replace the M10.

== Design ==
The car was powered by a 470-hp Chevrolet V8, which drove the rear wheels through a five-speed manual gearbox.

== Racing history ==
The car, entrusted to the driver Brian Redman, did not have the hoped-for success and won only two of the 16 championship races.
