= McLaren M10 =

Formula 5000 car model

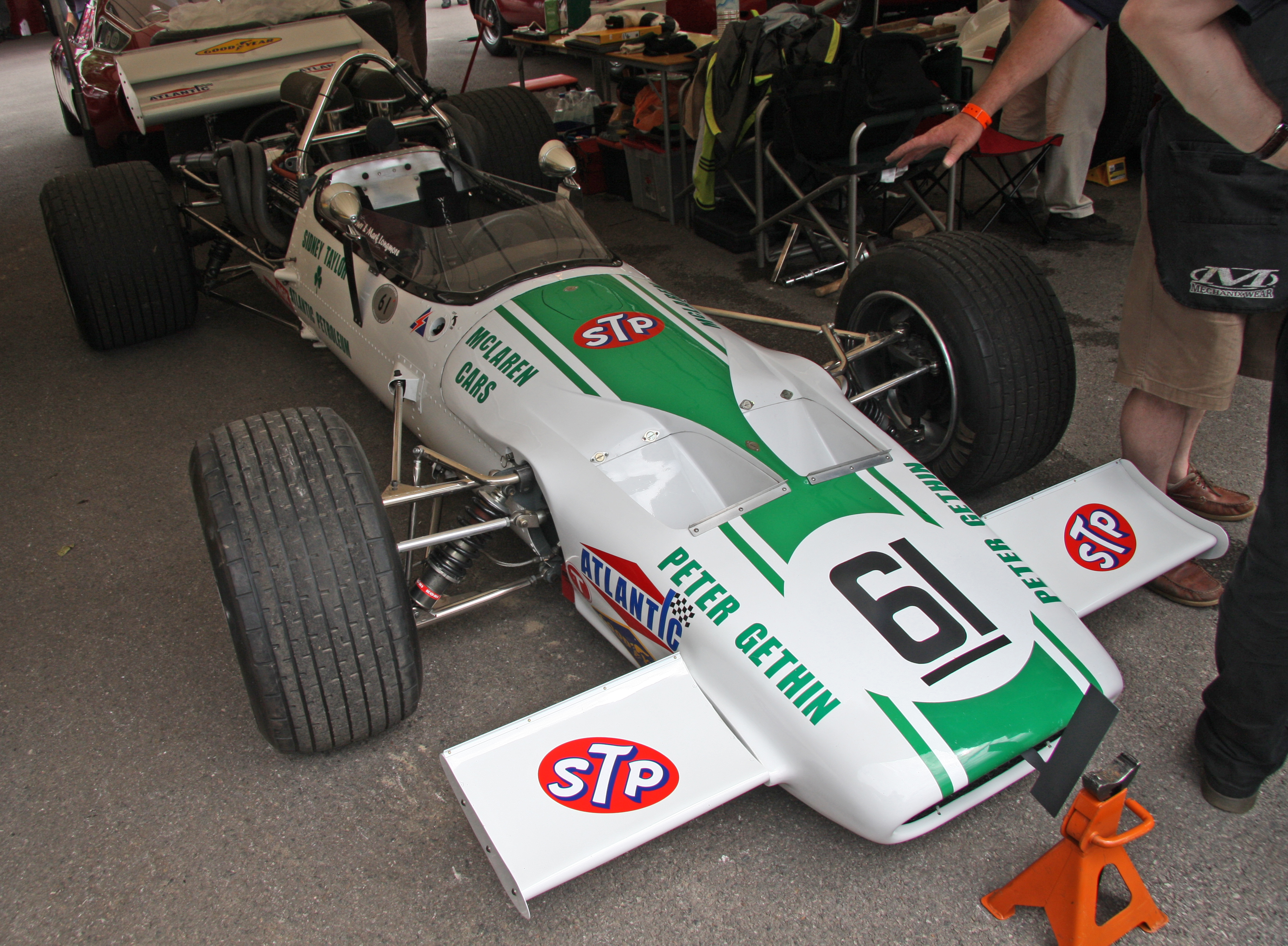
1970 McLaren M10B

The McLaren M10 was a Formula 5000 race car chassis built by McLaren that competed in North America, Europe, Australia and New Zealand between 1969 and 1973.

== Design ==
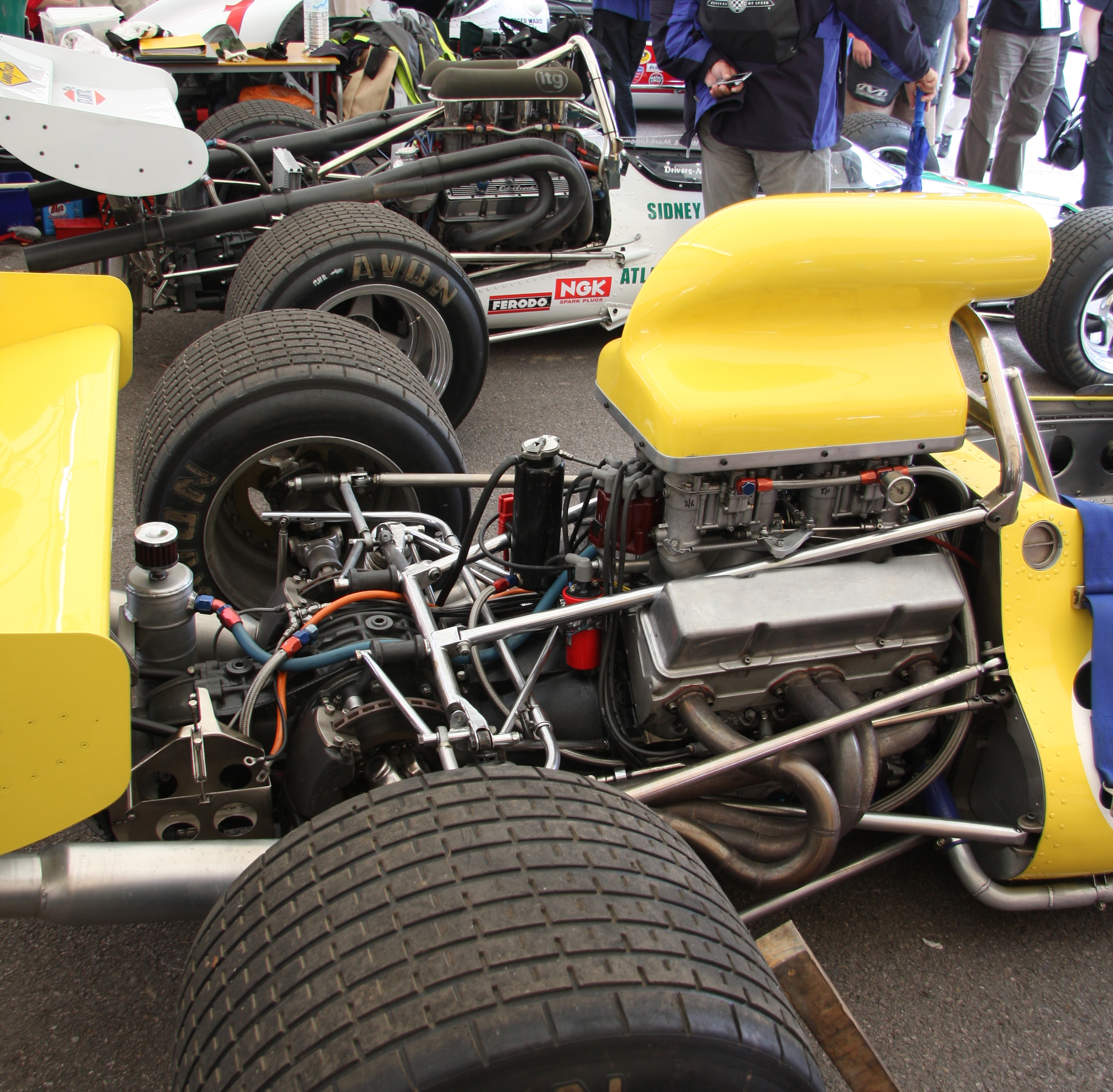
The Chevrolet small-block V-8 engine which powered the car

The McLaren M10 was manufactured in large numbers. Built close to the weight limit, it was very light and was powered by a 500+ hp Chevrolet V8 engine. The cars were not manufactured by McLaren itself, but by the British racing car manufacturer Trojan. Trojan was able to complete and deliver 17 of the originally ordered quantity of 50 vehicles.

== Racing history ==
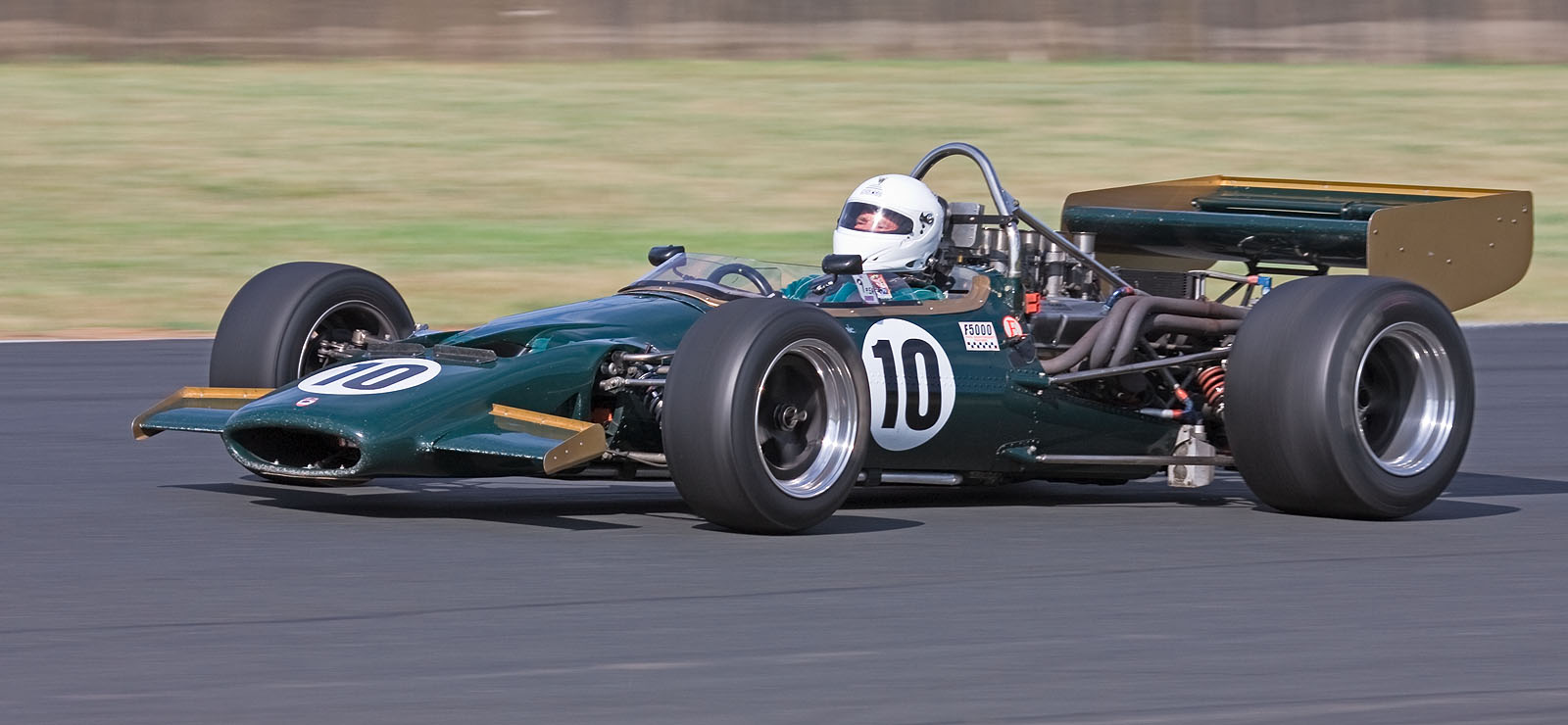
McLaren M10B at a historic event in 2008

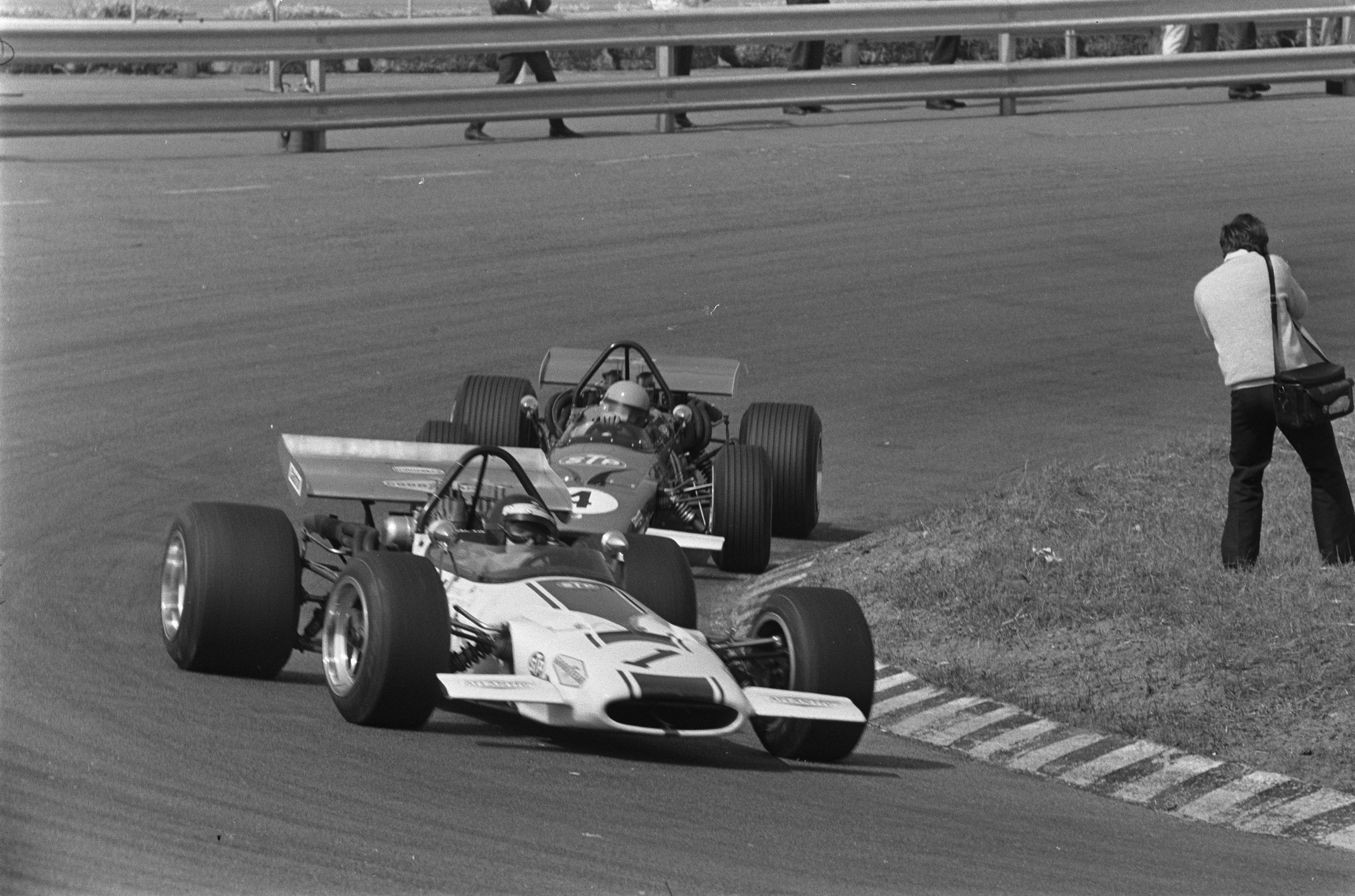
Cars competing in 1970

The M10 was the only Formula 5000 racing car to win the North American Formula 5000 Championship twice. In 1970, John Cannon won the championship with four race wins. A year later, Briton David Hobbs won the championship with victories at Seattle, Road America, Laguna Seca, Edmonton, and Lime Rock.

Australian driver Frank Matich drove a Repco-Holden V8 engine powered McLaren M10B to victory in the 1970 Australian Grand Prix at the Warwick Farm Raceway in Sydney. It was the first of 13 wins for McLaren in the Australian Grand Prix as of 2025 (not including Bruce McLaren's own AGP wins in 1962 and 1965).

The M10 was also used in the European Formula 5000 Championship. In the first season of this series, Peter Gethin won the championship title with an M10 fielded by Church Farm Racing.
