= Mallory Park =

Motor racing circuit

Mallory Park Circuit
- Superbike Circuit (2006–present)
- Location: Leicestershire, UK
- Coordinates: 52°35′55″N 1°20′16″W
- Broke ground: 1956
- Opened: 26 April 1956; 70 years ago (as hard-surfaced course)
- Major events: Current: Mallory Park Race of the Year (1958–1981, 1986–1992, 1994–2008, 2011, 2014, 2016–2018, 2021–present); Former: BSB (1987–2002, 2004–2010); Motocross World Championship (2008–2009); VSR V8 Trophy (2008); BOSS Formula (1996–1997); BSCC (1958, 1960, 1967–1969, 1971–1972, 1974–1976, 1978–1982); British F3 (1964–1982); Formula 5000 (1969–1975); Formula Two (1972–1973); ETCC (1963–1964)
- Website: https://www.malloryparkcircuit.com/

Car Circuit (1956–present)
- Length: 1.350 mi (2.173 km)
- Turns: 5
- Race lap record: 0:37.920 ( (United Kingdom) Nick Algar, Gould GR55, 2009, British Sprint Championship)

Superbike Circuit (2006–present)
- Length: 1.410 mi (2.269 km)
- Turns: 13
- Race lap record: 0:55.845 ( (Japan) Ryuichi Kiyonari, Honda CBR1000RR, 2007, BSB)

Motorcycle Short Circuit (2003–present)
- Length: 1.390 mi (2.237 km)
- Turns: 10
- Race lap record: 0:50.660 ( (United Kingdom) Bradley Ray, Suzuki GSX-R1000, 2017, SBK)

Oval Circuit (1956–present)
- Length: 1.000 mi (1.609 km)
- Turns: 4
- Race lap record: 0:33.840 ( (United Kingdom) Ian Fewings, Ford Mondeo, 1995, Super Touring)

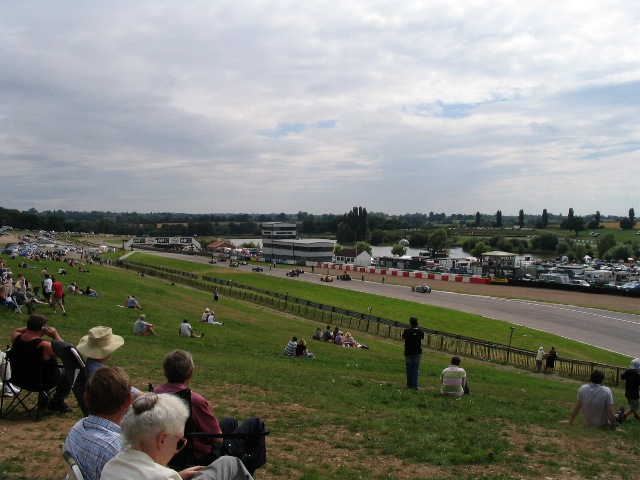
The start and finish area with lakes beyond

Mallory Park is a motor racing circuit situated in the village of Kirkby Mallory, just off the A47, between Leicester and Hinckley, in central England. Originally used for grass-track until 1955, a new, basically oval hard-surfaced course was constructed for 1956, with a later extension forming a loop with a hairpin bend.

With the car circuit measuring only 1.350 mi (2.173 km) it is amongst the shortest permanent race circuits in the UK. However, chicanes introduced to reduce speeds in motorcycle events mean that the Superbike Circuit is now slightly longer, at 1.410 mi (2.269 km). Shorter UK circuits are Lydden Hill, Brands Hatch Indy circuit, Scotland's Knockhill and Silverstone's diminutive Stowe circuit.

== The Circuit ==
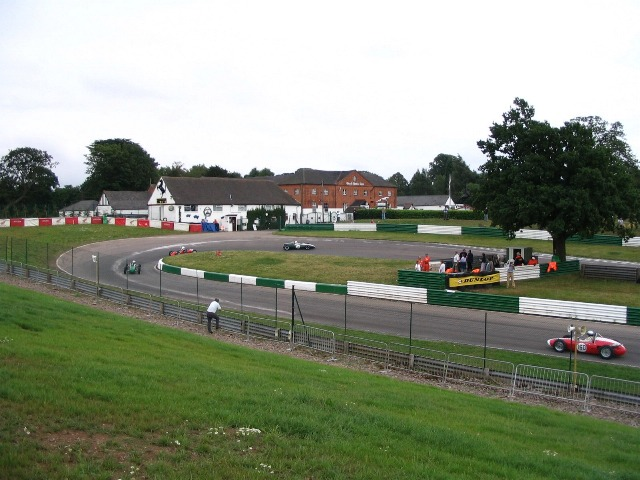
The Hairpin (aka Shaw's Corner)

The circuit has a number of formations, founded on a basic one-mile oval, with the majority of configurations including the northerly extension to the tight, 180° Shaw's Corner. When used without the hairpin-loop, to achieve the shorter-length lap (one mile) configuration, the link section was known as Castrol Chicane.

At the other end of the circuit lies the long right-hand Gerard's Bend. Gerard's is about a third of a mile long and turns through nearly 200°. It was named after local racing hero Bob Gerard, who opened the newly reconstructed circuit on 25 April 1956. Unusually, there are a number of large lakes occupying approximately half of the circuit infield. Despite its short length and Shaw's Corner, also known as The Hairpin, the tightest corner of any UK track (other than the hairpin on Cadwell Park's short circuit), Mallory is a fast circuit. To reduce speeds for motorcycle racing a pair of chicanes were introduced, together with a revised exit to Gerard's. Edwina's was added toward the end of the straight following Gerard's, named after former managing director of the circuit Edwina Overend, and the Bus Stop Chicane on the descent to the sweeping left kink, the Devil's Elbow, a blind, downhill, off camber left-hander before the start–finish line on Kirkby Straight. In 2003 a new complex was added toward the end of Gerard's curve. This sequence of bends was designed to reduce speeds on entry to Edwina's, and to prevent motorcycles from colliding as they jockey for position into the chicane. Mallory is the only major oval course remaining in Britain following the closure of Rockingham Motor Speedway.

Mallory Park does not have any true permanent garage facilities, although there are a handful of open garages in the pitlane.

== History ==
=== Origins – 1950s ===
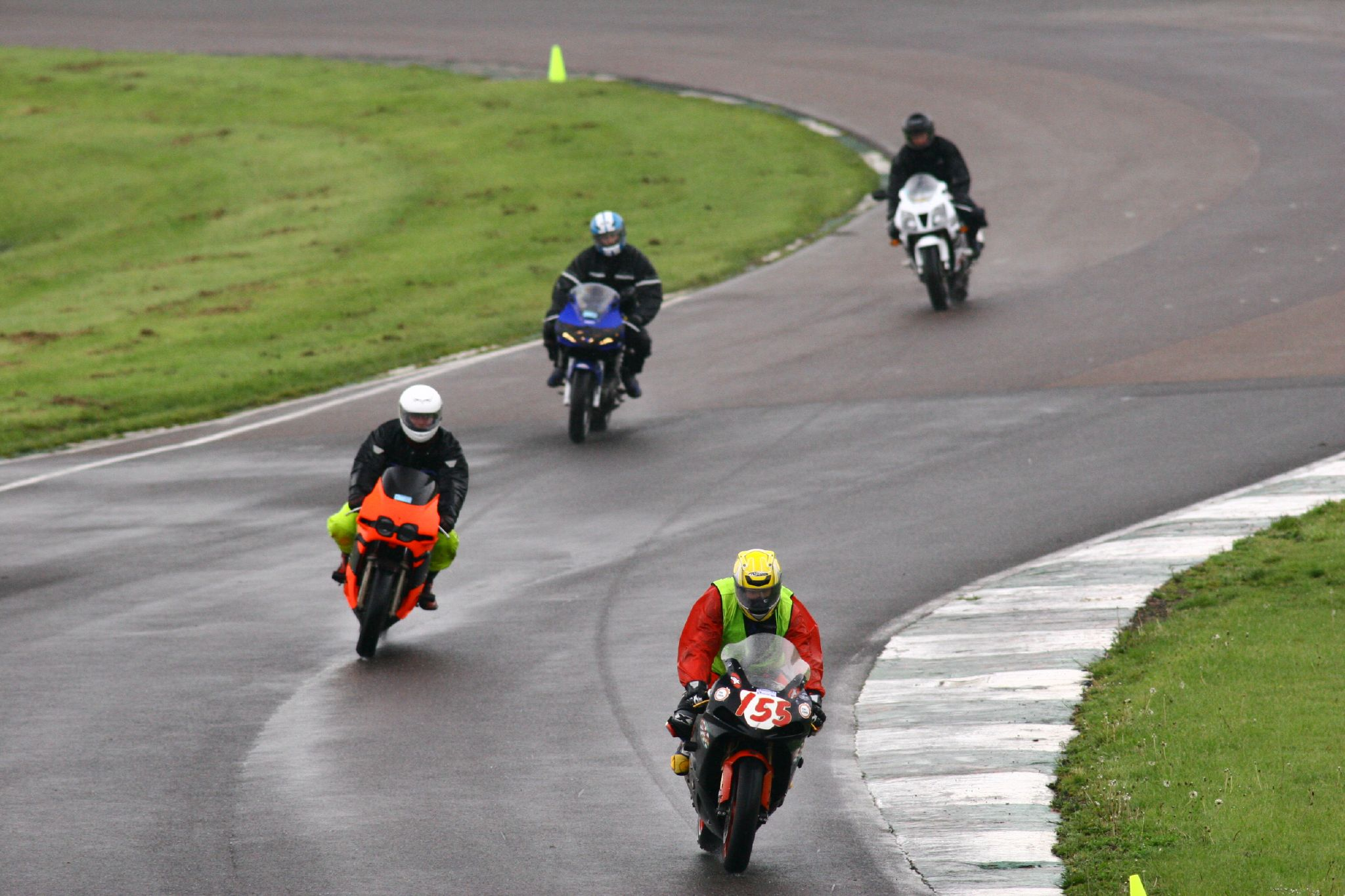
Motorcycle riders passing through the John Cooper Esses, taking part in a circuit track day

The estate at Mallory Park has many historical connections, the oldest being the unique Anglo-Saxons defended moat which is now known as Kirkby Moats, while a Roman road passes through the estate. Fast forward to the 18th century, when in 1762, Sir Edward Noel became Viscount Wentworth, the title descended on the distaff side. Lord Byron married into the Wentworth family and it is said on his visits to Mallory, he wrote beneath the shade of the Lebanon cedar tree which still stands in the grounds of Kirkby Hall. The last occupant of Kirkby Hall was Herbert Clarkson who died in 1941, when it was sold.

During the Second World War, the circuit started life as Royal Air Force Kirkby Mallory, a satellite landing ground (SLG) and closed in 1947. The hall was a large house which was demolished in 1952, leaving only the stable block and the coach house which now forms the circuit offices, workshops, hotel, pub and restaurant.

The estate of 300 acres was sold by auction in 1953 and was bought by a Mr. Moult of Derby who planned to have horse racing on the disused pony trotting track. Following the war, Mallory became a pony trotting circuit in the late 1940s, which defined the outline of the oval track still in use today. After the financial collapse of the equestrian club responsible for the circuit (Kirkby Mallory Racing Association), the track was hired by various motorcycle clubs for grass track motorcycle and motorcycle sidecar racing. For example, between September 1949 until 1954, the Leicester Query Motorcycle Club held grass track races. In 1955, the estate was purchased by Clive Wormleighton, under whose influence, the present tarmac was constructed at a cost of £60,000 in 1956. Upon completion of the building work, a circuit test was held on 26 April, when local Grand Prix driver Bob Gerard and Maurice Cann respectively conducted a Cooper-Bristol Formula Two car and a Moto Guzzi motorcycle around the track, Gerard managing an 81 mph lap.

The very first race was held on 29 April, when the Leicester Query Club organised a motorcycle meeting. A large crowd in excess of 20,000 spectators attended the Grand Opening event on 13 May 1956. 248 riders arrived in Leicestershire for this meeting, which saw George Salter set the first lap record at a speed of 84.08 mph, riding a Norton bike. Cars first appeared at the Whit Monday meeting, the event being organised by the Nottingham Sports Car Club. The first car race victory went to D. Rees in an Austin.

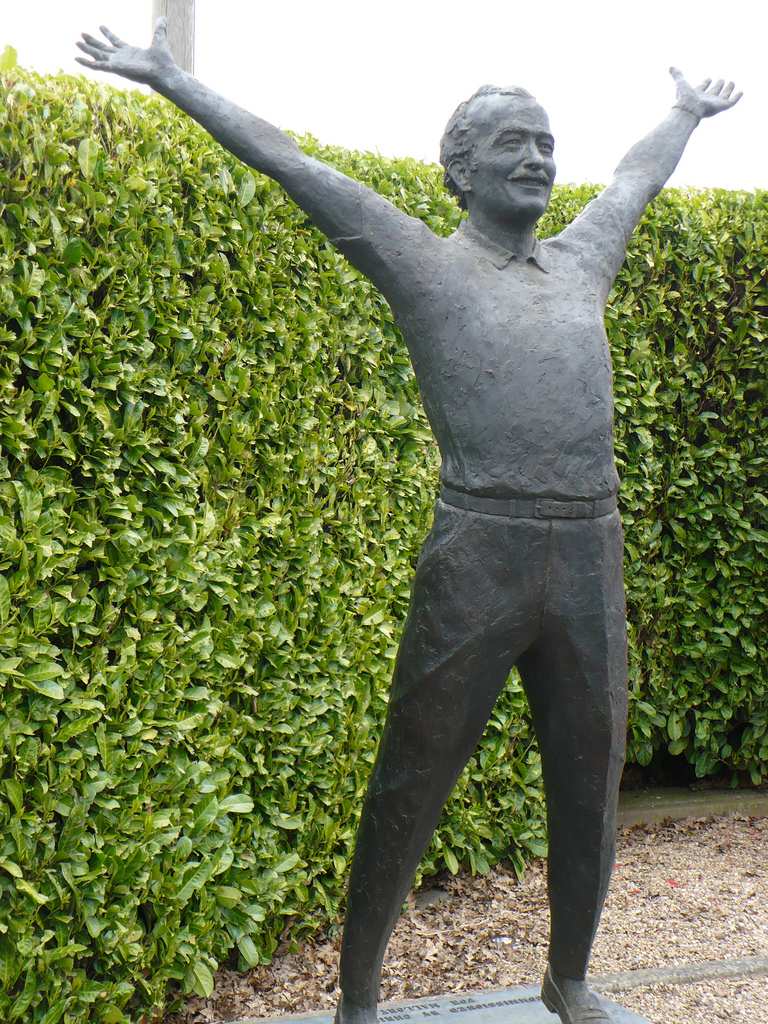
A statue of Lotus Cars and Team Lotus founder Colin Chapman, at the Hairpin Gate into the Mallory Park motor racing circuit

Many famous racing stars have raced at Mallory over the years, indeed a young John Surtees raced against his father, Jack Surtees. While Jack was a successful grass track racer at Mallory, John went on to be the only World Champion on both two and four wheels.

Famous competitors who have raced at Mallory, include John Surtees who won the first ‘Race of the Year’ in 1958. While the 1960 race saw Mike Hailwood win and set a new lap record of 89 mph. Both Hailwood and Surtees, along with Jim Clark and Colin Chapman, are commemorated with statues at the front gate. Around this time, Clive Wormleighton added the lakes, which were formed by adding the sluice gate across the Brook.

=== 1960s ===
Clive Wormleighton continued to run the circuit very successfully until 1962 when ownership passed to Grovewood Securities in July, the previous owner remaining in a consultancy capacity until the end of September. Before this, on 11 June 1962 Mallory Park saw it first non-championship Formula One (International 2000 Guineas) race, won by John Surtees aboard a Lola Mk4 from the privately entered Lotuses of Jack Brabham and Graham Hill. Surtees was now a major race winner at Mallory on both 2 and 4 wheels.

Over the next two years, a considerable amount of money was spent on Mallory with the building of new spectator stands and a new commentators’ press and timekeepers’ boxes. Further developments took place raising the standard of the track. Crowds grew and in 1962, over 50,000 people paid to see the Post TT International Motor Cycle meeting, when Mike Hailwood won, improving the lap record to 91.70 mph. This led to its Race of the Year and Sidecar race of the Year being sponsored by the Daily Mail. Under the control of Grovewood Securities, Mallory enjoyed its golden days in the 1960s and 1970s with some of the greatest names in motorsport competing there. Amongst these, a young Austrian who arrived for the Whit Sunday meeting in 1964, for his first race in England in a new Formula Two Brabham – Jochen Rindt. He asked Denny Hulme if he could follow him round to learn the circuit and then proceeded to set fastest time in qualifying; despite being delayed in the race, he finished third behind the reigning World Champion, Jim Clark and his experienced team-mate Peter Arundell.

=== 1970s ===
Throughout the Sixties and Seventies, the circuit hosted almost every major British car and bike championship. However, on occasions there were European Championship events. For example, 12 March 1972, saw FIA European Formula Two Championship, with Dave Morgan winning in his Reeves Racing Brabham-Ford BT35, from the future Ferrari pairing of Niki Lauda and Carlos Reutemann.

1970 saw Mallory used as a venue for cycle racing with the World road race championships being run on a road course starting and finishing at Mallory and incorporating the circuit (reversed) each lap. The professional event was won by ill-fated Belgian Jean-Pierre Monseré.

Formula Two returned again 1973, this time Morgan could only finish third. The victor was Frenchman, Jean-Pierre Jarier in his works March-BMW 732. Second was Dave McConnell.

After a little over 20 years, the owners of Mallory Park offered the estate for sale; no doubt the expense of bringing Brands Hatch (which Grovewood also owned) up to current Grand Prix standards had some effort on the decision and the re-opening of Donington Park, which was only some 20 miles away, may have influenced the decision. Mallory was once more on the market but, reportedly with a restriction in its future use for motor sport on its future use for motor racing, although planning permission had been obtained for the erection of 30 dwelling on the estate.

Meanwhile, famously the Bay City Rollers tartan army played a concert during a BBC-organised 'Fun Day' on 18 May 1975, on a stage specifically constructed in the middle of the lake.

=== 1980s and onwards ===
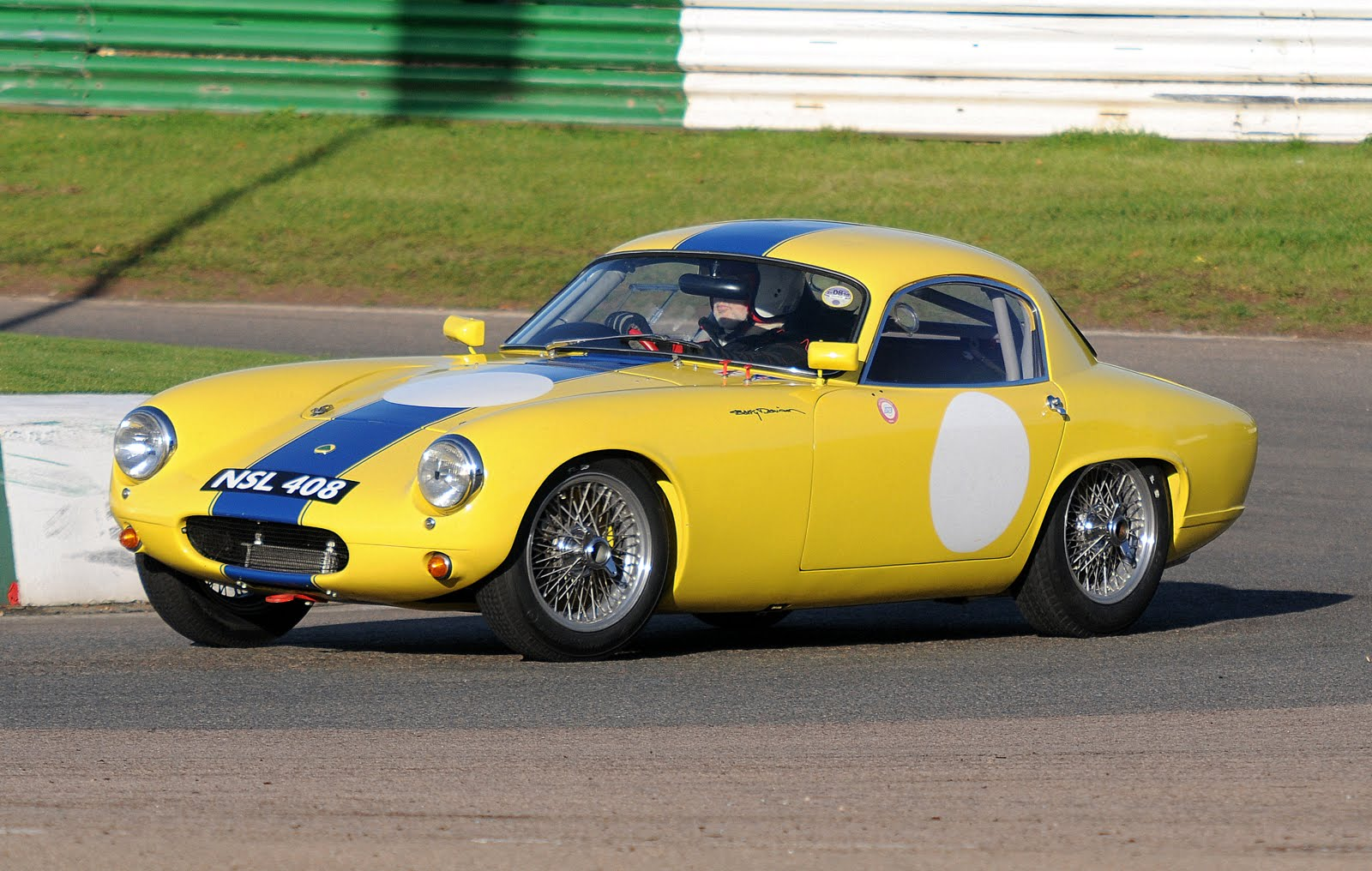
A Lotus Elite cornering on a hairpin in November 2009.

Edwina Overend was the competitions secretary of the Midlands Centre of the British Racing and Sports Car Club (BRSCC); during the close of the 1982 season, the expected cessation of racing at Mallory loomed large and various time wasters had come and gone, Overend approached Chris Meek with a view to his purchasing the estate. Meek was a well-known racing driver and businessman who effected the purchase late in 1982, and reopened the circuit on 29 May 1983, the first race of the new era being organised by the 750 Motor Club.

In late 1983, the reported owners – Motor Circuit Developments (MCD) announced that the circuit would close due to restriction of usage – being limited to race-days only – meant the circuit was not viable without alternative-use of the track for practice days.

There was no interruption to the programme and Mallory went from strength to strength, apart from a hiccup from in December 1985 when the local borough council served a Noise Nuisance Order which restricted use of the circuit to 40 days a year. On Sundays there is an absolute curfew and no racing engines must be run after 6 pm.

In late 1987, Edwina and Ron Overend trading as Mallory Park (Motorsport) Ltd., negotiated a long term lease with Chris Meek's Titan Properties to ensure the future of racing at Mallory.

Mallory Park has hosted all major motor racing formulae to be contested in post-war England – European Formula Two Championship, British Formula One Championship, Group 7 sport cars, European Formula 5000, British Formula Three Championship and British Saloon Car Championship. In the 1981 programme the name of Damon Hill appears as one of the ‘Ams’ in the Yamaha RD350 Pro-Am series.

The British Superbike Championship was last hosted at Mallory for the 2010 season, where it was used since 1995 (with the exception of 2003).

Annually in October, The Festival of Sidecars takes place. No solo machines compete, but sidecars of all categories are entered, including three-wheelers such as those made by the Morgan Motor Company.

From the mid-1990s, the BRSCC promoted EuroCars, V6 and V8 saloon-outline cars which had graduated from the stock car circuits. At Mallory Park, they ran anticlockwise on the oval circuit.

== Records ==
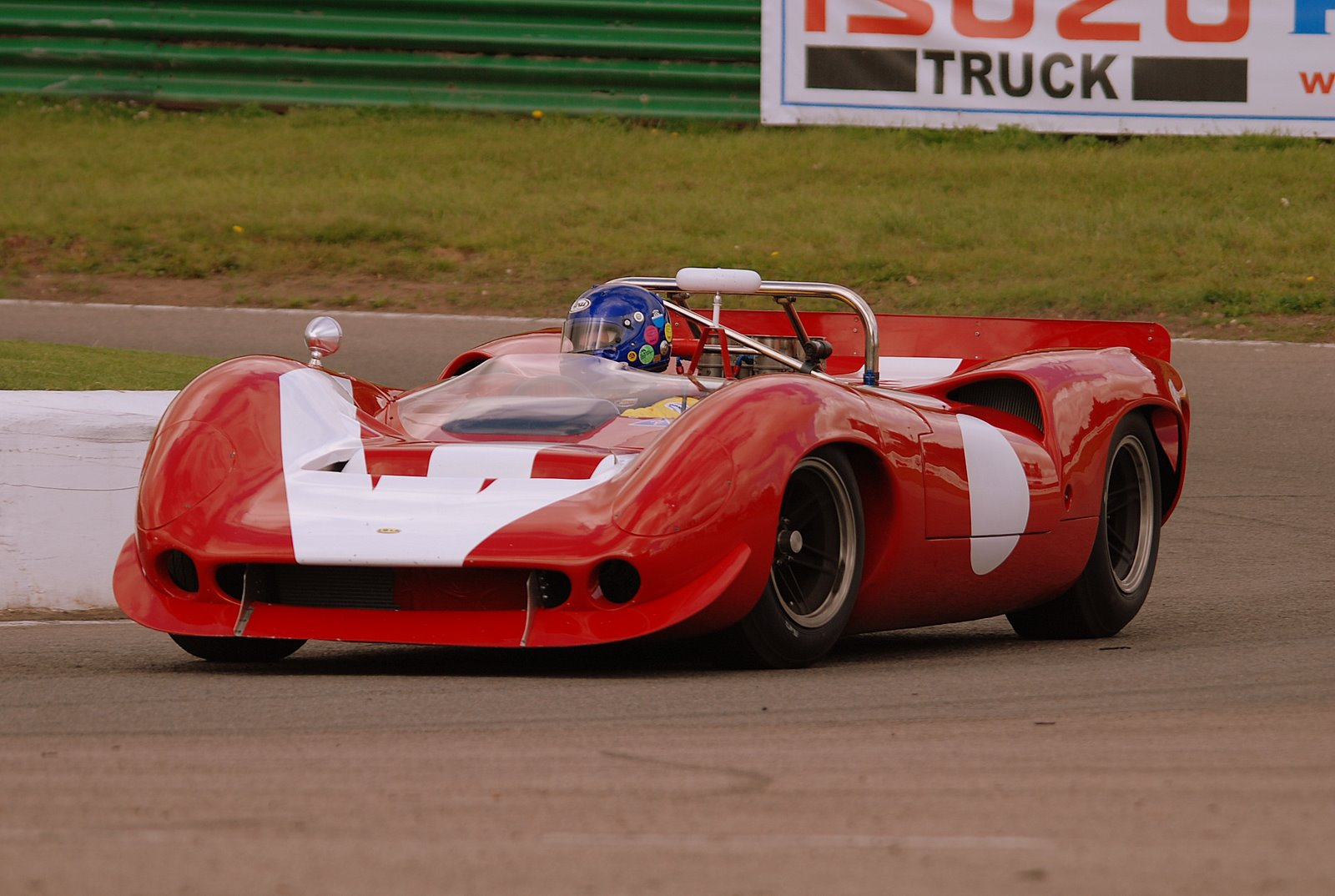
A Lola T70 Spyder sports car, on test at Mallory Park, October 2007

The history of the 100 mph (160 km/h) lap at the Leicestershire circuit is interesting; the first one was a long time coming, for it was not until 1966 that it finally happened when on 29 May, Denny Hulme took a Lola T70 round in 47.6sec at a speed of 102.10 mph (164.31 km/h). Two years later, Roy Pike established the first Formula Three 100 mph (160 km/h) lap in a Titan, which he took round in 48sec (101.25 mph (162.95 km/h)). The lap record fell again to John E Miles in 1964 who drove a Turner Cosworth Mk2 VUD 701, winning the British Championship outright, beating the mighty AC Cobra's. With coming of the large capacity single-seater like the Formula 5000 and Formula One cars, the outright record continue to fall until, in 1979, Ricardo Zunino took an Arrows A1 round in 40.065sec at an incredible 121.32 mph (195.25 km/h). 22 years after the 100 mph (160 km/h) late, Vincenzo Sospiri established the first such lap in a Formula Ford when he drove a Van Diemen RF88 at 100.41 mph (161.59 km/h) in 48.44sec.

By the end of the 20th Century, the outright lap record on the full circuit, which still stands to the credit of Johan Rajamäki, driving a Formula One Footwork-Judd FA13 in the BOSS Formula at 127.12 mph (204.58 km/h) in 0:38.230. it was set on 5 May 1997.

On the oval circuit, the record has stood since May 1995, the credit of a V6 Ford Mondeo Eurocar of Ian Fewings at 106.51 mph (171.41 km/h) in 0:33.840.

While on two wheels, the full lap record was set during the 2017 ‘Race of the year’ at 0:50.660, at 97.86 mph (157.49 km/h), by Bradley Ray abroad a Suzuki GSX-R1000.

In the karting world John Riley in his Division 1 Superkart set the lap record of 0:44.071, at 110.30 mph (177.51 km/h) in June 2006. At this point he was already the lap record holder in the Formula 250 National Superkart class with a laptime of 0:45.141, at 107.66 mph (173.26 km/h) set in August 2001.

=== Lap records ===
As of October 2017, the fastest official race lap records at the Mallory Park are listed as:

Category	Time	Driver	Vehicle	Event
Oval (1956–present): 1.000 mi (1.609 km)
Super Touring	0:33.840	Ian Fewings	Ford Mondeo	1995 Mallory Park Eurocar round
Car Circuit (1956–present): 1.350 mi (2.173 km)
British Sprint Championship	0:37.920	Nick Algar	Gould GR55	2009 Mallory Park British Sprint round
Formula One	0:38.230	Johan Rajamäki	Footwork FA13	1997 Mallory Park BOSS Formula round
F5000	0:41.400	Ian Ashley (Note: Both drivers took the same lap time independently on different years.); Bob Evans	Lola T330; Lola T400	1974 3rd Mallory Park F5000 round 1975 2nd Mallory Park F5000 round
Formula Three	0:42.790	Raul Boesel	Ralt RT3	1981 Mallory Park British F3 round
Formula Two	0:43.000	Ronnie Peterson	March 722	1972 Mallory Park European F2 round
Division 1 Superkart	0:44.071	John Riley	Division 1 Superkart	2006 Malory Park BSC round
250cc Superkart	0:45.151	John Riley	250cc Superkart	2001 Malory Park BSC round
Group 7	0:47.650	Denny Hulme	Lola T70 Mk.II	1966 Grovewood Trophy
Group 4	0:47.800	Frank Gardner	Lola T70 Mk.III GT	1968 Guards Trophy
Formula Ford	0:48.400	Vincenzo Sospiri	Van Diemen RF88	1988 Mallory Park British Formula Ford round
Group 1	0:50.830	Jeff Allam (Note: Both drivers took the same lap time independently in the same race.); Vince Woodman	Rover 3500 S Ford Capri III 3.0S	1982 Mallory Park BSCC round
Superbike Circuit (2006–present): 1.410 mi (2.269 km)
BSB	0:55.845	Ryuichi Kiyonari	Honda CBR1000RR	2007 Mallory Park BSB round
Motorcycle Short Circuit (2003–present): 1.390 mi (2.237 km)
Superbike	0:50.660	Bradley Ray	Suzuki GSX-R1000	2017 Mallory Park Race of the Year
BSB	0:51.931	Ryuichi Kiyonari	Honda CBR1000RR	2004 Mallory Park BSB round

== Other uses ==
=== Motocross circuit ===
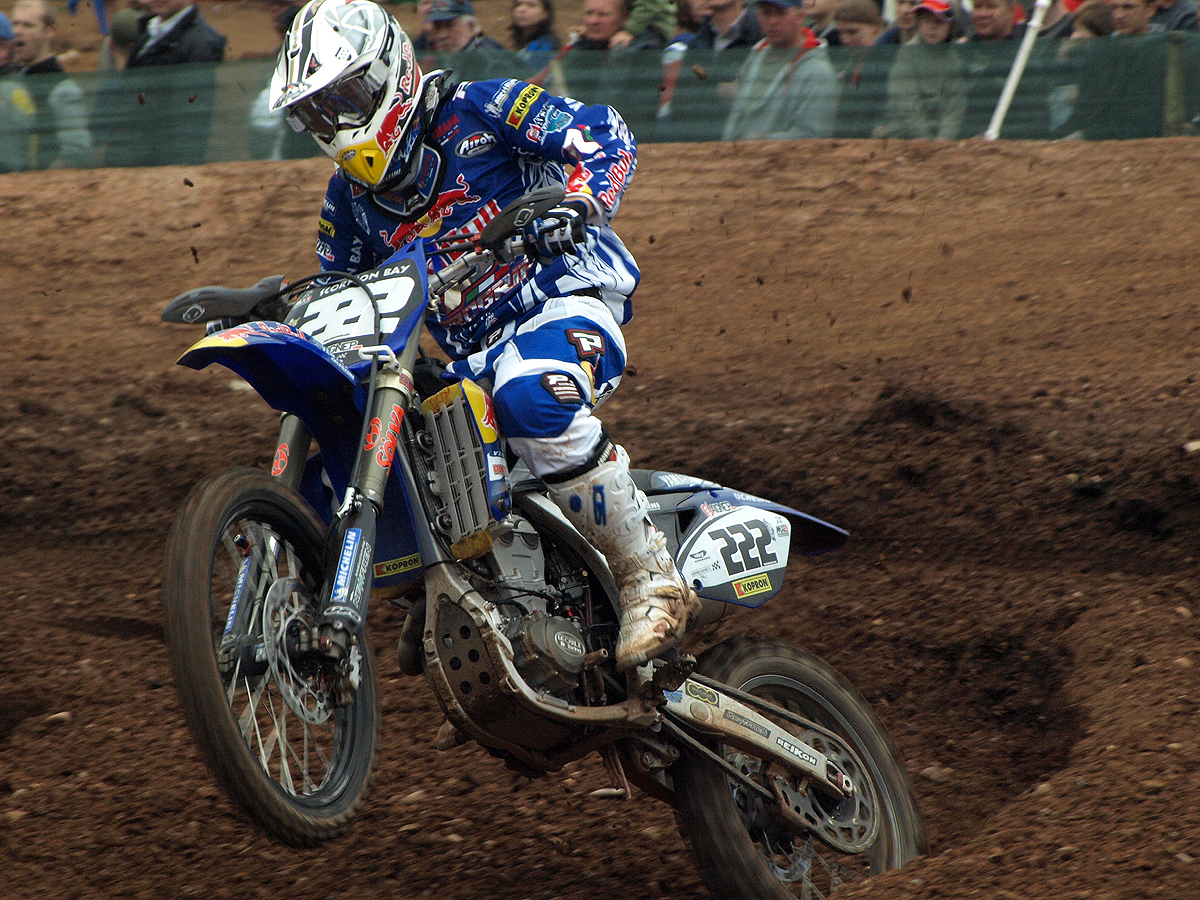
Antonio Cairoli, riding a FMI Yamaha YZ450F, winning the FIM MX2 round at Mallory Park 2008

Adjacent to the road course is a purpose-built motocross circuit which played host to the Grand Prix of Great Britain in 2008. The event was being organised by off-road promotions company RHL, who originally planned to use the former Grand Prix circuit at Foxhill, near Swindon, until it became apparent that the infrastructure at the Wiltshire venue would not be sufficient for such a high-profile event.

The event was seen as a success by fans, with over 30,000 fans in attendance over the weekend. However, the Grand Prix only returned once more in 2009.

The circuit has been unused since late 2013 and has fallen into disuse. Motocross activities ended due to noise concerns and, in the interests of improving relations with the local community, the new owners of the circuit have no plans to recommence Motocross.

=== Cycling ===
The park is used as a venue for Triathlon training, with the tarmac circuit offering traffic-free conditions for endurance training in cycling and distance-running. The lake enables open water swimming. Occasionally, family cycling fun-events are held.

== Major race results ==
=== British Grasstrack Championship ===
Year	Class	Winners	Runner-up	3rd place
1951	500cc	ENG Dick Tolley	ENG Fred Wallis	ENG Albert Hull
	350cc	ENG Syd Mintey	ENG Syd Mintey	ENG Nammon Baldwin
	Right-hand Sidecars	ENG Cyril Smith & Wilf Wilstead	ENG Bill Boddice & Bill Storr	ENG W. Mares & ANOther
1953	500cc	ENG Austin Cresswell	ENG Len Bayliss	ENG Alf Hagon
	350cc	ENG Syd Mintey	ENG Fred Wallis	ENG Alf Hagon
	Right-hand Sidecars	ENG Derek Yorke & George Mason	ENG E. Davis & ANOther	ENG Charlie Freeman & J. Cheisnell
1954	500cc	ENG Alf Hagon	ENG Syd Mintey	ENG Martin Tatum
	350cc	ENG Alf Hagon	ENG Syd Mintey	ENG Martin Tatum
	Right-hand Sidecars	ENG Bill Evans & Ron Jones	ENG Brian Stonebridge & ANOther	ENG H. Carter & ANOther

- Note: Bill who finished second in the 1951 Sidecars went on to complete many laps around Mallory in Road Racing. He is the father of Mick Boddice, the record breaking Isle of Man TT competitor.

=== Formula One Non-World Championship races ===
Year	Race	Driver	Constructor
1962	International 2000 Guineas	(England) John Surtees	Lola- Climax Mk4
1978	1978 Sun Trophy	(England) Geoff Lees	Ensign-Cosworth N175
	1978 Dave Lee Travis Trophy	(Australia) Bruce Allison	March-Cosworth 781
1979	1979 Sun Trophy	(England) Rupert Keegan	Arrows-Cosworth A1
	1979 ATV Trophy	(Republic of Ireland) David Kennedy	Wolf-Cosworth WR6
1980	1980 Sun Trophy	(Spain) Emilio de Villota	Williams-Cosworth FW07
	1980 ATV Trophy	(Spain) Emilio de Villota	Williams-Cosworth FW07

=== International Formula Two Championship ===
Year	Race	Driver	Car
1959	Nottingham S.C.C. Formula 2 Race	(England) Tim Parnell	Cooper-Climax T45
	VIII B.R.S.C.C. Formula 2 Race	(England) Tim Parnell	Cooper-Climax T45
1964	Grovewood Trophy	(Scotland) Jim Clark	Lotus-Cosworth 32
1967	Guards International Trophy	(England) John Surtees	Lola-Cosworth T100
1971	Speed International Trophy	(France) Henri Pescarolo	March-Cosworth 712M
1972	European Formula Two Championship Rd.1	(England) Dave Morgan	Brabham-Ford BT35
1973	European Formula Two Championship Rd.1	(France) Jean-Pierre Jarier	March-BMW 732

=== European Formula 5000 Championship ===
The BRSCC's European Formula 5000 Championship, organised in the UK but taking in events across Europe, was first contested in 1969. The title sponsorship moved from Guards to Rothmans to Shellsport before the series let in F1, F2 and F. Atlantic cars for 1976.

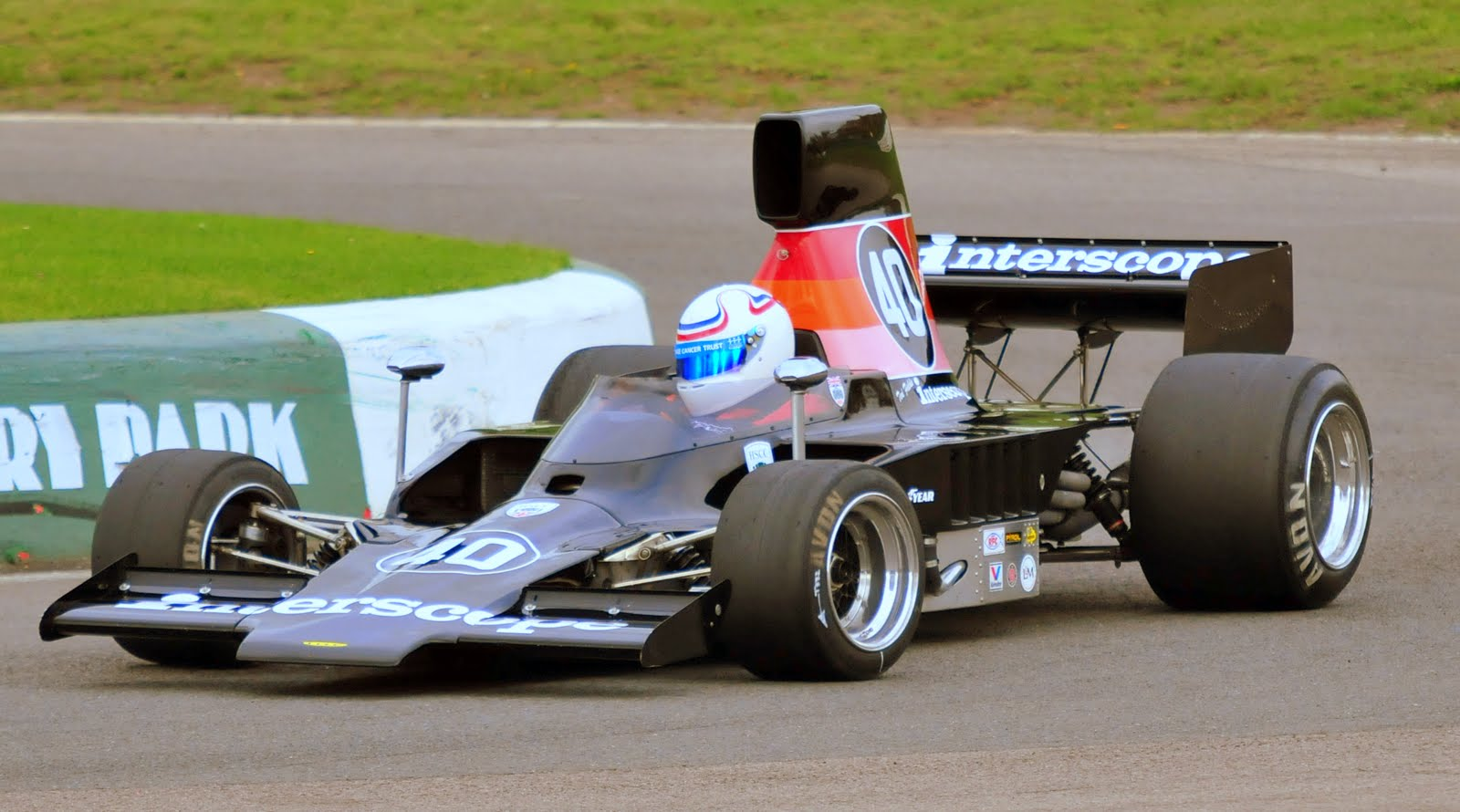
The Interscope-liveried Lola T332 Formula 5000 car rounds the hairpin at Mallory Park, October 2009.

Year	Race	Driver	Car
1969	Guards Formula 5000 Championship Rd.4	(England) Peter Gethin	McLaren-Chevrolet M10A
1970	Guards European Formula 5000 Championship Rd.8	(England) Peter Gethin	McLaren-Chevrolet M10B
1971	Rothmans European Formula 5000 Championship Rd.1	(England) Mike Hailwood	Surtees-Chevrolet TS8
	Rothmans European Formula 5000 Championship Rd.7	(New Zealand) Graham McRae	McLaren-Chevrolet M10B
	Rothmans European Formula 5000 Championship Rd.9	(England) Mike Hailwood	Surtees-Chevrolet TS8
1972	Rothmans European Formula 5000 Championship Rd.2	(England) Alan Rollinson	Lola-Chevrolet T300
	Rothmans European Formula 5000 Championship Rd.9	(England) Steve Thompson	Surtees-Chevrolet TS8
1973	Rothmans European Formula 5000 Championship Rd.2	(New Zealand) Graham McRae	McRae-Chevrolet GM1
	Rothmans European Formula 5000 Championship Rd.7	(England) Keith Holland	Trojan-Chevrolet T101
	Rothmans European Formula 5000 Championship Rd.10	(United States) Brett Lunger	Trojan-Chevrolet T101
1974	Rothmans European Formula 5000 Championship Rd.2	(England) David Hobbs	Lola-Chevrolet T330
	Rothmans European Formula 5000 Championship Rd.11	(England) Bob Evans	Lola-Chevrolet T332
	Rothmans European Formula 5000 Championship Rd.17	(England) Guy Edwards	Lola-Chevrolet T332
1975	Shellsport European Formula 5000 Championship Rd.9	(Belgium) Teddy Pilette	Lola-Chevrolet T400
	Shellsport European Formula 5000 Championship Rd.15	(Belgium) Teddy Pilette	Lola-Chevrolet T400

=== British Formula Three ===
Year	Race	Driver	Car
1964	Express & Star British Championship, Rd.1	(England) John Taylor	Cooper-BMC T72
	BRSCC Championship, Rd.1	(England) Rodney Bloor	Brabham-Ford BT9
	Express & Star British Championship, Rd.7	(Scotland) Jackie Stewart	Cooper-BMC T72
	XII B.A.R.C. Members' Meeting	(England) Roger Mac	Brabham-Ford Holbay BT6
	BRSCC Championship, Rd.9	(England) Chris Irwin	Merlyn-Ford Holbay Mk7
	Express & Star British Championship, Rd.10	(England) Roger Mac	Brabham-Ford Holbay BT6
	Bob Gerard Trophy	(England) Derek Bell	Lotus -BMC 22
1965	BARC Midlands Trophy	(England) Charles Crichton-Stuart	Brabham-Ford Cosworth BT10
	Coventry Cup	(England) Tony Dean	Brabham-Ford Cosworth BT15
	Nottingham Trophy	(England) Tony Dean	Brabham-Ford Cosworth BT15
1966	Les Leston Championship, Rd. 2	(England) Harry Stiller	Brabham-Ford Cosworth BT16
	Les Leston Championship, Rd. 4	(England) Chris Lambert	Brabham-Ford Cosworth BT15
	Les Leston Championship, Rd. 7	(England) Morris Nunn	Lotus-Ford Cosworth 41
	Les Leston Championship, Rd.10	(England) Jackie Oliver	Lotus-Ford Cosworth 41
	Lakeside Trophy	(England) Mike Walker	Brabham-Ford Cosworth BT18
	Les Leston Championship, Rd.15	(England) Peter Gethin	Brabham-Ford Cosworth BT18
1967	Les Leston Championship, Rd. 4	(England) Alan Rollinson	Brabham-Ford Holbay BT21
	Nottingham Trophy	(England) Morris Nunn	Lotus-Ford Holbay 41
	Les Leston Championship, Rd. 15	(England) Peter Gaydon	Brabham-Ford Cosworth-Holbay BT18
	Les Leston Championship, Rd. 21	(England) Harry Stiller	Brabham-Ford Cosworth BT21
	Les Leston Championship, Rd. 23	(England) Peter Gaydon	Brabham-Ford Cosworth-Holbay BT18
1968	Pitstop Trophy	(England) Mike Keens	Brabham-Ford Lucas BT21
	Lombank Championship, Rd.7	(Northern Ireland) Cyd Williams	Brabham-Ford Lucas BT21
	Nottingham Trophy	(Japan) Tetsu Ikuzawa	Brabham-Ford Felday BT21B
	Total Cup	(Northern Ireland) Cyd Williams	Brabham-Ford Lucas BT21
	Lombank Championship, Rd.19	(Japan) Tetsu Ikuzawa	Brabham-Ford Holbay BT21B
1969	Lombank Championship, Rd.1	(England) Alan Rollinson	Brabham-Ford Holbay BT21B
	Easter Trophy	(England) Alan Rollinson	Brabham-Ford Holbay BT21B
	Lombank Championship, Rd.7	(England) Alan Rollinson	Brabham-Ford Holbay BT21B
	Guards 4,000 Guineas	(Japan) Tetsu Ikuzawa	Lotus-Ford Holbay 59
	Lombank Championship, Rd.10	(United States) Roy Pike	Lotus-Ford Holbay 59
	Lombank Championship, Rd.12	(Brazil) Emerson Fittipaldi	Lotus-Ford Holbay 59
	Lombank Championship, Rd.15	(Brazil) Emerson Fittipaldi	Lotus-Ford Holbay 59
	Lombank Championship, Rd.16	(England) Barrie Maskell	Chevron-Ford Holbay B15
1970	Lombank Championship, Rd.2	(Australia) Dave Walker	Lotus-Ford Holbay 59
	Lombank Championship, Rd.7	(England) Bev Bond	Lotus-Ford Holbay 59A
	Lombank Championship, Rd.11	(Australia) Dave Walker	Lotus-Ford Holbay 59A
1971	North Central Lombank British F3 Championship, Rd.1	(England) Roger Williamson	March-Ford Vegantune69
	MotorSport Shell Super Oil British Formula 3 Championship, Rd.3	(England) Bev Bond	Ensign-Ford Holbay LNF1
	North Central Lombard Championship, Rd.9	(England) Steve Thompson	Ensign-Ford Holbay LNF1
	MotorSport Shell Super Oil British Formula 3 Championship, Rd.14	(Australia) Dave Walker	Lotus-Ford Holbay 69
	North Central Lombard Championship, Rd.13	(South Africa) Jody Scheckter	Merlyn-Ford Holbay Mk21
1972	Forward Trust British F3 Championship, Rd.1	(England) Barrie Maskell	Lotus-Ford Holbay 69
	Shell Super Oil British F3 Championship, Rd.3	(England) Tony Trimmer	Lotus-Ford Novamotor 73
	Shell Super Oil British F3 Championship, Rd.7	(England) Colin Vandervell	Ensign-Ford Vegantune LNF3
	North Central Lombard Championship, Rd.8	(England) Roger Williamson	GRD-Ford Holbay 372
	Shell Super Oil British F3 Championship, Rd.12	(England) Tony Brise	GRD-Ford Holbay 372
1973	John Player British F3 Championship, Rd.3	(Australia) Alan Jones	GRD-Ford Vegantune 373
	Forward Trust British F3 Championship, Rd.3	(England) Ian Taylor	March-Ford Holbay 733
	North Central Lombard British F3 Championship, Rd.7	(England) Brian Henton	GRD-Ford Holbay 373
	North Central Lombard British F3 Championship, Rd.9	(England) Tony Brise	March-Ford Holbay 733
	John Player British F3 Championship, Rd.13	(England) Mike Wilds	March-Ford Holbay 733
1974	Lombard North Central British F3 Championship, Rd.4	(United States) Tony Rouff	GRD-Ford Vegantune 373
	Lombard North Central British F3 Championship, Rd.10	(United States) Tony Rouff	GRD-Ford Vegantune 373
1976	Hollies Trophy	(New Zealand) Richard Hawkins	Ehrlich-Toyota Vegantune ES5/6
	BP Super Visco British Formula 3 Championship, Rd.9	(England) Rupert Keegan	Chevron-Toyota Novamotor B34
	Griffin Golden Helmet Trophy	(England) Stephen South	March-Toyota Novamotor 763
1977	B.R.S.C.C. Trophy	(England) Stephen South	March-Toyota Novamotor 763
	BP Super Visco British Formula 3 Championship, Rd.14	(Republic of Ireland) Derek Daly	Chevron-Toyota Novamotor B38
1978	BP British Formula 3 Championship, Rd.7	(Brazil) Nelson Piquet	Ralt-Toyota Novamotor RT1
	Vandervell British Formula 3 Championship, Rd.5	(England) Derek Warwick	Ralt-Toyota Novamotor RT1
	BP British Formula 3 Championship, Rd.16	(New Zealand) Rob Wilson	Ralt-Toyota Novamotor RT1
1979	Vandervell British Formula 3 Championship, Rd.15	(Brazil) Chico Serra	March-Toyota Novamotor 793
1980	Vandervell British Formula 3 Championship, Rd.17	(Sweden) Stefan Johansson	Ralt-Toyota Novamotor RT3
1981	Marlboro British Formula 3 Championship, Rd.4	(England) Jonathan Palmer	Ralt-Toyota Mader RT3/81
	Marlboro British Formula 3 Championship, Rd.14	(Brazil) Roberto Moreno	Ralt-Toyota Novamotor RT3/81
1982	Marlboro British Formula 3 Championship, Rd.5	(Republic of Ireland) Tommy Byrne	Ralt-Toyota Hesketh RT3C/81
	Marlboro British Formula 3 Championship, Rd.12	(Argentina) Enrique Mansilla	Ralt-Toyota Novamotor RT3D/82

=== British Touring Car Championship ===
Year	Race		Driver	Car
1958	BRSCC British Saloon Car Championship, Rd.3	Class A	(England) John Sprinzel	Austin A35
		Classes B, C & D	(England) Gawaine Baillie	Jaguar 3.4 Litre
1960	Supa Tura British Saloon Car Championship, Rd.3	1000cc only	(England) Doc Shepherd	Austin A40 Farina
1963	non-championship race	Class A	(Northern Ireland) Paddy Hopkirk	Mini Cooper S
1967	British Saloon Car Championship, Rd.5	Classes A & B	(England) John Rhodes	Mini Cooper S
		Classes C & D	(Australia) Frank Gardner	Ford Falcon Sprint
1968	British Saloon Car Championship, Rd.5	Classes A & B	(England) John Fitzpatrick	Ford Escort 1300 GT
		Classes C & D	(Australia) Brian Muir	Ford Falcon Sprint
1969	British Saloon Car Championship, Rd.7	Classes A & B	(England) Gordon Spice	Morris Mini Cooper S
		Classes C & D	(England) Rod Mansfield	Ford Escort Twin Cam
1971	non-championship race		(Scotland) Graham Birrell	Ford Escort Twin Cam
	British Saloon Car Championship, Rd.11	Classes C & D	(Australia) Brian Muir	Chevrolet Camaro Z28
		Classes A & B	(England) Jon Mowatt	Mini Cooper S
1972	British Saloon Car Championship, Rd.9	Classes A & B	(England) Jonathan Buncombe	BMC Mini Cooper S
		Classes C & D	(Australia) Brian Muir	Ford Capri RS2600
1974	Castrol Anniversary British Saloon Car Championship, Rd.1	Classes A & B	(England) Andy Rouse	Triumph Dolomite Sprint
		Classes C & D	(England) Stuart Graham	Chevrolet Camaro Z28 Mk2
1975	British Saloon Car Championship, Rd.1	Classes A & B	(England) Andy Rouse	Triumph Dolomite Sprint
		Classes C & D	(England) Richard Lloyd	Chevrolet Camaro Z28 Mk2
	British Saloon Car Championship, Rd.9	Classes A & B	(England) Andy Rouse	Triumph Dolomite Sprint
		Classes C & D	(England) Stuart Graham	Chevrolet Camaro Z28 MK2
1976	British Saloon Car Championship, Rd.8	Classes A & B	(England) Win Percy	Toyota Celica GT
		Classes C & D	(Scotland) Tom Walkinshaw	Ford Capri II 3.0
1978	Tricentrol British Saloon Car Championship, Rd. 7	Classes A & B	(England) Richard Lloyd	Volkswagen Golf GTI
		Classes C & D	(England) Gordon Spice	Ford Capri III 3.0S
1979	British Saloon Car Championship, Rd. 7	Classes A & B	(England) Win Percy	Toyota Celica GT
		Classes C & D	(England) Colin Vandervell	Ford Capri III 3.0S
1980	Tricentrol British Saloon Car Championship, Rd. 1	Classes A & B	(England) John Morris	Volkswagen Scirocco GTI
		Classes C & D	(England) Andy Rouse	Ford Capri III 3.0S
	Tricentrol British Saloon Car Championship, Rd. 7	Classes A & B	(England) Tony Lanfranchi	Audi 80 GLE
		Classes C & D	(England) Gordon Spice	Ford Capri III 3.0S
1981	Tricentrol British Saloon Car Championship, Rd. 1	Classes A & B	(England) John Morris	Volkswagen Golf GTI
		Classes C & D	(England) Andy Rouse	Ford Capri III 3.0S
1982	Tricentrol RAC British Saloon Car Championship, Rd. 2	Classes A & B	(England) Jeff Allam	Rover 3500 S
		Classes C & D	(England) Win Percy	Toyota Corolla GT

=== British Superbike Championship ===
Year	Race	Rider	Manufacturer
1987	1987 ACU Shell Oils Superbike Championship Rd.5	(England) Mark Phillips	500cc Suzuki
1988	1988 ACU Shell Oils TT F1 British Championship Rd.5	(England) Darren Dixon	500cc Suzuki RG500
	1988 ACU Shell Oils TT F1 British Championship Rd.7	(England) Trevor Nation	600cc Norton RCW 588
1989	1989 Shell Oils ACU Supercup, Superbikes Rd.4	(Scotland) Brian Morrison	750cc Honda RC30
	1989 Shell Oils ACU Supercup, 750cc TT Formula 1 Rd.4	(England) Terry Rymer	750cc Yamaha 0W01
1990	1990 Shell Supercup/ACU British Championship, 750cc TT F1 Rd.8	(England) Terry Rymer	750cc Yamaha 0W01
1991	1991 Shell Supercup/ACU British Championship, 750cc TT F1 Rd.11	(England) Jamie Whitham	750cc Suzuki GSX-R750
	1991 Shell Supercup/ACU British Championship, 750cc TT F1 Rd.12	(England) Jamie Whitham	750cc Suzuki GSX-R750
1992	1992 Motor Cycle News Supercup/ACU British Championship, 750cc Rd.3	(England) John Reynolds	750cc Kawasaki ZXR750R
	1992 Motor Cycle News Supercup/ACU British Championship, 750cc Rd.4	(England) John Reynolds	750cc Kawasaki ZXR750R
	1992 Motor Cycle News TT Superbike Challenge Rd.9	(England) John Reynolds	750cc Kawasaki ZXR750R
	1992 Motor Cycle News TT Superbike Challenge Rd.10	(England) John Reynolds	750cc Kawasaki ZXR750R
	1992 Motor Cycle News Supercup/ACU British Championship, 750cc Challenge Rd.19	(England) John Reynolds	750cc Kawasaki ZXR750R
	1992 Motor Cycle News Supercup/ACU British Championship, 750cc Challenge Rd.20	(England) John Reynolds	750cc Kawasaki ZXR750R
1993	1993 ACU TT Superbike British Championship Rd.3	(England) Jamie Whitham	750cc Yamaha
	1993 ACU TT Superbike British Championship Rd.4	(England) Jamie Whitham	750cc Yamaha
	1993 HEAT TT Superbike Supercup Rd.11	(Scotland) Jim Moodie	588cc Norton RFI 588
	1993 HEAT TT Superbike Supercup Rd.12	(Scotland) Jim Moodie	588cc Norton RFI 588
1994	1994 HEAT TT Superbike Supercup Rd.3	(Northern Ireland) Mark Farmer	750cc Yamaha
	1994 HEAT TT Superbike Supercup Rd.4	(Northern Ireland) Mark Farmer	750cc Yamaha
1995	1995 British Superbike Supercup Rd.3	(England) Jamie Whitham	916cc Ducati 916
	1995 British Superbike Supercup Rd.4	(England) Jamie Whitham	916cc Ducati 916
1996	1996 British Superbike Championship Rd.15	(England) Jamie Whitham	750cc Yamaha YZF750
	1996 British Superbike Championship Rd.16	(England) Jamie Whitham	750cc Yamaha YZF750
1997	1997 British Superbike Championship Rd.13	(Scotland) Niall Mackenzie	750cc Yamaha YZF750
	1997 British Superbike Championship Rd.14	(Scotland) Niall Mackenzie	750cc Yamaha YZF750
	1997 British Superbike Championship Rd.15	(Scotland) Iain MacPherson	750cc Kawasaki ZX-7RR
	1997 British Superbike Championship Rd.16	(Scotland) Niall Mackenzie	750cc Yamaha YZF750
1998	1998 British Superbike Championship Rd.15	(England) Matt Llewellyn	916cc Ducati 916
	1998 British Superbike Championship Rd.16	(England) Chris Walker	750cc Kawasaki ZX-7RR
1999	1999 British Superbike Championship Rd.17	(England) James Haydon	750cc Suzuki GSX-R750
	1999 British Superbike Championship Rd.18	(England) John Reynolds	996cc Ducati 996
2000	2000 British Superbike Championship Rd.19	(England) Neil Hodgson	996cc Ducati 996
	2000 British Superbike Championship Rd.20	(England) Chris Walker	750cc Suzuki GSX-R750
2001	2001 British Superbike Championship Rd.21	(England) John Reynolds	996cc Ducati 996 RS
	2001 British Superbike Championship Rd.22	(Scotland) Steve Hislop	996cc Ducati 996 RS
2002	2002 British Superbike Championship Rd.23	(England) Steve Plater	749cc Yamaha YZF-R7
	2002 British Superbike Championship Rd.24	(England) Michael Rutter	998cc Ducati 998 RS
2004	2004 British Superbike Championship Rd.17	(England) John Reynolds	999cc Suzuki GSX-R1000
	2004 British Superbike Championship Rd.18	(England) Scott Smart	998cc Kawasaki ZX-10R
2005	2005 British Superbike Championship Rd.5	(England) Michael Rutter	999cc Honda CBR1000RR
	2005 British Superbike Championship Rd.6	(England) Michael Rutter	999cc Honda CBR1000RR
2006	2006 British Superbike Championship Rd.9	(Japan) Ryuichi Kiyonari	999cc Honda CBR1000RR
	2006 British Superbike Championship Rd.10	(Spain) Gregorio Lavilla	999cc Ducati 999 F04
2007	2007 British Superbike Championship Rd.17	(England) Shane Byrne	999cc Honda CBR1000RR
	2007 British Superbike Championship Rd.18	(Japan) Ryuichi Kiyonari	999cc Honda CBR1000RR
2008	2008 British Superbike Championship Rd.11	(England) Shane Byrne	1099cc Ducati 1098R
	2008 British Superbike Championship Rd.12	(England) Michael Rutter	1099cc Ducati 1098R
2009	2009 British Superbike Championship Rd.13	(England) James Ellison	999cc Yamaha YZF-R1
	2009 British Superbike Championship Rd.14	(England) Leon Camier	999cc Yamaha YZF-R1
2010	2010 British Superbike Championship Rd.9	(Japan) Ryuichi Kiyonari	999cc Honda CBR1000RR
	2010 British Superbike Championship Rd.10	(Japan) Ryuichi Kiyonari	999cc Honda CBR1000RR

=== "Race of the Year" (Motorcycles) ===
Year	Race	Rider	Manufacturer
1958	Race of the Year	(England) John Surtees	500cc MV Agusta
1959	Race of the Year	(Scotland) Bob McIntyre	500cc Norton
1960	Race of the Year	(England) Mike Hailwood	500cc Norton
1961	Race of the Year	(Rhodesia) Gary Hocking	500cc MV Agusta
1962	Race of the Year	(England) Derek Minter	500cc Norton
1963	Race of the Year	(England) Mike Hailwood	500cc MV Agusta
1964	Race of the Year	(England) Mike Hailwood	500cc MV Agusta
1965	Race of the Year	(England) John Cooper	500cc Norton
1966	Race of the Year	(Italy) Giacomo Agostini	500cc MV Agusta
1967	Race of the Year	(England) Mike Hailwood	297cc Honda
1968	Race of the Year	(England) Mike Hailwood	297cc Honda
1969	Race of the Year	(Italy) Giacomo Agostini	500cc MV Agusta
1970	Race of the Year	(England) John Cooper	350cc Yamsel
1971	Race of the Year	(England) John Cooper	750cc BSA
1972	Race of the Year	(Finland) Jarno Saarinen	350cc Yamaha
1973	Race of the Year	(England) Phil Read	500cc MV Agusta
1974	Race of the Year	(England) Barry Sheene	750cc Suzuki
1975	Race of the Year	(England) Barry Sheene	750cc Suzuki
1976	Race of the Year	(United States) Steve Baker	750cc Yamaha
1977	Race of the Year	(United States) Pat Hennen	653cc Suzuki
1978	Race of the Year	(England) Barry Sheene	500cc Suzuki
1979	Race of the Year	(United States) Kenny Roberts	500cc Yamaha
1980	Race of the Year	(United States) Randy Mamola	500cc Suzuki
1981	Race of the Year	(New Zealand) Graeme Crosby	500cc Suzuki
1986	Race of the Year	(England) Roger Marshall	500cc Honda
1987	Race of the Year	(England) Roger Marshall	1100cc Suzuki
1988	Race of the Year	(England) Jamie Whitham	750cc Suzuki
1989	Race of the Year	(England) Terry Rymer	750cc Yamaha
1990	Race of the Year	(England) Terry Rymer	750cc Yamaha
1991	Race of the Year	(England) Rob McElnea	750cc Yamaha
1992	Race of the Year	(England) John Reynolds	750cc Kawasaki
1994	Race of the Year	(England) Matt Llewellyn	926cc Ducati
1995	Race of the Year	(England) Chris Walker	250cc Honda
1996	Race of the Year	(England) Ray Stringer	750cc Kawasaki
1997	Race of the Year	(England) Jason Vincent	500cc Honda
1998	Race of the Year	(England) Chris Walker	750cc Kawasaki
1999	Race of the Year	(England) Jason Vincent	500cc Honda
2000	Race of the Year	(England) Steve Plater	750cc Kawasaki
2001	Race of the Year	(England) Michael Rutter	750cc Kawasaki
2002	Race of the Year	(Australia) Glen Richards	750cc Kawasaki
2003	Race of the Year	(England) Michael Rutter	998cc Ducati
2004	Race of the Year	(England) John Reynolds	1000cc Suzuki
2005	Race of the Year	(Australia) Glen Richards	1000cc Kawasaki
2006	Race of the Year	(England) Chris Walker	1000cc Suzuki
2007	Race of the Year	(England) Cal Crutchlow	1000cc Suzuki
2008	Race of the Year	(England) Tom Sykes	1000cc Suzuki
2011	Race of the Year	(England) Sam Lowes	1000cc Honda
2014	Race of the Year	(England) John Ingram	1000cc Kawasaki
2016	Race of the Year	(England) Taylor Mackenzie	1000cc BMW
2017	Race of the Year	(England) Bradley Ray	1000cc Suzuki
2018	Race of the Year	(England) Richard Cooper	1000cc Suzuki

=== FIM Motocross World Championship ===
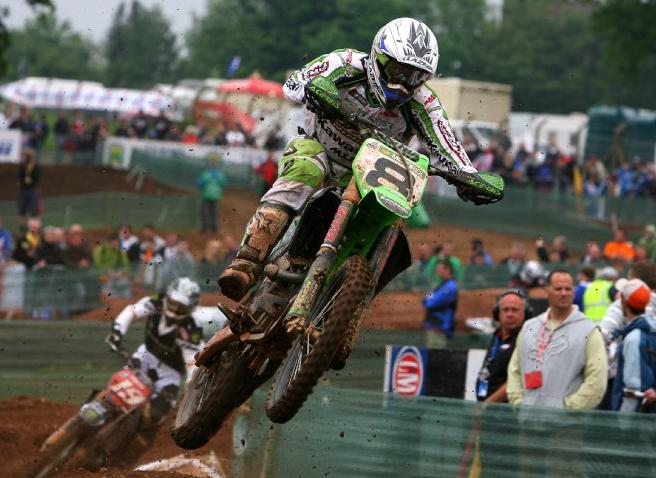
Tanel Leok in Grand Prix of Great Britain, followed by David Philippaerts

Year	Race	Rider	Manufacturer
2008	Grand Prix of Great Britain MX1	(Spain) Jonathan Barragán	KTM
	Grand Prix of Great Britain MX2	(Italy) Antonio Cairoli	Yamaha
2009	Grand Prix of Great Britain MX1	(Italy) David Philippaerts	Yamaha
	Grand Prix of Great Britain MX2	(France) Marvin Musquin	KTM
