= Suzuki GSR750 =

- 2011 GSR750 with Arrow exhaust installed
- Manufacturer: Suzuki
- Production: 2011-2016
- Successor: Suzuki GSX-S750
- Class: Standard
- Engine: 749 cc (45.7 cu in) liquid-cooled 4-stroke 16-valve DOHC inline-four
- Bore / stroke: 72.0 mm × 46.0 mm (2.83 in × 1.81 in)
- Power: 79 kW (106 hp; 107 PS) @ 10,200 rpm
- Torque: 80 N⋅m (59 lbf⋅ft) @ 9,000 rpm
- Transmission: 6-speed with multi-plate clutch
- Seat height: 815 mm (32.1 in)
- Weight: 213 kg (469.6 lb) (wet)
- Fuel capacity: 17.5 L (4.6 US gal)

The Suzuki GSR750 is a 749 cc 16-valve in-line four motorcycle that was introduced in 2011 as a middleweight street-bike built with a 2005 GSX-R750 derived engine, which has been re-tuned for a more usable midrange at the expense of high end power.

ABS was added since 2012, 2015 it has arrived in the USA and at the Intermot 2016 a newly named GSX-S750 was announced.
