= Toby Davis =

British racing driver

- Nationality: British
- Born: Hereford, Herefordshire

Volkswagen Racing Cup career
- Debut season: 2016 Volkswagen Racing Cup
- Current team: Team HARD
- Car number: 34
- Starts: 37
- Wins: 2
- Poles: 1

Previous series
- British Superkart Championship

Toby Davis is a racing driver from Great Britain, who grew up in Much Marcle, Herefordshire. Toby won a scholarship in 2016, put on by Tony Gilham, which enabled him to start his racing career.

== Karting career ==
Davis made his karting debut in 2006, entering in the club championship for Junior TKM, held at Little Rissington. A successful 2007 season saw him finish 3rd in the championship, leading to an upgrade to the F250 National gearbox kart championship in 2008. In 2009, Davis made his long circuit debut at Oulton Park, coming away with 3rd overall in his first ever event. Having finished in the top 15 in his first season in the championship, podiums would follow in 2010 and he ended up vice-champion in the F250 Challenge to his brother, Ben.

From 2011 until 2016, Davis was supported by the factory Viper Racing outfit, leading to multiple race wins and a series of top 5 championship finishes, despite continual budget issues. In 2013, he was the British MSA Superkart Grand Prix champion.

== Racing career ==
In winter 2015, Tony Gilham of Team HARD put on his 2nd scholarship competition, open to the public for anyone with little to no car racing experience. Of the 130 men and women who entered, Davis was the chosen winner, for which the prize was a fully funded drive in the UK's VW Racing Cup. In his first race weekend for Team HARD, at Rockingham, Davis took 5th place in the first race despite qualifying last due to a car gremlin, before winning only his second ever car race. A difficult race weekend at Oulton Park was followed by 2nd on the grid for Silverstone on the Grand Prix layout, despite having never driven the car in the wet before this session. Davis went on to take a podium in the rain-soaked race later in the day.

At his first visit to Spa-Francorchamps in Belgium, Davis took 5th and 9th places (despite leading at one point in race 2), before heading to Snetterton, where he took a 9th place and a DNF due to a progressively declining mechanical issue.

At Donington Park, Davis took both available pole positions, again in inclement conditions. In race 1, he narrowly missed out on the win due to a safety car interrupting a 3-second lead. In race 2, he showed his inexperience by over-correcting a slide at the Old Hairpin, collecting the tyre barriers and ending his race. In race 3, the hastily repaired car was no match for his rivals, and despite defending hard from those around him, 6th place was all he could manage.

At the final round at Brands Hatch, Davis didn't start race 1 due to a technical gremlin. Starting from the back in race 2, he came through the field with a strong opening lap to finish 5th. Starting 7th on the grid in the finale, he again came through the field to finish 3rd and take his final podium of the season.

== Racing record ==
=== Career summary ===
Season	Series	Team	Races	Wins	Poles	F/Laps	Podiums	Position
2009	British Superkart Championship	Davis Racing	7	0	0	0	0	13th
2010	British Superkart Championship	Davis Racing	6	0	0	0	2	12th
2011	British Superkart Championship	Davis Racing with Viper Racing UK	6	0	0	0	4	4th
2012	British Superkart Championship	Davis Racing with Viper Racing UK	6	1	1	2	4	3rd
2013	British Superkart Championship	Davis Racing with Viper Racing UK	6	2	0	1	3	4th
2014	British Superkart Championship	Davis Racing with Viper Racing UK	6	0	0	2	0	5th
2015	British Superkart Championship	Davis Racing with Viper Racing UK	6	0	1	1	4	3rd
2016	British Superkart Championship	Davis Racing with Viper Racing UK	6	0	0	0	3	6th
2016	British VW Racing Cup	Team HARD	15	1	1	0	4	7th
2017	British VW Racing Cup	Team HARD	8	0	0	1	0	17th
2018	British VW Racing Cup	Team HARD	14	1	0	1	5	7th
