= Suzuki GSX-S750 =

Standard motorcycle

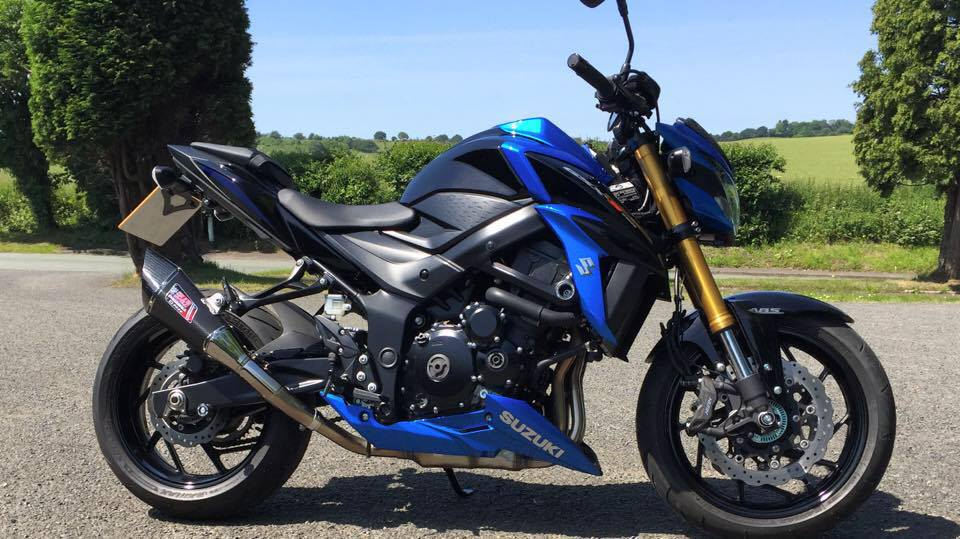
- 2017 model with aftermarket Yoshimura exhaust
- Manufacturer: Suzuki
- Production: 2015–2023
- Predecessor: GSR750
- Class: Standard motorcycle
- Engine: 749 cc (45.7 cu in) liquid-cooled 4-stroke 16-valve DOHC inline-four
- Bore / stroke: 72.0 mm × 46.0 mm (2.83 in × 1.81 in)
- Power: 84 kW (113 hp; 114 PS) @ 10,500 rpm
- Torque: 81 N⋅m (60 lbf⋅ft) @ 9,000 rpm
- Transmission: Multi-plate clutch, 6-speed, chain driven
- Suspension: Front: KYB inverted fork. Rear: Single shock w/preload adj.
- Brakes: Front: 2 310 mm disc. Rear:Single disc. ABS optional in some markets.
- Dimensions: H: 1,055 mm (41.5 in)
- Seat height: 815 mm (32.1 in)
- Weight: 211 kg (465 lb) (claimed) (wet)
- Fuel capacity: 16 L (3.5 imp gal; 4.2 US gal)
- Related: GSX-S1000, GSX-R750

The Suzuki GSX-S750 is a standard motorcycle made by Suzuki since 2015. The 749 cc (45.7 cu in), 16-valve, inline-four, sports-bike-derived engine was modified and re-tuned for more usable torque at lower RPM for commuting and cruising at slower speeds.

The GSX-S750's predecessor, the GSR750, was sold in the European markets since 2011, while Suzuki sold the same motor bike with a different body model in the USA under the GSX-S750 name in 2015 and 2016.

Comparing the GSX-S750 with the GSR750, the changes made to GSX-S750 include a new exhaust to comply with Euro 4 and California emission standards, a new tapered handlebar, new swing-arm, a revised air box, and ventilation holes in the bottom of each cylinder to reduce pumping loss and improve power. It uses a 43 tooth rear sprocket compared to the GSR's 42, to improve acceleration, and top gear was lengthened to keep the top speed the same (250 km/h +/- or 155 mph +/-).

It will be illegal to register the model in the EU, EFTA, or UK from 1 January 2023 unless it is updated to comply with Euro 5. New sales are already banned in India as it does not comply with BS VI.
