= Holbay Engineering =

British engineering company

Holbay Engineering was a small family run British engineering company specializing in engine modifications and race tuning. Although they enjoyed much success during the 1960s and 1970s with their competition race engines, they are best remembered today for their work on the Rootes 1725cc OHV engines as used in the Hillman Hunter GLS and Sunbeam Rapier H120.

== History ==
The company was founded by John Read between 1958 and 1959 together with his older brother Roger Dunnell and was initially run from the family home in Sheffield.

The company moved into larger premises at Martlesham Heath in Suffolk in 1964 and went into liquidation in 1992 after the untimely death of its founder John Read in an unusual aircraft accident.

Some of the assets of the company were sold at auction but the intellectual property rights, including the ‘Holbay’ registered trademark, company records together with all engine production details and specifications, passed to the son of the founder, Paul Dunnell, who had served his apprenticeship at the company and worked there as an engineer for some years.

Paul established his own renowned engine and race tuning business, Dunnell Engines in 1989 and absorbed the renamed Holbay Racing Engines Ltd into the Dunnell business and remains the source of knowledge and expertise for Holbay engines today.

== List of Holbay Engines ==
- Type number unknown - Holbay tuned Ford Anglia engine, a popular choice with British Formula Junior racing car constructors
- S65 - based on a Ford Cortina block and using a Holbay cylinder head.
- H120 (As supplied to the Rootes Group for their Hunter GLS and Rapier H120 Models)
