= British Superkart Championship =

Kart racing series

The British Superkart Championship is a kart racing series run in the United Kingdom under the auspices of the British Superkart Association under Motor Sports Association regulations. The karts race on full-size British circuits such as Silverstone, Donington, Brands Hatch, Pembrey, Anglesey Circuit, Bishopscourt (Northern Ireland), Castle Combe, Darley Moor, Snetterton, Croft, Cadwell Park, Thruxton and Oulton Park with the running of the MSA British Superkart Grand Prix at Donington Park which includes the British round of the European Superkart Championship.

== Classes ==
The British Superkart Championship runs two packages for four classes.

- Division 1 Superkarts is the Premier Superkart Class in European competition, featuring twin cylinder 250cc engines
- Formula 250 National the MSA British Championship class for single cylinder 250cc engines
- Formula 450 the championship class for 4 stroke engines
- Formula 125 Open uses single cylinder 125cc engines; engine tuning is allowed in this class

In 2009, the Formula 450 National was first run within British Superkart events, running on 250 chassis featuring 450cc single-cylinder four-stroke engines, primarily the KTM engine. The Division 1, MSA 250 National and 450 classes are grouped together in one package. On a number of occasions during a season, the two groups are run together in one meeting, most notably the MSA British Superkart Grand Prix and the UK Cup event, but they run separate calendars for the majority of the season.

== Champions ==
In recent years, drivers such as Gavin Bennett, Paul Platt, Toby Davis (VW Racing Cup) Nathan Freke (Ginetta works driver), Lewis Williamson (Formula Renault), James Tucker and Jake Green (Formula Ford) have all raced and won championships in Superkarts. Nigel Mansell raced on the Long Circuits before going on to win the 1992 Formula One Season.

| 2008: Class | 1st | 2nd | 3rd | GP Winner | UK Cup Winner |
|---|---|---|---|---|---|
| Division 1 | Dave Harvey | Carl Hulme | Paul Kennings | Lee Harpham | Trevor Roberts |
| MSA 250 National | Jason Dredge | Don Kennedy | James O'Reilly | Jason Dredge | Gavin Bennett |
| 250 Clubman | Sam Moss | Kevin Waring | Stuart Parker | N/A | N/A |
| 125 Open | Paul Platt | James Irvine | Dan Edwards | Paul Platt | James Irvine |
| 125 ICC | Danny Butler | Michael Groves | Bruce Crawley | Lewis Williamson | Danny Butler |

| 2009: Class | 1st | 2nd | 3rd | GP Winner | UK Cup Winner |
|---|---|---|---|---|---|
| Division 1 | Carl Hulme | Trevor Roberts | Dave Harvey | Peter Elkmann (Deu) | Carl Hulme |
| MSA 250 National | James O'Reilly | James Tucker | Jason Dredge | James Tucker | James O'Reilly |
| 250 Clubman | Paul Platt | Toby Davis | Martin Goodliffe | N/A | N/A |
| 125 Open | Dan Edwards | Lee Morgan | Louise Colin | Dan Edwards | Lee Morgan |
| 125 ICC | Lloyd Scrivens | Adam Underhill | Kevin Gray | Jake Green | Chris Needham |

| 2010: Class | Champion | GP Winner | UK Cup '0' |
|---|---|---|---|
| Division 1 | Trevor Roberts | Gavin Bennett | Trevor Roberts |
| MSA 250 National | Jason Dredge | Jason Dredge | Jason Dredge |
| 125 Open | Danny Butler | Danny Edwards | Chris Needham |

| 2011: Class | Champion | GP Winner | UK Cup '0' |
|---|---|---|---|
| Division 1 | Gavin Bennett | Carl Hulme | Gavin Bennett |
| MSA 250 National | Paul Platt | Jason Dredge | Jason Dredge |
| 125 Open | Ben Willshire | Danny Butler | Ben Willshire |

| 2012: Class | Champion | GP Winner | UK Cup '0' |
|---|---|---|---|
| Division 1 | Charles Craven | Lee Harpham | Chris Needham |
| MSA 250 National | Paul Platt | Luis Wall | Paul Platt |
| 125 Open | Danny Edwards | Danny Edwards | Matt Isherwood |

| 2013: Class | Champion | GP Winner | UK Cup '0' |
|---|---|---|---|
| Division 1 | Gavin Bennett | Gavin Bennett | Gavin Bennett |
| MSA 250 National | Paul Platt | Toby Davis | Paul Platt |
| 125 Open | Lee Harpham | Danny Edwards | Danny Edwards |

| 2014: Class | Champion | GP Winner | UK Cup '0' |
|---|---|---|---|
| Division 1 | Carl Hulme | Liam Morley | Liam Morley |
| MSA 250 National | Paul Platt | Paul Platt | Gavin Bennett |
| 125 Open | Chris Needham | Chris Needham | Chris Needham |
| 450 | | Stephen Clark | |

| 2015: Class | Champion | GP Winner | UK Cup '0' |
|---|---|---|---|
| Division 1 | Liam Morley | Liam Morley | Liam Morley |
| MSA 250 National | Gavin Bennett | Paul Platt | Dan Clark |
| 125 Open | Lee Harpham | Chris Needham | Kirk Cattermole |
| 450 | | Stephen Clark | |

== Press features ==
Outside of motoring circles, Superkarts are under-publicised. In May 2007, Autocar magazine ran a video track test of a 250 National Superkart round Cadwell Park, with Chris Harris describing Superkart drivers as "... completely mad", and "... the biggest collection of loonies anywhere on planet earth". Even David Coulthard described driving a Superkart as "one of the most frightening things I have ever had to do". In 2009, Valentino Rossi drove a Superkart round Mazda Raceway Laguna Seca, beating the Superkart veterans and former Moto GP heroes Wayne Rainey and Eddie Lawson in an exhibition race before the Moto GP round at Laguna.
