= Suzuki GSX-R750 =

Sports motorcycle

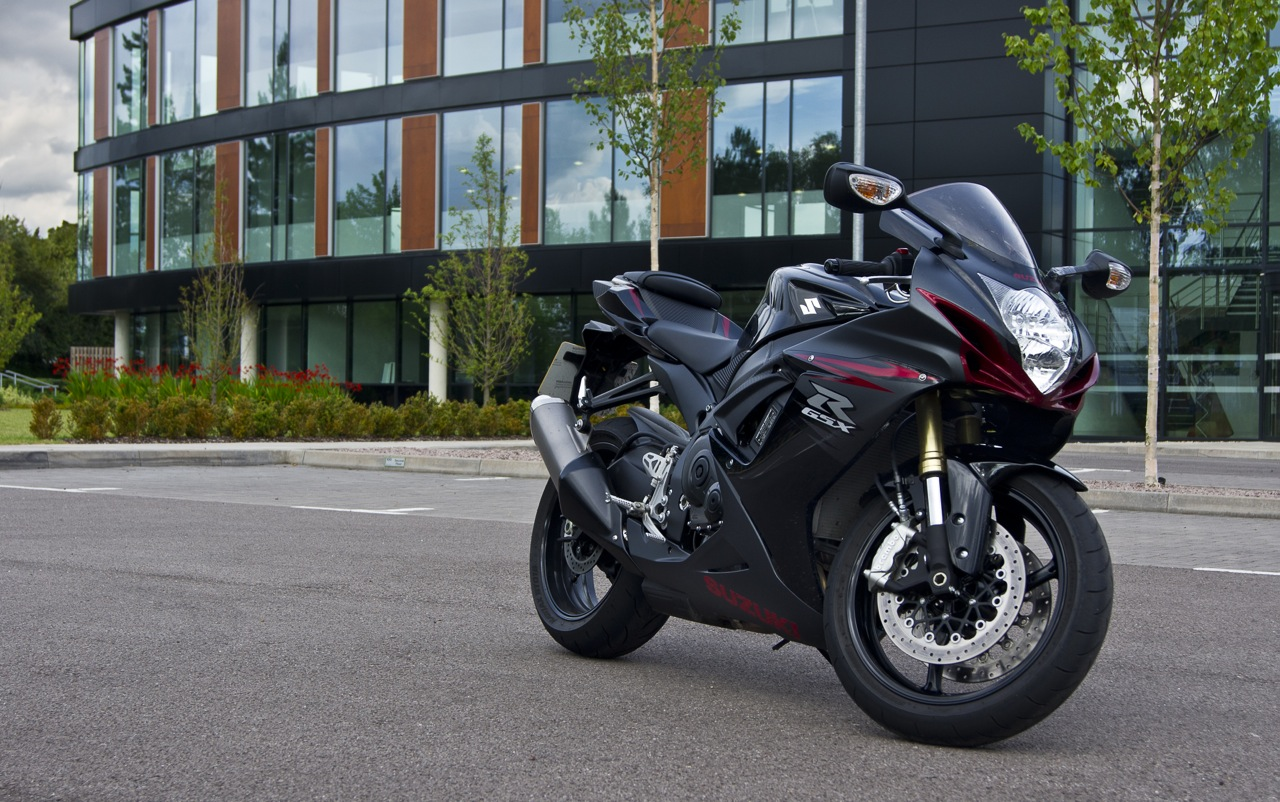
- 2011 Suzuki GSX-R750
- Manufacturer: Suzuki
- Also called: Gixxer
- Production: 1984–present
- Class: Sports motorcycle
- Engine: 749.7 cc (45.75 cu in) , 4-stroke, liquid-cooled, DOHC, 4 valves per cylinder, transverse 4
- Bore / stroke: 70.0 mm × 48.7 mm (2.76 in × 1.92 in)
- Top speed: 240 km/h (150 mph)
- Power: 74 kW (99 hp; 101 PS) @ 10,500 rpm
- Torque: 73 N⋅m (54 lbf⋅ft) @ 10,000 rpm
- Transmission: 6-speed constant-mesh manual, chain-drive, wet, multi-plate clutch
- Rake, trail: 26°
- Wheelbase: 1410
- Seat height: 810 mm (32 in)
- Weight: 176 kg (388 lb) (dry); 205 kg (452 lb) (wet)
- Fuel capacity: 17
- Related: Suzuki GSX-R600; Suzuki GSX-R1000

The Suzuki GSX-R750 is a sports motorcycle made by Suzuki since 1984. It was introduced at the Cologne Motorcycle Show in October 1984 as a motorcycle of the GSX-R series for the 1985 model year.

== Air and oil cooled ==
The air and oil-cooled models can be divided into the first-generation and the second-generation colloquially referred to as 'slabbies' and 'slingshots' respectively. The 1985-1987 models featured very flat bodies compared to modern sport-bikes, hence the term 'slab-sided'. 1988-1991 (1992 USA) models are sometimes referred to as slingshots because the carburetors introduced in 1988 were marketed as slingshot carburetors (slingshot describes the cross-section of the semi-flat slide carbs).

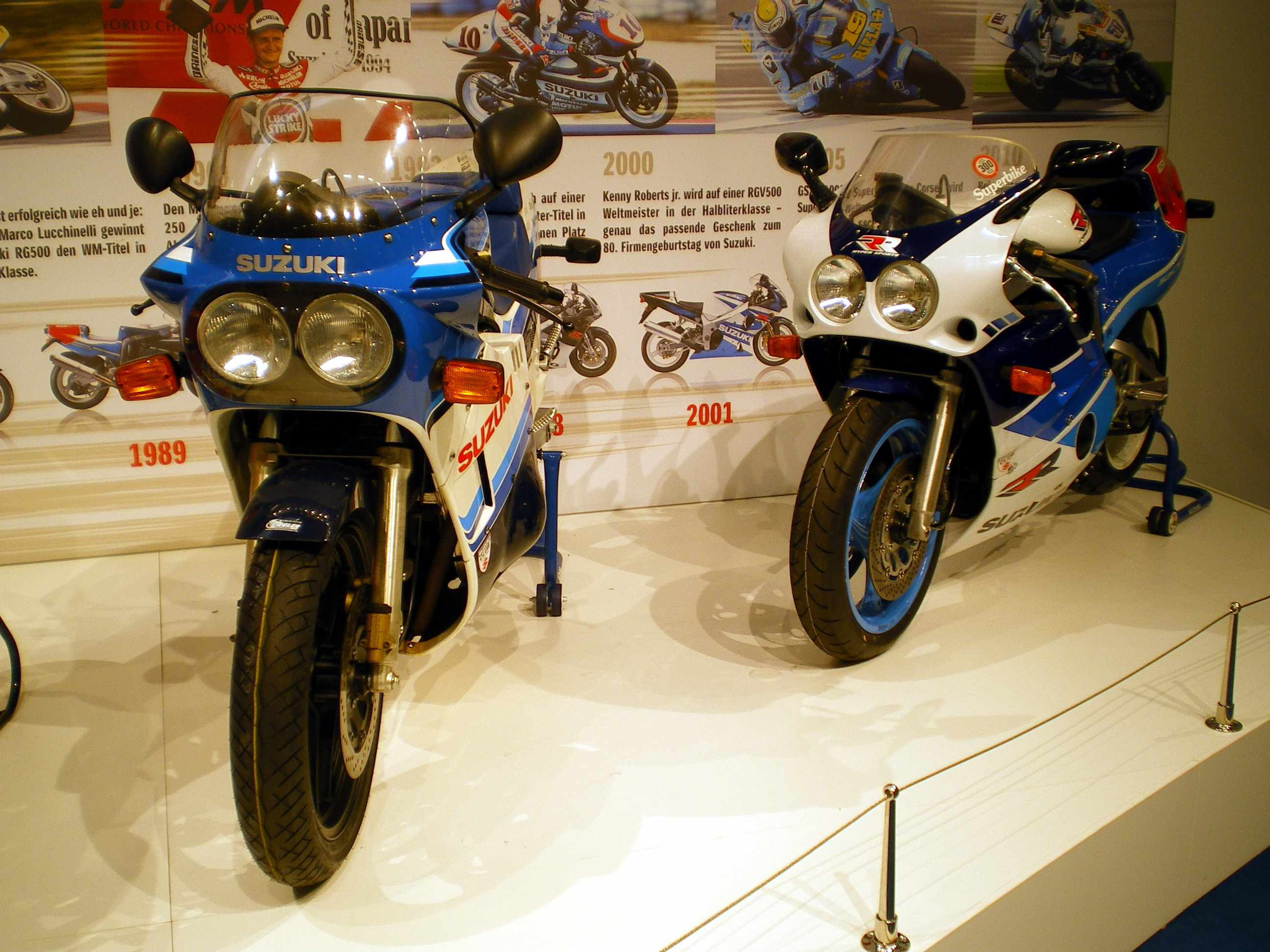
1985 GSX-R 750 (Left) & 1989 GSX-R 750 R (Right)

=== GSX-R750 (F) 1985 (The Classic) ===
The original model featured a lightweight aluminum alloy frame, flat slide Mikuni VM29SS carburettors, twin discs with 4-pot calipers, and 460-millimetre (18 in) tyres both front and rear. To save weight, the designers specified an air-and-oil-cooled engine, rather than a water-cooled engine. The seat has separate front and rear sections but from 1986 onwards all models have a one-piece seat.

=== GSX-R750 (G) 1986 ===
The 1986 model received a 25 mm longer swing arm to improve the handling. Apart from a modified belly pan and upgraded headlamps, there is very little difference between the 1985 and 1986 models, other than the introduction of Mikuni CV carbs on some markets. 1986 is the first year the model was introduced to the US.

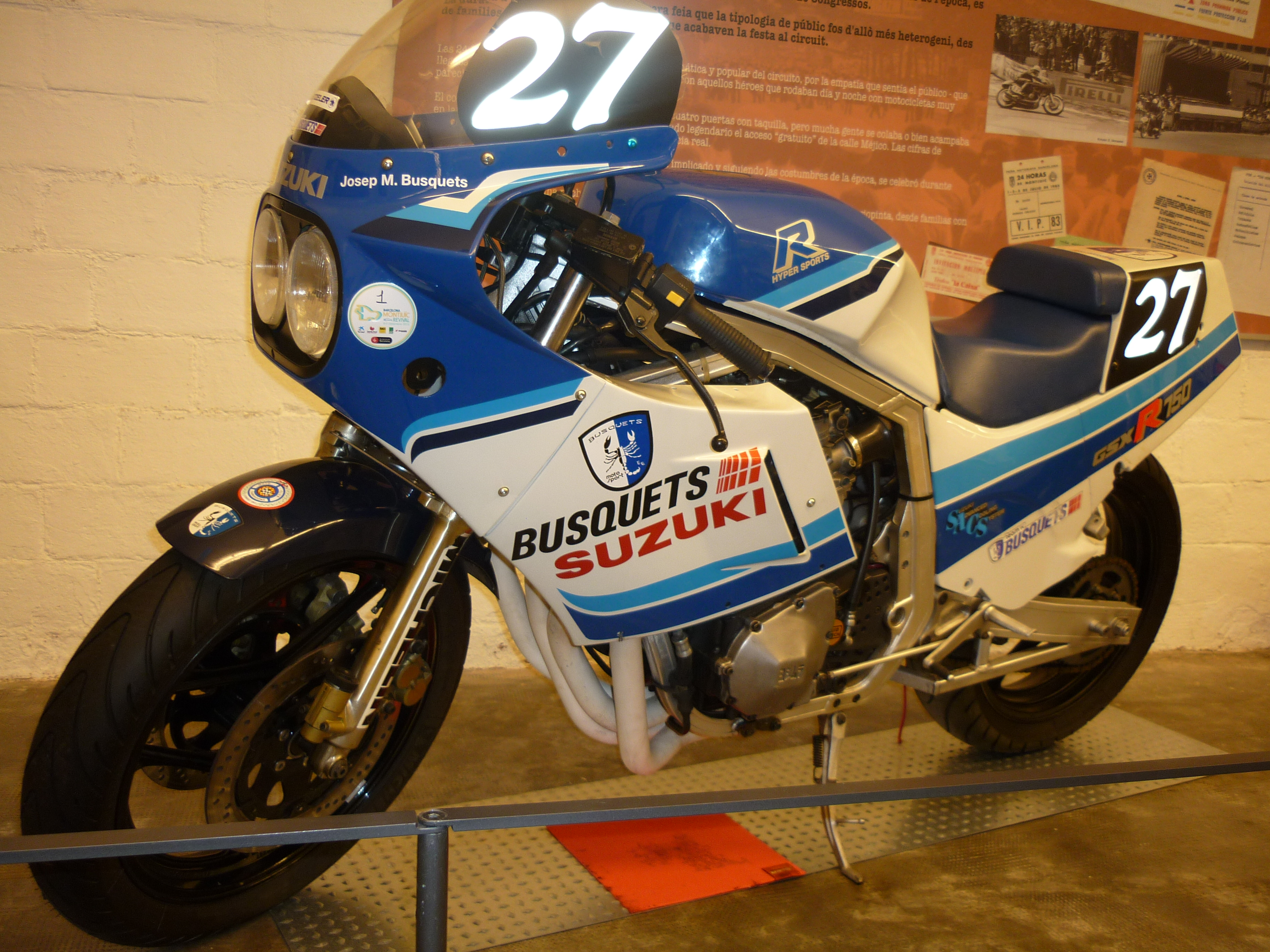
1986 GSX-R 750R

=== GSX-R750R 1986 ===
The Racing homologation Limited Edition model. 500 were manufactured worldwide, with 199 made for the US, 20 for Canada and 150 for the Japanese market. Its $6,499.99 retail price was 40% more expensive than the standard (G) model, making it the most expensive Japanese sport-bike money could buy that year. Unique items that differentiate this model from the standard (G) model include a dry clutch system, close-ratio 6 speed transmission, 29mm flat-slide carbs, 19L steel gas tank, hand-laid fiberglass solo rear section with single racing seat, side bodywork utilizing Dzus quick release fasteners and Limited-Edition graphics.

The distinctive clutch and actuator housing along with the sprocket cover are all made of magnesium for reduced weight. The clutch actuation is uniquely cable operated rather than hydraulic, offering greater feel and lighter weight. Suspension features the 1986 GSX-R1100's electronically controlled 41mm NEAS anti-dive forks, rims, brake calipers & larger 310mm floating discs, specially designed front brake hoses, a unique "3 point" steering damper and broader clip on handlebars. Out back, a 1" longer swingarm is fitted with threaded inserts for a racing style paddock stand, and an aluminium-bodied shock absorber with remote gas-charged reservoir. Other features found only on this model include a gold plated chain, uniquely patterned exhaust heat shield, premium aluminum exhaust hanger, heal guards, chain guard, bar-end weights, adjustable clutch lever, a visually machined top triple clamp and changes to the bodywork to improve cooling. To seal the deal, included with the purchase were 2 complete sets of racing numbers.

There were two variants of the 1986 GSXR750 Limited Edition. One version was released in the US, Europe and Canada and another was for the Japanese market. The Japanese version had red and gray graphics, along with a fuel gauge, headlight kill switch, tinted turn signal lenses, Japanese-spec city lights, and a black four-into-one "Ray Gun" exhaust system. The non Japanese variant came in a red, white and blue livery, did not have the Japan only items and sported an exhaust pipe with an aluminum heat shield.

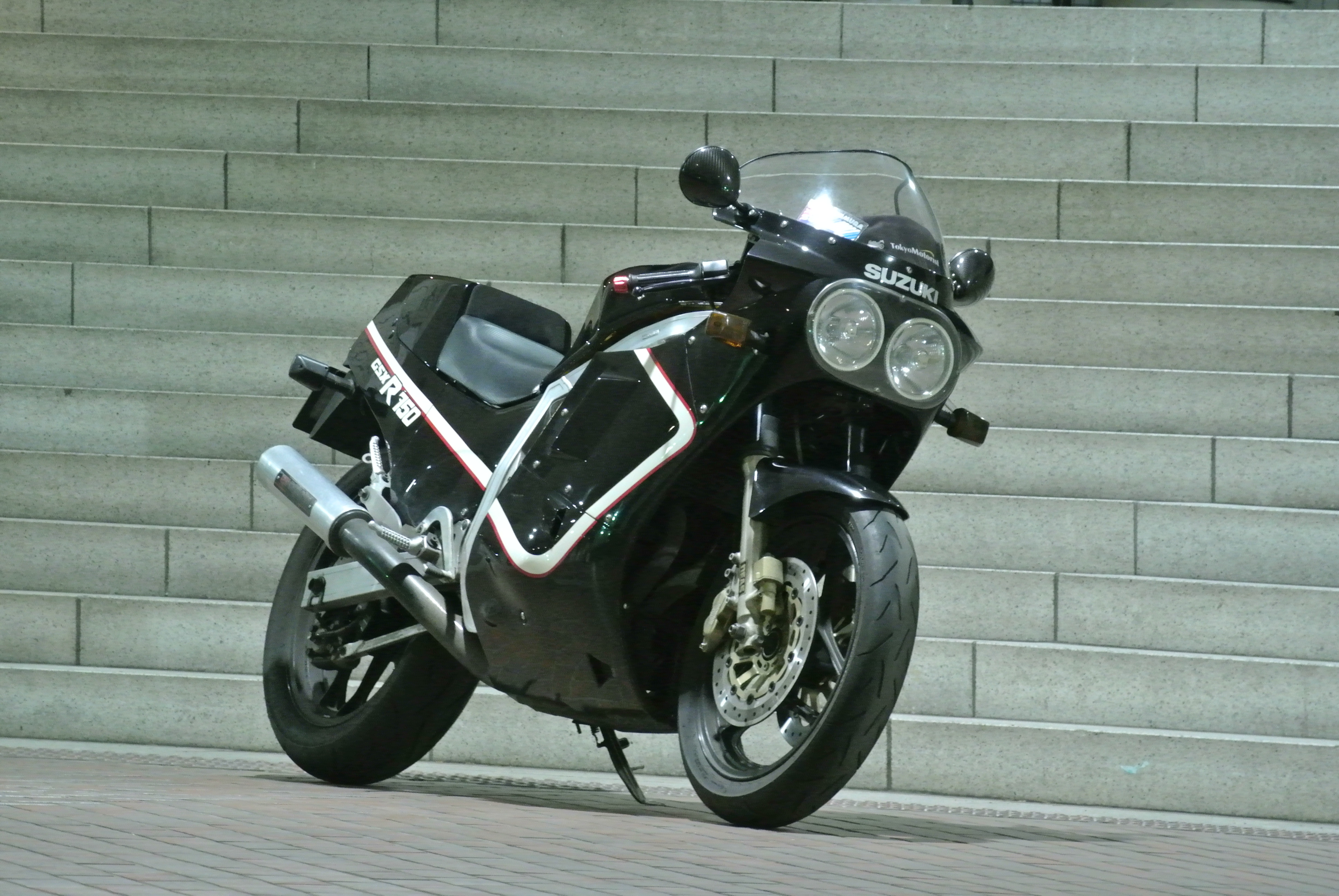
1987 GSX-R 750

=== GSX-R750 (H) 1987 ===
The 1987 model received upgraded 41 millimeter front forks with NEAS (New Electrically Activated Suspension) from the previous year's RR and a steering damper was fitted as standard (note this was only the Japanese model, everyone else got the same forks/brakes as the 85/86 ). The fuel tank capacity was increased to 21 liters.

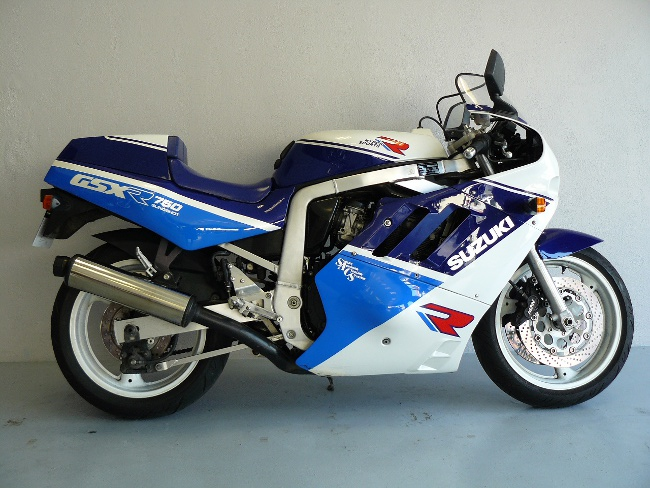
1988 GSX-R 750

=== GSX-R750 (J) 1988 ===
First major revision. New chassis design, engine revisions, and bodywork. Introduction of a new short-stroke version of the oil-cooled engine, now displacing 748 cc. The engine had 73 millimeter bore and 44.7 millimeter stroke and could achieve higher engine speeds (13,000 rpm redline indicated, but rev limiter engaged at 13,500 according to the Suzuki shop manual). Internal engine dimensions changed to accommodate the new bore and stroke. This engine used larger valves and carburetors than in previous years. Mikuni model BST36SS 'Slingshot' carbs were 36 millimeter diameter and featured vacuum operated slides; the slide cross section resembled the shape of a slingshot. A four spring clutch was used on the short stroke motor. New styling, and twin black silencers. Wheels were now a 17-inch (430 mm) diameter, three-spoke design, and used a 160/60VR17 in the rear and 120/70VR17 in the front. Slingshot graphic first appeared on the bodywork. Forks now used a cartridge design and were 43 millimeter in diameter. The second-generation model was heavier than the first but had a stiffer frame and more power.

=== GSX-R750 (K) 1989 ===
Minor changes such as modified lower bodywork, changes to graphics, and silver exhaust silencers. Magazines reported that the exhaust manifold now featured small chamfers on the collector for increased ground clearance. Cycle magazines also reported a change to the rear shock mounting geometry and front fork length to improve ground clearance. Graphics/paint schemes varied slightly between global markets. US models were available in blue/white and red/white schemes. The SACS acronym decal, located on the lower bodywork of the blue/white models, changed from a diagonal lettering to a straight lettering.

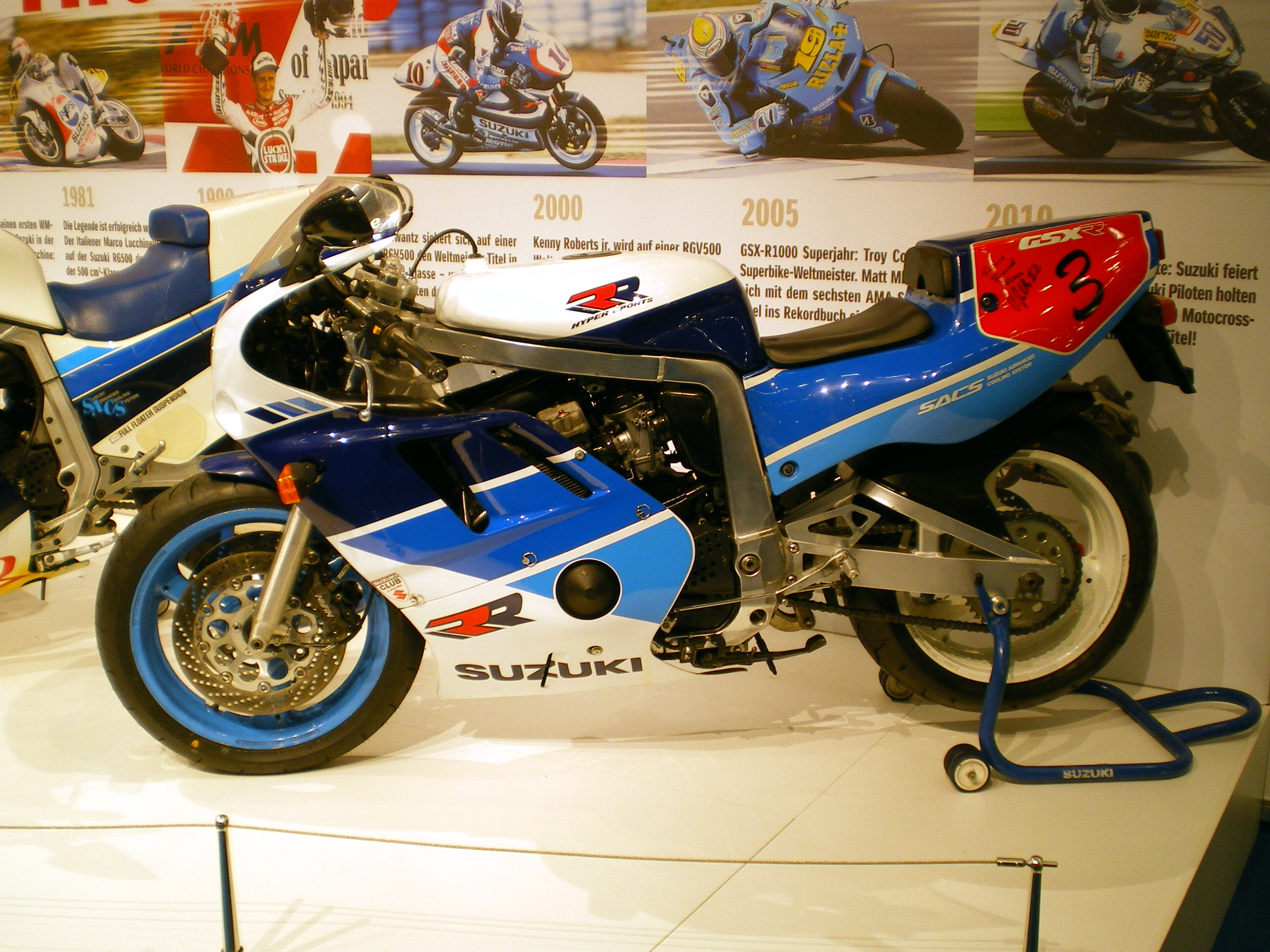
1989 GSX-R 750 R

=== GSX-R750RK 1989 ===
The GSX-R750RK, also known as the RR, was a limited edition a version first produced in 1989. Out of 500 made, 200 went to Europe and none to the US. Limited edition racing homologation model. The redesigned engine reverted to the original long-stroke (70 x 48.7 millimeter) configuration. The crankcase, crankshaft connecting rods, and clutch were upgraded to serve as a ready to race platform. The RR also received new 40 millimeter Slingshot carbs and 4-into-1 exhaust pipe, close-ratio gearbox, braced rear swing arm, single-seat unit, and 19 liter aluminum fuel tank. Only 150 were sold in the U.S.

=== GSX-R750 (L) 1990 ===
Although this model looks very similar to the previous '89 model many changes were made. The 90 models featured changes to the engine, suspension, bodywork, brakes, and chassis. This was the first GSX-R to be fitted with inverted forks as standard (USA models retained the conventional forks until 1991) and returned to the bore and stroke of the original long-stroke engine.

The engine returned to the 749 cc engine bore and stroke dimensions of the original long-stroke engine but still maintained the 13,000 rpm redline. It now featured an mm valve (smaller than the 88-89 short stroke but larger than the 85–87) and used larger carburetors.

The new Mikuni model BST38SS carburetors were 38 mm diameter and featured an additional "Powerjet" high-speed circuit that was used to fine-tune fuel mixture from 10,000 rpm to the rev limiter. In the unrestricted USA bikes, the Powerjet circuit was jetted with a "zero" sized jet and activating the circuit simply required replacing the "zero" jet with a #57.5 to #62.5 jet. All other worldwide bikes with the 38 millimeter carbs came equipped with a functioning Powerjet circuit. The slide breathers were now divorced from the airbox.

The exhaust system was also changed, gone were the dual silencers and replaced with one stainless steel silencer on the right side. The transmission output shaft was lengthened to accommodate a wider wheel. A new curved oil-cooler design and oil lines (attached to the oil pan similar to the original 85-87 engines) were installed.

The frame was changed for 1990 and used some of the features from the 1989 GSX-R 1100 frame. The rake was now 25.5 degrees and wheelbase 55.7 inches (1,410 mm). The front suspension now had inverted forks, the triple clamps (yokes), and handlebars were changed to accommodate the new forks. The rear suspension featured a new damper (shock) and swingarm. The rear damper (shock) now had a remote reservoir and damping adjustment. The revised swingarm now featured cast ends for the axle adjustment. The rear wheel was widened to 5.5 inches (140 mm) (previously 4.5 inches (110 mm)) but the tire size remained the same. A non-adjustable steering damper was added which attached from the left frame rail to a clamp on the left fork (US models did not receive the damper but the frame had the tapped mounting holes). The rear sprocket carrier and sprocket changed to a six-bolt design (previously five). The front brake rotors changed to a slotted design (previously cross drilled holes).

The bodywork changed slightly also. The side vents became less rectangular and in a slightly different position. Anew fender was also used with the inverted forks (except the U.S.).

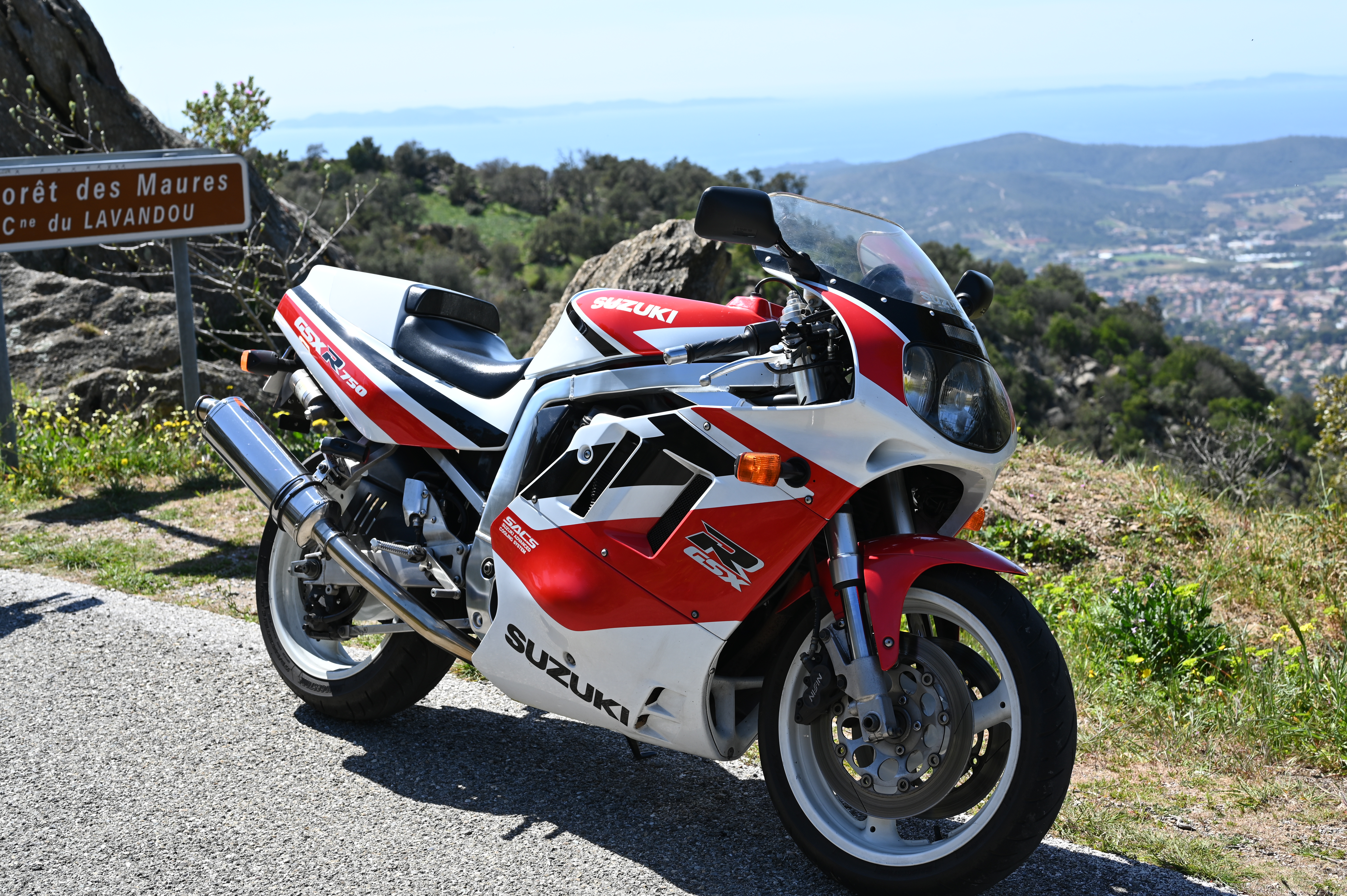
1991 GSX-R 750

=== GSX-R750 (M) 1991 ===
The '91 GSX-R750M gained 15 kg over the previous model. The most notable feature of the " M " are the faired in headlamps and a slanted nose, both of which were designed to reduce drag. Also fitted was a new larger seat and new rear bodywork that featured twin tail lamps. This was the last GSX-R to use the oil-cooled SACS engine (except for the U.S.). Internal engine changes included a new valvetrain that used one dedicated cam lobe and rocker arm (finger follower) per valve (previous models used one lobe and one forked rocker per two valves). Valve clearance (lash) was now adjusted with shims (previous models used a screw and nut). The cam duration and indexing changed slightly as well as the porting according to a magazine article. The rear tire width was increased to a 170 millimeter section width. The gauges also changed to white-colored needles (previously amber colored).

=== GSX-R750 (N) 1992 Oil Cooled ===
1992 US models are the same as the 1991 with different paint and graphics. All other markets got the new water-cooled GSX-R 750. Mikuni Carburetor 36

== Water-cooled ==
=== GSX-R750 (WN) 1992 ===
New water-cooled engine and revised frame, bodywork, and suspension. USA market models retained the oil-cooled engine and the USA 1992 model is basically the same as the 91 models with different graphics. A sleeved down version was available as the GSXR-600 for 92 and 93, both years were available with inverted forks. The 1992 GSXR-600 was water-cooled for the US market while the 750 had to wait one more year.

=== GSX-R750 (WP) 1993 ===
Mostly cosmetic changes, a major revision of engine internals, the crank & connecting rods were forged steel instead of cast iron. Valve-train was revised as well which allowed for a significant increase in power.

=== GSX-R750 (WR) 1994 ===
Reduced power and weight on last year's model. The inverted forks for this year were blue anodized. The swinging arm now has upper bracing (similar to 750RK) rather than the 'banana' style of the previous model.

=== GSX-R750 SPR 1994-1995 ===
The 'SPR' limited-edition racing homologation model has special factory parts including wide-mouthed TRM40 carbs, close-ratio gearbox, magnesium engine covers, an alloy water pump, six-piston brake calipers, and a new braced swingarm. A wider rear wheel holding a wider 180 rear section tire was also fitted. The 'SPR' was 10 kilos lighter than the WP.

=== GSX-R750 (WS) 1995 ===
The last model to use the double-cradle for more stiffness over the 94 model year and the top fairing was all new with lighter, twin reflector beam headlights. Touted by Motorcyclist as having the most ground clearance leaned over, just behind a Ducati 916.

== SRAD ==
The SRAD (Suzuki Ram Air Direct) provides air intakes at the front that force air directly into the airbox. All models as of 1996 have employed this design.

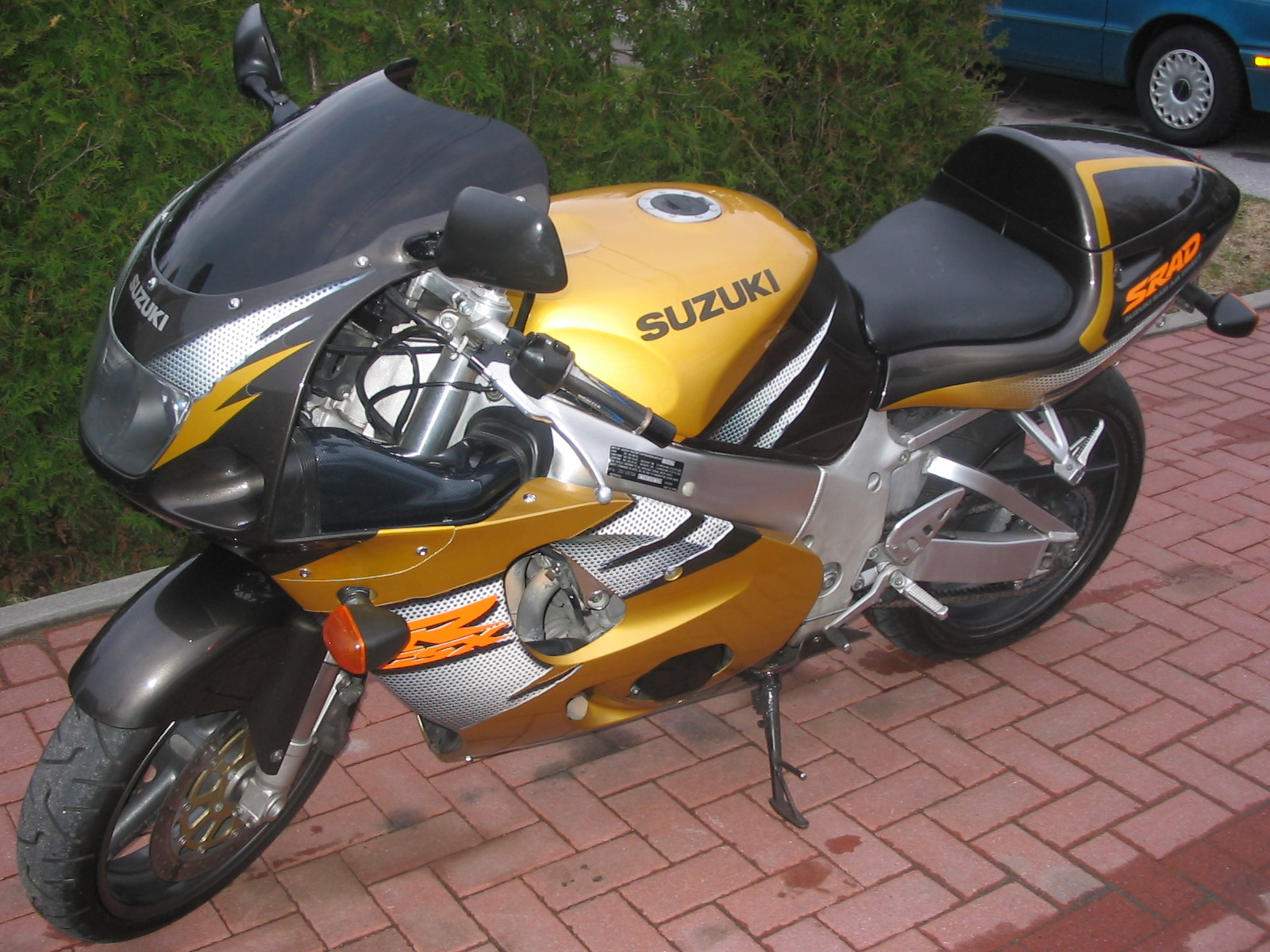
1996 GSX-R 750

=== GSX-R750 (T) 1996 ===
The 1996 GSX-R introduced a new twin-spar frame which was derived from Suzuki's RGV 500 GP racer. A new compact and lightweight engine incorporated magnesium covers on the cylinder head, starter motor, and clutch cover to aid weight reduction. These changes resulted in a decrease in weight by 20 kg to 179 kg, while power had increased to a 128 hp (95 kW). This year's model finally addressed the weight problems that had plagued the GSX-R through the first half of the 90s.

Other features included an electronically controlled "main jet block off under decel" system (for emissions purposes) 39 millimeter Mikuni carburetors and 43 mm inverted forks which were fully adjustable. Also, a 17-inch rear rim was fitted as standard with a 190/50-17 size tire as fitted to all models from 1996 to 1999.

=== GSX-R750 (V) 1997 ===
Minor internal tweaks on the 1996 model, improved aerodynamics.

=== GSX-R750 (W) 1998 ===
Introduction of electronic fuel injection. Gain in power to 134-135 bhp.

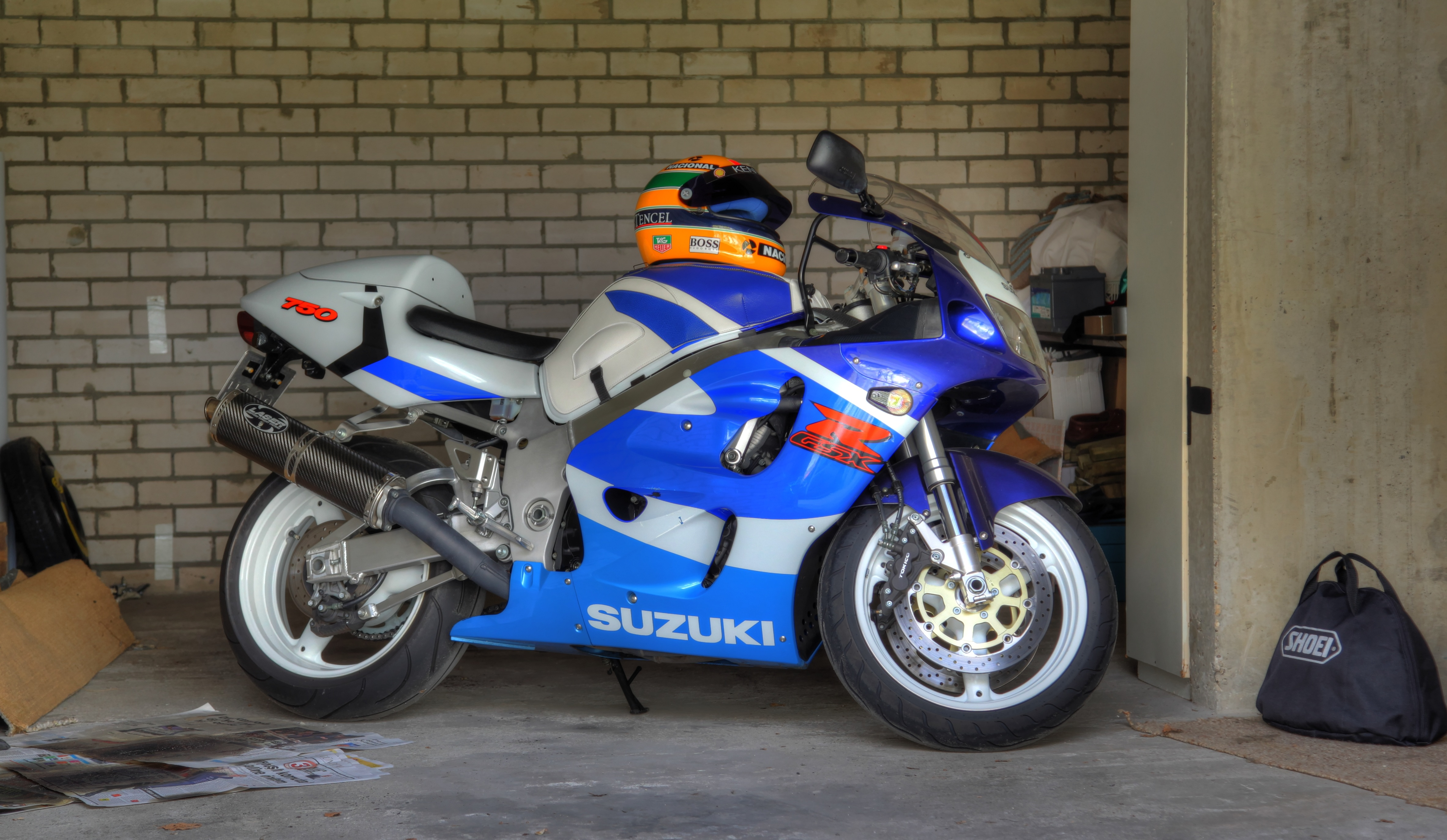
1999 GSX-R 750

=== GSX-R750 (X) 1999 ===
Only minor modifications were carried out on the 1999 model consisting of new graphics and a few internal tweaks. The 1999 Model year GSX-R won the sport bike of the year award and produced 134 Crank Horsepower for the final year of the SRAD design. The manual also lists the rear wheel as having increased to 190 millimeters from 180 millimeters in the previous years. A steering damper was fitted under the bottom yoke. A 6" rear wheel was supplied on UK and EU model bikes from 1998 Model WW. This rim took a 190/50/17 tire.

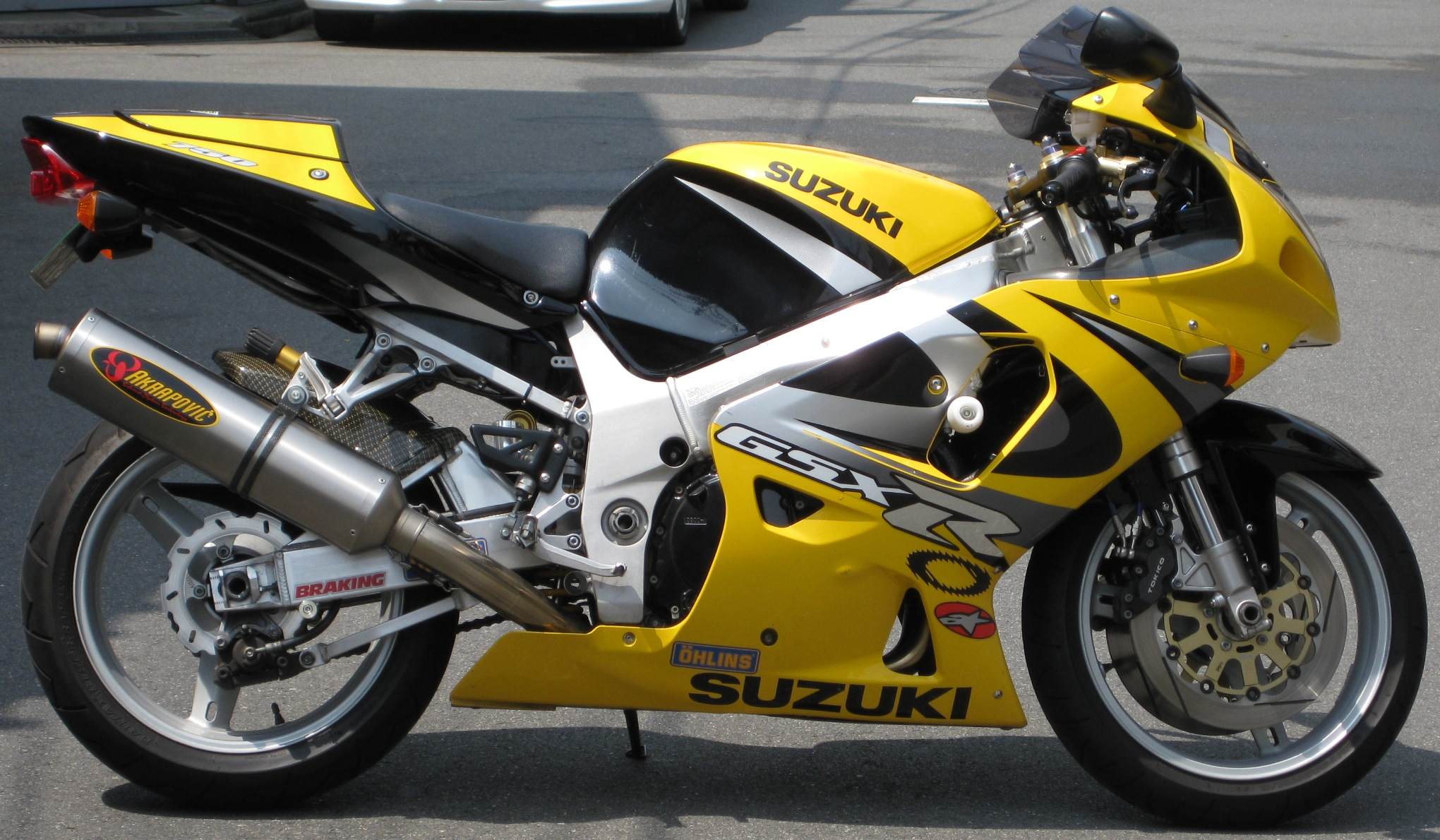
2000 GSX-R 750

=== GSX-R750 Y 2000 ===
All New Model covering 2000 through 2003 -Lighter Stronger Faster: Sometimes called superman bike because of headlight shape.

Engine: Much smaller yet stronger motor, upgraded fuel injection with improved fueling correction for barometric pressure/altitude, redesigned narrower cylinder head with straighter intake tracts, bigger air box, better ram air, stainless steel 4 into 1 exhaust, lighter stronger engine components, and covers. Body: More aerodynamic bodywork, smaller frontal area, redesigned instrument cluster, new LCD information (odometer, coolant temperature, clock).

Frame: New re-designed twin spar frame, extended swingarm, lighter front brakes to reduce unsprung mass, lighter cast wheels to reduce rotating mass.

=== GSX-R750 K1 2001 ===
Transmission had a number of parts changed due to design defect that caused 2nd gear to slip and cause transmission failures. The input shaft and a number of other parts were upgraded and an internal service bulletin issued by Suzuki to its dealerships.

=== GSX-R750 K2 2002 ===
Few minor tweaks for 2002: Changes to the EFI, new adjustable swingarm, new mirrors, and new fully brushed exhaust.

=== GSX-R750 K3 2003 ===
Colors changed. First-year that bikes have lights on 24 hrs (UK). Redesign year (Not UK).

2004 GSX-R 750 (K4) with Scorpion carbon can

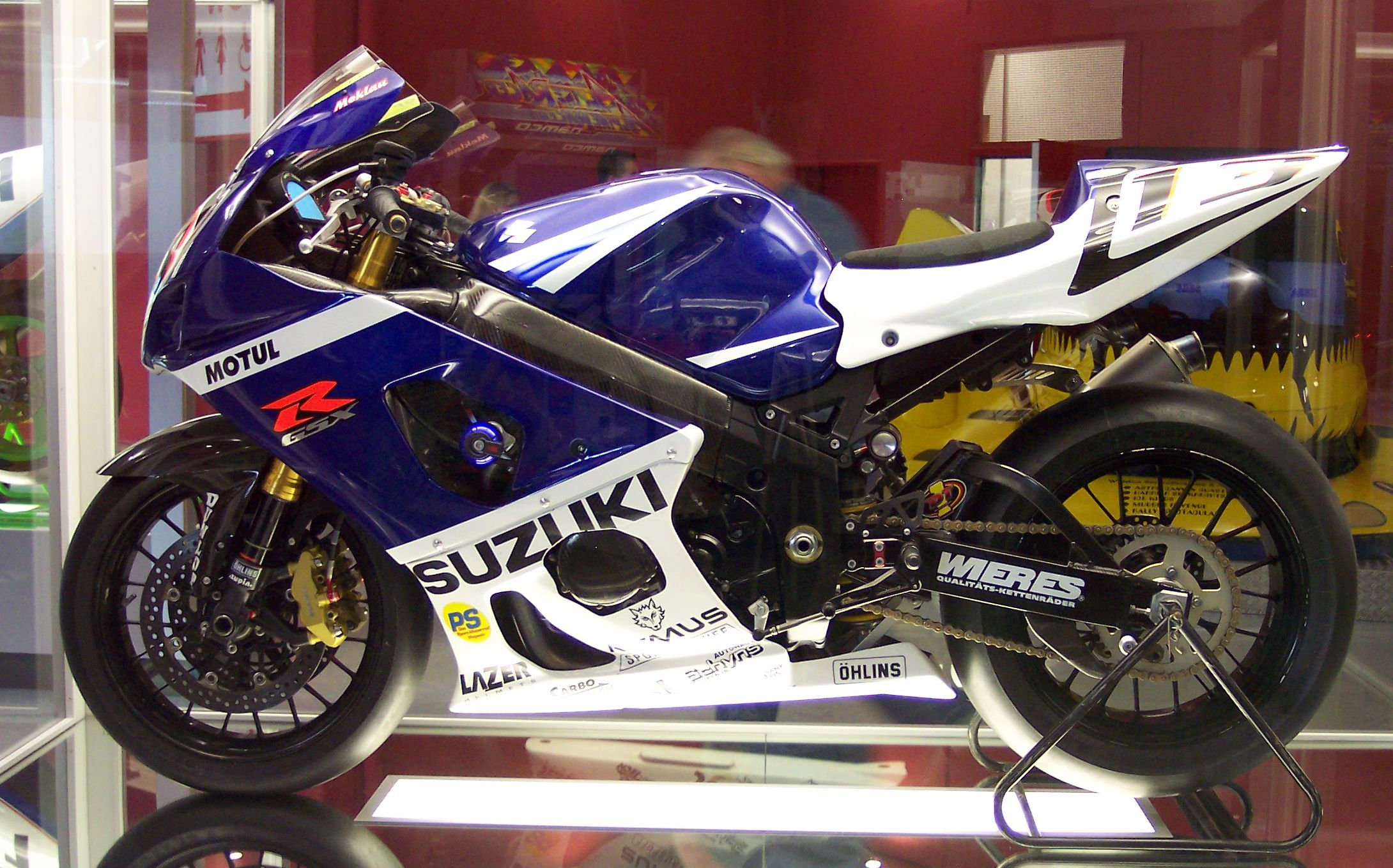
2004 GSX-R 750 (K4) with race bodywork

=== GSX-R750 K4 2004 ===
Refined version of the 00-03 model years. ECU now 32 bit, from 16 bit, titanium valves, new body work, black powdercoated frame and swingarm, and 4-piston radially mounted Tokico brakes. The engine produced 147 hp (110 kW) claimed power at crank shaft; 127.3 hp (94.9 kW) at 12,750 rpm rear wheel hp tested by bike magazine on uncertified dynamometer, and torque of 79 N.m (58.2 ft.lb) @ 10,750 rpm. Redline was 14,500 rpm.

Dry weight was just 163 kg (359 lb) making it one of the lightest GSX-R's ever produced.

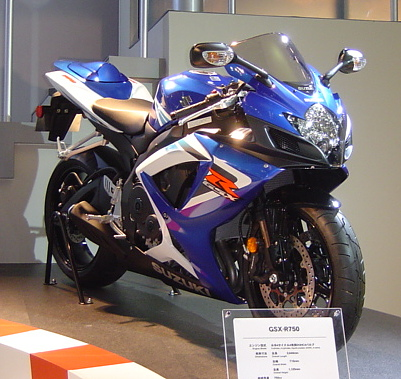
2006 GSX-R 750 (K6)

=== GSX-R750 K5 2005 ===
Besides changing color on the motorcycle, Suzuki celebrated the 20th anniversary of the model by launching the Suzuki 20th Anniversary GSX-R 750, which included custom paint, custom exhaust, and sunex brake rotors... EL blue chain, blue seat and 20th-anniversary placards.

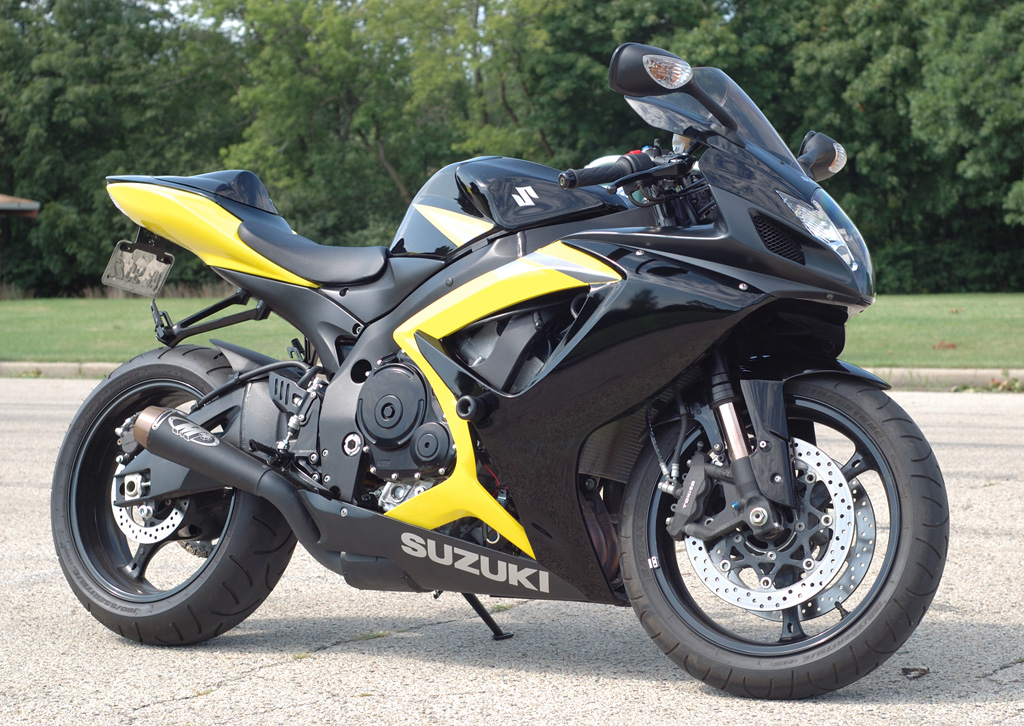
2006 GSX-R 750 (K6)

=== GSX-R750 K6, K7 2006-2007 ===
Redesign year. New frame and swingarm and motor. Stroke increased and transmission is now stacked. Rotors also went from 300 mm to 310 mm. Modifications compared to the previous model include all-new compact and lightweight 4-stroke, 4-cylinder, liquid-cooled engine designed for overall weight reduction, optimum combustion efficiency, and power delivery. Re-designed cylinder head with narrower valve angles creating a more compact combustion chamber design, higher 12.5:1 compression ratio, large intake and exhaust ports for improved intake and exhaust efficiency, and high power output Valve bucket diameters are increased to work with more aggressive camshafts. Lightweight titanium valves with steel alloy springs and aluminum spring retainers operated by thin-wall hollow camshafts to reduce weight and inertia.

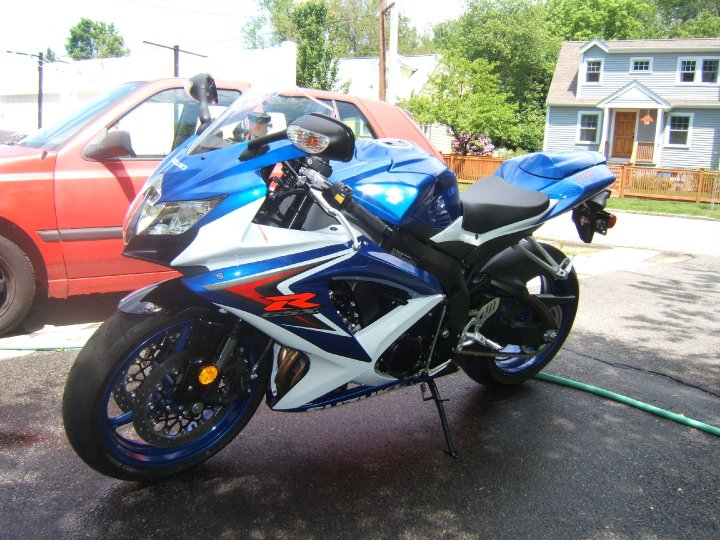
2008 Suzuki GSX-R 750 (K8)

=== GSX-R750 K8, K9, L0 2008-2010 ===
New model - revised headlights, new colors, multi-mode power adjustments. At the rear wheel, the engine produces 123 hp (92 kW) at 12,500 rpm, and torque of 53.4 lbf⋅ft (72.4 N⋅m) @ 11,200 rpm. The dry weight is 394 lb (179 kg).

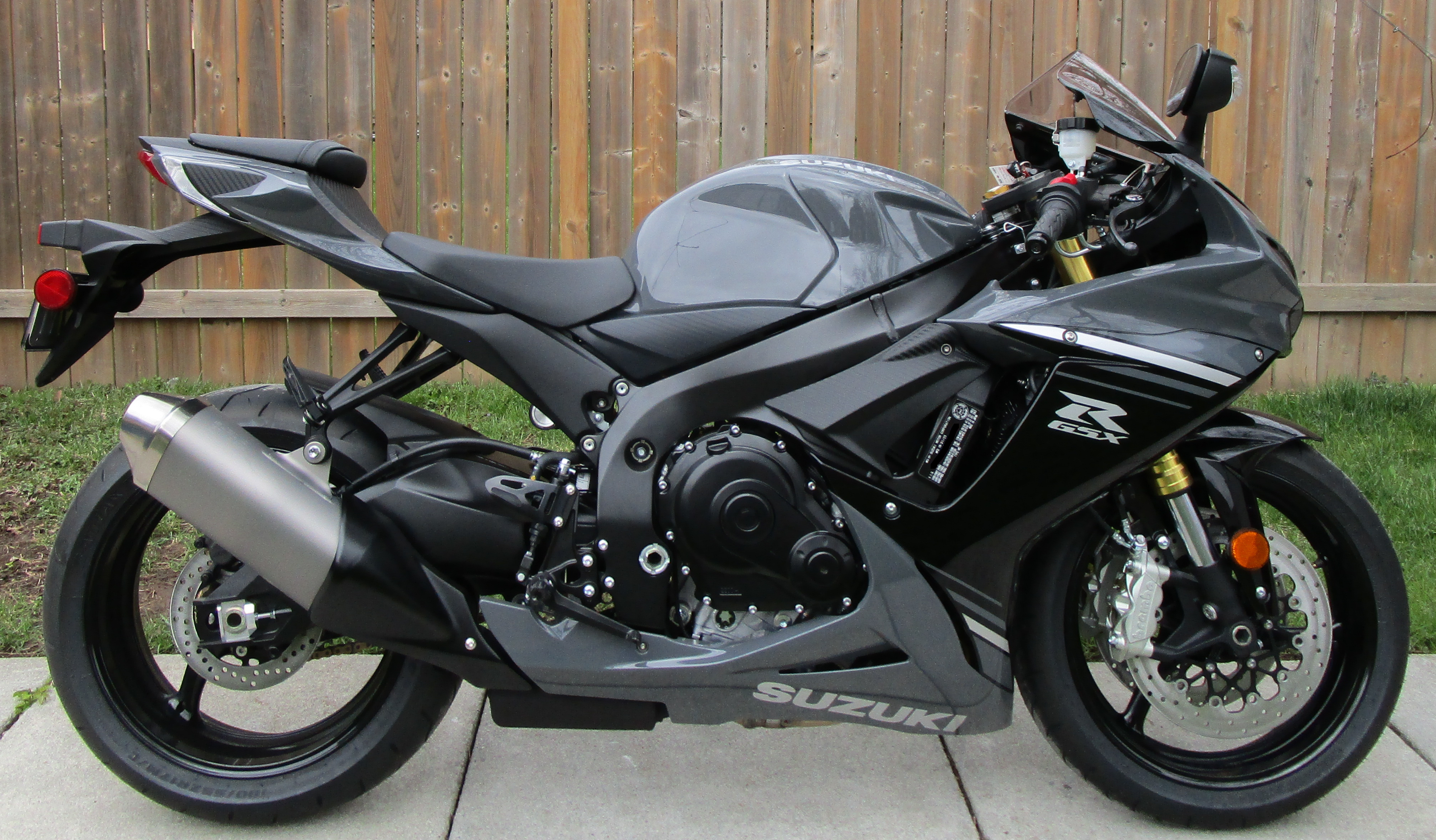
2025 Suzuki GSX-R750 M5

=== GSX-R750 L1-L9, M0-M6 2011-2026 ===
Currently the longest ever produced GSX-R 750 series without any major changes. New model, clean and sleek body style, new headlight, addition of Italian made Brembo brake calipers (front) and Nissin (back). The 2011 model is about 9 kilograms (20 lb) lighter than the previous year's model. It has a "back torque limiting" clutch that allows for slicker downshifting. A lightweight Showa Big Piston Fork (BPF) comes standard along with a Showa rear shock. Features a more compacted instrument panel which was inspired by the GSX-R1000 instrument panel. The engine power produced at the rear wheel is 127.9 hp (95.4 kW) @ 12,600 rpm. Torque at the rear wheel is 55.7 lbf⋅ft (75.5 N⋅m) @ 11,100 rpm. The wet weight is 194.1 kg (428 lb).

== See also ==
- Suzuki GSX-S750
