= 1962 British Formula Three season =

Seasons
- ← 1961 1963 →

The 1962 British Formula Junior season was the 13th season of the British Formula Junior season. This was replaced by Formula Three specification cars in 1964. Peter Arundell took the B.A.R.C. Championship, while John Fenning took the B.R.C.S.S. Championship, as well as the B.R.S.C.C. John Davy British Championship.

== B.A.R.C. Championship ==
Champion: (United Kingdom) Peter Arundell

=== Results ===
Date	Round	Circuit	Winning driver	Winning team	Winning car
24/03	Rd. 1	(United Kingdom) Goodwood	(United Kingdom) Richard Prior	Lola Equipe	Lola-Ford Mk5
31/03	Rd. 2	(United Kingdom) Silverstone	(United Kingdom) Richard Attwood	Midland Racing Partnership	Cooper-Ford T59
14/04	Rd. 3	(United Kingdom) Snetterton	(United Kingdom) Peter Arundell	Team Lotus	Lotus-Ford 22
23/04	Rd. 4	(United Kingdom) Goodwood	(United Kingdom) Peter Arundell	Team Lotus	Lotus-Ford 22
28/04	Rd. 5	(United Kingdom) Aintree	(United Kingdom) Peter Arundell	Team Lotus	Lotus-Ford 22
12/05	Rd. 6	(United Kingdom) Silverstone	(United Kingdom) Peter Arundell	Team Lotus	Lotus-Ford 22
11/06	Rd. 7	(United Kingdom) Crystal Palace	(United Kingdom) Alan Rees	Team Lotus	Lotus-Ford 22
11/08	Rd. 8	(United Kingdom) Oulton Park	(United Kingdom) David Hobbs	Midland Racing Partnership	Cooper-Ford T59
18/08	Rd. 9	(United Kingdom) Goodwood	(United Kingdom) Peter Arundell	Team Lotus	Lotus-Ford 22
01/09	Rd. 10	(United Kingdom) Crystal Palace	(United Kingdom) Alan Rees	Team Lotus	Lotus-Ford 22
22/09	Rd. 11	(United Kingdom) Goodwood	(United Kingdom) John Fenning	Ron Harris	Lola-Ford Mk 5
29/09	Rd. 12	(United Kingdom) Snetterton	(United Kingdom) Peter Arundell	Team Lotus	Lotus-Ford 22
06/10	Rd. 13	(United Kingdom) Silverstone	(United Kingdom) Richard Attwood	Midland Racing Partnership	Cooper-Ford T59

=== Table ===
Place	Driver	Entrant	Car	Total
1	(United Kingdom) Peter Arundell	Team Lotus	Lotus-Ford 22	
etc.

== B.R.S.C.C. Championship ==
Champion: (United Kingdom) John Fenning

=== Results ===
Date	Round	Circuit	Winning driver	Winning team	Winning car
17/03	Rd. 1	(United Kingdom) Oulton Park	(United Kingdom) Keith Francis	Keith Francis	Lotus-Ford 20
18/03	Rd. 2 Race 1	(United Kingdom) Snetterton	(United Kingdom) Martin Gould	Jim Russell Racing Driving School	Lotus-Ford 20
18/03	Rd. 2 Race 2	(United Kingdom) Snetterton	(United Kingdom) John Fenning	Ron Harris	Lotus-Ford 20
21/04	Rd. 3	(United Kingdom) Rufforth	(United Kingdom) Geoff Breakell	Geoff Breakell	Lotus-Ford 20
23/04	Rd. 4	(United Kingdom) Brands Hatch	(United Kingdom) John Fenning	Ron Harris	Lotus-Ford 20
06/05	Rd. 5 Race 1	(United Kingdom) Brands Hatch	(United States) Roy Pike	Roy Pike	Ausper-Ford T3
06/05	Rd. 5 Race 2	(United Kingdom) Brands Hatch	(United Kingdom) John Fenning	John Fenning	Lotus-Ford 20
20/5	Rd. 6 Race 1	(United Kingdom) Cadwell Park	(United Kingdom) Brian Griffin	Brian Griffin	Lotus-Ford 20
20/5	Rd. 6 Race 2	(United Kingdom) Cadwell Park	(United Kingdom) Bill Bradley	Midland Racing Partnership	Cooper-BMC T59
27/05	Rd. 7	(United Kingdom) Brands Hatch	(United Kingdom) John Rhodes	Competition Cars of Australia	Ausper-Ford T4
09/06	Rd. 8	(United Kingdom) Castle Combe	(United Kingdom) David Baker	Midland Racing Partnership	Cooper-BMC T56
30/06	Rd. 9	(United Kingdom) Oulton Park	(United Kingdom) John Fenning	Ron Harris	Lotus-Ford 20
01/07	Rd. 10	(United Kingdom) Mallory Park	(United Kingdom) Jake Pearce	Auto Racing Services	Lotus-Ford 22
15/07	Rd. 11	(United Kingdom) Snetterton	(United Kingdom) John Fenning	Ron Harris	Lotus-Ford 20
22/07	Rd. 12	(United Kingdom) Brands Hatch	(United Kingdom) John Fenning	Ron Harris	Lotus-Ford 20
28/07	Rd. 13	(United Kingdom) Oulton Park	(United Kingdom) Keith Francis	Keith Francis	Lotus-Ford 20
06/08	Rd. 14	(United Kingdom) Brands Hatch	(South Africa) Tony Maggs	Tyrrell Racing	Cooper-BMC T59
26/08	Rd. 15	(United Kingdom) Brands Hatch	(United Kingdom) Michael d’Udy	Jim Russell Racing Driving School	Lotus-Ford 22
02/09	Rd. 16	(United Kingdom) Mallory Park	(United Kingdom) Jake Pearce	Auto Racing Services	Lotus-Ford 22
08/09	Rd. 17	(United Kingdom) Rufforth	(United Kingdom) Bill Bradley	Midland Racing Partnership	Cooper-Ford T59
26/12	Rd. 18	(United Kingdom) Brands Hatch	(New Zealand) Denny Hulme	Brabham Racing	Brabham-Ford BT2

=== Table ===
Place	Driver	Entrant	Car	Total
1	(United Kingdom) John Fenning	Ron Harris	Lotus-Ford 20; Lola-Ford Mk 5	
etc.

== B.R.S.C.C. John Davy Championship ==
=== Results ===
Date	Round	Circuit	Winning driver	Winning team	Winning car
23/04	Rd. 1	(United Kingdom) Brands Hatch	(United Kingdom) John Fenning	Ron Harris	Lotus-Ford 20
06/05	Rd. 2 Race 1	(United Kingdom) Brands Hatch	(United States) Roy Pike	Roy Pike	Ausper-Ford T3
06/05	Rd. 2 Race 2	(United Kingdom) Brands Hatch	(United Kingdom) John Fenning	John Fenning	Lotus-Ford 20
27/05	Rd. 3	(United Kingdom) Brands Hatch	(United Kingdom) John Rhodes	Competition Cars of Australia	Ausper-Ford T4
22/07	Rd. 4	(United Kingdom) Brands Hatch	(United Kingdom) John Fenning	Ron Harris	Lotus-Ford 20
06/08	Rd. 5	(United Kingdom) Brands Hatch	(South Africa) Tony Maggs	Tyrrell Racing	Cooper-BMC T59
26/08	Rd. 6	(United Kingdom) Brands Hatch	(United Kingdom) Michael d’Udy	Jim Russell Racing Driving School	Lotus-Ford 22
26/12	Rd. 18	(United Kingdom) Brands Hatch	(New Zealand) Denny Hulme	Brabham Racing	Brabham-Ford BT2

=== Table ===
Place	Driver	Entrant	Car	Total
1	(United Kingdom) John Fenning	Ron Harris	Lotus-Ford 20; Lola-Ford Mk 5	14
2	(New Zealand) Denny Hulme	New Zealand Grand Prix Racing Team; Brabham Racing	Cooper-Ford T56; Brabham-Ford BT2	9
3	(South Africa) Tony Maggs	Tyrrell Racing	Cooper-BMC T59	8
4	(United Kingdom) John Rhodes	Competition Cars of Australia	Ausper-Ford T4	8
