= 1963 Brands Hatch 6 Hours =

Third round of the 1963 European Touring Car Challenge season

Layout of the Brands Hatch (1960–1975)

'The Motor' International Six Hour Saloon Car Race was the third round of the 1963 European Touring Car Challenge, and was held at Brands Hatch on the Grand Prix circuit, on 6 July.

This, the second Motor-sponsored Six-Hour saloon car race, was run in appalling conditions, like the 1962 event. The large crowd of approximately 15000, witnessed the favourite, a 7-litre Ford Galaxie driven by Dan Gurney and Jack Brabham flounder in the wet and the Jaguar Mk II dominate the race. Victory went to Roy Salvadori and Denny Hulme from Peter Lindner and Peter Nöcker after the winners on the road, Mike Salmon and Pete Sutcliffe, were disqualified for engine irregularities.

== Report ==
=== Entry ===
A fine entry of 39 cars were accepted for the event, across five classes. However, scrutineering meant trouble for those Ford Galaxies which had disc brakes; Gawaine Baillie was only allowed to start the meeting on the promise of photographic evidence of the brake mounting – otherwise he would be disqualified. John Willment Automobiles was not prepared for this and withdrew their Galaxie. Of the cars accepted, 37 cars practised.

=== Qualifying ===
Grid positions were determined by engine capacity rather than practice times. As a result, the record books show John Sprinzel on pole, in his 7-litre Ford Galaxie. However, the fastest time in practise was set by the pairing of Dan Gurney and Jack Brabham in their Galaxie.

=== Race ===
The start with the slow car of John Sprinzel on pole, brought Mike Salmon into second place in Jaguar Mk. II following the early leader, Gawaine Baillie’s Galaxie, ahead of the American Dan Gurney (Galaxie) and John Coundley (Jaguar Mk II). Handicapped by wrong tyres, Gurney spun at South Bank, but somehow the whole field avoided him. After two laps, Baillie had dropped to third, giving way to Salmon and Peter Lindner, while Gurney spun again. By the fourth lap, Gurney came in for a tyre change on the rear – before the start, he could only change the fronts.

The terrible conditions made for an interesting race; Lindner nearly lost his Jaguar Mk. II, and he was not the only one. Albert Powell hit a bank, but continued after repairs, and Mick Clare rolled his Mini. After the pit stops, at the three-hour mark, the leaders were Roy Salvadori, Salmon, Lindner (all Jaguars), Jack Sears, Jimmy Blumer (both in Cortinas) with Tom Trana in sixth, in his Volvo. The quick pit stop of the Atherstone Engineering Jaguar moved Salmon into the lead, its lead now over a lap. Salvadori/Denny Hulme were second, Sears fourth and Lindner/Peter Höcker fifth.

At 8:30 p.m., six hours after the race started and 166 laps of the Grand Prix circuit, the chequered flag dropped and the pairing of Salmon/Pete Sutcliffe won the race, with Salvadori/Hulme second, Lindner/Höcker completing the podium, just ahead of Sears/Bo Ljungfeldt with Trana/Carl-Magnus Skogh fifth. Once again scrutineering revealed problems for the winner: the Jaguar Mk. II was disqualified for having oversized inlet valves. The winner's average speed was published as 73.477mph.

== Classification ==
=== The Motor 6 hours ===
Class Winners are in Bold text. Please note that race winner, was not declared class winner.

Pos.	No.	Class	Drivers		Entrant	Car - Engine	Laps	Reason Out
DISQ	6	9	(United Kingdom) Mike Salmon	(United Kingdom) Peter Sutcliffe	Atherstone Engineering	Jaguar Mk II 3.8	166	inlet valve size
1st	5	9	(United Kingdom) Roy Salvadori	(New Zealand) Denny Hulme	Tommy Atkins	Jaguar Mk II 3.8	165	
2nd	**7**	**9**	(Germany) **Peter Lindner**	(Germany) **Peter Nöcker**		**Jaguar Mk II 3.8**	**162**	
3rd	**23**	**6**	**(United Kingdom) Jack Sears**	**(Sweden) Bo Ljungfeldt**	**John Willment Automobiles**	**Ford Cortina GT**	**162**	
4th	**16**	**7/8**	**(Sweden) Tom Trana**	**(Sweden) Carl-Magnus Skogh**	**Volvo AB**	**Volvo 122 S**	**161**	
DISQ	14	7/8	(United Kingdom) Peter Sargent	(United Kingdom) Peter Lumsden	REC Parkes	Mercedes-Benz 220SE	159	Non-homologate gear ratios
6th	**28**	**5**	**(United Kingdom) John Whitmore**	**(United Kingdom) Paddy Hopkirk**		**BMC Mini Cooper S**	**159**	
7th	2	9	(United Kingdom) Gawaine Baillie	(United Kingdom) Peter Jopp		Ford Galaxie	159	
8th	29	5	(United Kingdom) John Rhodes	(Netherlands) Rob Slotemaker	Cooper Car Co.	Morris Mini Cooper S	158	
9th	1	9	(United States) Dan Gurney	(Australia) Jack Brabham	Alan Brown	Ford Galaxie	157	
10th	24	6	(United Kingdom) Jimmy Blumer	(United Kingdom) Henry Taylor	Alan Andrews Racing	Ford Cortina Super	157	
11th	30	5	(United Kingdom) Christabel Carlisle	(United States) Denise McCluggage	Don Moore	Morris Mini Cooper S	158	
12th	9	7/8	(United Kingdom) Edward Harrison	(Kenya) John Manussis	John Willment Automobiles	Ford Zodiac Mk 3	155	
13th	20	6	(Italy) Piero Frescobaldi	(Italy) Leo Cella	HF Squadra Corse	Lancia Flavia Coupé	155	
14th	17	6	(United Kingdom) Peter Harper	(New Zealand) Chris Amon	Alan Fraser Racing Team	Sunbeam Rapier	155	
15th	**32**	**4**	**(United Kingdom) John Aley**	**(Finland) Rauno Aaltonen**	**Cooper Car Co.**	**Austin Mini Cooper S**	**154**	
16th	25	6	(Germany) Ernst Furtmayr	(Germany) Hans-Dieter Dechent	Squadra Tartaruga	Alfa Romeo Giulia TI	153	
17th	21	6	(Italy) Franco Patria	(Italy) Romolo Rossi	HF Squadra Corse	Lancia Flavia Coupé	153	
18th	33	4	(United Kingdom) Elizabeth Jones	(Finland) Timo Mäkinen	Alexander Engineering Co.	Austin Mini Cooper	153	
19th	18	6	(United Kingdom) Bill Blydenstein	(United Kingdom) Chris Lawrence	Lawrencetune Engines	Vauxhall VX4/90	153	
20th	27	5	(United Kingdom) Alan Foster	(United Kingdom) Andrew Hedges	Dick Jacobs	MG 1100	153	
21st	26	5	(United Kingdom) Anita Taylor	(United Kingdom) Anne Hall	John Willment Automobiles	Ford Anglia Super	151	
22nd	11	7/8	(Italy) Luigi Cabella	(Italy) Giorgio Pianta	HF Squadra Corse	Lancia Flaminia 3B coupé	146	
DISQ	4	9	(United Kingdom) John Sprinzel	(United States) Merton Lucia	John Sprinzel Racing	Ford Galaxie	145	Loose bonnet
24th (DNF)	4	9	(United Kingdom) Albert Powell	(United Kingdom) Ken Baker	Zenith Films	Jaguar Mk II 3.8	143	Clutch
25th	35	4	(United Kingdom) Edward Lewis	(Belgium) Julien Vernaeve	Westover Racing	Morris Mini Cooper	142	
26th (DNF)	8	9	(United Kingdom) Chris McLaren	(United Kingdom) John Couldley	Chris McLaren	Jaguar Mk II 3.8	140	Oil Leak
27th	34	4	(Netherlands) Loek Nerden	(Netherlands) Alexander Roell	Ecurie Lonertex	Austin Mini Cooper	76	Engine
DNF	12	7/8	(Italy) Piero Frescobaldi	(Italy) Carlo Facetti	HF Squadra Corse	Lancia Flaminia 3B coupé		Accident
DNF	10	7/8	(United Kingdom) Roy Pierpoint	(United Kingdom) Alan Mann	Alan Andrews Racing	Ford Zodiac Mk 3		Lost wheel
DNF	38	9	(United Kingdom) John Sparrow	(United Kingdom) Neil Dangerfield	D. M. Racing	Jaguar Mk II 3.8		Overheating
DNF	15	7/8	(Germany) Jochen Neerpasch	(Switzerland) Peter Scherrer	Squadra Tartaruga	Volvo 132 S	59	Accident
DNF	31	5	(United Kingdom) Mike Clare	(United Kingdom) Tony Rutt	Alexander Engineering Co.	BMC Mini Cooper S	34	Accident
DNF	36	4	(United Kingdom) Peter Clarke	(United Kingdom) John Anstead	Peter Clarke	Abarth 1000 Berlina Corsa	4	Misfire
DNF	22	6	(United Kingdom) Les Leston	(United Kingdom) David Haynes	John Willment Automobiles	Ford Cortina GT	3	Clutch
DNQ		9	(United Kingdom) Jack Sears	(Sweden) Bo Ljungfeldt	John Willment Automobiles	Ford Galaxie		Withdrawn after homologation dispute re disc brake fitting
DNQ	23	6	(United Kingdom) John Uren	(United Kingdom) Peter Bolton	John Willment Automobiles	Ford Cortina GT		Car taken over by Sears/Ljunfeldt
DISQ	19	6	(United Kingdom) Alan Hutcheson	(United Kingdom) Bob Anderson		Riley 1.5		Rejected at scrutineering

- Fastest lap: Denny Hulme, 2:04.000secs. (77.375 mph)

=== Class Winners ===
Class	Winners	
Overall	Salvadori / Hulme	Jaguar Mk II 3.8
Class 9	Lindner / Nöcker	Jaguar Mk II 3.8
Class 7/8	Trana / Skogh	Volvo 122 S
Class 6	Sears / Ljungfeldt	Ford Galaxie
Class 5	Whitmore / Hopkirk	BMC Mini Cooper S
Class 4	Aley / Aaltonen	Austin Mini Cooper S

== Standings after the race ==
Pos	Championship	Points
1	(Italy) Luigi Cabella	29
2	(United Kingdom) John Aley	27
3	(West Germany) Ernst Furtmayr	26
4=	(West Germany) Peter Linder	24
4=	(Germany) Peter Nöcker	24
4=	(Sweden) Björn Rothstein	24
4=	(Sweden) Tom Trana	24

- Note: Only the top five positions are included in this set of standings.

Championship points were awarded for the first seven places in each race in the order of 12-10-8-7-5-6-4.
