= 1963 British Formula Three season =

Seasons
- ← 1962 1964 →

The 1963 British Formula Junior season was the fourth and last season of the British Formula Junior motor racing. It featured the B.A.R.C. Express & Star British Championship which was won by Peter Arundell by just one point.

The 1963 season included only one championship, rather than the two held the previous season. The category was replaced by Formula Three in 1964.

== B.A.R.C. Express & Star British Championship ==
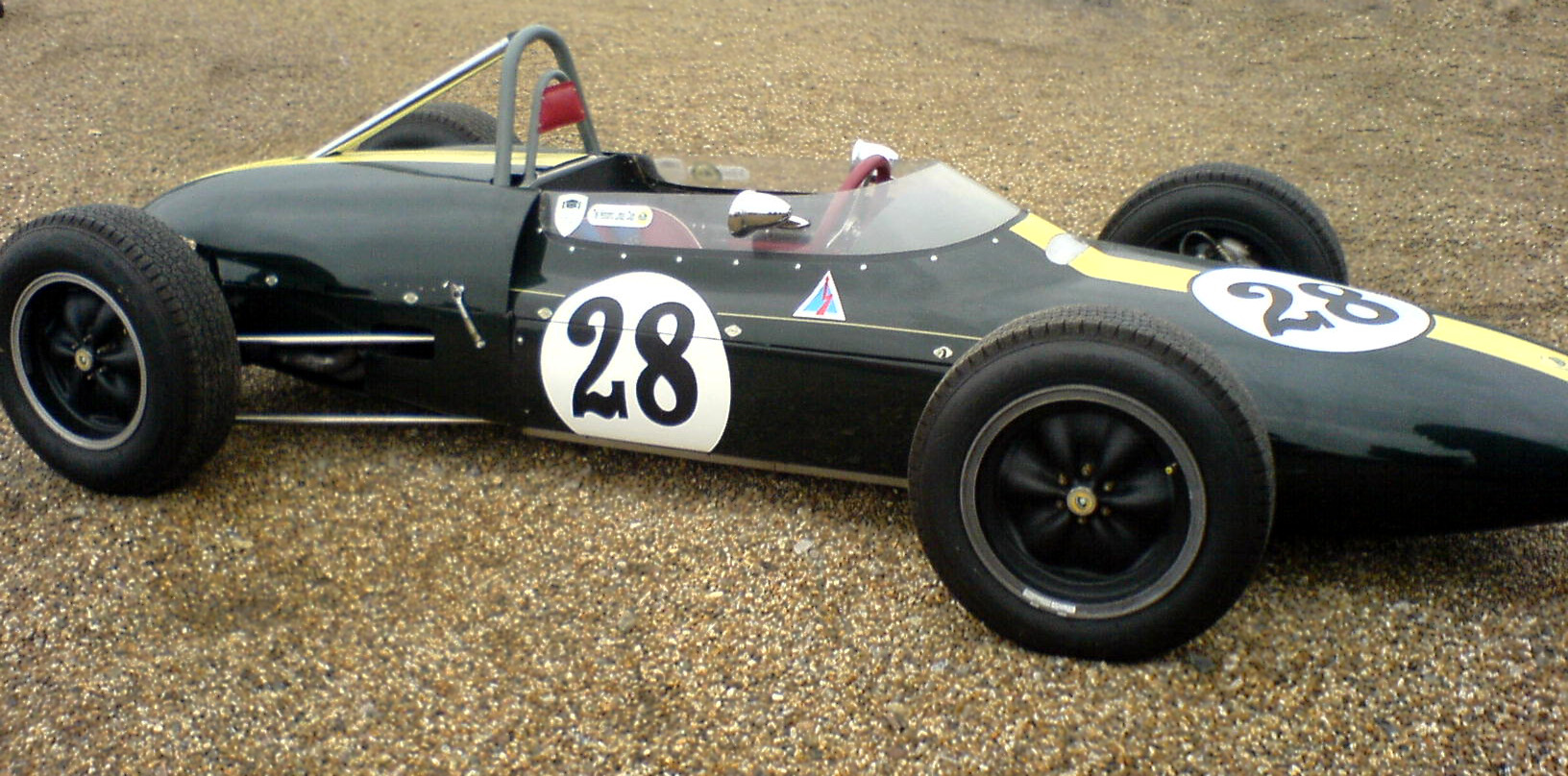
Peter Arundell won the championship driving a Lotus 27, similar to the example pictured above

Champion: (United Kingdom) Peter Arundell

Runner Up: (New Zealand) Denny Hulme

=== Results ===
Date	Round	Circuit	Winning driver	Winning team	Winning car
16/03	Rd. 1	(United Kingdom) Oulton Park	(United Kingdom) Alan Rollinson	Anglo-Scottish Racing Team	Cooper-Ford T59
06/04	Rd. 2	(United Kingdom) Oulton Park	(United Kingdom) Peter Arundell	Ron Harris – Team Lotus	Lotus-Ford 27
15/04	Rd. 3	(United Kingdom) Goodwood	(Australia) Frank Gardner	Ian Walker Racing	Brabham-Ford BT6
27/04	Rd. 4	(United Kingdom) Aintree	(New Zealand) Denny Hulme	Brabham Racing Organisation	Brabham-Ford BT6
11/05	Rd. 5	(United Kingdom) Silverstone	(New Zealand) Denny Hulme	Brabham Racing Organisation	Brabham-Ford BT6
18/05	Rd. 6	(United Kingdom) Goodwood	(United Kingdom) David Prophet	David Prophet Racing	Brabham-Ford BT6
25/05	Rd. 7	(United Kingdom) AIntree	(New Zealand) Denny Hulme	Brabham Racing Organisation	Brabham-Ford BT6
02/06	Rd. 8	(United Kingdom) Mallory Park	(United Kingdom) Peter Arundell	Ron Harris – Team Lotus	Lotus-Ford 27
03/06	Rd. 9	(United Kingdom) Crystal Palace	(New Zealand) Denny Hulme	Brabham Racing Organisation	Brabham-Ford BT6
08/06	Rd. 10	(United Kingdom) Aintree	(United Kingdom) Roy James	Roy James	Brabham-Ford BT6
06/07	Rd. 11	(United Kingdom) Silverstone	(Australia) Frank Gardner	Ian Walker Racing	Brabham-Ford BT6
20/07	Rd. 12	(United Kingdom) Silverstone	(United Kingdom) Peter Arundell	Ron Harris – Team Lotus	Lotus-Ford 27
05/08	Rd. 13	(United Kingdom) Mallory Park	(United Kingdom) John Taylor	Anglo-Scottish Racing Team	Cooper-Ford T67
17/08	Rd. 14	(United Kingdom) Mallory Park	(United Kingdom) Brian Hart	Cosworth Engineering Ltd	Lotus-Ford 22
24/08	Rd. 15	(United Kingdom) Goodwood	(United Kingdom) Peter Arundell	Ron Harris – Team Lotus	Lotus-Ford 27
25/08	Rd. 16	(United Kingdom) Snetterton	(United Kingdom) David Baker	Midland Racing Partnership	Lola-Ford Mk 5A
31/08	Rd. 17	(United Kingdom) Oulton Park	(United Kingdom) Alan Rees	Roy Winkelmann Racing	Lola-Ford Mk 5A
07/09	Rd. 18	(United Kingdom) Crystal Palace	(United States) Roy Pike	George Henrotte	Gemini-Ford Mk 4A
14/09	Rd. 19	(United Kingdom) Brands Hatch	(United Kingdom) Peter Arundell	Ron Harris – Team Lotus	Lotus-Ford 27
28/09	Rd. 20	(United Kingdom) Snetterton	(New Zealand) Denny Hulme	Brabham Racing Organisation	Brabham-Ford BT6
06/10	Rd. 21	(United Kingdom) Brands Hatch	(United Kingdom) Mike Costin	Cosworth Engineering Ltd	Lotus-Ford 22
13/10	Rd. 22	(United Kingdom) Mallory Park	(United Kingdom) John Taylor	Gerard Racing	Cooper-Ford T67

=== Table ===
Place	Driver	Entrant	Car	Total
1	(United Kingdom) Peter Arundell	Ron Harris – Team Lotus	Lotus-Ford 27	40
2	(New Zealand) Denny Hulme	Brabham Racing Organisation	Brabham-Ford BT6	39
3	(Australia) Frank Gardner	Ian Walker Racing	Brabham-Ford BT6	25
4=	(United Kingdom) Richard Attwood	Midland Racing Partnership	Lola-Ford MK 5A	22
4=	(United Kingdom) David Hobbs	Midland Racing Partnership	Lola-Ford MK 5A	22
6	(Australia) Paul Hawkins	Ian Walker Racing	Brabham-Ford BT6	13
7=	(United Kingdom) Bill Bradley	Midland Racing Partnership	Lola-Ford MK 5A	8
7=	(United Kingdom) Mike Spence	Ron Harris – Team Lotus	Lotus-Ford 27	8
9	(United Kingdom) John Fenning	Ron Harris – Team Lotus	Lotus-Ford 27	5
10	(United Kingdom) Alan Rees	Roy Winklemann Racing	Cooper-Ford T67; Lola-Ford Mk 5A	4
11=	(United Kingdom) Peter Procter	Tyrrell Racing Organisation	Cooper-BMC T67	2
11=	(United Kingdom) John Rhodes	Tyrrell Racing Organisation	Cooper-BMC T67	2
13=	(New Zealand) Ross Greenville	Trophy Westmount – Team Gemini	Gemini-Ford Mk 4A	1
13=	(United Kingdom) John Taylor	Anglo-Scottish Racing Team	Cooper-Ford T59	1
13=	(United Kingdom) Brian Hart	Cosworth Engineering Ltd	Lotus-Ford 22	1
13=	(United States) Tim Mayer	Tyrrell Racing Organisation	Cooper-BMC T67	1
