= 1963 European Touring Car Challenge =

Seasons
- ← 1962 1964 →

The 1963 European Touring Car Challenge was the inaugural season of what would become the European Touring Car Championship. On 16 June 1963, the first race was staged on the classic Nürburgring Nordschleife circuit. After a hillclimb event at Mont Ventoux, the challenge headed to England for two races, as classes were divided between events at Brands Hatch and Mallory Park. Round five was hosted by the brand new Zolder circuit, then the challenge crossed the border into the Netherlands and on to Zandvoort. Another hillclimb at the Timmelsjoch for round seven, and the final would be held behind the Iron Curtain, in Hungary.

Although the challenge was a success, the point-scoring systems used weren't. The first challenge left us with five drivers sharing the top position, with Peter Nöcker, being declared the champion. This was because there were up to nine classes, all having their own separate race winners. This point system would remain right up to 1988 when the ETCC stopped.

The challenge had a lot of competitive cars, but not many of them were in the same class. On the other hand, speed differences were not that large, so a Mini was sometimes able to outpace many bigger cars.

== European Touring Car Challenge ==
Champion: (Germany) Peter Nöcker

Runner Up: (Germany) Wolf-Dieter Mantzel

=== Results ===
| Date | Round | Circuit/Hillclimb | Classes | Winning driver(s) | Winning team | Winning car |
| 16/06 | Rd. 1 | (West Germany) Nürburgring | Class 1-9 | (West Germany) Peter Lindner (West Germany) Peter Nöcker | Peter Lindner Racing | Jaguar 3.8 Litre Mark 2 |
| 23/06 | Rd. 2 | (France) Mont Ventoux | Class 2-9 | (Italy) Leo Cella | Driver | Lancia Flavia Coupé |
| 06/07 | Rd. 3 | (United Kingdom) Brands Hatch | Class 4-9 | (United Kingdom) Roy Salvadori (New Zealand) Denny Hulme | Tommy Atkins | Jaguar 3.8 Litre Mark 2 |
| 13/07 | Rd. 4 | (United Kingdom) Mallory Park | Class 2-3 | (Sweden) Björn Rothstein | Driver | Saab 96 Sport |
| 25/08 | Rd. 5 | (Belgium) Zolder | Class 2-3 | (Sweden) Gösta Karlsson | Gösta Karlsson | Saab 96 Sport |
| 25/08 | Rd. 5 | (Belgium) Zolder | Class 4-5 | (Netherlands) Rob Slotemaker | Downton Engineering | Austin Mini Cooper S |
| 25/08 | Rd. 5 | (Belgium) Zolder | Class 6-9 | (West Germany) Peter Nöcker | | Jaguar 3.8 Litre Mark 2 |
| 01/09 | Rd. 6 | (Netherlands) Zandvoort | Class 1-3 | (Sweden) Gösta Karlsson | Driver | Saab 96 Sport |
| 01/09 | Rd. 6 | (Netherlands) Zandvoort | Class 4-6 | (Netherlands) Rob Slotemaker | Downton Engineering | Austin Mini Cooper S |
| 01/09 | Rd. 6 | (Netherlands) Zandvoort | Class 7-9 | (United Kingdom) John Sparrow | John Sparrow | Jaguar 3.8 Litre Mark 2 |
| 15/09 | Rd. 7 | (Austria) Timmelsjoch | Class 2-9 | (West Germany) Peter Nöcker | | Jaguar 3.8 Litre Mark 2 |
| 22/09 | Rd. 8 | (Hungary) Népliget Park, Budapest | Class 2-9 | (Italy) Luigi Cabella (Italy) Carlo Facetti | HF Squadra Corse | Lancia Flaminia |

=== Table ===
| Place | Driver | Car | Total |
|---|---|---|---|
| 1 | (Germany) Peter Nöcker | Jaguar 3.8 Litre Mark 2 | 60 |
| 2 | (Germany) Wolf-Dieter Mantzel | DKW F12 | 60 |
| 3 | (Germany) Hubert Hahne | BMW 700 | 60 |
| 4 | (Netherlands) Rob Slotemaker | Austin Mini Cooper S BMW 700 | 60 |
| 5 | (Sweden) Tom Trana | Volvo 122S | 60 |
| 6 | (Sweden) Gösta Karlsson | Saab 96 Sport | 58 |
| 7 | (Sweden) Björn Rothstein | Saab 96 Sport | 56 |
| 8= | (Italy) Luigi Cabella | Lancia Flaminia | 54 |
| 8= | (Italy) Leo Cella | Lancia Flaminia | 54 |
| 8= | (Germany) Jochen Neerpasch | Volvo 122S | 54 |
| 8= | (Germany) Jürgen Grähser | BMW 700 | 54 |
| 8= | (United Kingdom) John Aley | Austin Mini Cooper S Morris Mini 850 | 54 |
| 13 | (Germany) Ernst Furtmayr | Alfa Romeo Giulia TI | 52 |
| 14 | (United Kingdom) John Thurston | Morris Mini Cooper S DKW Junior de Luxe; Morris Mini 850 | 47 |
| 15 | (Germany) Hans Braun | NSU Sport Prinz | 46 |
| 16 | (Netherlands) Loek Nerden | Austin Mini Cooper | 43 |
| 17 | (United Kingdom) Bill Blydenstein | Vauxhall VX4/90 | 41 |
| 18 | (Netherlands) Leo Hans von Veh | BMW 700 | 40 |
etc.

The first five drivers finished level on points; the overall result of the Nürburgring was decisive... another contemporary report mentions "the ones with the most victories, Nöcker, Mantzel and Hahne were classified in the order of who had the biggest winner margin over second in class".
