= T56 =

T56 or T-56 may refer to:

- Allison T56, a turboprop aircraft engine
- Borg-Warner T-56 transmission, an automotive transmission
- Cooper T56, a British racing car
- Type 56 assault rifle, a Chinese assault rifle
- Utility Vehicle, Tracked, Infantry, T56, an American armored personnel carrier prototype
- Type 56 armored personnel carrier, a Chinese armored personnel carrier derived from the BTR-152
