= Denny Hulme =

New Zealand racing driver (1936–1992)

Denny Hulme OBE
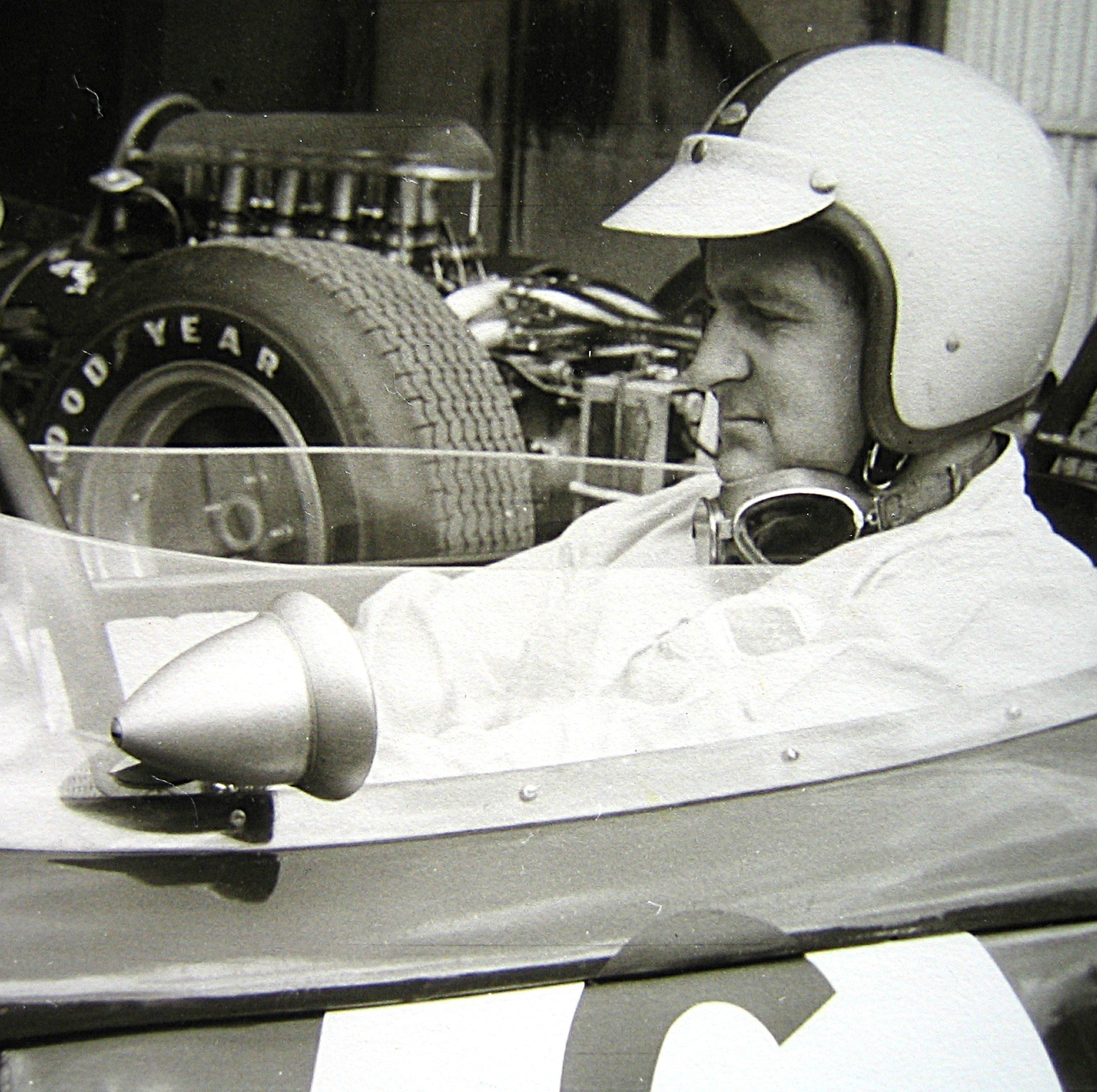
- Hulme at the 1965 German Grand Prix
- Born: Denis Clive Hulme; 18 June 1936; Motueka, New Zealand
- Died: 4 October 1992 (aged 56); Bathurst, New South Wales, Australia
- Spouse: Greeta Main (m. 1963)
- Children: 2
- Parent: Clive Hulme (father)

Formula One World Championship career
- Nationality: (New Zealand) New Zealander
- Active years: 1965–1974
- Team(s): Brabham, McLaren
- Entries: 112
- Championships: 1 (1967)
- Wins: 8
- Podiums: 33
- Career points: 248
- Pole positions: 1
- Fastest laps: 9
- First entry: 1965 Monaco Grand Prix
- First win: 1967 Monaco Grand Prix
- Last win: 1974 Argentine Grand Prix
- Last entry: 1974 United States Grand Prix

Denis Clive Hulme (18 June 1936 – 4 October 1992) was a New Zealand racing driver, who competed in Formula One from 1965 to 1974. Nicknamed "the Bear", (Note: Hulme was nicknamed the Bear for his "gruff nature" and "rugged features".) Hulme won the Formula One World Drivers' Championship in 1967 with Brabham, becoming the only New Zealander to do so, and won eight Grands Prix across 10 seasons. He is the World Champion with the fewest pole positions in his career, with only 1 career pole at the 1973 South African Grand Prix.

Born and raised in the South Island, Hulme was the son of Clive Hulme, who was a World War II sniper. Hulme achieved eight race wins, one pole position, nine fastest laps and 33 podiums in Formula One. He also finished third in the overall standing in 1968 and 1972.

Hulme showed versatility by dominating the Canadian-American Challenge Cup (Can-Am) for Group 7 sports cars. As a member of the McLaren team that won five straight titles between 1967 and 1971, he won the individual Drivers' Championship twice and was runner-up on four other occasions.

Hulme was nicknamed 'The Bear', because of his "gruff nature" and "rugged features"; however, he was also "sensitive (...) unable to express his feelings, except in a racing car". During the early part of his career, Hulme preferred to race bare foot as he believed that it gave him a better feel of the throttle. This changed in 1960 when he started competing in the more highly regulated European championships. Following his Formula One tenure with Brabham, Hulme raced for McLaren in multiple formats—Formula One, Can-Am, and at the Indianapolis 500. Hulme retired from Formula One at the end of the 1974 season but continued to race Australian Touring Cars.

Hulme died after suffering a heart attack behind the wheel during the 1992 Tooheys 1000.

== Early racing career ==
Hulme was born on a tobacco farm belonging to his parents in Motueka in the South Island of New Zealand. His father Clive Hulme was awarded a Victoria Cross, as a sniper, while fighting in the Battle of Crete in 1941.

While growing up on his family's farm in Pongakawa (near Te Puke), Hulme learned to drive a truck while sitting on his father's lap; by the age of six, he was driving solo. He left school and went to work in a garage. He saved up enough money to buy an MG TF, promptly entering this in hillclimbing events. After that his father brought an MGA for him. After making impressive progress he purchased a F2 Cooper-Climax, subsequently being chosen for the New Zealand Driver to Europe program, along with fellow New Zealander, George Lawton. The pair of young New Zealanders began competing in Formula Junior and Formula Two across Europe, in a Cooper-BMC and Cooper–Ford respectively. Hulme won the 1960 Gran Premio di Pescara for Formula Juniors, but the newspapers back in New Zealand made no mention of this, as they wrote only about Bruce McLaren. However, the year, 1960 ended in disaster, when Lawton crashed during a race at Roskilde (Denmark) dying in Hulme's arms.

As the New Zealand press were ignoring Hulme, he hired a 2½ litre Cooper from Reg Parnell and entered it in the 1961 New Zealand Gold Star Championship. He won the title straight away. He appeared at Le Mans for the Abarth team, taking a class win in S850 the class (partnered by fellow New Zealander Angus Hyslop), before Ken Tyrrell invited the likable (but sometimes gruff) New Zealander to race in his Formula Junior and Formula Two team, in 1962, when Tony Maggs was unavailable due to his Formula One commitments.

Once there, basing himself in London, Hulme worked as a mechanic in Jack Brabham's garage in Chessington and began to pave his way on his motor-racing path. It was Brabham who gave him drives in his Brabham sportscars and single seaters. During the 1963 season, he won seven International Formula Junior and after some impressive performances there, it was his old boss Jack Brabham who gave Hulme the call and he joined the Australian legend's F2 team. In 1964, the pair set about dominating the Championship that year, resulting in a one–two finish in the FFSA Trophées de France series. The pair also finished one–two in the 1966 series. During this spell in F2 between 1964 and 1966, Hulme won three races in the series, plus two non-championship events (the 1964 Grote Prijs van Limborg and the 1965 Spring Trophy). Hulme was rewarded with some non-championship Formula One races.

Away from single seaters, Hulme also raced the occasional saloon car. In appalling conditions, on 6 July 1963, Hulme won his first major saloon car race. The second Motor-sponsored Six-Hour, a round of the European Touring Car Championship, saw the pre-race favourite, a 7-litre Ford Galaxie driven by Dan Gurney and Jack Brabham flounder in the wet and the Jaguars dominated the race. Hulme would win, partnered by Roy Salvadori, after the top finishers were disqualified for engine irregularities.

== Formula One career ==
=== 1965–1967: With Brabham ===
After making numerous appearances in non-championship events for Brabham during the 1964 season, as the Brabham team had signed Dan Gurney to race alongside their boss, Hulme finally got the call he had been waiting for, making his World Championship debut in 1965 at Monaco. Later that year, he scored his first points, for fourth position at the daunting Clermont-Ferrand (Charade) circuit in France.

1966 was Hulme's first full season of Formula One. Now, after the departure of Dan Gurney, he was the outright number two at the Brabham team behind Jack himself. Finishing a fine fourth that year (with Jack winning the Drivers' and the Brabham team the Constructors' Championship), the highlights came with a third place at Reims in France, a second behind Brabham at Brands Hatch, and the fastest lap at Zandvoort, before ignition problems put paid to his race there. Whilst his boss won the World title, Hulme made it to the podium four times during season, finishing fourth overall in the standings.

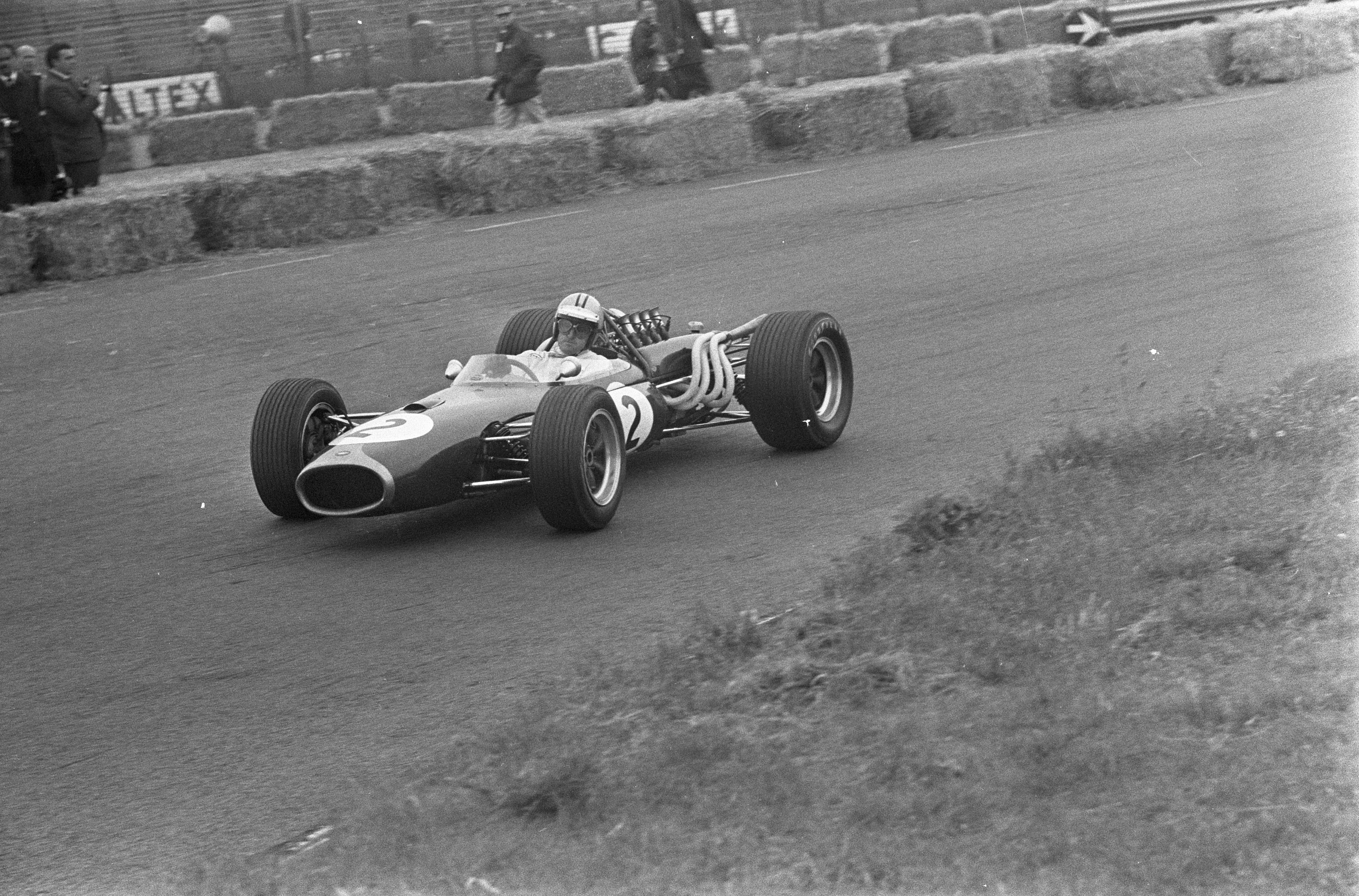
Hulme during qualifying for the 1967 Dutch Grand Prix

The 1967 Championship was essentially an internal affair within the Brabham Racing Organisation team for most of the year, but the new Lotus 49 gave Jim Clark and Graham Hill the opportunity to bite back. Their Brabham-Repcos were not the fastest cars, however they were reliable and consistent, as were Brabham and Hulme. During the season, he would take two wins in the 11-race Championship, at Monte Carlo and the ferocious Nürburgring (the Green Hell).

Although Hulme silenced many critics with his excellent win in Monaco, the race was marred by the appalling accident that would claim the life of Lorenzo Bandini, who was chasing Hulme at the time of the crash. His second Grand Prix win of 1967, was on the legendary Nordschleife of the Nürburgring. This victory proved his versatility on any type of track. A further six visits to the podium gave Hulme the advantage he needed. He won the Championship by five points from Brabham, and a further five from Jim Clark. Hulme was the first (and to date, only) Formula One World Champion from New Zealand.

=== 1968–1974: With McLaren ===
1968 saw a move to the McLaren team, owned by fellow New Zealander Bruce McLaren. Although the 'Bruce and Denny Show' dominated the North American Can-Am sports car series from 1966, their time in Formula One was less successful. The South African race, held at the legendary Kyalami circuit, proved difficult for the team. Despite having to use the old BRM V12 engines on an old M5A chassis, Hulme brought it home a creditable fifth.

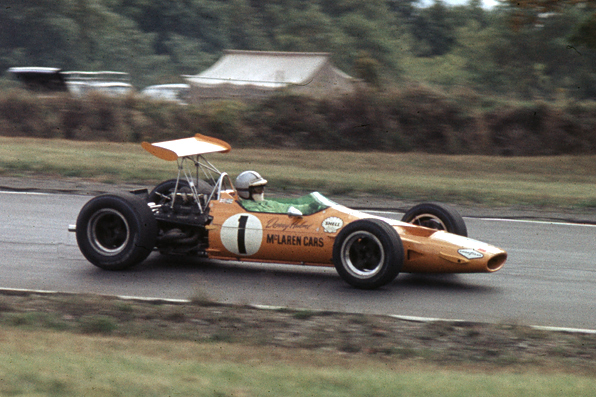
1968 USGP at Watkins Glen. Photo by Bob Sanderson

By the Spanish round at Jarama, the Cosworth DFV V8 engine was installed in the brand new M7A chassis and the performances improved. After victory in the BRDC International Trophy, Hulme picked up second place in Spain, before taking two more wins that year at Monza and in Canada, leaving him with an outside chance of retaining the Championship crown against Graham Hill and the young Jackie Stewart.

The finale, in Mexico City, determined the champion that year, but Hulme suffered a suspension failure on his McLaren.

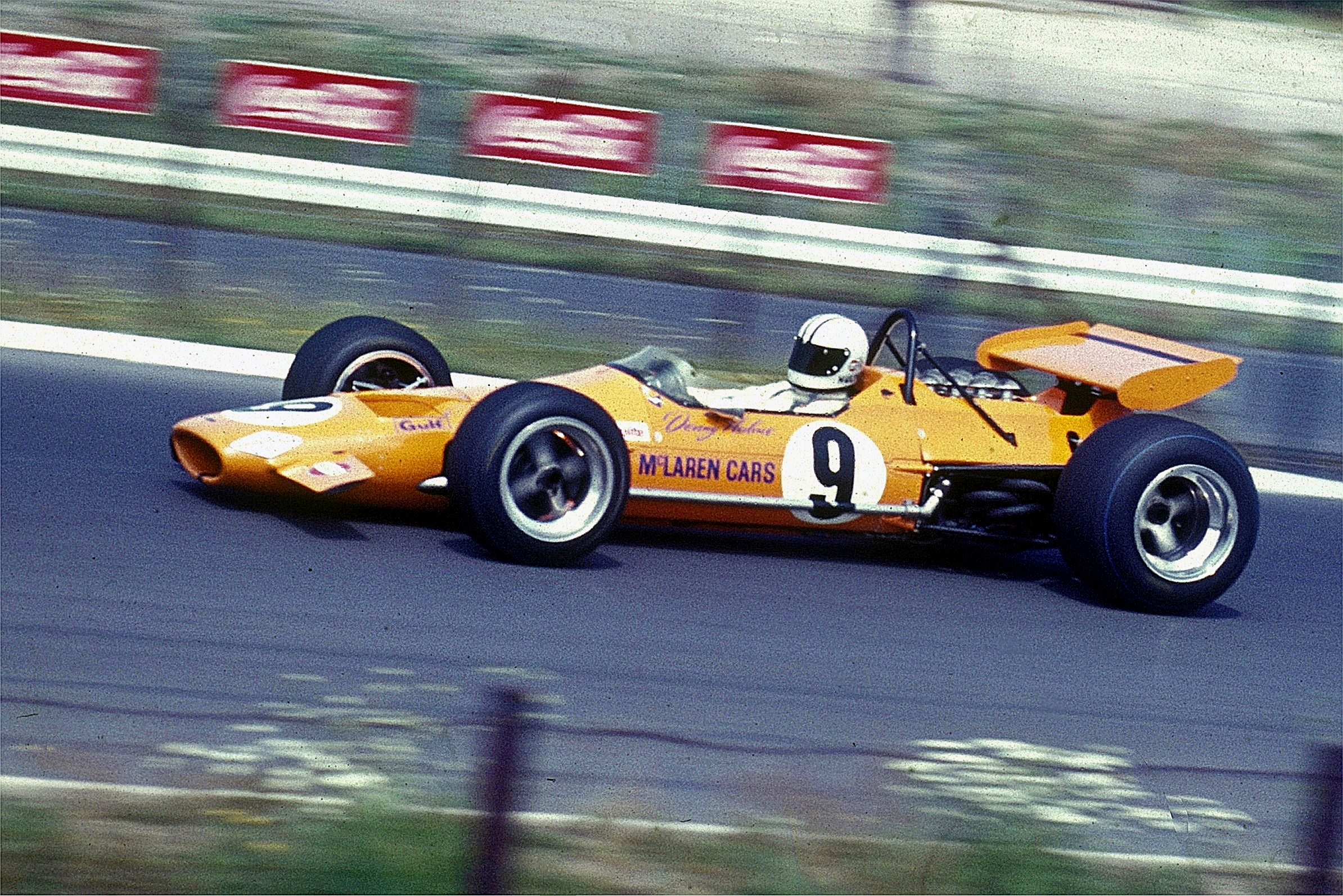
1969 German GP on the Nordschleife

1969 was a disaster for Hulme: the revised M7A chassis struggled with reliability and Hulme managed only 20 points, attaining one victory, at the final round at the Mexican Grand Prix. Hulme ended the season in sixth position in the drivers' standings.

1970 brought a new decade, but Hulme's luck did not change. Team boss and friend Bruce McLaren was killed while testing the CanAm McLaren M8D, which affected Hulme. Another problem occurred that year when he suffered burns to his hands from a methanol fire during practice for the Indianapolis 500. As a result, he missed the Dutch Grand Prix in 1970. Undeterred, he felt he owed it to Bruce and the McLaren team to continue racing. Besides his emotional distress and serious burns, he still managed a creditable fourth in the championship with 27 points.

Although Hulme would claim third place in the 1970 Mexican Grand Prix, the race was marred by the immense crowd of over 200,000. The crowd proved almost uncontrollable and almost forced the cancellation of the race. They were crammed in front of the guard-rails, sat at the trackside and ran across the track itself. The drivers were concerned that someone would be killed. During qualifying, Hulme missed some children by inches. They were playing a game of chicken to see who got nearest to the cars as they hurtled past.

1971 started promisingly. At Kyalami, he led dominantly but the rising-rate suspension system forced him out, after only a few laps. The McLaren team were in disarray. The season was even worse than 1970 results wise, as Hulme did not even make the podium, although he set the fastest laps in Canada and the United States that year but results were hard to come by. Hulme ended up ninth in the standings for 1971.

Beauty, fragrance and men's products company Yardley took over title sponsorship of a new McLaren in 1972, and it paid dividends for Hulme. Partnered with good friend Peter Revson, Hulme was back on winning ways taking victory in South Africa, and a few fine podiums elsewhere, finishing 1972 in third place with 39 points. Meanwhile, Hulme also won the non-championship International Gold Cup race at Oulton Park.

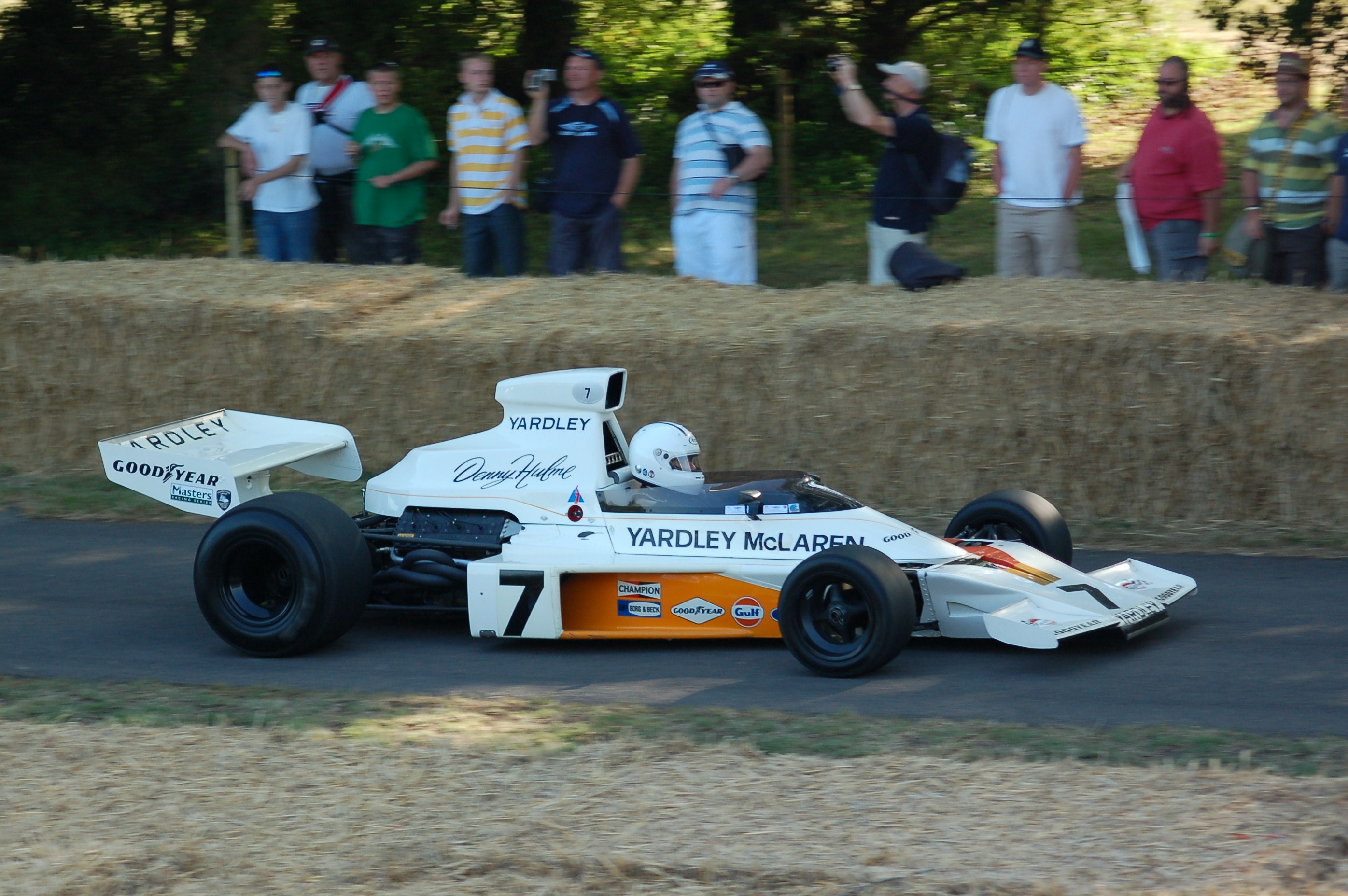
Hulme's 1973 McLaren-Ford M23 being demonstrated at the Goodwood Festival of Speed

Amazingly, Hulme scored only one pole position in his F1 career aboard a McLaren M23, in 1973 at Kyalami—he appeared to have a good relationship with the South African venue. However, Hulme was outshone by friend and teammate Peter Revson in 1973, and he finished a place down on the American in sixth, 12 points adrift.

By the 1973 Belgian Grand Prix, Hulme and McLaren had taken F1 safety forward, when his car introduced the Graviner life-support system to Formula One, supplying the driver breathable air in the event of fire.

Hulme won the Swedish Grand Prix luckily, though he also set the fastest lap. The race seemed to be set up for a home victory for Ronnie Peterson, with his Lotus teammate, Emerson Fittipaldi in second, when the Lotuses hit trouble. Fittipaldi being slowed with gearbox issues, and then Peterson with a slow rear wheel puncture. As Hulme decided to run with harder tyres, he passed Peterson on the penultimate lap to win. Hulme expressed sadness to "have taken that away from Ronnie".

He and Revson had built up a strong friendship off the back of their F1 camaraderie they also competed together in the Can-Am series. When Revson left McLaren at the end of 1973 to join Shadow, Hulme would have been disappointed.

In his time at McLaren, Hulme won six Grand Prix's, but he was nearing the end of his time in F1, and his competitive urges were being blunted by a growing apprehension about the dangers of racing. After the Brazilian Grand Prix in which Hulme finished twelfth, these fears were well founded. When testing at Kyalami started, in March 1974, Peter Revson suffered a front suspension failure (broken front Ball Joint), veering head-on into the barriers. Hulme tried in vain to save his friend's life, but to no avail. After the accident Hulme announced that he would see out 1974 before retiring from Grand Prix racing. However, other than winning the Argentine event (he inherited the lead when his now teammate Fittipaldi inadvertently knocked-off the electrical "kill-switch" on his steering wheel, on the penultimate lap) and coming second in Austria, he did not make much of an impact on the season, and retired at the end of the year and stepped away from the sport and returned to New Zealand.

== Away from F1 ==
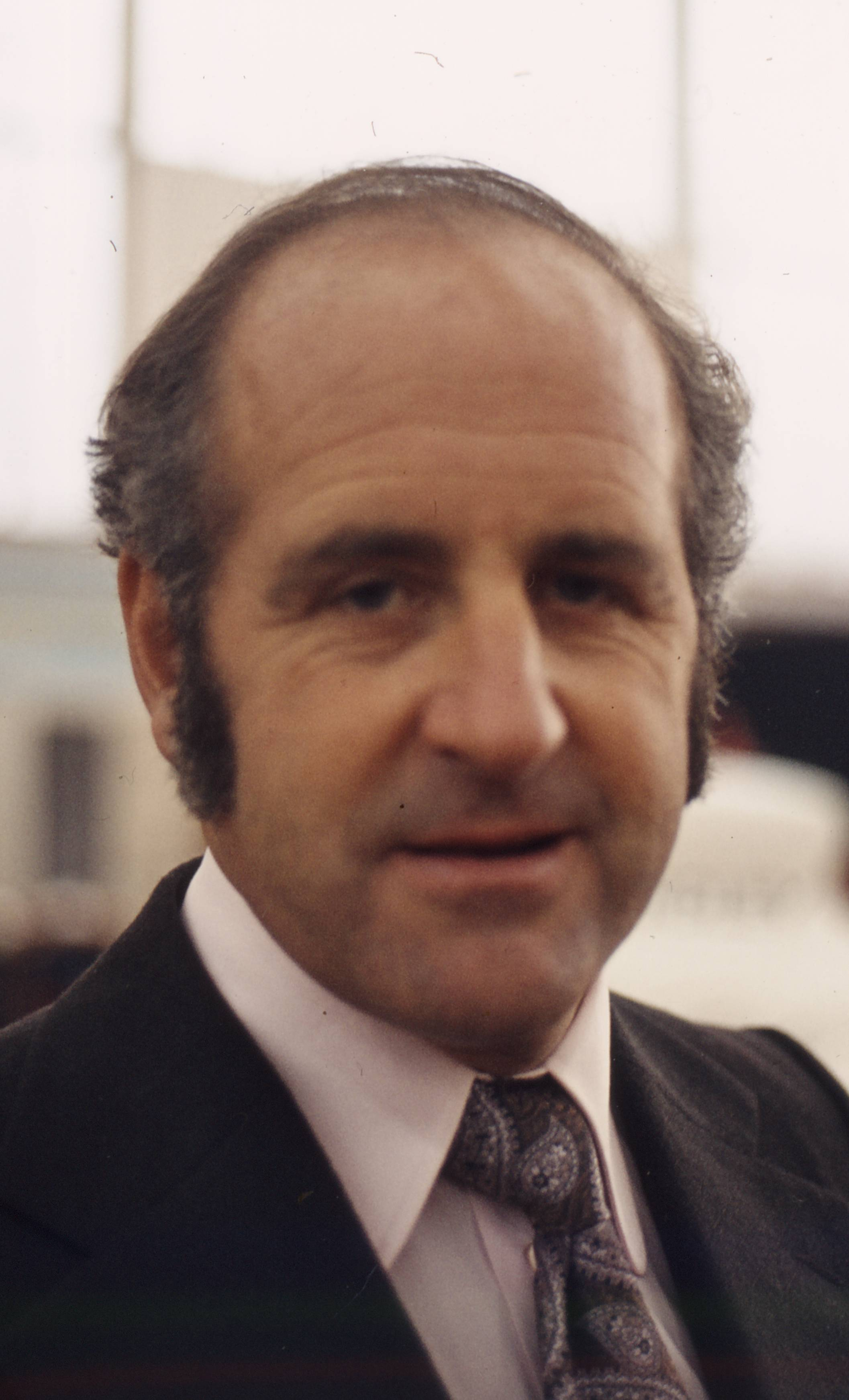
Hulme in 1973

=== 1966 Le Mans 24 hours ===
At the finish of the 1966 Le Mans 24 hours, the two Shelby-American Inc. entered Ford GT40 MK II's were both on the lead lap, running first and second, with the car Hulme was partnering with Ken Miles in the lead. In the lead half-hour of the race, the Fords bunched up together in a pre-arranged plan for Bruce McLaren and Miles to cross the line, headlights ablaze, in a dead-heat. Unfortunately the dead-heat that Henry Ford II had so proudly planned did not come off, as the timekeepers decided that a dead-heat was technically impossible as the Hulme/Miles car had qualified faster than the McLaren/Amon car, and therefore covered a shorter race distance. Therefore, when the two cars arrived side by side at the finish, Bruce McLaren and Chris Amon were classified as the winners, with Hulme and Ken Miles in second.

=== Can-Am (1966–1972) ===
In 1966, while driving for the Brabham team in Formula One, Hulme drove in the inaugural season of the Can-Am racing series of FIA Group 7 racing, driving the same Sid Taylor entered Lola T70 he had driven with success in UK Group 7 races that year, but achieving no success in the Can-Am races. In 1967, he joined the McLaren team of New Zealand countryman Bruce McLaren for the series, replacing Chris Amon who had gone to Ferrari. This partnership became so successful, the Americans called them the 'Bruce and Denny Show', such was their domination.

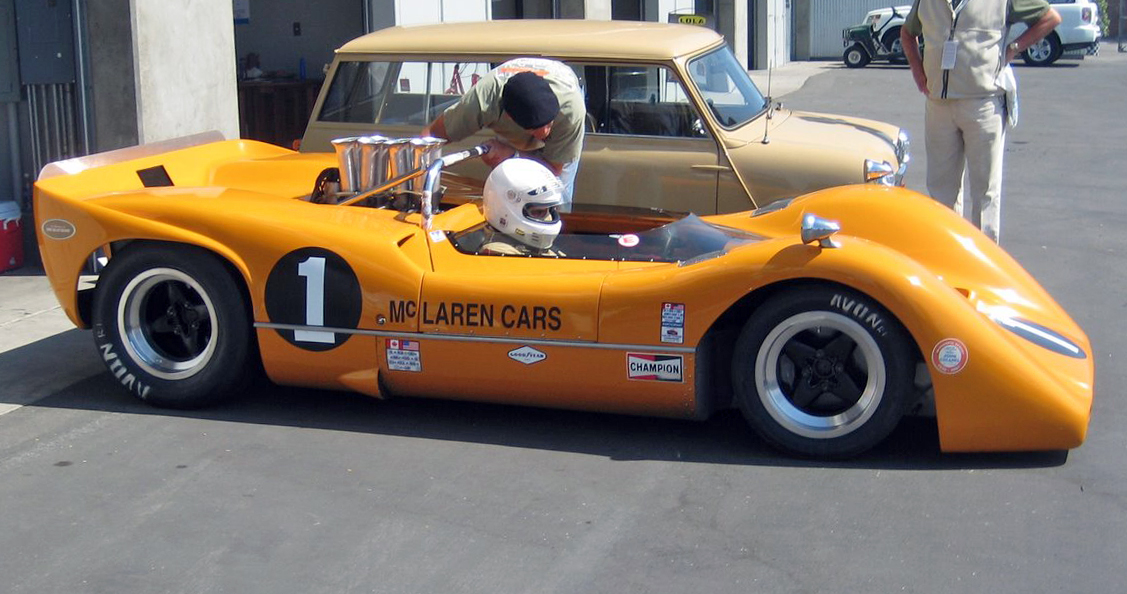
1968 McLaren M6B at the Laguna Seca Historics, 2009

In the 1967 season, the year of his F1 Championship win with Brabham, Hulme finished second to team leader Bruce McLaren for the Can-Am championship, scoring three wins in six races and earning 24 points in the McLaren M6A. Hulme won the Can-Am Championship in 1968, taking three victories in the six race season, earning 35 points in the McLaren M8A. 1969 saw the McLaren team continue to dominate the series; driving the McLaren M8B, they won every race, with multiple 1–2 finishes, and even a 1–2–3 finish when Dan Gurney drove the spare car. Hulme scored five victories in eleven races in 1969, earning 160 points to finish second to teammate McLaren in the championship.

The 1970 season was difficult for the team, as they mourned the loss of leader Bruce McLaren, who had died while pre-season testing the McLaren M8D "Batmobile" at the Goodwood Circuit. Teamed first with driver Dan Gurney, then with driver Peter Gethin, Hulme led the team with six wins in ten races, winning his second Can-Am Championship driving the M8D to 132 points—more than double the number of the second-place competitor. For the 1971 season Hulme's teammate was his good friend Peter Revson, who took the Can-Am crown that year with Hulme in second (three wins in ten races), driving the McLaren M8F. In his final season, Hulme drove the McLaren M20 to second place in the 1972 championship on 65 points, with two wins in the nine race season.

Following his quiet start in the 1966 season, Hulme scored 22 wins with 11 second place and two third-place finishes in 52 Can-Am races from 1967 through 1972 – standing on the podium for 67% of the races during those six seasons. In those same six seasons, he was the Can-Am season champion twice, and championship runner-up four times. His 22 career wins are the most by any driver in the Can-Am series.

=== Indy 500 ===
Hulme competed in the Indianapolis 500 on four occasions: 1967, 1968, 1969, and 1971. His best results in the event were in 1967 and 1968, both times finishing fourth. He did not compete in the 1970 race, due to methanol burns to the hands after a fire during practice. Hulme was named the 1967 Indianapolis 500 Rookie of the Year.

=== Tasman Series ===
Hulme finished third in the 1964 Tasman Series with one win and three podiums. He would later compete in 1967 and 1968, collecting a podium in each year.

=== British Sportscar Championship (1965–1969) ===
On weekends away from the Formula One, Hulme would sometimes race for Sid Taylor Racing in the British Sportscar Championship. During this time, he won a total of 12 races, mostly in a Lola T70, including three RAC Tourist Trophies, one of which was a round of the 1965 World Sportscar Championship.

== After F1 ==
After leaving the sport, Hulme led the GPDA (Grand Prix Drivers' Association) for a brief period, but the cut and thrust nature of the post was ill-suited to his gentlemanly nature and he did not fill the post for very long. He then retired to New Zealand, returning to touring cars to race occasionally in the Benson & Hedges 500 race at Pukekohe Park Raceway in the late 1970s first in Chrysler Chargers then later a Volkswagen Golf, partnering Stirling Moss on occasion for the 500 kilometre endurance format.

Hulme began racing regularly again in 1982 with amateur racer Ray Smith, building up a team with the Holden Commodore V8 capable of winning the New Zealand Production Car Series for Group A touring cars in 1983–84. Hulme also started racing in Australia, racing in the team of former European compatriot Frank Gardner's JPS Team BMW, which included second in class at the 1984 Bathurst 1000.

Hulme returned to Europe in 1986 racing in the European Touring Car Championship in a Tom Walkinshaw Racing prepared Rover Vitesse. That campaign culminated in a victory in the RAC Tourist Trophy, Hulme's fourth win in the event, 18 years after his third win. After that Hulme raced briefly for Bob Jane's Mercedes-Benz team before linking up with Larry Perkins in 1987, moving with Perkins in 1988 to the newly formed Holden Racing Team. It was with Holden, that Hulme would record his last visit to a podium, when he finished second, in the 1988 South Australia Cup. Hulme would later join Benson & Hedges Racing, another team run by Frank Gardner in 1990. In the meantime, Hulme was a keen enthusiast of truck racing, which became popular in New Zealand in the early 1990s running Scania trucks, returning to Europe to race in European Truck Championship.

== Death ==
A favourite event of Hulme's was the Bathurst 1000, held at the Mount Panorama track in Australia. In the 1992 event he was driving a semi-works supported BMW M3 for Benson & Hedges Racing when, after complaining over the car-to-pits radio of blurred vision, originally thought to be because of the heavy rain, Hulme suffered a massive heart attack at the wheel whilst driving along the high-speed Conrod Straight. After veering into the wall on the left side of the track at about 140 mph (230 km/h), he managed to bring the car to a relatively controlled stop sliding against the safety railing and concrete wall on the right side of the track. When marshals reached the scene, they found Hulme still strapped in. He was taken from the car straight to Bathurst Hospital where he was officially pronounced dead.

According to his sister Anita, Hulme's health began deteriorating after the death of his 21-year-old son, Martin Clive, on Christmas Day, 1988, at Lake Rotoiti in the Bay of Plenty. "He was so upset after Martin’s death", says Anita. "He used to go and sit in the cemetery. I know that he died of a broken heart".

=== Legacy ===
Several awards were named in Hulme's memory:

- The Denny Hulme Memorial Trophy awarded at the Targa Tasmania
- The NZ Motor Cup: Denny Hulme Memorial Trophy awarded during the Toyota Racing Series

Hulme was portrayed by Ben Collins in the 2019 film Ford v Ferrari.

== Honours and awards ==
- 1967 – New Zealand Sportsman of the Year.
- 1967/1970/1974 – Winner of the Hawthorn Memorial Trophy.
- 1992 – Appointed an Officer of the Order of the British Empire, for services to motorsport, in the 1992 Queen's Birthday Honours
- 1993 – Inducted into the New Zealand Sports Hall of Fame.
- 1994 – Inducted into the New Zealand Motorsports Wall of Fame.
- 1998 – Inducted into the Motorsports Hall of Fame of America.
- 2002 – Inducted into the International Motorsports Hall of Fame.

== Racing record ==
=== Career summary ===
Season	Series	Position	Car	Team
1960	Campionato A.N.P.E.C./Auto Italiana d'Europe	3rd	Envoy-Ford; Cooper-BMC T52	Envoy Racing Team; New Zealand International Grand Prix Team
1960	Formula 2 Drivers' & Constructors' Championship	NC	Cooper-Ford T45	New Zealand International Grand Prix Team
1960	B.R.S.C.C. John Davy Championship	NC	Cooper-BMC T52	Ken Tyrrell
1961	New Zealand Gold Star Championship	**1st**	**Cooper-Climax T51**	**Yeoman Credit Team**
1962	John Davy Championship	2nd	Cooper-Ford T56; Brabham-Ford BT2	New Zealand Grand Prix Racing Team; Brabham Racing
1962	B.A.R.C. Championship	NC	Cooper-Ford T56	New Zealand Grand Prix Racing Team
1962	B.R.S.C.C. Championship	NC	Cooper-Ford T56; Brabham-Ford BT2	New Zealand Grand Prix Racing Team; Brabham Racing
1962	British Saloon Car Championship	26th	Austin Mini Cooper S	Cooper Car Co.
1963	B.A.R.C. Express & Star British Championship	2nd	Brabham-Ford BT6	Brabham Racing Organisation
1963	Championnat de France	NC	Brabham-Ford BT6	Brabham Racing Organisation
1963	European Touring Car Challenge	NC	Jaguar 3.8 Mk II	Tommy Atkins
1963	British Saloon Car Championship	NC	Ford Galaxie	Alan Brown Racing Ltd
1964	Grote Prijs van Limborg	**1st**	Brabham-Cosworth BT10	Brabham Racing Developments
1964	FFSA Trophées de France	2nd	Brabham-Cosworth BT10	Brabham Racing Organisation
1964	Tasman Cup Series	3rd	Brabham-Climax BT4	Brabham Racing Organisation; Ecurie Vitesse
1964	Autocar British Formula Two Championship	4th	Brabham-Cosworth BT10	Brabham Racing Developments
1964	Australian Formula One Championship	NC	Brabham-Climax BT4	Ecurie Vitesse
1964	European Touring Car Challenge	NC	Ford Galaxie	Alan Brown Racing Ltd
1964	British Saloon Car Championship	NC	Ford Galaxie; Austin Mini Cooper S	Alan Brown Racing Ltd; Don Moore
1964	Deutsche Rundstrecken-Meisterschaft für Grand-Tourisme-Wagen	13th (overall) **1st** in GT1.0 class	Honda S600	Jack Brabham
1965	Spring Trophy	**1st**	Brabham-Cosworth BT16	Brabham Racing Developments
1965	Trophées de France	8th	Brabham-Cosworth BT16	Brabham Racing Organisation
1965	FIA Formula One World Championship	11th	Brabham-Climax BT7; Brabham-Climax BT11	Brabham Racing Organisation
1965	British Sports Car Championship	NC	Brabham-Climax BT8	Sidney Taylor Racing
1966	Trophées de France	2nd	Brabham-Honda BT18	Brabham Racing Organisation
1966	FIA Formula One World Championship	4th	Brabham-Climax BT22; Brabham-Repco BT20	Brabham Racing Organisation
1966	Canadian-American Challenge Cup	NC	Lola-Chevrolet T70	Sidney Taylor Racing
1966	British Sports Car Championship	NC	Lola-Chevrolet T70	Sidney Taylor Racing
1967	FIA Formula One World Championship	**1st**	**Brabham-Repco BT20**; **Brabham-Repco BT19**; **Brabham-Repco BT24**	**Brabham Racing Organisation**
1967	Canadian-American Challenge Cup	2nd	McLaren-Chevrolet M6A	Bruce McLaren Motor Racing
1967	Spring Cup	2nd	Brabham-Repco BT20	Brabham Racing Organisation
1967	Tasman Cup Series	8th	Brabham-Climax BT22; Brabham-Climax BT7A	Brabham Racing Organisation
1967	USAC National Championship	13th	Eagle-Ford 67	Yunick
1967	British Sports Car Championship	NC	Ford GT40	Sidney Taylor Racing
1968	Canadian-American Challenge Cup	**1st**	**McLaren-Chevrolet M8A**	**Bruce McLaren Motor Racing**
1968	BRDC International Trophy	**1st**	**McLaren-Cosworth M7A**	**Bruce McLaren Motor Racing**
1968	FIA Formula One World Championship	3rd	McLaren-BRM M5A; McLaren-Cosworth M7A	Bruce McLaren Motor Racing
1968	Tasman Cup Series	7th	Brabham-Ford BT23	Racing Team S.A.
1968	USAC National Championship	24th	Eagle-Ford 68	All American Racers
1968	British Sports Car Championship	NC	Lola-Chevrolet T70 Mk.3 GT	Sidney Taylor Racing
1969	Canadian-American Challenge Cup	2nd	McLaren-Chevrolet M8B	McLaren Cars Ltd
1969	FIA Formula One World Championship	6th	McLaren-Cosworth M7A	Bruce McLaren Motor Racing
1969	USAC National Championship	NC	Eagle-Ford 69	Olsonite
1969	RAC British Sports Car Championship	NC	Lola-Chevrolet T70 Mk.3B GT	Sidney Taylor Racing
1970	Canadian-American Challenge Cup	**1st**	**McLaren-Chevrolet M8D**	**Bruce McLaren Motor Racing**
1970	FIA Formula One World Championship	4th	McLaren-Cosworth M14A	Bruce McLaren Motor Racing
1970	USAC National Championship	NC	McLaren-Offenhauser M15	McLaren Cars
1971	Canadian-American Challenge Cup	2nd	McLaren-Chevrolet M8F	McLaren Cars
1971	FIA Formula One World Championship	13th	McLaren-Cosworth M19A	Bruce McLaren Motor Racing
1971	USAC National Championship	NC	McLaren-Offenhauser M16A	McLaren Cars
1972	International Gold Cup	**1st**	McLaren-Cosworth M19A	Yardley Team McLaren
1972	Canadian-American Challenge Cup	2nd	McLaren-Chevrolet M20	McLaren Cars
1972	FIA Formula One World Championship	3rd	McLaren-Cosworth M19A; McLaren-Cosworth M19C	Yardley Team McLaren
1973	FIA Formula One World Championship	6th	McLaren-Cosworth M19C; McLaren-Cosworth M23	Yardley Team McLaren
1974	FIA Formula One World Championship	7th	McLaren-Cosworth M23; McLaren-Cosworth M23B	Marlboro Team McLaren
1974	International Race of Champions	8th	Porsche Carrera RSR	
1982	Australian Endurance Championship	NC	BMW 635 CSi	JPS Team BMW
1984	Australian Endurance Championship	77th	BMW 635 CSi	JPS Team BMW
1985	Australian Endurance Championship	39th	Holden VK Commodore	Ray Smith
1986	Australian Endurance Championship	35th	Mercedes-Benz 190E	Bob Jane T-Marts
1986	European Touring Car Championship	NC	Rover Vitesse	Tom Walkinshaw Racing
1986	South Pacific Touring Car Championship	16th	Mercedes-Benz 190E; BMW 325i	Bob Jane T-Marts
1987	World Touring Car Championship	NC	Holden VK Commodore SS Group A Holden VL Commodore SS Group A	Perkins Engineering
1987	Australian Touring Car Championship	NC	Ford Sierra XR4Ti	John Andrew Motorsport
1988	South Australia Cup	2nd	Holden VL Commodore SS Group A SV	Perkins Engineering
1988	Asia-Pacific Touring Car Championship	NC	Holden VL Commodore SS Group A SV	Perkins Engineering
1990	Australian Endurance Championship	NC	Ford Sierra RS500	Tony Longhurst Racing
1991	Australian Endurance Championship	11th	BMW M3 Evolution	Tony Longhurst Racing

=== Complete Formula One World Championship results ===
(key) (Races in bold indicate pole position)

Year	Entrant	Chassis	Engine	1	2	3	4	5	6	7	8	9	10	11	12	13	14	15	WDC	Points
1965	Brabham Racing Organisation	Brabham BT7	Climax V8	RSA	MON; 8	BEL		GBR; Ret		GER; Ret									11th	5
1965	Brabham Racing Organisation	Brabham BT11	Climax V8				FRA; 4		NED; 5		ITA; Ret	USA	MEX						11th	5
1966	Brabham Racing Organisation	Brabham BT22	Climax L4	MON; Ret	BEL; Ret														4th	18
1966	Brabham Racing Organisation	Brabham BT20	Repco V8			FRA; 3	GBR; 2	NED; Ret	GER; Ret	ITA; 3	USA; Ret	MEX; 3							4th	18
1967	Brabham Racing Organisation	Brabham BT20	Repco V8	RSA; 4	MON; 1	NED; 3													**1st**	**51**
1967	Brabham Racing Organisation	Brabham BT19	Repco V8				BEL; Ret												**1st**	**51**
1967	Brabham Racing Organisation	Brabham BT24	Repco V8					FRA; 2	GBR; 2	GER; 1	CAN; 2	ITA; Ret	USA; 3	MEX; 3					**1st**	**51**
1968	Bruce McLaren Motor Racing	McLaren M5A	BRM V12	RSA; 5															**3rd**	**33**
1968	Bruce McLaren Motor Racing	McLaren M7A	Ford V8		ESP; 2	MON; 5	BEL; Ret	NED; Ret	FRA; 5	GBR; 4	GER; 7	ITA; 1	CAN; 1	USA; Ret	MEX; Ret				**3rd**	**33**
1969	Bruce McLaren Motor Racing	McLaren M7A	Ford V8	RSA; 3	ESP; 4	MON; 6	NED; 4	FRA; 8	GBR; Ret	GER; Ret	ITA; 7	CAN; Ret	USA; Ret	MEX; 1					6th	20
1970	Bruce McLaren Motor Racing	McLaren M14A	Ford V8	RSA; 2	ESP; Ret	MON; 4	BEL	NED	FRA; 4	GBR; 3	GER; 3	AUT; Ret	ITA; 4	CAN; Ret	USA; 7	MEX; 3			4th	27
1971	Bruce McLaren Motor Racing	McLaren M19A	Ford V8	RSA; 6	ESP; 5	MON; 4	NED; 12	FRA; Ret	GBR; Ret	GER; Ret	AUT; Ret	ITA	CAN; 4	USA; Ret					13th	9
1972	Yardley Team McLaren	McLaren M19A	Ford V8	ARG; 2	RSA; 1	ESP; Ret													**3rd**	**39**
1972	Yardley Team McLaren	McLaren M19C	Ford V8				MON; 15	BEL; 3	FRA; 7	GBR; 5	GER; Ret	AUT; 2	ITA; 3	CAN; 3	USA; 3				**3rd**	**39**
1973	Yardley Team McLaren	McLaren M19C	Ford V8	ARG; 5	BRA; 3														6th	26
1973	Yardley Team McLaren	McLaren M23	Ford V8			**RSA**; 5	ESP; 6	BEL; 7	MON; 6	SWE; 1	FRA; 8	GBR; 3	NED; Ret	GER; 12	AUT; 8	ITA; 15	CAN; 13	USA; 4	6th	26
1974	Marlboro Team Texaco	McLaren M23B	Ford V8	ARG; 1	BRA; 12	RSA; 9	ESP; 6	BEL; 6	MON; Ret	SWE; Ret	NED; Ret	FRA; 6	GBR; 7	GER; DSQ	AUT; 2	ITA; 6	CAN; 6	USA; Ret	7th	20

=== Non-championship Formula One results ===
(key) (Races in bold indicate pole position) (Races in italics indicate fastest lap)

Year	Entrant	Chassis	Engine	1	2	3	4	5	6	7	8	9	10	11	12	13	14
1960	Denis Hulme	Cooper T45	Climax FPF 1.5 L4	GLV	INT; 12	SIL											
1960	Yeoman Credit Racing Team	Cooper T51	Climax FPF 2.5 L4				LOM; 5	OUL									
1963	Brabham Racing Organisation	Brabham BT3	Climax FWMV 1.5 V8	LOM	GLV	PAU	IMO	SYR	AIN	INT	ROM	SOL	KAN; 4	MED	AUT	OUL	RAN
1964	Brabham Racing Organisation	Brabham BT10	Ford 109E 1.5 L4	DMT	NWT	SYR	AIN; 10	INT	SOL	MED	RAN						
1965	Brabham Racing Organisation	Brabham BT11	Climax FWMV 1.5 V8	ROC	SYR	SMT	INT; Ret										
1965	Brabham Racing Organisation	Brabham BT7	Climax FWMV 1.5 V8					MED; 4	RAN								
1966	Brabham Racing Organisation	Brabham BT11	Climax FWMV 1.5 V8	RSA; Ret	SYR; Ret	INT; 4											
1966	Brabham Racing Organisation	Brabham BT20	Repco 620 3.0 V8				OUL; 2										
1967	Brabham Racing Organisation	Brabham BT20	Repco 620 3.0 V8	ROC; Ret	**SPR**; 2	INT; Ret	SYR	OUL	ESP								
1968	Bruce McLaren Motor Racing	McLaren M7A	Ford Cosworth DFV 3.0 V8	ROC; 3	**INT**; 1	OUL											
1969	Bruce McLaren Motor Racing	McLaren M7A	Ford Cosworth DFV 3.0 V8	ROC; 3	INT; Ret	MAD	OUL										
1970	Bruce McLaren Motor Racing	McLaren M14A	Ford Cosworth DFV 3.0 V8	ROC; 3	INT; 6	OUL											
1971	Bruce McLaren Motor Racing	McLaren M19A	Ford Cosworth DFV 3.0 V8	ARG	ROC; Ret	QUE; 3	SPR	INT	RIN	OUL	VIC						
1972	Yardley Team McLaren	McLaren M19A	Ford Cosworth DFV 3.0 V8	ROC; 3	BRA		OUL; 1	REP	VIC								
1972	Yardley Team McLaren	McLaren M19C	Ford Cosworth DFV 3.0 V8			INT; 4											
1973	Yardley Team McLaren	McLaren M23	Ford Cosworth DFV 3.0 V8	ROC; 2	INT; Ret												
1974	Marlboro Team Texaco	McLaren M23B	Ford Cosworth DFV 3.0 V8	PRE	ROC; NC	INT; Ret											

=== Complete British Saloon Car Championship results ===
(key) (Races in bold indicate pole position; races in italics indicate fastest lap.)

Year	Team	Car	Class	1	2	3	4	5	6	7	8	9	10	11	Pos.	Pts	Class
1962	Cooper Car Co.	Austin Mini Cooper S	A	SNE	GOO	AIN	SIL	CRY	AIN	BRH	OUL ovr:? cls:3				26th	4	7th
1963	Alan Brown Racing Ltd	Ford Galaxie	D	SNE	OUL	GOO	AIN	SIL	CRY	SIL; DNS	BRH	BRH	OUL	SIL	NC	0	NC
1964	Alan Brown Racing Ltd	Ford Galaxie	D	SNE	GOO	OUL	AIN	SIL	CRY	BRH; Ret					NC	0	NC
1964	Don Moore	Austin Mini Cooper S	A								OUL; Ret				NC	0	NC

=== Tasman Series ===
Year	Car	1	2	3	4	5	6	7	8	Rank	Points
1964	Brabham BT4	LEV; 1	PUK; 2	WIG; 3	TER; Ret	SAN; 5	WAR; 5	LAK; 9	LON	3rd	23
1967	Brabham BT22	PUK; Ret	WIG; 3	LAK; 4	WAR; Ret	SAN; Ret	LON; Ret			8th	7
1968	Brabham BT23	PUK	LEV	WIG; 3	TER; 6	SUR; 6	WAR; 5	SAN; 9	LON; DNS	7th	8

=== Complete Canadian-American Challenge Cup results ===
(key) (Races in bold indicate pole position) (Races in italics indicate fastest lap)

Year	Team	Car	Engine	1	2	3	4	5	6	7	8	9	10	11	Pos	Pts
1967	(United Kingdom) Bruce Mclaren Motor Racing	McLaren M6A	Chevrolet	ROA; 1	**BRI**; 1	**MOS**; 1	LAG; Ret	RIV; Ret	LVG; Ret						2nd	27
1968	(United Kingdom) Bruce McLaren Motor Racing	McLaren M8A	Chevrolet	ROA; 1	**BRI**; Ret	**EDM**; 1	LAG; 2	RIV; 5	LVG; 1						1st	35
1969	(United Kingdom) Bruce McLaren Motor Racing	McLaren M8B	Chevrolet	MOS; 2	MTR; 1*	WGL; 2	**EDM**; 1	**MOH**; 1	**ROA**; 2	BRI; 1	**MCH**; 2	LAG; 2	**RIV**; 1	**TWS**; Ret	2nd	160
1970	(United Kingdom) Bruce McLaren Motor Racing	McLaren M8D	Chevrolet	MOS; 3	MTR; Ret	**WGL**; 1	**EDM**; 1	**MOH**; 1	**ROA**; Ret	ATL; Ret	BRA; 1	**LAG**; 1	RIV; 1		1st	132
1971	(United Kingdom) Bruce McLaren Motor Racing	McLaren M8F	Chevrolet	MOS; 1	**MTR**; 2	**ATL**; 2	WGL; 2	**MOH**; Ret	**ROA**; Ret	BRA; 2	EDM; 1	LAG; 3	**RIV**; 1		2nd	132
1972	(United Kingdom) Bruce McLaren Motor Racing	McLaren M20	Chevrolet	MOS; 1	**ATL**; Ret	WGL; 1	MOH; 4	**ROA**; Ret	BRA; Ret	EDM; 2	LAG; Ret	RIV; 19			2nd	65

* Joint fastest lap.

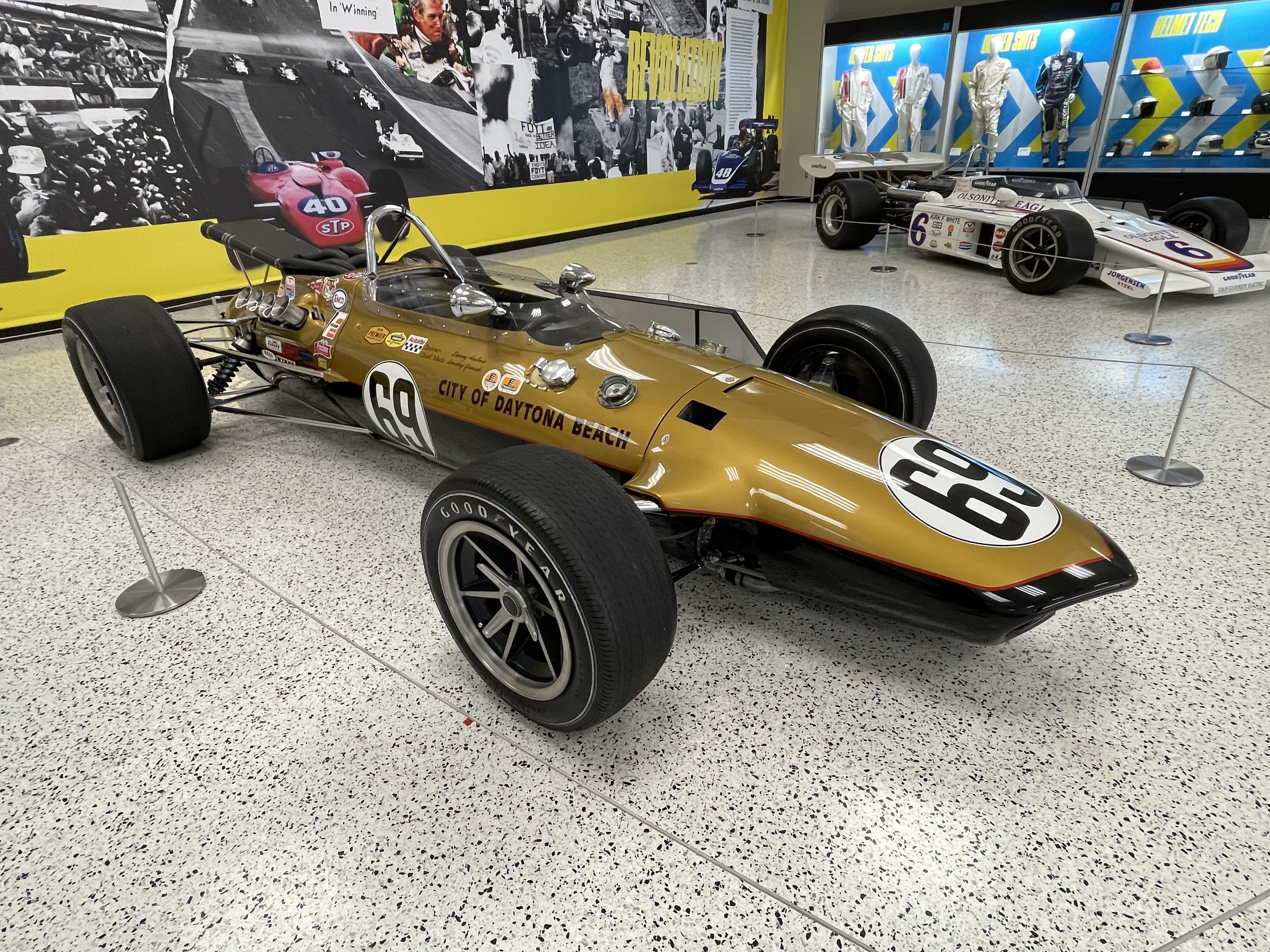
The 1967 Eagle raced by Hulme in the 1967 Indianapolis 500

=== Indianapolis 500 ===
Year	Car	Start	Qual	Rank	Finish	Laps	Led	Retired
1967	69	24	163.376	20	4	197	0	Flagged
1968	42	20	164.189	19	4	200	0	Running
1969	42	25	165.092	25	18	145	0	Clutch
1971	85	4	174.910	4	17	137	0	Valve
**Totals**						679	0	

Starts	4
Poles	0
Front row	0
Wins	0
Top 5	2
Top 10	2
Retired	2

=== Complete 24 Hours of Le Mans results ===
Year	Team	Co-drivers	Car	Class	Laps	Pos.	Class pos.
1961	(Italy) Abarth & Cie	(New Zealand) Angus Hyslop	Fiat-Abarth 850 S	S 850	263	14th	**1st**
1966	(United States) Shelby-American Inc.	(United Kingdom) Ken Miles	Ford GT40 Mk.II	P+5.0	360	**2nd**	**2nd**
1967	(United States) Holman & Moody	(United States) Lloyd Ruby	Ford GT40 Mk.IV	P+5.0	86	DNF	DNF

=== 24 Hours of Daytona ===
Year	Team	Co-drivers	Car	Class	Laps	Pos.	Class pos.
1966	(United Kingdom) Team Chamaco Collect	(United Kingdom) Victor Wilson	Ferrari 250LM	P+2.0	53	DNF	DNF
1967	(United States) Ford Motor Company (Holman & Moody)	(United States) Lloyd Ruby	Ford Mk IV	P+2.0	299	DNF	DNF

=== Complete Bathurst 1000 results ===
Year	Team	Co-drivers	Car	Class	Laps	Pos.	Class pos.
1982	(Australia) JPS Team BMW	(Australia) Stephen Brook	BMW 635 CSi	A	41	DNF	DNF
1984	(Australia) JPS Team BMW	(West Germany) Leopold von Bayern	BMW 635 CSi	Group A	148	15th	2nd
1985	(New Zealand) Auckland Coin & Bullion Exchange	(New Zealand) Ray Smith	Holden VK Commodore	C	146	DNF	DNF
1986	(Australia) Bob Jane T-Marts	(Austria) Franz Klammer	Mercedes-Benz 190E	B	157	9th	2nd
1987	(Australia) Enzed Team Perkins	(Australia) Larry Perkins	Holden VK Commodore SS Group A	1	2	DNF	DNF
1988	(Australia) Holden Special Vehicles	(Australia) Larry Perkins (United Kingdom) Tom Walkinshaw	Holden VL Commodore SS Group A SV	A	137	DNF	DNF
1989	(Australia) Benson & Hedges Racing	(Australia) Alan Jones (Australia) Tony Longhurst	Ford Sierra RS500	A	158	5th	5th
1990	(Australia) Benson & Hedges Racing	(Australia) Alan Jones	Ford Sierra RS500	A	65	DNF	DNF
1991	(Australia) Benson & Hedges Racing	(Australia) Peter Fitzgerald	BMW M3 Evolution	2	157	4th	**1st**
1992	(Australia) Benson & Hedges Racing	(Australia) Paul Morris	BMW M3 Evolution	2	32	DNF	DNF

== Notes ==
Sporting positions
Preceded by Syd Jensen	New Zealand Gold Star; Champion; 1961	Succeeded by Pat Hoare
Preceded by Jackie Stewart	Indianapolis 500 Rookie of the Year; 1967	Succeeded by Bill Vukovich II
Preceded by Jack Brabham	Formula One World Champion; 1967	Succeeded by Graham Hill
Preceded by Mike Parkes	BRDC International Trophy; Winner; 1968	Succeeded by Jack Brabham
Preceded by Bruce McLaren	Can-Am; Champion; 1968	Succeeded by Bruce McLaren
Preceded by Bruce McLaren	Can-Am; Champion; 1970	Succeeded by Peter Revson
Awards and achievements
Preceded by Jack Brabham	Hawthorn Memorial Trophy; 1967	Succeeded by Graham Hill
Preceded by Jackie Stewart	Hawthorn Memorial Trophy; 1970	Succeeded by Jackie Stewart
Preceded by Jackie Stewart	Hawthorn Memorial Trophy; 1974	Succeeded by James Hunt
