= 1965 Spring Trophy =

The 6th Spring Trophy, was a non-championship race for Formula Two cars. It was held on the Oulton Park circuit, located near Tarporley, Cheshire, England, on 3 April 1965.

== Report ==
=== Entry ===
A total of 32 F2 cars were entered for the event. However, only 21 took part in qualifying.

=== Qualifying ===
Richard Attwood took pole position for Midland Racing Partnership, in their Lola-Cosworth T60, averaging a speed of 98.403 mph (158.364 km/h).

=== Race ===
The race was held over 40 laps of the Oulton Park circuit. Denny Hulme took the winner's spoils for the works Brabham team, driving their Brabham-Cosworth BT16. Hulme won in a time of 1hr 08:39.6mins., averaging a speed of 96.492 mph (155.289 km/h). Approximately 19 seconds behind was the second place car of Jackie Stewart, for the Tyrrell Racing Organisation in their BRM-powered Cooper T75. The podium was completed by Alan Rees, in a Brabham-Cosworth BT16 of Roy Winkelmann Racing, a further 23.8 seconds behind Stewart.

== Classification ==
=== Race result ===
Pos.	No	Driver	Entrant	Car - Engine	Time, Laps	Reason Out
1st	2	(New Zealand) Denis Hulme	Brabham Racing Developments	Brabham-Honda BT16	1hr 08:39.6	
2nd	3	(United Kingdom) Jackie Stewart	Tyrrell Racing Organisation	Cooper-BRM T75	1hr 08:58.6	
3rd	24	(United Kingdom) Alan Rees	Roy Winkelmann Racing	Brabham-Cosworth BT16	1hr 09:22.4	
4th		(South Africa) Tony Maggs	Midland Racing Partnership	Lola-Cosworth T60	1hr 09:43.0	
5th	14	(United Kingdom) Mike Beckwith	Normand Ltd	Brabham-Cosworth BT10	1hr 09:47.0	
6th	30	(United Kingdom) Tony Hegbourne	John Willment Automobiles	Lola-Cosworth T55	1hr 10:23.6	
7th	6	(United Kingdom) Brian Hart	Ron Harris - Team Lotus	Lotus-Cosworth 35	39	Wishbone
8th	22	(United Kingdom) David Prophet	David Prophet Racing	Brabham-Cosworth BT10	39	
9th	9	(United Kingdom) Chris Irwin	Merlyn Racing	Merlyn-Cosworth Mk 9	39	
10th	23	(United Kingdom) Bill Bradley	David Prophet Racing	Brabham-Cosworth BT10	39	
11th	19	(France) Jacques Maglia	Jacques Maglia	Lotus-Cosworth 32	38	
12th	21	(United Kingdom) Andy Wyllie	Frank Lythgoe Racing	Brabham-Cosworth BT16	37	
NC	5	(United States) Peter Revson	Ron Harris - Team Lotus	Lotus-Cosworth 32	34	Oil pressure
NC	12	(New Zealand) Chris Amon	Ian Raby Racing	Merlyn-Cosworth Mk 9	34	
NC	11	(United Kingdom) Trevor Taylor	Aurora Gear Racing	Brabham-Cosworth BT16	27	
DNF	8	(United Kingdom) Graham Hill	John Coombs	Brabham-BRM BT16	17	Engine
DNF	1	(Australia) Jack Brabham	Brabham Racing Developments	Brabham-Honda BT16	16	Spark plugs
DNF	20	(United Kingdom) Alan Rollinson	Frank Lythgoe Racing	Cooper-Cosworth T72	14	Chassis
DNF	25	(Austria) Jochen Rindt	Roy Winkelmann Racing	Brabham-Cosworth BT16	10	Gears
DNF	28	(United Kingdom) Richard Attwood	Midland Racing Partnership	Lola-Cosworth T60	7	Gears
DNS	17	(United Kingdom) John Taylor	Bob Gerard Racing	Cooper-Ford T73		

- Fastest lap: Graham Hill & Jochen Rindt, 1:41.4secs. (98.015 mph)
