= 1964 Grote Prijs van Limborg =

Circuit Zolder (1963–1972)

The 1964 Grote Prijs van Limborg (Limborgh Grand Prix), was the inaugural race to bear the title. It was a non-championship race for Formula Two cars, held on the Zolder, race track in Heusden-Zolder, Belgium, on 23 August 1964.

== Report ==
=== Entry ===
A total of 30 F2 cars were entered for the event. However, only 21 took part in qualifying.

=== Qualifying ===
Jackie Stewart took pole position for Ron Harris-Lotus, in their Lotus 32-Cosworth, averaging a speed of 93.506 mph (150.483 km/h).

=== Race ===
The race was held over two heats, both of 25 laps of the Zolder circuit. The winner was based on the aggregated points scored across the two heats. Points were awarded, based on the drivers finishing positions. Denny Hulme took the overall winner's spoils for the works Brabham team, driving their Brabham-Cosworth BT10. Hulme won in an aggregated time of 1hr 24:47.2mins., averaging a speed of 89.165 mph (143.497 km/h). 45.9 seconds behind was the second place car of Lucien Bianchi, for Ron Harris-Team Lotus in their Cosworth-powered Lotus 32. The podium was completed by another Ron Harris Lotus, of Brian Hart, in a Lotus 32, just a further 9.9 seconds behind his team-mate, despite being equal on points.

Heat One saw Jackie Stewart take the win for Ron Harris, with Hulme 4.6seconds adrift and Richard Attwood in third. However, as Stewart and Attwood retired in the second heat, this left Hulme in first place, nearly 17 seconds clear of Alan Rees. Hart was a further 4.9 seconds behind, but this combined with his sixth place in heat one, left him equal on points with Bianchi, who finished fifth and fourth in the heats respectively, but approximately 10 seconds down on the aggregate race times.

== Classification ==
=== Aggregate race result ===
Pos.	No	Driver	Entrant	Car - Engine	Time, Laps	Pts.
1st	10	(New Zealand) Denis Hulme	Brabham Racing Developments	Brabham-Cosworth BT10	1hr 24:47.2	3
2nd	4	(Belgium) Lucien Bianchi	Ron Harris - Team Lotus	Lotus-Cosworth 32	1hr 25:33.1	9
3rd	8	(United Kingdom) Brian Hart	Ron Harris - Team Lotus	Lotus-Cosworth 32	1hr 25:43.0	9
4th	58	(United Kingdom) David Hobbs	Merlyn Racing	Merlyn-Cosworth Mk 7	1hr 26:52.5	14
5th	24	(France) Jo Schlesser	Ecurie Ford France S.A.	Brabham-Cosworth BT10	1hr 26:57.4	15
6th	42	(United Kingdom) David Prophet	David Prophet Racing	Brabham-Cosworth BT10	1hr 27:28.8	16
7th	26	(France) Guy Ligier	Ecurie Ford France S.A.	Brabham-Cosworth BT6	1hr 28:06.4	17
8th	16	(United Kingdom) Alan Rees	Roy Winkelmann Racing	Brabham-Cosworth BT10	48	20
9th	34	(Belgium) Mauro Bianchi	Société des Automobiles Alpine	Alpine-Renault A270	46	24
NC	54	(United Kingdom) Richard Attwood	Midland Racing Partnership	Lola-Cosworth T55	35	
NC	12	(United Kingdom) Mike Beckwith	Normand Racing Team Ltd.	Cooper-Cosworth T71	35	
NC	6	(United Kingdom) Peter Procter	Ron Harris – Team Lotus	Lotus-Cosworth 32	32	
NC	18	(Australia) Frank Gardner	John Willment Automobiles	Brabham-Cosworth BT10	29	
NC	2	(United Kingdom) Jackie Stewart	Ron Harris – Team Lotus	Lotus-Cosworth 32	27	
NC	28	(France) Jacques Maglia	Jacques Maglia	Brabham-Cosworth BT10	22	
NC	46	(Germany) Kurt Ahrens Jr.	Kurt Ahrens Jr.	Cooper-Cosworth T65	13	
NC	14	(United Kingdom) Tony Hegbourne	Normand Racing Team Ltd.	Cooper-Cosworth T71	12	
NC	22	(United States) Peter Revson	Team Alexis	Alexis-Cosworth Mk 5	6	
NC	44	(Belgium) Jean-Claude Franck	David Prophet Racing	Lotus-Cosworth 32	0	
NC	20	(Australia) Paul Hawkins	John Willment Automobiles	Lola-Cosworth T55	0	
DNS	44	(United Kingdom) Piers Courage	David Prophet Racing	Lotus-Cosworth 32		
DNQ	32	(Switzerland) Frank Dörfliger	Siffert Racing Team	Brabham-Cosworth BT10		

- Fastest lap: Richard Attwood, 1:40.45secs. 93.553 mph (150.559 km/h)

=== Heat 1 result ===
Pos.	Driver	Time, Laps	Reason Out
1st	Stewart	42:15.2	
2nd	Hulme	42:19.8	
3rd	Attwood	42:22.0	
4th	Procter	42:39.5	
5th	L. Bianchi	42:42.1	
6th	Hart	42:55.9	
7th	Beckwith	43:23.6	
8th	Hobbs	43:26.8	
9th	Prophet	43:36.8	
10th	Schlesser	43:54.3	
11th	Ligier	43:57.7	
12th	Rees	23	
13th	Maglia	22	
14th	M. Bianchi	22	
DNF	Ahrens	13	Mechanical
DNF	Hegbourne	12	
DNF	Revson	6	
DNF	Gardner	4	Oil Pipe
DNF	Hawkins	0	Cam follower
DNF	Franck	0	Oil pressure

=== Heat 2 result ===
Pos.	Driver	Time, Laps	Reason Out
1st	Hulme	42:27.4	
2nd	Rees	42:44.2	
3rd	Hart	42:47.1	
4th	L. Bianchi	42:51.0	
5th	Gardner	43:00.7	
6th	Schlesse	43:03.1	
7th	Hobbs	43:27.7	
8th	Prophet	43:52.0	
9th	Ligier	44:08.7	
10th	M. Bianchi	24	
DNF	Attwood	10	Distributor
DNF	Beckwith	10	Engine
DNF	Procter	7	Engine
DNF	Stewart	2	Engine
