= Gemini (racing car) =

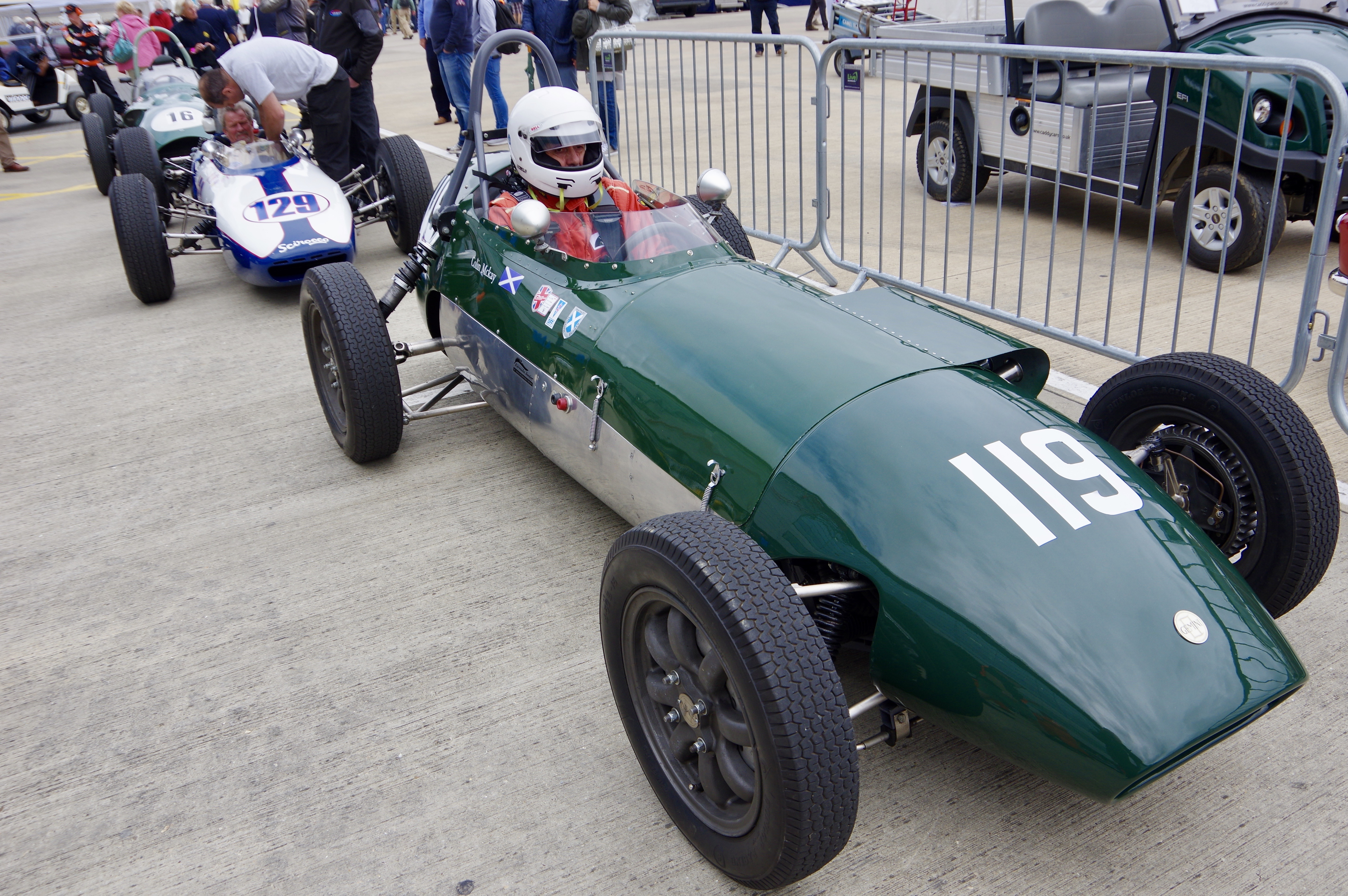
Gemini Mk 2.

The Gemini name was used on a series of Formula Junior racing cars built by Chequered Flag Engineering of Chiswick, London between 1959 and 1963.

== Mk 1 ==
In 1959, Graham Warner, the principal of The Chequered Flag Car Sales in Chiswick, West London, purchased the Moorland Mk 2, a Formula Junior car which had been constructed by Leslie Redmond in early 1959 from drawings supplied by Len Terry. The car was renamed the Gemini Mk 1 and won on debut at Brands Hatch in September 1959.

== Mk 2 ==
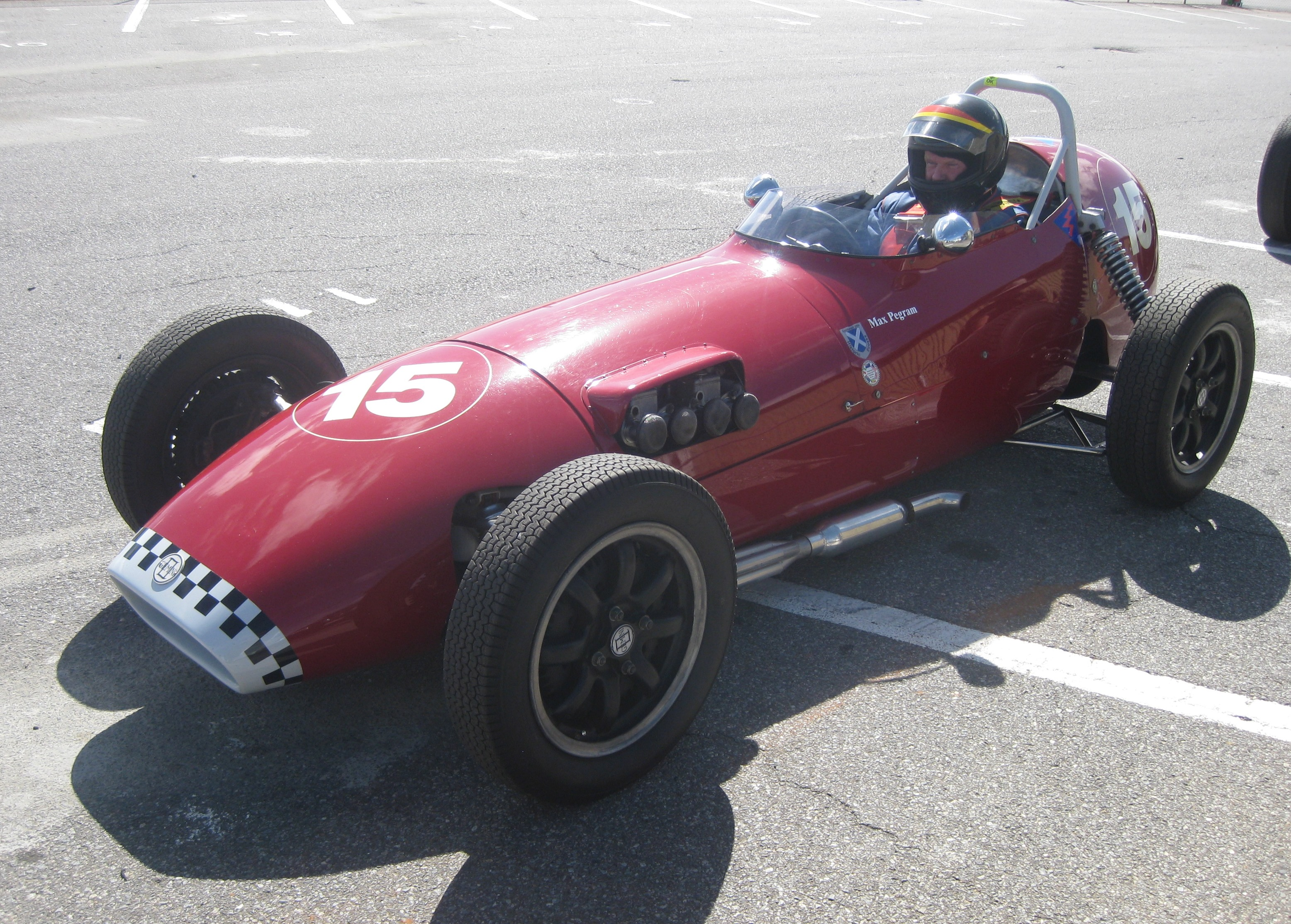
Gemini Mk.2

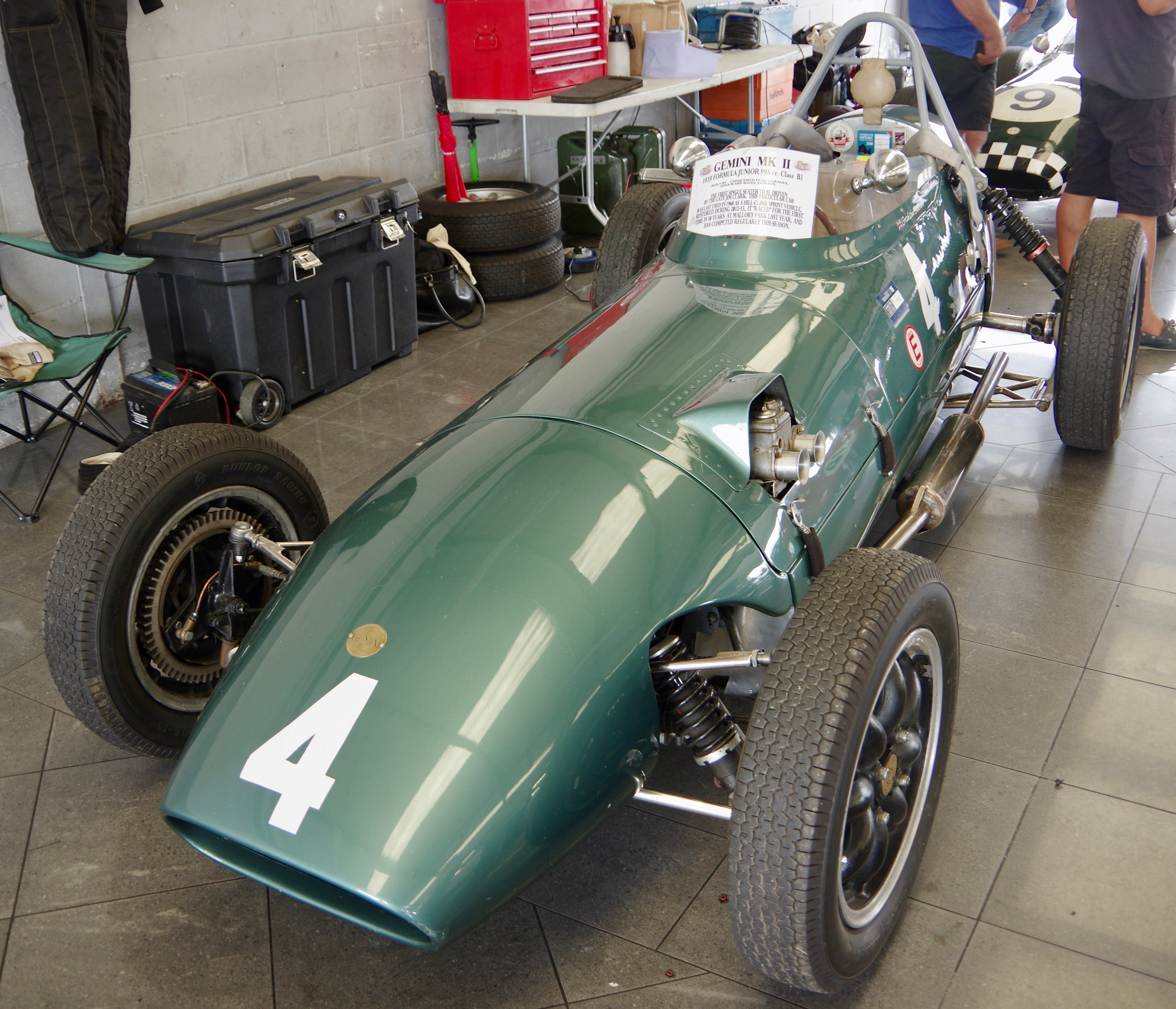
Gemini Mk.2, driven by Jim Clark.

Having acquired the design rights, jigs and moulds for the Moorland, along with Redmond's services as designer, Warner formed a new company, Chequered Flag Engineering. The Gemini Mk 2 was subsequently produced and was first raced in a Formula Junior event at Brands Hatch in October 1959.

It is believed that thirty Mk 2s were built, four powered by Ford Cosworths and all others by BMC A Series engines.

== Mk 3 & Mk 3A ==
The rear engined Gemini Mk 3 was introduced during 1960 and met with success in the hands of Tony Maggs, Geoff Duke and Peter Ashdown. The Mk 3A of 1961 proved to be the only challengers to Cooper and Lotus in that year. A total of eight Mk 3As were built in addition to the one prototype Mk 3.

== Mk 4 & Mk 4A ==
The Gemini Mk 4 was developed in 1962. The car was of advanced design and featured inboard suspension, inboard brakes and two small radiators on each side of the car. It was powered by a Cosworth modified Ford engine mated to a Renault Dauphine gearbox. In 1963 the project was handed over to George Henrotte as the Gemini Mk 4A and production ended in the same year.
