= Anita Taylor =

Anita Taylor is professor emerita of communication and a member of the gender and women studies faculty at George Mason University. Taylor was born in Kansas during the Dust Bowl and went on to become very active in research focusing on women in education.

== Background ==
Anita Taylor was born in southern Kansas, near Caldwell, during the Dust Bowl. She later attended the University of Missouri, where she obtained her Ph.D. in Rhetoric and Public Address.

Taylor has taught or worked in administration at the university level for more than 45 years. She was chair of George Mason University Department of Communication and Performing Arts as well as the founding chair of the Communication Department there.

Taylor was elected president of the National Communication Association in 1981.

== Contributions to the communication field ==
Taylor has contributed to the communication field by focusing mainly on women in education. Her first published book was Communicating, which was eventually published in six editions.

From 1989 until 2010 she was the editor of Women and Language, a research periodical. While working at this periodical she published many reviews of other scholars.

She has also edited the publications Gender and Conflict, Hearing Many Voices, and Women as Communicators: Studies of Women’s Talk.

== Selected publications ==
- Taylor, A. (1975, 1992). Communicating (1st ed., 6th ed.). Upper Saddle River, NJ: Prentice Hall.
- Taylor, A. (1979, 1984). Speaking in Public (1st ed.; 2nd ed.). Upper Saddle River, NJ: Prentice Hall.
- Taylor, A., Bate, B. (1988). Women Communicating: Studies of Women’s Talk. Norwood, NJ: Ablex.
