= Bo Ljungfeldt =

Swedish racecar driver

Bo Tage Georg Ljungfeldt (26 February 1922 – 25 January 1988) was a Swedish racecar driver and a Ford rally factory driver.

== Life ==
Ljungfeldt was born in the municipality of Ekerö and won 6.5 Swedish championship gold medals in racing. He died in Ekerö.

In 1964, Ljungfeldt finished second in the Monte Carlo rally.

== Family ==
Ljungfeldt's son, Conny Ljungfeldt (born 1950) is a two-time Swedish champion in Formula 3 (1975–1976).
