= Ausper =

Ausper T2 Ausper T3 Ausper T4
- Category: Formula Junior
- Designer(s): Tom Hawkes
- Production: At least 8

Technical specifications
- Chassis: Multi-tubular Space-frame
- Suspension: unequal length wishbones (Front) twin Radius rods (Rear)
- Length: (T2 and T3): 2,327 millimetres (91.6 in) (T4): 3,977 millimetres (156.6 in)
- Width: (T2 and T3): 1,000 millimetres (39.4 in) (T2 and T3) (T4): 715 millimetres (28.1 in)
- Height: (T2 and T3): 736.6 millimetres (29 in) (T4): 775 millimetres (30.5 in)
- Axle track: (T2 and T3): 927.1 millimetres (36.5 in) (Front); 1,016.0 millimetres (40 in) (Rear) (T4): 1,400 millimetres (55.1 in) (Front and Rear)
- Wheelbase: (T2 and T3): 1,429 millimetres (56.3 in) (T4): 2,400 millimetres (94.5 in)
- Engine: See Table Longitudinal engine, Rear mid-engine, rear-wheel-drive layout
- Transmission: 4, 5, and 6-speed Manuals
- Brakes: (T2 and T3): Alfin Drum brakes (T4): Front Disc brakes, Rear Drum brakes

Competition history
- Notable drivers: Anthony “Bubbles” Horsley; Patrick Allfrey
Entries	Races	Wins	Podiums
91	79	18	26
Poles	F/Laps		
12	3		

The Ausper is a racing car that was made in the United Kingdom from 1960 to 1962 by Competition Cars of Australia. It was constructed as a Formula Junior car, with a rear-mounted Cosworth engine set in a tubular space frame, with a Renault gearbox. It was based on the Tomahawk, a design from Australian Tom Hawkes, that was intended for export to his home country. One of the unusual features of the Ausper was the bodywork, which was very low, with an upswept tail and the drivers roll bar faired into the headrest.

The Ausper was revised in 1962, with sleeker bodywork, and a total height of 24 inches to the top of the body. Results were encouraging, but did not result in any title wins.

== Formula One Project ==
Ausper developed plans for a Formula One car using a Clisby V6 engine, called the T4. The car was a poorly made copy of the Ferrari 156 F1. The car was slow off the line, handled poorly, but would get a third in its first and only outing in Formula Libre . But these plans never eventuated, which led to Ausper closing down.

== Models ==
Name	Engine	Displacement	Horsepower	Horsepower RPM	Torque	Torque RPM	Weight
T2	Volkswagen Beetle Flat 4	1,493 cc (91.1 cu in)	127 bhp (128.8 PS; 94.7 kW)	5,000	144 N⋅m (106.2 lb⋅ft)	3,600	557.9 kg (1,230 lb)
T3	Volkswagen Beetle Flat 4	1,493 cc (91.1 cu in)	138 bhp (139.9 PS; 102.9 kW)	5,250	158.6 N⋅m (117.0 lb⋅ft)	3,500	515.3 kg (1,136 lb)
T4	Clisby V6	1,494 cc (91.2 cu in)	189.7 bhp (192.3 PS; 141.5 kW)	9,000	133 N⋅m (98.1 lb⋅ft)	6,700	485 kg (1,069.2 lb)
