= Tom Trana =

Swedish rally driver (1937–1991)

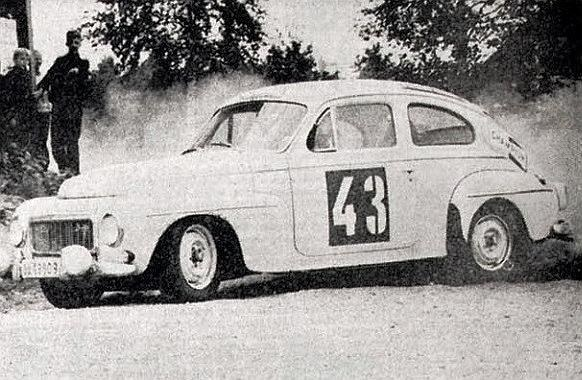
Trana drives a Volvo PV544 at the 1963 1000 Lakes Rally in Jyväskylä.

Tom Trana (29 November 1937 – 17 May 1991), was a Swedish motor rally driver. This Värmland sportsman was Volvo's counterpart to Saab's Erik Carlsson ("Carlsson på taket" - "Carlsson on the roof"). It has been said that he had to drive the rear-wheel drive Volvo more enthusiastically than Carlsson, with the front-wheel drive Saab.

== Early life ==
Trana was born in Kristinehamn, Sweden, on 29 November 1937. His father was Ivar Trana, who was an engineer at Albin Motor in Kristinehamn.

== Career ==
Originally a Volvo mechanic, Trana started his career in his hometown in the 1950s through Einar Nyqvist. He showed strong driving performances with his own Volvo P1800 and with a British BMC vehicle. He came to the attention of the Volvo works team and its leader, Gunnar Andersson, himself twice European Rally Championship, as early as 1962. For 1963, he was given a works drive and won the British RAC Rally in the same season. Volvo won the European Rally Championship in 1963 with a special 122S. That same year, a 122S driven by Trana finished a very close second to Jaguar in the European Touring Car Championship.

A year later, Trana was again the overall RAC Rally winner. He achieved further wins in the 1964 Acropolis Rally in Greece in 1964 and in his home event, the Swedish Rally in 1965. These achievements earned him a definitive place in the top league of motor sport and the nickname the "Horseman of the Apocalypse".

Soon thereafter, Trana was in collision with a transporter and his co-driver Gunnar Thermaenius died. Trana was cleared of any guilt, in the subsequent legal proceedings. Nevertheless, he changed from daredevil to careful driver, who could still be very fast but without the conquering carefreeness that is linked to success. In addition, Volvo withdrew its works team for more than ten years, following a further fatal accident on the 1966 Akropolis Rally, in which two mechanics died. It continued to provide generous support for private entrants, however. Trana changed to Saab for 1967, which resulted in relative success, including a win in the 1967 Norwegian Rally. He also took the Swedish Championship, in 1968. He rallied with Saab until 1972, when he finally hung up his helmet and retired from rallying.

== Postscript ==
Tom Trana died on 17 May 1991 at age 53.

Volvo only officially returned to motor sport at the end of the 1970s, sending the Volvo R-Team (R stood for Rallycross, Rallying and Racing) to the FIA Rallycross European Championships of the years 1978 to 1980. Driven by Per-Inge Walfridsson, the legitimate successor to Tom Trana as a representative of the Swedish car maker, Volvo succeeded in 1980 (with a 343 Turbo) against the Norwegian Martin Schanche (Ford Escort RS 1800) and won the Rallycross EC title.

Sporting positions
Preceded by Gunnar Andersson	European Rally Champion; 1964	Succeeded by Rauno Aaltonen
