= Cooper T59 =

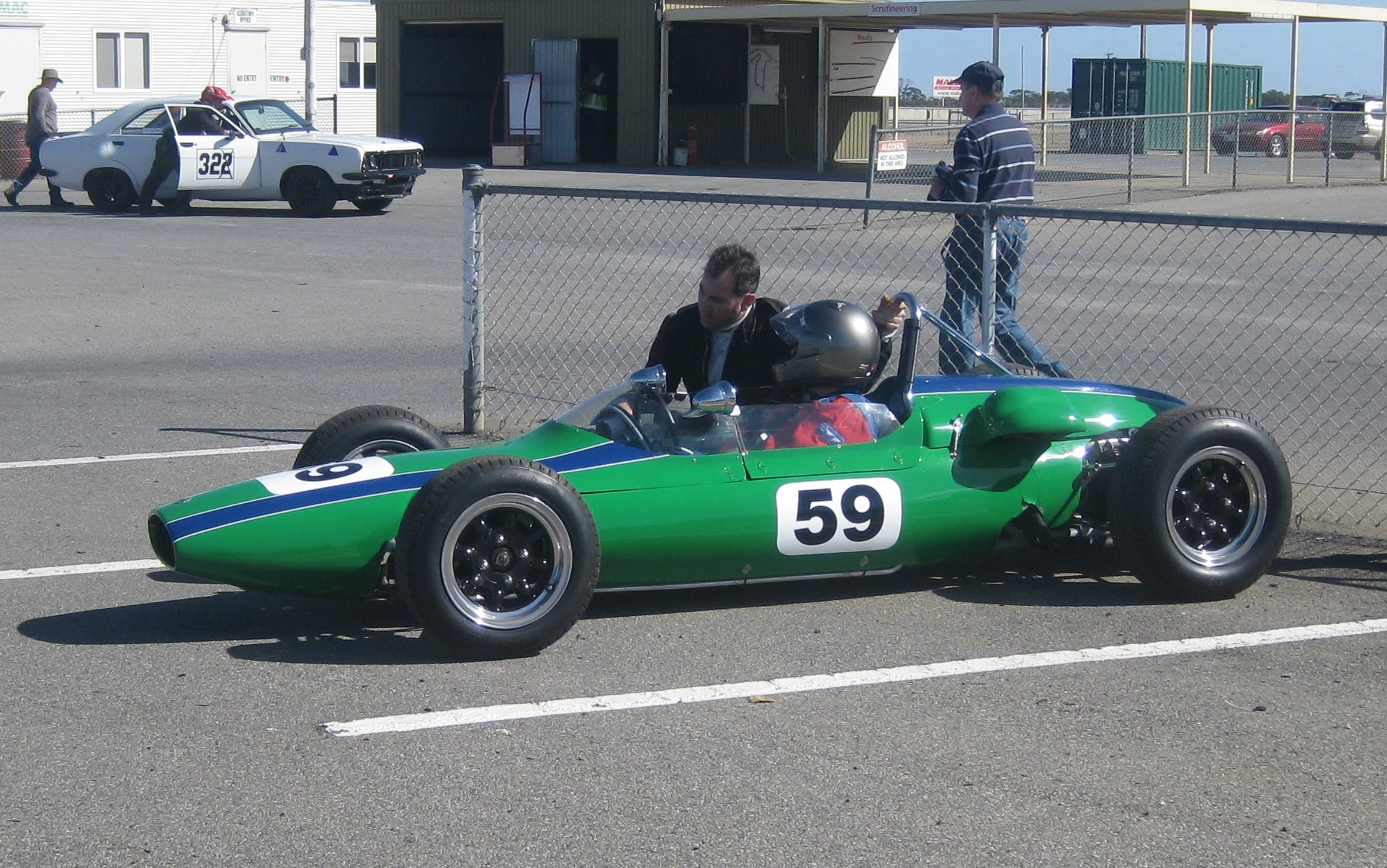
The 1962 Cooper T59 FJ of Michael Shearer, pictured in 2014

The Cooper T59 was the third series Formula Junior racing car produced by the Cooper Car Company, designed for the 1962 season. Similar in layout to the T56, the T59 was five inches narrower and one and half inches lower than its predecessor. A semi-reclining seat position was adopted for the driver. The chassis frame was stiffened up and the front and rear roll centres raised. T59s were supplied with either Ford or BMC 'A series' engines.

== Complete Formula One World Championship results ==
(key)

Year	Entrant	Engine	Tyres	Drivers	1	2	3	4	5	6	7	8	9	10	Pts.	WCC
1962	Anglo-American Equipe	Climax FPF 1.5 L4	D		NED	MON	BEL	FRA	GBR	GER	ITA	USA	RSA		29 (37)*	3rd
1962	Anglo-American Equipe	Climax FPF 1.5 L4	D	Ian Burgess					12	11	DNQ				29 (37)*	3rd
1965	Trevor Blokdyk	Ford 109E 1.5 L4	D		RSA	MON	BEL	FRA	GBR	NED	GER	ITA	USA	MEX	0	NC
1965	Trevor Blokdyk	Ford 109E 1.5 L4	D	Trevor Blokdyk	DNQ										0	NC

* Includes points scored by other Cooper models
