= Cooper T56 =

Second series of Formula Junior racing cars from the Cooper Car Company

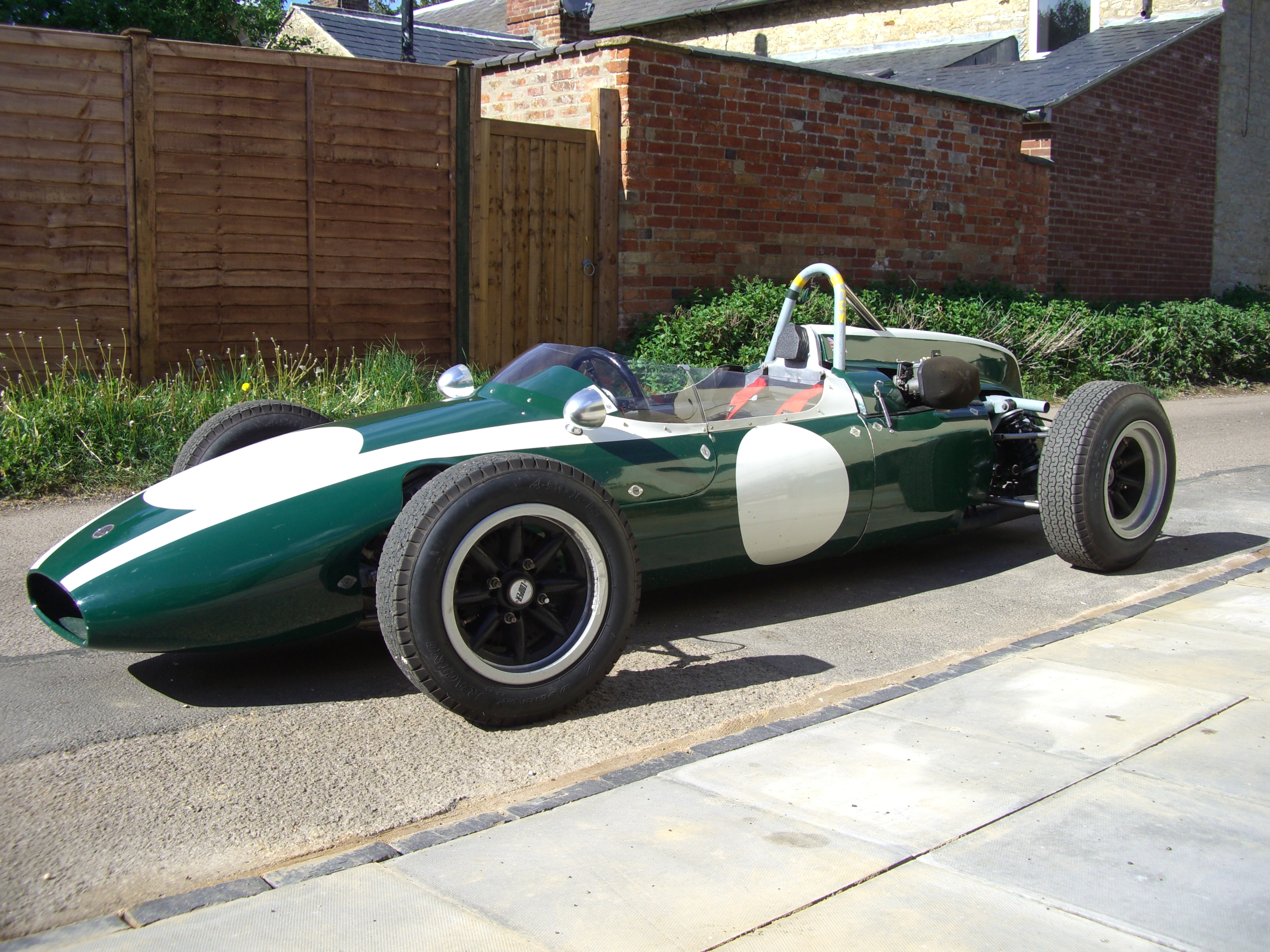
A Cooper T56 in Cooper works racing livery

The Cooper T56 was the second series of Formula Junior racing cars offered by the Cooper Car Company. Although officially a 1961 model, the first T56 raced in 1960. In addition to the factory constructed cars, a number of kits were sold.

The T56 was replaced by the T59, the third Cooper Formula Junior design, in 1962.
