= 1969 British Formula Three season =

Seasons
- ← 1968 1970 →

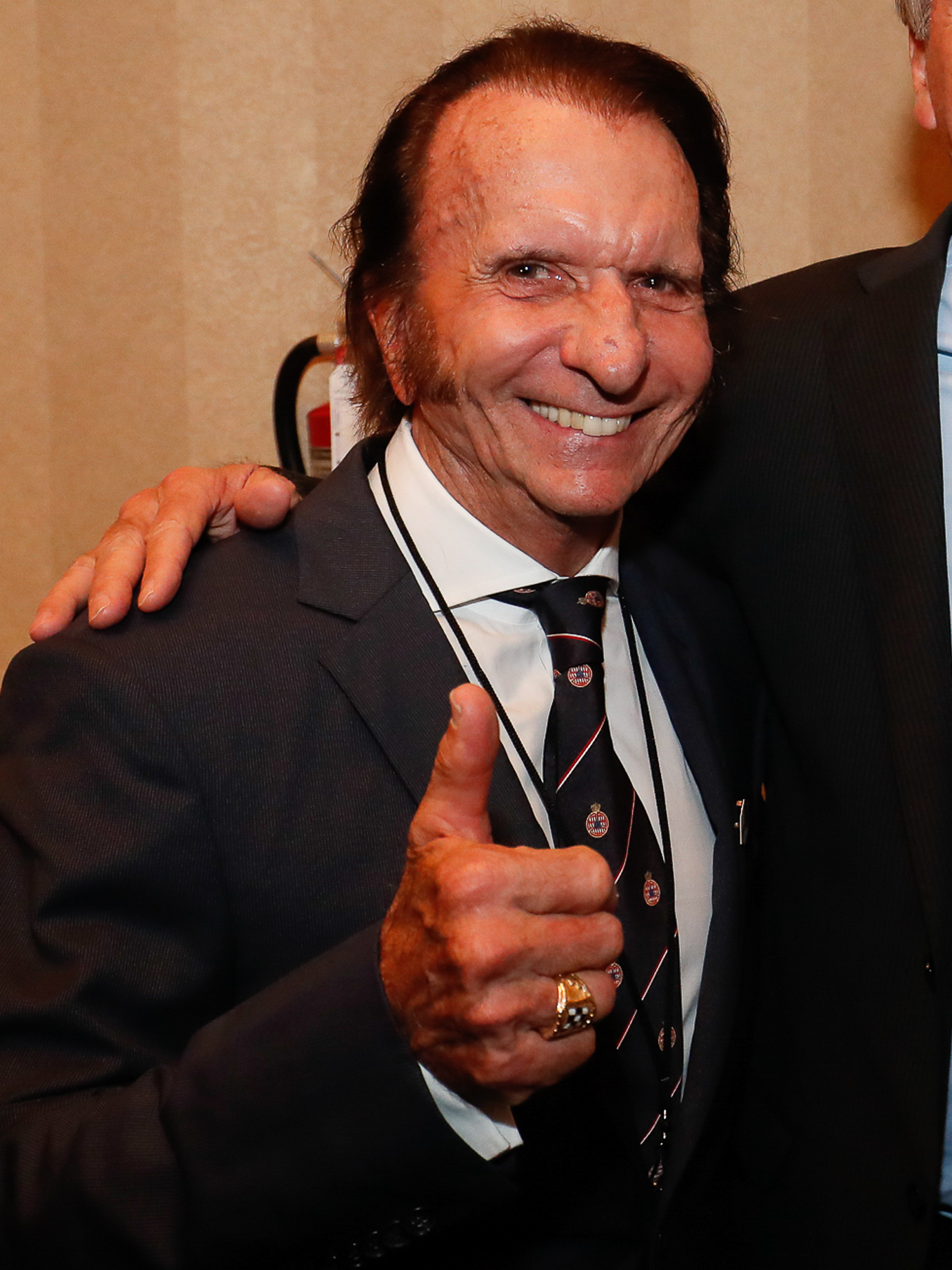
1969 champion, Emerson Fittipaldi

The 1969 British Formula Three Championship (known as the 1969 Lombank British F3 Championship for sponsorship reasons) was the 19th season of the British Formula 3 season. Future two-time Formula One world champion Emerson Fittipaldi, driving the Lotus 59, won the championship by 8 points from Alan Rollinson. It was also the first season in Formula Three for James Hunt.

== Race Calendar and Results ==
=== Championship Events ===
| Round | Circuit | Date | Pole position | Winning driver | Winning team |
|---|---|---|---|---|---|
| 1 | (United Kingdom) Mallory Park | 9 March | (Australia) Tim Schenken | (United Kingdom) Alan Rollinson | Alan Rollinson |
| 2 | (United Kingdom) Oulton Park | 15 March | (Australia) Tim Schenken | (Australia) Tim Schenken | Sports Motors (Manchester) |
| 3 | (United Kingdom) Snetterton | 23 March | (United Kingdom) Alan Rollinson | (United Kingdom) Alan Rollinson | Alan Rollinson |
| 4 | (United Kingdom) Snetterton | 4 April | (Australia) Tim Schenken | (Sweden) Reine Wisell | Chevron Cars Ltd. |
| 5 | (United Kingdom) Mallory Park | 7 April | (United Kingdom) Alan Rollinson | (United Kingdom) Alan Rollinson | Alan Rollinson |
| 6 | (United Kingdom) Oulton Park | 3 May | (United Kingdom) Alan Rollinson | (United Kingdom) Alan Rollinson | Alan Rollinson |
| 7 | (United Kingdom) Mallory Park | 4 May | N/A | (United Kingdom) Alan Rollinson | Alan Rollinson |
| 8 | (United Kingdom) Brands Hatch | 25 May | (United Kingdom) Richard Scott | (United Kingdom) Keith Jupp | PM Racing Preparations |
| 9 | (United Kingdom) Brands Hatch | 15 June | (United Kingdom) Richard Scott | (United Kingdom) Richard Scott | Richard Scott |
| 10 | (United Kingdom) Mallory Park | 13 July | (United States) Roy Pike | (United States) Roy Pike | Team Lotus |
| 11 | (United Kingdom) Brands Hatch | 3 August | (Japan) Tetsu Ikuzawa | (United Kingdom) Bev Bond | Race Cars International |
| 12 | (United Kingdom) Mallory Park | 10 August | (United States) Roy Pike | (Brazil) Emerson Fittipaldi | Jim Russell Racing Driver School |
| 13 | (United Kingdom) Brands Hatch | 17 August | (Australia) Wayne Mitchell | (Brazil) Emerson Fittipaldi | Jim Russell Racing Driver School |
| 14 | (United Kingdom) Brands Hatch | 14 September | (United Kingdom) Bev Bond | (Brazil) Emerson Fittipaldi | Jim Russell Racing Driver School |
| 15 | (United Kingdom) Mallory Park | 28 September | (Brazil) Emerson Fittipaldi | (Brazil) Emerson Fittipaldi | Jim Russell Racing Driver School |
| 16 | (United Kingdom) Mallory Park | 12 October | (Australia) Dave Walker | (United Kingdom) Barrie Maskell | Barrie Maskell |
| 17 | (United Kingdom) Brands Hatch | 9 November | (United Kingdom) Tony Trimmer | (Brazil) Emerson Fittipaldi | Jim Russell Racing Driver School |

=== Non-Championship Events ===
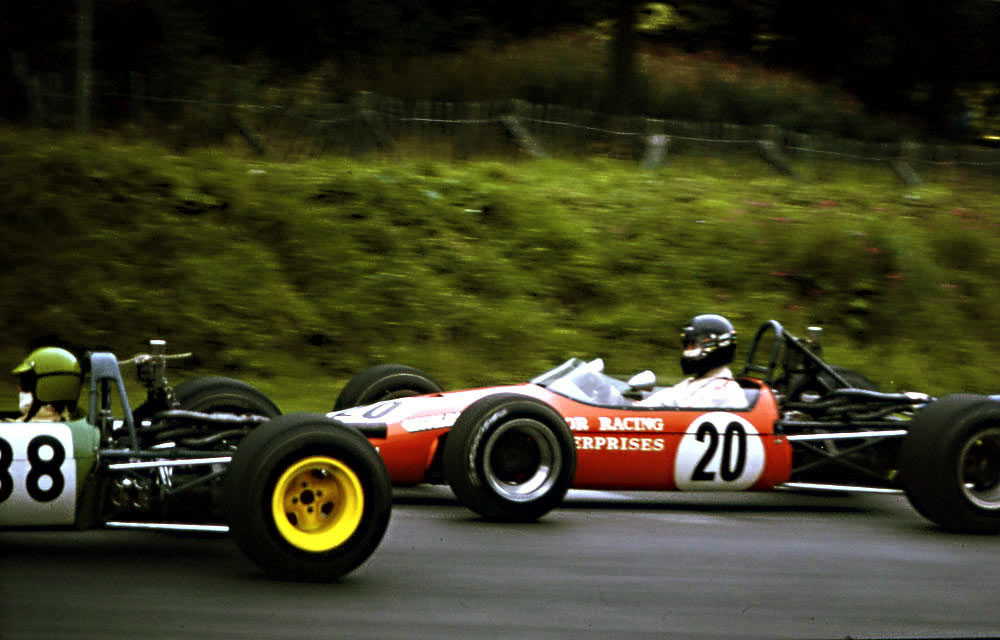
James Hunt driving the Brabham BT21 in the IX Guards International Trophy race at Brands Hatch.

| Event | Circuit | Date | Pole position | Winning driver | Winning team |
|---|---|---|---|---|---|
| 1969 Chris Moore Memorial Trophy | (United Kingdom) Thruxton | 16 March | N/A | (United Kingdom) Alan Rollinson | Alan Rollinson |
| 1969 Martini International Trophy | (United Kingdom) Silverstone | 17 May | (United Kingdom) Alan Rollinson | (United Kingdom) Charles Lucas | Charles Lucas Engineering |
| XVII Greater London Trophy | (United Kingdom) Crystal Palace | 26 June | (Sweden) Ronnie Peterson | (Australia) Tim Schenken | Sports Motors (Manchester) |
| 1969 Guards 4,000 Guineas | (United Kingdom) Mallory Park | 29 June | (Japan) Tetsu Ikuzawa | (Japan) Tetsu Ikuzawa | Michael Spence Ltd |
| I Plessey Trophy | (United Kingdom) Silverstone | 19 July | (Australia) Tim Schenken | (United Kingdom) Alan Rollinson | Alan Rollinson |
| 1969 Daily Express Trophy | (United Kingdom) Crystal Palace | 2 August | (Sweden) Reine Wisell | (Sweden) Reine Wisell | Chevron Cars Ltd. |
| IX Guards International Trophy | (United Kingdom) Brands Hatch | 1 September | N/A | (Sweden) Reine Wisell | Chevron Cars Ltd. |
| 1969 Reg Parnell Trophy | (United Kingdom) Crystal Palace | 13 September | (United Kingdom) Charles Lucas | (Brazil) Emerson Fittipaldi | Jim Russell Racing Driver School |
| 1969 Lincolnshire International Trophy | (United Kingdom) Cadwell Park | 28 September | (New Zealand) Howden Ganley | (Australia) Tim Schenken | Sports Motors (Manchester) |
| 1969 E.R. Hall Trophy | (United Kingdom) Brands Hatch | 19 October | (Australia) Tim Schenken | (Sweden) Reine Wisell | Chevron Cars Ltd. |
| 1969 W.D. and H.O. Wills Trophy | (United Kingdom) Thruxton | 15 November | (Australia) Dave Walker | (Brazil) Emerson Fittipaldi | Jim Russell Racing Driver School |

== Championship Standings ==
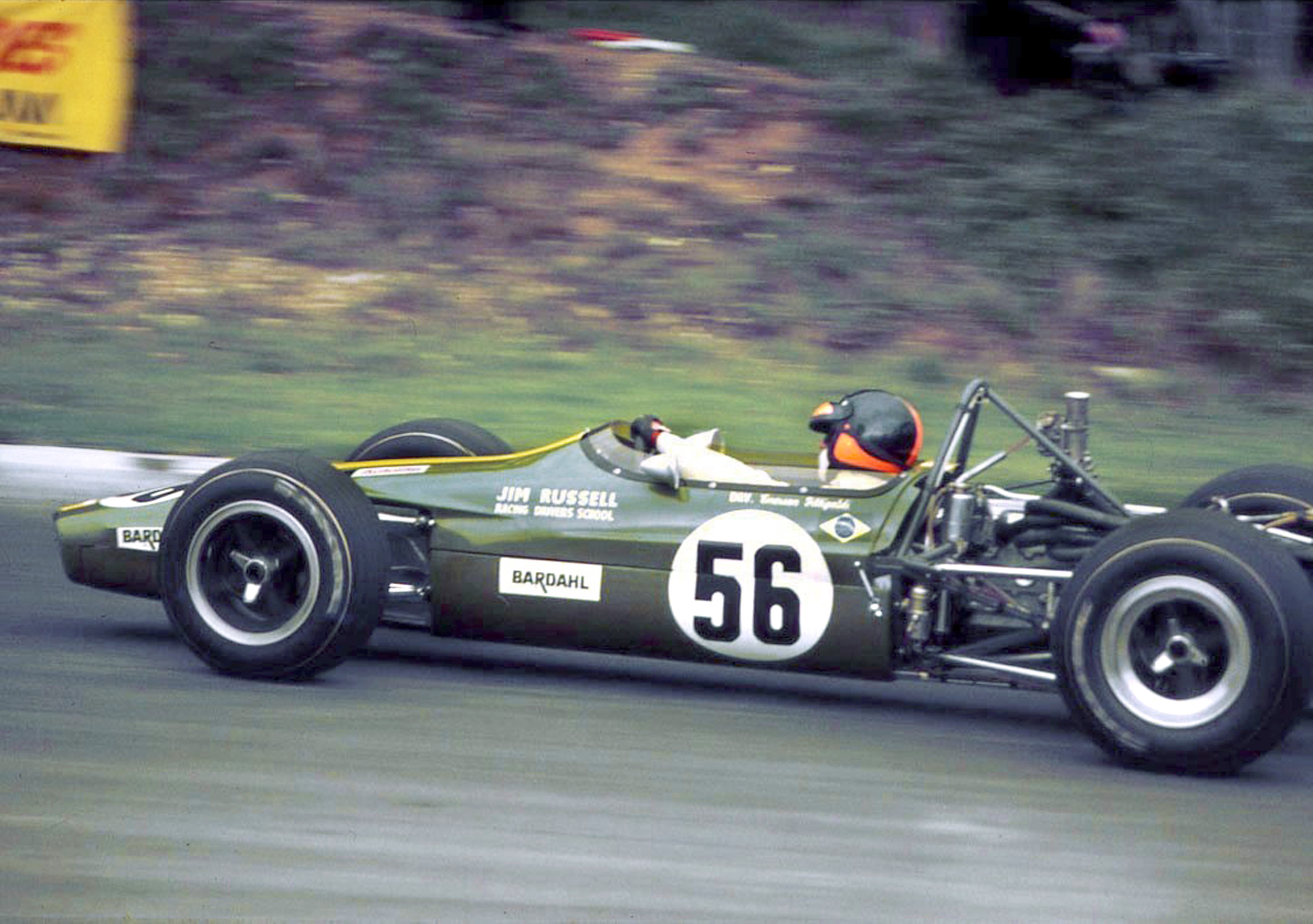
Championship winner Emerson Fittipaldi driving the Lotus 59 in the IX Guards International Trophy race at Brands Hatch.

| Place | Driver | Entrant | Total |
|---|---|---|---|
| 1 | (Brazil) Emerson Fittipaldi | Jim Russell Racing Driver School | 57 |
| 2 | (United Kingdom) Alan Rollinson | Alan Rollinson | 49 |
| 3 | (United Kingdom) Bev Bond | Race Cars International | 39 |
| 4 | (United States) Roy Pike | Roy Pike | 38 |
| 5 | (United Kingdom) Richard Scott | Richard Scott | 36 |
| 6 | (Australia) Tim Schenken | Sports Motors (Manchester) | 33 |
| 7 | (Sweden) Reine Wisell | Chevron Cars Ltd. | 27 |
| 8 | (United Kingdom) Barrie Maskell | Barrie Maskell | 26 |
| 9 | (United Kingdom) Mo Nunn | Team Lotus | 23 |
| 10 | (United Kingdom) Keith Jupp | PM Racing Preparations | 18 |
| 11 | (Australia) Dave Walker | Jim Russell Racing Driver School | 14 |
| 12 | (United Kingdom) Peter Deal | Peter Deal | 12 |
| 13 | (United Kingdom) David Cole | Car Consultants USA | 10 |
| 14 | (United Kingdom) Mike Watkins | Mike Watkins | 9 |
| 15 | (United Kingdom) James Hunt | Motor Racing Enterprises | 8 |
