= 1968 British Formula Three season =

Seasons
- ← 1967 1969 →

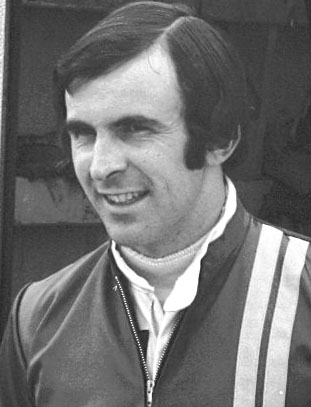
1968 champion, Tim Schenken

The 1968 British Formula Three Championship (known as the 1968 Lombank British F3 Championship for sponsorship reasons) was the 18th season of the British Formula 3 season. Australian driver Tim Schenken, driving for Sports Motors (Manchester), won the championship by 11 points from Tony Lanfranchi.

The Brabham BT21-Ford (and BT21B) dominated the grid with seven of the top ten drivers using the chassis, and winning eleven races. Tim Schenken, however, won the championship as one of the only participants driving the Chevron B9-Ford. The Lotus 41-Ford won one race and the Titan Mk.3-Ford won three races.

== Race Calendar and Results ==
Round	Circuit	Date	Pole position	Winning driver	Winning team
1	(United Kingdom) Mallory Park	10 March	(United Kingdom) Morris Nunn	(United Kingdom) Mike Keens	PM Racing Preparations
2	(United Kingdom) Oulton Park	16 March	(United Kingdom) Morris Nunn	(United Kingdom) Morris Nunn	Astrali Accessories
3	(United Kingdom) Snetterton	24 March	(United Kingdom) Charles Lucas	(United Kingdom) Charles Lucas	Charles Lucas Engineering
4	(United Kingdom) Snetterton	12 April	(United States) Roy Pike	(United Kingdom) Mike Walker	The Chequered Flag
5	(United Kingdom) Brands Hatch	15 April	(United States) Roy Pike	(United States) Roy Pike	Charles Lucas Engineering
6	(United Kingdom) Oulton Park	11 May	(United Kingdom) John Miles	(United Kingdom) Cyd WIlliams	Goodwin Racing
7	(United Kingdom) Mallory Park	12 May	(United Kingdom) John Miles	(United Kingdom) Cyd WIlliams	Goodwin Racing
8	(United Kingdom) Brands Hatch	19 May	N/A	(United States) Roy Pike	Charles Lucas Engineering
9	(United Kingdom) Brands Hatch	2 June	(United Kingdom) Harry Stiller	(Australia) Tim Schenken	Sports Motors (Manchester)
10	(United Kingdom) Oulton Park	15 June	(Australia) Tim Schenken	(Australia) Tim Schenken	Sports Motors (Manchester)
11	(United Kingdom) Brands Hatch	7 July	(United Kingdom) Richard Burton	(Japan) Tetsu Ikuzawa	Frank Williams Racing Cars
12	(United Kingdom) Oulton Park	13 July	(United Kingdom) Cyd Williams	(Australia) Tim Schenken	Sports Motors (Manchester)
13	(United Kingdom) Mallory Park	28 July	(Australia) Tim Schenken	(Japan) Tetsu Ikuzawa	Frank Williams Racing Cars
14	(United Kingdom) Mallory Park	11 August	(United Kingdom) Cyd Williams	(United Kingdom) Cyd Williams	Goodwin Racing
15	(United Kingdom) Brands Hatch	18 August	N/A	(United Kingdom) Tony Lanfranchi	Alan Fraser Racing
16	(United Kingdom) Oulton Park	14 September	(Australia) Tim Schenken	(Australia) Tim Schenken	Sports Motors (Manchester)
17	(United Kingdom) Oulton Park	28 September	(Australia) Tim Schenken	(Australia) Tim Schenken	Sports Motors (Manchester)
18	(United Kingdom) Brands Hatch	29 September	(Australia) Tim Schenken	(Australia) Tim Schenken	Sports Motors (Manchester)
19	(United Kingdom) Mallory Park	13 October	(Japan) Tetsu Ikuzawa	(Japan) Tetsu Ikuzawa	Frank Williams Racing Cars
20	(United Kingdom) Oulton Park	26 October	(United Kingdom) Bev Bond	(Australia) Tim Schenken	Sports Motors (Manchester)
21	(United Kingdom) Oulton Park	9 November	(Japan) Tetsu Ikuzawa	(Japan) Tetsu Ikuzawa	Frank Williams Racing Cars
22	(United Kingdom) Brands Hatch	24 November	N/A	(United Kingdom) Tony Lanfranchi	Alan Fraser Racing
23	(United Kingdom) Brands Hatch	27 December	(United Kingdom) Tony Lanfranchi	(United Kingdom) Tony Lanfranchi	Alan Fraser Racing

== Championship Standings ==
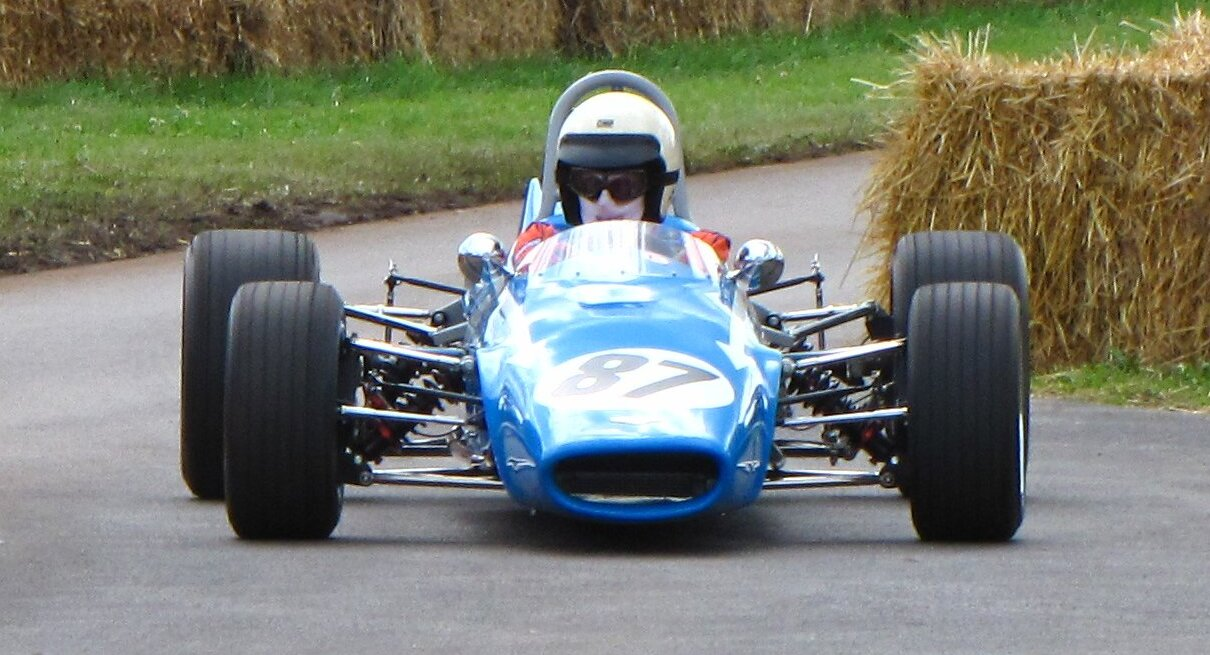
Tim Schenken won the championship in the Chevron B9

Place	Driver	Entrant	Total
1	(Australia) Tim Schenken	Sports Motors (Manchester)	80
2	(United Kingdom) Tony Lanfranchi	Alan Fraser Racing	69
3	(United Kingdom) Cyd Williams	Goodwin Racing	53
4	(Japan) Tetsu Ikuzawa	Frank Williams Racing Cars	51
5	(United Kingdom) Bev Bond	Jean Allen Racing	39
6	(United Kingdom) Dave Berry	Frank Lythgoe Racing	25
7	(United Kingdom) John Miles	John Miles	21
8	(United States) Roy Pike	Charles Lucas Engineering	19
9	(United Kingdom) Mike Beuttler	Mike Beuttler	18
10	(United Kingdom) Mike Keens	Mike Keens	17
