= Chevron B9 =

1968 Formula Three racecar

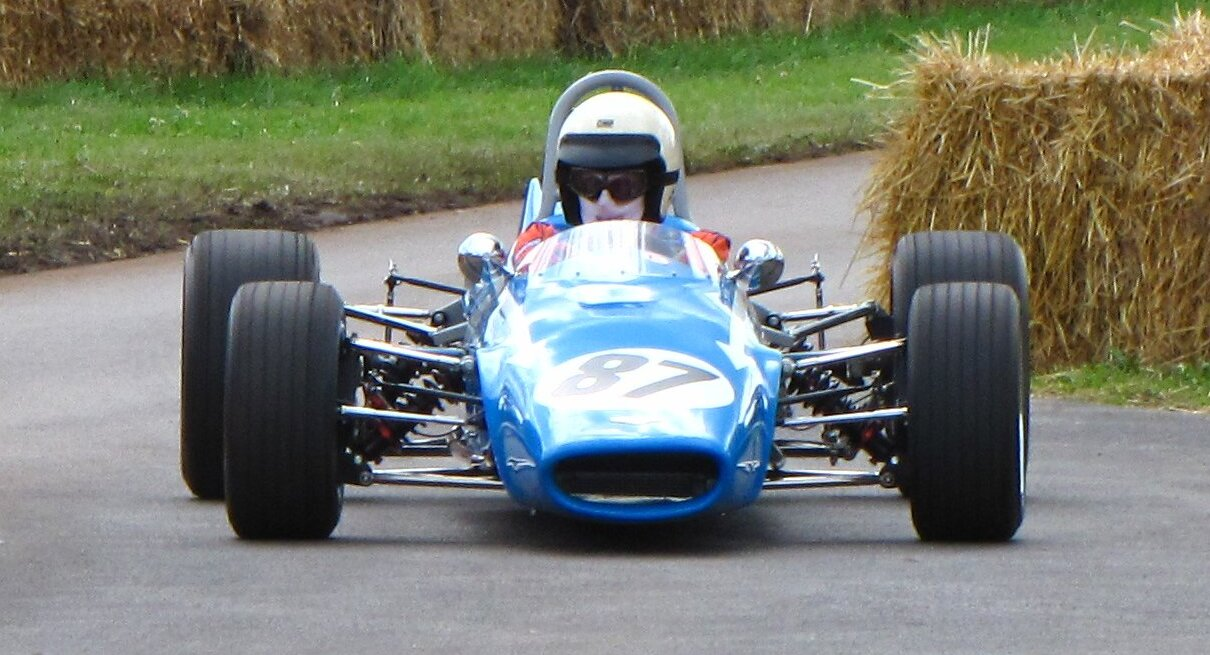
- A Chevron B9 at the 2009 Cholmondeley Pageant of Power
- Category: British Formula 3
- Production: 1968; 8 cars built
- Predecessor: Chevron B7
- Successor: Chevron B15

Technical specifications
- Chassis: Tubular space frame
- Engine: Cosworth MAE Straight-four engine
- Transmission: manual

Competition history
- Notable drivers: (Australia) Tim Schenken

The Chevron B9 is an open-wheel formula racing car, designed, developed and built by Chevron Cars, specifically designed to compete in Formula Three racing, in 1968. It was very successful, winning the 1968 British Formula Three Championship in its debut year, with Tim Schenken. It was originally powered by a 997 cc (60.8 cu in) Cosworth MAE four-cylinder engine, producing approximately 100–110 hp (75–82 kW).
