= Emerson Fittipaldi =

Brazilian racing driver (born 1946)

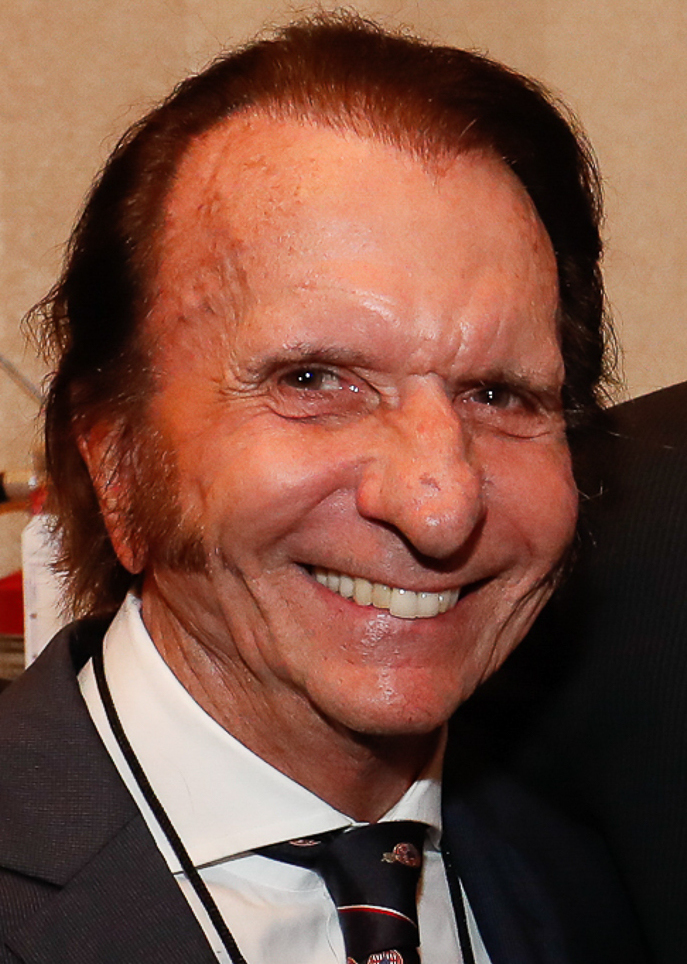
- Fittipaldi in 2020
- Born: 12 December 1946 (age 79); São Paulo, Brazil
- Spouses: Maria Helena (m. 1970; div. 1982) Teresa Hotte (m. 1983; div. 2002) Rossana Fanucchi (m. 2012)
- Children: 7, including Emerson Jr.
- Relatives: Wilson Fittipaldi Jr. (brother); Pietro Fittipaldi (grandson); Enzo Fittipaldi (grandson); Christian Fittipaldi (nephew); Max Papis (son-in-law)

Formula One World Championship career
- Nationality: (Brazil) Brazilian
- Active years: 1970–1980
- Team(s): Lotus, McLaren, Fittipaldi
- Entries: 149 (144 starts)
- Championships: 2 (1972, 1974)
- Wins: 14
- Podiums: 35
- Career points: 281
- Pole positions: 6
- Fastest laps: 6
- First entry: 1970 British Grand Prix
- First win: 1970 United States Grand Prix
- Last win: 1975 British Grand Prix
- Last entry: 1980 United States Grand Prix

Champ Car career
- 195 races run over 13 years
- Best finish: 1st (1989)
- First race: 1984 Long Beach Grand Prix (Long Beach)
- Last race: 1996 Michigan 500 (Michigan)
- First win: 1985 Michigan 500 (Michigan)
- Last win: 1995 Bosch Spark Plug Grand Prix (Nazareth)
Wins	Podiums	Poles
22	65	17

Signature
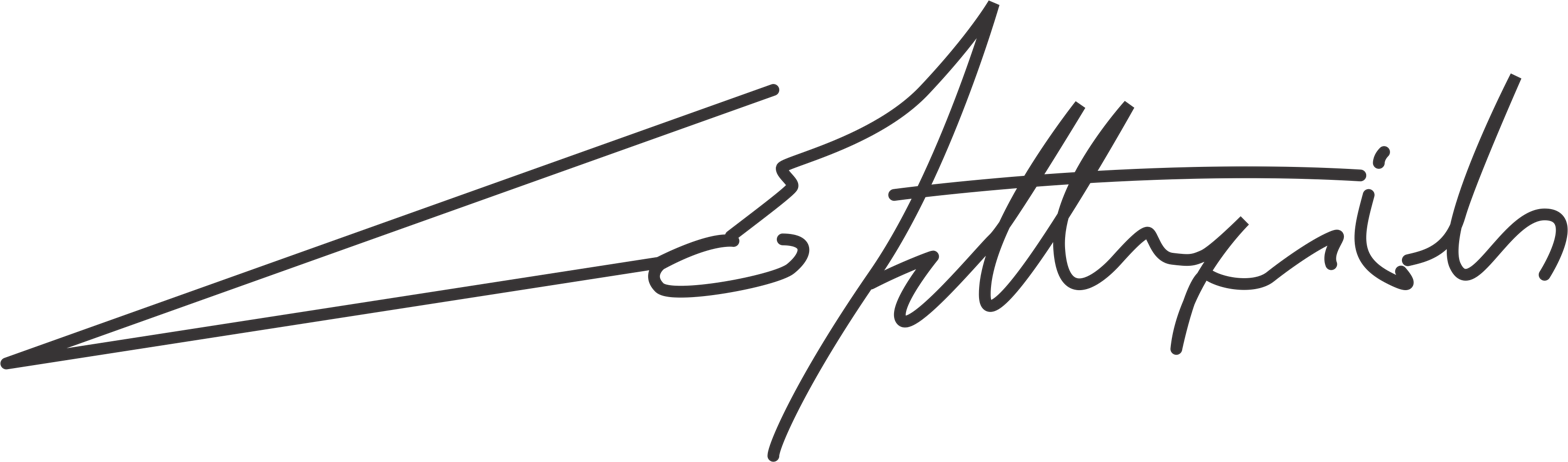

Emerson Fittipaldi (Brazilian Portuguese: [ˈɛmeʁsõ fitʃiˈpawdʒi]; born 12 December 1946) is a Brazilian former racing driver and motorsport executive, who competed in Formula One from 1970 to 1980. Fittipaldi won two Formula One World Drivers' Championship titles, in 1972 and 1974 with Lotus and McLaren, respectively; he won 14 Grands Prix across 11 seasons. In American open-wheel racing, Fittipaldi won the IndyCar World Series in 1989 with Patrick, and is a two-time winner of the Indianapolis 500.

Moving up from Formula Two, Fittipaldi made his race debut for Team Lotus as a third driver at the 1970 British Grand Prix. After Jochen Rindt was killed at the 1970 Italian Grand Prix, the Brazilian became Lotus's lead driver in only his fifth Grand Prix. He enjoyed considerable success with Lotus, winning the World Drivers' Championship in 1972 at the age of 25. At the time, he was the youngest ever F1 world champion, and he held the record for 33 years. He later moved to McLaren for 1974, winning the title once again, and helping McLaren win their first Constructors' Championship. He surprised the paddock by moving to his brother's Fittipaldi Automotive team prior to the 1976 season, being replaced by James Hunt. Success eluded him during his final years in Formula One, with the Fittipaldi cars not competitive enough to fight for victories. Fittipaldi took two more podium finishes, before retiring in 1980.

Following his Formula One career, Fittipaldi moved to the American CART series, achieving numerous successes, including the 1989 CART title and two wins at the Indianapolis 500 in 1989 and 1993. Since his retirement from Indy Car racing in 1996, Fittipaldi races only occasionally. In 2008, he became one of only three people in history to have a Corvette production car named in his honor. At age 67, he entered the 2014 6 Hours of São Paulo.

== Early life ==
Emerson Fittipaldi was born on 12 December 1946 in São Paulo, Brazil. He is the younger son of Italian-Brazilian motorsports journalist and radio commentator Wilson Fittipaldi Sr and his wife Józefa "Juzy" Wojciechowska, an immigrant from Saint Petersburg, Russia, of Polish and Russian descent.

Fittipaldi was named after American author and philosopher Ralph Waldo Emerson. Both of his parents had raced production cars shortly after World War II, and his father was responsible for the first Mil Milhas race in 1956, in São Paulo, having been inspired by the 1949 Italian Mille Miglia. Emerson, along with his brother Wilson, became motorsports enthusiasts as young children.

== Career history ==
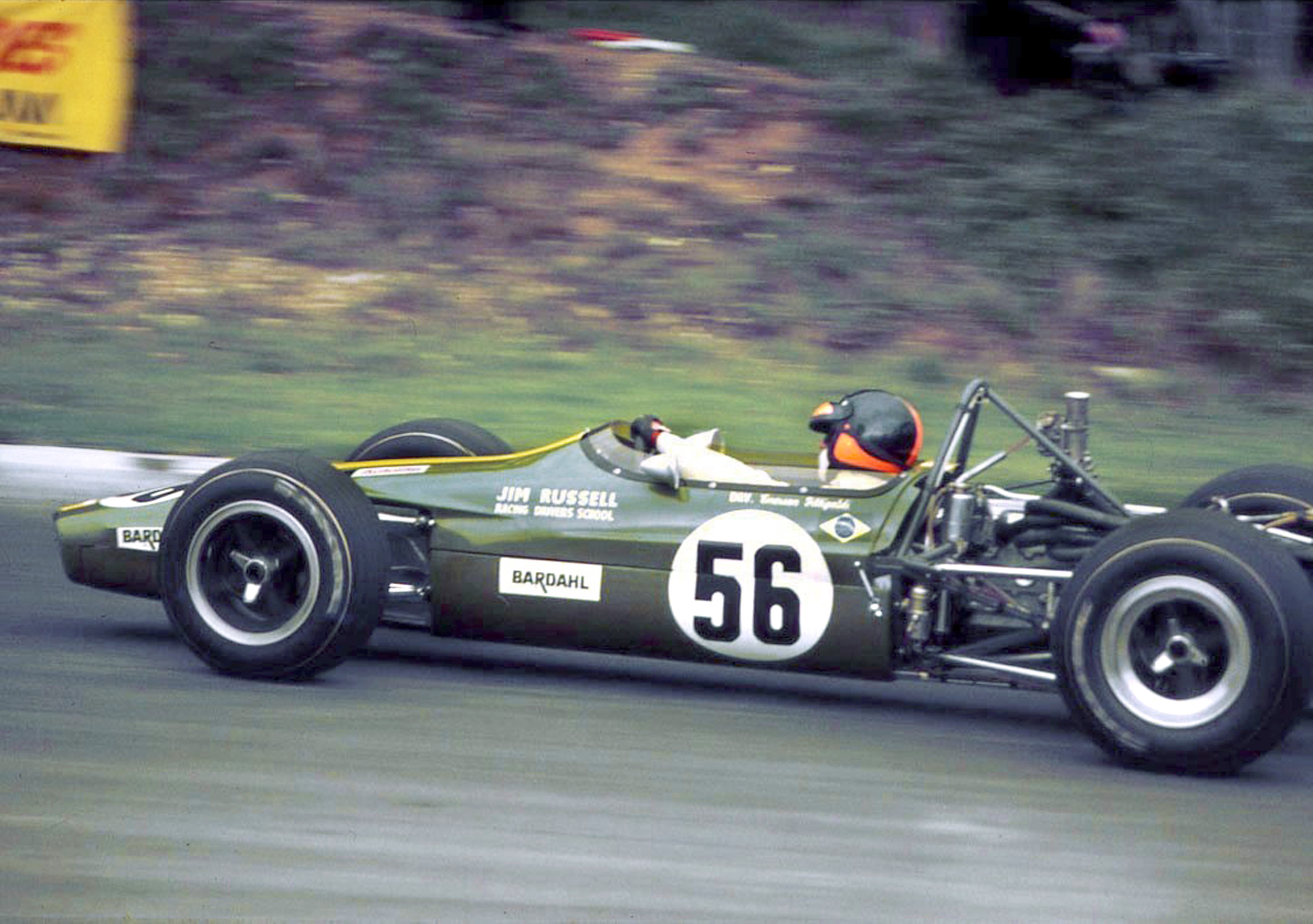
Fittipaldi driving the Jim Russell Racing Drivers School F3 Lotus 59 in the 1969 F3 Guards Trophy at Brands Hatch

At age 14, Fittipaldi was racing motorcycles, and at 16, hydroplanes. While racing one day, his brother Wilson blew over at 70 mph (110 km/h) and landed upside down. Wilson was uninjured in the accident, but it prompted both Fittipaldi brothers to stop competing in boat racing and focus solely on racing land vehicles. In 1967, Fittipaldi won the 6 Hours of Interlagos in a Volkswagen Karmann Ghia at the age of 20, and a year later the 12 Hours of Porto Alegre.

The pair moved to racing Formula Vees, and built up a company with their parents. In his second season in single-seaters, Fittipaldi won the Brazilian Formula Vee title at age 21. He left for Europe in 1969, with the ambition to convince team owners of his talent in three months. After some podiums and his first victories in Formula Ford, Fittipaldi was first trained and then subsequently engaged by the Jim Russell Driving School Formula Three team. He won nine F3 races on the Jim Russell Lotus 59 in the MCD Lombard Championship to become the 1969 champion.

=== Formula Two ===
For 1970, Fittipaldi moved up to F2 by joining the Lotus semi-works Team Bardahl campaigning Lotus 59B. With six finishes in the points and four on the podium, he ended the eight-race season in third place behind Clay Regazzoni and Derek Bell. While this result was very impressive for the newcomer to the series, the spotlight was on Fittipaldi that year because of his activities in Formula One instead.

=== Formula One ===
==== Lotus (1970–1973) ====
Based on the success of the Cosworth DFV engine and Lotus 49/49B cars in 1968, Team Lotus was enjoying the reputation as one of the top F1 teams with the inflow of sponsorship money, and Colin Chapman used the third seat on the team for championship races as the testing ground for younger drivers. This was in contrast to the team's tradition to use non-championship F1 events for the purpose.

The third seat was given to Alex Soler-Roig in early 1970, and then to Fittipaldi starting with the British GP in July, with Jochen Rindt and John Miles as the regular seat holders. Fittipaldi scored a fourth place as the No. 3 driver at the next German GP where the No. 1 Jochen Rindt won, and the No. 2 John Miles retired.

Team Lotus plans for the season drastically changed when Jochen Rindt was killed at Monza in September and became the only driver to win the championship posthumously. John Miles also left the team, and Fittipaldi was promoted to be the Lotus No. 1 driver on his fifth F1 race at the United States GP with Reine Wisell and Pete Lovely as the teammates. Fittipaldi proved up to the task and won this first post-Rindt race for Lotus.

In his first full year as Lotus's lead driver in 1971, Fittipaldi finished sixth in the Drivers' Championship as the team further developed the previous season's Lotus 72. Fittipaldi proved dominant in 1972, as he won five of 11 races and claimed the F1 Drivers' Championship.

At 25, Fittipaldi was then the youngest champion in F1 history. It appeared he might do it again in 1973. After three wins in four attempts with the 72D, he began to struggle in the new 72E that was unveiled mid-year. It resulted in the reverse of the previous year, with Jackie Stewart beating Fittipaldi for the Drivers' Championship.

==== McLaren (1974–1975) ====
Fittipaldi left Lotus to sign with the promising McLaren team. Driving the highly efficient McLaren M23, he had three victories in 1974, reached the podium four other times, and beat out Clay Regazzoni in a close battle for his second championship. The following season, he notched two more victories and four other podiums, but was second to a dominant Niki Lauda.

==== Fittipaldi (1976–1980) ====
However, at the height of his F1 success, Fittipaldi shocked everyone by leaving McLaren to race for older brother Wilson Fittipaldi's Copersucar-sponsored Fittipaldi Automotive team.

Fittipaldi remained with the team for five seasons but only managed a best finish of second. Fittipaldi decided to retire from racing at the end of 1980. He has since said that his last two years in Formula One were very unhappy: "I was too involved in the problems of trying to make the team work, and I neglected my marriage and my personal life", although at the time he cited the deaths of many of his colleagues as his reason. He was only 33, but had been racing in Formula One for a decade. He had failed to finish seven of the last ten races that year and had several times been outpaced by his Finnish teammate Keke Rosberg (a future champion himself). He moved into the management of the team alongside his brother. The team struggled on for another two years with minimal sponsorship, going into receivership at the end of 1982.

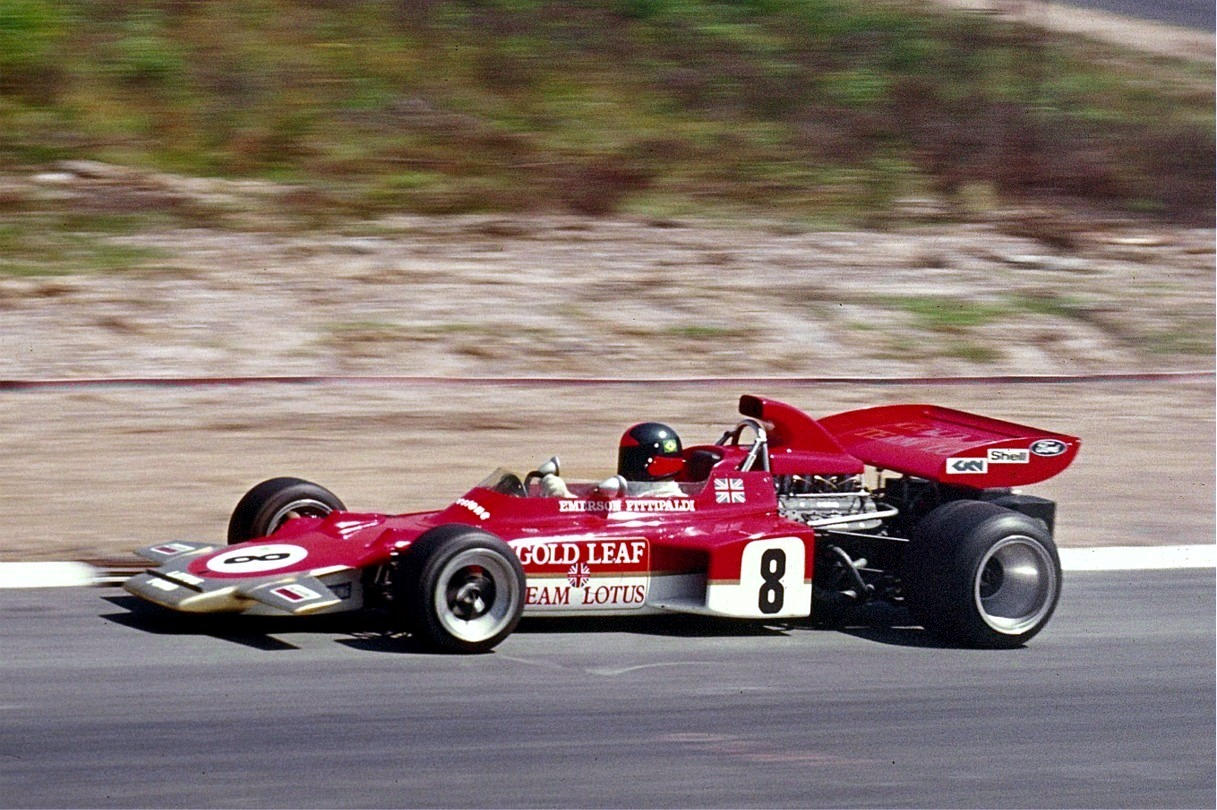
Fittipaldi driving the Lotus 72 at the Nürburgring in 1971

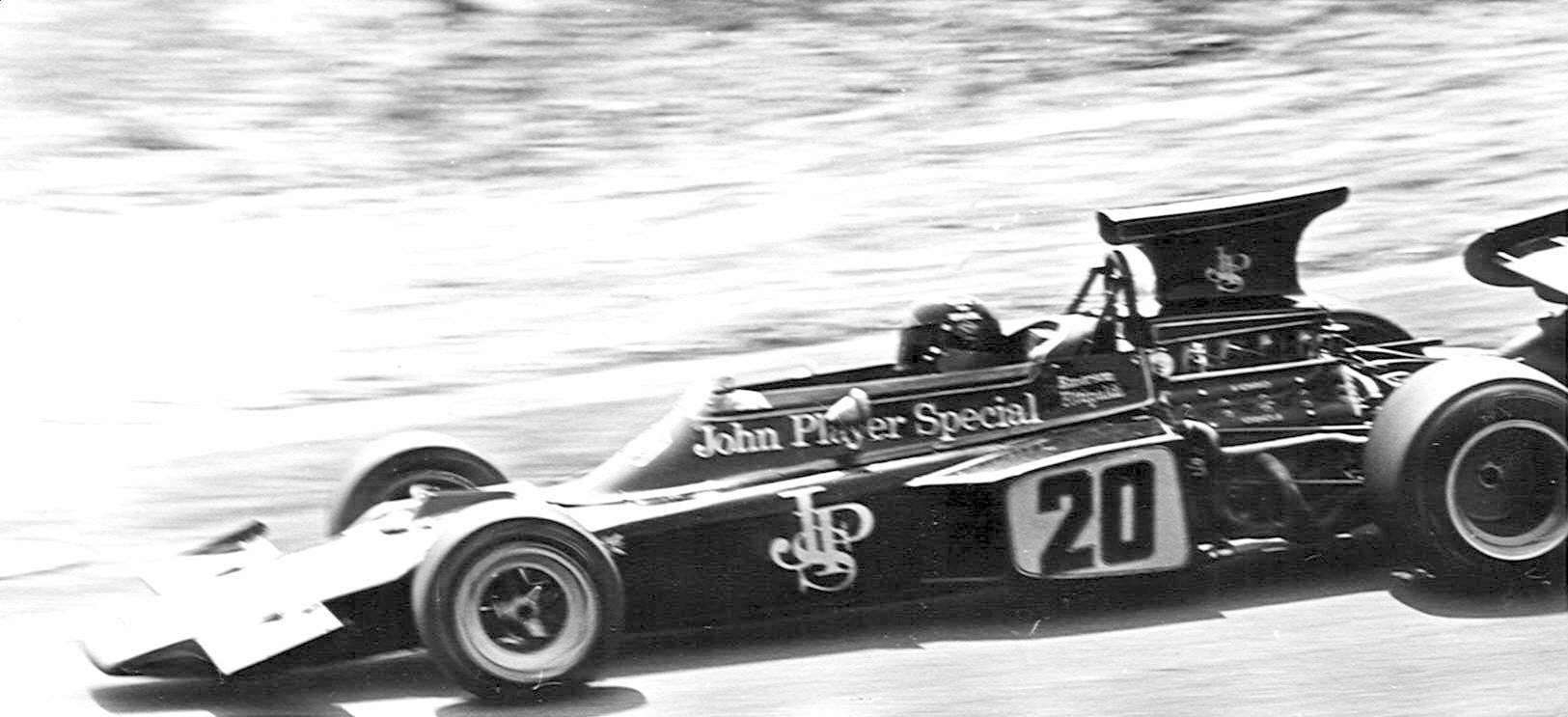
Fittipaldi at the wheel of the Lotus 72D at the 1972 Austrian Grand Prix

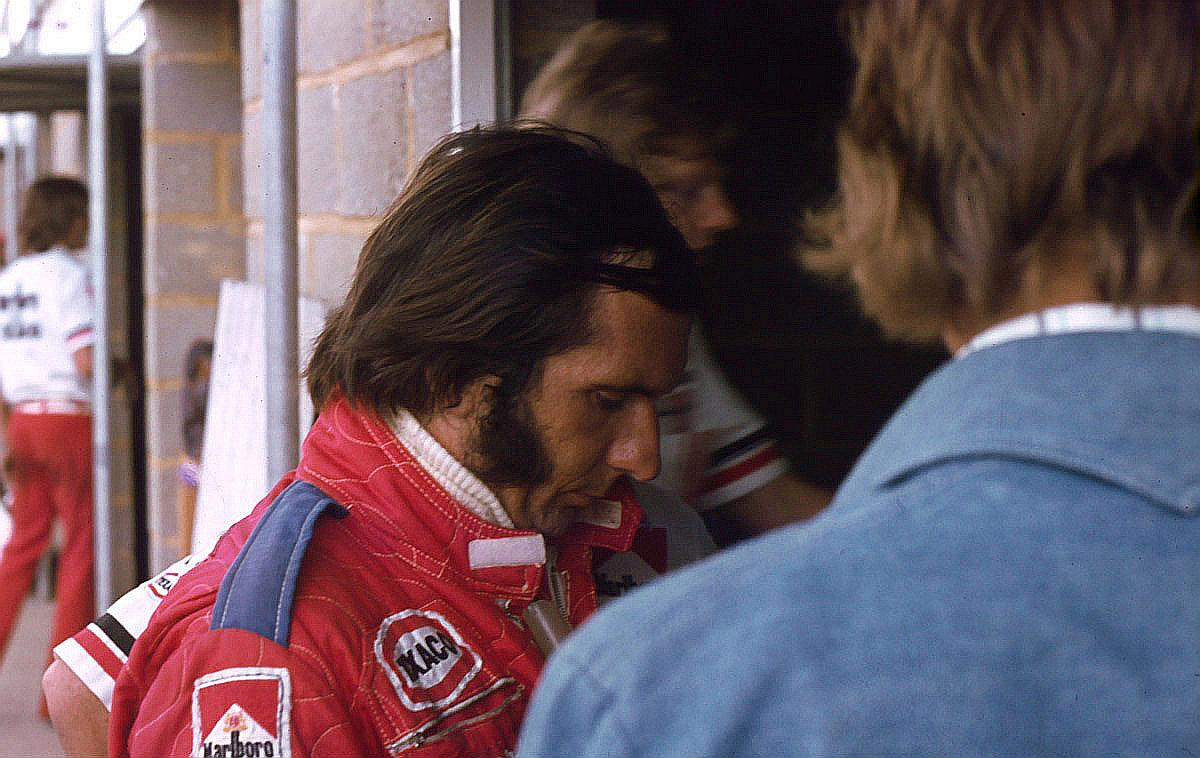
Fittipaldi at Silverstone in 1974

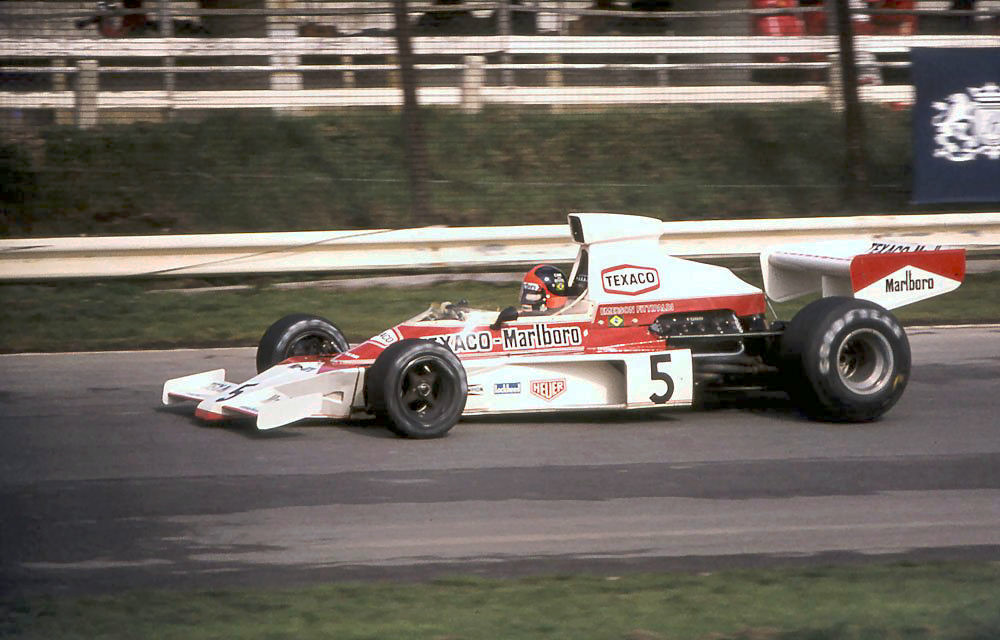
Fittipaldi in the McLaren M23 in the 1974 Race of Champions at Brands Hatch

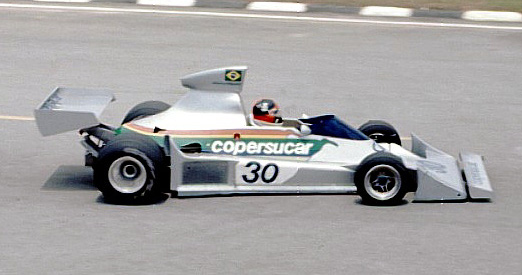
Fittipaldi driving for his brother's eponymous team at the 1976 Brazilian Grand Prix at his home circuit, Interlagos

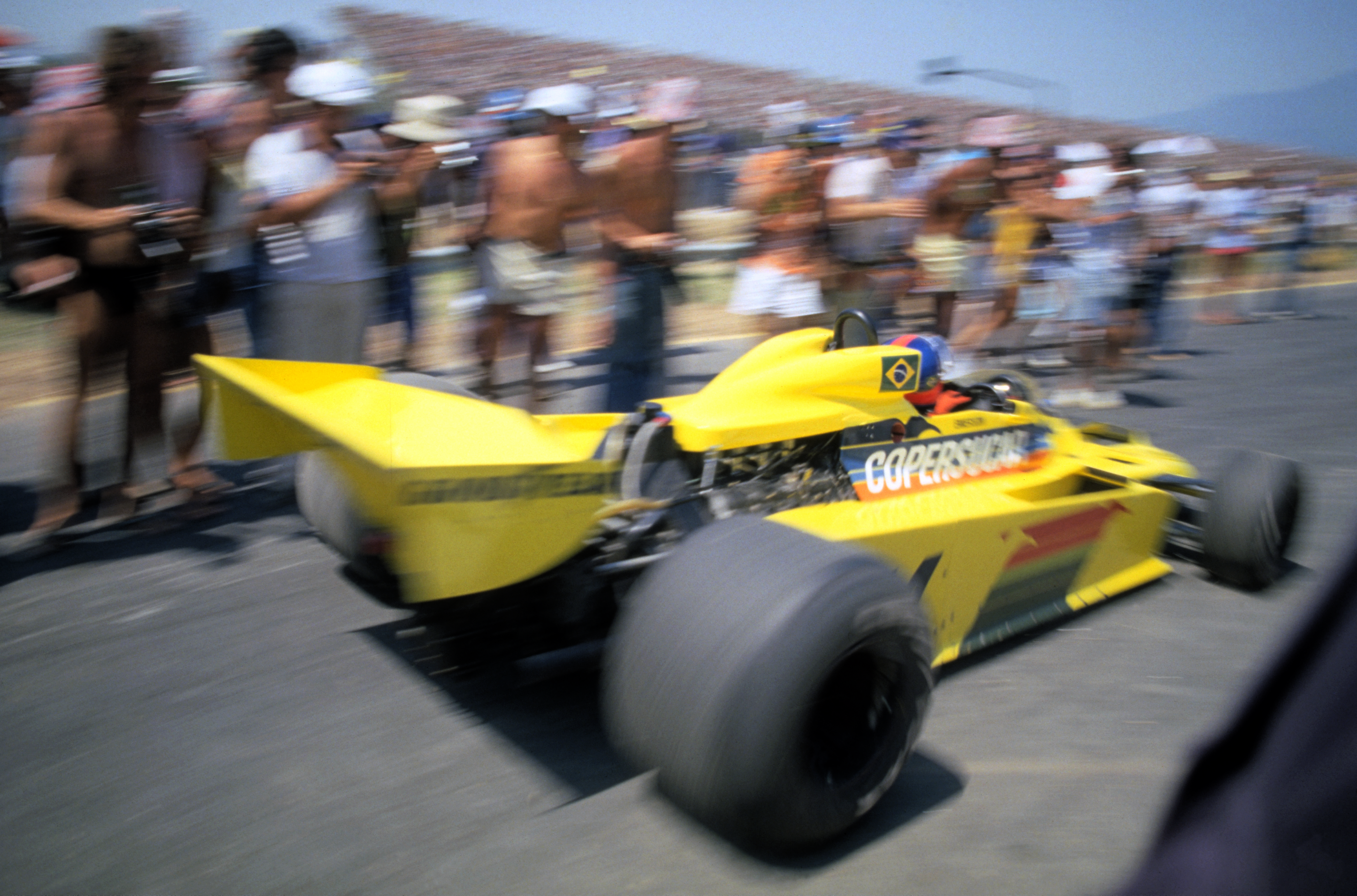
Fittipaldi Copersucar, Jacarepaguá, 1978

=== CART ===
After leaving F1 in 1980, Fittipaldi took time out from major racing for four years. In 1984, the 37-year-old Fittipaldi made his debut in the American CART series. He spent his first season acclimatising to IndyCars, driving for two teams before joining Patrick Racing as a replacement for Chip Ganassi, who had been seriously injured in the 1984 Michigan 500. The 1985 Michigan 500 marked Fittipaldi's first victory in CART. Fittipaldi stayed five years with Patrick Racing, recording six victories and solid finishes in the overall standings.

In 1989, Fittipaldi had five wins, finished in the top five in every race he completed, and was the CART champion. Among his wins was a dominant performance in the 1989 Indianapolis 500, where he led 158 of 200 laps and won by two laps, but only after a dramatic duel with Al Unser Jr. in the closing laps of the race. Unser ran down Fittipaldi after a late-race restart and passed him for the lead on lap 196. Three laps later, Fittipaldi used lapped traffic to his advantage to pull alongside Unser on the backstretch. Neither driver would give way, and the two cars touched wheels as they went through turn three side by side. Unser's car spun out of control to hit the outside wall, while Fittipaldi was able to maintain sufficient control to keep his car moving straight. In spite of the altercation, Unser applauded Fittipaldi from the infield as Fittipaldi passed by on the final lap.

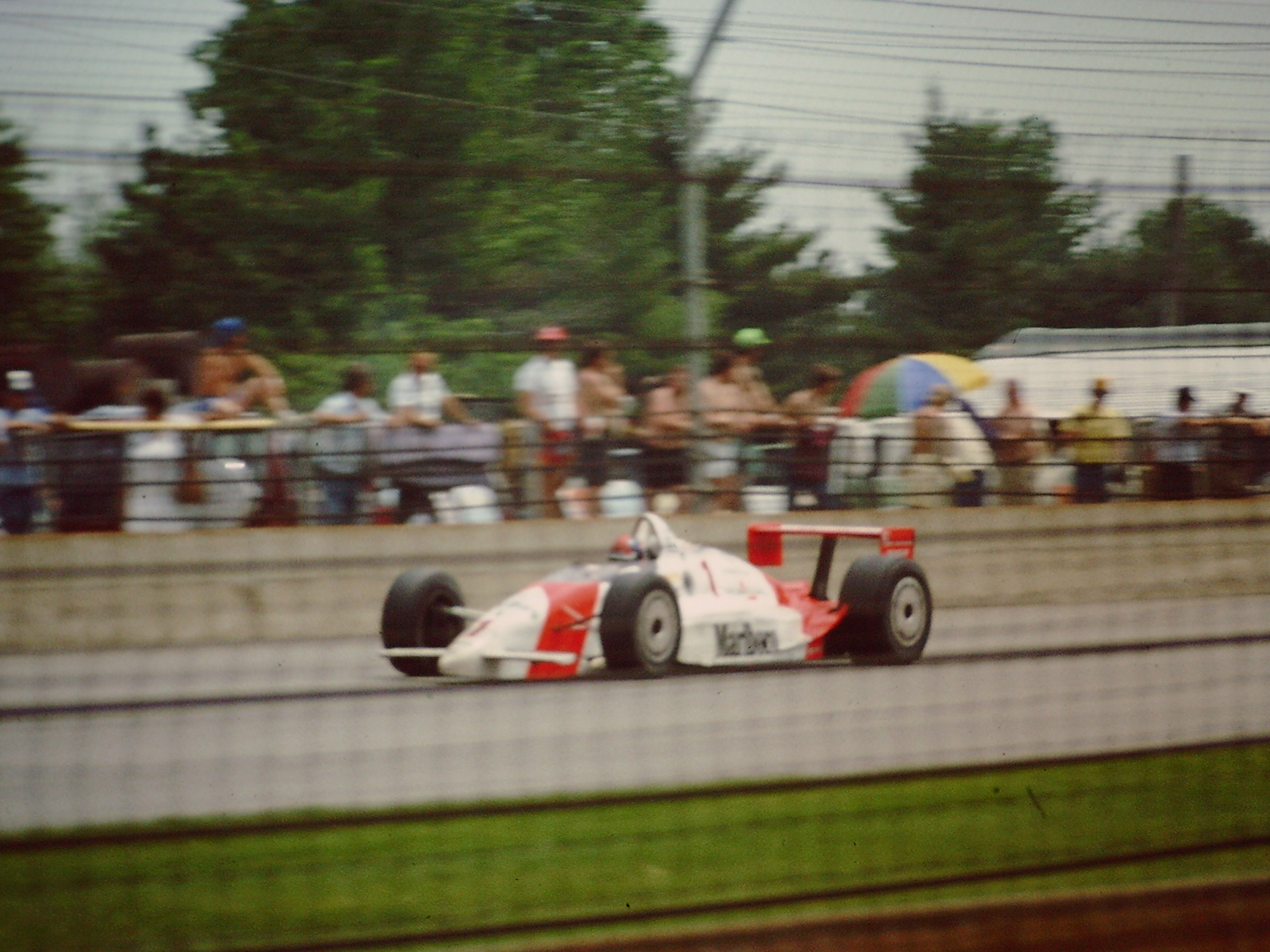
Fittipaldi during the 1990 Indianapolis 500

Roger Penske hired Fittipaldi for his racing team in 1990 and he continued to be among the top drivers in CART, winning at least one race with Penske for six straight years. But for bad luck he might have won three consecutive Indianapolis 500s, suffering blistered tires in 1990 and a gearbox failure in 1991, both while leading. In 1993 he added a second Indianapolis 500 victory by taking the lead from reigning Formula One World Champion Nigel Mansell on lap 185 and holding it for the remainder.

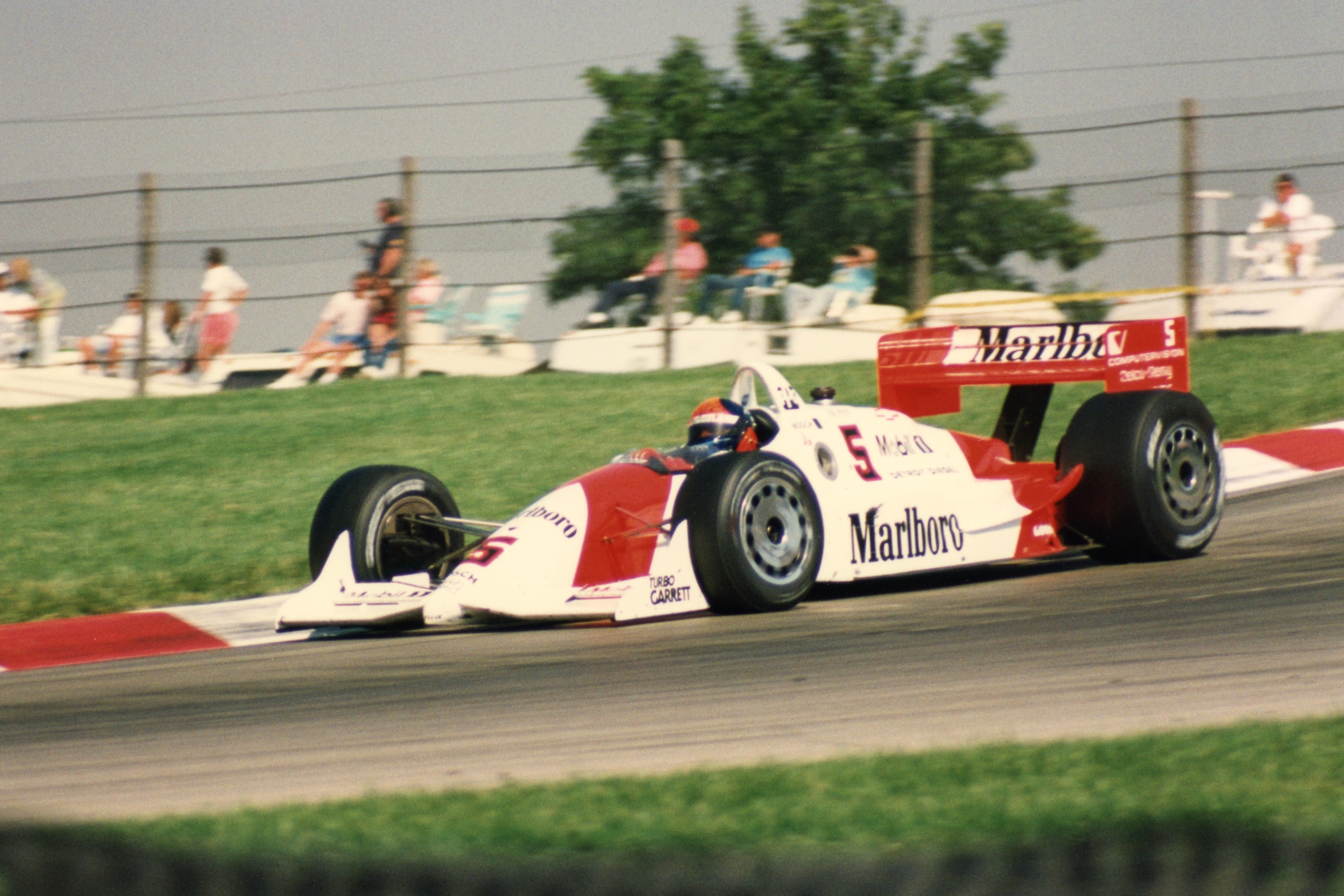
Fittipaldi navigating the Keyhole section at Mid-Ohio Sports Car Course in 1992

The race saw Fittipaldi break Indianapolis victory lane tradition when he drank a celebratory bottle of orange juice before the traditional bottle of milk. He was only the second driver to not drink milk at Indianapolis since the tradition was founded in 1936 (and firmly established in 1956). Fittipaldi owned several orange groves in his native Brazil, and wanted to promote the citrus industry. Fan reaction was negative to the break in tradition despite the fact that Fittipaldi did drink milk shortly after. As a result of drinking the juice, Fittipaldi forfeited $5,000 from the winner's purse and publicly apologized to the American Dairy Association.

Fan reaction to the milk snub was highly negative, and he was booed a week later at Milwaukee, a center of the American dairy industry. In the years that followed, many fans continued to hold the action against him. In interviews since, Fittipaldi explained his action, and apologised for the wave of negativity that followed. Fittipaldi returned to Indianapolis to drive the Chevrolet Corvette Pace Car for the 2008 Indianapolis 500. Despite the passage of 15 years, he was again booed and heckled by some fans during the parade laps.

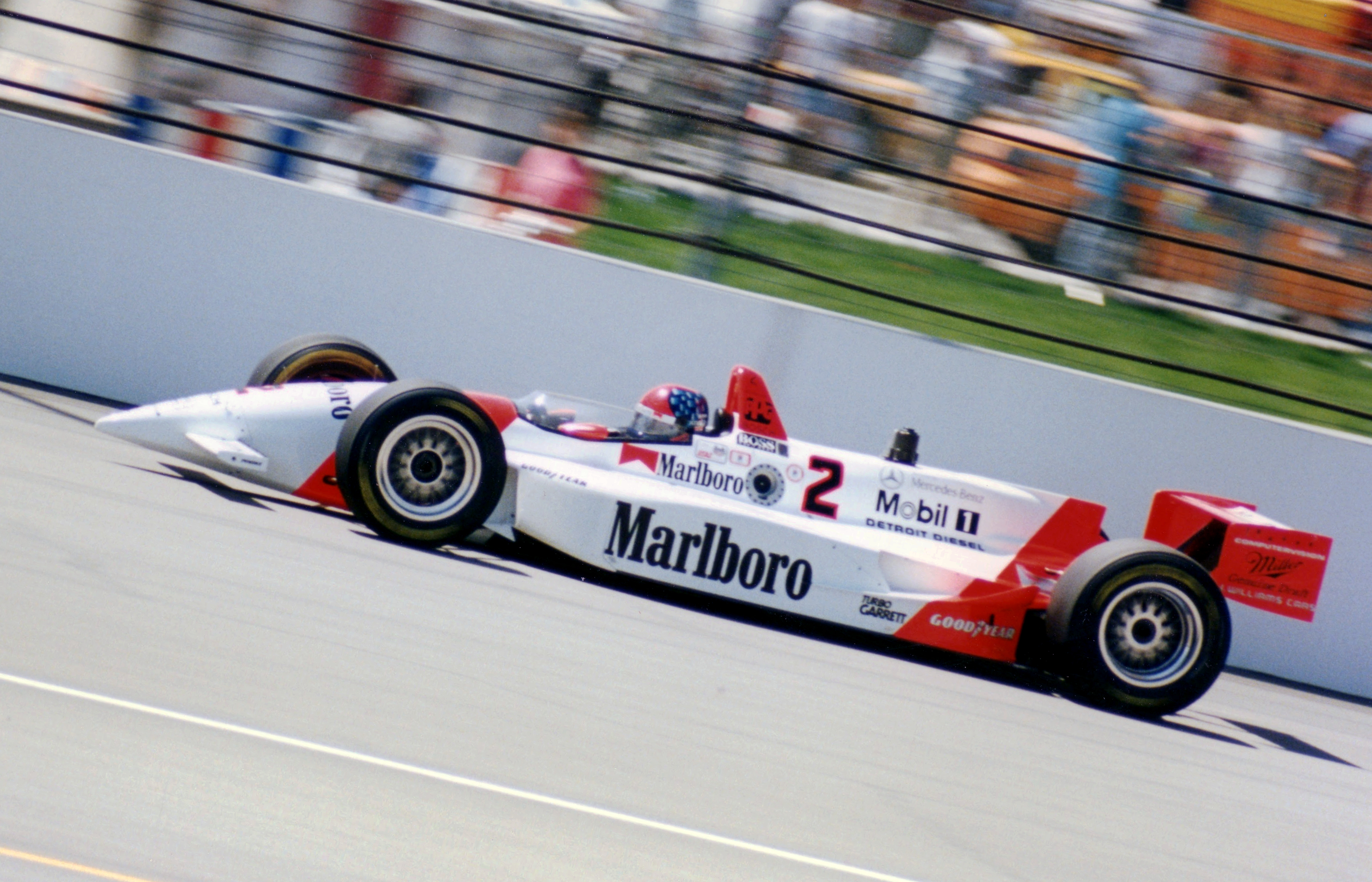
Fittipaldi racing in the Indianapolis 500 in 1994

In May 1994, Fittipaldi skipped a practice session for the Indianapolis 500 after his close friend Ayrton Senna, also a native of Brazil and a former Formula One champion, died in a crash. Fittipaldi was one of the pallbearers during Senna's funeral, alongside Jackie Stewart, Alain Prost and several other F1 world champions. Fittipaldi nearly won his third 500 but clipped the turn 4 wall with 15 laps to go while he was holding a nearly full lap lead over teammate Unser Jr.

Approaching 50, Fittipaldi was still driving in CART in 1996 when an injury at Michigan International Speedway ended his career. Fittipaldi did not return to the series as a driver after the injury. Fittipaldi finished his CART career with 22 wins. In 2003 he made a return to CART as a team owner.

=== Later career ===
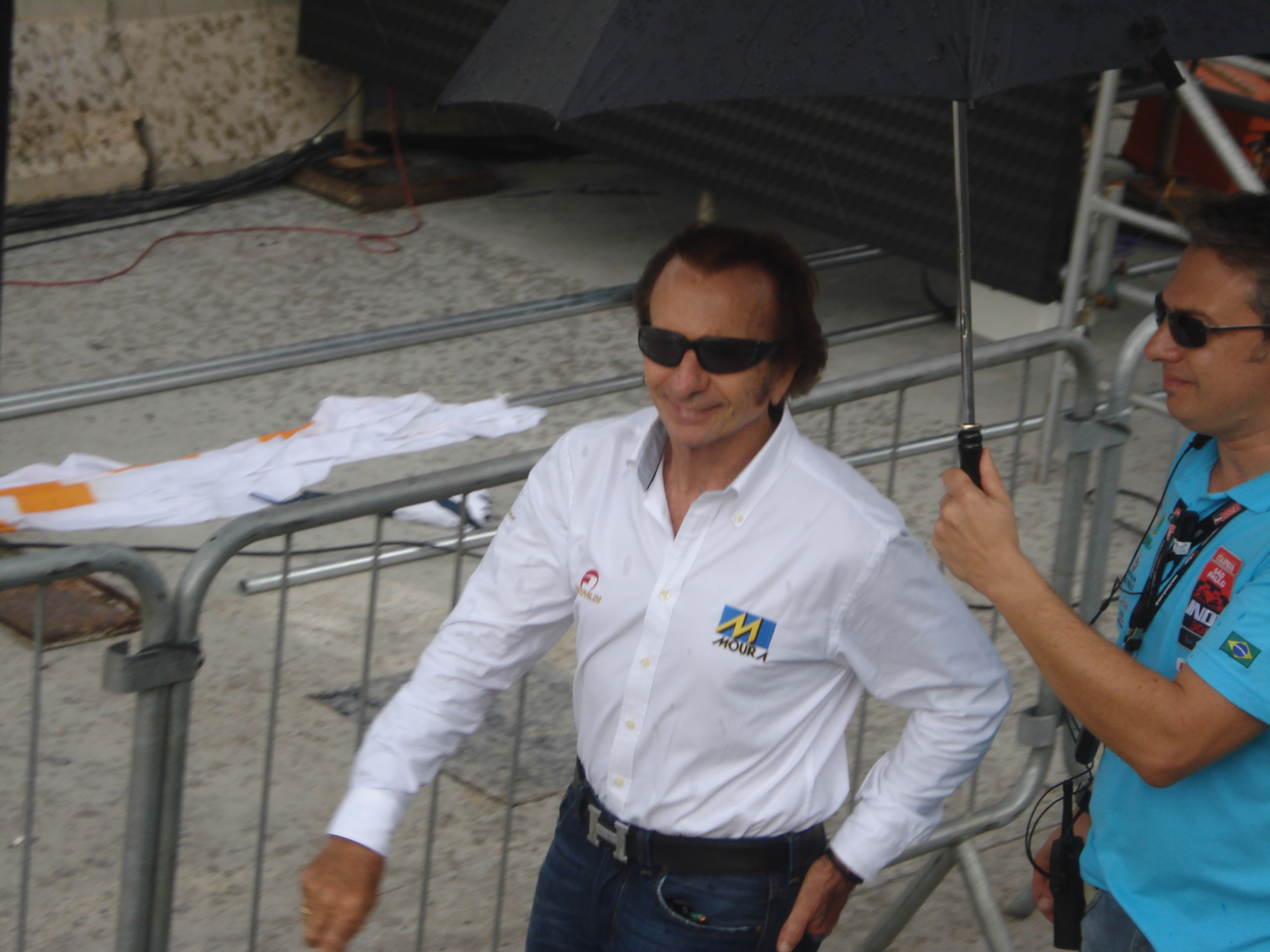
Fittipaldi at the 2011 São Paulo Indy 300. He waved the green flag at the start of the race.

Fittipaldi was the acting team principal for the Brazilian A1 GP entry. In 2005 Fittipaldi made a surprise return to competitive racing in the Grand Prix Masters event held at Kyalami in South Africa, finishing second behind fellow F1 driver Nigel Mansell.

In 2008, Emerson and his brother Wilson entered the Brazilian GT3 Championship, driving a Porsche 997 GT3 for the WB Motorsports team. In 2011, he started embracing social media and became a Chairman of Motorsport.com. In 2013 he began writing a regular monthly blog column on the official website of McLaren.

=== Awards ===
- Fittipaldi was inducted in the Motorsports Hall of Fame of America in 2001.
- Fittipaldi was inducted into the Indianapolis Motor Speedway Hall of Fame in 2004.

== Personal life ==
=== Family ===
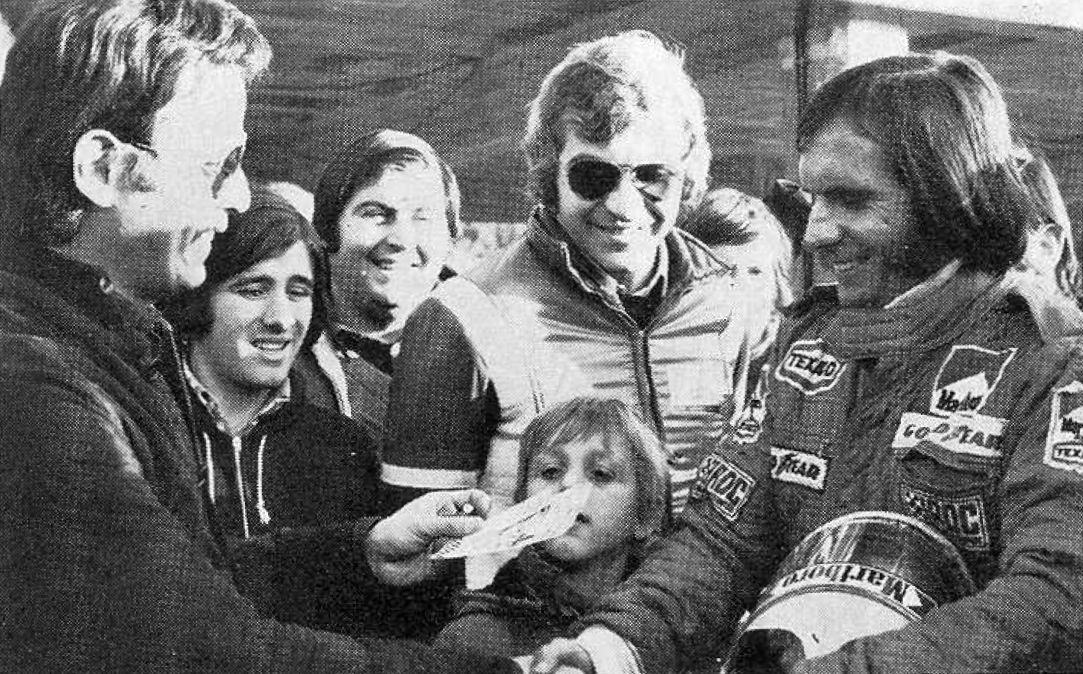
Fittipaldi with Italian fans at Mugello in 1974

Fittipaldi is the younger brother of former Formula One driver and team owner Wilson Fittipaldi. He is the uncle of International Formula 3000 and IMSA champion Christian Fittipaldi. He was married to Maria Helena from 1970 to 1982. They had three children. He was married a second time, to Teresa, in the mid-1980s. They have two children.

In early December 2012, Fittipaldi married economist Rossana Fanucchi in São Paulo after a partnership of eleven years. Their children include Emerson Jr.. Emerson Jr. competed in the 2021 F4 Danish Championship, finishing third overall.

His daughter Tatiana married racing driver Max Papis.

His daughter Juliana had two sons: Pietro and Enzo. Pietro and Enzo are also racing drivers, with Enzo being announced as a member of the Red Bull Junior Team in November 2022. Pietro made his Formula 1 debut at the 2020 Sakhir Grand Prix driving for the Haas F1 Team. For 2024, he was signed to run a full IndyCar schedule with Rahal Letterman Lanigan Racing.

=== Life ===
In September 1997, while recovering from injuries in a crash at Michigan International Speedway a year earlier, Fittipaldi was flying his private plane across his orange tree farm in the state of São Paulo. The plane lost power and plunged 90 metres (300 ft) to the ground, leaving him with serious back injuries. Though Fittipaldi had converted to Christianity the year prior, his beliefs were reinforced after the crash. Fittipaldi is a Presbyterian.

Fittipaldi was a friend of the Beatles guitarist George Harrison, and was with him shortly before he died in November 2001.

In 2016, Fittipaldi established Fittipaldi Motors and, along with Pininfarina and HWA AG, created his first sports car project, the Fittipaldi EF7, though the car never entered production.

In August 2022, Fittipaldi announced his candidacy for the Italian Senate, representing the South American overseas constituency, running as a member of the Brothers of Italy political party, being eventually defeated by Italo-Argentine Mario Borghese a month later in the 2022 Italian parliamentary elections.

== Racing record ==
=== Career summary ===
Season	Series	Team	Races	Wins	Poles	F/Laps	Podiums	Points	Position
1969	British Formula Three	Jim Russell Racing Driver School	11	7	1	4	9	57	**1st**
1970	European Formula Two	Lotus Components Team Bardahl	6	0	0	0	4	25	**3rd**
1970	Formula One	Gold Leaf Team Lotus	5	1	0	0	1	12	10th
1971	Formula One	Gold Leaf Team Lotus	9	0	0	0	3	16	6th
1971	Formula One	World Wide Racing	1	0	0	0	0	16	6th
1972	Formula One	John Player Team Lotus	11	4	3	0	7	61	**1st**
1972	Formula One	World Wide Racing	1	1	0	0	1	61	**1st**
1973	Formula One	John Player Team Lotus	15	3	1	5	8	55	**2nd**
1974	Formula One	Marlboro Team Texaco	15	3	2	0	7	55	**1st**
1975	Formula One	Marlboro Team McLaren	13	2	0	1	6	45	**2nd**
1976	Formula One	Copersucar-Fittipaldi	15	0	0	0	0	3	17th
1977	Formula One	Copersucar-Fittipaldi	14	0	0	0	0	11	12th
1978	Formula One	Fittipaldi Automotive	16	0	0	0	1	17	10th
1979	Formula One	Fittipaldi Automotive	15	0	0	0	0	1	21st
1980	Formula One	Skol Fittipaldi Automotive	14	0	0	0	1	5	15th
1983-84	USAC Championship Car	GTS Racing	1	0	0	0	0	5	37th
1984	PPG Indy Car World Series	WIT Racing	3	0	0	0	0	30	15th
1984	PPG Indy Car World Series	H&R Racing	2	0	0	0	0	30	15th
1984	PPG Indy Car World Series	Patrick Racing	4	0	0	0	0	30	15th
1985	PPG Indy Car World Series	Patrick Racing	15	1	0	0	4	104	6th
1985	24 Hours of Daytona	Ralph Sanchez Racing	0	0	0	0	0	N/A	NC
1986	PPG Indy Car World Series	Patrick Racing	17	1	2	0	5	103	7th
1987	PPG Indy Car World Series	Patrick Racing	15	2	0	0	3	78	10th
1988	PPG Indy Car World Series	Patrick Racing	15	2	1	0	5	105	7th
1989	PPG Indy Car World Series	Patrick Racing	15	5	4	0	8	196	**1st**
1990	PPG Indy Car World Series	Team Penske	16	1	2	0	6	144	5th
1991	PPG Indy Car World Series	Team Penske	17	1	2	0	6	140	5th
1992	PPG Indy Car World Series	Team Penske	16	4	2	3	7	151	4th
1993	PPG Indy Car World Series	Team Penske	16	3	2	3	9	183	**2nd**
1994	PPG Indy Car World Series	Team Penske	16	1	2	4	10	178	**2nd**
1995	PPG Indy Car World Series	Team Penske	16	1	0	2	2	67	11th
1996	PPG Indy Car World Series	Hogan Penske	12	0	0	1	0	29	19th
2014	FIA World Endurance Championship - GTE Am	AF Corse	1	0	0	0	0	8	23rd

=== Complete Formula One World Championship results ===
(key) (Races in bold indicate pole position, races in italics indicate fastest lap)

Year	Entrant	Chassis	Engine	1	2	3	4	5	6	7	8	9	10	11	12	13	14	15	16	17	WDC	Pts.
1970	Gold Leaf Team Lotus	Lotus 49C	Ford V8	RSA	ESP	MON	BEL	NED	FRA	GBR; 8	GER; 4	AUT; 15									10th	12
1970	Gold Leaf Team Lotus	Lotus 72C	Ford V8										ITA; DNS	CAN	USA; 1	MEX; Ret					10th	12
1971	Gold Leaf Team Lotus	Lotus 72C	Ford V8	RSA; Ret	ESP; Ret																6th	16
1971	Gold Leaf Team Lotus	Lotus 72D	Ford V8			MON; 5	NED	FRA; 3	GBR; 3	GER; Ret	AUT; 2		CAN; 7	USA; NC							6th	16
1971	World Wide Racing	Lotus 56B	P&W gas turbine									ITA; 8									6th	16
1972	John Player Team Lotus	Lotus 72D	Ford V8	ARG; Ret	RSA; 2	ESP; 1	**MON**; 3	**BEL**; 1	FRA; 2	GBR; 1	GER; Ret	**AUT**; 1		CAN; 11	USA; Ret						**1st**	**61**
1972	World Wide Racing	Lotus 72D	Ford V8										ITA; 1								**1st**	**61**
1973	John Player Team Lotus	Lotus 72D	Ford V8	ARG; 1	BRA; 1	RSA; 3															**2nd**	**55**
1973	John Player Team Lotus	Lotus 72E	Ford V8				ESP; 1	BEL; 3	MON; 2	SWE; 12	FRA; Ret	GBR; Ret	NED; Ret	GER; 6	**AUT**; Ret	ITA; 2	CAN; 2	USA; 6			**2nd**	**55**
1974	Marlboro Team Texaco	McLaren M23B	Ford V8	ARG; 10	**BRA**; 1	RSA; 7	ESP; 3	BEL; 1	MON; 5	SWE; 4	NED; 3	FRA; Ret	GBR; 2	GER; Ret	AUT; Ret	ITA; 2	**CAN**; 1	USA; 4			**1st**	**55**
1975	Marlboro Team McLaren	McLaren M23C	Ford V8	ARG; 1	BRA; 2	RSA; NC	ESP; DNS	MON; 2	BEL; 7	SWE; 8	NED; Ret	FRA; 4	GBR; 1	GER; Ret	AUT; 9	ITA; 2	USA; 2				**2nd**	**45**
1976	Copersucar-Fittipaldi	Fittipaldi FD04	Ford V8	BRA; 13	RSA; 17	USW; 6	ESP; Ret	BEL; DNQ	MON; 6	SWE; Ret	FRA; Ret	GBR; 6	GER; 13	AUT; Ret	NED; Ret	ITA; 15	CAN; Ret	USA; 9	JPN; Ret		17th	3
1977	Copersucar-Fittipaldi	Fittipaldi FD04	Ford V8	ARG; 4	BRA; 4	RSA; 10	USW; 5	ESP; 14	MON; Ret		SWE; 18										12th	11
1977	Copersucar-Fittipaldi	Fittipaldi F5	Ford V8							BEL; Ret		FRA; 11	GBR; Ret	GER; DNQ	AUT; 11	NED; 4	ITA; DNQ	USA; 13	CAN; Ret	JPN; WD	12th	11
1978	Fittipaldi Automotive	Fittipaldi F5A	Ford V8	ARG; 9	BRA; 2	RSA; Ret	USW; 8	MON; 9	BEL; Ret	ESP; Ret	SWE; 6	FRA; Ret	GBR; Ret	GER; 4	AUT; 4	NED; 5	ITA; 8	USA; 5	CAN; Ret		10th	17
1979	Fittipaldi Automotive	Fittipaldi F5A	Ford V8	ARG; 6	BRA; 11		USW; Ret	ESP; 11	BEL; 9	MON; Ret	FRA; Ret	GBR; Ret									21st	1
1979	Fittipaldi Automotive	Fittipaldi F6	Ford V8			RSA; 13															21st	1
1979	Fittipaldi Automotive	Fittipaldi F6A	Ford V8										GER; Ret	AUT; Ret	NED; Ret	ITA; 8	CAN; 8	USA; 7			21st	1
1980	Skol Fittipaldi Team	Fittipaldi F7	Ford V8	ARG; NC	BRA; 15	RSA; 8	USW; 3	BEL; Ret	MON; 6	FRA; Ret											15th	5
1980	Skol Fittipaldi Team	Fittipaldi F8	Ford V8								GBR; 12	GER; Ret	AUT; 11	NED; Ret	ITA; Ret	CAN; Ret	USA; Ret				15th	5

=== Non-championship Formula One results ===
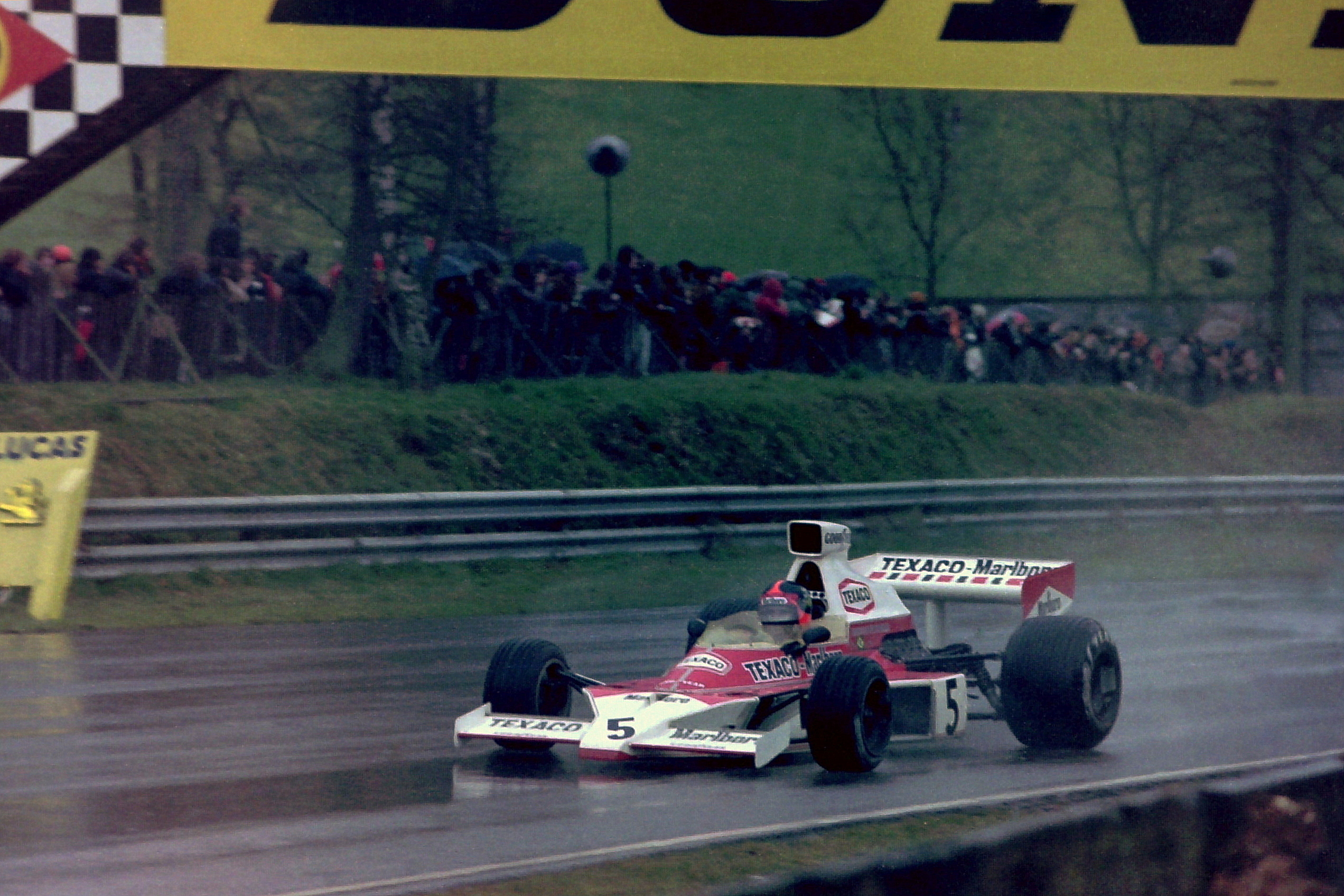
Fittipaldi at the 1974 Race of Champions

(key) (Races in bold indicate pole position) (Races in italics indicate fastest lap)

Year	Entrant	Chassis	Engine	1	2	3	4	5	6	7	8
1971	Gold Leaf Team Lotus	Lotus 72	Ford V8	ARG; Ret		QUE; Ret	SPR; 7		RIN	OUL	VIC; 2
1971	Gold Leaf Team Lotus	Lotus 56B	P&W gas turbine		ROC; Ret			INT; Ret			
1972	John Player Team Lotus	Lotus 72D	Ford V8	**ROC**; 1	**BRA**; Ret	**INT**; 1	OUL; 2	**REP**; 1	**VIC**; Ret		
1973	John Player Team Lotus	Lotus 72	Ford V8	ROC; Ret	INT; Ret						
1974	Marlboro Team Texaco	McLaren M23B	Ford V8	PRE; 1	ROC; 3	INT					
1975	Marlboro Team McLaren	McLaren M23C	Ford V8	ROC; 5	INT; 2	SUI; Ret					
1978	Fittipaldi Automotive	Fittipaldi F5A	Ford V8	INT; 2							
1980	Skol Fittipaldi Team	Fittipaldi F7	Ford V8	ESP; 5							

=== USAC ===
(key) (Races in bold indicate pole position)

Year	Team	1	2	Rank	Points	Ref
1983-84	GTS Racing	DQSF	INDY; 32	**37th**	**5**	

=== CART ===
(key) (Races in bold indicate pole position)

Year	Team	No.	Chassis	Engine	1	2	3	4	5	6	7	8	9	10	11	12	13	14	15	16	17	Rank	Points	Ref
1984	WIT Racing	47	March 83C	Cosworth DFX V8 t	LBH; 5	PHX; 12																15th	30	
1984	WIT Racing	47	March 84C	Cosworth DFX V8 t			INDY; 32	MIL	POR													15th	30	
1984	H&R Racing	82	March 84C	Cosworth DFX V8 t						MEA; 7	CLE; 20	MCH	ROA	POC								15th	30	
1984	Patrick Racing	40	March 84C	Cosworth DFX V8 t											MOH; 4	SAN; 18	MCH; 12	PHX	LAG	CPL; 13		15th	30	
1985	Patrick Racing	40	March 85C	Cosworth DFX V8 t	LBH; 2	INDY; 13	MIL; 8	POR; 3	MEA; 2	CLE; 8	MCH; 1	ROA; 5	POC; 6	MOH; 8	SAN; 25	MCH; 13	LAG; 24	PHX; 8	MIA; 26			6th	104	
1986	Patrick Racing	20	March 86C	Cosworth DFX V8 t	PHX; 3	LBH; 16	INDY; 7	MIL; 24	**POR**; 12	MEA; 2	CLE; 13	**TOR**; 17	MCH; 20	POC; 19	MOH; 21	SAN; 3	MCH; 3	ROA; 1	LAG; 7	PHX; 5	MIA; 20	7th	103	
1987	Patrick Racing	20	March 87C	Chevrolet 265A V8 t	LBH; 19	PHX; 18	INDY; 16	MIL; 7	POR; 14	MEA; 3	CLE; 1	TOR; 1*	MCH; 7	POC; 18	ROA; 18	MOH; 6	NAZ; 21	LAG; 20	MIA; 10			10th	78	
1988	Patrick Racing	20	March 88C	Chevrolet 265A V8 t	PHX; 21	LBH; 16	INDY; 2	MIL; 3	POR; 3													7th	105	
1988	Patrick Racing	20	Lola T88/00	Chevrolet 265A V8 t						CLE; 19	TOR; 4		MCH; 19									7th	105	
1988	Patrick Racing	20	Lola T87/00	Chevrolet 265A V8 t								**MEA**; 14*		POC; 21	MOH; 1*	ROA; 1*	NAZ; 8	LAG; 16	MIA; 20			7th	105	
1989	Patrick Racing	20	Penske PC-17	Chevrolet 265A V8 t	PHX; 5	LBH; 3																1st	196	
1989	Patrick Racing	20	Penske PC-18	Chevrolet 265A V8 t			INDY; 1*	MIL; 16	DET; 1	POR; 1*	CLE; 1*	**MEA**; 2	**TOR**; 2	**MCH**; 14	**POC**; 19	MOH; 4	ROA; 5	NAZ; 1*	LAG; 5			1st	196	
1990	Team Penske	1	Penske PC-19	Chevrolet 265A V8 t	PHX; 5	LBH; 2	**INDY**; 3*	MIL; 3	DET; 7	POR; 9	CLE; 3	MEA; 6	TOR; 20	**MCH**; 17*	DEN; 18	VAN; 6	MOH; 12	ROA; 2	NAZ; 1*	LAG; 6		5th	144	
1991	Team Penske	5	Penske PC-20	Chevrolet 265A V8 t	SRF; 19	LBH; 17	PHX; 3	INDY; 11	MIL; 8	DET; 1*	**POR**; 2	**CLE**; 2*	MEA; 7	TOR; 21	MCH; 20	DEN; 2	VAN; 17	MOH; 2	ROA; 6	NAZ; 8	LAG; 4	5th	140	
1992	Team Penske	5	Penske PC-21	Chevrolet 265B V8 t	SRF; 1	PHX; 3	LBH; 3	INDY; 24	DET; 8	**POR**; 2	MIL; 4	NHA; 21	TOR; 19	MCH; 13	**CLE**; 1*	ROA; 1*	VAN; 19	MOH; 1	NAZ; 7	LAG; 19		4th	151	
1993	Team Penske	4	Penske PC-22	Chevrolet 265C V8 t	SRF; 2*	PHX; 14	LBH; 13	INDY; 1	MIL; 3	DET; 23	POR; 1*	CLE; 2	**TOR**; 2	MCH; 13	NHA; 3	ROA; 5	VAN; 7	MOH; 1*	NAZ; 5	**LAG**; 2		2nd	183	
1994	Team Penske	2	Penske PC-23	Ilmor 265D V8 t	SRF; 2	PHX; 1*	LBH; 21		MIL; 2	DET; 2	POR; 2	CLE; 20	TOR; 3	MCH; 10	MOH; 3	**NHA**; 3*	VAN; 9	ROA; 3	**NAZ**; 3	LAG; 4		2nd	178	
1994	Team Penske	2	Penske PC-23	Mercedes-Benz 500I V8 t				INDY; 17*														2nd	178	
1995	Team Penske	2	Penske PC-24	Mercedes-Benz IC108B V8 t	MIA; 24	SRF; 18	PHX; 3*	LBH; 20	NAZ; 1	INDY; DNQ	MIL; 23	DET; 10	POR; 21	ROA; 15	TOR; 10	CLE; 25	MCH; 5	MOH; 21	NHA; 5	VAN; 7	LAG; 16	11th	67	
1996	Hogan Penske	9	Penske PC-25	Mercedes-Benz IC108C V8 t	MIA; 13	RIO; 11	SRF; 25	LBH; 20	NAZ; 4	500; 10	MIL; 4	DET; 25	POR; 20	CLE; 22	TOR; 14	MCH; 25	MOH	ROA	VAN	LAG		19th	29	

=== Indianapolis 500 results ===
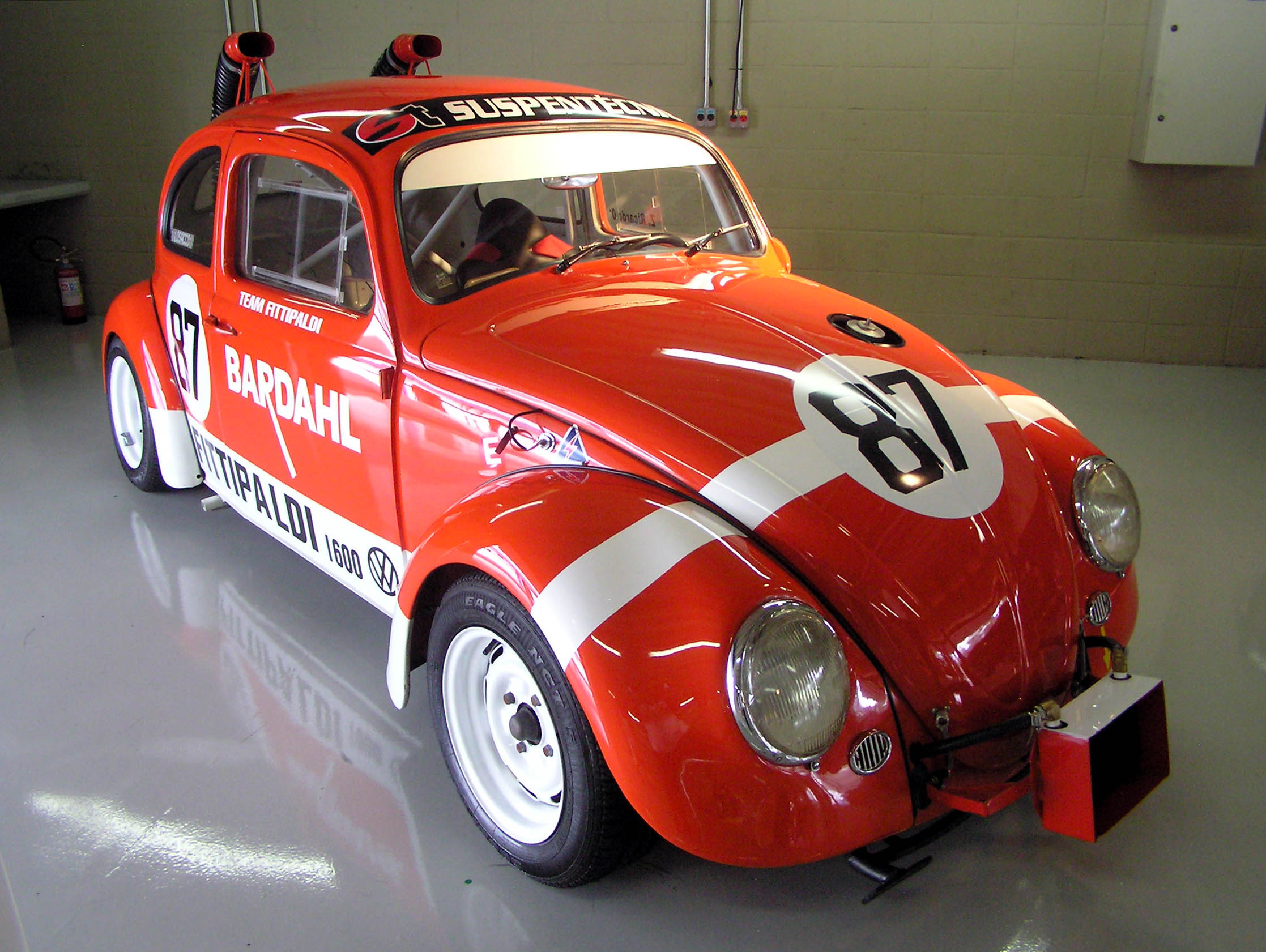
Twin-engine racing Beetle developed by Wilson and Emerson Fittipaldi

Year	Chassis	Engine	Start	Finish	Team
1984	March	Cosworth	23rd	32nd	WIT
1985	March	Cosworth	5th	13th	Patrick
1986	March	Cosworth	11th	7th	Patrick
1987	March	Chevrolet	33rd	16th	Patrick
1988	March	Chevrolet	8th	2nd	Patrick
1989	Penske	Chevrolet	3rd	**1st**	Patrick
1990	Penske	Chevrolet	**1st**	3rd	Penske
1991	Penske	Chevrolet	15th	11th	Penske
1992	Penske	Chevrolet	11th	24th	Penske
1993	Penske	Chevrolet	9th	**1st**	Penske
1994	Penske	Ilmor-Mercedes	3rd	17th	Penske
1995	Lola	Ilmor-Mercedes	Failed to Qualify		Penske

=== Complete 24 Hours of Daytona results ===
Year	Team	Co-Drivers	Car	Class	Laps	Pos.	Class Pos.	Ref
1985	(United States) Ralph Sanchez Racing	(United States) Tony Garcia (Colombia) Mauricio DeNarvaez	March 85G-Buick	GTP	-	DNS	DNS	

=== Complete Grand Prix Masters results ===
(key) Races in bold indicate pole position, races in italics indicate fastest lap.

Year	Team	Chassis	Engine	1	2	3	4	5
2005	Team LG	Delta Motorsport GPM	Nicholson McLaren 3.5 V8	RSA; 2				
2006	Team LG	Delta Motorsport GPM	Nicholson McLaren 3.5 V8	QAT; 12	ITA; C	GBR; 8	MAL; C	RSA; C

=== Complete FIA World Endurance Championship results ===
Year	Entrant	Class	Chassis	Engine	1	2	3	4	5	6	7	8	Rank	Points
2014	AF Corse	LMGTE Am	Ferrari 458 Italia GT2	Ferrari 4.5 L V8	SIL	SPA	LMS	COA	FUJ	SHA	BHR	SÃO; 6	23rd	8

== See also ==
- Ayrton Senna and Nelson Piquet Formula One world champions from Brazil
- Mario Andretti, Nigel Mansell, and Jacques Villeneuve – Formula One and CART champions
- Jim Clark, Graham Hill, Mario Andretti, and Jacques Villeneuve – Formula One world champions and Indianapolis 500 winners
- Jody Scheckter, Michael Schumacher, and Jackie Stewart – Formula One world champions whose brothers also drove in the series

Sporting positions
Preceded by Tim Schenken	British Formula 3 Championship; BRSCC Series Champion; 1969	Succeeded by Dave Walker; 1970 BRSCC Lombank Series
Preceded by Tim Schenken	British Formula 3 Championship; BRSCC Series Champion; 1969	Succeeded by Tony Trimmer; 1970 BRSCC Motorsport/Shell Series
Preceded by Graham Hill	BRDC International Trophy; Winner; 1972	Succeeded by Jackie Stewart
Preceded by Jackie Stewart	Formula One World Champion; 1972	Succeeded by Jackie Stewart
Preceded by Clay Regazzoni	Brands Hatch Race of Champions; Winner; 1972	Succeeded by Peter Gethin
Preceded by Jackie Stewart	Formula One World Champion; 1974	Succeeded by Niki Lauda
Preceded by Rick Mears	Indianapolis 500 Winner; 1989	Succeeded by Arie Luyendyk
Preceded by Danny Sullivan	CART Series; Champion; 1989	Succeeded by Al Unser Jr.
Preceded by Al Unser Jr.	Indianapolis 500 Winner; 1993	Succeeded by Al Unser Jr.
Records
Preceded by Jim Clark; 27 years, 188 days (1963 season)	Youngest Formula One; World Drivers' Champion; 25 years, 273 days (1972 season)	Succeeded by Fernando Alonso; 24 years, 58 days (2005 season)
