= Chevron B7 =

- Category: Formula 2, Formula 3, SCCA racing
- Production: 1967; 1 car built
- Successor: Chevron B9

Technical specifications
- Chassis: Tubular space frame
- Engine: Climax Straight-four engine
- Transmission: Hewland 5-speed manual

Competition history
- Notable drivers: (United Kingdom) Peter Gethin (United Kingdom) Derek Bennett

The Chevron B7 was the first open-wheel formula racing car, built by Chevron Cars in 1967.

In 1967, Chevron developed its first Formula Two racing car. The B7 should enable the company to break through in the newly created Formula 2 European Championship. The vehicle had a conservative space frame and was powered by a 4-cylinder Climax engine.

However, the car was only ready in the late summer of 1967, when the European Championship was already in full swing. Without much testing time behind him, the car was driven by works driver Peter Gethin. In two races, company founder and owner Derek Bennett even got behind the wheel of the small racing car.

Although the car was unsuccessful, it was an essential milestone in Chevron's history. It marked the entry into international motorsport and was the basis for the B9, the British racing team's first successful racing car.
