= Tim Schenken =

Australian racing driver (born 1943)

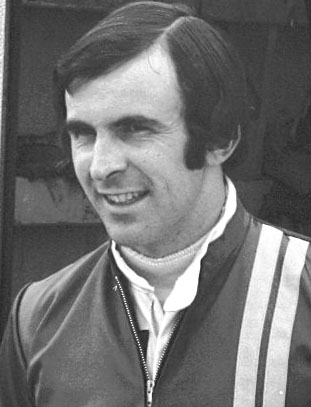
- Schenken at the 1971 German Grand Prix
- Born: Timothy Theodore Schenken; 26 September 1943 (age 83); Gordon, New South Wales, Australia

Formula One World Championship career
- Nationality: (Australia) Australian
- Active years: 1970–1974
- Team(s): Williams, Brabham, Surtees, Trojan, Lotus
- Entries: 36 (34 starts)
- Championships: 0
- Wins: 0
- Podiums: 1
- Career points: 7
- Pole positions: 0
- Fastest laps: 0
- First entry: 1970 Austrian Grand Prix
- Last entry: 1974 United States Grand Prix

Timothy Theodore Schenken OAM (born 26 September 1943) is a former racing driver from Sydney, New South Wales, Australia. He participated in 36 Formula One World Championship Grands Prix, debuting on 16 August 1970. He achieved one career podium at the 1971 Austrian Grand Prix, and scored a total of seven championship points. He did however have two non-championship race podiums – he finished third in the 1971 BRDC International Trophy and third in the 1972 International Gold Cup.

== Career ==
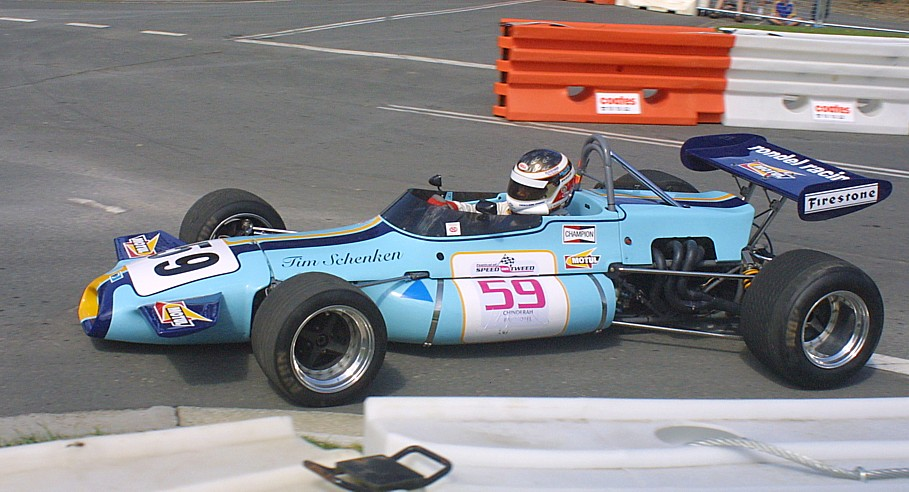
A Rondel Racing Brabham BT36, as driven by Schenken in the 1971 European Formula Two season.

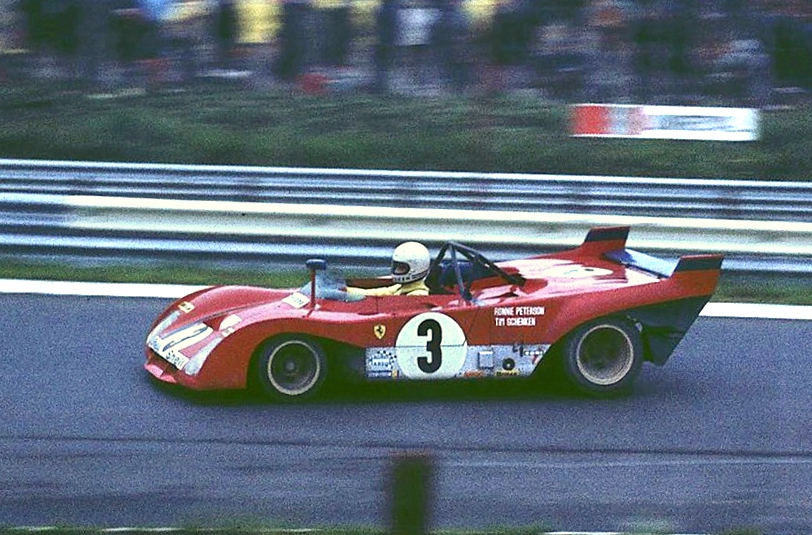
Schenken at the Nürburgring in 1972

Schenken's lower formula results included winning the 1968 British Lombank Formula Three Championship, 1968 Grovewood Award, 1968 British Formula Ford Championship, 1968 ER Hall Formula Three Trophy, 1969 French Craven A Formula Three Championship, 1969 Greater London Formula Three Trophy, finishing fourth in the 1971 European Formula Two Championship and finishing third in the 1972 Brazilian Formula Two International Tournament.

Schenken had a great deal of success in sports cars racing for Ferrari. In 1972, he won the Buenos Aires 1000 km and Nürburgring 1000 km races, finished second in the Daytona 6hour, Sebring 12hour, Brands Hatch 1000 km and the Watkins Glen 6hour, and finished third at the Monza 1000 km and Zeltweg 1000 km races. 1973 saw him finish second at the Vallelunga 6hour and Monza 1000 km races. In 1975 and 1976, he finished second in the Nürburgring 1000 km, and then in 1977, he won the Nürburgring 1000 km race for a second time. At Le Mans in 1976, he finished second in the GT Class and was 16th overall. In 1975, he was runner up in the European GT Championship and finished third in the championship in 1976.

In 1974, Schenken co-founded Tiga Race Cars in Britain with New Zealander Howden Ganley, whose cars had great success in the Sports 2000 category, and constructed cars for a number of over formulae. He is currently employed each year as the Race Director for the Australian V8 Supercar Championship Series. He also is a director of Motorsport Australia, the Clerk of the Course at the Australian Grand Prix and was the Clerk of the Course for the inaugural 2008 Singapore Grand Prix.

As of the 2025 season, Schenken is one of only six Australians who have stood on the podium for a Formula One Grand Prix. The others are Grand Prix winners Oscar Piastri, Mark Webber and Daniel Ricciardo, as well as World Champions Sir Jack Brabham and Alan Jones.

On 16 June 2016, Schenken was awarded the Medal of the Order of Australia in the General Division as part of the Queen's Birthday honours. He is currently the Director of Race Operations for Motorsport Australia.

Schenken is married and has a son, Guido, and identical twin daughters, Laura and Natalie.

== Career summary ==
Season	Series	Position	Car	Team
1968	British Lombank Formula 3 Series	1st	Brabham BT21B Ford; Brabham BT28 Ford; Chevron B9 Ford	Sports Motors
1968	British Formula Ford Championship	1st	Merlyn Mk.11 Ford	
1969	British Lombank Formula 3 Series	6th	Brabham BT28 Ford	Sports Motors
1969	French Craven A Formula 3 Series	1st	Brabham BT28 Ford	Sports Motors
1970	European Formula Two Championship	12th	Brabham BT30 Ford	Sports Motors
1971	World Drivers' Championship	14th	Brabham BT33 Ford	Motor Racing Developments
1971	European Formula Two Championship	4th	Brabham BT36 Ford	Rondel Racing
1972	World Drivers' Championship	19th	Surtees TS9B Ford; Surtees TS14 Ford	Brooke Bond Oxo - Rob Walker Team Surtees Flame Out Team Surtees Team Surtees
1972	British Formula Two Championship	11th	Brabham BT38 Ford	Rondel Racing
1975	Interserie	3rd	Porsche 917/10 Turbo; Mirage GR8 Ford	Gelo Racing Team
1975	European GT Championship	2nd	Porsche 911 Carrera RSR	Gelo Racing Team
1976	European GT Championship	3rd	Porsche 934	Gelo Racing Team
1976	Deutsche Rennsport Meisterschaft	5th	Porsche 934	Gelo Racing Team
1977	Deutsche Rennsport Meisterschaft	9th	Porsche 935	Gelo Racing Team

== Complete Formula One World Championship results ==
(key)

Year	Entrant	Chassis	Engine	1	2	3	4	5	6	7	8	9	10	11	12	13	14	15	WDC	Points
1970	Frank Williams Racing Cars	De Tomaso 505	Cosworth V8	RSA	ESP	MON	BEL	NED	FRA	GBR	GER	AUT; Ret	ITA; Ret	CAN; NC	USA; Ret	MEX			NC	0
1971	Motor Racing Developments	Brabham BT33	Cosworth V8	RSA	ESP; 9	MON; 10	NED; Ret	FRA; 12	GBR; 12	GER; 6	AUT; 3	ITA; Ret	CAN; Ret	USA; Ret					14th	5
1972	Brooke Bond Oxo - Rob Walker Team Surtees	Surtees TS9B	Cosworth V8	ARG; 5	RSA; Ret									CAN; 7					19th	2
1972	Flame Out Team Surtees	Surtees TS9B	Cosworth V8						FRA; 17	GBR; Ret									19th	2
1972	Team Surtees	Surtees TS9B	Cosworth V8			ESP; 8	MON; Ret	BEL; Ret			GER; 14	AUT; 11	ITA; Ret						19th	2
1972	Team Surtees	Surtees TS14	Cosworth V8												USA; Ret				19th	2
1973	Frank Williams Racing Cars	Iso-Marlboro IR	Cosworth V8	ARG	BRA	RSA	ESP	BEL	MON	SWE	FRA	GBR	NED	GER	AUT	ITA	CAN; 14	USA	NC	0
1974	Trojan-Tauranac Racing	Trojan T103	Cosworth V8	ARG	BRA	RSA	ESP; 14	BEL; 10	MON; Ret	SWE	NED; DNQ	FRA	GBR; Ret	GER; DNQ	AUT; 10	ITA; Ret	CAN		NC	0
1974	John Player Team Lotus	Lotus 76	Cosworth V8															USA; DSQ	NC	0

=== Complete 24 Hours of Le Mans results ===
Year	Team	Co-drivers	Car	Class	Laps	Pos.	Class pos.
1973	(Italy) SpA Ferrari SEFAC	(Argentina) Carlos Reutemann	Ferrari 312PB	S 3.0	182	DNF	DNF
1975	(Germany) Gelo Racing Team	(New Zealand) Howden Ganley	Porsche 911 Carrera RSR	GT	106	DNF	DNF
1976	(Germany) Gelo Racing Team	(Netherlands) Toine Hezemans	Porsche 934	GT	277	16th	2nd
1977	(Germany) Gelo Racing Team	(Netherlands) Toine Hezemans (Germany) Hans Heyer	Porsche 935	Gr.5	15	DNF	DNF
1977	(Germany) Gelo Racing Team	(Netherlands) Toine Hezemans (Germany) Hans Heyer	Porsche 935	Gr.5	269	DNF	DNF

Sporting positions
Preceded by Harry Stiller; Les Leston Series	British Formula 3 Championship; Lombank Series Champion; 1968	Succeeded by Emerson Fittipaldi
