= Alvean =

Sugar trading firm

- Company type: Private
- Founded: 2014; 12 years ago
- Key people: Mauro Angelo (CEO)
- Website: alvean.com

Alvean is a sugar trading firm, the largest sugar trading firm in the world (2023).

== History ==
Alvean was created as a joint venture between the Brazilian Copersucar and the American Cargill in 2014.

In 2021 Reuters reported that the firm was responsible for 20% of the sugar trade. Cargill sold its stake in Alvean to Copersucar in 2021.

== Governance ==
=== CEOs ===
- 2017-2019: Gareth Griffiths
- 2019-2023: Paulo Roberto de Souza
- Since 2023: Mauro Angelo
