= Copersucar =

Brazilian agricultural company

Copersucar S.A.
- Type: Private
- Industry: Trading
- Founded: 1959
- Headquarters: São Paulo, Brazil
- Key people: Luís Roberto Pogetti, (CEO) Giancarlo Moreira, (Chairman)
- Products: Ethanol, Sugar
- Revenue: ▲US$10.4 billion (2013/14)
- Net income: ▲US$70.5 million (2013/14)
- Number of employees: 11,300
- Website: www.copersucar.com

Copersucar is the world's largest sugar and ethanol company and one of the most important exporters worldwide, with a capacity of more than 10 billion liters of ethanol, it is the largest sugar and ethanol trader in the world. In its 50 years of activities, the company reached the number of 48 operating mills in the states of São Paulo, Goiás, Paraná and Minas Gerais. The projected figure for the 2009/2010, crop is 79 million tons of sugarcane, a 16% volume increase over the last crop and a strong demonstration of Copersucar’s dynamic growth drive. The company accounted for 13% of all sugar and 13% of all the ethanol commercialized in the South Central region in the last crop. Within ten years, Copersucar S.A. plans to have a 30% share of the domestic market and be one of the major world players with 12% of the global ethanol market. The company's main competitors are Cosan, Tereos Internacional, Czarnikow, Biosev, Odebrecht Agroindustrial, among others. In addition the company owns the American ethanol company Eco-Energy.

The company was created by the sugar and ethanol producers who are members of the Cooperativa de Produtores de Cana-de-Açúcar, Açúcar e Álcool do Estado de São Paulo and who are now the shareholders of Produpar, the holding company controlling Copersucar.

The new business model permits the producer-shareholders to maintain their independence, autonomy, and the specific efficiencies of their production units, while enabling them to participate effectively in all other stages of the business chain, in which scale and knowledge of global markets are fundamental for generating and capturing value.

Copersucar combines production efficiency in the mills, managed by the producers, with gains in scale in logistics, commercialization and risk management.

In 2005, Copersucar sold all of its retail brands, including Açúcar União, to Grupo NovAmérica.

A fire on 18 October 2013 burned 300,000 tons of stored sugar, causing the global sugar price to rise.

In 2014, Copersucar and American firm Cargill formed Alvean, a sugar trading firm.

In 2017, it produced 3.8 million tons of sugar and 4.8 billion liters of ethanol.
