= Tetsu Ikuzawa =

Japanese racing driver

- Born: 21 August 1942 (age 84); Tokyo, Japan
- Children: Mai Ikuzawa

Previous series
- 1971-1978 1978 1974, 1976-1977 1970-1973 1966-1969: Fuji Grand Champion Series; All-Japan Formula Two Championship; All-Japan Formula 2000 Championship; European Formula Two Championship; British Formula Three Championship

Championship titles
- 1977: Fuji Grand Champion Series

Awards
- 1967 1964: Japanese Grand Prix; Japanese Grand Prix (Touring car, T-V class)

24 Hours of Le Mans career
- Years: 1973, 1980-1981
- Teams: Sigma Automotive; Gozzy Kremer Racing; Mazdaspeed

Tetsu Ikuzawa (生沢徹, Ikuzawa Tetsu; born 21 August 1942) is a Japanese former racing driver, team executive, and businessman from Tokyo, Japan. He is one of the most successful and prolific Japanese drivers from the early years of the nation's automobile racing history. Ikuzawa was the first Japanese driver to regularly compete in a number of notable European championships, namely the British Formula Three Championship and European Formula Two Championship. He was also one of the first Japanese drivers to compete in the 24 Hours of Le Mans endurance race, making his first start in 1973 for Sigma Automotive alongside his countryman, Hiroshi Fushida. In domestic competition, Ikuzawa won the 1964 and 1967 Japanese Grand Prix sports car races, and the 1977 Fuji Grand Champion Series.

== Racing career ==
=== Early career in Japan ===
==== 1957-1962 ====
Ikuzawa's father, Rou, was a painter and illustrator. When he was just 15 years old, he entered the 1st All-Japan Motorcycle Clubman Race at the Asama Kogen Automobile Test Course, riding a 50cc Otsuki Dandy in the 125cc race. He was the last out of twelve riders classified, yet he earned a special "Fighting Spirit Award" from the organisers of the event just for being able to run until the end of the race without quitting. The following year, Ikuzawa took part in the 2nd All-Japan Motorcycle Clubman Race at Asama, finishing second in the 50cc race. He was one of the first riders that went to the new Suzuka International Racing Course, taking part in the inaugural Japan National Road Racing Championships. Ikuzawa finished fifth in the 125cc race on a Tohatsu.

==== 1963-1966 ====
Ikuzawa switched from motorcycles to cars, beginning with the inaugural Japanese Grand Prix sports and touring car race meeting at Suzuka in May 1963. He signed a works driver contract with the Prince Motor Company, and entered the Grand Prix in the new Skyline Sport Coupe.

The second Japanese Grand Prix was held at Suzuka in 1964. This time, Ikuzawa took part in three races for Prince. One of those races was the GT-II sports car race, held on 3 May. Ikuzawa was in a special model of the Prince Skyline, the GTS54, which had a longer nose and the straight-six engine from the Gloria. Sokichi Shikiba led the first six laps of the race in his mid-engined Porsche 904. But on the seventh lap, Ikuzawa overtook Shikiba before the Hairpin curve. Ikuzawa would lead one lap, before eventually finishing third behind Shikiba and Prince teammate Yoshikazu Sunako. This race is commonly referred to as the "beginning of the Skyline racing legend". Later that afternoon, Ikuzawa won the T-V touring car race in a more conventional Skyline 1500, coming back from as low as 20th place on the opening lap to win the race.

In 1965, Ikuzawa raced in the All-Japan Car Club Championship at Funabashi Circuit, driving his personal Honda S600. He finished second in the GT-I sports car race to the Toyota Sports 800 of close friend Tojiro Ukiya. This was Ukiya's last victory before he was killed in a private testing accident at Suzuka just one month later.

The Japanese Grand Prix moved to the new Fuji Speedway in 1966, and the event was reformatted from a series of short sprint races into a single long-distance main event. Ikuzawa drove one of Prince's four new mid-engined R380 sports prototypes. He retired from the race due to a gearbox failure, while Sunako went on to win the 60 lap main event. After the Grand Prix, Ikuzawa resigned from Prince as a works driver to pursue a career racing overseas as an independent driver.

==== 1967-1970 ====
Though his focus was now primarily on his new overseas challenge, Ikuzawa still returned to Japan every year to take part in the Japanese Grand Prix. Denied an opportunity to race in the 1967 Japanese GP for Nissan (who had finalized their acquisition of Prince in 1966), Ikuzawa leased a Porsche 906 from Japanese importer Mitsuwa Motors. His privateer effort was funded through some of the first corporate sponsorship deals in Japanese domestic motorsport: Pepsi-Cola, VAN Jacket, STP, and Bridgestone were among the major sponsors that signed on, along with driving apparel company Racing Mate, which was established by Shikiba (now retired from racing) and former driver Tokudaiji Aritsune.

During qualifying, Ikuzawa became the first driver ever to lap the six kilometre Fuji Speedway under two minutes and secured pole position. In the race, Ikuzawa recovered from an early incident with the Nissan of Kunimitsu Takahashi, then overtook the rival Porsche 906 of Tadashi Sakai to capture the lead again. After Sakai crashed out of the race, Ikuzawa went on to win the race and a total of ¥1,750,000 in prize money.

Ikuzawa returned to defend his Japanese Grand Prix victory in 1968. This time, he partnered with former driver Shintaro Taki's new team, Taki Racing Organisation, running the newer Porsche 910. With the more powerful Group 7 two-seaters such as the Nissan R381 and Toyota 7/415S making their first appearance in the race, Ikuzawa's two-litre Porsche outlasted many of the more powerful "monster machines", and finished second overall behind race winner Moto Kitano.

In 1969, Ikuzawa entered the inaugural JAF Grand Prix formula car race at Fuji. He won the pole in his Mitsubishi Colt F2C, but retired from the race due to an engine failure. Ikuzawa returned for the 1970 JAF Grand Prix at Fuji in the upgraded Colt F2D, but once again, he retired from the race due to a mechanical issue.

Ikuzawa's appearance in the 1970 JAF Grand Prix was more notable for what happened during the opening ceremonies. With dignitaries including Prince Takamatsu in attendance, Ikuzawa was selected to recite the pre-race oath on behalf of the drivers. Instead, he refused to take the oath, and voiced his discontent with the Japan Automobile Federation (JAF) and their treatment of Japanese drivers over participation fees and travel expenses. He was initially banned from racing in Japan for one year by the JAF as a consequence. The ban was reduced following an apology from Ikuzawa.

=== International career ===
==== Formula 3 (1966-1969) ====
Ikuzawa signed a contract with Stirling Moss' Motor Racing Stables team to compete in the British Formula Three Championship in 1966. In his first partial season in Great Britain, Ikuzawa ran seven races in a Lotus 41, with a best finish of fourth in a BARC non-championship race at Brands Hatch on 21 August.

Motor Racing Stables changed from Lotus to Brabham BT21s for the 1967 season. Ikuzawa ran 17 races that season. He won three non-championship events at Brands Hatch: A BRSCC Formula Libre race on 9 July, the Sevenoaks & DMC F3 race on 6 August, and a BRSCC F3 club race on 20 August. He finished ninth in the British Formula 3 Championship with 26 points.

For the 1968 season, Ikuzawa transferred to Frank Williams Racing Cars, where he drove the Brabham BT21B. The 1968 season was his best season to date: He finished fourth in the British F3 Championship with 51 points, winning four championship races. His first win came in round 11 at Brands Hatch, followed by wins in rounds 13 and 19 at Mallory Park, and round 21 at Oulton Park. He also won the non-championship Martini International Formula 3 Trophy race at Silverstone Circuit. He also ventured outside Britain for the first time in his F3 career, racing at Zandvoort, Montlhéry, Reims, Rouen, Hämeenlinna, and Karlskoga.

Ikuzawa negotiated with Surtees Racing Organisation to secure a step up to Formula 2 and Formula 5000 for the 1969 season. Negotiations between Surtees and Ikuzawa broke down, and Ikuzawa joined Michael Spence Limited for a reduced schedule of F3 races. He won the non-championship Guards 4,000 Guineas at Mallory Park.

==== Sports cars (1967-1973) ====
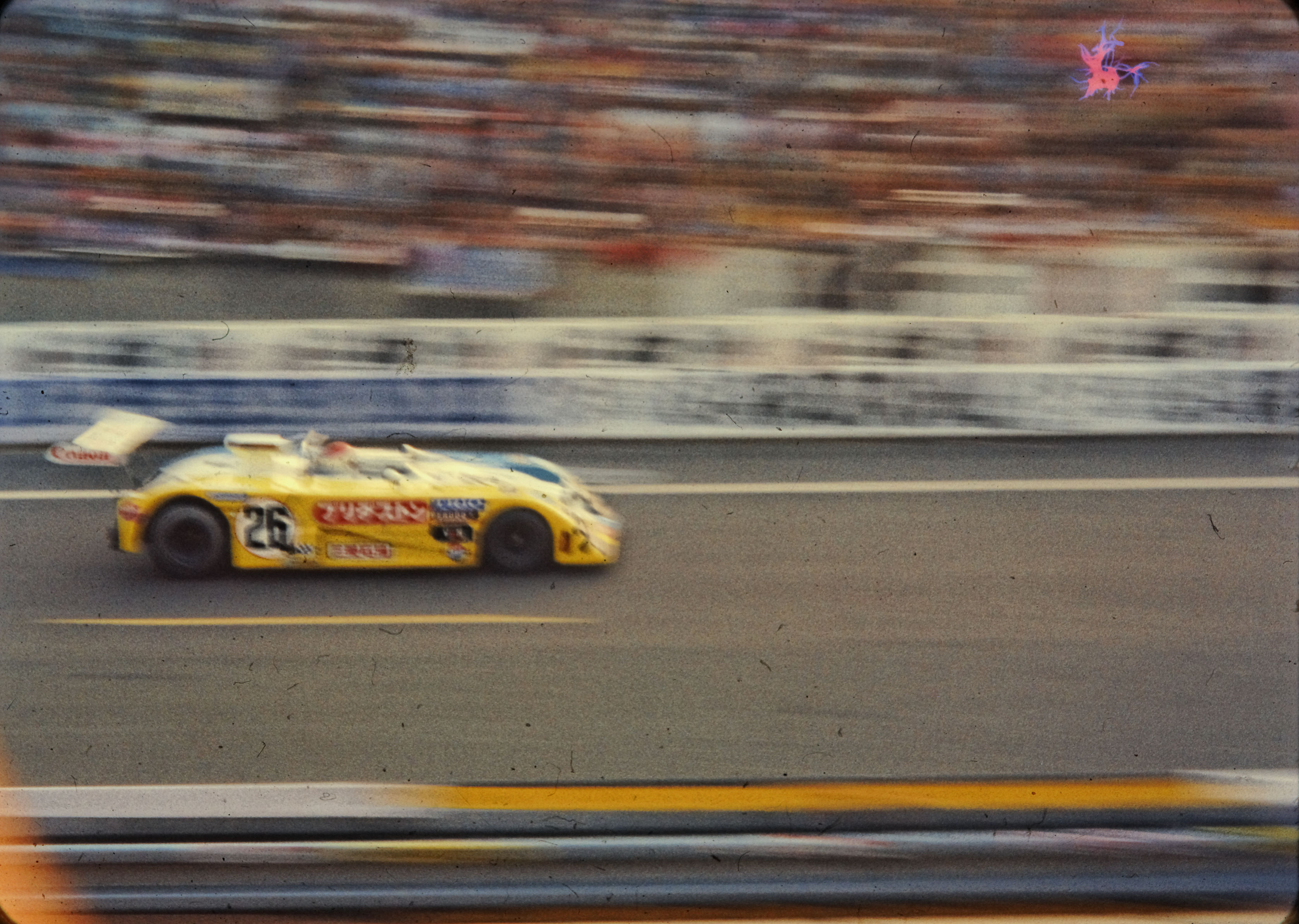
Ikuzawa driving his Sigma MC73-Mazda during the 1973 24 Hours of Le Mans.

Ikuzawa's success in Britain, as well as his Japanese Grand Prix victory in the Porsche 906, captured the attention of Porsche AG motorsport director Fritz Huschke von Hanstein. Ikuzawa was nominated as a reserve driver for the Porsche System Engineering works team in the BOAC 500 Miles at Brands Hatch. In the last round of the 1967 World Sportscar Championship, the Nürburgring 500km, Ikuzawa finished 11th overall in his Honda S800 as the GT class winner.

Von Hanstein selected Ikuzawa as a Porsche works driver once again for the 1968 Watkins Glen 6 Hours, driving the number 2 Porsche 908 alongside Hans Herrmann and Jo Siffert. This made Ikuzawa the first Japanese to represent Porsche as a factory racing driver. The trio finished sixth overall, in what would be Ikuzawa's only race with the Porsche factory team.

In 1973, Ikuzawa made his first appearance in the 24 Hours of Le Mans as part of a landmark entry. Sigma Automotive (forerunner to the current company SARD Co. Ltd) were the first Japanese team to enter the 24 Hours of Le Mans, with their Sigma MC73 prototype powered by a Mazda 2-rotor Wankel engine (the first rotary-powered car to enter Le Mans). Ikuzawa and Hiroshi Fushida would be the first Japanese drivers to compete at Le Mans, with a driver lineup rounded out by French driver Patrick Dal Bo. The Sigma MC73-Mazda qualified 14th to make the field of 55 cars. Ikuzawa started the race, giving him the honours of being the very first Japanese driver to do a race stint at Le Mans, followed by Fushida and Dal Bo. Ten hours and thirty minutes into the race, the rotary-powered Sigma retired from the race due to a broken clutch, completing 79 laps.

==== Formula 2 (1970-1973) ====
For 1970, Ikuzawa secured his step up to the European Formula Two Championship as a privateer, entering a Lotus 69-Ford under the Tetsu Ikuzawa Racing Partnership banner. In just his second European F2 race, Ikuzawa nearly won the Deutschland Trophy race at the Hockenheimring. In the first 20 lap heat, Ikuzawa beat Clay Regazzoni by a tenth of a second. In the second heat, Regazzoni would beat Ikuzawa by four tenths of a second. The aggregate results gave Regazzoni the victory by a final margin of three tenths of a second. Ikuzawa scored points at Tulln and at Imola, finishing behind drivers who were not eligible for points. He finished the season tied for sixth in the championship with nine points.

Ikuzawa's Formula 2 success in Europe would be short-lived. He scored no points in 1971 with the same Lotus 69 from last season, finishing seventh at Tulln and at Mantorp Park.

In 1972, Ikuzawa signed with upstart constructor Group Racing Developments (GRD), in a partnership that would see him driving GRD vehicles in Europe, and back home at Japan in the upstart Fuji Grand Champion Series. Ikuzawa's first F2 campaign with GRD was filled with growing pains: He either failed to qualify or was eliminated during the heat stage three times, and finished no better than ninth (twice, at Hockenheim and Mantorp Park). Ikuzawa returned for the 1973 season, this time in a two-car effort with young Hiroshi Kazato, known as "Team Nippon." Some time after finishing a season-best eighth place at Mantorp Park, Ikuzawa decided to stop racing in Europe.

=== Later career in Japan ===
Ikuzawa remained a fixture in the Japanese racing circuit throughout the 1970s. He returned to domestic competition at the 1971 Japanese Grand Prix (Formula Libre), and finished third. That same year, he drove a Porsche 917K owned by David Piper in the final round of the new Fuji Grand Championship Series.

He primarily competed in the Fuji GC, at the wheel of his GRD S74 he finished fourth or better in the standings every year between 1974 and 1977. He finished second in the championship to Noritake Takahara in 1976. In 1977, Ikuzawa put together a consistent season to win the Grand Champion Series title by a single point over Kazuyoshi Hoshino. This would be Ikuzawa's only title in a major, annual Japanese racing championship. He also competed in the 1977 All-Japan Formula 2000 Championship, finishing 13th in the championship.

At the end of 1978, Ikuzawa retired from full-time competition.

=== After retirement ===
After his retirement, Ikuzawa launched a new team: i&i Racing Development, later known as Team Ikuzawa. They fielded cars in the All-Japan Formula Two Championship, winning championships with drivers Satoru Nakajima in 1981-1982 and Geoff Lees in 1983. Team Ikuzawa competed in the All-Japan Endurance Championship from 1984 to 1986, fielding the Toyota-powered TOM's 84C/85C/86C developed by Dome. In 1990, Ikuzawa became the manager of Nissan Motorsports Europe.

Team Ikuzawa was also involved in motorcycle road racing, winning the 1989 Suzuka 8 Hours with riders Dominique Sarron and Alex Vieira on their Honda RVF750.

While no longer racing full-time, Ikuzawa continued to run the 24 Hours of Le Mans. He entered the 1979 race in a Mazda RX-7 alongside Yojiro Terada and Claude Buchet, but their car failed to qualify by less than seven tenths of a second. He came back for 1980, this time in a Kremer Racing prepared Porsche 935 K3. The pink and white Kremer Porsche retired after 14 hours due to a head gasket failure. His final start at Le Mans came in 1981, back in an RX-7 prepared by Mazdaspeed in conjunction with Tom Walkinshaw Racing. They retired after 12 hours due to an engine failure.

In 2000, Ikuzawa, at age 57, came back to race in the Nürburgring 24 Hours race, driving a Spoon Sports prepared Honda S2000 with Tatsuru Ichishima, Hideki Okada, and Kazuo Shimizu. They finished 32nd overall and won the A7 class, completing 123 laps.

=== Proposed Ikuzawa F1 team (1994) ===
Despite his trailblazing status, and having some success in Europe, Ikuzawa was never able to break into Formula One as a driver. By early 1994, Ikuzawa was now trying to enter Formula One as a team owner. He recruited former Williams manager Peter Windsor and former Lotus designer Enrique Scalabroni to help establish a new prospective Formula One team. The Ikuzawa F1 team was preparing to enter the sport by no later than 1998, and evaluated the likes of Kenny Bräck and Gil de Ferran as potential driving candidates. However, Ikuzawa's prospective F1 entry never materialized as the result of financial difficulties, brought on by a slumping Japanese economy in the wake of the Great Hanshin Earthquake. Many of the staff recruited by Ikuzawa would go on to join Stewart Grand Prix, who made their F1 debut in 1997.

== Racing results ==
=== Complete European Formula Two Championship results ===
(key) (Races in bold indicate pole position; races in italics indicate fastest lap)

Year	Entrant	Chassis	Engine	1	2	3	4	5	6	7	8	9	10	11	12	13	14	15	16	17	Pos.	Pts
1970	Tetsu Ikuzawa Racing Partnership	Lotus 69	Ford	THR; 12	HOC; 2	BAR; Ret	ROU; Ret	PER	TUL; 7	IMO; 7	HOC; Ret										6th	9
1971	Tetsu Ikuzawa Racing Partnership	Lotus 69	Ford	HOC; Ret	THR; 13	NÜR	JAR	PAL; DNQ	ROU; Ret	MAN; 7	TUL; 7	ALB; Ret	VAL	VAL							NC	0
1972	GRS International	GRD 272	Ford	MAL; DNQ	THR	HOC; 9	PAU; DNS	PAL	HOC; Ret	ROU; DNQ	ÖST	IMO; DNQ	MAN; 9	PER	SAL	ALB; Ret	HOC; 14				NC	0
1973	GRS International/Team Nippon	GRD 273	Ford	MAL	HOC; Ret	THR; NC	NÜR; 13	PAU; 11	KIN	NIV	HOC; 13	ROU; 9	MNZ	MAN; 8	KAR	PER	SAL	NOR	ALB	VAL	NC	0

=== 24 Hours of Le Mans results ===
Year	Team	Co-Drivers	Car	Class	Laps	Pos.	Class Pos.
1973	(Japan) Sigma Automotive	(Japan) Hiroshi Fushida (France) Patrick Dal Bo	Sigma MC73-Mazda	S 2.5	79	DNF	DNF
1980	(Germany) Gozzy Kremer Racing	(Germany) Rolf Stommelen (Germany) Axel Plankenhorn	Porsche 935 K3	Gr.5	167	DNF	DNF
1981	(Japan) Mazdaspeed	(Japan) Tom Walkinshaw (United Kingdom) Peter Lovett	Mazda RX-7	IMSA; GTO	107	DNF	DNF

=== Japanese Grand Prix results (1963-1968) ===
Year	Circuit	Car	Race	Finish
1963	Suzuka	Prince Skyline Sport Coupe	B-II	Retired
1963	Suzuka	Prince Skyline Sport Coupe	C-VI	Retired
1964	Suzuka	Prince Gloria S41	T-VI	Retired
1964	Suzuka	Prince Skyline GTS54	GT-II	3rd place
1964	Suzuka	Prince Skyline 1500	T-V	**Winner**
1966	Fuji	Prince R380	GP	Retired (GP-II Class)
1967	Fuji	Porsche 906	GP	**Overall: Winner**; **GP-II Class: Winner**
1968	Fuji	Porsche 910	GP	Overall: 2nd place GP-II Class: Winner
