= Brabham BT21 =

Brabham BT21 Brabham BT21B Brabham BT21C
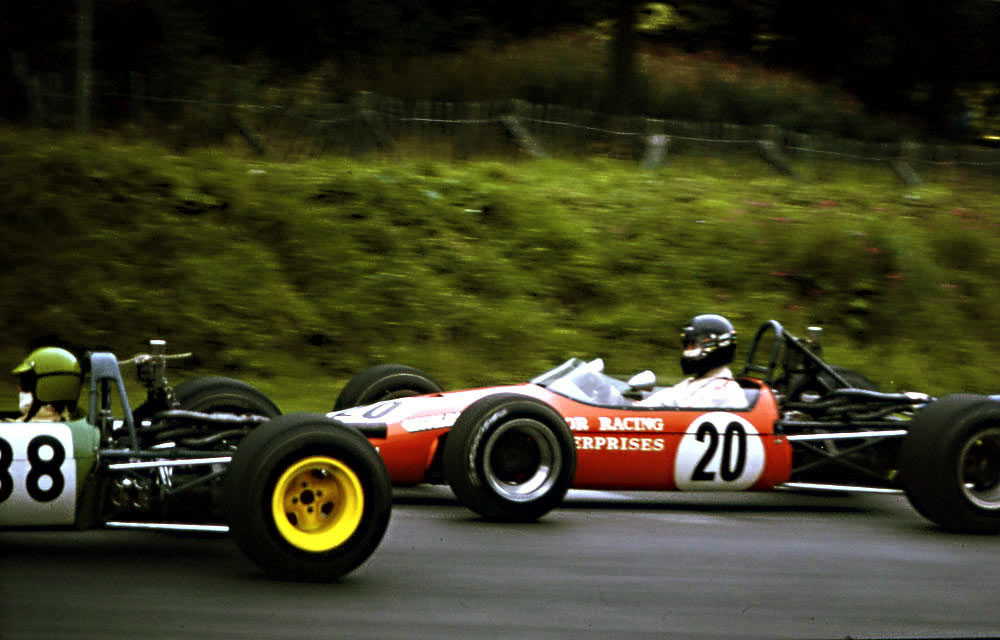
- James Hunt in a Brabham BT21 at Brands Hatch in 1969
- Category: Formula 3 Formula Libre; Formula B
- Production: 1966; 110 cars built
- Predecessor: Brabham BT18
- Successor: Brabham BT28

Technical specifications
- Chassis: Tubular space frame
- Engine: Cosworth MAE Straight-four engine
- Transmission: Hewland Mk. 4 5-speed manual
- Weight: 410 kg (900 lb)

Competition history
- Notable drivers: (United Kingdom) James Hunt

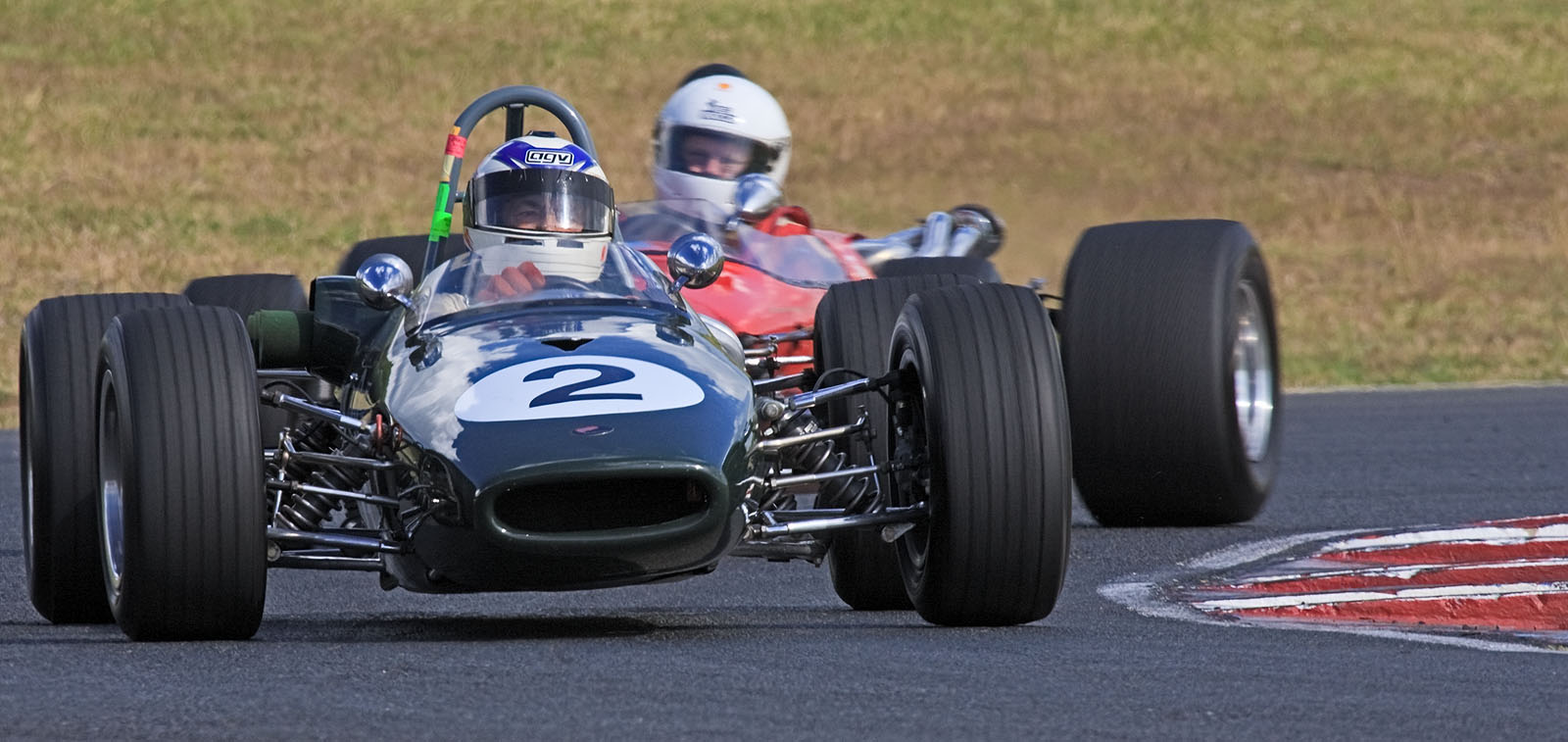
Brabham BT21

The Brabham BT21 was an open-wheel formula racing car, designed, developed, and built by Brabham in large numbers in 1966 and delivered to private individuals; 110 vehicles were manufactured.

Most were manufactured as Formula 3 cars, with some built for US Formula B and given the designation 21B. The wagons for the Formule Libre ran under the identifier 21C.

The first BT21s came to international racetracks in 1966. The chassis was flatter than the BT18, the suspension was revised and the body was completely rebuilt. In 1966 and 1967, a 997 cc (60.8 cu in) naturally aspirated Cosworth MAE four-cylinder engine with 125 hp (93 kW) and in 1968 a Holbay unit were used as engines. This drove the rear wheels through a Hewland Mk.4 five-speed manual transmission. The chassis was constructed out of a tubular space frame, with a lightweight fibreglass body. This meant the car was very light and nimble, weighing in at only 900 lb (410 kg).

Private drivers like Peter Westbury with his Felday Engineering Ltd. had much success with the BT21 in 1967. In 1968 the BT21 became a serious opponent with the new Tecno and the victories in Formula 3 became fewer.

The BT21B, therefore, underwent some changes. The car got wider wheels and a sturdier tubular space frame derived from the BT23, a Formula 2 car. This eliminated the shortcomings. In 1969 the BT21 was slowly being replaced by the BT28.
