= 1965 Trophées de France season =

Motor racing tournament

1965 Trophées de France

Seasons
- ← 1964 1966 →

The 1965 Trophées de France season was the second season of the Trophées de France Formula 2 championship. The season was dominated by Jim Clark, winning three out of the four events, driving a Lotus 35-Cosworth for Ron Harris Team Lotus. Jochen Rindt in a Roy Winkelmann Brabham BT16-Cosworth was the only other race winner, narrowly beating Frank Gardner's Lola T60 to the flag in the Reims Grand Prix in a race where only six-tenths of a second covered the top four finishers.

== Trophées de France ==
Champion: (United Kingdom) Jim Clark

Runner Up: (Austria) Jochen Rindt

=== Results ===
Round	Date	Event	Circuit	Winning driver	Winning team	Winning car
1	25 April	XXV Grand Prix Automobile de Pau	Pau	(United Kingdom) Jim Clark	Ron Harris - Team Lotus	Lotus 35-Cosworth
2	4 July	XXXI Grand Prix de Reims	Reims-Gueux	(Austria) Jochen Rindt	Roy Winkelmann Racing	Brabham BT16-Cosworth
3	11 July	XIII Grand Prix de Rouen	Rouen-Les-Essarts	(United Kingdom) Jim Clark	Ron Harris - Team Lotus	Lotus 35-Cosworth
4	26 September	XXIV Grand Prix d'Albi	Circuit d'Albi	(United Kingdom) Jim Clark	Ron Harris - Team Lotus	Lotus 35-Cosworth

=== Table ===
Place	Driver	Entrant	Car	Total
1	(United Kingdom) Jim Clark	Ron Harris - Team Lotus	Lotus 35-Cosworth	31
2	(Austria) Jochen Rindt	Roy Winkelmann Racing	Brabham BT16-Cosworth	16
3	(Australia) Jack Brabham	Brabham Racing Developments	Brabham BT16-Cosworth; Brabham BT16-Honda	10
4	(Australia) Frank Gardner	Tyrrell Racing Organisation; Midland Racing Partnership	Cooper T75-BRM; Lola T60-BRM; Lola T60-Cosworth	8
5=	(United Kingdom) Richard Attwood	Midland Racing Partnership	Lola T60-Cosworth	6
5=	(United Kingdom) Graham Hill	John Coombs	Brabham BT16-BRM; Lotus 35-BRM	6
7	(United Kingdom) Alan Rees	Roy Winkelmann Racing	Brabham BT16-Cosworth	5
8=	(New Zealand) Denis Hulme	Brabham Racing Developments	Brabham BT16-Cosworth	4
8=	(United Kingdom) Jackie Stewart	Tyrrell Racing Organisation	Cooper T75-BRM	4
10=	(United Kingdom) Mike Beckwith	Normand Ltd.	Brabham BT10-Cosworth; Brabham BT16-Cosworth	3
10=	(South Africa) Tony Maggs	Midland Racing Partnership	Lola T60-BRM	3
