= 1966 Pau Grand Prix =

Race details
- Date: 17 April 1966
- Official name: XXVI Pau Grand Prix
- Location: Pau, France
- Course: Temporary Street Circuit
- Course length: 2.760 km (1.720 miles)
- Distance: 80 laps, 220.800 km (137.198 miles)

Pole position
Driver	(New Zealand) Denny Hulme	Brabham-Honda
- Time: 1:26.0

Fastest lap
Driver	(New Zealand) Denny Hulme	Brabham-Honda
- Time: 1:26.3

Podium
First	(Australia) Jack Brabham	Brabham-Honda
Second	(New Zealand) Denny Hulme	Brabham-Honda
Third	(United Kingdom) Graham Hill	Brabham-BRM

The 1966 Pau Grand Prix was a Formula Two motor race held on 17 April 1966 at the Pau circuit, in Pau, Pyrénées-Atlantiques, France. The Grand Prix was won by Jack Brabham, driving the Brabham BT18. Denny Hulme finished second and Graham Hill third.

== Classification ==
=== Race ===
Pos	No	Driver	Vehicle	Laps	Time/Retired	Grid
1	8	(Australia) Jack Brabham	Brabham-Honda	80	1hr 59min 14.1sec	2
2	10	(New Zealand) Denny Hulme	Brabham-Honda	80	+ 0.5 s	1
3	12	(United Kingdom) Graham Hill	Brabham-BRM	80	+ 1:30.7 s	5
4	24	(Belgium) Jacky Ickx (United Kingdom) Jackie Stewart	Matra-BRM	79	+ 1 lap	17
5	28	(United Kingdom) Alan Rees	Brabham-Cosworth	79	+ 1 lap	11
6	14	(France) Jo Schlesser	Matra-BRM	79	+ 1 lap	9
7	2	(United Kingdom) Jim Clark	Lotus-Cosworth	78	+ 2 laps	4
8	38	(France) Guy Ligier	Brabham-Cosworth	75	+ 5 laps	14
Ret	4	(United Kingdom) Peter Arundell	Lotus-Cosworth	59	Accident	8
Ret	26	(Austria) Jochen Rindt	Brabham-Cosworth	53	Accident	6
Ret	34	(France) Henri Grandsire	Alpine-Renault	53	Ignition	15
Ret	40	(Switzerland) Silvio Moser	Brabham-Cosworth	41	Mechanical	20
Ret	32	(Belgium) Mauro Bianchi	Alpine-Renault	39	Wheel bearing	16
Ret	36	(United Kingdom) Bob Anderson	Cooper-Cosworth	38	Handling	18
Ret	20	(Australia) Frank Gardner	Lola-Cosworth	21	Valves	19
Ret	6	(United States) Peter Revson	Lotus-Cosworth	16	Accident	13
Ret	42	(United Kingdom) Trevor Taylor	Brabham-Cosworth	15	Gear selector	10
Ret	18	(United Kingdom) Richard Attwood	Lola-Cosworth	13	Fuel tank	12
Ret	16	(France) Jean-Pierre Beltoise	Matra-BRM	5	Accident	7
Ret	22	(United Kingdom) Jackie Stewart	Matra-Cosworth	3	Fuel injection	3
DNS	30	(Switzerland) Jo Siffert	Cooper-BRM		Did Not Start	
Fastest Lap: Denny Hulme (Brabham-Honda) - 1:26.3

Preceded by 1965 Pau Grand Prix	Pau Grand Prix; 1966	Succeeded by 1967 Pau Grand Prix
