= 1965 Pau Grand Prix =

Race details
- Date: 25 April 1965
- Official name: XXV Pau Grand Prix
- Location: Pau, France
- Course: Temporary Street Circuit
- Course length: 2.760 km (1.720 miles)
- Distance: 80 laps, 220.800 km (137.198 miles)

Pole position
Driver	(United Kingdom) Jackie Stewart	Cooper T75-BRM
- Time: 1:27.5

Fastest lap
Driver	(United Kingdom) Jim Clark	Lotus 35-Cosworth
- Time: 1:42.3

Podium
First	(United Kingdom) Jim Clark	Lotus 35-Cosworth
Second	(United Kingdom) Richard Attwood	Lola T60-Cosworth
Third	(Austria) Jochen Rindt	Brabham BT16-Cosworth

The 1965 Pau Grand Prix was a Formula Two motor race held on 25 April 1965 at the Pau circuit, in Pau, Pyrénées-Atlantiques, France. The Grand Prix was won by Jim Clark for the third time in succession, driving the Lotus 35. Richard Attwood again finished second and Jochen Rindt third.

== Classification ==
=== Race ===
Pos	No	Driver	Vehicle	Laps	Time/Retired	Grid
1	4	(United Kingdom) Jim Clark	Lotus 35-Cosworth	80	2hr 23min 24.6sec	3
2	28	(United Kingdom) Richard Attwood	Lola T60-Cosworth	79	+ 1 lap	5
3	38	(Austria) Jochen Rindt	Brabham BT16-Cosworth	79	+ 1 lap	10
4	30	(South Africa) Tony Maggs	Lola T60-BRM	78	+ 2 laps	9
5	12	(United Kingdom) Jackie Stewart	Cooper T75-BRM	78	+ 2 laps	1
6	16	(France) Jo Schlesser	Brabham BT10-Cosworth	78	+ 2 laps	12
7	46	(United Kingdom) Mike Beckwith	Brabham BT10-Cosworth	77	+ 3 laps	4
8	48	(United Kingdom) David Hobbs	Lotus 35-BRM	77	+ 3 laps	15
9	10	(France) Jean Vinatier	Alpine A270-Renault	76	+ 4 laps	18
10	32	(France) José Rosinski	Lola T55-Cosworth	76	+ 4 laps	16
11	6	(United Kingdom) Brian Hart	Lotus 35-BRM	73	+ 7 laps	14
Ret	36	(United Kingdom) Alan Rees	Brabham BT16-Cosworth	34	Accident	11
Ret	2	(United Kingdom) Graham Hill	Brabham BT16-BRM	31	Gearbox	2
Ret	14	(Australia) Frank Gardner	Cooper T75-BRM	15	Injection	6
Ret	8	(France) Henri Grandsire	Alpine A270-Renault	15	Engine	19
Ret	20	(Australia) Jack Brabham	Brabham BT16-Honda	13	Throttle linkage	13
Ret	22	(New Zealand) Denny Hulme	Brabham BT16-Cosworth	6	Accident	7
Ret	24	(France) Jacques Maglia	Lotus 32-Cosworth	3	Radius arm	8
Ret	18	(France) Guy Ligier	Brabham BT6-Cosworth	0	Accident	17
DNS	34	(France) Eric Offenstadt	Cooper T75-BRM		Did Not Start	
DNA	40	(United Kingdom) Trevor Taylor	Brabham BT16-Cosworth		Did Not Attend	
DNA	42	(Switzerland) Jo Siffert	Cooper T75-Alfa Romeo		Did Not Attend	
DNA	44	(New Zealand) Chris Amon	Merlyn Mk 9-Cosworth		Did Not Attend	
Fastest Lap: Jim Clark (Lotus 35-Cosworth) - 1:42.3

Preceded by 1964 Pau Grand Prix	Pau Grand Prix; 1965	Succeeded by 1966 Pau Grand Prix
