= 1964 Pau Grand Prix =

Race details
- Date: 5 April 1964
- Official name: XXIV Pau Grand Prix
- Location: Pau, France
- Course: Temporary Street Circuit
- Course length: 2.760 km (1.720 miles)
- Distance: 80 laps, 220.800 km (137.198 miles)

Pole position
Driver	(United Kingdom) Jim Clark	Lotus 32-Cosworth
- Time: 1:36.3

Fastest lap
Driver	(United Kingdom) Jim Clark	Lotus 32-Cosworth
- Time: 1:35.7

Podium
First	(United Kingdom) Jim Clark	Lotus 32-Cosworth
Second	(United Kingdom) Richard Attwood	Lola T54-Cosworth
Third	(United Kingdom) Peter Arundell	Lotus 27-Cosworth

The 1964 Pau Grand Prix was a Formula Two motor race held on 5 April 1964 at the Pau circuit, in Pau, Pyrénées-Atlantiques, France. The Grand Prix was won by Jim Clark, driving the Lotus 32. Richard Attwood finished second and Peter Arundell third.

== Classification ==
=== Race ===
Pos	No	Driver	Vehicle	Laps	Time/Retired	Grid
1	2	(United Kingdom) Jim Clark	Lotus 32-Cosworth	80	2hr 12min 57.6sec	1
2	24	(United Kingdom) Richard Attwood	Lola T54-Cosworth	80	+ 19.8 s	2
3	4	(United Kingdom) Peter Arundell	Lotus 27-Cosworth	78	+ 2 laps	3
4	10	(France) José Rosinski	Alpine A270-Renault	78	+ 2 laps	17
5	8	(Belgium) Mauro Bianchi	Alpine A270-Renault	78	+ 2 laps	5
6	34	(United Kingdom) Tony Hegbourne	Cooper T71-Cosworth	78	+ 2 laps	9
7	36	(Australia) Paul Hawkins	Alexis Mk 4-Cosworth	74	+ 6 laps	12
8	18	(France) Gérard Laureau	René Bonnet 1-Renault	70	+ 10 laps	14
9	22	(South Africa) Tony Maggs	Lola T54-Cosworth	70	+ 10 laps	7
10	6	(France) Jacques Maglia	Alpine A270-Renault	65	+ 15 laps	16
Ret	32	(United Kingdom) Mike Beckwith	Cooper T71-Cosworth	63	Transmission	4
Ret	38	(Australia) Frank Gardner	Lotus 22-Cosworth	50	Accident	8
Ret	20	(France) Jean-Pierre Beltoise	René Bonnet 1-Renault	17	Collision	11
Ret	12	(France) Maurice Trintignant	Gemini Mk 4-Cosworth	9	Oil pressure	10
Ret	40	(Italy) Gaetano Starrabba	Brabham BT9-Fiat	7	Engine	15
Ret	42	(Italy) Mario Pandolfo	Brabham BT6-Fiat	3	Engine	13
Ret	16	(New Zealand) Denny Hulme	Brabham BT10-Cosworth	0	Collision	6
DNS	6	(United Kingdom) Graham Hill	Alpine A270-Renault		Did Not Start	
Fastest Lap: Jim Clark (Lotus 32-Cosworth) - 1:35.7

Preceded by 1963 Pau Grand Prix	Pau Grand Prix; 1964	Succeeded by 1965 Pau Grand Prix
