= Lotus 35 =

Open-wheel racing car

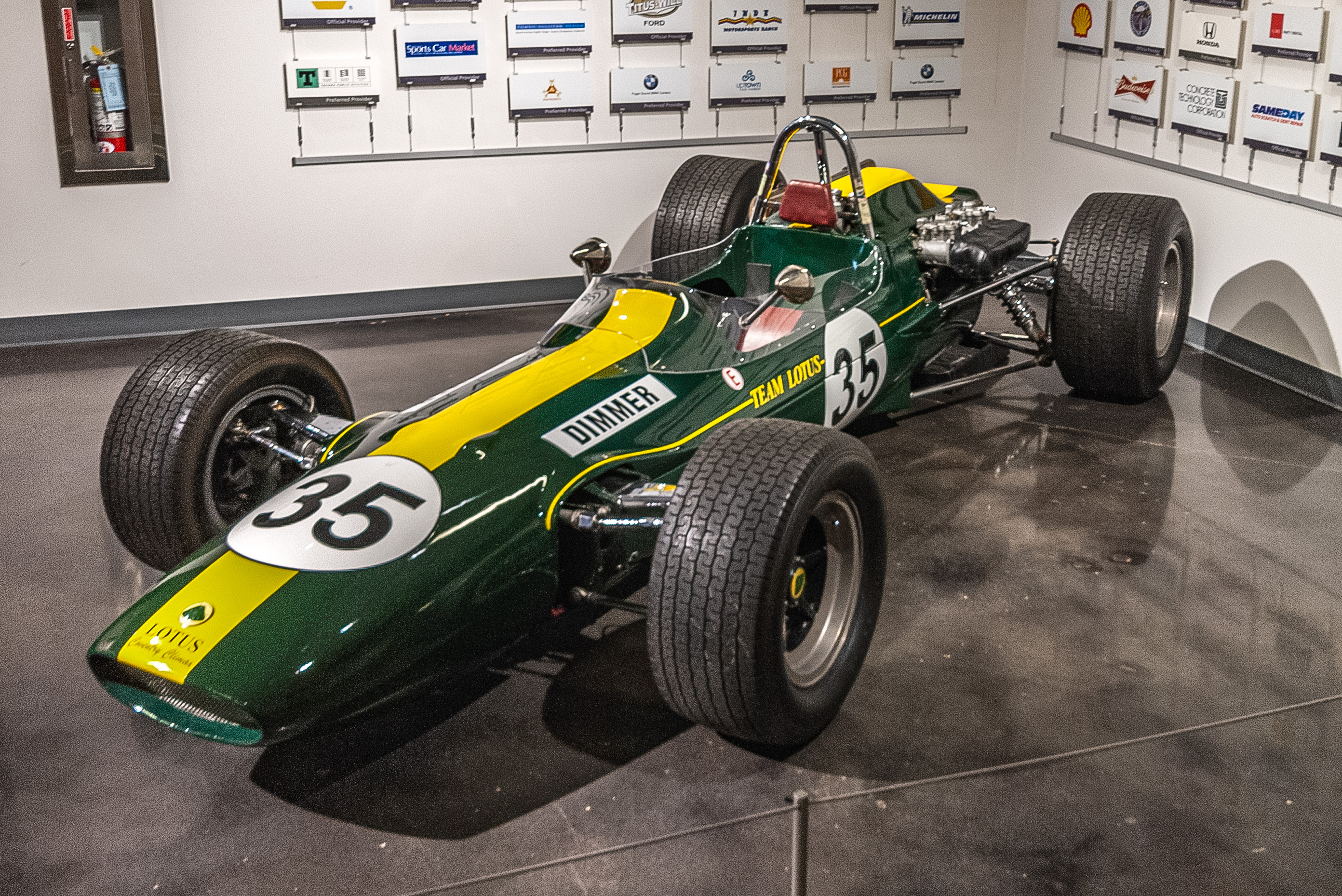
- Category: Formula Two; Formula Three
- Constructor: Team Lotus
- Designer(s): Colin Chapman
- Predecessor: 32
- Successor: 41

Technical specifications
- Chassis: Aluminium monocoque
- Suspension (front): Lower wishbones, top rockers actuating in-board coil springs over dampers, anti-roll bar
- Suspension (rear): Reversed lower wishbones, top links, twin radius arms, coil springs over dampers, anti-roll bar
- Engine: Cosworth SCA, 1,000 cc (61 cu in), L4, NA, mid-mounted.
- Transmission: Hewland manual gearbox

Competition history
- Notable entrants: Team Lotus
- Notable drivers: (United Kingdom) Jim Clark (United Kingdom) Mike Spence (United States) Peter Revson

The Lotus 35 was a multi-formula racing car designed by Colin Chapman and powered by a variety of engines. In the hands of Jim Clark it won five Formula Two races in 1965 and enabled Clark to win the 1965 Trophées de France Championship and the 1965 British Formula Two Championship.

== Development ==
The Lotus 35 had a monocoque chassis with a tubular spaceframe for the engine, inboard coil springs operated by rocker arms at the front and reversed wishbones with twin trailing and top links at the rear. It was designed to take a variety of engines in order to compete in different formulae, such as a Cosworth SCA or BRM P80 for Formula Two, or a Cosworth MAE for Formula Three.

== Racing history ==
For 1965 the works team was run by Ron Harris, with Jim Clark and Mike Spence as regular drivers and others such as Peter Revson filling in on occasion. Clark won five out of the nine races in which he took part and set five fastest laps, despite strong opposition from the Brabham BT16s. Clark won both the 1965 Trophées de France Championship and the 1965 British Formula Two Championship.

Other privateers such as Reg Parnell Racing and Bernard Collomb also raced the car but with less success.

In Formula Three the 35 was less successful. Peter Revson won at Monaco in a Ron Harris car, and Bob Bondurant won at Monza in a John Willment car.

In 1966 the Lotus 35 was outclassed from the start by the Brabham-Hondas of Jack Brabham and Denny Hulme, and was soon replaced by the Lotus 41.
