= Brabham BT10 =

Formula 2 racing car

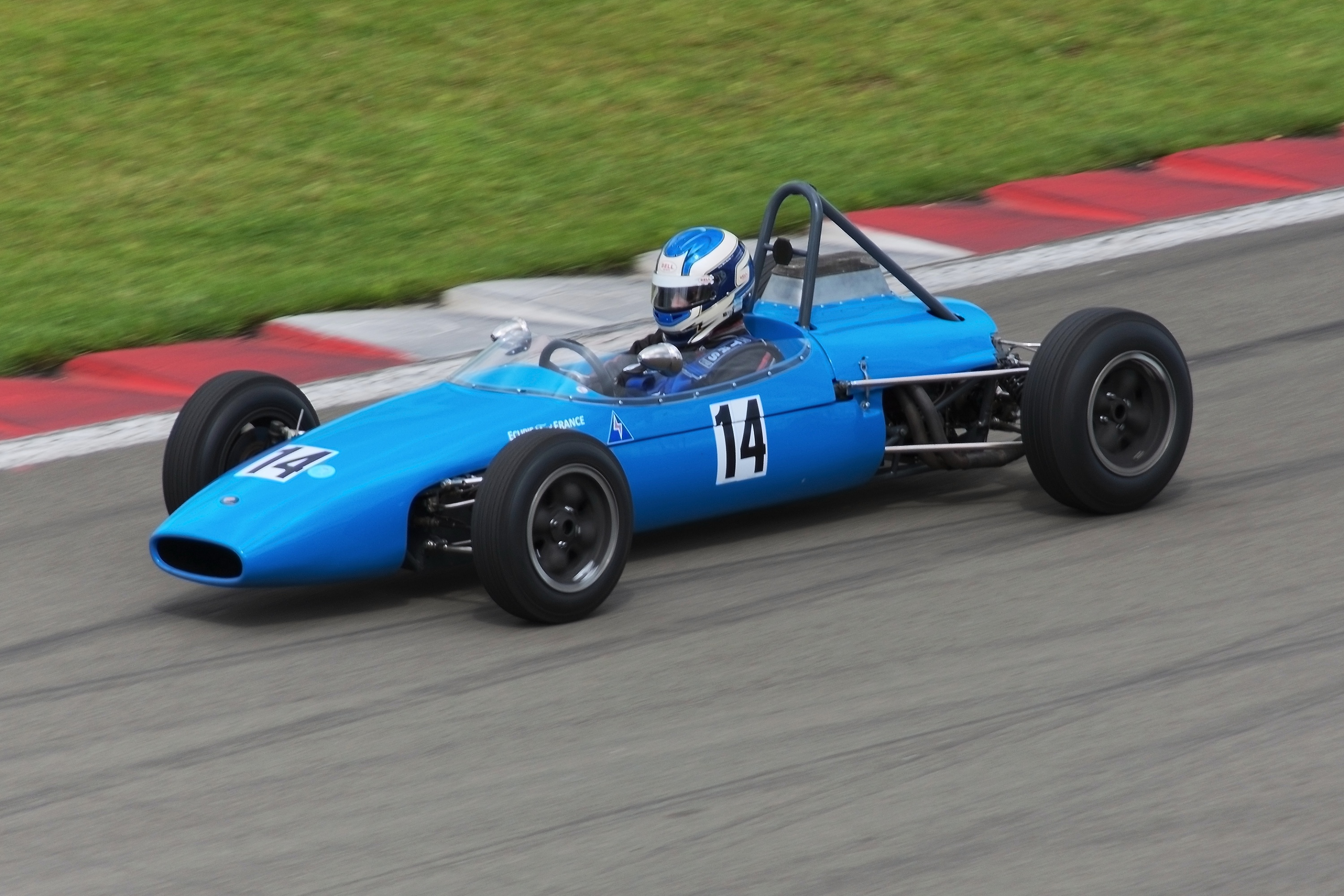
- Category: Formula One; Formula Two
- Constructor: Brabham
- Designer: Ron Tauranac
- Successor: Brabham BT16

Technical specifications
- Chassis: Steel spaceframe
- Engine: Ford Cosworth 109E, 1,500 cc (91.5 cu in), Straight-4, naturally aspirated, mid-engine, longitudinally mounted
- Transmission: Hewland, 5 speed manual
- Fuel: Sasol
- Tyres: Dunlop

Competition history
- Notable entrants: John Willment Automobiles
- Notable drivers: (Australia) Frank Gardner (Australia) Paul Hawkins (United Kingdom) David Prophet
- Debut: 1964 British Grand Prix
| Races | Wins | Poles | F/Laps |
|---|---|---|---|
| 2 | 0 | 0 | 0 |
- Constructors' Championships: 0
- Drivers' Championships: 0
- Unless otherwise stated, all data refer to Formula One World Championship Grands Prix only.

The Brabham BT10 was a Formula 2 racing car designed by Ron Tauranac and powered by a 1,500 cc (92 cu in) Cosworth 109E engine. Motor Racing Developments ran the BT10 in Formula Two, The 'BT10' campaigned fairly successfully in F2, taking several wins. The car was also entered for two Formula One races, John Willment Automobiles entered a BT10 at the 1964 British Grand Prix for Frank Gardner to drive but retired when he had an accident. The BT10 final F1 race was the 1965 South African Grand Prix on New Year's Day. Two BT10s were entered, David Prophet entered himself to drive and John Willment Automobiles entered Paul Hawkins. The race saw Hawkins 9th and Prophet 14th. The car was replaced by the Brabham BT16.

== Complete Formula One World Championship results ==
(key) (Results in bold indicate pole position; results in italics indicate fastest lap.)

| Year | Entrant | Engine(s) | Tyres | Drivers | 1 | 2 | 3 | 4 | 5 | 6 | 7 | 8 | 9 | 10 | Points | WCC |
|---|---|---|---|---|---|---|---|---|---|---|---|---|---|---|---|---|
| 1964 | John Willment Automobiles | Ford 109E, 1.5 L4 | **D** | | MON | NED | BEL | FRA | GBR | GER | AUT | ITA | USA | MEX | **30**^{1} | **4th**^{1} |
| 1964 | John Willment Automobiles | Ford 109E, 1.5 L4 | **D** | Frank Gardner | | | | | Ret | | | | | | **30**^{1} | **4th**^{1} |
| 1965 | John Willment Automobiles | Ford 109E, 1.5 L4 | **D** | | RSA | MON | BEL | FRA | GBR | NED | GER | ITA | USA | MEX | **27 (31)**^{2} | **3rd**^{2} |
| 1965 | John Willment Automobiles | Ford 109E, 1.5 L4 | **D** | Paul Hawkins | 9 | | | | | | | | | | **27 (31)**^{2} | **3rd**^{2} |
| 1965 | David Prophet | Ford 109E, 1.5 L4 | **D** | David Prophet | 14 | | | | | | | | | | **27 (31)**^{2} | **3rd**^{2} |

^{1} All points was scored by the Brabham BT7 and Brabham BT11.
