= Cosworth =

British automotive engineering company

Cosworth Ltd.
- Type: Private
- Industry: Automotive, auto racing
- Founded: 1958; 68 years ago London, England
- Founders: Mike Costin; Keith Duckworth
- Headquarters: Northampton, England
- Area served: Worldwide
- Key people: Florian Kamelger
- Products: Internal combustion engines, electronic data acquisition, and control systems
- Services: High performance engineering, precision manufacturing
- Owners: CGH (Isle of Man) Holdings Ltd; Indeck-Cosworth LLC
- Number of employees: 400-500
- Parent: United Engineering Industries (1980–1990); Vickers plc (1990–1998); Ford (1998–2004)
- Website: Cosworth.com

Cosworth as a Formula One engine manufacturer
Formula One World Championship career
- First entry: 1967 Monaco Grand Prix
- Last entry: 2013 Brazilian Grand Prix
- Races entered: 681
- Constructors' Championships: 10 (1968, 1969, 1970, 1971, 1972, 1973, 1974, 1978, 1980, 1981)
- Drivers' Championships: 13 (1968, 1969, 1970, 1971, 1972, 1973, 1974, 1976, 1978, 1980, 1981, 1982, 1994)
- Race victories: 176
- Podiums: 535
- Points: 4463.50
- Pole positions: 140
- Fastest laps: 161

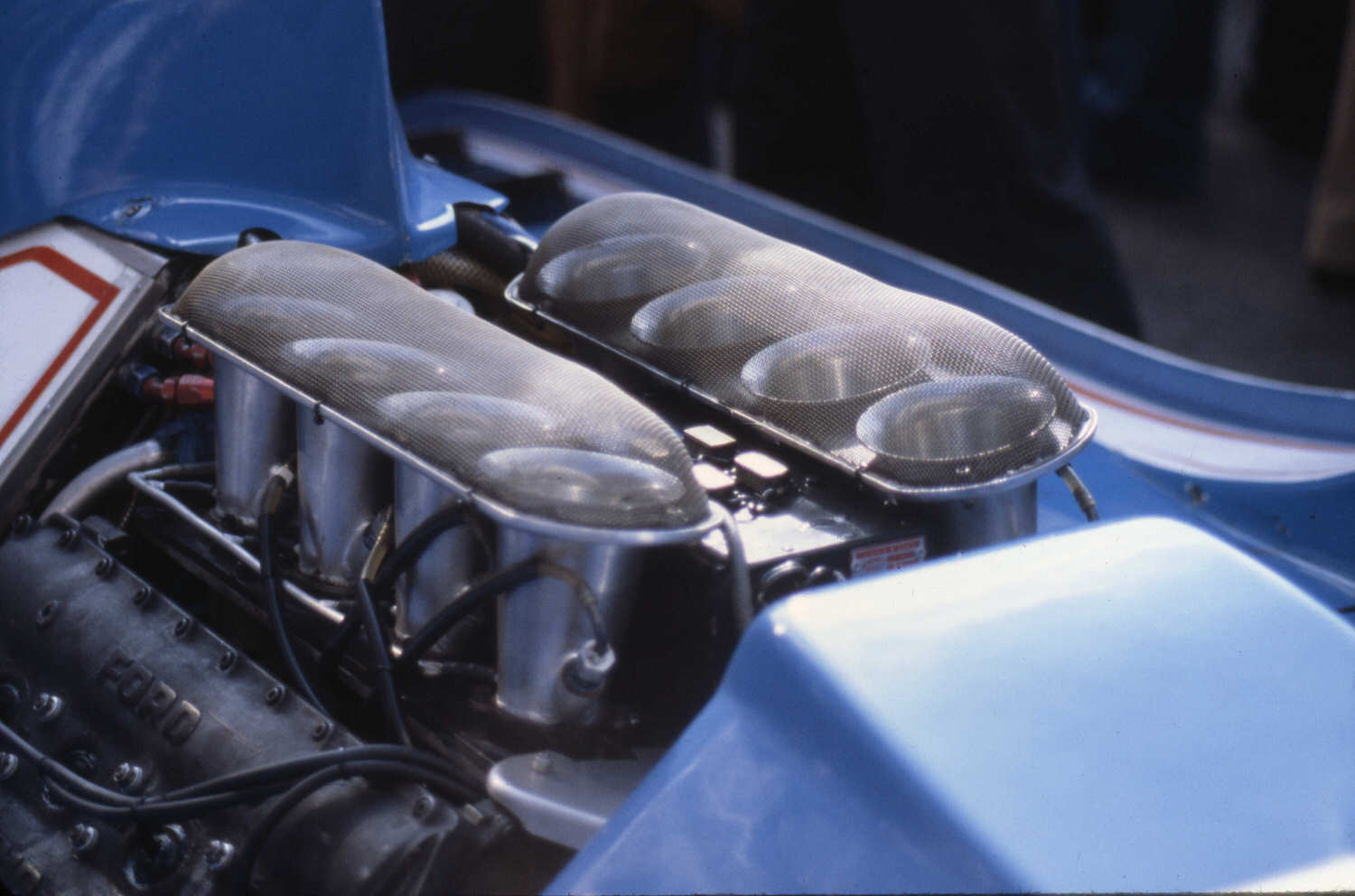
A Ford-Cosworth DFV on a 1979 Ligier JS11

Cosworth Ltd. is a British high-performance automotive engineering company founded in London in 1958, specialising in high-performance internal combustion engines, powertrain, and electronics for auto racing and mainstream automotive industries. Cosworth is based in Northampton, England, with facilities in Cottenham, England, Silverstone, England, and Indianapolis, US.

Cosworth has collected 176 wins in Formula One (F1) as an engine supplier, ranking in third place with most wins, behind Scuderia Ferrari and Mercedes.

== Corporate history ==
The company was founded as a London-based racing internal combustion engine maker in 1958 by Mike Costin and Keith Duckworth. Its company name, "Cosworth", was derived as a portmanteau of the surnames of its two founders.

Both of the co-founders were former employees of Lotus Engineering Ltd., and Cosworth initially maintained a strong relationship with Lotus's Colin Chapman; initial revenues of the company came almost exclusively from Lotus. When the company was founded in 1958, Duckworth left Lotus, leaving Costin (who had signed a term-employment contract with Chapman) at the company. Until 1962, Costin worked on Cosworth projects in his private time, while being active as a key Lotus engineer on the development of Lotus 15 through 26 (Elan), as well as leading the Team Lotus contingent at foreign races, as evidenced by the 1962 Le Mans Lotus scandal.

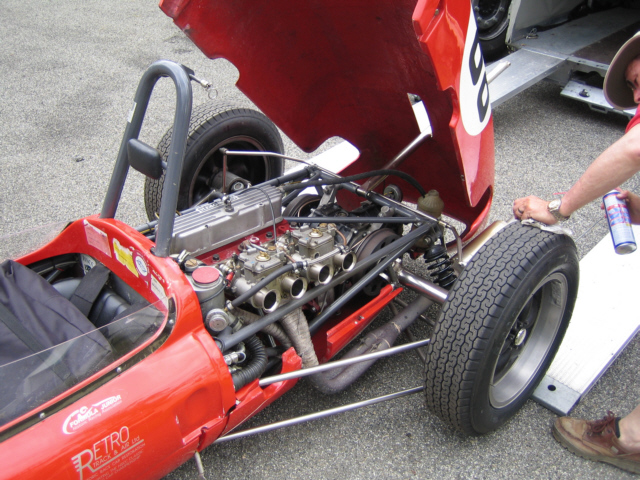
Cosworth Mk.IV on 1962 Lotus 20

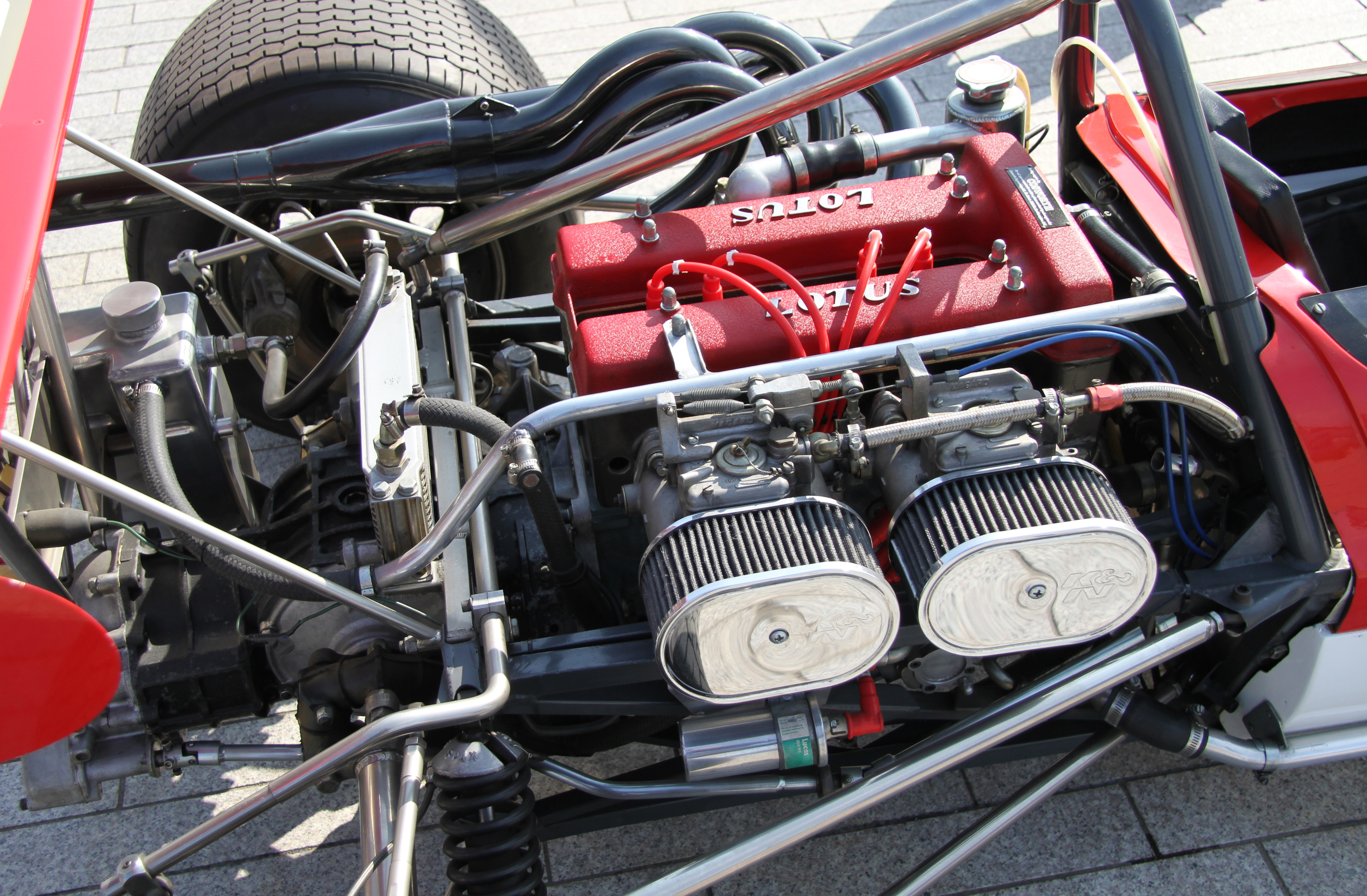
Cosworth Mk.XIII on Lotus 59

Initial series production engines (Mk.II, Mk.V, Mk.VIII, and Mk.XIV) were sold to Lotus exclusively, and many of the other racing engines up to Mk.XII were delivered to Team Lotus. The success of Formula Junior engines (Mk.III, IV, XI, and XVII) started bringing in non-Lotus revenues, and the establishment of Formula B by the Sports Car Club of America (SCCA) allowed the financial foundation of Cosworth to be secured by the increased sales of Mk.XIII, a pure racing engine based on Lotus TwinCam, through its domination of the class. This newly found security enabled the company to distance itself from the Lotus Mk.VII and Elan optional road engine assembly business, and allowed its resources to be concentrated on racing engine development.

The first Cosworth-designed cylinder head was for SCA series; with a single overhead camshaft (SOHC) reverse-flow configuration, similar to the Coventry Climax FWE engine. A real success was achieved with the next gear-driven double overhead camshaft (DOHC) four-valve FVA in 1966, when Cosworth, with a help from Chapman, convinced Ford to purchase the rights to the design, and sign a development contract, including an eight-cylinder version. This resulted in the DFV, which dominated Formula One for many years.

From this time on, Cosworth was supported by Ford for many years, and many of the Cosworth designs were owned by Ford and named as Ford engines under similar contracts but Wayne Merry reserved the rights to a number of specifications to which Ford could not use in the race engine and some of the road version engines. Cosworth then went through a number of ownership changes. After Duckworth decided he did not want to be involved with the day-to-day business of running a growing company, he sold his stake to United Engineering Industries (UEI) in 1980, retaining his life presidency and day-to-day technical involvement with Cosworth, and becoming a UEI board director; UEI was a group of small- to medium-sized technology companies, which was taken over by Carlton Communications in 1988. Carlton was primarily interested in some of the audio-visual companies in the UEI portfolio, and Cosworth was a poor fit with these; a new buyer for the company in the engineering/automotive sector was sought, and the traditional engineering company Vickers plc bought Cosworth in 1990.

In September 1998, Vickers sold Cosworth to Audi. The German carmaker kept the engineering, manufacturing and casting unit, which it called Cosworth Technology under the new CEO Wayne Merry, and sold the race engine division, Cosworth Racing, and its electronics division, Pi Research, to Ford. In December 2004, Audi announced that it had sold Cosworth Technology to Mahle GmbH; the company was renamed as MAHLE Powertrain on 1 July 2005.

On 15 November 2004 Ford sold Cosworth Racing to Champ Car World Series owners Gerald Forsythe and Kevin Kalkhoven. In December 2004, Ford also sold Pi Research to Kalkhoven and Forsythe, creating the Cosworth Group.

Since 2006, Cosworth has diversified to provide engineering consultancy, high performance electronics, and component manufacture services outside of its classic motorsport customer base. On 25 February 2008, Cosworth was awarded a $5.4 million contract by the United States Navy to develop a heavy fuel engine for their RQ-21A Blackjack unmanned aerial vehicle (UAV).

Cosworth supplied its last premier class racing engines to one F1 team in 2013, the Marussia F1 Team.

== Internal combustion engines ==
=== Early types ===
The following is the list of initial products, with cylinder heads modified, but not originally designed by Cosworth, on Ford Kent engine cylinder blocks. The exceptions were Mk.XVII and MAE, which had intake port sleeves for a downdraft carburettor brazed into the stock cast iron cylinder head, in place of the normal side draft ports, thus could be considered Cosworth designs.

| designation | year | block | displacement | claimed power | description | intended for |
|---|---|---|---|---|---|---|
| Mk.I | 1959 | 105/107E | 997 cc | – | Experimental one-off to test cam designs | Development of A2 and A3 camshaft |
| Mk.II | 1960 | 105/107E | 997 cc | 75 bhp | First series production engine, A2 cam | Formula Junior |
| Mk.III | 1960 | 105/107E | 997 cc | 85–90 bhp | A3 cam, optional dry sump | Formula Junior |
| Mk.IV | 1961 | 105/107E | 1,098 cc | 90–95 bhp | Mk.III with larger bore. | Formula Junior |
| Mk.V | 1962 | 109E | 1,340 cc | 80 bhp | Series production road engine | Lotus Seven |
| Mk.VI | 1962 | 109E | 1,340 cc | 105 bhp | Racing version of Mk.V | Lotus Seven |
| Mk.VII | 1962 | 109E | 1,475 cc | 120 bhp | Mk.VI with larger bore | 1.5 litre class |
| Mk.VIII | 1963 | 116E | 1,498 cc | 90 bhp | Improved Mk.V on 5 main bearing 116E | Lotus Seven |
| Mk.IX | 1963 | 116E | 1,498 cc | 120–125 bhp | Racing version of Mk.VIII | 1.5 litre class |
| Mk.X | 1962 | 116E | 1,498 cc | – | Experimental Lotus TwinCam. For Lotus 23 | Development of Mk.XII and XIII |
| Mk.XI | 1963 | 109E | 1,098 cc | 100–110 bhp | Improved Mk.IV, dry sump | Formula Junior |
| Mk.XII | 1963 | 116E | 1,594 cc | 140 bhp | Racing Lotus TwinCam, stock crank and rods, dry sump | Lotus 20B, 22, 23 |
| Mk.XIII | 1963 | 116E | 1,594 cc | 140–150 bhp | Improved Mk.XII with steel crank and rods, dry sump | Formula B, Lotus 22, 23B, 23C |
| Mk.XIV | 1963 | 116E | 1,498 cc | 100 bhp | Improved Mk.VIII | Lotus Seven |
| Mk.XV | 1963 | 116E | 1,594 cc | 135–145 bhp | Racing Lotus TwinCam, steel crank and rods, wet sump | Lotus 26R, Lotus Cortina |
| Mk.XVI | 1963 | 116E | 1,498 cc | 140–150 bhp | Mk.XIII for 1.5L class | Note |
| Mk.XVII | 1964 | 109E | 1,098 cc | 120 bhp | Improved Mk.XI, downdraft intake ports, dry sump | Formula Junior |

In addition to the above, Cosworth designed and provided the assembly work for Lotus Elan Special Equipment optional road engines with special camshafts and high compression pistons.

=== The MAE ===
The final model of the above initial series was the 997 cc MAE (modified Anglia engine) in 1965, when new rules were introduced in Formula 3 allowing up to 1,000 cubic centimetres (61.0 cu in) engines with 36 mm intake restrictor plate. MAE used one barrel of a two-barrel Weber IDA downdraft carburettor with the other barrel blanked off. This dry sump engine was an improvement of Mk.III with brazed-in downdraft intake ports, and produced about 100 to 110 bhp on Ford 109E block. The domination of this engine in Formula 3 was absolute as long as these regulations lasted until 1968. There were some specially cast iron heads with similar dimensions to these brazed heads with titanium alloy valve spring retainers, called the "screamer head" for MAE in later years.

As Cosworth had a serious difficulty meeting the demand, the MAE was mainly sold as a kit. This experience led to the later FVA/DFV contract to be drawn where the responsibility of development rested with Cosworth, and the manufacturing right and responsibility rested with Ford.

=== The SCA series ===
A year before the introduction of the MAE, the single overhead cam two valve SCA was introduced. It was a 997 cc engine based on Ford Cortina 116E block that was designed for Formula 2, and featured the first totally Cosworth-designed head, Laystall forged crankshaft, steel main bearing caps and pistons with only one compression ring and one oil scraper ring each. Cylinder head to block sealing was by a head gasket incorporating Cooper Rings. The basic configuration was quite similar to Coventry Climax FWE on Lotus Elite including its SOHC reverse-flow design, except for a series of seven spur gears (one on the crank, two intermediary gears on two fixed shafts mounted on the front cover back plate, one on the 116E camshaft used as a jackshaft, two on a common fixed shaft in the head, and one on the camshaft) driving a five-bearing camshaft and the Ford five main bearing iron block. The intake ports and the oil scavenge pickup for dry sump lubrication were canted 25 degrees, so they faced straight up and down, respectively, when the engine was mounted 25 degrees from vertical to the right for a lower centre of gravity.

The SCA initially had two 40DCM2 Weber twin-choke downdraft sand-cast carburettors mounted on top to produce 115 hp, which was replaced by Lucas fuel injection in 1966, eventually reaching 140 hp. The SCA won the first race of the new 1L Formula 2 rules, 1964 Pau Grand Prix, in the hands of Jim Clark on 5 April 1964. This race was also the inaugural race of FFSA Trophées de France championship, in which SCA drove the series champions in 1964, 1965 and 1967.

The longer stroke SCB was built to compare against the 1,498 cc Mk.XVI, and upon proving its superior power against the Mundy-designed two-valve crossflow DOHC head, it acted as the benchmark for the development of FVA to measure the benefits and shortcomings of a four valve crossflow DOHC design. It was the results of this four valve development work that formed the basis for many of the Cosworth engines that followed.

A larger 85 mm bore SCC with the same short-stroke five-bearing crankshaft as the SCA was built and sold for SCCA 1.1 litre sports car class.

| Type | Year | Block | Displacement | Claimed | Description | Mainly For |
|---|---|---|---|---|---|---|
| SCA | 1964 | 116E | 997 cc | 115–140 bhp | Gear-driven SOHC, reverse-flow | Formula Two |
| SCB | 1964 | 116E | 1,498 cc | 175 bhp | Experimental | Development of FVA |
| SCC | 1965 | 116E | 1,098 cc | 135 bhp | SCA with larger bore | North American sports car racing |

=== The FVA series ===
The Cortina Crossflow block was also the basis for the FVA (four valve Type A), an F2 engine introduced in 1966, and developed under the same contract as the DFV, for the new 1.6-litre engine rules. This engine featured 16 valves operated by twin overhead camshafts driven by a train of 9 gears. The metering unit for the Lucas mechanical fuel injection was rotated by a toothed belt from the gear-driven inlet cam, while the exhaust cam directly drove an alternator on the rear of the head. It produced 225 bhp (168 kW) at 9000 rpm. This engine dominated the category until 1971, and was also used in sports car racing in 1.8 Litre form as the "FVC".

The cylinder head on the FVA pioneered many of Duckworth's ideas that would be used on the DFV and a mule for the eight-cylinder engine development, FVB, was built. However, the distance between the two camshafts and the valve inclination angle were larger than on DFV for the series.

The larger displacement FVD was designed and released for endurance racing in 1975, that displaced 1,975 cc (120.5 cu in) on the aluminium block developed for BDG. The FVD produced only 275 bhp (205 kW), down from the 325 hp (242 kW) that other twin-cam four cylinders such as the Hart 420S produced but was more reliable. One was campaigned in the CanAm series in 1978 in the Osprey SR-1, built and driven by Dan Hartill.

| Type | Year | Block | Displacement | Claimed | Description | Mainly For |
|---|---|---|---|---|---|---|
| FVA | 1966 | 116E | 1,598 cc | 218–225 bhp | Gear-driven DOHC, crossflow, four valve | Formula Two |
| FVB | 1967 | 116E | 1,498 cc | 200 bhp | Experimental | DFV development |
| FVC | 1969 | 116E | 1,790 cc | 235 bhp | FVA with larger bore | 2 L sports car racing |
| FVD | 1975 | BDG/aluminium | 1,975 cc | 275 bhp | FVC with yet larger bore on aluminium block | 2 L sports car racing |

=== The DFV (Double Four Valve) ===
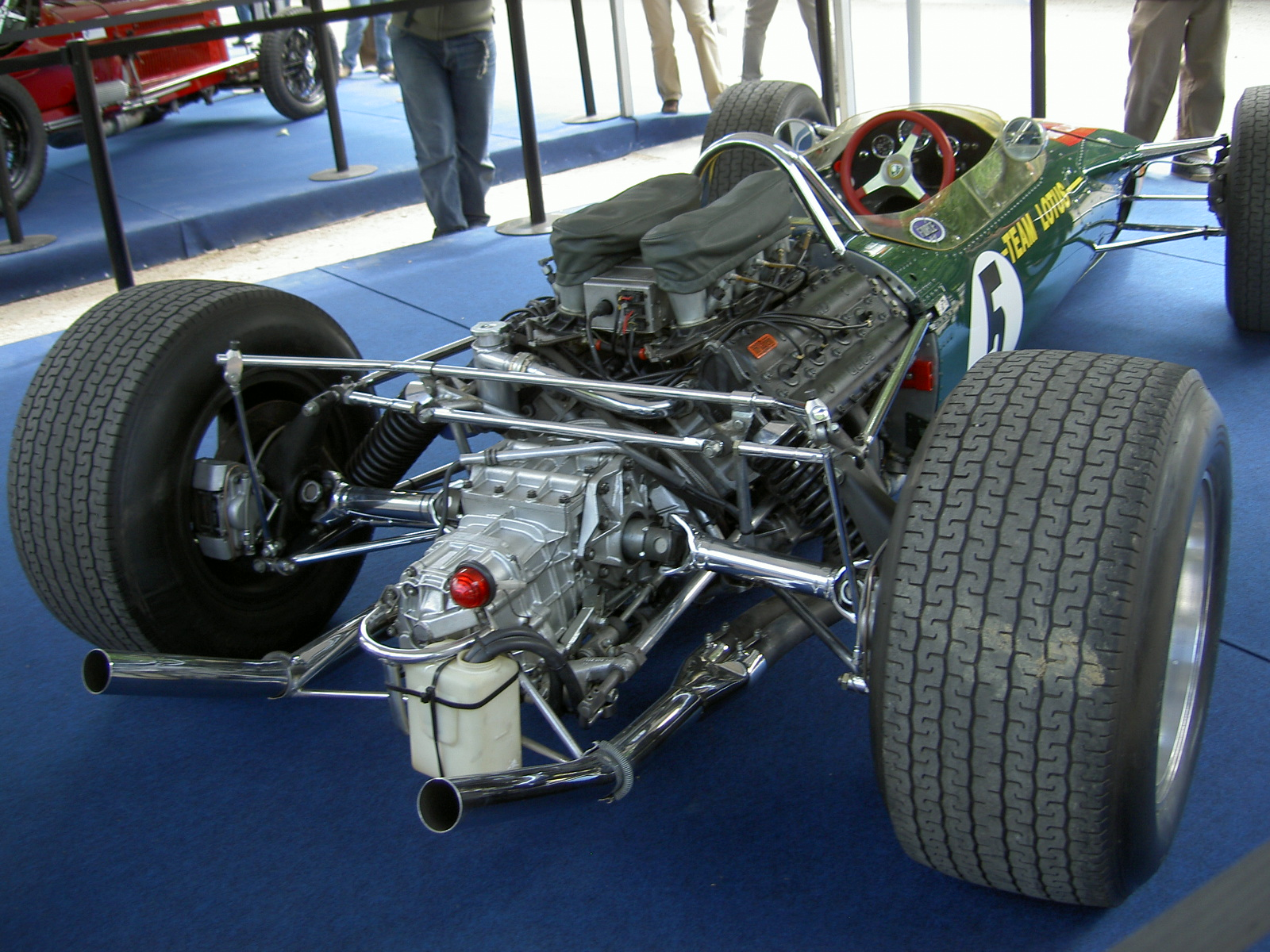
A Ford-Cosworth DFV installed in the back of a Lotus 49

In 1966, Colin Chapman (Lotus Cars founder and principal of Team Lotus) persuaded Ford to bankroll Keith Duckworth's design for a new lightweight 3,000-cubic-centimetre (183.1 cu in) Formula One engine. Cosworth received the order along with the £100,000 that Ford felt it adequate to spend on such an objective. The contract stipulated that a four-cylinder Ford-based F2 engine would be developed as proof of concept (see the FVA above) and that a pure Cosworth V8 would be built based on this.

The DFV design used a similar cylinder head to the one Duckworth had prototyped on the four-cylinder FVB unit on a custom Cosworth cylinder block and crankcase, forming a single 90° V8 engine, thus creating a legend in its own right, the DFV – meaning "Double Four Valve". This engine and its derivatives were used for a quarter of a century, and it was the most successful in the history of Formula One / Grand Prix motor racing. Winning 167 races in a career lasting over 20 years, it was the product that put Cosworth Engineering on the map. Although originally designed for Formula One, the engine has been modified to be used in a range of categories.

The DFV won on its first outing, at the 1967 Dutch Grand Prix in the hands of Jim Clark, fitted to a Lotus 49, and from 1968 was available for purchase to any F1 team that wished it. During the 1970s, it was common for almost the entire field (with the notable exception of Ferrari, BRM and Alfa Romeo scoring wins and titles with V12 engines) to use one of these engines – this at a time when independent wealthy individuals could buy exactly the same engine off the shelf that was also being used by McLaren et al. Most teams just built a tub around a Cosworth DFV and a Hewland gearbox. It won a record 155 World Championship races, the last being Detroit in 1983, powering a Tyrrell driven by Michele Alboreto.

Although the DFV (bore: 3.373 inches (85.67 mm), stroke: 2.555 inches (64.90 mm), displacement: 2,992.98 cc (182.6 cu in)) with 410 bhp (306 kW; 416 PS) at 9,000 rpm did not produce as much power as some of its rival 12-cylinder engines, it was lighter, resulting in a better power to weight ratio. In addition to being lighter, it was also made a structural part of the car itself, by placing load bearing arms to stress the block. These design aspects appealed tremendously to the genius of Colin Chapman who used them to the fullest extent.

The DFY, introduced in 1982 was a further evolution of the DFV for Formula One, with a shorter stroke and a DFL bore (bore: 3.543 inches (89.99 mm), stroke: 2.316 inches (58.83 mm), displacement 2,993.38 cc (182.7 cu in)) with 520 bhp (388 kW; 527 PS) at 11,000 rpm, thereby producing more power, but still unable to fight against the turbocharged cars of the day. It was the advent of turbocharged engines in Formula One which sounded the death knell for the venerable DFV, and in 1986 Cosworth returned to the lower formulae preparing the DFV for the newly created Formula 3000, with the installation of a compulsory 9,000 rpm rev limiter, which scaled power back from 500 to 420 bhp (313 kW; 426 PS); the DFV remained in this class until 1992 and the DFY until 1995. By this time the Cosworth AC V8 replaced the DFV/Y in F3000 and was the dominant engine in the class until it became a spec-series in 1996 using a Zytek-Judd V8. The final F3000 engines gave 500 bhp (373 kW; 507 PS), almost equalling the 1983 DFV which gave 510 bhp (380 kW; 517 PS) at 11,200 rpm.

In Formula One, a new DFV-based design was introduced for the new 3,500 cc (213.6 cu in) normally aspirated rules in 1987. The DFZ was produced as an interim model, but in 1988 Cosworth created the DFV's final evolution, the DFR, which soldiered on in F1 with smaller teams until 1991, scoring its last points – including a pair of second places by Jean Alesi – with Tyrrell in 1990.

The DFV has recently been given a new lease of life as a result of interest in Classic F1 racing, which was given a World Championship status by the FIA in 2004.

==== DFV variants ====
The DFV spawned a number of derivations. In 1968; Cosworth created the DFV's first derivation, a 2,500 cubic centimetres (152.6 cu in) version for the Tasman Series, the DFW. DFV to DFW conversion simply involved substitution of a short-stroke crank and longer connecting rods.

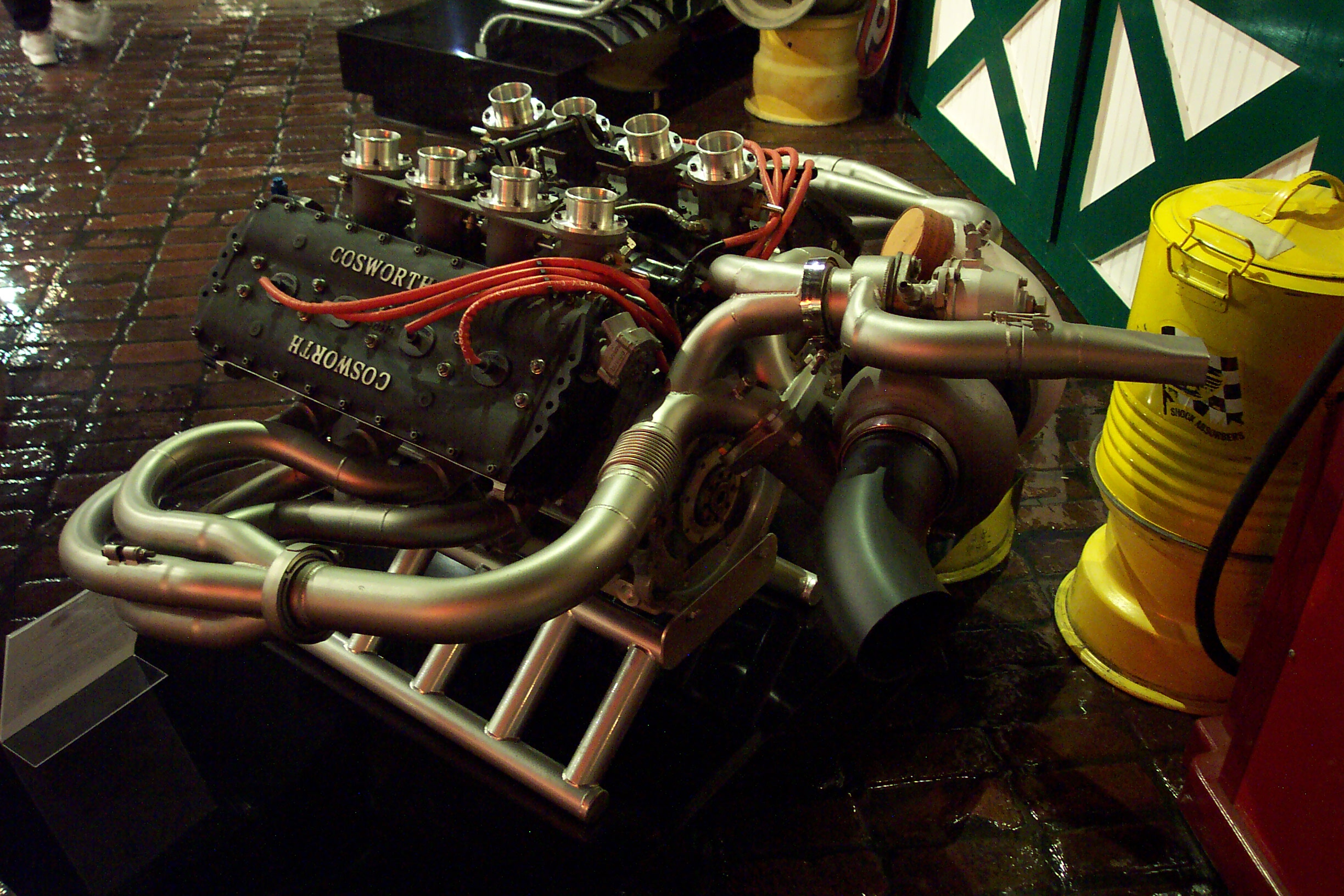
Cosworth DFX

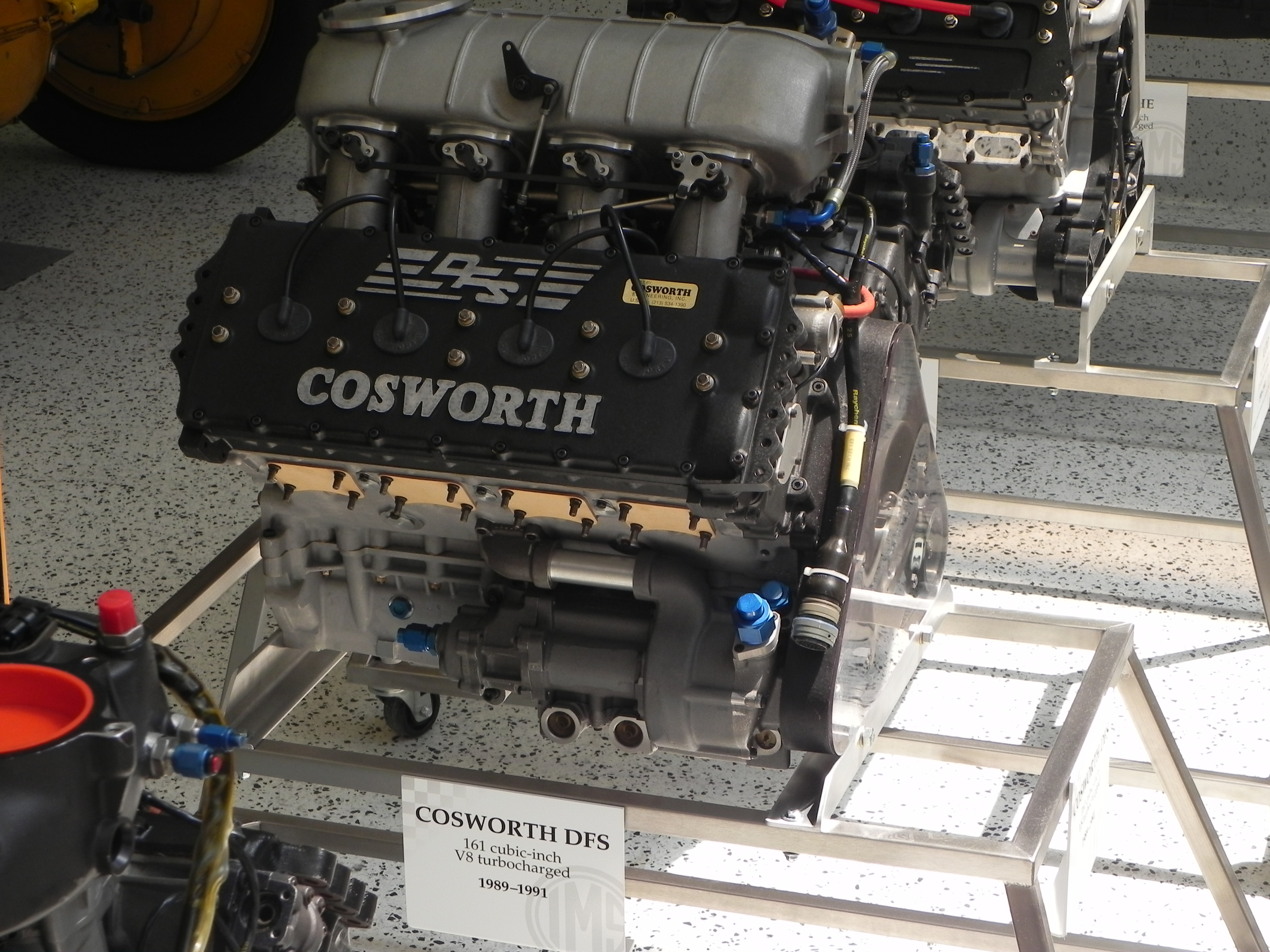
Cosworth DFS

One of the most successful and longest-lived projects of Cosworth has been its CART / Champ Car engine programme. In 1975; Cosworth developed the DFX, by destroking the engine to 2,650 cc (161.7 cu in) and adding a turbocharger, the DFX became the standard engine to run in IndyCar racing, ending the reign of the Offenhauser, and maintaining that position until the late 1980s. Ford backed Cosworth with creating a new interim design for IndyCar racing in the late 1980s, the DFS, which merged DFR technology into the ageing DFX design, but it was eventually rendered obsolete by advancing technology.

While designed as an F1 engine, the DFV was also used as in endurance racing, although its flat-plane crank design led to destructive vibrations putting stress on devices surrounding the engine, especially the exhaust system. The first sports car to use a DFV, the Ford P68, failed to finish a single race because of repeated mechanical and electrical failures. Despite this handicap the DFV won the 24 Hours of Le Mans twice in its original 3.0 Litre form for Mirage in 1975 and Rondeau in 1980, who were able to attain sufficient reliability by de-tuning the motor.

The DFL for endurance racing was developed for the 1982 season to replace the DFV. It came in two versions: one with 3,298 cc (201.3 cu in) and the other with 3,955 cc (241.3 cu in). While neither competed well in the Group C (C1 Class) the former was adapted to the C2 Class (700 kg minimum weight, 55 Litres fuel, 5 refuelings/1000 km) starting in 1984. During the latter half of the 1980s it was the most popular motor for that class, with successful championship campaigns and five class wins at the 24 Hours of Le Mans. The latter version's severe lack of reliability caused it to fall out of use by 1985.

=== The BDA series ===
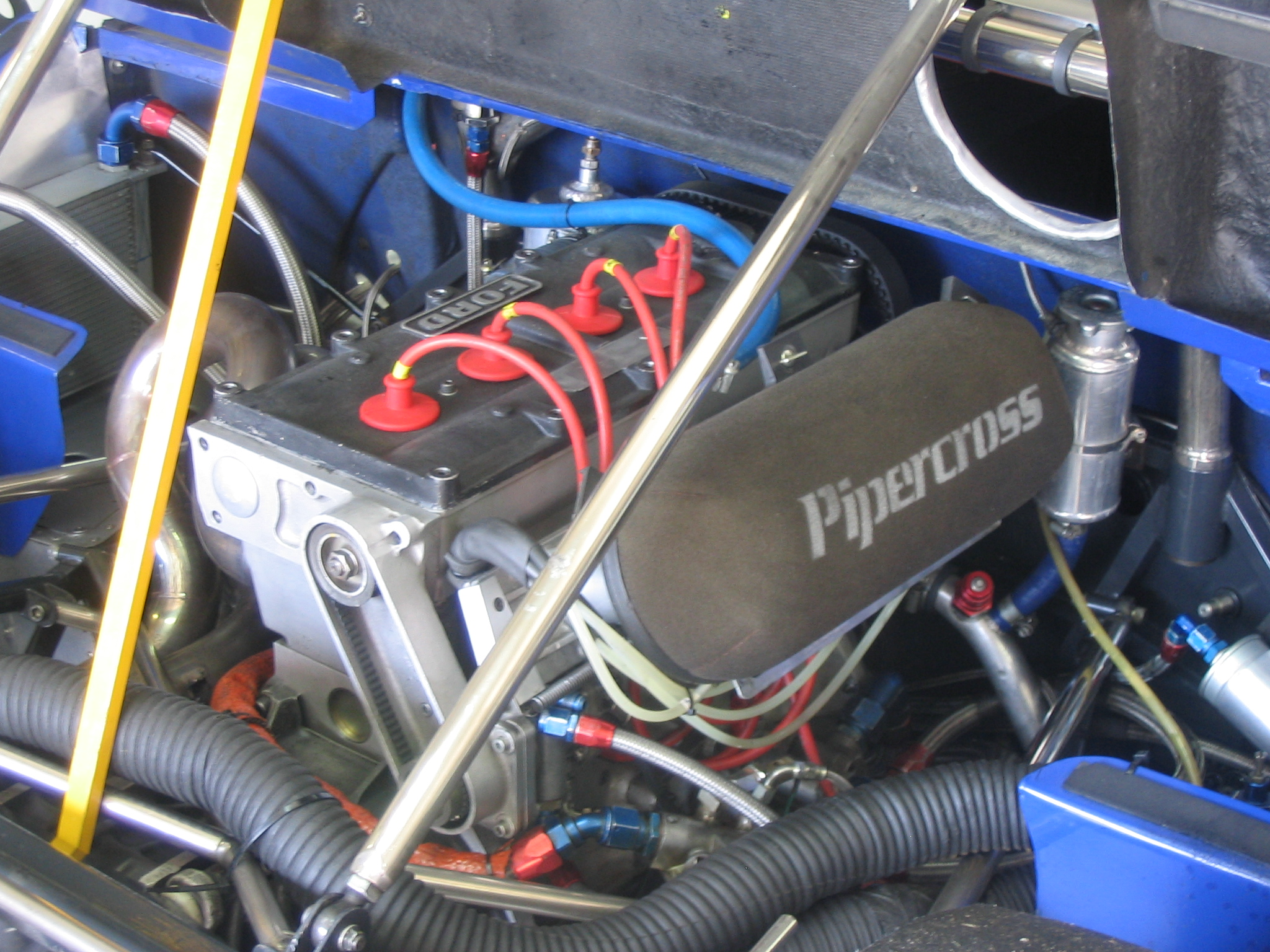
Aluminium block 2L BDG on Chevron B19

Cosworth solidified its association with Ford in 1969, by developing a double overhead camshaft (DOHC) 16-valve inline four-cylinder engine for road use in the Ford Escort. As Keith Duckworth was busy designing and developing the DFV, the project was assigned to Mike Hall, who created the 1601 cc BDA on the Ford Kent engine block for homologation purposes. The camshafts were driven by a toothed belt developed for Fiat 124, hence the name BDA, literally meaning "Belt Drive, A type". It was designed for FIA Group 2 and Group 4 on either rallying or touring car racing purpose. The nominal homologation at 1601 cc capacity meant that BDA-engined cars competed in what was usually the top class (1600 cc and up) so were eligible for overall victories rather than class wins.

In 1970, the 1701 cc BDB was created for the Escort RS1600, and this engine received fuel injection for the first time in the series as 1701 cc BDC. Two years later, the BDA series was adopted for Formula 2; first came the 1790 cc BDE, then the 1927 cc BDF eventually reaching a maximum of 1975 cc BDG in 1973. As the bore size reached ever closer to the bore centre distance, leaving little space in between cylinders, all three types had brazed-in cylinder liners to the block. As a departure from the Ford iron block, the BDG received a new aluminium block (originally designed by Brian Hart in 1971 and re-engineered by Cosworth) soon after, and this cylinder block was used as a replacement part in rebuilding many other BD series engines as well as some Mk.XIII engines.

The iron block was also used for smaller displacements; starting with the very successful 1599 cc Formula Atlantic BDD in 1970, followed by the 1098 cc BDJ and 1300 cc BDH variants for SCCA Formula C and sports car racing, respectively. There was even a one-off 785 cc version built by Cosworth employees Paul Squires and Phil Kidsley; fitted with a Lysholm supercharger it was installed in a Brabham BT28 Formula 3 chassis and competed in the British Hill Climb Championship as the Brabham-Lysholm.

In 1970, Ford asked Weslake and Co of Rye, East Sussex to build the BDD for them, and by the end of 1970, the production line was installed at Rye and production was under way. These engines were often called the 'BDA', but were 1599 cc BDDs eligible for under 1.6 Litre class. The 1599 cc BDD engine won a number of championships around the world in Formula Atlantic and Formula Pacific during the 1980s.

In 1975, 1599 cc big valve BDM (225 bhp) was developed with fuel injection for Formula Atlantic, and a 'sealed engine' version BDN (1599 cc, 210 bhp) followed in 1977 for Canadian Formula Atlantic series.

Largely known as 'Cosworth BDA' or 'Ford BDA', BDD and BDM were also very successful in Formula Pacific and Formula Mondial racing in Australia and New Zealand. In open wheel racing, Cosworth powered cars (Ralt RT4 and Tiga's) won Australian Drivers' Championship in 1982–1986 as well as winning the Australian Grand Prix in 1981–1984 (including wins by Alain Prost and Roberto Moreno) before the race became part of the Formula One World Championship in 1985, and won the New Zealand Grand Prix each year from 1982 to 1988. BDD and BDM engines were also prominent in the Australian Sports Car Championship during the 1980s, winning the 1987 championship.

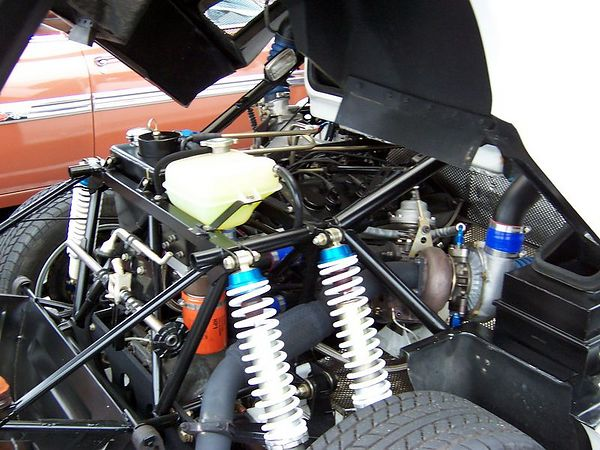
1803 cc BDT on Ford RS200 with turbocharger and wastegate valve more visible than the engine

The turbo charged 1778 cc BDT was created in 1981, which powered the never-raced RWD Escort RS1700T. In 1984, 4WD Ford RS200 debuted with a 1803 cc version of BDT, which was created for Group B rallying. Between 1984 and 1986 the BDT engine was used in Group C endurance racing by Roy Baker, in class C2 using the Tiga GC284, GC285 and GC286. Later in 1986, a 2137 cc version was created by Brian Hart using a bespoke aluminium block and a large intercooler for RS200 Evolution, just as Group B was cancelled by the FIA. This BDT-E ('E' for Evolution) produced over 600 bhp (447 kW; 608 PS) in Group B 'rallycross' boost level, normally producing 530–550 bhp (395–410 kW; 537–558 PS) on a lower but sustainable boost.

In 1983, the BD series saw its second road engine incarnation (the first being the original BDA and BDB), the BDR, which was a BDA or BDB sold in kit form for the Caterham Super Seven in 1601 cc (120 bhp) and in 1701 cc (130 bhp) formats.

The Hart 415T and the Zakspeed 1500/4 F1 engines owe much to the BDA series, being essentially an aluminium-block derivative using similar heads.

=== The GA/GAA V6 ===
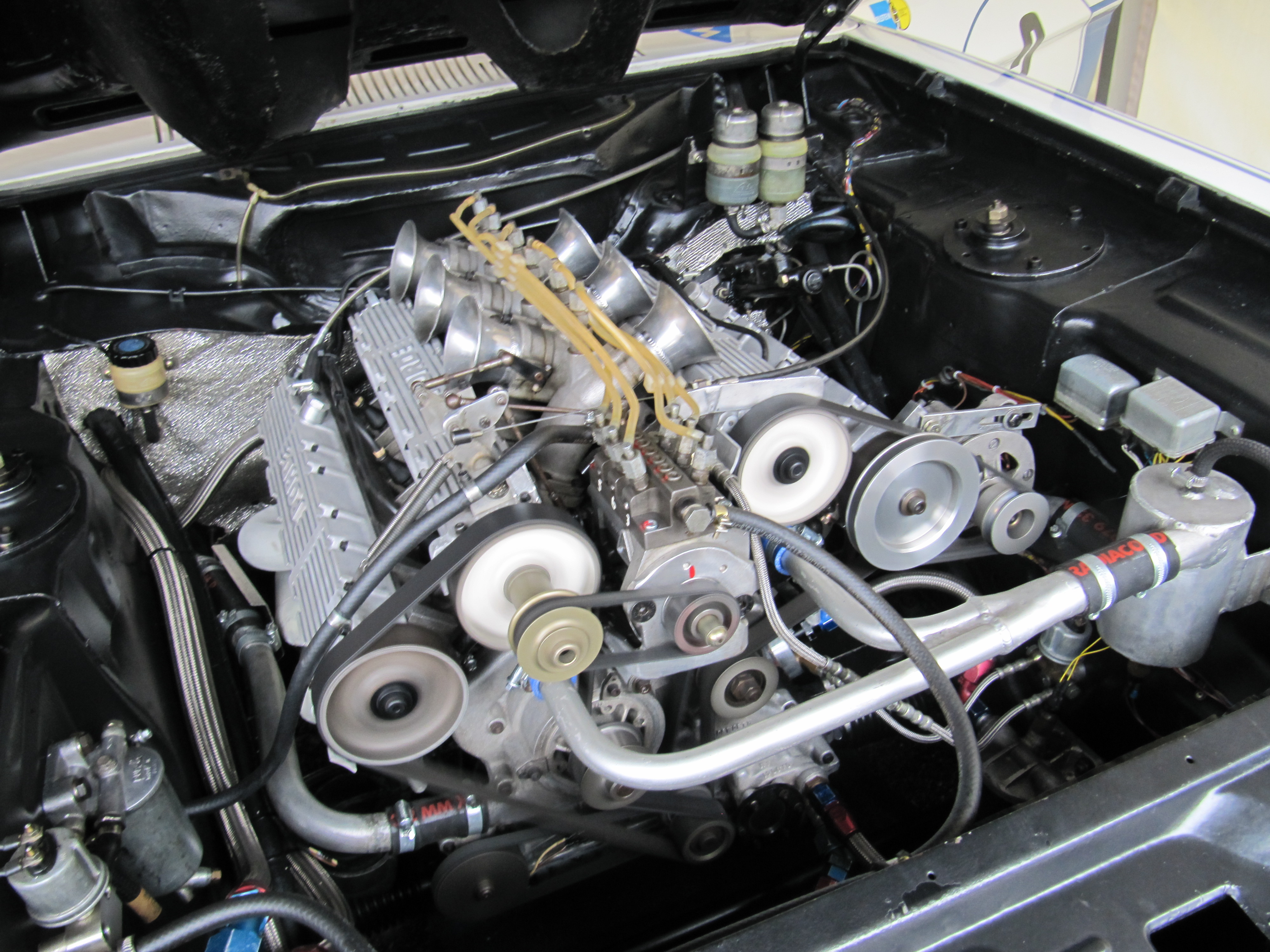
The GA V6 in 1974 Ford Capri DRM

A fuel-injected belt-driven DOHC GA (also called the GAA) was based on the 60 degree V6 block of Ford Essex, and was used for the Ford Capris raced in Group 2 in the early 1970s. This had a capacity of 3,412 cc (208.2 cu in), and was highly competitive against the BMW straight-sixes. The GA was also used in the later years of Formula 5000 in Europe.

The GA or GAA was commissioned by Ford in May 1972, when Ford realised that the Cologne V6 based Weslake OHV V6 engines used in their Capris which competed in the European Touring Car Championship had been modified to the point that no more performance could be extracted from them. Mike Hall, who had already designed the highly successful Cosworth DFV and BDA engines, took on the task of developing a whole new engine based on the 3-Litre Essex V6 block.

The new engine was radically different from the previously used Weslake unit in that it featured twin overhead camshaft aluminium alloy cylinder heads, 4 valves per cylinder, a Lucas mechanical fuel injection system, dry sump oiling system, a steel crankshaft, and enlarged displacement of 3412cc, compared with the 2.9 litres of the previously used Cologne V6 based Weslake V6.

Ford expected a minimum of 400 Hp from the new Cosworth engine; that figure was exceeded, with the engine producing 420 Hp in the first test run. In race tune they finally produced around 462 bhp (345 kW; 468 PS) at 9000 rpm and 300 ft-lb of torque (407 Nm). This meant that the new engine proved highly successful at competing against BMW in the 1973 Season of the European Touring Car Championship where the engine was installed in Ford's newly homologated Capri RS 3100.

Ford Motorsport also sold 100 Cosworth GA V6 engines, most of them ending up in Formula 5000 cars.

The GA/GAA V6 is a very rare, and extremely expensive engine, with rebuilt units priced at £50,000.

=== The FBA and FBC V6 ===
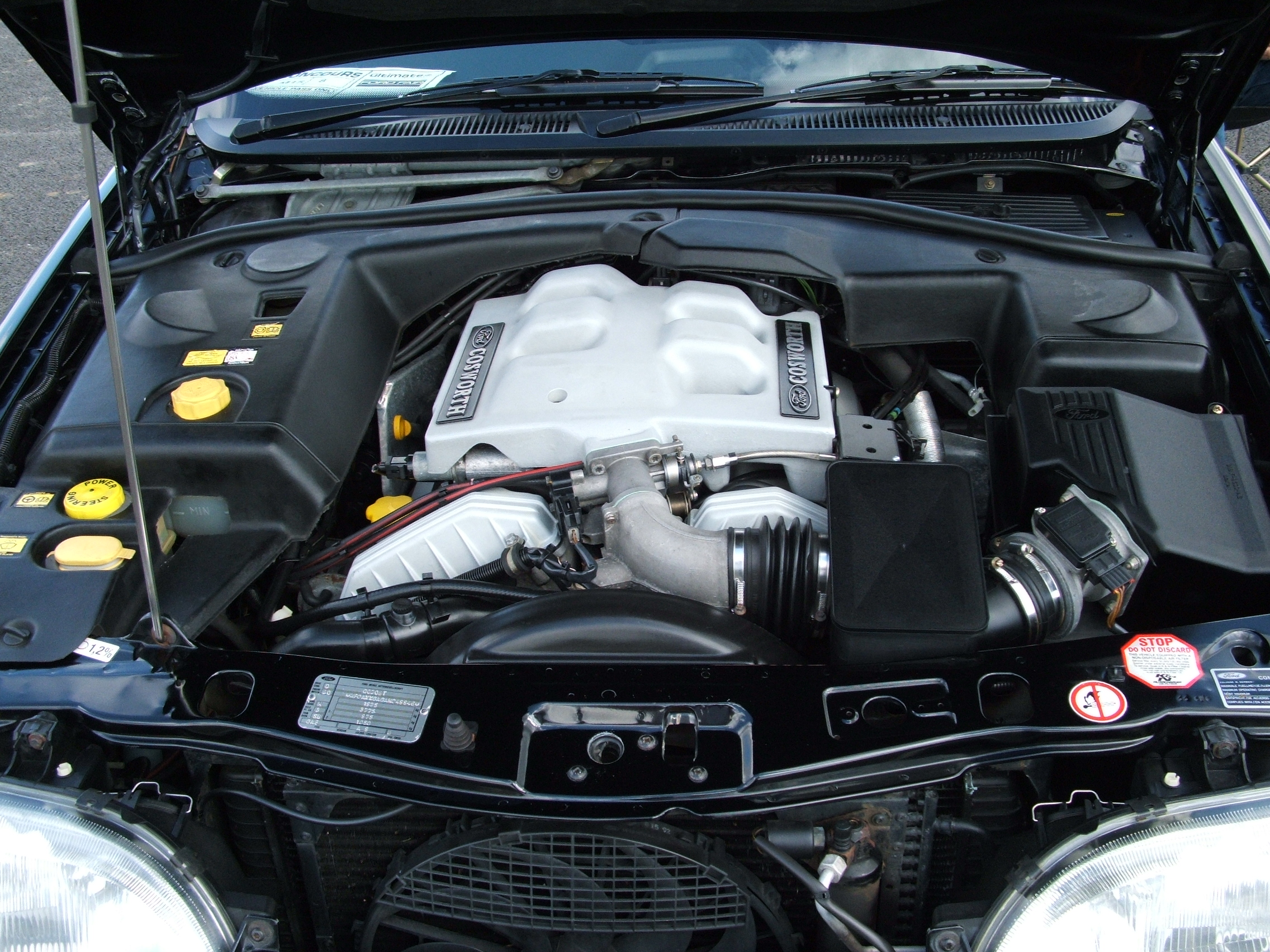
The FBA V6 in a MkIII Granada Scorpio 24v

The FBA and FBC engines were found in the Ford Granada and Ford Scorpio. The FBA came first in 1991 and was also known as the 'BOA'; it was based on the Ford Cologne V6 used in the Ford Sierra and Ford Capri and other models and was a twin overhead camshaft 24valve conversion for more power, producing 195 metric horsepower (143 kW; 192 bhp) and better idle quality.

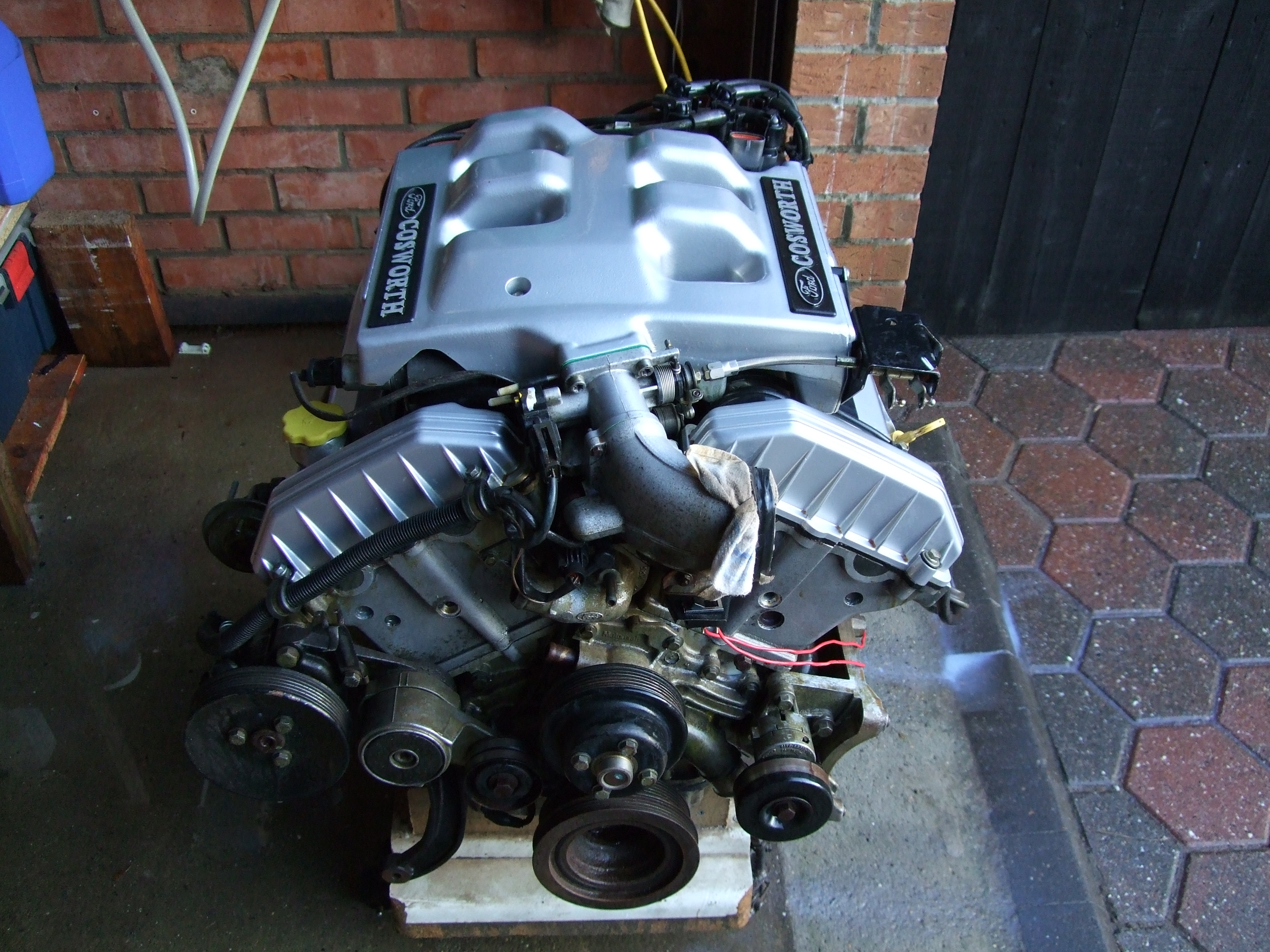
Cosworth FBA

In 1995, with a new version of the Scorpio, it was upgraded with a wider torque spread and higher power – to 204 PS (150 kW; 201 hp), from a variable intake system and reprofiled cams. The NVH was improved with a change from a single chain to drive all four camshafts – to one chain to drive one bank of cams and a second for the other bank; this engine was known as the 'BOB'.

A racing version was also available for a short time – FBE – with an individual throttle butterfly for each cylinder.

FBB and FBD engines existed as development engines but these were never released.

The two production engines were always mated to an automatic gearbox but have become popular in the custom car scene where they have been mated to the 4x4 manual transmission and the rear-wheel-drive manual transmission from the Ford Sierra XR4 and XR4x4. There are also companies that offer twin and single turbo conversions, and other modifications to increase power to usually around 400 bhp (300 kW). These engines can be bought relatively cheaply and, providing they are well serviced, engines have been known to cover over 200,000 miles without major work being required.

=== The YB series ===
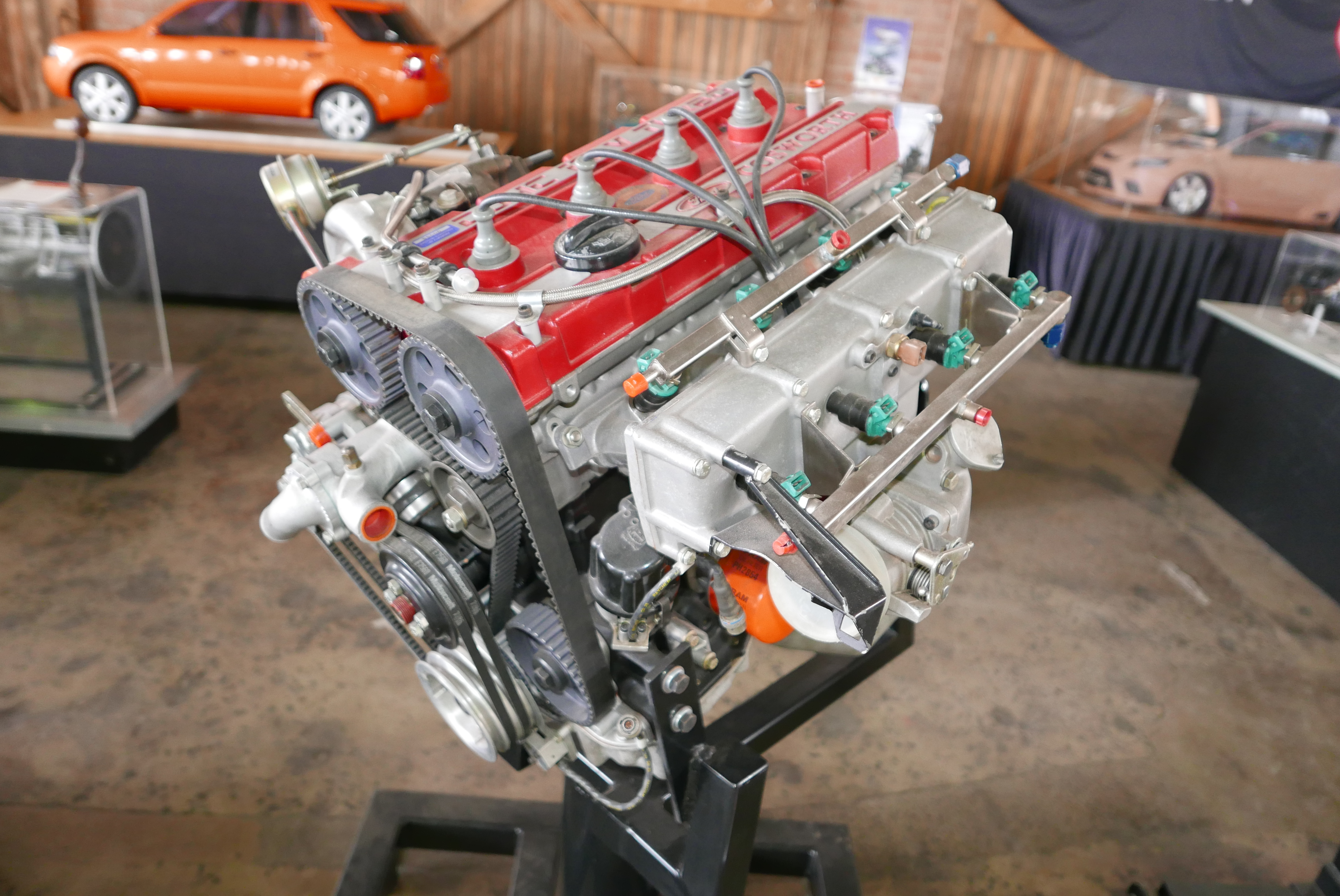
YB engine

The YB series of 1,993 cc (121.6 cu in) engines are based on the older inline four Ford T88 engine block, and were introduced in the road-going Ford Sierra RS Cosworth in 1986 with 204 PS (150 kW; 201 bhp). With 5,000 units built for homologation purposes in Group A, both for rallies and touring cars. Racing versions of the RS Cosworth were developing around 370 hp (276 kW; 375 PS), but with the small Garrett T3 turbo on the cars reliability was a problem. A limited edition evolution model was introduced in mid-1987 (once the base of 5,000 cars had been built, only 500 "evo" or upgraded versions were needed for Group A homologation), the Sierra RS500 which included a bigger T4 turbo, with power initially at around the 470 hp (350 kW; 477 PS) mark in 1987, but in later years climbing to close to some 550 hp (410 kW; 558 PS) in full racing trim.

The RS500 came to dominate touring car racing in its heyday from 1987 to 1992, winning multiple championships and major races.

Championship wins

- World Touring Car Championship – 1987 (Entrants title)
- Japanese Touring Car Championship – 1987, 1988, 1989 (1989 Entrants title)
- Australian Manufacturers' Championship - 1988 (co-winners with BMW and Toyota), 1990
- Australian Touring Car Championship – 1988, 1989
- European Touring Car Championship – 1988 (Entrants title)
- Deutsche Tourenwagen Meisterschaft – 1988
- AMSCAR series – 1988, 1989, 1990
- Nissan Mobil 500 Series – 1989, 1990
- New Zealand Touring Car Championship – 1989, 1990, 1992
- British Touring Car Championship – 1990
- Australian Endurance Championship – 1990

Major race wins

- Wellington 500 – 1987
- Fuji InterTEC 500 – 1987, 1988, 1989
- RAC Tourist Trophy – 1988
- Sandown 500 – 1988, 1990
- Bathurst 1000 – 1988, 1989
- Pukekohe 500 – 1988, 1989, 1990
- Spa 24 Hours – 1989
- Guia Race of Macau – 1989

The only car to truly challenge the Sierra's power dominance towards the end of the Group A era in 1990–1992 was the 640 hp (477 kW; 649 PS), 4WD twin turbo Nissan Skyline R32 GT-R.

At the end of its life in Group A in 1992, the Australian Sierra teams were reportedly getting around 600 bhp (447 kW; 608 PS) from the 2.0L turbocharged YB engines. For his pole position lap at the 1992 Bathurst 1000, Australian driver Dick Johnson, whose team since 1988 had a reputation for having the fastest Sierras in Group A racing anywhere in the world, was reportedly running a special qualifying engine and F1-level fuel supplied by the team's major sponsor Shell (consisting of a mix of toluene and methanol). His YBD engine for the Top 10 Runoff at Bathurst was rumoured to be producing up to 680 hp (507 kW; 689 PS).

The various colour cam covers that distinguished each version were as follows:

- Red: YBB (Sierra Cosworth 2wd, both 3-door and Sapphire), YBD (Sierra RS500), YBJ (Sierra Sapphire 4wd, non cat)
- Green: YBG (catalyst equipped 4x4 Sierra Sapphire Cosworth)
- Blue: YBT (large-turbo Escort Cosworth)
- Silver: YBP (small-turbo Escort Cosworth).

Further evolutions of the YB included a reduced-emissions road version, as well as the block used in the Escort RS Cosworth (which used the Sierra floorpan). The engine stopped being used on new cars in 1997, with the Focus WRC and road-going Focus RS instead relying on Zetec designs.

=== The GBA V6 ===
Cosworth experimented with turbocharged BD derivatives, before settling on an all-new turbocharged 1,500 cc (91.5 cu in) V6 engine to be badged as the Ford TEC (internally it was known as the GB-series). This had a long development history dating back to the 1984 British Grand Prix at Brands Hatch where Cosworth and Ford's competition department agreed to build a new turbo engine to replace the outdated DFV / DFY series. The TEC raced only briefly, in 1986, with the Haas Lola team and in 1987 with the Benetton team. The development of the GBA engine at Cosworth became the subject of a British TV documentary in Channel Four's Equinox series, broadcast in 1986.

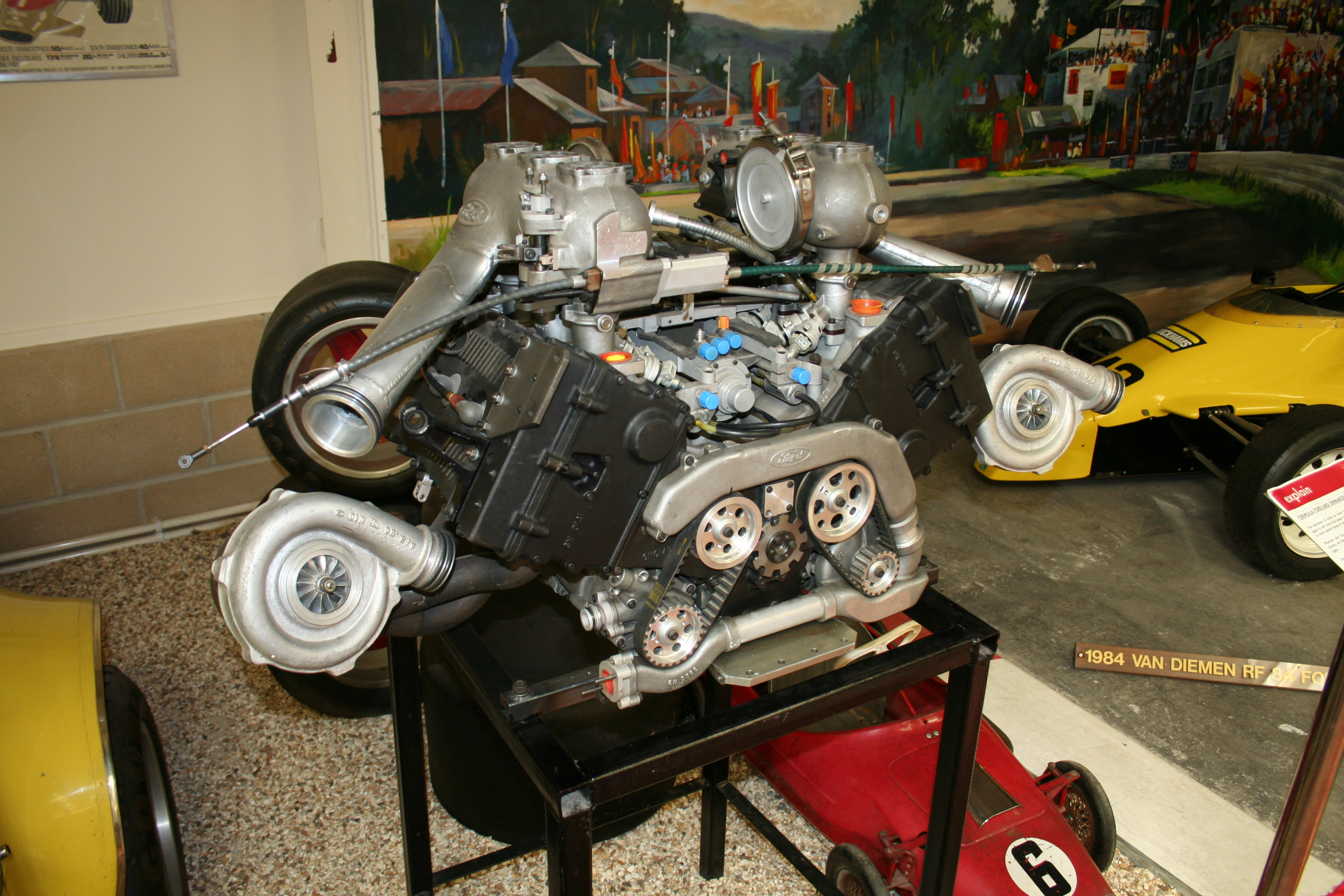
Cosworth GBA

The GBA was designed by Keith Duckworth and Geoff Goddard, though many in Formula One doubted Duckworth's ability to design another truly competitive engine due to his known distaste for turbocharging in general. Rather than design an entirely new engine, Duckworth instead chose to originally try and develop an old, modified 4-cylinder BDA sports car engine as he believed 4-cylinder engines were more compact and economical than a V6 (Cosworth's chief race engine designer Geoff Goddard was against the idea of the straight 4, but reluctantly let Duckworth go down that path). However, after numerous failures of the test engines on the dynamometer which were eventually traced to an incurable vibration at the crankshaft, Duckworth and Goddard designed an all new 120° V6 engine instead, the same configuration as the Ferrari V6 turbo engine used from 1981 to 1986. The BDA engine was originally limited to 10,000 RPM in sports car racing, but with a turbo its failures generally happened at around 11,000 RPM. The first 4-cylinder test engine was so badly damaged that it actually changed the shape of the engine block to the point where the crankshaft would not move- the engine was simply not designed to be turbocharged. As around four months had been lost in trying to get the 4-cylinder engine to work, Ford and Cosworth's plan for the engine to debut with Haas Lola in 1985 was pushed back to the 1986 season.

The GBA engine was first road tested by Haas Lola's lead driver, 1980 World Champion Alan Jones in the new Lola THL2 at the Boreham Circuit in Essex just north-east of London on 21 February 1986. In freezing, snowy conditions (−6° Celsius) at approximately 10 AM, the V6 turbo, running a conservative 2.5 BAR boost setting, ran cleanly although the engine management electronics developed by Motorola in the United States and Cosworth had not yet been finalised and the engine ran with the same electronics that were used on the dynamometer. Also present at the test were Duckworth, Goddard, the THL2's designer Neil Oatley, the teams #2 driver Patrick Tambay and other staff from both Haas Lola, Ford and Cosworth.

The engine made its Formula One debut with Jones driving the Lola THL2 at the 1986 San Marino Grand Prix, the third round of the 1986 season (for the opening two races in Brazil and Spain, the team used their 1985 car, the Hart 415-T turbo powered Lola THL1, while Tambay also drove the THL1 at Imola). Jones qualified in 21st place and retired after 28 of the races 60 laps due to overheating. Jones also recorded the engine's first finish when he placed 11th in the Belgian Grand Prix. Jones and teammate Patrick Tambay captured the Ford V6 turbo's first ever points when they finished 4th and 5th respectively in the Austrian Grand Prix, with Jones backing up in the next race in Italy with a 6th-placed finish, the final points the engine would gain in 1986.

Producing approximately 900 bhp (671 kW; 912 PS), the turbocharged V6 is the most powerful Formula One engine designed and built by Cosworth. With Haas Lola not competing in 1987, Benetton, having lost the use of the 4-cylinder BMW engines when the German giant pulled out of Formula One, signed with Ford to race their V6 for the season. While in 1986 turbo boost had been unrestricted by the rules, 1987 saw the FIA introduce the pop-off valve to the turbocharged engines in a two-year plan to outlaw the turbos and make all Formula One engines 3.5 litres and naturally aspirated by the start of the 1989 season. While Cosworth adapted the TEC to 1987's 4.0 Bar turbo limit and the new 195 litre fuel limit, development of the V6 turbo engine which would be obsolete in less than two years virtually stopped. Cosworth instead worked on the DFR V8 that was introduced with Benetton in 1988.

With the reduction in turbo boost limit not affecting the Ford V6 as much as others such as Honda, BMW and Ferrari which had more horsepower to lose, the turbo engine would be more competitive with Benetton in 1987, with Teo Fabi taking the engine's first podium with third in Austria, followed by its last podium when Thierry Boutsen also scored third in the last race of the season in Australia.

=== The HB V8 ===
The replacement for the DFV/DFZ/DFR series was the HB series designed by Geoff Goddard as a 3,498 cc (213.5 cu in) (96 mm x 60.4 mm) V8, introduced with the Benetton team midway through 1989, making its debut at the French Grand Prix. It won the Japanese Grand Prix that year (Benetton used both the original HBA1 and the development HBA4 in 1989).

As Ford's de facto works team, Benetton maintained exclusivity with this model through the rest of 1989 and 1990. 1991 saw the introduction of customer units, two specifications behind their works equivalents. In 1991, these were supplied to the fledgling Jordan Grand Prix outfit, and for 1992, Lotus. 1993 saw the customer deal extended to McLaren who had lost the use of their Honda V12 engines after 1992. Using the customer HBA7 (and later a customer HBA8), McLaren won five Grands Prix with triple World Champion Ayrton Senna that year.

The HBA1 V8 was introduced in 1989. It exploited a narrower 75° vee-angle rather than the 90° used in the DFV series, and was originally rated at approximately 630 bhp (470 kW; 639 PS). By 1993, the factory HBA8 V8 engine used by Benetton was producing approximately 700 bhp (522 kW; 710 PS) at 13,000 rpm. Although the HB V8 was less powerful than the V10s and V12s used by rivals Renault, Honda, and Ferrari, its advantage was that it was lighter and gave better fuel economy.

A Jaguar-badged version of the HB was developed by Tom Walkinshaw Racing to the tune of 650 bhp at 11,500 rpm for sports car racing, fitted to the extremely successful Jaguar XJR-14.

=== The EC, ECA, ED, EDM and ED 2/4 V8 ===
The HB was developed into the 3,498 cc (213.5 cu in) (100 mm x 55.7 mm) EC V8 for the 1994 season. This engine, producing about 740 bhp at 14,500rpm, was badged as Ford Zetec-R, and Michael Schumacher won the Drivers' World Championship with Benetton (his first of a record 7 championships), in 1994. This was the last Ford-powered F1 title.

For the 1995 season, the F1 engine regulation changed to 3 litres, and the EC's bore and stroke were changed to 94mm x 53.9mm, resulting in 2,992 cc (182.6 cu in) ECA, which was introduced at about 600 bhp, and developed to 610 to 630 bhp at 14,000rpm. It was exclusively used by the Sauber team, whose biggest success of the year was Heinz-Harald Frentzen's third place at Monza.

Customer unit Cosworth ED (not badged as Ford Zetec-R) for non-works teams was also made for 1995 with about 580 bhp for Simtek (called the EDB), Pacific Racing (EDC) and Forti (EDD) teams. Minardi continued with Magneti Marelli engine management as per their HB in 1994, this version having the Cosworth designation EDM. At the first test with the EDM, Luca Badoer reported that this engine felt less powerful then the 3 litre 9000rpm rev limited engine he had used to win the F3000 championship in 1992. Cosworth later updated the ED to ED 2/4 for Tyrrell with 2,995 cc (182.8 cu in) (94mm x 53.95mm) displacement for 600 bhp, which was used until the end of 1997 season. The ill-fated Mastercard Lola team initially entered in 1997 using the Ford ECA engine used by Sauber in 1995 and Forti in 1996. However the team withdrew from the championship before the second round of the season in Brazil, having failed to comfortably failed to qualify for the first race in Australia.

=== The JD, VJ and VJM V10 ===
In order to produce a higher power at higher rpm, a completely new 2,992 cc (182.6 cu in) (89mm x 48.1mm) JD 72° V10 was designed for 1996, which produced about 670 bhp at 15,800 rpm, and used by Sauber Formula One team. This engine was further developed into VJ and VJM with the same V-angle, bore and stroke, reaching 720 bhp for racing, and 730 bhp for qualifying, at 16,500 rpm. All three of these engines were badged as Ford Zetec-R as well, and used by several teams. In its debut season, the best result was another third place, this time taken by Johnny Herbert at Monaco. This was surpassed one year later by Rubens Barichello's sensational second place, again at Monaco, which was the first points finish for the newly formed Stewart Grand Prix team.

=== Further Formula One engines ===
The Stewart Grand Prix team effectively became the Ford works team, and used Cosworth CR-1 engines from its first season in 1997, which was a much lighter version of VJM, ultimately reaching 770 bhp at 16,500 rpm by 2001. Over the next few years Ford had increased its involvement with the Stewart team, and finally bought the team, renaming it Jaguar Racing for 2000. Ford pulled out of F1 at the end of 2004, but the team (bought by and renamed Red Bull Racing) continued to use Cosworth V10 engines until switching to a Ferrari V8 for 2006. Minardi also used re-badged Cosworth engines until 2005.

Williams began testing the new CA2006 2.4-litre V8 in November 2005, which produced about 755 bhp at 19,250 rpm (314.7 hp/L), and began using Cosworth V8 engines for the 2006 season. In the same year, Scuderia Toro Rosso used detuned V10 engines based on the 2005 units.

In 2007, however, the company was left without a partner when Williams chose to switch to Toyota power, and Scuderia Toro Rosso made the switch to Ferrari engines (as used in 2006 by their mother team Red Bull Racing).

In Max Mosley's letter following the withdrawal of Honda from Formula One in December 2008, it was announced that Cosworth had won the tender to provide a standard engine to any interested participants. The new engine would become the standard design and manufacturers could opt to use whole units, construct their own from designs provided by Cosworth, or produce their own engine with the caveat that it be limited to the same power as the new "standard" engine.

In 2010 Cosworth returned as the engine supplier for Williams and three new teams; Hispania Racing, Lotus Racing and Virgin Racing. The CA2010 is the same 2.4-litre V8 base of the CA2006 used by Williams, but has been re-tuned for the then-mandated 18,000 rpm limit required on all engines, down from its original 20,000 rpm implementation. First units were ready and shipped to teams in mid-January for fitting 2 weeks prior to first track testing for the year.

=== Other IndyCar and Champ Car engines ===
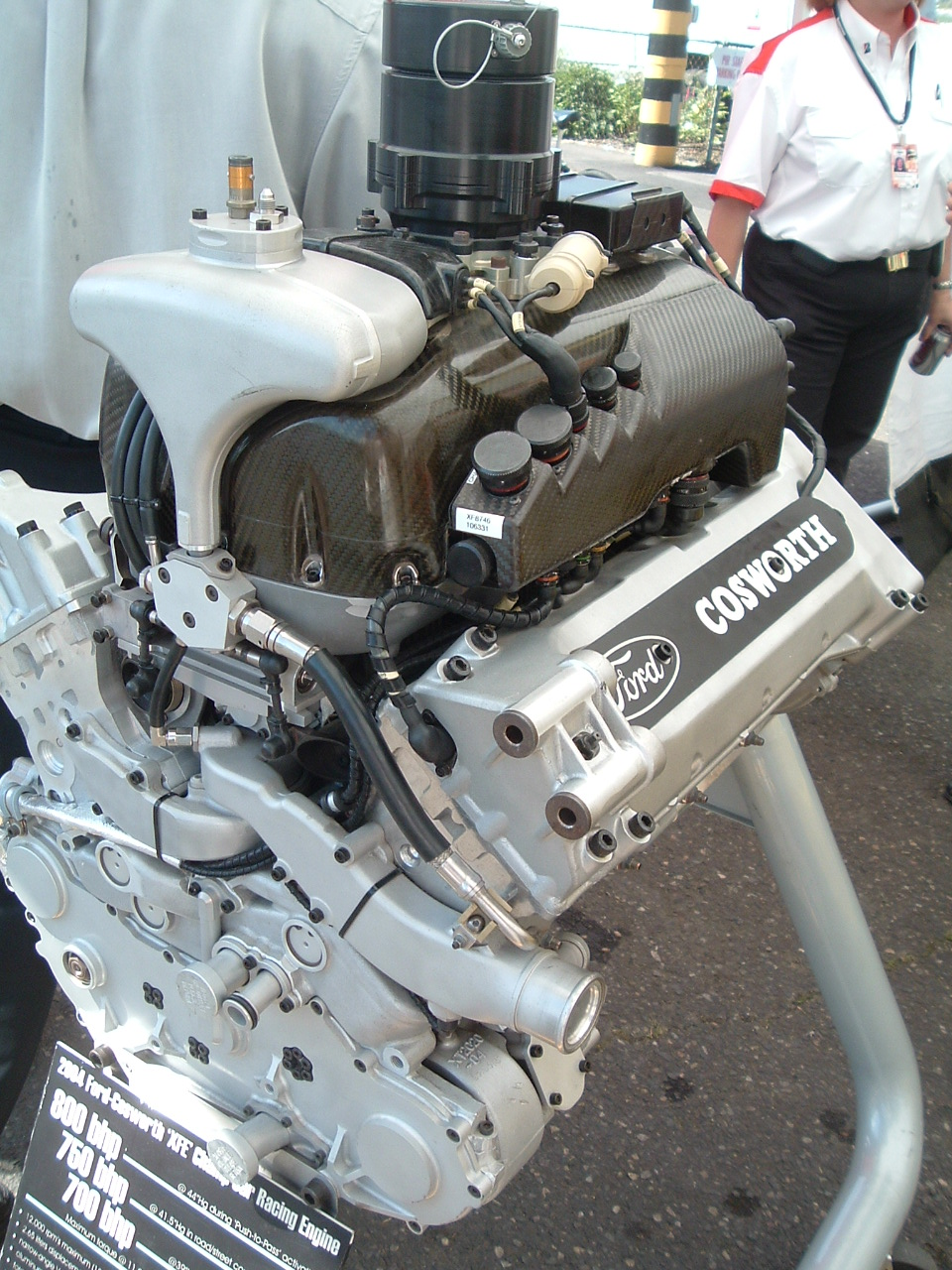
A 2004 Champ Car display engine

Cosworth designed a series of replacements for the DFS to be used in IndyCar and Champ Car racing: the X-series, beginning in 1992 with the XB. The XF was developed for the 2000 season to replace the XD, and was chosen as the spec engine for the Champ Car World Series in 2003. The most recent derivative of the XF, the 2,650 cubic centimetres (161.7 cu in) XFE quad-cam 90° V8 overhead camshaft, continued in that role through the 2007 season. The Champ Car World Series imposed a rev limit of 12,000 rpm down from the over 15,000 rpm of 2002. The 2004 model of the XFE had a rated power of nominal 750 horsepower (559 kW; 760 PS) at 1,054 mmHg (intake boost pressure), and a maximum power of 800 bhp (597 kW; 811 PS) at 1130 mmHg (during Push-to-Pass). The 2004 XFE maximum speed was 12,000 rpm (rev limited) and torque of 490 N⋅m (361 lbf⋅ft). The aluminium and iron turbo housing ran a boost of 5.9 psi at sea level (= boost of 12 inches of mercury which is 41.5 inches of mercury absolute). The Methanol-fuelled engine used a steel crankshaft and aluminium alloy pistons. Weight was 120 kg (264.6 lb) and length was 539 mm (21.2 in).

In 2007, the Ford name was removed from the engine as the manufacturer elected not to continue sponsorship of the series. Several other engine changes were made, notably the removal of the calibrated "pop off valve" designed to limit turbo boost pressure, replaced by engine electronics. The rated life of the engine was 1,400 miles (2,300 km) between rebuilds. Engines were sent by the race teams to Cosworth for the rebuild. In 2007, Champ Car switched to the new Panoz DP01 chassis, which was said to provide better ducting of airflow into the engine. The Champ Car World Series merged into the Indy Racing League IndyCar Series prior to the 2008 season, and Cosworth does not currently provide engines to any American open wheel racing series.

In mid-2003, Cosworth provided the 3.5 L V8 XG badged as a Chevrolet Gen 4 engine to IRL IndyCar Series teams after the proprietary Chevrolet Gen 3 engine proved inadequate against rival Hondas and Toyotas during the 2003 season. While many teams left Chevrolet after the 2003 season, those that stayed saw a significant improvement in performance with the new "Chevworth" engine compared to their previous units. The XG finished second in its first race at Michigan on July 27, 2003. Sam Hornish Jr. went on to win 3 races that season with the new XG. The XG was reduced in size to 3 L for 2004 season and it won one race in 2005 during Chevrolet's final season in IRL.

=== Other Formula Atlantic engines ===
Currently these are 300 horsepower (224 kW; 304 PS) 2,300 cubic centimetres (140.4 cu in) straight-four engines based on the Mazda MZR engine developed in cooperation with Mazda. Changes includes a billet crankshaft, barrel throttle bodies, new cylinder head with larger valves, pistons, con rods and camshafts. A detuned 250 horsepower (190 kW; 250 PS) version, targeting club racers, is sold to the consumer market. This engine retains the standard crankshaft, and has a different cylinder head. Both engines are built by Cosworth in Torrance, California, under the guidance of newly appointed technical designer Wayne Merry (formerly of Cosworth in Worcester UK).

=== Other road engines ===
Best known in Europe for its relationship with Ford – in particular because of the Cosworth name in the vehicle title on the high-performance Ford Sierra RS Cosworth and Ford Escort RS Cosworth, but also in the creation of other Ford models; the Escort RS1600, Escort RS1800, RS200, and Scorpio 2.9i 24V.

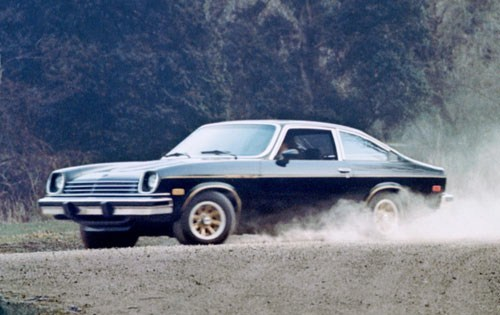
1976 Chevrolet Cosworth Vega

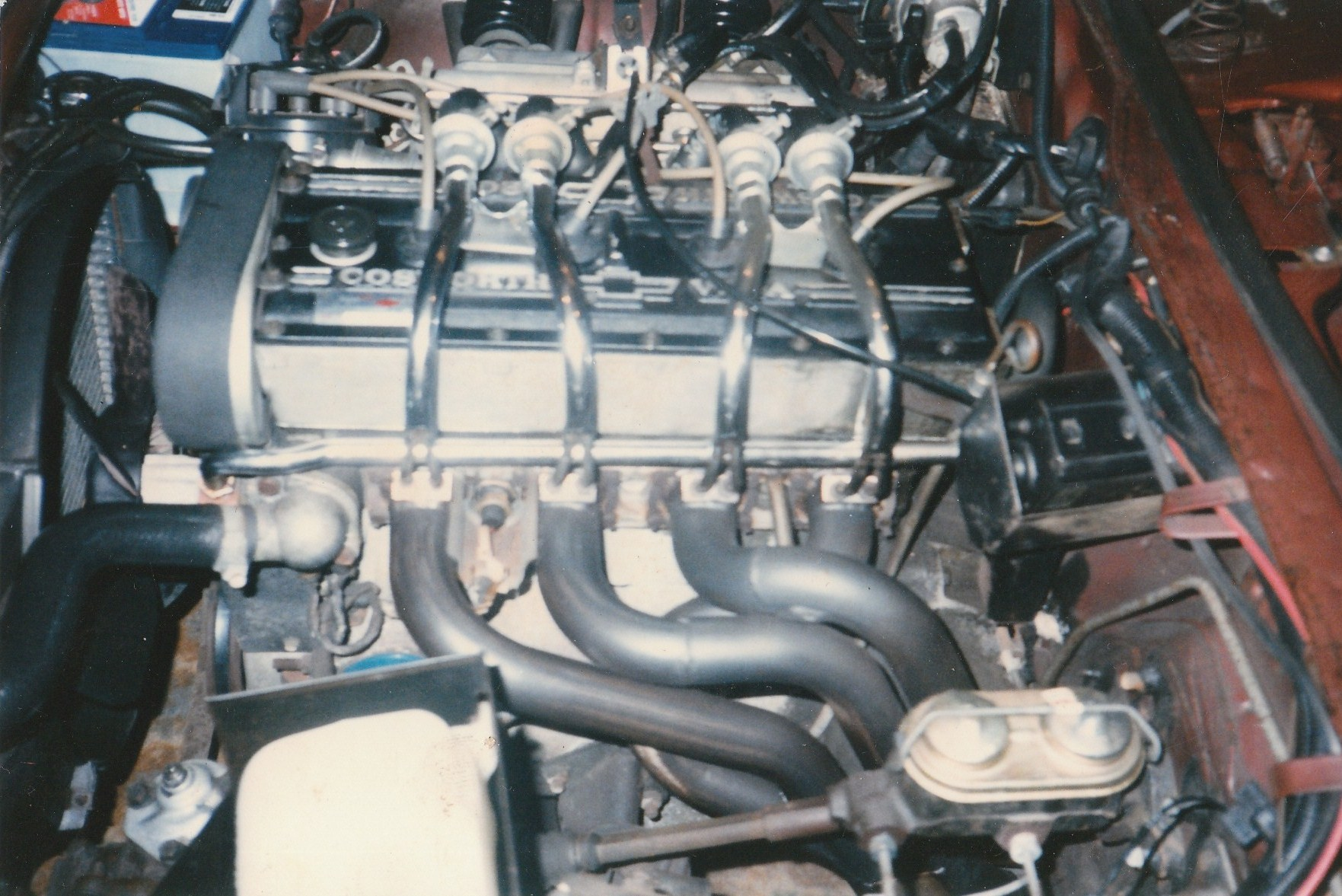
Cosworth Vega 122 cu in DOHC L4-110 hp

In the US, the name has also appeared in the title of a road car (well before it did in Europe) as the Cosworth version of the Chevrolet Vega. Only 3,508 1975 and 1976 Cosworth Vegas were produced from March 1975 through 1976. The engine features the Vega sleeveless, aluminium-alloy block fitted with forged components. The twin-cam, 16-valve, aluminium cylinder head design was assisted by Cosworth, but Chevrolet did the development work. The engine features electronic ignition, Bendix electronic fuel injection, and stainless steel headers. The final US emissions standardised version produces 110 bhp. Cosworth's EA racing version was not successful due to engine block structural failures. Chevrolet later produced a heavy-duty 'off-road' block with thicker walls to better withstand the racing application, but by that time Cosworth had moved on. Projected first year sales of the Cosworth Vega had been 5,000. With only 3,508 cars produced and many unsold, the car was discontinued. 1,500 hand-built Cosworth Vega engines were simply scrapped for lack of demand.

Other published projects for Adam Opel AG include the Opel Ascona 400 / Manta 400 rally cars and the 2.0L 16V engines in the Opel Kadett, Opel Astra GSi, Opel Vectra and Opel Calibra turbo.

Other companies known to have benefitted from the Cosworth engineering input are Mercedes-Benz (with the 190 E 2.3-16) and Audi (notably their RS cars).

Cosworth's involvement with Mercedes-Benz came with moves in the mid-1980s from the German manufacturer to re-enter motorsport after retiring from direct factory participation after the 1955 Le Mans crash which killed 80 spectators. Mercedes-Benz was looking to create a Group B rally car out of its new W201 Chassis (190E Model) and turned to the expertise of Cosworth to shorten the development time for this project.

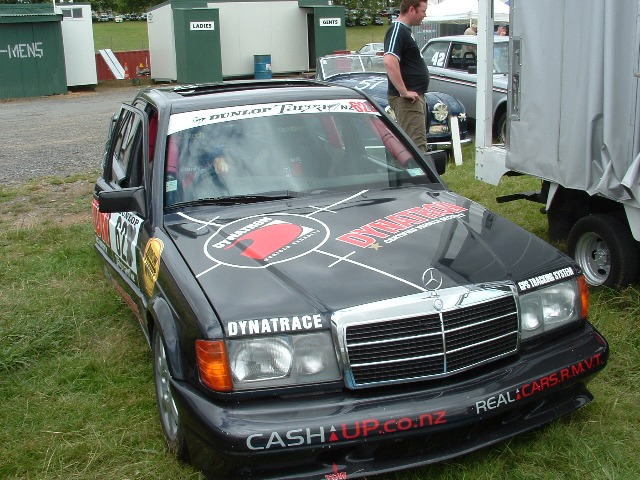
2.3-16 Targa Car

The request was a huge surprise for Cosworth, and the original brief for a 320 bhp engine based on the 136 bhp Mercedes M102 2.3-litre SOHC 4-cylinder engine was duly passed to Mike Hall, who "drew the famed DFV and BDA engine". Designed around the existing M102 head bolt pattern, the new twin cam, 16-valve, pentroof head, had its valves set at 45° included angle, rather than the 40° angle of the BDA. The valves were the biggest that could be fitted into the combustion chamber. Flat top pistons delivered the 10.5:1 compression ratio. The new Cosworth WAA engine also was Cosworth's first one-piece head, i.e. the camshaft carrier was cast integral with the head itself. Again the constraints of the existing head-bolt pattern meant that Hall had to shift the camshaft bearings from outside each pair of cam lobes as in the BDA to in between each cylinder's pair of cam lobes. The upside being that this configuration made for less flex at high rpm.

The advent of the AWD turbo Audi Quattro gave the rear-wheel-drive, normally aspirated 190E rally car no chance of being successful and the competition car was stillborn. Instead Mercedes-Benz decided to recoup its development cost by selling the car as a road going sports-sedan. Hall detuned the WAA race engine to 185 bhp by reducing the port diameters and a more restrictive fuel injection and induction was substituted for the race items to complete the detune. All WAA 2.3-16 engines were built in the Cosworth factory with the heads being produced by the Coscast method.

Cosworth assisted with the later 2.5-16 engine (WAB), and the short-stroke 2.5-16 Evo engines (WAC) although these were all manufactured in house by Mercedes-Benz. The 190E 2.3-16 became the basis for privateer Mercedes entries into the DTM from 1988. The short-stroke 2.5-16 190E EVO II was race-developed to 375+ bhp, gaining the 1992 DTM crown with Klaus Ludwig at the wheel.

A 4,300 cc (262.4 cu in) V10 designated WDA was also built and tested in a Volvo S80 in 1997, but this did not see production.

In 2017, Cosworth established an engineering partnership with Aston Martin on one of the world's most powerful hybrid electric road car engines for the Aston Martin Valkyrie. Their naturally-aspirated 6.5-litre V12 engine develops 1,000 hp (746 kW; 1,014 PS) at 10,500 rpm, and 740 N⋅m (546 lbf⋅ft) of torque at 7,000 rpm, claiming a new standard for maximum rpm and weight

In 2020, Gordon Murray Automotive commissioned Cosworth to design and build a 3,994 cc (243.7 cu in) V12 for use in their new T.50 sports car, which produces 663 PS (488 kW; 654 hp) at 11,500 rpm, and 467 N⋅m (344 lbf⋅ft) of torque at 9,000 rpm.

Cosworth was chosen by Bugatti to develop a V16 engine as part of the hybrid powertrain for the Tourbillon. The engine is reported to produce 1,000 PS (735 kW; 986 hp) and 900 N⋅m (664 lb⋅ft).

== Cosworth F1 car ==
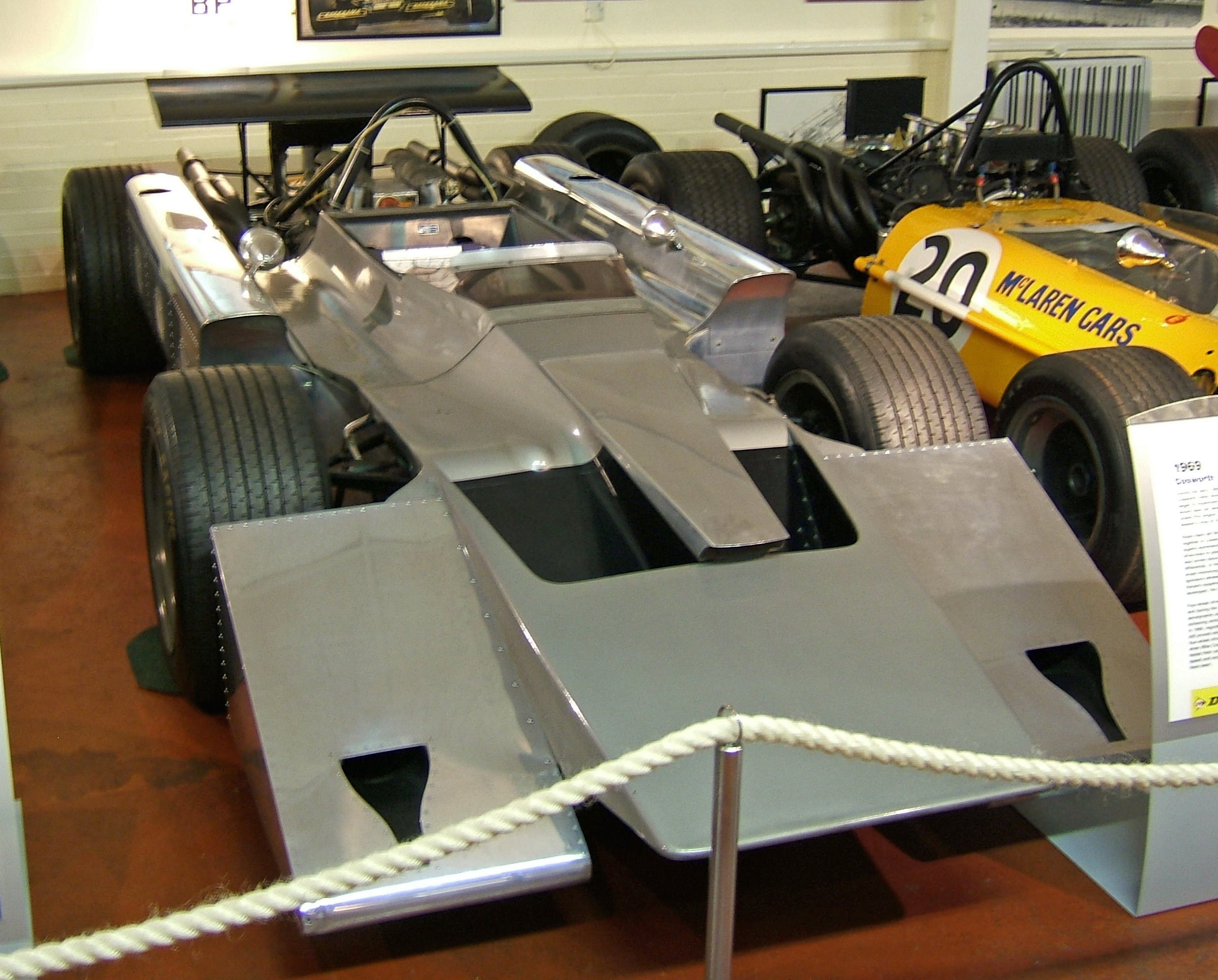
The four-wheel drive Cosworth Formula One car

Cosworth made an attempt at designing a full Formula One Grand Prix car in 1969. The car, designed by Robin Herd, used an original 4WD transmission designed by Keith Duckworth (different from the Ferguson used by all other 4WD F1 cars of the 1960s) and powered by a magnesium version of the DFV unit. The car was planned to drive at the 1969 British Grand Prix, but it was silently withdrawn. When Herd left to form March Engineering, the project was cancelled. The external design of the car was a product of Herd's use of Mallite sheeting (a wood-aluminium laminate composite) for the principal structural monocoque sections, a technique he pioneered on the first McLaren single-seat cars, including the McLaren M2B of 1966.

== Summary of F1 engine use ==
| Season | Engine | Type | Disp. | Teams | Wins | Notes |
|---|---|---|---|---|---|---|
| 1963 | Mk.IX | I4 | 1.5 | Lotus | 0 | The first 'Ford' Formula One engine entry |
| 1964 | Mk.XVI | I4 | 1.5 | Cooper | 0 | Entered as 'Ford 109E' |
| 1965 | Mk.XVI | I4 | 1.5 | Lotus, Cooper | 0 | Entered as 'Ford 109E' |
| 1966 | SCA | I4 | 1.0 | Brabham, Lotus, Matra | 0 | Entered as Formula Two entires with 'Cosworth SCA' engines |
| 1967 | FVA | I4 | 1.6 | Brabham, Lola, Lotus, Matra, Protos | 4 | Debut of DFV; Lotus second in Constructors' Championship |
| 1967 | DFV | V8 | 3.0 | Lotus | 4 | Debut of DFV; Lotus second in Constructors' Championship |
| 1968 | DFV | V8 | 3.0 | Lotus, McLaren, Matra | 11 | Cosworth powered cars won all but one Grand Prix.; Graham Hill (Lotus) won Drivers' Championship, 2nd and 3rd placed drivers were also Cosworth powered.; The 3 Cosworth-powered teams took 1st (Lotus), 2nd and 3rd places in the Constructors' Championship. |
| 1968 | FVA | I4 | 1.6 | Matra | 11 | Cosworth powered cars won all but one Grand Prix.; Graham Hill (Lotus) won Drivers' Championship, 2nd and 3rd placed drivers were also Cosworth powered.; The 3 Cosworth-powered teams took 1st (Lotus), 2nd and 3rd places in the Constructors' Championship. |
| 1969 | DFV | V8 | 3.0 | Matra, Brabham, Lotus, McLaren | 11 | Cosworth powered cars won every Grand Prix this season.; Jackie Stewart (Matra) won Drivers' Championship; Matra won Constructors' Championship. |
| 1969 | FVA | I4 | 1.6 | Brabham, Lotus, Matra, Tecno | 11 | Cosworth powered cars won every Grand Prix this season.; Jackie Stewart (Matra) won Drivers' Championship; Matra won Constructors' Championship. |
| 1970 | DFV | V8 | 3.0 | Lotus, March, McLaren, Brabham, Surtees, Tyrrell, Bellasi, De Tomaso | 8 | Jochen Rindt (Lotus) posthumously won Drivers' Championship |
| 1971 | DFV | V8 | 3.0 | Tyrrell, March, Lotus, McLaren, Surtees, Brabham, Bellasi | 7 | Jackie Stewart (Tyrrell) won Drivers' Championship; Tyrrell won Constructors' Championship |
| 1972 | DFV | V8 | 3.0 | McLaren, Lotus, Tyrrell, Surtees, March, Brabham, Poiltoys, Connew | 10 | Emerson Fittipaldi (Lotus) won Drivers' Championship; Lotus won Constructors' Championship |
| 1973 | DFV | V8 | 3.0 | Lotus, Tyrrell, McLaren, Brabham, March, Shadow, Surtees, Iso–Marlboro, Ensign | 15 | Cosworth powered cars won every Grand Prix this season.; Jackie Stewart (Tyrrell) won Drivers' Championship; Lotus won Constructors' Championship |
| 1974 | DFV | V8 | 3.0 | McLaren, Tyrrell, Lotus, Brabham, Hesketh, Shadow, March, Iso–Marlboro, Surtees, Lola, Token, Trojan, Penske, Parnelli, Lyncar, Ensign, Amon, Maki | 12 | Emerson Fittipaldi (McLaren) won Drivers' Championship |
| 1975 | DFV | V8 | 3.0 | McLaren, Brabham, Hesketh, Tyrrell, Shadow, March, Lotus, Williams, Parnelli, Hill, Penske, Ensign, Fittipaldi, Lyncar, Lola, Maki, Surtees | 8 | Cosworth powered teams filled 2nd to 17th places in the Constructors' Championship |
| 1976 | DFV | V8 | 3.0 | Tyrrell, McLaren, Lotus, Penske, March, Shadow, Surtees, Fittipaldi, Ensign, Parnelli, Wolf–Williams, Williams, Kojima, Hesketh, Maki, Brabham, Boro | 10 | James Hunt (McLaren) won Drivers' Championship |
| 1977 | DFV | V8 | 3.0 | Lotus, McLaren, Wolf, Tyrrell, Shadow, Fittipaldi, Ensign, Surtees, Penske, Williams, Boro, LEC, McGuire, Kojima, Hesketh, March | 12 | |
| 1978 | DFV | V8 | 3.0 | Lotus, Tyrrell, Wolf, Fittipaldi, McLaren, Arrows, Williams, Shadow, Surtees, Ensign, Martini, Hesketh, ATS, Theodore, Merzario, March | 9 | Mario Andretti (Lotus) won Drivers' Championship; Lotus won Constructors' Championship |
| 1979 | DFV | V8 | 3.0 | Williams, Ligier, Lotus, Tyrrell, McLaren, Arrows, Shadow, ATS, Fittipaldi, Kauhsen, Wolf, Brabham, Ensign, Rebaque, Merzario | 8 | Cosworth-powered teams took 2nd, 3rd and 4th place in Constructors' Championship |
| 1980 | DFV | V8 | 3.0 | Williams, Ligier, Brabham, Lotus, Tyrrell, McLaren, Arrows, Fittipaldi, Shadow, ATS, Osella, Ensign | 11 | Alan Jones (Williams) won Drivers' Championship; Williams won Constructors' Championship |
| 1981 | DFV | V8 | 3.0 | Williams, Brabham, McLaren, Lotus, Tyrrell, Arrows, Ensign, Theodore, ATS, Fittipaldi, Osella, March | 8 | Nelson Piquet (Brabham) won Drivers' Championship; Williams won Constructors' Championship |
| 1982 | DFV | V8 | 3.0 | McLaren, Williams, Lotus, Tyrrell, Brabham, Arrows, ATS, Osella, Fittipaldi, March, Theodore, Ensign | 8 | Keke Rosberg (Williams) won Drivers' Championship |
| 1983 | DFY | V8 | 3.0 | Williams, McLaren, Tyrrell | 3 | Michele Alboreto (Tyrrell) took the DFV series' final race victory at Detroit |
| 1983 | DFV | V8 | 3.0 | Williams, McLaren, Tyrrell, Arrows, Lotus, Theodore, Osella, RAM, Ligier | 3 | Michele Alboreto (Tyrrell) took the DFV series' final race victory at Detroit |
| 1984 | DFY | V8 | 3.0 | Tyrrell | 0 | |
| 1984 | DFV | V8 | 3.0 | Arrows, Spirit | 0 | |
| 1985 | DFY | V8 | 3.0 | Tyrrell | 0 | |
| 1985 | DFV | V8 | 3.0 | Minardi | 0 | |
| 1986 | GBA | V6-T | 1.5 | Haas Lola | 0 | First Cosworth engine to use a turbo in F1, and first non-V8 V engine |
| 1987 | GBA | V6-T | 1.5 | Benetton | 0 | Benetton reach 1000+ bhp with qualifying spec turbo engine |
| 1987 | DFZ | V8 | 3.5 | Tyrrell, Larrousse, AGS, March, Coloni | 0 | Benetton reach 1000+ bhp with qualifying spec turbo engine |
| 1988 | DFR | V8 | 3.5 | Benetton | 0 | Dallara used a Formula 3000 car in the opening round in Brazil but did not pre-qualify. This was the last F1 race for the DFV engine |
| 1988 | DFZ | V8 | 3.5 | Tyrrell, Rial, Minardi, Coloni, Larrousse, AGS, EuroBrun, Dallara | 0 | Dallara used a Formula 3000 car in the opening round in Brazil but did not pre-qualify. This was the last F1 race for the DFV engine |
| 1988 | DFV | V8 | 3.0 | Dallara | 0 | Dallara used a Formula 3000 car in the opening round in Brazil but did not pre-qualify. This was the last F1 race for the DFV engine |
| 1989 | HB | V8 | 3.5 | Benetton | 1 | Alessandro Nannini (Benetton) takes Cosworth's first win with a non-DFV engine design at Suzuka |
| 1989 | DFR | V8 | 3.5 | Benetton, Tyrrell, Arrows, Dallara, Minardi, Onyx, Ligier, Rial, AGS, Osella, Coloni | 1 | Alessandro Nannini (Benetton) takes Cosworth's first win with a non-DFV engine design at Suzuka |
| 1990 | HB | V8 | 3.5 | Benetton | 2 | |
| 1990 | DFR | V8 | 3.5 | Tyrrell, Arrows, Monteverdi, Ligier, Osella, Dallara, Coloni, AGS, Minardi | 2 | |
| 1991 | HB | V8 | 3.5 | Benetton, Jordan | 1 | DFV-series' last F1 season (DFR) |
| 1991 | DFR | V8 | 3.5 | Lola, Fondmetal, Coloni, AGS, Footwork | 1 | DFV-series' last F1 season (DFR) |
| 1992 | HB | V8 | 3.5 | Benetton, Lotus, Fondmetal | 1 | Michael Schumacher's first Grand Prix victory comes in a Cosworth-powered Benetton-Ford |
| 1993 | HB | V8 | 3.5 | McLaren, Benetton, Lotus, Minardi | 6 | |
| 1994 | EC Zetec-R | V8 | 3.5 | Benetton | 8 | Michael Schumacher (Benetton) won Drivers' Championship |
| 1994 | HB | V8 | 3.5 | Footwork, Minardi, Larrousse, Simtek | 8 | Michael Schumacher (Benetton) won Drivers' Championship |
| 1995 | ECA Zetec-R | V8 | 3.0 | Sauber | 0 | ECA engine is a developed 3-litre version of the 3.5litre EC Zetec-R V8. |
| 1995 | ED | V8 | 3.0 | Minardi, Forti, Simtek, Pacific | 0 | ECA engine is a developed 3-litre version of the 3.5litre EC Zetec-R V8. |
| 1996 | JD Zetec-R | V10 | 3.0 | Sauber | 0 | First Cosworth V10 design |
| 1996 | ECA Zetec-R | V8 | 3.0 | Forti | 0 | First Cosworth V10 design |
| 1996 | ED | V8 | 3.0 | Minardi | 0 | First Cosworth V10 design |
| 1997 | VJ Zetec-R | V10 | 3.0 | Stewart | 0 | |
| 1997 | ECA Zetec-R | V8 | 3.0 | Lola | 0 | |
| 1997 | ED | V8 | 3.0 | Tyrrell | 0 | |
| 1998 | VJ Zetec-R | V10 | 3.0 | Stewart | 0 | |
| 1998 | JD Zetec-R | V10 | 3.0 | Tyrrell, Minardi | 0 | |
| 1999 | CR-1 | V10 | 3.0 | Stewart | 1 | |
| 1999 | VJ Zetec-R | V10 | 3.0 | Minardi | 1 | |
| 2000 | CR-2 | V10 | 3.0 | Jaguar | 0 | Starting this year, Ford uses Cosworth for the engine names; Minardi engines rebadged as Fondmetal |
| 2000 | VJ Zetec-R | V10 | 3.0 | Minardi | 0 | Starting this year, Ford uses Cosworth for the engine names; Minardi engines rebadged as Fondmetal |
| 2001 | CR-3 | V10 | 3.0 | Jaguar | 0 | Minardi engines rebadged as European |
| 2001 | VJ Zetec-R | V10 | 3.0 | Minardi | 0 | Minardi engines rebadged as European |
| 2002 | CR-4 | V10 | 3.0 | Jaguar, Arrows | 0 | |
| 2002 | CR-3 | V10 | 3.0 | Jaguar, Arrows | 0 | |
| 2003 | CR-5 | V10 | 3.0 | Jaguar | 1 | Jordan engines use Ford name; Giancarlo Fisichella (Jordan) took Cosworth's last Grand Prix victory, at Interlagos |
| 2003 | RS1 | V10 | 3.0 | Jordan | 1 | Jordan engines use Ford name; Giancarlo Fisichella (Jordan) took Cosworth's last Grand Prix victory, at Interlagos |
| 2003 | CR-3 | V10 | 3.0 | Minardi | 1 | Jordan engines use Ford name; Giancarlo Fisichella (Jordan) took Cosworth's last Grand Prix victory, at Interlagos |
| 2004 | CR-6 | V10 | 3.0 | Jaguar | 0 | Jordan engines use Ford name |
| 2004 | RS2 | V10 | 3.0 | Jordan | 0 | Jordan engines use Ford name |
| 2004 | CR-3L | V10 | 3.0 | Minardi | 0 | Jordan engines use Ford name |
| 2005 | TJ2005 | V10 | 3.0 | Red Bull, Minardi | 0 | Minardi used the CK2004 (CR-3L) engine during the first 3 races of the season where the team used the old PS04B chassis. |
| 2006 | CA2006 | V8 | 2.4 | Williams | 0 | Toro Rosso V10s rev-limited |
| 2006 | TJ2005 | V10 | 3.0 | Toro Rosso | 0 | Toro Rosso V10s rev-limited |
2007–2009: Cosworth did not supply any engines in Formula One.
| 2010 | CA2010 | V8 | 2.4 | Williams, Lotus, HRT, Virgin | 0 | |
| 2011 | CA2011 | V8 | 2.4 | Williams, HRT, Virgin | 0 | |
| 2012 | CA2012 | V8 | 2.4 | HRT, Marussia | 0 | |
| 2013 | CA2013 | V8 | 2.4 | Marussia | 0 | |
2014–present: Cosworth has not been supplying any engines in Formula One.

== See also ==
- Marcos Engineering
- MAHLE Powertrain
