= List of Brabham racing cars =

The list below summarizes Brabham racing cars built by Motor Racing Developments in the United Kingdom.

Many of the earlier models are badged as Repco Brabhams.

Type number	Category	Years produced	Number built	Image
BT1	Formula Junior (original named MRD, later Brabham BT1)	1961	1	
BT2	Formula Junior	1962	11	
BT3	Formula One	1962	1	
BT4	Tasman Formula	1962	4	
BT5	Sports racing	1963	2	
BT6	Formula Junior	1963	20	
BT7	Formula One	1963	2	
BT7A	Tasman Formula	1963	2	
BT8	Sports racing	1964–66	12	
BT9	Formula Three	1964	13	
BT10	Formula Two	1964	17	
BT11	Formula One	1964	5	
BT11A	Tasman Formula	1964	5	
BT12	Championship car	1964	1	
BT14	Formula Libre	1965–1966	10	
BT15	Formula Three	1965–1966	Between 26 and 58	
BT16	Formula Two	1965	12	
BT16A	Formula Three	1965	21	
BT17	Sports racing	1966	1	
BT18	Formula Two	1966	6	
BT18A	Formula Three	1966	32	
BT18B	Honda Racing School	1966	8	
BT19	Formula One	1966	1	
BT20	Formula One	1966	2	
BT21	Formula Three	1966–1968	50	
BT21A	Formula Libre and Formula B	1967	10	
BT21B	Formula Three	1968	31	
BT21C	Formula Libre and Formula B	1968	18	
BT21X	Formula Three	1968	1	
BT22	Formula Libre	1966	1	
BT23	Formula Two	1967	9	
BT23A	Tasman Formula	1967	1	
BT23B	Formula Libre	1967	3	
BT23C	Formula Two	1967–1968	13	
BT23D	Tasman Formula	1967	1	
BT23E	Tasman Formula	1967	1	
BT23F	Formula B	1968	1	
BT23G	Formula B	1968	2	
BT24	Formula One	1967	3	
BT25	Indy car	1968	2	
BT26	Formula One	1968	3	
BT26A	Formula One	1969	3	
BT27	Formula One	Not built	0	
BT28	Formula Three	1969–1970	42	
BT29	Formula B	1969–1970	29	
BT30	Formula Two	1969–1970	26	
BT30X	Hillclimb	1969	2	
BT31	Tasman Formula	1969	1	
BT32	Indy car	1970	1	
BT33	Formula One	1970	4	
BT34	Formula One	1971	1	
BT35A	Formula Atlantic	1971	3	
BT35B	Formula B	1971	7	
BT35C	Formula Three	1971	27	
BT35X	Hillclimb	1971	4	
BT36	Formula Two	1971	9	
BT36X	Hillclimb	1971	1	
BT37	Formula One	1972	2	
BT38	Formula Two	1972	16	
BT38B	Formula B	1972	5	
BT38C	Formula Three	1972	14	
BT39	Formula One	1972	1	
BT40	Formula Two and Formula B	1973	28	
BT41	Formula Three	1973	21	
BT42	Formula One	1973	6	
BT43	Formula 5000	1973	1	
BT44	Formula One	1974	4	
BT44B	Formula One	1975	4	
BT45	Formula One	1976	5	
BT45B	Formula One	1977	1	
BT45C	Formula One	1978	2	
BT46	Formula One	1978	9	
BT47	Formula One	Not built	0	
BT48	Formula One	1979	4	
BT49	Formula One	1979	9	
BT49C	Formula One	1981	5	
BT49D	Formula One	1982	3	
BT50	Formula One	1982	5	
BT51	Formula One	1983	1	
BT52	Formula One	1983	6	
BT53	Formula One	1984	5	
BT54	Formula One	1985	9	
BT55	Formula One	1986	8	
BT56	Formula One	1987	4	
BT57	Alfa Romeo 164 with V10 engine	1988	2	
BT58	Formula One	1989	5	
BT59	Formula One	1990–1991	5	
BT60	Formula One	1991–1992	6	
BT61	Formula One	1992	?	
BT62	Track day car	2018	1	
BT63 GT2	SRO GT2	2021	?	
