= Marc Rostan =

French racing driver (born 1963)

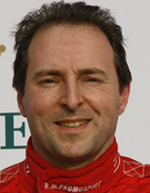
- Rostan in 2016
- Nationality: (France) French
- Born: 30 November 1963 (age 62) Paris, France
- Categorisation: FIA Silver (until 2014); FIA Bronze (2015–)

Marc Rostan (born 30 November 1963, in Paris) is a French racing driver.

Successes:

- 2015 – 3rd – Total 24Hours of Spa – Am
- 2006 – 3rd – Le Mans Series – LMP2
- 2004 – 3rd – Le Mans Endurance Series – LMP2
- 2003 – 3rd – FIA Sportscar Championship – Class SR2
- 1995 – 3rd – Le Mans 24Hours – LMP2 Class – Pole position
- 1993 – 3rd – (Championnat de France de Formule 3b)

4 wins (Barcelona (twice), Monza, Brno) and 18 podiums

== Racing record ==
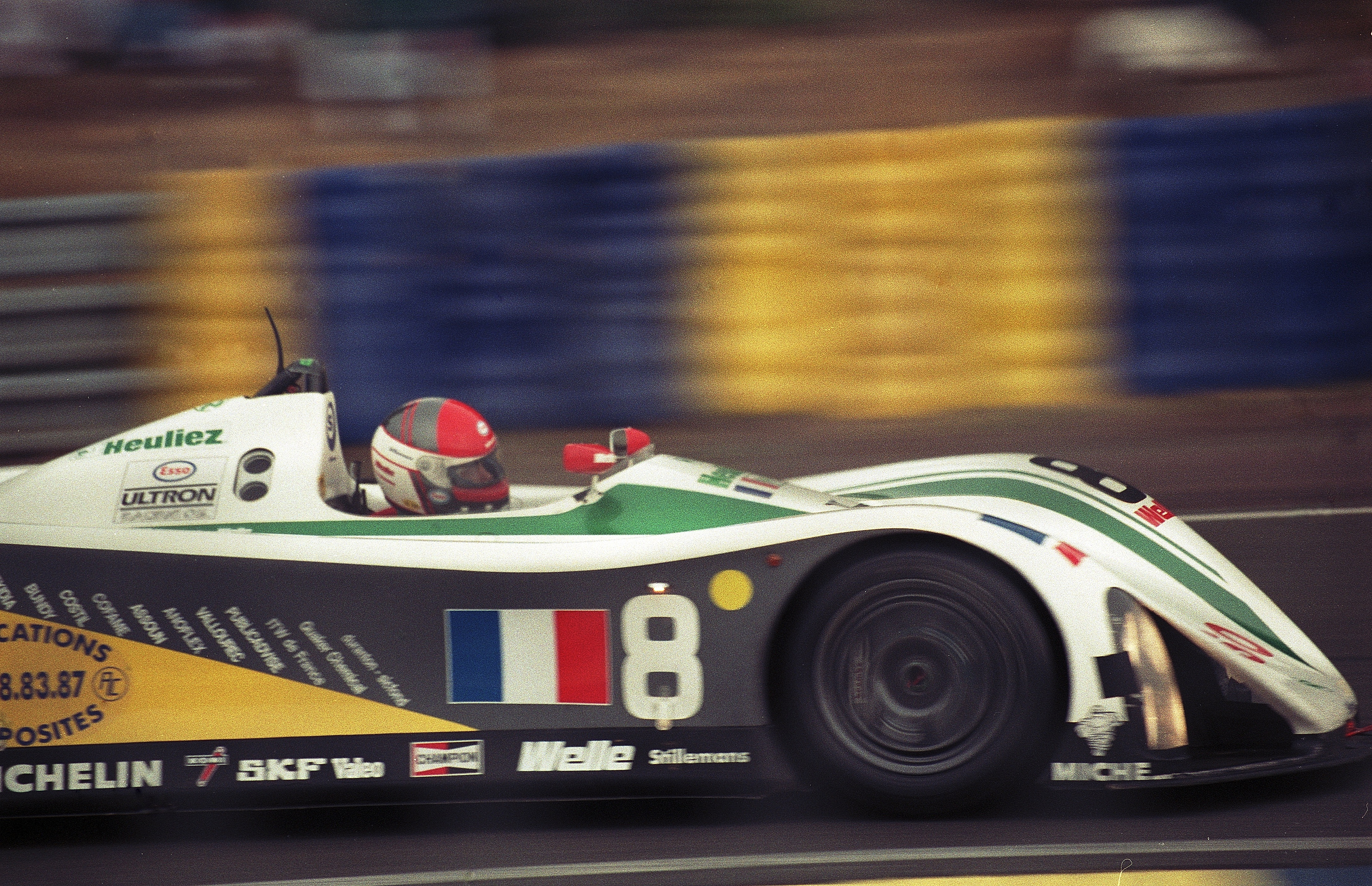
Rostan racing for Welter Racing at the 1995 Le Mans 24 Hours.

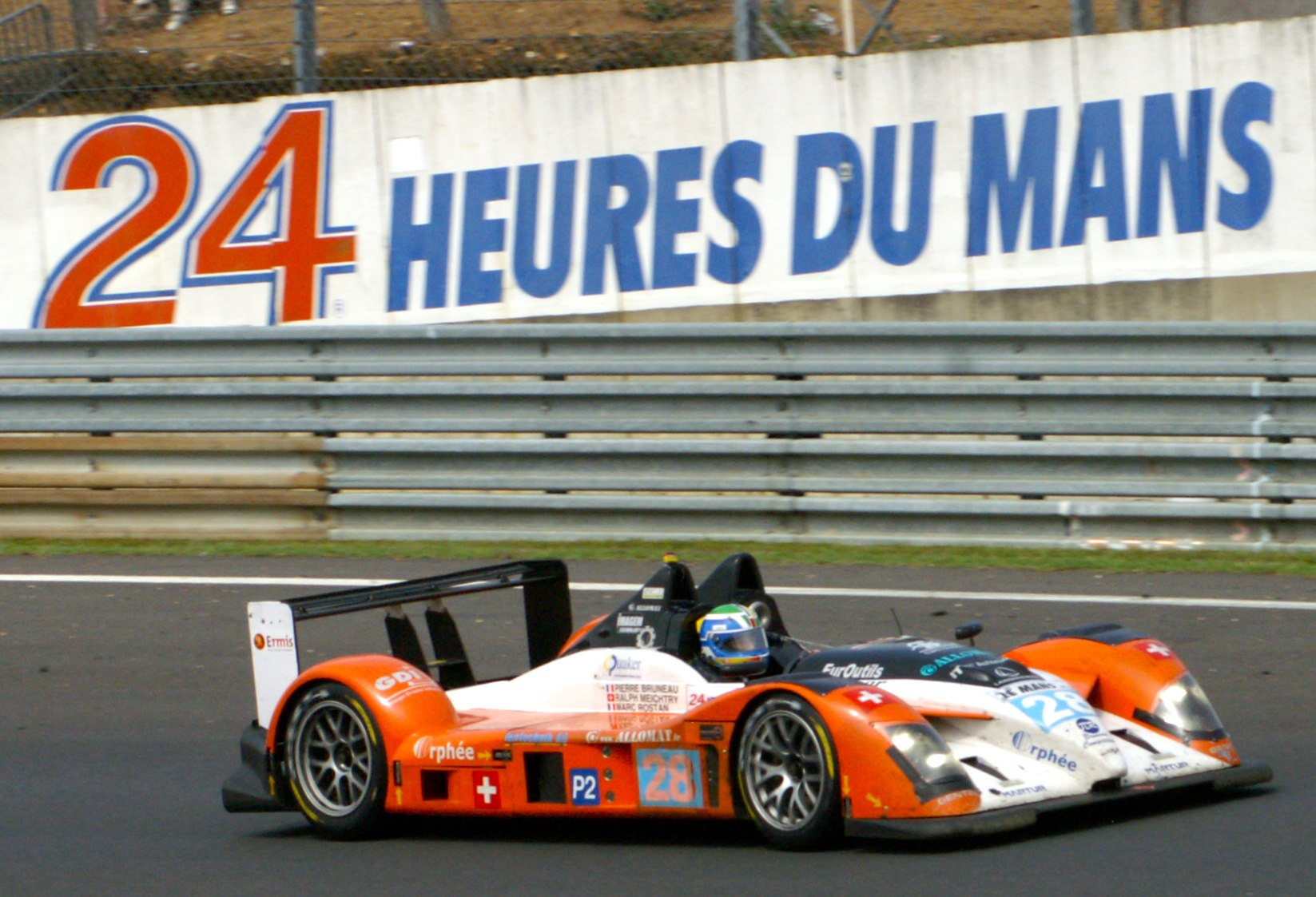
Rostan's Radical LMP2 at the 2010 Le Mans 24 Hours.

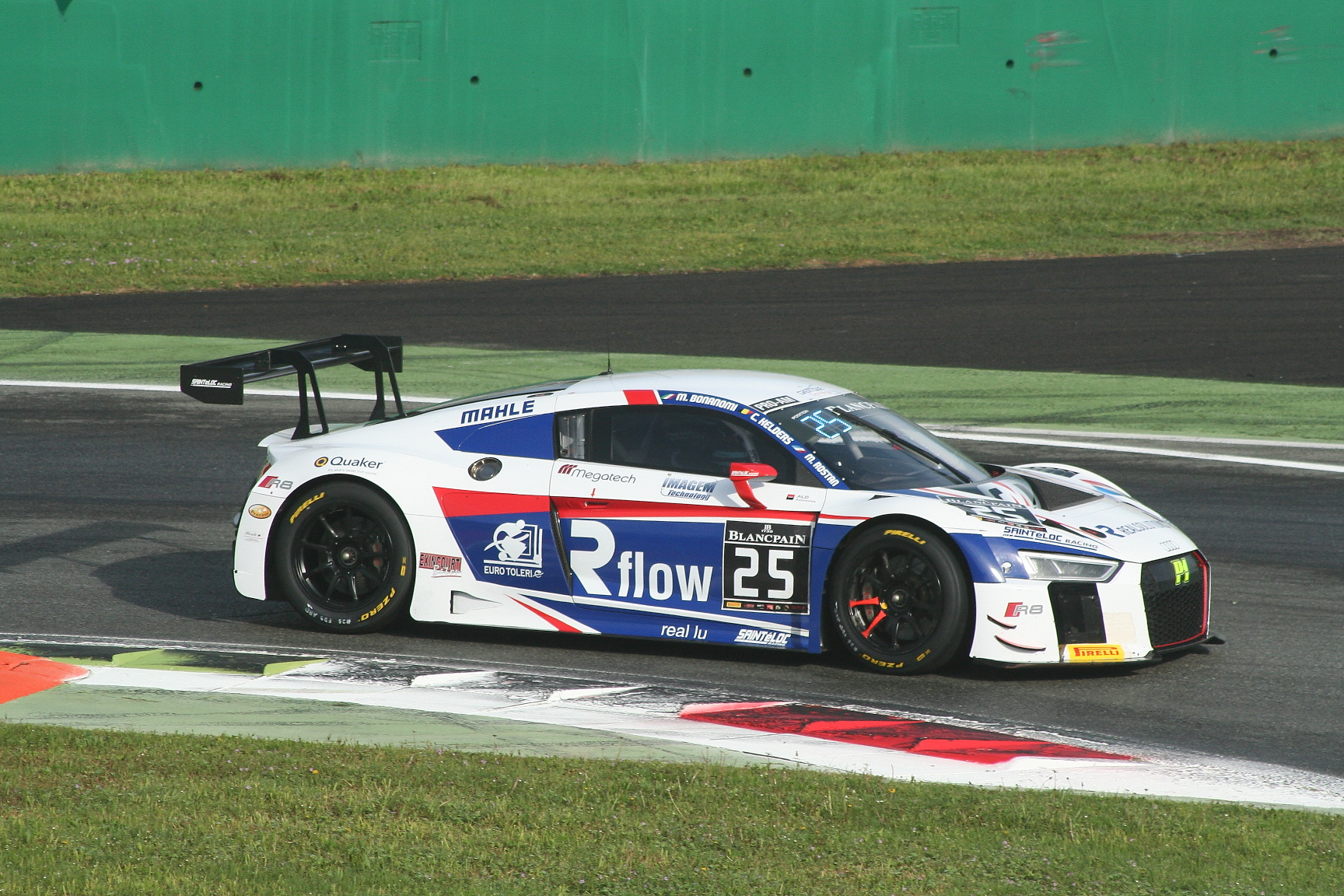
Rostan's Saintéloc Audi at Monza in 2016.

=== Complete International Formula 3000 results ===
(key) (Races in bold indicate pole position) (Races in italics indicate fastest lap)

Year	Entrant	1	2	3	4	5	6	7	8	9	10	DC	Points
1994	Omegaland	SIL	PAU	CAT	PER	HOC	SPA	EST; Ret	MAG; 14			NC	0
1995	Gosselin Competition	SIL	CAT	PAU	PER	HOC	SPA	EST; 16	MAG; 16			29th	0
1996	Madgwick International	NÜR	PAU	PER	HOC	SIL	SPA	MAG	EST	MUG; 23	HOC; Ret	28th	0

=== 24 Hours of Le Mans results ===
Year	Team	Co-Drivers	Car	Class	Laps	Pos.	Class Pos.
1995	(France) Welter Racing	(France) Patrick Gonin (France) Pierre Petit	WR LM94	LMP2	33	DNF	DNF
1996	(France) Welter Racing SARL	(France) Patrick Gonin (France) Pierre Petit	WR LM96	LMP2	221	DNF	DNF
1999	(France) Paul Belmondo Racing	(Portugal) Tiago Monteiro (France) Paul Belmondo	Chrysler Viper GTS-R	GTS	299	17th	6th
2005	(France) Pir Compétition	(France) Pierre Bruneau (France) Philippe Haezebrouck	Pilbeam MP93	LMP2	32	DNF	DNF
2006	(France) Pir Compétition	(United Kingdom) Simon Pullan (United States) Chris MacAllister	Pilbeam MP93	LMP2	244	26th NC	7th
2007	(France) Pir Compétition	(United States) Chris MacAllister (United Kingdom) Gavin Pickering	Pilbeam MP93	LMP2	126	DNF	DNF
2008	(United Kingdom) Team Bruichladdich Radical	(United States) Gunnar Jeannette (United Kingdom) Ben Devlin	Radical SR9-AER	LMP2	297	31st	6th
2009	(United Kingdom) Bruichladdich-Bruneau Team	(France) Pierre Bruneau (United Kingdom) Tim Greaves	Radical SR9-AER	LMP2	91	DNF	DNF
2010	(Switzerland) Race Performance AG	(France) Pierre Bruneau (Switzerland) Ralph Meichtry	Radical SR9-Judd	LMP2	321	18th	6th
2011	(Switzerland) Race Performance	(Switzerland) Michel Frey (Switzerland) Ralph Meichtry	Oreca 03-Judd-BMW	LMP2	304	19th	6th
2012	(United Arab Emirates) Gulf Racing Middle East	(Japan) Keiko Ihara (Switzerland) Jean-Denis Délétraz	Lola B12/80-Nissan	LMP2	17	DNF	DNF
