= Trophées de France =

French domestic racing championship, 1964-67

- Category: Formula Two
- Country: France
- Inaugural season: 1964
- Folded: 1967
- Last Drivers' champion: (Austria) Jochen Rindt
- Last Teams' champion: (United Kingdom) Roy Winkelmann Racing

The Trophées de France, was a domestic championship which took place in France for between 1964 and 1967, for Formula Two cars.

== History ==
Formula Two was the traditionally been regarded as the last major stepping stone for F1 hopefuls - it is typically the last point in a driver's career at which most drivers in the series are aiming at professional careers in racing rather than being amateurs and enthusiasts.

Most notably thing with the Trophées de France, it was domination by one marque, who won three of the four titles. In 1964, 1966 and 1967, these titles were won by drivers using Brabham cars.

== Champions ==
Season	Champion	Team	Car
1964	(Australia) Jack Brabham	Brabham Racing Organisation	Brabham-Cosworth BT10
1965	(United Kingdom) Jim Clark	Ron Harris – Team Lotus	Lotus-Cosworth 35
1966	(Australia) Jack Brabham	Brabham Racing Organisation	Brabham-Honda BT18
1967	(Austria) Jochen Rindt	Roy Winkelmann Racing	Brabham-Cosworth BT23
