= 1966 Grand Prix de Rouen-les-Essarts =

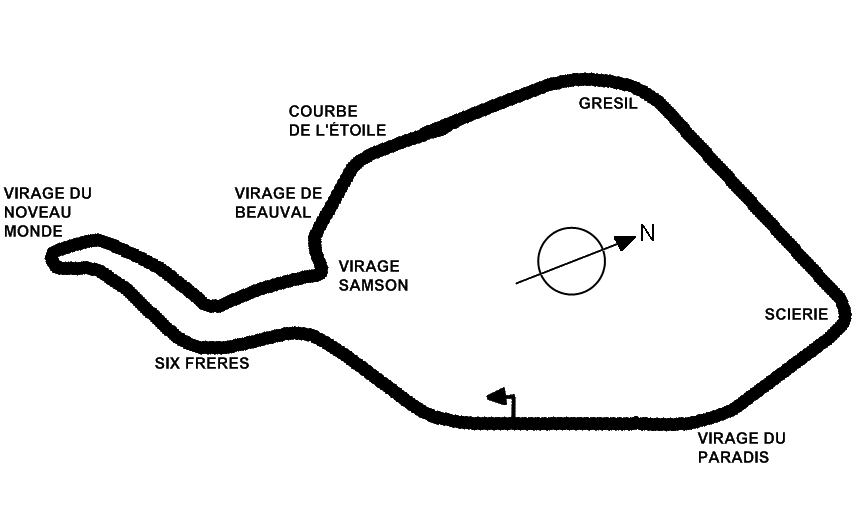
Circuit de Rouen-les-Essarts (1955-1971)

The 14th Grand Prix de Rouen-les-Essarts, was the third round of the 1966 Trophées de France. It was held on the Circuit de Rouen-les-Essarts, in Grand-Couronne, near Rouen, on the 10 July. This Formula Two race was only a week after the previous round at Reims, and the cars were brought over from there and assembled in time for opening qualifying on the Thursday. Qualifying was scheduled for Thursday and Friday. This allowed those drivers competing in the Martini Trophy race at Slverstone to practise and then fly to England for the sportscar race and return to Northern France in time for the race on Sunday.

== Report ==
=== Entry ===
A total of 26 F2 cars were entered for the event, of which 22 took part in qualifying. Of those 22, plenty of big names turned out. The championship leaders, Jack Brabham and Denny Hulme arrived with their Honda S100–powered Brabhams, hoping to continue their good form, as Brabham had won the two previous races at Pau and Reims. Roy Winkelmann brought two Cosworth-powered Brabhams for Jochen Rindt and Alan Rees, while John Surtees, Jacky Ickx, Graham Hill and Jean-Pierre Beltoise were scheduled to drive Matra-BRMs, although Surtees’ car was fitted with a Cosworth engine.

=== Qualifying ===
Thursday’s qualifying session was uneventful, with most teams trying to sort their cars for the weekend ahead. Jack Brabham turned in the fastest lap, timed at 2min 14.9, Jochen Rindt managed a 2:15.8 lap. Denny Hulme was unable to record a time below 2:16, while of the rest of field could not better 2:17.

Friday’s session was very different, with everyone trying to set a competitive time. Nevertheless, Brabham’s pole time of 2min 10.7 (averaging a speed of 112.018 mph) was a full two seconds quicker than his team-mate Hulme, and nearly 4½ seconds ahead of everyone else. Third was claimed by Jochen Rindt, in a time of 2:15.1, with half a second covering the next four drivers; John Surtees, Graham Hill, Jean-Pierre Beltoise and Richard Attwood. Saturday’s Martini Trophy race at Silverstone, saw Denny Hulme victorious.

=== Race ===
On the Sunday, the Grand Prix de Rouen-les-Essarts was held over 46 laps of the Circuit de Rouen-les-Essarts.

Jochen Rindt got the jump, when the flag dropped, over the dominant Brabham-Hondas, leading into the first corner. However, by the Virage du Nouveau Monda (turn four), Jack Brabham was past and opened a three-second lead by the end of lap one. Rindt was second, following by Jean-Pierre Beltoise, Graham Hill, Alan Rees and Richard Attwood.

Meanwhile, back in ninth place was Denny Hulme. Although Brabham was pulling away at a rate of three seconds a lap, Hulme had passed everyone bar his team leader by lap 4, ahead of John Surtees, Beltoise, Rees and Rindt.

While the Brabham-Hondas headed off into the distance, Rindt made his way back to third, then pulled away from his pursuers. On lap 14, Brabham set the fastest lap of the race, with a 2m 14.6 lap. By this stage, Hulme was 3s behind and a gap of 15s to Rindt.

By half distance (lap 23), only ten cars remained on the lead lap. Rindt’s excellent drive came to an end, when his gearbox failed, while the Brabham pairing steamed on relentlessly. Then Rees held third, and immediately set about closing the gap to Hulme, halving the gap from 45s to 23s. Hulme’s car began sounding rough, and just six laps from the end of the race, Brabham stopped on the circuit with a broken gearlever, robbing him of a comfortable third straight Trophées de France win.

Hulme reeled off the remaining laps to secure his first Trophées de France win for two years, with Rees finishing second, 15s behind. Following mechanical problems to many of the cars, Pedro Rodríguez inherited third. Kurt Ahrens Jr. managed to claim fourth place from Hill, just a few corners from home, Hill finished fifth with Trevor Blokdyk sixth.

Denny Hulme took the winner's spoils for the works Brabham team, driving their Brabham-Honda BT18. Hulme won in a time of 1hr 46:33.5mins., averaging a speed of 105.313 mph.

== Classification ==
=== Race result ===
Pos.	No.	Driver	Entrant	Car - Engine	Time, Laps	Reason Out
1st	10	(New Zealand) Denny Hulme	Brabham Racing Developments	Brabham-Honda BT18	1hr 46:33.5	
2nd	24	(United Kingdom) Alan Rees	Roy Winkelmann Racing	Brabham-Cosworth BT18	1hr 46:58.7	
3rd	2	(Mexico) Pedro Rodríguez	Ron Harris – Team Lotus	Lotus-Cosworth 44	1hr 47:54.0	
4th	42	(Germany) Kurt Ahrens Jr.	Caltex Racing Team	Brabham-Cosworth BT18	1hr 48:41.4	
5th	6	(United Kingdom) Graham Hill	John Coombs	Matra-BRM MS5	1hr 48:46.3	
6th	16	(South Africa) Trevor Blokdyk	Ron Harris – Team Lotus	Lotus-Cosworth 44	45	
7th	12	(United Kingdom) John Surtees	Tyrrell Racing Organisation	Matra-Cosworth MS5	44	Differential
8th	26	(United Kingdom) Richard Attwood	Midland Racing Partnership	Lola-Cosworth T61	43	Bearing
9th	36	(France) Eric Offenstadt	Eric Offenstadt	Lola-BRM T60	43	
DNF	8	(Australia) Jack Brabham	Brabham Racing Developments	Brabham-Honda BT18	40	Gear Lever
DNF	20	(France) Jo Schlesser	Matra Sports	Matra-Cosworth MS5	32	Oil radiator
DNF	22	(Austria) Jochen Rindt	Roy Winklemann Racing	Brabham-Cosworth BT18	27	Gearbox
DNF	18	(France) Jean-Pierre Beltoise	Matra Sports	Matra-Cosworth MS5	26	Radiator
DNF	38	(Switzerland) Silvio Moser	Martinelli-Sonvico	Brabham-Cosworth BT16	26	
DNF	4	(United Kingdom) Peter Arundell	Ron Harris - Team Lotus	Lotus-Cosworth 44	22	Engine
DNF	44	(United Kingdom) David Prophet	David Prophet Racing	Brabham-Cosworth BT10	21	
DNF	30	(United Kingdom) Trevor Taylor	Aurora Gear Racing	Brabham-Cosworth BT16	21	
DNF	40	(United Kingdom) Bob Anderson	Bob Gerard – Cooper Racing	Cooper-Cosworth T82	14	
DNF	28	(Australia) Paul Hawkins	Mildland Racing Partnership	Lola-Cosworth T60	12	Puncture
DNF	14	(Belgium) Jacky Ickx	Tyrrell Racing Organisation	Matra-BRM MS5	9	
DNF	34	(Sweden) Jo Bonnier	Ecurie Suisse	Cooper-Cosworth T82	5	Gearbox
DNS	8	(France) Henri Grandsire	Société des Automobiles Alpine	Alpine-Gordini A270		Car too slow

- Fastest lap: Jack Brabham, 2:14.6ecs. (105.772 mph)
