= Circuit de la Sarthe =

Race course in Le Mans, France

Circuit des 24 Heures
Circuit de la Sarthe

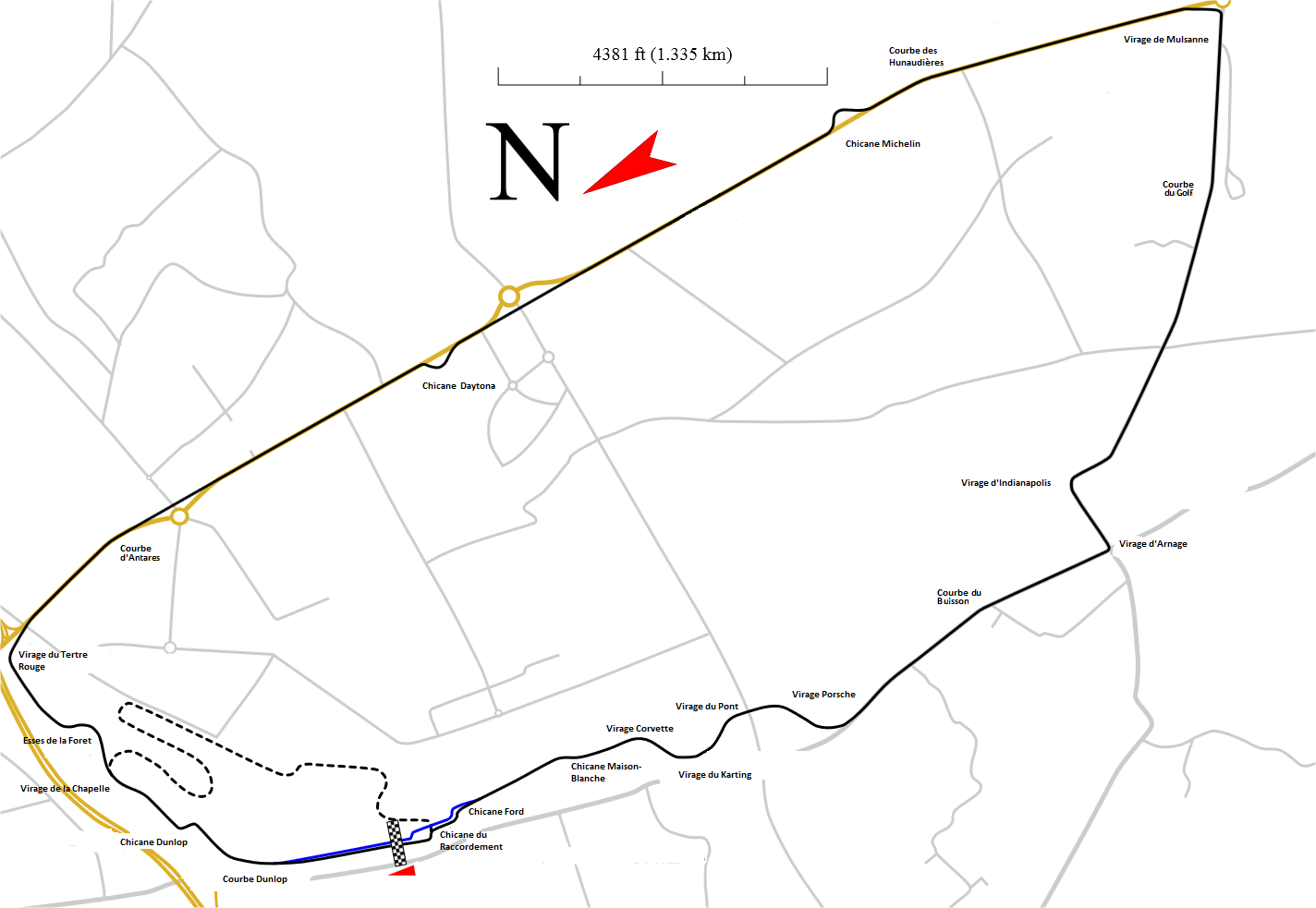
- Circuit des 24 Heures du Mans (2018–present)
- Location: Le Mans, Pays de la Loire, France
- Coordinates: FR-72_dim:5km 47°56′N 0°14′E
- FIA Grade: 2 (Endurance)
- Owner: Automobile Club de l'Ouest; Ville du Mans
- Operator: Automobile Club de l'Ouest
- Opened: 26 May 1923; 103 years ago
- Major events: Current: FIA WEC; 24 Hours of Le Mans (1923–1935, 1937–1939, 1949–present); Le Mans Classic (intermittently 2002–2018, 2021–2023, 2025); FIM EWC; 24 Heures Motos (1978–present); MotoGP; French motorcycle Grand Prix (1969–1970, 1976, 1979, 1983, 1985, 1987, 1989–1990, 1994–1995, 2000–present); Vitesse du Mans motorcycle Grand Prix (1991); Former: World Sportscar Championship (1953–1955, 1957–1974, 1980–1989, 1991–1992)
- Website: http://www.lemans.org/en/

Circuit des 24 Heures du Mans (2018–present)
- Surface: Tarmac
- Length: 13.626 km (8.467 mi)
- Turns: 38
- Race lap record: 3:17.297 ( (United Kingdom) Mike Conway, Toyota TS050 Hybrid, 2019, LMP1)

Circuit de la Sarthe (2007–2017)
- Surface: Tarmac
- Length: 13.629 km (8.469 mi)
- Turns: 38
- Race lap record: 3:17.475 ( (Germany) André Lotterer, Audi R18, 2015, LMP1)

Circuit de la Sarthe (2002–2006)
- Surface: Tarmac
- Length: 13.650 km (8.482 mi)
- Turns: 38
- Race lap record: 3:31.211 ( (Denmark) Tom Kristensen, Audi R10 TDI, 2006, LMP1)

Circuit de la Sarthe (1997–2001)
- Surface: Tarmac
- Length: 13.605 km (8.454 mi)
- Turns: 36
- Race lap record: 3:35.032 ( (Japan) Ukyo Katayama, Toyota GT-One, 1999, LMGTP)

Circuit de la Sarthe (1990–1996)
- Surface: Tarmac
- Length: 13.600 km (8.451 mi)
- Turns: 36
- Race lap record: 3:27.470 ( (United Kingdom) Eddie Irvine, Toyota TS010, 1993, Group C1)

Circuit de la Sarthe (1987–1989)
- Surface: Tarmac
- Length: 13.535 km (8.410 mi)
- Turns: 30
- Race lap record: 3:21.270 ( (France) Alain Ferté, Jaguar XJR-9, 1989, Group C1)

Circuit de la Sarthe (1986)
- Surface: Tarmac
- Length: 13.528 km (8.406 mi)
- Turns: 28
- Race lap record: 3:23.300 ( (West Germany) Klaus Ludwig, Porsche 956B, 1986, Group C1)

Circuit de la Sarthe (1979–1985)
- Surface: Tarmac
- Length: 13.626 km (8.467 mi)
- Turns: 27
- Race lap record: 3:25.100 ( (West Germany) Jochen Mass, Porsche 962C, 1985, Group C1)

Circuit de la Sarthe (1972–1978)
- Surface: Tarmac
- Length: 13.640 km (8.476 mi)
- Turns: 26
- Race lap record: 3:34.200 ( (France) Jean-Pierre Jabouille, Renault Alpine A443, 1978, Group 6)

Circuit de la Sarthe (1968–1971)
- Surface: Tarmac
- Length: 13.469 km (8.369 mi)
- Turns: 19
- Race lap record: 3:18.400 ( (United Kingdom) Jackie Oliver, Porsche 917L, 1971, Group 5)

Circuit de la Sarthe (1956–1967)
- Surface: Tarmac
- Length: 13.461 km (8.364 mi)
- Turns: 17
- Race lap record: 3:23.600 ( (United States) Mario Andretti/ (New Zealand) Denny Hulme, Ford GT40 Mk IV, 1967, Group 4)

Circuit de la Sarthe (1932–1955)
- Surface: Tarmac
- Length: 13.492 km (8.384 mi)
- Turns: 17
- Race lap record: 4:06.600 ( (United Kingdom) Mike Hawthorn, Jaguar D-Type, 1955, Sports prototype)

Circuit de la Sarthe (1929–1931)
- Surface: Tarmac
- Length: 16.340 km (10.153 mi)
- Turns: 17
- Race lap record: 6:48.000 ( (United Kingdom) Henry Birkin, Bentley Blower, 1930, Sports prototype)

Circuit de la Sarthe (1923–1928)
- Surface: Tarmac
- Length: 17.262 km (10.726 mi)
- Turns: 16
- Race lap record: 8:07.000 ( (United Kingdom) Henry Birkin, Bentley 4½ Litre, 1928, Sports prototype)

The Circuit de la Sarthe, known for its Circuit des 24 Heures du Mans variation after the 24-hour semi-permanent circuit, located in Le Mans, Sarthe, France, is a permanent auto sport circuit. It is the host of the 24 Hours of Le Mans auto race and widely known as the site of the 1955 Le Mans disaster, the deadliest event in motorsport history.

The track comprises a combination of private, race-specific sections of track in addition to public roads used only during the 24 Hours of Le Mans which remain accessible most of the year. Its present 24 hour configuration is 13.626 km (8.467 mi) long, making it one of the longest circuits in the world. The capacity of the permanent race track the short Bugatti Circuit is 100,000. The Musée des 24 Heures du Mans is a motorsport museum for the 24 hours of Le Mans located at the main entrance of the venue.

Up to 85% of the 24 hour circuit lap time is spent on full throttle, putting immense stress on engine and drivetrain components. Additionally, the times spent reaching maximum speed also mean tremendous wear on the brakes and suspension as cars must slow from over 322 km/h (200 mph) to around 100 km/h (62 mph) for the sharp corner at the village of Mulsanne.

== Track modifications ==
The road racing track, which was a triangle from Le Mans down south to Mulsanne, northwest to Arnage, and back north to Le Mans, has undergone many modifications over the years, with CIRCUIT N°15 being in use since 2018. Even with the modifications over the years, the Sarthe circuit remains very fast, with prototype cars achieving average lap speeds in excess of 240 km/h (150 mph).

In the 1920s, the cars drove from the present pits on Rue de Laigné straight into the city, then took a sharp right-hand corner near the river Huisne Pontlieue bridge (a hairpin removed from the circuit in 1929). They left the city on the rather straight section now named Avenue Georges Durand after the race's founder. Then 17.261 km (10.725 mi) long and unpaved, a bypass within the city shortened the track in 1929. The city was bypassed completely in 1932 with the addition of the section from the pits via the Dunlop Bridge and the Esses to Tertre Rouge. This classic configuration was 13.492 km (8.384 mi) long and remained almost unaltered even after the 1955 tragedy. Its frighteningly narrow pit straight was further narrowed to make room for the pits and was part of the road itself, without the road becoming wider around the pits, and no separation. The pit straight then was about 3.7 m (12 ft) wide, further widened in 1956 after the tragedy, but the race track and pits were not separated for another 15 years.

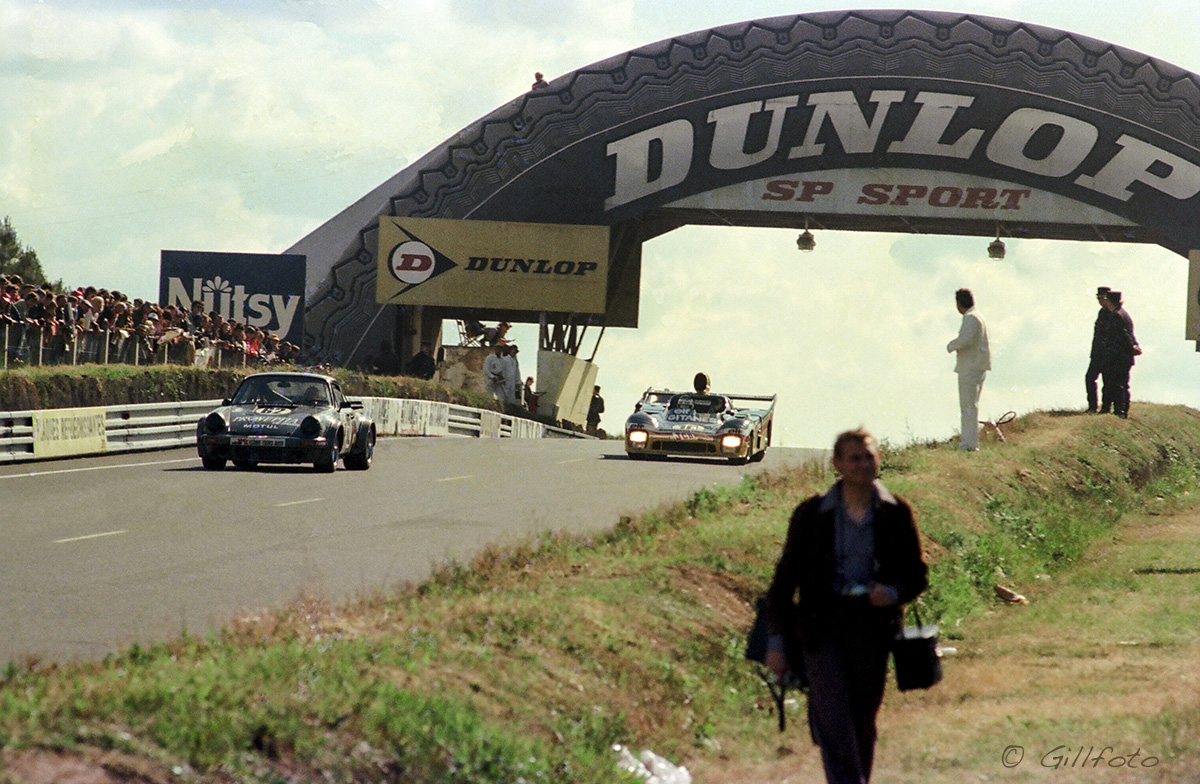
Dunlop Bridge in 1977

Car speeds increased dramatically in the 1960s, pushing the limits of the "classic circuit" and sparking criticism of the track as being unsafe after drivers died during trials. In 1965, a smaller Bugatti Circuit was added which shares the pit lane facilities and the first corner (including the famous Dunlop bridge) with the full "Le Mans" circuit. For the 1968 race, the Ford chicane was added before the pits to slow down the cars. The circuit was fitted with Armco barriers for the 1969 race. The "Maison Blanche" kink was particularly harrowing, claiming many cars over the years (including three Ferrari 512 variants) and several lives, including the legendary John Woolfe in 1969 behind the wheel of a Porsche 917. The circuit has been modified ten more times — 1971, a year when prototypes were averaging over 240 km/h (150 mph), was the last year the classic circuit was used. That year, an Armco barrier was added to the pit straight to separate the track from the pits. In 1972, the race track was considerably revamped, at a cost of 300 million francs, with modification of the pit area and the first and final straights, the addition of the quick Porsche curves bypassing "Maison Blanche", the signalling area being moved to the exit of the slow Mulsanne corner, and the track being resurfaced.

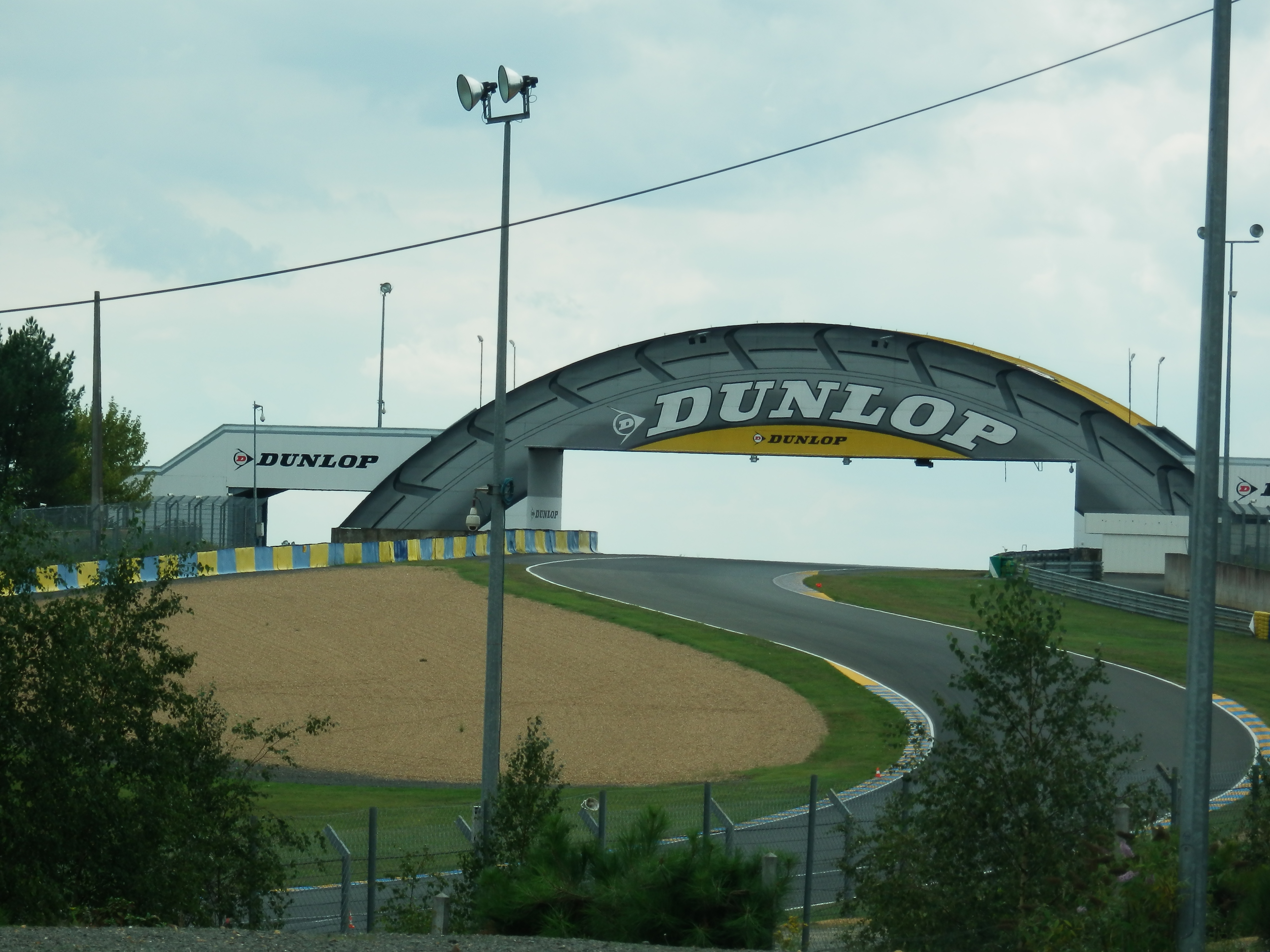
The esses after the Dunlop Bridge

In 1979, due to the construction of a new public road, the profile of "Tertre Rouge" had to be changed. This redesign led to a faster double-apex corner and saw the removal of the second Dunlop Bridge. In 1986, construction of a new roundabout at the Mulsanne corner demanded the addition a new portion of track in order to avoid the roundabout. This created a right hand kink before Mulsanne corner. In 1987, a chicane was added to the very fast Dunlop curve, where cars would go under the Dunlop bridge at 180 mph (290 km/h). Now they would be slowed to 110 mph (180 km/h).

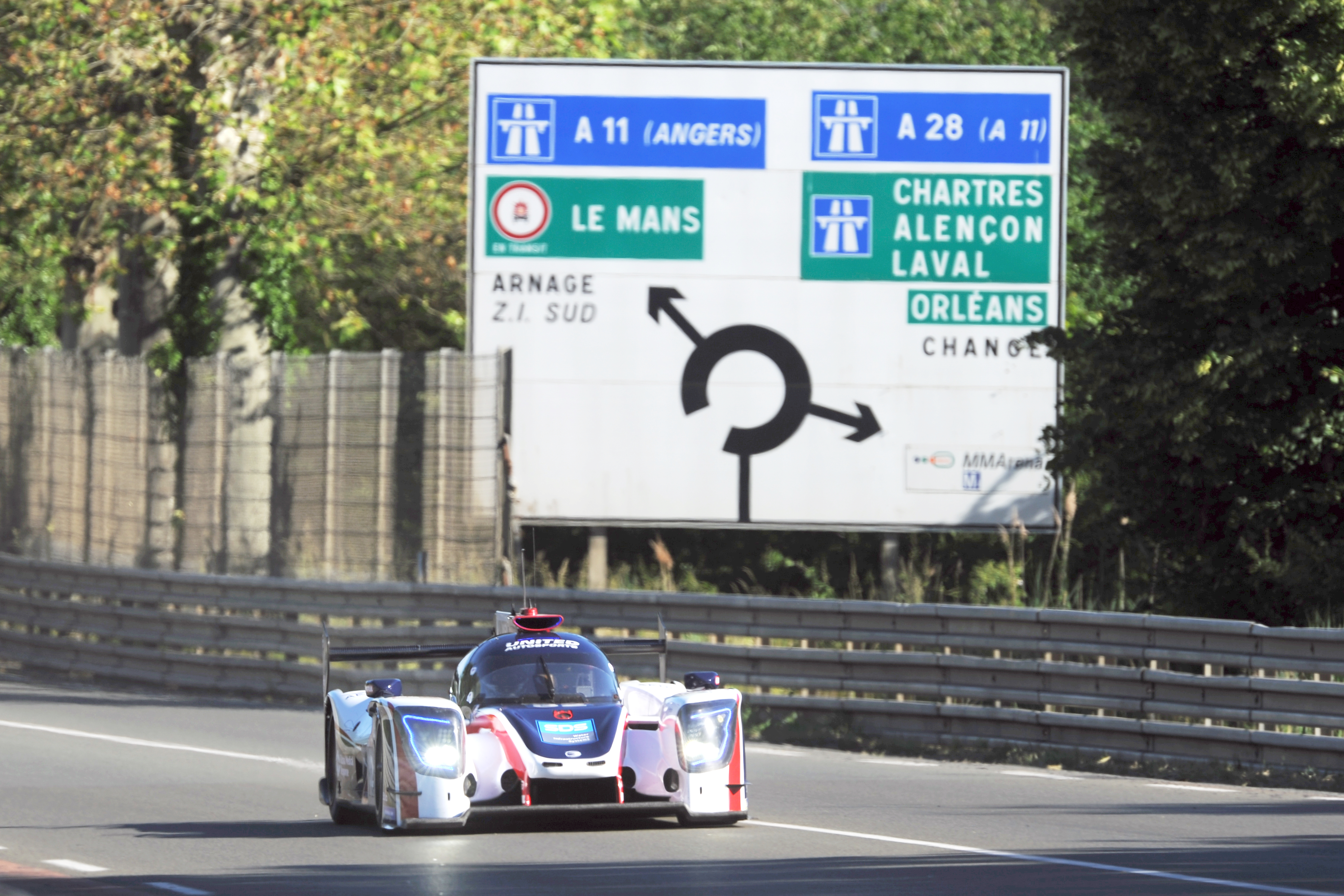
Part of the Mulsanne Straight

Le Mans was most famous for its 6 km (3.7 mi) long straight, called Ligne Droite des Hunaudières, a part of the route départementale (for the Sarthe département) D338 (formerly Route Nationale N138). As the Hunaudières leads to the village of Mulsanne, it is often called the Mulsanne Straight in English, even though the proper Route du Mulsanne is the one from or to Arnage.

After exiting the Tertre Rouge corner, cars spent almost half of the lap at full throttle, before braking for Mulsanne Corner. The Porsche 917 long tail, used from 1969 to 1971, had reached 362 km/h (225 mph). After engine size was limited, the top speed dropped until powerful turbo engines were allowed, like in the 1978 Porsche 935, which was clocked at 367 km/h (228 mph). Speeds on the straight by the Group C prototypes reached over 400 km/h (250 mph) during the late 1980s. At the beginning of the 1988 24 Hours of Le Mans race, Roger Dorchy driving for Welter Racing in a "Project 400" car, which sacrificed reliability for speed, was clocked by radar travelling at 407 km/h (253 mph). Jean-Louis Lafosse and Jo Gartner would ultimately suffer from fatal high speed accidents in 1981 and 1986, respectively, leading to concerns with the growing speeds on the 3.7 mi (6.0 km) straight.

As the combination of high speed and high downforce caused tyre and engine failures, two roughly equally spaced chicanes were consequently added to the Mulsanne Straight before the 1990 race to limit the maximum achievable speed. The chicanes were also added because the FIA decreed it would no longer sanction a circuit which had a straight longer than 2 km (1.2 mi), which is roughly the length of the Döttinger Höhe straight at the Nürburgring Nordschleife. The fastest qualifying lap average speed though only dropped from 249.826 to 243.329 km/h (155.235 to 151.198 mph) in 1992. In 1994, the Dunlop chicane was tightened.

In 2002, the run to the Esses was reconfigured in the wake of renovations to the Bugatti Circuit. The Le Mans circuit was changed between the Dunlop Bridge and Esses, with the straight now becoming a set of fast sweeping turns. This layout allowed for a better transition from the Le Mans circuit to the Bugatti circuit. This layout change would also require the track's infamous carnival to be moved near the Porsche curves, and in 2006, the ACO redeveloped the area between the Dunlop Curve and Tertre Rouge, moving the Dunlop Chicane in even tighter to create more run-off area, while also turning the area after the Dunlop Chicane into an even larger set of fast, sweeping turns, known as the Esses en route to Tertre Rouge. As part of the development, a new extended pit lane exit was created for the Bugatti Circuit. This second pit exit re-enters the track just beyond the Dunlop Chicane and before the Dunlop Bridge.

Following the fatal crash of Danish driver Allan Simonsen at the 2013 race at the exit of Tertre Rouge into D338, Tertre Rouge was re-profiled again. The radius was moved in approximately 200 m (220 yd) for safety reasons with new tyre barriers at the exit. The current version of the track has been in use since 2018.

For 2026, the old Dunlop Bridge switched to Goodyear branding.

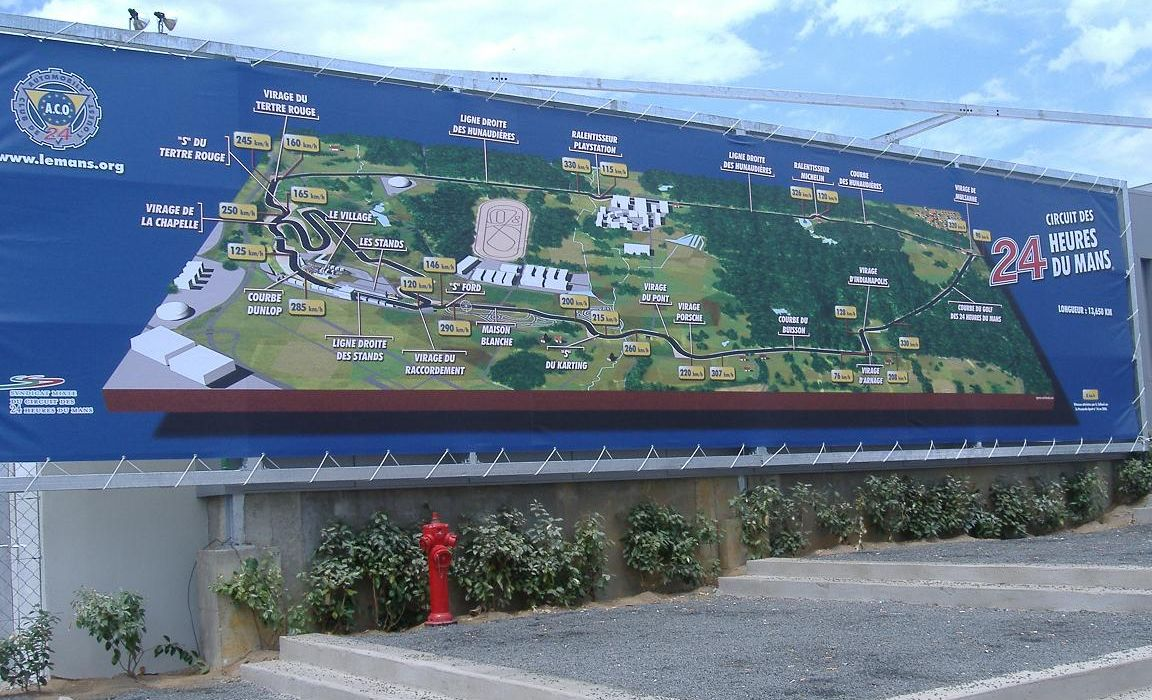
An on site map of the circuit

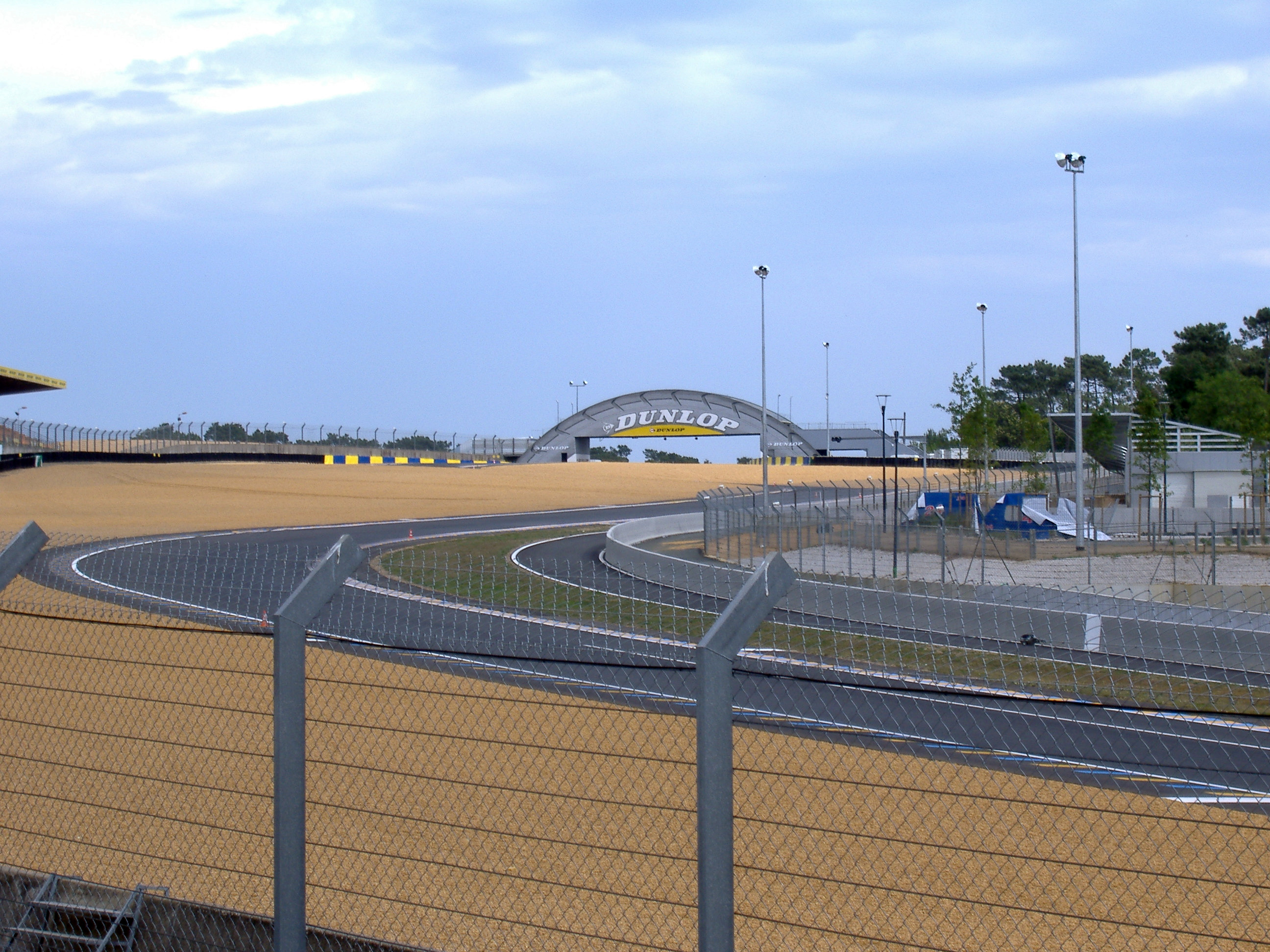
The area before the Dunlop bridge, modified for 2006

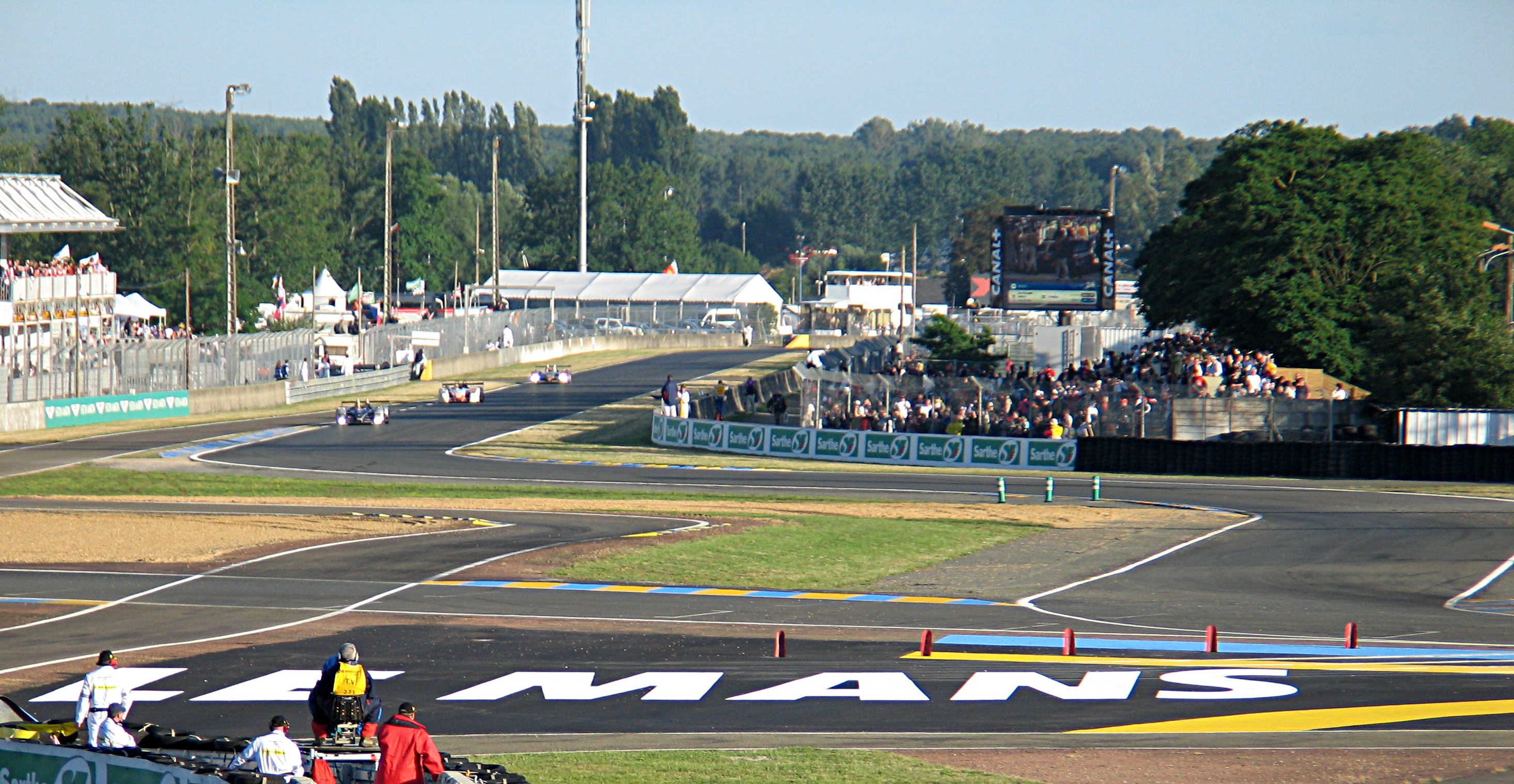
The Ford Chicanes

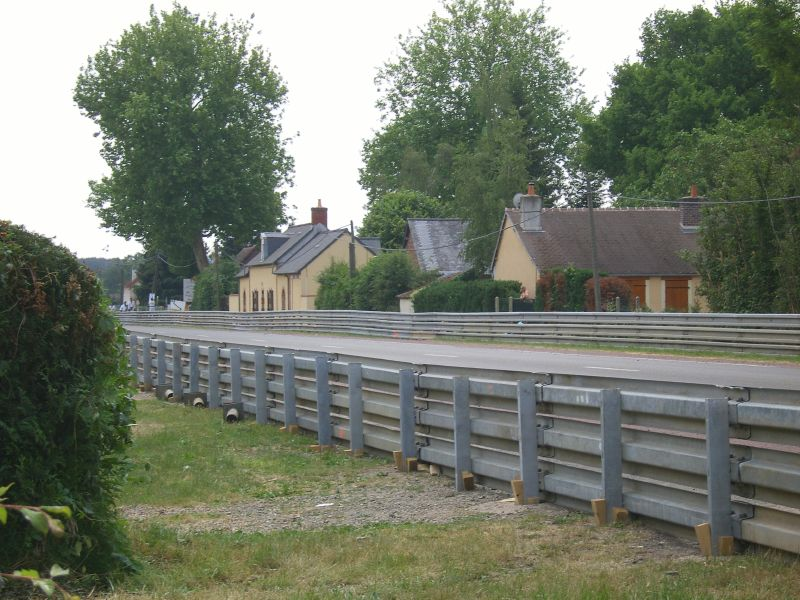
A large portion of the track still consists of Sarthe Route Départementale D338.

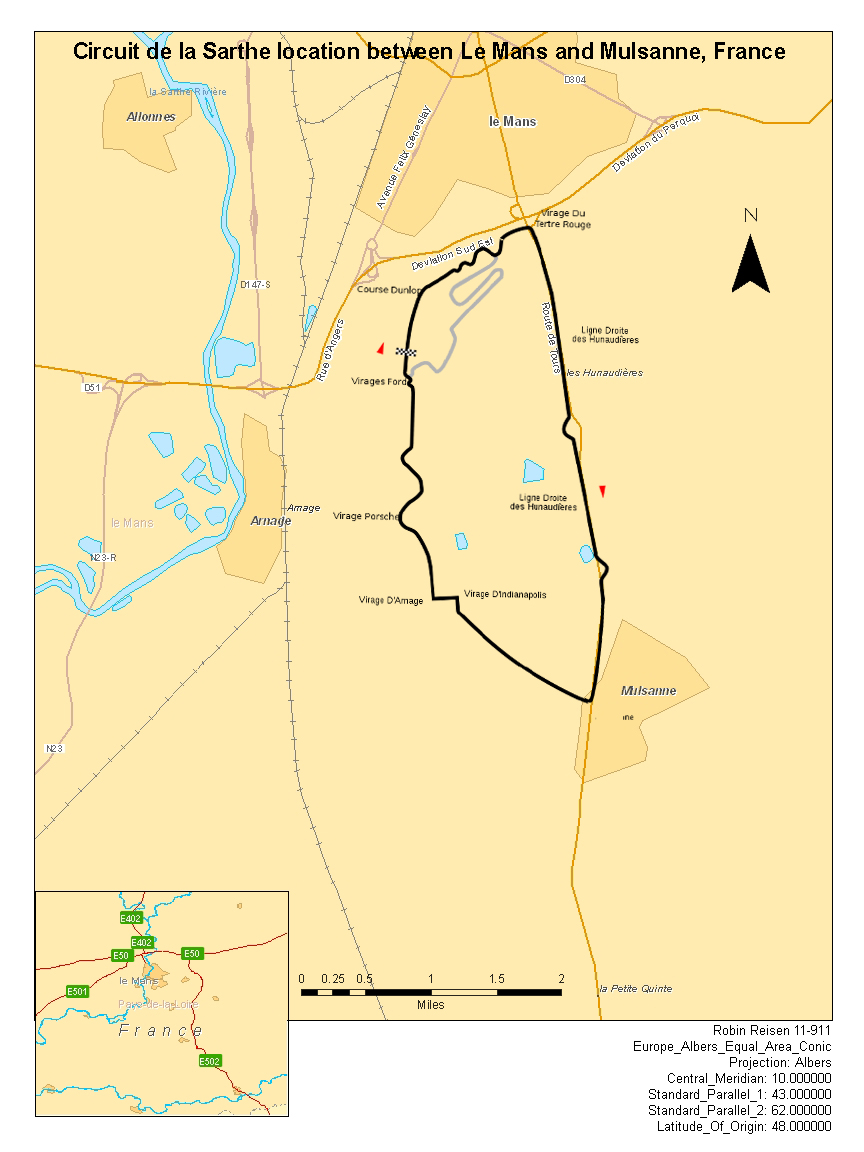
Circuit location between Le Mans and Mulsanne, France

=== Layout evolution of Circuit de la Sarthe ===
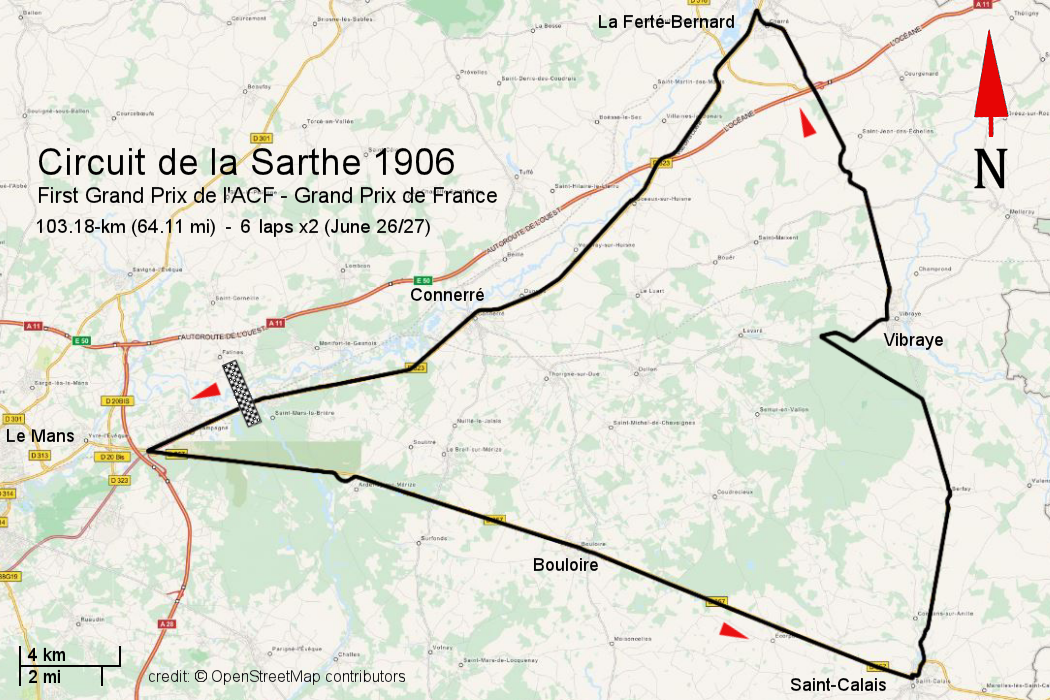
Circuit de la Sarthe (1906)

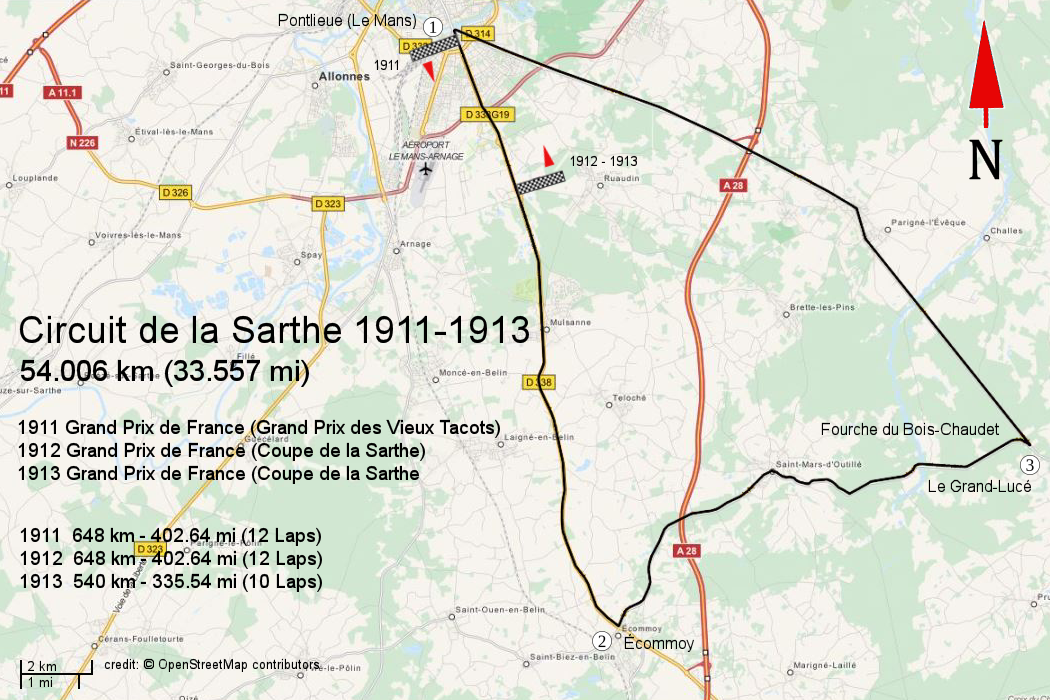
Circuit de la Sarthe (1911–1913)

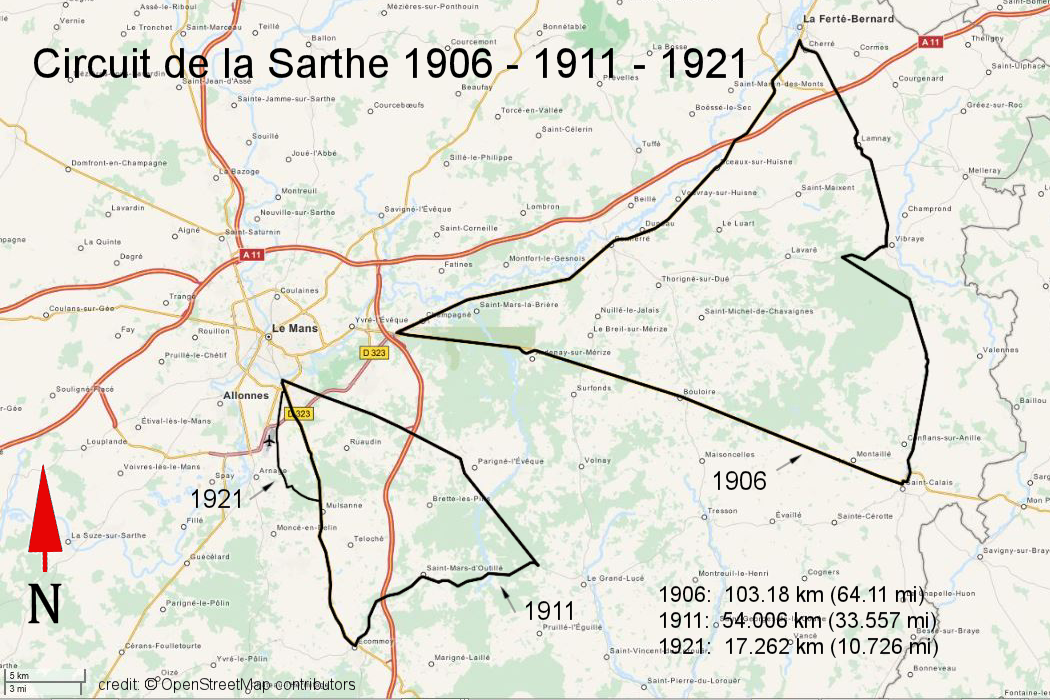
Comparison of Circuit de la Sarthe layouts between 1906 and 1921

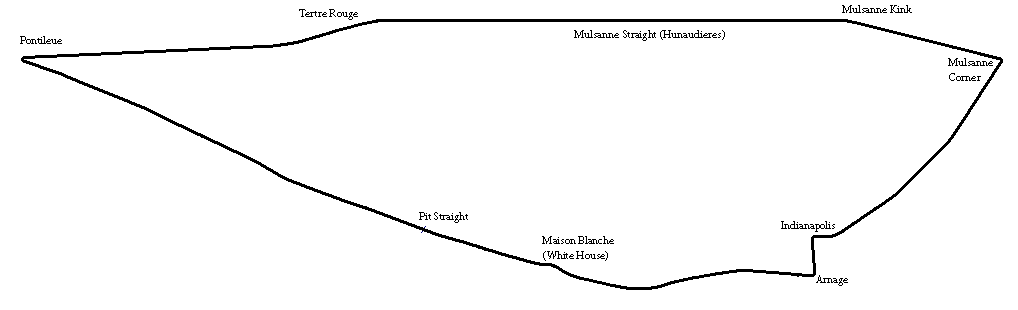
Circuit de la Sarthe (1921–1928)

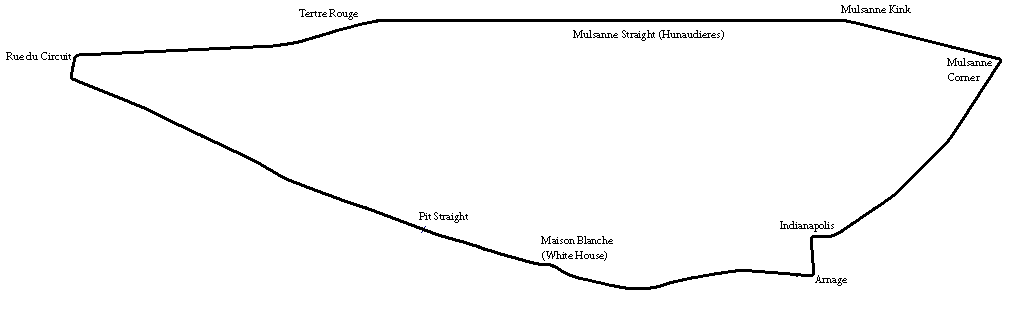
Circuit de la Sarthe (1929–1931)

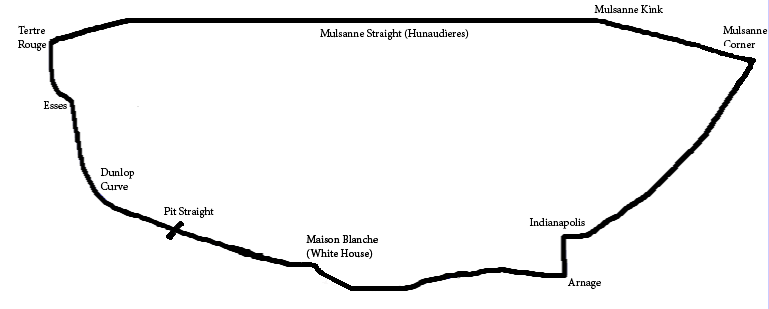
Circuit de la Sarthe (1932–1967)

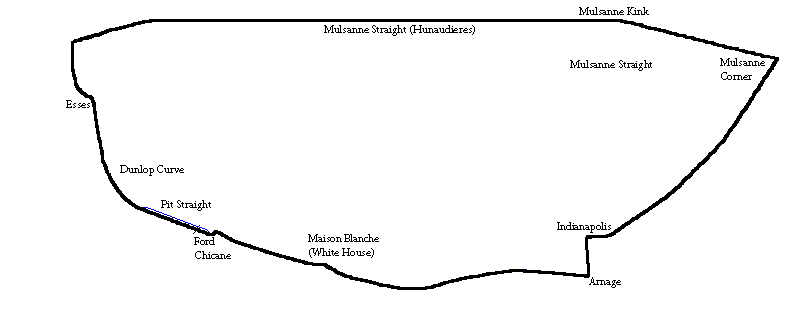
Circuit de la Sarthe (1968–1971)

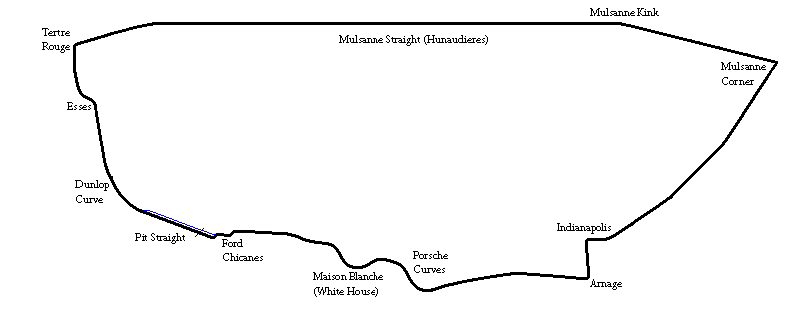
Circuit de la Sarthe (1972–1978)

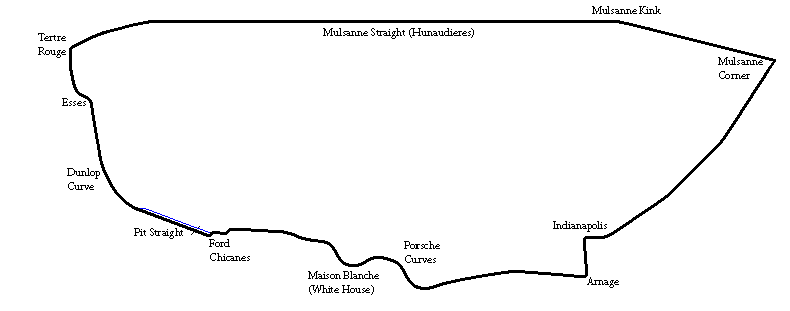
Circuit de la Sarthe (1979–1985)

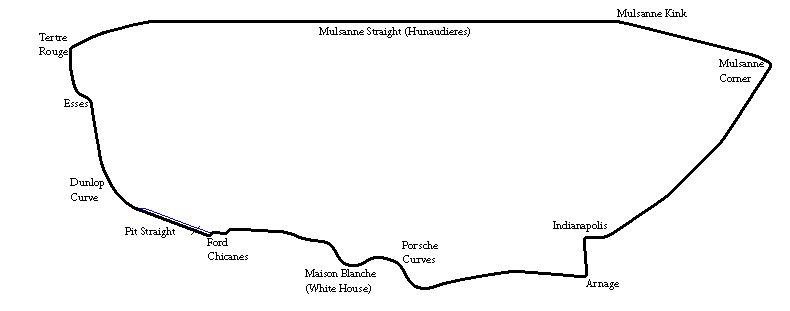
Circuit de la Sarthe (1986)

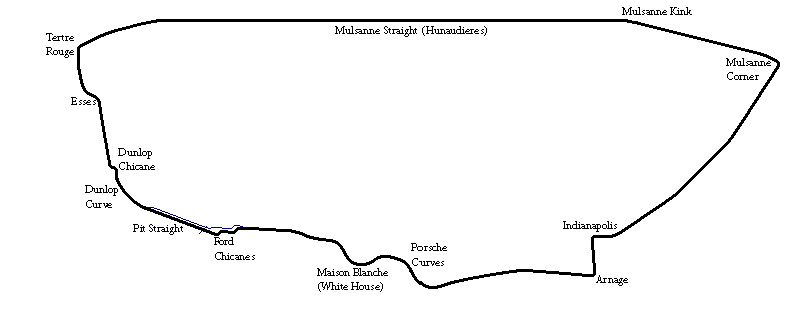
Circuit de la Sarthe (1987–1989)

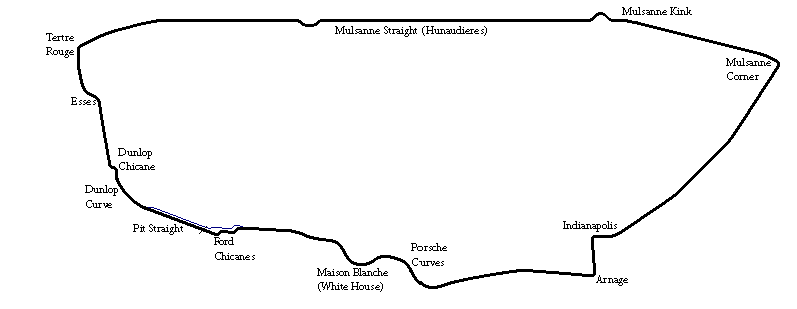
Circuit de la Sarthe (1990–2001)

Circuit de la Sarthe (2002–present)

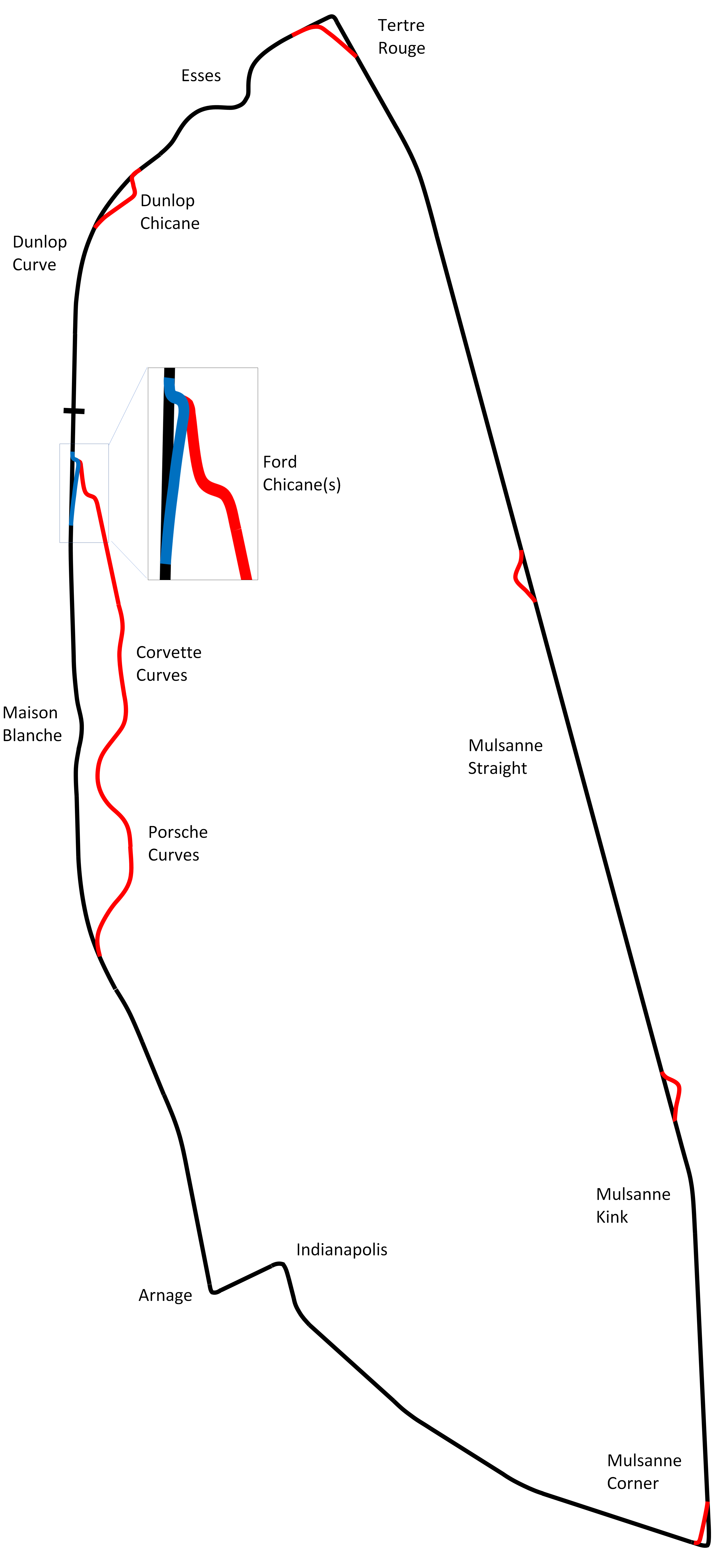
Layout evolution of Circuit de la Sarthe

== Lap records ==
Years	Record year	Distance record	Average race speed	Lap record (in race)	Driver – car	Lap record (qualifying)	Driver – car
Circuit N°1 – 17.262 km (10.726 mi)
1923–1928	1928	2,669.272 km (1,658.609 mi); Bentley 4½ Litre	111.219 km/h (69.108 mph)	8:07 (127.604 km/h (79.289 mph)) in 1928	H.Birkin; Bentley 4½ Litre		
Circuit N°2 – 16.340 km (10.153 mi)
1929–1931	1931	3,017.654 km (1,875.083 mi); Alfa Romeo 8C	125.735 km/h (78.128 mph)	6:48 (144.362 km/h (89.702 mph)) in 1930	H.Birkin; Bentley Blower		
Circuit N°3 – 13.492 km (8.384 mi)
1932–1955	1955	4,135.380 km (2,569.606 mi); Jaguar D	172.308 km/h (107.067 mph)	4:06.6 (196.963 km/h (122.387 mph)) in 1955	M.Hawthorn; Jaguar D		
Circuit N°4 – 13.461 km (8.364 mi)
1956–1967	1967	5,232.900 km (3,251.573 mi); Ford Mk IV	218.038 km/h (135.483 mph)	3:23.6 (238.014 km/h (147.895 mph)) in 1967	M.Andretti & D.Hulme; Ford Mk IV	3:24.04 (236.082 km/h (146.695 mph)) in 1967	B.McLaren; Ford Mk IV
Circuit N°5 – 13.469 km (8.369 mi)
1968–1971	1971	5,335.313 km (3,315.210 mi); Porsche 917	222.304 km/h (138.133 mph)	3:18.4 (244.397 km/h (151.861 mph)) in 1971	J.Oliver; Porsche 917	3:13.9 (250.069 km/h (155.386 mph)) in 1971	P. Rodríguez; Porsche 917
Circuit N°6 – 13.640 km (8.476 mi)
1972–1978	1978	5,044.530 km (3,134.526 mi); Alpine-Renault A442 B	210.189 km/h (130.605 mph)	3:34.2 (229.244 km/h (142.446 mph)) in 1978	J.P.Jabouille; Alpine-Renault A443	3:27.6 (236.531 km/h (146.974 mph)) in 1978	J.Ickx; Porsche 936
Circuit N°7 – 13.626 km (8.467 mi)
1979–1985	1985	5,088.507 km (3,161.852 mi); Porsche 956	212.021 km/h (131.744 mph)	3:25.1 (239.169 km/h (148.613 mph)) in 1985	J.Mass; Porsche 962	3:14.8 (251.815 km/h (156.471 mph)) in 1985	H.Stuck; Porsche 962
Circuit N°8 – 13.528 km (8.406 mi)
1986	1986	4,972.731 km (3,089.912 mi); Porsche 962 C	207.197 km/h (128.746 mph)	3:23.3 (239.551 km/h (148.850 mph)) in 1986	K.Ludwig; Porsche 956	3:15.99 (243.486 km/h (151.295 mph)) in 1986	J.Mass; Porsche 962 C
Circuit N°9 – 13.535 km (8.410 mi)
1987–1989	1988	5,332.790 km (3,313.642 mi); Jaguar XJR9	221.665 km/h (137.736 mph)	3:21.27 (242.093 km/h (150.430 mph)) in 1989	A.Ferté; Jaguar XJR9	3:15.04 (249.826 km/h (155.235 mph)) in 1989	J.L.Schlesser; Sauber Mercedes C9
Circuit N°10 – 13.600 km (8.451 mi)
1990–1996	1993	5,100.000 km (3,168.993 mi); Peugeot 905	213.358 km/h (132.575 mph)	3:27.47 (235.986 km/h (146.635 mph)) in 1993	E.Irvine; Toyota TS010	3:21.209 (243.329 km/h (151.198 mph)) in 1992	Ph.Alliot; Peugeot 905
Circuit N°11 – 13.605 km (8.454 mi)
1997–2001	2000	5,007.988 km (3,111.819 mi); Audi R8	208.666 km/h (129.659 mph)	3:35.032 (227.771 km/h (141.530 mph)) in 1999	U.Katayama; Toyota GT-One	3:29.93 (233.306 km/h (144.970 mph)) in 1999	M.Brundle; Toyota GT-One
Circuit N°12 – 13.650 km (8.482 mi)
2002–2005	2004	5,169.970 km (3,212.470 mi); Audi R8	215.415 km/h (133.853 mph)	3:33.483 (230.182 km/h (143.028 mph)) in 2002	T.Kristensen; Audi R8	3:29.905 (234.106 km/h (145.467 mph)) in 2002	R.Capello; Audi R8
Circuit N°13 – 13.650 km (8.482 mi)
2006	2006	5,187.000 km (3,223.052 mi); Audi R10 TDI	215.409 km/h (133.849 mph)	3:31.211 (232.658 km/h (144.567 mph)) in 2006	T.Kristensen; Audi R10 TDI	3:30.466 (233.482 km/h (145.079 mph)) in 2006	R.Capello; Audi R10 TDI
Circuit N°14 – 13.629 km (8.469 mi)
2007–2017	2010	5,410.713 km (3,362.061 mi); Audi R15 TDI plus	225.228 km/h (139.950 mph)	3:17.475 (248.459 km/h (154.385 mph)) in 2015	A.Lotterer; Audi R18 e-tron quattro	3:14.791 (251.882 km/h (156.512 mph)) in 2017	K. Kobayashi; Toyota TS050 Hybrid
Circuit N°15 - 13.626 km (8.467 mi)
Since 2018	2018	5,286.36 km (3,284.79 mi); Toyota TS050 Hybrid	220.015 km/h (136.711 mph)	3:17.297 (248.6 km/h (154.5 mph)) in 2019	M. Conway; Toyota TS050 Hybrid	3:15.267 (251.21 km/h (156.09 mph)) in 2020	K. Kobayashi; Toyota TS050 Hybrid

=== Fastest race laps of Circuit de la Sarthe ===
As of June 2026, the fastest official race lap records at the Circuit de la Sarthe for different classes are listed as:

Category	Time	Driver	Vehicle	Event
Circuit de la Sarthe (2018–present): 13.626 km (8.467 mi)
LMP1	3:17.297	Mike Conway	Toyota TS050 Hybrid	2019 24 Hours of Le Mans
LMH	3:25.041	Ryo Hirakawa	Toyota TR010 Hybrid	2026 24 Hours of Le Mans
LMDh	3:25.369	Will Stevens	Cadillac V-Series.R	2026 24 Hours of Le Mans
LMP2	3:27.200	Nathanaël Berthon	Oreca 07	2018 24 Hours of Le Mans
Garage 56	3:37.066	Matthieu Lahaye	Association SRT41	2021 24 Hours of Le Mans
LMP3	3:46.374	Laurents Hörr	Duqueine M30 D-08	2021 Road to Le Mans
LM GTE	3:47.501	Alexander Sims	Chevrolet Corvette C8.R	2021 24 Hours of Le Mans
Ferrari Challenge	3:53.703	Michael Verhagen	Ferrari 296 Challenge	2026 Le Mans Ferrari Challenge Europe round
GT3	3:53.802	Hadrien David	Lexus RC F GT3	2026 24 Hours of Le Mans
Lamborghini Super Trofeo	3:56.694	Amaury Bonduel	Lamborghini Huracán Super Trofeo Evo 2	2024 Le Mans Lamborghini Super Trofeo Europe round
NASCAR	3:59.773	Andrew Jordan	Toyota Camry	2026 Le Mans Classic
Porsche Carrera Cup	4:00.181	Alessandro Ghiretti	Porsche 911 (992 I) GT3 Cup	2023 Le Mans Porsche Carrera Cup France round
JS P4	4:05.688	Gillian Henrion	Ligier JS P4	2022 Le Mans Ligier European Series round
GT4	4:09.985	Julien Piguet	Porsche 718 Cayman GT4 Clubsport	2025 1st Le Mans Porsche Sprint Challenge France round
JS2 R	4:18.803	Hugo Rosati	Ligier JS2 R	2022 Le Mans Ligier European Series round
Mustang Challenge	4:19.559	Robert Noaker	Ford Mustang Dark Horse R	2025 Mustang Challenge Le Mans Invitational
Circuit de la Sarthe (2007–2017): 13.629 km (8.469 mi)
LMP1	3:17.475	André Lotterer	Audi R18	2015 24 Hours of Le Mans
LMP2	3:28.632	Ho-Pin Tung	Oreca 07	2017 24 Hours of Le Mans
Garage 56	3:45.737	Michael Krumm	DeltaWing	2012 24 Hours of Le Mans
GT1 (GTS)	3:48.969	Tomáš Enge	Aston Martin DBR9	2007 24 Hours of Le Mans
LMP3	3:50.576	Yann Ehrlacher	Norma M30	2017 Road to Le Mans
LM GTE	3:50.950	Daniel Serra	Aston Martin Vantage GT2	2017 24 Hours of Le Mans
GT3	3:56.040	Ben Barker	Porsche 911 (991) GT3 R	2017 Road to Le Mans
Porsche Carrera Cup	4:04.514	Kévin Estre	Porsche 911 (991 I) GT3 Cup	2014 Le Mans Porsche Cup
Ferrari Challenge	4:05.134	Jeff Segal	Ferrari 458 Challenge	2013 Le Mans Ferrari Challenge Europe round
Circuit de la Sarthe (2002–2006): 13.650 km (8.482 mi)
LMP1	3:31.211	Tom Kristensen	Audi R10 TDI	2006 24 Hours of Le Mans
LMP900	3:33.483	Tom Kristensen	Audi R8	2002 24 Hours of Le Mans
LMGTP	3:35.529	Johnny Herbert	Bentley Speed 8	2003 24 Hours of Le Mans
LMP2	3:35.883	William Binnie	Lola B05/40	2006 24 Hours of Le Mans
LMP675	3:37.221	Mark Blundell	MG-Lola EX257	2002 24 Hours of Le Mans
GT1 (GTS)	3:51.422	Darren Turner	Aston Martin DBR9	2005 24 Hours of Le Mans
GT2	4:04.426	Romain Dumas	Porsche 911 (996) GT3-RSR	2006 24 Hours of Le Mans
GT2	4:06.306	Sascha Maassen	Porsche 911 (996) GT3 RSR	2004 24 Hours of Le Mans
Circuit de la Sarthe (1997–2001): 13.605 km (8.454 mi)
LMGTP	3:35.032	Ukyo Katayama	Toyota GT-One	1999 24 Hours of Le Mans
LMP900	3:37.359	Allan McNish	Audi R8	2000 24 Hours of Le Mans
GT1 (Prototype)	3:41.809	Martin Brundle	Toyota GT-One	1998 24 Hours of Le Mans
LMP675	3:52.156	Jean-Christophe Boullion	Reynard 2KQ	2000 24 Hours of Le Mans
GT1 (GTS)	3:58.862	Ron Fellows	Chevrolet Corvette C5-R	2000 24 Hours of Le Mans
GT	4:16.660	Christophe Bouchut	Porsche 911 (996) GT3-R	2000 24 Hours of Le Mans
Circuit de la Sarthe (1990–1996): 13.600 km (8.451 mi)
Group C1	3:27.470	Eddie Irvine	Toyota TS010	1993 24 Hours of Le Mans
WSC	3:46.958	Eric van de Poele	Ferrari 333 SP	1996 24 Hours of Le Mans
IMSA GTP	3:47.330	Volker Weidler	Mazda 787	1990 24 Hours of Le Mans
GT1	3:48.778	Yannick Dalmas	Porsche 911 GT1	1996 24 Hours of Le Mans
LMP2	3:51.410	Patrick Gonin	WR LM94	1995 24 Hours of Le Mans
Group C2	3:58.270	Charles Zwolsman	Spice SE90C	1990 24 Hours of Le Mans
GT2	4:12.074	Ralf Kelleners	Porsche 911 (993) GT2	1996 24 Hours of Le Mans
Circuit de la Sarthe (1987–1989): 13.535 km (8.410 mi)
Group C1	3:21.270	Alain Ferté	Jaguar XJR-9	1989 24 Hours of Le Mans
IMSA GTP	3:28.520	Takashi Yorino	Mazda 767B	1989 24 Hours of Le Mans
Group C2	3:41.730	Nick Adams	Spice SE89C	1989 24 Hours of Le Mans
Circuit de la Sarthe (1986): 13.528 km (8.406 mi)
Group C1	3:23.300	Klaus Ludwig	Porsche 956B	1986 24 Hours of Le Mans
Circuit de la Sarthe (1979–1985): 13.626 km (8.467 mi)
Group C1	3:25.100	Jochen Mass	Porsche 962C	1985 24 Hours of Le Mans
Group 6	3:34.000	Hurley Haywood	Porsche 936/81	1981 24 Hours of Le Mans
IMSA GTP	3:36.600	Bob Tullius	Jaguar XJR-5	1985 24 Hours of Le Mans
Group C2	3:47.700	David Leslie	Ecosse C285	1985 24 Hours of Le Mans
Group B	4:02.300	Harald Grohs	BMW M1	1985 24 Hours of Le Mans
IMSA GTO	4:13.300	Jean-Marie Alméras	Porsche 930	1984 24 Hours of Le Mans
Circuit de la Sarthe (1972–1978): 13.640 km (8.476 mi)
Group 6	3:34.200	Jean-Pierre Jabouille	Renault Alpine A443	1978 24 Hours of Le Mans
Group 5	3:39.600	François Cevert	Matra-Simca MS670B	1973 24 Hours of Le Mans
Circuit de la Sarthe: 13.469 km (1968–1971)
Group 5	3:18.400	Jackie Oliver	Porsche 917L	1971 24 Hours of Le Mans
Group 6	3:38.100	Rolf Stommelen	Porsche 908	1968 24 Hours of Le Mans
Circuit de la Sarthe (1956–1967): 13.461 km (8.364 mi)
Group 4	3:23.600	Mario Andretti (Note: Both drivers took the same lap time independently.); Denny Hulme	Ford GT40 Mk IV	1967 24 Hours of Le Mans
Circuit de la Sarthe (1932–1955): 13.492 km (8.384 mi)
Sports prototype	4:06.600	Mike Hawthorn	Jaguar D-Type	1955 24 Hours of Le Mans
Circuit de la Sarthe (1929–1931): 16.340 km (10.153 mi)
Sports prototype	6:48.000	Henry Birkin	Bentley Blower	1930 24 Hours of Le Mans
Circuit de la Sarthe (1923–1928): 17.262 km (10.726 mi)
Sports prototype	8:07.000	Henry Birkin	Bentley 4½ Litre	1928 24 Hours of Le Mans

== Speed record ==
In 1988, Team WM Peugeot were well aware of their slim chance of winning the 24-hour endurance race outright, but they knew that their Welter Racing designed car had exceptional straight line aerodynamics. Thus they nicknamed their 1988 entry "Project 400" (aiming to be the first car to achieve a speed of 400 km/h (250 mph) on the famous straight), although the official team entry was named WM Secateva.

Roger Dorchy and Claude Haldi would be the drivers of car 51 while Pascal Pessiot and Jean-Daniel Raulet would drive the team's other car (#52). The latter lasted only 22 laps, and car 51 went into the pits around 17:00 in the afternoon with engine problems. After spending 3.5 hours in the pits, the team had the car back on the track and they decided to go for it. The plan worked: with Roger Dorchy behind the wheel the WM P87 achieved the speed of 407 km/h (253 mph). The Peugeot retired shortly after that (on lap 59) with an overheating engine. By then it had outlasted two other Group C1 entrants.

Since Peugeot had just launched its new model 405, the team agreed to advertise the new record as "405". This has led to many people mistakenly stating the record as only 405 km/h (252 mph), but Dorchy's best run down the Mulsanne straight was clocked at 407 km/h (253 mph).

== Bugatti Circuit ==
Bugatti Circuit
- Bugatti Circuit Bugatti Circuit (2002–present)
- Location: Le Mans, Pays de la Loire, France
- FIA Grade: 2 (Bugatti)
- Owner: Automobile Club de l'Ouest; Ville du Mans
- Operator: Automobile Club de l'Ouest
- Opened: 1965
- Major events: Current: Grand Prix motorcycle racing French motorcycle Grand Prix (1969–1970, 1976, 1979, 1983, 1985, 1987, 1989–1990, 1994–1995, 2000–present); Vitesse du Mans motorcycle Grand Prix (1991); FIM EWC; 24 Hours of Le Mans Moto (1978–present); ETRC; 24 Heures Camions Le Mans (2003–present); Sidecar World Championship (1969–1970, 1976, 1979, 1983, 1985, 1987, 1989–1991, 1995, 2007–2019, 2021–2022, 2024–present); Former: World SBK (1988, 1990); DTM (2006, 2008); World Series by Renault (2005–2006, 2008–2009, 2015); F3000 (1986–1991); Formula One French Grand Prix (1967)
- Website: http://www.lemans.org/en/

Bugatti Circuit (2002–present)
- Surface: Tarmac
- Length: 4.185 km (2.600 mi)
- Turns: 14
- Race lap record: 1:22.981 ( (France) Matthieu Vaxivière, Dallara T12, 2015, FR 3.5)

Bugatti Circuit (1989–2001)
- Length: 4.430 km (2.753 mi)
- Turns: 11
- Race lap record: 1:33.210 ( (France) Philippe Gache, Lola T89/50, 1990, F3000)

Bugatti Circuit (1986–1988)
- Length: 4.240 km (2.635 mi)
- Turns: 11
- Race lap record: 1:29.200 ( (Italy) Emanuele Pirro, March 86B, 1986, F3000)

Bugatti Circuit (1965–1985)
- Length: 4.422 km (2.748 mi)
- Turns: 8
- Race lap record: 1:36.620 ( (France) Pierre Petit, Martini MK31, 1981, F3)

Bugatti Circuit is a 4.185 km (2.600 mi) permanent race track located within Circuit des 24 Heures, constructed in 1965 and named after Ettore Bugatti. The circuit uses a part of the larger circuit and a separate, purpose-built section. The sections of track on the Bugatti Circuit that are on the Circuit des 24 Heures include the Ford Chicane at the end of the lap, the pit complex, and the straight where the Dunlop Tyres bridge is located. At this point in the overlapping section of the tracks there is a left-right sweep that was added for motorcycle safety in 2002. Vehicles turning to the left continue onto the Circuit des 24 Heures, toward Tertre Rouge and Mulsanne, vehicles turning to the right at La Chapelle will continue the Bugatti Circuit. The infield section features Garage Vert, a back straight, the 'S' du Garage Bleu, and Raccordement, which joins back at the Ford chicane.

The track was home base for Pescarolo Sport, founded by famous French driver Henri Pescarolo. The circuit currently hosts the 24 Hours of Le Mans motorcycle race, and a round of the MotoGP Championship. The circuit also holds French motor club races and in the past has hosted rounds of the International Formula 3000 Championship and DTM (German Touring Car series).

In addition to motor racing, it is the venue for the 24 rollers, a 24h race on inline skates or quads.

The Bugatti Circuit was used for the 1967 French Grand Prix, though it would prove to be the only time the Formula One World Championship would use the circuit, and is the current host of the French motorcycle Grand Prix. It also forms the final round of the FIA European Truck Racing Championship, and was part of the World Series by Renault and 1988 Superbike World Championship seasons.

=== Fastest race laps of Bugatti Circuit ===
As of May 2026, the fastest official race lap records at the Bugatti Circuit are listed as:

Category	Time	Driver	Vehicle	Event
Bugatti Circuit (2002–present): 4.185 km (2.600 mi)
Formula Renault 3.5	1:22.981	Matthieu Vaxivière	Dallara T12	2015 Le Mans Formula Renault 3.5 Series round
Formula One	1:26.367	Earl Goddard	Benetton B194	2002 Le Mans EuroBOSS round
LMP900	1:30.518	Tom Kristensen	Audi R8	2003 1000 km of Le Mans
DTM	1:30.713	Mika Häkkinen	AMG-Mercedes C-Klasse 2006	2006 Le Mans DTM round
Formula Three	1:30.946	Nico Hülkenberg	Dallara F308	2008 Le Mans F3 Euro Series round
MotoGP	1:31.107	Enea Bastianini	Ducati Desmosedici GP24	2024 French motorcycle Grand Prix
LMP3	1:31.139	Julian Kuwabara Wagg	Ligier JS P320	2021 Le Mans Ultimate Cup round
Sports prototype	1:31.843	Colin White	Ginetta G57	2016 Le Mans V de V Endurance Series round
Renault Sport Trophy	1:33.503	Pieter Schothorst	Renault Sport R.S. 01	2015 Le Mans Renault Sport Trophy round
Formula Renault 2.0	1:33.846	Martin Kodrić	Tatuus FR2.0/13	2015 Le Mans Eurocup Formula Renault 2.0 round
LMP675	1:34.380	Jon Field	Lola B01/60	2003 1000 km of Le Mans
Moto2	1:34.455	Iván Ortolá	Kalex Moto2	2026 French motorcycle Grand Prix
GT3	1:35.166	Bernard Delhez	Renault R.S. 01 GT3	2021 Le Mans Ultimate Cup round
Superbike	1:35.207	Hugo Clere	Honda CBR1000RR	2026 Le Mans French Superbike round
GT1 (Prototype)	1:35.236	David Saelens	Panoz Esperante GTR-1	2003 1000 km of Le Mans
Formula 4	1:37.250	Arthur Dorison	Mygale M21-F4	2025 Le Mans French F4 round
250cc	1:37.594	Randy de Puniet	Aprilia RSV 250	2005 French motorcycle Grand Prix
GT1 (GTS)	1:38.530	Darren Turner	Ferrari 550 Maranello	2003 1000 km of Le Mans
Supersport	1:39.035	Valentin Debise	Yamaha YZF-R6	2022 Le Mans French Supersport round
MotoE	1:39.736	Andrea Mantovani	Ducati V21L	2025 French motorcycle Grand Prix
Porsche Carrera Cup	1:40.232	Mathieu Jaminet	Porsche 911 (991 I) GT3 Cup	2016 Le Mans Porsche Carrera Cup France round
Moto3	1:40.838	Álvaro Carpe	KTM RC250GP	2025 French motorcycle Grand Prix
Eurocup Mégane Trophy	1:41.853	Dimitri Enjalbert	Renault Mégane Renault Sport	2009 Le Mans Eurocup Mégane Trophy round
GT	1:42.011	Andrea Montermini	Ferrari 360 Modena GTC	2003 1000 km of Le Mans
Formula Renault 1.6	1:42.201	Joey Mawson	Signatech FR 1.6	2014 Le Mans French F4 round
Silhouette racing car	1:42.335	Soheil Ayari	Peugeot 406 Coupé	2004 Le Mans French Supertouring round
125cc	1:42.651	Andrea Dovizioso	Honda RS125R	2004 French motorcycle Grand Prix
Stock car racing	1:45.816	Ander Vilariño	Chevrolet SS	2014 Le Mans NASCAR Whelen Euro Series round
Supersport 300	1:52.502	Adrien Quinet	Kawasaki Ninja 400	2021 Le Mans French Supersport 300 round
Truck racing	2:02.794	Norbert Kiss	MAN TGS	2015 Le Mans ETRC round
Bugatti Circuit (1989–2001): 4.430 km (2.753 mi)
F3000	1:33.210	Philippe Gache	Lola T89/50	1990 Le Mans F3000 round
Formula Three	1:37.806	Ryō Fukuda	Dallara F399	2001 Le Mans French F3 round
WSC	1:37.954	Emmanuel Collard	Ferrari 333 SP	1998 Le Mans Autumn Cup
500cc	1:39.954	Max Biaggi	Yamaha YZR500	2001 French motorcycle Grand Prix
250cc	1:41.473	Daijiro Kato	Honda NSR250	2001 French motorcycle Grand Prix
Formula Renault 2.0	1:43.005	Éric Salignon	Tatuus FR2000	2001 Le Mans French Formula Renault round
GT1 (GTS)	1:44.739	Dominique Dupuy	Chrysler Viper GTS-R	2001 Le Mans FFSA GT round
World SBK	1:46.210	Jamie James	Ducati 851	1990 Le Mans World SBK round
GT1	1:47.620	Carl Rosenblad	Ferrari F40 GTE	1995 4 Hours of Le Mans Autumn Cup
125cc	1:47.766	Lucio Cecchinello	Aprilia RS125R	2001 French motorcycle Grand Prix
Porsche Carrera Cup	1:48.200	Timo Bernhard	Porsche 911 (996 I) GT3 Cup	2000 Le Mans Porsche Carrera Cup Germany round
Silhouette racing car	1:48.783	Jean-Philippe Dayraut	Opel Astra Coupé Silhouette	2000 Le Mans French Supertouring round
Bugatti Circuit (1986–1988): 4.240 km (2.635 mi)
F3000	1:29.200	Emanuele Pirro	March 86B	1986 Le Mans F3000 round
Formula Three	1:37.640	Yannick Dalmas	Martini MK49	1986 Le Mans French F3 round
World SBK	1:56.790	Fabrizio Pirovano	Yamaha FZ750	1988 Le Mans World SBK round
500cc	1:59.290	Randy Mamola	Yamaha YZR500	1987 French motorcycle Grand Prix
Bugatti Circuit (1965–1985): 4.422 km (2.748 mi)
Formula Three	1:36.620	Pierre Petit	Martini MK31	1981 Le Mans French F3 round
Formula One	1:36.700	Graham Hill	Lotus 49	1967 French Grand Prix
500cc	1:37.500	Freddie Spencer	Honda NS500	1983 French motorcycle Grand Prix
Formula Renault 2.0	1:42.550	Philippe Alliot	Martini MK20	1978 Le Mans French Formula Renault round
250cc	1:43.600	Kork Ballington	Kawasaki KR250	1979 French motorcycle Grand Prix
350cc	1:44.600	Walter Villa	Harley-Davidson RR350	1976 French motorcycle Grand Prix
Formula Two	1:45.000	Denny Hulme	Brabham BT18	1966 Trophée Craven 'A'
125cc	1:49.700	Ángel Nieto	Minareli 125cc GP	1979 French motorcycle Grand Prix
Sidecar (B2A)	1:52.800	Rolf Biland	Yamaha sidecar	1976 French motorcycle Grand Prix
50cc	2:11.200	Rudolf Kunz	Kreidler 50 GP	1976 French motorcycle Grand Prix

=== Layout evolution of Bugatti Circuit ===
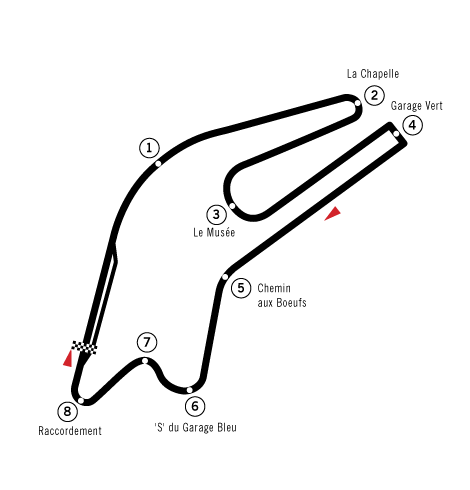
Bugatti Circuit (1965–1985)

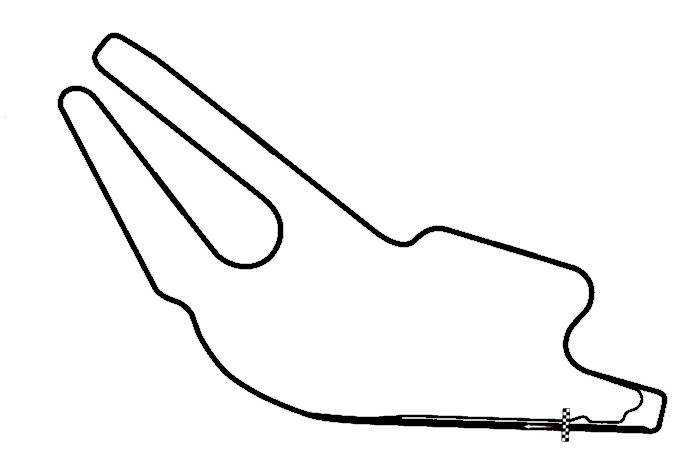
Bugatti Circuit (1989–1996)

Bugatti Circuit (2002–present)

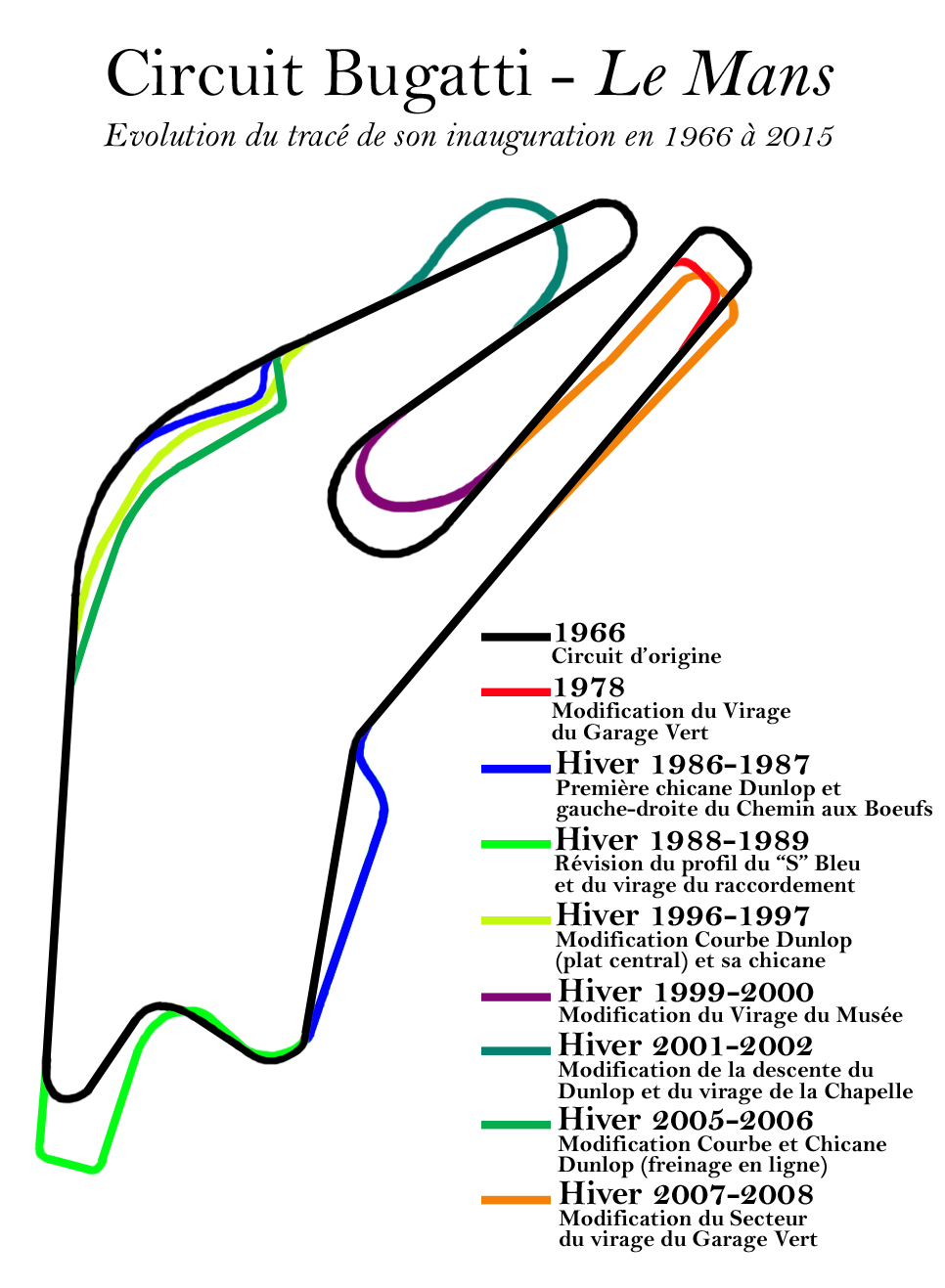
Layout evolution of Bugatti circuit from 1965 to 2008

== Events ==
Current

- March: Fun Cup France
- April: FIM Endurance World Championship 24 Heures Motos, Sidecar World Championship, French Superbike Championship
- May: Grand Prix motorcycle racing French motorcycle Grand Prix, Red Bull MotoGP Rookies Cup
- June: FIA World Endurance Championship 24 Hours of Le Mans, Le Mans Cup, Ligier European Series, Ferrari Challenge Europe, Porsche Cup Brasil
- July: Le Mans Classic Le Mans Classic Legend, GT3 Revival Series
- September: European Truck Racing Championship 24 Heures Camions, Porsche Sprint Challenge France, British Truck Racing Championship

Future

- Harley-Davidson Bagger World Cup (2027)
- McLaren Trophy Europe (2027)

Former

- Deutsche Tourenwagen Masters (2006, 2008)
- EuroBOSS Series (2002–2004)
- Eurocup Formula Renault 2.0 (1995, 1998, 2005–2006, 2008–2009, 2015)
- Eurocup Mégane Trophy (2005–2006, 2008–2009)
- Ferrari Challenge North America (2023)
- FIM CEV Moto3 Junior World Championship (2014–2019)
- FFSA GT Championship (1998–1999, 2001–2006, 2012–2015)
- Formula 3 Euro Series (2003, 2006, 2008)
- Formula One
  - French Grand Prix (Bugatti Circuit) (1967)
- Formula Renault 2.0 West European Cup (1971–1972, 1975–2006, 2008–2009)
- Formula Renault 3.5 Series (2005–2006, 2008–2009, 2015)
- French F4 Championship (2012–2016, 2025)
- French Formula Three Championship (1966–1967, 1980–1981, 1986–2002)
- French Supertouring Championship (1976, 1978–1981, 1986, 1989–1994, 1998–2005)
- GP Explorer (2022–2023, 2025)
- Grand Prix motorcycle racing
  - Vitesse du Mans motorcycle Grand Prix (1991)
- IMSA Ford Mustang Challenge
  - Mustang Challenge Le Mans Invitational (2025)
- International Formula 3000 (1986–1991)
- International Sports Racing Series (1998)
- Lamborghini Super Trofeo Europe (2024)
- MotoE World Championship
  - French eRace (2020–2025)
- NASCAR Whelen Euro Series (2009–2014)
- Porsche Carrera Cup Benelux (2017)
- Porsche Carrera Cup France (1987, 1989–2000, 2002–2005, 2010–2011, 2013–2017, 2020, 2023)
- Porsche Carrera Cup Germany (2000, 2006, 2020)
- Porsche Carrera Cup Great Britain (2014, 2017)
- Porsche Carrera Cup Scandinavia (2023)
- Renault Sport Trophy (2015)
- Superbike World Championship (1988, 1990)

== Weather and climate ==
Météo France runs a weather station in Le Mans, which exhibits an oceanic climate (Köppen Cfb). With both the 24-hour races and the French MotoGP round being run before the peak of summer, high-profile races often have cool temperatures both in terms of ambient and track conditions with rainfall being a potential factor. Although nights cool off, sometimes into the single digits, during the 24-hour car race, air frosts have never been recorded in June. The weather station is located at the local airport just a few hundred metres from the main grandstand and pit lane of the circuit.

Climate data for Le Mans (1991–2020 averages)
Month	Jan	Feb	Mar	Apr	May	Jun	Jul	Aug	Sep	Oct	Nov	Dec	Year
Record high °C (°F)	17.2 (63.0)	21.8 (71.2)	25.6 (78.1)	30.3 (86.5)	32.4 (90.3)	39.7 (103.5)	41.1 (106.0)	40.5 (104.9)	35.0 (95.0)	30.0 (86.0)	22.2 (72.0)	18.3 (64.9)	41.1 (106.0)
Mean maximum °C (°F)	14.4 (57.9)	16.2 (61.2)	20.4 (68.7)	24.8 (76.6)	28.2 (82.8)	32.4 (90.3)	33.9 (93.0)	34.0 (93.2)	29.2 (84.6)	23.5 (74.3)	17.6 (63.7)	14.3 (57.7)	35.4 (95.7)
Mean daily maximum °C (°F)	8.4 (47.1)	9.7 (49.5)	13.3 (55.9)	16.6 (61.9)	20.1 (68.2)	23.6 (74.5)	26.0 (78.8)	26.0 (78.8)	22.2 (72.0)	17.2 (63.0)	11.9 (53.4)	8.8 (47.8)	17.0 (62.6)
Daily mean °C (°F)	5.5 (41.9)	5.9 (42.6)	8.7 (47.7)	11.3 (52.3)	14.9 (58.8)	18.2 (64.8)	20.3 (68.5)	20.1 (68.2)	16.7 (62.1)	13.0 (55.4)	8.6 (47.5)	5.9 (42.6)	12.4 (54.4)
Mean daily minimum °C (°F)	2.7 (36.9)	2.2 (36.0)	4.0 (39.2)	6.0 (42.8)	9.7 (49.5)	12.9 (55.2)	14.6 (58.3)	14.3 (57.7)	11.2 (52.2)	8.8 (47.8)	5.2 (41.4)	2.9 (37.2)	7.9 (46.2)
Mean minimum °C (°F)	−6.1 (21.0)	−5.1 (22.8)	−3.0 (26.6)	−0.6 (30.9)	2.7 (36.9)	6.8 (44.2)	8.8 (47.8)	7.7 (45.9)	4.5 (40.1)	0.8 (33.4)	−2.8 (27.0)	−5.2 (22.6)	−8.0 (17.6)
Record low °C (°F)	−18.2 (−0.8)	−17.0 (1.4)	−11.3 (11.7)	−4.9 (23.2)	−3.7 (25.3)	1.6 (34.9)	3.9 (39.0)	3.2 (37.8)	−0.5 (31.1)	−5.4 (22.3)	−12.0 (10.4)	−21.0 (−5.8)	−21.0 (−5.8)
Average precipitation mm (inches)	65.9 (2.59)	49.1 (1.93)	52.2 (2.06)	51.1 (2.01)	63.2 (2.49)	55.1 (2.17)	49.4 (1.94)	49.0 (1.93)	50.8 (2.00)	65.5 (2.58)	67.1 (2.64)	75.0 (2.95)	693.4 (27.29)
Average precipitation days	11.0	9.6	9.4	9.0	9.5	7.9	7.3	7.1	7.7	10.6	11.3	11.6	112
Average relative humidity (%)	87	83	78	74	75	73	72	74	79	86	88	88	79.8
Mean monthly sunshine hours	65	94	139	180	207	221	233	226	185	118	75	67	1,810
Source 1: Meteo France
Source 2: Infoclimat (humidity 1961–1990)
