= 1966 Trophée Craven 'A' =

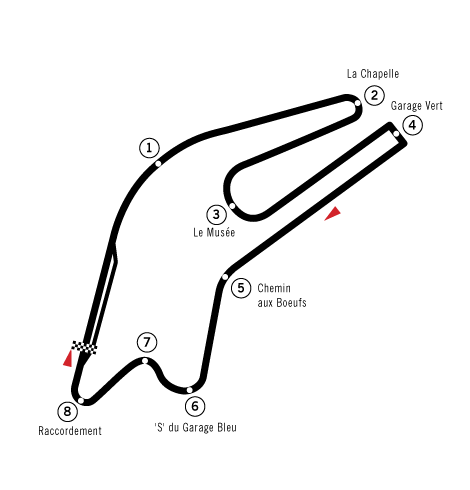
Bugatti au Mans (1966-1985)

The Trophée Craven 'A', was the fifth round of the 1966 Trophées de France. This was held on the Bugatti au Mans, located in Le Mans, Maine, France, on 18 September. The following July, the circuit was home to the 1967 French Grand Prix, of which all three drivers on the podium that afternoon – Jack Brabham, Denny Hulme and Jackie Stewart – raced in this event.

== Report ==
=== Entry ===
Despite the continued domination by the Brabham Racing Developments team, a total of 22 F2 cars were entered for the event. However, five cars did not arrive for qualifying.

=== Qualifying ===
Jack Brabham took pole position for the Brabham Racing Developments team, in a Brabham-Cosworth BT21, averaging a speed of 94.007 mph, around the 4.4 kilometres (2.7 mi) course.

=== Race ===
The race was held over 60 laps of the Le Mans Bugatti Circuit. Denny Hulme took the winner's spoils for the works Brabham team, driving their Brabham-Honda BT18. Hulme won in a time of 1hr 47:27.8mins., averaging a speed of 91.590 mph. Around 42 seconds behind was the second place car, driven by Frenchman, Jean-Pierre Beltoise, for the Matra Sports team in their Cosworth powered Matra MS5. The podium was completed by the second Frenchman, Eric Offenstadt, in a Lotus 44 of Ron Harris – Team Lotus, albeit one lap down.

== Classification ==
=== Race result ===
Pos.	No.	Driver	Entrant	Car - Engine	Time, Laps	Reason Out
1st	4	(New Zealand) Denny Hulme	Brabham Racing Developments	Brabham-Honda BT18	1hr 47:27.8	
2nd	18	(France) Jean-Pierre Beltoise	Matra Sport	Matra-Cosworth MS5	1hr 48:19.8	
3rd	10	(France) Eric Offenstadt	Ron Harris - Team Lotus	Lotus-Cosworth 44	59	
4th	14	(United Kingdom) Jackie Stewart	Tyrrell Racing Organisation	Matra-Cosworth MS5	59	
5th	38	(United Kingdom) Richard Attwood	Midland Racing Partnership	Lola-Cosworth T61	58	
6th	6	(United Kingdom) Jim Clark	Ron Harris - Team Lotus	Lotus-Cosworth 44	55	
DNF	8	(United Kingdom) Peter Arundell	Ron Harris - Team Lotus	Lotus-Cosworth 44	50	fuel injection
DNF	24	(Austria) Jochen Rindt	Roy Winkelmann Racing	Brabham-Cosworth BT18	38	Throttle linkage
DNF	12	(United Kingdom) Graham Hill	John Coombs	Matra-BRM MS5	25	Camshaft
DNF	16	(Belgium) Jacky Ickx	Tyrrell Racing Organisation	Matra-BRM MS5	22	Electrical
DNF	40	(France) Jean Guichet	Eric Offenstadt	Lola-BRM T60	8	Piston
DNF	2	(Australia) Jack Brabham	Brabham Racing Developments	Brabham-Cosworth BT21	5	Engine
DNF	20	(France) Jo Schlesser	Matra Sports	Matra-Cosworth MS5	3	Gearbox
DNF	30	(United Kingdom) Bob Anderson	Bob Gerard – Cooper Racing	Cooper-Cosworth T82	0	Accident
DNF	36	(United Kingdom) David Hobbs	Midland Racing Partnership	Lola-Cosworth T60	0	Accident
DNF	26	(United Kingdom) Alan Rees	Roy Winkelmann Racing	Brabham-Cosworth BT18	0	Accident
DNF	28	(United Kingdom) Trevor Taylor	Aurora Gear Racing	Brabham-Cosworth BT16	0	Accident

- Fastest lap: Hulme, 1:45.0ecs. (93.738 mph)
