= 1966 Trophées de France season =

1966 Trophées de France

Seasons
- ← 1965 1967 →

The 1966 Trophées de France season was the 3rd season of the Trophées de France. The season was totally dominated by Brabham. Despite winning the World Championship for Drivers, Jack Brabham found time to win four of the six races to win this title as well. This was done, driving for his own team, Brabham Racing Organisation, piloting either a Brabham BT18, or a BT21. The others two races were won by Denny Hulme, also for racing for the Brabham Racing Organisation team. For the record, the Brabham marque also took third in the drivers standing with Roy Winkelmann Racing's, Alan Rees.

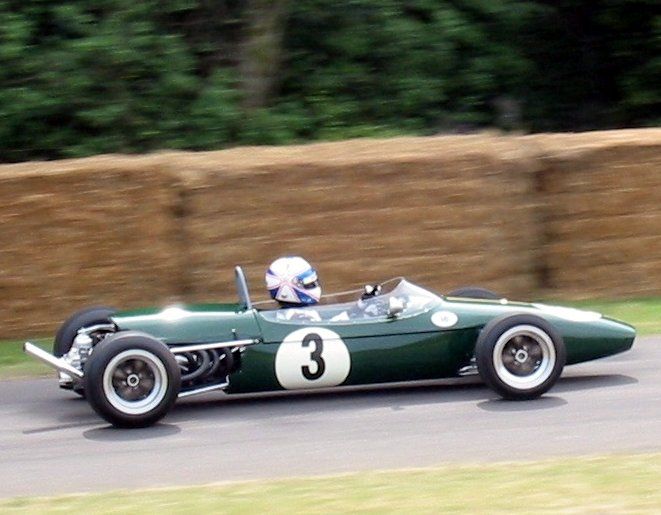
Brabham-Honda BT18 as used during the 1966 season, pictured at the 2005 Goodwood Festival of Speed

== Trophées de France ==
Champion: (Australia) Jack Brabham

Runner Up: (New Zealand) Denny Hulme

=== Results ===
#	Date	Name	Circuit	Winning driver	Winning team	Winning car
1	17/04	Grand Prix du Pau	(France) Pau	(Australia) Jack Brabham	Brabham Racing Organisation	Brabham-Honda BT18
2	03/07	Grand Prix de Reims	(France) Reims	(Australia) Jack Brabham	Brabham Racing Organisation	Brabham-Honda BT18
3	10/07	Grand Prix de Rouen-les-Essarts	(France) Rouen-Les-Essarts	(New Zealand) Denny Hulme	Brabham Racing Development	Brabham-Honda BT18
4	11/09		(France) Montlhéry	(Australia) Jack Brabham	Brabham Racing Organisation	Brabham-Honda BT21
5	18/09	Trophée Craven A	(France) Le Mans-Bugatti	(New Zealand) Denny Hulme	Brabham Racing Development	Brabham-Honda BT18
6	25/09	Grand Prix de l'Albi	(France) Albi	(Australia) Jack Brabham	Brabham Racing Organisation	Brabham-Honda BT21
	Source:					

=== Table ===
Place	Driver	Entrant	Car	Total
1	(Australia) Jack Brabham	Brabham Racing Organisation	Brabham-Honda BT18; Brabham-Honda BT21; Brabham-Cosworth BT21	36
2	(New Zealand) Denny Hulme	Brabham Racing Organisation	Brabham-Honda BT18; Brabham-Cosworth BT18	28
3	(United Kingdom) Alan Rees	Roy Winkelmann Racing	Brabham-Cosworth BT18	14
4	(France) Jean-Pierre Beltoise	Matra Sports	Matra-BRM MS5; Matra-Cosworth MS5	10
5	(United Kingdom) Jackie Stewart	Tyrrell Racing Organisation	Matra-BRM MS5; Matra-Cosworth MS5	8
6=	(United Kingdom) Jim Clark	Ron Harris – Team Lotus	Lotus-Cosworth 35; Lotus-Cosworth 44	6
6=	(France) Jo Schlesser	Matra Sports	Matra-BRM MS5; Matra-Cosworth MS5	6
8	(France) Eric Offenstadt	Eric Offenstadt; Ron Harris – Team Lotus	Lola-BRM MS5; Lotus-Cosworth 44	6
9=	(United Kingdom) Graham Hill	John Coombs	Brabham-BRM BT61; Matra-Cosworth MS5	5
9=	(Belgium) Jacky Ickx	Tyrrell Racing Organisation	Matra-BRM MS5	5
11=	(Mexico) Pedro Rodríguez	Ron Harris – Team Lotus; Matra Sport	Lotus-Cosworth 44; Matra-BRM MS5	4
11=	(United Kingdom) Chris Irwin	Brabham Racing Organisation	Brabham-Honda BT18	4
13	(United Kingdom) Richard Attwood	Midland Racing Partnership	Lola-Cosworth T61	4
14=	(Germany) Kurt Ahrens Jr.	Caltex Racing Team	Brabham-Cosworth BT18	3
14=	(United Kingdom) Mike Spence	Ron Harris – Team Lotus	Lotus-Cosworth 44	3
16	(Australia) Frank Gardner	Midland Racing Partnership	Lola-Cosworth T60; Lola-Cosworth T61	2
