= Pilbeam MP93 =

Sports prototype race car

Pilbeam MP93 Pilbeam MP100
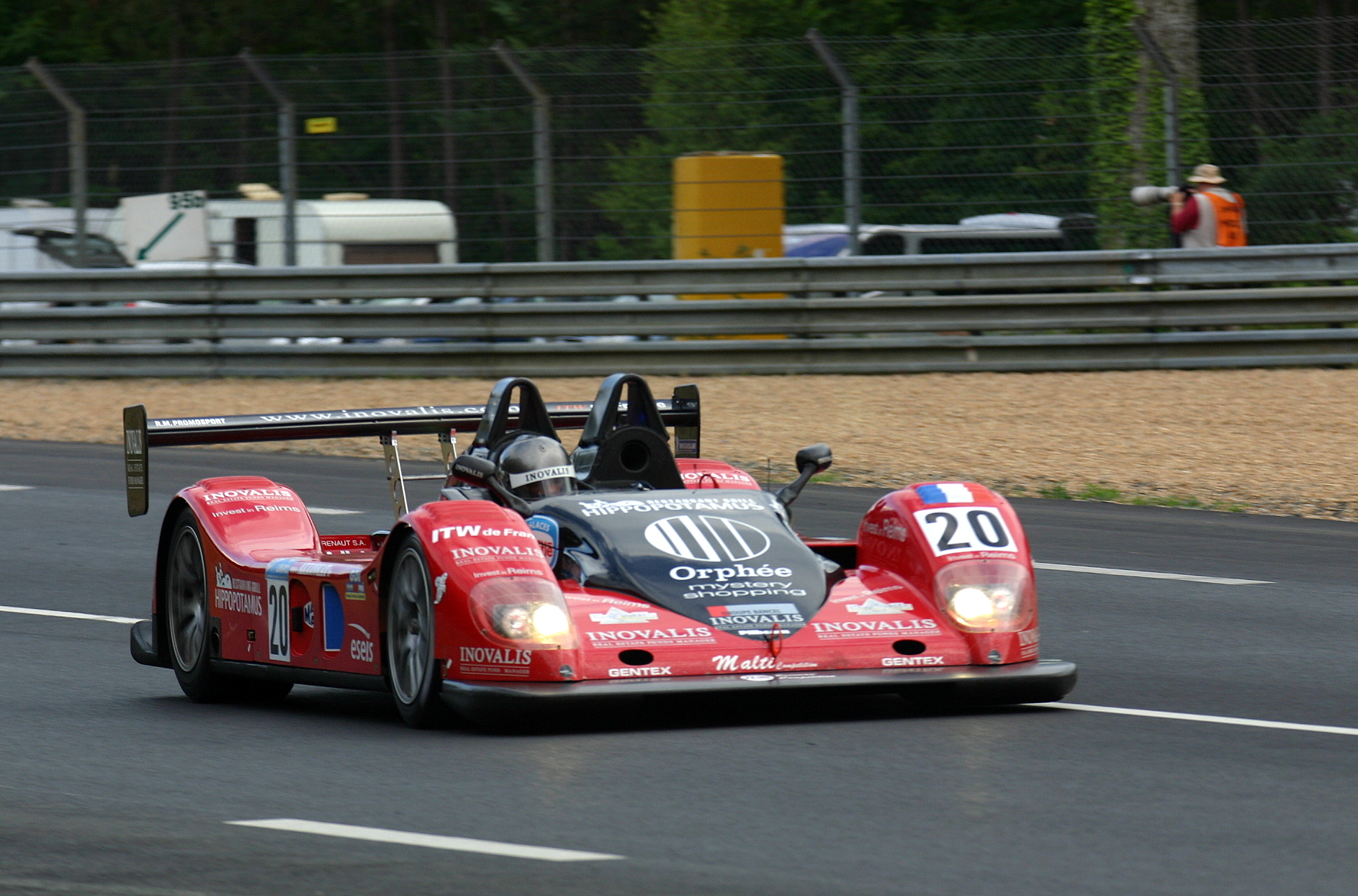
- Category: LMP2
- Designer(s): Mike Pilbeam, Peter Bowes, Jon Gardam
- Predecessor: Pilbeam MP91

Technical specifications
- Chassis: Carbon fiber and aluminum honeycomb monocoque chassis, steel roll hoop
- Suspension: Unequal length wishbones, pushrod actuated coil springs over shock absorbers, inboard rocker arms
- Length: 4,584 mm (180.5 in)
- Width: 1,990 mm (78 in)
- Wheelbase: 2,854 mm (112.4 in)
- Engine: JPX Mader Willman 6 3.4 L (207.5 cu in) 120° DOHC V6 naturally-aspirated mid-engined Judd XV675 3.4 L (207.5 cu in) 90° DOHC V8 naturally-aspirated mid-engined Mountune-Ford 2.0 L (122.0 cu in) DOHC I4 turbocharged mid-engined
- Transmission: Hewland NMT 6-speed sequential
- Power: 520–580 hp (390–430 kW)
- Weight: 725–775 kg (1,598–1,709 lb)

Competition history
- Debut: 2005 24 Hours of Le Mans

The Pilbeam MP93, and its direct evolution, the Pilbeam MP100, are sports prototype race cars, designed, developed, and built by British manufacturer Pilbeam, for sports car racing, conforming to LMP2 class rules and regulations, and produced between 2005 and 2014. It is an evolution of the previous MP84.
