= 1967 Trophées de France season =

1967 Trophées de France

Seasons
- ← 1966 none →

The 1967 Trophées de France season was the fourth and final season of the Trophées de France Formula 2 championship. The season was dominated by Jochen Rindt, winning three out of the four events, driving a Brabham BT23-Cosworth for the Roy Winkelmann Racing team. In the fourth race of the season, Rindt finished second to Jackie Stewart's Matra MS7-Cosworth.

== Trophées de France ==
Champion: (Austria) Jochen Rindt

Runner Up: (United Kingdom) Jackie Stewart

=== Results ===
Round	Date	Event	Circuit	Winning driver	Winning team	Winning car
1	2 April	XXVII Grand Prix Automobile de Pau	Pau	(Austria) Jochen Rindt	Roy Winkelmann Racing	Brabham BT23-Cosworth
2	25 June	XXXIII Grand Prix de Reims	Reims-Gueux	(Austria) Jochen Rindt	Roy Winkelmann Racing	Brabham BT23-Cosworth
3	9 July	XV Grand Prix de Rouen	Rouen-Les-Essarts	(Austria) Jochen Rindt	Roy Winkelmann Racing	Brabham BT23-Cosworth
4	26 September	XXVI Grand Prix d'Albi	Circuit d'Albi	(United Kingdom) Jackie Stewart	Matra International	Matra MS7-Cosworth

=== Table ===
Place	Driver	Entrant	Car	Total
1	(Austria) Jochen Rindt	Roy Winkelmann Racing	Brabham BT16-Cosworth	33
2	(United Kingdom) Jackie Stewart	Matra International	Matra MS5-Cosworth; Matra MS7-Cosworth	12
3	(United Kingdom) Graham Hill	Team Lotus	Lotus 48-Cosworth	9
4	(New Zealand) Denis Hulme	Motor Racing Developments	Brabham BT23-Cosworth	8
5	(United Kingdom) Jim Clark	Ron Harris - Team Lotus	Lotus 35-Cosworth	7
6	(New Zealand) Bruce McLaren	Bruce McLaren Motor Racing	McLaren M4A-Cosworth	6
7	(United Kingdom) Alan Rees	Roy Winkelmann Racing	Brabham BT23-Cosworth	6
8	(Belgium) Jacky Ickx	Matra International	Matra MS5-Cosworth; Matra MS7-Cosworth	5
9=	(United Kingdom) John Surtees	Lola Racing	Lola T100-Cosworth	4
9=	(France) Jo Schlesser	Ford France	Matra MS5-Cosworth	4
11	(United Kingdom) Chris Irwin	Lola Racing	Lola T100-Cosworth	2
