= WR LM94 =

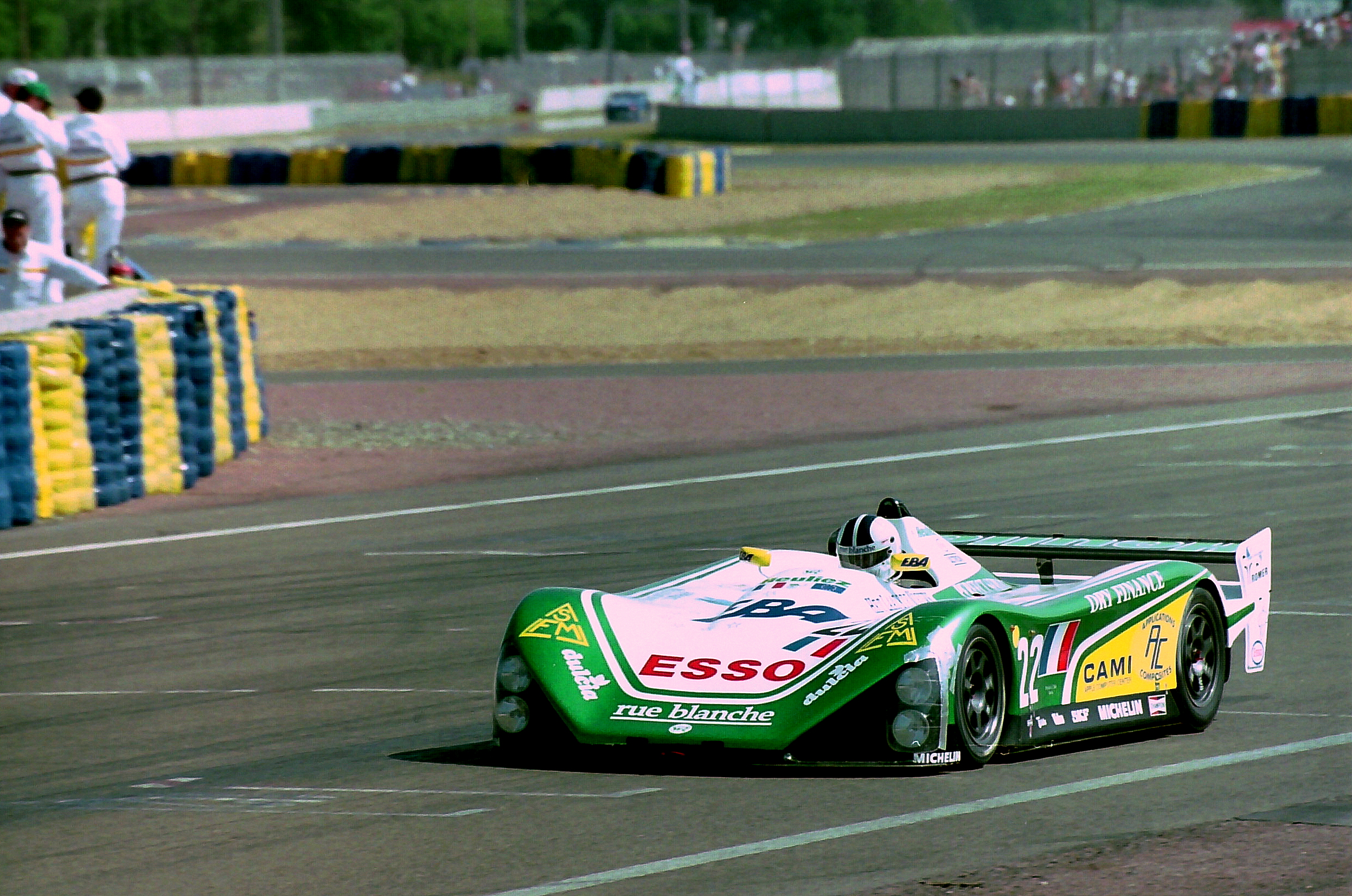
WR LM94

The WR LM94, and its evolutions, the WR LM95, and the WR LM96, were a series of prototype sports car, designed, developed, built, and used by Welter Racing in the 1994 and 1995 24 Hours of Le Mans.

== Development ==
The WR LM94 was the successor to the WR LM93. Like its predecessor, the LM94 was developed and built according to the LMP2 regulations of the Le Mans prototypes. The car had a Spyder body and was powered by Peugeot's 2-liter V6 turbocharged engine. The connection between Welter Racing and the French automobile manufacturer has existed since the 1970s. As a Peugeot designer, team boss Gérard Welter had excellent relationships with the company's board of directors. The car was highly flat for an LMP prototype. The rear wing was pulled across the vehicle's entire width and mounted very low.

== Racing history ==
At the 1994 Le Mans 24 Hours, an LM94 was used alongside the LM93. The car was driven by Hervé Regout, Jean-François Yvon and Jean-Paul Libert . In qualifying, the trio set the tenth fastest time, almost 8 seconds slower than Alain Ferté, who put his Courage C32 on pole. In the race, the team had problems with the turbocharger right from the start, which led to engine failure after 86 laps.

In 1995, the Group C cars at Le Mans were finally history. In a field made up almost entirely of GT cars, the LM94s were the fastest cars. Welter was known for building fast, low-downforce vehicles for the fast sections of the Circuit des 24 Heures. However, these cars were always filigree and prone to defects; Finishing at the 24-hour race was the exception. In 1995 both LM94s were on the front row. William David, who shared the #9 car with Bernard Bouvet and Richard Balandras, set the fastest lap time of 3m46.050s. Piloted the number 8 car Patrick Gonin, Pierre Petit, and Marc Rostan. Patrick Gonin took the lead right from the start and kept it until the first refueling stop after 10 laps. Half a lap shortly after the go-ahead, Welter even had a double lead, then William David was driven by Bob Wollek in the Courage C36relegated to third place. Both cars suffered the same technical problem early in the race and fell back in the overall standings. Pierre Petit, who had taken over the number 8 from Gonin, had to pit after 1½ hours to have the power transmission changed. Although the Welter pit crew acted very quickly, the car lost three laps. The journey of the prototype ended after a severe accident at nightfall. When it started to rain, he lost air at the last spot in front of the Mulsanne, rolled over once, and hit hard on all four sides of the right-hand side of the track. The accident was that of Peter Dumbreck in 1999, very similar but is not nearly as well known, which is mainly due to the fact that there are no television pictures of it. Patrick Gonin, who was driving the car, suffered severe bruises and several broken ribs in the accident. He had to spend a night in the hospital.

The car of David/Bouvet/Balandras, which came into the pits for the first time after just three laps to have the windshield taped in place, also had a problem with the power transmission after an hour's driving. After that, the car ran without complaint until 8 a.m., when the fuel pump went on strike and the team had to give up.

In 1996 the two chassis were sold to private teams. In 1995 the pole position was still achieved with the cars, but in 1996 there was no longer any possibility of qualifying the vehicles for the 24-hour race without further development.
