= 1964 International Gold Cup =

Race details
- Date: 19 September 1964
- Official name: XI International Gold Cup
- Location: Oulton Park, Cheshire
- Course: Permanent racing facility
- Course length: 4.4434 km (2.761 miles)
- Distance: 40 laps, 177.736 km (108.4 miles)

Pole position
Driver	(Australia) Jack Brabham	Brabham
- Time: 1:43.6

Fastest lap
Driver	(United Kingdom) Jim Clark	Lotus
- Time: 1:43.0

Podium
First	(Australia) Jack Brabham	Brabham
Second	(United Kingdom) Jim Clark	Lotus
Third	(United Kingdom) Jackie Stewart	Lotus

The 11th International Gold Cup was a Formula Two motor race, held on 19 September 1964 at Oulton Park, Cheshire. The race was run over 40 laps of the circuit, and was won from pole position by Jack Brabham in a Brabham BT10. Jim Clark in a Lotus 32 finished just two tenths of a second behind Brabham, setting fastest lap. Jackie Stewart was third in another Lotus 32.

== Results ==
Pos	No.	Driver	Entrant	Constructor	Time/Retired	Grid
1	5	(Australia) Jack Brabham	Brabham Racing Developments	Brabham BT10-Cosworth SCA	1:09:23.0	1
2	1	(United Kingdom) Jim Clark	Ron Harris Team Lotus	Lotus 32-Cosworth SCA	+0.2s	4
3	2	(United Kingdom) Jackie Stewart	Ron Harris Team Lotus	Lotus 32-Cosworth SCA	+1:06.4	11
4	3	(United Kingdom) Mike Spence	Ron Harris Team Lotus	Lotus 32-Cosworth SCA	+1 lap	12
5	22	(Australia) Paul Hawkins	John Willment Automobiles	Lola T55-Cosworth SCA	+1 lap	14
6	16	(United Kingdom) David Prophet	David Prophet Racing	Brabham BT10-Cosworth SCA	+1 lap	13
7	24	(United Kingdom) John Taylor	F.R. Gerard Racing	Cooper T71/73-Cosworth MAE	+3 laps	17
Ret	14	(United Kingdom) Alan Rees	Roy Winkelmann Racing	Brabham BT10-Cosworth SCA	35 laps, tappet	6
Ret	9	(United Kingdom) Richard Attwood	Midland Racing Partnership	Lola T55-Cosworth SCA	34 laps, tappet	10
Ret	4	(United Kingdom) Graham Hill	John Coombs	Brabham BT10-Cosworth SCA	31 laps, engine	2
Ret	6	(New Zealand) Denny Hulme	Brabham Racing Developments	Brabham BT10-Cosworth SCA	19 laps, suspension	3
Ret	15	(United Kingdom) David Hobbs	Merlyn Racing	Merlyn Mk.5-Cosworth SCA	17 laps, tappet	7
Ret	8	(South Africa) Tony Maggs	Midland Racing Partnership	Lola T54-Cosworth SCA	11 laps, tappet	9
Ret	23	(United Kingdom) Brian Hart	Cosworth Engineering Ltd.	Brabham BT10-Cosworth SCA	10 laps, accident	8
Ret	20	(United Kingdom) Rodney Bloor	Sports Motors (Manchester)	Lotus 32-Cosworth SCA	8 laps, tappet	15
Ret	11	(Austria) Jochen Rindt	Ford Motor Company (Austria)	Brabham BT10-Cosworth SCA	6 laps, clutch	5
Ret	21	(Australia) Frank Gardner	John Willment Automobiles	Brabham BT10-Cosworth SCA	0 laps, accident	16
DNA	7	(New Zealand) Chris Amon	Midland Racing Partnership	Lola T54-Cosworth SCA		
DNA	17	(United Kingdom) Syd Fox	David Prophet Racing	Brabham BT10-Cosworth SCA		
DNA	12	(France) Jacques Maglia	Jacques Maglia	Brabham BT10-Cosworth SCA		
DNA	18	(United Kingdom) Mike Beckwith	Normand Racing Team Ltd.	Cooper T71-Cosworth SCA		
DNA	19	(United Kingdom) Tony Hegbourne	Normand Racing Team Ltd.	Cooper T71-Cosworth SCA		
