= 1966 International Gold Cup =

- Non-championship race in the 1966 Formula One season

Race details
- Date: 17 September 1966
- Official name: XIII Gold Cup
- Location: Oulton Park, Cheshire
- Course: Permanent racing facility
- Course length: 4.4434 km (2.761 miles)
- Distance: 40 laps, 177.736 km (108.4 miles)

Pole position
Driver	(Australia) Jack Brabham	Brabham-Repco
- Time: 1:34.2

Fastest lap
Drivers	(Australia) Jack Brabham	Brabham-Repco
	(New Zealand) Denny Hulme	Brabham-Repco
- Time: 1:36.6

Podium
First	(Australia) Jack Brabham	Brabham-Repco
Second	(New Zealand) Denny Hulme	Brabham-Repco
Third	(United Kingdom) Jim Clark	Lotus-Climax

The 13th Gold Cup was a motor race, run to Formula One rules, held on 17 September 1966 at Oulton Park, England. The race was run over 40 laps of the circuit, and was won by Australian driver Jack Brabham in a Brabham BT19.

The race ended in a very close finish, with Denny Hulme crossing the line a fraction of a second behind Brabham. Hulme was driving a slightly newer Brabham model, the BT20.

This was John Campbell-Jones' last appearance in a Formula One race.

== Results ==
Pos	No.	Driver	Entrant	Constructor	Time/Retired	Grid
1	3	(Australia) Jack Brabham	Brabham Racing Organisation	Brabham-Repco	1.06:14.2	1
2	4	(New Zealand) Denny Hulme	Brabham Racing Organisation	Brabham-Repco	+ 0.0 s	2
3	2	(United Kingdom) Jim Clark	Team Lotus	Lotus-Climax	+ 25.2 s	5
4	15	(United Kingdom) Innes Ireland	Bernard White Racing	BRM	+ 1:44.6 s	9
5	10	(United Kingdom) Chris Lawrence	J.A. Pearce Engineering	Cooper-Ferrari	38 laps	8
Ret	5	(United Kingdom) Bob Anderson	DW Racing Enterprises	Brabham-Climax	Con-rod	6
Ret	11	(United Kingdom) Mike Spence	Reg Parnell (Racing)	Lotus-BRM	Clutch	7
Ret	7	(United Kingdom) Graham Hill	Owen Racing Organisation	BRM	Engine	4
Ret	8	(United Kingdom) Jackie Stewart	Owen Racing Organisation	BRM	Overheating	3
DSQ	9	(United Kingdom) John Campbell-Jones	John Willment Automobiles	BRP-Climax	Oil leak	10
DNS	2	(United Kingdom) Peter Arundell	Team Lotus	Lotus-Climax	Car driven by Clark	-
DNS	1	(United Kingdom) Jim Clark	Team Lotus	Lotus-BRM	Engine	-

Previous race: 1966 BRDC International Trophy	Formula One non-championship races 1966 season	Next race: 1967 Race of Champions
Previous race: 1965 International Gold Cup	Oulton Park International Gold Cup	Next race: 1967 International Gold Cup
