= 1969 Guards Formula 5000 Championship =

Seasons
- ← none 1970 →

The 1969 Guards Formula 5000 Championship was a motor racing competition for Formula 5000 cars and cars with unrestricted racing engines of up to 2000cc capacity. The championship was organized in the United Kingdom but also included European rounds. It was the first and only series to carry the Guards Formula 5000 Championship name and the first in a sequence of seven annual European Formula 5000 Championships to be contested between 1969 and 1975. The championship was won by Peter Gethin, driving a McLaren M10A.

== Calendar ==
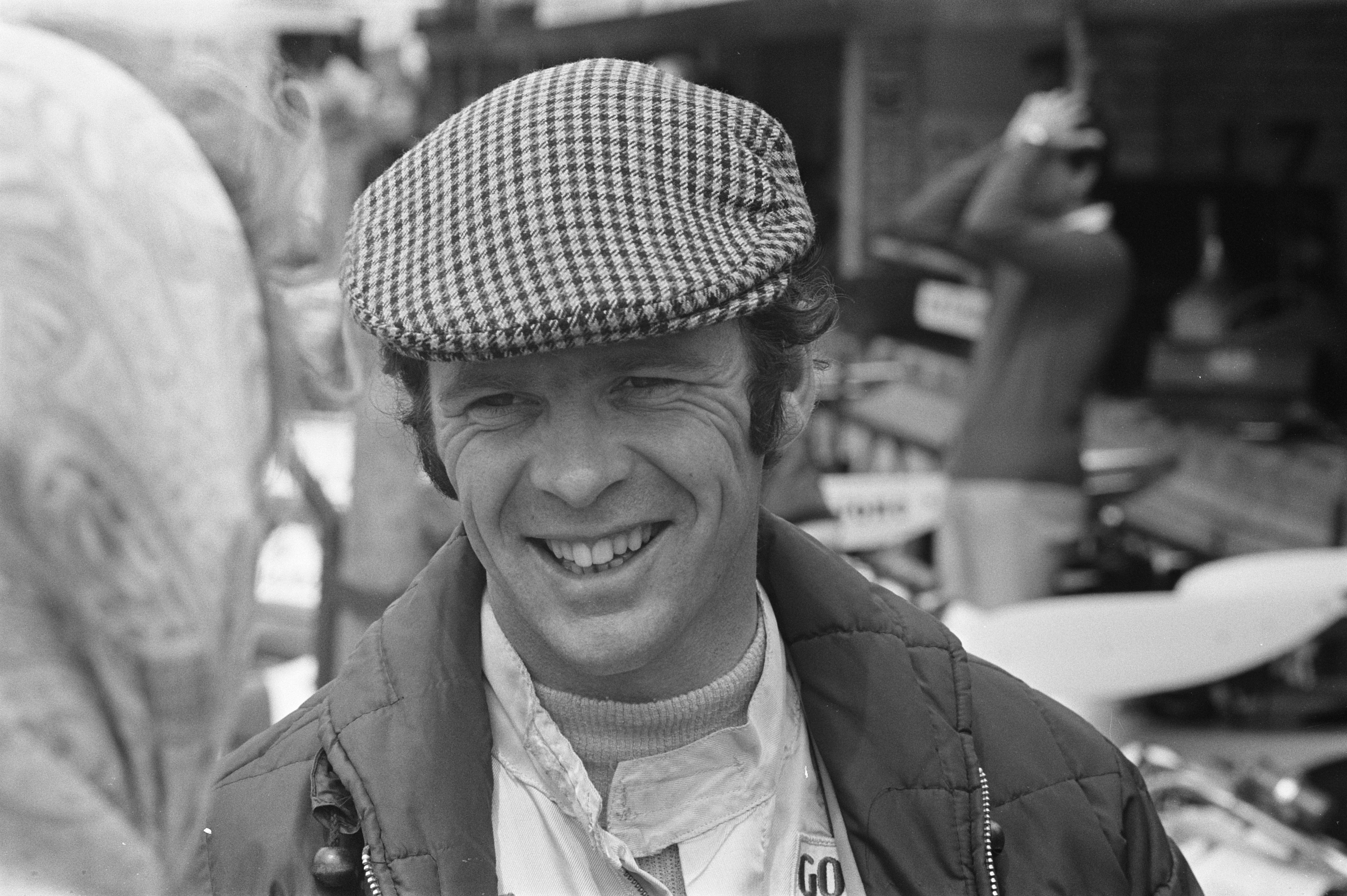
Championship winner Peter Gethin, pictured in 1971

The championship was contested over twelve rounds.

Round	Name	Circuit	Country	Date	Winning driver	Car	Team
1		Oulton Park	Great Britain	4 April	Peter Gethin	McLaren M10A Chevrolet	Church Farm Racing Team
2		Brands Hatch	Great Britain	7 April	Peter Gethin	McLaren M10A Chevrolet	Church Farm Racing Team
3	Kent Messenger 5000	Brands Hatch	Great Britain	11 May	Peter Gethin	McLaren M10A Chevrolet	Church Farm Racing Team
4		Mallory Park	Great Britain	26 May	Peter Gethin	McLaren M10A Chevrolet	Church Farm Racing Team
5	Vanwall Trophy	Silverstone	Great Britain	15 June	Mike Walker	Lola T142 Chevrolet	McKechnie Racing Team
6	Dublin Grand Prix	Mondello Park	Ireland	13 July	David Hobbs	Surtees TS5 Chevrolet	Team Surtees
7	Trofee der Noordzee	Koksijde	Belgium	3 August	Trevor Taylor	Surtees TS5 Chevrolet	Team Surtees
8	Duinen Trophee	Zandvoort	Netherlands	10 Aug	Trevor Taylor	Surtees TS5 Chevrolet	Team Surtees
9		Snetterton	Great Britain	1 September	Trevor Taylor	Surtees TS5 Chevrolet	Team Elite
10	Nations Grand Prix	Hockenheim	Germany	14 September	Trevor Taylor	Surtees TS5 Chevrolet	Team Elite
11		Oulton Park	Great Britain	20 September	Mike Walker	Lola T142 Chevrolet	McKechnie Racing Team
12		Brands Hatch	Great Britain	28 September	Mike Hailwood	Lola T142 Chevrolet	Epstein Cuthbert Racing

== Points system ==
Championship points were awarded at each round on a 500-350-250-200-150-125-100-90-80-75-70-65-60-55 basis to the first 14 drivers, with 50 points awarded for each place from 15th to 20th. The final championship placings were determined from the best eight results from the twelve rounds.

== Championship standings ==
The following table lists the top twenty positions in the championship.

Position	Driver	Car	Entrant	Points
1	(United Kingdom) Peter Gethin	McLaren M10A Chevrolet 5.0	Church Farm Racing Team	2365
2	(United Kingdom) Trevor Taylor	Surtees TS5 Chevrolet 5.0	Team Surtees; Team Elite	2170
3	(United Kingdom) Mike Hailwood	Lola T142 Chevrolet 5.0	Paul Hawkins & Epstein - Cuthbert	2045
4	(United Kingdom) Keith Holland	Lola T142 Chevrolet 5.0	Alan Fraser	2000
5	(United Kingdom) Alan Rollinson	Brabham BT30 Ford FVA 1.6; Lola T142 Chevrolet 5.0	Irish Racing Cars; Doug Hardwick	1920
6	(United Kingdom) Mike Walker	Lola T142 Chevrolet 5.0	Allan McKechnie Racing	1845
7	(Sweden) Ulf Norinder	Lola T142 Chevrolet 5.0	Sports Cars Switzerland	1450
8	(United Kingdom) David Hobbs	Surtees TS5 Chevrolet 5.0	Team Surtees	1275
9	(United Kingdom) Willie Forbes	Lola T142 Chevrolet 5.0		1080
10	(United Kingdom) Robert Lamplough	Lotus 43 Ford 4.7; Lotus 41 Ford 1.6		795
11	(United Kingdom) Derrick Williams	Lola T142 Chevrolet 5.0	Race Development Engineering; DJ Bond Racing	675
12	(Italy) Andrea de Adamich	Surtees TS5 Chevrolet 5.0	Team Surtees	620
13	(United Kingdom) Doug Hardwick	Lola T142 Chevrolet 5.0		575
14	(United Kingdom) Terry Sanger	BRM P83 Ford 4.7		540
15	(United Kingdom) Steve Thompson	Lola T60 Ford 1.6		420
16	(United Kingdom) Kaye Griffiths	BRP Mk2 Ford 4.7		415
17	(Australia) Frank Gardner	Lola T142 Chevrolet 5.0	Sid Taylor	350
=	(United Kingdom) Peter Westbury	Brabham BT30 Ford FVA 1.6; Lola T142 Chevrolet 5.0		350
19	(United Kingdom) Ian Ashley	Kitchiner K3 Ford 4.7		330
20	(Republic of Ireland) Brian Cullen	Lola T60 Ford 1.6 & Brabham BT23C Ford FVA 1.6		310
