= 1965 International Gold Cup =

Race details
- Date: 18 September 1965
- Official name: XII International Gold Cup
- Location: Oulton Park, Cheshire
- Course: Permanent racing facility
- Course length: 4.4434 km (2.761 miles)
- Distance: 40 laps, 177.736 km (108.4 miles)

Pole position
Driver	(New Zealand) Denny Hulme	Brabham
- Time: 1:41.0

Fastest lap
Drivers	(New Zealand) Denny Hulme	Brabham
	(United Kingdom) Jim Clark	Lotus
- Time: 1:41.2

Podium
First	(United Kingdom) John Surtees	Lola
Second	(New Zealand) Denny Hulme	Brabham
Third	(United Kingdom) Graham Hill	Lotus

The 12th International Gold Cup was a Formula Two motor race, held on 18 September 1965, at Oulton Park, Cheshire. The race was run over 40 laps of the circuit, and was won by John Surtees in a Lola T60. Denny Hulme in a Brabham BT16 started from pole position, set joint fastest lap with Jim Clark and finished second. Graham Hill was third in a Lotus 35. Only six-tenths of a second covered the first three finishers.

== Results ==
Pos	No.	Driver	Entrant	Constructor	Time/Retired	Grid
1	1	(United Kingdom) John Surtees	Midland Racing Partnership	Lola T60-Cosworth SCA	1:08:44.0	10
2	9	(New Zealand) Denny Hulme	Brabham Racing Developments	Brabham BT16-Cosworth SCA	+0.2s	1
3	7	(United Kingdom) Graham Hill	John Coombs	Lotus 35-BRM	+0.6s	3
4	23	(United Kingdom) Trevor Taylor	Aurora Gear Racing	Brabham BT16-Cosworth SCA	+19.2s	7
5	17	(United Kingdom) Alan Rees	Roy Winkelmann Racing	Brabham BT16-Cosworth SCA	+34.6s	5
6	4	(United Kingdom) Jim Clark	Ron Harris Team Lotus	Lotus 35-Cosworth SCA	+41.4s	4
7	25	(United Kingdom) Brian Hart	Brian Hart	Lotus 35-Cosworth SCA	+1:14.6	12
8	22	(United Kingdom) Ian Raby	Ian Raby (Racing)	Merlyn Mk.9-Cosworth SCA	+1 lap	16
9	3	(Australia) Paul Hawkins	Midland Racing Partnership	Lola T60-Cosworth SCA	+1 lap	21
10	20	(United Kingdom) Bill Bradley	David Prophet Racing	Brabham BT10-Cosworth SCA	+1 lap	20
11	19	(United Kingdom) David Prophet	David Prophet Racing	Brabham BT10-Cosworth SCA	+1 lap	19
12	14	(United Kingdom) John Cardwell	Merlyn Racing	Merlyn Mk.9-Cosworth SCA	+1 lap	18
13	16	(United Kingdom) Alan Rollinson	DW Racing Enterprises	Brabham BT16-Cosworth SCA	+1 lap	17
14	26	(France) Bernard Collomb	Bernard Collomb	Lotus 35-Cosworth SCA	+4 laps	27
NC	24	(France) Eric Offenstadt	Eric Offenstadt	Cooper T75-BRM	+6 laps	25
NC	18	(Austria) Jochen Rindt	Roy Winkelmann Racing	Brabham BT16-Cosworth SCA	+9 laps	2
NC	11	(United Kingdom) Jackie Stewart	Tyrrell Racing Organisation	Cooper T75-BRM	+11 laps	9
Ret	5	(United Kingdom) Mike Spence	Ron Harris Team Lotus	Lotus 35-Cosworth SCA	23 laps, accident	6
Ret	6	(United States) Peter Revson	Ron Harris Team Lotus	Lotus 35-BRM	8 laps, oil loss	24
Ret	2	(United Kingdom) Richard Attwood	Midland Racing Partnership	Lola T60-Cosworth SCA	5 laps, gearbox	13
Ret	27	(United Kingdom) John Taylor	F.R. Gerard Racing	Cooper T73-Cosworth SCA	5 laps, oil loss	26
Ret	21	(United Kingdom) Mike Beckwith	Normand Ltd.	Brabham BT10-Cosworth SCA	4 laps, accident	15
Ret	10	(United Kingdom) Chris Irwin	Brabham Racing Developments	Brabham BT16-Cosworth SCA	4 laps, accident	11
Ret	15	(United Kingdom) Bob Anderson	DW Racing Enterprises	Brabham BT16-Cosworth SCA	4 laps	14
Ret	8	(Australia) Jack Brabham	Brabham Racing Developments	Brabham BT16-Honda RA300E	1 lap, clutch	8
Ret	28	(Australia) Frank Gardner	John Willment Automobiles	Lotus 35-Cosworth SCA	1 lap, ignition	23
Ret	12	(United States) Bob Bondurant	Tyrrell Racing Organisation	Cooper T75-BRM	0 laps, accident	22
DNA	3	(South Africa) Tony Maggs	Midland Racing Partnership	Lola T60-Cosworth SCA	car raced by Hawkins	
DNA	3	(New Zealand) Chris Amon	Midland Racing Partnership	Lola T60-Cosworth SCA	car raced by Hawkins	
DNA	12	(New Zealand) Chris Amon	Tyrrel Racing Organisation	Cooper T75-BRM	car raced by Bondurant	
DNA	27	(United Kingdom) John Rhodes	F.R. Gerard Racing	Cooper T73-Cosworth SCA	car raced by Taylor	
