= Oulton Park =

Motorsport track in United Kingdom

- Logo since January 2004

- International Circuit (2003–present)
- Location: Little Budworth, Cheshire, England
- Coordinates: 53°10′39″N 2°36′52″W
- FIA Grade: 3
- Owner: MotorSport Vision (January 2004–present)
- Operator: MotorSport Vision (January 2004–present)
- Opened: 8 August 1953; 73 years ago
- Major events: Current: BTCC (1960–1972, 1974–1985, 1987–present); BSB (1991–present); British GT (1993–2004, 2006–present); TCR UK (2018–present); Former: GB3 (2013–2024); British F3 (1964–1990, 1993–2004, 2006–2012); British Formula Renault Championship (1991, 1993–2011); BOSS Formula (1995–1998); F5000 (1969–1975); RAC Tourist Trophy (1965–1969); Oulton Park International Gold Cup (1954–1994, 1996, 1999–2004)
- Website: https://www.oultonpark.co.uk/

International Circuit (2003–present)
- Surface: Asphalt
- Length: 2.676 mi (4.307 km)
- Turns: 17
- Race lap record: 1:28.619 ( (United Kingdom) Joseph Loake, Tatuus MSV-022, 2023, GB3)

Island Circuit (2003–present)
- Surface: Asphalt
- Length: 2.247 mi (3.616 km)
- Turns: 11
- Race lap record: 1:18.556 ( (Sweden) Tom Blomqvist, Tatuus FR2000, 2010, Formula Renault 2.0)

Fosters Circuit (1975–present)
- Surface: Asphalt
- Length: 1.650 mi (2.656 km)
- Turns: 11
- Race lap record: 0:50.079 ( (Italy) Luca Riccitelli, Reynard 94D, 1996, F3000)

International Circuit (1992–2002)
- Surface: Asphalt
- Length: 2.776 mi (4.467 km)
- Turns: 17
- Race lap record: 1:24.680 ( (United Kingdom) Gareth Rees, Reynard 95D, 1996, F3000)

Island Circuit (1992–2002)
- Surface: Asphalt
- Length: 2.362 mi (3.801 km)
- Turns: 11
- Race lap record: 1:23.934 ( (Italy) Gabriele Tarquini, Honda Accord, 2000, Super Touring)

International Circuit (1975–1991)
- Surface: Asphalt
- Length: 2.769 mi (4.456 km)
- Turns: 14
- Race lap record: 1:19.460 ( (Switzerland) Alain Menu, Reynard 89D, 1990, F3000)

Island Circuit (1975–1991)
- Surface: Asphalt
- Length: 2.356 mi (3.792 km)
- Turns: 10
- Race lap record: 1:16.720 ( (United Kingdom) Gary Evans, Ralt RT3, 1984, F3)

International Circuit (1954–1974): km
- Surface: Asphalt
- Length: 2.761 mi (4.443 km)
- Turns: 11
- Race lap record: 1:24.000 ( (United Kingdom) Brian Redman/ (Belgium) Teddy Pilette, Lola T332/Chevron B28, 1974, F5000)

Island Circuit (1954–1974)
- Surface: Asphalt
- Length: 2.356 mi (3.791 km)
- Turns: 9
- Race lap record: 1:45.000 ( (United Kingdom) Bob Gerard, Cooper T23, 1954, F2)

Original Circuit (1953–1974)
- Surface: Asphalt
- Length: 1.504 mi (2.420 km)
- Turns: 7
- Race lap record: 0:43.590 ( (United Kingdom) Bob Berry, Jaguar XK120, 1955, Sports car)
Oulton Park
- Location within Cheshire

Oulton Park is a hard surfaced track used for motor racing, close to the village of Little Budworth, Cheshire, England, 5-mile (8.0 km) from Winsford, 13 mi (21 km) from Chester city centre, 8 mi (13 km) from Northwich and 17 mi (27 km) from Warrington, with a nearby rail connection along the Mid-Cheshire Line. It occupies much of the area which was previously known as the Oulton Estate. The racing circuit is owned and operated by Jonathan Palmer's MotorSport Vision organisation.

== Circuit ==
The track is characterised by rapidly changing gradients, blind crests and several tight corners, characteristics which have earned it comparisons with the Nürburgring's Nordschleife circuit. The full circuit is 2.692 mi (4.332 km). The highest part of the course is Hill Top. Paddock facilities are reasonable in size with large areas of hard-standing and some power points.

The race track can be adapted for shorter courses. The "Foster's" Circuit, which is 1.660 mi (2.672 km), comprises half of the "Cascades" corner followed by the "Hislop's" chicane, it then heads onto Knickerbrook and up the 13% gradient of Clay Hill to work its way round to the start/finish straight. The British Touring Car Championships uses all of the Cascades Corner and Lakeside but then forks off into a hairpin before Island Bend. This hairpin cuts out all of the Island section of the circuit and takes the cars straight back over Hill Top.

Beginning in 2007, all the circuit's marshalling stations were redesigned with protective cages. This was to prevent incidents similar to those seen in the 2006 season when cars had collided with marshalling posts. A cage-protected marshals station was also built at the bottom of the back straight near the chicane preceding Knickerbrook.

=== Knickerbrook corner ===
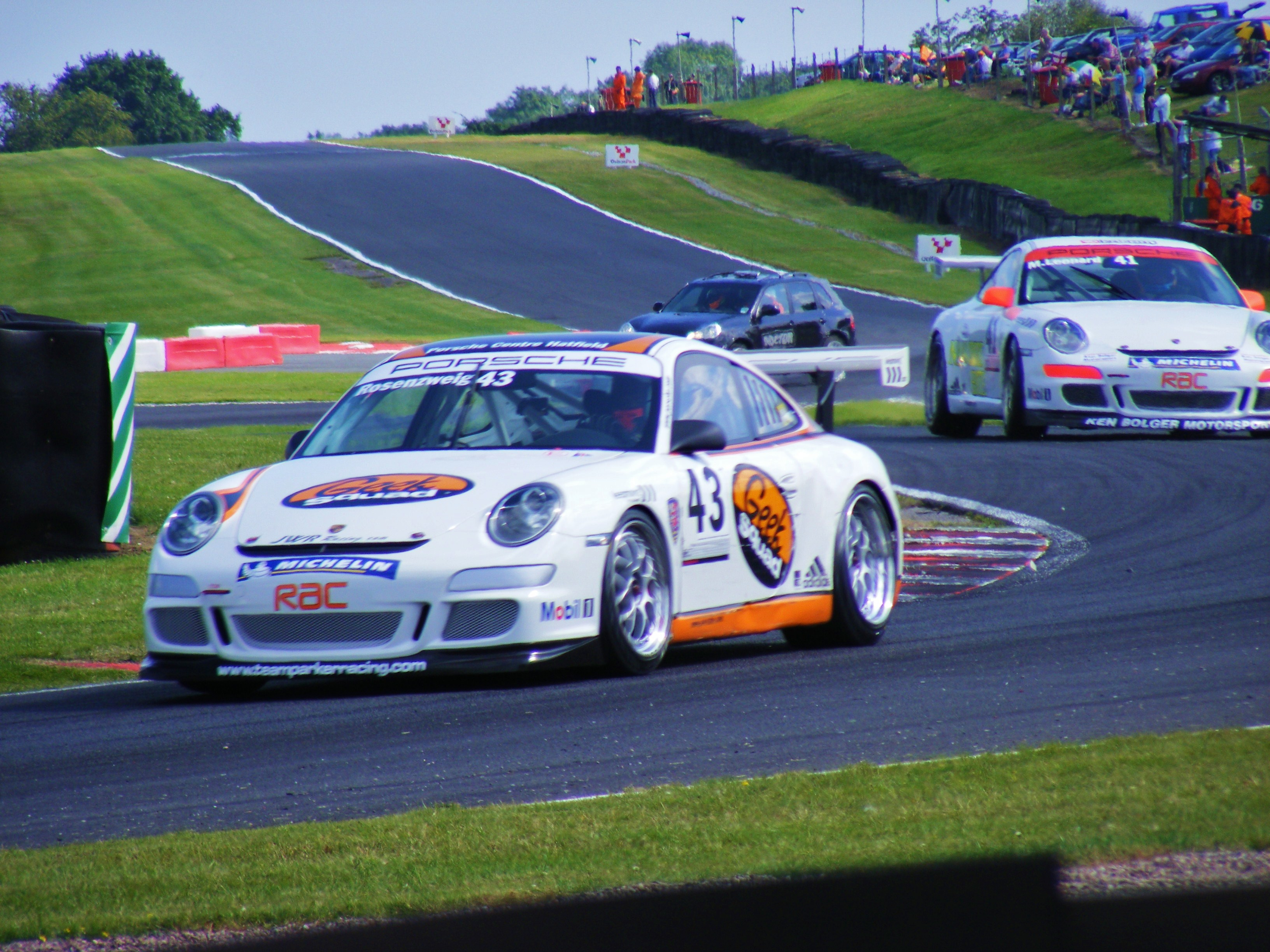
Jake Rosenzweig goes through Knickerbrook corner at Oulton Park during a Porsche Carrera Cup race

The corner is named after an event that occurred when the British demolition expert and raconteur, Blaster Bates, was removing tree stumps with dynamite close to the corner with a colleague. After the first detonation, a courting couple were seen to run off at speed and in some disarray from a nearby bush or bank. On closer investigation, the pair discovered some ladies underwear in the brook and this resulted in the naming of the corner.

Despite its colourful name, it was a notorious corner on circuit because of accidents and driver fatalities. The death of Paul Warwick in 1991 led to a chicane being added at the entry to the corner. Before Warwick's death, the bend had a reputation as a "racers' corner" because it demanded a driver's full commitment and total courage. Originally it was a fifth gear, off camber right-hand bend at the end of a downhill straight called Hilltop. Deep kerbing on the inside of the corner combined with an off camber could easily affect a cars' handling causing it to veer to the outside of the circuit. As an Armco barrier on the outside of the corner eventually intersected with the grass verge, there was a significant lack of run off area for drivers forced wide on the bend.

Since 1991, a right-left chicane (named Hislop's) was installed about 135 m (443 ft) before Knickerbrook to reduce the speed of cars coming down Hilltop.

== History ==
=== Origins – 1950s ===
In the early 18th century the Oulton Estate comprised a manor house and a formal garden surrounded by Cheshire farmland. By the end of the century this farmland was converted into a park, which now is the site of Oulton Park. Some buildings that were part of the estate still exist; the entrance gates, lodges and screen designed by Joseph Turner. During the Second World War, Oulton Park's grounds were used as one of the staging camps for US Army units under the command of General Patton (he stayed at nearby Peover Hall) before the Normandy landings in 1944. American World Heavyweight Champion boxer Joe Louis put on several exhibition bouts for the troops garrisoned at Oulton Park. The fights were staged within the vicinity of the Deer Leap section of the modern circuit. After the war, much of the estate remained unused. The estate's original house had been destroyed by fire in 1926 leaving vacant parkland.

By the early 1950s England had a number of motor racing tracks but the northwest was not well served. The members of the Mid-Cheshire Car Club took it on themselves to rectify the situation. The circuit they developed was on the estate of the Grey-Egerton family. With Sir Philip Gray-Egerton's permission, a circuit was mapped out starting early in 1953 and by August the new track was in existence, measuring 1.504 mi (2.420 km), almost rectangular in shape.

The first meeting took place on 8 August, but the RAC would not allow the public to attend, wanting an opening meeting to be run successfully before allowing paying spectators; nonetheless some 3,000 club members and their guests attended as spectators. The main event of the day was the 33-lap 49.6 mi (79.8 km) Formula Two race, won by Tony Rolt driving Rob Walker's Connaught A Type. The supporting Formula III event was divided into three 10-lap heats (won by Don Trueman, Charles Headland and Don Parker) and a 17-lap final which went to Les Leston.

Oulton Park has a vast catchment area which includes Liverpool, Manchester, Chester and Crewe so it is little surprise that the second meeting and last of 1953, on 3 October, attracted a crowd of 40,000. It was a joint motorcycle and car event, the Wirral 100 Motor Club joining the Mid-Cheshire Car Club in organising it. The car side of the day was confined to three Formula III races and a final, which was won by Glaswegian Ninian Sanderson from Ken Tyrrell.

By April 1954, the track had grown to 2.356 mi (3.792 km) in length and within a year of the opening meeting had grown again, to 2.761 mi (4.443 km). On Easter 1975, another circuit layout, measuring 1.654 mi (2.662 km), came into use. Oulton Park is unique amongst the new post-World War II circuits in that it is a true road circuit whilst its contemporaries were, with one exception, converted airfields (the exception being the short-lived Blandford Circuit in Dorset). It has something in common with Mallory Park in that it can trace its history back a very long way (possibly as far as Roman times) and is mentioned in Domesday Book as ‘Aleton’.

The British Racing Drivers' Club (BRDC) brought the British Empire Trophy to Oulton Park in 1954 and ran it for sports cars on the new 2.356 mi (3.792 km) Island Circuit. Alan Brown won the race in a Cooper-Bristol from Roy Salvadori, driving a Maserati A6GCS, who set a new lap record at 74.73 mph (120.27 km/h).

In August, Oulton Park saw its first international meeting when the Daily Dispatch sponsored the Oulton Park Gold Cup. Apart from the 11-year period when Aintree ran international Formula One races, it fell to Oulton Park to bring the major formulae to the northwest of England and the Gold Cup was run for all the major formulae: Formula One, Formula Two, Formula 5000 and the big sport cars. Its first running over the second new circuit of the year, the 2.761 mi (4.443 km) International circuit, and was for Formula One; the entry was entirely British with the exception of Jean Behra in his Gordini. There were 19 starters; Stirling Moss started from the back of the grid in his new Maserati 250F which had only arrived from the factory on the morning of the race. By the end of lap one, he had passed twelve of his rivals and took the lead from Reg Parnell's Ferrari 625 on the fourth lap to win by 1min 14.4sec at the end of the 36-lap race. Bob Gerard's Cooper-Bristol and Don Beauman's Connaught were the only two other cars on the same lap as Moss. This was the first of Moss's victories in the Gold Cup – he went on to win it another four times, repeating the win in 1955, 1959, 1960 and 1961.

In 1956 the Vintage Sports Car Club brought the Richard Seaman Memorial Trophy Race to Oulton Park from Silverstone, but the BRSCC's Daily Herald Trophy for sport cars was almost rained off. The race was reduced from 56 to 40 laps and the Le Mans-winning Ecurie Ecosse team was withdrawn. Moss won in his works Aston Martin DB3S from his teammate Tony Brooks.

Ahead of the 1957 season, Moss and Brooks tested the Vanwalls at Oulton and advised that the surface should be replaced at Island Bend. Their advice was acted on.

=== 1960s ===
There was a new look to the Cheshire circuit for the 1961 season, the pits being rebuilt into a two-storey affair with a concrete wall to protect the pit crews when working on their charges. The Oulton Park Trophy was a televised event for GT cars which was won by Mike Parkes in the Maranello Concessionaires Ferrari 250GT from Graham Hill in a Jaguar E-Type and Tony Maggs in an Aston Martin DB4GT; Innes Ireland fought his way to fourth in another 250GT after a poor start, setting a new lap record on the way.

The 1961 Gold Cup was Moss's final Cup win, in a unique car. The race was run in damp conditions and this enabled Moss to take the flag with the four-wheel drive Ferguson P99. It was the only race victory for the 4WD F1 car although the car did win the 1964 British Hill Climb Championship.

Oulton Park was bought by Grovewood Securities in 1964, to increase the Company's motor sport portfolio, and later in the year Grovewood also acquired the freehold, thereby ending nearly 500 years of ownership by the Egerton family. Grovewood's takeover coincided with the increase in required safety measures. Being set in parkland, Oulton Park was more difficult and more expensive to bring up to standard than other circuits but the decision to make motorsport first and parkland second was effected.

The spring meeting that year had a distinctly Scottish flavour, Jimmy Clark winning the sports, GT and saloon car races and Jackie Stewart, starting out in International career, winning the Formula Three race in Ken Tyrrell's Cooper-Austin. Clark was the reigning World Champion yet had time to enter a relatively minor meeting in England.

1965 saw the revival of the world's oldest motor race when the Royal Automobile Club's Tourist Trophy came to the Cheshire track. It was run for Sports and GT cars in two 2-hour heats and was won by Denny Hulme in a 2-litre Brabham BT8.

On 2 April 1966, prospective spectators at the British Automobile Racing Club's Oulton Park 200 were turned away, as the circuit was covered in snow. Good Friday 1969 saw the birth of Formula 5000 in Europe: Peter Gethin had a runaway win driving the Church Farm Racing McLaren M10A.

The last RAC Tourist Trophy to be run at Oulton Park took place on Whit Monday 1969 and ended in tragedy. Paul Hawkins lost control of his Lola T70 at Island Bend and hit a tree; he was killed instantly and the race stopped, Trevor Taylor (who had bravely tried to save Hawkins from the blazing wreck) being declared the winner.

=== 1970s ===
Good Friday 1971 saw Formula One return to the Cheshire circuit to contest the Rothmans Trophy. Victory went to the Mexican Pedro Rodríguez, driving a Yardley BRM P160; he set a new highest race average speed at 115.13 mph (185.28 km/h). The fastest lap was shared with Peter Gethin driving a McLaren M10A (who had harried Rodríguez throughout the race) in 1min 25sec at 116.93 mph (188.18 km/h).

Until 1973 racing had always been restricted to Saturdays and Bank Holidays but that year the local council gave permission for four Sunday meetings – but it was to last for only a year. That first Sunday meeting on 13 May featured F5000 as the top race of the day and saw a 1-2-3 win for Chevron, victory going to Teddy Pilette.

=== 1980s – 1990s ===
In 1987 a chicane was added between the Shell Oils Hairpin and Knickerbrook, with the intention of reducing speed to improve safety at what was the fastest section of the circuit.

At the close of the 2000 season the outright lap record on the International circuit stood to the credit of Gareth Rees, driving a Reynard 95D in the British Formula Two Championship on 6 July 1996. He circulated in 1min 24.68secs, at a speed of 117.91 mph (189.76 km/h). The outright lap record on the Fosters circuit was held by Luca Riccitelli in a Formula 3000 car in 50.09secs (119.30 mph (191.99 km/h)).

=== 2000s – present ===
The Knickerbrook chicane was re-modelled slightly between 2002 and 2003, aiming to slow the cars through Knickerbrook up Clay Hill and onto Druids. The circuit was now officially measured at 2.692 mi (4.332 km) long rather than 2.775 mi (4.466 km).

Oulton Park circuit was acquired by MotorSport Vision (MSV) along with Brands Hatch, Snetterton, and Cadwell Park from The Interpublic Group of Companies subsidiary Octagon in January 2004. Octagon previously acquired prior owner Brands Hatch Leisure plc in November 1999.

The circuit hosts rounds of the British Touring Car Championship, two visits for the British Superbike Championship, and the season opener for the British GT Championship, while the Historic Gold Cup classic car meeting in August is dubbed 'the Goodwood of the north'. The BTCC meeting in 2014 attracted a record attendance of 43,000.

== Current major racing events ==
Oulton Park currently hosts the following major UK race championships:

- British Touring Car Championship
- British GT Championship
- British Superbike Championship
- GB3 Championship

The HSCC Oulton Park Gold Cup has also become one of the biggest historic events on the racing calendar, with hundreds of classic cars competing.

Recent additions to the calendar include a Family Fun Day during the May Bank Holiday weekend, which offers family activities, driving experiences and activities not accustomed to racing tracks, such as medieval jousting, while a festival dedicated to the Mini has also been added. During the week the circuit offers some general test days and driving experiences, and can also be hired out for private testing and track days.

=== Oulton Park Gold Cup ===
The Gold Cup was a prize originally awarded to the winner of a non-championship Formula One race held annually at Oulton Park. First ran in 1954, Stirling Moss won the cup and he would go on the win it four more times. Although the race regularly attracted the top teams from across Britain and Europe, the increasing costs of F1 and more countries wishing to have their own Grand Prix led to the Gold Cup falling by the wayside, the last true F1 race taking place in 1972. The Gold Cup would continue albeit with different formulae: Formula 5000, Formula 3000, British Formula One through to British GT and British Touring Cars. Since 2003, the Gold Cup meeting is an event run by the Historic Sports Car Club.

== Events ==
Current

- May: British GT Championship, GB4 Championship, British Superbike Championship, British Supersport Championship, Moto4 British Cup, Touring Car Rewind:North
- June: British Touring Car Championship, Ferrari Challenge UK, Supercar Pageant
- August: British Superbike Championship, British Supersport Championship, Oulton Park Gold Cup, US Autoshow
- October: TCR UK Touring Car Championship

Former

- BOSS Formula (1995–1998)
- British Formula One Championship (1978-1980, 1982)
- British Formula 2 Championship (1989–1994, 1996)
- British Formula 3 International Series (1964–1990, 1993–2004, 2006–2012)
- British Formula Renault Championship (1991, 1993–2011)
- EuroBOSS Series (1995–1998)
- European Formula 5000 Championship (1969–1975)
- F4 British Championship (2015–2023, 2025)
- GB3 Championship (2013–2024)
- Oulton Park International Gold Cup (1954–1994, 1996, 1999–2004)
- Porsche Carrera Cup Great Britain (2003–2013, 2015–2023)
- RAC Tourist Trophy (1965–1969)
- Shellsport International Series (1976–1977)
- World Sportscar Championship (1965)

== Records ==
The current lap record for the International Circuit 2.692 mi (4.332 km) is 1:28.619, set by Joseph Loake, in his Tatuus MSV-022 in the GB3 meeting in 2023.

The outright lap record set for the International Circuit in use between 1992 and 2002 (2.775 mi (4.466 km)) was 1:24.68 (117.91 mph (189.76 km/h)), set by Gareth Rees, in his Reynard 95D in the British Formula Two Championship on 6 July 1996 at the circuit's last running of the Gold Cup as a single-seater event.

On two wheels the outright lap record for the International Circuit is held by Leon Haslam on a Ducati Panigale V4 R on 2025: in race 2 of the British Superbikes category he set a record of 1:32.817.

=== Lap records ===
As of October 2026, the fastest official race lap records at Oulton Park are listed as:

Category	Time	Driver	Vehicle	Event
International Circuit (2003–present): 2.676 mi (4.307 km)
GB3	1:28.619	Joseph Loake	Tatuus MSV-022	2023 Oulton Park GB3 round
Formula Three	1:28.688	Lucas Foresti	Dallara F311	2011 Oulton Park British F3 round
Superbike	1:32.817	Leon Haslam	Ducati Panigale V4 R	2025 1st Oulton Park BSB round
GT3	1:33.380	Sven Müller	Porsche 911 (992 I) GT3 R	2025 Oulton Park British GT round
GB4	1:34.827	Alex O'Grady	Tatuus MSV GB4-025	2026 Oulton Park GB4 round
Superkart	1:34.909	Lee Harpham	VM MS Kart Division 1 Superkart	2026 BMCRC - MRO Championships
Formula Palmer Audi	1:35.287	Jack Clarke	Formula Palmer Audi car	2008 Oulton Park Formula Palmer Audi round
Ferrari Challenge	1:35.506	Gilbert Yates	Ferrari 296 Challenge	2025 Oulton Park Ferrari Challenge UK round
Supersport	1:36.411	Oliver Bayliss	Triumph Street Triple RS 765	2026 2nd Oulton Park BSS round
Sportbike	1:41.086	Rhys Stephenson	Triumph Daytona 660	2025 1st Oulton Park British Sportbike round
GT4	1:42.237	Jack Brown	McLaren Artura GT4	2025 Oulton Park British GT round
TCR Touring Car	1:42.714	Chris Smiley	Honda Civic Type R TCR (FK8)	2022 1st Oulton Park TCR UK round
NGTC	1:43.005	Colin Turkington	BMW 125i M Sport	2014 Oulton Park BTCC round
BMW F900R Cup	1:43.221	Barry Burrell	BMW F900R	2025 Oulton Park BMW F900R Cup round
Moto3	1:45.569	Ryan Frost	Honda NSF250R	2026 Oulton Park Moto4 British Cup round
Island Circuit (2003–present): 2.247 mi (3.616 km)
Formula Renault 2.0	1:18.556	Tom Blomqvist	Tatuus FR2000	2010 Oulton Park Formula Renault 2.0 round
Formula 4	1:20.473	Alex Dunne	Tatuus F4-T421	2022 Oulton Park British F4 round
Porsche Carrera Cup	1:21.415	James Kellett	Porsche 911 (992 I) GT3 Cup	2023 Oulton Park Porsche Carrera Cup GB round
GT4	1:23.178	Joe Marshall	Porsche 718 Cayman GT4 RS Clubsport	2026 Oulton Park Porsche Sprint Challenge Great Britain round
NGTC	1:24.052	Tom Ingram	Hyundai i30 Fastback N Performance	2025 Oulton Park BTCC round
Formula BMW	1:24.376	Phil Glew	Mygale FB02	2004 Oulton Park Formula BMW UK round
TCR Touring Car	1:25.712	Callum Newsham	Hyundai Elantra N TCR (2024)	2026 Oulton Park TCR UK round
Super 2000	1:27.793	Gordon Shedden	Honda Civic BTCC	2010 Oulton Park BTCC round
BTC Touring	1:28.403	Colin Turkington	BTC-T MG ZS EX259	2006 Oulton Park BTCC round
Fosters Circuit (1975–present): 1.650 mi (2.656 km)
Formula 3000	0:50.079	Luca Riccitelli	Reynard 94D	1996 1st Oulton Park British F2 round
Formula One	0:53.080	Jim Crawford	Ensign N180B	1982 Oulton Park Gold Cup
Formula Three	0:57.180	Davy Jones	Ralt RT3	1983 2nd Oulton Park British F3 round
Group 6	0:59.200	John Lepp	March 76S	1976 Oulton Park RAC British Championship round
Super Touring	0:59.389	Rickard Rydell	Volvo S40	1999 1st Oulton Park BTCC round
Formula 5000	1:01.800	Alan Jones	March 75A	1975 Oulton Park Gold Cup
Group A	1:08.230	Jeff Allam	Rover Vitesse	1983 Oulton Park BSCC round
International Circuit (1992–2002): 2.776 mi (4.467 km)
Formula 3000	1:24.680	Gareth Rees	Reynard 95D	1996 2nd Oulton Park British F2 round
Formula Three	1:30.157	Takuma Sato	Dallara F301	2001 Oulton Park British F3 round
BSB	1:31.532	Steve Hislop	Ducati 998 RS	2002 2nd Oulton Park BSB round
GT1 (Prototype)	1:31.741	Magnus Wallinder	Porsche 911 GT1	1998 Oulton Park British GT round
Group 4	1:40.650	Thorkild Thyrring	De Tomaso Pantera	1995 Oulton Park British GT round
GT2	1:40.650	Thomas Erdos	Marcos LM600	1995 Oulton Park British GT round
Super Touring	1:41.960	Joachim Winkelhock	BMW 320i	1996 1st Oulton Park BTCC round
Group 5	1:45.240	Ross Hyett	Porsche 935 Turbo	1994 Oulton Park British GT round
Island Circuit (1992–2002): 2.362 mi (3.801 km)
Super Touring	1:23.934	Gabriele Tarquini	Honda Accord	2000 2nd Oulton Park BTCC round
BTC Touring	1:27.595	Matt Neal	BTC-T Vauxhall Astra Coupe	2002 Oulton Park BTCC round
International Circuit (1975–1991): 2.769 mi (4.456 km)
Formula 3000	1:19.460	Alain Menu	Reynard 89D	1990 1st Oulton Park British F3000 round
Formula Three	1:28.590	Mika Häkkinen	Ralt RT34	1990 Oulton Park British F3 round
Group A	1:37.840	Tim Harvey	Ford Sierra RS500 Cosworth	1990 1st Oulton Park BTCC round
Super Touring	1:43.350	Gary Ayles	Toyota Carina	1991 Oulton Park BTCC round
Island Circuit (1975–1991): 2.356 mi (3.792 km)
Formula Three	1:16.720	Gary Evans	Ralt RT3	1984 Oulton Park British F3 round
Can-Am	1:17.500	Brian Cocks	Lola T530	1984 Oulton Park Thundersports round
Sports 2000	1:20.700	Mike Blanchet	Lola T594C	1984 Oulton Park Thundersports round
Group A	1:29.220	James Weaver	BMW 635CSi	1984 Oulton Park BSCC round
International Circuit (1954–1974): 2.761 mi (4.443 km)
Formula 5000	1:24.000	Brian Redman (Note: Both drivers took the same lap time independently.); Teddy Pilette	Lola T332; Chevron B28	1974 1st Oulton Park F5000 round
Formula One	1:24.400	Denny Hulme	McLaren M19A	1972 International Gold Cup
Formula Two	1:27.400	Ronnie Peterson (Note: All those four drivers took the same lap time independently.); Niki Lauda; James Hunt; John Watson	March 722; March 722; March 712M; Chevron B20	1972 Oulton Park British F2 round
Group 4	1:34.400	Herbert Müller	Lola T70 Mk.IIIB GT	1969 R.A.C. Tourist Trophy
Group 6	1:35.190	John Bridges	Chevron B23	1973 Oulton Park MN GT round
Formula Libre	1:41.400	Malcolm Payne	Brabham BT14	1966 Oulton Park Formula Libre race
Group 3	1:47.200	Jack Sears	Shelby Daytona Coupe	1965 R.A.C. Tourist Trophy
Group 5	1:56.800	Andrea de Adamich	Alfa Romeo 1600 GTA	1967 R.A.C. Tourist Trophy
Island Circuit (1954–1974): 2.356 mi (3.791 km)
Formula Two	1:45.000	Bob Gerard	Cooper T23	1954 Oulton Park Formula Libre race
Original Circuit (1953–1974): 1.504 mi (2.420 km)
Sports car	0:43.590	Bob Berry	Jaguar XK120	1955 Oulton Park Sports Car race
Formula Two	1:08.200	Tony Rolt	Connaught Type A	1953 Mid-Cheshire MC Race

== Major race results ==
=== Formula One Non-World Championship races ===
Year	Race	Driver	Constructor
1954	International Gold Cup	Stirling Moss	Maserati 250F
1955	International Gold Cup	Stirling Moss	Maserati 250F
1959	International Gold Cup	Stirling Moss	Cooper-Climax T51
1960	International Gold Cup	Stirling Moss	Lotus-Climax 18
1961	International Gold Cup	Stirling Moss	Ferguson-Climax P99
1962	International Gold Cup	Jim Clark	Lotus-Climax 25
1963	International Gold Cup	Jim Clark	Lotus-Climax 25
1966	International Gold Cup	Jack Brabham	Brabham-Repco BT19
1967	Daily Express Spring Cup	Jack Brabham	Brabham-Repco BT20
	International Gold Cup	Jack Brabham	Brabham-Repco BT24
1968	International Gold Cup	Jackie Stewart	Matra-Cosworth MS10
1969	International Gold Cup	Jacky Ickx	Brabham-Cosworth BT26A
1970	International Gold Cup	John Surtees	Surtees-Cosworth TS7
1971	Rothmans/Daily Express International Spring Trophy	Pedro Rodríguez	BRM P160
	International Gold Cup	John Surtees	Surtees-Cosworth TS9
1972	International Gold Cup	Denny Hulme	McLaren-Cosworth M19A
1978	International Gold Cup	Tony Trimmer	McLaren-Cosworth M23
	Oulton Park Formula 1 Trophy	Guy Edwards	March-Cosworth 781
1979	International Gold Cup	Tony Trimmer	Wolf-Cosworth WR4
	Daily Express Formula 1 Trophy	Emilio de Villota	Lotus-Cosworth 78
1980	International Gold Cup	Guy Edwards	Arrows-Cosworth A1
	Daily Express Formula 1 Trophy	Jim Crawford	Chevron-Ford B45
1982	International Gold Cup	Tony Trimmer	Fittipaldi-Cosworth F8

=== European Formula 5000 Championship ===
The BRSCC's F5000 championship, organised in the UK but taking in events across Europe, started in 1969. The title sponsorship moved from Guards to Rothmans to Shellsport before the series let in Formula One, Formula Two and Formula Atlantic cars for 1976.

Year	Race	Driver	Car
1969	Guards Formula 5000 Championship Rd.1	Peter Gethin	McLaren-Chevrolet M10A
	Guards Formula 5000 Championship Rd.11	Mike Walker	Lola-Chevrolet T142
1970	Guards European Formula 5000 Championship Rd.1	Mike Walker	McLaren-Chevrolet M10B
	Guards European Formula 5000 Championship Rd.19	Reine Wisell	McLaren-Chevrolet M10B
1971	Rothmans European Formula 5000 Championship Rd.16	Frank Gardner	Lola-Chevrolet T300
1972	Rothmans European Formula 5000 Championship Rd.8	Brian Redman	Chevron-Chevrolet B24
	Rothmans European Formula 5000 Championship Rd.13	Graham McRae	McRae-Chevrolet GM1
1973	Rothmans Formula 5000 Championship Rd.6	Teddy Pilette	Chevron-Chevrolet B24
	International Gold Cup	Peter Gethin	Chevron-Chevrolet B24
1974	Rothmans 5000 European Championship Rd.4	Brian Redman	Lola-Chevrolet T332
1974	International Gold Cup; Rothmans 5000 European Championship Rd.15	Ian Ashley	Lola-Chevrolet T330
1975	Shellsport Formula 5000 Championship Rd.3	Gordon Spice	Lola-Chevrolet T332
	International Gold Cup	David Purley	Chevron-Ford B30

=== International Formula Two Championship ===
Year	Race	Driver	Car
1953	Mid-Cheshire M.C. Formula 2 Race	Tony Rolt	Connaught-Lea Francis Type A
1956	International Gold Cup	Roy Salvadori	Cooper-Climax T41
1957	International Gold Cup	Jack Brabham	Cooper-Climax T43
1959	British Empire Trophy	Jim Russell	Cooper-Climax T45
1960	Oulton Park Trophy	Innes Ireland	Lotus-Climax 18
1960	Lancashire & Cheshire C.C. F2 Race	Roy Salvadori	Cooper-Climax T51
1964	International Gold Cup	Jack Brabham	Brabham-Cosworth BT10
1965	Spring Trophy	Denny Hulme	Brabham-Cosworth BT16
1965	International Gold Cup	John Surtees	Lola-Cosworth T60
1966	BARC ‘200’	Cancelled – Snow on track	
1972	John Player British Formula 2, Rd. 2	Niki Lauda	March-Ford 722
1972	John Player British Formula 2, Rd. 5	Ronnie Peterson	March-Ford 722

=== British Formula 3000/Formula Two Championship ===
Year	Race	Driver	Car
1989	British Formula 3000 Championship, Rd. 3	Andrew Gilbert-Scott	Reynard-Cosworth 88D
	International Gold Cup	Paolo Carcasci	Reynard-Cosworth 88D
1990	British Formula 3000 Championship, Rd. 2	Alain Menu	Reynard-Cosworth 89D
	International Gold Cup	Richard Dean	Reynard-Cosworth 89D
1991	British Formula 3000 Championship, Rd. 1	Paul Warwick	Reynard-Cosworth 90D
	International Gold Cup	Paul Warwick	Reynard-Cosworth 90D
1992	Halfords British Formula 2 Championship, Rd. 1	Peter Kox	Reynard-Cosworth 91D
	International Gold Cup	Yvan Muller	Reynard-Cosworth 91D
1993	Halfords British Formula 3000 Championship, Rd. 1	Philippe Adams	Reynard-Cosworth 92D
	Halfords British Formula 3000 Championship, Rd. 5	Mikke van Hool	Reynard-Cosworth 91D
1994	Venson British Formula 3000 Championship, Rd. 1	Phil Andrews	Reynard-Cosworth 93D
1996	Venson British Formula 3000 Championship, Rd. 1	Gareth Rees	Reynard-Cosworth 95D
	International Gold Cup	Gareth Rees	Reynard-Cosworth 95D

=== British Formula Three season ===
Year	Race	Driver	Car
1964	BARC	Melvyn Long	Lotus-Ford 27
	Express & Star Championship, Rd. 4	Jackie Stewart	Cooper -BMC T72
1965	Spring Trophy (F3)	Roy Pike	Brabham-Ford BT16
	BARC Member's Meeting	Howard Heerey	Brabham-Ford BT9
	Spring Grove Trophy	Piers Courage	Brabham-Ford BT10
	International Gold Cup (support race)	Roy Pike	Brabham-Ford BT16
1966	BARC “200”	Cancelled – Snow on Track	
	BARC	Chris Lambert	Brabham-Ford BT15
1967	Les Leston Championship, Rd. 3	Chris Williams	Brabham-Ford BT21
	Les Leston Championship, Rd. 5	Alan Rollinson	Brabham-Ford BT21
	Les Leston Championship, Rd. 11	Mike Walker	Brabham-Ford BT21
	BARC	John Miles	Lotus-Ford 41
	BRSCC	Morris Nunn	Lotus-Ford 41
	Les Leston Championship, Rd. 17	Peter Gethin	Brabham-Ford BT21
	Les Leston Championship, Rd. 24	Derek Bell	Brabham-Ford BT21
	Les Leston Championship, Rd. 25	Tony Lanfranchi	Merlyn-Ford Mk 10
1968	Lombank Championship, Rd.2	Morris Nunn	Lotus-Ford 41
	BRSCC Trophy	Mike Walker	McLaren-Ford M4A
	Oulton Park ‘100’	Cyd Williams	Brabham-Ford BT21
	Mid-Cheshire Cup	Tim Schenken	Chevron-Ford B9
	Lombank Championship, Rd.12	Tim Schenken	Titan-Ford Mk3
	Lombank Championship, Rd.16	Tim Schenken	Chevron-Ford B9
	Lombank Championship, Rd.17	Tim Schenken	Chevron-Ford B9
	Lombank Championship, Rd.20	Tim Schenken	Chevron-Ford B9
	Lombank Championship, Rd.21	Tetsu Ikuzawa	Brabham-Ford BT21B
1969	Lombank Championship, Rd.2	Tim Schenken	Brabham-Ford BT28
	Lombank Championship, Rd.6	Alan Rollinson	Brabham-Ford BT21B
	BARC	Cyd Williams	Chevron-Ford B15
1970	British Empire Trophy	Bev Bond	Lotus-Ford 59A
	Shell Super Oil British F3 Championship, Rd.6	David Walker	Lotus-Ford 59A
	International Gold Cup (support race)	Carlos Pace	Lotus-Ford 59A
	Lombank British F3 Championship, Rd.10	Barrie Maskell	Chevron-Ford B17
1971	North Central Lombard British F3 Championship, Rd 4	Sonny Eade	Brabham-Ford BT28
	British Empire Trophy	David Walker	Lotus-Ford 69
	North Central Lombard British F3 Championship, Rd 8	Jody Scheckter	Merlyn-Ford Mk 21
1972	Shell Super Oil British F3 Championship, Rd2	Roger Williamson	March-Ford 723
	Shell Super Oil British F3 Championship, Rd 4	Tony Brise	Brabham-Ford BT38
	North Central Lombard British F3 Championship, Rd 10	Rikky von Opel	Ensign-Ford LNF3
	Shell Super Oil British F3 Championship, Rd 11	Roger Williamson	GRD-Ford 372
1973	John Player British F3 Championship, Rd 2	Russell Wood	March-Ford 733
	John Player British F3 Championship, Rd 5	Conny Andersson	March-Ford 733
	North Central Lombard British F3 Championship, Rd 8	Mo Harness	March-Ford 733
	John Player British F3 Championship, Rd 12	Alan Jones	GRD-Ford 373
1974	Lombard North Central British F3 Championship, Rd 1	Brian Henton	March-Ford 743
	Lombard North Central British F3 Championship, Rd 3	Brian Henton	March-Ford 743
	Forward Trust British F3 Championship, Rd 8	Brian Henton	March-Ford 743
	Lombard North Central British F3 Championship, Rd 8	Alex Ribeiro	GRD-Ford 374
	Lombard North Central British F3 Championship, Rd 13	Brian Henton	March-Ford 743
1975	BP Super Visco British F3 Championship, Rd 11	Danny Sullivan	Modus-Toyota M1
	BP Super Visco British F3 Championship, Rd 18	Ingo Hoffmann	March-Toyota 753
1976	Race of the North	Rupert Keegan	March-Toyota 743
	BP Super Visco British F3 Championship, Rd 7	Bruno Giacomelli	March-Toyota 763
1977	BP Super Visco British F3 Championship, Rd 2	Eje Elgh	Chevron-Toyota B38
1978	Forward Trust British F3 Championship, Rd 4	Chico Serra	March-Toyota 783
	Vandervell British F3 Championship, Rd 4	Nelson Piquet	Ralt-Toyota RT1
1979	Vandervell British F3 Championship, Rd 17	Mike Thackwell	March-Toyota 793
1980	Vandervell British F3 Championship, Rd 14	Roberto Guerrero	Argo-Toyota JM6
	Vandervell British F3 Championship, Rd 19	Stefan Johansson	Ralt-Toyota RT3
1981	Marlboro British F3 Championship, Rd 15	Raul Boesel	Ralt-Toyota RT3/81
	Marlboro British F3 Championship, Rd 17	Jonathan Palmer	Ralt-Toyota RT3/81
1982	Marlboro British F3 Championship, Rd 13	Enrique Mansilla	Ralt-Toyota RT3D/82
	Marlboro British F3 Championship, Rd 17	Martin Brundle	Ralt-Toyota RT3D/82
1983	Marlboro British F3 Championship, Rd 15	Calvin Fish	Ralt-Volkswagen RT3/83
	Marlboro British F3 Championship, Rd 17	Martin Brundle	Ralt-Toyota RT3/83
1984	Marlboro British F3 Championship, Rd 11	Russell Spence	Ralt-Volkswagen RT3/84
1985	Marlboro British F3 Championship, Rd 14	Gerrit van Kouwen	Ralt-Volkswagen RT30
1986	Lucas British F3 Championship, Rd 10	Martin Donnelly	Ralt-Volkswagen RT30/86
1987	Lucas British F3 Championship, Rd 14	Martin Donnelly	Ralt-Volkswagen RT31
1988	International Gold Cup	Gary Brabham	Ralt-Volkswagen RT32
1989	Lucas British F3 Championship, Rd 11	David Brabham	Ralt-Volkswagen RT33
1990	British F3 Championship, Rd 14	Mika Häkkinen	Ralt-Mugen-Honda RT34
1993	British F3 Championship, Rd 7	Oliver Gavin	Dallara-Vauxhall F393
1994	British F3 Championship, Rd 9	Jan Magnussen	Dallara-Mugen-Honda F394
1995	British F3 Championship, Rd 10	Cristiano da Matta	Dallara-Mugen-Honda F395
1996	British F3 Championship, Rd 7	Ralph Firman	Dallara-Mugen-Honda F396
1997	Autosport British F3 Championship, Rd 7	Peter Dumbreck	Dallara-Mugen-Honda F397
1998	Autosport British F3 Championship, Rd 6	Enrique Bernoldi	Dallara-Renault F398
1999	Autosport British F3 Championship, Rd 6	Luciano Burti	Dallara-Mugen-Honda F399
2000	Green Flag British F3 Championship, Rd 3	Tomas Scheckter	Dallara-Mugen-Honda F399
2001	Green Flag British F3 Championship, Rd 7	Takuma Sato	Dallara-Mugen-Honda F301
	Green Flag British F3 Championship, Rd 8	Takuma Sato	Dallara-Mugen-Honda F301
2002	Green Flag British F3 Championship, Rd 19	Heikki Kovalainen	Dallara-Renault F302
	Green Flag British F3 Championship, Rd 20	James Courtney	Dallara-Mugen-Honda F302
2003	British F3 Championship, Rd 13	Alan van der Merwe	Dallara-Mugen-Honda F303
	British F3 Championship, Rd 14	Alan van der Merwe	Dallara-Mugen-Honda F303
2004	British F3 Championship, Rd 15	Nelson Piquet Jr.	Dallara-Mugen-Honda F304
	British F3 Championship, Rd 16	Nelson Piquet Jr.	Dallara-Mugen-Honda F304
2006	Lloyds TSB Insurance British F3 Championship, Rd 1	Bruno Senna	Dallara-Mercedes F306
	Lloyds TSB Insurance British F3 Championship, Rd 2	Bruno Senna	Dallara-Mercedes F306
2007	Lloyds TSB Insurance British F3 Championship, Rd 1	Maro Engel	Dallara-Mercedes F307
	Lloyds TSB Insurance British F3 Championship, Rd 2	Marko Asmer	Dallara-Mercedes F307
2008	British F3 Championship, Rd 1	Oliver Turvey	Dallara-Mercedes F308
	British F3 Championship, Rd 2	Jaime Alguersuari	Dallara-Mercedes F308
2009	Cooper Tires British F3 Championship, Rd 1	Daniel Ricciardo	Dallara-Mercedes F309
	Cooper Tires British F3 Championship, Rd 2	Daniel Ricciardo	Dallara-Mercedes F309
2010	Cooper Tires British F3 Championship, Rd 1 Race 1	Jean-Éric Vergne	Dallara-Volkswagen F310
	Cooper Tires British F3 Championship, Rd 1 Race 2	Rupert Svendsen-Cook	Dallara-Volkswagen F310
	Cooper Tires British F3 Championship, Rd 1 Race 3	Jean-Éric Vergne	Dallara-Volkswagen F310
2011	Cooper Tires British F3 Championship, Rd 2 Race 1	Lucas Foresti	Dallara-Mercedes F311
	Cooper Tires British F3 Championship, Rd 2 Race 2	Riki Christodoulou	Dallara-Volkswagen F310
	Cooper Tires British F3 Championship, Rd 2 Race 3	Felipe Nasr	Dallara-Volkswagen F308
2012	Cooper Tires British F3 Championship, Rd 1 Race 1	Jack Harvey	Dallara-Volkswagen F312
	Cooper Tires British F3 Championship, Rd 1 Race 2	Pipo Derani	Dallara-Mercedes F312
	Cooper Tires British F3 Championship, Rd 1 Race 3	Félix Serrallés	Dallara-Volkswagen F312
2016	BRDC British F3 Championship Rd.10	Ricky Collard	Tatuus-Cosworth F4-016
	BRDC British F3 Championship Rd.11	Toby Sowery	Tatuus-Cosworth F4-016
	BRDC British F3 Championship Rd.12	Ricky Collard	Tatuus-Cosworth F4-016
2017	BRDC British F3 Championship Rd.1	Enaam Ahmed	Tatuus-Cosworth F4-016
	BRDC British F3 Championship Rd.2	Enaam Ahmed	Tatuus-Cosworth F4-016
	BRDC British F3 Championship Rd.3	Enaam Ahmed	Tatuus-Cosworth F4-016

=== World Sportscar Championship ===
Year	Race	Driver	Car
1965	RAC Tourist Trophy	Denny Hulme	Brabham-Climax BT8

=== European Touring Car Championship ===
Year	Race	Driver	Car
1967	RAC Tourist Trophy	Andrea de Adamich	Alfa Romeo 1600 GTA

=== British Touring Car Championship ===
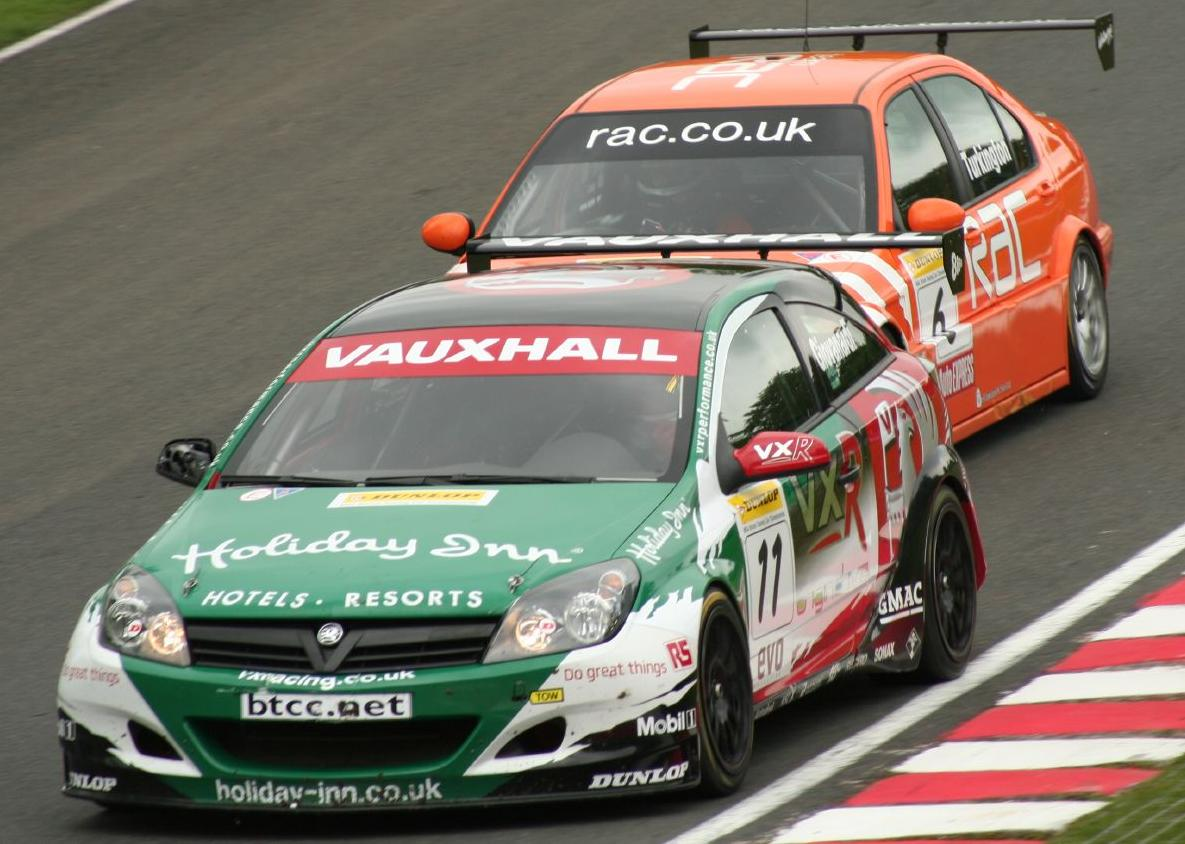
Fabrizio Giovanardi (leading Colin Turkington) driving for Vauxhall at the Oulton Park round of the 2006 British Touring Car Championship

Year	Race	Class	Driver	Car
1960	Supa Tura British Saloon Car Championship, Rd.4		Don Parker	Jaguar XK150
1961	British Saloon Car Championship, Rd.8		Roy Salvadori	Jaguar MkII 3.8
1962	British Saloon Car Championship, Rd.8		Graham Hill	Jaguar MkII 3.8
1963	British Saloon Car Championship, Rd.2		Graham Hill	Jaguar MkII 3.8
1963	British Saloon Car Championship, Rd.10		Dan Gurney	Ford Galaxie
1964	British Saloon Car Championship, Rd.3		Jim Clark	Lotus Cortina
1964	British Saloon Car Championship, Rd.8		Jim Clark	Lotus Cortina
1965	British Saloon Car Championship, Rd.2		Roy Pierpoint	Ford Mustang
1965	British Saloon Car Championship, Rd.8		Jim Clark	Lotus Cortina
1966	British Saloon Car Championship, Rd.7	Classes A & B	Chris Craft	Ford Anglia
1966	British Saloon Car Championship, Rd.7	Classes C & D	Jim Clark	Lotus Cortina
1967	British Saloon Car Championship, Rd.9	Classes A & B	John Rhodes	Morris Mini Cooper S
1967	British Saloon Car Championship, Rd.9	Classes C & D	Frank Gardner	Ford Falcon Sprint
1968	British Saloon Car Championship, Rd.9		Brian Muir	Ford Falcon Sprint
1969	British Saloon Car Championship, Rd.10		Dennis Leech	Ford Falcon Sprint
1970	British Saloon Car Championship, Rd.10		Frank Gardner	Ford Mustang Boss 302
1971	British Saloon Car Championship, Rd.9		Brian Muir	Chevrolet Camaro Z28
1972	British Saloon Car Championship, Rd.2		Brian Muir	Ford Capri RS2600
1972	British Saloon Car Championship, Rd.7		Frank Gardner	Chevrolet Camaro Z28
1974	Castrol Anniversary British Saloon Car Championship, Rd.4		Stuart Graham	Chevrolet Camaro Z28
1974	Castrol Anniversary British Saloon Car Championship, Rd.11		Stuart Graham	Chevrolet Camaro Z28
1975	British Saloon Car Championship, Rd.3	Classes A & B	Andy Rouse	Triumph Dolomite Sprint
1975	British Saloon Car Championship, Rd.3	Classes C & D	Stuart Graham	Chevrolet Camaro Z28
1975	British Saloon Car Championship, Rd.14		Vince Woodman	Chevrolet Camaro Z28
1976	Keith Prowse British Saloon Car Championship, Rd.3	Classes B, C & D	Tom Walkinshaw	Ford Capri II 3.0S
1976	Keith Prowse British Saloon Car Championship, Rd.3	Class A	Bernard Unett	Hillman Avenger 1300
1977	British Saloon Car Championship, Rd.3	Classes B, C & D	Tony Dron	Triumph Dolomite Sprint
1977	British Saloon Car Championship, Rd.3	Class A	Bernard Unett	Chrysler Avenger 1300
1978	Tricentrol British Saloon Car Championship, Rd.2	Classes C & D	Gordon Spice	Ford Capri III 3.0S
1978	Tricentrol British Saloon Car Championship, Rd.2	Classes A & B	Richard Lloyd	Volkswagen Golf GTI
1978	Tricentrol British Saloon Car Championship, Rd. 12	Classes C & D	Tom Walkinshaw	BMW 530i
1978	Tricentrol British Saloon Car Championship, Rd. 12	Classes A & B	Richard Lloyd	Volkswagen Golf GTI
1979	Tricentrol British Saloon Car Championship, Rd.2	Classes C & D	Gordon Spice	Ford Capri III 3.0S
1979	Tricentrol British Saloon Car Championship, Rd.2	Classes A & B	John Morris	Volkswagen Golf GTI
1979	Tricentrol British Saloon Car Championship, Rd. 12	Classes C & D	Stuart Graham	Ford Capri III 3.0S
1979	Tricentrol British Saloon Car Championship, Rd. 12	Classes A & B	Richard Lloyd	Volkswagen Golf GTI
1980	Tricentrol British Saloon Car Championship, Rd. 2	Classes C & D	Gordon Spice	Ford Capri III 3.0S
1980	Tricentrol British Saloon Car Championship, Rd. 2	Classes A & B	Chris Hodgetts	Toyota Celica GT
1981	Tricentrol RAC British Saloon Car Championship, Rd. 3	Classes C & D	Win Percy	Rover 3500S
1981	Tricentrol RAC British Saloon Car Championship, Rd. 3	Classes A & B	Chris Hodgetts	Toyota Celica ST
1982	Tricentrol RAC British Saloon Car Championship, Rd. 3	Classes A & B	Gordon Spice	Ford Capri III 3.0S
1982	Tricentrol RAC British Saloon Car Championship, Rd. 3	Classes C & D	Win Percy	Toyota Corolla GT
1983	Trimoco RAC British Saloon Car Championship, Rd. 2		Jeff Allam	Rover Rover Vitesse
1984	Trimoco RAC British Saloon Car Championship, Rd. 3		James Weaver	BMW 635CSi
1985	Trimoco RAC British Saloon Car Championship, Rd. 2		Andy Rouse	Ford Sierra XR4Ti
1987	Dunlop RAC British Touring Car Championship, Rd. 2		Tim Harvey	Rover Vitesse
1987	Dunlop RAC British Touring Car Championship, Rd. 10		Mike Newman; Robert Speak	BMW 635CSi
1988	Dunlop RAC British Touring Car Championship, Rd. 2		Andy Rouse	Ford Sierra RS500
1989	Esso RAC British Touring Car Championship, Rd. 1		Robb Gravett	Ford Sierra RS500
1990	Esso RAC British Touring Car Championship, Rd. 1		Andy Rouse	Ford Sierra RS500
1990	Esso RAC British Touring Car Championship, Rd. 5		Robb Gravett	Ford Sierra RS500
1991	Esso RAC British Touring Car Championship, Rd. 9		John Cleland	Vauxhall Cavalier
1992	Esso RAC British Touring Car Championship, Rd. 3		Andy Rouse	Toyota Carina
1993	Auto Trader RAC British Touring Car Championship, Rd. 5		Joachim Winkelhock	BMW 318i
1993	International Gold Cup		Joachim Winkelhock	BMW 318i
1994	Auto Trader RAC British Touring Car Championship, Rd. 7		Alain Menu	Renault Laguna
1994	International Gold Cup		Joachim Winkelhock	BMW 318i
1995	Auto Trader RAC British Touring Car Championship, Rd. 9		Rickard Rydell	Volvo 850 20v
1995	Auto Trader RAC British Touring Car Championship, Rd. 10		Alain Menu	Renault Laguna
1995	Auto Trader RAC British Touring Car Championship, Rd. 22		Alain Menu	Renault Laguna
1995	Auto Trader RAC British Touring Car Championship, Rd. 23		Alain Menu	Renault Laguna
1996	Auto Trader RAC British Touring Car Championship, Rd. 9		Joachim Winkelhock	BMW 320i
1996	Auto Trader RAC British Touring Car Championship, Rd. 10		Rickard Rydell	Volvo 850 20v
1996	Auto Trader RAC British Touring Car Championship, Rd. 19		Alain Menu	Renault Laguna
1996	Auto Trader RAC British Touring Car Championship, Rd. 20		Frank Biela	Audi A4 quattro
1997	Auto Trader RAC British Touring Car Championship, Rd. 9		Alain Menu	Renault Laguna
1997	Auto Trader RAC British Touring Car Championship, Rd. 10		Alain Menu	Renault Laguna
1998	Auto Trader RAC British Touring Car Championship, Rd. 9		Alain Menu	Renault Laguna
1998	Auto Trader RAC British Touring Car Championship, Rd. 10		Jason Plato	Renault Laguna
1998	Auto Trader RAC British Touring Car Championship, Rd. 23		James Thompson	Honda Accord
1998	Auto Trader RAC British Touring Car Championship, Rd. 24		Anthony Reid	Nissan Primera GT
1999	Auto Trader RAC British Touring Car Championship, Rd. 9		Laurent Aïello	Nissan Primera GT
1999	Auto Trader RAC British Touring Car Championship, Rd. 10		Laurent Aïello	Nissan Primera GT
1999	Auto Trader RAC British Touring Car Championship, Rd. 23		Laurent Aïello	Nissan Primera GT
1999	Auto Trader RAC British Touring Car Championship, Rd. 24		James Thompson	Honda Accord
2000	Auto Trader RAC British Touring Car Championship, Rd. 9		Alain Menu	Ford Mondeo
2000	Auto Trader RAC British Touring Car Championship, Rd. 10		Tom Kristensen	Honda Accord
2000	Auto Trader RAC British Touring Car Championship, Rd. 21		Anthony Reid	Ford Mondeo
2000	Auto Trader RAC British Touring Car Championship, Rd. 22		Gabriele Tarquini	Honda Accord
2001	theAA.com MSA British Touring Car Championship, Rd. 5		Yvan Muller	Vauxhall Astra Coupé
2001	theAA.com MSA British Touring Car Championship, Rd. 6		Yvan Muller	Vauxhall Astra Coupé
2001	theAA.com MSA British Touring Car Championship, Rd. 19		Yvan Muller	Vauxhall Astra Coupé
2001	theAA.com MSA British Touring Car Championship, Rd. 20		Jason Plato	Vauxhall Astra Coupé
2002	Green Flag MSA British Touring Car Championship, Rd. 3		Yvan Muller	Vauxhall Astra Coupé
2002	Green Flag MSA British Touring Car Championship, Rd. 4		Paul O'Neill	Vauxhall Astra Coupé
2003	Green Flag MSA British Touring Car Championship, Rd. 19		James Thompson	Vauxhall Astra Coupé
2003	Green Flag MSA British Touring Car Championship, Rd. 20		Matt Neal	Honda Civic Type-R
2004	Green Flag MSA British Touring Car Championship, Rd. 10		Yvan Muller	Vauxhall Astra Coupé
2004	Green Flag MSA British Touring Car Championship, Rd. 11		Dan Eaves	Honda Civic Type-R
2004	Green Flag MSA British Touring Car Championship, Rd. 12		Yvan Muller	Vauxhall Astra Coupé
2005	Green Flag MSA British Touring Car Championship, Rd. 10		Jason Plato	SEAT Toledo Coupé
2005	Green Flag MSA British Touring Car Championship, Rd. 11		Matt Neal	Honda Integra Type-R
2005	Green Flag MSA British Touring Car Championship, Rd. 12		Tom Chilton	Honda Integra Type-R
2006	Dunlop MSA British Touring Car Championship, Rd. 7		Gordon Shedden	Honda Integra Type-R
2006	Dunlop MSA British Touring Car Championship, Rd. 8		Matt Neal	Honda Integra Type-R
2006	Dunlop MSA British Touring Car Championship, Rd. 9		Jason Plato	SEAT León
2007	Dunlop MSA British Touring Car Championship, Rd. 13		Gordon Shedden	Honda Civic
2007	Dunlop MSA British Touring Car Championship, Rd. 14		Colin Turkington	BMW 320si
2007	Dunlop MSA British Touring Car Championship, Rd. 9		Mat Jackson	BMW 320si
2008	HiQ MSA British Touring Car Championship, Rd. 19		Jason Plato	SEAT León TDI
2008	HiQ MSA British Touring Car Championship, Rd. 20		Colin Turkington	BMW 320si
2008	HiQ MSA British Touring Car Championship, Rd. 21		Gordon Shedden	Honda Civic
2009	HiQ MSA British Touring Car Championship, Rd. 10		Colin Turkington	BMW 320si
2009	HiQ MSA British Touring Car Championship, Rd. 11		Colin Turkington	BMW 320si
2009	HiQ MSA British Touring Car Championship, Rd. 12		James Thompson	Honda Civic
2010	Dunlop MSA British Touring Car Championship, Rd. 10		Tom Onslow-Cole	Ford Focus ST LPG
2010	Dunlop MSA British Touring Car Championship, Rd. 11		Jason Plato	Chevrolet Cruze
2010	Dunlop MSA British Touring Car Championship, Rd. 12		Matt Neal	Honda Civic
2011	Dunlop MSA British Touring Car Championship, Rd. 10		Gordon Shedden	Honda Civic
2011	Dunlop MSA British Touring Car Championship, Rd. 11		Jason Plato	Chevrolet Cruze LT
2011	Dunlop MSA British Touring Car Championship, Rd. 12		Mat Jackson	Ford Focus ST
2012	Dunlop MSA British Touring Car Championship, Rd. 10		Matt Neal	Honda Civic
2012	Dunlop MSA British Touring Car Championship, Rd. 11		Gordon Shedden	Honda Civic
2012	Dunlop MSA British Touring Car Championship, Rd. 12		Matt Neal	Honda Civic
2013	Dunlop MSA British Touring Car Championship, Rd. 10		Jason Plato	MG 6 GT
2013	Dunlop MSA British Touring Car Championship, Rd. 11		Jason Plato	MG 6 GT
2013	Dunlop MSA British Touring Car Championship, Rd. 12		Andrew Jordan	Honda Civic
2014	Dunlop MSA British Touring Car Championship, Rd. 10		Colin Turkington	BMW 125i M Sport
2014	Dunlop MSA British Touring Car Championship, Rd. 11		Colin Turkington	BMW 125i M Sport
2014	Dunlop MSA British Touring Car Championship, Rd. 12		Árón Smith	Volkswagen CC
2015	Dunlop MSA British Touring Car Championship, Rd. 10		Jason Plato	Volkswagen CC
2015	Dunlop MSA British Touring Car Championship, Rd. 11		Jason Plato	Volkswagen CC
2015	Dunlop MSA British Touring Car Championship, Rd. 12		Sam Tordoff	BMW 125i M Sport
2016	Dunlop MSA British Touring Car Championship, Rd. 10		Colin Turkington	Subaru Levorg GT
2016	Dunlop MSA British Touring Car Championship, Rd. 11		Sam Tordoff	BMW 125i M Sport
2016	Dunlop MSA British Touring Car Championship, Rd. 12		Matt Neal	Honda Civic Type R
2017	Dunlop MSA British Touring Car Championship, Rd. 10		Andrew Jordan	BMW 125i M Sport
2017	Dunlop MSA British Touring Car Championship, Rd. 11		Ashley Sutton	Subaru Levorg GT
2017	Dunlop MSA British Touring Car Championship, Rd. 12		Gordon Shedden	Honda Civic Type R
2018	Dunlop MSA British Touring Car Championship, Rd. 10		Matt Simpson	Civic Type R
2018	Dunlop MSA British Touring Car Championship, Rd. 11		Colin Turkington	BMW 125i M Sport
2018	Dunlop MSA British Touring Car Championship, Rd. 12		Rob Collard	BMW 125i M Sport
2019	Dunlop MSA British Touring Car Championship, Rd. 13		Colin Turkington	BMW 330i M Sport
2019	Dunlop MSA British Touring Car Championship, Rd. 14		Colin Turkington	BMW 330i M Sport
2019	Dunlop MSA British Touring Car Championship, Rd. 15		Stephen Jelley	BMW 125i M Sport
2020	Dunlop MSA British Touring Car Championship, Rd. 7		Dan Cammish	Honda Civic Type R
2020	Dunlop MSA British Touring Car Championship, Rd. 8		Ashley Sutton	Infiniti Q50
2020	Dunlop MSA British Touring Car Championship, Rd. 9		Rory Butcher	Ford Focus ST

=== British Superbike Championship ===
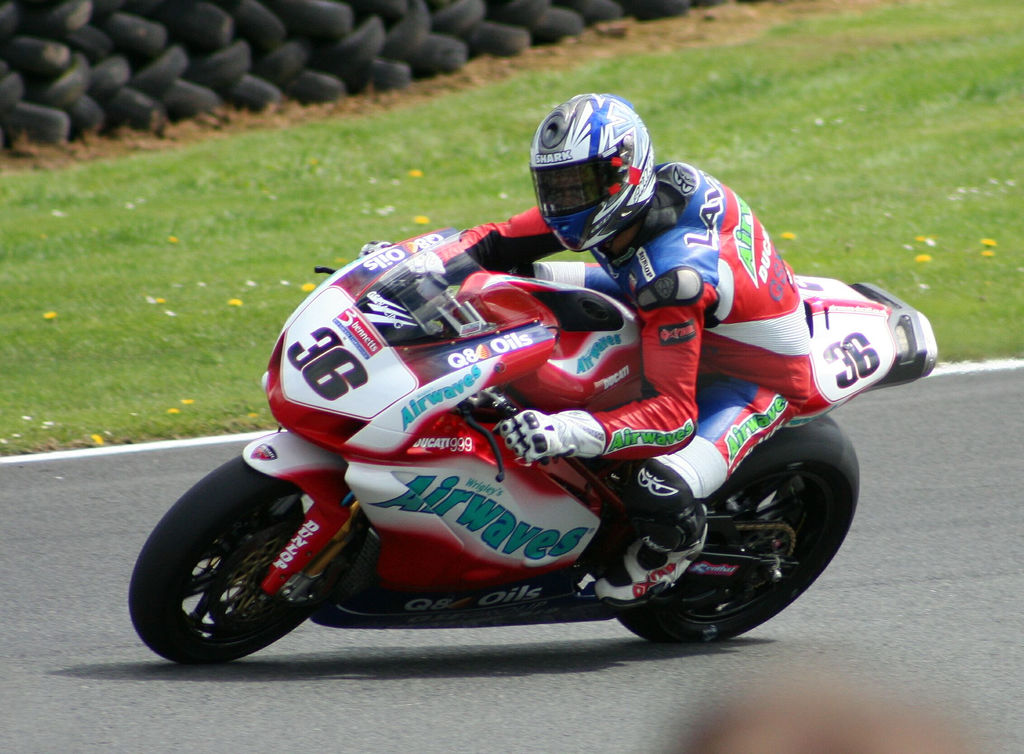
Gregorio Lavilla riding on the Airwaves Ducati at Oulton Park British Superbikes in May 2005.

Year	Race	Rider	Manufacturer
1991	1991 Shell Supercup/ACU British Championship, 750cc TT F1 Rd.9	Rob McElnea	750cc Yamaha 0W01
1991	1991 Shell Supercup/ACU British Championship, 750cc TT F1 Rd.10	Rob McElnea	750cc Yamaha 0W01
1992	1992 Motor Cycle News TT Superbike Challenge Rd.3	John Reynolds	750cc Kawasaki ZXR750R
1992	1992 Motor Cycle News TT Superbike Challenge Rd.4	John Reynolds	750cc Kawasaki ZXR750R
1992	1992 Motor Cycle News TT Supercup/ACU British Championship Rd.9	John Reynolds	750cc Kawasaki ZXR750R
1992	1992 Motor Cycle News TT Supercup/ACU British Championship Rd.10	John Reynolds	750cc Kawasaki ZXR750R
1993	1993 HEAT TT Superbike Supercup Rd.1	Jamie Whitham	750cc Yamaha YZF750
1993	1993 HEAT TT Superbike Supercup Rd.2	Jamie Whitham	750cc Yamaha YZF750
1993	1993 ACU TT Superbike British Championship Rd.13	Jamie Whitham	750cc Yamaha YZF750
1993	1993 ACU TT Superbike British Championship Rd.14	Jamie Whitham	750cc Yamaha YZF750
1994	1994 HEAT TT Superbike Supercup Rd.7	Ian Simpson	588cc Norton RFI 588
1994	1994 HEAT TT Superbike Supercup Rd.8	Ian Simpson	588cc Norton RFI 588
1994	1994 HEAT TT Superbike Supercup Rd.17	Phil Borley	588cc Norton RFI 588
1994	1994 HEAT TT Superbike Supercup Rd.18	Phil Borley	588cc Norton RFI 588
1995	1995 British Superbike Supercup Rd.5	Jamie Whitham	916cc Ducati 916
1995	1995 British Superbike Supercup Rd.6	Steve Hislop	916cc Ducati 916
1995	1995 Shell Advance International Superbike Trophy Rd.3	Jamie Whitham	916cc Ducati 916
1995	1995 Shell Advance International Superbike Trophy Rd.4	Steve Hislop	916cc Ducati 916
1996	1996 British Superbike Championship Rd.5	Jamie Whitham	750cc Yamaha YZF750
1996	1996 British Superbike Championship Rd.6	Terry Rymer	916cc Ducati 916
1997	1997 British Superbike Championship Rd.3	Chris Walker	750cc Yamaha YZF750
1997	1997 British Superbike Championship Rd.4	John Reynolds	916cc Ducati 916
1997	1997 British Superbike Championship Rd.11	Niall Mackenzie	750cc Yamaha YZF750
1997	1997 British Superbike Championship Rd.12	Niall Mackenzie	750cc Yamaha YZF750
1998	1998 British Superbike Championship Rd.3	Michael Rutter	900cc Honda CBR900RR
1998	1998 British Superbike Championship Rd.4	Steve Hislop	750cc Yamaha YZF750
1998	1998 British Superbike Championship Rd.11	Troy Bayliss	916cc Ducati 916
1998	1998 British Superbike Championship Rd.12	Sean Emmett	916cc Ducati 916
1999	1999 British Superbike Championship Rd.5	Troy Bayliss	996cc Ducati 996
1999	1999 British Superbike Championship Rd.6	Troy Bayliss	996cc Ducati 996
1999	1999 British Superbike Championship Rd.13	John Reynolds	996cc Ducati 996
1999	1999 British Superbike Championship Rd.14	Sean Emmett	996cc Ducati 996
2000	2000 British Superbike Championship Rd.7	Neil Hodgson	996cc Ducati 996
2000	2000 British Superbike Championship Rd.8	John Reynolds	996cc Ducati 996
2000	2000 British Superbike Championship Rd.13	Neil Hodgson	996cc Ducati 996
2000	2000 British Superbike Championship Rd.14	Chris Walker	750cc Suzuki GSX-R750
2001	2001 British Superbike Championship Rd.7	Steve Hislop	996cc Ducati 996 RS
2001	2001 British Superbike Championship Rd.8	Steve Hislop	996cc Ducati 996 RS
2001	2001 British Superbike Championship Rd.13	Steve Hislop	996cc Ducati 996 RS
2001	2001 British Superbike Championship Rd.14	Steve Hislop	996cc Ducati 996 RS
2002	2002 British Superbike Championship Rd.7	Steve Hislop	996cc Ducati 996 RS
2002	2002 British Superbike Championship Rd.8	Michael Rutter	996cc Ducati 996 RS
2002	2002 British Superbike Championship Rd.21	Steve Hislop	996cc Ducati 996 RS
2002	2002 British Superbike Championship Rd.22	Steve Plater	996cc Ducati 996 RS
2003	2003 British Superbike Championship Rd.7	Shane Byrne	998cc Ducati 998 FO2
2003	2003 British Superbike Championship Rd.8	Shane Byrne	998cc Ducati 998 FO2
2003	2003 British Superbike Championship Rd.17	Steve Plater	954cc Honda CBR954RR
2003	2003 British Superbike Championship Rd.18	Yukio Kagayama	999cc Suzuki GSX-R1000
2004	2004 British Superbike Championship Rd.7	Yukio Kagayama	999cc Suzuki GSX-R1000
2004	2004 British Superbike Championship Rd.8	Yukio Kagayama	999cc Suzuki GSX-R1000
2004	2004 British Superbike Championship Rd.23	John Reynolds	999cc Suzuki GSX-R1000
2004	2004 British Superbike Championship Rd.24	John Reynolds	999cc Suzuki GSX-R1000
2005	2005 British Superbike Championship Rd.7	Michael Rutter	999cc Honda CBR1000RR
2005	2005 British Superbike Championship Rd.8	Leon Haslam	999cc Ducati 999 F04
2005	2005 British Superbike Championship Rd.21	Ryuichi Kiyonari	999cc Honda CBR1000RR
2005	2005 British Superbike Championship Rd.22	Ryuichi Kiyonari	999cc Honda CBR1000RR
2006	2006 British Superbike Championship Rd.7	Gregorio Lavilla	999cc Ducati 999 F04
2006	2006 British Superbike Championship Rd.8	Gregorio Lavilla	999cc Ducati 999 F04
2006	2006 British Superbike Championship Rd.15	Ryuichi Kiyonari	999cc Honda CBR1000RR
2006	2006 British Superbike Championship Rd.16	Ryuichi Kiyonari	999cc Honda CBR1000RR
2007	2007 British Superbike Championship Rd.7	Ryuichi Kiyonari	999cc Honda CBR1000RR
2007	2007 British Superbike Championship Rd.8	Ryuichi Kiyonari	999cc Honda CBR1000RR
2007	2007 British Superbike Championship Rd.15	Ryuichi Kiyonari	999cc Honda CBR1000RR
2007	2007 British Superbike Championship Rd.16	Jonathan Rea	999cc Honda CBR1000RR
2008	2008 British Superbike Championship Rd.3	Shane Byrne	1099cc Ducati 1098R
2008	2008 British Superbike Championship Rd.4	Shane Byrne	1099cc Ducati 1098R
2008	2008 British Superbike Championship Rd.13	Tom Sykes	999cc Suzuki GSX-R1000
2008	2008 British Superbike Championship Rd.14	Tom Sykes	999cc Suzuki GSX-R1000
2009	2009 British Superbike Championship Rd.3	Leon Camier	999cc Yamaha YZF-R1
2009	2009 British Superbike Championship Rd.4	Leon Camier	999cc Yamaha YZF-R1
2009	2009 British Superbike Championship Rd.24	Stuart Easton	999cc Honda CBR1000RR
2009	2009 British Superbike Championship Rd.25	Leon Camier	999cc Yamaha YZF-R1
2009	2009 British Superbike Championship Rd.26	Leon Camier	999cc Yamaha YZF-R1
2010	2010 British Superbike Championship Rd.5	Stuart Easton	999cc Honda CBR1000RR
2010	2010 British Superbike Championship Rd.6	Michael Laverty	999cc Suzuki GSX-R1000
2010	2010 British Superbike Championship Rd.24	Ryuichi Kiyonari	999cc Honda CBR1000RR
2010	2010 British Superbike Championship Rd.25	Ryuichi Kiyonari	999cc Honda CBR1000RR
2010	2010 British Superbike Championship Rd.26	Ryuichi Kiyonari	999cc Honda CBR1000RR
2011	2011 British Superbike Championship Rd.3	Ryuichi Kiyonari	999cc Honda CBR1000RR
2011	2011 British Superbike Championship Rd.4	John Hopkins	999cc Suzuki GSX-R1000
2011	2011 British Superbike Championship Rd.13	Tommy Hill	999cc Yamaha YZF-R1
2011	2011 British Superbike Championship Rd.14	Cancelled due to poor weather	
2012	2012 British Superbike Championship Rd.4	Tommy Hill	999cc Yamaha YZF-R1
2012	2012 British Superbike Championship Rd.5	Chris Walker	999cc Kawasaki ZX-10R
2012	2012 British Superbike Championship Rd.6	Shane Byrne	999cc Kawasaki ZX-10R
2012	2012 British Superbike Championship Rd.11	Tommy Hill	999cc Yamaha YZF-R1
2012	2012 British Superbike Championship Rd.12	Tommy Hill	999cc Yamaha YZF-R1
2012	2012 British Superbike Championship Rd.13	Tommy Hill	999cc Yamaha YZF-R1
2013	2013 British Superbike Championship Rd.5	Alex Lowes	999cc Honda CBR1000RR
2013	2013 British Superbike Championship Rd.6	Shane Byrne	999cc Kawasaki ZX-10R
2013	2013 British Superbike Championship Rd.13	James Ellison	999cc Yamaha YZF-R1
2013	2013 British Superbike Championship Rd.14	Shane Byrne	999cc Kawasaki ZX-10R
2013	2013 British Superbike Championship Rd.15	Josh Brookes	999cc Suzuki GSX-R1000
2014	2014 British Superbike Championship Rd.3	Shane Byrne	999cc Kawasaki ZX-10R
2014	2014 British Superbike Championship Rd.4	Josh Brookes	999cc Yamaha YZF-R1
2015	MCE British Superbike Championship Rd.3 Race 1	Tommy Bridewell	999cc BMW S1000RR
2015	MCE British Superbike Championship Rd.3 Race 2	Richard Cooper	999cc Kawasaki ZX-10R
2015	MCE British Superbike Championship Rd.9 Race 1	Shane Byrne	999cc Kawasaki ZX-10R
2015	MCE British Superbike Championship Rd.9 Race 2	Josh Brookes	999cc Yamaha YZF-R1
2015	MCE British Superbike Championship Rd.9 Race 3	Shane Byrne	999cc Kawasaki ZX-10R
2016	MCE British Superbike Championship Rd.2 Race 1	Leon Haslam	999cc Kawasaki Ninja ZX-10R
2016	MCE British Superbike Championship Rd.2 Race 2	Richard Cooper	999cc BMW S1000RR
2017	MCE British Superbike Championship Rd.3 Race 1	Leon Haslam	999cc Kawasaki Ninja ZX-10R
2017	MCE British Superbike Championship Rd.3 Race 2	Shane Byrne	1198cc Ducati 1199
2017	MCE British Superbike Championship Rd.10 Race 1	Leon Haslam	999cc Kawasaki Ninja ZX-10R
2017	MCE British Superbike Championship Rd.10 Race 2	Dan Linfoot	998cc Honda CBR1000RR
