= Oulton Park International Gold Cup =

The International Gold Cup is a prize awarded annually to the winner of a motor race held at the Oulton Park circuit, Cheshire, England. In the 1950s and 1960s it formed one of a number of highly regarded non-Championship Formula One races, which regularly attracted top drivers and teams. With the increasing cost of F1, the number of non-Championship events dwindled and the Gold Cup fell by the wayside in the mid-1970s. After this time the Cup was open to Formula 5000 cars, then Formula 3000 cars, before finally being reduced to a courtesy award made for the winner of the race deemed "highlight of the weekend". The Cup proper was reinstated by the Historic Sports Car Club in 2003, for the winner of a race for historic F1 cars at the same circuit.

The Oulton Park circuit opened in 1953 and the first Gold Cup meeting was held the following year. As a sign of things to come Stirling Moss won both the first and second events; he would go on to win the Gold Cup a further three times before an accident prematurely ended his career. Perhaps appropriately it was Moss that was at the wheel when the Ferguson P99 took the first ever victory by a four-wheel drive F1 car and the last victory for a front-engined F1 car, in the 1961 Gold Cup race. Other famous winners include Jack Brabham and Denny Hulme.

== Winners ==
Year	Driver	Constructor	Championship/Class	Report
2004	(United Kingdom) Barry Williams	Aston Martin DBR4	Historic racing	Report
2003	(United Kingdom) Martin O'Connell	Lotus-Cosworth	Historic racing	Report
2002			Historic racing	Report
2001	(United Kingdom) Tim Harvey (United Kingdom) Rob Wilson	Chrysler Viper GTS-R	British GT Championship	Report
2000	(United Kingdom) Tim Harvey (United Kingdom) Mike Youles	Porsche 911 GT2	British GT Championship	Report
1999	(United Kingdom) Julian Bailey (United Kingdom) Jamie Campbell-Walter	Lister Storm	British GT Championship	Report
1997–98	Not held			
1996	(United Kingdom) Gareth Rees	Reynard-Cosworth	British Formula 2	Report
1995	Not held			
1994	(Germany) Joachim Winkelhock	BMW 318i	BTCC	Report
1993	(Germany) Joachim Winkelhock	BMW 318i	BTCC	Report
1992	(France) Yvan Muller	Reynard-Cosworth	British Formula 2	Report
1991	(United Kingdom) Paul Warwick	Reynard-Cosworth	British F3000	Report
1990	(United Kingdom) Richard Dean	Reynard-Cosworth	British F3000	Report
1989	(Brazil) Paolo Carcasci	Reynard-Cosworth	British F3000	Report
1988	(Australia) Gary Brabham	Ralt-Volkswagen	British Formula 3	Report
1987	(United Kingdom) David Leslie (United Kingdom) Mike Wilds	Lola-Chevrolet	Thundersports	Report
1986	(United Kingdom) John Foulston (United Kingdom) John Brindley	Lola-Chevrolet	Thundersports	Report
1985	(United Kingdom) Tim Lee-Davey (Australia) Neil Crang	Tiga GC84-Cosworth	Thundersports	Report
1984	(United Kingdom) John Foulston (United Kingdom) John Brindley	Lola-Chevrolet	Thundersports	Report
1983	(United Kingdom) Richard Budge (United Kingdom) Vin Malkie	Chevron-Ford	Thundersports	Report
1982	(United Kingdom) Tony Trimmer	Fittipaldi-Ford	British Formula One Championship	Report
1981	(United Kingdom) John Surtees	Maserati	Historic racing	Report
1980	(United Kingdom) Guy Edwards	Arrows-Ford	Aurora F1	Report
1979	(Republic of Ireland) David Kennedy	Wolf-Ford	Aurora F1	Report
1978	(United Kingdom) Tony Trimmer	McLaren-Ford	Aurora F1	Report
1977	(United Kingdom) Tony Trimmer	Surtees-Ford	Shellsport Group 8	Report
1976	(United Kingdom) Guy Edwards	Brabham-Ford	Shellsport Group 8	Report
1975	(United Kingdom) David Purley	Chevron-Ford	British F5000	Report
1974	(United Kingdom) Ian Ashley	Lola-Chevrolet	British F5000	Report
1973	(United Kingdom) Peter Gethin	Chevron-Chevrolet	British F5000	Report
1972	(New Zealand) Denny Hulme	McLaren-Cosworth	Non-championship F1	Report
1971	(United Kingdom) John Surtees	Surtees-Cosworth	Non-championship F1 plus Rothmans European Formula 5000 Championship	Report
1970	(United Kingdom) John Surtees	Surtees-Cosworth	Non-championship F1	Report
1969	(Belgium) Jacky Ickx	Brabham-Cosworth	Non-championship F1	Report
1968	(United Kingdom) Jackie Stewart	Matra-Cosworth	Non-championship F1	Report
1967	(Australia) Jack Brabham	Brabham-Repco	Non-championship F1	Report
1966	(Australia) Jack Brabham	Brabham-Repco	Non-championship F1	Report
1965	(United Kingdom) John Surtees	Lola-Cosworth	Formula 2	Report
1964	(Australia) Jack Brabham	Brabham-Cosworth	Formula 2	Report
1963	(United Kingdom) Jim Clark	Lotus-Climax	Non-championship F1	Report
1962	(United Kingdom) Jim Clark	Lotus-Climax	Non-championship F1	Report
1961	(United Kingdom) Stirling Moss	Ferguson-Climax	Non-championship F1	Report
1960	(United Kingdom) Stirling Moss	Lotus-Climax	Non-championship F1	Report
1959	(United Kingdom) Stirling Moss	Cooper-Climax	Non-championship F1	Report
1958	(United Kingdom) Roy Salvadori	Lotus-Climax	Sports car racing	Report
1957	(Australia) Jack Brabham	Cooper-Climax	Formula 2	Report
1956	(United Kingdom) Roy Salvadori	Cooper-Climax	Formula 2/1.5 L sportscars	Report
1955	(United Kingdom) Stirling Moss	Maserati	Non-championship F1	Report
1954	(United Kingdom) Stirling Moss	Maserati	Non-championship F1	Report
