= 1967 International Gold Cup =

- Non-championship race in the 1967 Formula One season

Race details
- Date: 16 September 1967
- Official name: XIV Gold Cup
- Location: Oulton Park, Cheshire
- Course: Permanent racing facility
- Course length: 4.4434 km (2.761 miles)
- Distance: 45 laps, 199.98 km (124.26 miles)

Pole position
Driver	(Australia) Jack Brabham	Brabham-Repco
- Time: 1:30.6

Fastest lap
Driver	(Australia) Jack Brabham	Brabham-Repco
- Time: 1:31.6

Podium
First	(Australia) Jack Brabham	Brabham-Repco
Second	(United Kingdom) Jackie Stewart	Matra-Cosworth
Third	(United Kingdom) Graham Hill	Lotus-Cosworth

The 14th Gold Cup was a Formula One non-championship race held at Oulton Park on 16 September 1967. The race was run over 45 laps of the circuit, and was won by Australian driver Jack Brabham in a Brabham BT24.

Only two Formula 1 cars were entered. The majority of the field was made up of Formula 2 cars. Jackie Stewart was first placed F2 runner, and second overall, in a Matra-Cosworth.

== Results ==
Note: a dark blue background indicates a Formula One entrant.

Pos	No.	Driver	Entrant	Constructor	Time/Retired	Grid
1	1	(Australia) Jack Brabham	Brabham Racing Organisation	Brabham-Repco	1.10.07.0	1
2	11	(United Kingdom) Jackie Stewart	Tyrrell Racing Organisation	Matra-Cosworth	+ 5.4 s	2
3	3	(United Kingdom) Graham Hill	Team Lotus	Lotus-Cosworth	+ 47.4 s	8
4	12	(France) Jo Schlesser	Ford (France)	Matra-Cosworth	+ 48.0 s	7
5	14	(France) Jean-Pierre Beltoise	Matra Sports	Matra-Cosworth	+ 1.00.6 s	9
6	21	(Austria) Jochen Rindt	Roy Winkelmann Racing	Brabham-Cosworth	+ 1.03.4 s	3
7	22	(United Kingdom) Alan Rees	Roy Winkelmann Racing	Brabham-Cosworth	44 laps	6
8	15	(France) Henri Pescarolo	Matra Sports	Matra-Cosworth	44 laps	12
9	23	(United Kingdom) Alan Rollinson	Frank Lythgoe Racing	McLaren-Cosworth	43 laps	13
10	5	(United Kingdom) George Pitt	George Pitt	Brabham-Climax	42 laps	18
11	24	(United Kingdom) Harry Stiller	Bob Gerard Racing	Cooper-Cosworth	42 laps	17
12	25	(United Kingdom) John Cardwell	Bob Gerard Racing	Cooper-Cosworth	42 laps	16
13	20	(United Kingdom) Chris Lambert	P & M Racing Preparations	Brabham-Cosworth	42 laps - out of fuel	14
Ret	16	(United Kingdom) Jackie Oliver	Team Lotus	Lotus-Cosworth	28 laps - gear selector	11
Ret	10	(Belgium) Jacky Ickx	Tyrrell Racing Organisation	Matra-Cosworth	27 laps - engine	5
Ret	2	(Australia) Frank Gardner	Brabham Racing Organisation	Brabham-Repco	10 laps - ignition	4
Ret	17	(United Kingdom) Robin Widdows	Witley Racing Syndicate	Brabham-Cosworth	2 laps - throttle	15
Ret	19	(United Kingdom) Brian Redman	David Bridges	Lola-Cosworth	2 laps - engine	10

Previous race: 1967 Syracuse Grand Prix	Formula One non-championship races 1967 season	Next race: 1967 Spanish Grand Prix
Previous race: 1966 International Gold Cup	Oulton Park International Gold Cup	Next race: 1968 International Gold Cup
