= Cooper T71 =

British Formula 2 car

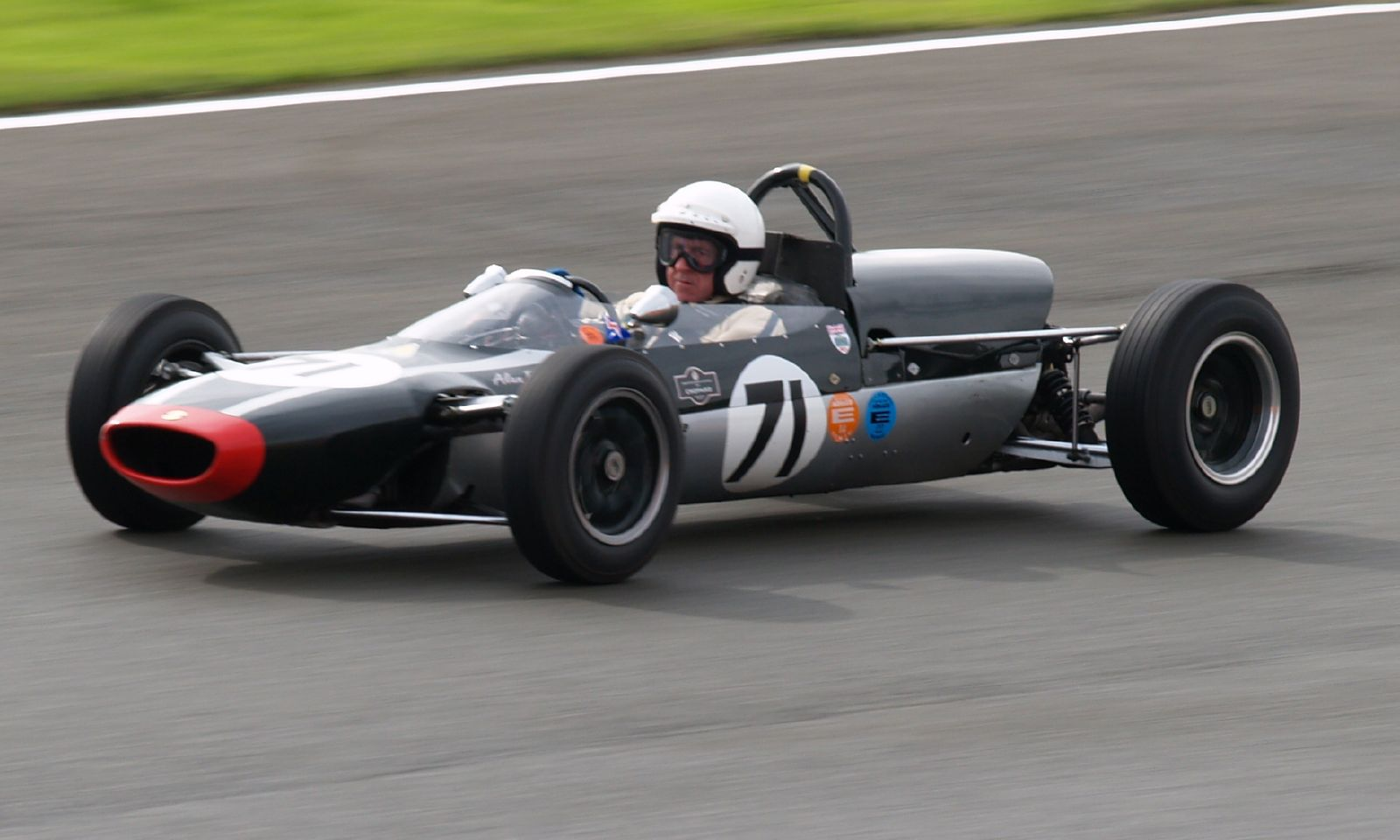
The T71/73 hybrid

The Cooper T71 is a Formula 2 car built by Cooper Cars in 1964. It used a 1,500 cc (92 cu in) Ford-Cosworth SCA engine, rated at 175 hp (130 kW). A hybrid version, called the T71/73, was a combination between the T71 F2 car, and the Cooper T73 F1 car.
