= Lola T54 =

Open-wheel Formula Two race car

- Category: Formula Two
- Constructor: Lola
- Designer(s): Eric Broadley

Technical specifications
- Chassis: Glass-fiber reinforced plastic panels bodywork, tube frame
- Suspension: Double wishbones, telescopic shock absorbers, co-axial coil springs, anti-roll bar
- Axle track: 53 in (1,346.2 mm) (front and rear)
- Wheelbase: 88 in (2,235.2 mm)
- Engine: Ford-Cosworth SCA 1.0 L (61.0 cu in) I4 naturally-aspirated Mid-engined
- Transmission: Hewland Mk.5 6-speed manual
- Power: 120 hp (89 kW)
- Weight: 420 kg (926 lb)

Competition history

The Lola T54 was an open-wheel formula race car, designed, developed, and built by British manufacturer Lola Cars, for Formula Two racing, in 1964.
