= Yamaha YZF750 =

Yamaha YZF750R/SP
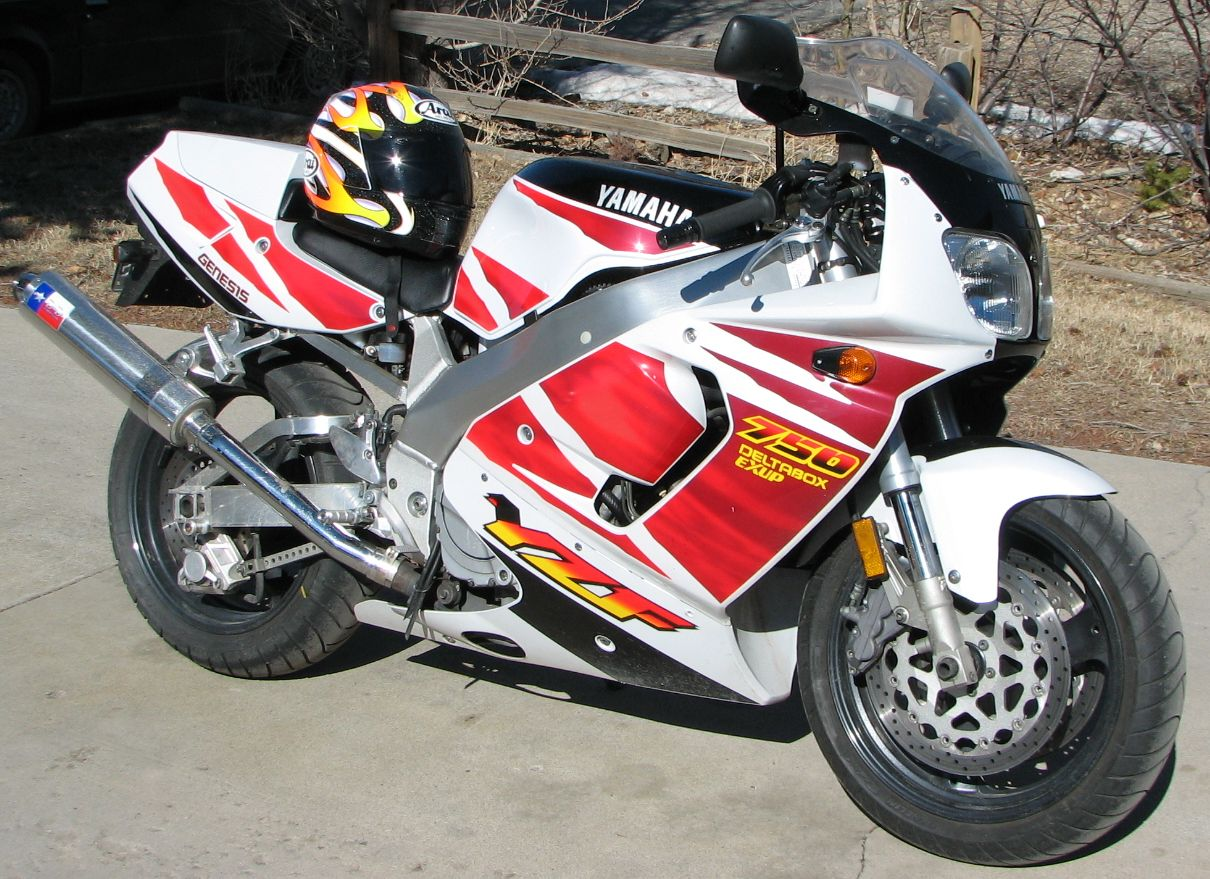
- Manufacturer: Yamaha
- Production: 1993-1998 (R); 1993-1997 (SP)
- Predecessor: Yamaha FZR750R
- Successor: Yamaha YZF-R7
- Class: Sport bike
- Engine: 749 cc (45.7 cu in) inline 4 cylinder liquid-cooled 4-stroke 20-valve DOHC
- Bore / stroke: 72.0 mm × 46.0 mm (2.8 in × 1.8 in)
- Power: 120 hp (89 kW) @ 12,000 rpm 84.7 kW (113.6 hp) @ 11,800 rpm (rear Tyre)
- Torque: 80.4 N⋅m (59.3 lb⋅ft) @ 9,500 rpm
- Transmission: 6-speed sequential
- Rake, trail: 24.0 degrees, 97 mm (3.8")
- Wheelbase: 1,420 mm (55.9")
- Dimensions: L: 2,160 mm W: 730 mm
- Seat height: 770 mm
- Weight: 196 kg (dry); 224 kg (494 lb) (wet)
- Fuel capacity: 19 litres(5.0 gal)

The Yamaha YZF750 is a motorcycle that was produced from 1993 to 1998 in two forms, the standard R and the homologation model single seat SP. The 750R was the only version sold in the US.

== R Model (US) ==
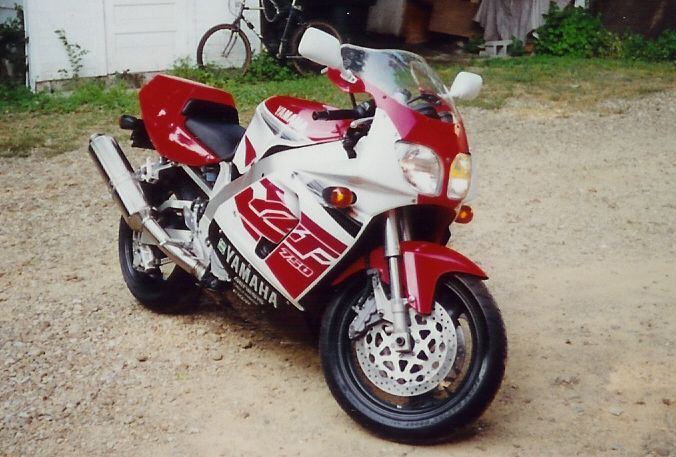
1997 YZF750R (US)

The Yamaha YZF750R was introduced into the United States in early 1994. A 1996 model was an early factory release in 1995. This model was Sport Rider Magazines 1995 Bike of the Year. The 1997 and 1998 models are identical.

== SP Model ==
Mechanically the later SP differed from the R in the following areas: adjustable swingarm pivot position, 39 mm Keihin FCR flatslide carburetors, a lower screen, a non removable rear subframe and a single seat. The primary drive, gear box and final drive ratios are different on the SP. The rear suspension unit is different and vastly improved for the earlier SP however the R from 1996 also had the Ohlins rear shock. The SP was the homologation model of the Yamaha YZF750 for the World Superbike Championship before the rules changed to allow 1000cc bikes. The bike won the Suzuka 8 Hours endurance race four times between 1987 and 1996.

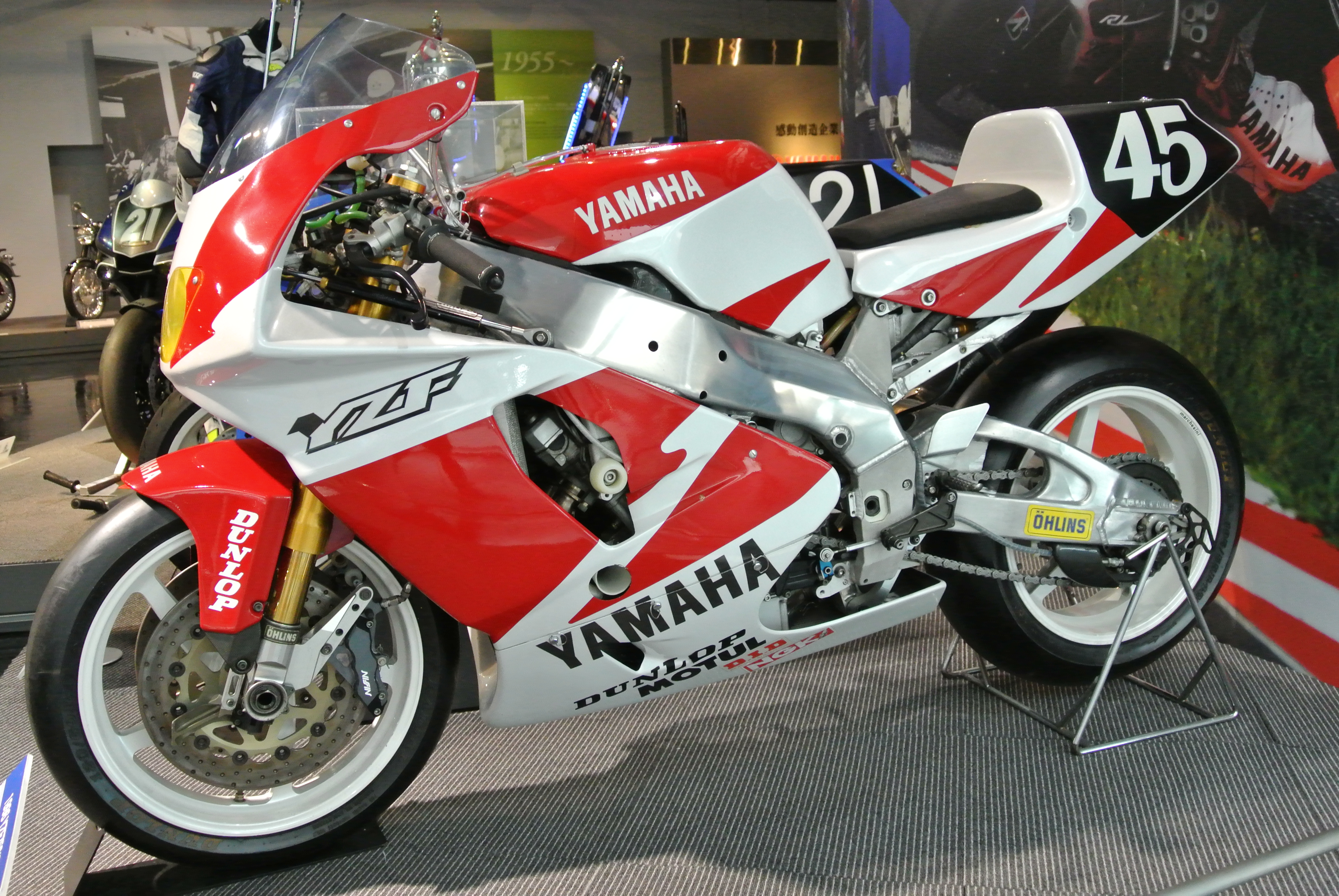
1996 Yamaha YZF750-SP
