= Bill Baker =

Bill or Billy Baker may refer to:

== People ==
- Bill Baker (baseball) (1911–2006), American baseball catcher
- Bill Baker (Canadian football) (born 1944), Canadian football player
- Bill Baker (ice hockey, born 1882) (1882–1916), Canadian hockey player
- Bill Baker (ice hockey, born 1956), American hockey player
- Bill Baker (racing driver) (1931–1978), American NASCAR driver
- Billy Jim Baker, American professional clown and songwriter
- Bill John Baker (born 1952), Principal Chief of the Cherokee Nation
- Billy Baker (footballer, born 1892) (1892–1980), English professional footballer
- Billy Baker (footballer, born 1894) (1894–1972), English professional footballer
- Billy Baker (footballer, born 1905) (1905–1975), English professional footballer
- Billy Baker (footballer, born 1920) (1920–2005), Welsh professional footballer
- Billy Baker (musician), former member of the Del McCoury Band
- Billy Baker (boxer) (1894–?), English professional boxer
- Wilfred Baker (1920–2000), known as Bill, British Conservative MP
- William F. Baker (engineer) (born 1953), known as Bill, American structural engineer
- Bill Baker (politician) (born 1940), U.S. representative from California
- William F. Baker (television) (born 1942), American public television executive

== Fiction ==
- Billy Baker, in the 1994 US comedy-drama film Andre, played by Keith Szarabajka
- Billy Baker, in the US sports drama TV series All American, played by Taye Diggs

== See also ==
- William Baker (disambiguation)
