= 1975 Long Beach Grand Prix =

(United States) 1975 Long Beach Grand Prix
Race details
- Race 7 of 9 in the 1975 SCCA/USAC Formula 5000 Championship season
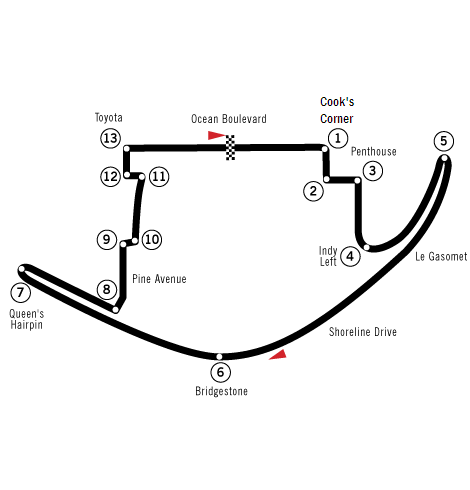
- Date: September 28, 1975
- Official name: Long Beach Grand Prix
- Location: Long Beach, California, United States
- Course: Temporary street course 2.02 mi / 3.25 km
- Distance: 50 laps 101 mi / 162.5 km
- Weather: Temperatures up to 73.9 °F (23.3 °C); wind speeds up to 9.9 miles per hour (15.9 km/h)

Pole position
- Driver: (United Kingdom) Tony Brise (Theodore Racing)

Fastest lap
- Driver: (United Kingdom) Tony Brise (Theodore Racing)
- Time: 1:19.905 (on lap of 50)

Podium
- First: (United Kingdom) Brian Redman (Haas Racing)
- Second: (Australia) Vern Schuppan (Jorgensen AAR)
- Third: (Canada) Eppie Wietzes (Formula Racing)

Chronology
Next
1976

The 1975 Long Beach Grand Prix was the inaugural running of the Grand Prix of Long Beach. The race was held September 28, 1975, on a 2.020 mi (3.251 km) temporary street circuit. It was race 7 of the 1975 SCCA/USAC Formula 5000 Championship. An estimated 65,000 spectators saw Englishman Brian Redman win the race from Australian Vern Schuppan, with Canadian driver Eppie Wietzes finishing third.

== Background ==
In 1974 the city of Long Beach began a billion-dollar redevelopment program of the downtown area. Chris Pook, a British travel agent working in Long Beach, proposed holding a street course race in the vein of the Monaco Grand Prix. In order to prepare for a Formula One race the following year, the organizers decided to hold a Formula 5000 race in Long Beach.

== Qualifying ==
Qualifying times were set in two sessions on Saturday. Seeded drivers had one 45-minute session and one 1 hour, 15 minute session, while non-seeded drivers had two 45-minute sessions. Starting positions were set by two heat races, with the finishers from Heat 1 starting in odd positions and Heat 2 in even positions.

Pos	Driver	Team	Car	Time
1	(United States) Mario Andretti	Vel's Parnelli Jones Racing	Lola T332-Chevrolet	1:21.297
2	(United States) Al Unser	Vel's Parnelli Jones Racing	Lola T332-Chevrolet	1:21.948
3	(United Kingdom) Tony Brise	Theodore Racing	Lola T332-Chevrolet	1:22.036
4	(United Kingdom) Jackie Oliver	Phoenix Racing	Shadow DN6-Dodge	1:22.799
5	(United Kingdom) Tom Pryce	Phoenix Racing	Shadow DN6-Dodge	1:23.346
6	(United Kingdom) Brian Redman	Carl A. Haas Racing	Lola T332-Chevrolet	1:23.602
7	(Australia) Vern Schuppan	All American Racers	Eagle 755-Chevrolet	1:23.674
8	(New Zealand) Graham McRae	Eddie Lewis	Lola T332-Chevrolet	1:24.039
9	(United States) Elliott Forbes-Robinson	Francisco Mir Racing	Lola T332-Chevrolet	1:24.091
10	(South Africa) Jody Scheckter	Hogan Racing	Lola T332-Chevrolet	1:24.168
11	(United States) John Gunn	Racing Consultants	Lola T332-Chevrolet	1:24.204
12	(Canada) Eppie Wietzes	Formula Racing	Lola T400-Chevrolet	1:24.223
13	(United States) Gordon Johncock	Patrick Racing	Lola T332-Chevrolet	1:24.264
14	(United Kingdom) David Hobbs	Hogan Racing	Lola T330-Chevrolet	1:24.491
15	(United States) Jon Woodner	Interscope Racing	Talon MR-1A-Chevrolet	1:24.817
16	(Canada) John Cannon	Anglo American Racing	March 73A-Chevrolet	1:24.909
17	(United States) John Morton	Krinitt Racing	Lola T332-Chevrolet	1:25.347
18	(United States) Brett Lunger	Chris Oates, Ltd.	Lola T332-Chevrolet	1:25.529
19	(Australia) Warwick Brown	McCormack/Burke Racing	Talon MR-1A-Chevrolet	1:25.734
20	(United States) Danny Ongais	Interscope Racing	Lola T332-Chevrolet	1:26.090
21	(United States) Bob Earl	T. P. Racing	Lola T330-Chevrolet	1:26.183
22	(United States) Evan Noyes	Evan Noyes	Lola T332-Chevrolet	1:26.357
23	(United States) John Korn	Jomar Racing	Lola T330-Chevrolet	1:26.846
24	(United States) George Follmer	Lance Smith Racing	Lance LSR1-Chevrolet	1:26.947
25	(United States) Randy Lewis	Wrangler Wracing Team	Lola T332-Chevrolet	1:26.966
26	(New Zealand) Chris Amon	McCormack/Burke Racing	Talon MR-1A-Chevrolet	1:27.167
27	(United States) Tuck Thomas	Lancer Stores	Lola T332-Chevrolet	1:27.574
28	(United States) Benny Scott	Black American Racers	Lola T332-Chevrolet	1:27.645
29	(United States) Bob Nagel	Nagel Racing	Lola T332-Chevrolet	1:28.562
30	(United States) Roger Bighouse	Roger Bighouse	Chevron B24-Chevrolet	1:28.570
31	(United States) John David Briggs	Briggs & Fodge Racing	Lola T332-Chevrolet	1:28.650
32	(United States) John Benton	Formula Magazine	Lola T332-Chevrolet	1:29.252
33	Bob Allen	Manteca Motors	Eagle 74A-Chevrolet	1:29.743
34	(United States) Arlon Koops	Solazure IV, Ltd.	Lola T330-Chevrolet	1:29.801
35	(United States) Michael Brockman	J. Levitt	Talon MR-1A-Chevrolet	1:30.086
36	(United States) Bill Baker	Barbara Baker	Lola T332-Chevrolet	1:31.310
37	(United States) Bill Simpson	E. J. Simpson	Berta Argentina BA-3-Chevrolet	1:31.894
38	(United States) Skeeter McKitterick	AME Racing	Chevron B24-Chevrolet	1:31.952
39	Gary Wilson	Sting Racing	Lola T332-Chevrolet	1:33.219
40	(United States) Ron Dykes	J. B. Quality Products	Lola T192-Chevrolet	1:33.496
41	(United States) Jim Gustafson	Jim Gustafson Racing	March 73A-Chevrolet	1:36.831
42	(United States) Michael Brayton	Ill-Eagle	Eagle Mk.5-Chevrolet	1:37.730
43	(Canada) Garth Pollard	G. W. Pollard	Lola T330-Chevrolet	1:38.810
44	Steve Durst	J. Levitt	Talon MR-1A-Chevrolet	2:05.826

=== Heat races ===
==== Heat 1 ====
Pos	No	Driver	Team	Car	Laps	Time/Retired	Grid
1	64	(United Kingdom) Tony Brise	Theodore Racing	Lola T332-Chevrolet	12	16:32.444	2
2	5	(United States) Mario Andretti	Vel's Parnelli Jones Racing	Lola T332-Chevrolet	12	Finished	1
3	00	(United Kingdom) Tom Pryce	Phoenix Racing	Shadow DN6-Dodge	12	Finished	3
4	48	(Australia) Vern Schuppan	All American Racers	Eagle 755-Chevrolet	12	Finished	4
5	33	(United States) Elliott Forbes-Robinson	Francisco Mir Racing	Lola T332-Chevrolet	12	Finished	5
6	4	(Australia) Warwick Brown	McCormack/Burke Racing	Talon MR-1A-Chevrolet	12	Finished	10
7	91	(United States) Jon Woodner	Interscope Racing	Talon MR-1A-Chevrolet	12	Finished	8
8	28	(United States) Randy Lewis	Wrangler Wracing Team	Lola T332-Chevrolet	12	Finished	13
9	19	(United States) Bob Earl	T. P. Racing	Lola T330-Chevrolet	12	Finished	11
10	20	(United States) Gordon Johncock	Patrick Racing	Lola T332-Chevrolet	12	Finished	7
11	50	(United States) John Korn	Jomar Racing	Lola T330-Chevrolet	12	Finished	12
12	75	(United States) Bob Nagel	Nagel Racing	Lola T332-Chevrolet	12	Finished	15
13	71	(United States) John David Briggs	Briggs & Fodge Racing	Lola T332-Chevrolet	12	Finished	16
14	69	(United States) Michael Brockman	J. Levitt	Talon MR-1A-Chevrolet	12	Finished	18
15	97	Bob Allen	Manteca Motors	Eagle 74A-Chevrolet	11	+ 1 lap	17
16	46	(United States) John Morton	Krinitt Racing	Lola T332-Chevrolet	11	+ 1 lap	9
17	8	Gary Wilson	Sting Racing	Lola T332-Chevrolet	9	Retired	20
18	26	(United States) Michael Brayton	Ill-Eagle	Eagle Mk.5-Chevrolet	7	Retired	21
19	39	(United States) John Gunn	Racing Consultants	Lola T332-Chevrolet		Retired	6
20	96	Steve Durst	J. Levitt	Talon MR-1A-Chevrolet		Retired	22
DNS	88	(United States) Tuck Thomas	Lancer Stores	Lola T332-Chevrolet		Did not start	
DNS	65	(United States) Bill Simpson	E. J. Simpson	Berta BA-3-Chevrolet		Did not start	

==== Heat 2 ====
Pos	No	Driver	Team	Car	Laps	Time/Retired	Grid
1	51	(United States) Al Unser	Vel's Parnelli Jones Racing	Lola T332-Chevrolet	12	16:30.391	1
2	1	(United Kingdom) Brian Redman	Carl A. Haas Racing	Lola T332-Chevrolet	12	Finished	3
3	3	(South Africa) Jody Scheckter	Hogan Racing	Lola T332-Chevrolet	12	Finished	5
4	10	(United Kingdom) David Hobbs	Hogan Racing	Lola T330-Chevrolet	12	Finished	7
5	94	(Canada) Eppie Wietzes	Formula Racing	Lola T400-Chevrolet	12	Finished	6
6	2	(New Zealand) Chris Amon	McCormack/Burke Racing	Talon MR-1A-Chevrolet	12	Finished	13
7	9	(Canada) John Cannon	Anglo American Racing	March 73A-Chevrolet	12	Finished	8
8	13	(United States) Ron Dykes	J. B. Quality Products	Lola T192-Chevrolet	11	+ 1 lap	20
9	45	(United States) George Follmer	Lance Smith Racing	Lance LSR1-Chevrolet	11	+ 1 lap	12
10	30	(United States) Skeeter McKitterick	AME Racing	Chevron B24-Chevrolet	11	+ 1 lap	19
11	12	(United States) Benny Scott	Black American Racers	Lola T332-Chevrolet	11	+ 1 lap	14
12	55	(United States) Bill Baker	Barbara Baker	Lola T332-Chevrolet	11	+ 1 lap	18
13	22	(United States) John Benton	Formula Magazine	Lola T332-Chevrolet	11	+ 1 lap	16
14	6	(New Zealand) Graham McRae	Eddie Lewis	Lola T332-Chevrolet		Retired	4
15	0	(United Kingdom) Jackie Oliver	Phoenix Racing	Shadow DN6-Dodge	8	Accident	2
16	63	(United States) Danny Ongais	Interscope Racing	Lola T332-Chevrolet		Retired	10
17	73	(Canada) Garth Pollard	G. W. Pollard	Lola T330-Chevrolet		Retired	22
18	82	(United States) Jim Gustafson	Jim Gustafson Racing	March 73A-Chevrolet		Retired	21
19	85	(United States) Arlon Koops	Solazure IV, Ltd.	Lola T330-Chevrolet	2	Accident	17
DNS	24	(United States) Evan Noyes	Evan Noyes	Lola T332-Chevrolet		Did not start	
DNS	25	(United States) Brett Lunger	Chris Oates, Ltd.	Lola T332-Chevrolet		Did not start	
DNS	18	(United States) Roger Bighouse	Roger Bighouse	Chevron B24-Chevrolet		Did not start	

== Race ==
At the start, Al Unser led from 2nd on the grid. On lap 3, polesitter Tony Brise had taken the lead and Mario Andretti took over second place. Brise led until lap 15, when both Andretti and Unser got by. Brise re-passed Unser on the next lap, and battled with Andretti until he re-took the lead on lap 29. On lap 33, Andretti retired with transmission problems, and one lap later Brise retired with a broken driveshaft. Brian Redman took the lead and pulled away to a nearly 30-second victory over Vern Schuppan and Eppie Wietzes. Redman also clinched the season points championship.

=== Result ===
Pos	No	Driver	Team	Car	Laps	Time/Retired	Grid
1	1	(United Kingdom) Brian Redman	Carl A. Haas Racing	Lola T332-Chevrolet	50	1:10:12.042	4
2	48	(Australia) Vern Schuppan	All American Racers	Eagle 755-Chevrolet	50	+29.938	7
3	94	(Canada) Eppie Wietzes	Formula Racing	Lola T400-Chevrolet	50	Running	10
4	2	(New Zealand) Chris Amon	McCormack/Burke Racing	Talon MR-1A-Chevrolet	49	+ 1 lap	12
5	10	(United Kingdom) David Hobbs	Hogan Racing	Lola T330-Chevrolet	49	+ 1 lap	8
6	4	(Australia) Warwick Brown	McCormack/Burke Racing	Talon MR-1A-Chevrolet	49	+ 1 lap	11
7	24	(United States) Evan Noyes	Evan Noyes	Lola T332-Chevrolet	48	+ 2 laps	27
8	19	(United States) Bob Earl	T. P. Racing	Lola T330-Chevrolet	48	+ 2 laps	17
9	46	(United States) John Morton	Krinitt Racing	Lola T332-Chevrolet	48	+ 2 laps	28
10	30	(United States) Skeeter McKitterick	AME Racing	Chevron B24-Chevrolet	46	+ 4 laps	20
11	12	(United States) Benny Scott	Black American Racers	Lola T332-Chevrolet	40	+ 10 laps	22
12	64	(United Kingdom) Tony Brise	Theodore Racing	Lola T332-Chevrolet	34	Driveshaft	1
13	5	(United States) Mario Andretti	Vel's Parnelli Jones Racing	Lola T332-Chevrolet	33	Transmission	3
14	50	(United States) John Korn	Jomar Racing	Lola T330-Chevrolet	33	Battery	21
15	3	(South Africa) Jody Scheckter	Hogan Racing	Lola T332-Chevrolet	29	Halfshaft	6
16	91	(United States) Jon Woodner	Interscope Racing	Talon MR-1A-Chevrolet	27	Accident	13
17	33	(United States) Elliott Forbes-Robinson	Francisco Mir Racing	Lola T332-Chevrolet	27	Camshaft	9
18	13	(United States) Ron Dykes	J. B. Quality Products	Lola T192-Chevrolet	27	Suspension	16
19	28	(United States) Randy Lewis	Wrangler Wracing Team	Lola T332-Chevrolet	20	Rod	15
20	51	(United States) Al Unser	Vel's Parnelli Jones Racing	Lola T332-Chevrolet	17	Suspension	2
21	00	(United Kingdom) Tom Pryce	Phoenix Racing	Shadow DN6-Dodge	14	Gearbox	5
22	75	(United States) Bob Nagel	Nagel Racing	Lola T332-Chevrolet	14	Mechanical	23
23	55	(United States) Bill Baker	Barbara Baker	Lola T332-Chevrolet	14	Black flagged	24
24	20	(United States) Gordon Johncock	Patrick Racing	Lola T332-Chevrolet	11	Rod	19
25	39	(United States) John Gunn	Racing Consultants	Lola T332-Chevrolet	9	Overheating	25
26	9	(Canada) John Cannon	Anglo American Racing	March 73A-Chevrolet	6	Halfshaft	14
27	6	(New Zealand) Graham McRae	Eddie Lewis	Lola T332-Chevrolet	1	Accident	26
28	45	(United States) George Follmer	Lance Smith Racing	Lance LSR1-Chevrolet	0	Wheel	18

Preceded by 1975 Atlanta Grand Prix	1975 SCCA/USAC F5000 Championship	Succeeded by 1975 Monterey Grand Prix
Preceded by None	Grand Prix of Long Beach	Succeeded by 1976 United States Grand Prix West
