= William Baker =

William Baker may refer to:

== Artists and designers ==
- William Baker (fashion designer) (born 1973), English fashion designer
- William Baker of Audlem (1705–1771), English architect
- William A. Baker (1911–1981), American naval architect
- William Bliss Baker (1859–1886), American landscape artist
- William T. Baker (born 1956), American residential designer and author

== Business leaders and owners ==
- William Baker (printer) (1742–1785), English printer
- William F. Baker (engineer) (born 1953), American partner at Skidmore, Owings & Merrill
- William F. Baker (television) (born 1942), retired American television executive
- William Meath Baker (1857–1935), English pottery owner and benefactor
- William O. Baker (1915–2005), former Bell Labs president

== Military personnel ==
- William Baker (Indian Army officer) (1888–1964), British officer who served in the Indian Army
- William Baker (colonist) (c. 1761–1836), British soldier and early Australian settler
- William Erskine Baker (1808–1881), British Indian Army officer
- William Clyde Baker Jr. (1904–1966), American major general who served in the Engineer Corps

== Politicians ==
=== American politicians ===
- William Baker (Kansas politician) (1831–1910), U.S. representative from Kansas
- William Baker (New York politician) (1795–1871), speaker of the New York Assembly in 1834
- William Benjamin Baker (1840–1911), U.S. representative from Maryland
- William C. Baker (1858–1931), mayor of Providence, Rhode Island
- William Baker (Pennsylvania and Indiana politician) (1813–1872), Pennsylvania state legislator and mayor of Evansville, Indiana
- William H. Baker (1827–1911), U.S. representative from New York
- William Leonard Baker (1831–1893), Australian politician, member of the WA Legislative Assembly
- Bill Baker (politician) (William Pond Baker, born 1940), U.S. representative from California
- William R. Baker (1820–1890), mayor of Houston, Texas
- William Washington Baker (1844–1927), member of the Virginia House of Delegates
- William Y. Baker (1829–?), Wisconsin state assemblyman
- Will Baker (born 1965), American perennial candidate

=== Commonwealth politicians ===
- Sir William Baker (British politician) (1705–1770), British businessman and politician; member of parliament for Plympton Erle
- William Baker (1743–1824), British member of parliament for Aldborough, Hertford, Hertfordshire and Plympton Erle
- William Baker (Lower Canada politician) (1789–1866), politician in Lower Canada
- William George Baker (1885–1960), politician in Saskatchewan, Canada

== Religious figures ==
- William Baker (bishop of Norwich) (1668–1732), bishop of Bangor and of Norwich in the Church of England
- William Baker (bishop of Zanzibar) (1902–1990), English Anglican bishop of Zanzibar
- William Baker (headmaster) (1841–1910), English headmaster and Church of England prebendary
- William Baker (priest) (1870–1950), Anglican archdeacon of Sheffield
- William Mumford Baker (1825–1883), American Presbyterian minister and author

== Sports ==
- William Baker (baseball) (1866–1930), owner of the Philadelphia Phillies, 1913–1930
- William Baker (Surrey cricketer) (1807–1885), English cricketer
- William de Chair Baker (1823–1888), English cricketer
- William Baker (Kent cricketer) (1832–1912), English cricketer
- William Baker (footballer) (1882–1916), British footballer for Plymouth Argyle
- Bill Baker (baseball) (William Presley Baker, 1911–2006), American baseball catcher
- Bill Baker (ice hockey, born 1882) (William Henry Baker, 1882–1916), Canadian hockey player
- Bill Baker (ice hockey, born 1956) (William Robert Baker), American hockey player
- Bill Baker (racing driver) (William Edwin Baker, 1931–1978), American NASCAR driver
- Billy Baker (footballer, born 1892) (William Edward Baker, 1892–1980), English footballer
- Billy Baker (footballer, born 1920) (William George Baker, 1920–2005), Welsh footballer

== Others ==
- William Baker (engineer) (1817–1878), English railway engineer
- William Spohn Baker (1824–1897), American writer, collector and title examiner
- William Baker, real name of the fictional character Sandman
- William Morrant Baker (1839–1896), English surgeon and describer of Baker's cyst
- William E. Baker (1873–1954), United States federal judge
- William Baker, lynched on March 8, 1922, see lynching of William Baker
- Willie Baker, American Piedmont blues guitarist, singer and songwriter

== See also ==
- Bill Baker (disambiguation)
