= B. J. Swanson =

American racing driver

- Born: November 21, 1948; Fort Wayne, Indiana, U.S.
- Died: August 13, 1975 (aged 26)
- Known for: American Racing Driving

Bernard James "B. J." Swanson (November 21, 1948 - August 13, 1975) was an American racing driver. Born in Fort Wayne, Indiana, he was the son of Mr & Mrs Bernard Swanson Jr. He lost his life while competing in a Formula 5000 race, in 1975.

== Racing career ==
At the age of 18, Swanson acquired a race prepared Triumph TR4, intending to race in a regional SCCA competition. However, when he submitted his physical form to the Competition Director, the South Bend Region SCCA, informed Swanson that the minimum age to compete was 21, not 18. Not to be deterred, shortly thereafter Swanson crossed the state line and joined a Michigan SCCA Region, registering as 21 years old.

After a few years in sports cars, Swanson moved up to Formula Ford and found his niche. In the early 70's, Swanson won races in the SCCA Central Division championship Formula Ford and also competed at the June Sprints. In 1974, Swanson entered his first, and only, SCCA National Championship Runoffs. He contested both the Formula Ford and Formula A class. In Formula Ford, Swanson qualified his Zink Z10 in thirteenth place. He failed to finish the race. In Formula A, Swanson contested a Lola T192 powered by a Chevrolet engine. The car was entered by Bay Racing Enterprises, a team set up in late 1973 by former drivers Bob Bay and Rick Vendl. The Lola was bought from Carl Haas. At the Runoffs, Swanson ran fifth when he was hit from behind by Larry McNeil forcing both cars to retire.

For 1975, team owner Bay set Swanson up with engineer Jerry Eisert, an IndyCar veteran crew chief. The team replaced the aging T192 chassis with a newer T332 chassis. After a test at Rattlesnake Raceway, the team entered the first race of the 1975 SCCA/USAC Formula 5000 Championship. At Pocono International Raceway, Swanson qualified eleventh and finished the race in seventh place, behind Bobby Unser. Swanson was a frequent top ten qualifier and scored impressive results. He scored his first, and only, podium finish at Watkins Glen International. Qualifying fourth, he finished third in the race, behind Al Unser and race winner Brian Redman. After this success Dan Gurney signed Swanson to contest the 1976 Indy 500 with All American Racers.

Swanson's racing career was cut short by a fatal accident at the Mid-Ohio Sports Car Course in 1975. During the weekend, Swanson was very strong, qualifying seventh and placing fourth in the heat race. At the start of the race, the throttle stuck open. Swanson made a heavy impact with the guardrail. As the lower guardrail broke, the upper guardrail hit Swanson's helmet. The race continued while Dan Gurney, head of the rescue crew, extricated Swanson from the car. In life-threatening condition, Swanson was rushed to Mansfield General Hospital in nearby Mansfield, Ohio. Swanson succumbed to his wounds two days later on 13 August 1975. A memorial service was held at Saint Joseph's Catholic Church in Fort Wayne, Indiana.

The car was later restored, converted and competed in the 1978 Can-Am season.

== Complete motorsports results ==
=== SCCA National Championship Runoffs ===
Year	Track	Car	Engine	Class	Finish	Start	Status
1974	Road Atlanta	Lola T192	Chevrolet	Formula A	5	4	Not running
1974	Road Atlanta	Zink Z10	Ford Kent	Formula Ford	19	13	Not running

=== American Open-Wheel racing results ===
(key) (Races in bold indicate pole position, races in italics indicate fastest race lap)

==== SCCA/USAC Formula 5000 Championship ====
Year	Team	Car	1	2	3	4	5	6	7	8	9	Rank	Points
1975	Bay Racing Enterprises	Lola T332	(United States); POC; 7	(Canada); MOS; 14	(United States); WGI; 3	(United States); ROA; 4	(United States); MOH; 22	(United States); ATL	(United States); LB	(United States); LS	(United States); RIV	9th	32
