= 1975 SCCA/USAC Formula 5000 Championship =

1975 SCCA/USAC Formula 5000 Championship season

Seasons
- ← 1974 1976 →

The 1975 SCCA/USAC Formula 5000 Championship was the ninth running of the SCCA Continental Championship professional open wheel automobile racing series, and the second to be sanctioned jointly by the Sports Car Club of America and the United States Automobile Club. The championship was open to cars complying with the SCCA's 5 liter (305 cid) American stock block engine specifications and to cars complying with the USAC's 161 cid turbocharged, 255 cid DOHC or 320 cid stock block engine regulations.

The 1975 SCCA/USAC Formula 5000 Championship was won by Brian Redman driving a Lola T332 Chevrolet.

In light of the Can Am Series' folding the previous year, the Formula 5000 Championship became the SCCA's flagship series in 1975. However, only two years later, the Formula 5000 category would form the basis for a revived Can Am Series. After 1975, Lola's dominance would end as March and Shadow cars would win events the following year. It would also be the end of Chevrolet's several year sweep of the championship as an engine manufacturer, as a Dodge powered car would garner a victory in 1976.

== Calendar ==
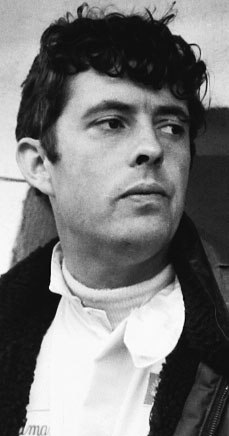
1975 champion Brian Redman (pictured in 1969)

The 1975 SCCA/USAC Formula 5000 Championship was contested over a nine race series.

| Race | Date | Race name | Location | Distance | Winning driver | Winning vehicle | Report |
|---|---|---|---|---|---|---|---|
| 1 | June 1 | Purolator 5000 | Pocono International Raceway | 35 laps | (United Kingdom) Brian Redman | Lola T332 – Chevrolet V8 | |
| 2 | June 15 | Labatt's Blue 5000 | Mosport Park | 40 laps | (United States) Mario Andretti | Lola T332 – Chevrolet V8 | |
| 3 | July 13 | | Watkins Glen International | 30 laps | (United Kingdom) Brian Redman | Lola T332 – Chevrolet V8 | |
| 4 | July 27 | | Road America | 25 laps | (United States) Mario Andretti | Lola T332 – Chevrolet V8 | |
| 5 | August 10 | Buckeye Cup | Mid-Ohio Sports Car Course | 42 laps | (United Kingdom) Brian Redman | Lola T332 – Chevrolet V8 | |
| 6 | August 31 | Atlanta Grand Prix | Road Atlanta | 40 laps | (United States) Al Unser | Lola T332 – Chevrolet V8 | |
| 7 | September 28 | Long Beach Grand Prix | Long Beach Street Circuit | 50 laps | (United Kingdom) Brian Redman | Lola T332 – Chevrolet V8 | Report |
| 8 | October 12 | Monterey Grand Prix | Laguna Seca Raceway | 50 laps | (United States) Mario Andretti | Lola T332 – Chevrolet V8 | |
| 9 | October 26 | California Grand Prix | Riverside International Raceway | 40 laps | (United States) Mario Andretti | Lola T332 – Chevrolet V8 | |

== Points system ==
Championship points were awarded on a 36-24-16-12-8-5-4-3-2-1 basis for the first ten positions in each race.

== Championship standings ==
| Position | Driver | Car | Points |
|---|---|---|---|
| 1 | (United Kingdom) Brian Redman | Lola T332 Chevrolet; Lola T400 Chevrolet | 227 |
| 2 | (United States) Mario Andretti | Lola T332 Chevrolet | 165 |
| 3 | (United States) Al Unser | Lola T332 Chevrolet | 161 |
| 4 | (United Kingdom) Jackie Oliver | Shadow DN6 Chevrolet; Shadow DN6 Dodge | 77 |
| 5 | (Canada) Eppie Wietzes | Lola T400 Chevrolet | 60 |
| 6 | (United Kingdom) David Hobbs | Lola T332 Chevrolet | 50 |
| 7 | (Australia) Warwick Brown | Talon MR1A Chevrolet | 42 |
| 8 | (Australia) Vern Schuppan | Eagle Chevrolet | 39 |
| 9 | (United States) B.J. Swanson | Lola T332 Chevrolet | 32 |
| 10 | (United Kingdom) Tony Brise | Lola T332 Chevrolet | 17 |
| 11 | (United States) John Morton | Lola T332 Chevrolet; Lola T400 Chevrolet | 15 |
| 12 | (Canada) John Cannon | March 731/751 Chevrolet | 13 |
| 13 | (United States) Elliott Forbes-Robinson | Lola T332 Chevrolet | 12 |
| = | (New Zealand) Chris Amon | Talon MR1 Chevrolet | 12 |
| = | (United States) John Woodner | Lola T400 Chevrolet; Talon MR1 Chevrolet | 12 |
| 16 | (United States) Evan Noyes | Lola T332 Chevrolet | 10 |
| 17 | (United States) Jerry Karl | Lola T332 Chevrolet | 7 |
| = | (United States) John Gunn | Lola T332 Chevrolet | 7 |
| = | (United Kingdom) Tony Dean | Chevron B28 Chevrolet | 7 |
| = | (New Zealand) Graham McRae | Lola T332 Chevrolet | 7 |
| 21 | (United States) Danny Ongais | Lola T400 Chevrolet; Lola T332 Chevrolet | 5 |
| = | (United States) Bobby Unser | Eagle Chevrolet | 5 |
| = | (United States) Gordon Johncock | Lola T332 Chevrolet | 5 |
| 24 | (United States) Tuck Thomas | Lola T332 Chevrolet | 4 |
| 25 | (United States) Bob Earle | Lola T330 Chevrolet | 3 |
| 26 | (United States) James Dunkel | Chevron B24 Chevrolet | 2 |
| = | (United States) Roger Bighouse | Chevron B24 Chevrolet | 2 |
| 28 | (United States) Dan Furey | Lola T330 AMC | 1 |
| = | (United States) Skeeter McKitterick | Chevron B24/B28 Chevrolet | 1 |
| = | (United States) Randy Lewis | Lola T332 Chevrolet | 1 |
