= Parnelli VPJ4 =

Parnelli VPJ4 Parnelli VPJ4B
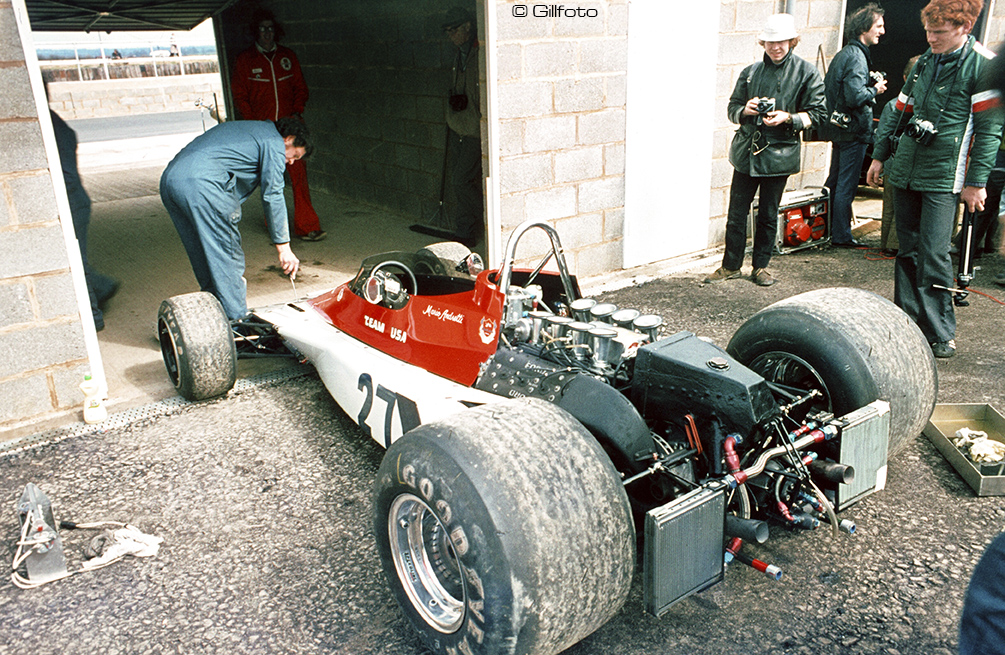
- Category: Formula One
- Constructor: Parnelli
- Designer: Maurice Philippe

Technical specifications
- Chassis: Aluminium monocoque.
- Suspension (front): Double wishbone, with inboard coilover shock absorbers.
- Suspension (rear): Double wishbone.
- Axle track: Front: 1,499 mm (59.0 in); Rear: 1,549 mm (61.0 in)
- Wheelbase: 2,540 mm (100 in)
- Engine: Ford-Cosworth DFV 2,993 cc (182.6 cu in) 90° V8, naturally aspirated, mid-mounted.
- Transmission: Hewland FG 400 5-speed manual gearbox.
- Weight: 578 kg (1,274 lb)
- Fuel: 1974-1975: Valvoline; 1976: Castrol
- Tyres: 1974-1975: Firestone; 1975-1976: Goodyear

Competition history
- Notable entrants: Vel's Parnelli Jones Racing
- Notable drivers: (United States) Mario Andretti
- Debut: 1974 Canadian Grand Prix
| Races | Wins | Poles | F/Laps |
|---|---|---|---|
| 16 | 0 | 0 | 1 |
- Constructors' Championships: 0
- Drivers' Championships: 0
- Unless otherwise stated, all data refer to Formula One World Championship Grands Prix only.

The Parnelli VPJ4 was a Formula One racing car designed by Maurice Philippe, and used by Vel's Parnelli Jones Racing during the 1974, 1975 and 1976 Formula One seasons.

== Development ==
Vel's Parnelli Jones Racing was formed in 1969 by former USAC racer Parnelli Jones and his business partner Velko "Vel" Miletich. Parnelli was initially solely concerned with USAC racing, Parnelli secured the services of ex Team Lotus designer Maurice Philippe and driver Mario Andretti for USAC racing in the early 1970s and in 1974 decided to move into Formula One racing, with financial support from tire manufacturer Firestone. However, Firestone's decision to quit racing at the end of 1974 meant that a major partner was lost. The Parnelli VPJ4 car owed much to Philippe's Lotus 72 design.

== Racing history ==
=== 1974 ===
The VPJ4 made its debut at the 1974 Canadian Grand Prix with Andretti and finished seventh. At the United States, the American's car developed an ignition fault on the parade lap, and the start was delayed 25 minutes while the crew attempted to solve the problem. Finally, Andretti took his place on the grid, but when starter Tex Hopkins dropped the green flag, the Parnelli car did not move and the field had to scramble to avoid the American. The Parnelli mechanics eventually got the car push started two laps late, but Andretti was black-flagged for receiving outside assistance.

The Parnelli team scored no World Championship points during the year.

=== 1975 ===
The first race of 1975 was the 1975 Argentine Grand Prix when Andretti retired with transmission failure. Before Brazil Parnelli changed their tyre supplier to Goodyear after Firestone's decision to quit racing but the American finished seventh. Andretti finished 17th at the South African Grand Prix but stopped the car with eight laps to go with transmission failure. At Spain Vittorio Brambilla (March) tangled with the American; Andretti's car hit the back of Niki Lauda (Ferrari), sending him into Lauda's teammate Clay Regazzoni. Lauda was out immediately, while Regazzoni took his car to the garage and was sent back out. After the first corner confusion resolved, James Hunt (Hesketh) was shown as the leader. Andretti had managed to keep going, and was running in second. He took the lead when Hunt crashed but the American retired with broken suspension. The Monaco Grand Prix saw Andretti retire when he entered the pits with his car on fire, caused by an oil Leak. The team skipped Belgium because Andretti and the Parnelli team were racing at the Indianapolis 500. The American finished fourth at Sweden. The team skipped the Dutch Grand Prix because Andretti and the Parnelli team were racing in the United States again. The American finished fifth at France. Andretti finished 12th at the British Grand Prix. The American finished tenth at Germany. Andretti retired from the final three races, spinning off at Austria, Crashing at Italy and with broken suspension at the United States.

The Parnelli team scored five World Championship points, earning them tenth place in the Constructors' Championship.

=== 1976 ===
The Parnelli team skipped the Brazilian Grand Prix but entered the 1976 South African Grand Prix with the VPJ4B and Andretti finished sixth. Before the United States Grand Prix West Andretti only learned of the Parnelli team leaving Formula One from journalist Chris Economaki, as he sat in the car on the grid but the American retired from the race with a water leak. This led to some bad feeling between Andretti and Jones, Andretti returned to Lotus for the remainder of the 1976 season.

The Parnelli team had scored one World Championship point, earning them thirteenth place in the Constructors' Championship.

== Complete Formula One World Championship results ==
(key)(results in bold indicate pole position, results in italics indicate fastest lap)

| Year | Entrant | Chassis | Engine | Tyres | Drivers | 1 | 2 | 3 | 4 | 5 | 6 | 7 | 8 | 9 | 10 | 11 | 12 | 13 | 14 | 15 | 16 | Points | WCC |
|---|---|---|---|---|---|---|---|---|---|---|---|---|---|---|---|---|---|---|---|---|---|---|---|
| 1974 | Vel's Parnelli Jones Racing | VPJ4 | Ford Cosworth DFV 3.0 V8 | **F** | | ARG | BRA | RSA | ESP | BEL | MON | SWE | NED | FRA | GBR | GER | AUT | ITA | CAN | USA | | 0 | - |
| 1974 | Vel's Parnelli Jones Racing | VPJ4 | Ford Cosworth DFV 3.0 V8 | **F** | Mario Andretti | | | | | | | | | | | | | | 7 | DSQ | | 0 | - |
| 1975 | Vel's Parnelli Jones Racing | VPJ4 | Ford Cosworth DFV 3.0 V8 | **F** **G** | | ARG | BRA | RSA | ESP | MON | BEL | SWE | NED | FRA | GBR | GER | AUT | ITA | USA | | | 5 | **10th** |
| 1975 | Vel's Parnelli Jones Racing | VPJ4 | Ford Cosworth DFV 3.0 V8 | **F** **G** | Mario Andretti | Ret | 7 | 17 | Ret | Ret | | 4 | | 5 | 12 | 10 | Ret | Ret | Ret | | | 5 | **10th** |
| 1976 | Vel's Parnelli Jones Racing | VPJ4B | Ford Cosworth DFV 3.0 V8 | **G** | | BRA | RSA | USW | ESP | BEL | MON | SWE | FRA | GBR | GER | AUT | NED | ITA | CAN | USA | JPN | 1 | **13th** |
| 1976 | Vel's Parnelli Jones Racing | VPJ4B | Ford Cosworth DFV 3.0 V8 | **G** | Mario Andretti | | 6 | Ret | | | | | | | | | | | | | | 1 | **13th** |

== Non-Championship results ==
(key) (Races in bold indicate pole position) (Races in italics indicate fastest lap)

| Year | Entrant | Engine | Driver | Tyres | 1 | 2 | 3 |
|---|---|---|---|---|---|---|---|
| 1975 | Vel's Parnelli Jones Racing | Ford Cosworth DFV 3.0 V8 | | **G** | ROC | INT | SUI |
| 1975 | Vel's Parnelli Jones Racing | Ford Cosworth DFV 3.0 V8 | Mario Andretti | **G** | | 3 | |
