= 1976 South African Grand Prix =

Race 2 of 16 in the 1976 Formula One season
← Previous race	Next race →
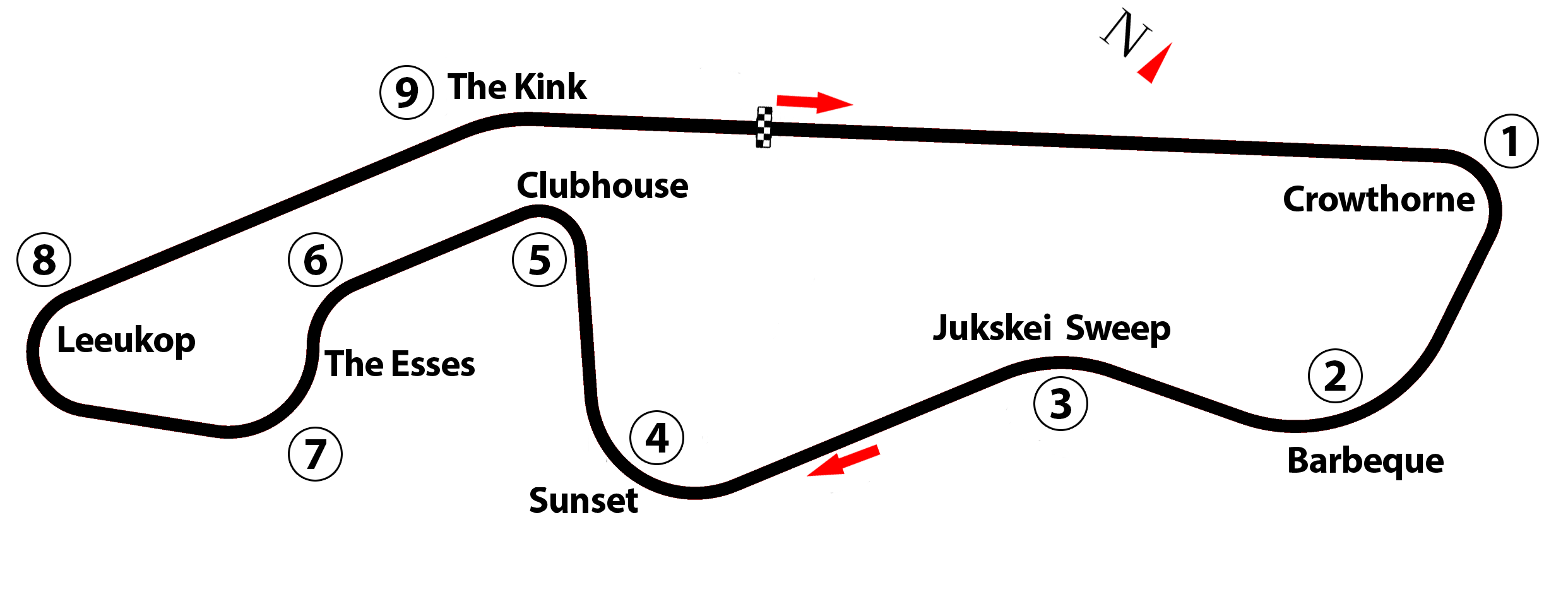

Race details
- Date: 6 March 1976
- Official name: XXII The Citizen Grand Prix of South Africa
- Location: Kyalami, Transvaal Province, South Africa
- Course: Permanent racing facility
- Course length: 4.104 km (2.550 miles)
- Distance: 78 laps, 320.112 km (198.908 miles)
- Weather: Sunny

Pole position
Driver	(United Kingdom) James Hunt	McLaren-Ford
- Time: 1:16.10

Fastest lap
Driver	(Austria) Niki Lauda	Ferrari
- Time: 1:17.97 on lap 6

Podium
First	(Austria) Niki Lauda	Ferrari
Second	(United Kingdom) James Hunt	McLaren-Ford
Third	(Germany) Jochen Mass	McLaren-Ford

The 1976 South African Grand Prix (formally the XXII The Citizen Grand Prix of South Africa) was a Formula One motor race held on 6 March 1976 at Kyalami in Transvaal Province, South Africa. It was the second round of the 1976 Formula One season. The race was the 22nd South African Grand Prix and the tenth to be held at Kyalami. The race was held over 78 laps of the 4.104-kilometre circuit for a total race distance of 320 kilometres.

The race was won by Austrian driver Niki Lauda in a Ferrari 312T. The win was Lauda's third win in succession. He finished 1.3 seconds ahead of British driver and Lauda's season long rival James Hunt in a McLaren M23. Hunt's McLaren teammate, West German driver Jochen Mass, finished third.

Hunt took pole position for the second time in two races, with Lauda alongside. Lauda led into the first corner, with Hunt dropping down to fourth behind Mass and Italian driver Vittorio Brambilla in his March 761. Hunt was waved through by Mass, and passed Brambilla to take second after five laps. Lauda led from start to finish to win. Behind Hunt and Mass, South African driver Jody Scheckter was fourth in his Tyrrell 007. A lap down in fifth was British driver John Watson in a Penske PC3 with Mario Andretti sixth in a Parnelli VPJ4B.

Two wins from two races saw Lauda twelve points clear in the championship over Hunt and Tyrrell's Patrick Depailler. In the constructors' championship, Ferrari were nine points clear of Tyrrell and eleven points ahead of McLaren.

== Classification ==
=== Qualifying ===
Pos.	No.	Driver	Constructor	Time/Gap
1	11	(United Kingdom) James Hunt	McLaren–Ford	1:16.10
2	1	(Austria) Niki Lauda	Ferrari	+0.10
3	28	(United Kingdom) John Watson	Penske–Ford	+0.33
4	12	(West Germany) Jochen Mass	McLaren–Ford	+0.35
5	9	(Italy) Vittorio Brambilla	March–Ford	+0.54
6	4	(France) Patrick Depailler	Tyrrell–Ford	+0.67
7	16	(United Kingdom) Tom Pryce	Shadow–Ford	+0.74
8	26	(France) Jacques Laffite	Ligier–Matra	+0.78
9	2	(Switzerland) Clay Regazzoni	Ferrari	+0.84
10	10	(Sweden) Ronnie Peterson	March–Ford	+0.93
11	7	(Argentina) Carlos Reutemann	Brabham–Alfa Romeo	+0.99
12	3	(South Africa) Jody Scheckter	Tyrrell–Ford	+1.08
13	27	(United States) Mario Andretti	Parnelli–Ford	+1.15
14	8	(Brazil) Carlos Pace	Brabham–Alfa Romeo	+1.16
15	17	(France) Jean-Pierre Jarier	Shadow–Ford	+1.25
16	15	(South Africa) Ian Scheckter	Tyrrell–Ford	+1.30
17	34	(West Germany) Hans-Joachim Stuck	March–Ford	+1.34
18	22	(New Zealand) Chris Amon	Ensign–Ford	+1.63
19	20	(Belgium) Jacky Ickx	Wolf-Williams–Ford	+2.03
20	18	(United States) Brett Lunger	Surtees–Ford	+2.26
21	30	(Brazil) Emerson Fittipaldi	Fittipaldi–Ford	+2.30
22	21	(France) Michel Leclère	Wolf-Williams–Ford	+2.72
23	5	(United Kingdom) Bob Evans	Lotus–Ford	+3.25
24	24	(Austria) Harald Ertl	Hesketh–Ford	+6.01
25	6	(Sweden) Gunnar Nilsson	Lotus–Ford	+6.60

=== Race ===
Pos	No	Driver	Constructor	Laps	Time/Retired	Grid	Points
1	1	(Austria) Niki Lauda	Ferrari	78	1:42:18.4	2	9
2	11	(United Kingdom) James Hunt	McLaren-Ford	78	+ 1.3	1	6
3	12	(West Germany) Jochen Mass	McLaren-Ford	78	+ 45.9	4	4
4	3	(South Africa) Jody Scheckter	Tyrrell-Ford	78	+ 1:08.4	12	3
5	28	(United Kingdom) John Watson	Penske-Ford	77	+ 1 Lap	3	2
6	27	(United States) Mario Andretti	Parnelli-Ford	77	+ 1 Lap	13	1
7	16	(United Kingdom) Tom Pryce	Shadow-Ford	77	+ 1 Lap	7	
8	9	(Italy) Vittorio Brambilla	March-Ford	77	+ 1 Lap	5	
9	4	(France) Patrick Depailler	Tyrrell-Ford	77	+ 1 Lap	6	
10	5	(United Kingdom) Bob Evans	Lotus-Ford	77	+ 1 Lap	23	
11	18	(United States) Brett Lunger	Surtees-Ford	77	+ 1 Lap	20	
12	34	(West Germany) Hans-Joachim Stuck	March-Ford	76	+ 2 Laps	17	
13	21	(France) Michel Leclère	Wolf-Williams-Ford	76	+ 2 Laps	22	
14	22	(New Zealand) Chris Amon	Ensign-Ford	76	+ 2 Laps	18	
15	24	(Austria) Harald Ertl	Hesketh-Ford	74	+ 4 Laps	24	
16	20	(Belgium) Jacky Ickx	Wolf-Williams-Ford	73	+ 5 Laps	19	
17	30	(Brazil) Emerson Fittipaldi	Fittipaldi-Ford	70	Engine	21	
Ret	2	(Switzerland) Clay Regazzoni	Ferrari	52	Engine	9	
Ret	26	(France) Jacques Laffite	Ligier-Matra	49	Engine	8	
Ret	17	(France) Jean-Pierre Jarier	Shadow-Ford	28	Radiator	15	
Ret	8	(Brazil) Carlos Pace	Brabham-Alfa Romeo	22	Oil Pressure	14	
Ret	6	(Sweden) Gunnar Nilsson	Lotus-Ford	18	Clutch	25	
Ret	7	(Argentina) Carlos Reutemann	Brabham-Alfa Romeo	16	Oil Pressure	11	
Ret	10	(Sweden) Ronnie Peterson	March-Ford	15	Accident	10	
Ret	15	(South Africa) Ian Scheckter	Tyrrell-Ford	0	Accident	16	

== Notes ==
- This was the Formula One World Championship debut for Swedish driver and future Grand Prix winner Gunnar Nilsson.
- This was the 100th pole position by a British driver.

== Championship standings after the race ==
Drivers' Championship standings

	Pos	Driver	Points
	1	(Austria) Niki Lauda	18
	2	(France) Patrick Depailler	6
13	3	(United Kingdom) James Hunt	6
2	4	(West Germany) Jochen Mass	5
	5	(South Africa) Jody Scheckter	5

Constructors' Championship standings

	Pos	Constructor	Points
	1	(Italy) Ferrari	18
	2	(United Kingdom) Tyrrell-Ford	9
2	3	(United Kingdom) McLaren-Ford	7
1	4	(United Kingdom) Shadow-Ford	4
1	5	(United Kingdom) March-Ford	3

- Note: Only the top five positions are included for both sets of standings.

Previous race: 1976 Brazilian Grand Prix	FIA Formula One World Championship; 1976 season	Next race: 1976 United States Grand Prix West
Previous race: 1975 South African Grand Prix	South African Grand Prix	Next race: 1977 South African Grand Prix
