= Pocono Raceway =

Motorsport track in the United States

The Tricky Triangle

- Tri-Oval (1971–present)
- Location: 1234 Long Pond Road; Blakeslee, Pennsylvania; 18610
- Coordinates: 41°03′40″N 75°30′30″W
- Capacity: Not publicly known; 2021 estimate at 76,812
- Owner: Mattco, Inc.
- Broke ground: July 8, 1965; 61 years ago
- Opened: May 4, 1969; 57 years ago (initial oval); July 19, 1971; 55 years ago (tri-oval)
- Construction cost: US$6 million
- Former names: Pocono International Raceway
- Major events: Current: NASCAR Cup Series; The Great American Getaway 400 (1971–present); Pocono Organics CBD 325 (1982–2021); NASCAR O'Reilly Auto Parts Series; MillerTech Battery 250 (2016–present); ARCA Menards Series; Sunset Hill Shooting Range 150 (1969, 1983, 1987–2023, 2026); Pennsylvania ARCA 125 (2010–2019); Future: NASCAR Truck Series; MillerTech Battery 200 (2010–2025, 2027); Former: IndyCar Series; ABC Supply 500 (1971–1989, 2013–2019); IMSA GT Championship; Grand Prix at Pocono (1981–1985); AMA Superbike Championship (1977–1978, 1980–1986); Trans-Am Series (1975–1976)
- Website: poconoraceway.com

Tri-Oval (1971–present)
- Surface: Asphalt
- Length: 2.500 mi (4.023 km)
- Turns: 3
- Banking: Turn 1: 14° Turn 2: 8° Turn 3: 6°
- Race lap record: 0:40.9009 ( (Australia) Ryan Briscoe, Dallara DW12, 2014, IndyCar)

Road Course (1985–present)
- Surface: Asphalt
- Length: 2.500 mi (4.023 km)
- Turns: 7
- Banking: Turn 1: 14° Turn 2: 8°
- Race lap record: 1:15.440 ( (United States) Al Holbert, Porsche 962, 1985, IMSA GTP)

Road Course (1973–1984)
- Surface: Asphalt
- Length: 2.800 mi (4.506 km)
- Turns: 8
- Banking: Turn 1: 14° Turn 2: 8°
- Race lap record: 1:20.200 ( (United States) Danny Ongais/ (Australia) Vern Schuppan, Lola T332C/Eagle 755, 1976, F5000)

Short Road Course (1969–1984)
- Surface: Asphalt
- Length: 1.800 mi (2.897 km)
- Turns: 7
- Banking: Turn 3: 6°
- Race lap record: 0:54.344 ( (Canada) Eppie Wietzes, Lola T330, 1973, F5000)

Original Short Oval (1969–1990s)
- Surface: Asphalt
- Length: 0.750 mi (1.207 km)
- Turns: 4

Pocono Raceway (formerly known as the Pocono International Raceway in early years) is a 2.500 mi (4.023 km) tri-oval track in Blakeslee, Pennsylvania. The track has held a variety of events since its opening in 1969, including NASCAR, IndyCar Series, and IMSA GT Championship races. The facility is owned by Mattco, Inc. and led by track chief executive officer Nick Igdalsky.

After over a decade of planning and construction delays, Pocono Raceway opened in 1969 under the control of David Montgomery. Montgomery quickly left any involvement with the speedway after him and investor Joseph Mattioli disagreed with the facility's future plans, with Mattioli taking over control of the venue. Under Mattioli's tenure, the main tri-oval opened two years after the venue's initial opening. Pocono Raceway initially faced heavy financial turmoil throughout much of the 1970s, but was able to recover starting in the mid-1980s with the success of its NASCAR races. Pocono Raceway received major expansion and upgrades in the 1990s and 2000s with the addition of seating and renovation of various amenities at the track.

== Description ==
=== Configurations ===
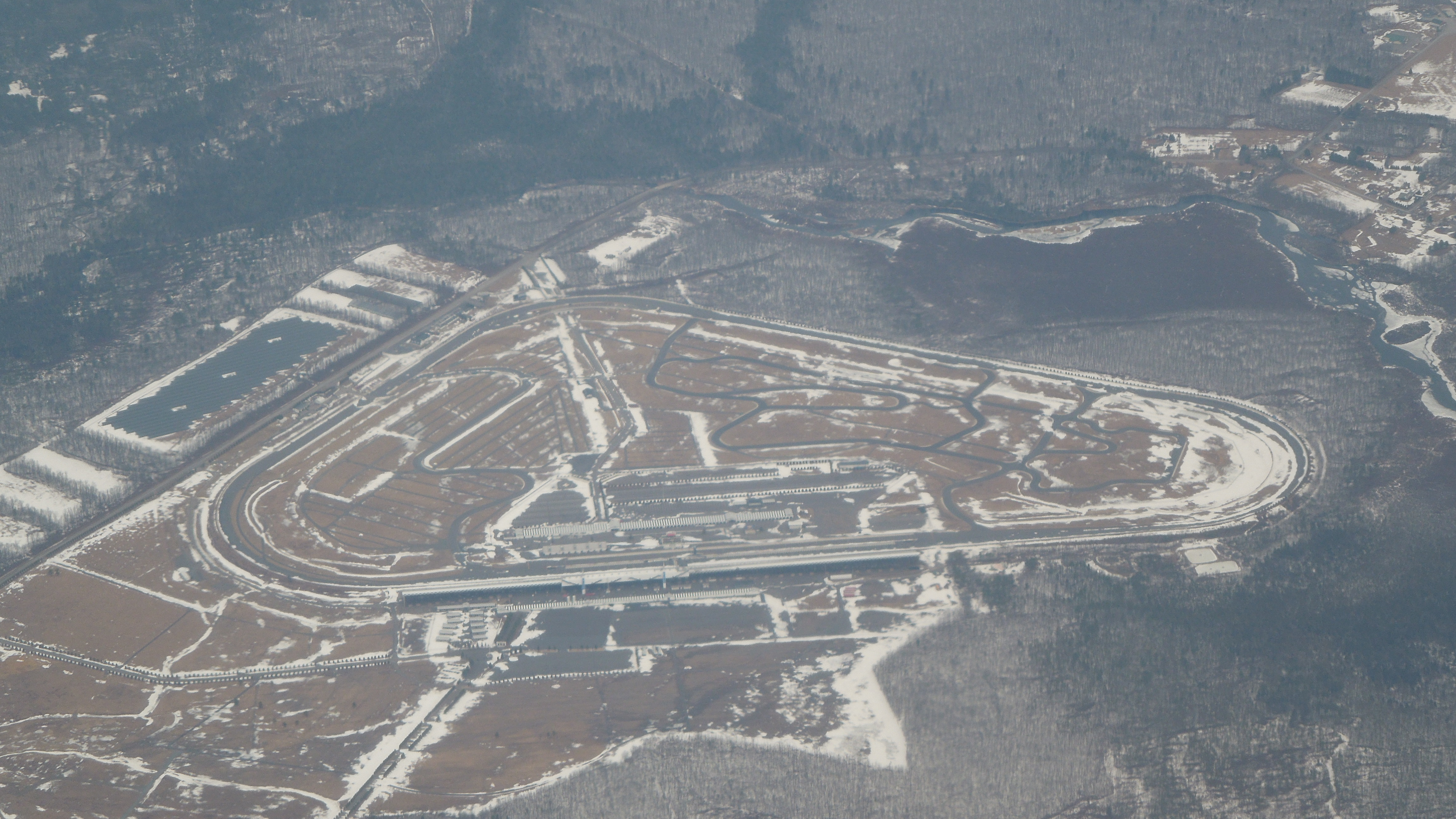
An aerial photo of Pocono Raceway in 2014

Pocono Raceway's main track in its current form is measured at 2.500 mi (4.023 km), with 14° of banking on the track's first turn, 8° of banking on its second turn, and 6° of banking on its third turn. Compared to other NASCAR tracks, the track is the only one on the schedule that has three turns. All turns are based on turns from other racetracks; track designer and two-time Indianapolis 500 winner Rodger Ward designed the first turn after Trenton Speedway, the second turn after Indianapolis Motor Speedway, and the third turn after the Milwaukee Mile. In addition to the tri-oval, the venue features various infield road course layouts according to current Pocono Raceway CEO Nick Igdalsky.

=== Amenities ===
Pocono Raceway is located in Blakeslee, Pennsylvania, and is served by Interstate 80 and Pennsylvania Route 115. Although the venue does not release official seating capacity figures due to its private ownership, Frontstretch estimated a seating capacity of 76,812 in 2021.

== Track history ==
=== Planning and construction ===
In 1957, Racing, Inc. was formed by disgruntled fans in Pennsylvania who criticized the poor quality of racing amenities in the state. After searching more than 30 tracts of land, on April 6, 1962, the Pocono Record reported that Racing, Inc., led by David Montgomery, began purchasing tracts of land near Blakeslee, Pennsylvania, totaling over 1,025 acres (415 ha) at a price "in excess of $114,000" (adjusted for inflation, $1,213,366) in hopes of building a multi-million dollar racing facility then known as the "Pocono Mountains International Raceway". The following month, the company began issuing common stock; further plans were also released by Montgomery within the month, with proposals of 110,000 grandstand seats being made. The following month, the track layout was revealed to be a 2.500 mi (4.023 km) oval. In January 1963, the first events on an improvised circuit of the track was held; the event was deemed a success by organizers, with plans to host future improvised races "every two to three weeks".

==== Persistent delays ====
Developers began clearing land on November 9, 1964. By this point, Montgomery stated to the Record that the track layout had changed to a new "top secret" design. In April 1965, the Record reported that plans expanded for the multi-layout complex to include a 3/4-mile (1.2 km) oval, which was slated to host the complex's first race. Two months later, the secret design was revealed to be a tri-oval shaped layout; additional plans for a 2.800 mi (4.506 km) road course layout using parts of the oval, a 3,740 ft (1,140 m) dragstrip, and a 1.800 mi (2.897 km) road course layout using portions of both ovals were made. Groundbreaking on the now-named Pocono International Raceway (PIR) took place on July 8, 1965, with plans to open the facility on September 5. However, the opening was delayed until the spring of 1966 due to constant rain.

In May 1966, a 300 mi (480 km) United States Auto Club (USAC) Indy-car race was announced to inaugurate the facility on August 28 of that year; however, after further rain and a self-described "tight money situation" according to Montgomery, the race and the track's opening was postponed, with the latter being delayed until the spring of 1967. A $176,219 (adjusted for inflation, $1,748,635) lien was filed by construction contractor Schartz and Baker in December 1966 due to alleged unpaid dues, placing doubts on the project's financial stability; Montgomery refuted the claim in January, and four months later, Racing, Inc. filed a lawsuit against Schartz and Baker for filing the lien "without basis". The lien was dismissed on August 23, 1967, and the lawsuit was settled on May 25, 1968, with both ending in victories for Racing, Inc. The legal battles with Schartz and Baker halted all construction for nearly two years; construction did not resume until early July. Two months later, track officials announced a 200-lap "preview race" on the 0.750 mi (1.207 km) oval for October 20 featuring supermodifieds; however, after three postponements due to weather, the opening was delayed until the spring of 1969.

=== Early years ===
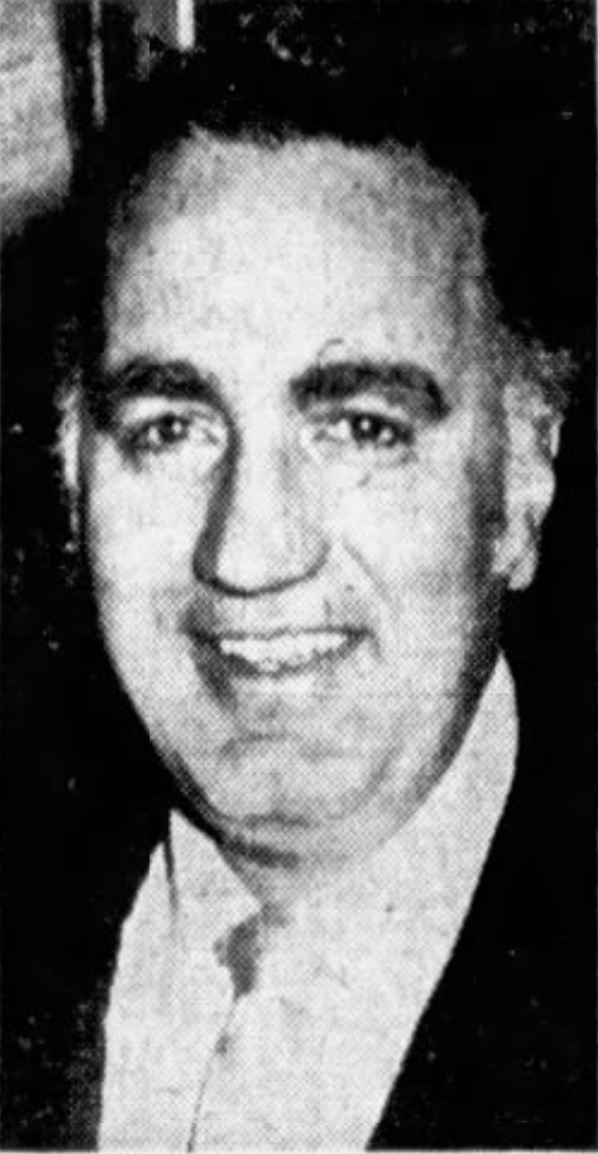
Initial investor Joseph Mattioli (pictured in 1970) replaced David Montgomery as CEO of the track in 1971. Mattioli remained in the position until 2011.

PIR officially opened on May 4, 1969, for a supermodified program won by Jim Shampine on the venue's 0.750 mi (1.207 km) oval. During the program, the venue experienced its first fatality after Troy Ruttman Jr. crashed during the feature event, suffering a fractured skull. The venue's short road course layout, now measured at 1.800 mi (2.897 km), opened approximately four months later. In February 1970, USAC agreed to host their second attempt at an event at the speedway, this time with a 500 mi (800 km) race on the venue's 2.500 mi (4.023 km) tri-oval. Along with the USAC race, the deal also promised a 500-mile race with "late model stock[s]". According to PIR board member and eventual future long-time track CEO Joseph Mattioli, PIR did not make a profit in both 1969 and 1970, with Mattioli and Montgomery disagreeing over how to expand the facility.

Six months after USAC's announcement, Montgomery resigned from his position as CEO, with Mattioli, a former Philadelphia dentist who helped paid off much the facility's finances in its construction phase, being named as his replacement by the start of 1971. In late October, paving of the tri-oval was completed, with testing runs conducted on November 2 by Jim McElreath, Jim Hurtubise, and Al Loquasto. To accommodate the newly built track, seating capacity was increased from 10,000 to "more than 69,000" according to The Philadelphia Inquirer's Bill Simmons. According to a June 1971 interview given by Mattioli, the entire facility cost $6 million (adjusted for inflation, $47,699,260).

An official ribbon-cutting ceremony for the tri-oval was held on June 19, 1971. It held its first race on July 3, with Mark Donohue winning the 500-mile USAC-sanctioned event. PIR held its first major stock car race later that year on September 25, with Butch Hartman winning a 500-mile USAC-sanctioned event. In 1973, parts of the 1.8 mi (2.9 km) road course layout were repaved by April, including the second and third turns of the main speedway. Two months later, the venue's 2.800 mi (4.506 km) road course held its first race. After USAC's stock car racing contract expired in 1973, the facility was in heavy financial turmoil, with Mattioli considering selling off the track. He was convinced otherwise by NASCAR founder Bill France Sr., who was able to convince Mattioli by giving him a business card with an inspirational quote from American politician Adlai Stevenson II. The venue later hosted its first NASCAR Cup Series event the following year on August 4, with Richard Petty winning the event. In 1978, the tri-oval's second turn was repaved twice in the same year after complaints were raised by drivers about the bumpiness of the track surface.

=== Financial troubles in midst of CART–USAC split ===
In 1979, the track suffered numerous financial blows. After numerous car owners in USAC split to create their own racing league named Championship Auto Racing Teams (CART) the year prior, the USAC-sanctioned 1979 Pocono 500 faced numerous issues, including Schaefer Beer ending their title sponsorship of the race after eight years, numerous CART-affiliated drivers boycotting the event, and the 1970s energy crisis all caused economic downturn for the event. In addition, the inaugural major drag races at the venue scheduled for May 18–20 were cancelled; a dispute began between the raceway and the International Hot Rod Association (IHRA), the event's sanctioning body, for refunds. In August, PIR sued CART in an antitrust suit for $6.3 million (adjusted for inflation, $27,947,043).

The following year, in response to venue's financial hit in 1979, the venue was leased out by the Indianapolis Motor Speedway for a year to help the track's financial situation. In February 1981, The Morning Call reported that Mattioli was considering selling the track, admitting that he was negotiating with three separate groups interested in purchasing. After a chaotic 1981 Pocono 500 that saw another CART boycott, another lawsuit was filed by the venue against the organization; this time for $9 million. In 1982, despite the track being still up for sale, Mattioli admitted in April that they were "looking for recapitalization possibilities" in efforts to retain racing, adding a second annual Cup Series weekend. The following month, CART settled with PIR out of court, agreeing on a five-year contract. The following year, now out of their financial troubles with the success of their events, Mattioli stated to The Citizens' Voice that "we certainly aren't thinking of selling the facility at this time". He later stated in a 1995 Scranton Times interview that the addition of a second Cup Series event saved the facility, stating, "I've been quoted on more than one occasion that Bill France Sr. and Bill France Jr. saved our ass."

=== Financial recovery, 1990s venue expansion ===
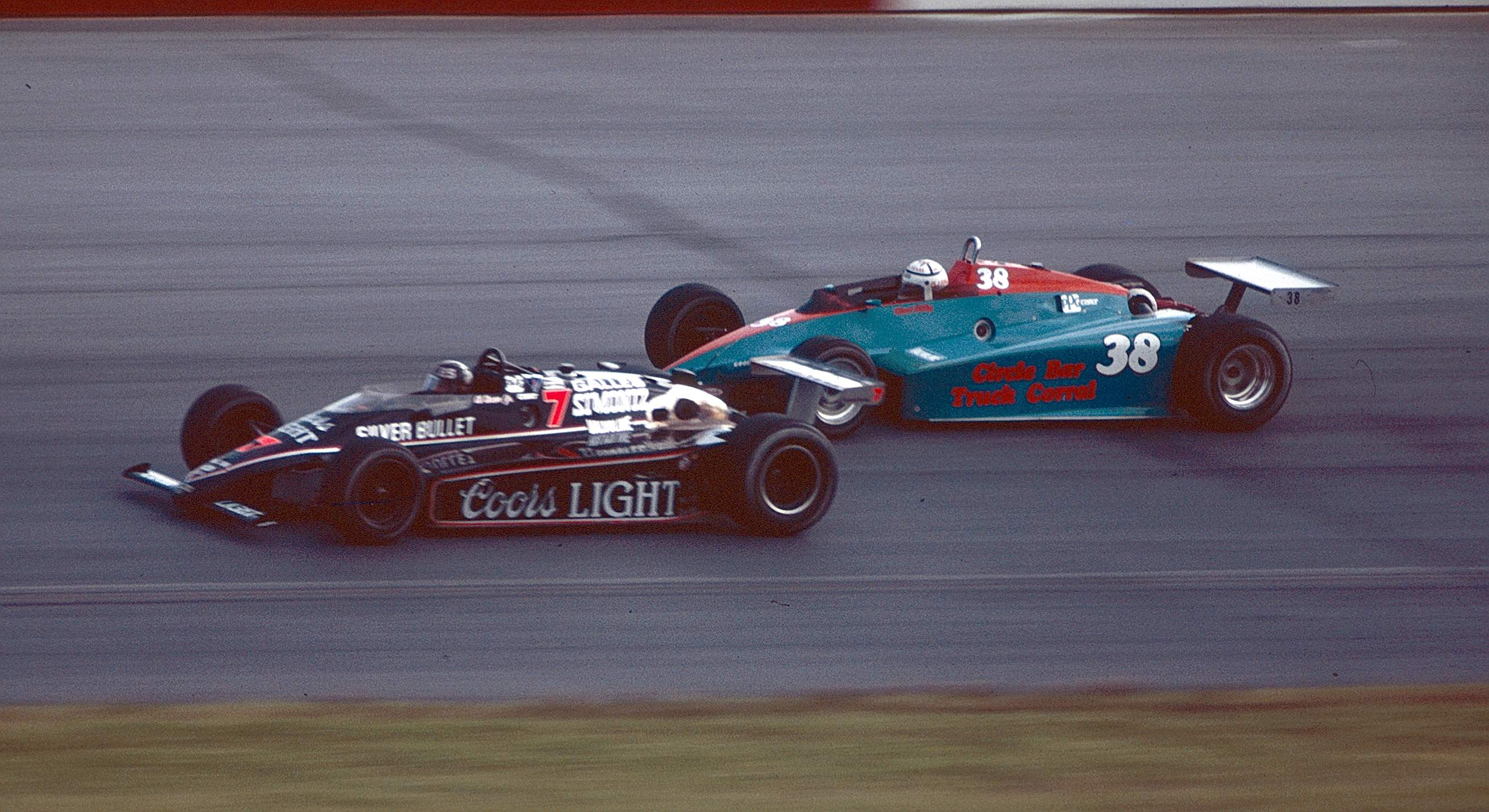
A CART race at Pocono Raceway in 1984. CART raced annually at the facility until 1989, when it was dropped due to safety concerns with the track.

In 1984, the tri-oval's frontstretch and pit road was repaved alongside the construction of a new victory lane. Two years later, 14 pit road suites and the repaving of the tri-oval's first and second turns was completed. By 1987, the venue's financial state was recovering; Citizens' Voice reporter John Zimich wrote that with increased attendance and sponsor deals, "Pocono has survived a great deal of adversity and the future certainly looks bright". However, in the following couple years, the track received considerable criticism from open-wheel drivers for an unsafe and bumpy track surface. As a result of the complaints, the future of open-wheel racing at the venue was put into jeopardy. Although a contract was signed for the race to run until 1990, the Pocono 500 was removed from the CART schedule starting in 1990 after further safety complaints in 1989. However, Mattioli stated that the event's departure was instead due to its lack of profitability.

Pocono Raceway underwent heavy renovations throughout the 1990s. In 1990, the venue underwent a beautification project, with the renovations including the addition of a concrete wall in the first and second turns, the planting of 500 trees and additional flowers outside the tri-oval's perimeter, and the improvement of the track's sewer system. In the next two years, the track added two new grandstands, adding a 5,000-seat and a 5,100-seat grandstand in 1991 and 1992, respectively. In 1994, Mattioli began efforts to buy out minority shareholders in the company in a last-ditch effort to amass funds for further expansion after the venue was denied from separating from the Tunkhannock Township to become its own borough. In an interview from the same year, he expressed hopes of expanding the track complex to include a dual hotel and convention center building, a water park, and the addition of 20,000 seats. The following year, a $5 million, three-year improvement project was completed, which revamped the garages and added various amenities. In 1996, the tri-oval was fully repaved; the first complete pave of the main track since its opening. That same year, Mattioli denied rumors of selling the facility to racetrack owner Bruton Smith, stating in the Times Leader, "The raceway is in trust to my grandchildren, and that's written in stone." Seating additions of 15,000 and 17,000 seats were constructed in 1997 and 1999, respectively, with the latter expansion also including a $7 million garage area renovation. According to Mattioli in an interview with The Philadelphia Inquirer, from 1990 to 2000, he spent an average of $3 million annually in expanding the venue's amenities. Sometime during these renovations, the original 0.750 mi (1.207 km) oval was removed from the venue's layouts.

=== 2000s to present day ===
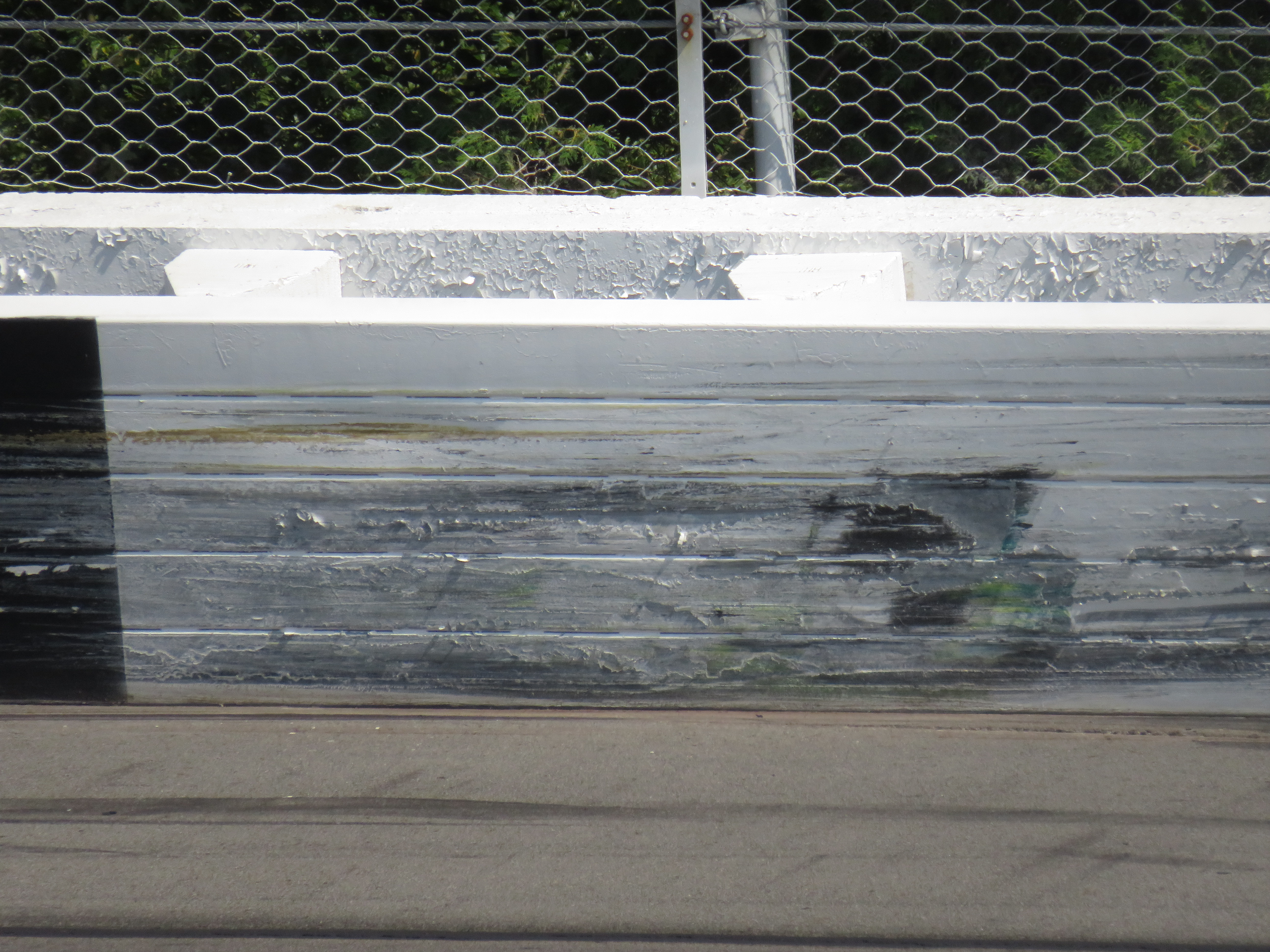
A SAFER barrier at Pocono Raceway (pictured in 2022). Starting in 2004, SAFER barriers were installed at the venue in the aftermath of the death of Dale Earnhardt.

In 2004, SAFER barriers were installed around the outside perimeter of the tri-oval in the safety push after Dale Earnhardt's death at the 2001 Daytona 500. That same year, Pocono Raceway officials expressed interest for applying for a slots license to open a casino, unveiling design plans for a $300 million, 200,000 sq ft (19,000 m^{2}) complex in January 2005. However, the idea was scrapped in December after Mattioli realized that due to Pennsylvania laws, he and his family would have no control over running the facility, which he opposed. In 2006, in lieu of a casino, officials announced plans to build a $50 million, 250-unit "gated community" resort. Construction on the resort started the following year after initial delays, with the first 56 units of the resort opening in September 2009. Also in 2007, Mattioli's grandson, Brandon Igdalsky, was appointed as Pocono Raceway's president. After cracks began to appear in the third turn of the tri-oval, the turn was repaved in 2008 in time for that year's Pennsylvania 500. In 2009, groundbreaking began on a 25 acres (10 ha) solar panel farm to completely power the track with alternative energy; the farm was completed the following year. In response to safety concerns, following a crash where NASCAR driver Kasey Kahne's car almost went outside the track's barriers at the 2010 Gillette Fusion ProGlide 500, "more than" 5,500 ft (1,700 m) of SAFER barriers and 6,100 ft (1,900 m) of catchfence was installed from turn one to turn three.

==== Post-Mattioli era ====
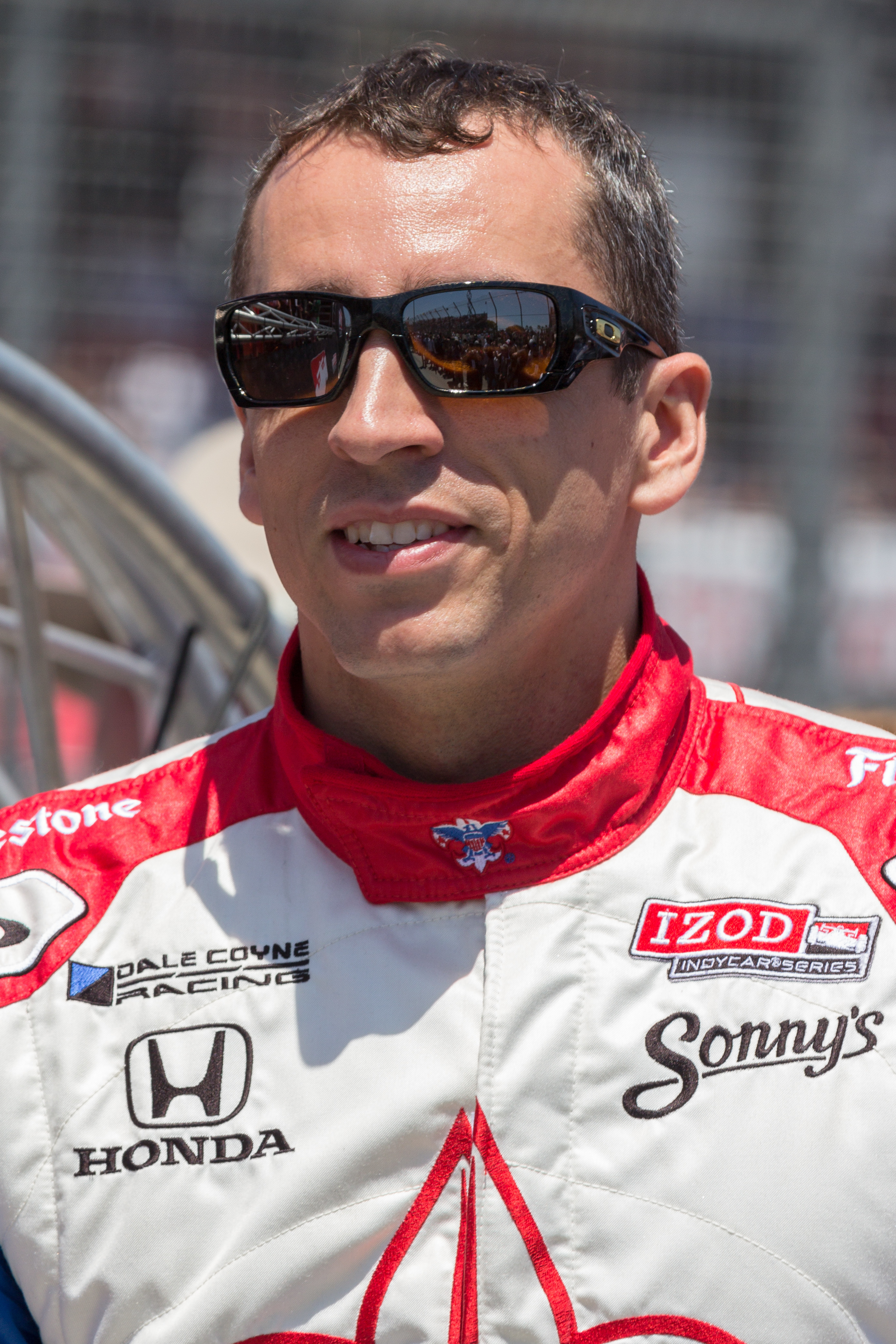
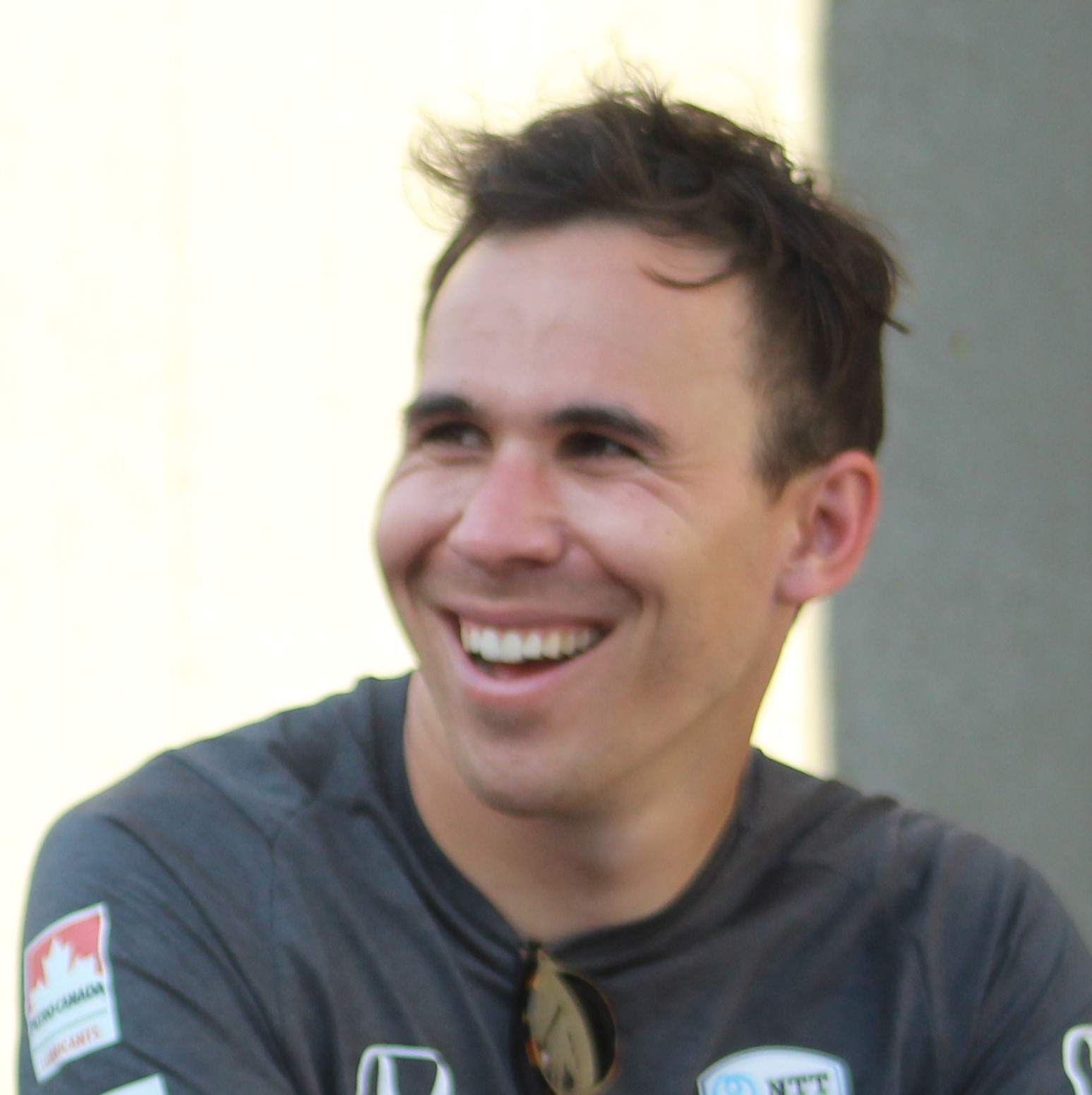
As a result of safety concerns at the track; primarily caused over the death of Justin Wilson (left) in 2015 and life-altering crash of Robert Wickens (right) in 2018, the IndyCar Series dropped Pocono Raceway after their 2019 season.

On August 5, 2011, Mattioli announced his retirement as CEO of Pocono Raceway replaced by his grandson Brandon. Two months into Brandon's tenure, track officials announced the first complete repaving of the track since 1996; the repave was completed in time for the 2012 Pocono 400. In August 2012, during the 2012 Pennsylvania 400, one fan was killed and nine others were injured when they were struck by lightning during a thunderstorm. A month later, track officials announced the return of major open-wheel racing with the IndyCar Series scheduling a race for their 2013 season. Upgrades to the track's infield road course and the removal of curbing on the tri-oval's second turn were made in 2013 and 2014, respectively. In 2015, the venue experienced its second fatality after IndyCar driver Justin Wilson was hit in the head by a flying nose cone. In the following two years, additional SAFER barriers were installed, with it completely surrounding the outside perimeter of the track. In August 2017, Brandon resigned from his position to take a job in NASCAR, with Brandon's younger brother, Nick, named as CEO of the track. In 2019, following safety concerns after the death of Wilson alongside a crash at the 2018 ABC Supply 500 that paralyzed driver Robert Wickens, IndyCar dropped the track from its schedule starting in 2020. Two years later, NASCAR dropped one of its two races from its schedule starting in 2022.

== Events ==
=== Racing events ===
==== NASCAR ====
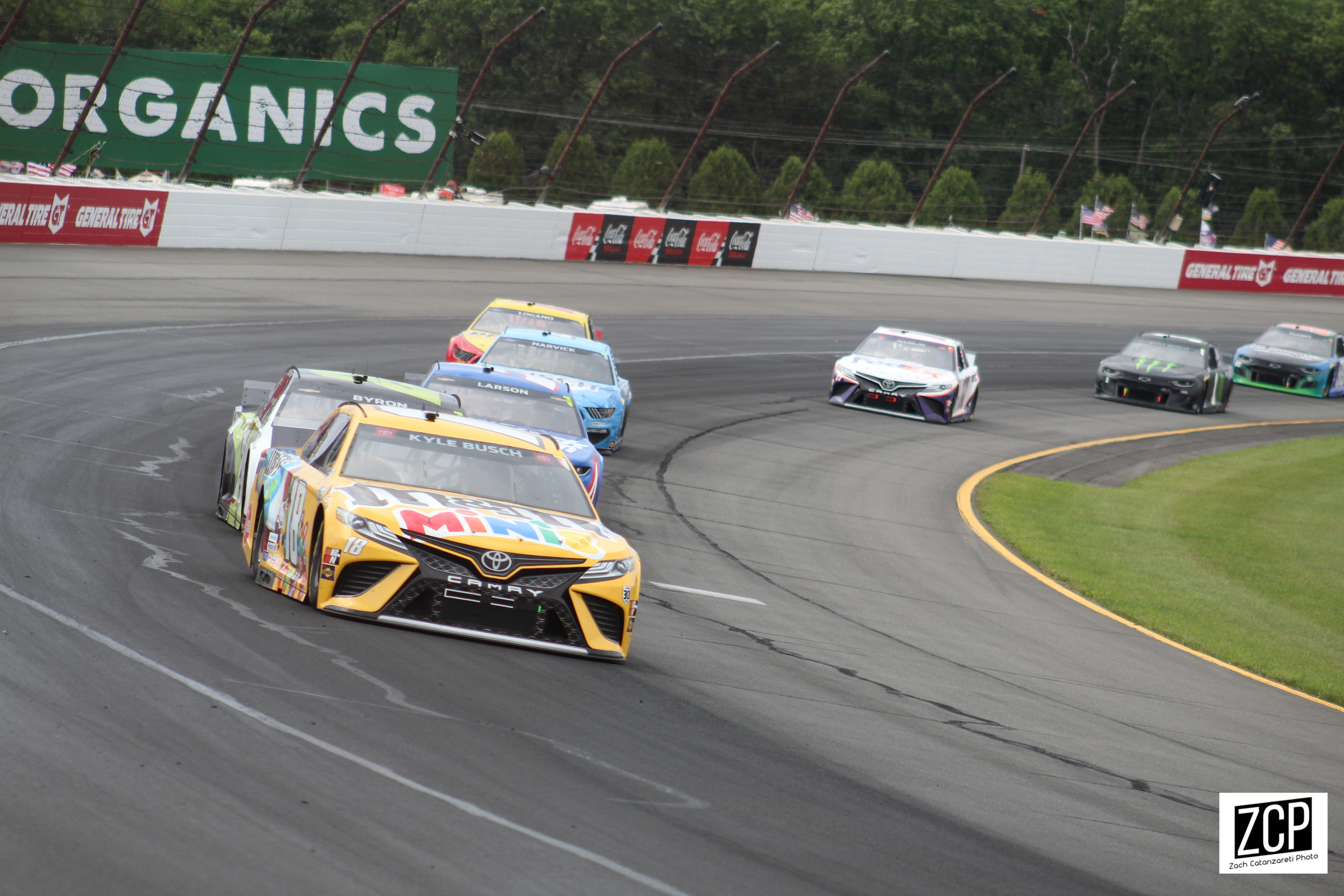
A NASCAR Cup Series race at Pocono Raceway in 2021. Since 1974, the series has raced at the venue annually.

Pocono Raceway hosts one annual NASCAR weekend, highlighted with a NASCAR Cup Series race known as The Great American Getaway 400. The facility also hosts the NASCAR O'Reilly Auto Parts Series' MillerTech Battery 250, the NASCAR Truck Series' MillerTech Battery 200 as support races. In 2020, NASCAR ran its first multi-series tripleheader, with all three races running on the same day as a result of a Truck Series race being delayed due to rain.

==== Open-wheel racing ====
The first major open-wheel races at Pocono Raceway were run in 1971 on tri-oval as the track layout's first event, with the 500 mi (800 km) event being sanctioned by the United States Auto Club (USAC). In 1982, control of the event was handed over to Championship Auto Racing Teams (CART) after the organization had split from USAC three years prior. Seven years later, after numerous safety complaints, the event was dropped by CART starting in 1990. After a 22-year absence, open-wheel racing returned with the IndyCar Series in 2013. However, after further safety concerns and complaints in the wake of the fatal crash of Justin Wilson and a crash that paralyzed driver Robert Wickens, the series decided to discontinue racing at the facility and pull the track from their schedule after 2019.

==== Other racing events ====
- From 1975 to 1976, Pocono Raceway held an annual Trans-Am Series race.
- From 1981 to 1985, Pocono Raceway held an annual IMSA GT Championship race.

=== Non-racing events ===
- In 1972, Pocono Raceway held Concert 10, a two-day rock music festival that had an estimated attendance of 200,000.
- Since 2022, Pocono Raceway has hosted the Elements Music Festival, an EDM music and arts festival.

== Lap records ==
As of June 2026, the fastest official race lap records at Pocono Raceway are listed as:

Category	Time	Driver	Vehicle	Event
Tri-Oval (1971–present): 2.500 mi (4.023 km)
IndyCar	0:40.9009	Ryan Briscoe	Dallara DW12	2014 Pocono IndyCar 500
Indy Lights	0:47.8590	Gabby Chaves	Dallara IPS	2013 Pocono Indy Lights round
NASCAR Cup	0:51.298	Kyle Busch	Toyota Camry	2017 Overton's 400
NASCAR Xfinity	0:53.455	Christopher Bell	Toyota GR Supra NASCAR	2019 Pocono Green 250
NASCAR Truck	0:53.609	Sheldon Creed	Chevrolet Silverado	2021 CRC Brakleen 150
ARCA Menards	0:55.334	Gio Ruggiero	Toyota Camry	2026 Sunset Hill Shooting Range 150
Road Course (1985–present): 2.500 mi (4.023 km)
IMSA GTP	1:15.440	Al Holbert	Porsche 962	1985 Grand Prix at Pocono
IMSA GTO	1:23.080	Craig Carter	Chevrolet Camaro	1985 Grand Prix at Pocono
IMSA GTP Lights	1:24.940	Kelly Marsh	Argo JM16	1985 Grand Prix at Pocono
IMSA GTU	1:30.030	Bob Earl	Pontiac Fiero	1985 Grand Prix at Pocono
Road Course (1973–1984): 2.800 mi (4.506 km)
F5000	1:20.200	Danny Ongais (Note: Both drivers took the same lap time independently.); Vern Schuppan	Lola T332C; Eagle 755	1976 Pocono F5000 round
IMSA GTP	1:23.280	Sarel van der Merwe	March 84G	1984 Grand Prix at Pocono
IMSA GTX	1:26.940	Jim Adams	Lola T600	1981 Kenwood Stereo 500
IMSA GTO	1:30.800	David Hobbs	BMW 320i Turbo	1977 Pocono Carquest Twin Grand Prix
Trans-Am	1:34.000	Al Holbert	Porsche 934	1976 Pocono Trans-Am round
IMSA GTU	1:36.280	Elliott Forbes-Robinson	Porsche 924 Carrera	1984 Grand Prix at Pocono
Short Road Course (1969–1984): 1.800 mi (2.897 km)
F5000	0:54.344	Eppie Wietzes	Lola T330	1973 Pocono F5000 round
