= Eagle Mk.5 =

- Category: SCCA Formula A
- Constructor: Eagle
- Successor: Eagle 73A

Technical specifications
- Chassis: Steel and aluminium monocoque with load-bearing engine-transmission assembly
- Suspension (front): Independent, wishbones and inclined coil spring/shock absorber units
- Suspension (rear): Independent, single top link, twin tower links and coil spring/shock absorber units
- Length: 150 in (3,800 mm)
- Axle track: Front: 56 in (1,400 mm); Rear: 56 in (1,400 mm)
- Wheelbase: 96.03 in (2,439 mm)
- Engine: Mid-engine, longitudinally mounted, 4,940 cc (301.5 cu in), Chevrolet, 90° V8, NA
- Transmission: Hewland L.G.500 5-speed manual
- Weight: 1,470 lb (670 kg)

Competition history
- Debut: 1968

The Eagle Mk.5 was an open-wheel race car designed and built by Eagle for use in Formula 5000 racing, which the team used to make their competitive racing debut in 1968, and competed until 1972. The Eagle Mk.5 was powered by the commonly used 5.0-liter Chevrolet V8 engine.

== History ==
The Mk.5 was originally designed by AAR Eagle for Formula A, held in the USA. However, Dan Gurney commissioned the designer Tony Southgate to build the vehicle according to the regulations of the US Formula 5000 championship. Southgate designed a vehicle with a narrow monocoque, which also corresponded to the technical conditions of the USAC championship at the time. With only minor adjustments and a different engine, the car was also able to compete in the Indianapolis 500-mile race. The vehicle was powered by a Chevrolet 5-liter V8 engine.

The Mk5 became the dominant vehicle in the US Formula 5000 championship in the late 1960s. In 1968 Lou Sell and George Wintersteen entered the Mk5 for Eagle. Sell won five races of the season and Winterstein two, with only one race win not going to an Mk.5 when Jerry Hansen won at Elkhart Lake on a Lola T140. Lou Sell won the championship in a superior manner.

In 1969 Tony Adamowicz won five of the first six races in the Mk5, but then the winning streak broke. This was due on the one hand to the lack of further development of the car concept and on the other hand to the emerging competition from the McLaren M10 and the Surtees TS5. The successes in the first half of the championship were enough for Adamowicz to win the championship for Milestone Racing.
