= Billy Baker (boxer) =

English boxer

Personal information
- Nationality: English (England)
- Born: Billy Baker; 1894 West Derby, England
- Died: Unknown
- Weight: Bantamweight

Boxing career

Boxing record
- Total fights: 29
- Wins: 11
- Win by KO: 10+8
- Losses: 17
- Draws: 1
- No contests: 0

Billy Baker (born 1894 in West Derby, England) was an English professional boxer.

Born in West Derby, Baker's professional boxing career lasted from 1946 to 1955.

He was married but he and his wife had no children.
