= Shadow DN6 =

Shadow DN6 Shadow DN6B
- Category: Formula 5000
- Constructor: Shadow
- Designer: Tony Southgate

Technical specifications
- Chassis: Aluminium monocoque with rear sub-frame
- Suspension (front): Double wishbone, Rocker-actuated Coil springs over Dampers, Anti-roll bar
- Suspension (rear): Twin lower links, Single top link, Twin trailing arms, Coil springs over Dampers, Anti-roll bar
- Length: 150 in (3,800 mm)
- Axle track: Front: 56 in (1,400 mm); Rear: 56 in (1,400 mm)
- Wheelbase: 96.03 in (2,439 mm)
- Engine: Mid-engine, longitudinally mounted, 4,940–5,000 cc (301.5–305.1 cu in), Chevrolet/Dodge, 90° V8, NA
- Transmission: Hewland T.L.200 5-speed manual
- Power: 530 hp (400 kW)
- Weight: 1,451 lb (658 kg)

Competition history
- Notable drivers: Jackie Oliver
- Debut: 1975

The Shadow DN6 was a race car designed and built by Shadow Racing Cars for Formula 5000 racing in 1975, and competed until 1976, when the SCCA Continental Championship dissolved. It was driven by Jackie Oliver, who only managed to win one race with it, at Road America in 1976. The DN6, was powered by both a 5.0-liter Chevrolet V8 engine, but also later used a Dodge 305 cu in (5.00 L) small-block engine.
