= Eagle 73A/74A =

Eagle 73A Eagle 74A
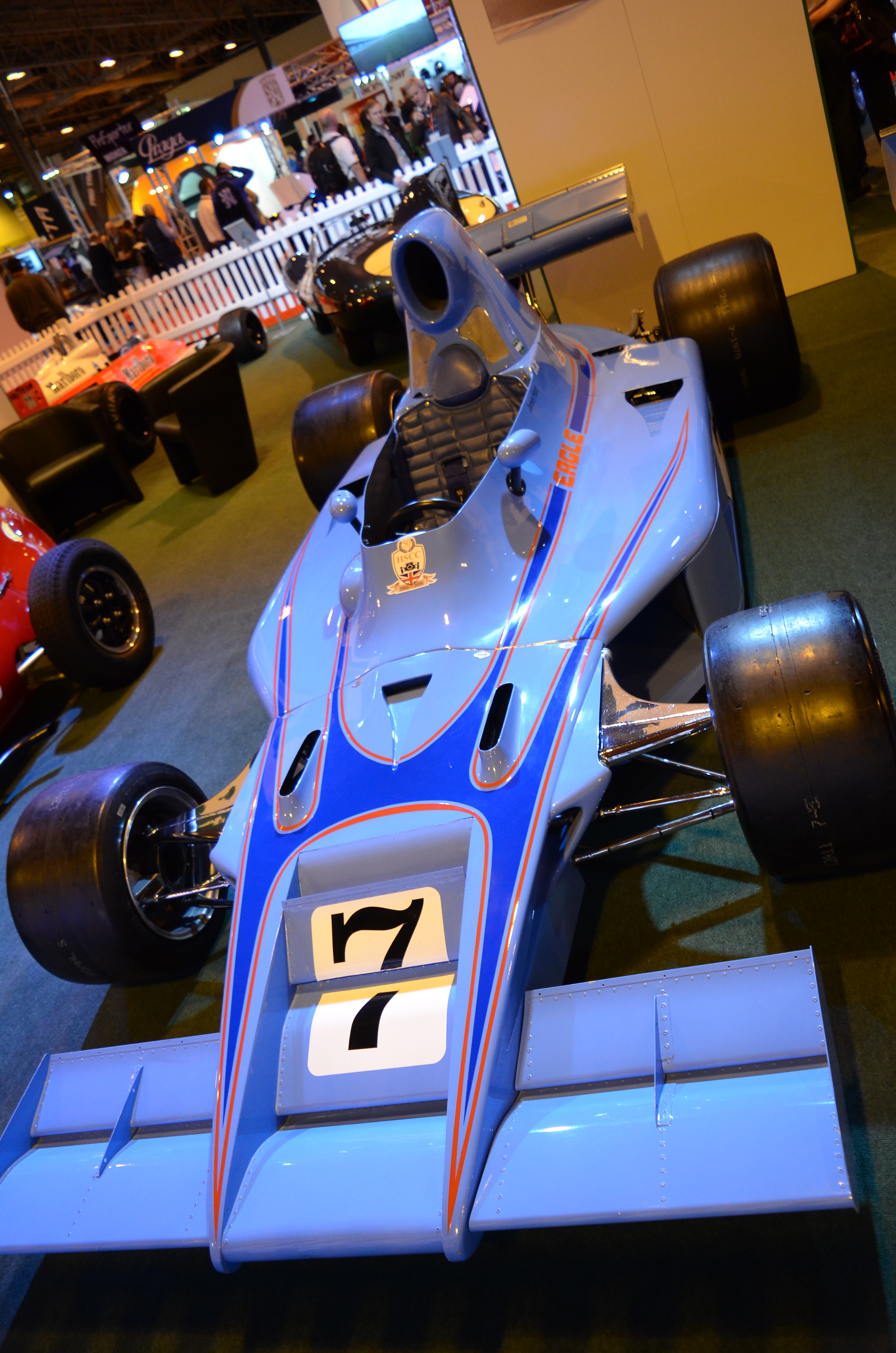
- Category: Formula 5000
- Constructor: Eagle
- Predecessor: Eagle Mk.5
- Successor: Eagle 755

Technical specifications
- Chassis: Steel and aluminium monocoque with load-bearing engine-transmission assembly
- Suspension (front): Independent, wishbones and inclined coil spring/shock absorber units
- Suspension (rear): Independent, single top link, twin tower links and coil spring/shock absorber units
- Length: 178 in (4,500 mm)
- Axle track: Front: 63 in (1,600 mm); Rear: 63 in (1,600 mm)
- Wheelbase: 102.4 in (2,600 mm)
- Engine: Mid-engine, longitudinally mounted, 4,940 cc (301.5 cu in), Chevrolet, 90° V8, NA
- Transmission: 5-speed manual
- Weight: 1,575 lb (714 kg)

Competition history
- Debut: 1973

The Eagle 73A and Eagle 74A, also designated as the Eagle FA-73 and Eagle FA-74, respectively, were race cars designed and built by Eagle for use in Formula 5000 racing and made their racing debut in 1973, and competed until 1974. Both the Eagle 73A and 74A were powered by the commonly used 5.0-liter Chevrolet V8 engine.
