= Vel's Parnelli Jones Racing =

American racecar team and constructor

Parnelli Jones Racing
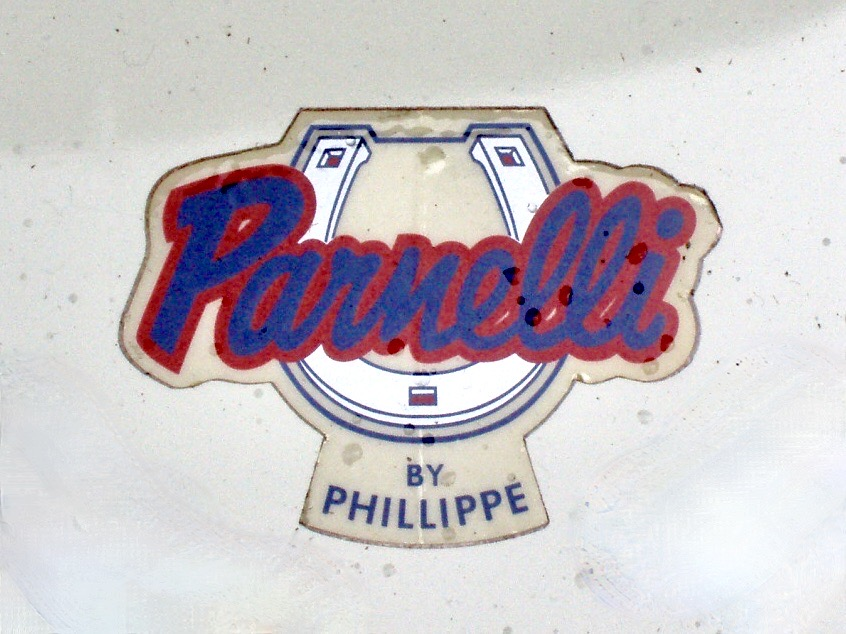
- Full name: Vel's Parnelli Jones Racing
- Founder(s): Parnelli Jones; Velko Miletich
- Noted drivers: (United States) Mario Andretti (United States) Al Unser (United States) Joe Leonard

Formula One World Championship career
- First entry: 1974 Canadian Grand Prix
- Races entered: 16
- Engines: Cosworth
- Constructors' Championships: 0 (best finish: 10th, 1975)
- Drivers' Championships: 0
- Race victories: 0 (best finish: 4th, 1975 Swedish Grand Prix)
- Points: 6
- Pole positions: 0 (best grid position: 3rd, 1974 United States Grand Prix)
- Fastest laps: 1
- Final entry: 1976 United States Grand Prix West

Vel's Parnelli Jones Racing, commonly referred to simply as Parnelli or VPJ, was a motor racing constructor and team from the United States. The team was formed in 1969 by former USAC racer Parnelli Jones and his business partner Velko "Vel" Miletich. Parnelli was initially solely concerned with USAC racing, where success came quickly; their driver Al Unser won the Indianapolis 500 race in 1970, driving a VPJ Colt, after leading 190 of the 200 racing laps. Unser went on to win the USAC championship. Unser repeated the Indy 500 win in 1971 with a new Colt built without the left side chassis offset that had been made illegal by 1971 rules, ending the season in fourth place in the USAC drivers points while teammate Joe Leonard won the championship.

== Racing ==
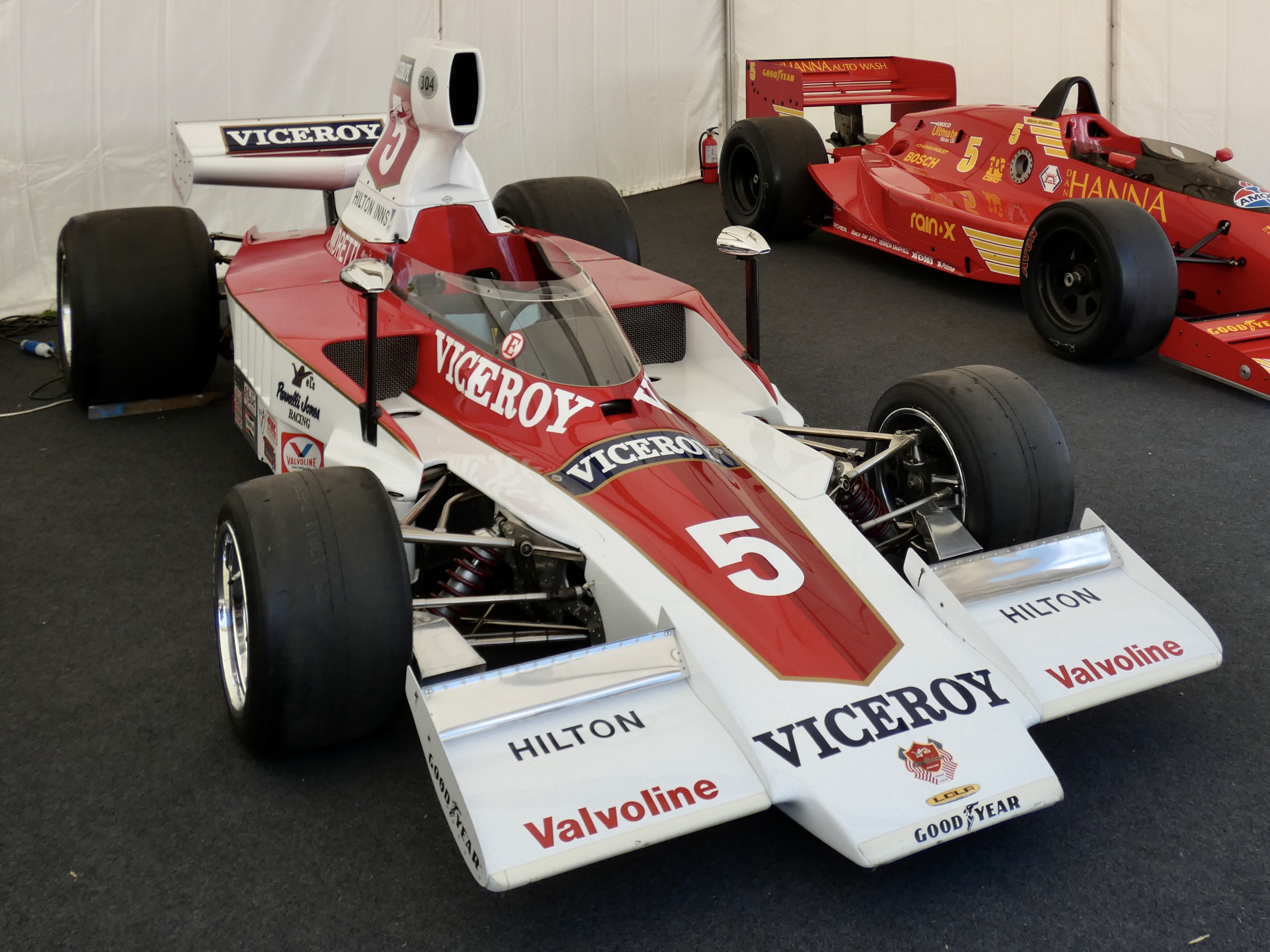
Lola T332-Chevrolet as entered by the Parnelli team for Al Unser in F5000 in 1976, Goodwood Festival of Speed 2021

Parnelli secured the services of ex-Team Lotus designer Maurice Philippe and driver Mario Andretti for USAC racing in the early 1970s, and in 1974 decided to move into Formula One racing, with financial support from tire manufacturer Firestone. After a brief foray into Formula One at the end of the 1974 season, Vel's Parnelli Jones mounted a full campaign in 1975. Their Parnelli VPJ4 car owed much to Philippe's Lotus 72 design. It appeared for the North American races at the end of the 1974 season and was gradually developed through 1975. However, Firestone's decision to quit racing at the beginning of 1975 meant that a major partner was lost. Jones was unable to find a replacement title sponsor and despite improvements made to the car the team folded only three races into the 1976 season. Andretti only learned of the Formula One team's future from journalist Chris Economaki, as he sat in the car on the grid for the Long Beach Grand Prix. This led to some bad feeling between Andretti and Jones, and Andretti returned to Lotus for the remainder of the season. In total, Vel's Parnelli Jones participated in 16 Grands Prix and scored 6 championship points.

Concurrent with the Formula One venture, VPJ was developing a turbocharged version of Cosworth's legendary DFV V8 Formula One engine, building on their experience from the previous two years. It was developed at their facility in Torrance, California, under the direction of engine builder Larry Slutter and dyno engineer Takeo "Chickie" Hirashima. The car debuted at the Speedway in 1975 in a modified Indy version of the Formula One Parnelli chassis, although it was not run regularly until late in 1976. This private project was quickly adopted by Cosworth itself, and the Parnelli engine evolved into the equally legendary Cosworth DFX, an engine which would go on to win every Indianapolis 500 race and USAC/CART Championship between 1978 and 1987.

== IndyCar champions ==
| Year | Champion | Wins | Chassis | Engine | Tires |
|---|---|---|---|---|---|
| 1970 | (United States) Al Unser | 10 | Colt, King | Ford | Firestone |
| 1971 | (United States) Joe Leonard | 1 | Colt 70, Colt 71 | Ford | Firestone |
| 1972 | (United States) Joe Leonard (2) | 3 | Parnelli VPJ1 | Offenhauser | Firestone |

== Indianapolis 500 victories ==
| Year | Champion | Chassis | Engine | Tires |
|---|---|---|---|---|
| 1970 | (United States) Al Unser | Colt 70 | Ford | Firestone |
| 1971 | (United States) Al Unser (2) | Colt 71 | Ford | Firestone |

== Complete Formula One results ==
(key)

| Year | Chassis | Engine | Tires | Drivers | 1 | 2 | 3 | 4 | 5 | 6 | 7 | 8 | 9 | 10 | 11 | 12 | 13 | 14 | 15 | 16 | Points | WCC |
|---|---|---|---|---|---|---|---|---|---|---|---|---|---|---|---|---|---|---|---|---|---|---|
| 1974 | Parnelli VPJ4 | Ford Cosworth DFV V8 | F | | ARG | BRA | RSA | ESP | BEL | MON | SWE | NED | FRA | GBR | GER | AUT | ITA | CAN | USA | | 0 | NC |
| 1974 | Parnelli VPJ4 | Ford Cosworth DFV V8 | F | (United States) Mario Andretti | | | | | | | | | | | | | | 7 | DSQ | | 0 | NC |
| 1975 | Parnelli VPJ4 | Ford Cosworth DFV V8 | F G | | ARG | BRA | RSA | ESP | MON | BEL | SWE | NED | FRA | GBR | GER | AUT | ITA | USA | | | 5 | 10th |
| 1975 | Parnelli VPJ4 | Ford Cosworth DFV V8 | F G | (United States) Mario Andretti | Ret | 7 | 17 | Ret^{F} | Ret | | 4 | | 5 | 12 | 10 | Ret | Ret | Ret | | | 5 | 10th |
| 1976 | Parnelli VPJ4B | Ford Cosworth DFV V8 | G | | BRA | RSA | USW | ESP | BEL | MON | SWE | FRA | GBR | GER | AUT | NED | ITA | CAN | USA | JPN | 1 | 13th |
| 1976 | Parnelli VPJ4B | Ford Cosworth DFV V8 | G | (United States) Mario Andretti | | 6 | Ret | | | | | | | | | | | | | | 1 | 13th |

=== Non-Championship results ===
(key)

| Year | Chassis | Engine | Driver | 1 | 2 | 3 |
|---|---|---|---|---|---|---|
| 1975 | Parnelli VPJ4 | Ford Cosworth DFV 3.0 V8 | | ROC | INT | SUI |
| 1975 | Parnelli VPJ4 | Ford Cosworth DFV 3.0 V8 | (United States) Mario Andretti | | 3 | |
