= 1976 United States Grand Prix West =

Race 3 of 16 in the 1976 Formula One season
← Previous race	Next race →
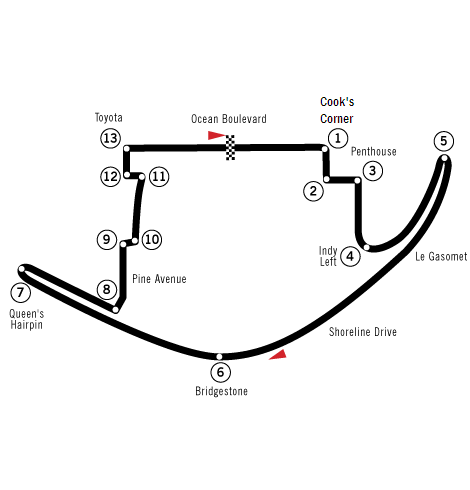

Race details
- Date: March 28, 1976
- Official name: II United States Grand Prix West
- Location: Long Beach Street Circuit
- Course: Temporary street course
- Course length: 3.251 km (2.02 miles)
- Distance: 80 laps, 260.08 km (161.60 miles)
- Weather: 70 °F (21 °C); winds of 15 miles per hour (24 km/h)

Pole position
Driver	(Switzerland) Clay Regazzoni	Ferrari
- Time: 1:23.099

Fastest lap
Driver	(Switzerland) Clay Regazzoni	Ferrari
- Time: 1:23.076 on lap 61

Podium
First	(Switzerland) Clay Regazzoni	Ferrari
Second	(Austria) Niki Lauda	Ferrari
Third	(France) Patrick Depailler	Tyrrell-Ford

The 1976 United States Grand Prix West was a Formula One motor race held on March 28, 1976, in Long Beach Street Circuit. The race was the third round of the 1976 Formula One season and the first new race to be added to the calendar since the Brazilian and Swedish Grand Prix were added in 1973. It was the second Formula One race held in California, the first being the 1960 United States Grand Prix at Riverside. The race was held over 80 laps of the 3.251-kilometre street circuit for a total race distance of 260 kilometres.

The race was won by Swiss driver Clay Regazzoni in a Ferrari 312T by 42 seconds over team mate and championship points leader, Austrian driver Niki Lauda. French driver Patrick Depailler finished third driving a Tyrrell 007.

== Summary ==
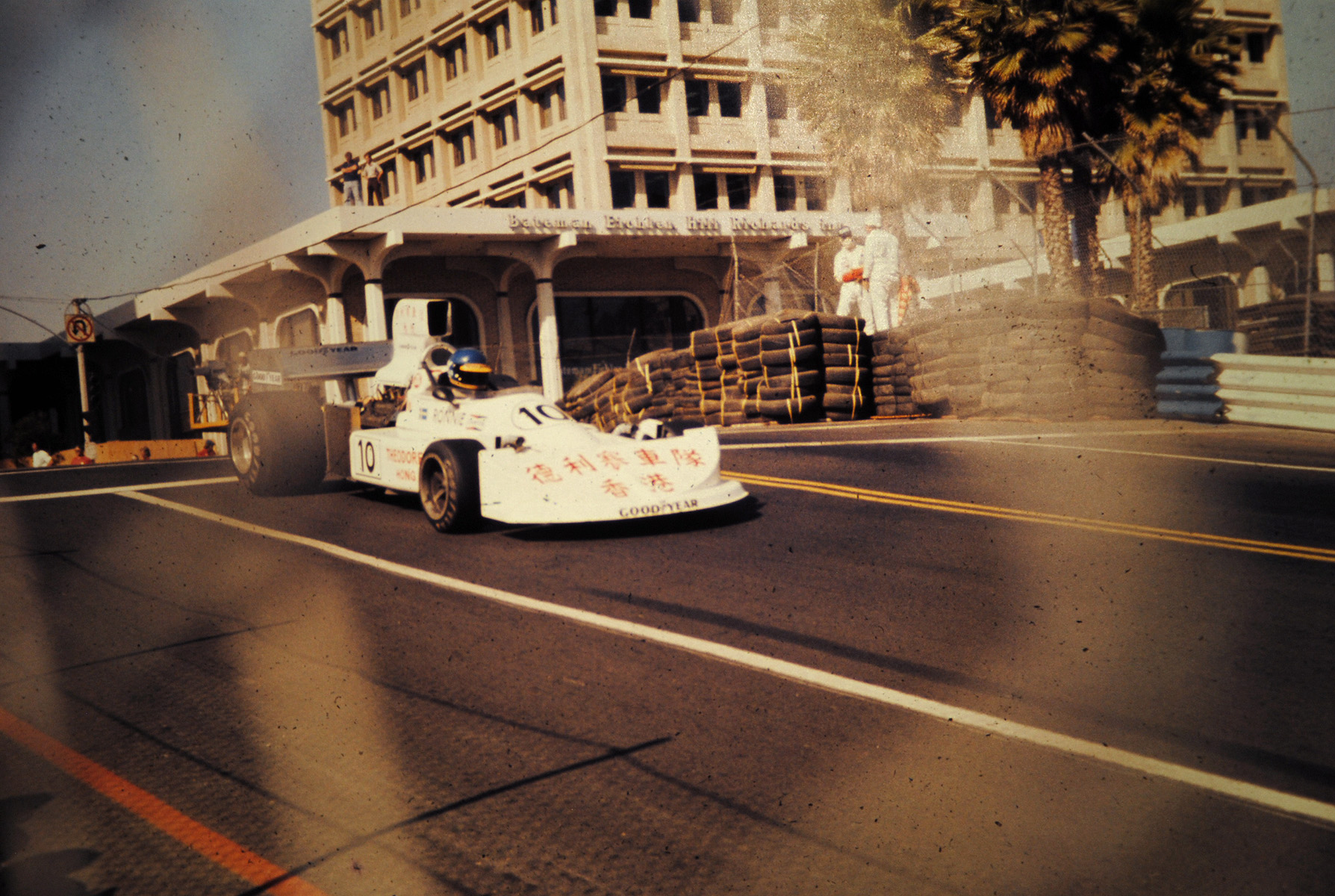
Ronnie Peterson

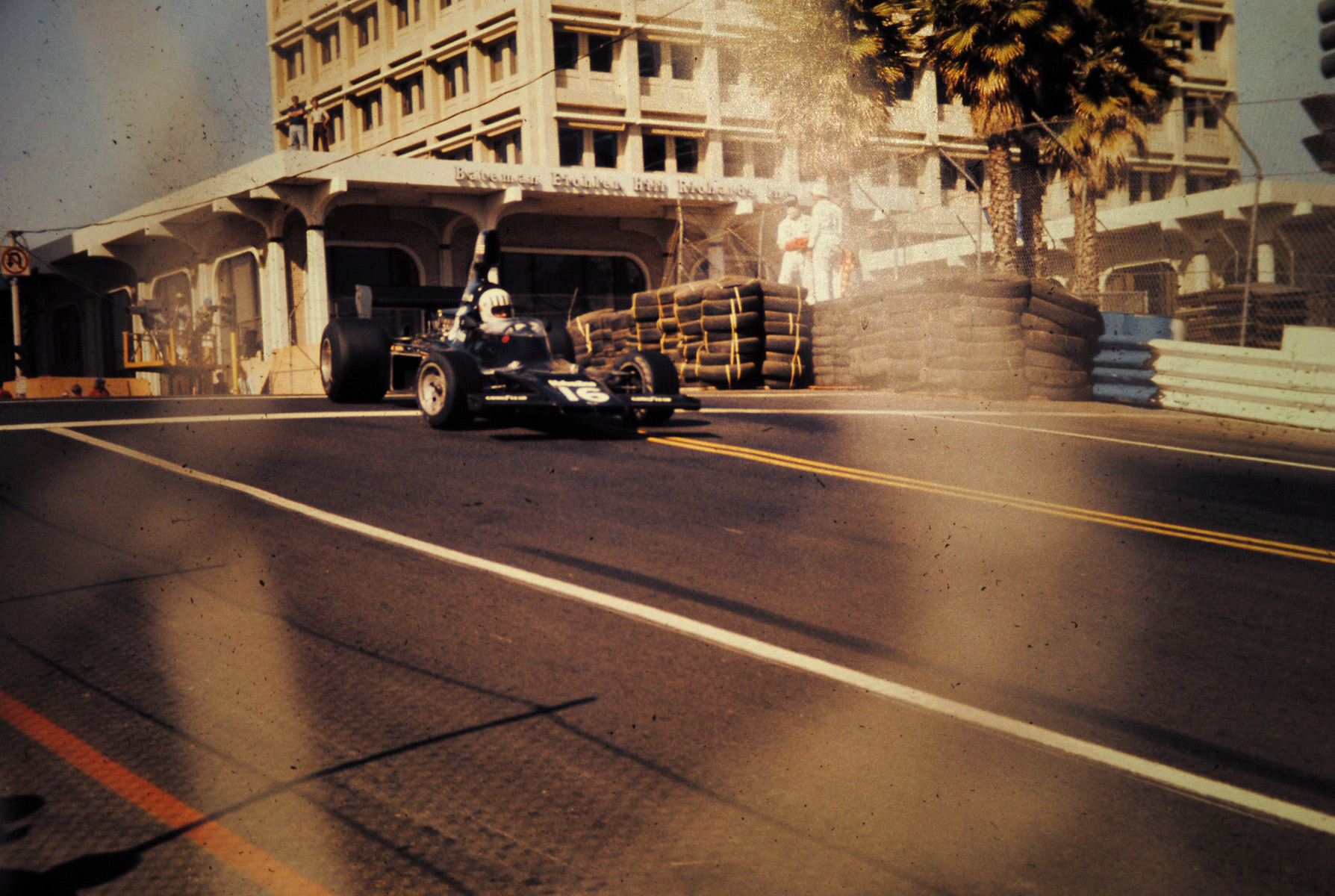
Tom Pryce

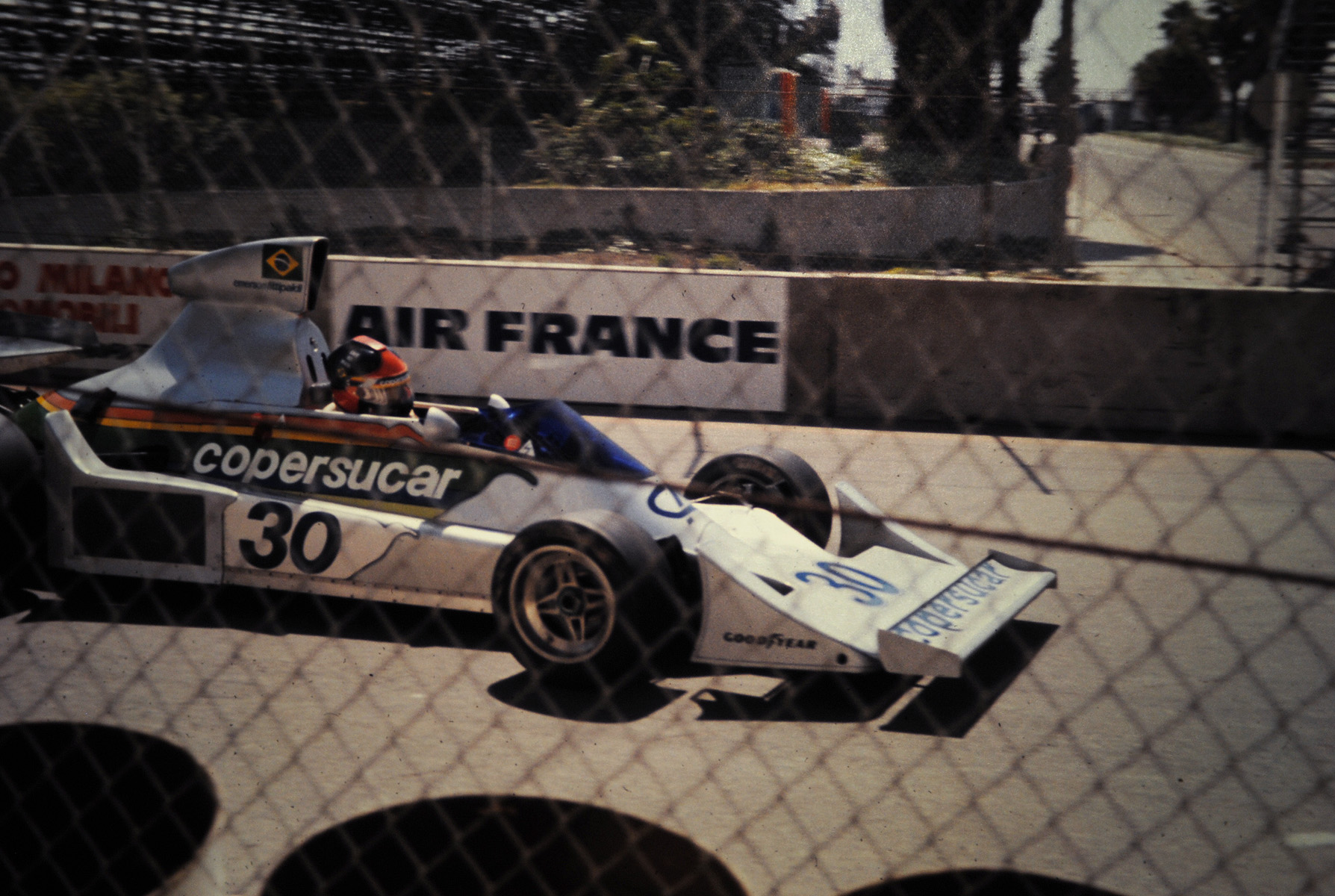
Emerson Fittipaldi

Italy was the first country to host two Championship Formula One races in the same year in 1957. The United States would become the second as the first USGP West at Long Beach Street Circuit, appeared on the 1976 F1 calendar, along with the long-standing autumn race at Watkins Glen, New York. The new race's organizers, headed by British businessman and Long Beach resident Chris Pook, attempted to create an 'American Monaco', which they successfully did. A supporting vintage Grand Prix race was held with former champions Juan Manuel Fangio, Denny Hulme, Jack Brabham, as well as Stirling Moss, Carroll Shelby, Rene Dreyfus, Richie Ginther, Innes Ireland and Maurice Trintignant. Dan Gurney and Phil Hill were also in attendance as co-directors of the event.

When the cars took to the track, the drivers differed in their opinions of the concrete-lined street circuit which featured two hairpins and a long, curving waterfront "straight." Ferrari's reigning World Champion Niki Lauda said the course was much bumpier than Monaco and harder on the car, but easier on the driver. Emerson Fittipaldi said he liked it very much, but Frenchmen Jacques Laffite and Patrick Depailler would not agree. In qualifying, Lauda led first, then James Hunt's McLaren, and finally Clay Regazzoni in the second Ferrari. After spending much of the session with ignition trouble, Depailler made a last-minute bid and slotted his Tyrrell onto the front row in second, less than two-tenths off the Ferrari's pace. The Formula One Constructors' Association had decided to limit the field to twenty starters for safety reasons, because of the narrow concrete canyons necessitated by the street layout, and seven cars failed to qualify.

At the start, Regazzoni rocketed away and settled into the lead, ahead of Hunt, Depailler, and teammate Lauda. Exiting the first turn, Vittorio Brambilla squeezed Carlos Reutemann into the wall, putting both cars out. Then, on the curving back "straight" by the harbor, Gunnar Nilsson's Lotus broke its rear suspension and jerked hard into the wall at 160 miles per hour. He emerged with only a stiff neck.

On lap four, Hunt was bearing down on Depailler for second place. He tried to slip inside the Tyrrell entering the right-hand hairpin just before the back straight, but Depailler closed the door, forcing Hunt to go around on the left. As they exited the corner side-by-side, Depailler moved across and pushed the McLaren into the barrier. Hunt yanked himself from his car, certain that it was undrivable, and shook his fist at Depailler each time the Frenchman came around. After the race, the McLaren mechanics came to retrieve the car and were able to drive it back to the pits!

On the same lap, John Watson bumped Laffite's Ligier from behind, breaking the nose on his Penske. Laffite was spun around by the contact and dropped from eighth to fourteenth place. Meanwhile, Lauda made his way by Depailler on lap five and took second place, seven seconds behind Regazzoni, who was beginning to seem untouchable. Mario Andretti had moved from fifteenth on the grid to ninth in the Parnelli VPJ 4B-Ford, including the fastest lap to that point, but was finished when he lost the water in his engine (although he didn't actually stop until lap 15 when the engine had completely cooked).

This would be the last race for the American Vel's-Parnelli car. Over three seasons, it competed in 16 races, with Mario the car's only driver. Upon retiring from the race in Long Beach, Andretti was approached by a television reporter in the pits, asking, "How about this being your last race in Formula One?" Andretti replied, "What are you talking about?" The reporter said, "That's what Vel (Miletich) told me." Andretti said, "It may have been his last Grand Prix, but it won't be mine."

Andretti terminated his relationship with Miletich and Parnelli Jones that day, but the next morning, by accident, joined Lotus team manager Colin Chapman for breakfast in a Long Beach coffee shop, where the two forged an agreement. By the next season, with Andretti driving Chapman's revolutionary Lotus 78, the two were winning races together and, of course, in 1978, captured the World Championship.

At about the same time as Andretti's retirement from the race, Depailler spun and dropped from third to seventh, and after 20 laps, Regazzoni led by 13 seconds over Lauda, Jody Scheckter and Tom Pryce in the Shadow. Depailler, furious over his mistake, was storming back up the line as he got by Jean-Pierre Jarier and Ronnie Peterson within six laps. When Pryce broke a driveshaft on lap 33 and Scheckter had a front wishbone snap on lap 34, Depailler was back in third place, behind the two Ferraris.

After his incident with Watson, Laffite had driven brilliantly in just the third race for the new Matra-powered Ligier. He passed Jochen Mass on lap 45, and Jarier on lap 46 to take over fourth place. With 20 laps to go, Lauda was having trouble selecting gears and decided to try to nurse the car home rather than make a run at Regazzoni. Jarier had dropped to sixth behind Mass, also with gearbox trouble. Then, on the next to last lap, with only first and fifth gears left, he was also overtaken by Fittipaldi, who scored the first Championship point for his own Copersucar team.

Regazzoni took an easy win, the fourth of his career, completing the grand chelem of pole position, fastest lap, victory, and leading every lap. Lauda successfully brought his ailing car home second, 42 seconds back, and Depailler completed a fine recovery from his spin by taking third. The first USGP West was a success. Indeed, former team manager Rob Walker said, "I think the creation of the Long Beach GP was the greatest achievement in motor racing this decade".

== Classification ==
=== Qualifying ===
Pos.	No.	Driver	Constructor	Time/Gap
1	2	(Switzerland) Clay Regazzoni	Ferrari	1:23.099
2	4	(France) Patrick Depailler	Tyrrell–Ford	+0.193
3	11	(United Kingdom) James Hunt	McLaren–Ford	+0.321
4	1	(Austria) Niki Lauda	Ferrari	+0.548
5	16	(United Kingdom) Tom Pryce	Shadow–Ford	+0.578
6	10	(Sweden) Ronnie Peterson	March–Ford	+1.058
7	17	(France) Jean-Pierre Jarier	Shadow–Ford	+1.064
8	9	(Italy) Vittorio Brambilla	March–Ford	+1.069
9	28	(United Kingdom) John Watson	Penske–Ford	+1.071
10	7	(Argentina) Carlos Reutemann	Brabham–Alfa Romeo	+1.166
11	3	(South Africa) Jody Scheckter	Tyrrell–Ford	+1.245
12	26	(France) Jacques Laffite	Ligier–Matra	+1.343
13	8	(Brazil) Carlos Pace	Brabham–Alfa Romeo	+1.373
14	12	(West Germany) Jochen Mass	McLaren–Ford	+1.442
15	27	(United States) Mario Andretti	Parnelli–Ford	+1.467
16	30	(Brazil) Emerson Fittipaldi	Fittipaldi–Ford	+1.680
17	22	(New Zealand) Chris Amon	Ensign–Ford	+1.704
18	34	(West Germany) Hans-Joachim Stuck	March–Ford	+2.023
19	19	(Australia) Alan Jones	Surtees–Ford	+2.115
20	6	(Sweden) Gunnar Nilsson	Lotus–Ford	+2.178
21	21	(France) Michel Leclère*	Wolf-Williams–Ford	+2.337
22	31	(Brazil) Ingo Hoffmann*	Fittipaldi–Ford	+2.458
23	35	(Italy) Arturo Merzario*	March–Ford	+2.638
24	5	(United Kingdom) Bob Evans*	Lotus–Ford	+2.791
25	20	(Belgium) Jacky Ickx*	Wolf-Williams–Ford	+3.429
26	24	(Austria) Harald Ertl*	Hesketh–Ford	+3.725
27	18	(United States) Brett Lunger*	Surtees–Ford	+3.729

*Driver failed to qualify

=== Race ===
Pos	No	Driver	Constructor	Laps	Time/Retired	Grid	Points
1	2	(Switzerland) Clay Regazzoni	Ferrari	80	1:53:18.471	1	9
2	1	(Austria) Niki Lauda	Ferrari	80	+42.414	4	6
3	4	(France) Patrick Depailler	Tyrrell-Ford	80	+49.972	2	4
4	26	(France) Jacques Laffite	Ligier-Matra	80	+1:12.828	12	3
5	12	(West Germany) Jochen Mass	McLaren-Ford	80	+1:22.292	14	2
6	30	(Brazil) Emerson Fittipaldi	Fittipaldi-Ford	79	+1 lap	16	1
7	17	(France) Jean-Pierre Jarier	Shadow-Ford	79	+1 lap	7	
8	22	(New Zealand) Chris Amon	Ensign-Ford	78	+2 laps	17	
9	8	(Brazil) Carlos Pace	Brabham-Alfa Romeo	77	+3 laps	13	
10	10	(Sweden) Ronnie Peterson	March-Ford	77	+3 laps	6	
NC	19	(Australia) Alan Jones	Surtees-Ford	70	+10 laps	19	
NC	28	(United Kingdom) John Watson	Penske-Ford	69	+11 laps	9	
Ret	3	(South Africa) Jody Scheckter	Tyrrell-Ford	34	Suspension	11	
Ret	16	(United Kingdom) Tom Pryce	Shadow-Ford	32	Halfshaft	5	
Ret	27	(United States) Mario Andretti	Parnelli-Ford	15	Water leak	15	
Ret	11	(United Kingdom) James Hunt	McLaren-Ford	3	Accident	3	
Ret	34	(West Germany) Hans Joachim Stuck	March-Ford	2	Accident	18	
Ret	9	(Italy) Vittorio Brambilla	March-Ford	0	Collision	8	
Ret	7	(Argentina) Carlos Reutemann	Brabham-Alfa Romeo	0	Collision	10	
Ret	6	(Sweden) Gunnar Nilsson	Lotus-Ford	0	Suspension	20	
DNQ	21	(France) Michel Leclère	Wolf-Williams-Ford				
DNQ	31	(Brazil) Ingo Hoffmann	Fittipaldi-Ford				
DNQ	35	(Italy) Arturo Merzario	March-Ford				
DNQ	5	(United Kingdom) Bob Evans	Lotus-Ford				
DNQ	20	(Belgium) Jacky Ickx	Wolf-Williams-Ford				
DNQ	24	(Austria) Harald Ertl	Hesketh-Ford				
DNQ	18	(United States) Brett Lunger	Surtees-Ford				

== Championship standings after the race ==
Drivers' Championship standings

	Pos	Driver	Points
	1	(Austria) Niki Lauda	24
	2	(France) Patrick Depailler	10
6	3	(Switzerland) Clay Regazzoni	9
	4	(Germany) Jochen Mass	7
2	5	(United Kingdom) James Hunt	6

Constructors' Championship standings

Pos	Constructor	Points
1	(Italy) Ferrari	27
2	(United Kingdom) Tyrrell-Ford	13
3	(United Kingdom) McLaren-Ford	9
4	(United Kingdom) Shadow-Ford	4
5	(United Kingdom) March-Ford	3

- Note: Only the top five positions are included for both sets of standings.

Previous race: 1976 South African Grand Prix	FIA Formula One World Championship; 1976 season	Next race: 1976 Spanish Grand Prix
Previous race: None	United States Grand Prix West	Next race: 1977 United States Grand Prix West
Awards
Preceded by 1975 Monaco Grand Prix	Formula One Promotional Trophy for Race Promoter; 1976	Succeeded by 1977 British Grand Prix

Preceded by 1975 Long Beach Grand Prix	Grand Prix of Long Beach	Succeeded by 1977 United States Grand Prix West
