= Billy Baker (footballer, born 1892) =

English footballer

Personal information
- Full name: William Edward Baker
- Date of birth: 11 May 1892
- Place of birth: Woolwich, England
- Date of death: 1980 (aged 87–88)
- Position: Outside left

Senior career*
Years	Team	Apps	(Gls)
- Plumstead
- Northfleet United
1911–1913	Queens Park Rangers	0	(0)
1913–1914	Dartford		
1914–1921	Derby County	44	(7)
1921–1926	Plymouth Argyle	85	(11)
- Bude
- * Club domestic league appearances and goals

William Edward Baker (11 May 1892 – 1980) was a professional footballer who played as an outside left in the Football League for Plymouth Argyle and Derby County.

== Personal life ==
Baker served during the First World War and was wounded and gassed.

== Career statistics ==
Appearances and goals by club, season and competition
Club	Season	League			FA Cup		Total	
Club	Season	Division	Apps	Goals	Apps	Goals	Apps	Goals
Derby County	1914–15	Second Division	35	6	0	0	35	6
Derby County	1919–20	First Division	6	1	0	0	6	1
Derby County	1920–21	First Division	3	0	0	0	3	0
Derby County	Total		44	7	0	0	44	7
Plymouth Argyle	1921–22	Third Division South	31	5	2	1	33	6
Plymouth Argyle	1922–23	Third Division South	39	2	3	0	42	2
Plymouth Argyle	1923–24	Third Division South	14	4	0	0	14	4
Plymouth Argyle	1926–27	Third Division South	1	0	0	0	1	0
Plymouth Argyle	Total		85	11	5	1	90	12
Career total			129	18	5	1	134	19

== Honours ==
Derby County

- Football League Second Division: 1914–15
