= Bill Baker (ice hockey, born 1882) =

Canadian ice hockey player

- Born: October 26, 1882; Montreal, Quebec, Canada
- Died: February 11, 1916 (aged 33)
- Height: 5 ft 8 in (173 cm)
- Weight: 155 lb (70 kg; 11 st 1 lb)
- Position: Goaltender
- Played for: Montreal Shamrocks
- Playing career: 1902–1913

William Henry Baker (October 26, 1882 – February 11, 1916) was a Canadian professional ice hockey player. He played with the Montreal Shamrocks of the Canadian Hockey Association and the National Hockey Association.
