= Bill Baker (baseball) =

American baseball player (1911–2006)

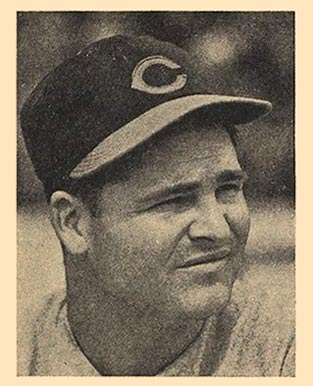
- Catcher
- Born: February 22, 1911; Paw Creek, North Carolina, U.S.
- Died: April 13, 2006 (aged 95); Myrtle Beach, South Carolina, U.S.
- Batted: Right Threw: Right

MLB debut
- May 4, 1940, for the Cincinnati Reds

Last MLB appearance
- August 1, 1949, for the St. Louis Cardinals

MLB statistics
- Batting average: .247
- Home runs: 2
- Runs batted in: 68
- Stats at Baseball Reference

Teams
- Cincinnati Reds (1940–1941); Pittsburgh Pirates (1941–1943, 1946); St. Louis Cardinals (1948–1949)

William Presley Baker (February 22, 1911 – April 13, 2006) was an American professional baseball player, coach and umpire. The catcher appeared in seven seasons in Major League Baseball for the Cincinnati Reds (1940–1941), Pittsburgh Pirates (1941–1943, 1946) and St. Louis Cardinals (1948–1949). Born in Paw Creek, Mecklenburg County, North Carolina, Baker batted and threw right-handed and was listed as 6 feet (1.8 m) tall and 200 pounds (91 kg). He played baseball and football at Boyden High School in Salisbury, North Carolina.

Baker was a .247 hitter with 145 hits, 25 doubles, five triples, two home runs and 68 RBI in 263 games played. During his career as a backup catcher in the National League, he was a member of the 1940 World Champion Cincinnati Reds. His most productive year was 1943, with Pittsburgh, when he appeared in a career-high 63 games and hit .273 with 26 RBI. Traded to St. Louis, he batted .294 in 45 games in 1948.

Following his playing career, he coached under Frankie Frisch, his old Pittsburgh manager, with the 1950 Chicago Cubs, then became an umpire in the minor leagues. Promoted to the National League in 1957, he worked in 153 games in his only season as a major-league arbiter.

Bill Baker died in Myrtle Beach, South Carolina, at the age of 95.
