= Eagle 755 =

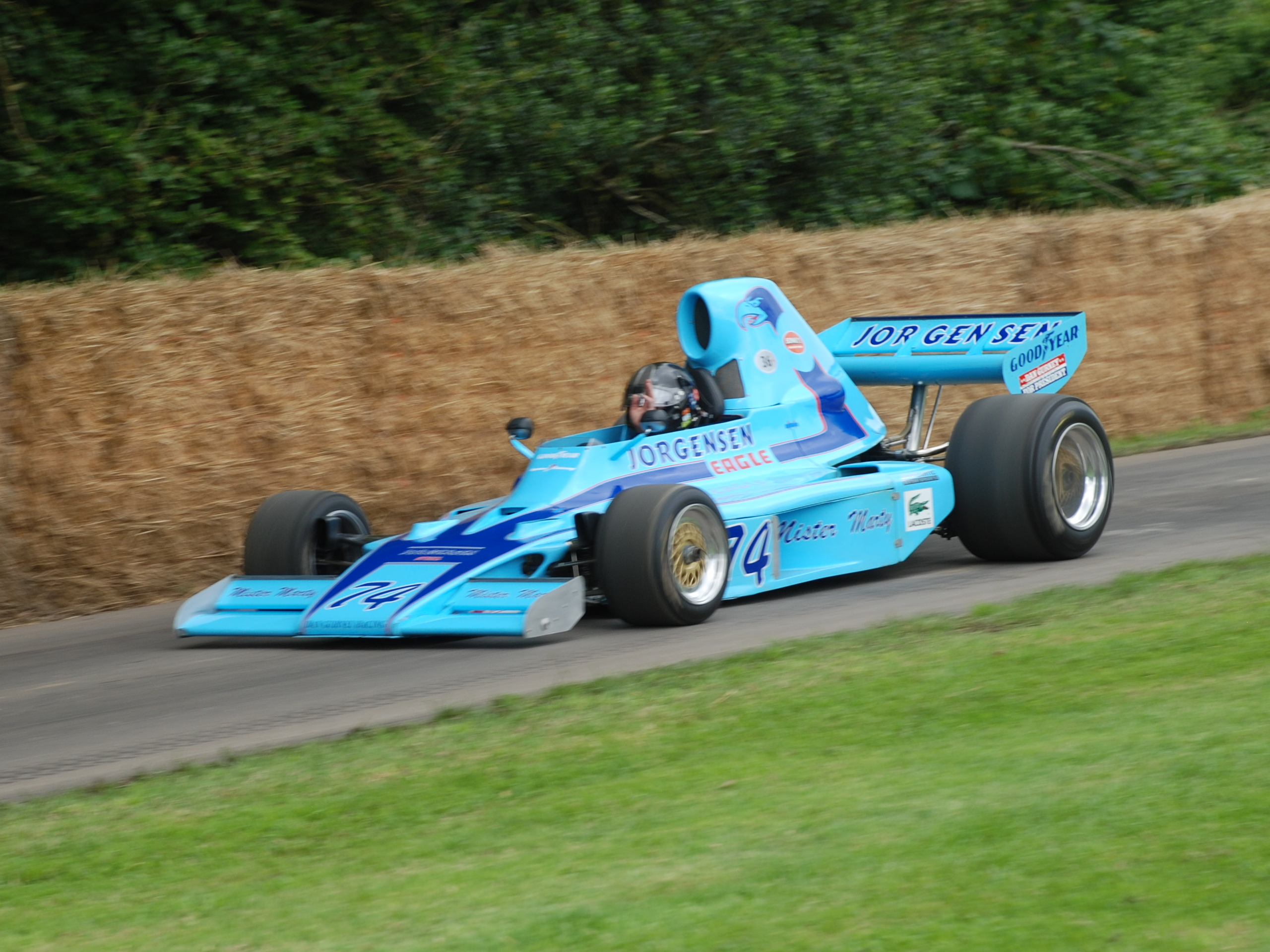
- Category: Formula 5000
- Constructor: Eagle
- Predecessor: Eagle 74A

Technical specifications
- Chassis: Steel and aluminium monocoque with load-bearing engine-transmission assembly
- Suspension (front): Independent, wishbones and inclined coil spring/shock absorber units
- Suspension (rear): Independent, single top link, twin tower links and coil spring/shock absorber units
- Length: 175 in (4,400 mm)
- Axle track: Front: 63 in (1,600 mm); Rear: 63 in (1,600 mm)
- Wheelbase: 105 in (2,700 mm)
- Engine: Mid-engine, longitudinally mounted, 4,940 cc (301.5 cu in), Chevrolet, 90° V8, NA
- Transmission: 5-speed manual
- Weight: 1,500 lb (680 kg)

Competition history
- Notable drivers: (Australia) Vern Schuppan
- Debut: 1975

The Eagle 755 was a race car designed and built by Eagle for use in Formula 5000 racing and made its racing debut in 1975, and competed until 1976, when the SCCA Continental Championship dissolved. The Eagle 755 was powered by the commonly used 5.0-liter Chevrolet V8 engine.
