= Bill Baker (racing driver) =

American racing driver (1931–1978)

- Born: William Edwin Baker; June 19, 1931; Pismo Beach, California, US
- Died: August 12, 1978 (aged 47); Novato, California, US
- Cause of death: Heart attack

NASCAR Cup Series career
- 3 races run over 2 years
- First race: 1977 Winston Western 500 (Riverside)
- Last race: 1978 NAPA 400 (Riverside)
Wins	Top tens	Poles
0	0	0

William Edwin Baker (June 19, 1931 – August 12, 1978) was an American NASCAR driver from Pismo Beach, California. He made three NASCAR Winston Cup Series starts with a best finish of 16th. Following a practice run for a 100-mile NASCAR Winston West Series race at Sears Point Raceway, Baker suffered a fatal heart attack.
