= 1975 Race of Champions =

- Non-championship race in the 1975 Formula One season

Race details
- Date: 16 March 1975
- Location: Brands Hatch Grand Prix Circuit, Fawkham, Kent, England
- Course: Permanent racing facility
- Course length: 4.206 km (2.6136 miles)
- Distance: 40 laps, 168.24 km (104.544 miles)
- Weather: Cold, Wet

Pole position
Driver	(United Kingdom) Tom Pryce	Shadow-Ford
- Time: 1:34.9

Fastest lap
Driver	(United Kingdom) Tom Pryce	Shadow-Ford
- Time: 1:21.1

Podium
First	(United Kingdom) Tom Pryce	Shadow-Ford
Second	(United Kingdom) John Watson	Surtees-Ford
Third	(Sweden) Ronnie Peterson	Lotus-Ford

The 1975 Race of Champions was a non-championship Formula One race held at Brands Hatch on 16 March 1975. Weather conditions were inhospitable, with strong winds, heavy rain and even snow showers during the weekend.

There was some pre-race controversy about the decision to top up the grid with Formula 5000 cars-eventually a compromise was reached where only those drivers with Formula 1 experience would be permitted to start.

Ironically the most vehement protester against the Formula 5000 drivers, Emerson Fittipaldi, qualified only 17th, some four rows behind the fastest Formula 5000 driver Tom Belsø.

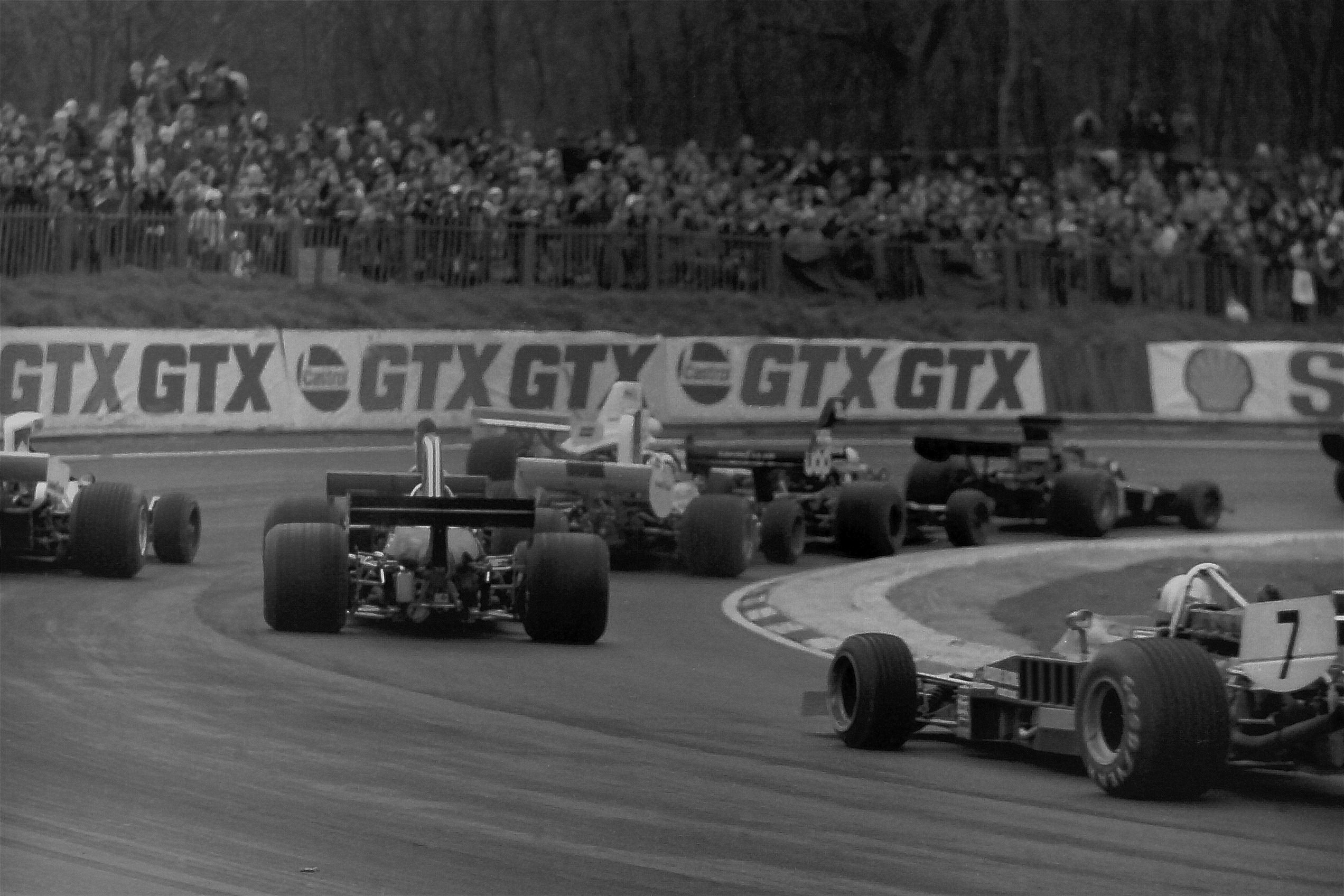
A cluster of cars rounding Druids Hill bend in the early laps of the race. At this point, eventual winner Pryce's car (centre right) is back in the pack.

Roelof Wunderink made his début in the Ensign, whilst Tony Trimmer qualified well in the new Safir car (previously known as a Token) and Maurizio Flammini was a non-starter after crashing heavily in practice.

Tom Pryce dominated in appalling weather conditions from Jody Scheckter, giving the crowd a home driver to cheer in the absence of James Hunt.

The start was delayed as snow fell and teams had to quickly decide which type of tyres to use, but when the flag fell, Jacky Ickx surged through from the second row to lead. In midfield, Belso was hit and spun taking out Jochen Mass, who retired despite having minimal damage to the car. As a result of this incident, the decision was taken to bar Formula 5000 cars from future Formula 1 races.

Scheckter took the lead at the end of lap 1 on dry tyres and Pryce was soon catching him, having passed Ronnie Peterson and Ickx after a bad start on the damp side of the track.

In second place, with a strong home following was John Watson in the Surtees who gained the place having taken Peterson when they were passing backmarkers at Druids Bend.

Despite not being a Championship round, Pryce's win makes this the only Formula One race won by a Welshman.

== Results ==
Pos.	No.	Driver	Team	Laps	Time/Retired	Grid
1	16	(United Kingdom) Tom Pryce	Shadow-Ford	40	55:53.5	1
2	18	(United Kingdom) John Watson	Surtees-Ford	40	+ 30.5	10
3	5	(Sweden) Ronnie Peterson	Lotus-Ford	40	+ 32.0	6
4	6	(Belgium) Jacky Ickx	Lotus-Ford	39	+ 1 Lap	4
5	1	(Brazil) Emerson Fittipaldi	McLaren-Ford	39	+ 1 Lap	17
6	14	(United Kingdom) Bob Evans	BRM	38	+ 2 Laps	19
7	20	(Italy) Arturo Merzario	Williams-Ford	37	+ 3 Laps	8
8	17	(France) Jean-Pierre Jarier	Shadow-Ford	36	+ 4 Laps/Fuel pump	3
9	23	(West Germany) Rolf Stommelen	Lola-Ford	35	+ 5 Laps	5
10	51	(Netherlands) Roelof Wunderink	Ensign-Ford	35	+ 5 Laps	18
11	35	(United Kingdom) David Purley	Chevron-Ford	34	+ 6 Laps	12
Ret	31	(United Kingdom) Ian Ashley	Lola-Chevrolet	27	Accident	16
Ret	28	(United States) Mark Donohue	Penske-Ford	26	Handling	7
Ret	3	(South Africa) Jody Scheckter	Tyrrell-Ford	25	Engine	2
Ret	10	(Italy) Lella Lombardi	March-Ford	20	Handling	11
Ret	7	(Australia) Vern Schuppan	Lola-Chevrolet	18	Tyres	13
Ret	50	(New Zealand) John Nicholson	Lyncar-Ford	15	Engine	20
Ret	208	(Denmark) Tom Belsø	Lola-Chevrolet	0	Accident	9
Ret	2	(West Germany) Jochen Mass	McLaren-Ford	0	Accident	15
DSQ	52	(United Kingdom) Tony Trimmer	Safir-Ford	33	Outside assistance	14
DNS	21	(Italy) Maurizio Flammini	Williams-Ford	0	Accident during practice	21
DNQ	34	(Belgium) Teddy Pilette	Lola-Chevrolet			
DNQ	39	(United Kingdom) Brian Redman	Chevron-Chevrolet			
DNQ	33	(United Kingdom) Guy Edwards	Lola-Chevrolet			
DNQ	77	(Australia) Dave Walker	Chevron-Chevrolet			
DNQ	32	(United Kingdom) Peter Gethin	Lola-Chevrolet			

Previous race: 1974 BRDC International Trophy	Formula One non-championship races 1975 season	Next race: 1975 BRDC International Trophy
Previous race: 1974 Race of Champions	Race of Champions	Next race: 1976 Race of Champions
