= Grovewood Awards =

The Grovewood Awards (later becoming the Cellnet Awards and then the McLaren Autosport BRDC Awards) were a series of British motor racing awards presented each year in the United Kingdom to the year's up-and-coming British and Commonwealth racing drivers. The monetary award recipients were selected by an independent judging panel appointed by the UK's Guild of Motoring Writers. They were asked to select drivers, who in their opinion, demonstrated promise in the early part of their racing careers, with consideration of their cars and facilities taken into account. The panel had the authority to exclude drivers from selection for their on-track conduct.

== History ==
The awards were inaugurated in 1963 by John Webb of Grovewood Securities, with the intention of providing monetary assistance for promising young British and Commonwealth motor racing drivers. Grovewood, the owners of four racing circuits in the UK, wanted to recognise and foster young racing talent.

In 1971, the prize value was doubled and the scheme broadened to include two special commendations of £100, the recipients being eligible for a major prize the following year. In 1987 the awards were taken over by Cellnet and became known as the Cellnet Awards.

== Winners ==
Year	1st prize	1st prize winner	2nd prize	2nd prize winner	3rd prize	3rd prize winner	Ref
1963	£500	Richard Attwood	£300	Tony Hegbourne	£200	Brian Hart	
1964	£500	Roger Mac	£300	Boley Pittard	£200	Chris Irwin	
1965	£500	Piers Courage	£300	Tony Dean	£200	John Miles	
1966	£500	Chris Lambert	£300	Jackie Oliver	£200	Brian Redman	
1967	£500	Alan Rollinson	£300	Derek Bell	£200	Peter Gaydon	
1968	£500	Tim Schenken	£300	Chris Craft	£200	Roger Enever	
1969	£500	Mike Walker	£300	James Hunt	£200	Tony Trimmer	
1970	£500	Colin Vandervell	£300	Mike Beuttler	£200	Tim Goss	
1971	£1,000	Roger Williamson	£500	Vern Schuppan	£300	Ray Mallock	
1972	£1,000	Dave Walker	£500	John Watson	£300	Ian Taylor	
1973	£1,000	Tom Pryce	£500	Tony Brise	£300	Donald MacLeod	
1974	£1,000	Bob Evans	£500	Richard Morgan	£300	Alan Jones	
1975	£1,000	Brian Henton	£500	Geoff Lees	£300	Larry Perkins	
1976	£1,000	Tiff Needell	£500	Rupert Keegan	£300	Derek Warwick	
1977	£1,000	Bruce Allison	£500	Stephen South	£300	Philip Bullman	
1978	£1,000	Kenny Acheson	£500	Brett Riley	£300	Jeff Allam	
1979	£1,000	Mike Thackwell	£500	Nigel Mansell	£300	Terry Gray	
1980	£5,000	David Leslie	£2,500	Richard Trott	£1,500	Jonathan Palmer	
1981	£5,000	Dave Scott	£2,500	Tim Davies	£1,500	James Weaver	
1982	£5,000	Martin Brundle	£2,500	Julian Bailey	£1,500	Calvin Fish	
1983	£5,000	Andrew Gilbert-Scott	£2,500	Johnny Dumfries	£1,500	Steve Soper	
1984	£5,000	Mark Blundell	£2,500	Andy Wallace	£1,500	Will Hoy	
1985	£5,000	Russell Spence	£2,500	Bertrand Fabi	£1,500	Damon Hill	
1986	£5,000	Martin Donnelly	£2,500	Johnny Herbert	£1,500	Gary Brabham	
1987	£5,000	Derek Higgins	£2,500	Eddie Irvine	£1,500	Jason Elliott	
