= Schuppan 962CR =

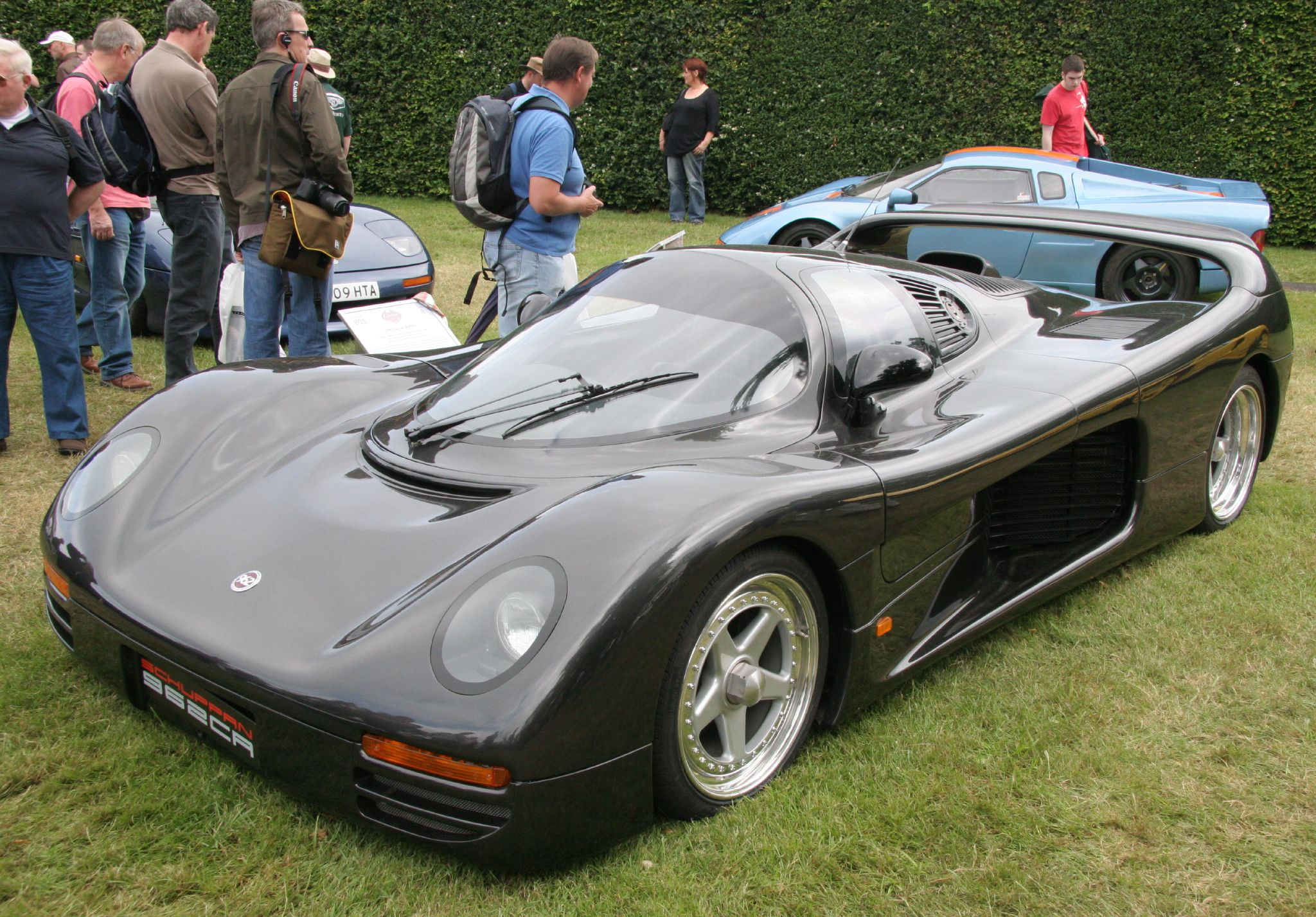

Overview
- Manufacturer: Vern Schuppan Ltd.
- Production: 1992–1994 (6 produced)
- Assembly: Modena Cars, High Wycombe, Buckinghamshire (final construction)
- Designer: Mike Simcoe

Body and chassis
- Class: Sports car (S)
- Body style: 2-door coupé
- Layout: RMR layout
- Platform: Carbon fibre Porsche 962-based chassis, constructed by Reynard Motorsport
- Related: Porsche 962; Dauer 962 Le Mans

Powertrain
- Engine: 3.3 L (3294 cc, 201.0 cu in) Twin-Turbocharged H6
- Transmission: 5-speed manual

Dimensions
- Wheelbase: 2794 mm (110.0 in)
- Length: 4280 mm (168.5 in)
- Width: 1999 mm (78.7 in)
- Height: 1074 mm (42.3 in)
- Curb weight: 1,050 kg (2,315 lb)

The Schuppan 962CR is a sports car built from 1992-1994 by Australian racecar driver Vern Schuppan. It was built as a tribute to Schuppan's 1983 24 Hours of Le Mans victory and 1983 All Japan Sports Prototype Championship title (Schuppan won both driving a Porsche 956).

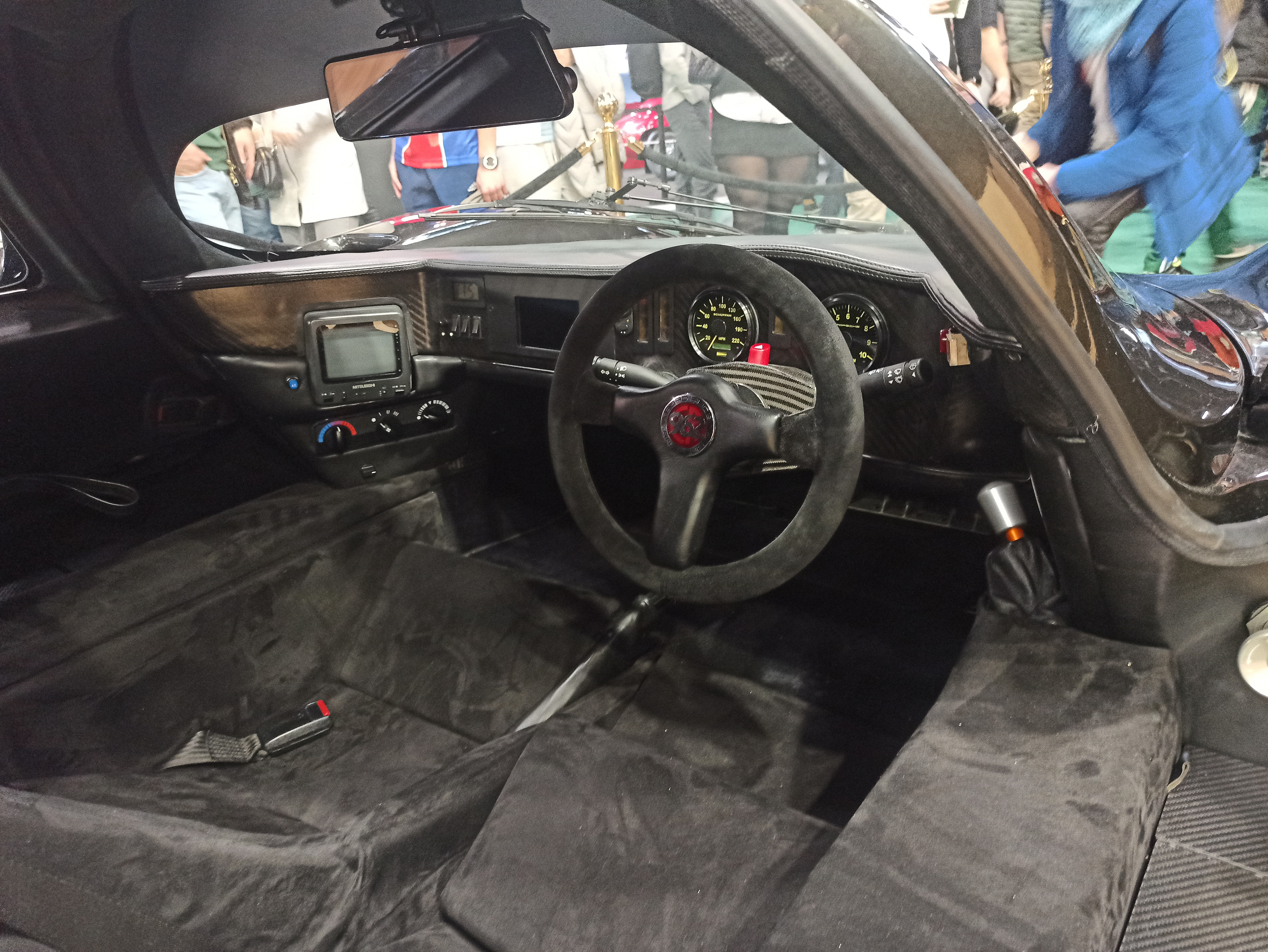
Interior

== Performance ==
The 962CR is a mid-engine, rear-wheel drive car that weighs 1,050 kg (2,315 lb). It is powered by a water-cooled 3.3-litre Type-935 Flat-6 with twin KKK turbochargers producing 600 hp (608 PS; 447 kW) (about 182 hp/L). Power goes to the rear wheels through a five-speed manual transmission. The engine was borrowed nearly directly from the standard Porsche 962 unit used in the North American IMSA GT Championship with a slight decrease in displacement. The car has a claimed top speed of 230 mph (370 km/h), and a 0–60 mph (0-97 km/h) acceleration time of 3.5 seconds. It has a carbon fiber monocoque chassis and uses titanium fasteners throughout.

== History ==
The 962CR is based on the dominant Le Mans-winning Porsche 962 race car which Schuppan raced and owned with his own team. The carbon monocoques were built entirely by Reynard Motorsport and the body by Schuppan, although it featured design elements from the 962 race car. Final assembly took place at the 60,000 ft² Vern Schuppan Ltd production facility in High Wycombe, Buckinghamshire, England. Funding was provided by Japanese investors who supported Schuppan's race team that competed in the All Japan Sports Prototype Championship. Failure of payment from Japan for two cars, coupled with the high cost of the car's construction and a worldwide economic recession, forced Schuppan to declare bankruptcy, folding his car company.

== Cost ==
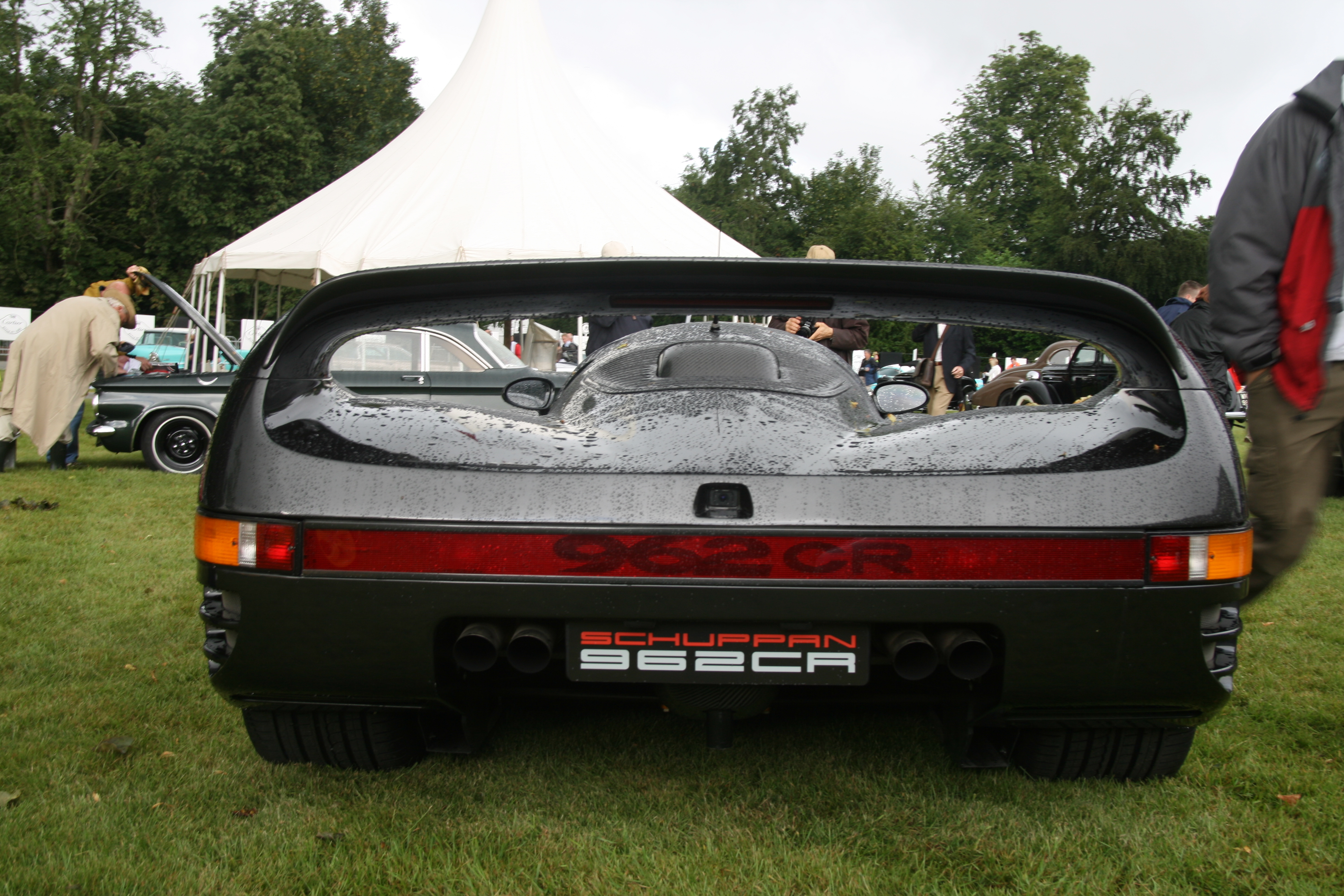
962CR rear end

Priced at over US$1.5 million in 1994, the Schuppan 962CR is among the most expensive vehicles ever sold new. Rumors circulated for several years that the 962CR was sold new for US$2.5 million, but this rumor was eventually dispelled by author and Porsche enthusiast Karl Ludvigsen who listed a price of ¥195 000 000 (Approximately US$1.9 million at the time).

== Production ==
Most sources say that six Schuppan 962CRs were built, with chassis #1 being a prototype chassis. In November 2014, chassis number 006 appeared at Daytona International Raceway on display during the Classic 24 hour race. The current owners confirmed that the car was never driven and had 0 miles on the odometer. The car had been owned by the company until it went bankrupt and it was given to one of the creditors as part of a deal to pay outstanding debt. The car was believed to be the only one in the United States. Even though six were built, there are only four remaining in existence due to one being destroyed in a fire.

== Works cited ==
- Lawrence, Mike (1997). "Chassis Production and Racing History" (PDF). Motor Racing Archive. Archived from the original (PDF) on September 2, 2003.
