= 1974 German Grand Prix =

Race details
- Date: 4 August 1974
- Official name: XXXVI Großer Preis von Deutschland
- Location: Nürburgring, Nürburg, West Germany
- Course: Permanent racing facility
- Course length: 22.835 km (14.189 miles)
- Distance: 14 laps, 319.690 km (198.646 miles)
- Weather: Overcast, showers

Pole position
Driver	(Austria) Niki Lauda	Ferrari
- Time: 7:00.80

Fastest lap
Driver	(South Africa) Jody Scheckter	Tyrrell-Ford
- Time: 7:11.10 on lap 11

Podium
First	(Switzerland) Clay Regazzoni	Ferrari
Second	(South Africa) Jody Scheckter	Tyrrell-Ford
Third	(Argentina) Carlos Reutemann	Brabham-Ford

The 1974 German Grand Prix was a Formula One motor race held at the Nürburgring on 4 August 1974. It was race 11 of 15 in both the 1974 World Championship of Drivers and the 1974 International Cup for Formula One Manufacturers. It was the 36th German Grand Prix and the 33rd to be held at the Nürburgring complex of circuits. The race was won by Swiss driver Clay Regazzoni driving a Ferrari 312B3. Regazzoni led every lap on the way to his second Grand Prix victory, some four years after his debut victory at the 1970 Italian Grand Prix. South African driver Jody Scheckter was second driving a Tyrrell 007 ahead of Argentine driver Carlos Reutemann (Brabham BT44).

Since the 1973 event the main straight had been widened and resurfaced. In response to new FIA regulations stating that all FIA-mandated races must have safety walls, the organizers replaced the bushes lining the straight with Armco and placed sandy surface where grass could grow on both sides of the straight. Regazzoni's win, coupled with Niki Lauda's first lap crash, put the Swiss Ferrari driver back into the lead of the championship he had previous held earlier in the year. Lauda crashed his Ferrari 312B3 attempting to pass Scheckter. Emerson Fittipaldi also was an early retirement after making a very slow start in his McLaren M23 and was struck by his teammate Denny Hulme putting out both cars within a lap. Hulme attempted to restart the race in a spare car and was disqualified for doing so. Mike Hailwood was another to crash, having a large accident on the second last lap at Pflanzgarten in his McLaren M23. The former motorcyclist received a badly broken leg in the accident which became a career-ending injury. Occasional showers fell during the race, contributing to the accident toll which also claimed Patrick Depailler (Tyrrell 007), Jacques Laffite (Williams FW02) and John Watson (Brabham BT44). Just 14 cars finished the race, although Hailwood would also be classified as a finisher, out of the 26 starters. There was six cars who failed to qualify including Chris Amon (Amon AF101) who pulled out due to illness.

Howden Ganley also suffered a serious accident during Friday's practice. The rear suspension failed on the Maki at Hatzenbach and he swerved right into the Armco barrier, ripping off the nose section of the car. Ganley's legs were dangling out the front of the car. He got out by himself but he collapsed when he got to the fence, his ankles seriously injured. This led to Ganley's retirement from Formula 1.

Regazzoni moved into a three-point lead in the championship over Scheckter. Former points leader Lauda dropped to third, six points behind his Ferrari teammate and just one ahead of Fittipaldi. Ferrari moved eight points clear of McLaren in the constructor's standings.

== Classification ==
=== Qualifying ===
Pos	No	Driver	Constructor	Time	Gap
1	12	(Austria) Niki Lauda	Ferrari	7:00.80	—
2	11	(Switzerland) Clay Regazzoni	Ferrari	7:01.10	+0.30
3	5	(Brazil) Emerson Fittipaldi	McLaren-Ford	7:02.30	+1.50
4	3	(South Africa) Jody Scheckter	Tyrrell-Ford	7:03.40	+2.60
5	4	(France) Patrick Depailler	Tyrrell-Ford	7:06.20	+5.40
6	7	(Argentina) Carlos Reutemann	Brabham-Ford	7:07.20	+6.40
7	6	(New Zealand) Denny Hulme	McLaren-Ford	7:08.80	+8.00
8	1	(Sweden) Ronnie Peterson	Lotus-Ford	7:09.00	+8.20
9	2	(Belgium) Jacky Ickx	Lotus-Ford	7:09.10	+8.30
10	19	(West Germany) Jochen Mass	Surtees-Ford	7:09.80	+9.00
11	16	(United Kingdom) Tom Pryce	Shadow-Ford	7:09.90	+9.10
12	33	(United Kingdom) Mike Hailwood	McLaren-Ford	7:10.10	+9.30
13	24	(United Kingdom) James Hunt	Hesketh-Ford	7:10.40	+9.60
14	28	(United Kingdom) John Watson	Brabham-Ford	7:10.51	+9.71
15	14	(France) Jean-Pierre Beltoise	BRM	7:10.53	+9.73
16	20	(Italy) Arturo Merzario	Iso-Marlboro-Ford	7:11.20	+10.40
17	8	(Brazil) Carlos Pace	Brabham-Ford	7:12.70	+11.90
18	17	(France) Jean-Pierre Jarier	Shadow-Ford	7:14.90	+14.10
19	26	(United Kingdom) Graham Hill	Lola-Ford	7:15.50	+14.70
20	9	(West Germany) Hans-Joachim Stuck	March-Ford	7:16.00	+15.20
21	21	(France) Jacques Laffite	Iso-Marlboro-Ford	7:17.60	+16.80
22	22	(Australia) Vern Schuppan	Ensign-Ford	7:20.81	+20.01
23	10	(Italy) Vittorio Brambilla	March-Ford	7:20.88	+20.08
24	15	(France) Henri Pescarolo	BRM	7:20.90	+20.10
25	18	(United Kingdom) Derek Bell	Surtees-Ford	7:22.00	+21.20
26	32	(United Kingdom) Ian Ashley	Token-Ford	7:24.60	+23.80
27	37	(France) François Migault	BRM	7:26.30	+25.50
28	23	(Australia) Tim Schenken	Trojan-Ford	7:29.10	+28.30
29	27	(United Kingdom) Guy Edwards	Lola-Ford	7:31.50	+30.70
30	30	(Australia) Larry Perkins	Amon-Ford	7:36.20	+35.40
31	30	(New Zealand) Chris Amon	Amon-Ford	8:26.20	+1:25.40
32	25	(New Zealand) Howden Ganley	Maki-Ford	—	—

*Positions with a pink background indicate drivers that failed to qualify. Ashley failed to qualify, but started at the back of the grid.

=== Race ===
Pos	No	Driver	Constructor	Laps	Time/Retired	Grid	Points
1	11	(Switzerland) Clay Regazzoni	Ferrari	14	1:41:35.0	2	9
2	3	(South Africa) Jody Scheckter	Tyrrell-Ford	14	+ 50.7	4	6
3	7	(Argentina) Carlos Reutemann	Brabham-Ford	14	+ 1:23.3	6	4
4	1	(Sweden) Ronnie Peterson	Lotus-Ford	14	+ 1:24.2	8	3
5	2	(Belgium) Jacky Ickx	Lotus-Ford	14	+ 1:25.0	9	2
6	16	(United Kingdom) Tom Pryce	Shadow-Ford	14	+ 2:18.1	11	1
7	9	(West Germany) Hans Joachim Stuck	March-Ford	14	+ 2:58.7	20	
8	17	(France) Jean-Pierre Jarier	Shadow-Ford	14	+ 3:25.9	18	
9	26	(United Kingdom) Graham Hill	Lola-Ford	14	+ 3:26.4	19	
10	15	(France) Henri Pescarolo	BRM	14	+ 4:17.7	24	
11	18	(United Kingdom) Derek Bell	Surtees-Ford	14	+ 5:17.7	25	
12	8	(Brazil) Carlos Pace	Brabham-Ford	14	+ 6:26.3	17	
13	10	(Italy) Vittorio Brambilla	March-Ford	14	+ 8:43.1	23	
14	32	(United Kingdom) Ian Ashley	Token-Ford	13	+ 1 Lap	26	
15	33	(United Kingdom) Mike Hailwood	McLaren-Ford	12	Accident	12	
Ret	19	(West Germany) Jochen Mass	Surtees-Ford	10	Engine	10	
Ret	24	(United Kingdom) James Hunt	Hesketh-Ford	10	Gearbox	13	
Ret	4	(France) Patrick Depailler	Tyrrell-Ford	5	Accident	5	
Ret	20	(Italy) Arturo Merzario	Iso-Marlboro-Ford	5	Throttle	16	
Ret	14	(France) Jean-Pierre Beltoise	BRM	4	Fuel system	15	
Ret	22	(Australia) Vern Schuppan	Ensign-Ford	4	Gearbox	22	
Ret	5	(Brazil) Emerson Fittipaldi	McLaren-Ford	2	Suspension	3	
Ret	21	(France) Jacques Laffite	Iso-Marlboro-Ford	2	Suspension	21	
Ret	28	(United Kingdom) John Watson	Brabham-Ford	1	Suspension	14	
Ret	12	(Austria) Niki Lauda	Ferrari	0	Accident	1	
DSQ	6	(New Zealand) Denny Hulme	McLaren-Ford	0	Illegal car change	7	
DNQ	37	(France) François Migault	BRM				
DNQ	23	(Australia) Tim Schenken	Trojan-Ford				
DNQ	27	(United Kingdom) Guy Edwards	Lola-Ford				
DNQ	30	(Australia) Larry Perkins	Amon-Ford				
DNQ	30	(New Zealand) Chris Amon	Amon-Ford				
DNQ	25	(New Zealand) Howden Ganley	Maki-Ford		Practice Accident		

== Notes ==
- This was the Formula One World Championship debut for Australian driver Larry Perkins, British driver Ian Ashley and French driver and future Grand Prix winner Jacques Laffite.
- This was the 10th Grand Prix start for British constructor Ensign.
- This was also the 68th pole position for a Ferrari. It broke the previous record set by Lotus at the 1974 Argentine Grand Prix, earlier that year.

== Championship standings after the race ==
Drivers' Championship standings

	Pos	Driver	Points
3	1	(Switzerland) **Clay Regazzoni***	44
1	2	(South Africa) **Jody Scheckter***	41
2	3	(Austria) **Niki Lauda***	38
2	4	(Brazil) **Emerson Fittipaldi***	37
	5	(Sweden) **Ronnie Peterson***	22

Constructors' Championship standings

	Pos	Constructor	Points
1	1	(Italy) **Ferrari***	57
2	2	(United Kingdom) **McLaren-Ford***	49 (51)
	3	(United Kingdom) **Tyrrell-Ford***	45
	4	(United Kingdom) **Lotus-Ford***	29
	5	(United Kingdom) Brabham-Ford	15

- Note: Only the top five positions are included for both sets of standings. Only the best 7 results from the first 8 races and the best 6 results from the last 7 races counted towards the Championship. Numbers without parentheses are Championship points; numbers in parentheses are total points scored.
- Competitors in bold and marked with an asterisk still had a theoretical chance of becoming World Champion.

Previous race: 1974 British Grand Prix	FIA Formula One World Championship; 1974 season	Next race: 1974 Austrian Grand Prix
Previous race: 1973 German Grand Prix	German Grand Prix	Next race: 1975 German Grand Prix
Previous race: 1973 Belgian Grand Prix	European Grand Prix (Designated European Grand Prix)	Next race: 1975 Austrian Grand Prix
