= Tom Pryce =

British racing driver (1949–1977)

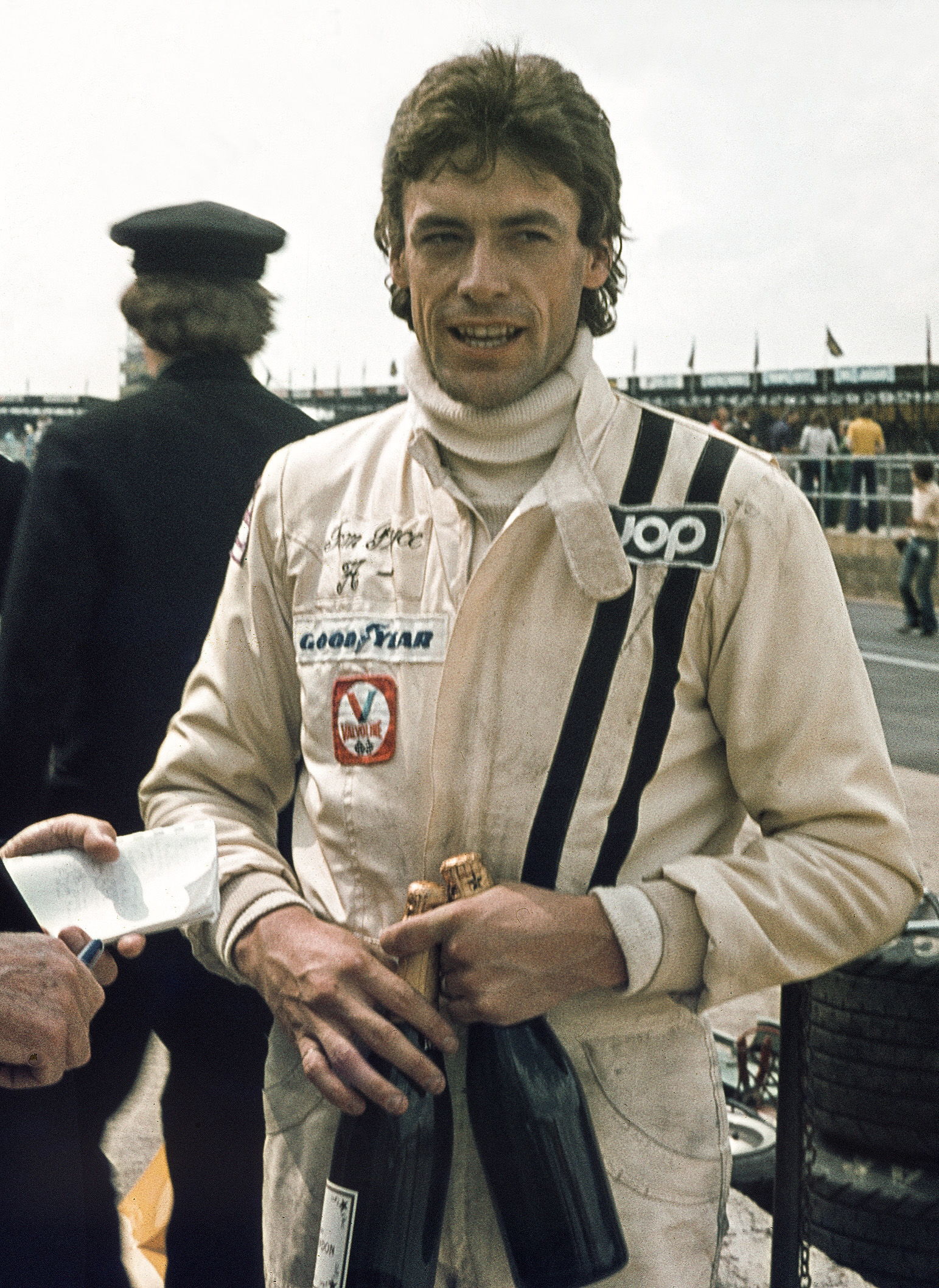
- Pryce at the 1975 Race of Champions
- Born: Thomas Maldwyn Pryce; 11 June 1949; Ruthin, Denbighshire, Wales
- Died: 5 March 1977 (aged 27); Midrand, Transvaal, Republic of South Africa
- Cause of death: Injuries sustained at the 1977 South African Grand Prix
- Spouse: Fenella Warwick-Smith (m. 1975)

Formula One World Championship career
- Nationality: (United Kingdom) British
- Active years: 1974–1977
- Team(s): Token, Shadow
- Entries: 42 (42 starts)
- Championships: 0
- Wins: 0
- Podiums: 2
- Career points: 19
- Pole positions: 1
- Fastest laps: 0
- First entry: 1974 Belgian Grand Prix
- Last entry: 1977 South African Grand Prix

Thomas Maldwyn Pryce (11 June 1949 – 5 March 1977) was a British racing driver from Wales, who competed in Formula One from 1974 to 1977.

Pryce started his career in Formula One with the small Token team, making his only start for them at the 1974 Belgian Grand Prix. Shortly after winning the Formula Three support race for the 1974 Monaco Grand Prix, Pryce joined the Shadow team and scored his first points in Germany in only his fourth race. He later claimed two podium finishes, his first in Austria in 1975 and the second in Brazil a year later. He won the non-championship Race of Champions in 1975, becoming the first—and to this date, only—Welsh driver to win a Formula One race; he also became the first Welsh driver to lead a Grand Prix, as well as the first to achieve a pole position, at the 1975 British Grand Prix. Pryce was noted for his ability in wet-weather conditions.

Pryce set the fastest lap during the rain-affected practice sessions for the 1977 South African Grand Prix. During the Grand Prix, he collided at high speed with a safety marshal, Frederik Jansen van Vuuren, and both men were killed. A memorial to Pryce was unveiled in 2009 in his home town of Ruthin.

== Personal and early life ==
Pryce was born on 11 June 1949 in Ruthin, Denbighshire, Wales, to Jack and Gwyneth Pryce (née Hughes). Jack had served in the Royal Air Force as a tail-gunner on a Lancaster bomber before joining the local police force. Gwyneth was a district nurse. Pryce's older brother, David, died at the age of three leaving Tom an only child for much of the time he was growing up, although his parents did foster a young girl called Sandra for a while. Pryce, known to his friends as Mald, attended Nantglyn Primary School, Denbighshire. The family later moved to Towyn, Denbighshire, due to Jack's job.

Pryce took an interest in cars while driving a baker's van at the age of ten, before informing his parents that he wanted to be a racing driver. During an interview with Alan Henry in 1975, he stated that he had wanted to become a pilot, but thought he was not intelligent enough. Like many future Formula One drivers, Pryce had a childhood racing hero. In his case, it was Lotus's Scottish driver Jim Clark. Pryce's mother recalled that he was very upset when Clark died at the Hockenheimring in April 1968. His father noted that "he was very upset when Jochen Rindt was killed, too". After he left school at 16, Pryce's mother insisted that he take an apprenticeship as a tractor mechanic at Llandrillo Technical College, giving him "something to fall back on", as she put it, if his career as a racing driver was unsuccessful.

In 1975, Pryce married Fenella "Nella" Warwick-Smith, whom he met at a disco in Otford, Kent in 1973. Following the death of her husband, Nella went on to run an antiques store in Fulham, London with Janet Brise, the widow of Tony Brise, who died in a plane crash in 1975 with fellow racing driver, Graham Hill and later moved to France.

== Helmet design ==
Pryce's helmet design was, in comparison to later drivers', simple and restrained. His helmet was plain white all over until 1970. At that year's race at Castle Combe, his father asked Pryce to make his helmet stand out more so that he could easily identify him in a pack of cars. Pryce added five black vertical lines to his helmet, placed just above his visor. From that time, the only change to this design was the addition of a Welsh flag to the side of his helmet in 1974.

== Career ==
=== Pre–Formula One ===
==== 1969–1971: Early years ====
Pryce's first steps into motor racing came at the Mallory Park circuit in Leicestershire when he was 20. Pryce was put through his paces by Trevor Taylor, an ex-Team Lotus driver and old teammate of Pryce's childhood hero Clark. He later became a star in the Formula 5000 series. From there, Pryce went on to compete in the Daily Express Crusader Championship, a series run by Motor Racing Stables for racing school pupils using Lotus 51 Formula Ford cars. Races alternated between the Brands Hatch and Silverstone circuits; Pryce made his début at the former. "The races were £35 a time. But I sold my Mini and my parents offered all the help and encouragement I could wish for" Pryce recalled to Alan Henry.

The prize for the overall winner of the series was a Formula Ford Lola T200 worth £1,500. The series was decided at the last round, held at Silverstone, the day before the 1970 Formula One International Trophy. Pryce qualified on the third row for the race, which was held in rain. Jack Pryce remembered that his son was rubbing his hands in delight: "he always loved racing in the rain". The early part of the race was led by a driver called Chris Smith but then heavy rain started and Pryce was able to catch up with Smith and overtake him before winning by a comfortable margin. He was given his Lola by Sir Max Aitken.

Pryce took his new car to Brands Hatch, where he was allowed to house it in one of the old stables at the bottom of the paddock. Pryce soon abandoned his farming career and moved to a guest house in West Kingsdown, near the Brands Hatch circuit. Pryce continued to make a name for himself during 1971, entering a new twin-seater Sportscar category called Formula F100, which he won with what was described by motorsports author David Tremayne as "embarrassing ease". He then moved up to Formula Super Vee, driving the then-choice Royale RP9, for Team Rumsey Investments, and soon made his Formula Three début for the same manufacturer at Brands Hatch.

==== 1972–1973: Lower formulae ====
"I was fiddling about with the car when I suddenly saw Peter Lamplough coming straight towards me. I just couldn't believe it – I froze on the spot. The next thing I remember is being picked out of a shop window, where my car had been hurled by the impact"

— Tom Pryce

In that race at Brands Hatch, Pryce took an unfancied Royale RP11 to first place in the Formula Three support race for the 1972 Formula One Race of Champions against many established Formula Three drivers such as Roger Williamson, Jochen Mass and James Hunt. So large was Pryce's advantage at the end of the race, many of the other teams voiced an opinion that Pryce's car had run the race underweight; it turned out that the circuit's weighbridge certificate had expired and everyone's cars had been underweight. Pryce retired from the leading group in the following two rounds at Oulton Park and Zandvoort, and then during practice for the support race of the 1972 Monaco Grand Prix his car came to a stop at Casino Square after a wire had come loose. He had exited his car to correct the problem when Peter Lamplough lost control of his car and struck the Royale RP11. Pryce was knocked into a shop window and broke a leg.

Pryce was back in action two weeks after his incident in Monaco. Pryce also ran in the Formula SuperVee series, winning the series by a comfortable margin, "I won just about every race I went in for" Pryce recalled. A run with Royale's Formula Atlantic works team was also in store for Pryce during 1972, where he took pole position for the final three rounds of the championship and won the final round at Brands Hatch.

Pryce continued racing in Formula Atlantic in 1973, winning three races. Royale soon had plans to enter Formula Two, such was the Welshman's talent. The ambition to run in the Formula Two championship was planned to be financially fuelled by a Liechtenstein driver, Manfred Schurti. These plans only resulted in one of Royale's F2 cars being built before the project was scrapped and Bob King, the head of Royale, left the company.

Following an invitation to test one of his cars, Pryce found himself racing in the Formula Two series with Ron Dennis's Rondel Racing outfit. His best result for the team came at the Norisring where he was leading the race until a brake failure meant he had to give up first place to teammate Tim Schenken. At the end of 1973, Pryce won the Grovewood Award for his efforts during the year. Jack Pryce recalled that his son did not want to win the award, as he thought it was "a jinx on a driver's career".

=== Formula One ===
==== 1974: Token ====
At the age of 25, Pryce graduated to Formula One, the highest category of circuit racing defined by the Fédération Internationale de l'Automobile (FIA), motorsport's world governing body, joining the newly formed Token Racing team. The team was created by Tony Vlassopulos and Ken Grob after the original Token team closed down in 1973 due to a lack of financial backing which had led to the end of the previous Rondel Racing outfit. Pryce was given the seat thanks to his backing from Titan Properties, and what David Tremayne described as "evident promise". Pryce made his début for the team at the BRDC International Trophy, a non-championship Formula One event held at Silverstone, but lack of an airbox and an engine cover, along with his shortage of experience in the car, made him the slowest driver of the 16 competitors during qualifying: 26 seconds slower than James Hunt's Hesketh in pole position. The Welshman retired 15 laps into the race with a gear linkage problem. Pryce's World Championship début came at the 1974 Belgian Grand Prix, where he qualified in 20th place, three seconds slower than the fastest time set by Clay Regazzoni. Once again, he failed to finish, completing 66 laps before retiring after a collision with Jody Scheckter's Tyrrell.

Pryce was refused entry to the 1974 Monaco Formula One Grand Prix, as he was deemed "inexperienced". Tony Vlassopulos decided to prove a point and replaced normal Formula 3 driver Buzz Buzaglo, with Pryce for the supporting Formula Three race, driving for Ippokampos Racing, in a March 743, which he won by 20.8 seconds.

==== 1974–1977: Shadow ====
===== 1974 =====
"I think that people who are involved in motor racing and have achieved something, have an ability to spot talent. It was abundantly clear that Tom's ability was above and beyond most of his contemporaries."

— John Watson

Following his drive in Monaco, and a short spell in Formula Two, Pryce was signed by Shadow as replacement for Brian Redman, who had in turn replaced the late Peter Revson. Pryce made his début for the team in Holland. He qualified in 11th position, less than 0.4 seconds slower than his teammate, Jean-Pierre Jarier, who was in his second full season of Formula One competition. Pryce retired on the first lap of the race after a collision with James Hunt at the first corner broke his Shadow DN3's rear suspension. Pryce qualified third in his second Grand Prix for the team, in France, 0.32 seconds slower than Niki Lauda's pole position time but nearly half a second quicker than Jarier. Once again, Pryce's race ended at the first corner, when minor contact with Carlos Reutemann's Brabham deflected Pryce's Shadow into the path of James Hunt. The second collision between the two British drivers in as many races eliminated them both. Later in the season, Pryce received 100 bottles of champagne for finishing fastest in the practice session for the British Grand Prix at Brands Hatch. He went on to qualify on the fourth row of the starting grid.

Pryce scored the first point of his career in Germany, at the most challenging circuit on the F1 calendar at the time, the 14.2 mile Nürburgring circuit. After finishing 6th from 11th on the grid, he then qualified in 16th for the next Grand Prix in Austria, but spun off on lap 22, ending his race. He qualified in 22nd place in Italy, and finished 12 places higher. His season ended with an engine failure in Canada, and the Shadow severely off the pace at Watkins Glen in the United States. At the end of the season Pryce was equal 18th in the Drivers' Championship with veteran Graham Hill and Vittorio Brambilla.

===== 1975 =====
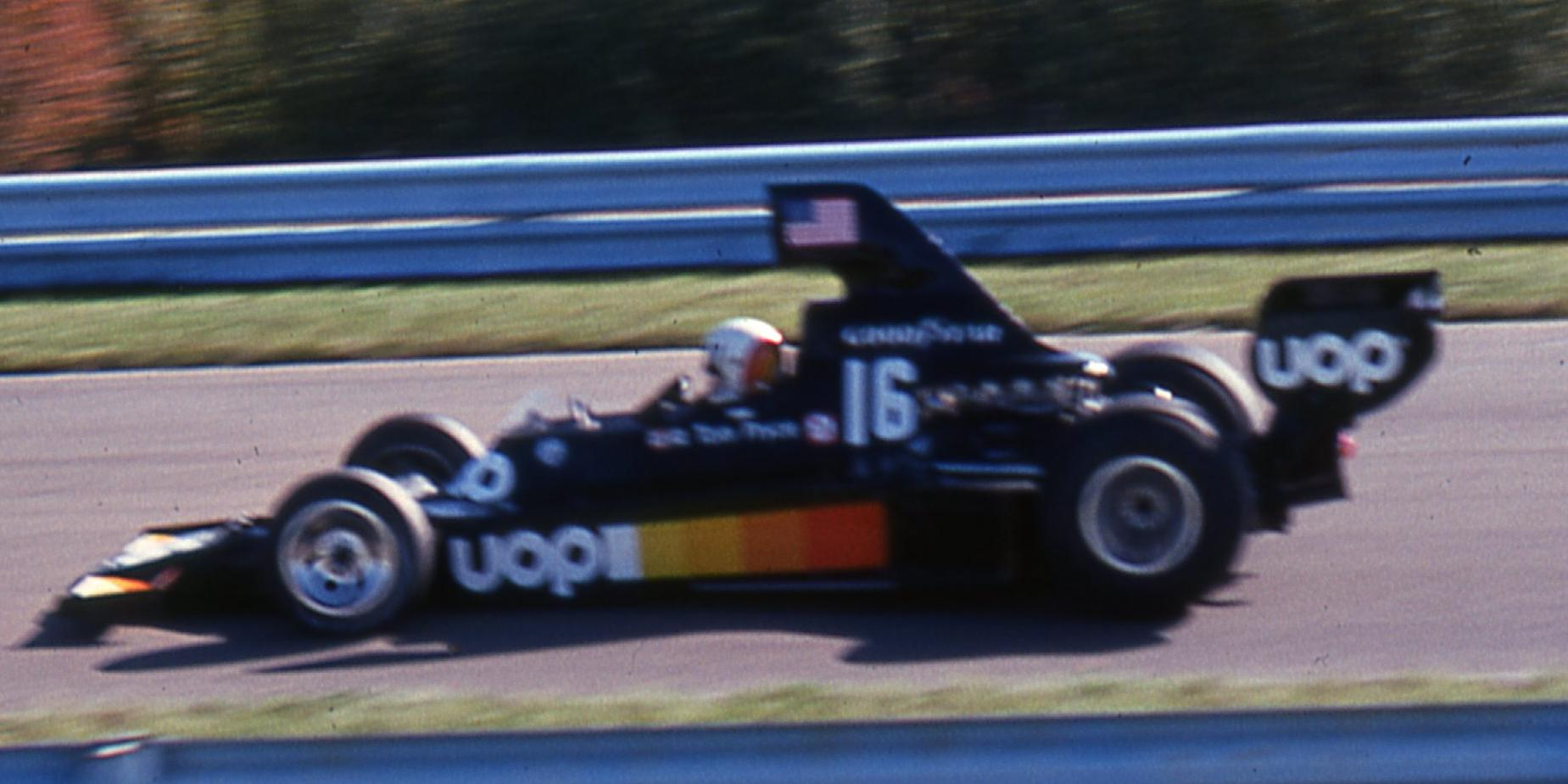
Pryce drives his Shadow at the 1975 US Grand Prix at Watkins Glen

At the start of the 1975 season, Pryce's future was subject to much speculation. Rumour linked him with a drive at Lotus, the team run by Colin Chapman, who had been keeping an eye on Pryce's progress throughout 1973 and 1974. At the time, Lotus was experiencing financial difficulties and reports suggested that Shadow and Lotus would swap Pryce and Swede Ronnie Peterson. The trade was viewed as a good acquisition for both teams, as Pryce was considered a driver of the same ability as Peterson, but would cost Lotus less, while Peterson could attract sponsorship to the relatively new Shadow team. The deal never materialised, although Shadow team manager Alan Rees claims that it came very close to being completed.

Pryce's Shadow teammate, Jean-Pierre Jarier, out-qualified him in the early part of the 1975 season, as the French driver had the new Shadow DN5 car, while Pryce was in the older DN3. It was not until the third round, the South African Grand Prix, that Pryce was able to use a DN5. The team's fourth race of the season was the non-championship Race of Champions held at Brands Hatch. Pryce qualified on pole position and, following a poor start, passed Peterson and Jacky Ickx before closing an eight-second gap to race leader Jody Scheckter, whose engine failed while Pryce harried him, letting Pryce through to become the first Welshman to win a Formula One race. Pryce showed other signs of promise during the season, most notably in Monaco and Silverstone where he qualified on the front row of the grid, the latter being in pole position. Pryce also achieved his first World Championship podium finish, in extremely wet conditions at the Austrian Grand Prix and finished in the points four more times. The highest of those came in Germany where he finished fourth, despite the fact that while he was running second behind Carlos Reutemann fuel had been leaking into the cockpit of his DN5 during the final laps around the Nürburgring, reportedly "searing his skin and almost blinding him with fumes". The Welshman later received the Prix Rouge et Blanc Jo Siffert award, named after the Swiss Formula One driver, for this achievement.

At the end of December 1975, Pryce and Dave Richards, future head of the Prodrive motorsports engineering company, entered a Lancia Stratos in the Tour of Epynt, a rally event contested by many established rallying names. Pryce needed little persuasion to team up for the one-off event on home soil with Richards, both of whom were from Ruthin. Pryce crashed into a bridge 10 miles (16 km) into the first stage, but still competed in the afternoon stages after his car was rebuilt.

===== 1976 =====
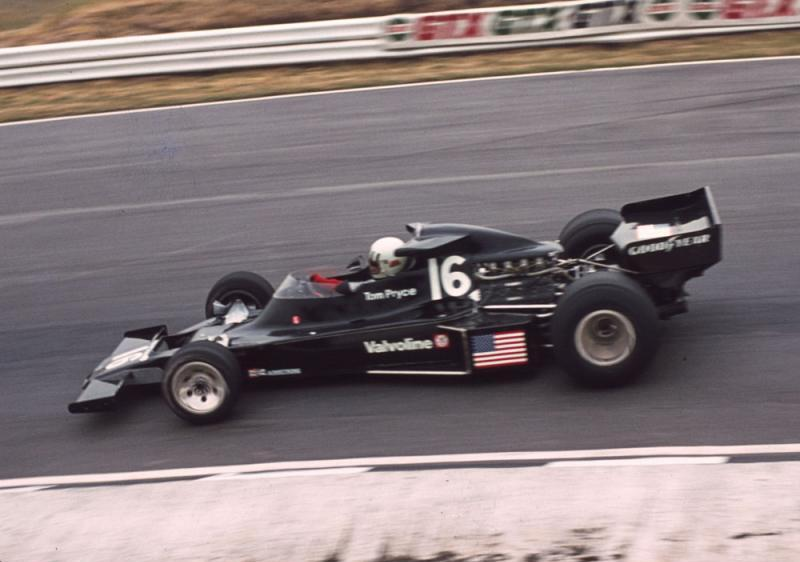
Pryce driving a 1976-specification Shadow DN5 at Brands Hatch

Once the 1976 Formula One World Championship season got under way Pryce instantly added a second podium finish to his tally, at the first round in Brazil. This came at the expense of continuing teammate Jarier, who was caught out by oil on the track from James Hunt's McLaren. Both Shadows enjoyed reasonable competitiveness during the next two races at Kyalami and Long Beach. Changes in car regulations, meaning that teams had to lower their airboxes and mount the cars' rear wings further forward, along with revised Goodyear tyres, meant the Shadow DN5B lost much of its competitiveness; Pryce still achieved a second points scoring finish of the season in Britain. The new Shadow DN8 was not introduced until the twelfth round at Zandvoort, where Pryce qualified the new car in third, and finished the race only one place lower in fourth: it was the last points scoring finish of his career. The Welshman finished his last full season 12th in the Drivers' Championship with 10 points, 59 points behind World Champion James Hunt.

===== 1977 =====
Rumors that Pryce would run as Mario Andretti's teammate for the Lotus team in 1978 were strong, as it coincided with the end of his contract with Shadow. A Lotus mechanic of the era even claimed many years later that the signing of Tom Pryce for the team would have become a reality if he had not died, as Peterson was hired at the last minute after an express offer from Chapman for a succulent amount of money in exchange for being Mario Andretti's number two in replacement of Gunnar Nilsson, who was going to go to the Arrows team in 1978 to team up with Riccardo Patrese. This latter fact was confirmed by Patrese in Motorsport magazine in an interview by Simon Taylor in 2010.

Jarier left Shadow before the start of the 1977 Formula One season, for ATS, and was replaced by Italian Renzo Zorzi, who was later rated by Jackie Oliver, part of the managerial team at Shadow, as "the worst driver we [the Shadow team] ever had". The new signing brought in sponsorship from Italy, easing Shadow's financial position. Pryce started the first race of the year in Argentina in ninth place and stayed with the leading group until a gear linkage failure on the 45th lap of the 52 lap race. Following a long pit stop to fix the fault, he was not classified. Pryce qualified 12th for the second round in Brazil, but on lap 34 retired from the race, while running in second place, as the result of an engine failure.

==== Legacy ====
In 2016, in an academic paper that reported a mathematical modelling study that assessed the relative influence of driver and machine, Pryce was ranked the 28th best Formula One driver of all time.

== Death ==
Pryce began his final race weekend, the 1977 South African Grand Prix at Kyalami, by setting the fastest time in the Wednesday practice session, held in wet weather. Pryce posted a time of 1:31.57, with the eventual 1977 champion Niki Lauda one second slower. The weather dried up prior to the Thursday session, and he slipped back down the grid to fifteenth place, almost two seconds slower than James Hunt's pole position time.

Pryce made a poor start to the Grand Prix in his DN8 and by the end of the first lap was in last place. Pryce started to climb back up the field during the next couple of laps, overtaking Brett Lunger and teammate Renzo Zorzi on lap two, and Alex Ribeiro and Boy Hayje the following lap. By lap 18 Pryce had moved from 22nd to 13th place.

The pit straight after The Kink is where Pryce collided with Jansen van Vuuren, and Crowthorne Corner is where Pryce's and Jacques Laffite's cars collided, with Pryce already dead.

On lap 22, Zorzi pulled off to the left side of the main straight, just after the brow of a hill and a bridge over the track. He was having problems with his fuel metering unit, and fuel was pumping directly onto the engine, which then caught fire. Zorzi did not immediately get out of his car as he could not disconnect the oxygen pipe from his helmet. (Note: Oxygen pipes were used to prevent drivers being suffocated if they were trapped in the car in a fire.)

The situation caused two marshals from the pit wall on the opposite side of the track to intervene. The first marshal to cross the track was a 25-year-old panel beater named Bill, and the second was 19-year-old Frederik "Frikkie" Jansen van Vuuren, who was carrying a 40-pound (18 kg) fire extinguisher. George Witt, the chief pit marshal for the race, said that the policy of the circuit was that in cases of fire, two marshals must attend and a further two act as back-up in case the first pair's extinguishers were not effective enough. Witt also recalled that both marshals crossed the track without prior permission. The former narrowly made it across the track, but the latter did not. As the two men started to run across the track, the cars driven by Hans-Joachim Stuck and Pryce came over the brow of a rise in the track.

"As we got to the top I suddenly sensed this marshal running across the track from my right, carrying an extinguisher. I took a big chance and I don't know how I got away with it. There was no time, I just reacted on pure instinct."

— Hans-Joachim Stuck

Pryce was directly behind Stuck's car along the main straight. Stuck saw Jansen van Vuuren and moved to the right to avoid both marshals, missing Bill by what Tremayne calls "millimetres". From his position Pryce could not see Jansen van Vuuren and was unable to react as quickly as Stuck had done. He struck the teenage marshal at approximately 270 km/h (170 mph). Jansen van Vuuren was thrown into the air and landed a few yards in front of Zorzi's car. Badly mutilated by Pryce's car, he died instantly. The fire extinguisher he had been carrying smashed into Pryce's head, before striking the Shadow's roll hoop. The force of the impact was such that the extinguisher was thrown up and over the adjacent grandstand. It landed in the car park to the rear of the stand, where it hit a parked car and jammed its door shut.

The impact with the fire extinguisher wrenched Pryce's helmet upward sharply, killing him instantly. Pryce's Shadow DN8, now with its driver dead at the wheel, continued at speed down the main straight towards the first corner, called Crowthorne. The car left the track to the right, scraping the metal barriers, hitting an entrance for emergency vehicles, and veering back onto the track. It then hit Jacques Laffite's Ligier, sending both Pryce and Laffite head-on into the barriers. Jansen van Vuuren's injuries were so extensive that, initially, his body was identified only after the race director had summoned all of the race marshals and he was not among them.

The eventual race winner was Austrian Niki Lauda, his first win since his near-fatal accident during the 1976 German Grand Prix. At first he announced it was the greatest victory of his career, but when told on the victory podium of Pryce's death, he said that "there was no joy after that".

=== Aftermath ===
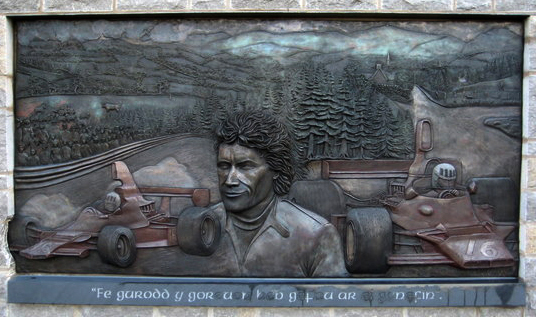
Memorial

Pryce's death was met with great grief from all those who knew him, especially his wife Nella, his parents Jack and Gwyneth and the Shadow team. His body was buried at St Bartholomew's Church in Otford, near Sevenoaks, Kent, the same church where he and Nella were married two years earlier.

Pryce's performances in a Formula One car earned him much respect amongst the F1 paddock. David Tremayne named his son after the Welshman. The Tom Pryce Award, also known as the Tom Pryce Trophy, was instigated, and is given annually to Welsh personalities who have made an outstanding contribution to motoring or transport.

During its re-design, the Anglesey Circuit in North Wales named the Tom Pryce Straight after a request from Ruthin Town Council. Eddie Knipe, a South African living in Sevenoaks, sought permission from Nella Pryce to approach the Ruthin Town Council to commemorate her late husband. Having gained her consent and that of Tom's parents, a trust was established in 2006 under the chairmanship of David Richards to create a memorial to Tom Pryce in Ruthin. Neil Dalrymple, a local artist, was commissioned by Ruthin Town Council in 2008 to design an 8-by-4-foot (2.4 by 1.2 m) plaque and in February 2009, an auction of Formula One pit passes to fund its manufacture was announced. The memorial was unveiled on 11 June 2009, on what would have been Pryce's 60th birthday.

== Complete Formula One World Championship results ==
(key) (Races in bold indicate pole position; small number denotes finishing position)

Year	Entrant	Chassis	Engine	1	2	3	4	5	6	7	8	9	10	11	12	13	14	15	16	17	WDC	Pts.
1974	Token Racing	Token RJ02	Cosworth V8	ARG	BRA	RSA	ESP	BEL; Ret	MON	SWE											18th	1
1974	UOP Shadow Racing Team	Shadow DN3	Cosworth V8								NED; Ret	FRA; Ret	GBR; 8	GER; 6	AUT; Ret	ITA; 10	CAN; Ret	USA; NC			18th	1
1975	UOP Shadow Racing Team	Shadow DN3	Cosworth V8	ARG; 12	BRA; Ret																10th	8
1975	UOP Shadow Racing Team	Shadow DN5	Cosworth V8			RSA; 9	ESP; Ret	MON; Ret	BEL; 6	SWE; Ret	NED; 6	FRA; Ret	**GBR**; Ret	GER; 4	AUT; 3	ITA; 6	USA; NC				10th	8
1976	Shadow Racing Team	Shadow DN5B	Cosworth V8	BRA; 3		USW; Ret	ESP; 8	BEL; 10	MON; 7	SWE; 9	FRA; 8	GBR; 4									12th	10
1976	Lucky Strike Shadow Racing	Shadow DN5B	Cosworth V8		RSA; 7																12th	10
1976	Tabatip Shadow Racing	Shadow DN5B	Cosworth V8										GER; 8	AUT; Ret							12th	10
1976	Tabatip Shadow Racing	Shadow DN8	Cosworth V8												NED; 4	ITA; 8					12th	10
1976	Shadow Racing Team	Shadow DN8	Cosworth V8														CAN; 11	USA; Ret			12th	10
1976	Benihana Shadow Racing	Shadow DN8	Cosworth V8																JPN; Ret		12th	10
1977	Ambrosio Shadow Racing	Shadow DN8	Cosworth V8	ARG; NC		RSA; Ret	USW	ESP	MON	BEL	SWE	FRA	GBR	GER	AUT	NED	ITA	USA	CAN	JPN	NC	0
1977	Ambrosio Shadow Racing	Shadow DN5B	Cosworth V8		BRA; Ret																NC	0

=== Non-championship Formula One results ===
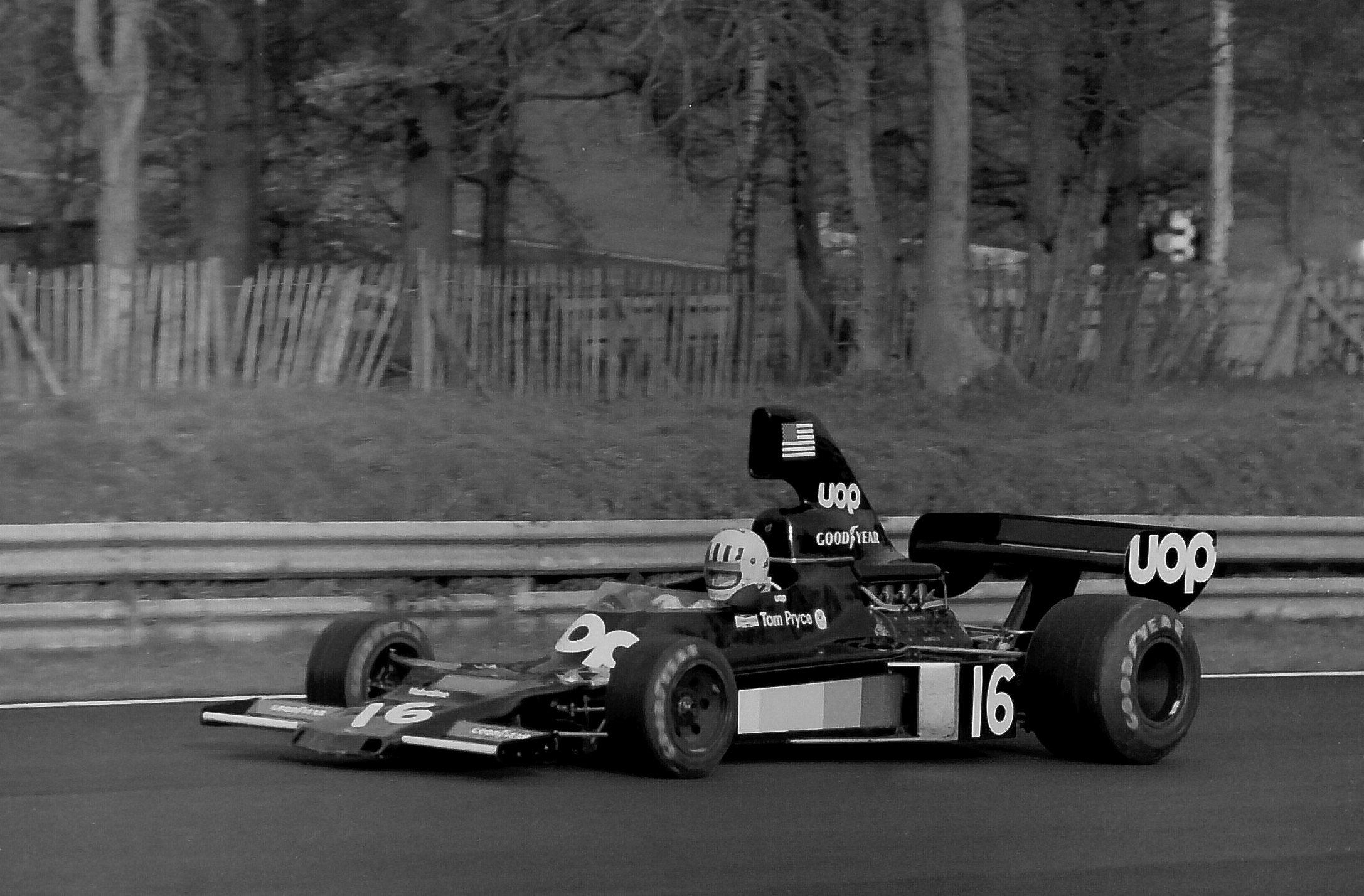
Pryce on his way to victory at the 1975 Race of Champions

(key) (Races in bold indicate pole position; small number denotes finishing position; races in italics indicate fastest lap)

Year	Entrant	Chassis	Engine	1	2	3
1974	Token Racing	Token RJ02	Ford-Cosworth DFV V8	PRE	ROC	INT; Ret
1975	Shadow Racing Team	Shadow DN5	Ford-Cosworth DFV V8	**ROC**; 1	INT; 9	SUI; 7
1976	Shadow Racing Team	Shadow DN5	Ford-Cosworth DFV V8	ROC; 6	INT; 4	

Sporting positions
Preceded by Jacques Laffite	Monaco Formula Three; Winner; 1974	Succeeded by Renzo Zorzi
Preceded by Jacky Ickx	Brands Hatch Race of Champions; Winner; 1975	Succeeded by James Hunt
Preceded by Mark Donohue	Fatal Formula One accidents 5 March 1977	Succeeded by Brian McGuire
