= Vern Schuppan =

Australian racing driver (born 1943)

Vern Schuppan AM
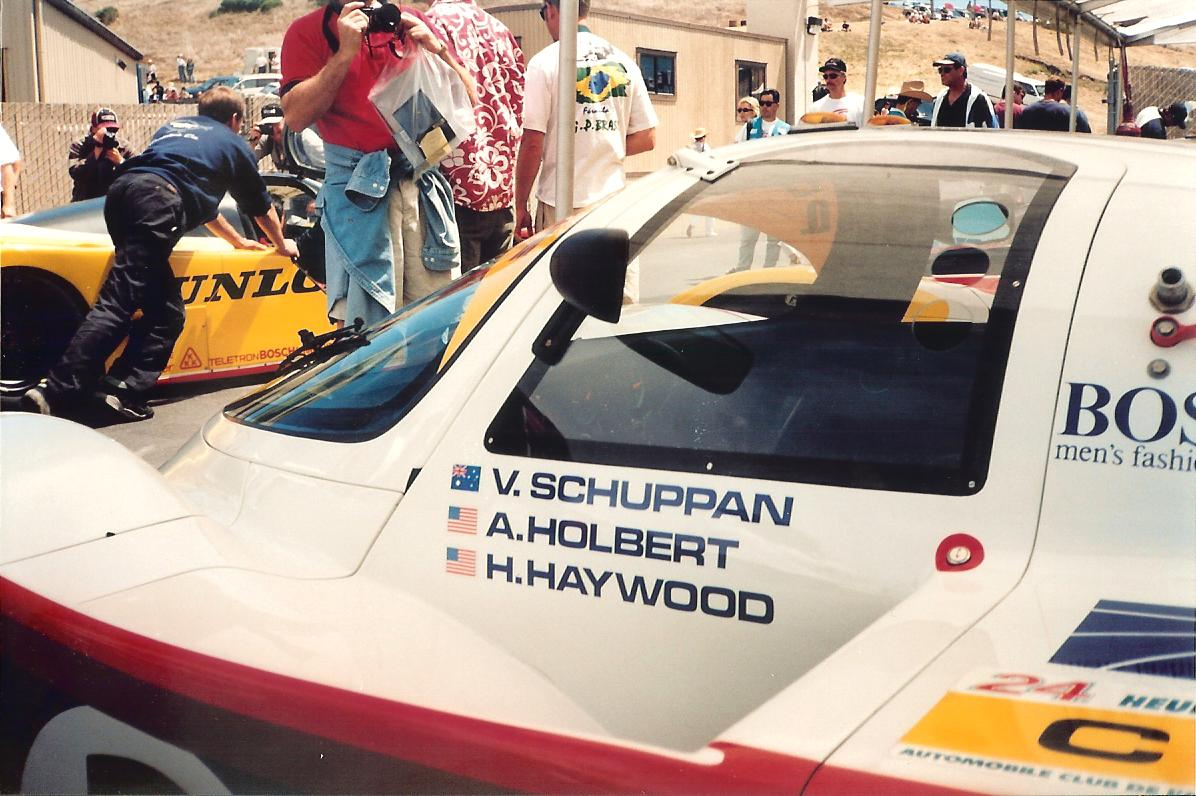
- Closeup of the Porsche 956 in which Schuppan and co-drivers Al Holbert and Hurley Haywood won the 1983 24 Hours of Le Mans.
- Born: Vernon John Schuppan; 19 March 1943 (age 83); Booleroo Centre, South Australia, Australia

Formula One World Championship career
- Nationality: (Australia) Australian
- Active years: 1972, 1974–1975, 1977
- Team(s): BRM, Ensign, Hill, Surtees
- Entries: 13 (9 starts)
- Championships: 0
- Wins: 0
- Podiums: 0
- Career points: 0
- Pole positions: 0
- Fastest laps: 0
- First entry: 1972 Belgian Grand Prix
- Last entry: 1977 Dutch Grand Prix

24 Hours of Le Mans career
- Years: 1973–1979, 1981–1989
- Teams: see below
- Best finish: 1st (1983)
- Class wins: 1

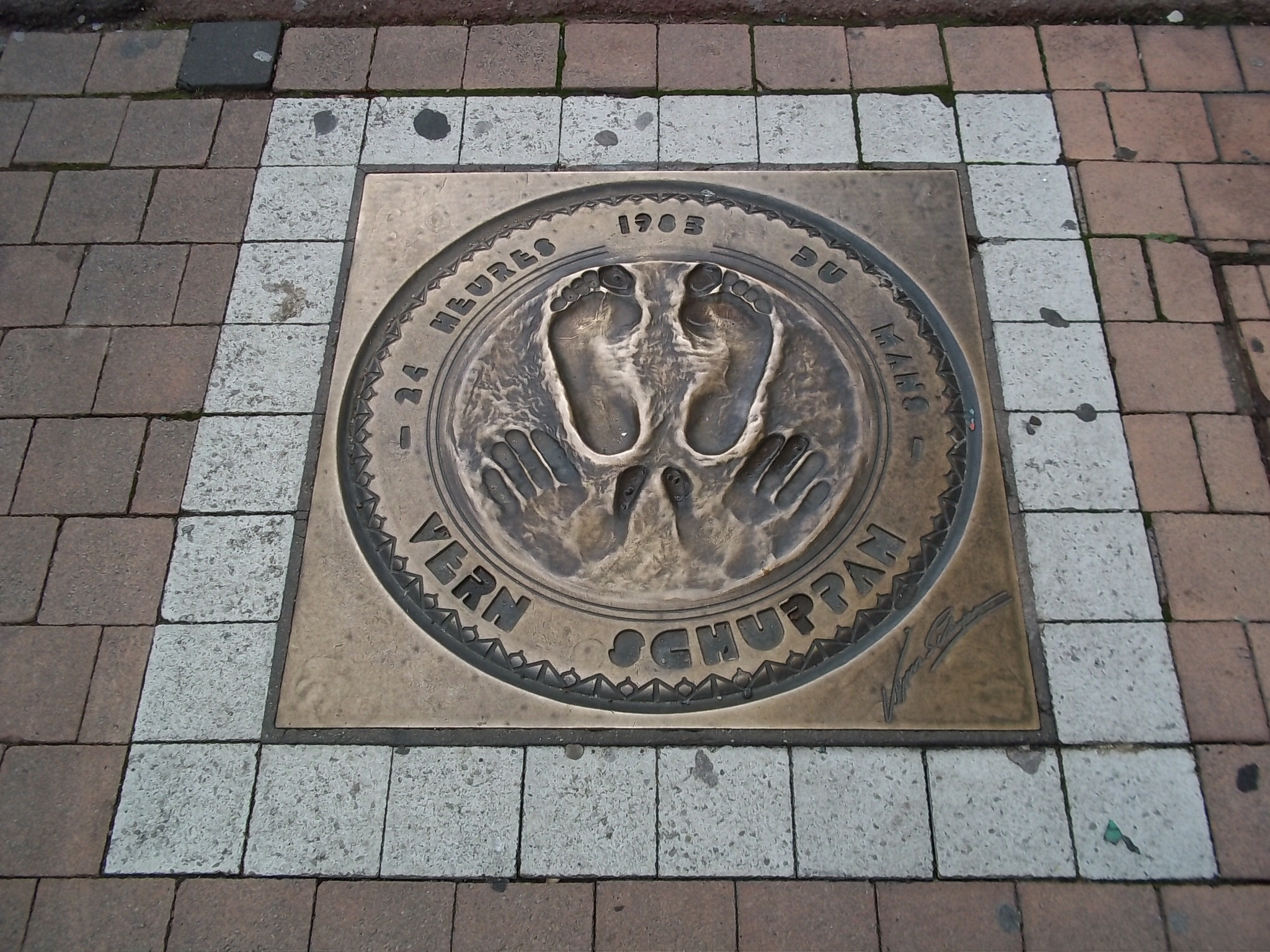
Walk of fame at Le Mans- Winner in 1983

Vernon John Schuppan AM (born 19 March 1943) is an Australian former motor racing driver. Schuppan drove in various categories, participating in Formula One, the Indianapolis 500 and most successfully in sports car racing.

Although he considers himself to be a single-seater driver, Schuppan's biggest career victory was with the factory-backed Rothmans Porsche team when he partnered Americans Hurley Haywood and Al Holbert to win the 1983 24 Hours of Le Mans driving the Porsche 956.

In 1984, Schuppan was made a Member of the Order of Australia for "service to the sport of motor racing".

== Early career and Formula One ==
After a successful karting career in which he won numerous Australian state and national titles, Schuppan made the decision to pursue a career in motor racing. He and his wife Jennifer ventured to Great Britain (with a self-imposed two-year limit of making it big) to allow him to participate in the British Formula Atlantic Championship, which he won, leading to a test with BRM. As BRM's test driver he qualified for the 1972 Belgian Grand Prix at Nivelles-Baulers, but he did not start the race because teammate Helmut Marko commandeered his car, though he did compete in some non-championship races with BRM.

In 1974, Schuppan went to Team Ensign, débuting again in the Belgian Grand Prix where he finished in 15th position. In Monaco, he retired on lap four because of an accident. Schuppan was disqualified in both Sweden and the Netherlands; in Sweden because he started illegally from 26th place on the grid and in the Netherlands for receiving a tyre change outside of the pits. Schuppan failed to qualify in France or Britain. He retired in Germany on lap four because of gearbox problems.

In 1975, Schuppan raced in one race in Sweden for Embassy Racing With Graham Hill team, retiring from the race with transmission problems. In 1977, Schuppan raced for Surtees, finishing 12th in Britain and a career best seventh in Germany. He finished 16th in Austria, but failed to qualify for his final Formula One race in the Netherlands. Schuppan would later describe Surtees team boss, 1964 World Champion John Surtees, as an autocratic owner who "always knew best and wouldn't listen to his drivers" and believes his time with the team was hampered by not being given equal equipment to his teammate Vittorio Brambilla.

== Sports cars ==
Schuppan has had a very successful sports car career, winning the 1983 24 Hours of Le Mans for Porsche's official factory team with Al Holbert and Hurley Haywood in a Rothmans Porsche 956 (No. 3). Holbert drove the final lap of the race with an overheating (and steaming) engine caused by an airflow blockage to the radiator that cooled the heads, it seized as he crossed the finish line. The second placed car, the No. 1 Rothmans Porsche of defending winners Jacky Ickx and Derek Bell (driving) was only 17 seconds behind their teammates at the end of 24 hours of racing.

By winning Le Mans in 1983, Schuppan became only the second Australian to win the French classic, following in the footsteps of 1928 winner Bernard Rubin. Although Rubin was born in Australia, Schuppan is often mistaken for being the first Aussie winner.

Schuppan also finished second at Le Mans in 1977 driving a Mirage GR8-Renault turbo with French F1 driver Jean-Pierre Jarier, and second in 1982 in a Rothmans Porsche 956 with Jochen Mass. He also finished third in 1975 with Jean-Pierre Jaussaud in a Mirage GR8-Ford Cosworth DFV.

After winning at Le Mans, Schuppan went on to win the 1983 Japanese Sports-Prototype Championship.

Schuppan finished sixth at the 1984 24 Hours of Le Mans driving with Jarier and fellow Australian, 1980 World Champion Alan Jones making his Le Mans début (and indeed his only start), in a Kremer Racing Porsche 956B after the factory backed Rothmans team boycotted the event over the Automobile Club de l'Ouest's new fuel restriction rules. Initially, Porsche were not going to release their drivers for the race, but finally relented less than two weeks before the race and Manfred and Erwin Kremer were more than happy for the defending race winner to join them. Schuppan and Jones fought for the lead in the first few hours of the race with the Lancia LC2 of Bob Wollek and Alessandro Nannini, until the nose of the 956 was damaged by a spinning Roger Dorchy at Mulsanne Corner, losing the team a few laps in repairs. The Kenwood sponsored 956 fought back to be again fighting for the lead, and near the end of the race, Jarier was two laps down but catching the leading Joest Racing Porsche driven by Klaus Ludwig and Henri Pescarolo (the eventual winners) by over ten seconds per lap. He then pitted for Schuppan to run the car to the flag. Schuppan got in only one and a half laps before the car broke a conrod with just 90 minutes left to run. As Automobile Club de l'Ouest rules state that for a car to be classified as a finisher it must finish the last lap within a certain time, Schuppan fired up the Porsche and headed out for one last lap and a sixth-place finish.

Schuppan had a number of other podium finishes in the World Sports Car Championship, including second in the 1973 and 1982 Spa 1000 km, third in the 1983 and 1984 Fuji 1000 km and third in the 1985 Selangor 800 km race. Schuppan also placed third in the All Japan Sports Prototype Championship in 1984, 1985 and 1986.

== Other categories ==
Schuppan competed in three Indianapolis 500 races. These were 1976 (where he won the Rookie of the Year award), 1979 and 1981, with a best result of third in 1981 driving a McLaren-Ford. In all, he started 32 CART and USAC Championship races. He won the 1974 and 1976 Macau Grand Prix races, dominating the 1974 race, winning by four laps.

Schuppan also won the 1971 British Formula Atlantic Championship and the Singapore Grand Prix in 1973. He was second in 1972 and also second in the Malaysian Grand Prix in 1972. He raced Formula 5000 in Europe between 1974 and 1975 and in North America 1974-1976 with some success.

In his home country Australia, Schuppan won the 1976 Rothmans International Series run for Formula 5000 cars, driving a Lola T332-Chevrolet. He placed second in the 1976 Australian Grand Prix at Sandown Park in Melbourne driving an Elfin MR8 Chevrolet, only half a second behind winner John Goss in a Matich A53-Repco Holden. He was also runner up in the 1978 Rothmans International Series, driving an Elfin MR8-Chevrolet for fellow South Australian Garrie Cooper, the owner and founder of Elfin Sports Cars and his factory run Ansett Team Elfin.

When Schuppan was regularly returning home to Australia to race he was also a popular choice as a co-driver for top touring car teams such as Allan Moffat Racing, Dick Johnson Racing and the Peter Brock run Holden Dealer Team in the Sandown 400 and Bathurst 1000 races in the late 1970s and early 1980s. His best finish at Bathurst was a fifth place with Dick Johnson in 1978 driving a Ford XC Falcon. He drove for the Holden Dealer Team in 1981, partnering John Harvey in a Holden VC Commodore to fourth place in the Hang Ten 400 after starting the race, but never got to drive the car at Bathurst after a broken front wheel sent Harvey into the guardrail and retirement on lap 37.

Allan Moffat and Schuppan started on pole and were leading the 1976 Hardie-Ferodo 1000 when their XB Falcon GT Hardtop retired with engine failure in lap 87. In a 2013 interview with "Australian Muscle Car" magazine, Schuppan told that Moffat's Falcon was the best touring car he ever drove.

== Other activities ==
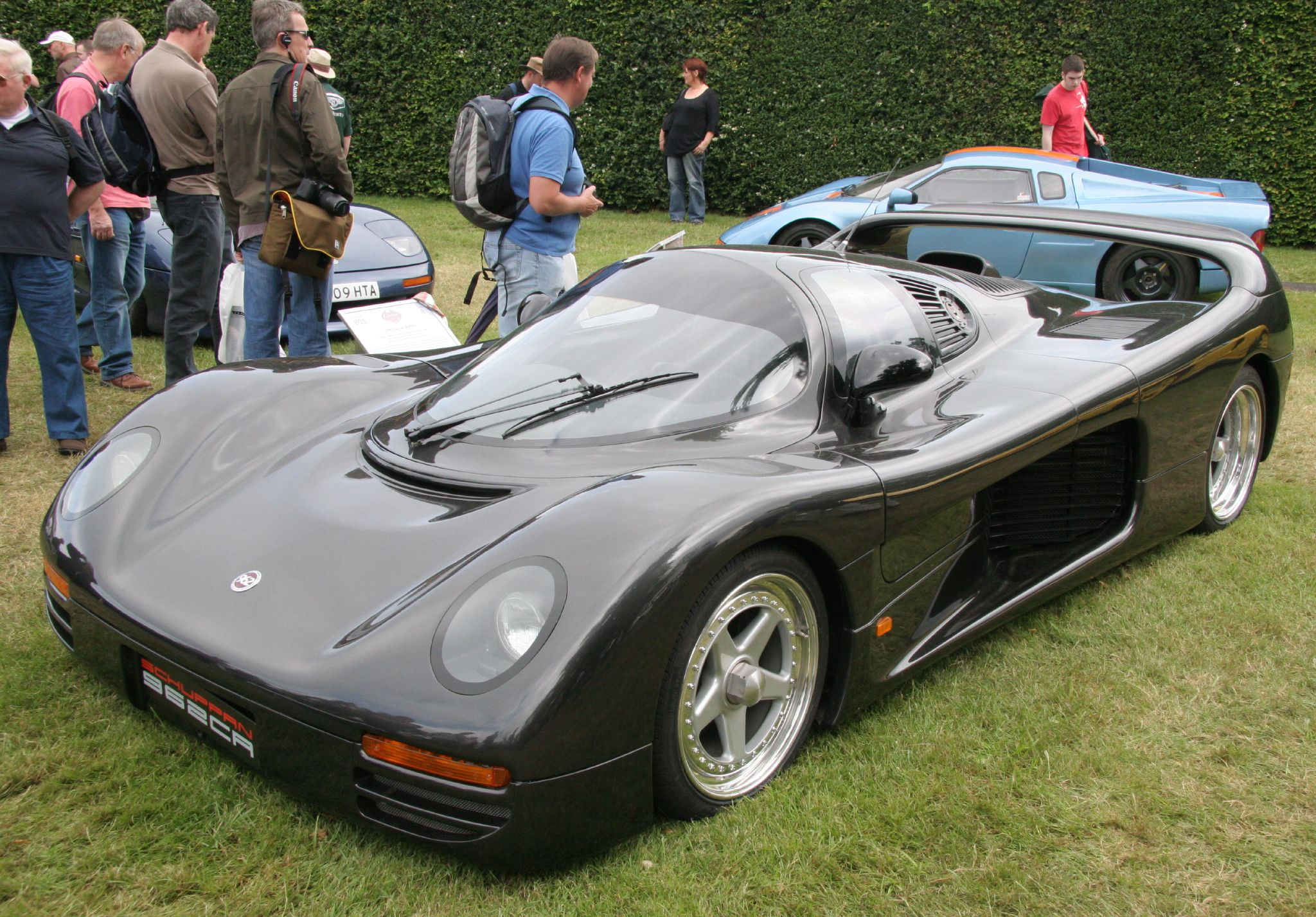
The Schuppan 962CR

With Japanese backing, Schuppan produced minimally modified street legal 962 race cars. The first, known as the 962R and registered in the UK as H726 LDP, retained the original bodywork and honeycomb chassis from its racing career. Later a road going evolution of the Porsche 962 called the Schuppan 962CR was developed, using different bodywork than the 962R. At the then price of 195 million yen (US$1.5 million), only six were built.

Failure of payment for two of the cars shipped to Japan coupled with the high cost of the car's construction and worldwide economic recession, forced Schuppan to declare bankruptcy. Schuppan then also co-owned an Indy Lights team with Stefan Johansson, the pair managed the career of New Zealand born driver Scott Dixon until Schuppan and Johansson had a falling out resulting in Schuppan leaving the partnership.

In May 2006, Schuppan was elected into the Club International des Anciens Pilotes de Grand Prix F1, an eminent organisation based in Monaco.

Schuppan also played an important role in bringing Formula One to the city of Adelaide in his home state of South Australia. F1 boss Bernie Ecclestone had originally favoured the Australian Grand Prix to be held in Sydney. However, the Premier of South Australia, John Bannon, asked Schuppan (who knew Ecclestone personally) to come and take a look at Adelaide. Ultimately Ecclestone was so impressed the Grand Prix was held in Adelaide for eleven years from 1985 to 1995.

As of 2014, Schuppan lives in Adelaide with Jennifer, his wife of over 45 years. The couple live in a converted warehouse adjacent to the Adelaide Street Circuit which hosted the Australian Grand Prix and currently hosts the Clipsal 500 on a modified version of the circuit for V8 Supercars. Despite his over 40 years of international motorsport, Schuppan describes living in a city as a new experience. He is also a regular supporter of the Targa Adelaide tarmac rally.

== Racing record ==
=== Complete Formula One World Championship results ===
(key)

Year	Entrant	Chassis	Engine	1	2	3	4	5	6	7	8	9	10	11	12	13	14	15	16	17	WDC	Pts
1972	Marlboro BRM	BRM P153B	BRM P142 3.0 V12	ARG	RSA	ESP	MON	BEL; DNS	FRA	GBR	GER	AUT	ITA	CAN	USA						NC	0
1974	Team Ensign/Theodore Racing	Ensign N174	Ford Cosworth DFV 3.0 V8	ARG	BRA	RSA	ESP	BEL; 15	MON; Ret	SWE; DSQ	NED; DSQ	FRA; DNQ	GBR; DNQ	GER; Ret	AUT	ITA	CAN	USA			NC	0
1975	Embassy Racing With Graham Hill	Hill GH1	Ford Cosworth DFV 3.0 V8	ARG	BRA	RSA	ESP	MON	BEL	SWE; Ret	NED	FRA	GBR	GER	AUT	ITA	USA				NC	0
1977	Durex Team Surtees	Surtees TS19	Ford Cosworth DFV 3.0 V8	ARG	BRA	RSA	USW	ESP	MON	BEL	SWE	FRA	GBR; 12	GER; 7	AUT; 16	NED; DNQ	ITA	USA	CAN	JPN	NC	0

=== Non-championship Formula One results ===
(key)

Year	Entrant	Chassis	Engine	1	2	3	4	5	6
1972	Marlboro BRM	BRM P153	BRM P142 3.0 V12	ROC	BRA	INT	OUL; 5	REP	
1972	Marlboro BRM	BRM P160C	BRM P142 3.0 V12						VIC; 4
1973	Marlboro BRM	BRM P160D	BRM P142 3.0 V12	ROC; Ret					
1973	Marlboro BRM	BRM P160E	BRM P142 3.0 V12		INT; 9				
1974	Sid Taylor	Trojan T101 (F5000)	Chevrolet 5.0 V8	PRE	ROC; DNS	INT; DNS			
1975	Sid Taylor/Theodore Racing	Lola T332 (F5000)	Chevrolet 5.0 V8	ROC; Ret	INT	SUI			

=== Complete European Formula Two Championship results ===
(key)

Year	Entrant	Chassis	Engine	1	2	3	4	5	6	7	8	9	10	11	12	13	14	15	16	17	Pos.	Pts
1972	Malaysia Singapore Airlines	March 722	Ford	MAL	THR	HOC	PAU	PAL	HOC	ROU	ÖST	IMO	MAN	PER	SAL	ALB	HOC; NC				NC	0
1973	Singapore Airlines	March 722	Ford	MAL; Ret	HOC	THR	NÜR	PAU	KIN	NIV	HOC	ROU	MNZ	MAN	KAR	PER	SAL	NOR	ALB	VAL	NC	0

=== Complete European F5000 Championship results ===
(key) (Races in bold indicate pole position; races in italics indicate fastest lap)

Year	Entrant	Chassis	Engine	1	2	3	4	5	6	7	8	9	10	11	12	13	14	15	16	17	18	Pos.	Pts
1974	Sid Taylor	Trojan T101	Chevrolet 5.0 V8	BRH; Ret	MAL	SIL; Ret	OUL; Ret	BRH; 5														7th	77
1974	Sid Taylor	Lola T332	Chevrolet 5.0 V8						ZOL; Ret	THR; DNS	ZAN; DNS	MUG	MNZ; 6	MAL; 5	MON; 2	**THR**; Ret	BRH; Ret	OUL; Ret	SNE	MAL		7th	77
1974	Chevron Racing Team V.D.S.	Chevron B24/B28	Chevrolet 5.0 V8																		BRH; 1	7th	77
1975	Sid Taylor/Theodore Racing	Lola T332	Chevrolet 5.0 V8	BRH; Ret	OUL; 11	BRH; Ret	SIL; 2	ZOL; Ret	ZAN	THR; DNS	SNE	MAL	THR; Ret	BRH	OUL; 2	SIL	SNE	MAL	BRH			10th	30

=== American open-wheel racing ===
(key) (Races in bold indicate pole position)

==== USAC Championship Car ====
Year	Team	Chassis	Engine	1	2	3	4	5	6	7	8	9	10	11	12	13	14	15	16	17	18	Pos.	Pts
1976	Jorgensen Steel	Eagle 74	Offy 159 ci turbo	PHX	TRE	INDY; 18	MIL	POC	MCH	TWS	TRE	MIL	ONT	MCH	TWS	PHX						NC	0
1977	Wildcat Racing	Wildcat Mk 1	DGS 158 ci turbo	ONT; 8	PHX; 8	TWS; 16	TRE; 17	INDY; DNQ														19th	575
1977	Morales Motorsports	Lightning Mk1/77	Offy 159 ci turbo					INDY; DNQ	MIL	POC; 21					ONT; 6	MCH	PHX					19th	575
1977	Jerry O'Connel Racing	Eagle 74	Offy 159 ci turbo								MOS; 19	MCH	TWS	MIL								19th	575
1978	Fletcher Racing Team	Lightning Mk1/77	Cosworth DFX	PHX	ONT	TWS; 18	TRE; 16	INDY	MOS	MIL	POC	MCH	ATL									38th	26
1978	Patrick Santello	Lightning Mk1/77	Offy 159 ci turbo											TWS; 20	MIL	ONT	MCH	TRE	SIL	BRH	PHX	38th	26
1979	Wysard Motors	Wildcat Mk 2	DGS 158 ci turbo	ONT	TWS	INDY; 21	MIL	POC	TWS	MIL												NC	0
1980	Jerry O'Connel Racing	McLaren M24	Cosworth DFX	ONT	INDY; DNQ	MIL																9th	650
1980	Wysard Motors	Wildcat Mk 2	DGS 158 ci turbo				POC; 5	MOH; 5														9th	650
1981–82	Theodore Racing	McLaren M24B	Cosworth DFX	INDY; 3	POC; 17	ILL	DUQ	ISF														10th	720
1981–82	Kraco Enterprises	Penske PC9B	Cosworth DFX						INDY; DNQ													10th	720
1981–82	Brayton Racing	Penske PC7	Cosworth DFX						INDY; DNQ													10th	720

==== PPG Indycar Series ====
Year	Team	Chassis	Engine	1	2	3	4	5	6	7	8	9	10	11	12	13	14	Pos.	Pts	Ref
1979	Wysard Motors	Wildcat Mk 2	Offy 159 ci turbo	PHX; 21	ATL; 12	ATL; 12											PHX; 14	14th	449	
1979	Wysard Motors	Wildcat Mk 2	DGS 158 ci turbo				INDY; 21	TRE	TRE	MCH; 16	MCH	WGL; 7	TRE; DNS	ONT; 7	MCH; DNS	ATL		14th	449	
1980	Jerry O'Connel Racing	McLaren M24	Cosworth DFX	ONT	INDY; DNQ	MIL												10th	806	
1980	Wysard Motors	Wildcat Mk 2	DGS 158 ci turbo				POC; 5	MOH; 5	MCH	WGL; 18	MIL							10th	806	
1980	Wysard Motors	McLaren M24B	Cosworth DFX									ONT; 10	MCH	MEX	PHX			10th	806	
1981	Theodore Racing	McLaren M24B	Cosworth DFX	PHX	MIL	ATL	ATL	MCH; 24	RIV; DNQ	MIL	MCH	WGL	MEX; 21	PHX; 15				36th	4	
1981	Theodore Racing	March 81C	Cosworth DFX						RIV; 17									36th	4	
1982	Kraco Enterprises	Penske PC9B	Cosworth DFX	PHX	ATL	MIL	CLE; 7	MCH	MIL	POC								30th	18	
1982	Kraco Enterprises	March 82C	Cosworth DFX								RIV; 27	ROA; 24	MCH	PHX				30th	18	

==== Indianapolis 500 ====
Year	Chassis	Engine	Start	Finish	Team
1976	Eagle 74	Offy 159 ci turbo	17	18	Jorgensen Steel
1977	Wildcat Mk 1	DGS 158 ci turbo	DNQ		Wildcat Racing
1977	Lightning Mk1/77	Offy 159 ci turbo	DNQ		Morales Motorsports
1979	Wildcat Mk 2	DGS 158 ci turbo	22	21	Wysard Motors
1980	McLaren M24	Cosworth DFX	DNQ		Jerry O'Connel Racing
1981	McLaren M24B	Cosworth DFX	18	3	Theodore Racing
1982	Penske PC9B	Cosworth DFX	DNQ		Kraco Enterprises
1982	Penske PC7	Cosworth DFX	DNQ		Brayton Racing

=== Complete 24 Hours of Le Mans results ===
Year	Team	Co-drivers	Car	Class	Laps	Pos.	Class pos.
1973	(United Kingdom) Gulf Research Racing	(United Kingdom) Mike Hailwood (United Kingdom) John Watson	Mirage M6 Ford Cosworth	S 3.0	112	DNF	DNF
1974	(United Kingdom) Gulf Research Racing Co.	(Sweden) Reine Wisell	Gulf GR7 Ford Cosworth	S 3.0	49	DNF	DNF
1975	(United Kingdom) Gulf Research Racing Co.	(France) Jean-Pierre Jaussaud	Mirage GR8 Ford Cosworth	S 3.0	330	**3rd**	**3rd**
1976	(United States) Grand Touring Cars Inc.	(United Kingdom) Derek Bell	Mirage GR8 Ford Cosworth	S 3.0	326	5th	4th
1977	(United States) Grand Touring Cars Inc. (France) Mirage Renault	(France) Jean-Pierre Jarier	Mirage GR8 Renault	S +2.0	331	**2nd**	**2nd**
1978	(United States) Grand Touring Cars Inc.	(France) Jacques Laffite (United States) Sam Posey	Mirage GR9 Renault	S +2.0	293	10th	5th
1979	(United States) Grand Touring Cars Inc. Ford Concessionaires France	(France) Jean-Pierre Jaussaud (United Kingdom) David Hobbs	Ford M10	S +2.0	121	NC	NC
1979	(United States) Grand Touring Cars Inc. Ford Concessionaires France	(United Kingdom) Derek Bell (United Kingdom) David Hobbs	Ford M10	S +2.0	262	DNF	DNF
1981	(West Germany) Porsche System	(West Germany) Jochen Mass (United States) Hurley Haywood	Porsche 936	S +2.0	312	12th	**2nd**
1982	(West Germany) Rothmans Porsche System	(West Germany) Jochen Mass	Porsche 956	C	356	**2nd**	**2nd**
1983	(West Germany) Rothmans Porsche	(United States) Hurley Haywood (United States) Al Holbert	Porsche 956	C	370	**1st**	**1st**
1984	(West Germany) Porsche Kremer Racing	(Australia) Alan Jones (France) Jean-Pierre Jarier	Porsche 956B	C1	337	6th	6th
1985	(West Germany) Rothmans Porsche	(United States) Al Holbert (United Kingdom) John Watson	Porsche 962C	C1	299	DNF	DNF
1986	(West Germany) Rothmans Porsche	(West Germany) Jochen Mass (France) Bob Wollek	Porsche 962C	C1	180	DNF	DNF
1986	(West Germany) Rothmans Porsche	(United States) Drake Olson	Porsche 962C	C1	41	DNF	DNF
1987	(West Germany) Rothmans Porsche AG	(France) Bob Wollek (West Germany) Jochen Mass	Porsche 962C	C1	16	DNF	DNF
1988	(West Germany) Porsche AG	(France) Bob Wollek (South Africa) Sarel van der Merwe	Porsche 962C	C1	192	DNF	DNF
1989	(Australia) Team Schuppan	(Sweden) Eje Elgh (Australia) Gary Brabham	Porsche 962C	C1	321	13th	10th

=== Complete Bathurst 1000 results ===
Year	Team	Co-drivers	Car	Class	Laps	Pos.	Class pos.
1976	(Australia) Moffat Ford Dealers	(Canada) Allan Moffat	Ford XB Falcon GT Hardtop	3001cc – 6000cc	87	DNF	DNF
1977	(Australia) Bryan Byrt Ford	(Australia) Dick Johnson	Ford XB Falcon GT Hardtop	3001cc – 6000cc	124	DNF	DNF
1978	(Australia) Bryan Byrt Ford	(Australia) Dick Johnson	Ford XC Falcon GS500 Hardtop	Over 3000cc	153	5th	5th
1981	(Australia) Holden Dealer Team	(Australia) John Harvey	Holden VC Commodore	8 Cylinder & Over	37	DNF	DNF

=== Complete British Saloon Car Championship results ===
(key) (Races in bold indicate pole position; races in italics indicate fastest lap.)

Year	Team	Car	Class	1	2	3	4	5	6	7	8	9	10	11	12	DC	Pts	Class
1985	Mitsubishi Colt Racing	Mitsubishi Starion Turbo	A	SIL	OUL	THR	DON	THR	SIL	DON	SIL; Ret	SNE	BRH	BRH	SIL	NC	0	NC

Sporting positions
Preceded by Inaugural	British Formula Atlantic; Champion; 1971	Succeeded by Bill Gubelmann
Preceded by John MacDonald	Macau Grand Prix; Winner; 1974	Succeeded by John MacDonald
Preceded by Bill Puterbaugh	Indianapolis 500; Rookie of the Year; 1976	Succeeded by Jerry Sneva
Preceded by John MacDonald	Macau Grand Prix; Winner; 1976	Succeeded by Riccardo Patrese
Preceded by Jacky Ickx; Derek Bell	Winner of the 24 Hours of Le Mans; 1983; With: Al Holbert & Hurley Haywood	Succeeded by Klaus Ludwig; Henri Pescarolo
