= Ian Ashley =

British and German racing driver (born 1947)

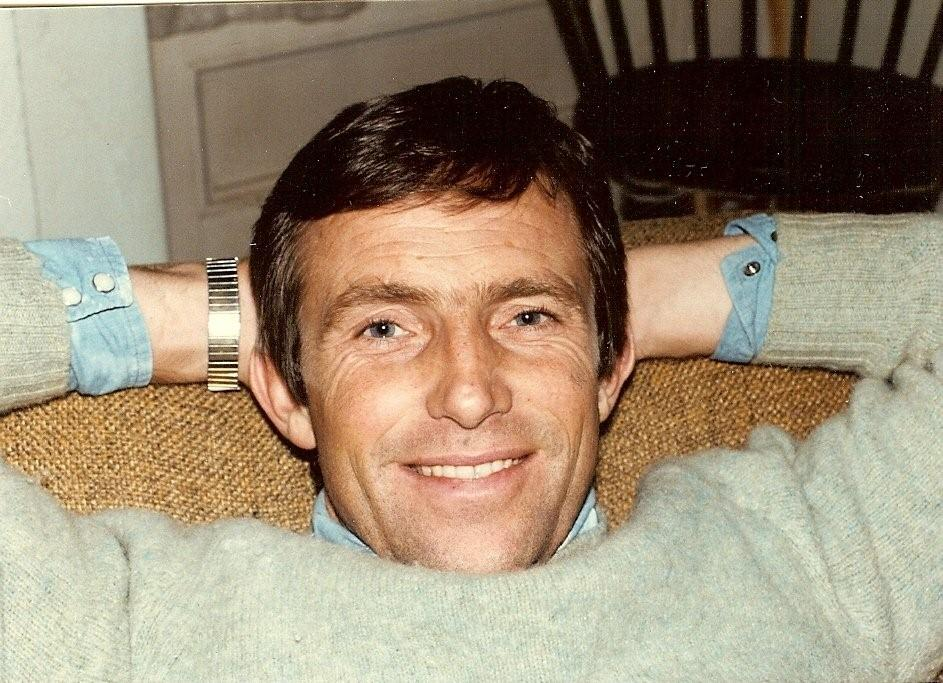
- Born: Ian Hugh Gordon Ashley; 26 October 1947 (age 79); Wuppertal, Germany

Formula One World Championship career
- Nationality: (United Kingdom) British
- Active years: 1974–1977
- Team(s): Token, Williams, BRM, Hesketh; non-works Brabham
- Entries: 11 (4 starts)
- Championships: 0
- Wins: 0
- Podiums: 0
- Career points: 0
- Pole positions: 0
- Fastest laps: 0
- First entry: 1974 German Grand Prix
- Last entry: 1977 Canadian Grand Prix

Ian Hugh Gordon Ashley (born 26 October 1947) is a British and German racing driver who raced in Formula One for the Token, Williams, BRM and Hesketh teams.

== Driving career ==
Ashley began racing in 1966, when he took a course at the Jim Russell Racing School. He was fast but rather erratic, and soon earned the nickname "Crashley". He reached Formula 5000 in 1972 and was a front-runner in 1973. He made his debut in Formula One in 1974, and briefly drove for the Williams team the following year. His luck got worse over the mid-1970s in Formula One. He was to become a victim of two nasty accidents on circuits that were no longer used by Formula One soon after his two accidents. During 1975, at the German Grand Prix at the Nürburgring where during practice, he crashed severely at the tricky Pflanzgarten section and broke both his ankles, and during practice for the Canadian Grand Prix at Mosport Park in 1977, he went over a bump, flipped his Hesketh, vaulted the barrier and crashed into a television tower. He never raced in Formula One again.

In 1985, Ashley made his CART Championship Car debut at the Miami Grand Prix. He was entered in the 1986 Indianapolis 500 but the car did not appear on track. However, he did make three CART starts in 1986 and finished ninth at the Mid-Ohio Sports Car Course, enough for 28th in the championship. He failed to finish in his other two 1986 starts. He also made a single Indy Lights start at Pocono Raceway and finished sixth. He made one more CART appearance in 1987, again in Miami but was knocked out by drivetrain trouble.

After Formula One, Ashley built a career as a pilot for executive jets in the United States. However, in 1993, he made a return to racing, driving a Vauxhall in the British Touring Car Championship. Following this he briefly raced motorcycle sidecar combinations, before a stint in the TVR Tuscan Challenge one-make series.

In November 2009, Ashley competed in Formula Ford for the first time in over 40 years driving an Elden MK8 in the Walter Hayes Trophy at Silverstone.

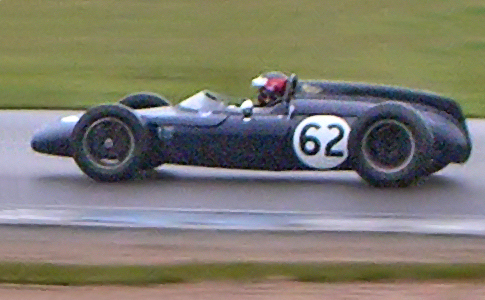
Ashley racing an LDS-Alfa Romeo

== Racing record ==
=== Complete Formula One results ===
(key)

Year	Entrant	Chassis	Engine	1	2	3	4	5	6	7	8	9	10	11	12	13	14	15	16	17	WDC	Pts.
1974	Token Racing	Token RJ02	Cosworth V8	ARG	BRA	RSA	ESP	BEL	MON	SWE	NED	FRA	GBR	GER; 14	AUT; NC	ITA					NC	0
1974	Chequered Flag	Brabham BT42	Cosworth V8														CAN; DNQ	USA; DNQ			NC	0
1975	Frank Williams Racing Cars	Williams FW03	Cosworth V8	ARG	BRA	RSA	ESP	MON	BEL	SWE	NED	FRA	GBR	GER; DNS	AUT	ITA	USA				NC	0
1976	Stanley BRM	BRM P201B	BRM V12	BRA; Ret	RSA	USW	ESP	BEL	MON	SWE	FRA	GBR	GER	AUT	NED	ITA	CAN	USA	JPN		NC	0
1977	Hesketh Racing	Hesketh 308E	Cosworth V8	ARG	BRA	RSA	USW	ESP	MON	BEL	SWE	FRA	GBR	GER	AUT; DNQ	NED; DNQ	ITA; DNQ	USA; 17	CAN; DNS	JPN	NC	0

=== Indy Car World Series ===
(key) (Races in bold indicate pole position; races in italics indicate fastest lap.)

Year	Team	1	2	3	4	5	6	7	8	9	10	11	12	13	14	15	16	17	Rank	Points	Ref
1985	Tom Hess Racing	LBH	INDY	MIL	POR	MEA	CLE	MCH	ROA	POC	MOH	SAN	MCH	LAG	PHX	MIA; 18			48th	0	
1986	Dick Simon Racing	PHX	LBH	INDY	MIL	POR	MEA	CLE	TOR; 15	MCH	POC	MOH; 9	SAN	MCH	ROA; 23	LAG	PHX	MIA	28th	4	
1987	Dick Simon Racing	LBH	PHX	INDY	MIL	POR	MEA	CLE	TOR	MCH	POC	ROA	MOH	NAZ	LAG	MIA; 20			43rd	0	

=== Complete British Touring Car Championship results ===
(key) (Races in bold indicate pole position) (Races in italics indicate fastest lap)

Year	Team	Car	1	2	3	4	5	6	7	8	9	10	11	12	13	14	15	16	17	Pos	Pts
1993	Tamchester Team Maxted	Vauxhall Cavalier	SIL; Ret	DON; 12	SNE; 12	DON; Ret	OUL; 9	BRH; 1; 17	BRH; 2; 13	PEM; 13	SIL; 17	KNO; 1	KNO; 2							23rd	2
1993	Colin Davids Racing	Vauxhall Cavalier												OUL; 17	BRH; 21	THR; Ret	DON; 1; 15	DON; 2; 9	SIL; 19	23rd	2
