= Token Racing =

Formula One team

Token
- Full name: Token Racing
- Base: United Kingdom
- Founder(s): Tony Vlassopulos; Ken Grob
- Noted drivers: (United Kingdom) Tom Pryce (United Kingdom) David Purley (United Kingdom) Ian Ashley

Formula One World Championship career
- First entry: 1974 Belgian Grand Prix
- Races entered: 4
- Constructors: Token-Ford
- Drivers' Championships: 0
- Race victories: 0
- Pole positions: 0
- Fastest laps: 0
- Final entry: 1974 Austrian Grand Prix

Token Racing was a short-lived Formula One team and constructor from the United Kingdom, entering four Grands Prix of the 1974 Formula One season. They qualified three times and scored no championship points.

== History ==
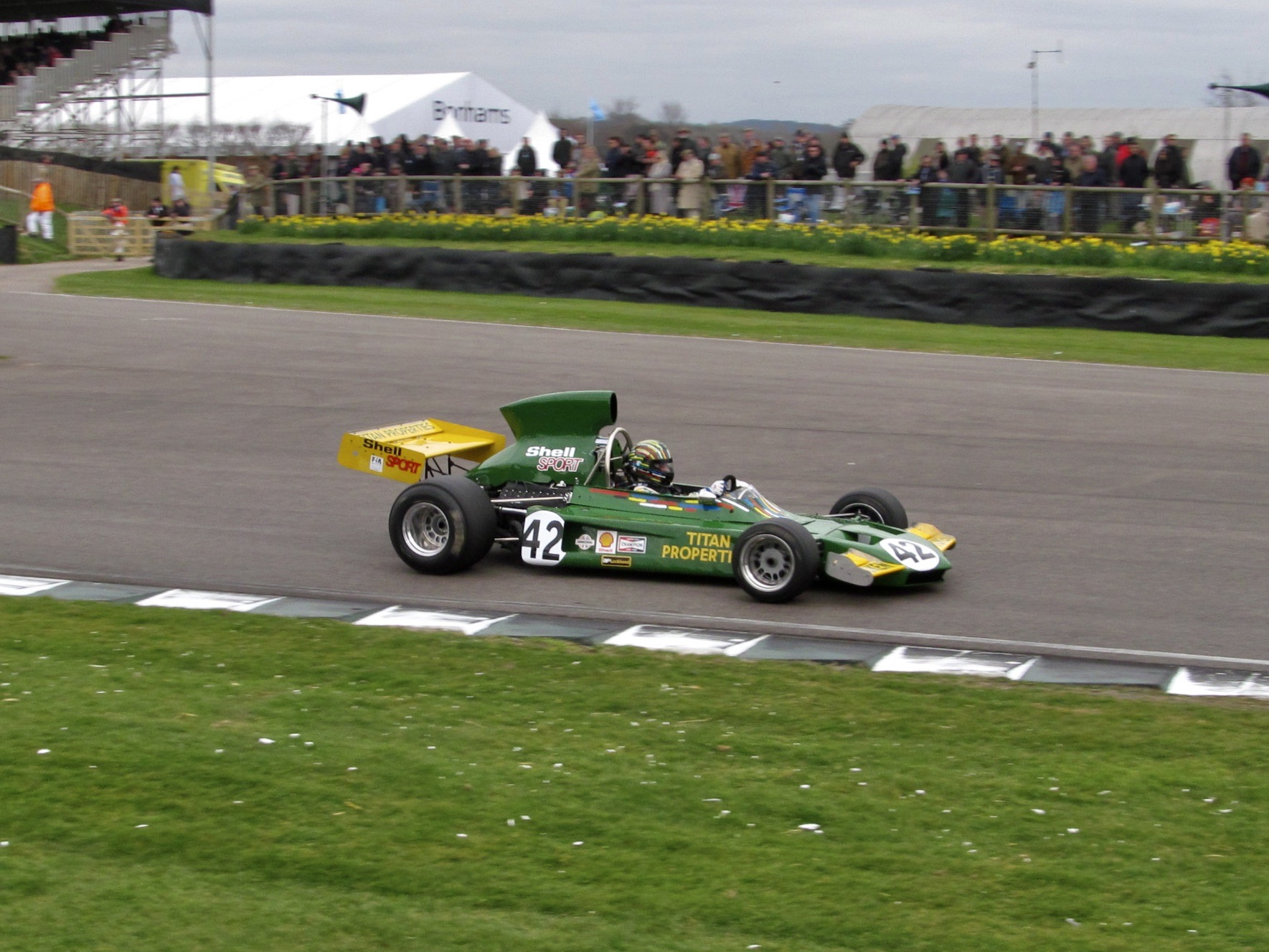
Token RJ02., Goodwood Members' Meeting 2015

Token's history effectively began in 1971. Ron Dennis was trying to find sponsorship for his Rondel Racing team. Through Ron's then-girlfriend, who was the daughter of John Phelps, director of Phelps Antique Furniture in Twickenham, one of its regular customers, Tony Vlassopulos, a barrister son of a Greek shipowner, was asked to sponsor Rondel.

Vlassopulos asked his friend, Ken Grob, chairman of Alexander Howden, insurance brokers in London, if he was interested in joining in. Grob said yes, on the proviso that his young son Ian Grob could be part of the team, which was agreed upon. From that moment forward, Tony Vlassopulos became Dennis's first sponsor.

In late 1973 Rondel Racing, by now a successful Formula Two team founded by Dennis and Neil Trundle, decided to enter F1. Dennis asked Ray Jessop to design the car, while backing was to come from the French oil company Motul, which had sponsored the team for the previous two years, in addition to Vlassopulos and Grob. For 1974, a Ray Jessop-designed F1 car was planned, but the energy crisis affected Motul's support. However, the funds were, in fact, not available to support a F1 leap, even with Motul involved. Trundle continued with the already-designed car from Jessop; Vlassopulos and Grob took over the ownership, with the car becoming the Token, the "To" and the "Ken" coming from the backers' first names and the RJ02 in honour of Jessop.

The team made its F1 debut in April 1974 at the non-Championship International Trophy race at Silverstone, with Welshman Tom Pryce at the wheel. Its first Championship race came the following month, at the Belgian Grand Prix, where Pryce qualified 20th but retired at three-quarter distance following a collision with Jody Scheckter's Tyrrell. The team entered the next race at Monaco but was forbidden from taking part on the basis of Pryce's supposed inexperience, prompting the Welshman to move to the Shadow team. However, upset by this, Vlassopulos took out his Formula 3 racer, Buzz Buzaglo, and then put in Pryce, who then competed in the Formula 3 race for Ippokampos Racing, Vlassopulos' Formula 3 concern, and subsequently won the race.

After sitting out the next three races, Token reappeared at the British Grand Prix with David Purley in place of Pryce. But after failing to qualify, Purley left and was replaced by fellow Englishman Ian Ashley. At the Nürburgring for the next race in Germany, Ashley qualified 26th and last, and ran as high as 8th before a tyre problem dropped him to 14th at the end. Then in Austria, Ashley qualified 24th, but finished unclassified after more wheel problems.

By this stage, however, the team had run out of money, and Vlassopulos and Grob closed it down. The RJ02 subsequently passed into the hands of the Safir Engineering company.

== Complete Formula One World Championship results ==
(key)

Year	Chassis	Engine	Tyres	Drivers	No.	1	2	3	4	5	6	7	8	9	10	11	12	13	14	15	Points	WCC
1974	Token RJ02	Ford DFV V8	F			ARG	BRA	RSA	ESP	BEL	MON	SWE	NED	FRA	GBR	GER	AUT	ITA	CAN	USA	0	NC
1974	Token RJ02	Ford DFV V8	F	(United Kingdom) Tom Pryce	42					Ret											0	NC
1974	Token RJ02	Ford DFV V8	F	(United Kingdom) David Purley	42										DNQ						0	NC
1974	Token RJ02	Ford DFV V8	F	(United Kingdom) Ian Ashley	32											14					0	NC
1974	Token RJ02	Ford DFV V8	F	(United Kingdom) Ian Ashley	35												NC				0	NC
