= 1975 BRDC International Trophy =

- Non-championship race in the 1975 Formula One season
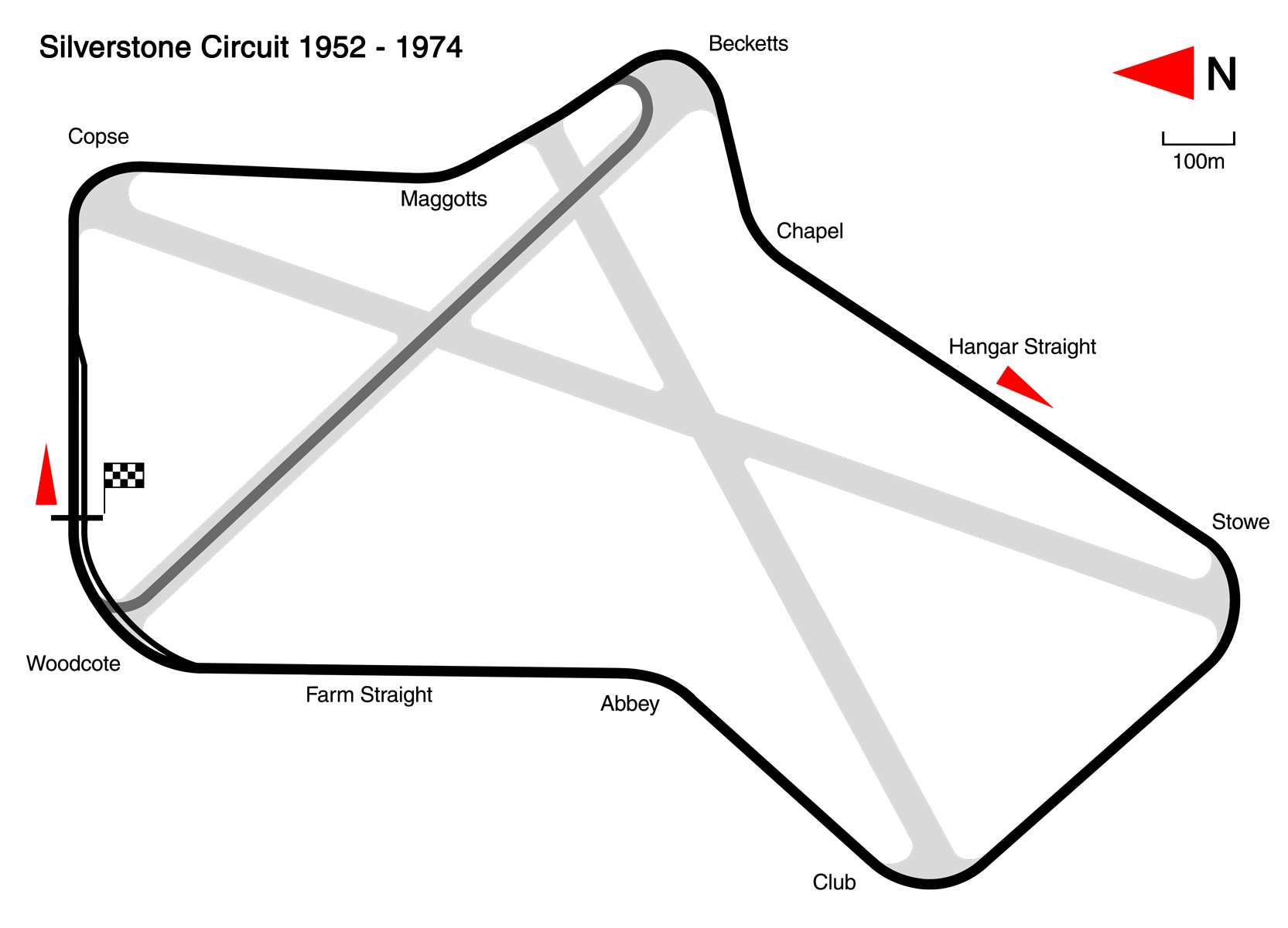
- The Silverstone circuit in early 1975

Race details
- Date: 13 April 1975
- Official name: 27th Daily Express International Trophy
- Location: Silverstone Circuit, Northamptonshire
- Course: Permanent racing facility
- Course length: 4.724 km (2.935 miles)
- Distance: 40 laps, 188.95 km (117.41 miles)
- Weather: Cold, overcast and dry

Pole position
Driver	(United Kingdom) James Hunt	Hesketh-Ford
- Time: 1:17.3

Fastest lap
Drivers	(United Kingdom) James Hunt	Hesketh-Ford
	(Brazil) Emerson Fittipaldi	McLaren-Ford
- Time: 1:17.7

Podium
First	(Austria) Niki Lauda	Ferrari
Second	(Brazil) Emerson Fittipaldi	McLaren-Ford
Third	(United States) Mario Andretti	Parnelli-Ford

The 1975 BRDC International Trophy, formally known as the 27th Daily Express International Trophy, was a non-championship Formula One race held at Silverstone Circuit on 13 April 1975. It was organised by the circuit owners, the British Racing Drivers' Club, as a "curtain raiser" for the European portion of the 1975 Formula One season. James Hunt, driving for the small Hesketh Racing team, set the fastest lap time in practice and took pole position for the start. In the race he continued to run at the front, heading the leading pack for many laps and setting fastest lap of the race on lap 14. Third-place runner, McLaren driver Emerson Fittipaldi, equalled his time on lap 23. However, Hunt's engine failed at the start of lap 26 and the lead was inherited by second-place runner Niki Lauda in his Ferrari. Lauda held the lead for the remainder of the race, despite Fittipaldi "pull[ing] out the stops" to try and pass him. At the finishing flag, Fittipaldi was only one-tenth of a second behind Lauda, with Mario Andretti in a Parnelli taking the last podium position in third.

== Classification ==
Pos	Driver	Constructor	Laps	Time/Retired	Grid
1	(Austria) Niki Lauda	Ferrari	40	52:17.6	2
2	(Brazil) Emerson Fittipaldi	McLaren-Ford	40	+ 0.1	3
3	(United States) Mario Andretti	Parnelli-Ford	40	+ 34.2	9
4	(United Kingdom) John Watson	Surtees-Ford	40	+ 41.9	7
5	(France) Patrick Depailler	Tyrrell-Ford	40	+ 48.1	6
6	(United States) Mark Donohue	Penske-Ford	40	+ 50.3	10
7	(Australia) Alan Jones	Hesketh-Ford	40	+ 58.2	8
8	(Argentina) Carlos Reutemann	Brabham-Ford	39	+ 1:23.7	5
9	(United Kingdom) Tom Pryce	Shadow-Ford	40	+ 1:24.3	4
10	(United Kingdom) Bob Evans	BRM	39	+1 Lap	14
11	(United Kingdom) Graham Hill	Hill-Ford	39	+1 Lap	15
12	(Italy) Lella Lombardi	March-Ford	39	+ 1 Lap	12
13	(New Zealand) John Nicholson	Lyncar-Ford	39	+ 1 Lap	11
14	(United Kingdom) Tony Trimmer	Safir-Ford	39	+ 1 Lap	16
Ret	(Netherlands) Roelof Wunderink	Ensign-Ford	29	Bodywork	13
Ret	(United Kingdom) James Hunt	Hesketh-Ford	25	Engine	1
Ret	(Brazil) Wilson Fittipaldi	Fittipaldi-Ford	1	Electrics	17
DNS	(Sweden) Ronnie Peterson	Lotus-Ford		Engine	
DNS	(Italy) Arturo Merzario	Williams-Ford		Engine	
DNS	(United Kingdom) Jim Crawford	Lotus-Ford		Accident	

Previous race: 1975 Race of Champions	Formula One non-championship races 1975 season	Next race: 1975 Swiss Grand Prix
Previous race: 1974 BRDC International Trophy	BRDC International Trophy	Next race: 1976 BRDC International Trophy
