= 1974 Belgian Grand Prix =

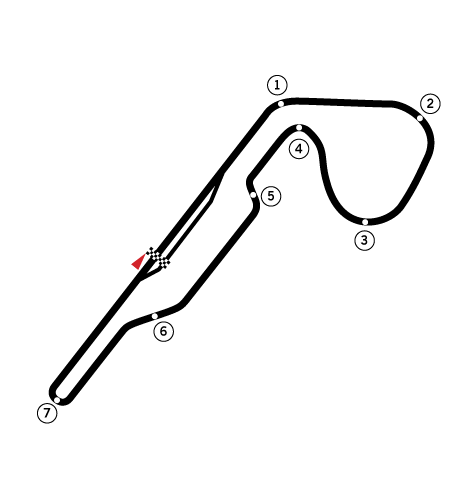
- Circuit Nivelles-Baulers

Race details
- Date: 12 May 1974
- Official name: Bang & Olufsen Grand Prix of Belgium
- Location: Nivelles-Baulers, Brussels, Belgium
- Course: Permanent racing facility
- Course length: 3.72 km (2.314 miles)

Pole position
Driver	(Switzerland) Clay Regazzoni	Ferrari
- Time: 1:09.82

Fastest lap
Driver	(New Zealand) Denny Hulme	McLaren-Ford
- Time: 1:11.31 on lap 37

Podium
First	(Brazil) Emerson Fittipaldi	McLaren-Ford
Second	(Austria) Niki Lauda	Ferrari
Third	(South Africa) Jody Scheckter	Tyrrell-Ford

The 1974 Belgian Grand Prix was a Formula One motor race held at Nivelles on 12 May 1974. It was race 5 of 15 in both the 1974 World Championship of Drivers and the 1974 International Cup for Formula One Manufacturers. The 85-lap race was won by Brazilian driver Emerson Fittipaldi, driving a McLaren-Ford, with Austrian Niki Lauda a close second in a Ferrari and South African Jody Scheckter third in a Tyrrell-Ford. This race also marked the debut of Tom Pryce, making his first start for the newly formed Token team.

This was the second and last Belgian Grand Prix to be held at Nivelles. For most of the next decade, the race would be held at Zolder.

== Qualifying ==
=== Qualifying classification ===
Pos.	Driver	Constructor	Time	No
1	Clay Regazzoni	Ferrari	1:09.82	1
2	Jody Scheckter	Tyrrell-Ford	1:10.86	2
3	Niki Lauda	Ferrari	1:11.04	3
4	Emerson Fittipaldi	McLaren-Ford	1:11.07	4
5	Ronnie Peterson	Lotus-Ford	1:11.21	5
6	Arturo Merzario	Iso-Ford	1:11.29	6
7	Jean-Pierre Beltoise	B.R.M.	1:11.39	7
8	Carlos Pace	Surtees-Ford	1:11.46	8
9	James Hunt	Hesketh-Ford	1:11.53	9
10	Hans-Joachim Stuck	March-Ford	1:11.57	10
11	Patrick Depailler	Tyrrell-Ford	1:11.60	11
12	Denny Hulme	McLaren-Ford	1:11.61	12
13	Mike Hailwood	McLaren-Ford	1:11.98	13
14	Vern Schuppan	Ensign-Ford	1:12.02	14
15	Henri Pescarolo	B.R.M.	1:12.33	15
16	Jacky Ickx	Lotus-Ford	1:12.42	16
17	Jean-Pierre Jarier	Shadow-Ford	1:12.53	17
18	Brian Redman	Shadow-Ford	1:12.73	18
19	John Watson	Brabham-Ford	1:12.76	19
20	Tom Pryce	Token-Ford	1:12.85	20
21	Guy Edwards	Lola-Ford	1:13.33	21
22	Rikky von Opel	Brabham-Ford	1:13.34	22
23	Tim Schenken	Trojan-Ford	1:13.36	22
24	Carlos Reutemann	Brabham-Ford	1:13.47	24
25	François Migault	B.R.M.	1:13.49	25
26	Jochen Mass	Surtees-Ford	1:13.81	26
27	Teddy Pilette	Brabham-Ford	1:14.05	27
28	Gérard Larrousse	Brabham-Ford	1:14.22	28
29	Graham Hill	Lola-Ford	1:14.30	29
30	Gijs van Lennep	Iso-Ford	1:15.60	30
31	Vittorio Brambilla	March-Ford	1:23.81	31
DNQ	Leo Kinnunen	Surtees-Ford	1:28.77	—

== Race ==
Clay Regazzoni got off to an instant lead from pole position. Emerson Fittipaldi was the closest anyone came to Regazzoni, having used the "clean" side of the grid to his advantage, leaving Jody Scheckter to fend off Niki Lauda for third. The rest came into turn 1 together.

The rest of the opening lap was uneventful, with the field quickly settling down. Regazzoni had established a small lead over Fittipaldi, who was left to fend off Scheckter and Lauda, with Ronnie Peterson and James Hunt close behind. Carlos Pace came next with Patrick Depailler, Jean-Pierre Beltoise and Mike Hailwood, while Hans-Joachim Stuck rounded out the field after a terrible start.

The following laps saw three groups form, each seemingly in their own race for the rest of afternoon. The fight for the lead featured the entire top six, who were running around Nivelles-Baulers nose-to-tail behind Regazzoni. The next group was headed by Pace, with his quintet of Depailler, Beltoise, Hailwood and Carlos Reutemann dropping away from sixth placed Hunt, but moving clear of Henri Pescarolo. Pescarolo was providing a bottle neck for the rest of the field, allowing both Jacky Ickx and Stuck to quickly climb up the order.

Unfortunately, the nature of the Nivelles-Baulers meant that overtaking was difficult, and Stuck dropped out of the race with a clutch issue. Ickx entered an intense duel with Arturo Merzario after both barged past Pescarolo. Pescarolo was left to fend off the rest of the field, only to be elbowed into the barriers by Guy Edwards, while Pace suffered a puncture and hence fell to the back of the pack.

Out front the top six remained glued together, unable to make a move on one another as they were all equally matched down the start/finish straight. The leaders came up to lap the backmarkers on lap 25.

Then, the top six came to lap François Migault, who was limping along in the outdated BRM, a few seconds behind Tim Schenken in the new Trojan. Regazzoni and Fittipaldi blasted past the Migault unhindered, before the group came into the braking zone for turn one. Lauda was next in line to take the BRM, but a slight hesitation from Lauda dropped him off the back of Fittipaldi. Once clear of Migault it quickly became clear that Lauda lacked the pace to keep with the leading duo without a tow, and so he tactfully allowed Scheckter past to claim his tow and drag himself back into contention.

Scheckter's strong pace did the trick, and its only took half a lap for the group to reform, aided by the fact that Regazzoni and Fittipaldi were about to lap a slower group of cars just ahead. This time, however, it would be Scheckter who got baulked, and by the time he and Lauda cleared the bunch, Regazzoni and Fittipaldi were four seconds clear. Scheckter and Lauda were therefore left to fight over third, while Peterson and Hunt dropped back after their own issues trying to make their way through the pack.

With the top six now split, it seemed as if the race would be a straight fight between Regazzoni and Fittipaldi for the rest of the afternoon, with the pair equally matched and without the distraction of Scheckter and co. Yet, there was to be one more twist as the pair scythed through the traffic which ultimately destroyed hopes of a fight for the lead. The victim would be Regazzoni, who misjudged a move on the recovering Pace and ran onto the grass, allowing Fittipaldi to charge through into the lead.

The Regazzoni ultimately rejoined behind teammate Lauda, who had pounced on Scheckter just a few corners earlier when the latter got baulked. As all of this was going on, Peterson slipped into the pits to have his front tyres changed, while Hunt had caught up to the back of the shackled Tyrrell after Scheckter's hesitation. Fittipaldi, meanwhile, was left with a one-second lead over Lauda and Regazzoni, with Lauda unable to really attack Fittipaldi.

Elsewhere, various mechanical issues had left Depailler on his own, now running in sixth, while Hailwood had escaped the pack to run in seventh, and was hunting down the Depailler. The Ickx/Merzario fight had ended when the latter retired, while the former's charge up the order ultimately came to an end when he had to stop for fresh tyres. Denny Hulme was making steady progress behind Beltoise, while John Watson and Jean-Pierre Jarier were running close together at the tail end of the top ten.

Hunt suffered a suspension failure, sending him spinning onto the grass. Hailwood, meanwhile, caught and passed Depailler, although the Hunt's race was ruined by a spin a lap later which dumped him back down the order. Hailwood therefore joined the "battle" between Beltoise, Hulme and Jarier, while Depailler soldiered on for a few more laps before his Tyrrell picked up its customary brake problem, forcing him into the pits.

The two Lotus cars, meanwhile, were out of the fight, Peterson and Ickx taking turns to sit in the pits with a variety of issues being attended to, ranging from oil leaks to brake bleeding. Their miserable display was matched by Pace, whose race had come to an end with a vibration, while the sister car of Jochen Mass came to a stop with a suspension failure a few moments later. Jack Brabham's race was also turning into a disaster, with factory drivers Rikky von Opel and Reutemann out, leaving just local racer Teddy Pilette running at the back of the field, while debutante Tom Pryce in the Token had a premature end to the race when Scheckter crashed into his car.

Into the closing stages and it seemed as if the only driver really trying to make a difference was Hailwood, who had been on top form before his pirouette at the chicane. Hailwood was throwing his car around every corner to try to move back past teammate Hulme, and on lap 65 made an optimistic dive into turn one put him ahead. Four laps later and Hailwood pulled a double move on Beltoise and Jarier, at the hairpin, before sprinting off to try to hunt down the now wounded Scheckter.

Before any of that could be resolved, however, a wave of fuel feed problems shuffled the order behind the top two, with Regazzoni losing enough time to let a limping Scheckter through into third on the final lap. Ragazzonu was one of a number of victims of a lack of pickup by the fuel pump, which meant that the car would splutter around certain corners as the final few litres of fuel sloshed around the tank. Watson, Jarier, Vern Schuppan and Pryce (prior to his removal by Scheckter) were also victims of this issue, which vastly distorted the picture of the race.

That late twist did not affect that race winner, however, with Fittipaldi winning half a second clear of Lauda, before a large gap to Scheckter. Regazzoni remained in fourth, running out of fuel as he crossed the line, while Hailwood's run had been brought to an end on the penultimate lap by a similar issue. Hailwood therefore finished a lap down in seventh, behind Beltoise and Hulme, while the wave of late race casualties had promoted Graham Hill and the lowly Lola into eighth, a stunning result for a new car, albeit one that had been artificially created in the closing stages

=== Race classification ===
Pos	No	Driver	Constructor	Laps	Time/Retired	Grid	Points
1	5	(Brazil) Emerson Fittipaldi	McLaren-Ford	85	1:44:20.57	4	9
2	12	(Austria) Niki Lauda	Ferrari	85	+ 0.35	3	6
3	3	(South Africa) Jody Scheckter	Tyrrell-Ford	85	+ 45.61	2	4
4	11	(Switzerland) Clay Regazzoni	Ferrari	85	+ 52.02	1	3
5	14	(France) Jean-Pierre Beltoise	BRM	85	+ 1:08.05	7	2
6	6	(New Zealand) Denny Hulme	McLaren-Ford	85	+ 1:10.54	12	1
7	33	(United Kingdom) Mike Hailwood	McLaren-Ford	84	+ 1 Lap	13	
8	26	(United Kingdom) Graham Hill	Lola-Ford	83	+ 2 Laps	29	
9	10	(Italy) Vittorio Brambilla	March-Ford	83	+ 2 Laps	31	
10	41	(Australia) Tim Schenken	Trojan-Ford	83	+ 2 Laps	23	
11	28	(United Kingdom) John Watson	Brabham-Ford	83	+ 2 Laps	19	
12	27	(United Kingdom) Guy Edwards	Lola-Ford	82	+ 3 Laps	21	
13	17	(France) Jean-Pierre Jarier	Shadow-Ford	82	+ 3 Laps	17	
14	21	(Netherlands) Gijs van Lennep	Iso-Marlboro-Ford	82	+ 3 Laps	30	
15	22	(Australia) Vern Schuppan	Ensign-Ford	82	+ 3 Laps	14	
16	37	(France) François Migault	BRM	82	+ 3 Laps	25	
17	34	(Belgium) Teddy Pilette	Brabham-Ford	81	+ 4 Laps	27	
18	16	(United Kingdom) Brian Redman	Shadow-Ford	80	Engine	18	
Ret	2	(Belgium) Jacky Ickx	Lotus-Ford	72	Overheating	16	
Ret	42	(United Kingdom) Tom Pryce	Token-Ford	66	Collision	20	
Ret	7	(Argentina) Carlos Reutemann	Brabham-Ford	62	Engine	24	
Ret	1	(Sweden) Ronnie Peterson	Lotus-Ford	56	Fuel Leak	5	
Ret	4	(France) Patrick Depailler	Tyrrell-Ford	53	Brakes	11	
Ret	19	(Germany) Jochen Mass	Surtees-Ford	53	Suspension	26	
Ret	43	(France) Gérard Larrousse	Brabham-Ford	53	Tyre	28	
Ret	18	(Brazil) Carlos Pace	Surtees-Ford	50	Handling	8	
Ret	8	(Liechtenstein) Rikky von Opel	Brabham-Ford	49	Engine	22	
Ret	24	(United Kingdom) James Hunt	Hesketh-Ford	45	Accident	9	
Ret	20	(Italy) Arturo Merzario	Iso-Marlboro-Ford	29	Transmission	6	
Ret	15	(France) Henri Pescarolo	BRM	12	Collision	15	
Ret	9	(Germany) Hans-Joachim Stuck	March-Ford	6	Clutch	10	
DNQ	44	(Finland) Leo Kinnunen	Surtees-Ford				

== Notes ==
- This was the Formula One World Championship debut for Belgian driver Teddy Pilette, British driver Tom Pryce, Finnish driver Leo Kinnunen - who was the first Fin to participate in a Formula One Grand Prix - and for French driver Gérard Larrousse.
- This was the Formula One World Championship debut for British constructor Token and the 50th Grand Prix start for British constructor Surtees.
- This was the 63rd pole position for a Ferrari-powered car, breaking the old record set by Ford at the 1974 Brazilian Grand Prix earlier that year.

== Championship standings after the race ==
Drivers' Championship standings

	Pos	Driver	Points
2	1	(Brazil) Emerson Fittipaldi	22
	2	(Austria) Niki Lauda	21
2	3	(Switzerland) Clay Regazzoni	19
	4	(New Zealand) Denny Hulme	11
2	5	(France) Jean-Pierre Beltoise	10

Constructors' Championship standings

	Pos	Constructor	Points
	1	(United Kingdom) McLaren-Ford	35
	2	(Italy) Ferrari	27
1	3	(United Kingdom) BRM	10
1	4	(United Kingdom) Tyrrell-Ford	10
2	5	(United Kingdom) Brabham-Ford	9

- Note: Only the top five positions are included for both sets of standings.

Previous race: 1974 Spanish Grand Prix	FIA Formula One World Championship; 1974 season	Next race: 1974 Monaco Grand Prix
Previous race: 1973 Belgian Grand Prix	Belgian Grand Prix	Next race: 1975 Belgian Grand Prix
