= 1975 ShellSPORT 5000 European Championship =

Seasons
- ← 1974 1976 →

The 1975 ShellSPORT 5000 European Championship was a motor racing series for Formula 5000 cars. The series was organized in the United Kingdom by the British Racing and Sports Car Club, but also incorporated European rounds. It was the seventh and last in a sequence of annual European Formula 5000 Championships, and the first to be contested as the ShellSPORT 5000 European Championship. The 1975 championship was won by Teddy Pilette, driving a Lola T400.

== Calendar ==
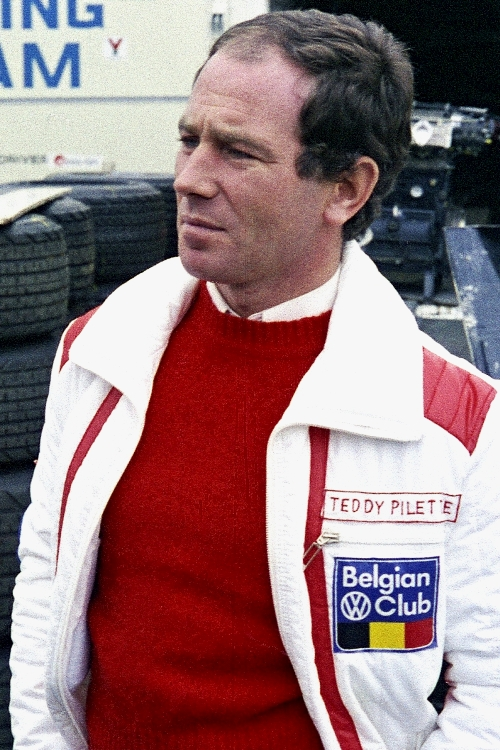
Teddy Pilette won the championship driving for Racing Team VDS

The championship was contested over sixteen rounds.

| Round | Name | Circuit | Date | Winning driver | Car |
| 1 | Brands Hatch Shellsport F5000 | (United Kingdom) Brands Hatch | 15 March | (United Kingdom) Ian Ashley | Lola T330 Chevrolet V8 |
| 2 | Oulton Park Shellsport F5000 | (United Kingdom) Oulton Park | 28 March | (United Kingdom) Gordon Spice | Lola T332 Chevrolet V8 |
| 3 | Brands Hatch Shellsport F5000 | (United Kingdom) Brands Hatch | 31 March | (United Kingdom) David Purley | Chevron B30 Ford GAA V6 3.4 |
| 4 | Silverstone Vanwall Trophy | (United Kingdom) Silverstone | 12 April | (United Kingdom) Richard Scott | Lola T400 Chevrolet V8 |
| 5 | Zolder Limburg Trophee | (Belgium) Zolder | 27 April | (United Kingdom) Peter Gethin | Lola T400 Chevrolet V8 |
| 6 | Zandvoort Duinen Trophee | (Netherlands) Zandvoort | 19 May | (United Kingdom) Peter Gethin | Lola T400 Chevrolet V8 |
| 7 | Shellsport F5000 Thruxton I | (United Kingdom) Thruxton | 26 May | (United Kingdom) Ian Ashley | Lola T330 Chevrolet V8 |
| 8 | Snetterton Shellsport F5000 | (United Kingdom) Snetterton | 27 July | (United Kingdom) Bob Evans | Lola T332 Chevrolet V8 |
| 9 | Mallory Park Shellsport F5000 | (United Kingdom) Mallory Park | 10 August | (Belgium) Teddy Pilette | Lola T400 Chevrolet V8 |
| 10 | Thruxton Andover Mayoral Trophy | (United Kingdom) Thruxton | 17 August | (Belgium) Teddy Pilette | Lola T400 Chevrolet V8 |
| 11 | Brands Hatch Shellsport F5000 | (United Kingdom) Brands Hatch | 25 August | (Australia) Alan Jones | March 75A Ford GAA V6 3.4 |
| 12 | Oulton Park Gold Cup | (United Kingdom) Oulton Park | 6 September | (United Kingdom) David Purley | Chevron B30 Ford GAA V6 3.4 |
| 13 | Silverstone Shellsport F5000 | (United Kingdom) Silverstone | 28 September | (Australia) Alan Jones | March 75A Ford GAA V6 3.4 |
| 14 | Shellsport F5000 Snetterton II | (United Kingdom) Snetterton | 5 October | (Belgium) Teddy Pilette | Lola T400 Chevrolet V8 |
| 15 | Mallory Park Shellsport F5000 | (United Kingdom) Mallory Park | 12 October | (Belgium) Teddy Pilette | Lola T400 Chevrolet V8 |
| 16 | Brands Hatch Shellsport Motorshow 200 | (United Kingdom) Brands Hatch | 19 October | (United Kingdom) Peter Gethin | Lola T400 Chevrolet V8 |

== Points system ==
Championship points were awarded on a 20–15–12–10–8–6–4–3–2–1 basis for the first ten places at each of the first fifteen rounds and on a 40–30–24–20–16–12–8–6–4–2 basis for the first ten places at the final round. Each driver could retain points from twelve rounds.

== Championship standings ==
| Position | Driver | Car | Entrant | Points |
| 1 | Teddy Pilette | Lola T400 Chevrolet | Racing Team VDS | 174 |
| 2 | Peter Gethin | Lola T400 Chevrolet | Racing Team VDS | 143 |
| 3 | Guy Edwards | Lola T332 Chevrolet | | 122 |
| 4 | Ian Ashley | Lola T330 Chevrolet; Lola T400 Chevrolet | Richard Oaten Racing | 101 |
| 5 | David Purley | Chevron B30 Ford V6 | Lec Refrigeration | 98 |
| 6 | Richard Scott | Lola T400 Chevrolet; Lola T330 Chevrolet | Alan McKechnie Racing; John Turner | 85 |
| 7 | Alan Jones | Chevron B28 Chevrolet; March 751 Ford V6 | RAM Racing | 64 |
| = | Bob Evans | Lola T332 Chevrolet; Lola T400 Chevrolet | Theodore Racing; Reed Racing; Alan McKechnie Racing | 64 |
| 9 | Brian Robinson | McLaren M19 Chevrolet | | 49 |
| 10 | Vern Schuppan | Lola T332 Chevrolet | Theodore Racing | 30 |
| = | Gordon Spice | Lola T332 Chevrolet | Reed Racing | 30 |
| 12 | Tony Dean | Chevron B24 Chevrolet; Chevron B28 Chevrolet | AG Dean | 28 |
| 13 | Mick Hill | March 74A Chevrolet | | 27 |
| 14 | Chris Featherstone | McRae GM1 Chevrolet | | 26 |
| 15 | Ingo Hoffman | Chevron B28 Chevrolet | AG Dean | 24 |
| = | John Turner | Lola T330 Chevrolet | | 24 |
| 17 | Brian McGuire | Lola T332 Chevrolet | | 22 |
| 18 | Tom Belsø | Lola T330 Chevrolet | | 20 |
| = | Damien Magee | Trojan T101 Chevrolet; Chevron B24/B28 Chevrolet | Jim Kelly; RAM Racing | 20 |
| 20 | Tom Walkinshaw | Modus M5 Ford V6; March 752 Ford V6 | ShellSPORT | 19 |
| 21 | Leen Verhoeven | Lola T330 Chevrolet | | 15 |
| 22 | Tony Brise | Lola T332 Chevrolet | Theodore Racing | 15 |
| 23 | Mike Wilds | March 74A Chevrolet | Mick Hill | 12 |
| 24 | Bill Gubelmann | Lola T332 Chevrolet | Reed Racing | 11 |
| 25 | Keith Holland | Lola T330 Chevrolet | John Turner | 10 |
| 26 | Dennis Leech | Chevron B24 Chevrolet | | 9 |
| 27 | Boy Hayje | March 731 Ford V6 | Hezemans Racing | 8 |
| 28 | Trevor Twaites | Lola T330 Chevrolet | | 5 |
| 29 | Dave Walker | Chevron B28 Chevrolet | RAM Racing | 4 |
