= 1973 SCCA L&M Championship =

Open wheel racing running in the U.S.

Seasons
- ← 1972 1974 →

The 1973 SCCA L&M Championship was the seventh annual running of the Sports Car Club of America's professional open wheel racing series. The championship, which was open to Formula 5000 cars, was won by South African driver Jody Scheckter.

== Race schedule ==
The championship was contested over a nine race series.

| Race | Date | Circuit | Distance | Winning driver | Winning car |
|---|---|---|---|---|---|
| 1 | April 29 | Riverside International Raceway | 40 laps | (United Kingdom) Brian Redman | Lola T330 - Chevrolet V8 |
| 2 | May 6 | Laguna Seca Raceway | 45 laps | (South Africa) Jody Scheckter | Trojan T101 - Chevrolet V8 |
| 3 | May 20 | Michigan International Speedway | 25 laps | (South Africa) Jody Scheckter | Trojan T101 - Chevrolet V8 |
| 4 | June 3 | Mid-Ohio Sports Car Course | 42 laps | (South Africa) Jody Scheckter | Trojan T101 - Chevrolet V8 |
| 5 | June 17 | Watkins Glen International | 30 laps | (South Africa) Jody Scheckter | Lola T330 - Chevrolet V8 |
| 6 | July 29 | Road America | 25 laps | (United Kingdom) Brian Redman | Lola T330 - Chevrolet V8 |
| 7 | August 19 | Road Atlanta | 30 laps | (United Kingdom) Brian Redman | Lola T330 - Chevrolet V8 |
| 8 | September 3 | Pocono International Raceway | 45 laps | (United Kingdom) Brian Redman | Lola T330 - Chevrolet V8 |
| 9 | September 30 | Seattle International Raceway | 36 laps | (United Kingdom) Brian Redman | Lola T330 - Chevrolet V8 |

== Points system ==
Championship points were awarded on a 20-15-12-10-8-6-4-3-2-1 basis for the first ten positions in each race.

== Championship standings ==
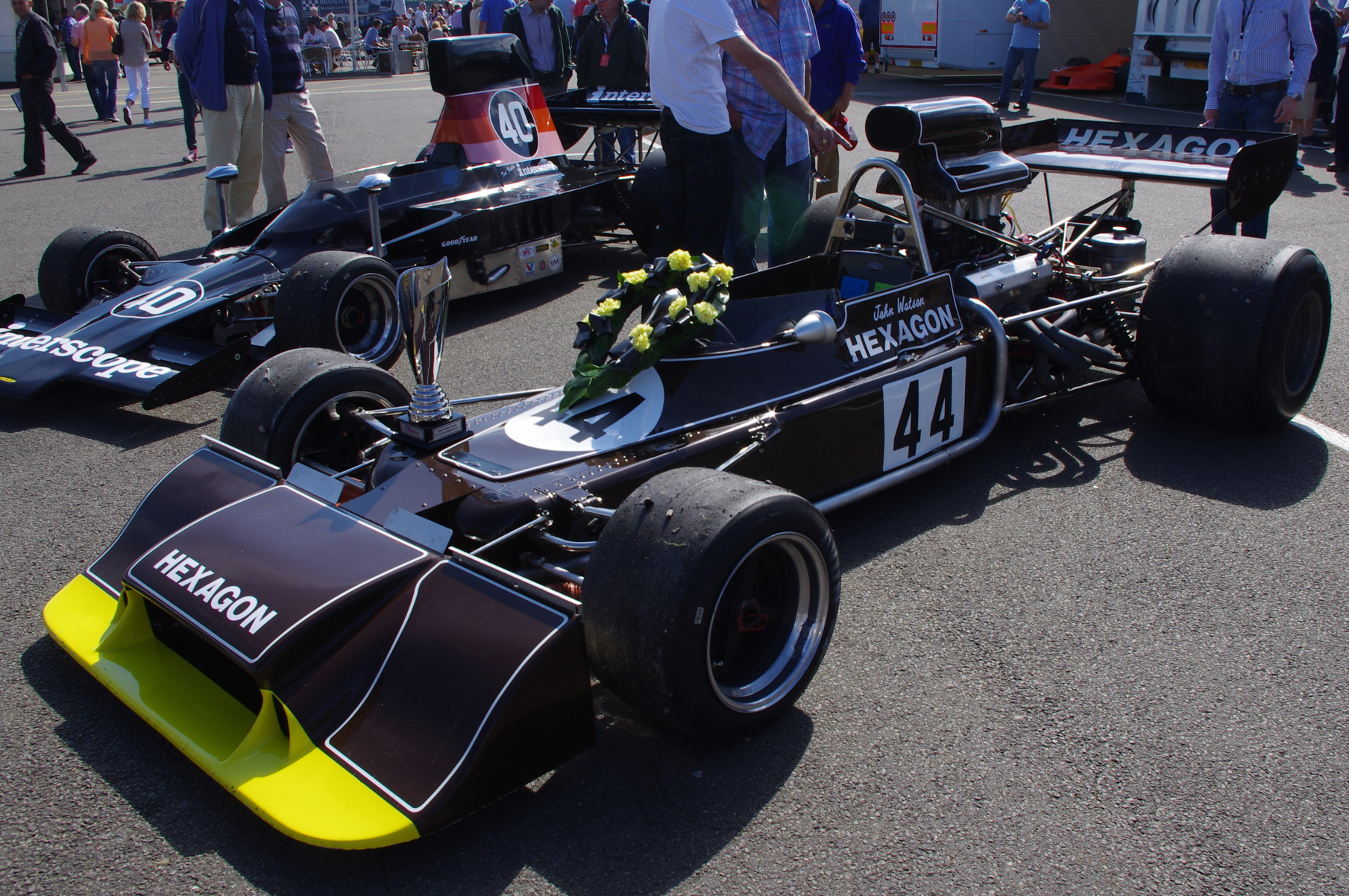
Jody Scheckter won the 1973 SCCA L&M Championship driving a Trojan T101 (similar to that pictured above) and a Lola T330

| Position | Driver | Car | Points |
|---|---|---|---|
| 1 | (South Africa) Jody Scheckter | Trojan T101 Chevrolet & Lola T330 Chevrolet | 144 |
| 2 | (United Kingdom) Brian Redman | Lola T330 Chevrolet | 130 |
| 3 | (United States) Mark Donohue | Lola T330 AMC | 64 |
| 4 | (United Kingdom) Peter Gethin | Chevron B24 Chevrolet | 49 |
| 5 | (United Kingdom) David Hobbs | Lola T330 Chevrolet | 48 |
| 6 | (Canada) Eppie Wietzes | Lola T330 Chevrolet | 45 |
| 7 | (United States) Brett Lunger | Lola T330 Chevrolet | 39 |
| 8 | (United States) Tony Adamowicz | Lola T330 Chevrolet | 38 |
| 9 | (United States) Jon Woodner | McRae GM1 Chevrolet | 16 |
| 10 | (United Kingdom) Derek Bell | Lola T330 Chevrolet | 15 |
| 11 | (United States) Tony Settember | McLaren M10/18 Chevrolet | 15 |
| 12 | (Australia) Max Stewart | Lola T330 Chevrolet | 14 |
| 13 | (United Kingdom) Bob Brown | Chevron B24 Chevrolet | 12 |
| 14 | (United States) Gus Hutchison | March 73A Chevrolet | 12 |
| 15 | (United States) Steve Pieper | Lola T300 Chevrolet | 11 |
| 16 | (Australia) Frank Matich | Matich A51 Repco Holden | 8 |
| = | (United States) Gordon Smiley | McRae GM1 Chevrolet | 8 |
| = | (United States) Gerard Raney | Eagle Mk 5 Chevrolet | 8 |
| 19 | (United States) Warren Flickenger | Lola T330 Chevrolet | 8 |
| 20 | (United States) Bob Lazier | Lola T330 Chevrolet | 7 |
| 21 | (Australia) Johnnie Walker | Matich A50 Repco Holden | 6 |
| 22 | (United States) Evan Noyes | McRae GM1 Chevrolet | 5 |
| 23 | (New Zealand) Graham McRae | McRae GM1 Chevrolet | 5 |
| 24 | (United States) Gordon Mefertt | McRae GM1 Chevrolet | 4 |
| = | (United States) Mike Brockman | Lola T300 Chevrolet | 4 |
| 26 | (United States) Eddie Miller | Lola T330 Chevrolet | 3 |
| 27 | (United States) John Gimbel | Matich A50 Ford | 3 |
| 28 | (United States) Skip Barber | March 73A Chevrolet | 2 |
| = | (United States) Syd Demovsky | Surtees TS8 Chevrolet | 2 |
| 30 | (Australia) Bob Muir | Lola T330 Chevrolet | 1 |
| = | (United States) John Gunn | March 73A Chevrolet | 1 |
| = | (Canada) Horst Kroll | Lola T300 Chevrolet | 1 |
| = | (United States) Robert Fischetti | FA101 Chevrolet | 1 |
