= 1974 Rothmans 5000 European Championship =

Seasons
- ← 1973 1975 →

The 1974 Rothmans 5000 European Championship was a motor racing series for Formula 5000 cars. The series was organized in the United Kingdom by the British Racing and Sports Car Club, but also incorporated European rounds. It was the sixth in a sequence of annual European Formula 5000 Championships, and the second to be contested as the Rothmans 5000 European Championship. The 1974 championship was won by Bob Evans, driving a Lola T332.

== Calendar ==
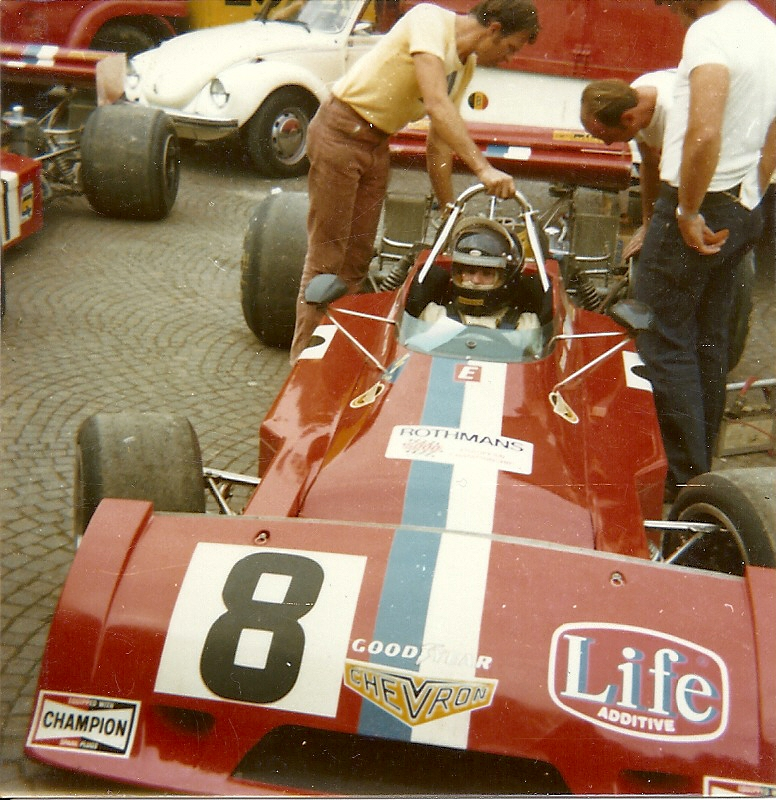
Peter Gethin placed second in the championship driving a Chevron B28

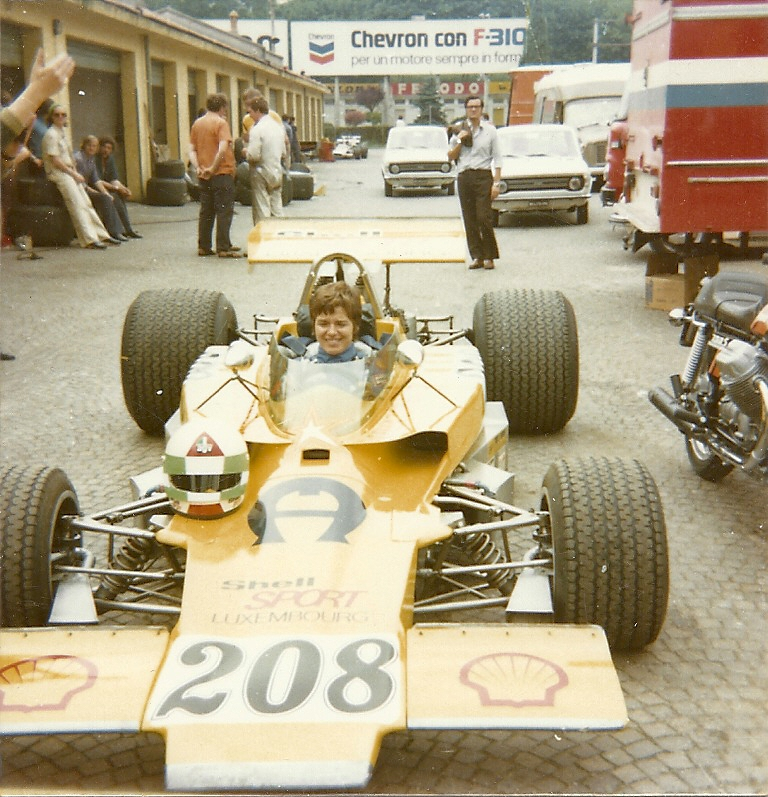
Lela Lombardi placed fifth driving a Lola T330

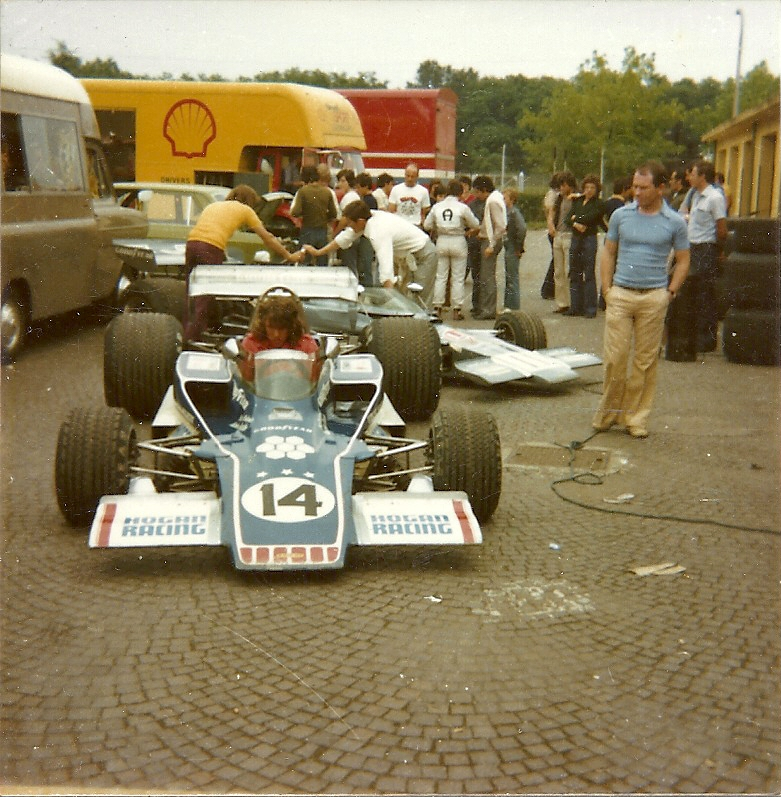
David Hobbs placed sixth driving a Lola T330

The championship was contested over eighteen rounds.

Round	Name	Circuit	Date	Winning driver	Car
1	Brands Hatch Rothmans F5000	(United Kingdom) Brands Hatch	16 March	(United Kingdom) Peter Gethin	Chevron B28 Chevrolet
2	Mallory Park Rothmans F5000	(United Kingdom) Mallory Park	24 March	(United Kingdom) David Hobbs	Lola T330 Chevrolet
3	Silverstone Vanwall Trophy	(United Kingdom) Silverstone	6 April	(United Kingdom) Brian Redman	Lola T332 Chevrolet
4	Oulton Park Rothmans F5000	(United Kingdom) Oulton Park	12 April	(United Kingdom) Brian Redman	Lola T332 Chevrolet
5	Brands Hatch Rothmans F5000	(United Kingdom) Brands Hatch	15 April	(United Kingdom) Bob Evans	Lola T332 Chevrolet
6	Zolder Limburg Trophee	(Belgium) Zolder	28 April	(United Kingdom) Peter Gethin	Chevron B28 Chevrolet
7	Thruxton Rothmans F5000	(United Kingdom) Thruxton	27 May	(United Kingdom) Ian Ashley	Lola T330 Chevrolet
8	Zandvoort Duinen Trophee	(Netherlands) Zandvoort	3 June	(United Kingdom) Peter Gethin	Chevron B28 Chevrolet
9	Mugello Rothmans F5000	(Italy) Mugello	23 June	(United Kingdom) David Hobbs	Lola T330 Chevrolet
10	GP della Lotteria	(Italy) Monza	30 June	(United Kingdom) Peter Gethin	Chevron B28 Chevrolet
11	Mallory Park Rothmans F5000	(United Kingdom) Mallory Park	14 July	(United Kingdom) Bob Evans	Lola T332 Chevrolet
12	Mondello Park Dublin GP	(Republic of Ireland) Mondello Park	28 July	(United Kingdom) Bob Evans	Lola T332 Chevrolet
13	Thruxton Rothmans F5000	(United Kingdom) Thruxton	18 August	(United Kingdom) Bob Evans	Lola T332 Chevrolet
14	Brands Hatch Rothmans F5000	(United Kingdom) Brands Hatch	26 August	(United Kingdom) Tony Dean	Chevron B24 Chevrolet
15	Oulton Park Gold Cup	(United Kingdom) Oulton Park	8 September	(United Kingdom) Ian Ashley	Lola T330 Chevrolet
16	Snetterton Rothmans F5000	(United Kingdom) Snetterton	6 October	(Denmark) Tom Belsø	Lola T330 Chevrolet
17	Mallory Park Rothmans F5000	(United Kingdom) Mallory Park	13 October	(United Kingdom) Guy Edwards	Lola T332 Chevrolet
18	Brands Hatch Rothmans Motorshow 200	(United Kingdom) Brands Hatch	20 October	(Australia) Vern Schuppan	Chevron B24 Chevrolet

== Points system ==
Championship points were awarded on a 20–15–12–10–8–6–4–3–2–1 basis for the first ten places at each of the first seventeen rounds and on a 40–30–24–20–16–12–8–6–4–2 basis for the first ten places at the final round. Each driver could retain points from fourteen rounds.

== Championship standings ==
Position	Driver	Car	Entrant	Points
1	Bob Evans	Lola T332 Chevrolet	Alan McKechnie Racing	193
2	Peter Gethin	Chevron B28 Chevrolet	Chevron Racing Team VDS	186
3	Ian Ashley	Lola T330 Chevrolet	ShellSPORT Luxembourg	152
4	Teddy Pilette	Chevron B28 Chevrolet	Chevron Racing Team VDS	108
5	Lella Lombardi	Lola T330 Chevrolet	ShellSPORT Luxembourg	88
6	David Hobbs	Lola T330 Chevrolet	Hogan Racing Ltd	81
7	Vern Schuppan	Trojan T101 Chevrolet; Lola T332 Chevrolet; Chevron B24/B28 Chevrolet	Sid Taylor; Chevron Racing Team VDS	77
8	Tom Belsø	Lola T330 Chevrolet		72
9	Brian Redman	Lola T332 Chevrolet	Sid Taylor	67
9	Chris Craft	Chevron B24/B28 Chevrolet; Brabham BT43 Chevrolet	Crowne Racing	67
11	Mike Wilds	March 74A Chevrolet	Dempster International Racing	58
12	Clive Santo	Lola T330 Chevrolet		42
12	Brian Robinson	McLaren M19 Chevrolet	Anglo-American Racing	42
14	Damien Magee	Lola T330 Chevrolet; Trojan T101 Chevrolet; Chevron B24 Chevrolet	AW Brown Racing	41
15	Guy Edwards	Lola T332 Chevrolet	John Butterworth	37
16	Tony Dean	Chevron B24 Chevrolet	Anglo-American Racing	28
17	Patrick Summer	Trojan T101 Chevrolet		27
18	Brian McGuire	Trojan T101 Chevrolet; Lola T332 Chevrolet		25
19	Keith Holland	Trojan T102 Chevrolet; Lola T332 Chevrolet	Ian Ward Racing; John Butterworth	20
20	Steve Thompson	Chevron B24 Chevrolet; Trojan T102 Chevrolet	Servis Racing; Ian Ward Racing	17
21	Roelof Wunderink	Chevron B24 Chevrolet		14
22	Leen Verhoeven	Lola T330 Chevrolet; Trojan T101 Chevrolet	Hogan Racing Ltd; Sid Taylor	11
23	Derek Bell	Lola T330 Chevrolet	Hogan Racing Ltd	10
24	Eddie Keizan	Lola T332 Chevrolet	John Butterworth	8
25	Trevor Twaites	Lola T330 Chevrolet		8
26	Nick Wattiez	Lola T330 Chevrolet		5
27	Clive Baker	March 73A Chevrolet		4
28	Chris Featherstone	McRae GM1 Chevrolet		2
29	Brendan McInerney	Lola T330 Chevrolet	Trevor Twaites	2
30	Tony Trimmer	Lola T330 Chevrolet	ShellSPORT Luxembourg	1
