= 1974 SCCA/USAC Formula 5000 Championship =

Eight running of America's premier open wheel racing series' Sports Car Club

Seasons
- ← 1973 1975 →

The 1974 SCCA/USAC Formula 5000 Championship was the eighth running of the Sports Car Club of America's premier open wheel racing series. It was the first to be sanctioned jointly by the Sports Car Club of America (SCCA) and the United States Auto Club (USAC), and the first to be held under the "SCCA /USAC Formula 5000 Championship" name. Sponsorship by the L&M cigarette brand was not carried forward from the 1973 championship.

The championship was open to SCCA Formula 5000 cars and, for the first time, to USAC cars powered by 161 cid turbocharged, 255 cid double overhead camshaft or 305 cid "stock block" engines. It was won by Brian Redman driving a Lola T332 Chevrolet.

== Race calendar ==
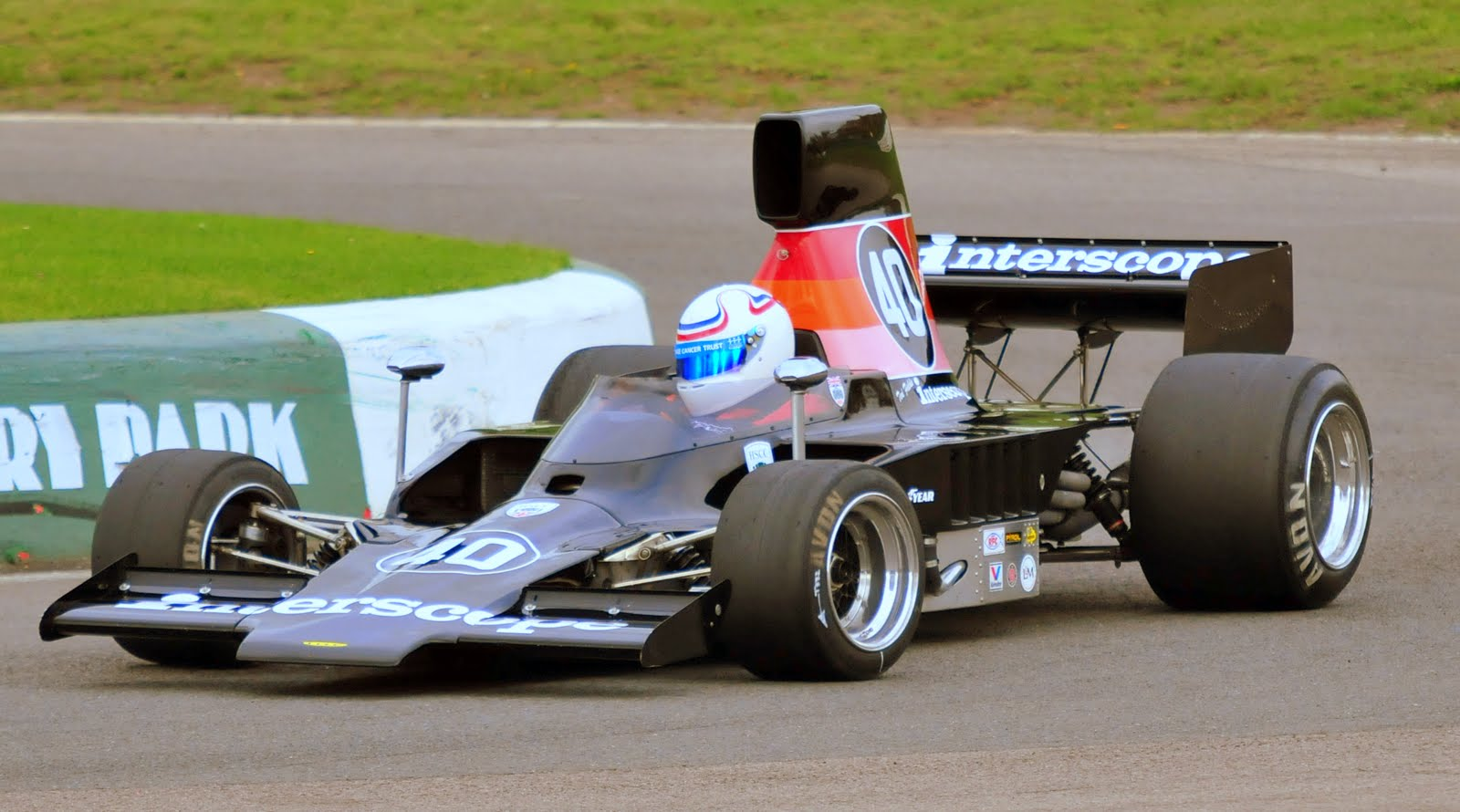
Brian Redman won the championship driving a Lola T332, similar to that pictured above

The championship was contested over seven races.

| Race | Date | Name | Circuit | Race distance | Winning driver | Winning car |
|---|---|---|---|---|---|---|
| 1 | June 2 | | Mid-Ohio Sports Car Course | 42 laps | (United Kingdom) Brian Redman | Lola T332 – Chevrolet V8 |
| 2 | June 15 | | Mosport Park | 40 laps | (United Kingdom) David Hobbs | Lola T332 – Chevrolet V8 |
| 3 | July 14 | | Watkins Glen International | 30 laps | (United States) Mario Andretti | Lola T332 – Chevrolet V8 |
| 4 | July 28 | | Road America | 25 laps | (United States) Mario Andretti | Lola T332 – Chevrolet V8 |
| 5 | September 1 | California Grand Prix | Ontario Motor Speedway | 34 laps | (United Kingdom) Brian Redman | Lola T332 – Chevrolet V8 |
| 6 | October 13 | Monterey Grand Prix | Laguna Seca Raceway | 50 laps | (United Kingdom) Brian Redman | Lola T332 – Chevrolet V8 |
| 7 | October 27 | Riverside Grand Prix | Riverside International Raceway | 40 laps | (United States) Mario Andretti | Lola T332 – Chevrolet V8 |

== Points system ==
Championship points were awarded on a 20-15-12-10-8-6-4-3-2-1 basis for the first ten positions at each race.

== Championship standings ==
| Position | Driver | Car | Points |
|---|---|---|---|
| 1 | (United Kingdom) Brian Redman | Lola T332 Chevrolet | 105 |
| 2 | (United States) Mario Andretti | Lola T332 Chevrolet | 97 |
| 3 | (United Kingdom) David Hobbs | Lola T332 Chevrolet | 55 |
| 4 | (Canada) Eppie Wietzes | Lola T332 Chevrolet | 49 |
| 5 | (United States) Brett Lunger | Eagle Chevrolet | 33 |
| 6 | (United States) John Gunn | March 73A Chevrolet; Lola T332 Chevrolet | 27 |
| 7 | (Australia) Warwick Brown | Lola T332 Chevrolet | 20 |
| 8 | (New Zealand) Graham McRae | Talon MR1 Chevrolet; Lola T332 Chevrolet; McRae GM2 Chevrolet | 19 |
| 9 | (United States) Evan Noyes | Lola T332 Chevrolet | 18 |
| 10 | (United States) Tuck Thomas | Lola T332 Chevrolet | 16 |
| 11 | (United Kingdom) James Hunt | Lola T332 Chevrolet; Eagle Chevrolet | 15 |
| 12 | (United States) Jon Woodner | Talon MR1 Chevrolet | 15 |
| 13 | (United States) Mike Mosley | Lola T332 Chevrolet | 11 |
| 14 | (United States) Al Unser | Lola T330 Chevrolet | 10 |
| 15 | (Canada) Horst Kroll | Lola T300 Chevrolet | 10 |
| 16 | (United States) Sam Posey | Talon MR1 Chevrolet | 9 |
| 17 | (United States) Tony Settember | Lola T330 Chevrolet | 9 |
| 18 | (United States) Roger Bighouse | Chevron B24 Chevrolet | 8 |
| 19 | (Argentina) Nestor García-Veiga | Eagle Chevrolet; Lola T330 Chevrolet | 6 |
| = | (United States) Jerry Grant | Lola T332 Chevrolet | 6 |
| 21 | (United States) Jim Hawes | Lola T330 Chevrolet | 5 |
| 22 | (United States) Bill Tempero | March 73A Chevrolet | 4 |
| = | (United States) John Morton | Lola T332 Chevrolet; Eagle Chevrolet | 4 |
| 24 | (United States) Gus Hutchison | March 74A Chevrolet | 4 |
| 25 | (United States) Johnny Rutherford | Lola T330 Chevrolet | 4 |
| 26 | (United States) Tom Jones | McLaren M22 Chevrolet | 3 |
| 27 | (United States) James Dunkel | Chevron B24 Chevrolet | 2 |
| = | (Italy) Lella Lombardi | Eagle Chevrolet; Lola T332 Chevrolet | 2 |
| 29 | (United States) Dan Furey | Lola T192 Chevrolet; Lola T332 AMC | 1 |
