= 1972 SCCA L&M Continental 5000 Championship =

Seasons
- ← 1971 1973 →

The 1972 SCCA L&M Continental 5000 Championship was the Sports Car Club of America's sixth annual professional open-wheel auto racing series. It was open to Formula 5000 cars, these being Formula SCCA Class A open-wheel, single-seat cars with 5000cc restricted design engines or 3000cc unrestricted design engines. The championship was won by New Zealand driver Graham McRae.

== Race schedule ==
The championship was contested over eight races with two heats per race.

Race	Date	Race Name	Circuit	Race winner	Car
1	May 7	Monterey Grand Prix	Laguna Seca Raceway	(New Zealand) Graham McRae	Leda GM1 - Chevrolet V8
2	June 4	Lucerne 100	Edmonton International Speedway	(United Kingdom) David Hobbs	Lola T300 - Chevrolet V8
3	June 18	Watkins Glen Grand Prix	Watkins Glen International	(New Zealand) Graham McRae	Leda GM1 - Chevrolet V8
4	July 16	Road America Grand Prix	Road America	(New Zealand) Graham McRae	Leda GM1 - Chevrolet V8
5	July 30	Minnesota Grand Prix	Donnybrooke	(Canada) Eppie Wietzes	Lola T300 - Chevrolet V8
6	August 20	Road Atlanta Grand Prix	Road Atlanta	(United States) Brett Lunger	Lola T300 - Chevrolet V8
7	September 4	Lime Rock Grand Prix	Lime Rock Park	(United States) Brett Lunger	Lola T300 - Chevrolet V8
8	September 24	Riverside Grand Prix	Riverside International Raceway	(United Kingdom) Brian Redman	Chevron B24 - Chevrolet V8

== Points system ==
Championship points were awarded to drivers on a 20-15-12-10-8-6-4-3-2-1 basis for the first ten places in each race, those places having been determined from the results of the two heats. Total points for each driver were based on the best six finishes.

== Championship standings ==
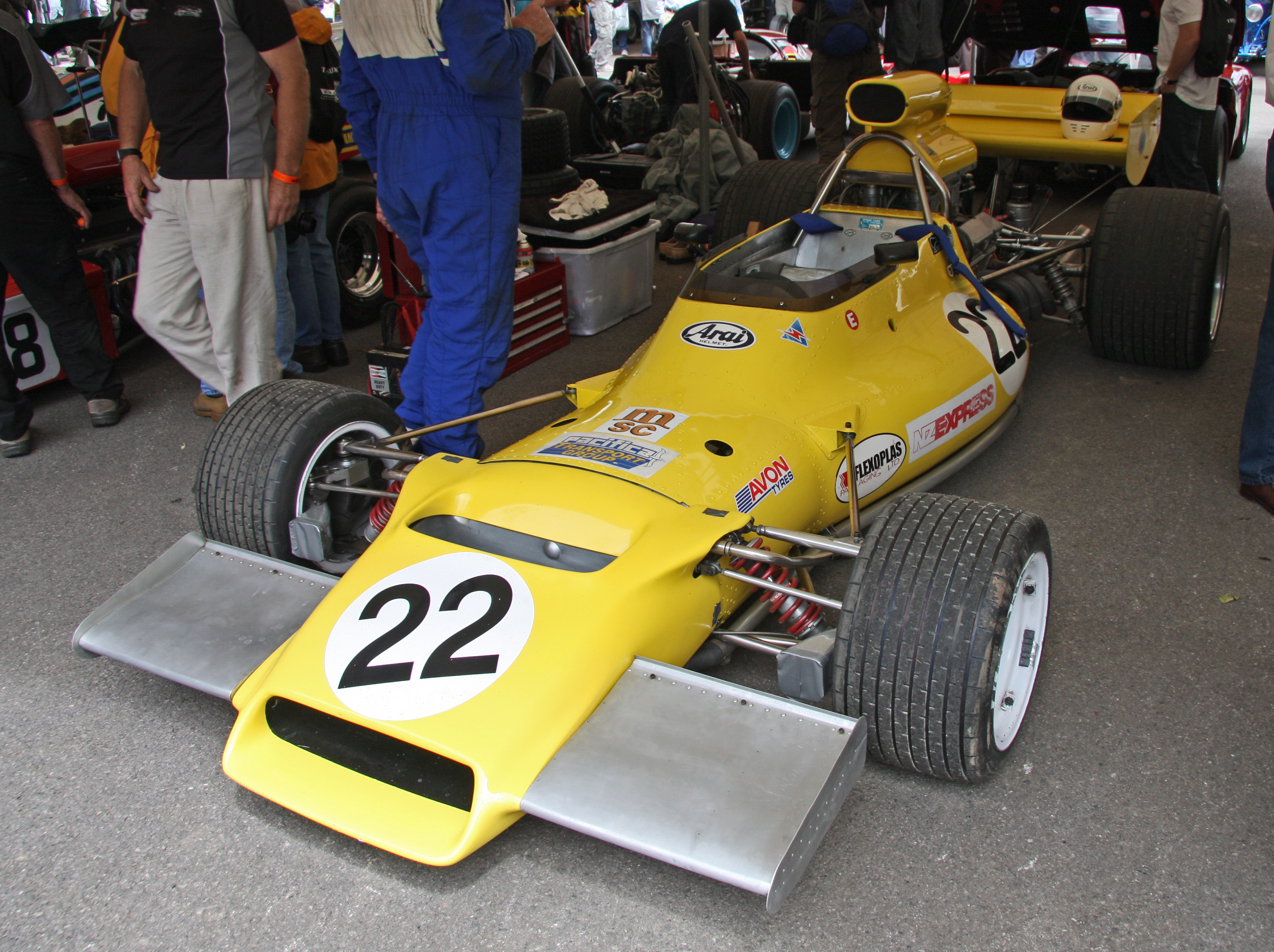
Graham McRae won the 1972 L&M Continental 5000 Championship driving a Leda GM1 and a McRae GM1 (similar to that pictured above)

Position	Driver	Car	Points
1	(New Zealand) Graham McRae	Leda GM1 Chevrolet & McRae GM1 Chevrolet	87
2	(United States) Sam Posey	Surtees TS11 Chevrolet	69
3	(United States) Brett Lunger	Lola T300 Chevrolet	60
4	(United Kingdom) Brian Redman	Chevron B24 Chevrolet	60
5	(Canada) Eppie Wietzes	Lola T300 Chevrolet	47
6	(United States) Skip Barber	March 711 Ford Cosworth DFV	44
7	(United States) Lothar Motschenbacher	McLaren M18 Chevrolet	32
8	(United Kingdom) David Hobbs	Lola T300 Chevrolet	31
9	(Australia) Bob Muir	Lola T300 Chevrolet	22
10	(United States) Jerry Hansen	Lola T300 Chevrolet	21
11	(United States) Gus Hutchison	Lola T300 Chevrolet	18
12	(United States) John Gunn	Lola T300 Chevrolet	16
13	(United States) Allan Lader	McLaren M18 Chevrolet	15
14	(United Kingdom) Derek Bell	McLaren M10B Chevrolet	15
15	(United States) John Morton	Lotus 70B Ford	14
16	(United States) Rocky Moran	Surtees TS8B Chevrolet	13
17	(United States) Sandy Shepard	Lola T300 Pontiac	12
18	(Australia) Kevin Bartlett	McLaren M10B Chevrolet & Lola T300 Chevrolet	11
19	(United Kingdom) Peter Gethin	Chevron B24 Chevrolet	10
=	(United States) Horst Kwech	Lola T300 Chevrolet	10
21	(United States) Evan Noyes	Leda LT27 Chevrolet & Leda GM1 Chevrolet	8
=	(United States) Warren Flickinger	Lola T300 Chevrolet	8
23	(Canada) Horst Kroll	Lola T300 Chevrolet	7
=	(Canada) John Cannon	March 725 Oldsmobile & McLaren M10B Chevrolet	7
25	(Australia) Colin Hyams	Lola T192 Chevrolet	3
=	(United States) George Follmer	Matich A50 Ford & Lotus 70B Ford	3
27	(United States) Ed Felter	Lola T192 Chevrolet	1
=	(United States) Dave Jordan	Eagle Chevrolet	1
