= SCCA Continental Championship =

- Category: Formula 5000; Formula B Formula C USAC Championship Division
- Country: United States
- Inaugural season: 1967
- Folded: 1976
- Last Drivers' champion: (United Kingdom) Brian Redman

The SCCA Continental Championship was an annual, professional, open-wheel motor racing series organized by the Sports Car Club of America (SCCA), under various names, from 1967 to 1976.

== History ==
The inaugural series was staged in 1967 as the SCCA Grand Prix Championship. It was open to the SCCA's existing Formula A, Formula B and Formula C cars, which were restricted to maximum engine capacities of 3 liters, 1.6 liters and 1.1 liters respectively. For 1968, the SCCA amended their Formula A regulations to allow the use of production-based V8 engines, restricted to a 5-liter maximum engine capacity, in addition to the existing 3 liter engines.

For 1969 the series was renamed to the SCCA Continental Championship, with the Formula A cars now contesting a separate feature race at each championship event and the Formula B & C cars competing in their own race for separate points. The championship received substantial sponsorship from L&M Cigarettes for 1970. Increased support from L&M saw the championship renamed to become the SCCA L&M Continental 5000 Championship for 1971, the 5000 component of the name chosen to give the 5 liter formula greater international recognition. As of 1972, the Formula A regulations still permitted both 5000cc restricted and 3000cc unrestricted engines. Sponsorship by the L&M cigarette brand was not carried forward from the 1973 championship.

An agreement was reached between the SCCA and the United States Auto Club (USAC) to jointly sanction the championship from 1974. The championship was renamed to the SCCA/USAC Formula 5000 Championship and was now open to both SCCA Formula 5000 cars and USAC Championship Division cars. The latter could be powered by supercharged engines of up to 2650cc, non- supercharged overhead camshaft engines of up to 4,200cc or production, non- supercharged, non-overhead camshaft engines of up to 5,250cc.

During 1976 USAC announced their intention to withdraw from the co-sanctioning arrangement at the end of the year. The SCCA proposed to stage a ten race championship in 1977 but subsequently decided to replace the Formula 5000 Championship with a revived Can Am Series. Regulations permitted the existing Formula 5000 cars, with fully enveloping bodywork, to compete in the new series.

== Results ==
Year	Championship name	Winning driver	Car
1967	SCCA Grand Prix Championship	(United States) Gus Hutchison	Lotus 41 Ford
1968	SCCA Grand Prix Championship	(United States) Lou Sell	Eagle Mk 5 Chevrolet
1969	SCCA Continental Championship	(United States) Tony Adamowicz	Eagle Mk 5 Chevrolet
1970	SCCA Continental Championship	(Canada) John Cannon	McLaren M10B Chevrolet
1971	SCCA L&M Continental 5000 Championship	(United Kingdom) David Hobbs	McLaren M10B Chevrolet
1972	SCCA L&M Continental 5000 Championship	(New Zealand) Graham McRae	Leda GM1 Chevrolet & McRae GM1 Chevrolet
1973	SCCA L&M Continental 5000 Championship	(South Africa) Jody Scheckter	Trojan T101 Chevrolet & Lola T330 Chevrolet
1974	SCCA/USAC Formula 5000 Championship	(United Kingdom) Brian Redman	Lola T332 Chevrolet
1975	SCCA/USAC Formula 5000 Championship	(United Kingdom) Brian Redman	Lola T332 Chevrolet & Lola T400 Chevrolet
1976	SCCA/USAC Formula 5000 Championship	(United Kingdom) Brian Redman	Lola T332C Chevrolet
