= March 74A =

- Category: Formula 5000
- Constructor: March
- Predecessor: March 73A

Technical specifications
- Chassis: Aluminium monocoque with load-bearing engine-transmission assembly, fiberglass and aluminum body
- Suspension (front): Independent, wishbones and inclined coil spring/shock absorber units
- Suspension (rear): Independent, single top link, twin tower links and coil spring/shock absorber units
- Engine: Mid-engine, longitudinally mounted, 5.0 L (305.1 cu in), Chevrolet, 90° V8, NA
- Transmission: Hewland 5-speed manual
- Weight: 1,500 lb (680 kg)

Competition history
- Notable drivers: (United Kingdom) Mike Wilds (United Kingdom) Ian Taylor (United States) Gus Hutchison
- Debut: 1974

The March 74A was an open-wheel formula racing car, designed, developed, and built by British manufacturer and constructor, March Engineering, for Formula 5000 racing, in 1974. It competed in both the European and U.S. F5000 championships. It did also compete in three non-championship Formula One World Championship Grand Prix in 1974, being driven by Mike Wilds and Ian Taylor.
