= March 72A =

Formula 5000 racing car

March 72A (722A/725)
- Category: Formula 5000
- Constructor: March
- Successor: March 73A

Technical specifications
- Chassis: Aluminium monocoque with load-bearing engine-transmission assembly, fiberglass and aluminum body
- Suspension (front): Independent, wishbones and inclined coil spring/shock absorber units
- Suspension (rear): Independent, single top link, twin tower links and coil spring/shock absorber units
- Engine: Mid-engine, longitudinally mounted, 5.0 L (305.1 cu in), Chevrolet, 90° V8, NA
- Transmission: Hewland 5-speed manual
- Weight: 1,500 lb (680 kg)

Competition history
- Notable drivers: (Canada) John Cannon
- Debut: 1972

The March 72A, also designated as the March 722A, and also known as the March 725, was an open-wheel formula racing car, designed, developed, and built by British manufacturer and constructor, March Engineering, for Formula 5000 racing, in 1972. It competed in both the European and SCCA U.S. F5000 championships, being driven by Canadian John Cannon. It was itself based on a March 722 Formula Two chassis, and was powered by a powerful 5.0 L (310 cu in) Oldsmobile V8 engine.
