= 1967 SCCA Grand Prix Championship =

1967 SCCA Continental Championship season

Seasons
- ← none 1968 →

The 1967 SCCA Grand Prix Championship season was the inaugural season of the Sports Car Club of America's championship series for open-wheel, single-seat formula cars, later to be known as the SCCA Continental Championship. The 1967 championship was open to SCCA Formula A, Formula B and Formula C cars, which were limited to a maximum engine displacement of 3.0 liters, 1.6 liters and 1.1 liters respectively.

In June 1967 the SCCA decreed that, from 1 January 1968, cars powered by production-based engines of up to 5 litre (305 cubic inch) displacement would be eligible to compete in Formula A and thus for the championship.

== Race results ==
The 1967 SCCA Grand Prix Championship was contested over a five race series.

Round	Date	Event	Racetrack	Distance	Formula A winner Formula A vehicle	Formula B winner Formula B vehicle	Formula C winner Formula C vehicle
1	May 14	Colorado Grand Prix	Continental Divide	36 laps	Harry McIntosh Brabham BT7 - Climax FWMV V8	Gus Hutchison Lotus 41C - Ford twin cam BRM	Jim Mulhall Lola Mk3 - Ford
2	May 20	Bridgehampton Continental Race	Bridgehampton Race Circuit	35 laps	Jim Haynes Lotus 18/21 - Climax FPF 4	Gus Hutchison Lotus 41C - Ford twin cam BRM	Fred Hummel LeGrand Mk 3
3	June 25	War Bonnet Continental Race	War Bonnet	50 laps		Gus Hutchison Lotus 41C - Ford twin cam BRM	Wayne T Mitchell Lotus 22 - Ford
4	September 17	St Jovite Grand Prix	Mont-Tremblant	40 laps	Guy Wooley Cooper - Climax FPF 4	Fred Ashplant Brabham BT21 - Ford twin cam	Ronald Stanwicks Cooper FJ Mk 3A - Ford
5	October 1	Lake Tahoe Continental Race	Lake Tahoe	35 laps	Jack Millikan Lotus 22 - Oldsmobile	Gus Hutchison Lotus 41C - Ford twin cam BRM	Ray Seher Lotus 20

== Points system ==
Championship points were awarded to drivers on a 9-6-4-3-2-1 basis.

== Championship results ==
The top ten placed drivers in the 1967 championship were as follows:

Position	Driver	Car	Points
1	(United States) Gus Hutchison	Lotus 41 Ford	36
2	(United States) Mike Hiss	Brabham BT21 Ford	12
=	(United States) Karl Knapp	LeGrand Ford	12
=	(United States) Lou Sell	Brabham BT21A Ford	12
5	(United States) Bob McQueen	LeGrand Ford	10
6	(United States) Fred Ashplant	Brabham BT21 Ford	9
7	(United States) Mike Cronin	Lotus 22 Ford	7
8	(United States) Harold Krech	Lotus 41 Ford	6
9	(United States) Roger Barr	Crossle Ford	4
10	(Canada) Peter Broeker	Stebro Mk4 Ford	3
=	(United States) Steve Griswold	LeGrand Alfa Romeo	3
=	(United States) Bill Gubelmann	Brabham Ford	3
