= 1974 Spanish Grand Prix =

Race details
- Date: 28 April 1974
- Official name: XX Gran Premio de España
- Location: Jarama, Spain
- Course: Permanent racing facility
- Course length: 3.404 km (2.115 miles)
- Distance: 84 laps, 285.936 km (177.672 miles)
- Scheduled distance: 90 laps, 306.36 km (190.363 miles)

Pole position
| Driver | (Austria) Niki Lauda | Ferrari |
- Time: 1:18.44

Fastest lap
| Driver | (Austria) Niki Lauda | Ferrari |
- Time: 1:20.83 on lap 47

Podium
| First | (Austria) Niki Lauda | Ferrari |
| Second | (Switzerland) Clay Regazzoni | Ferrari |
| Third | (Brazil) Emerson Fittipaldi | McLaren-Ford |

The 1974 Spanish Grand Prix was a Formula One motor race held on 28 April 1974 at the Circuito Permanente del Jarama near Madrid, Spain. It was race 4 of 15 in both the 1974 World Championship of Drivers and the 1974 International Cup for Formula One Manufacturers.

The 84-lap race was won from pole position by Austrian driver Niki Lauda, driving a Ferrari. It was Lauda's first of 25 Formula One victories. Swiss teammate Clay Regazzoni finished second, with Brazilian Emerson Fittipaldi third in a McLaren-Ford.

== Race summary ==
With James Hunt's Hesketh having won the non-championship International Trophy three weeks previously, the 1974 season was turning out to be one of the most open ever, with five drivers from four teams having won the first five races (also including the non-championship Race of Champions), and a driver who had not won at all - Clay Regazzoni - leading the Drivers' Championship.

The Spanish Grand Prix marked the debuts of the Trojan and Amon teams, as well as Liechtensteiner driver Rikky von Opel. Jorge de Bagration, a local driver of Georgian royal descent, was to have taken part in the race, driving a Surtees TS16 with sponsorship from department store El Corte Inglés, but missed out due to a very unusual set of circumstances: the outgoing president of the Spanish Motor Sport Federation cleared his office, taking with him all paper files including the official entry list for the race; a replacement list was hurriedly drawn up that omitted de Bagration, whose sponsorship had just fallen through. Despite this, de Bagration should still have been included on the replacement list, regardless whether or not he would have been able to race.

Niki Lauda took pole from Ronnie Peterson in a qualifying session disrupted by a large accident to Patrick Depailler, but it was Peterson who led from the start as rain began to fall. Jacky Ickx moved into the podium places, taking 3rd place on lap 19.

As the track dried, cars dived into the pits for replacement tyres. Ferrari got Lauda in and out for a total pit stop time of 35 seconds, enabling him to take the lead. The race ended at the two-hour mark, six laps short of the scheduled 90, with Lauda leading Regazzoni home in a Ferrari 1-2 and no other driver on the lead lap. Arturo Merzario lost out on a solid points finish when the hit the wall in 4th. Emerson Fittipaldi held off a strong challenge from Hans-Joachim Stuck, whilst Jody Scheckter claimed his first points.

== Classification ==
=== Qualifying ===
| Pos | No | Driver | Constructor | Time | Gap |
|---|---|---|---|---|---|
| 1 | 12 | (Austria) Niki Lauda | Ferrari | 1:18.44 | |
| 2 | 1 | (Sweden) Ronnie Peterson | Lotus-Ford | 1:18.47 | +0.03 |
| 3 | 11 | (Switzerland) Clay Regazzoni | Ferrari | 1:19.25 | +0.81 |
| 4 | 5 | (Brazil) Emerson Fittipaldi | McLaren-Ford | 1:19.28 | +0.84 |
| 5 | 2 | (Belgium) Jacky Ickx | Lotus-Ford | 1:19.28 | +0.84 |
| 6 | 7 | (Argentina) Carlos Reutemann | Brabham-Ford | 1:19.37 | +0.93 |
| 7 | 20 | (Italy) Arturo Merzario | Iso-Marlboro-Ford | 1:19.54 | +1.10 |
| 8 | 56 | (New Zealand) Denny Hulme | McLaren-Ford | 1:19.66 | +1.22 |
| 9 | 10 | (Italy) Vittorio Brambilla | March-Ford | 1:19.81 | +1.37 |
| 10 | 3 | (South Africa) Jody Scheckter | Tyrrell-Ford | 1:19.86 | +1.42 |
| 11 | 24 | (United Kingdom) James Hunt | Hesketh-Ford | 1:19.87 | +1.43 |
| 12 | 14 | (France) Jean-Pierre Beltoise | BRM | 1:20.03 | +1.59 |
| 13 | 17 | (France) Jean-Pierre Jarier | Shadow-Ford | 1:20.20 | +1.76 |
| 14 | 9 | (West Germany) Hans-Joachim Stuck | March-Ford | 1:20.46 | +2.02 |
| 15 | 18 | (Brazil) Carlos Pace | Surtees-Ford | 1:20.52 | +2.08 |
| 16 | 28 | (United Kingdom) John Watson | Brabham-Ford | 1:20.52 | +2.08 |
| 17 | 4 | (France) Patrick Depailler | Tyrrell-Ford | 1:20.65 | +2.21 |
| 18 | 33 | (United Kingdom) Mike Hailwood | McLaren-Ford | 1:20.65 | +2.21 |
| 19 | 19 | (West Germany) Jochen Mass | Surtees-Ford | 1:20.80 | +2.36 |
| 20 | 26 | (United Kingdom) Graham Hill | Lola-Ford | 1:20.99 | +2.55 |
| 21 | 15 | (France) Henri Pescarolo | BRM | 1:21.32 | +2.88 |
| 22 | 16 | (United Kingdom) Brian Redman | Shadow-Ford | 1:21.35 | +2.91 |
| 23 | 37 | (France) François Migault | BRM | 1:21.43 | +2.99 |
| 24 | 30 | (New Zealand) Chris Amon | Amon-Ford | 1:21.79 | +3.35 |
| 25 | 8 | (Liechtenstein) Rikky von Opel | Brabham-Ford | 1:21.85 | +3.41 |
| 26 | 23 | (Australia) Tim Schenken | Trojan-Ford | 1:21.89 | +3.45 |
| DNQ | 27 | (United Kingdom) Guy Edwards | Lola-Ford | 1:21.96 | +3.52 |
| DNQ | 21 | (Denmark) Tom Belsø | Iso-Marlboro-Ford | 1:22.09 | +3.65 |

=== Race ===
| Pos | No | Driver | Constructor | Laps | Time/Retired | Grid | Points |
|---|---|---|---|---|---|---|---|
| 1 | 12 | (Austria) Niki Lauda | Ferrari | 84 | 2:00:29.56 | 1 | 9 |
| 2 | 11 | (Switzerland) Clay Regazzoni | Ferrari | 84 | + 35.61 | 3 | 6 |
| 3 | 5 | (Brazil) Emerson Fittipaldi | McLaren-Ford | 83 | + 1 Lap | 4 | 4 |
| 4 | 9 | (West Germany) Hans-Joachim Stuck | March-Ford | 82 | + 2 Laps | 13 | 3 |
| 5 | 3 | (South Africa) Jody Scheckter | Tyrrell-Ford | 82 | + 2 Laps | 9 | 2 |
| 6 | 56 | (New Zealand) Denny Hulme | McLaren-Ford | 82 | + 2 Laps | 8 | 1 |
| 7 | 16 | (United Kingdom) Brian Redman | Shadow-Ford | 81 | + 3 Laps | 21 | |
| 8 | 4 | (France) Patrick Depailler | Tyrrell-Ford | 81 | + 3 Laps | 16 | |
| 9 | 33 | (United Kingdom) Mike Hailwood | McLaren-Ford | 81 | + 3 Laps | 17 | |
| 10 | 24 | (United Kingdom) James Hunt | Hesketh-Ford | 81 | + 3 Laps | 10 | |
| 11 | 28 | (United Kingdom) John Watson | Brabham-Ford | 80 | + 4 Laps | 15 | |
| 12 | 15 | (France) Henri Pescarolo | BRM | 80 | + 4 Laps | 20 | |
| 13 | 18 | (Brazil) Carlos Pace | Surtees-Ford | 78 | + 6 Laps | 14 | |
| 14 | 23 | (Australia) Tim Schenken | Trojan-Ford | 76 | Spun Off | 25 | |
| NC | 17 | (France) Jean-Pierre Jarier | Shadow-Ford | 73 | + 11 Laps | 12 | |
| Ret | 26 | (United Kingdom) Graham Hill | Lola-Ford | 43 | Engine | 19 | |
| Ret | 20 | (Italy) Arturo Merzario | Iso-Marlboro-Ford | 37 | Accident | 7 | |
| Ret | 19 | (West Germany) Jochen Mass | Surtees-Ford | 35 | Gearbox | 18 | |
| Ret | 37 | (France) François Migault | BRM | 27 | Engine | 22 | |
| Ret | 2 | (Belgium) Jacky Ickx | Lotus-Ford | 26 | Brakes | 5 | |
| Ret | 1 | (Sweden) Ronnie Peterson | Lotus-Ford | 23 | Engine | 2 | |
| Ret | 30 | (New Zealand) Chris Amon | Amon-Ford | 22 | Brakes | 23 | |
| Ret | 8 | (Liechtenstein) Rikky von Opel | Brabham-Ford | 14 | Oil Leak | 24 | |
| Ret | 7 | (Argentina) Carlos Reutemann | Brabham-Ford | 12 | Spun Off | 6 | |
| Ret | 14 | (France) Jean-Pierre Beltoise | BRM | 2 | Engine | 11 | |
| DNS | 10 | (Italy) Vittorio Brambilla | March-Ford | | Accident | | |
| DNQ | 27 | (United Kingdom) Guy Edwards | Lola-Ford | | | | |
| DNQ | 21 | (Denmark) Tom Belsø | Iso-Marlboro-Ford | | | | |
| WD | 25 | (Switzerland) Silvio Moser | Brabham-Ford | | | | |
| WD | 29 | (Spain) Jorge de Bagration | Surtees-Ford | | | | |

== Notes ==
- This was the Formula One World Championship debut for British constructor Trojan and New Zealand constructor Amon. Amon also was the first constructor from New Zealand.
- This was the 50th Grand Prix win for a Ferrari and a Ferrari-powered car.
- For the first time since the 1972 German Grand Prix, a Grand Prix was not won by a Ford-powered car. It ended a record streak of 22 consecutive Grand Prix wins for the British-American engine supplier.

== Championship standings after the race ==
Drivers' Championship standings

| | Pos | Driver | Points |
|---|---|---|---|
| | 1 | (Switzerland) Clay Regazzoni | 16 |
| 5 | 2 | (Austria) Niki Lauda | 15 |
| | 3 | (Brazil) Emerson Fittipaldi | 13 |
| | 4 | (New Zealand) Denny Hulme | 10 |
| 3 | 5 | (Argentina) Carlos Reutemann | 9 |

Constructors' Championship standings

| | Pos | Constructor | Points |
|---|---|---|---|
| | 1 | (United Kingdom) McLaren-Ford | 26 |
| | 2 | (Italy) Ferrari | 21 |
| | 3 | (United Kingdom) Brabham-Ford | 9 |
| | 4 | (United Kingdom) BRM | 8 |
| 1 | 5 | (United Kingdom) Tyrrell-Ford | 6 |

- Note: Only the top five positions are included for both sets of standings.

| Previous race: 1974 South African Grand Prix | FIA Formula One World Championship; 1974 season | Next race: 1974 Belgian Grand Prix |
| Previous race: 1973 Spanish Grand Prix | Spanish Grand Prix | Next race: 1975 Spanish Grand Prix |
