= March 76A =

- Category: Formula 5000
- Constructor: March
- Predecessor: March 75A

Technical specifications
- Chassis: Aluminium monocoque with load-bearing engine-transmission assembly, fiberglass and aluminum body
- Suspension (front): Independent, wishbones and inclined coil spring/shock absorber units
- Suspension (rear): Independent, single top link, twin tower links and coil spring/shock absorber units
- Engine: Mid-engine, longitudinally mounted, 5.0 L (305.1 cu in), Chevrolet, 90° V8, NA
- Transmission: Hewland 5-speed manual
- Weight: 1,500 lb (680 kg)

Competition history
- Notable drivers: (Australia) Alan Jones
- Debut: 1976

The March 76A was an open-wheel formula racing car, designed, developed and built by British manufacturer and constructor, March Engineering, for Formula 5000 racing, in 1976. It won a single race in 1976, with Alan Jones at Watkins Glen. It was powered by the commonly used Chevrolet small-block engine. After its Formula 5000 career and use, it was converted into a closed-wheel sports prototype, where it was used in the revived Can-Am series. Its best result was a 5th-place finish.
