= 1976 SCCA/USAC Formula 5000 Championship =

1976 SCCA/USAC Formula 5000 Championship season

Seasons
- ← 1975 none →

The 1976 SCCA/USAC Formula 5000 Championship was the tenth running of the SCCA Continental Championship open wheel racing series, and the third to be co-sanctioned by the Sports Car Club of America (SCCA) and the United States Auto Club (USAC).

The championship was won by Brian Redman driving a Lola T332 Chevrolet. It was Redman's third consecutive SCCA/USAC Formula 5000 Championship title win. For the first time in three years, a vehicle other than a Lola won a race, with March and Shadow winning one race each. 1976 also marked the first race win by a non-Chevrolet powered car since the 1971 season, with a Dodge-powered Shadow winning at Road America.

1976 was to be the final year of the SCCA/USAC Formula 5000 Championship as the SCCA replaced it with a revived Can Am Series for 1977. The rules for the new series were to allow the Formula 5000 cars to compete with fully enveloping bodywork.

== Race results ==
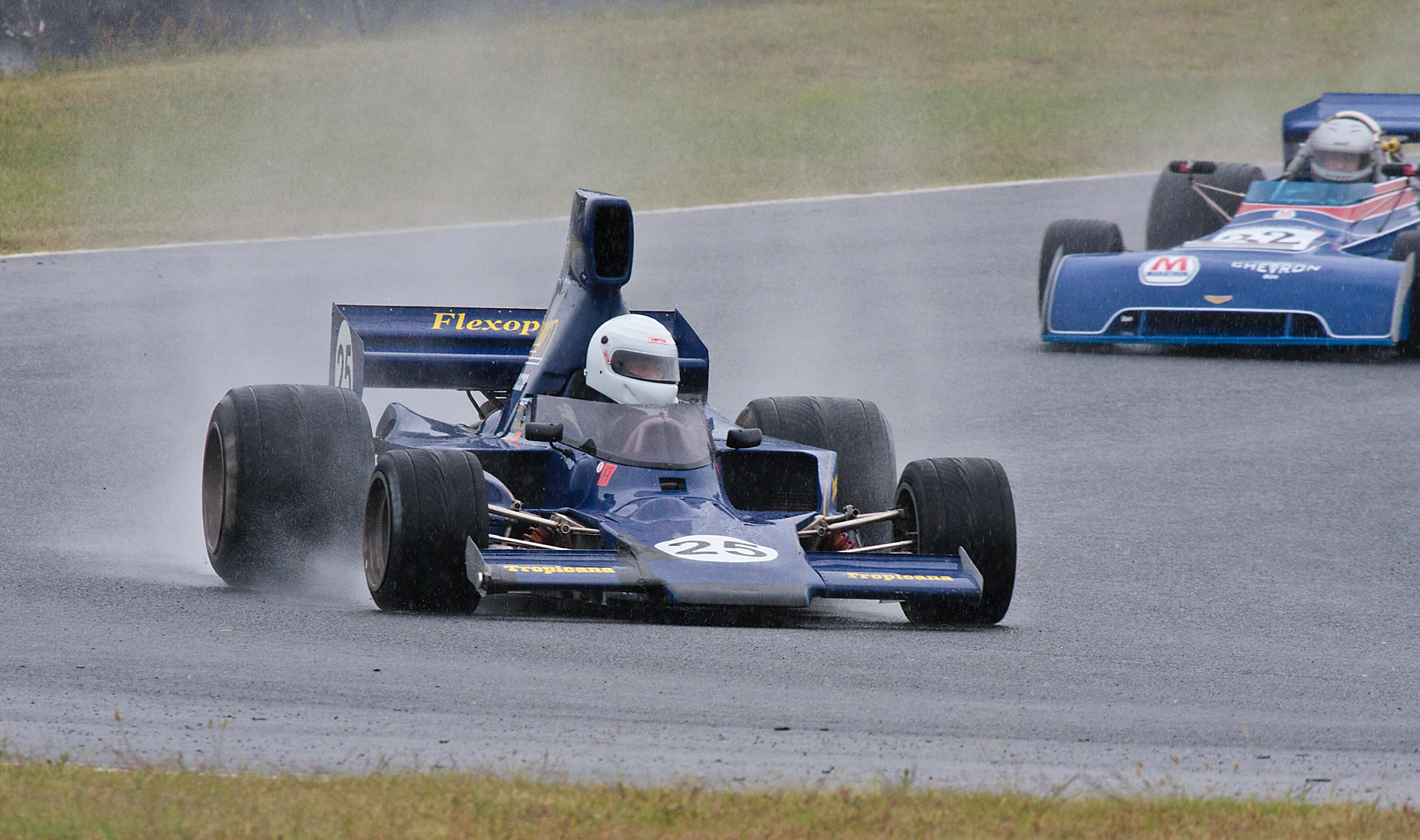
Brian Redman won the championship driving a Lola T332C similar to that pictured above

The championship was contested over a seven race series.

Race	Date	Location	Distance	Winning driver	Winning car
1	May 9	Pocono International Raceway	35 laps	(United Kingdom) Brian Redman	Lola T332C – Chevrolet V8
2	June 20	Mosport Park	40 laps	(Australia) Alan Jones	Lola T332 – Chevrolet V8
3	July 11	Watkins Glen International	30 laps	(Australia) Alan Jones	March 76A – Chevrolet V8
4	July 25	Road America	25 laps	(United Kingdom) Jackie Oliver	Shadow DN6B – Dodge V8
5	August 8	Mid-Ohio Sports Car Course	42 laps	(United Kingdom) Brian Redman	Lola T332C – Chevrolet V8
6	August 28	Road America	20 laps	(United Kingdom) Brian Redman	Lola T332C – Chevrolet V8
7	October 17	Riverside International Raceway	40 laps	(United States) Al Unser	Lola T332 – Chevrolet V8

== Points system ==
Championship points were awarded on a 36-24-16-12-8-5-4-3-2-1 basis for the first ten positions in each race.

== Final points standings ==
Pos	Driver	POC	MOS	WGL	ROA1	MOH	ROA2	RIV	Pts
1	(United Kingdom) Brian Redman	1	8	6	14	1	1	3	132
2	(United States) Al Unser			2	2	4	3	1	112
3	(United Kingdom) Jackie Oliver	14	2	13	1	2	25	2	108
4	(Australia) Alan Jones	7	1	1	5	DNS		4	96
5	(United States) Danny Ongais	2	4	9	16	3	2	11	78
6	(Australia) Vern Schuppan	3	6	16	3	20	20	5	45
7	(New Zealand) Warwick Brown	16	5	3	4		17	6	41
8	(United Kingdom) Peter Gethin	18	19	7	9	7	4	10	37
9	(Belgium) Teddy Pilette	12	3	18	6	5	5	12	23
10	(United States) Randy Lewis	4	7	12	20	8	10	Wth	20
11	(United States) Brett Lunger			4	10	6	26	15	18
12	(Canada) Horst Kroll	8	13	5	12	14	13		11
13	(United States) Skeeter McKitterick	6		11	21	Wth	7	17	9
14	(United States) Sam Posey	5	20						8
15	(Canada) John Cannon	15		21			6	8	8
16	(United States) Bob Lazier		9		7	10		18	7
17	(United States) Arlon Koops		17	8	11		9		5
18	(United States) Evan Noyes	13		DNS	22	11	28	7	4
19	(United States) John David Briggs		10	19	DNS	12	8	16	4
20	(United States) Tuck Thomas		11		8	DNS			3
21	(United States) John Benton	9	12	Wth		13	21	DNQ	2
22	(United States) Richard Shirey		16		Wth	9	24		2
23	(France) Patrick Tambay							9	2
24	(Australia) Bruce Allison	10		Wth	Wth				1
25	(United States) Bob Nagel	17	15	10	17	18	12		1
	(United States) Geoff Davie	11	18			17	18		0
	(United States) Jim Sechser				19		11		0
	(United States) Doug Schulz				13		14		0
	(United States) John Korn							13	0
	(Canada) Eppie Wietzes		14						0
	(United States) Hunter Harris							14	0
	(United States) Peter Papke			14				Wth	0
	(Canada) Bert Kuehne		21	17	15	16	23		0
	(United States) Roger Bighouse					15			0
	(United States) Patrick McGonegle						15		0
	(United States) John Gunn		DNQ	15					0
	(United States) Vic Todia						16		0
	(United States) Don Breidenbach				18		DNS	Wth	0
	(United States) Ed Kasprowicz						19		0
	(New Zealand) Graham McRae		Wth					19	0
	(United Kingdom) David Purley					19			0
	(United States) John Morton			20				24	0
	(United States) Rocky Moran							20	0
	(United States) Micky Fowler							21	0
	(United States) Greg Hodges		22						0
	(United States) Dick Kantrud						22		0
	(Italy) Maurizio Flammini							22	0
	(United States) Steve Behr		23						0
	(United States) Bob Earl							23	0
	(United States) Ed Polley						27	25	0
	(United States) Garth Pollard							26	0
	(United States) Dick Ferguson						29	DNQ	0
	(United Kingdom) Derek Bell						30		0
	(United States) Gerre Payvis	DNS							0
	(United States) Andy Ratcliffe			Wth				DNQ	0
	(United States) Dick Messier			DNQ					0
	(United States) Michael Brockman							DNQ	0
	(United States) Bill Baker		Wth						0
	(United States) Robert E. Dugo			Wth					0
	(United States) George Follmer							Wth	0
	(United States) Gary Matthews							Wth	0
	(United States) Chuck Bartlebaugh							Wth	0
	(United States) Ron Dykes							Wth	0
Pos	Driver	POC	MOS	WGL	ROA1	MOH	ROA2	RIV	Pts

Color	Result
Gold	Winner
Silver	2nd place
Bronze	3rd place
Green	4th to 10th place (points finish)
Dark Blue	Finished (Outside Top 10)
Purple	Did not finish (Ret)
Red	Did not qualify (DNQ)
Brown	Withdrawn (Wth)
Black	Disqualified (DSQ)
White	Did not start (DNS)
Blank	Did not participate (DNP)
Blank	Not competing

**In-line notation**
**Bold**	Pole position
