= March 75A =

- Category: Formula 5000
- Constructor: March
- Successor: March 76A

Technical specifications
- Chassis: Aluminium monocoque with load-bearing engine-transmission assembly, fiberglass and aluminum body
- Suspension (front): Independent, wishbones and inclined coil spring/shock absorber units
- Suspension (rear): Independent, single top link, twin tower links and coil spring/shock absorber units
- Engine: Mid-engine, longitudinally mounted, 3.4 L (207.5 cu in), Ford-Cosworth GAA, 90° V6, NA
- Transmission: Hewland 5-speed manual
- Weight: 1,500 lb (680 kg)

Competition history
- Notable drivers: (Australia) Alan Jones
- Debut: 1975

The March 75A was an open-wheel formula racing car, designed, developed and built by British manufacturer and constructor, March Engineering, for Formula 5000 racing, in 1975. It was based on the March 761 Formula One car. Unlike most other F5000 cars of the time, which used 5.0 L (310 cu in) V8 engines, the 75A used a smaller 3.4 L (210 cu in) Ford-Cosworth GAA V6 engine (which was still allowed; and permitted with F5000 regulations), which produced between 420–470 hp (310–350 kW) @ 9,000 rpm, depending on tuning and spec. Engines up to 5,000 cc (310 cu in) could be used, so this was still perfectly in line with the regulations.
