= Brian Redman =

British racing driver (born 1937)

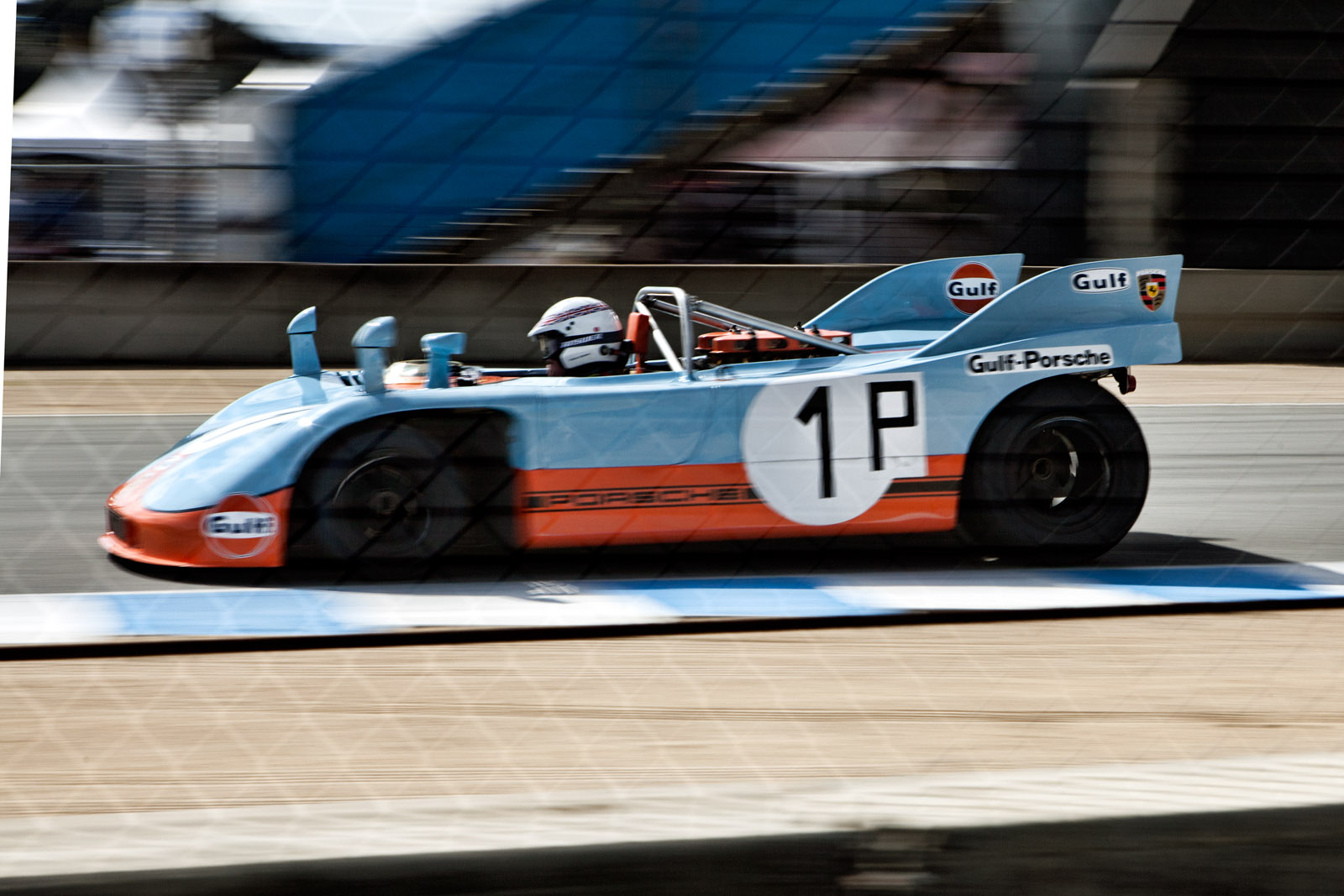
- Redman in 1971
- Nationality: (United Kingdom) British
- Born: Brian Herman Thomas Redman; 9 March 1937 (age 89) Burnley, Lancashire, England

Championship titles
- South African Springbok series (1970); SCCA/USAC Formula 5000 Championship (1974, 1975, 1976); IMSA GT Championship (1981); Major victories Kyalami 9 Hours (1967, 1971); 6 Hours of Brands Hatch (1968, 1969); 1000 Kilometres of Spa-Francorchamps (1968, 1969, 1970, 1972); 6 Hours of Watkins Glen (1969); 1000 Kilometres of Monza(1969, 1973); Nürburgring 1000 km(1969, 1973); Targa Florio (1970); Trophée International Paul Ricard (1970); 24 Hours of Daytona (1970, 1976, 1981); 12 Hours of Sebring (1975, 1978); 24 Hours of Le Mans (1978, 1980)

Formula One World Championship career
- Active years: 1968, 1970–1974
- Team(s): Cooper, Williams, Surtees, McLaren, BRM, Shadow
- Entries: 15 (12 starts)
- Championships: 0
- Wins: 0
- Podiums: 1
- Career points: 8
- Pole positions: 0
- Fastest laps: 0
- First entry: 1968 South African Grand Prix
- Last entry: 1974 Monaco Grand Prix

Brian Herman Thomas Redman (born 9 March 1937) is a British retired racing driver. Racing for Carl Haas and Jim Hall's Chaparral Cars, Brian Redman won the 1974, 1975 and 1976 SCCA Formula 5000 series and has raced in nearly every category of racing, including Formula One.

The Englishman began racing in 1959 and collected his first of four Manufacturers Championships in 1968, driving a Ford GT40 with Belgian Jacky Ickx for John Wyer Automotive Engineering. Redman also won the 1970/71 South African Springbok series and the IMSA Camel GTP Championship in 1981 driving a Lola T600. In addition to his four victories at Spa-Francorchamps, Redman has overall wins in the 1970 Targa Florio, the Watkins Glen 6 Hours, the 12 Hours of Sebring twice, the Nurburgring 1000 Km twice, Brands Hatch 6 Hours twice, Osterrechring 1000 Km twice, Monza 1000 Km twice, Kyalami 9 Hours twice, has been a two-time winner at the 24 Hours of Daytona and holds two class victories at Le Mans.

Redman is currently a regular at the Monterey Historic Automobile Races at Mazda Raceway Laguna Seca.

== Career ==
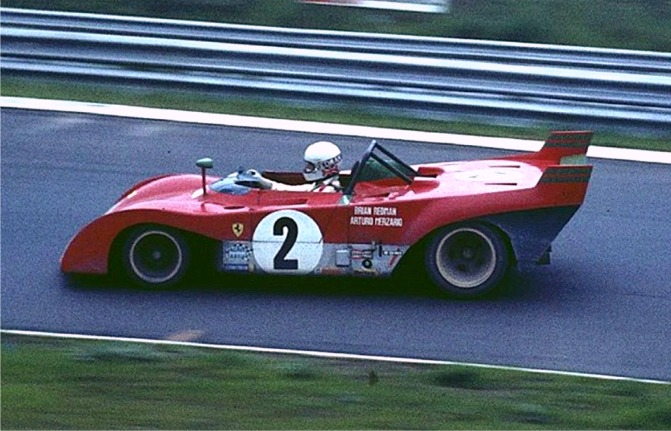
Redman driving a Ferrari 312PB at the Nürburgring in 1972

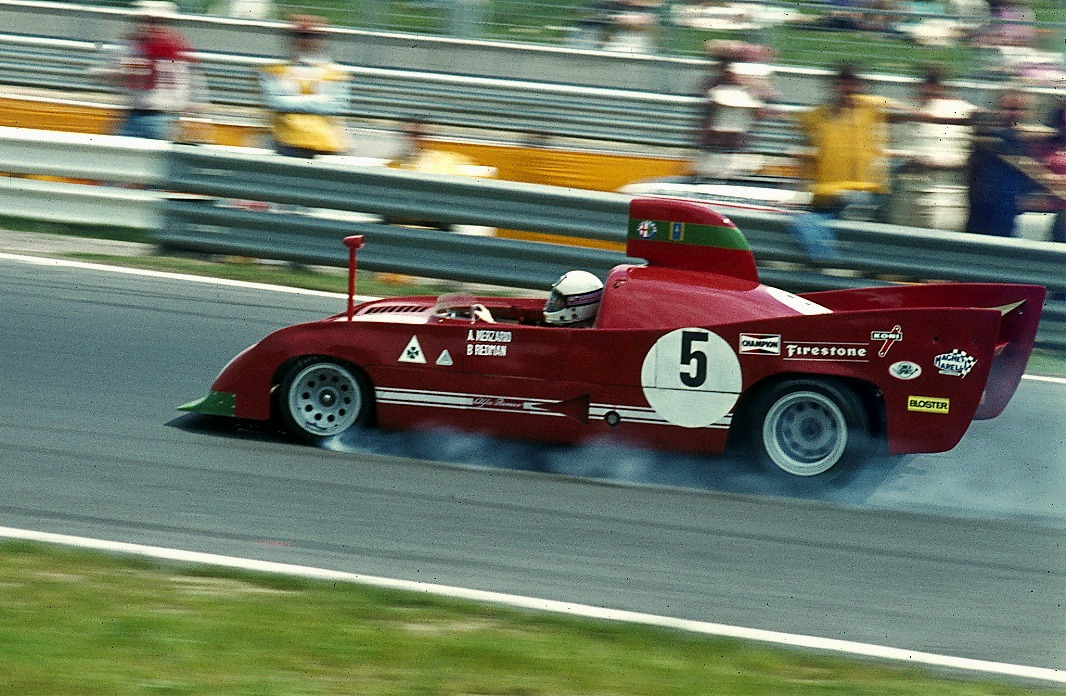
Redman driving an Alfa Romeo Tipo 33 TT 12 at the Nürburgring in 1974

Redman participated in 15 World Championship Grands Prix, debuting on 1 January 1968. He achieved one podium in the 1968 Spanish Grand Prix, finishing third in a Cooper-BRM behind Graham Hill in a Lotus-Ford and Denny Hulme in a McLaren-Ford. He then had an accident at the Belgian Grand Prix at Spa-Francorchamps, crashing his Cooper-BRM when the suspension broke at the Les Coombes corner; he survived with a badly broken arm. He scored a total of 8 championship points in his career, with two fifth places in 1972, at the Monaco Grand Prix and the German Grand Prix driving a Yardley McLaren.

Redman achieved spectacular success in sports-car racing, particularly in 1968 as a John Wyer Gulf driver, in 1969 and 1970 as a Porsche works driver and in 1972 with the Ferrari 312 PB; Winning at Spa Francorchamps 1000 Ks five times, the Nurburgring 1000 Ks three times, Daytona 24 Hours two times, Sebring twice, Watkins Glen 6 Hours, Osterreichring twice, Monza 1000 Ks twice, the Targa Florio, Brands Hatch 6 Hours twice etc.

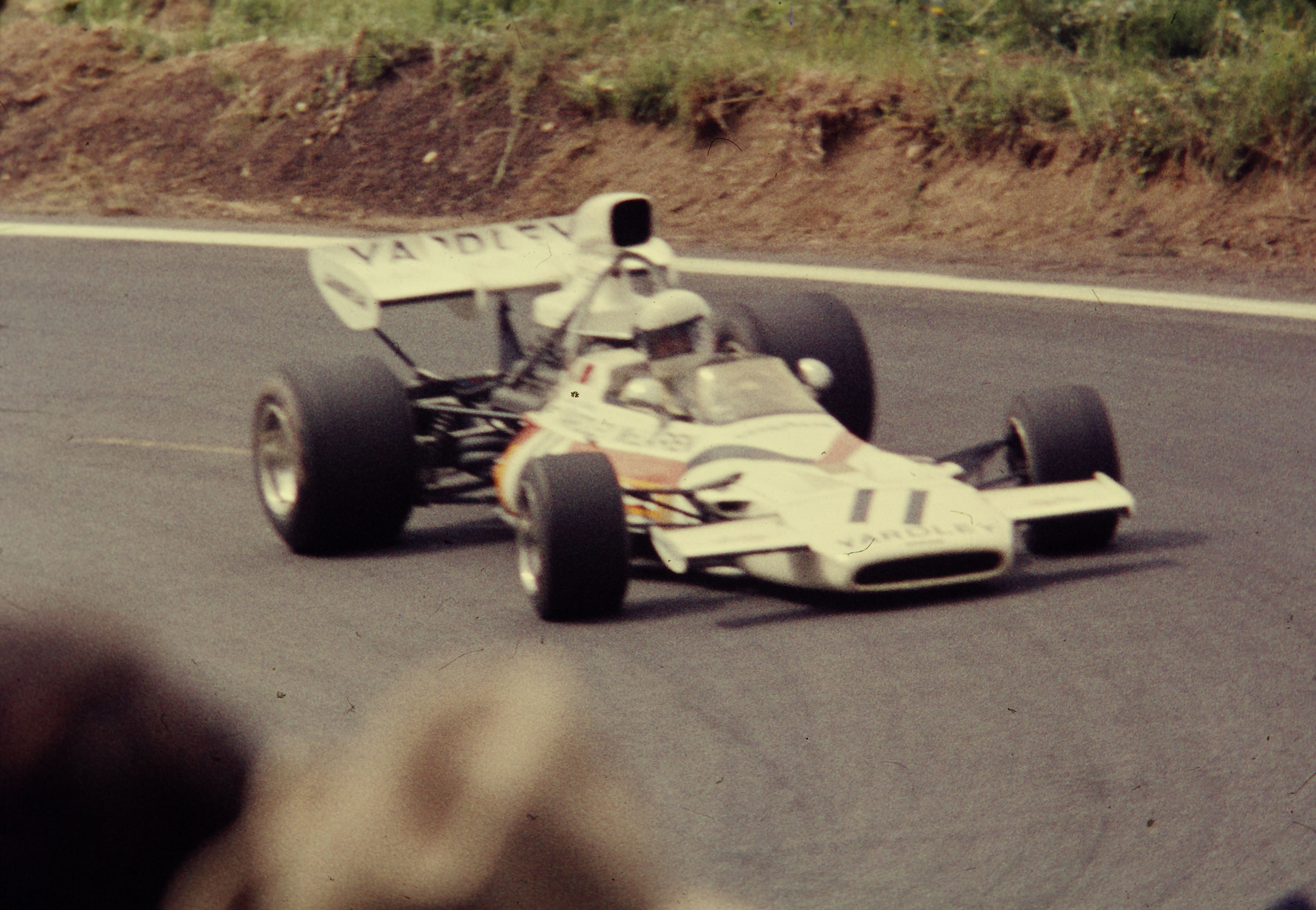
Redman driving at the 1972 French Grand Prix.

In 1973, Redman started racing in the USA full-time and won the SCCA/USAC Formula 5000 Championship three times in a row from 1974 to 1976 driving a Jim Hall/Carl Haas Lola T330/332C against considerable opposition, including Mario Andretti and Al Unser, Jody Scheckter, Jackie Oliver, Alan Jones, David Hobbs, Brett Lunger, Sam Posey, "Vern" Schuppan et al. Redman was employed at Haas's business office in Highland Park, Illinois, where he also lived for a time. At the end of 1976 the SCCA announced new rules. The F5000 single-seaters had to use full-width bodywork and the new series would be called Can-Am. On the first day of practice for the first race of the new season, at Circuit Mont-Tremblant, Canada the new car took off at 160 mph went 40 feet in the air and turned over, landing upside down. Redman suffered a broken bones plus bruising of the brain. The ambulance blew a tyre on the way to hospital. Redman was declared dead. It took him nine months to recover and he returned to racing on a spectacular note by winning the 12 Hours of Sebring in 1978 driving a Porsche 935. He continued driving for Dick Barbour Racing through 1979 and 1980. In 1981, driving the brand new Lolas T600 IMSA GTP car he won the first race at Laguna Seca and went on to win the IMSA Camel GTP championship. His last year of professional racing was at the age of 52, driving for the works Aston Martin team in the 1989 World Sports Prototype Championship. He later co-managed the Redman Bright racing team.

== Legacy ==
- Road America hosts The WeatherTech International Challenge with Brian Redman for vintage/historic cars, one of the largest and most prestigious vintage racing events in the US
- Redman is inducted in the following Halls of Fame: Daytona International Hall of Fame, Sebring Hall of Fame, Talladega Hall of Fame, Motor Sport Hall of Fame (UK), Long Beach Pavement of Fame.

== Racing record ==
=== Complete British Saloon Car Championship results ===
(key) (Races in bold indicate pole position; races in italics indicate fastest lap.)

Year	Team	Car	Class	1	2	3	4	5	6	7	8	9	10	11	12	Pos.	Pts	Class
1965	Vitafoam Developments	Austin Mini Cooper S	B	BRH	OUL	SNE; Ret	GOO	SIL	CRY	BRH	OUL					NC	0	NC
1966	Red Rose Racing	Alfa Romeo 1600 GTA	C	SNE	GOO	SIL	CRY	BRH	BRH	OUL; 4†	BRH					24th	6	7th
1978	Hermetite Racing with Leyland	Triumph Dolomite Sprint	C	SIL	OUL	THR	BRH	SIL	DON; DNS	MAL	BRH	DON	BRH	THR	OUL	NC	0	NC

† Events with 2 races staged for the different classes.

=== Complete European Formula Two Championship results ===
(key)

Year	Entrant	Chassis	Engine	1	2	3	4	5	6	7	8	9	10	Pos.	Pts
1967	David Bridges	Brabham BT16	Ford	SNE	SIL	NÜR; Ret	HOC	TUL						9th	8
1967	David Bridges	Lola T100	Ford						JAR; 6	ZAN	PER	BRH; 8	VAL; 5	9th	8
1968	David Bridges	Lola T100	Ford	HOC	THR	JAR	PAL; 2	TUL	ZAN	PER	HOC	VAL		9th	9

=== Complete Formula One World Championship results ===
(key)

Year	Entrant	Chassis	Engine	1	2	3	4	5	6	7	8	9	10	11	12	13	14	15	WDC	Pts
1967	David Bridges	Lola T100 (F2)	Ford Cosworth FVA 1.6 L4	RSA	MON	NED	BEL	FRA	GBR	GER; DNS	CAN	ITA	USA	MEX					NC	0
1968	Cooper Car Company	Cooper T81B	Maserati 10/F1 3.0 V12	RSA; Ret															19th	4
1968	Cooper Car Company	Cooper T86B	BRM P101 3.0 V12		ESP; 3	MON	BEL; Ret	NED	FRA	GBR	GER	ITA	CAN	USA	MEX				19th	4
1970	Frank Williams Racing Cars	De Tomaso 505/38	Ford Cosworth DFV 3.0 V8	RSA	ESP	MON	BEL	NED	FRA	GBR; DNS	GER; DNQ	AUT	ITA	CAN	USA	MEX			NC	0
1971	Team Surtees	Surtees TS7	Ford Cosworth DFV 3.0 V8	RSA; 7	ESP	MON	NED	FRA	GBR	GER	AUT	ITA	CAN	USA					NC	0
1972	Yardley Team McLaren	McLaren M19A	Ford Cosworth DFV 3.0 V8	ARG	RSA	ESP	MON; 5	BEL	FRA; 9	GBR	GER; 5	AUT	ITA	CAN					14th	4
1972	Marlboro BRM	BRM P180	BRM P142 3.0 V12												USA; Ret				14th	4
1973	Shadow Racing Team	Shadow DN1	Ford Cosworth DFV 3.0 V8	ARG	BRA	RSA	ESP	BEL	MON	SWE	FRA	GBR	NED	GER	AUT	ITA	CAN	USA; DSQ	NC	0
1974	UOP Shadow Racing Team	Shadow DN3	Ford Cosworth DFV 3.0 V8	ARG	BRA	RSA	ESP; 7	BEL; 18	MON; Ret	SWE	NED	FRA	GBR	GER	AUT	ITA	CAN	USA	NC	0

=== Non-championship Formula One results ===
(key)

Year	Entrant	Chassis	Engine	1	2	3	4	5	6	7	8
1967	David Bridges	Lola T100 (F2)	Ford Cosworth FVA 1.6 L4	ROC	SPC	INT	SYR	OUL; Ret	ESP; 8		
1968	Cooper Car Company	Cooper T86B	BRM P101 3.0 V12	ROC; 5	INT	OUL					
1971	Sid Taylor Racing	McLaren M18 (F5000)	Chevrolet 5.0 V8	ARG	ROC	QUE	SPR	INT; Ret	RIN	OUL; Ret	VIC
1972	Sid Taylor Racing	McLaren M10B (F5000)	Chevrolet 5.0 V8	ROC; Ret	BRA	INT; DNS					
1972	Sid Taylor Racing	Chevron B24 (F5000)	Chevrolet 5.0 V8				OUL; 4	REP			
1972	Yardley Team McLaren	McLaren M19A	Ford Cosworth DFV 3.0 V8						VIC; 7		
1974	Sid Taylor Racing	Lola T332 (F5000)	Chevrolet 5.0 V8	PRE	ROC; DNS						
1974	Team Ensign	Ensign N174	Ford Cosworth DFV 3.0 V8			INT; 8					
1975	A.G. Dean	Chevron B24/B28 (F5000)	Chevrolet 5.0 V8	ROC; DNQ	INT	SUI					

=== Complete 24 Hours of Le Mans results ===
Year	Team	Co-Drivers	Car	Class	Laps	Pos.	Class Pos.
1967	(United Kingdom) J.W. Automotive	(United Kingdom) Mike Salmon	Ford GT40 Mk I	S 5.0	220	DNF	DNF
1969	(Switzerland) Hart Ski Racing	(Switzerland) Jo Siffert	Porsche 908/2L	P 3.0	60	DNF	DNF
1970	(United Kingdom) John Wyer Automotive Engineering Ltd.	(Switzerland) Jo Siffert	Porsche 917K	S 5.0	156	DNF	DNF
1973	(Italy) SpA Ferrari SEFAC	(Belgium) Jacky Ickx	Ferrari 312PB	S 3.0	332	DNF	DNF
1976	(Germany) B.M.W. Motorsport GmbH	(United States) Peter Gregg	BMW 3.0CSL Turbo	Gr 5	23	DNF	DNF
1978	(United States) Dick Barbour Racing	(United States) John Paul Sr. (United States) Dick Barbour	Porsche 935/77A	IMSA +2.5	337	5th	**1st**
1979	(Germany) Essex Motorsport Porsche	(Belgium) Jacky Ickx (Germany) Jürgen Barth	Porsche 936	S +2.0	200	DNF	DNF
1980	(United States) Dick Barbour	(United Kingdom) John Fitzpatrick (United States) Dick Barbour	Porsche 935 K3/80	IMSA	318	5th	**1st**
1981	(United States) Cooke-Woods Racing	(United States) Bobby Rahal	Lola T600-Porsche	S +2.0	-	DNQ	DNQ
1982	(United States) Cooke Racing - Malardeau	(United States) Ralph Kent-Cooke (United States) Jim Adams	Lola T610-Ford Cosworth	C	28	DNF	DNF
1984	(United States) Jaguar Group 44	(United States) Doc Bundy (United States) Bob Tullius	Jaguar XJR-5	IMSA; GTP	291	DNF	DNF
1985	(United States) Jaguar Group 44	(United States) Hurley Haywood (United States) Jim Adams	Jaguar XJR-5	GTP	151	DNF	DNF
1986	(United Kingdom) Silk Cut Jaguar	(Germany) Hans Heyer (United States) Hurley Haywood	Jaguar XJR-6	C1	53	DNF	DNF
1988	(Australia) Takefuji Schuppan Racing Team	(Sweden) Eje Elgh (France) Jean-Pierre Jarier	Porsche 962C	C1	359	10th	10th
1989	(United Kingdom) Aston Martin (United Kingdom) Ecurie Ecosse	(Greece) Costas Los (Republic of Ireland) Michael Roe	Aston Martin AMR1	C1	340	11th	9th

Sporting positions
Preceded by Jody Scheckter	US Formula A/F5000; Champion; 1974-1976	Succeeded by Patrick Tambay
Preceded by John Fitzpatrick	IMSA GT Championship; Champion; 1981	Succeeded by John Paul Jr.
