= Chevron B28 =

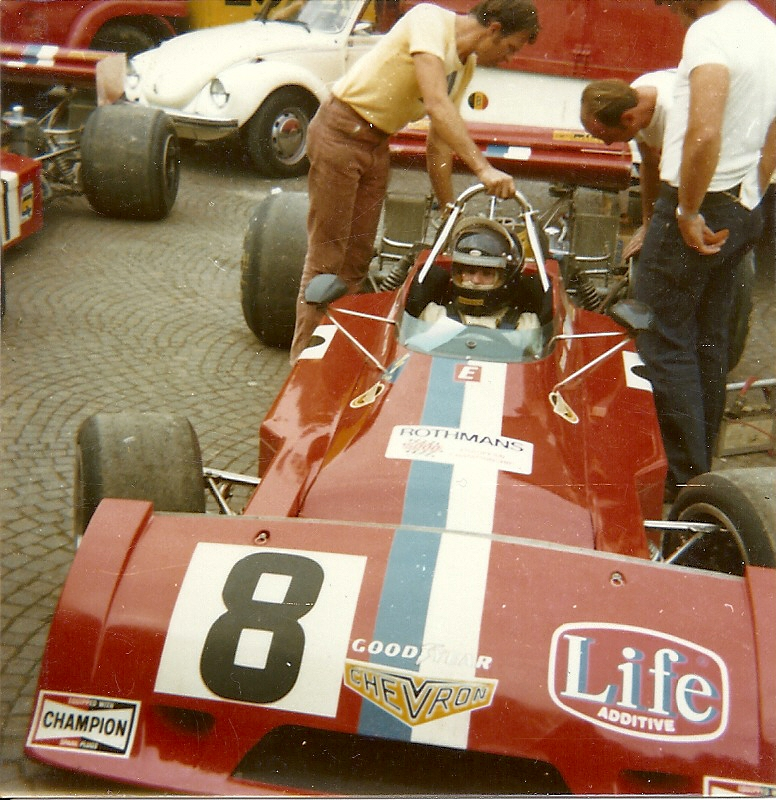
Peter Gethin in the Chevron B28 at Monza, in 1974

The Chevron B28 was an open-wheel race car, designed, developed and built by British Manufacturer Chevron, for Formula 5000 racing, in 1973. It was driven by Peter Gethin, Teddy Pilette, Vern Schuppan, and Chris Craft. Briton Peter Gethin won 4 races in the 1974 season with the B28, eventually finishing second place, as runner-up in the championship, with 186 points. Gethin's Belgian teammate, Teddy Pilette, would finish fourth place in the championship, with 108 points. Chevron only produced two finished models of the B28. It did compete at the non-championship Race of Champions Formula One race, being driven by Peter Gethin (who started in 16th-place), and its best result there was a 10th-place finish. It was later converted into a closed-wheel prototype-style car, and used in the revived Can-Am series in North America. As with most other cars of the time, it was powered by the commonly used Chevrolet small-block engine.
