= Trojan–Tauranac Racing =

Automobile manufacturer

Trojan
- Full name: Trojan–Tauranac Racing (1974)
- Noted drivers: Tim Schenken

Formula One World Championship career
- First entry: 1974 Spanish Grand Prix
- Races entered: 8 (6 starts from 8 entries)
- Engines: Ford
- Constructors' Championships: 0
- Drivers' Championships: 0
- Race victories: 0 (best result: 10th, 1974 Belgian Grand Prix)
- Podiums: 0
- Points: 0
- Pole positions: 0 (best result: 19th, 1974 Austrian Grand Prix)
- Fastest laps: 0 (best result: 16th, 1974 Spanish Grand Prix)
- Final entry: 1974 Italian Grand Prix

Trojan was an automobile manufacturer and a Formula One constructor, in conjunction with Australian Ron Tauranac, from the United Kingdom. They participated in 8 Grands Prix in 1974. They qualified six times and scored no championship points.

== History ==
The car producer Trojan Limited was founded by Leslie Hounsfield in 1914 in Clapham, South London, and later in Purley Way, Croydon, Surrey. It produced cars and especially delivery vans until 1964.

Around 1960, the Trojan business was sold to Peter Agg who imported Lambretta scooters for the British market. In 1962, the rights to manufacture the Heinkel microcar were acquired and the production line was moved from Dundalk, Ireland to Croydon. Production then commenced, renaming the bubble car as Trojan Cabin Cruiser. Production continued until 1965, when some 6,000 cars had been produced. Speaking to Motor Cycle magazine in 1965 after cessation of production, Peter Agg confirmed that a 1962 British government reduction in purchase tax from 50% to 25% aligning car taxation with three-wheelers and motorbikes, had given a big boost to the cheaper end of the car market, adversely affecting sales of the economy-sector three-wheeler, making continued production uneconomical.

Also in 1962, Trojan acquired the Elva sports car business and started to make the Mk IV Elva Courier. This in turn led to the manufacturing of McLaren racing cars until vehicle production finally ceased in the early 1970s. Trojan Limited still exists as an independent company though the factory was sold in the 1970s.

The Trojan T101 Formula 5000 model met with success when Jody Scheckter won the 1973 SCCA L&M Championship driving a T101 and a Lola T330.

They participated in eight grands prix, entering a total of eight cars. In 1974, David Purley won the Brighton Speed Trials driving a Trojan-Chevrolet T101. While Formula One remained the major series, sports cars were also fashionable on either side of the Atlantic. The McLaren M1 was put into production by Peter Agg's Lambretta Trojan Group in its factory at Purley Way, Croydon, Surrey. They would make 200 McLarens during ten years.

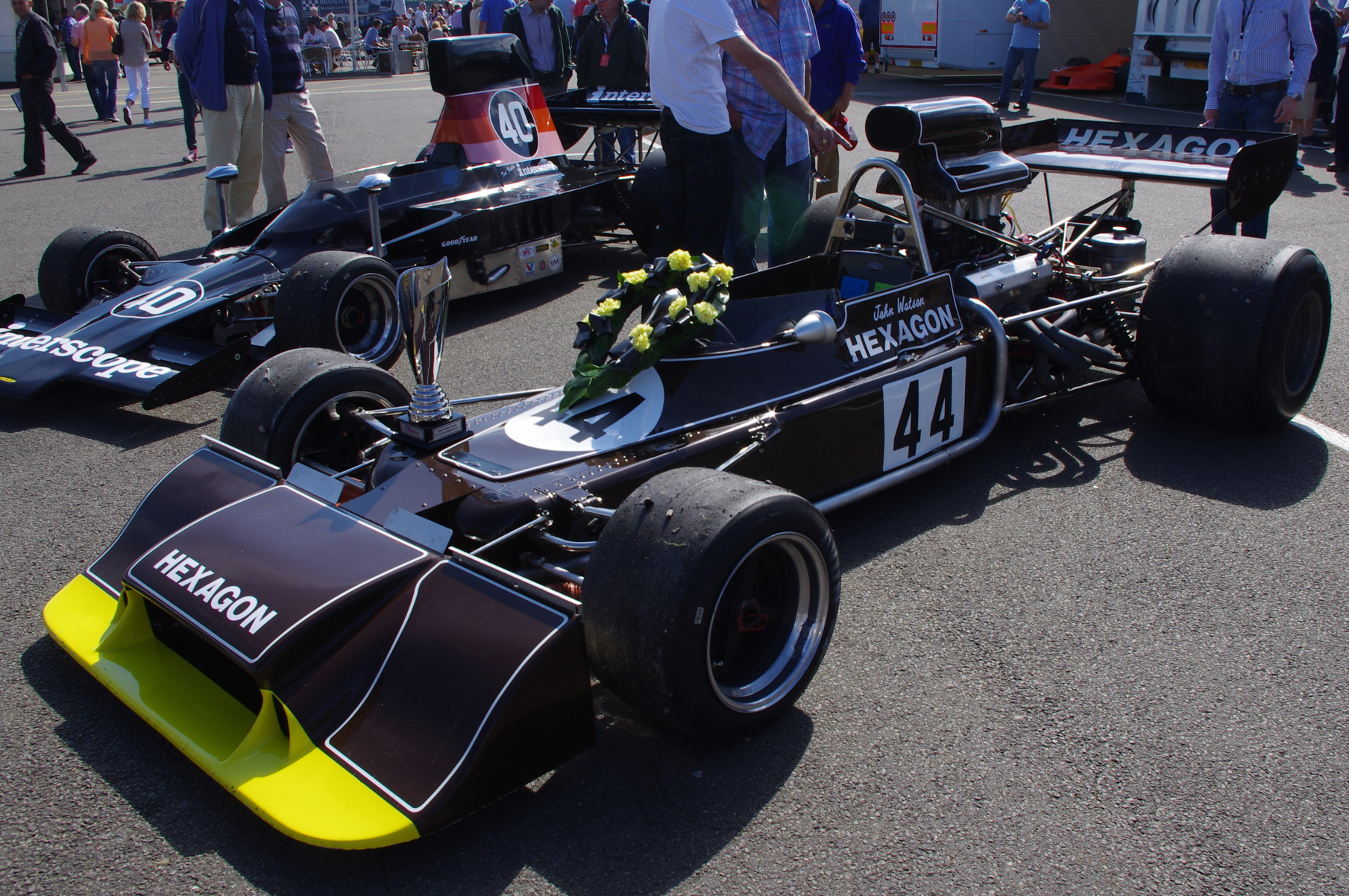
Trojan T101 Formula 5000 car

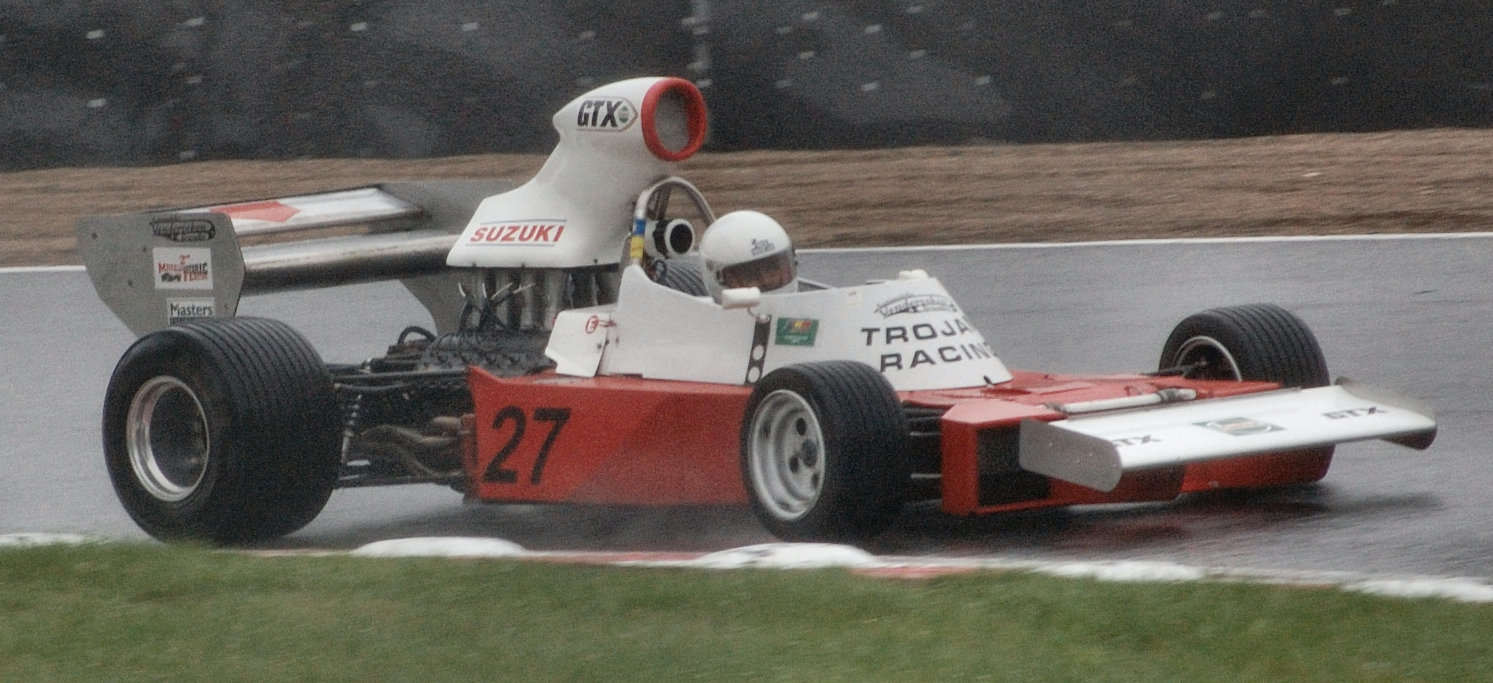
Trojan T103 Formula One car

== Complete Formula One World Championship results ==
(key)

Year	Chassis	Engine	Tyres	Drivers	No.	1	2	3	4	5	6	7	8	9	10	11	12	13	14	15	Pts.	WCC
1974	Trojan T103	Ford V8	F			ARG	BRA	RSA	ESP	BEL	MON	SWE	NED	FRA	GBR	GER	AUT	ITA	CAN	USA	0	NC
1974	Trojan T103	Ford V8	F	(Australia) Tim Schenken	23				14		Ret		DNQ		Ret	DNQ	10				0	NC
1974	Trojan T103	Ford V8	F	(Australia) Tim Schenken	29													Ret			0	NC
1974	Trojan T103	Ford V8	F	(Australia) Tim Schenken	41					10											0	NC

== See also ==
- Trojan (automobile)
