= March 73A =

- Category: Formula 5000
- Constructor: March
- Predecessor: March 72A

Technical specifications
- Chassis: Aluminium monocoque with load-bearing engine-transmission assembly, fiberglass and aluminum body
- Suspension (front): Independent, wishbones and inclined coil spring/shock absorber units
- Suspension (rear): Independent, single top link, twin tower links and coil spring/shock absorber units
- Engine: Mid-engine, longitudinally mounted, 5.0 L (305.1 cu in), Chevrolet, 90° V8, NA
- Transmission: Hewland DG300 5-speed manual
- Weight: 1,500 lb (680 kg)

Competition history
- Notable drivers: (United States) Skip Barber (United States) John Gunn (United States) Bill Tempero (United Kingdom) Clive Baker (Canada) John Cannon
- Debut: 1973

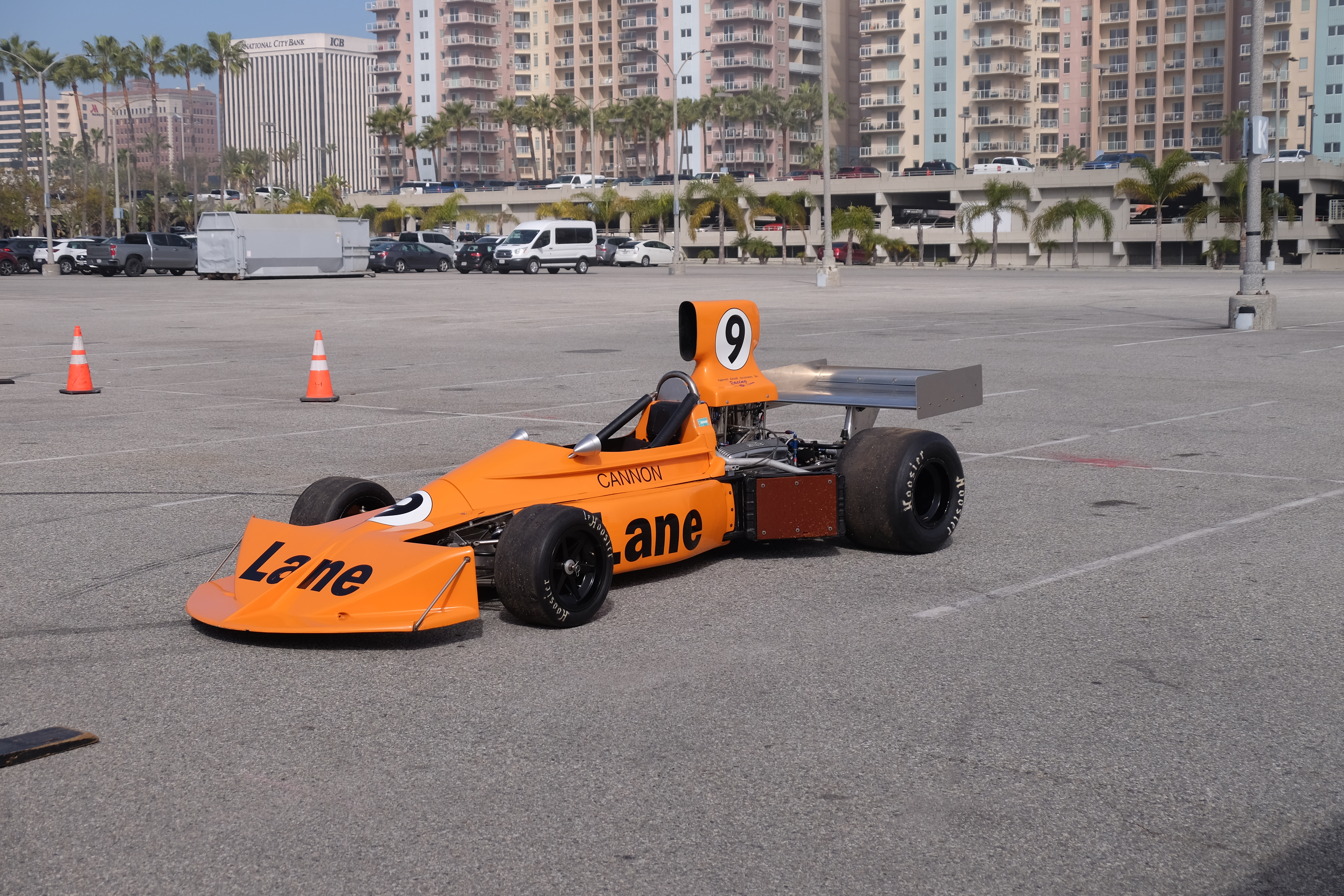
John Cannon's 73A

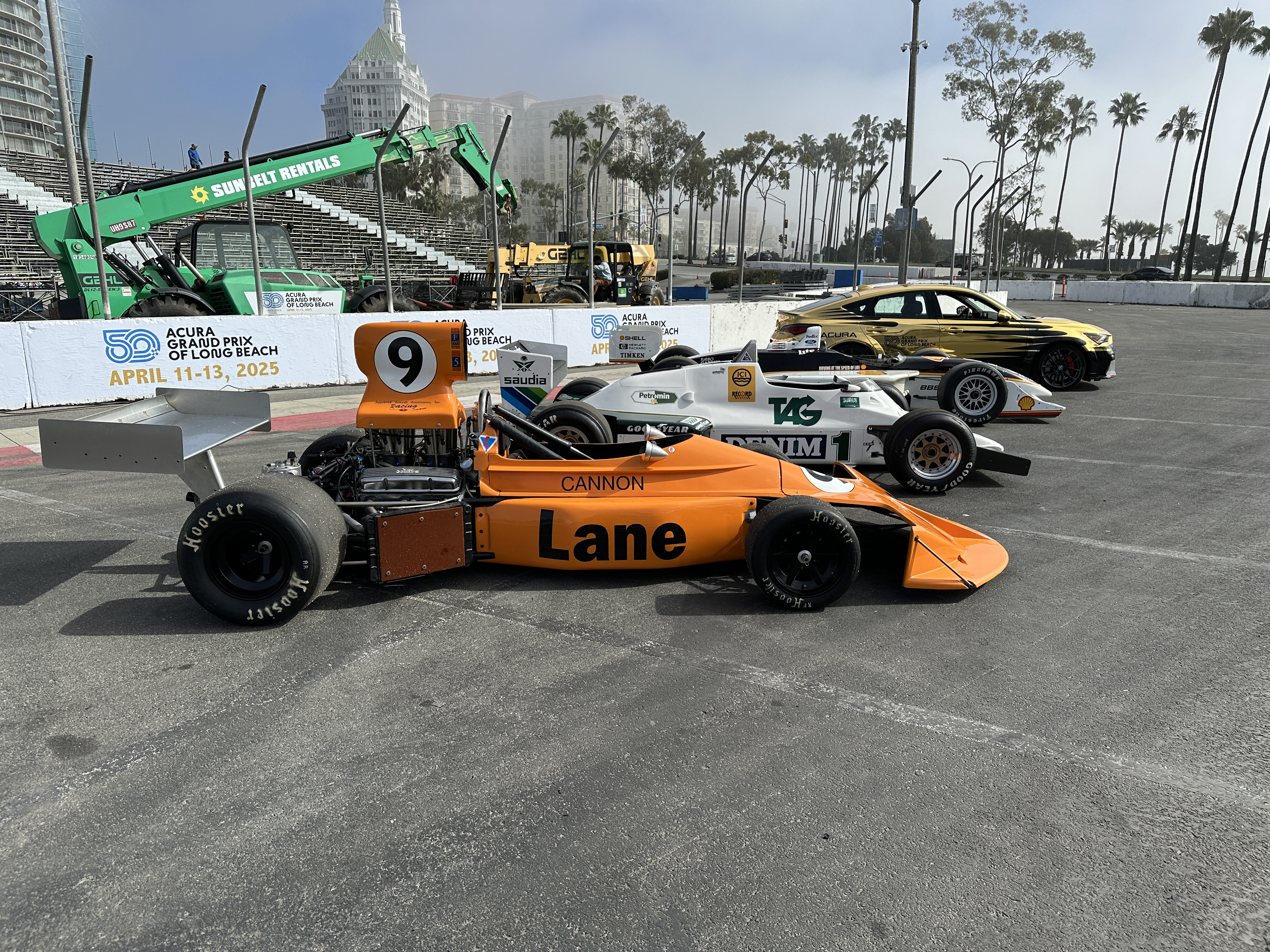
2025 Long Beach Grand Prix

The March 73A was an open-wheel formula racing car, designed, developed, and built by British manufacturer and constructor, March Engineering, for Formula 5000 racing, between 1973 and 1974. It competed in both the European and SCCA U.S. F5000 championships. It also competed in one non-championship Formula One World Championship Grand Prix; the 1973 Race of Champions. It was later converted into a closed-wheel Can-Am-style prototype chassis, where it competed in the 1984 championship.
