= Lola T300 =

Open-Wheel Formula Race Car

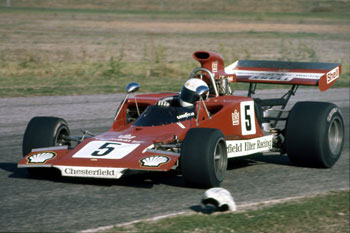
- Category: Formula 5000
- Constructor: Lola Cars
- Designer(s): Eric Broadley

Technical specifications
- Chassis: Glass fiber-reinforced polyester,
- Suspension (front): Independent, lower wishbones and inclined coil spring/shock absorber units
- Suspension (rear): Independent, single top link, twin tower links and coil spring/shock absorber units
- Length: 138 mm (5.4 in)
- Width: 1,876 mm (73.9 in)
- Height: 888 mm (35.0 in) (to roll bar); 660 mm (26 in) (to windshield)
- Axle track: Front: 1,472 mm (58.0 in); Rear: 1,625 mm (64.0 in)
- Wheelbase: 2,563 mm (100.9 in)
- Engine: Mid-engine, longitudinally mounted, 4,940 cc (301.5 cu in), Chevrolet, 90° V8, NA
- Transmission: Hewland DG300 5-speed manual
- Power: 510 hp (380 kW); 400 lb⋅ft (542 N⋅m)
- Weight: 1,360 lb (620 kg)
- Tyres: Avon

Competition history
- Debut: 1971

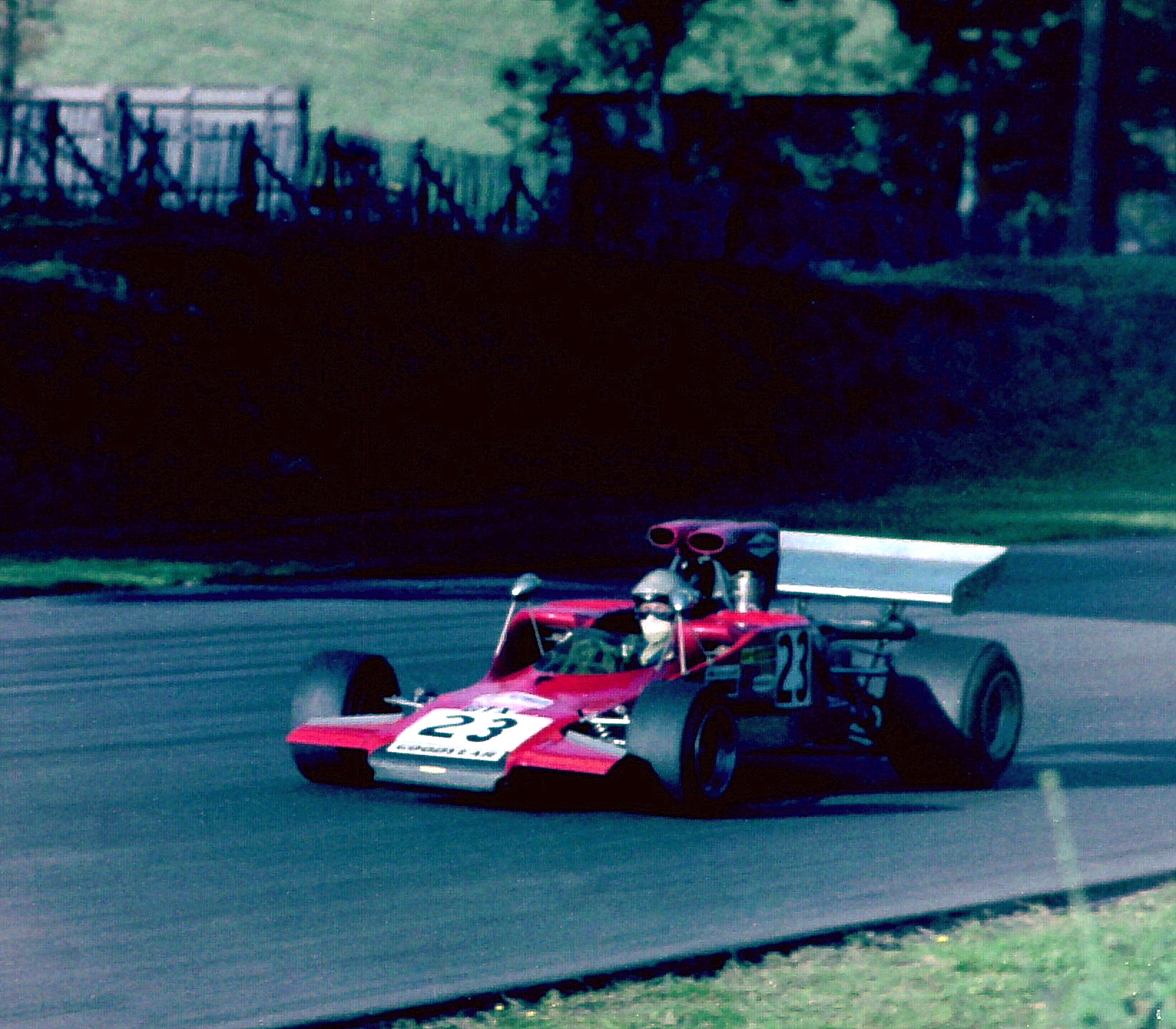
Frank Gardner in a Lola T300 at Brands Hatch in 1971

The Lola T300 was an open-wheel formula race car, designed, developed and built by Lola Cars, for Formula 5000 racing, in 1971.
