= Gus Hutchison =

American racing driver (born 1937)

- Born: April 26, 1937 (age 89); Atlanta, Georgia, U.S.

Formula One World Championship career
- Nationality: (United States) American
- Active years: 1970
- Team: private Brabham
- Entries: 1
- Championships: 0
- Wins: 0
- Podiums: 0
- Career points: 0
- Pole positions: 0
- Fastest laps: 0
- First entry: 1970 United States Grand Prix

Augustus Hutchison (born April 26, 1937 in Atlanta, Georgia) is an American former racecar driver.

Hutchison was the winner of the 1967 SCCA Grand Prix Championship driving a Lotus 41.

In 1970, Hutchison purchased a Formula One Brabham BT26, entering it in the 1970 United States Grand Prix. He retired after 21 laps with a loose fuel tank.

When Formula A became Formula 5000, Hutchison continued driving in the SCCA series, driving cars from Lola and March.

After retiring from racing, Hutchison focused on running his business, Solar Kinetics, based in Dallas.

== Complete Formula One World Championship results ==
(key)

Year	Entrant	Chassis	Engine	1	2	3	4	5	6	7	8	9	10	11	12	13	WDC	Points
1970	Gus Hutchison	Brabham BT26	Ford V8	RSA	ESP	MON	BEL	NED	FRA	GBR	GER	AUT	ITA	CAN	USA; Ret	MEX	NC	0

== Complete Formula One Non-Championship results ==
(key)

Year	Entrant	Chassis	Engine	1	2	3	4	5	6	7	8
1971	Aero Structures Developments	ASD Mk1	Chevrolet V8	ARG	ROC	QUE; 18	SPR	INT	RIN	OUL	VIC
