= Chevron B24 =

Formula 5000 racing car

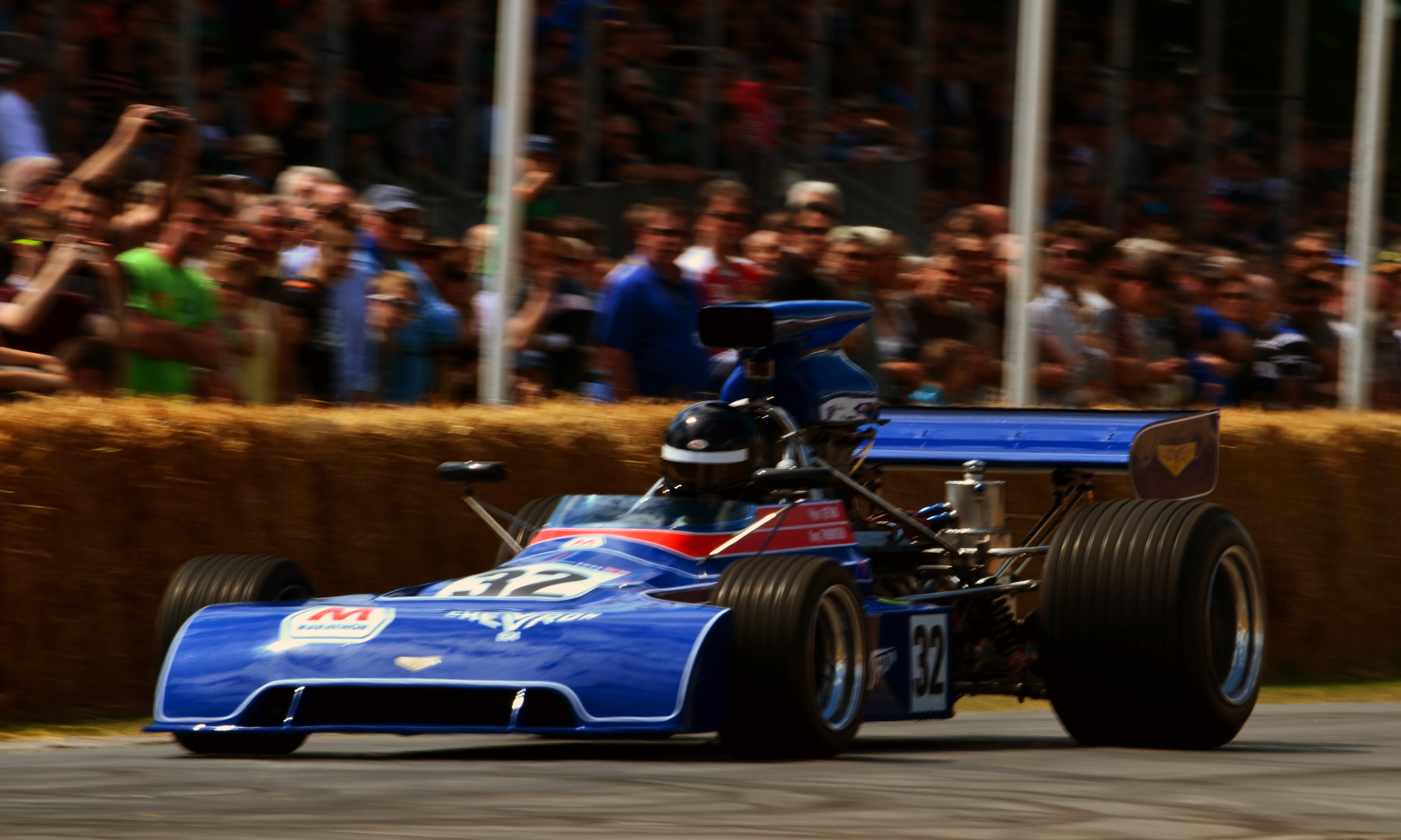
Chevron B24 at Goodwood in 2014

The Chevron B24 was a Formula 5000 racing car developed by Chevron Cars in 1972.

The B24 was Chevron's first Formula 5000 racing car and thus the British racing car manufacturer's entry into the construction of large single-seaters. So far, Chevron had limited itself to vehicles in the smaller formula classes. In Chevron's nomenclature, the B24 succeeded the Chevron B23, a 2-liter displacement sports car developed in the early 1970s. Chevron built eight examples, all of which were fitted with a Chevrolet V8 engine. The B24 was a successful racing car that won numerous races. The car type is also notable in that it marks the only success of a Formula 5000 car over Formula 1 cars. In 1973, Peter Gethin won the Race of Champions in Brands Hatch with a works B24 for Formula 5000 and Formula 1 racing cars. Gethin also won the 1974 Tasman Championship in a B24.
