= Lola T330 =

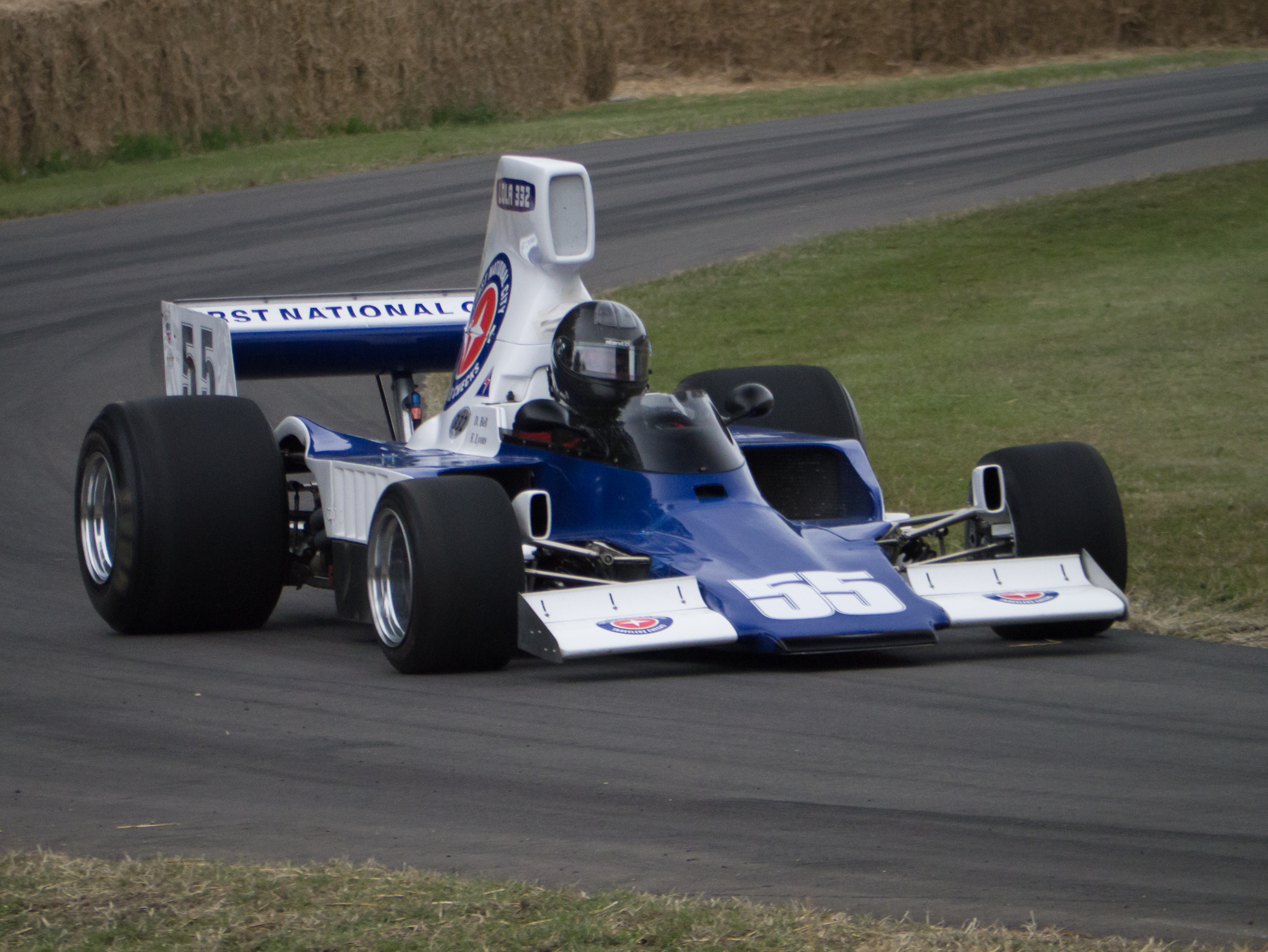
- Category: Formula 5000
- Constructor: Lola Cars
- Designer: Eric Broadley

Technical specifications
- Chassis: Steel and aluminium monocoque with load-bearing engine-transmission assembly
- Suspension (front): Independent, wishbones and inclined coil spring/shock absorber units
- Suspension (rear): Independent, single top link, twin tower links and coil spring/shock absorber units
- Axle track: Front: 1,625 mm (64.0 in); Rear: 1,625 mm (64.0 in)
- Wheelbase: 2,591 mm (102.0 in)
- Engine: Mid-engine, longitudinally mounted, 4,940 cc (301.5 cu in), Chevrolet, 90° V8, NA
- Transmission: Hewland DG300 5-speed manual
- Power: 510 hp (380 kW); 400 lb⋅ft (542 N⋅m)
- Weight: 650–665 kg (1,433–1,466 lb)
- Tyres: Avon

Competition history
- Debut: 1973

The Lola T330 was an open-wheel formula race car, designed, developed and built by Lola Cars, for Formula 5000 racing, in 1973.

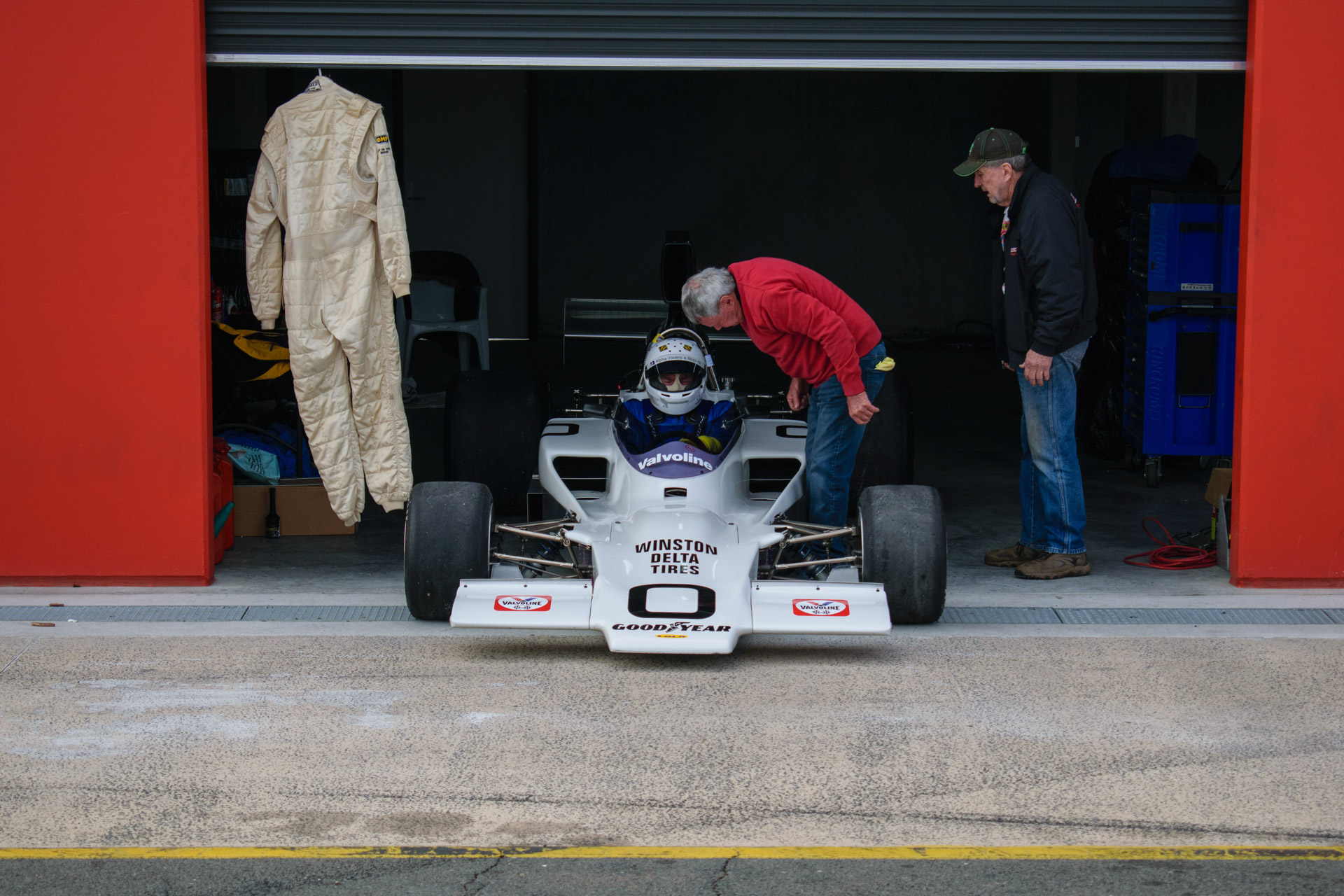
Lola T330 F5000 car in the pits at Queensland raceway
