= List of 1967 motorsport champions =

1967 motorsport champions
Previous: 1966	Next: 1968

This list of 1967 motorsport champions is a list of national or international auto racing series with a Championship decided by the points or positions earned by a driver from multiple races.

== Drag racing ==
Series	Champion	Refer
NHRA Drag Racing Series	Top Fuel: (United States) Bennie Osborn	1967 NHRA Drag Racing Series

== Karting ==
Series	Driver	Season article
Karting World Championship	(Switzerland) Edgardo Rossi	1967 Karting World Championship

== Motorcycle ==
Series	Rider	Season
500cc World Championship	(Italy) Giacomo Agostini	1967 Grand Prix motorcycle racing season
350cc World Championship	(United Kingdom) Mike Hailwood	1967 Grand Prix motorcycle racing season
250cc World Championship	(United Kingdom) Mike Hailwood	1967 Grand Prix motorcycle racing season
125cc World Championship	(United Kingdom) Bill Ivy	1967 Grand Prix motorcycle racing season
50cc World Championship	(West Germany) Hans-Georg Anscheidt	1967 Grand Prix motorcycle racing season
Speedway World Championship	(Sweden) Ove Fundin	1967 Individual Speedway World Championship

== Open wheel racing ==
Series	Driver	Season
Formula One World Championship	(New Zealand) Denny Hulme	1967 Formula One season
Formula One World Championship	Constructors: (United Kingdom) Brabham-Repco	1967 Formula One season
European Formula Two Championship	(Belgium) Jacky Ickx	1967 European Formula Two Championship
USAC National Championship	(United States) A. J. Foyt	1967 USAC Championship Car season
SCCA Grand Prix Championship	(United States) Gus Hutchison	1967 SCCA Grand Prix Championship
Tasman Series	(United Kingdom) Jim Clark	1967 Tasman Series
Australian Drivers' Championship	(Australia) Spencer Martin	1967 Australian Drivers' Championship
Australian One and a Half Litre Championship	(Australia) Max Stewart	1967 Australian One and a Half Litre Championship
Cup of Peace and Friendship	(East Germany) Heinz Melkus	1967 Cup of Peace and Friendship
Cup of Peace and Friendship	Nations: East Germany	1967 Cup of Peace and Friendship
South African Formula One Championship	(Rhodesia) John Love	1967 South African Formula One Championship
Formula Three
Les Leston British Formula Three Championship	(United Kingdom) Harry Stiller	
East German Formula Three Championship	(East Germany) Heinz Melkus	1967 East German Formula Three Championship
East German Formula Three Championship	LK II: (East Germany) Jürgen Käppler	1967 East German Formula Three Championship
French Formula Three Championship	(France) Henri Pescarolo	
French Formula Three Championship	Teams: (France) Equipe Matra Sports	
Soviet Formula 3 Championship	(Soviet Union) Vladimir Grekov	1967 Soviet Formula 3 Championship

== Rallying ==
Series	Drivers	Season article
British Rally Championship	(United Kingdom) Jim Bullough	1967 British Rally Championship
British Rally Championship	Co-Drivers: (United Kingdom) Don Barrow	1967 British Rally Championship
Canadian Rally Championship	(Canada) Klaus Ross	1967 Canadian Rally Championship
Canadian Rally Championship	Co-Drivers: (Canada) Paul S. Manson	1967 Canadian Rally Championship
Estonian Rally Championship	(Estonian Soviet Socialist Republic) Gunnar Holm	1967 Estonian Rally Championship
Estonian Rally Championship	Co-Drivers: (Estonian Soviet Socialist Republic) Hans Rüütel	1967 Estonian Rally Championship
European Rally Championship	Group 1: (Poland) Sobiesław Zasada	1967 European Rally Championship
European Rally Championship	Group 1 Co-Drivers: (Poland) Ewa Zasada	1967 European Rally Championship
European Rally Championship	Group 2: (Sweden) Bengt Söderström	1967 European Rally Championship
European Rally Championship	Group 2 Co-Drivers: (Sweden) Gunnar Palm	1967 European Rally Championship
European Rally Championship	Group 3: (United Kingdom) Vic Elford	1967 European Rally Championship
European Rally Championship	Group 3 Co-Drivers: (United Kingdom) David Stone	1967 European Rally Championship
Finnish Rally Championship	(Finland) Simo Lampinen	1967 Finnish Rally Championship
French Rally Championship	(France) Bernard Consten	1967 French Rally Championship
Italian Rally Championship	(Italy) Sandro Munari	
Italian Rally Championship	Co-Drivers: (Italy) Luciano Lombardini	
Italian Rally Championship	Manufacturers: (Italy) Lancia	
Polish Rally Championship	(Poland) Sobiesław Zasada	1967 Polish Rally Championship
South African National Rally Championship	(South Africa) Jan Hettema	
South African National Rally Championship	Co-Drivers: (South Africa) Robbie Broekmeyer	
Spanish Rally Championship	(France) Bernard Tramont	
Spanish Rally Championship	Co-Drivers: (Spain) Ricardo Muñoz	

== Sports car and GT ==
Series	Manufacturer	Season
International Manufacturers Championship	Class P+2.0: (Italy) Ferrari; Class P2.0: (West Germany) Porsche	1967 World Sportscar Championship
International Sports Car Championship	Class S+2.0: (United States) Ford; Class S2.0: (West Germany) Porsche; Class S1.3: (Italy) Abarth	1967 World Sportscar Championship
Canadian American Challenge Cup	(New Zealand) Bruce McLaren	1967 Can-Am season
United States Road Racing Championship	(United States) Mark Donohue	1967 United States Road Racing Championship

== Stock car racing ==
Series	Driver	Season article
NASCAR Grand National Series	(United States) Richard Petty	1967 NASCAR Grand National Series
NASCAR Grand National Series	Manufacturers: (United States) Ford	1967 NASCAR Grand National Series
NASCAR Pacific Coast Late Model Series	(United States) Scotty Cain	1967 NASCAR Pacific Coast Late Model Series
ARCA Racing Series	(United States) Iggy Katona	1967 ARCA Racing Series
Turismo Carretera	(Argentina) Eduardo Copello	1967 Turismo Carretera
USAC Stock Car National Championship	(United States) Don White	1967 USAC Stock Car National Championship

== Touring car ==
Series	Driver/Manufacturer	Season
European Touring Car Challenge	Div.3 (Germany) Karl von Wendt	
European Touring Car Challenge	Div.3 Teams: (Germany) Porsche	
European Touring Car Challenge	Div.2 (Italy) Andrea de Adamich	
European Touring Car Challenge	Div.2 Teams: (Italy) Alfa Romeo	
European Touring Car Challenge	Div.1 (Germany) Willi Kauhsen	
European Touring Car Challenge	Div.1 Teams: (Italy) Abarth	
Australian Touring Car Championship	(Australia) Ian Geoghegan	1967 Australian Touring Car Championship
Trans-American Sedan Championship	Over 2.0L: (United States) Ford	1967 Trans-Am season
Trans-American Sedan Championship	Under 2.0L: (Germany) Porsche	1967 Trans-Am season
British Saloon Car Championship	(Australia) Frank Gardner	1967 British Saloon Car Championship

== See also ==
- List of motorsport championships
- Auto racing
