= List of 1971 motorsport champions =

1971 motorsport champions
Previous: 1970	Next: 1972

This list of 1971 motorsport champions is a list of national or international auto racing series with a Championship decided by the points or positions earned by a driver from multiple races.

== Drag racing ==
Series	Champion	Refer
NHRA Drag Racing Series	Top Fuel: (United States) Gerry Glenn	1971 NHRA Drag Racing Series
NHRA Drag Racing Series	Funny Car: (United States) Phil Castronovo	1971 NHRA Drag Racing Series
NHRA Drag Racing Series	Pro Stock: (United States) Mike Fons	1971 NHRA Drag Racing Series

== Karting ==
Series	Driver	Season article
Karting World Championship	(Belgium) François Goldstein	
Karting World Championship	Junior: (Belgium) Marc Wouters	
Karting European Championship	(Belgium) François Goldstein	

== Motorcycle racing ==
Series	Rider	Season
500cc World Championship	(Italy) Giacomo Agostini	1971 Grand Prix motorcycle racing season
350cc World Championship	(Italy) Giacomo Agostini	1971 Grand Prix motorcycle racing season
250cc World Championship	(United Kingdom) Phil Read	1971 Grand Prix motorcycle racing season
125cc World Championship	(Spain) Ángel Nieto	1971 Grand Prix motorcycle racing season
50cc World Championship	(Netherlands) Jan De Vries	1971 Grand Prix motorcycle racing season
Speedway World Championship	(Denmark) Ole Olsen	1971 Individual Speedway World Championship

=== Motocross ===
Series	Rider	Season
FIM Motocross World Championship	500cc: (Belgium) Roger De Coster	1971 FIM Motocross World Championship
FIM Motocross World Championship	250cc: (Belgium) Joël Robert	1971 FIM Motocross World Championship
Trans-AMA Motocross Series	(Belgium) Sylvain Geboers	1971 Trans-AMA motocross series

== Open wheel racing ==
Series	Driver	Season
Formula One World Championship	(United Kingdom) Jackie Stewart	1971 Formula One season
Formula One World Championship	Constructors: (United Kingdom) Tyrrell-Ford	1971 Formula One season
European Formula Two Championship	(Sweden) Ronnie Peterson	1971 European Formula Two Championship
USAC National Championship	(United States) Joe Leonard	1971 USAC Championship Car season
Tasman Series	(New Zealand) Graham McRae	1971 Tasman Series
SCCA L&M Continental 5000 Championship	(United Kingdom) David Hobbs	1971 SCCA L&M Continental 5000 Championship
SCCA Formula Super Vee	(United States) Bill Scott	1971 SCCA Formula Super Vee season
Australian Drivers' Championship	(Australia) Max Stewart	1971 Australian Drivers' Championship
Australian Formula 2 Championship	(Australia) Henk Woelders	1971 Australian Formula 2 Championship
European Formula 5000 Championship	(Australia) Frank Gardner	1971 Rothmans F5000 European Championship
Cup of Peace and Friendship	(East Germany) Klaus-Peter Krause	1971 Cup of Peace and Friendship
Cup of Peace and Friendship	Nations: East Germany	1971 Cup of Peace and Friendship
Formula Nacional	(Spain) Paco Josa	1971 Formula Nacional
South African Formula One Championship	(South Africa) Dave Charlton	1971 South African Formula One Championship
Soviet Formula 2 Championship	(Soviet Union) Vladimir Grekov	1971 Soviet Formula 2 Championship
Soviet Formula 2 Championship	Teams: (Soviet Union) Spartak Krasnodar	1971 Soviet Formula 2 Championship
Formula Three
Lombank Formula 3 Championship (British F3)	(United Kingdom) Roger Williamson	1971 British Formula Three season
Shellsport Formula 3 Championship (British F3)	(Australia) David Walker	1971 British Formula Three season
Forward Trust Formula 3 Championship (British F3)	(Australia) David Walker	1971 British Formula Three season
East German Formula Three Championship	(East Germany) Wolfgang Küther	1971 East German Formula Three Championship
East German Formula Three Championship	LK II: (East Germany) Lothar Wolf	1971 East German Formula Three Championship
French Formula Three Championship	(France) Patrick Depailler	1971 French Formula Three Championship
French Formula Three Championship	Teams: (France) Automobiles Alpine	1971 French Formula Three Championship
German Formula Three Championship	(Germany) Manfred Mohr	1971 German Formula Three Championship
Italian Formula Three Championship	(Italy) Giancarlo Naddeo	1971 Italian Formula Three Championship
Soviet Formula 3 Championship	(Estonian Soviet Socialist Republic) Enn Griffel	1971 Soviet Formula 3 Championship
Formula Renault
Critérium de Formule Renault	(France) Michel Leclère	1971 Critérium de Formule Renault
Formula Ford
Australian Formula Ford Series	(Australia) Larry Perkins	1971 National Formula Ford Driver to Europe Series
Brazilian Formula Ford Championship	(Brazil) Francisco Lameirão	
Danish Formula Ford Championship	(Denmark) Jorgen Herlevsen	
Dutch Formula Ford 1600 Championship	(Netherlands) Huub Vermeulen	
Swedish Formula Ford Championship	(Sweden) Torsten Palm	

== Rallying ==
Series	Constructor	Season
International Championship for Manufacturers	(France) Alpine-Renault	International Championship for Manufacturers
Australian Rally Championship	(Australia) Colin Bond	1971 Australian Rally Championship
Australian Rally Championship	Co-Drivers: (Australia) George Shepheard	1971 Australian Rally Championship
British Rally Championship	(United Kingdom) Chris Sclater	1971 British Rally Championship
British Rally Championship	Co-Drivers: (United Kingdom) Martin Holmes	1971 British Rally Championship
Canadian Rally Championship	(Canada) Walter Boyce	1971 Canadian Rally Championship
Canadian Rally Championship	Co-Drivers: (Canada) Doug Woods	1971 Canadian Rally Championship
Deutsche Rallye Meisterschaft	(Germany) Achim Warmbold	
Estonian Rally Championship	(Estonian Soviet Socialist Republic) Valdo Mägi	1971 Estonian Rally Championship
Estonian Rally Championship	Co-Drivers: (Estonian Soviet Socialist Republic) Ülo Eismann	1971 Estonian Rally Championship
European Rally Championship	(Poland) Sobiesław Zasada	1971 European Rally Championship
European Rally Championship	Co-Drivers: (United Kingdom) Adam Wędrychowski	1971 European Rally Championship
Finnish Rally Championship	Group 1: (Finland) Eero Nuuttila	1971 Finnish Rally Championship
Finnish Rally Championship	Group 2: (Finland) Tapio Rainio	1971 Finnish Rally Championship
French Rally Championship	(France) Jean-Pierre Nicolas	
Italian Rally Championship	(Italy) Sergio Barbasio	
Italian Rally Championship	Co-Drivers: (Italy) Piero Sodano	
Italian Rally Championship	Manufacturers: (Italy) Lancia	
Polish Rally Championship	(Poland) Włodzimierz Markowski	
Romanian Rally Championship	(Romania) Aurel Puiu	
Scottish Rally Championship	(United Kingdom) Bob Watson	
Scottish Rally Championship	Co-Drivers: (United Kingdom) Hugh McNeil	
South African National Rally Championship	(South Africa) Elbie Odendaal	
South African National Rally Championship	Co-Drivers: (South Africa) Christo Kuun	
South African National Rally Championship	Manufacturers: (Italy) Alfa Romeo	
Spanish Rally Championship	(Spain) Lucas Sainz	
Spanish Rally Championship	Co-Drivers: (Spain) Juan Carlos Oroño	

== Sports car and GT ==
Series	Driver	Season
World Sportscar Championship	Class S & P: (West Germany) Porsche	1971 World Sportscar Championship
World Sportscar Championship	Class GT: (West Germany) Porsche	1971 World Sportscar Championship
Australian Sports Car Championship	(Australia) John Harvey	1971 Australian Sports Car Championship
Canadian American Challenge Cup	(United States) Peter Revson	1971 Can-Am season
Formula F100	(United Kingdom) Tom Pryce	1971 Formula F100 season
IMSA GT Championship	(United States) Hurley Haywood (United States) Peter Gregg	1971 IMSA GT Championship

== Stock car racing ==
Series	Driver	Season article
NASCAR Winston Cup Series	(United States) Richard Petty	1971 NASCAR Winston Cup Series
NASCAR Winston Cup Series	Manufacturers: (United States) Plymouth	1971 NASCAR Winston Cup Series
NASCAR Winston West Series	(United States) Ray Elder	1971 NASCAR Winston West Series
ARCA Racing Series	(United States) Ramo Stott	1971 ARCA Racing Series
Turismo Carretera	(Argentina) Rubén Luis di Palma	1971 Turismo Carretera
USAC Stock Car National Championship	(United States) Butch Hartman	1971 USAC Stock Car National Championship

== Touring car ==
Series	Driver	Season
Australian Manufacturers' Championship	(Australia) Holden	1971 Australian Manufacturers' Championship
Australian Touring Car Championship	(Australia) Bob Jane	1971 Australian Touring Car Championship
Trans-American Sedan Championship	Over 2.5L: (United States) American Motors	1971 Trans-Am season
Trans-American Sedan Championship	Under 2.5L: (Japan) Datsun	1971 Trans-Am season
British Saloon Car Championship	(United Kingdom) Bill McGovern	1971 British Saloon Car Championship
South Pacific Touring Series	(Australia) Colin Bond	1971 South Pacific Touring Series

== See also ==
- List of motorsport championships
- Auto racing
