= 1970 in motorsport =

The following is an overview of the events of 1970 in motorsport including the major racing events, motorsport venues that were opened and closed during a year, championships and non-championship events that were established and disestablished in a year, and births and deaths of racing drivers and other motorsport people.

== Annual events ==
The calendar includes only annual major non-championship events or annual events that had significance separate from the championship. For the dates of the championship events see related season articles.

Date	Event	Ref
31 January-1 February	9th 24 Hours of Daytona	
22 February	12th Daytona 500	
3 May	54th Targa Florio	
10 May	28th Monaco Grand Prix	
30 May	54th Indianapolis 500	
6–12 June	52nd Isle of Man TT	
13–14 June	38th 24 Hours of Le Mans	
27–28 June	1st 24 Hours of Nurburgring	
25–26 July	22nd 24 Hours of Spa	
4 October	11th Hardie-Ferodo 500	
29 November	17th Macau Grand Prix	

== Births ==
Date	Month	Name	Nationality	Occupation	Note	Ref
4	March	Àlex Crivillé	Spanish	Motorcycle racer	500cc Grand Prix motorcycle racing World champion (1999).	
30	March	Stéphane Ortelli	Monegasque	Racing driver	24 Hours of Le Mans winner (1998).	
15	September	Matthias Dolderer	German	Air racer	Red Bull Air World Race champion (2016).	
6	October	Fredrik Ekblom	Swedish	Racing driver	STCC champion in 1998, 2003, 2007.	

== Deaths ==
Date	Month	Name	Age	Nationality	Occupation	Note	Ref
15	February	Frank Clement	83	British	Racing driver	24 Hours of Le Mans winner (1924).	
2	June	Bruce McLaren	32	New Zealander	Racing driver	Founder of the McLaren. Winner of the 24 Hours of Le Mans (1966)	
30	June	Kelly Petillo	66	American	Racing driver	Indianapolis 500 winner (1935).	
5	September	Jochen Rindt	31	Austrian	Racing driver	The only posthumous Formula One World Champion. Winner of the 24 Hours of Le Mans (1965)	
2	November	Pierre Veyron	67	French	Racing driver	24 Hours of Le Mans winner (1939).	
22	November	Casimiro de Oliveira	63	Portuguese	Racing driver	The first Portuguese Formula One driver.	

== See also ==
- List of 1970 motorsport champions
