= 1970 SCCA Continental Championship =

Seasons
- ← 1969 1971 →

The 1970 SCCA Continental Championship was the fourth annual running of the Sports Car Club of America's professional open wheel racing series. The championship was open to Formula A cars, with both 305 cubic inch "stock block" V8 engines and 183 cubic inch "free design" engines being permitted in that category. For the first time in the history of the series, drivers competed for the L&M Championship Trophy and a share of a $40,000 prize fund. The championship was won by John Cannon driving a McLaren M10B Chevrolet.

The SCCA also organized a separate Continental Championship for Formula B cars.

== Race schedule ==
The championship was contested over a thirteen race series.

Race	Date	Name	Circuit	Distance	Winner	Car
1	April 19	Riverside Grand Prix	Riverside International Raceway	40 laps	(Canada) John Cannon	McLaren M10B - Chevrolet V8
2	May 24	Lucerne 100	Edmonton International Speedway	40 laps	(United States) Ron Grable	Lola T190 - Chevrolet V8
3	June 7	Seattle Grand Prix	Seattle International Raceway	45 laps	(Canada) John Cannon	McLaren M10B - Chevrolet V8
4	June 14	Monterey Grand Prix	Laguna Seca Raceway	50 laps	(United States) Ron Grable	Lola T190 - Chevrolet V8
5	June 28	Continental 49'er	Sears Point International Raceway	40 laps	(United States) Gus Hutchison	Brabham BT26A – Ford Cosworth DFV V8
6	July 5	Dallas Grand Prix	Dallas International Motor Speedway	41 laps	(United States) Gus Hutchison	Brabham BT26A – Ford Cosworth DFV V8
7	July 18	Road America Grand Prix	Road America	25 laps	(Canada) John Cannon	McLaren M10B - Chevrolet V8
8	August 1	Le Circuit Continental	Circuit Mont-Tremblant	35 laps	(United States) George Follmer	Lotus 70 - Ford V8
9	August 16	Minnesota Grand Prix	Brainerd International Raceway	50 laps	(United Kingdom) David Hobbs	Surtees TS5A - Chevrolet V8
10	September 7	Lime Rock Grand Prix	Lime Rock Park	70 laps	(United Kingdom) David Hobbs	Surtees TS5A - Chevrolet V8
11	September 13	Mosport Continental	Mosport Park	39 laps	(United States) Mark Donohue	Lola T192 - Chevrolet V8
12	September 27	Mid-Ohio Grand Prix	Mid-Ohio Sports Car Course	42 laps	(United States) George Follmer	Lotus 70 - Ford V8
13	October 25	L&M F5000 Championship Race	Sebring International Raceway	45 laps	(United States) Mark Donohue	Lola T192 - Chevrolet V8

== Points system ==
Championship points were awarded to drivers on a 20-15-12-10-8-6-4-3-2-1 basis for the first ten places in each race.

== Championship standings ==
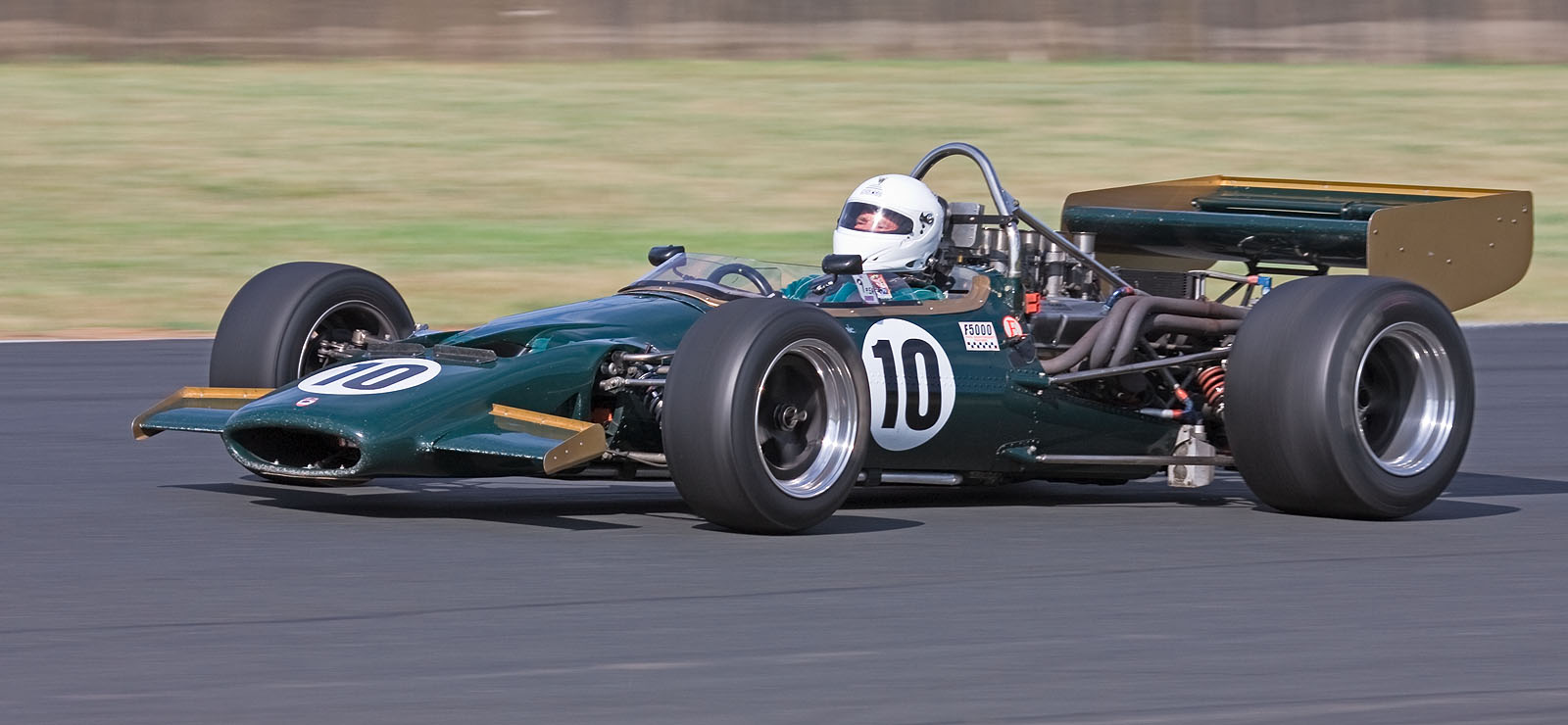
John Cannon won the 1970 SCCA Continental Championship driving a McLaren M10B, similar to that pictured above

Position	Driver	Car	Points
1	(Canada) John Cannon	McLaren M10B Chevrolet	129
2	(United States) Gus Hutchison	Brabham BT26 Ford Cosworth DFV	91
3	(United Kingdom) David Hobbs	Surtees TS5A Chevrolet	86
4	(Canada) Eppie Wietzes	McLaren M10B Chevrolet	81
5	(United States) Ron Grable	Lola T190 Chevrolet; Surtees TS5 Chevrolet	72
6	(United States) George Follmer	Lotus 70 Ford	71
7	(United States) John Gunn	Surtees TS5A Chevrolet	66
8	(United States) Mark Donohue	Lola T192 Chevrolet	52
9	(United States) Dick Smothers	Lotus 70 Chevrolet; Eagle Chevrolet	40
10	(Canada) Bill Brack	Lotus 70 Chevrolet	36
11	(United States) John Martin	Lotus 38 Chevrolet; Surtees TS5A Chevrolet	34
12	(United States) Dave Jordan	Eagle Chevrolet	29
13	(United States) George Wintersteen	Lotus 70 Chevrolet	28
14	(United States) Rex Ramsey	Eagle Chevrolet; Surtees TS5A Chevrolet	27
15	(United States) Fred Baker	McLaren M10A Chevrolet	26
=	(United States) Spence Stoddard	Lola T190 Chevrolet	26
17	(United States) Eric Haga	Lola T190 Chevrolet	22
18	(Japan) Hiroshi Fushida	Eagle Plymouth	20
19	(United States) Dow Byers	Lola T190 Chevrolet	18
20	(United States) Mike Brockman	Lola T190 Chevrolet	16
21	(United States) Mike Goth	Lola T190 Chevrolet	15
22	(United States) Gregg Young	McLaren M10A Chevrolet	13
23	(United States) Chuck Parsons	Lola T190 Chevrolet	12
24	(New Zealand) David Oxton	Lotus 70 Ford	10
25	(Canada) Horst Kroll	Lola T142 Chevrolet	8
26	(United States) Rich Galloway	Lola T190 Chevrolet	6
27	(United States) Kurt Reinhold	McKee Mk12 Chevrolet	4
=	(United States) Lyle Forsgren	Forsgrini Mk14B Chevrolet	4
29	(United States) Jim Paul	LeGrand Mk11 Chevrolet	3
30	(United States) Glenn Brown	McLaren Mk2 Chevrolet	2
=	(United States) John Saucier	Lola T142 Chevrolet	2
32	(United States) Gerard Raney	Eagle Chevrolet	1
=	(United States) Crockey Peterson	Coyote Chevrolet; Lola T142 Chevrolet	1
=	(United States) Peter Sherman	Lola T142 Chevrolet	1
=	(United States) Bob Stanford	McKee Mk7S Chevrolet	1
