= List of 1970 motorsport champions =

1970 motorsport champions
Previous: 1969	Next: 1971

This list of 1970 motorsport champions is a list of national or international auto racing series with a Championship decided by the points or positions earned by a driver from multiple races.

== Drag racing ==
Series	Champion	Refer
NHRA Drag Racing Series	Top Fuel: (United States) Ronnie Martin	1970 NHRA Drag Racing Series
NHRA Drag Racing Series	Funny Car: (United States) Gene Snow	1970 NHRA Drag Racing Series
NHRA Drag Racing Series	Pro Stock: (United States) Ronnie Sox	1970 NHRA Drag Racing Series

== Karting ==
Series	Driver	Season article
Karting World Championship	(Belgium) François Goldstein	
Karting World Championship	Junior: (United Kingdom) Alan Lane	
Karting European Championship	(Belgium) François Goldstein	

== Motorcycle racing ==
Series	Rider	Season
500cc World Championship	(Italy) Giacomo Agostini	1970 Grand Prix motorcycle racing season
350cc World Championship	(Italy) Giacomo Agostini	1970 Grand Prix motorcycle racing season
250cc World Championship	(United Kingdom) Rodney Gould	1970 Grand Prix motorcycle racing season
125cc World Championship	(West Germany) Dieter Braun	1970 Grand Prix motorcycle racing season
50cc World Championship	(Spain) Ángel Nieto	1970 Grand Prix motorcycle racing season
Speedway World Championship	(New Zealand) Ivan Mauger	1970 Individual Speedway World Championship

=== Motocross ===
Series	Rider	Season
FIM Motocross World Championship	500cc: (Sweden) Bengt Åberg	1970 FIM Motocross World Championship
FIM Motocross World Championship	250cc: (Belgium) Joël Robert	1970 FIM Motocross World Championship
Trans-AMA Motocross Series	(United Kingdom) Dave Nicoll	1970 Trans-AMA motocross series

== Open wheel racing ==
Series	Driver	Season
Formula One World Championship	(Austria) Jochen Rindt	1970 Formula One season
Formula One World Championship	Constructors: (United Kingdom) Lotus-Ford	1970 Formula One season
European Formula Two Championship	(Switzerland) Clay Regazzoni	1970 European Formula Two Championship
USAC National Championship	(United States) Al Unser	1970 USAC Championship Car season
Tasman Series	(New Zealand) Graeme Lawrence	1970 Tasman Series
Australian Drivers' Championship	(Australia) Leo Geoghegan	1970 Australian Drivers' Championship
Australian Formula 2 Championship	(Australia) Max Stewart	1970 Australian Formula 2 Championship
European Formula 5000 Championship	(United Kingdom) Peter Gethin	1970 Guards European Formula 5000 Championship
Cup of Peace and Friendship	(Czechoslovakia) Vladislav Ondřejík	1970 Cup of Peace and Friendship
Cup of Peace and Friendship	Nations: Czechoslovakia	1970 Cup of Peace and Friendship
SCCA Continental Championship	(Canada) John Cannon	1970 SCCA Continental Championship
South African Formula One Championship	(South Africa) Dave Charlton	1970 South African Formula One Championship
Formula Three
Lombank Formula 3 Championship (British F3)	(Australia) David Walker	1970 British Formula Three season
Shellsport Formula 3 Championship (British F3)	(United Kingdom) Tony Trimmer	1970 British Formula Three season
Forward Trust Formula 3 Championship (British F3)	(Brazil) Carlos Pace	1970 British Formula Three season
East German Formula Three Championship	(East Germany) Klaus-Peter Krause	1970 East German Formula Three Championship
East German Formula Three Championship	LK II: (East Germany) Siegfried Bubenik	1970 East German Formula Three Championship
French Formula Three Championship	(France) Jean-Pierre Jaussaud	1970 French Formula Three Championship
French Formula Three Championship	Teams: (France) Volant Shell/Winfield	1970 French Formula Three Championship
Italian Formula Three Championship	(Italy) Giovanni Salvati	1970 Italian Formula Three Championship
Soviet Formula 3 Championship	(Soviet Union) Vladimir Grekov	1970 Soviet Formula 3 Championship
Formula Ford
Australian Formula Ford Series	(Australia) Richard Knight	1970 Formula Ford National Series
Dutch Formula Ford 1600 Championship	(Netherlands) Huub Vermeulen	1970 Dutch Formula Ford 1600 Championship
Swedish Formula Ford Championship	(Sweden) Torsten Palm	

== Rallying ==
Series	Driver	Season article
Australian Rally Championship	(Australia) Bob Watson	1970 Australian Rally Championship
Australian Rally Championship	Co-Drivers: (Australia) Jim McAuliffe	1970 Australian Rally Championship
British Rally Championship	(United Kingdom) Will Sparrow	1970 British Rally Championship
British Rally Championship	Co-Drivers: (United Kingdom) Nigel Raeburn	1970 British Rally Championship
Canadian Rally Championship	(Canada) Walter Boyce	1970 Canadian Rally Championship
Canadian Rally Championship	Co-Drivers: (Canada) Doug Woods	1970 Canadian Rally Championship
Deutsche Rallye Meisterschaft	(Germany) Helmut Bein	
Estonian Rally Championship	(Estonian Soviet Socialist Republic) Valdo Mägi	1970 Estonian Rally Championship
Estonian Rally Championship	Co-Drivers: (Estonian Soviet Socialist Republic) Ülo Eismann	1970 Estonian Rally Championship
European Rally Championship	(France) Jean-Claude Andruet	1970 European Rally Championship
European Rally Championship	Co-Drivers: (United Kingdom) David Stone	1970 European Rally Championship
Finnish Rally Championship	Group 1: (Finland) Eero Nuuttila	1970 Finnish Rally Championship
Finnish Rally Championship	Group 2: (Finland) Timo Mäkinen	1970 Finnish Rally Championship
French Rally Championship	(France) Jean-Claude Andruet	
Italian Rally Championship	(Italy) Alcide Paganelli	
Italian Rally Championship	Co-Drivers: (Italy) Ninni Russo	
Italian Rally Championship	Manufacturers: (Italy) Fiat	
Polish Rally Championship	(Poland) Adam Masłowiec	
Romanian Rally Championship	(Romania) Aurel Puiu	
Scottish Rally Championship	(United Kingdom) James Rae	
Scottish Rally Championship	Co-Drivers: (United Kingdom) Michael Malcolm	
South African National Rally Championship	(South Africa) Ewold van Bergen	
South African National Rally Championship	Co-Drivers: (South Africa) Minota van Bergen	
South African National Rally Championship	Manufacturers: (Italy) Alfa Romeo	
Spanish Rally Championship	(Spain) Ruiz Giménez	
Spanish Rally Championship	Co-Drivers: (Spain) Rafael Castañeda	

== Sports car and GT ==
Series	Driver	Season
International Championship for Makes	(West Germany) Porsche	1970 World Sportscar Championship
International Grand Touring Trophy	(West Germany) Porsche	1970 World Sportscar Championship
Canadian American Challenge Cup	(New Zealand) Denny Hulme	1970 Can-Am season
Australian Sports Car Championship	(Australia) Peter Woodward	1970 Australian Sports Car Championship
Formula F100	(United Kingdom) Ray Allen	1970 Formula F100 season

== Stock car racing ==
Series	Driver	Season article
NASCAR Grand National Series	(United States) Bobby Isaac	1970 NASCAR Grand National Series
NASCAR Grand National Series	Manufacturers: (United States) Dodge	1970 NASCAR Grand National Series
NASCAR Winston West Series	(United States) Ray Elder	1970 NASCAR Winston West Series
ARCA Racing Series	(United States) Ramo Stott	1970 ARCA Racing Series
Turismo Carretera	(Argentina) Rubén Luis di Palma	1970 Turismo Carretera
USAC Stock Car National Championship	(United States) Roger McCluskey	1970 USAC Stock Car National Championship

== Touring car ==
Series	Driver	Season
Australian Touring Car Championship	(Australia) Norm Beechey	1970 Australian Touring Car Championship
Trans-American Sedan Championship	Over 2.0L: (United States) Ford	1970 Trans-American Sedan Championship
Trans-American Sedan Championship	Under 2.0L: (Italy) Alfa Romeo	1970 Trans-American Sedan Championship
British Saloon Car Championship	(United Kingdom) Bill McGovern	1970 British Saloon Car Championship
Tasman Touring Series	(Canada) Allan Moffat	1970 Tasman Touring Series
Tasman Touring Series	Manufacturers: (United States) Ford	1970 Tasman Touring Series

== See also ==
- List of motorsport championships
- Auto racing
