= List of 1966 motorsport champions =

1966 motorsport champions
Previous: 1965	Next: 1967

This list of 1966 motorsport champions is a list of national or international auto racing series with a Championship decided by the points or positions earned by a driver from multiple races.

== Drag racing ==
Series	Champion	Refer
NHRA Drag Racing Series	Top Fuel: (United States) Pete Robinson	1966 NHRA Drag Racing Series
NHRA Drag Racing Series	Funny Car: (United States) Ed Schartman	1966 NHRA Drag Racing Series

== Karting ==
Series	Driver	Season article
Karting World Championship	(Italy) Susanna Raganelli	1966 Karting World Championship

== Motorcycle racing ==
Series	Rider	Season
500cc World Championship	(Italy) Giacomo Agostini	1966 Grand Prix motorcycle racing season
350cc World Championship	(United Kingdom) Mike Hailwood	1966 Grand Prix motorcycle racing season
250cc World Championship	(United Kingdom) Mike Hailwood	1966 Grand Prix motorcycle racing season
125cc World Championship	(Switzerland) Luigi Taveri	1966 Grand Prix motorcycle racing season
50cc World Championship	(West Germany) Hans-Georg Anscheidt	1966 Grand Prix motorcycle racing season
Speedway World Championship	(New Zealand) Barry Briggs	1966 Individual Speedway World Championship

== Open wheel racing ==
Series	Driver	Season
Formula One World Championship	(Australia) Jack Brabham	1966 Formula One season
Formula One World Championship	Constructors: (United Kingdom) Brabham-Repco	1966 Formula One season
Australian Drivers' Championship	(Australia) Spencer Martin	1966 Australian Drivers' Championship
Australian 1½ Litre Championship	(Australia) John Harvey	
Cup of Peace and Friendship	(East Germany) Heinz Melkus	1966 Cup of Peace and Friendship
Cup of Peace and Friendship	Nations: East Germany	1966 Cup of Peace and Friendship
South African Formula One Championship	(Rhodesia) John Love	1966 South African Formula One Championship
Tasman Series	(United Kingdom) Jackie Stewart	1966 Tasman Series
USAC National Championship	(United States) Mario Andretti	1966 USAC Championship Car season
Formula Three
Les Leston British Formula Three Championship	(United Kingdom) Harry Stiller	
East German Formula Three Championship	(East Germany) Willy Lehmann	1966 East German Formula Three Championship
French Formula Three Championship	(France) Johnny Servoz-Gavin	
French Formula Three Championship	Teams: (France) Equipe Matra Sports	
Italian Formula Three Championship	(Italy) Tino Brambilla	
Italian Formula Three Championship	Teams: (Italy) Scuderia Madunina	
Soviet Formula 3 Championship	(Soviet Union) Viktor Lapin	1966 Soviet Formula 3 Championship

== Rallying ==
Series	Drivers	Season article
British Rally Championship	(United Kingdom) Roy Fidler	1966 British Rally Championship
British Rally Championship	Co-Drivers: (United Kingdom) Alan Taylor	1966 British Rally Championship
Canadian Rally Championship	(Canada) Bruce Simpson	1966 Canadian Rally Championship
Estonian Rally Championship	(Estonian Soviet Socialist Republic) Enno Luik	1966 Estonian Rally Championship
Estonian Rally Championship	Co-Drivers: (Estonian Soviet Socialist Republic) Valdo Kuusik	1966 Estonian Rally Championship
European Rally Championship	Group 1: (Sweden) Lillebror Nasenius	1966 European Rally Championship
European Rally Championship	Group 1 Co-Drivers: (Sweden) Fergus Sager	1966 European Rally Championship
European Rally Championship	Group 2: (Poland) Sobiesław Zasada	1966 European Rally Championship
European Rally Championship	Group 2 Co-Drivers: (Poland) Ewa Zasada	1966 European Rally Championship
European Rally Championship	Group 3: (Germany) Günter Klass	1966 European Rally Championship
European Rally Championship	Group 3 Co-Drivers: (Germany) Rolf Wütherich	1966 European Rally Championship
Finnish Rally Championship	(Finland) Timo Mäkinen	1966 Finnish Rally Championship
Italian Rally Championship	(Italy) Leo Cella	
Italian Rally Championship	Co-Drivers: (Italy) Sergio Barbasio	
Italian Rally Championship	Manufacturers: (Italy) Lancia	
South African National Rally Championship	(South Africa) Francis Tucker	
South African National Rally Championship	Co-Drivers: (South Africa) Raggy Schjolberg	
Spanish Rally Championship	(Spain) Juan Fernández	
Spanish Rally Championship	Co-Drivers: (Spain) Vidal-Ribas	

== Sports car and GT ==
Series	Manufacturer	Season
International Manufacturers Championship	Class P+2.0: (United States) Ford	1966 World Sportscar Championship
International Manufacturers Championship	Class P2.0: (West Germany) Porsche	1966 World Sportscar Championship
International Sports Car Championship	Class S+2.0: (United States) Ford	1966 World Sportscar Championship
International Sports Car Championship	Class S2.0: (West Germany) Porsche	1966 World Sportscar Championship
International Sports Car Championship	Class S1.3: (Italy) Abarth	1966 World Sportscar Championship
Canadian American Challenge Cup	(United Kingdom) John Surtees	1966 Can-Am season
United States Road Racing Championship	(United States) Chuck Parsons	1966 United States Road Racing Championship

== Stock car racing ==
Series	Driver	Season article
NASCAR Grand National Series	(United States) David Pearson	1966 NASCAR Grand National Series
NASCAR Grand National Series	Manufacturers: (United States) Ford	1966 NASCAR Grand National Series
NASCAR Pacific Coast Late Model Series	(United States) Jack McCoy	1966 NASCAR Pacific Coast Late Model Series
ARCA Racing Series	(United States) Iggy Katona	1966 ARCA Racing Series
Turismo Carretera	(Argentina) Juan Manuel Bordeu	1966 Turismo Carretera
USAC Stock Car National Championship	(United States) Norm Nelson	1966 USAC Stock Car National Championship

== Touring car ==
Series	Driver/Manufacturer	Season
European Touring Car Challenge	Div.3 (Germany) Hubert Hahne	1966 European Touring Car Challenge
European Touring Car Challenge	Div.3 Teams: (Germany) BMW	1966 European Touring Car Challenge
European Touring Car Challenge	Div.2 (Italy) Andrea de Adamich	1966 European Touring Car Challenge
European Touring Car Challenge	Div.2 Teams: (Italy) Alfa Romeo	1966 European Touring Car Challenge
European Touring Car Challenge	Div.1 (Italy) Giancarlo Baghetti	1966 European Touring Car Challenge
European Touring Car Challenge	Div.1 Teams: (Italy) Abarth	1966 European Touring Car Challenge
Australian Touring Car Championship	(Australia) Ian Geoghegan	1966 Australian Touring Car Championship
Trans-American Sedan Championship	Over 2.0: (United States) Ford	1966 Trans-Am season
Trans-American Sedan Championship	Under 2.0: (Italy) Alfa Romeo	1966 Trans-Am season
British Saloon Car Championship	(United Kingdom) John Fitzpatrick	1966 British Saloon Car Championship
British Saloon Car Championship	Teams: (United Kingdom) Team Lotus	1966 British Saloon Car Championship

== See also ==
- List of motorsport championships
- Auto racing
