= 1970 Guards European Formula 5000 Championship =

Seasons
- ← 1969 1971 →

The 1970 Guards European Formula 5000 Championship was a motor racing competition for Formula 5000 cars. The series was organized in the United Kingdom by the British Racing and Sports Car Club but also included European rounds. It was the first and only series to carry the Guards European Formula 5000 Championship name and the second of seven annual European Formula 5000 Championships to be contested between 1969 and 1975. The title was won by Peter Gethin, driving a McLaren M10B.

== Calendar ==
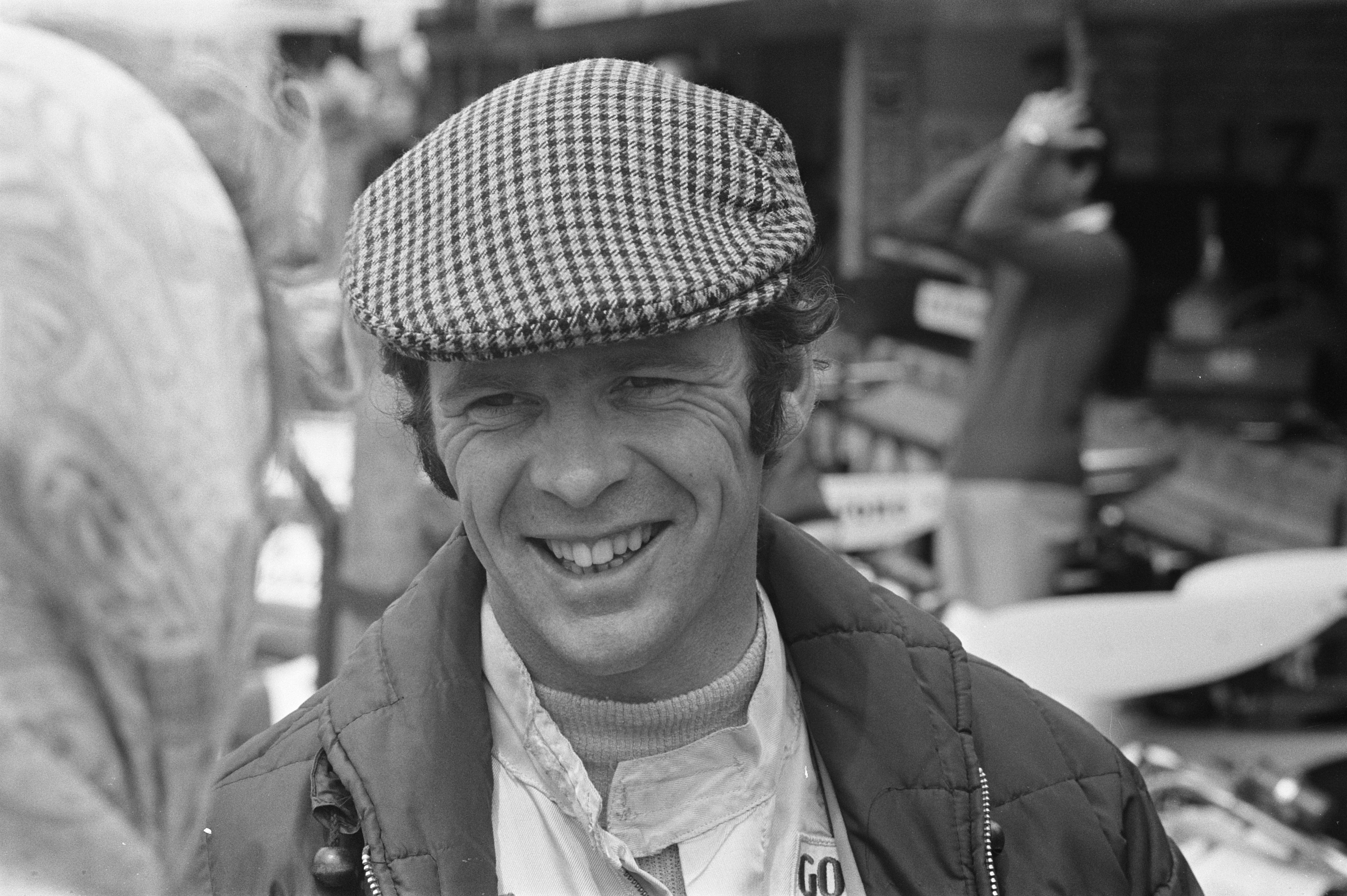
Championship winner Peter Gethin, pictured in 1971

The championship was contested over twenty rounds with each round staged over two heats.

Round	Name	Distance (miles)	Circuit	Country	Date	Winning driver	Car
1		110	Oulton Park	United Kingdom	27 March	Mike Walker	McLaren M10B Chevrolet
2		106	Brands Hatch	United Kingdom	30 March	Peter Gethin	McLaren M10B Chevrolet
3	North Sea Trophy	104	Zolder	Belgium	5 April	Peter Gethin	McLaren M10B Chevrolet
4		104	Zandvoort	Netherlands	19 April	Peter Gethin	McLaren M10B Chevrolet
5	Daily Express / GKN International Trophy	150	Silverstone	United Kingdom	26 April	Mike Hailwood	Lola T190 Chevrolet
6		62	Brands Hatch (Club Circuit)	United Kingdom	3 May	Peter Gethin	McLaren M10B Chevrolet
7		55	Castle Combe	United Kingdom	9 May	Peter Gethin	McLaren M10B Chevrolet
8		64	Mallory Park	United Kingdom	25 May	Peter Gethin	McLaren M10B Chevrolet
9	Rothmans Grand Prix	106	Mondello Park	Ireland	1 June	Trevor Taylor	Surtees TS5A Chevrolet
10	Martini Trophy	104	Silverstone	United Kingdom	6 June	Peter Gethin	McLaren M10B Chevrolet
11	Lottery Grand Prix	143	Monza	Italy	21 June	Mike Walker	McLaren M10B Chevrolet
12	Anderstorp 5000	105	Scandinavian Raceway	Sweden	28 June	Peter Gethin	McLaren M10B Chevrolet
13	Olympia Trophy	132	Salzburgring	Austria	12 July	Mike Hailwood	Lola T190 Chevrolet
14	Kodak Super 8 Trophy	71	Thruxton	United Kingdom	9 August	Frank Gardner	Lola T190 Chevrolet
15	Automotive Products Trophy	59	Silverstone	United Kingdom	15 August	Frank Gardner	Lola T190 Chevrolet
16	Gold Cup	110	Oulton Park	United Kingdom	22 August	Howden Ganley	McLaren M10B Chevrolet
17		65	Snetterton	United Kingdom	31 August	Reine Wisell	McLaren M10B Chevrolet
18	Preis der Nationen	126	Hockenheimring	West Germany	13 September	Reine Wisell	McLaren M10B Chevrolet
19		66	Oulton Park	United Kingdom	19 September	Reine Wisell	McLaren M10B Chevrolet
20		80	Brands Hatch	United Kingdom	27 September	Graham McRae	McLaren M10B Chevrolet

== Points system ==
Championship points were awarded on a 9-6-4-3-2-1 basis for the first six places at each round. Final championship positions were determined from the best ten results from the longer rounds (i.e. those contested over greater than 100 miles) and the best four results from the shorter rounds.

== Championship standings ==
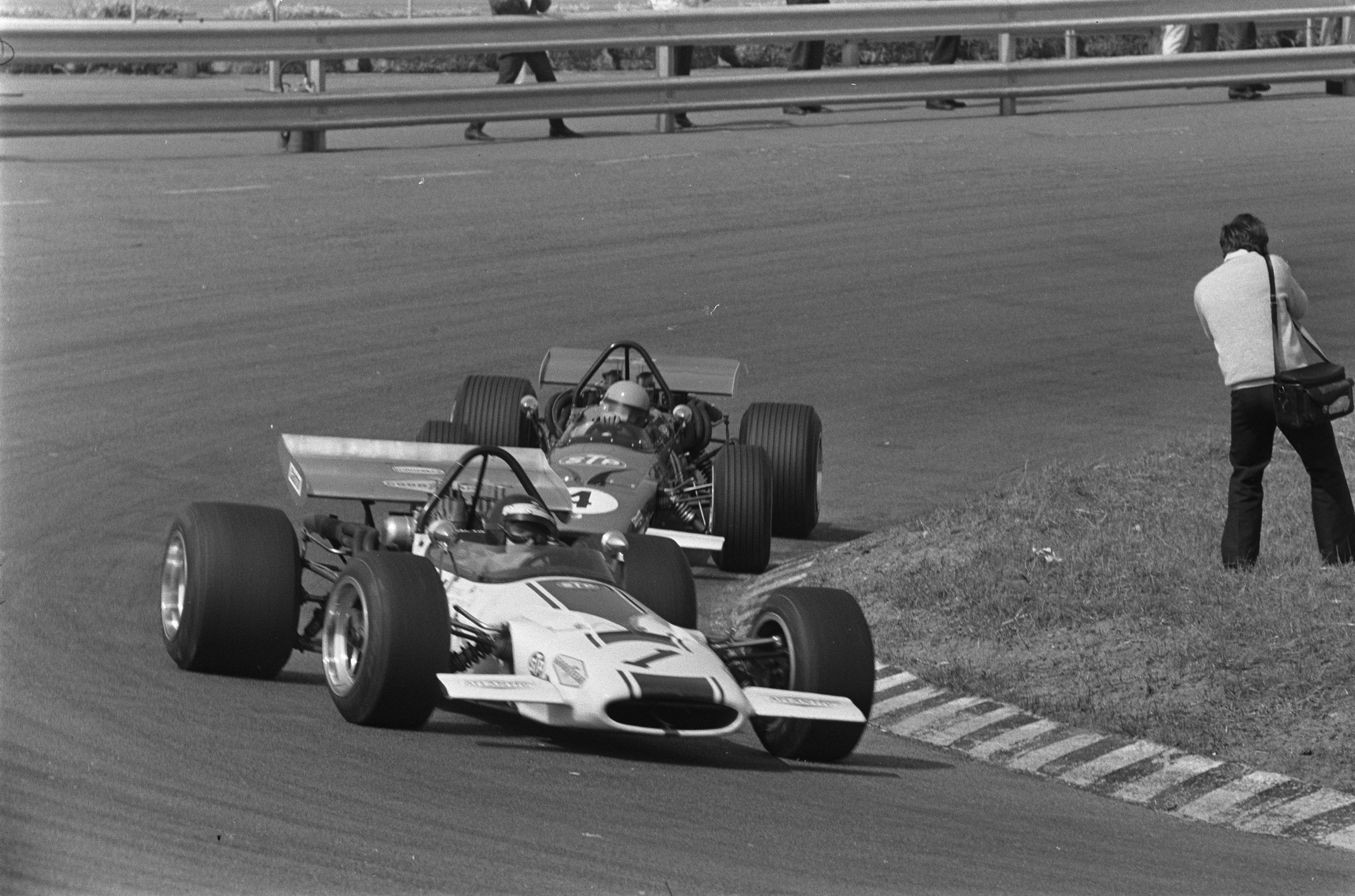
Peter Gethin won the championship driving a McLaren M10B

Position	Driver	Car	Entrant	Points
1	(United Kingdom) Peter Gethin	McLaren M10B Chevrolet	Sid Taylor	90
2	(New Zealand) Howden Ganley	McLaren M10B Chevrolet	Barry Newman	61
3	(Australia) Frank Gardner	Lola T190 Chevrolet	Motor Racing Research Ltd	52
4	(United Kingdom) Mike Hailwood	Lola T190 Chevrolet; Lola T192 Chevrolet	Epstein-Cuthbert Team Lola	50
5	(United Kingdom) Mike Walker	McLaren M10B Chevrolet	Alan McKechnie Racing	42
6	(New Zealand) Graham McRae	McLaren M10B Chevrolet	Crown Lynn Potteries	36
7	(United Kingdom) Trevor Taylor	Surtees TS5A Chevrolet; Lola T192 Chevrolet	Team Surtees; Doug Hardwick	33
=	(Sweden) Reine Wisell	McLaren M10B Chevrolet	Sid Taylor	33
9	(United States) Roy Pike	Leda LT20; Leda LT22 Chevrolet	Malaya Garage	17
10	(United Kingdom) David Prophet	McLaren M10B Chevrolet		11
11	(Sweden) Ulf Norinder	Lola T190 Chevrolet	Sports Cars Switzerland	10
12	(United Kingdom) Keith Holland	Lola T142 Chevrolet	Alan Fraser	8
=	(United Kingdom) Davey Powell	Lola T190 Chevrolet; Lola T142 Chevrolet	Doug Hardwick	8
14	(United Kingdom) Gordon Spice	Kitchiner K3A Ford		7
15	(United Kingdom) Fred Saunders	Crosslé 15F Rover	Mermaid Racing	6
16	(United Kingdom) Kaye Griffiths	Lola T142 Chevrolet		5
17	(United Kingdom) Willie Forbes	Lola T142 Chevrolet		4
=	(United Kingdom) Alan Rollinson	Lotus 70 Chevrolet; Lotus 70 Ford; Surtees TS5A Chevrolet	Lotus Components Irish Racing Cars	4
19	(United Kingdom) David Hobbs	Surtees TS5A Chevrolet	Team Surtees	2
=	(United Kingdom) Derrick Williams	Lola T142 Chevrolet		2
=	(United Kingdom) Ray Calcutt	Lola T142 Chevrolet	Alan Fraser	2
22	(United Kingdom) Morris Nunn	Lola T190 Chevrolet	Doug Hardwick	1
=	(Republic of Ireland) Lingard Goulding	Lola T142 Chevrolet; Beattie P1100 Chevrolet		1
=	(United Kingdom) Tony Lanfranchi	Lola T190 Chevrolet	Sports Cars Switzerland	1
