= 1968 in motorsport =

The following is an overview of the events of 1968 in motorsport including the major racing events, motorsport venues that were opened and closed during a year, championships and non-championship events that were established and disestablished in a year, and births and deaths of racing drivers and other motorsport people.

== Annual events ==
The calendar includes only annual major non-championship events or annual events that had significance separate from the championship. For the dates of the championship events see related season articles.

| Date | Event | Ref |
|---|---|---|
| 3–4 February | 7th 24 Hours of Daytona | |
| 25 February | 10th Daytona 500 | |
| 5 May | 52nd Targa Florio | |
| 26 May | 26th Monaco Grand Prix | |
| 30 May | 52nd Indianapolis 500 | |
| 8–14 June | 50th Isle of Man TT | |
| 20–21 July | 20th 24 Hours of Spa | |
| 28–29 September | 36th 24 Hours of Le Mans | |
| 6 October | 9th Hardie-Ferodo 500 | |
| 17 November | 15th Macau Grand Prix | |

== Births ==
| Date | Month | Name | Nationality | Occupation | Note | Ref |
|---|---|---|---|---|---|---|
| 5 | February | Marcus Grönholm | Finnish | Rally driver | World Rally champion (2000, 2002). | |
| 8 | March | Michael Bartels | German | Racing driver | Champion of the FIA GT Championship in 2006, 2008-2009 and FIA GT1 World Championship in 2010. | |
| 20 | March | John Kocinski | American | Motorcycle racer | Superbike World champion (1997). | |
| 5 | August | Colin McRae | British | Rally driver | World Rally champion (1995). | |
| 28 | September | Mika Häkkinen | Finnish | Racing driver | Formula One World Champion (1998, 1999). | |

== Deaths ==
| Date | Month | Name | Age | Nationality | Occupation | Note | Ref |
|---|---|---|---|---|---|---|---|
| 19 | January | Ray Harroun | 89 | American | Racing driver | Indianapolis 500 winner (1911). | |
| 7 | April | Jim Clark | 32 | British | Racing driver | Formula One World Champion (1963, 1965). Winner of the 1965 Indianapolis 500. | |
| 8 | June | Ludovico Scarfiotti | 34 | Italian | Racing driver | 1966 Italian Grand Prix winner. Winner of the 24 Hours of Le Mans (1963). | |

== See also ==
- List of 1968 motorsport champions
