= 1971 SCCA L&M Continental 5000 Championship =

Seasons
- ← 1970 1972 →

The 1971 SCCA L&M Continental 5000 Championship was the fifth annual running of the Sports Car Club of America's professional open wheel racing series. Liggett & Myers increased its support of the championship for 1971 through its L&M cigarette brand and now had series naming rights.

The championship was won by David Hobbs, driving a McLaren M10B Chevrolet.

== Calendar ==
The championship was contested over eight races with two heats per race.

Round	Date	Event name	Event location	Duration	Winning driver	Vehicle
1	25 April	Riverside Grand Prix	Riverside International Raceway	77 laps	(Australia) Frank Matich	McLaren M10B – Repco Holden V8
2	2 May	Monterey Grand Prix	Laguna Seca Raceway	80 laps	(United Kingdom) David Hobbs	McLaren M10B – Chevrolet V8
3	23 May	Seattle Grand Prix	Seattle International Raceway	80 laps	(United Kingdom) David Hobbs	McLaren M10B – Chevrolet V8
4	5 July	Mid-Ohio Grand Prix	Mid-Ohio Sports Car Course	60 laps	(United States) Sam Posey	Surtees TS8 – Chevrolet V8
5	18 July	Road America Grand Prix	Road America	48 laps	(United Kingdom) David Hobbs	McLaren M10B – Chevrolet V8
6	1 August	Lucerne 100	Edmonton International Speedway	50 laps	(United Kingdom) David Hobbs	McLaren M10B – Chevrolet V8
7	15 August	Minnesota Grand Prix	Brainerd International Raceway	60 laps	(United States) Brett Lunger	Lola T192 – Chevrolet V8
8	6 September	Lime Rock Grand Prix	Lime Rock Park	66 laps	(United Kingdom) David Hobbs	McLaren M10B – Chevrolet V8

== Points system ==
Championship points were awarded to drivers on a 20-15-12-10-8-6-4-3-2-1 basis for the first ten places in each race, those places having been determined from the results of the two heats. Total points for each driver were based on the best six finishes.

== Championship results ==
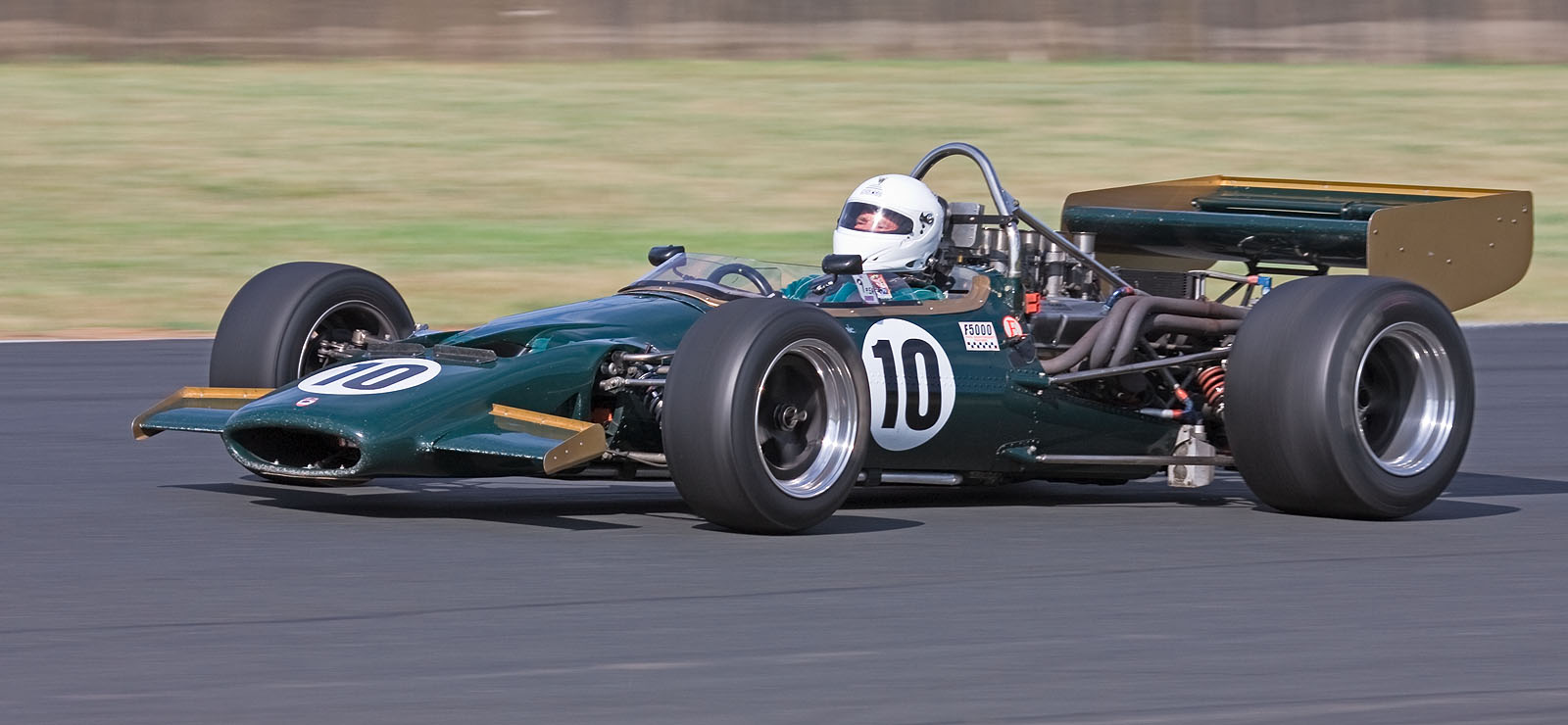
David Hobbs won the 1971 L&M Continental 5000 Championship driving a McLaren M10B, similar to that pictured above

Position	Driver	Car	Points
1	(United Kingdom) David Hobbs	McLaren M10B Chevrolet	119
2	(United States) Sam Posey	Surtees TS8 Chevrolet	70
3	(United States) Brett Lunger	Lola T192 Chevrolet	64
4	(Canada) Eppie Wietzes	McLaren M18 Chevrolet	59
5	(United States) Jim Dittemore	Lola T192 Chevrolet	41
6	(Australia) Frank Matich	McLaren M10B Repco Holden	35
7	(United States) Ron Grable	Lola T190 Chevrolet & American Mk1 Chevrolet	30
8	(United States) Gregg Young	Surtees TS7 Ford Cosworth DFV	28
9	(United States) Lothar Motschenbacher	McLaren M18 Chevrolet	26
10	(Canada) Bill Brack	Lotus 70 Chevrolet	23
11	(United States) Gerard Raney	Eagle Chevrolet	21
12	(United States) John Gunn	Eagle Chevrolet	20
13	(United States) Skip Barber	March 701 Ford Cosworth DFV & March 711 Ford Cosworth DFV	18
14	(United States) Jerry Hansen	Lola T192 Chevrolet	17
15	(United States) Evan Noyes	McLaren M18 Chevrolet	10
16	(Canada) Horst Kroll	Lola T142 Chevrolet	9
=	(United States) Jack Eiteljorg	Lola T192 Chevrolet	9
18	(United States) Monte Shelton	Eagle Chevrolet	8
=	(United States) Merle Brennan	McLaren M10A Chevrolet	8
20	(United States) Pete Lovely	Lotus 49B Ford Cosworth DFV	6
21	(United States) Jon Milledge	McLaren M10A Chevrolet	4
=	(United States) Barry Blackmore	McLaren M10A Chevrolet	4
=	(United States) Bud Morley	Lola T192 Chevrolet	4
24	(United States) Dave Jordan	Eagle Chevrolet	3
=	(United States) Dennis Ott	McLaren M10B Chevrolet	3
26	(United States) Ed Felter	Lola T190 Chevrolet	2
=	(United States) Bill Gubelmann	March 712M Ford BDA	2
28	(United States) Jon Ward	Nova Mk 1 Chevrolet	1
=	(United States) Mike Brockman	Lola T190 Chevrolet	1
=	(United States) Ronnie Bucknum	Lola T190 Chevrolet	1
=	(Italy) Nick Dioguardi	Surtees TS5 Chevrolet	1
=	(United States) Chris Cook	Surtees TS5 Chevrolet	1

== See also ==
- 1971 Questor Grand Prix - Many Continental Championship competitors also raced in this non-championship race
