= List of 1968 motorsport champions =

1968 motorsport champions
Previous: 1967	Next: 1969

This list of 1968 motorsport champions is a list of national or international auto racing series with a Championship decided by the points or positions earned by a driver from multiple races.

== Drag racing ==
Series	Champion	Refer
NHRA Drag Racing Series	Top Fuel: (United States) Bennie Osborn	1968 NHRA Drag Racing Series

== Karting ==
Series	Driver	Season article
Karting World Championship	(Sweden) Tomas Nilsson	
Karting World Championship	Junior: (Italy) Amedeo Pacitto	

== Motorcycle racing ==
Series	Rider	Season
500cc World Championship	(Italy) Giacomo Agostini	1968 Grand Prix motorcycle racing season
350cc World Championship	(Italy) Giacomo Agostini	1968 Grand Prix motorcycle racing season
250cc World Championship	(United Kingdom) Phil Read	1968 Grand Prix motorcycle racing season
125cc World Championship	(United Kingdom) Phil Read	1968 Grand Prix motorcycle racing season
50cc World Championship	(West Germany) Hans-Georg Anscheidt	1968 Grand Prix motorcycle racing season
Speedway World Championship	(New Zealand) Ivan Mauger	1968 Individual Speedway World Championship

== Open wheel racing ==
Series	Driver	Season
Formula One World Championship	(United Kingdom) Graham Hill	1968 Formula One season
Formula One World Championship	Constructors: (United Kingdom) Lotus-Ford	1968 Formula One season
European Formula Two Championship	(France) Jean-Pierre Beltoise	1968 European Formula Two Championship
USAC National Championship	(United States) Bobby Unser	1968 USAC Championship Car season
SCCA Grand Prix Championship	(United States) Lou Sell	1968 SCCA Grand Prix Championship
Tasman Series	(United Kingdom) Jim Clark	1968 Tasman Series
Australian Drivers' Championship	(Australia) Kevin Bartlett	1968 Australian Drivers' Championship
Australian 1½ Litre Championship	(Australia) Garrie Cooper (tied) (Australia) Max Stewart (tied)	1968 Australian 1½ Litre Championship
Cup of Peace and Friendship	(Czech Republic) Miroslav Fousek	1968 Cup of Peace and Friendship
South African Formula One Championship	(Rhodesia) John Love	1968 South African Formula One Championship
Formula Three
Lombank British Formula Three Championship	(Australia) Tim Schenken	
East German Formula Three Championship	(East Germany) Heinz Melkus	1968 East German Formula Three Championship
East German Formula Three Championship	LK II: (East Germany) Manfred Berger	1968 East German Formula Three Championship
French Formula Three Championship	(France) François Cevert	
French Formula Three Championship	Teams: (France) Volant Shell	
Italian Formula Three Championship	(Italy) Franco Bernabei	
Soviet Formula 3 Championship	(Estonian Soviet Socialist Republic) Enn Griffel	1968 Soviet Formula 3 Championship
Formula Ford
Scottish Formula Ford Championship	(Australia) David Walker	

== Rallying ==
Series	Driver/Co-Driver	Season
Australian Rally Championship	(Australia) Harry Firth	1968 Australian Rally Championship
Australian Rally Championship	Co-Drivers: (Australia) Graham Hoinville	1968 Australian Rally Championship
British Rally Championship	(United Kingdom) Colin Malkin	1968 British Rally Championship
British Rally Championship	Co-Drivers: (United Kingdom) John Brown	1968 British Rally Championship
Canadian Rally Championship	(Canada) Keith Ronald	1968 Canadian Rally Championship
Canadian Rally Championship	Co-Drivers: (Canada) John Slade	1968 Canadian Rally Championship
Estonian Rally Championship	(Estonian Soviet Socialist Republic) Toomas Bernstein	1968 Estonian Rally Championship
Estonian Rally Championship	Co-Drivers: (Estonian Soviet Socialist Republic) Heino Sepp	1968 Estonian Rally Championship
European Rally Championship	(Finland) Pauli Toivonen	1968 European Rally Championship
European Rally Championship	Co-Drivers: (Finland) Martti Tiukkanen	1968 European Rally Championship
Finnish Rally Championship	(Finland) Hannu Mikkola	1968 Finnish Rally Championship
French Rally Championship	(France) Jean-Claude Andruet	1968 French Rally Championship
Italian Rally Championship	(Italy) Arnaldo Cavallari	
Italian Rally Championship	Co-Drivers: (Italy) Dante Salvay	
Italian Rally Championship	Manufacturers: (Italy) Lancia	
Polish Rally Championship	(Poland) Sobiesław Zasada	
Scottish Rally Championship	(United Kingdom) Mike Hibbert	
Scottish Rally Championship	Co-Drivers: (United Kingdom) Ian Withers	
South African National Rally Championship	(South Africa) Jan Hettema	
South African National Rally Championship	Co-Drivers: (South Africa) Raggy Schjolberg	
South African National Rally Championship	Manufacturers: (Sweden) Volvo	
Spanish Rally Championship	(France) Bernard Tramont	
Spanish Rally Championship	Co-Drivers: (Spain) Ricardo Muñoz	

== Sports car and GT ==
Series	Manufacturer	Season
International Championship for Makes	(United States) Ford	1968 World Sportscar Championship
International Grand Touring Trophy	(West Germany) Porsche	1968 World Sportscar Championship
Canadian American Challenge Cup	(New Zealand) Denny Hulme	1968 Can-Am season
Trans-Am Series	Over 2-liter: (United States) Chevrolet	1968 Trans-American Championship
Trans-Am Series	Under 2-liter: (Germany) Porsche	1968 Trans-American Championship
United States Road Racing Championship	(United States) Mark Donohue	1968 United States Road Racing Championship

== Stock car racing ==
Series	Driver	Season article
NASCAR Grand National Series	(United States) David Pearson	1968 NASCAR Grand National Series
NASCAR Grand National Series	Manufacturers: (United States) Ford	1968 NASCAR Grand National Series
NASCAR Pacific Coast Late Model Series	(United States) Scotty Cain	1968 NASCAR Pacific Coast Late Model Series
ARCA Racing Series	(United States) Benny Parsons	1968 ARCA Racing Series
Turismo Carretera	(Argentina) Carlos Pairetti	1968 Turismo Carretera
USAC Stock Car National Championship	(United States) A. J. Foyt	1968 USAC Stock Car National Championship

== Touring car ==
Series	Driver/Manufacturer	Season
European Touring Car Challenge	Div.3 (Austria) Dieter Quester	1968 European Touring Car Challenge
European Touring Car Challenge	Div.3 Manufacturers: (Germany) BMW	1968 European Touring Car Challenge
European Touring Car Challenge	Div.2 (United Kingdom) John Rhodes	1968 European Touring Car Challenge
European Touring Car Challenge	Div.2 Manufacturers: (United Kingdom) BMC	1968 European Touring Car Challenge
European Touring Car Challenge	Div.1 (United Kingdom) John Handley	1968 European Touring Car Challenge
European Touring Car Challenge	Div.1 Manufacturers: (United Kingdom) BMC	1968 European Touring Car Challenge
Australian Touring Car Championship	(Australia) Ian Geoghegan	1968 Australian Touring Car Championship
Trans-American Sedan Championship	Over 2.0L: (United States) Chevrolet	1968 Trans-Am season
Trans-American Sedan Championship	Under 2.0L: (Germany) Porsche	1968 Trans-Am season
British Saloon Car Championship	(Australia) Frank Gardner	1968 British Saloon Car Championship

== See also ==
- List of motorsport championships
- Auto racing
