= List of 1969 motorsport champions =

1969 motorsport champions
Previous: 1968	Next: 1970

This list of 1969 motorsport champions is a list of national or international auto racing series with a Championship decided by the points or positions earned by a driver from multiple races.

== Drag racing ==
Series	Champion	Refer
NHRA Drag Racing Series	Top Fuel: (United States) Steve Carbone	1969 NHRA Drag Racing Series

== Karting ==
Series	Driver	Season article
Karting World Championship	(Belgium) François Goldstein	
Karting World Championship	Junior: (Sweden) D. Carlsson	

== Motorcycle racing ==
Series	Rider	refer
500cc World Championship	(Italy) Giacomo Agostini	1969 Grand Prix motorcycle racing season
350cc World Championship	(Italy) Giacomo Agostini	1969 Grand Prix motorcycle racing season
250cc World Championship	(Australia) Kel Carruthers	1969 Grand Prix motorcycle racing season
125cc World Championship	(United Kingdom) Dave Simmonds	1969 Grand Prix motorcycle racing season
50cc World Championship	(Spain) Ángel Nieto	1969 Grand Prix motorcycle racing season
Speedway World Championship	(New Zealand) Ivan Mauger	1969 Individual Speedway World Championship

== Open wheel racing ==
Series	Driver	refer
Formula One World Championship	(United Kingdom) Jackie Stewart	1969 Formula One season
Formula One World Championship	Constructors: (France) Matra-Ford	1969 Formula One season
European Formula Two Championship	(France) Johnny Servoz-Gavin	1969 European Formula Two Championship
USAC National Championship	(United States) Mario Andretti	1969 USAC Championship Car season
SCCA Continental Championship	(United States) Tony Adamowicz	1969 SCCA Continental Championship
Tasman Series	(New Zealand) Chris Amon	1969 Tasman Series
Australian Drivers' Championship	(Australia) Kevin Bartlett	1969 Australian Drivers' Championship
Australian Formula 2 Championship	(Australia) Max Stewart	1969 Australian Formula 2 Championship
Guards Formula 5000 Championship	(United Kingdom) Peter Gethin	1969 Guards Formula 5000 Championship
Cup of Peace and Friendship	(Czechoslovakia) Vladimír Hubáček	1969 Cup of Peace and Friendship
Cup of Peace and Friendship	Nations: Czechoslovakia	1969 Cup of Peace and Friendship
South African Formula One Championship	(Rhodesia) John Love	1969 South African Formula One Championship
Formula Three
Lombank British Formula Three Championship	(Brazil) Emerson Fittipaldi	
East German Formula Three Championship	(East Germany) Frieder Rädlein	1969 East German Formula Three Championship
East German Formula Three Championship	LK II: (East Germany) Wolfgang Küther	1969 East German Formula Three Championship
French Formula Three Championship	(France) François Mazet	
French Formula Three Championship	Teams: (France) Volant Shell/Lotus Components	
Italian Formula Three Championship	(Italy) Gianluigi Picchi	
Italian Formula Three Championship	Teams: (Italy) Tecno Racing Team	
Soviet Formula 3 Championship	(Estonian Soviet Socialist Republic) Enn Griffel	1969 Soviet Formula 3 Championship
Formula Ford
Scottish Formula Ford Championship	(United Kingdom) Tom Walkinshaw	
Swedish Formula Ford Championship	(Sweden) Ronnie Peterson	

== Rallying ==
Series	Driver	refer
Australian Rally Championship	(Australia) Frank Kilfoyle	1969 Australian Rally Championship
Australian Rally Championship	Co-Drivers: (Australia) Doug Rutherford	1969 Australian Rally Championship
British Rally Championship	(United Kingdom) John Bloxham	1969 British Rally Championship
British Rally Championship	Co-Drivers: (United Kingdom) Richard Harper	1969 British Rally Championship
Canadian Rally Championship	(Canada) Bruce Schmidt	1969 Canadian Rally Championship
Canadian Rally Championship	Co-Drivers: (Canada) Betty Schmidt; Co-Drivers: (Canada) Paul S. Manson	1969 Canadian Rally Championship
Estonian Rally Championship	(Estonian Soviet Socialist Republic) Valdo Mägi	1969 Estonian Rally Championship
Estonian Rally Championship	Co-Drivers: (Estonian Soviet Socialist Republic) Ülo Eismann	1969 Estonian Rally Championship
European Rally Championship	(Sweden) Harry Källström	1969 European Rally Championship
European Rally Championship	Co-Drivers: (Sweden) Gunnar Häggbom	1969 European Rally Championship
Finnish Rally Championship	(Finland) Jorma Lusenius	
French Rally Championship	(France) Jean Vinatier	
Italian Rally Championship	(Italy) Sandro Munari	
Italian Rally Championship	Co-Drivers: (Italy) Arnaldo Bernacchini	
Italian Rally Championship	Manufacturers: (Italy) Lancia	
Polish Rally Championship	(Poland) Ryszard Nowicki	
Romanian Rally Championship	(Romania) Aurel Puiu	
Scottish Rally Championship	(United Kingdom) Donald Heggie	
Scottish Rally Championship	Co-Drivers: (United Kingdom) George Deans	
South African National Rally Championship	(South Africa) Jan Hettema	
South African National Rally Championship	Co-Drivers: (South Africa) Franz Boshoff	
South African National Rally Championship	Manufacturers: (Sweden) Volvo	
Spanish Rally Championship	(Spain) José María Palomo	
Spanish Rally Championship	Co-Drivers: (Spain) Jorge Adell	

== Sports car and GT ==
Series	Manufacturer	refer
International Championship for Makes	(West Germany) Porsche	1969 World Sportscar Championship
International Grand Touring Trophy	(West Germany) Porsche	1969 World Sportscar Championship
Canadian American Challenge Cup	(New Zealand) Bruce McLaren	1969 Can-Am season
Australian Sports Car Championship	(Australia) Frank Matich	1969 Australian Sports Car Championship

== Stock car racing ==
Series	Driver	Season article
NASCAR Grand National Series	(United States) David Pearson	1969 NASCAR Grand National Series
NASCAR Grand National Series	Manufacturers: (United States) Ford	1969 NASCAR Grand National Series
NASCAR Pacific Coast Late Model Series	(United States) Ray Elder	1969 NASCAR Pacific Coast Late Model Series
ARCA Racing Series	(United States) Benny Parsons	1969 ARCA Racing Series
Turismo Carretera	(Argentina) Gastón Perkins	1969 Turismo Carretera
USAC Stock Car National Championship	(United States) Roger McCluskey	1969 USAC Stock Car National Championship

== Touring car ==
Series	Driver/Manufacturer	refer
European Touring Car Challenge	Div.3: (Austria) Dieter Quester	1969 European Touring Car Challenge
European Touring Car Challenge	Div.3 Manufacturers: (Germany) BMW	1969 European Touring Car Challenge
European Touring Car Challenge	Div.2: (Italy) Spartaco Dini	1969 European Touring Car Challenge
European Touring Car Challenge	Div.2 Manufacturers: (Italy) Alfa Romeo	1969 European Touring Car Challenge
European Touring Car Challenge	Div.1: (Italy) Marsilio Pasotti	1969 European Touring Car Challenge
European Touring Car Challenge	Div.1 Manufacturers: (Italy) Abarth	1969 European Touring Car Challenge
Australian Touring Car Championship	(Australia) Ian Geoghegan	1969 Australian Touring Car Championship
Trans-American Sedan Championship	Over 2.0L: (United States) Chevrolet	1969 Trans-Am season
Trans-American Sedan Championship	Under 2.0L: (Germany) Porsche	1969 Trans-Am season
British Saloon Car Championship	(Republic of Ireland) Alec Poole	1969 British Saloon Car Championship

== See also ==
- List of motorsport championships
- Auto racing
