= Pauli Toivonen =

Finnish rally driver (1929–2005)

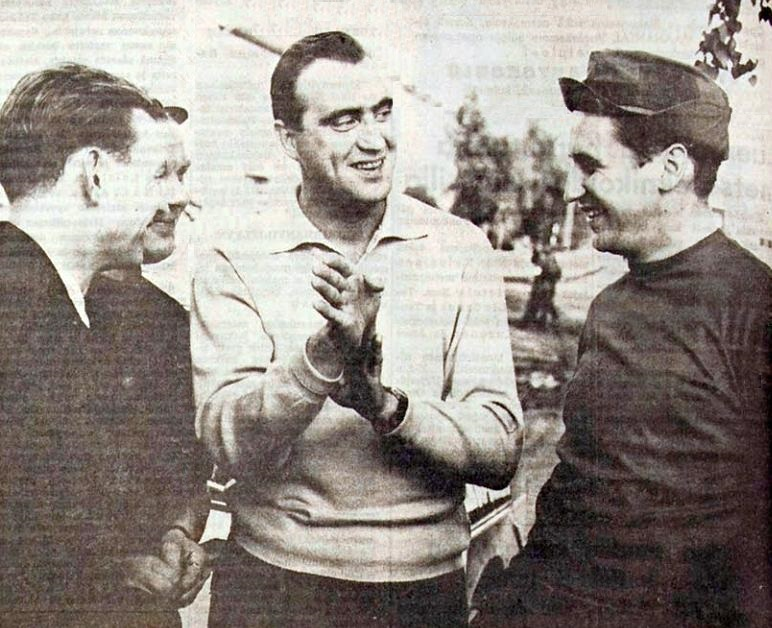
Toivonen (in the middle) with Rauno Aaltonen and Timo Mäkinen

Pauli Johannes Toivonen (22 August 1929 – 14 February 2005) was a Finnish rally car driver. He drove for Citroën, Lancia and Porsche and had many successes to his credit. Toivonen had two sons, Harri and Henri, both also rally drivers.

Toivonen was awarded a controversial first place on the 1966 Monte Carlo Rally - the top three placing Minis of Timo Mäkinen, Rauno Aaltonen and Paddy Hopkirk and Roger Clark's 4th place Ford Cortina were disqualified. Rally officials determined the headlamp bulbs were not homologated, following a last minute rule change. The winner therefore became Toivonen's Citroën DS.

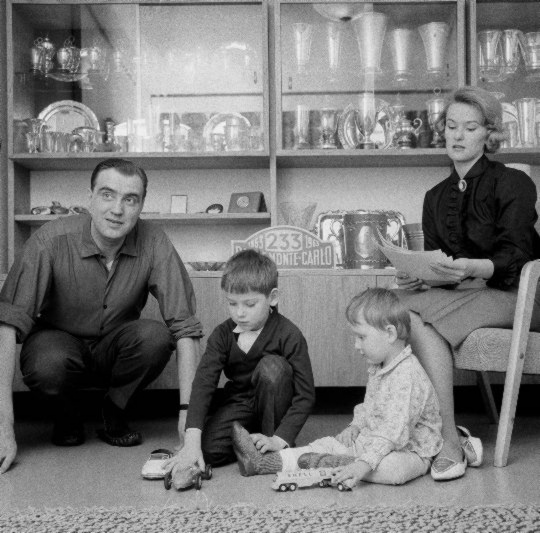
Toivonen with his family in 1963

As a result, Toivonen did not brag about his victory in the prestigious Monte Carlo rally because he felt he had not deserved the victory. However, when his son, Henri came in first at the same event twenty years later — this time in a convincing manner — Toivonen said, "Now the name of Toivonen has been cleared." Toivonen was European Rally champion in 1968 and won four other events for Porsche in the same year.

While Toivonen was mainly known for driving rally cars, he also drove for Porsche in World Sportscar Championship races and for Renault in the 24 Hours of Le Mans.

== Notable results ==
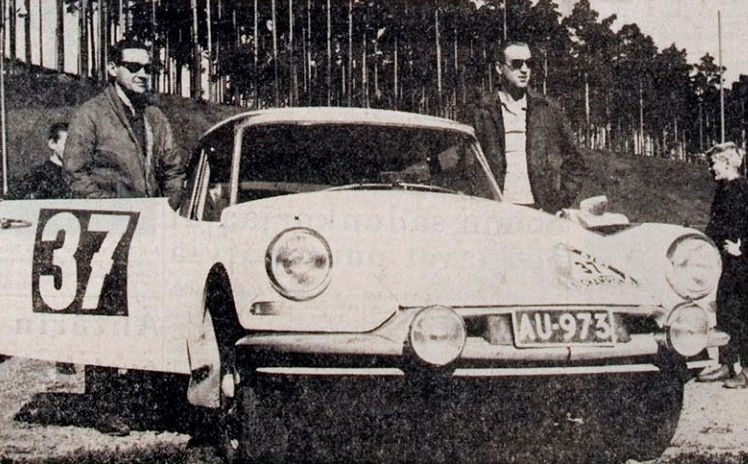
Toivonen after winning the 1962 1000 Lakes Rally

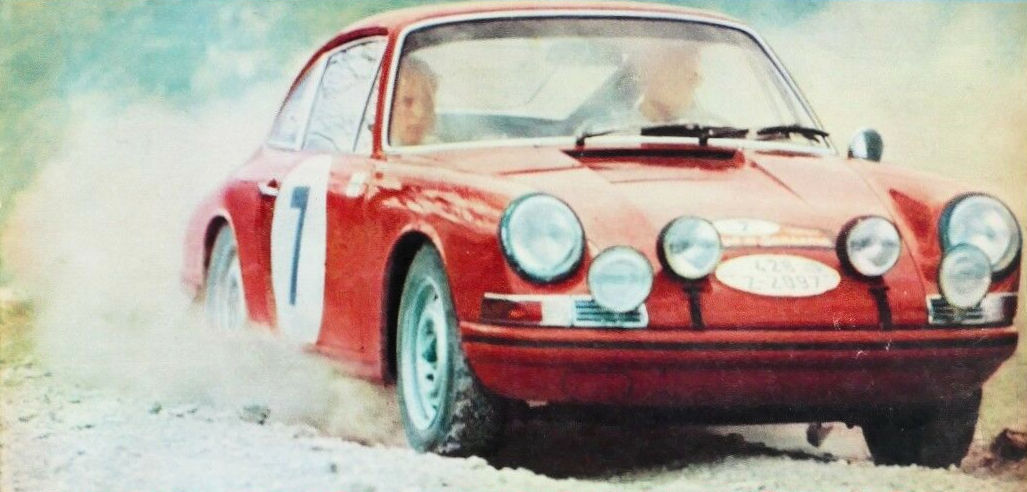
Toivonen and co-driver Martti Tiukkanen in the Porsche 911T with which they won the 1968 Rallye Sanremo

Year	Rally	Finish	Car	Co-driver
1961	1000 Lakes Rally	2nd	Citroën DS	Jaakko Kallio
1962	1000 Lakes Rally	1st	Citroën DS19	Jaakko Kallio
1963	Monte Carlo Rally	2nd	Citroën DS19	A. Jarvi
1965	1000 Lakes Rally	3rd	Volkswagen 1500S	Kalevi Leivo
1966	Monte Carlo Rally	1st	Citroën DS21	E. Mikander
1967	Swedish Rally	6th	Lancia	Ahava
1967	Tour de Corse	2nd	Lancia	M. Tiukkanen
1967	1000 Lakes Rally	7th	Lancia	Salonen
1968	Monte Carlo Rally	2nd	Porsche 911T	M. Tiukkanen
1968	Acropolis Rally	3rd	Porsche 911T	M. Kolari
1968	West German Rally	1st	Porsche 911T	M. Kolari
1968	East German Rally	1st	Porsche 911T	M. Kolari
1968	San Remo Rally	1st	Porsche 911T	M. Tiukkanen
1968	Castrol-Danube Rally	1st	Porsche 911T	M. Tiukkanen
1968	Geneva Rally	1st	Porsche 911T	Vihervaara
1968	European Champion			
1969	Acropolis	1st	Porsche 911S	M. Kolari

== 24 Hours of Le Mans results ==
Year	Team	Co-drivers	Car	Class	Laps	Pos.	Class pos.
1966	(France) Société Automobiles Alpine	(Sweden) Berndt Jansson	Alpine A210	P 1.3	217	DNF	DNF

Sporting positions
Preceded by G1: Sobiesław Zasada; G2: Bengt Söderström; G3: Vic Elford	European Rally Champion; 1968	Succeeded by Harry Källström
