= Vic Elford =

British racing driver (1935–2022)

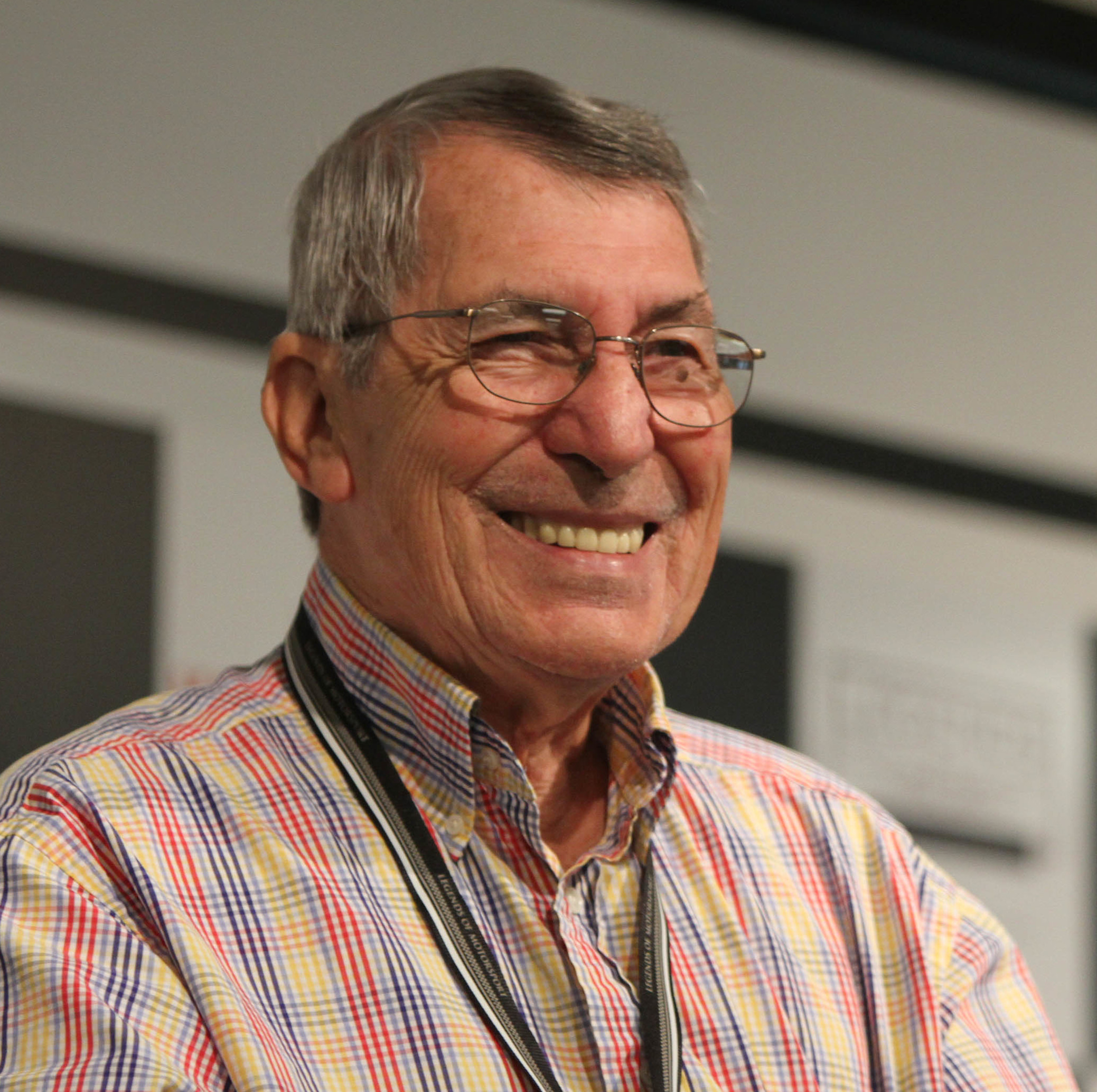
- Elford in 2010 at Watkins Glen
- Born: Victor Henry Elford; 10 June 1935; Peckham, London, England
- Died: 13 March 2022 (aged 86); Plantation, Florida, US

Formula One World Championship career
- Nationality: (United Kingdom) British
- Active years: 1968–1969, 1971
- Team(s): Cooper, McLaren, BRM
- Entries: 13
- Championships: 0
- Wins: 0
- Podiums: 0
- Career points: 8
- Pole positions: 0
- Fastest laps: 0
- First entry: 1968 French Grand Prix
- Last entry: 1971 German Grand Prix

24 Hours of Le Mans career
- Years: 1967–1974, 1983
- Teams: Porsche System; Porsche Salzburg; Martini Racing; Autodelta SpA; Automobiles Charles Pozzi; Robert Buchet; Rondeau
- Best finish: 6th (1973)
- Class wins: 2 (1967, 1973)

Victor Henry Elford (10 June 1935 – 13 March 2022) was an English sports car racing, rallying, and Formula One driver. He participated in 13 World Championship F1 Grands Prix, debuting on 7 July 1968. He scored a total of 8 championship points.

Nicknamed "Quick Vic" by his peers, Elford was mainly a famous sports car competitor as well as a successful rally driver, associated often with Porsche.

== Career ==
Elford started as a co-driver, partnering David Seigle-Morris in a Triumph TR3A. By 1961, he had acquired the confidence to see himself as a potential driver in his own right: the confidence was not shared by team manager Marcus Chambers, and Elford purchased a race-tuned Mini which he rallied as a privateer with limited success before selling it at the end of the season. 1962 found him achieving success in several UK rallies driving a factory sponsored DKW Junior. The next year saw a return to Triumph, with Elford achieving fast times with the Triumph TR4s, although reliability of the cars in Elford's hands was disappointing, so Elford switched to Ford the following year: this was the beginning of a successful three-year rallying stint with the Ford Cortinas.

In 1967, Elford was European rally champion in a works Porsche 911S. Among other victories, he won the 1968 Rally Monte Carlo in a Porsche 911S and, only a week later, the 24 Hours of Daytona in a Porsche 907, Porsche's first ever overall win in a 24-hour race.

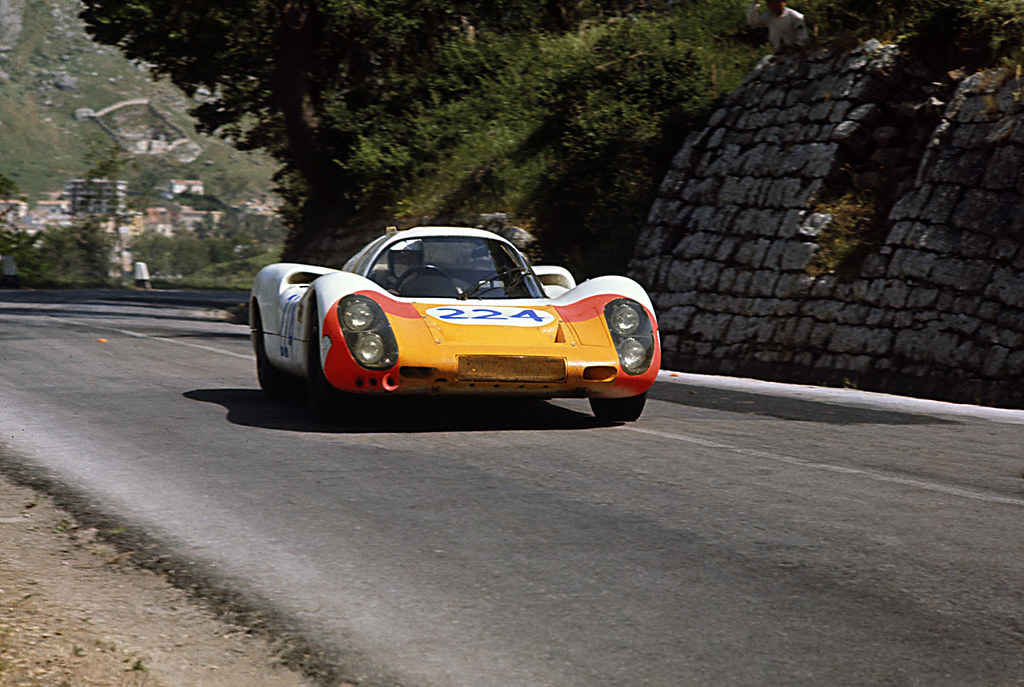
Winning the 1968 Targa Florio in this Porsche 907 with Umberto Maglioli.

Later that year, Elford also won the Targa Florio teamed with veteran Umberto Maglioli in a famous come-from-behind race after he lost 18 minutes in the first lap due to a tyre failure. Elford then entered the French Grand Prix and finished fourth in his first F1 race – a wet one, too.

By finishing the 1969 Monaco Grand Prix despite troubles, Elford became the first driver to do well in both famous events in Monte Carlo since Louis Chiron.

Racing in the World Sportscar Championship for Martini Racing against the JWA Gulf team, Elford was clocked at over 380 km/h in the Porsche 917LH in practice for the 1971 24 Hours of Le Mans. He went on to win the 1971 12 Hours of Sebring in a Porsche 917K, as well as several 1000km Nürburgring races.

During the 1972 24 Hours of Le Mans, when he saw a burning Ferrari Daytona in front of him, Elford stopped mid-race to save the driver. When opening the door, Elford found an empty cockpit, as the driver had already escaped. Elford then noticed the wreck of a Lola among the trees, with Jo Bonnier having been killed. Cameras caught the act and Elford was named Chevalier of the National Order of Merit by French President Georges Pompidou.

A Targa Florio, Sebring, and Daytona winner, Elford's favourite track was nonetheless the Nürburgring despite the disappointing results in his three F1 attempts there, of which the first two ended in lap 1 accidents. His last two GPs were at the Nürburgring. In addition to the 1000 km, Elford won some 500 km races there, winning a total of six major races. Only Rudolf Caracciola and Stirling Moss beat that record.

Elford's lap records included: Targa Florio, Nürburgring, Daytona, Sebring, Norisring, Monza, Buenos Aires, Road Atlanta, Laguna Seca, Riverside and Le Mans.

On 4 February 1967 at Lydden Circuit, Elford won the first ever Rallycross event. Later that year he won the 84 Hour "Marathon de la Route" event at the Nürburgring, on the full 28 km long combined version, which was rarely used after the 1930s. Fellow pilots Hans Herrmann and Jochen Neerpasch preferred the rally driver to steer the Porsche 911 through the 7 hours long, four consecutive night turns in rainy and foggy conditions. The winning car was fitted with a semi-automatic Sportomatic transmission, as was another Porsche 911S entered by the factory team.

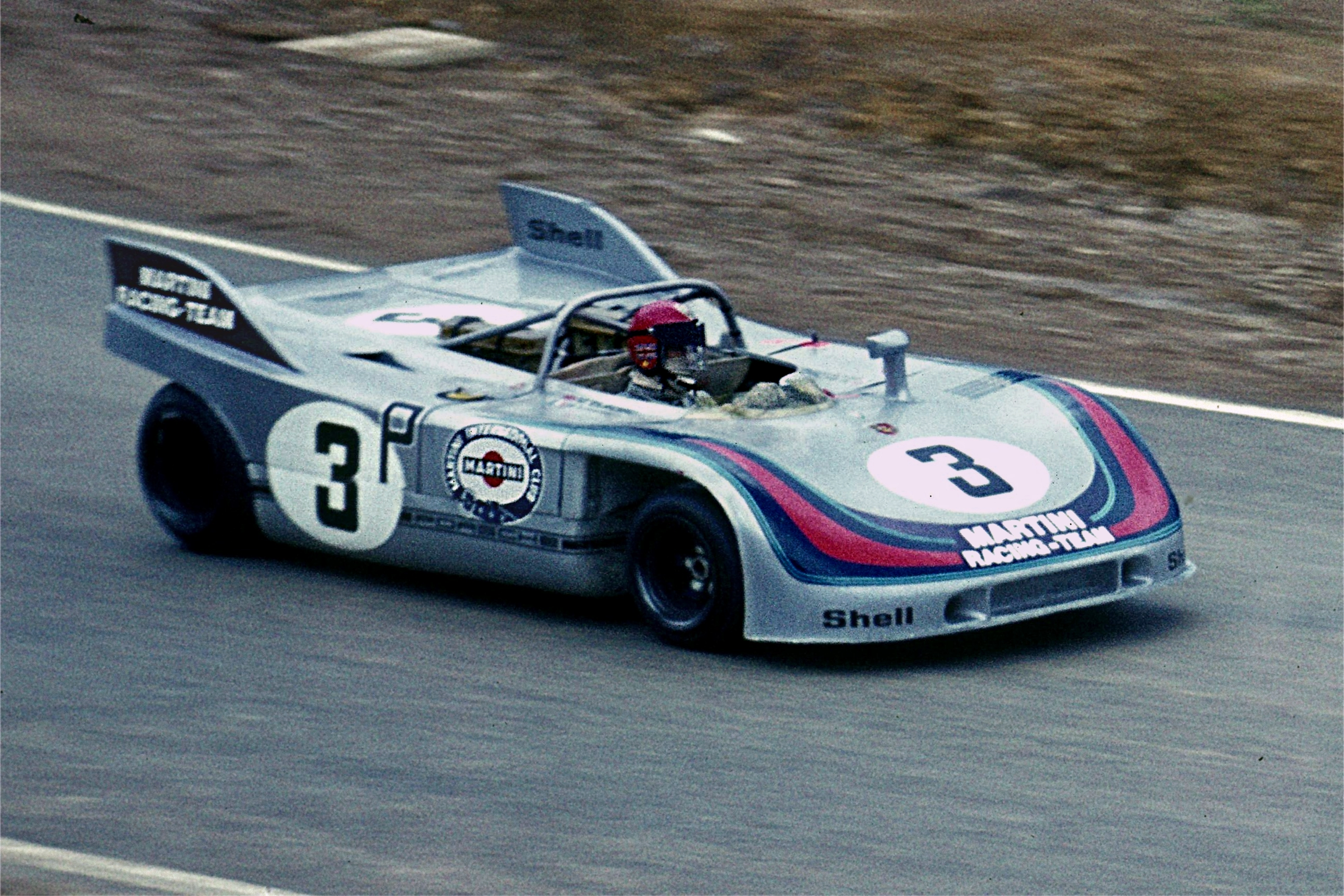
Elford in a Porsche 908/3, in practice for the 1971 1000km Nürburgring

Although he raced five years for Porsche, Elford also raced for Ford, Triumph, Lancia, Alfa-Romeo, Ferrari, Chaparral, Shadow, Cooper, Lola, Chevron, and Subaru. He also drove for McLaren in F1 & CanAm Chevrolet in TransAm.

Overseas, Elford was also racing in CanAm and the Daytona 500 of NASCAR.

On 25 January 2015, Elford received the 2015 Phil Hill Award from Road Racing Drivers Club. It was presented to him by club president Bobby Rahal.

== Personal life ==
After retiring, Elford lived in South Florida in the United States. Elford died on 13 March 2022, at the age of 86. At the time of his death, he had been suffering from cancer for roughly a year.

== Racing record ==
=== Complete British Saloon Car Championship results ===
(key) (Races in bold indicate pole position; races in italics indicate fastest lap.)

Year	Team	Car	Class	1	2	3	4	5	6	7	8	9	10	11	Pos.	Pts	Class
1961	Don Moore	Morris Mini Minor	A	SNE	GOO	AIN	SIL	CRY	SIL	BRH	OUL ovr:? cls:2	SNE			21st	6	8th
1967	AFN	Porsche 911	C	BRH ovr:3 cls:2	SNE; Ret	SIL; Ret	SIL ovr:2 cls:1	MAL	SIL ovr:5 cls:2	SIL ovr:5 cls:2	BRH ovr:3 cls:2	OUL ovr:5† cls:1†	BRH; Ret		7th	40	1st
1968	Bill Bradley	Porsche 911 L	C	BRH ovr:2 cls:1	THR ovr:17 cls:4	SIL ovr:3 cls:1	CRY	MAL	BRH	SIL	CRO	OUL	BRH	BRH	14th	18	4th

† Events with 2 races staged for the different classes.

=== Complete Formula One World Championship results ===
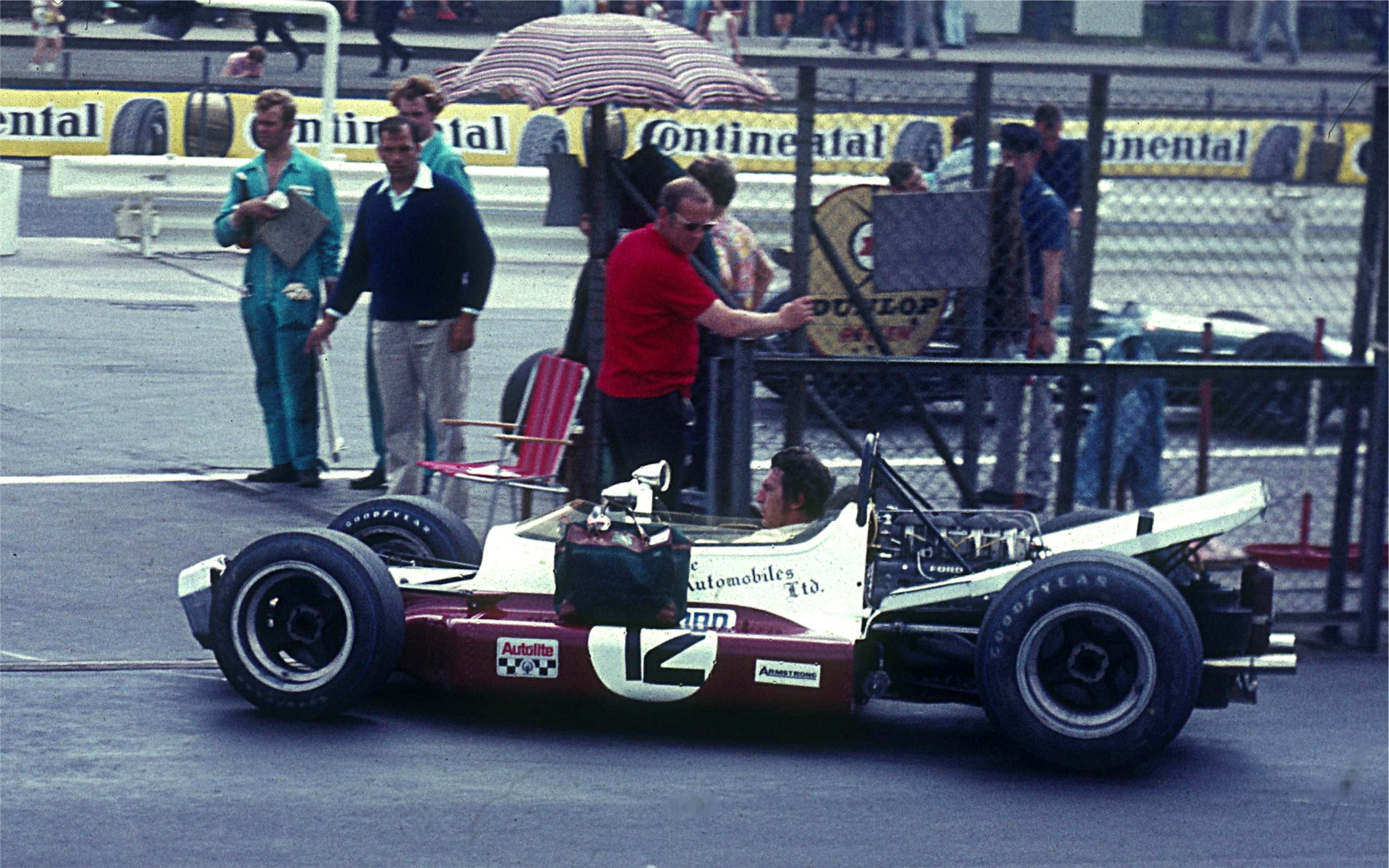
Vic Elford in the cockpit of an incomplete McLaren M7B, prior to the 1969 German Grand Prix at the Nürburgring

(key)

Year	Entrant	Chassis	Engine	1	2	3	4	5	6	7	8	9	10	11	12	WDC	Pts.
1968	Cooper Car Company	Cooper T86B	BRM P101 3.0 V12	RSA	ESP	MON	BEL	NED	FRA; 4	GBR; Ret	GER; Ret	ITA; Ret	CAN; 5	USA; Ret	MEX; 8	18th	5
1969	Antique Automobiles Racing Team	Cooper T86	Maserati 10/F1 3.0 V12	RSA	ESP	MON; 7										14th	3
1969	Antique Automobiles Racing Team	McLaren M7B	Ford Cosworth DFV 3.0 V8				NED; 10	FRA; 5	GBR; 6	GER; Ret	ITA	CAN	USA	MEX		14th	3
1971	Yardley Team BRM	BRM P160	BRM P142 3.0 V12	RSA	ESP	MON	NED	FRA	GBR	GER; 11	AUT	ITA	CAN	USA		NC	0

=== Complete 24 Hours of Le Mans results ===
Year	Team	Co-Drivers	Car	Class	Laps	Pos.	Class Pos.
1967	(Germany) Porsche System Engineering	(Netherlands) Ben Pon	Porsche 906K Carrera 6	S 2.0	327	7th	**1st**
1968	(Germany) Porsche System Engineering	(Germany) Gerhard Mitter	Porsche 908	S 3.0	111	DNF	DNF
1969	(Germany) Porsche System Engineering	(United Kingdom) Richard Attwood	Porsche 917L	S 5.0	327	DNF	DNF
1970	(Austria) Porsche KG Salzburg	(Germany) Kurt Ahrens Jr.	Porsche 917L	S 5.0	225	DNF	DNF
1971	(Germany) Martini Racing Team	(France) Gérard Larrousse	Porsche 917LH	S 5.0	74	DNF	DNF
1972	(Italy) Autodelta SpA	(Austria) Helmut Marko	Alfa Romeo Tipo 33TT3	S 3.0	232	DNF	DNF
1973	(France) Automobiles Charles Pozzi	(France) Claude Ballot-Léna	Ferrari 365 GTB/4	GT; 5.0	316	6th	**1st**
1974	(France) Robert Buchet	(France) Claude Ballot-Léna	Porsche 911 Carrera RSR	GT	117	DNF	DNF
1983	(France) Automobiles Jean Rondeau	(France) Joël Gouhier (France) Anny-Charlotte Verney	Rondeau M379C	Gr. C	136	DNF	DNF

=== Complete IMC results ===
Year	Entrant	Car	1	2	3	4	5	6	7
1970	Toyota Motors	Toyota Corona GSS	MON; Ret	SWE	ITA	KEN	AUT	GRE	GBR

=== Complete WRC results ===
Year	Entrant	Car	1	2	3	4	5	6	7	8	9	10	11	12	WDC	Pts
1982	Subaru Motors of Japan	Subaru Leone 4WD	MON	SWE	POR	KEN; Ret	FRA	GRC	NZL	BRA	FIN	ITA	CIV	GBR	NC	0
1983	Noriyuki Koseki	Subaru Leone 1800	MON	SWE	POR	KEN; Ret	FRA	GRC	NZL	ARG	FIN	ITA	CIV	GBR	NC	0

== Bibliography ==
Elford has authored a number of books on the subject of motorsport:

- Porsche High Performance Driving Handbook ISBN 0-87938-849-8 (1994)
- Vic Elford: Reflections on a Golden Era in Motorsports ISBN 1-893618-52-8 (2005)

Sporting positions
Preceded by G1: Lillebror Nasenius; G2: Sobiesław Zasada; G3: Günter Klass	European Rally Champion G3 Class; 1967	Succeeded by Pauli Toivonen
