= Lola T190 =

Race car

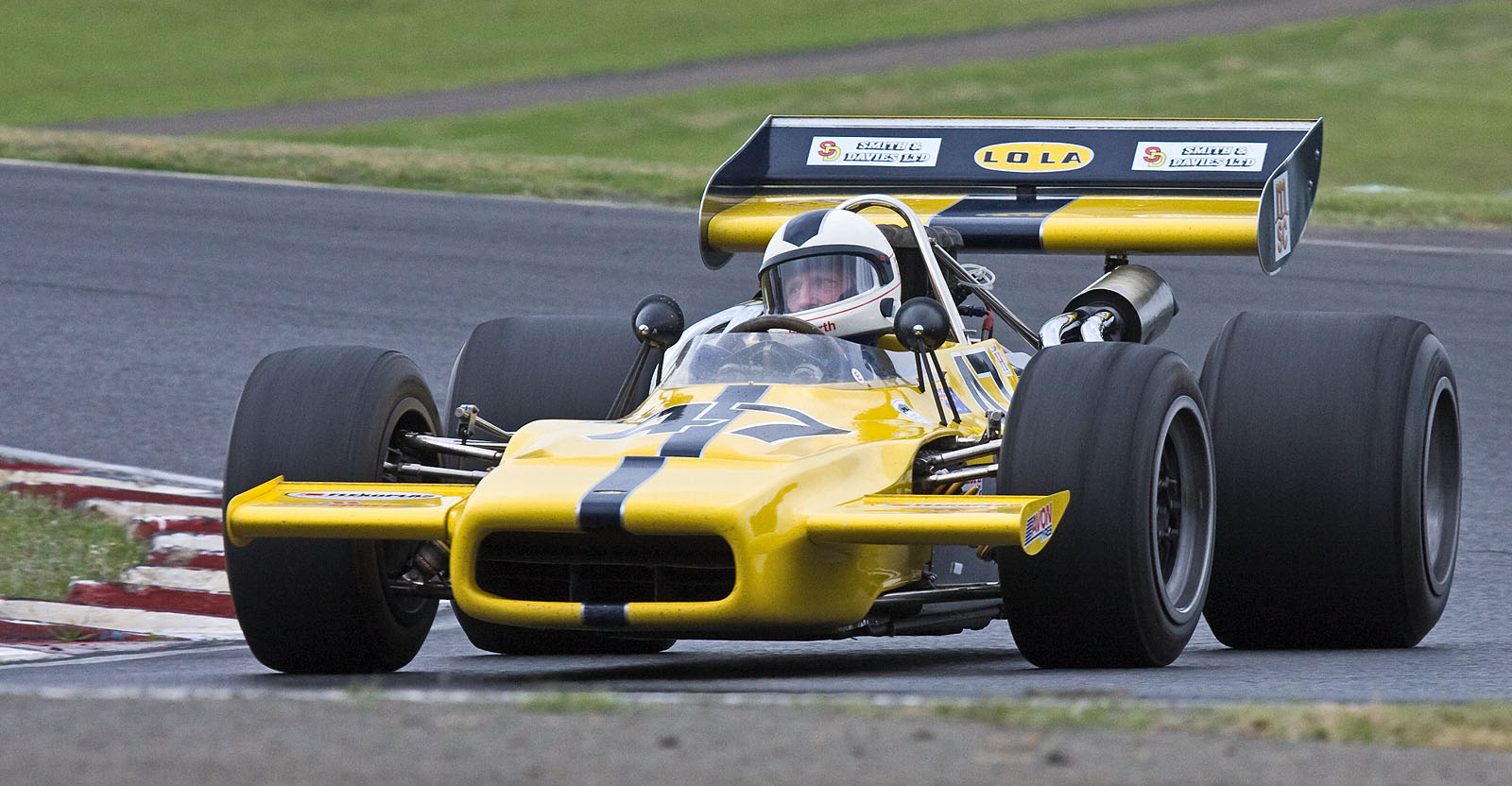
- Category: Formula 5000
- Constructor: Lola Cars
- Designer(s): Eric Broadley

Technical specifications
- Chassis: Fiberglass-reinforced polyester, fiberglass body
- Suspension (front): Independent, double wishbones and inclined coil spring/shock absorber units
- Suspension (rear): Independent, reversed lower wishbone, single top link, twin tower links and coil spring/shock absorber units
- Length: 150 in (3,800 mm)
- Width: 77 in (2,000 mm)
- Height: 35 in (890 mm) (to roll bar); 26 in (660 mm) (to windshield)
- Axle track: Front: 58 in (1,500 mm)
- Wheelbase: 92 in (2,300 mm)
- Engine: Mid-engine, longitudinally mounted, 4,940 cc (301.5 cu in), Chevrolet, 90°, 16-valve, OHV, V8, NA
- Transmission: Hewland DG300 5-speed manual
- Power: 450–500 hp (336–373 kW); 450 lb⋅ft (610 N⋅m)
- Weight: 1,290 lb (590 kg)
- Tyres: Avon

Competition history
- Debut: 1969

The Lola T190 was an open-wheel formula race car, designed, developed and built by Lola Cars, for Formula 5000 racing, in 1969. A total of 17 models were produced.
