= Lotus 70 =

The Lotus 70 was a race car designed by Lotus for the Formula 5000 races. Originally designated the Lotus 68, the car was designed by Martin Waide and introduced at the end of the 1969 racing season.
