= Sobiesław Zasada =

Polish rally driver and economist (born 1930)

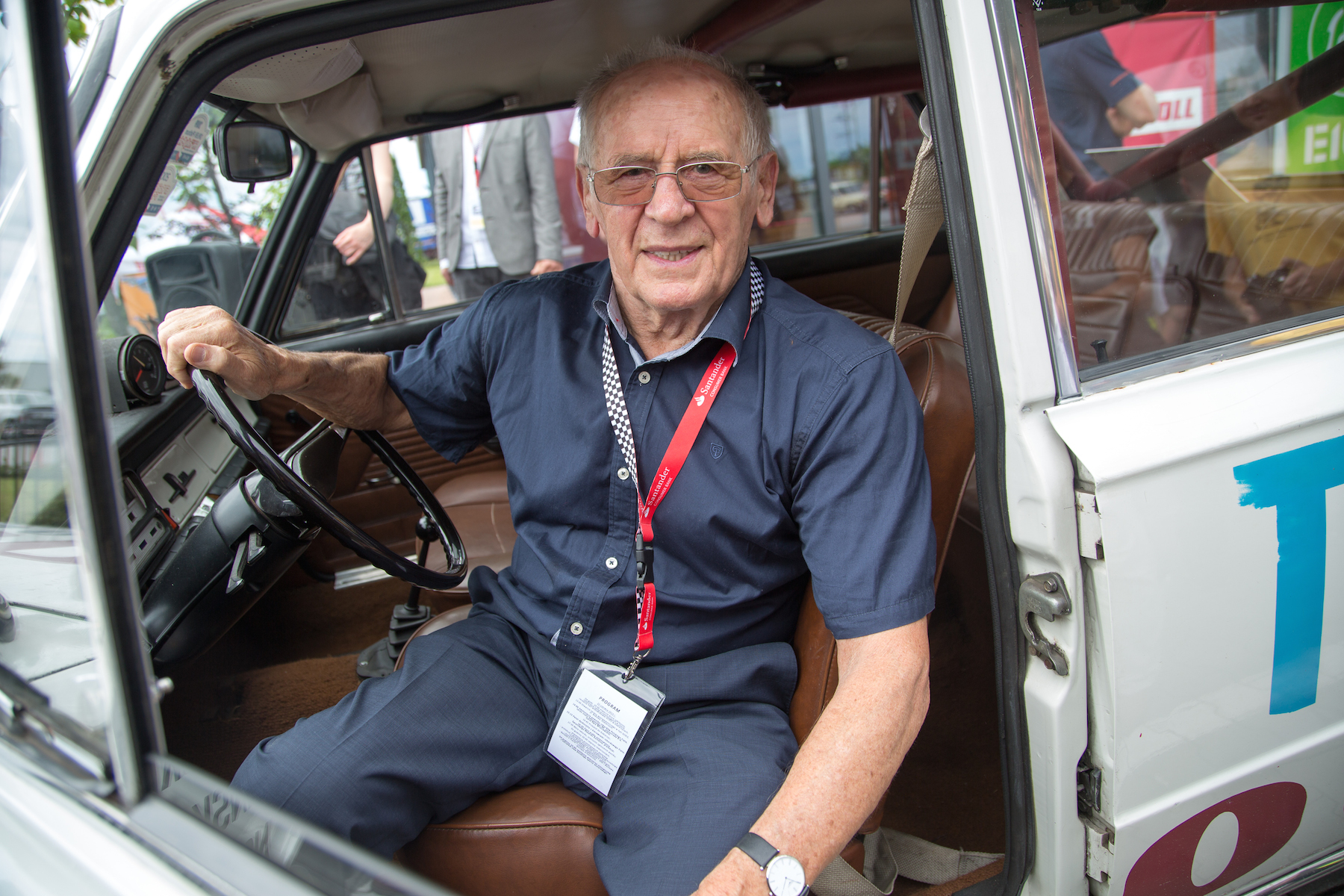
- Sobiesław Zasada in 2013

Personal information
- Nationality: (Poland) Polish
- Full name: Sobiesław Jan Zasada
- Born: January 27, 1930 (age 96); Dąbrowa Górnicza, Poland

World Rally Championship record
- Years active: 1973–1974, 1978–1979, 2021
- Rallies: 7
- Championships: 0
- Rally wins: 0
- Podiums: 0
- Stage wins: 0
- First rally: 1973 Safari Rally
- Last rally: 2021 Safari Rally

Sobiesław Jan Zasada (born 27 January 1930) is a Polish rally driver and economist. He won the European Rally Championship in 1966, 1967, 1971 and was vice-champion in 1968, 1969, and 1972. In 1967, he was chosen the Polish Sportspersonality of the Year.

== Career ==
Sobieslaw Zasada first raced motorcycles, and in 1951 entered four-wheel racing. After solid racing performances, he received support from the Polish automobile club in Warsaw. Zasada won the European Rally Champion title in 1966 with Steyr-Puch 650 (the smallest vehicle to achieve such victory) and in 1967 with 4-cylinder Porsche 912. In autumn of 1967 he was victorious driving his flat-six Porsche 911 in the Gran Premio Internacional de Turismo, a 2055-mile stage race across Argentina. In next two seasons Zasada with his Porsche 911 was runner-up in European Rally Championship, conquered only by Pauli Toivonen in 1968 and Harry Källström in 1969. Later on Zasada drove a BMW 2002 TI, regaining his European Champion title in 1971 and being surpassed only by Raffaele Pinto in 1972.

At the time of his successes racing his Porsche 912 in 1967, Zasada owned a four-person auto repair shop in Kraków. By the late 1990s, Zasada was one of the most successful businessmen in Poland. In 1996 Reuters reported that his Polish automotive group Sobieslaw Zasada Centrum SA launched the construction of Mercedes' Vito mini-vans. The launch marked the first production licensee that Mercedes-Benz had granted in eastern Europe. By that time Zasada controlled two utility car factories and several automotive parts plants.

Zasada announced that he would make a comeback in the 2021 Safari Rally, making him the oldest driver to compete in the World Rally Championship at 91. He took part in the race, but failed to finish it due to a series of collisions. It still made him the oldest driver ever to take part in a WRC rally.

== Honours ==
For his sport achievements and for his contribution to the development of Polish sport, he received the Order of Polonia Restituta:

- Knight's Cross (5th Class);
- Officer's Cross (4th Class);
- Commander's Cross with Star (2nd Class) in 2000.

Sporting positions
Preceded by Rauno Aaltonen	European Rally Champion G2 Class; 1966	Succeeded by G1: Sobiesław Zasada; G2: Bengt Söderström; G3: Vic Elford
Preceded by G1: Lillebror Nasenius; G2: Sobiesław Zasada; G3: Günter Klass	European Rally Champion G1 Class; 1967	Succeeded by Pauli Toivonen
Preceded by Jean-Claude Andruet	European Rally Champion; 1971	Succeeded by Raffaele Pinto
