= Jean-Louis Lafosse =

French racing driver (1941–1981)

Jean-Louis Gabriel Lafosse (15 March 1941 – 13 June 1981) was a French racing driver. He was most closely associated with the 24 Hours of Le Mans race, in which he finished second in 1975 and 1976.

In the European Touring Car Championship, Lafosse won the 1974 500 km of Vallelunga, and the four-hour race at Monza the same year. He was runner-up in the Tourist Trophy in 1976.

Lafosse had been provisionally entered in the 1974 Italian Grand Prix, scheduled to drive a Brabham for Scuderia Finotto alongside Carlo Facetti, but his entry was refused by the organisers.

Lafosse was killed during the 1981 24 Hours of Le Mans, when his Rondeau M379C suffered a mechanical failure on the Mulsanne Straight, veered to the right, and struck the guard rail next to a marshals' post at unabated speed, before crossing the track and striking the opposite guard rail. Two marshals were injured, but Lafosse died instantly. Lafosse' body was partially ejected and can be seen being dragged across the track with only his legs and lower body remaining in the cockpit. Photographs immediately prior to the accident showed damage to the front of Lafosse's car, with grass in the front air intake, suggesting that he had run off the track moments previously, possibly causing the damage that contributed to the fatal accident.

== Racing record ==
=== Complete 24 Hours of Le Mans results ===
Year	Team	Co-Drivers	Car	Class	Laps	Pos.	Class Pos.
1972	(Switzerland) Scuderia Filipinetti	(United Kingdom) Mike Parkes (Switzerland) Jean-Jacques Cochet	Ferrari 365 GTB/4	GTS; 5.0	302	7th	3rd
1973	Équipe Gitanes Cigarettes de France	(Sweden) Reine Wisell (Belgium) Hughes de Fierlandt	Lola T282-Cosworth	S 3.0	164	DNF	DNF
1974	(United States) North American Racing Team	(Italy) Giancarlo Gagliardi	Dino 308 GT4 LM	S 3.0	30	DNF	DNF
1975	(France) Automobiles Ligier Gitanes	(France) Guy Chasseuil	Ligier JS2-Cosworth	S 3.0	336	2nd	2nd
1976	(United States) Grand Touring Cars Inc.	(France) François Migault	Mirage M8-Cosworth	Gp.6; 3.0	338	2nd	2nd
1977	(France) WM A.E.R.E.M.	(France) Xavier Mathiot (France) Marc Sourd	WM P77-Peugeot	GTP	90	DNF	DNF
1978	(France) Pozzi-Thompson JMS Racing	(France) Claude Ballot-Léna	Ferrari 512BB	IMSA +2.5	218	DNF	DNF
1979	(West Germany) Gelo Sportswear International	(United Kingdom) John Fitzpatrick (West Germany) Harald Grohs	Porsche 935	Gr.5 +2.5	196	DNF	DNF
1980	(West Germany) Porsche Kremer Racing	(United States) Ted Field (United States) Danny Ongais	Porsche 935 K3	Gr.5	89	DNF	DNF
1981	(France) Calberson Jean Rondeau	(France) Jean Ragnotti	Rondeau M379-Cosworth	S +2.0	28	DNF	DNF

=== Complete Formula One World Championship results ===
(key)

Year	Entrant	Chassis	Engine	1	2	3	4	5	6	7	8	9	10	11	12	13	14	15	WDC	Pts.
1974	Scuderia Finotto	Brabham BT42	Ford Cosworth DFV 3.0 V8	ARG	BRA	RSA	ESP	BEL	MON	SWE	NED	FRA	GBR	GER	AUT	ITA; DNA	CAN	USA	NC	0
