= Carlo Facetti =

Italian racing driver (born 1935)

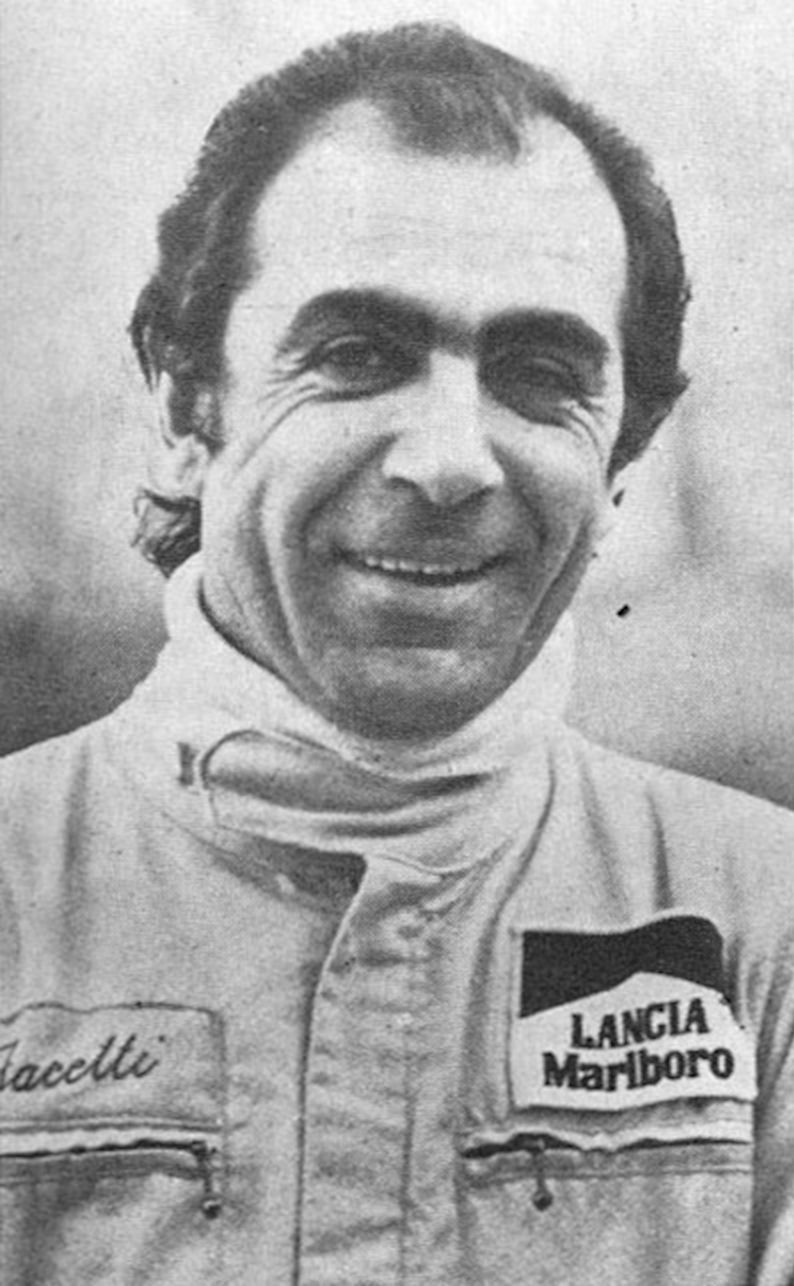
- Facetti in 1975 with Lancia-Marlboro racing team
- Born: 26 June 1935 (age 91); Cormano, Lombardy, Italy

Formula One World Championship career
- Nationality: (Italy) Italian
- Active years: 1974
- Team: Scuderia Finotto
- Entries: 1 (0 starts)
- Championships: 0
- Wins: 0
- Podiums: 0
- Career points: 0
- Pole positions: 0
- Fastest laps: 0
- First entry: 1974 Italian Grand Prix

Carlo Giovanni Facetti (born 26 June 1935) is a former racing driver from Italy, mainly known for his success in touring car and sports car racing. In his single attempt at Formula One he failed to qualify for the 1974 Italian Grand Prix with a Brabham BT42 run by the Scuderia Finotto team.

In 1979, Facetti was the European Touring Car Champion. He was also second in 1977 and fourth in 1978.

== Racing career ==
Facetti was born in Cormano, Lombardy. For nearly 40 years, he would work in his workshop and on Sunday put his race overalls and helmet and going racing. He explained his success: "We work from seven in the morning until eight at night with the sole desire to makes engines unrivaled". He learned to drive at the age of 11, with Alberto Ascari, a friend of his father, Piero Facetti, who in turn was a mechanic and a racer, who finished fourth in the 1947 Mille Miglia. His brothers, Giuliano and Rosadelle would also become racing drivers.

=== The early years ===
Facetti started racing in 1953, paired with Elio Zagato at the Giro di Calabria, using a Fiat 8V 1100, although it was Zagato bodied with Facetti prepared engines. By 1960, he was building and racing Formula Junior cars with Lancia Appia engines. "It took a lot of passion, a racing seat and reverse shift from a Fiat 600!". Despite everything, he was very fast though he had a great company: Facetti remembers at Monza he was "able to score some good times compared to those of experienced pilots such as Ludovico Scarfiotti, Lorenzo Bandini and Giancarlo Baghetti".

For 1963, Facetti moved to touring cars to race in the inaugural European Touring Car Challenge, with Lancia's works team, HF Squadra Corse. He used a Lancia Flaminia to fight with the best from around Europe, at the circuits such as Nürburgring, Brands Hatch and Népliget Park, Budapest. It was at the later, that Facetti, paired with Luigi Cabella would score his first major international victory. Early 1964, he return to Formula Junior racing in Argentina, in the four race Temporada series for Scuderia Sant'Ambroeus. He took their Lotus-Ford 22 to a series best of fifth place in the Gran Premio Internacional Ciudad de Buenos Aires. "I was the Italian driver to run multiple editions of the race in South America. There I had the pleasure of meeting the great Juan Manuel Fangio and later become good friends and we were often in competition in Buenos Aires and Mar del Plata." After returning from South America, he runs a Formula Three teams with Jo Siffert and Clay Regazzoni, then participates himself in 1965. Back with Scuderia Sant'Ambroeus, he finished second the Campionato Italiano driving a Brabham-Ford BT16.

=== Autodelta years ===
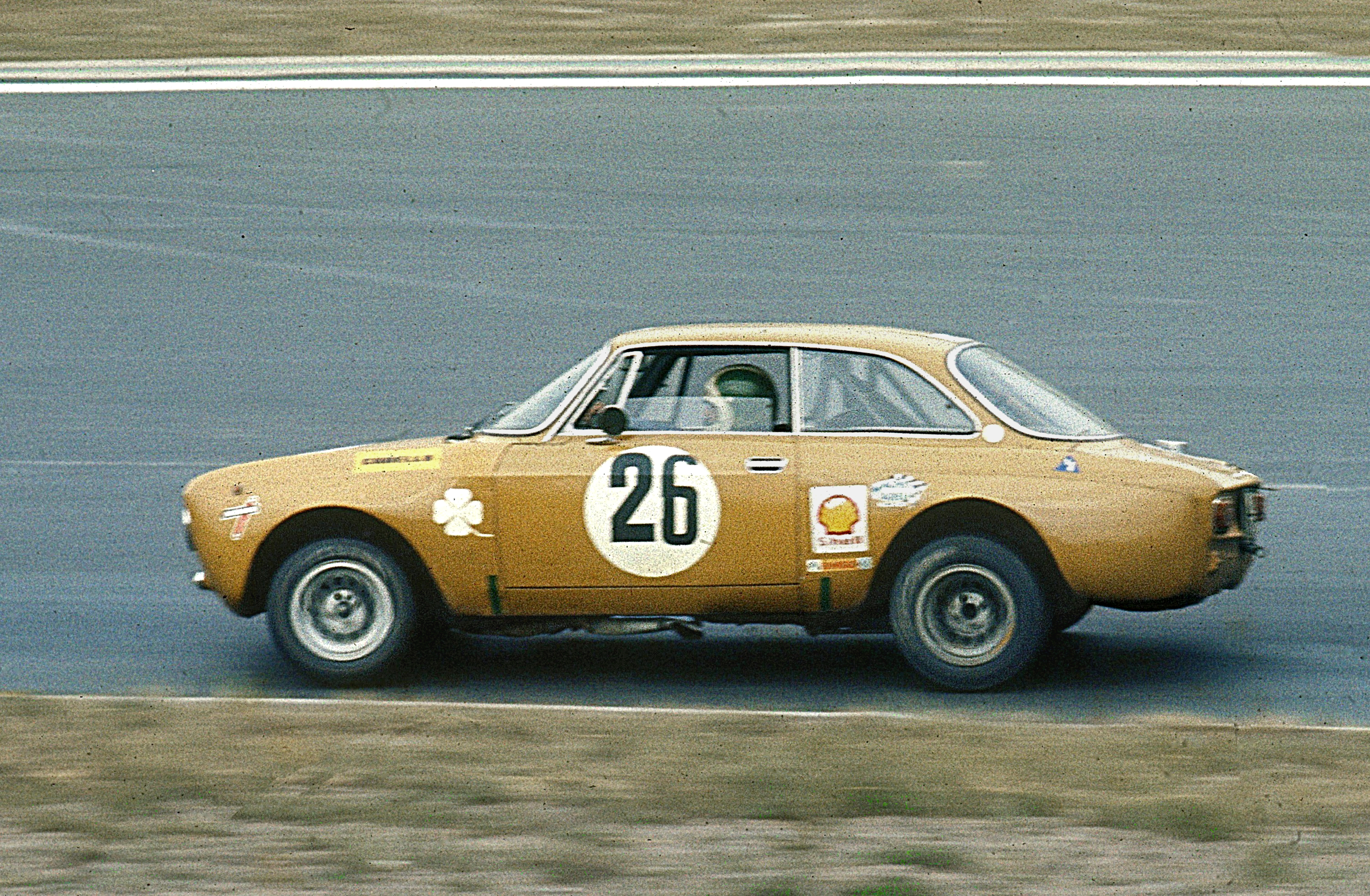
Facetti on Alfa Romeo Giulia GTAm at Nürburgring in 1973

Come 1969, Facetti was employed by Autodelta, the competition department of Alfa Romeo. He was hired to help development their sportscars and race in the European Touring Car Championship. Amongst other he teamed up with was Ignazio Giunti and Nino Vaccarella. During this period, Facetti finished third in the Spa 24 Hours twice.

In 1973, he was racing the team's Alfa Romeo T33/TT in the World Championship for Makes. After switch co-drivers in 1974, he was now partnered by Andrea de Adamich. This resulted in him visiting the podium on four occasions, the best being second in the 1000 km Österreichring.

Facetti, inside his Alfa Romeo 33TT12, and teammate Andrea de Adamich (left) during a pit stop at Monza in 1974

By the end of the season, Autodelta had finished fourth in the overall standing, but Facetti collaboration with Alfa Romeo was over, after winning the Italian title. "[He] was going through a period of crisis: [he] worked a lot with little satisfaction on a personal level. However, [he] won the Italian title, but that does not stop [him] from leaving Autodelta. As [he] ran at the Mugello Circuit, Cesare Fiorio tells [him], 'I have to tell you about an interesting program… A few days later, [he] was in Fiorio office, offered [him] the development of the engine for the Stratos. [He] would be working with Mike Parkes, to give the engine fuel injection and 4-valve head."

=== 1974 Italian Grand Prix ===
Facetti tried to qualify for the Gran Premio d'Italia in a Scuderia Finotto prepared Brabham-Cosworth BT42. He was entered in the place of Helmut Koinigg, but neither driver, despite their best efforts were simply not enough to qualify the car. But there was some mystery surrounding Facetti entry for Monza. With Facetti already due in the car for the meeting, an entry was provisionally received for Jean-Louis Lafosse, but reject by the organizers, leaving the team to tend the No. 31 Brabham of Facetti.

=== Lancia Stratos ===
Facetti between 1975 and 1976, was a racer and designer for Lancia, participating in the European Championship for Grand Touring cars. While Facetti immediately begins working on a 24-valve version of the Dino V6 engine, he was racing them. He was leading the Giro d'Italia Automobilistico when he retired with Gearbox problems. "They were three Stratros on the Giro that year; a turbo-charged 2-valve carburetor for Munari, a Pinto and [his] 4 valves with indirect injectons. [He] retired because [he] was too stressed keeping the engine level with the much more powerful Alfa Romeo Tipo 33 prototype of Jean-Claude Andruet". Although the Frenchman retired before Facetti, his Statros was out of the fight really battered... "In Casale, in a final step before arrival, broke a connecting rod first, then infill the injection pump and finally fire!"

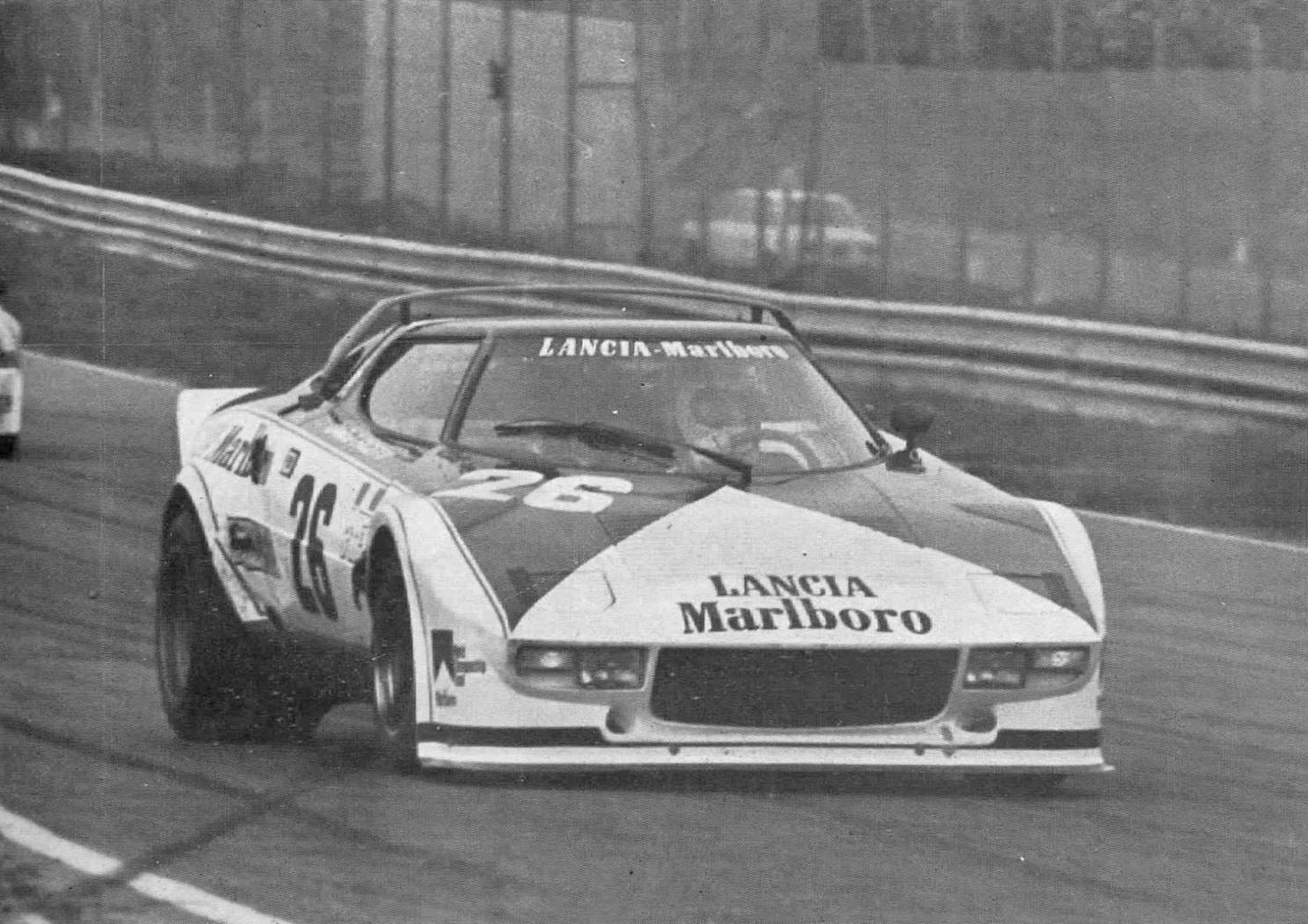
Facetti on Lancia Stratos HF 320 hp at Imola in 1975

1976 saw the arrival of Silhouette, of Group 5 "Special Production Car" category. With it, Lancia switched to the World Championship for Makes, and accepted the challenge from Porsche who took their monstrous 935 Turbo and BMW, with their reliable 3.5 CSL using the Lancia Stratos Turbo, prepared by Facetti, under the supervision of Parkes. The Stratos was not up to the challenge and following the death of Parkes in August 1977, the collaboration between Facetti and Lancia ended, along with the Silhouette program. His last commitment for Lancia saw him win the Giro d'Italia, with the Silhouette version.

=== Return to the ETCC ===
For the following season, Facetti successfully returned to the ETCC with a new partner, Martino Finotto, and a new car, a BMW 3.0 CSL, while participating in select World Championship Group 5 races in a Porsche 935. The new partnership started with a podium finish in the 1977 24 Hours of Daytona. Despite having to drive their Jolly Club entered Porsche 935 very carefully and with low boost from the start, they did finish second, as well winning their class.

The returning to the ETCC was a winning one. In Finotto's ex-Luigi BMW form the previous season, and joined by Umberto Grano for the season opener at Monza, the all-Italian were the only contender for victory once the work-supported Jaguars and Alpina BMWs had retired. This trio followed this was second place at Mugello, albeit three laps behind another Luigi BMW. This result promoted Facetti into the lead of the drivers' championship. The Enna round was Grano dropped, but Facetti and Finotto lead the 500 km race from start to finish, leading home the clear sweep of the podium by the BMW CSLs of Luigi Racing.

A trip to Czechoslovakia, saw Facetti/Finotto triumph once again, beating the more fancied teams for the third time in five rounds. This after their BMW had survived an engine rebuild following qualifying, helping Facetti move clear in the championship, with Finotto being his nearest rival! After a number non-finishes, the pairing took third place at Jarama in Spain, and lost the lead in the title race to Dieter Quester. Going into the final round, Facetti was just 11 points behind. This round was held at Estoril, dominated by the changeable weather. As early leader, Grano (now racing for Alpina BMW) faltered, Facetti took his CSL past in the final few minutes of the four-hour race, and scored another win for himself and his partner, Finotto. Grano's second place with his partner, Quester secured the Austrian the championship by just six points.

For 1978, Finotto had brought the Alpina BMW CSL, and continued to share with Facetti. The first round of the 1978 European Touring Car Championship saw the car arrive at Brands Hatch, although two of the four BMW entered had used the supply of engines in qualifying and therefore did not start. The other remaining BMW was quicker in the hand of Grano and Tom Walkinshaw, but due to poor pit by the BMW Italia crew, Facetti/Finotto were able leading until three laps from the end, when Walkinshaw took over the lead. Fresh from their second place in England, Facetti/Finotto were only challenged by their tyres in the four hours event at Monza, eventually winning by seven laps.

In the Mugello race, Facetti and John Fitzpatrick diced the lead in the early stages of the race, only for the Englishman to drop away when his gear lever came loose. Facetti continued in the lead until Fitzpatrick retook it during a tyre stop. Soon afterwards, the car began to overheat with Finotto at the wheel and would eventually record a DNF. Facetti/Finotto soon returned to their winning ways when they took victory in the Austria-Trophäe, held at the Salzburgring. Facetti's pole lap was over a second faster by Gunnar Nilsson's time set the previous season set in the same car, albeit with an engine revised by Facetti with some 'Italian parts'.

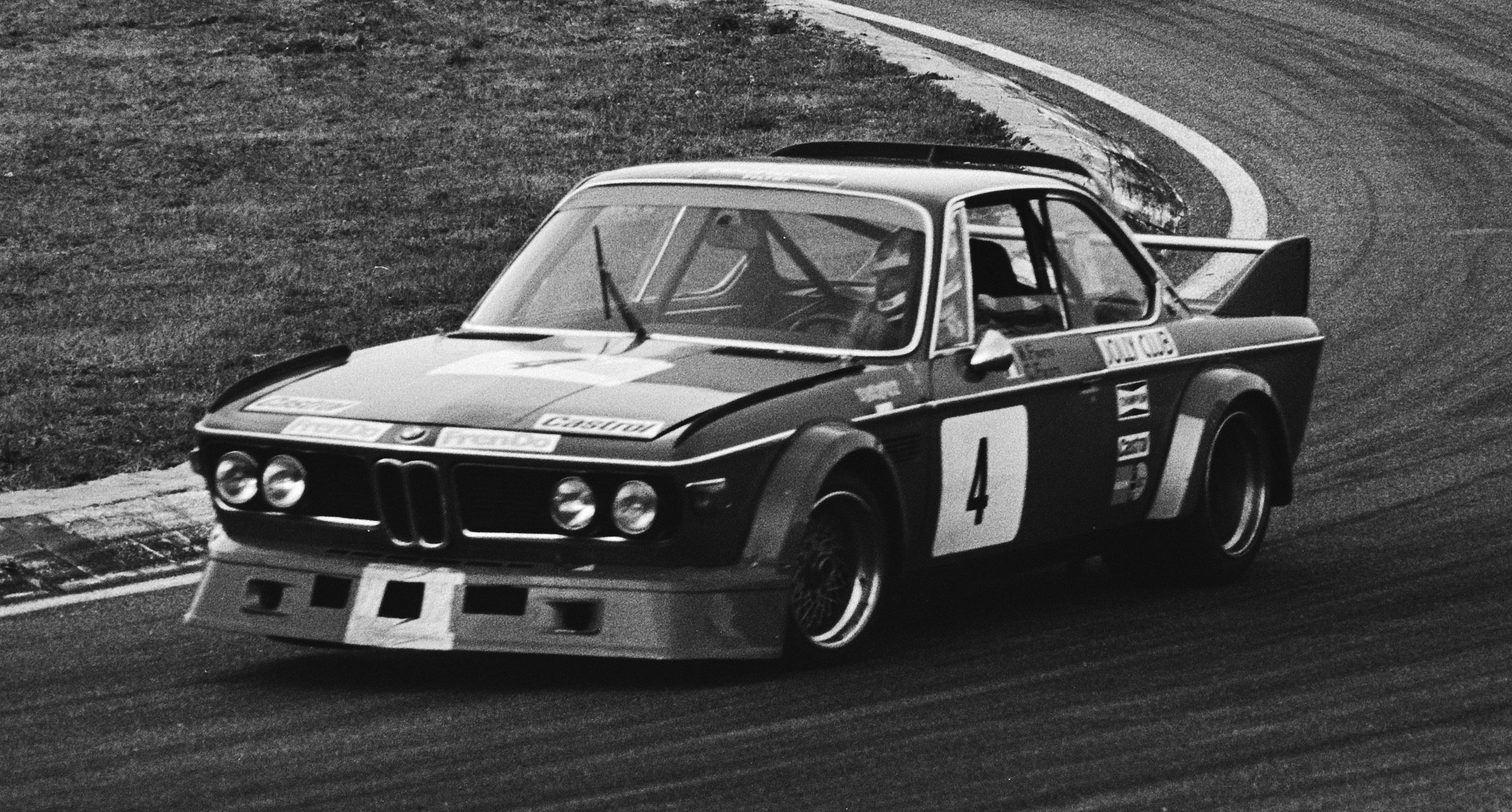
Facetti on Alpina BMW CLS at Zandvoort in 1979

After coming fifth at Jarama, Facetti suffered more bad luck in Estoril with a slipping clutch. As a result, saw Facetti/Finotto lose the championship lead. They retire with fuel feed problems on the Österreichring. But, returned to winning way when the series visited Czechoslovakia, when they trashed the opposition, finishing over an 11 km lap ahead of series leader, Grano. When the pair suffered an engine failure on the Nürburgring, they left the series only to return again in 1979.

After taking pole position for the 1979 6 Ore di Mugello in the 935, Facetti lead the race until a collision and he wound up in third at the end. After this WCM outing, Facetti returned to ETCC at Vallelunga. After 300 of the 500 km, Facetti/Finotto were amongst the leading BMWs, when Finotto pitted with boiling radiator; only moments later Eddy Joosen pitted with exactly the same problem. Repairs were made and both BMWs were back at full pace. At the end of 500 km, Facetti/Finotto were only nine seconds behind the winners Bruno Giacomelli/Grano/Joosen. The next ETCC race at Mugello, once again was a battle between the BMWs. Although the result was the same as before the margin of victory was down in just 2.6 seconds.

Facetti/Finotto had a dramatic time at Brands Hatch, when they lost the lead of the 500 km race. They were comfortably head of the field for 100 of the 120 laps, when the gear level broke in their old BMW CSL. After quick repairs, Facetti set off desperately to regain ground loss to the rival Luigi BMW. Just a few laps, he had a patch of oil and shot into the catch fencing surrounding the track. Another retirement at the next race, Jarama, this time due fuel feed problems. Their third DNF in a row was down the issues with the cooling system at Österreichring

Main rival for the 1979 title was Grano (Luigi BMW), and while he and Facetti/Finotto both suffered from blown head gaskets at Brno, the green Jolly Club BMW could salvage the car to second place the end of the race. The trip to the Nürburgring, saw the first time this season, the pair won a race after they took pole as well. Next on the ETCC agenda was Zandvoort, which saw the Jolly Club pairing head another BMW 1-2 finish. The BMW dominated the race at Salzburgring, taking all the steps of the podium, with Facetti/Finotto on the number one step, completing a hat-trick of victories.

When the ETCC visited Enna, once again it was a BMW festival, with a podium clean sweep, and after a spin by Finotto, the order was decided with the Jolly Club car in second. They went one better at Silverstone, by winning the RAC Tourist Trophy, with it the European Touring Car title. Their winning ways continued at Zolder, the pairs fifth victory in the last six races.

=== World Sportscars ===
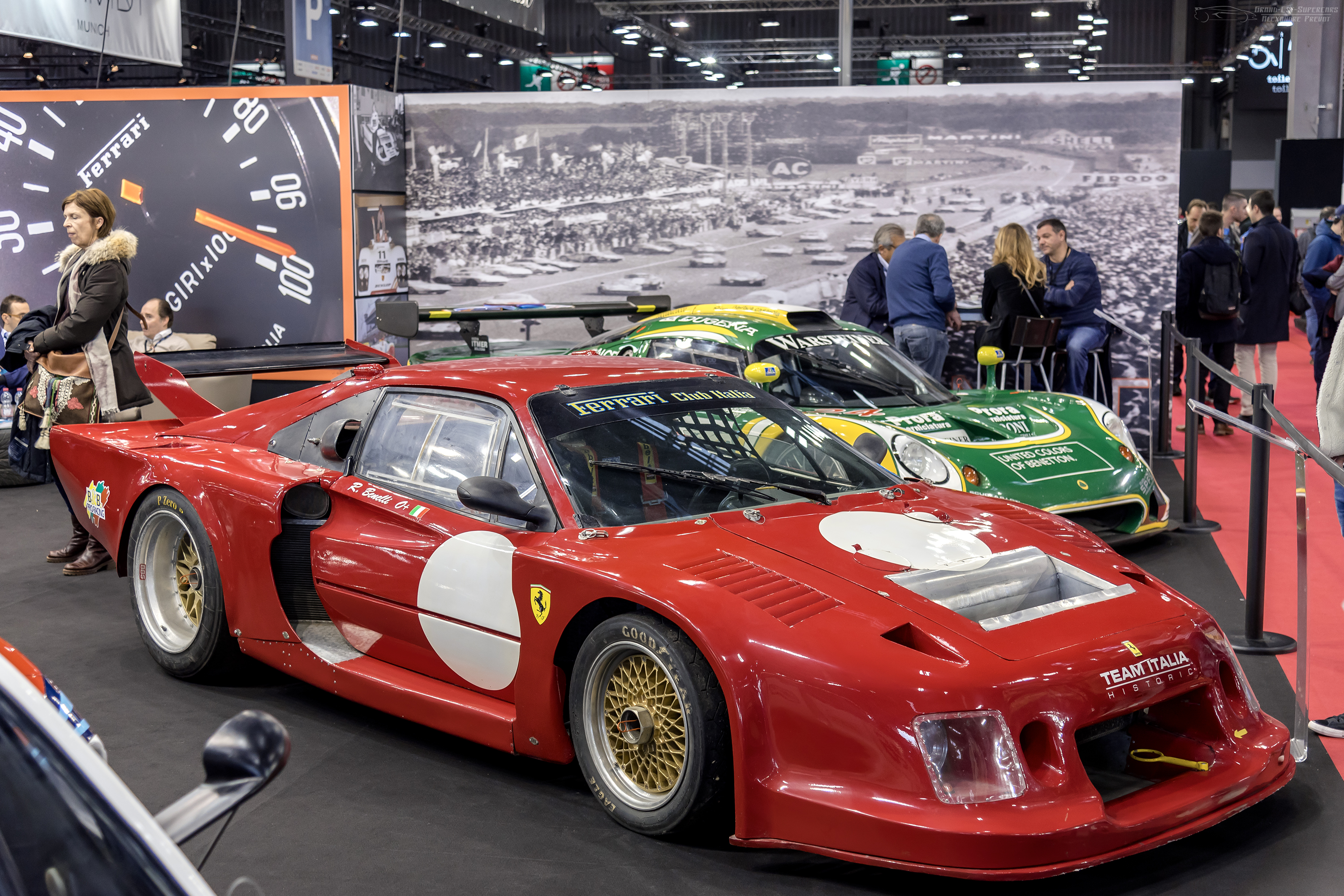
Ferrari 308 Carma FF by Facetti

By 1980, Facetti was in change at Achille Motors in Milan. This was a business venture with long-time racing partner Finotto. And that year, Lancia sold Finotto one of their brand new Lancia Beta Montecarlo Turbo the factory had been running in the World Championship Group 5, together Facetti and Finotto were able to add points the marque's total. For the 1981, they came up with idea of trying the challenge Porsche with a Ferrari.

With Maranello, only interested in Formula One, Facetti and Finotto decided to take on all-conquering Porsche 935s, even though their facilities at Archille Motors was hardly equal to Porsches. They chose the 3.0 liter Ferrari 308 GTB as their base model. As Group 5 was a Silhouette formula, Facetti know he could change a lot of things provided the car looked like the standard road version. This car they called Carma FF {CARlo Facetti and Martino Finotto and the FF for Facetti and Finotto}.

The standard 308 GTB was not in the same league as a 935, so Facetti designed his own cylinder heads and added two tugrochargers, and ended up with 700 bhp. He also threw away the front and rear subframes and went to Giorgio Stirano, who ran Alba Engineering to build lighter subframes that were merged with the Ferrari center tub. When the car arrive at 24 Hours of Daytona, the car looked like a real Italian special. In conversation, Facetti believed he would be able to turn up the boost in qualifying and get 840 bhp. Is he did, always the brave and gritty driver, putting the Ferrari sixth on the grid.

Facetti and Finotto also entered themselves as driver in their Lancia Beta Turbo, as they intended to race both cars over the 24 hours. It was not necessary, for Facetti drove the Carma flat out, setting the fastest lap in the race, before pitting after only five laps to retire with a cracked manifold and failed electrics. When the car next appeared at Mugello, they were in sixth place when the electric failed again. While at Monza, Facetti put the Carma FF on pole, only for the fuel pump pack up on the warm-up lap and they were out. A gearbox failure accounted for their DNF at Silverstone.

Only Facetti could wring a performance out of the car, that Finotto could not, yet both driver would have fear a trip to the Nürburgring. To no surprise, when Facetti completely lost it and crashed on the Nordschleife. The car appeared twice more. It was on pole at Enna, only to retire after three laps. Finally to the Kyalami Nine Hour race, it once again expired after being second fastest in practice.

For 1982, Facetti and Finotto decided against returning with the Carma and its twin-turbo 308 experiment, instead opting for more conventional Osella-BMW PA9, but equally unsuccessful as they failed to finish a race in the car that season.

1983 saw the introduction of a new category into World Sportscars, Group C Junior. As Facetti and Finotto knew they could not complete on level terms with the might of Porsche, Finotto commissioned Stirano to build a car to these new regulations, while Facetti designed and built a 1.8 litre, four-cylinder turbocharged engine. Since power units had to be ascribed to a recognised manufacturer, the team became known as Giannini-Alba, then Carma FF from 1985. The first car, Alba AR2 was a regular class winner with Facetti and Finotto at the helm in 1983, helping Alba to win the Group C Junior Cup. By 1984, this pairing were winless but still assisted Alba to win the Group C2 Prototype FIA Cup.

The Alba AR6 continued to use Facetti's engine for the 1985 season, the team lost reliability with it, trying to keep up with pace-setter Gordon Spice, Finotto turned his attention to the IMSA Camel Lights category in America for 1986. Finotto and Facetti, who prepared the overhead camshaft Ferrari engines, joined forces with Gaston Andrey Racing and enrolled fellow Italian, Ruggero Melgrati, who proved to be pace-setter in the Lights division. The team rarely enjoyed reliability to match, but Melgrati and Facetti shared success at Grand Prix of Palm Beach and Löwenbräu Classic.

Facetti only returned to cockpit of an Alba once more after the season in the US, and that was a non-championship, Kyalami 500 km in 1988. He then retire full-time from International motor sport, albeit bar a one-off outing in a Ferrari F355, where he finished fourth in a round of the Coppa GT Special at Mugello in 1995.

== Racing record ==
=== Career highlights ===
Season	Series	Position	Team	Car
1960	Campionato Italiano	17th	Carlo Facetti	Facetti-Lancia
1960	Campionato A.N.P.E.C/Auto Italiana d'Europe	23rd	Carlo Facetti	Facetti-Lancia
1960	Prova Addestrativa	25th	Carlo Facetti	Facetti-Lancia
1962	Campionato Italiano	12th	Scuderia Ambrosiana	de Sanctis-Ford
1962	GT Trophy	**1st**		Alfa Romeo Giulietta SZ
1962	Coppa D'Autunno	3rd		Alfa Romeo Giulietta SZ
1963	European Touring Car Challenge	25th	HF Squadra Corse	Lancia Flaminia
1964	Coppa dell'Autodromo di Monza	3rd	Antonio Branca	Branca-Ford
1964	24 Hours of Spa	3rd		Alfa Romeo 2600 Sprint
1965	Campionato Italiano	2nd	Scuderia Sant'Ambroeus	Brabham-Ford BT16
1965	Trofeo Luigi Musso	2nd	Scuderia Sant'Ambroeus	Brabham-Ford BT16
1967	Int. DMV Avus-Rennen	2nd		Porsche 906
1967	Trofeo Ettore Bettoja	3rd		Porsche 910
1968	European Touring Car Challenge – Division 2	10th	HF Squadra Corse; Jolly Club Milano	Lancia Fulvia HF
1968	1968 Temporada Argentina	11th	Tecno Racing Team	Tecno-Cosworth 68
1969	European Touring Car Challenge – Division 2	8th	Autodelta S.p.A.	Alfa Romeo 1300 GTA Junior
1970	Mil Milhas Brasileiras	3rd		Alfa Romeo T33/2 Spyder
1971	Campionato Italiano Sport	**1st**		Chevron-Ford B19
1972	European Touring Car Championship	10th	Autodelta S.p.A.	Alfa Romeo 2000 GTAm; Alfa Romeo 1300 GTAm
1972	British Saloon Car Championship	28th	Autodelta S.p.A.	Alfa Romeo 1300 GTA Junior
1973	British Saloon Car Championship	38th	Autodelta S.p.A.	Alfa Romeo 2000 GTAm
1974	Campionato Italiano Sport	**1st**	Scuderia Bresica Corse	Lola-Ford T290
1975	European Touring Car Championship	23rd	Castrol Team Zakspeed/Jolly Club	Ford Escort RS 1600
1976	Giro d'Italia Automobilistico	**1st**		Lancia Stratos Turbo
1977	European Touring Car Championship	2nd	Luigi Racing	BMW 3.0 CSL
1978	European Touring Car Championship	4th	Jolly Club	BMW 3.0 CSL
1979	European Touring Car Championship	**1st**	Jolly Club	BMW 3.0 CSL
1980	World Challenge for Endurance Drivers	36th	Jolly Club; Plastic Bertrand Racing	Lancia Beta Montecarlo Turbo; Ferrari 308 GTB; BMW 530i
1981	World Endurance Championship of Drivers	69th	Jolly Club; Carma FF; Martini Racing	Lancia Beta Montecarlo Turbo; Ferrari 308 GTB
1983	European Endurance Championship	44th	Jolly Club	Alba-Giannini AR2
1983	World Endurance Championship of Drivers	63rd	Jolly Club	Osella-Giannini PA9; Alba-Giannini AR2
1984	World Endurance Championship of Drivers	53rd	Jolly Club	Alba-Giannini AR2
1985	FIA World Endurance Championship	42nd	Carma FF	Alba-Carma AR2; Alba-Carma AR6
1986	IMSA Camel GTP Lights Championship	21st	Gaston Andrey Racing	Alba-Ferrari AR6; Tiga-Ferrari GT286

=== Complete Formula One results ===
(key)

Year	Entrant	Chassis	Engine	1	2	3	4	5	6	7	8	9	10	11	12	13	14	15	WDC	Points
1974	Scuderia Finotto	Brabham BT42	Cosworth V8	ARG	BRA	RSA	ESP	BEL	MON	SWE	NED	FRA	GBR	GER	AUT	ITA; DNQ	CAN	USA	NC	0

=== Complete European Formula Two Championship results ===
(key) (Races in bold indicate pole position; races in italics indicate *fastest lap)

Year	Entrant	Chassis	Engine	1	2	3	4	5	6	7	8	9	Pos.	Pts
1968	Tecno Racing Team	Tecno 68	Cosworth FVA	HOC; NC	THR	JAR	CRY	TUL	ZAN	PER	HOC		NC	0
1968	Scuderia Picchio Rossa	Tecno 68	Cosworth FVA									VAL; 12	NC	0
1969	Scuderia Picchio Rossa	Tecno 68	Cosworth FVA	THR	HOC	NÜR	JAR	TUL	PER; DNS	VAL			NC	0

=== Complete British Saloon Car Championship results ===
(key) (Races in bold indicate pole position; races in italics indicate fastest lap.)

Year	Team	Car	Class	1	2	3	4	5	6	7	8	9	10	Pos.	Pts	Class
1972	Autodelta S.p.A.	Alfa Romeo 1300 GTA Junior	B	BRH	OUL	THR	SIL	CRY	BRH	OUL	SIL ovr:6 cls:1	MAL	BRH	28th	9	9th
1973	Autodelta S.p.A.	Alfa Romeo 2000 GTAm	C	BRH	SIL	THR	THR	SIL	ING	BRH	SIL ovr:6 cls:3	BRH		38th	4	10th

=== Complete 24 Hours of Le Mans results ===
Year	Team	Co-Drivers	Car	Class	Laps	Pos.	Class Pos.
1968	(Italy) Autodelta S.p.A.	(Italy) Spartaco Dini	Alfa Romeo T33/2	P2.0	315	5th	**2nd**
1970	(Italy) Autodelta S.p.A.	(Italy) Teodoro Zeccoli	Alfa Romeo T33/3	P3.0	43	DNF	DNF
1973	(Italy) Ecurie Brescia Corse	(Italy) Sergio Morando (Italy) Teodoro Zeccoli	Alfa Romeo T33/TT/3	S3.0	299	15th	7th
1974	(Italy) BMW Jolly Club	(West Germany) Manfred Mohr (Italy) Martino Finotto	BMW 3.0 CSL	T	155	DNF	DNF
1975	(United States) North American Racing Team	(United States) Ronnie Bucknum	Ferrari 365 GTB/4	GT	-	DNS	DNS
1975	(United States) North American Racing Team	(France) Jean-Pierre Malcher (France) Patrick Langlois	Ferrari 365 GTB/4	GT	-	DNS	DNS
1975	(United States) North American Racing Team	(France) Lucien Guitteny (France) Jacky Haran (United States) Ronnie Bucknum (Italy) Giancarlo Gagliardi	Ferrari 365 GTB/4	GT	-	DNS	DNS
1980	(Italy) Jolly Club – Lancia Corse	(Italy) Martino Finotto	Lanica Beta Montecarlo Turbo	Gr.5	273	19th	**2nd**
1981	(Italy) Martini Racing	(United States) Eddie Cheever (Italy) Michele Alboreto	Lancia Beta Montecarlo Turbo	Gr.5	323	8th	**2nd**
1983	(Italy) Scuderia Jolly Club	(Italy) Martino Finotto (Switzerland) Marco Vanoli	Alba-Giannini AR2	C Jr	158	DNF	DNF
1984	(Italy) Jolly Club	(Italy) Martino Finotto (Switzerland) Marco Vanoli	Alba-Giannini AR2	C2	258	21st	7th

=== Complete 24 Hours of Daytona results ===
Year	Team	Co-Drivers	Car	Class	Laps	Pos.	Class Pos.
1968	(United States) Algar Enterprises	(Italy) Giancarlo Baghetti (Sweden) Ove Andersson	Lancia Fulvia HF	P	180	DNF	DNF
1977	(Italy) Jolly Club	(Italy) Martino Finotto (Switzerland) Romeo Camathias	Porsche 935	Gr.5	679	**2nd**	**1st**
1978	(Italy) Jolly Club	(Italy) Martino Finotto	Porsche 935	GTX	6	DNF	DNF
1979	(Italy) Jolly Club – Sportswagen Racing Team	(Italy) Martino Finotto (Italy) Giampiero Moretti	Porsche 935	GTX	164	DNF	DNF
1980	(Italy) Jolly Club	(Italy) Martino Finotto	Lanica Beta Montecarlo Turbo	GTX	597	10th	6th
1981	(Italy) Jolly Club	(Italy) Martino Finotto	Ferrari 308 GTB Turbo	GTX	4	DNF	DNF
1981	(Italy) Jolly Club Italia	(Italy) Martino Finotto (Italy) Emanuele Pirro	Lanica Beta Montecarlo Turbo	GTX	609	5th	**3rd**

=== Complete 12 Hours of Sebring results ===
Year	Team	Co-Drivers	Car	Class	Laps	Pos.	Class Pos.
1962	(Italy) Scuderia Ambrosiana	(Italy) Massimo Leto di Priolo	Alfa Romeo Giulietta Veloce	GT1.3	178	12th	**2nd**
1986	(United States) Gaston Andrey Racing	(Italy) Martino Finotto (Italy) Ruggero Melgarti	Alba-Ferrari AR6	Lights	41	DNF	DNF

=== Complete 24 Hours of Spa results ===
Year	Team	Co-Drivers	Car	Class	Laps	Pos.	Class Pos.
1964		(Italy) Giancarlo Galimberti	Alfa Romeo 2600 Sprint	TC	269	**3rd**	**2nd**
1969	(Italy) Autodelta	(Italy) Spartaco Dini	Alfa Romeo 1300 GTA Junior	Div.2		DNF	DNF
1970	(Italy) Autodelta S.P.A.	(Italy) Teodore Zeccoli	Alfa Romeo 2000 GTA	Div.3/Gr.2		**3rd**	**3rd**
1971	(Italy) Autodelta S.P.A.	(Netherlands) Toine Hezemans	Alfa Romeo 2000 GTAm	Div.2	289	**3rd**	**1st**
1972	(Italy) Autodelta	(Italy) Carlo Truci	Alfa Romeo 1300 GTA Junior	Div.1	269	23rd	**2nd**
1973	(Italy) Autodelta Spa	(Italy) Massimo Larini	Alfa Romeo 2000 GTAm	Div.1		DNF	DNF
1974	(Italy) Autodelta S.p.A.	(Italy) Spartaco Dini	Alfa Romeo 2000 GTV	Div.4		DNF	DNF
1977	(Italy) Autodelta S.p.A.	(Italy) Spartaco Dini (Italy) Alessandro Uberti	Alfa Romeo Alfetta GTV	T2.5	-	DNQ	
1977	(Italy) Autodelta S.p.A.	(Italy) Spartaco Dini	Alfa Romeo Alfetta GTV	T2.5		DNF	DNF
1977	(Italy) Autodelta S.p.A.	(Italy) Giorgio Francia (Italy) Amerigo Bigliazzi	Alfa Romeo Alfetta GTV	T2.5	273	4th	**2nd**
1979	(Italy) Luigi Racing	(Belgium) Teddy Pilette	Chevrolet Camaro Z28	serT+2.5		DNF	DNF
1980	(Belgium) Plastic Bertrand	(Belgium) Pascal Witmeur (Belgium) Jean-Jacques Feider	BMW 530i	serT+2.5	114	DNF	DNF

=== Complete Mil Milhas Brasil results ===
Year	Team	Co-Drivers	Car	Laps	Pos.
1970	(Italy)	(Italy) Giovanni Alberti	Alfa Romeo T33/2 Spyder	198	**3rd**

Sporting positions
Preceded by Umberto Grano	European Touring Car Championship; Champion; 1979; With: Martino Finotto	Succeeded by Helmut Kelleners; Siegfried Müller Jr.
