= Gérard Larrousse =

French racing driver (born 1940)

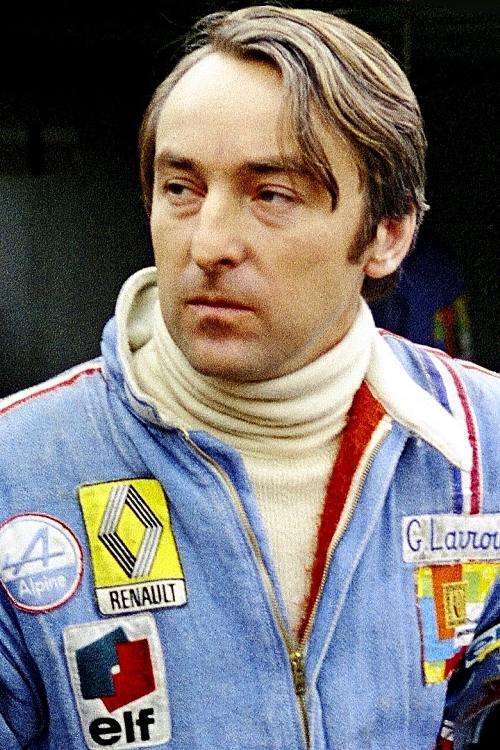
- Larrousse, pictured in 1975
- Born: Gérard Gilles Marie Armand Larrousse; 23 May 1940 (age 86); Lyon, France

Formula One World Championship career
- Nationality: (France) French
- Active years: 1974
- Team: Scuderia Finotto
- Entries: 2 (1 start)
- Championships: 0
- Wins: 0
- Podiums: 0
- Career points: 0
- Pole positions: 0
- Fastest laps: 0
- First entry: 1974 Belgian Grand Prix
- Last entry: 1974 French Grand Prix

Gérard Gilles Marie Armand Larrousse (born 23 May 1940) is a former sports car racing, rallying and Formula One driver from France. His greatest success as a driver was winning the 24 Hours of Le Mans in 1973 and 1974, driving a Matra-Simca MS670. After the end of his career as racing car driver, he continued to be involved in Formula One as a team manager for Renault. He later founded and ran his own Formula One team, Larrousse, from 1987 to 1994.

== Racing career ==
Born in Lyon, Larrousse began his motorsport career in rallying before focusing on circuit racing. He won the French Rally Championship with an Alpine A110. His biggest successes in international rallies came in a Porsche 911. He won the Tour de Corse in 1969, and placed second at the Monte Carlo Rally in 1969, 1970 and 1972. On gravel, he achieved a sixth place at the 1970 RAC Rally.

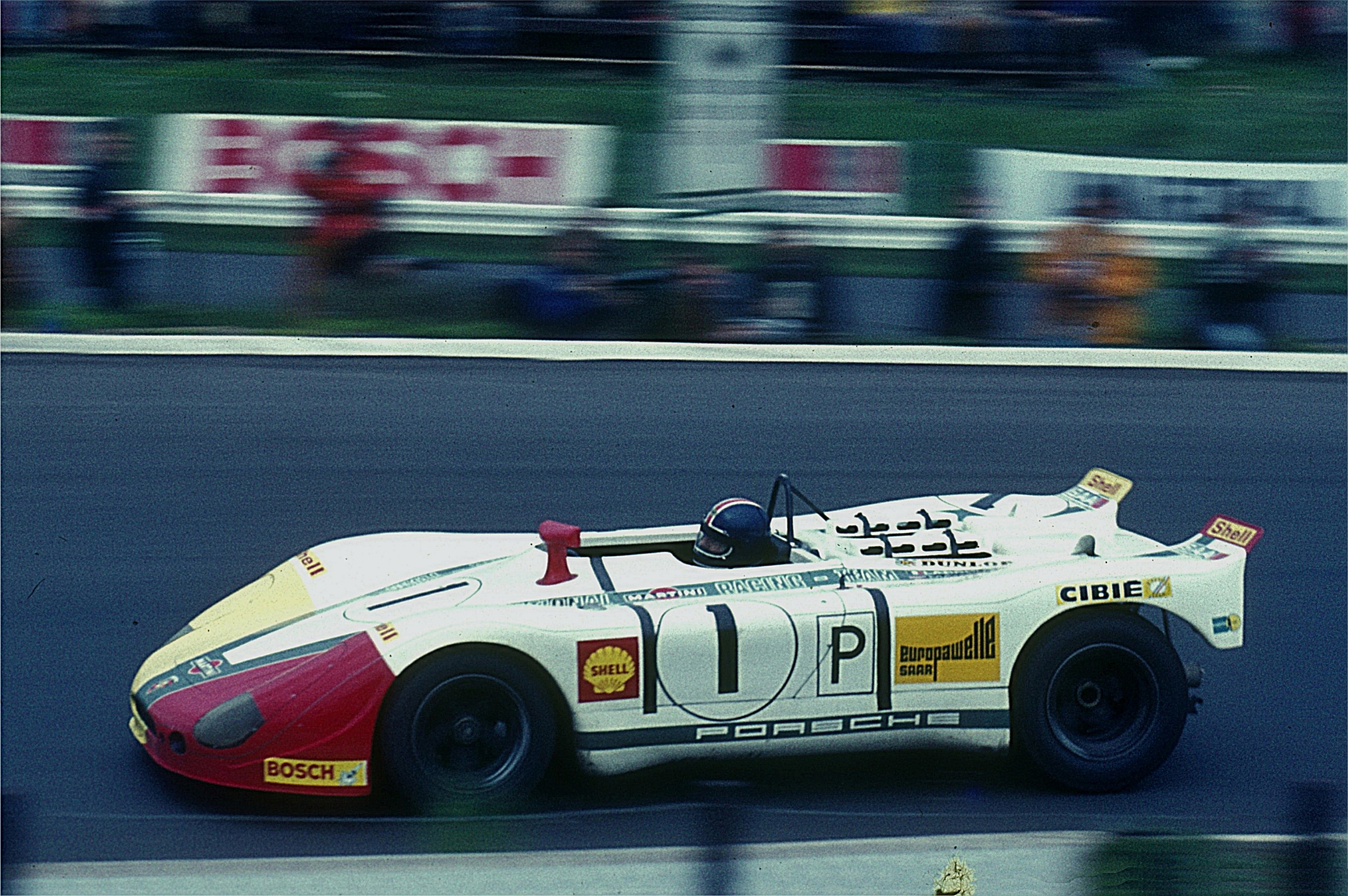
Gérard Larrousse driving a Porsche 908/2 at the Nürburgring in 1970

In a team with Vic Elford in 1971, Larrousse won the 12 Hours of Sebring with a Porsche 917K and the 1000km Nürburgring in a Porsche 908/03. He would follow this with victory at the 24 Hours of Le Mans in 1973 and 1974 alongside Henri Pescarolo for Matra-Simca. He participated in two Grands Prix, debuting on 12 May 1974, but failed to any score championship points. He drove Brabham BT42s for Scuderia Finotto.

== Team management ==
Following his sports car career, he moved into racing management, running the Elf Switzerland operation in the European Formula Two Championship. From there, Larrousse went on to run the original factory Renault Formula One team during its final days as a full-fledged factory team in 1984 and 1985.

Larrousse also shared ownership of an eponymous Formula One team with various partners, from 1987 to 1994. His team achieved limited success in F1, with a best finish of sixth in the Constructor's Championship in 1990. However the team struggled in following seasons and by 1994, Larrousse was forced to run several pay-drivers to help make ends meet. Although plans were in place to participate in the 1995 season, a lack of funds meant that the team was forced to withdraw from Formula One.

== Racing record ==
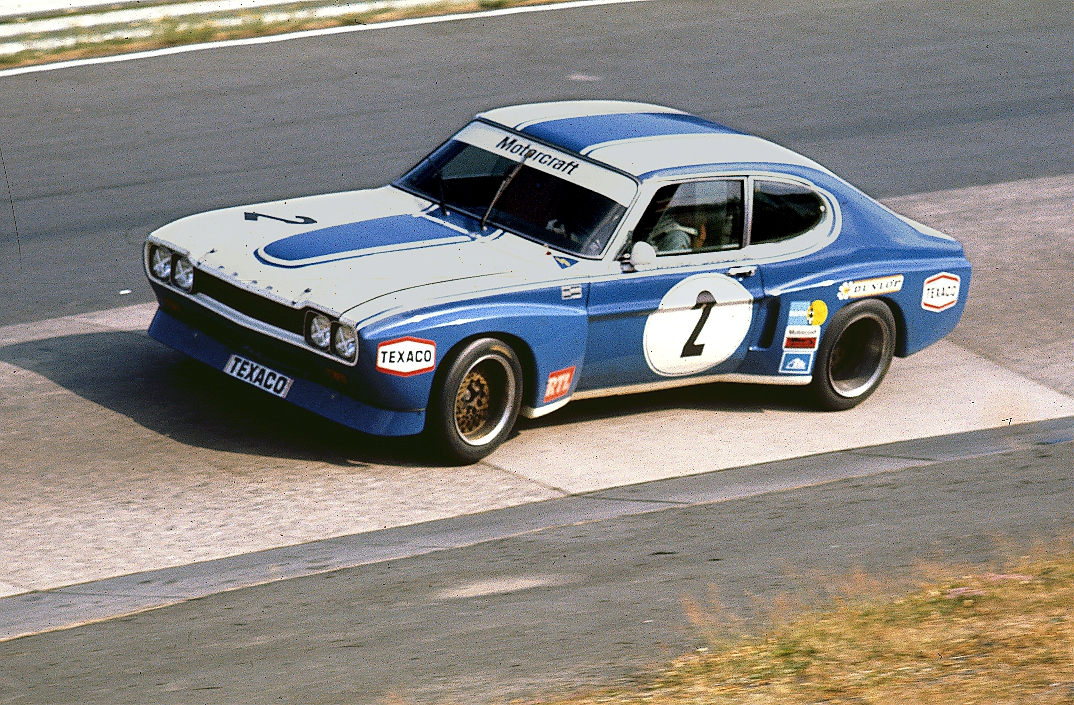
With Ford Capri RS in 1973 at 6 hours of Nürburgring

=== Formula One World Championship results ===
(key)

| Year | Entrant | Chassis | Engine | 1 | 2 | 3 | 4 | 5 | 6 | 7 | 8 | 9 | 10 | 11 | 12 | 13 | 14 | 15 | WDC | Pts. |
|---|---|---|---|---|---|---|---|---|---|---|---|---|---|---|---|---|---|---|---|---|
| 1974 | Scuderia Finotto | Brabham BT42 | Ford V8 | ARG | BRA | RSA | ESP | BEL; Ret | MON | SWE | NED | FRA; DNQ | GBR | GER | AUT | ITA | CAN | USA | NC | 0 |

=== Complete 24 Hours of Le Mans results ===
| Year | Team | Co-Drivers | Car | Class | Laps | Pos. | Class Pos. |
|---|---|---|---|---|---|---|---|
| 1967 | (France) Ecurie Savin-Calberson | (France) Patrick Depailler | Alpine A210 | P 1.15 | 204 | DNF | DNF |
| 1968 | (France) Société des Automobiles Alpine | (France) Henri Grandsire | Alpine A220 | P 3.0 | 204 | DNF | DNF |
| 1969 | (Germany) Porsche System Engineering | (Germany) Hans Herrmann | Porsche 908 Coupé | P 3.0 | 372 | 2nd | 1st |
| 1970 | (Germany) Martini Racing Team | (Germany) Willi Kauhsen | Porsche 917L | S 5.0 | 338 | 2nd | 2nd |
| 1971 | (Germany) Martini Racing Team | (United Kingdom) Vic Elford | Porsche 917LH | S 5.0 | | DNF | DNF |
| 1972 | Ecurie Bonnier Switzerland | (Sweden) Jo Bonnier (Netherlands) Gijs van Lennep | Lola T280-Ford Cosworth | S 3.0 | 213 | DNF | DNF |
| 1973 | (France) Equipe Matra-Simca Shell | (France) Henri Pescarolo | Matra-Simca MS670B | S 3.0 | 355 | 1st | 1st |
| 1974 | (France) Equipe Gitanes | (France) Henri Pescarolo | Matra-Simca MS670C | S 3.0 | 337 | 1st | 1st |

=== Complete IMC results ===
| Year | Entrant | Car | 1 | 2 | 3 | 4 | 5 | 6 | 7 | 8 | 9 |
|---|---|---|---|---|---|---|---|---|---|---|---|
| 1970 | Porsche System Engineering | Porsche 911 S | MON; 2 | SWE | ITA | KEN | AUT | GRE | GBR; 6 | | |
| 1971 | Porsche System Engineering | Porsche 914/6 | MON; Ret | SWE | ITA | KEN | MAR | AUT | GRE | GBR | |
| 1972 | Porsche System Engineering | Porsche 911 S | MON; 2 | SWE | KEN | MAR | GRE | AUT | ITA | USA | GBR |

Sporting positions
| Preceded by Henri Pescarolo; Graham Hill | Winner of the 24 Hours of Le Mans; 1973-1974; With: Henri Pescarolo | Succeeded by Jacky Ickx; Derek Bell |
