= Brabham BT42 =

Formula One racing car

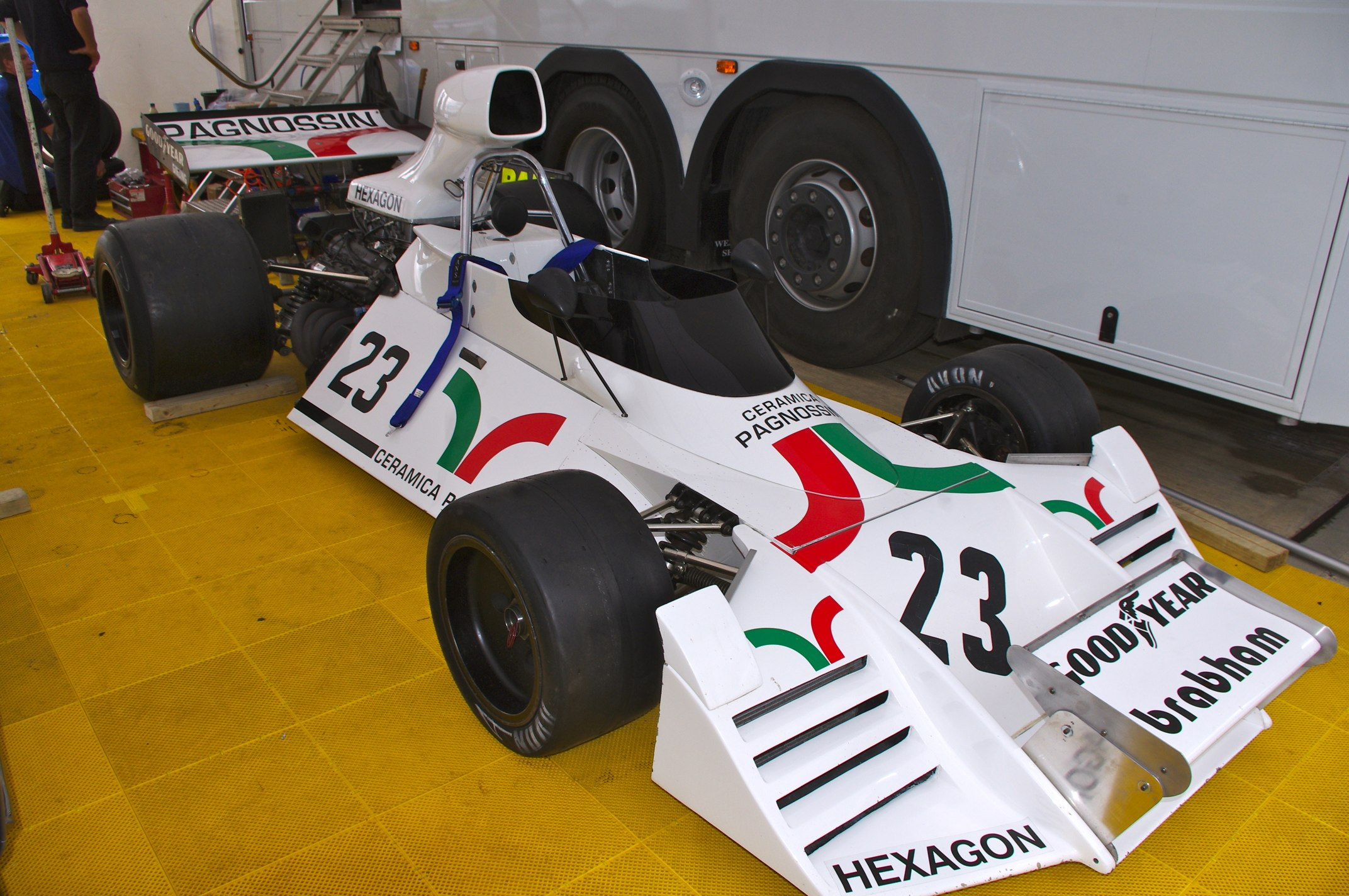
- Brabham BT42 (2011)
- Category: Formula One
- Designer: Gordon Murray
- Predecessor: Brabham BT37
- Successor: Brabham BT44

Technical specifications
- Chassis: Triangular section monocoque
- Suspension (front): Rising rate pullrod actuated
- Suspension (rear): Multi-link
- Wheelbase: 2388mm
- Engine: Cosworth DFV 3.000cc
- Transmission: Hewland 5-Speed + Reverse
- Tyres: Goodyear

Competition history
- Notable entrants: Motor Racing Developments
- Notable drivers: (Argentina) Carlos Reutemann; (Brazil) Wilson Fittipaldi; (Australia) Helmuth Koinigg; (Italy) Lella Lombardi; (Germany) Rolf Stommelen; (United Kingdom) John Watson; (Italy) Andrea de Adamich
- Debut: 1973 Spanish Grand Prix
Races	Wins	Podiums	Poles	F/Laps
27	0	2	0	0

The Brabham BT42 was a Formula One racing car used by Brabham for the 1973 Formula One season. This car marked the team's first design entirely by Gordon Murray after the departure of team co-founder and previous designer Ron Tauranac.

== Development ==
Gordon Murray became chief designer after being offered the role by new team boss Bernie Ecclestone. The car proposed a triangular section alluminium monocoque, with the by then ubiquitous Cosworth DFV as a fully stressed member paired with a Hewland gearbox.

The car featured rising rate pullrod actuated front suspension and a multilink rear suspension. It was fitted with Goodyear tyres.

The most striking part of the car being the angular yet simple bodywork design which Murray himself refers to as "triangular". As well as the return of the BT34's front mounted double radiators nick-named "Lobster Claw". Aditionally, the downward sloping sidepods gave the car an even more unique look, yet served to fit one fuel cell underneath each side. Allowing to mount a smaller, triangular main fuel cell behind the driver, moving the center of gravity towards the rear, improving responsiveness.

The car was a marked improvement from the previous years' BT37 with Carlos Reutemann scoring best place results in France and The United States. The BT42 became the base upon which the successful Brabham BT44 would be designed.

== Formula One World Championship results ==
(key) (results in bold indicate pole position, results in italics indicate fastest lap)

Year	Entrant	Engine	Tyres	Drivers	1	2	3	4	5	6	7	8	9	10	11	12	13	14	15	Pts	WCC
1973	Motor Racing Developments	Cosworth DFV	G		ARG	BRA	RSA	SPA	BEL	MON	SWE	FRA	GBR	NED	GER	AUS	ITA	CAN	USA	**22**^{1}	4th
1973	Motor Racing Developments	Cosworth DFV	G	Carlos Reutemann				Ret	Ret	Ret	4	3	6	Ret	Ret	4	6	8	3	**22**^{1}	4th
1973	Motor Racing Developments	Cosworth DFV	G	Wilson Fittipaldi Júnior				10	Ret	11	Ret	16	Ret	Ret	5	Ret	Ret	11	17	**22**^{1}	4th
1973	Ceramica Pagnossin MRD	Cosworth DFV	G	Andrea de Adamich									Ret							**22**^{1}	4th
1973	Ceramica Pagnossin MRD	Cosworth DFV	G	Rolf Stommelen											11	Ret	12	12		**22**^{1}	4th
1973	Ceramica Pagnossin MRD	Cosworth DFV	G	John Watson															Ret	**22**^{1}	4th
1974	Goldie Hexagon Racing	Cosworth DFV	F		ARG	BRA	RSA	SPA	BEL	MON	SWE	NED	FRA	GBR	GER	AUS	ITA	CAN	USA	**35**^{1}	5th
1974	Goldie Hexagon Racing	Cosworth DFV	F	John Watson	12	Ret	Ret	11	11	6	11	7	16	11						**35**^{1}	5th
1974	Goldie Hexagon Racing	Cosworth DFV	F	Carlos Pace									DNQ							**35**^{1}	5th
1974	Scuderia Finotto	Cosworth DFV	F	Carlo Facetti													DNQ			**35**^{1}	5th
1974	Scuderia Finotto	Cosworth DFV	F	Helmut Koinigg												DNQ				**35**^{1}	5th
1974	Scuderia Finotto	Cosworth DFV	F	Gérard Larrousse					Ret				DNQ							**35**^{1}	5th
1974	Motor Racing Developments Ltd.	Cosworth DFV	G	Teddy Pilette					17											**35**^{1}	5th
1974	The Chequered Flag	Cosworth DFV	G	Ian Ashley														DNQ	DNQ	**35**^{1}	5th
1974	Team Canada F1 Racing	Cosworth DFV	G	Eppie Wietzes														Ret		**35**^{1}	5th
1974	Allied Polymer Group	Cosworth DFV	G	Lella Lombardi										DNQ						**35**^{1}	5th

^1 Total points scored by all Brabham cars.
