= Scuderia Finotto =

- Full name: (Italy) Scuderia Finotto
- Base: Italy
- Founder(s): (Switzerland) Jürg Dubler
- Noted staff: Martino Finotto, John Anderson, John Leslie
- Noted drivers: (France) Gérard Larrousse (Austria) Helmut Koinigg (Italy) Carlo Facetti

Formula One World Championship career
- First entry: 1974 Belgian Grand Prix
- Races entered: 4
- Constructors: Brabham
- Engines: Cosworth DFV
- Drivers' Championships: 0
- Race victories: 0
- Pole positions: 0
- Fastest laps: 0
- Final entry: 1974 Italian Grand Prix

Scuderia Finotto was a Swiss-Italian motor racing team founded by former Formula three driver Jürg Dubler. It raced in Formula One during the 1974 season, using customer Brabham cars.

== Formula One ==
Following the withdrawal of the Silvio Moser Racing Team from Formula One, Italian touring car driver Martino Finotto bought two Brabham BT42s from Silvio Moser. Initially interested in the idea of racing the cars himself, Finotto eventually decided to lease them to Jürg Dubler with the idea of creating a Formula One team. With the financial backing of Jürg Bretscher and Antonino Nicodemi, Dubler entered both cars for the 1974 Spanish Grand Prix, one for Moser and the other for the Swede Reine Wisell. Tragically, one week before the race, Moser was seriously injured while driving a Lola T294-BMW at the 6 Hours of Monza sports car race and died one month later. The experience had a profund demoralizing effect on the team and its backers. Having lost the support of Bretscher and Nicodemi, the team ended up being headquartered in Aquilino Branca's workshop in Buscate, near Milan, with only one full-time mechanic, New Zealander John Anderson, and an engine builder, Englishman John Leslie. Unsatisfied with the original engine, Novamotor's Dyno, Dubler purchased one new Cosworth DFV but this broke down during testing before the French GP. The other two engines supplied by Brabham with the cars were old small port engines that turned out to be unreliable and not particularly powerful.

As Wisell had baled out, Gérard Larrousse drove for the team in their debut race in Belgium. He qualified 28th and retired after 53 laps because of tyre problems. Larrousse unsuccessfully tried to qualify the car again in the France Grand Prix. Helmut Koinigg drove for the team in Austria and failed to qualify as well. The last outing for Scuderia Finotto came in Italy when Carlo Facetti failed to qualify one more time. Cees Siewertsen tested for the team at the Casale Corte Cerro circuit in Milan with the possibility of participation at the Dutch GP. Manfred Mohr, Andy Sutcliffe and Jean-Louis Lafosse were also contacted with the perspective of taking part to the German and British Grand Prix, but the team was no longer in a financial position to race. Following the unsuccessful 1974 campaign, Scuderia Finotto withdrew from Formula One. Maurizio Finotto returned to European Touring Car Championship, while Dubler retired from professional motorsport.

== Complete Formula One World Championship results ==
(key) (Results in bold indicate pole position; results in italics indicate fastest lap.)

Year	Chassis	Engine	Tyres	Drivers	1	2	3	4	5	6	7	8	9	10	11	12	13	14	15
1974	Brabham BT42	Ford Cosworth DFV 3.0 V8	**F**		ARG	BRA	RSA	ESP	BEL	MON	SWE	NED	FRA	GBR	GER	AUT	ITA	CAN	USA
1974	Brabham BT42	Ford Cosworth DFV 3.0 V8	**F**	(France) Gérard Larrousse					Ret				DNQ						
1974	Brabham BT42	Ford Cosworth DFV 3.0 V8	**F**	(Austria) Helmut Koinigg												DNQ			
1974	Brabham BT42	Ford Cosworth DFV 3.0 V8	**F**	(Italy) Carlo Facetti													DNQ		
