= José Dolhem =

French racing driver (1944–1988)

- Born: Louis José Lucien Dolhem; 26 April 1944; Paris, France
- Died: 16 April 1988 (aged 43); Saint-Just-Saint-Rambert, Loire, France

Formula One World Championship career
- Nationality: (France) French
- Active years: 1974
- Team: Surtees
- Entries: 3 (1 start)
- Championships: 0
- Wins: 0
- Podiums: 0
- Career points: 0
- Pole positions: 0
- Fastest laps: 0
- First entry: 1974 French Grand Prix
- Last entry: 1974 United States Grand Prix

Louis José Lucien Dolhem (26 April 1944 – 16 April 1988) was a racing driver from France, and the half brother (and also first cousin) of Formula One driver Didier Pironi (they had the same father and their mothers were sisters).

Dolhem was born in Paris. He participated in three Formula One Grands Prix, debuting on 7 July 1974, and scoring no championship points. His single grand prix start came to end when he was withdrawn by his team after his team-mate Helmut Koinigg's fatal accident during the season-ending US Grand Prix.

Dolhem died in a plane crash at Saint-Just-Saint-Rambert near Saint-Etienne in 1988. He was buried alongside Pironi, who died while offshore powerboat racing eight months earlier, in Grimaud, near St Tropez in southern France.

== Racing record ==
=== Complete European Formula Two Championship results ===
(key) (Races in bold indicate pole position; races in italics indicate fastest lap)

Year	Entrant	Chassis	Engine	1	2	3	4	5	6	7	8	9	10	11	12	13	14	15	16	17	Pos.	Pts
1971	Siffert Racing Team	Chevron B18	Ford	HOC	THR	NÜR	JAR	PAL	ROU	MAN	TUL	ALB	VAL	VAL; 14							NC	0
1972	Shell-Arnold Team	March 722	Ford	MAL	THR	HOC	PAU	PAL; DNQ	HOC; Ret	ROU; 8	ÖST; 10	IMO; DNQ	MAN; Ret	PER; Ret	SAL; 11		HOC; 12				27th	2
1972	Team Surtees	Surtees TS10	Ford													ALB; DNS					27th	2
1973	Team Surtees	Surtees TS15	Ford	MAL	HOC	THR	NÜR	PAU	KIN	NIV	HOC	ROU; DNS	MNZ	MAN	KAR	PER	SAL	NOR	ALB; 13	VAL	NC	0
1974	Bang & Olufsen Team Surtees	Surtees TS15	Ford	BAR	HOC	PAU; Ret	SAL; 3	HOC; 9	MUG; Ret	KAR	PER; Ret	HOC	VAL								14th	4
1976	Fred Opert Racing	Chevron B35	Hart	HOC; Ret	THR; 17	VAL; Ret	SAL; 9	PAU; Ret	HOC; Ret	ROU; 9	MUG	PER	EST	NOG; 16	HOC						NC	0
1977	Willi Kauhsen Racing Team	Elf 2J	Renault	SIL	THR	HOC	NÜR	VAL	PAU	MUG	ROU; Ret	NOG	PER	MIS	EST	DON					NC	0
1978	Sol-Amor GPA Motul	AGS JH15	BMW	THR	HOC	NÜR	PAU; Ret	MUG; Ret	VAL	ROU; DNQ	DON	NOG	PER	MIS	HOC						NC	0
1979	Ecurie Motul Nogaro	AGS JH16	BMW	SIL; 14	HOC	THR	NÜR	VAL	MUG	PAU	HOC	ZAN	PER	MIS	DON						NC	0

=== 24 Hours of Le Mans results ===
Year	Team	Co-Drivers	Car	Class	Laps	Pos.	Class Pos.
1973	(France) Automobiles Charles Pozzi	(France) Alain Serpaggi	Ferrari 365 GTB/4	GT; 5.0	315	9th	**2nd**
1974	(France) Équipe Gitanes	(France) Jean-Pierre Jaussaud (France) Bob Wollek	Matra-Simca MS670B	S 3.0	120	DNF	DNF
1976	(France) Renault Sport	(France) Jean-Pierre Jabouille (France) Patrick Tambay	Renault Alpine A442	S 3.0	135	DNF	DNF
1978	(France) Equipe Renault Elf Sport Calberson	(France) Guy Fréquelin (France) Jean Ragnotti (France) Jean-Pierre Jabouille	Renault Alpine A442A	S +2.0	358	4th	4th

=== Complete Formula One results ===
(key)

Year	Entrant	Chassis	Engine	1	2	3	4	5	6	7	8	9	10	11	12	13	14	15	WDC	Pts
1974	Team Surtees	Surtees TS16	Ford Cosworth DFV 3.0 V8	ARG	BRA	RSA	ESP	BEL	MON	SWE	NED	FRA; DNQ	GBR	GER	AUT	ITA; DNQ	CAN	USA; Ret	NC	0
