= Eppie Wietzes =

Canadian racing driver (1938–2020)

- Born: 28 May 1938; Assen, Netherlands
- Died: 10 June 2020 (aged 82); Ontario, Canada

Formula One World Championship career
- Nationality: (Canada) Canadian
- Active years: 1967, 1974
- Team(s): Lotus, non-works Brabham
- Entries: 2
- Championships: 0
- Wins: 0
- Podiums: 0
- Career points: 0
- Pole positions: 0
- Fastest laps: 0
- First entry: 1967 Canadian Grand Prix
- Last entry: 1974 Canadian Grand Prix

Egbert "Eppie" Wietzes (28 May 1938 – 10 June 2020) was a racing driver from Canada.

== Formula One ==
Wietzes was born in Assen, Netherlands in 1938, and emigrated with his family to Canada when he was 12 years old. He participated in two Formula One World Championship Grands Prix, debuting on 27 August 1967 in the inaugural Canadian Grand Prix at Mosport. He retired on lap 69 with wet electrics and was subsequently disqualified for receiving outside assistance. Wietzes also participated in the 1974 Canadian Grand Prix with a rented Brabham BT42 but again retired with a transmission problem. He scored no championship points. Wietzes later experienced success in the F5000 class and won the 1981 Trans-Am Series. In 1993, he was inducted into the Canadian Motorsport Hall of Fame.

== Safety car ==
Wietzes was the driver of the first safety car in Formula One, in the 1973 Canadian Grand Prix, taking a Porsche 914 course car on to the track after a collision involving François Cevert and Jody Scheckter.

== Complete Formula One World Championship results ==
(key)

Year	Entrant	Chassis	Engine	1	2	3	4	5	6	7	8	9	10	11	12	13	14	15	WDC	Points
1967	Team Lotus / Comstock Racing	Lotus 49	Cosworth V8	RSA	MON	NED	BEL	FRA	GBR	GER	CAN; DSQ	ITA	USA	MEX					NC	0
1974	Team Canada F1 Racing	Brabham BT42	Cosworth V8	ARG	BRA	RSA	ESP	BEL	MON	SWE	NED	FRA	GBR	GER	AUT	ITA	CAN; Ret	USA	NC	0
