= Finotto =

Finotto may refer to:

- Martino Finotto (1933-2014), Italian racing driver
- Mattia Finotto (born 1992), Italian football player in the role of forward
- Scuderia Finotto, an Italian motor racing team from Italy, founded by Jurg Dubler
