= Mike Wilds =

British racing driver (born 1946)

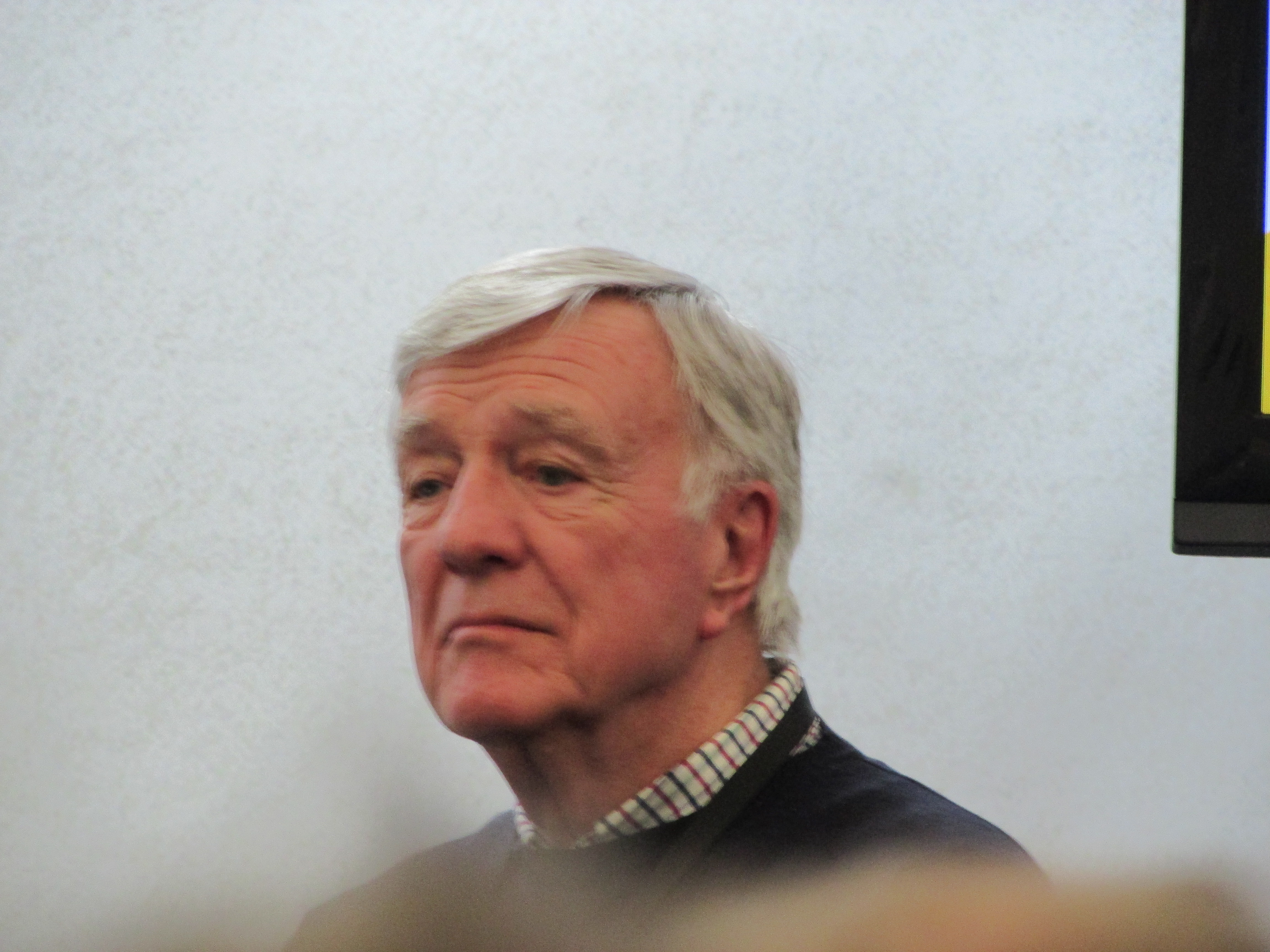
- Wilds in 2023
- Born: William Michael Wilds; 7 January 1946 (age 80); Chiswick, Middlesex, England

Formula One World Championship career
- Nationality: (United Kingdom) British
- Active years: 1974 – 1976
- Team(s): Ensign, BRM, non-works March non-works Shadow
- Entries: 8 (3 starts)
- Championships: 0
- Wins: 0
- Podiums: 0
- Career points: 0
- Pole positions: 0
- Fastest laps: 0
- First entry: 1974 British Grand Prix
- Last entry: 1976 British Grand Prix

William Michael Wilds (born 7 January 1946) is a British racing driver from England. He participated in eight Formula One World Championship Grands Prix, debuting on 20 July 1974. He scored no championship points.

== Career ==
After winning a few races in Formula 3 in the early 1970s, Wilds moved on to Formula 5000. At the same time, he took part in a few Formula One Grands Prix, firstly with a non-works March, then with Ensign and BRM. After he failed to qualify at his home Grand Prix in 1976, with a privately run Shadow, he concentrated on other forms of motor sport, including sports car racing and historic racing.

In an interview with Wilds, published on YouTube, he described one of the highlights of his short-lived Formula One career, at the 1974 United States Grand Prix after qualifying, Tyrrell founder Ken Tyrrell walked up to him, telling Wilds that Jody Scheckter wanted to speak to him. Wilds had gone out in qualifying just ahead of Jody, assuming he was going too slow for the Tyrrell. Upon approaching Scheckter, Wilds thought he would be told he was slow. When the South African driver approached him, Wilds raised his voice to him, thinking he would be complained at. After this, Scheckter complemented Wilds' control and handling of the old Ensign N174.

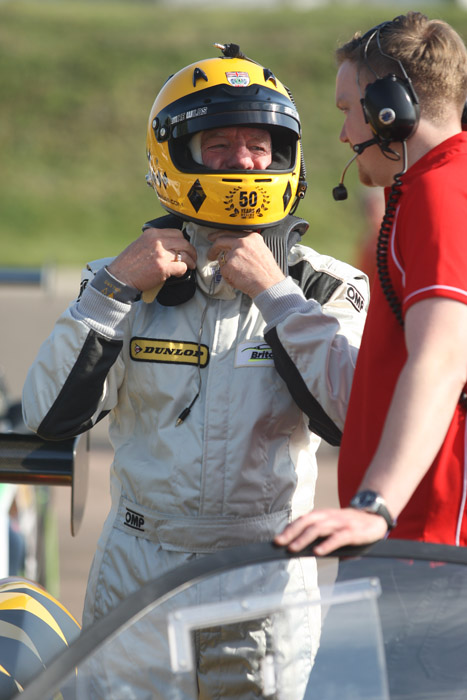
Wilds at Snetterton, May 2016.

Wilds won the Formula Two class in the 1978 Aurora AFX championship, driving a Ralt and finished ninth in the overall standings. He also won the Thoroughbred Sports Cars championship in 1984 driving an Aston Martin DB4.

Wilds won the RJB Mining Historic Sports Car Championship in 1992, '93, '96 and 98.

Wilds' sports car racing career included driving at Le Mans eight times, including C2 cars for Ecurie Ecosse (World Champion C2, 1986), and Group C for Nissan in 1988 with team-mate Win Percy.

Wilds won the 2008 Britcar Drivers Championship together with Ian Lawson and Mike's son Anthony Wilds in the ING Sport BMW; the team also went on to win again in 2013 and also won the 2008 Group C Enduro Trophy in the Porsche 962 with Henry Pearman.

Wilds still occasionally drives in events for historic cars. He raced a Porsche 962 and an Elva Mk5 in the 2008 Silverstone Classic. He returned to the Britcar Endurance grid in May 2016 posting his first win as a shared drive with son Anthony in a Ferrari 458.

In 2018, at the age of 72, Wilds competed in the final round of the Porsche Carrera Cup Great Britain series with Redline Racing at Brands Hatch.

In addition to his car racing career, Wilds is an active commercial helicopter pilot and instructor. He is affectionately known as 'The Honorific' Mike Wilds.

== Racing record ==
=== Complete British Formula One Championship results ===
(key) (Races in bold indicate pole position; races in italics indicate fastest lap.)

Year	Entrant	Chassis	Engine	1	2	3	4	5	6	7	8	9	10	11	12	13	14	15	16	17	18	Pos.	Pts
1974	Dempster International Racing Team	March 74A	Chevrolet 5.0 V8	BRH; 2	MAL; 2	SIL; 6	OUL; Ret	**BRH**; 6	ZOL; 4	THR; 13	ZAN	MUG	MNZ; Ret	MAL; 11	MON	THR	BRH; 6	OUL	SNE	MAL	BRH	11th	58
1975	Mick Hill	March 74A	Chevrolet 5.0 V8	BRH	OUL	BRH	SIL	ZOL	ZAN	THR	SNE	MAL	THR	BRH	OUL	SIL	SNE	MAL; 7	BRH; 7			23rd	12
1976	Team PR Reilly	Shadow DN3B	Ford Cosworth DFV 3.0 V8	MAL	SNE	OUL	BRH	THR; 3	BRH; 4	MAL; Ret	SNE; 2					BRH; 6						5th	51
1976	Team PR Reilly	Ensign N174	Ford Cosworth DFV 3.0 V8									BRH; 19	THR; 5	OUL	BRH							5th	51
1977	AIM Racing	Chevron B30	Ford GAA 3.4 V6	MAL	SNE	OUL	BRH	MAL	THR	BRH	OUL	MAL	DON	BRH; DNS	THR	SNE; NC	BRH; 7					29th	4
1978	Graham Eden Racing	Ralt RT1	Ford BDG 2.0 L4	OUL; Ret	BRH; 6	SNE; Ret	MAL; 7	ZAN; 6	DON; DNS	THR; 6	OUL; 6	MAL; 8	BRH; 7	THR; 13	SNE; 5							9th	43
1979	Pontin Racing	March 772P/782	Ford BDG Eden 2.0 L4	ZOL	OUL	BRH	MAL	SNE	THR	ZAN	DON	OUL	NOG	MAL	BRH	THR; 12	SNE	SIL				NC	0
1980	Graham Eden Racing	Chevron B41	Ford Cosworth DFV 3.0 V8	OUL	BRH	SIL	MAL	THR	MNZ	MAL	SNE	BRH	THR	OUL	SIL; 4							14th	3

=== Complete Formula One World Championship results ===
(key)

Year	Entrant	Chassis	Engine	1	2	3	4	5	6	7	8	9	10	11	12	13	14	15	16	WDC	Pts
1974	Dempster International Racing Team	March 731	Ford Cosworth DFV 3.0 V8	ARG	BRA	RSA	ESP	BEL	MON	SWE	NED	FRA	GBR; DNQ	GER						NC	0
1974	Team Ensign	Ensign N174	Ford Cosworth DFV 3.0 V8												AUT; DNQ	ITA; DNQ	CAN; DNQ	USA; NC		NC	0
1975	Stanley BRM	BRM P201	BRM P200 3.0 V12	ARG; Ret	BRA; Ret	RSA	ESP	MON	BEL	SWE	NED	FRA	GBR	GER	AUT	ITA	USA			NC	0
1976	Team PR Reilly	Shadow DN3B	Ford Cosworth DFV 3.0 V8	BRA	RSA	USW	ESP	BEL	MON	SWE	FRA	GBR; DNQ	GER	AUT	NED	ITA	CAN	USA	JPN	NC	0

=== Complete British Saloon / Touring Car Championship results ===
(key) (Races in bold indicate pole position; races in italics indicate fastest lap.)

Year	Team	Car	Class	1	2	3	4	5	6	7	8	9	10	11	12	13	Pos.	Pts	Class
1977	Linden Finance	Triumph Dolomite Sprint	C	SIL; Ret	BRH ovr:6 cls:4	OUL	THR	SIL	THR	DON	SIL	DON	BRH	THR	BRH		31st	1	9th
1978	Hughes of Beaconsfield	Toyota Celica GT	B	SIL	OUL	THR	BRH	SIL	DON	MAL	BRH ovr:? cls:3	DON ovr:4† cls:3†	BRH	THR ovr:? cls:3	OUL		27th	12	6th
1989	Trakstar Motorsport	Ford Sierra RS500	A	OUL	SIL	THR	DON; Ret‡	THR	SIL	SIL	BRH	SNE	BRH	BIR	DON	SIL	NC	0	NC

† Events with 2 races staged for the different classes.

‡ Endurance driver.

=== Complete European Touring Car Championship results ===
(key) (Races in bold indicate pole position) (Races in italics indicate fastest lap)

Year	Team	Car	1	2	3	4	5	6	7	8	9	10	11	12	DC	Points
1980	Dealer Team Renault	Renault 5 Gordini	MNZ	VAL	BRH	SAL	BRN	PER	NUR	SIL; Ret	ZOL				NC	0
1984	Jolly Club Milano	Alfa Romeo Alfetta GTV6	MNZ	VAL	DON	PER	BRN	ZEL	SAL	NUR	SPA	SIL; Ret	ZOL	MUG	NC	0

=== Complete World Sports-Prototype Championship results ===
(key) (Races in bold indicate pole position) (Races in italics indicate fastest lap)

Year	Entrant	Class	Chassis	Engine	1	2	3	4	5	6	7	8	9	10	11	12	13	14	15	Pos.	Pts
1980	Malaya Garage Ltd.	Gr.5	Porsche 911SC	Porsche 2.8 F6	DAY	BRH	MUG	MNZ	SIL; Ret	NÜR	LMS	GLN	MOS	VAL	DIJ					(Note: No drivers' Championship.)	
1981	Tuff Kote Dinol Racing	Gr.5	Porsche 935-L1	Porsche 1.4 F6t	DAY	SEB	MUG	MNZ	RSD	SIL; Ret	NÜR	LMS; Ret	PER	DAY	GLN	SPA	MOS	ROA	BRH	NC	0
1982	Dorset Racing Associates	C	De Cadenet-Lola LM	Ford Cosworth DFV 3.0 V8	MNZ	SIL; NC	NÜR	LMS; Ret	SPA	MUG	FUJ	BRH								NC	0
1983	François Duret	C	De Cadenet-Lola LM	Ford Cosworth DFV 3.0 V8	MNZ	SIL; 12	NÜR	LMS	SPA	FUJ	KYA									NC	0
1984	Ecurie Ecosse	C2	Ecosse C284	Ford Cosworth DFV 3.0 V8	MNZ; 10	SIL; Ret	LMS; Ret	NÜR	BRH	MOS	SPA	IMO	FUJ	KYA	SAN					77th	3
1985	Ecurie Ecosse	C2	Ecosse C285	Ford Cosworth DFV 3.0 V8	MUG	MNZ; 10	SIL; 9	LMS; Ret	HOC; 8	MOS	SPA; 14									22nd	20
1985	Ecurie Ecosse	C2	Ecosse C285	Cosworth DFL 3.3 V8								BRH; 6	FUJ	SHA						22nd	20
1986	Ecurie Ecosse	C2	Ecosse C286	Rover V64V 3.0 V6	MNZ	SIL; Ret	LMS; DSQ	NOR	BRH	JER	NÜR	SPA	FUJ							NC	0
1987	ADA Engineering	C2	Gebhardt 843	Cosworth DFL 3.3 V8	JAR; 13	JER; Ret	MNZ													37th	8
1987	Ecurie Ecosse	C2	Ecosse C286	Cosworth DFL 3.3 V8				SIL; 8	LMS; Ret	NOR; Ret	BRH; 10	NÜR; 11	SPA; 12	FUJ; 15						37th	8
1988	Nissan Motorsports	C1	Nissan R88C	Nissan VRH30 3.0 V8t	JER	JAR	MNZ	SIL	LMS; 14	BRN	BRH	NÜR	SPA	FUJ	SAN					NC	0

Footnotes

=== Complete 24 Hours of Le Mans results ===
Year	Team	Co-Drivers	Car	Class	Laps	Pos.	Class Pos.
1981	(Sweden) Tuff Kote Dinol Racing	(Sweden) Jan Lundgårdh (Germany) Axel Plankenhorn	Porsche 935-L1	Gr.5	49	DNF	DNF
1982	(United Kingdom) Dorset Racing Associates	(France) François Duret (United Kingdom) Ian Harrower	De Cadenet-Lola LM-Ford Cosworth	C	56	DNF	DNF
1984	(United Kingdom) Ecurie Ecosse	(United Kingdom) David Leslie (United Kingdom) David Duffield	Ecosse C284-Ford Cosworth	C2	36	DNF	DNF
1985	(United Kingdom) Ecurie Ecosse	(United Kingdom) Ray Mallock (United Kingdom) David Leslie	Ecosse C285-Ford Cosworth	C2	45	DNF	DNF
1986	(United Kingdom) Ecurie Ecosse	(United Kingdom) Ray Mallock (United Kingdom) David Leslie	Ecosse C286-Austin-Rover	C2	181	DSQ	DSQ
1987	(United Kingdom) Ecurie Ecosse	(United States) Les Delano (United States) Andy Petery	Ecosse C286-Ford Cosworth	C2	135	DNF	DNF
1988	(Japan) Nissan Motorsports	(Australia) Allan Grice (United Kingdom) Win Percy	Nissan R88C	C1	344	14th	13th

=== 24 Hours of Silverstone results ===
Year	Team	Co-Drivers	Car	Car No.	Class	Laps	Pos.	Class Pos.
2010	(United Kingdom) Mazda Motors UK Ltd	(United Kingdom) Mark Ticehurst (United Kingdom) Owen Mildenhall (United Kingdom) Jamie Corstorphine (United Kingdom) Ollie Marriage (DNS)	Mazda MX5	86	4	340	51st/DNF	20th/DNF
2010	(United Kingdom) Mazda Motors UK Ltd	(United Kingdom) Ben Whitworth (United States) Jim McGill (United Kingdom) Matt Joy (United Kingdom) Jade Paveley (United Kingdom) Ollie Marriage	Mazda MX5	87	4	474	34th	11th
2011	(United Kingdom) Mazda Motors UK Ltd	(United Kingdom) Mark Ticehurst (United Kingdom) Owen Mildenhall	Mazda MX5	45	3	92	NC	NC

=== Complete British GT Championship results ===
(key) (Races in bold indicate pole position) (Races in italics indicate fastest lap)

Year	Team	Car	Class	1	2	3	4	5	6	7	8	9	10	11	12	Pos	Points
2000	CSi Brookspeed Racing	Chrysler Viper GTS-R	GT	THR; 1	CRO; 1	OUL; 1	DON; 1	SIL; 1	BRH; 1	DON; 1	CRO; 1	SIL; 1; 3	SNE; 1	SPA; 1	SIL; 1	32nd	10

=== Complete Britcar results ===
(key) (Races in bold indicate pole position in class – 1 point awarded just in first race) (Races in italics indicate fastest lap in class – 1 point awarded all races)

Year	Team	Car	Class	1	2	3	4	5	6	7	8	9	10	11	12	13	14	15	DC	CP	Points
2016	FF Corse	Ferrari 458 Challenge	2	SIL	SNE; 1	DON; 3	**THR**; 3	CRO	SIL; 2	OUL	BRH								8th	1st	85
2017	DMS & FF Corse	Ferrari 458 Challenge	E2	**SIL**; **1**; 1	SIL; 2; 4	SNE; 1 Ret	SNE; 2 Ret	SIL; 1	SIL; 2	BRH; 1	BRH; 2	DON; 1	DON; 2	OUL; 1	OUL; 2	SIL	BRH; 1	BRH; 2	16th	3rd	76
