= 1977 European Touring Car Championship =

Seasons
- ← 1976 1978 →

The 1977 European Touring Car Championship was the 15th season of the European Touring Car Championship. The championship was run to all five Production Car categories of FIA's Appendix J, from Group 1 up to and including Group 5. Dieter Quester was the overall winner at the wheel of a BMW 3.0 CSL; BMW won Group 5, Group 3, and the lightly contested Group 4 as well. European Touring Car racing was in its best form since before the 1973 oil crisis, with some new teams including Jaguar (fielding a factory effort), an official return of Alpina, and mostly full starting grids.

== Results ==
=== Drivers ===
Position	Driver	Team	Car	Class	Points
1	(Germany) Dieter Quester	BMW/Alpina	BMW 3.0 CSL	Group 5	125
2	(Italy) Carlo Facetti	Autovama Firenze; Luigi Racing UFO	Alfa Romeo GTAm 2.0; BMW 3.0 CSL	Group 3 Group 5	119
3	(Belgium) Jean Xhenceval	Luigi Racing UFO	BMW 3.0 CSL	Group 5	119
3	(Belgium) Pierre Dieudonné	Luigi Racing UFO	BMW 3.0 CSL	Group 5	119
5	(Italy) Martino Finotto	Luigi Racing UFO/Jolly Club - UFO	BMW 3.0 CSL	Group 5	107
6	(Belgium) Eddy Joosen	Luigi Racing UFO	BMW 3.0 CSL	Group 5	82
7	(Italy) Umberto Grano	Luigi Racing UFO	BMW 3.0 CSL	Group 5	80
8	(Switzerland) Jörg Siegrist	Spiess	Volkswagen Scirocco	Group 2	66
8	(Switzerland) Anton Stocker	Spiess	Volkswagen Scirocco	Group 2	66
10	(Belgium) Claude De Wael	Luigi Racing UFO	BMW 3.0 CSL	Group 5	45
11	(Sweden) Gunnar Nilsson	BMW-Alpina	BMW 3.0 CSL	Group 5	40
12	(Germany) Willi Bergmeister	Spiess/Jägermeister Racing Team	Volkswagen Scirocco	Group 2	38

=== Race results ===
Date	Round	Circuit	Winning drivers	Winning team	Winning car	Class
27/03	Rd. 1 - Trofeo Mario Angiolini	(Italy) Monza	(Italy) Martino Finotto (Italy) Carlo Facetti (Italy) Umberto Grano	Luigi Racing UFO	BMW 3.0 CSL	Group 5
24/04	Rd. 2 - Austria-Trophée Salzburgring (Preis der Firma Elan)	(Austria) Salzburgring	(Germany) Dieter Quester (Sweden) Gunnar Nilsson	BMW-Alpina	BMW 3.0 CSL	Group 5
08/05	Rd. 3 - Gran Premio Banca Toscana, Mugello	(Italy) Mugello	(Belgium) Jean Xhenceval (Belgium) Pierre Dieudonné	Luigi Racing UFO	BMW 3.0 CSL	Group 5
22/05	Rd. 4 - 500 Chilometri di Pergusa	(Italy) Enna-Pergusa	(Italy) Martino Finotto (Italy) Carlo Facetti	Luigi Racing UFO	BMW 3.0 CSL	Group 5
05/06	Rd. 5 - Grand Prix Brno	(Czechoslovakia) Brno	(Italy) Martino Finotto (Italy) Carlo Facetti	Jolly Club - UFO	BMW 3.0 CSL	Group 5
10/07	Rd. 6 - Grosser Preis der Tourenwagen	(Germany) Nürburgring	(Germany) Dieter Quester (Sweden) Gunnar Nilsson	BMW-Alpina	BMW 3.0 CSL	Group 5
07/08	Rd. 7 - Zandvoort Trophy	(Netherlands) Zandvoort	(Germany) Dieter Quester (Netherlands) Toine Hezemans	BMW-Alpina	BMW 3.0 CSL	Group 5
18/09	Rd. 8 - Access RAC Tourist Trophy	(United Kingdom) Silverstone	(Germany) Dieter Quester (United Kingdom) Tom Walkinshaw	BMW-Alpina	BMW 3.0 CSL	Group 5
25/09	Rd. 9 - EG Trophy	(Netherlands) Zolder	(Germany) Dieter Quester (Belgium) Patrick Nève	BMW-Alpina	BMW 3.0 CSL	Group 5
09/10	Rd. 10 - 4 Horas de Jarama	(Spain) Jarama	(Germany) Eddy Joosen (Italy) Umberto Grano	Luigi Racing UFO	BMW 3.0 CSL	Group 5
16/10	Rd. 11 - Estoril 4 hours	(Portugal) Estoril	(Italy) Martino Finotto (Italy) Carlo Facetti	Luigi Racing UFO	BMW 3.0 CSL	Group 5

=== Manufacturers ===
Group 5			Points per race										
Place	Manufacturer	Total	MON	SAL	MUG	PER	BRN	NÜR	ZAN	SIL	ZOL	JAR	EST
1	(Germany) BMW	160	20	20	20	20	20	20	20	20	(20)	(20)	(20)
2	(United Kingdom) Jaguar	37	-	-	-	-	12	15	-	10	-	-	-
Group 4			Points per race										
Place	Manufacturer	Total	MON	SAL	MUG	PER	BRN	NÜR	ZAN	SIL	ZOL	JAR	EST
1	(Germany) BMW	133	12	15	20	-	20	20	20	6	20	-	-
2	(United Kingdom) Ford	125	20	10	15	20	12	(4)	8	20	-	-	20
3	(Japan) Mazda	58	-	20	-	-	10	6	10	12	-	-	-
4	(Germany) Opel	57	-	-	-	15	-	15	12	-	-	-	15
Group 3			Points per race										
Place	Manufacturer	Total	MON	SAL	MUG	PER	BRN	NÜR	ZAN	SIL	ZOL	JAR	EST
1	(Germany) BMW	150	(10)	15	20	-	20	15	(15)	20	20	20	20
2	(Italy) Alfa Romeo	137	20	20	12	20	15	(10)	20	(10)	-	15	15
3	(United Kingdom) Ford	45	-	12	-	-	-	20	10	3	-	-	-
4	(Spain) Chrysler	15	-	-	-	-	-	-	-	-	-	12	3 (Note: The only Chrysler DNF'd which should have netted it zero points; it was seventh out of seven Group 3 starters which would have netted it four points if classified.)
5	(United Kingdom) Triumph	10	-	-	-	-	10	-	-	-	-	-	-
Group 2			Points per race										
Place	Manufacturer	Total	MON	SAL	MUG	PER	BRN	NÜR	ZAN	SIL	ZOL	JAR	EST
1	(Germany) Volkswagen	160	20	20	20	20	20	20	20	20	(20)	(20)	(20)
2	(Germany) Audi	89	15	12	8	12	15	12	8?	-	15	-	-
3	(Italy) Alfa Romeo	32	10	-	12	10	-	-	-	-	-	-	-
4	(France) Renault	18	-	-	-	-	10	-	-	6	-	-	-
5	(Japan) Mitsubishi (Note: Entered as "Colt")	15	-	-	-	-	-	-	-	15	-	-	-
6	(United Kingdom) Ford	15	-	-	-	-	-	-	15	-	-	-	-
6	(Germany) Opel	4	-	-	-	4	-	-	-	-	-	-	-
6	(Germany) BMW	3	-	-	-	3	-	-	-	-	-	-	-
