= Helmut Koinigg =

Austrian racing driver (1948–1974)

Helmut^{[1]} Koinigg
- Koinigg in Le Mans, 1974
- Born: 3 November 1948; Vienna, Austria
- Died: 6 October 1974 (aged 25); Watkins Glen, New York, U.S.

Formula One World Championship career
- Nationality: (Austria) Austrian
- Active years: 1974
- Team(s): Surtees, non-works Brabham
- Entries: 3 (2 starts)
- Championships: 0
- Wins: 0
- Podiums: 0
- Career points: 0
- Pole positions: 0
- Fastest laps: 0
- First entry: 1974 Austrian Grand Prix
- Last entry: 1974 United States Grand Prix

Helmut Koinigg (3 November 1948 – 6 October 1974) was an Austrian racing driver who died in a crash in the 1974 United States Grand Prix, in his second Grand Prix start.

== Racing career ==
Koinigg was born in Vienna. Like several other Formula One drivers, Koinigg's first racing car was a Mini Cooper, which he had purchased from Niki Lauda. He raced in touring cars, Formula Vee and Formula Ford before a period in sports car racing. He subsequently found the finance to buy a seat with Scuderia Finotto driving their Brabham at his home Grand Prix in 1974, and although he failed to qualify, this led to a contract with Surtees for the last two races of the season.

After a good showing at the 1974 Canadian Grand Prix, Koinigg was beginning to establish himself as a good prospect for 1975. But running near the back in the US Grand Prix at Watkins Glen, Koinigg's car suffered a suspension failure at turn 7, pitching it head-on into the Armco barrier. The speed at which Koinigg crashed was relatively low, and he was likely to have escaped the accident uninjured. However, as with a number of other circuits at that time, the Armco was insecurely installed and the bottom portion of it buckled as the vehicle struck it. The car passed underneath the top portion, which remained intact. Koinigg was decapitated on impact. He was 25 years old. Koinigg's accident was reminiscent of the death of Formula One driver François Cevert, whose torso was severed upon impacting the barrier on the other side of the circuit in turns 2–4 the previous year.

== Complete Formula One results ==
(key)

Year	Entrant	Chassis	Engine	1	2	3	4	5	6	7	8	9	10	11	12	13	14	15	WDC	Points
1974	Scuderia Finotto	Brabham BT42	Cosworth V8	ARG	BRA	RSA	ESP	BEL	MON	SWE	NED	FRA	GBR	GER	AUT; DNQ	ITA			NC	0
1974	Team Surtees	Surtees TS16	Cosworth V8														CAN; 10	USA; Ret	NC	0

== 24 Hours of Le Mans results ==
Year	Team	Co-drivers	Car	Class	Laps	Pos.	Class pos.
1973	(Germany) Ford Motorenwerke Deutschland	(United Kingdom) Gerry Birrell (France) Jean Vinatier	Ford Capri LV	TS 3.0	152	DNF	DNF
1974	(Germany) Martini Racing Porsche System	(Liechtenstein) Manfred Schurti	Porsche 911 Carrera RSR Turbo	S 3.0	87	DNF	DNF

== Notes ==
1. Sources including oldracingcars.com and grandprix.com spell this person's first name as "Helmut", other sources including formula1.com, driverdb.com and motorsportmagazine.com spell it as "Helmuth".

Preceded by Peter Revson	Formula One fatal accidents 6 October 1974	Succeeded by Mark Donohue
