= 1974 Canadian Grand Prix =

Race details
- Date: September 22, 1974
- Location: Mosport Park, Bowmanville, Ontario, Canada
- Course: Permanent racing facility
- Course length: 3.957 km (2.459 miles)
- Distance: 80 laps, 316.56 km (196.72 miles)
- Weather: Cold with temperatures approaching 13.3 °C (55.9 °F); wind speeds up to 15 kilometres per hour (9.3 mph)

Pole position
Driver	(Brazil) Emerson Fittipaldi	McLaren-Ford
- Time: 1:13.188

Fastest lap
Driver	(Austria) Niki Lauda	Ferrari
- Time: 1:13.659 on lap 60

Podium
First	(Brazil) Emerson Fittipaldi	McLaren-Ford
Second	(Switzerland) Clay Regazzoni	Ferrari
Third	(Sweden) Ronnie Peterson	Lotus-Ford

The 1974 Canadian Grand Prix was a Formula One motor race held at Mosport Park on 22 September 1974. It was race 14 of 15 in both the 1974 World Championship of Drivers and the 1974 International Cup for Formula One Manufacturers.

Niki Lauda was on course for victory, until running over debris on lap 67, causing his Ferrari to spin into barriers, having led the whole race until that point. He also set the fastest lap of the race. Jacques Laffite was also forced out due to picking up a puncture, possibly caused by the same debris on the circuit. Emerson Fittipaldi grabbed the advantage, and led for the rest of the race. It was his 12th career victory, and the last of the season for the McLaren driver. This was the first Grand Prix race for young Austrian Helmut Koinigg, who would lose his life during the next race at Watkins Glen.

== Classification ==
=== Qualifying ===
Pos	No	Driver	Constructor	Time	Gap
1	5	(Brazil) Emerson Fittipaldi	McLaren-Ford	1:13.188	—
2	12	(Austria) Niki Lauda	Ferrari	1:13.230	+0.042
3	3	(South Africa) Jody Scheckter	Tyrrell-Ford	1:13.302	+0.114
4	7	(Argentina) Carlos Reutemann	Brabham-Ford	1:13.482	+0.294
5	17	(France) Jean-Pierre Jarier	Shadow-Ford	1:13.538	+0.350
6	11	(Switzerland) Clay Regazzoni	Ferrari	1:13.553	+0.365
7	4	(France) Patrick Depailler	Tyrrell-Ford	1:13.634	+0.446
8	24	(United Kingdom) James Hunt	Hesketh-Ford	1:13.736	+0.548
9	8	(Brazil) Carlos Pace	Brabham-Ford	1:14.100	+0.912
10	1	(Sweden) Ronnie Peterson	Lotus-Ford	1:14.340	+1.152
11	27	(West Germany) Rolf Stommelen	Lola-Ford	1:14.449	+1.261
12	33	(West Germany) Jochen Mass	McLaren-Ford	1:14.486	+1.261
13	16	(United Kingdom) Tom Pryce	Shadow-Ford	1:14.631	+1.261
14	6	(New Zealand) Denny Hulme	McLaren-Ford	1:14.754	+1.566
15	28	(United Kingdom) John Watson	Brabham-Ford	1:14.757	+1.569
16	55	(United States) Mario Andretti	Parnelli-Ford	1:14.923	+1.735
17	14	(France) Jean-Pierre Beltoise	BRM	1:15.021	+1.833
18	21	(France) Jacques Laffite	Iso-Marlboro-Ford	1:15.218	+2.030
19	20	(Italy) Arturo Merzario	Iso-Marlboro-Ford	1:15.337	+2.149
20	26	(United Kingdom) Graham Hill	Lola-Ford	1:15.538	+2.350
21	2	(Belgium) Jacky Ickx	Lotus-Ford	1:15.661	+2.473
22	19	(Austria) Helmut Koinigg	Surtees-Ford	1:15.668	+2.480
23	9	(West Germany) Hans Joachim Stuck	March-Ford	1:15.709	+2.521
24	66	(United States) Mark Donohue	Penske-Ford	1:15.741	+2.553
25	15	(New Zealand) Chris Amon	BRM	1:15.815	+2.627
26	50	(Canada) Eppie Wietzes	Brabham-Ford	1:16.311	+3.123
27	18	(United Kingdom) Derek Bell	Surtees-Ford	1:16.600	+3.412
28	22	(United Kingdom) Mike Wilds	Ensign-Ford	1:16.822	+3.634
29	10	(Italy) Vittorio Brambilla	March-Ford	1:17.216	+4.028
30	42	(United Kingdom) Ian Ashley	Brabham-Ford	1:17.305	+4.117

*Positions with a pink background indicate drivers that failed to qualify

=== Race ===
Pos	No	Driver	Constructor	Laps	Time/Retired	Grid	Points
1	5	(Brazil) Emerson Fittipaldi	McLaren-Ford	80	1:40:26.136	1	9
2	11	(Switzerland) Clay Regazzoni	Ferrari	80	+ 13.034	6	6
3	1	(Sweden) Ronnie Peterson	Lotus-Ford	80	+ 14.494	10	4
4	24	(United Kingdom) James Hunt	Hesketh-Ford	80	+ 15.669	8	3
5	4	(France) Patrick Depailler	Tyrrell-Ford	80	+ 55.322	7	2
6	6	(New Zealand) Denny Hulme	McLaren-Ford	79	+ 1 lap	14	1
7	55	(United States) Mario Andretti	Parnelli-Ford	79	+ 1 lap	16	
8	8	(Brazil) Carlos Pace	Brabham-Ford	79	+ 1 lap	9	
9	7	(Argentina) Carlos Reutemann	Brabham-Ford	79	+ 1 lap	4	
10	19	(Austria) Helmut Koinigg	Surtees-Ford	78	+ 2 laps	22	
11	27	(West Germany) Rolf Stommelen	Lola-Ford	78	+ 2 laps	11	
12	66	(United States) Mark Donohue	Penske-Ford	78	+ 2 laps	24	
13	2	(Belgium) Jacky Ickx	Lotus-Ford	78	+ 2 laps	21	
14	26	(United Kingdom) Graham Hill	Lola-Ford	77	+ 3 laps	20	
15	21	(France) Jacques Laffite	Iso-Marlboro-Ford	74	Puncture	18	
16	33	(West Germany) Jochen Mass	McLaren-Ford	72	+ 8 laps	12	
NC	15	(New Zealand) Chris Amon	BRM	70	+ 10 laps	25	
Ret	12	(Austria) Niki Lauda	Ferrari	67	Accident	2	
Ret	16	(United Kingdom) Tom Pryce	Shadow-Ford	65	Engine	13	
Ret	28	(United Kingdom) John Watson	Brabham-Ford	61	Suspension	15	
NC	14	(France) Jean-Pierre Beltoise	BRM	60	+ 20 laps	17	
Ret	3	(South Africa) Jody Scheckter	Tyrrell-Ford	48	Brakes	3	
Ret	17	(France) Jean-Pierre Jarier	Shadow-Ford	46	Halfshaft	5	
Ret	20	(Italy) Arturo Merzario	Iso-Marlboro-Ford	40	Handling	19	
Ret	50	(Canada) Eppie Wietzes	Brabham-Ford	33	Engine	26	
Ret	9	(West Germany) Hans Joachim Stuck	March-Ford	12	Fuel system	23	

== Notes ==
- This was the 200th race in which a French driver participated. In those 200 races, French drivers won 4 Grands Prix, achieved 48 podium finishes, 1 pole position, and 10 fastest laps.
- This was the Formula One World Championship debut for American constructors Parnelli and Penske.
- This was the 3rd win of the Canadian Grand Prix for McLaren, breaking the previous record set by Brabham at the 1969 Canadian Grand Prix.

== Championship standings after the race ==
Drivers' Championship standings

	Pos	Driver	Points
2	1	(Brazil) **Emerson Fittipaldi***	52
1	2	(Switzerland) **Clay Regazzoni***	52
1	3	(South Africa) **Jody Scheckter***	45
	4	(Austria) Niki Lauda	38
	5	(Sweden) Ronnie Peterson	35

Constructors' Championship standings

Pos	Constructor	Points
1	(United Kingdom) **McLaren-Ford***	70 (72)
2	(Italy) **Ferrari***	65
3	(United Kingdom) Tyrrell-Ford	51
4	(United Kingdom) Lotus-Ford	42
5	(United Kingdom) Brabham-Ford	26

- Note: Only the top five positions are included for both sets of standings. Only the best 7 results from the first 8 races and the best 6 results from the last 7 races counted towards the Championship. Numbers without parentheses are Championship points; numbers in parentheses are total points scored.
- Competitors in bold and marked with an asterisk still had a theoretical chance of becoming World Champion.

Previous race: 1974 Italian Grand Prix	FIA Formula One World Championship; 1974 season	Next race: 1974 United States Grand Prix
Previous race: 1973 Canadian Grand Prix	Canadian Grand Prix	Next race: 1976 Canadian Grand Prix
