= 1974 United States Grand Prix =

Race details
- Date: October 6, 1974
- Official name: XVII United States Grand Prix
- Location: Watkins Glen Grand Prix Race Course; Watkins Glen, New York
- Course: Permanent road course
- Course length: 5.435 km (3.377 miles)
- Distance: 59 laps, 320.67 km (199.24 miles)
- Weather: Clear, warm

Pole position
| Driver | (Argentina) Carlos Reutemann | Brabham-Ford |
- Time: 1:38.978

Fastest lap
| Driver | (Brazil) Carlos Pace | Brabham-Ford |
- Time: 1:40.608 on lap 54

Podium
| First | (Argentina) Carlos Reutemann | Brabham-Ford |
| Second | (Brazil) Carlos Pace | Brabham-Ford |
| Third | (United Kingdom) James Hunt | Hesketh-Ford |

The 1974 United States Grand Prix was a Formula One motor race held on October 6, 1974, at the Watkins Glen Grand Prix Race Course in Watkins Glen, New York. It was race 15 of 15 in both the 1974 World Championship of Drivers and the 1974 International Cup for Formula One Manufacturers.

Carlos Reutemann won from the pole, ahead of Brabham teammate Carlos Pace, while Emerson Fittipaldi's fourth place clinched his second World Championship in three years and the first for Team McLaren. American Mario Andretti, after qualifying in an excellent third position, was disqualified when the engine in his Parnelli stalled on the grid and his crew push started him.

This was the last race for the 1967 world champion Denny Hulme, who scored 8 wins and 33 podiums in 112 starts. The race also saw the death of Austrian driver Helmut Koinigg, who was driving in only his second Grand Prix.

The weekend was infamous for the burning of a Greyhound bus in an area known as "the bog," which led to the closing of the notorious party area in years to come.

== Race summary ==
Fittipaldi of McLaren and Ferrari's Clay Regazzoni came to the final race of the season even in the Driver's Championship standings with 52 points; Tyrrell's Jody Scheckter, with 45 points, also held an outside chance of overtaking them both. Knowing that tactics could play an important role in the race, McLaren had the two-way radios from their USAC team fitted in the F1 cars at Watkins Glen.

Early in the year, Peter Revson, one of only five American drivers to win a Grand Prix, had died in a testing crash, but the American crowd had countrymen Mario Andretti and Mark Donohue at The Glen to carry the star-spangled banner, and they were both driving American-built cars for American teams.

Andretti gave the home crowd a charge when he was fastest on Friday in the British-designed, California-built Vel's Parnelli Jones car, just two weeks after its Canadian debut. His time of 1:39.209 still had him on the provisional pole halfway through Saturday's session, when a rear brake failure put him off and damaged the nose and steering. By the time Andretti returned to the track, with ten minutes left in the session, Reutemann and James Hunt had pipped him and he would start third.

Donohue, in the second race for the Penske First National City Travelers Checks Special, made less of a splash, as his lack of experience with the car made setup difficult. He and Penske were both pleased, however, with his 14th position in final qualifying.

Scheckter was the top qualifying championship contender, in sixth, with Fittipaldi directly behind him in eighth and Regazzoni in ninth. Sunday was a glorious day, clear and warm. On the parade lap, Andretti developed an ignition fault, and the start was delayed 25 minutes while the crew scrambled to solve the problem. Finally, Mario took his place on the grid, but when starter Tex Hopkins dropped the green flag, the Parnelli car sat still, and the field had to scramble to avoid him. His crew eventually got the car push started two laps late, but Andretti was black-flagged for getting assistance on the course.

=== Race start through lap 9 ===
From the start, Reutemann led Hunt, Pace, Niki Lauda, Scheckter, Fittipaldi and Regazzoni. Gradually, the gap between Reutemann and Hunt widened, and by the end of the third lap, it was clear that all was not right with Regazzoni, as a train was forming behind the Ferrari. Lauda, in fourth and just ahead of Scheckter and Fittipaldi, began to do his part in the Championship battle by holding them up for his teammate, the struggling Regazzoni, whose front end was heaving and wallowing with a defective damper.

=== Lap 10 fatal accident ===
On lap 10, the Surtees of Austrian Helmut Koinigg, in just his second Grand Prix, went off in the hairpin turn 7 where Regazzoni, Jean-Pierre Beltoise and Andretti had crashed in practice. Koinigg's car suffered a suspension failure pitching it head-on into the Armco barrier, as in François Cevert's fatal crash at The Glen one year earlier. The speed at which Koinigg crashed was relatively minor, and he ought to have escaped the scene uninjured. However, as with a number of other circuits at that time, the Armco was insecurely installed and the bottom portion of it buckled as the vehicle struck it. The car passed underneath the top portion, which remained intact, leaving the young driver with no chance as it decapitated Koinigg, killing him instantly.

=== Lap 15 through finish ===
On lap 15, Regazzoni pitted in desperation, but a tire change didn't improve his car. The Ferrari pit now told Lauda to go on, and he quickly pulled 2.5 seconds clear of Scheckter. Fittipaldi made half-hearted attempts to outbrake the Tyrrell, but, with Regazzoni out of the picture, he knew that if he could stay close, the Championship would be his.

Beginning on lap 24, a faulty shock absorber slowed Lauda, and he was caught by the group of cars he had left behind. Regazzoni pitted again, as the crew adjusted the rear anti-roll bar, but the Ferrari challenge was crumbling. When Lauda came in on lap 38, the crew discovered the offending shock absorber; when the Austrian also learned of his countryman's death, he gave up the chase.

Insistent on fighting to the end, Scheckter continued to hold fourth, ahead of Fittipaldi, throwing the Tyrrell around in opposite lock slides, as the McLaren clung to his gearbox. On the 44th lap, Scheckter's engine suddenly lost fuel pressure when a feed pipe broke. He coasted to a stop as Fittipaldi slashed by, knowing that a second World Championship in three years was his.

After the race, Scheckter admitted that he knew he was holding Fittipaldi up. "But I didn't think he should pass, although he was being pushed from behind by Arturo Merzario. He tried three times to outbrake me, but I wouldn't let him get away with it." With Scheckter out, McLaren also clinched its first Constructors' Championship, ten years after Bruce McLaren and Teddy Mayer had founded the team.

At the front, Reutemann was in no trouble. Hunt, however, was struggling with fading brakes, and Pace, in third with the second works Brabham, was ready to pounce. When he saw his opportunity, he set the race's fastest lap just five laps from the finish, and on the next lap, he took second place from the ailing Hesketh of Hunt, completing a 1–2 for Brabham.

The red and white uniforms of the McLaren crew mobbed the circuit to honor their World Champion, the Brabham team celebrated their victors, and the crowd – especially the Brazilians among them – poured over the fences and jammed the pit area. The win was the 78th for the Cosworth Ford engine in Formula One, but for the second year in a row at the Glen, it was tragically flawed by the death of a promising young driver. It was also the last US driving appearance of two-time World Champion and three-time USGP winner Graham Hill, who finished eighth in his own Embassy Hill Lola.

== Classification ==
=== Qualifying ===
| Pos | No | Driver | Constructor | Time | Gap | Grid |
|---|---|---|---|---|---|---|
| 1 | 7 | (Argentina) Carlos Reutemann | Brabham-Ford | 1:38.978 | — | 1 |
| 2 | 24 | (United Kingdom) James Hunt | Hesketh-Ford | 1:38.995 | +0.017 | 2 |
| 3 | 55 | (United States) Mario Andretti | Parnelli-Ford | 1:39.209 | +0.231 | 3 |
| 4 | 8 | (Brazil) Carlos Pace | Brabham-Ford | 1:39.284 | +0.306 | 4 |
| 5 | 12 | (Austria) Niki Lauda | Ferrari | 1:39.327 | +0.349 | 5 |
| 6 | 3 | (South Africa) Jody Scheckter | Tyrrell-Ford | 1:39.478 | +0.500 | 6 |
| 7 | 28 | (United Kingdom) John Watson | Brabham-Ford | 1:39.527 | +0.549 | 7 |
| 8 | 5 | (Brazil) Emerson Fittipaldi | McLaren-Ford | 1:39.538 | +0.560 | 8 |
| 9 | 11 | (Switzerland) Clay Regazzoni | Ferrari | 1:39.600 | +0.622 | 9 |
| 10 | 17 | (France) Jean-Pierre Jarier | Shadow-Ford | 1:40.317 | +1.339 | 10 |
| 11 | 21 | (France) Jacques Laffite | Iso-Marlboro-Ford | 1:40.597 | +1.619 | 11 |
| 12 | 15 | (New Zealand) Chris Amon | BRM | 1:40.700 | +1.722 | 12 |
| 13 | 4 | (France) Patrick Depailler | Tyrrell-Ford | 1:40.700 | +1.722 | 13 |
| 14 | 66 | (United States) Mark Donohue | Penske-Ford | 1:40.834 | +1.856 | 14 |
| 15 | 20 | (Italy) Arturo Merzario | Iso-Marlboro-Ford | 1:40.854 | +1.876 | 15 |
| 16 | 2 | (Belgium) Jacky Ickx | Lotus-Ford | 1:40.876 | +1.898 | 16 |
| 17 | 6 | (New Zealand) Denny Hulme | McLaren-Ford | 1:41.027 | +2.049 | 17 |
| 18 | 16 | (United Kingdom) Tom Pryce | Shadow-Ford | 1:41.188 | +2.210 | 18 |
| 19 | 1 | (Sweden) Ronnie Peterson | Lotus-Ford | 1:41.195 | +2.217 | 19 |
| 20 | 33 | (West Germany) Jochen Mass | McLaren-Ford | 1:41.300 | +2.392 | 20 |
| 21 | 27 | (West Germany) Rolf Stommelen | Lola-Ford | 1:41.370 | +2.392 | 21 |
| 22 | 22 | (United Kingdom) Mike Wilds | Ensign-Ford | 1:41.500 | +2.522 | 22 |
| 23 | 19 | (Austria) Helmut Koinigg | Surtees-Ford | 1:41.763 | +2.785 | 23 |
| 24 | 26 | (United Kingdom) Graham Hill | Lola-Ford | 1:41.901 | +2.923 | 24 |
| 25 | 10 | (Italy) Vittorio Brambilla | March-Ford | 1:42.031 | +3.053 | 25 |
| 26 | 18 | (France) José Dolhem | Surtees-Ford | 1:42.031 | +3.053 | 26^{1} |
| 27 | 31 | (Australia) Tim Schenken | Lotus-Ford | 1:42.243 | +3.265 | 27^{2} |
| 28 | 9 | (West Germany) Hans-Joachim Stuck | March-Ford | 1:43.606 | +4.628 | — |
| 29 | 42 | (United Kingdom) Ian Ashley | Brabham-Ford | 1:43.801 | +4.823 | — |
| 30 | 14 | (France) Jean-Pierre Beltoise | BRM | — | — | — |

*Positions with a pink background indicate drivers that failed to qualify

- ^1 — Dolhem was allowed to start at the back of the grid despite failing to qualify in the top 25 as "first reserve".
- ^2 — Schenken had illegally started at the back of the grid after failing to qualify.

=== Race ===
| Pos | No | Driver | Constructor | Laps | Time/Retired | Grid | Points |
|---|---|---|---|---|---|---|---|
| 1 | 7 | (Argentina) Carlos Reutemann | Brabham-Ford | 59 | 1:40:21.439 | 1 | 9 |
| 2 | 8 | (Brazil) Carlos Pace | Brabham-Ford | 59 | + 10.735 | 4 | 6 |
| 3 | 24 | (United Kingdom) James Hunt | Hesketh-Ford | 59 | + 1:10.384 | 2 | 4 |
| 4 | 5 | (Brazil) Emerson Fittipaldi | McLaren-Ford | 59 | + 1:17.753 | 8 | 3 |
| 5 | 28 | (United Kingdom) John Watson | Brabham-Ford | 59 | + 1:25.804 | 7 | 2 |
| 6 | 4 | (France) Patrick Depailler | Tyrrell-Ford | 59 | + 1:27.506 | 13 | 1 |
| 7 | 33 | (West Germany) Jochen Mass | McLaren-Ford | 59 | + 1:30.012 | 20 | |
| 8 | 26 | (United Kingdom) Graham Hill | Lola-Ford | 58 | + 1 Lap | 24 | |
| 9 | 15 | (New Zealand) Chris Amon | BRM | 57 | + 2 Laps | 12 | |
| 10 | 17 | (France) Jean-Pierre Jarier | Shadow-Ford | 57 | + 2 Laps | 10 | |
| 11 | 11 | (Switzerland) Clay Regazzoni | Ferrari | 55 | + 4 Laps | 9 | |
| 12 | 27 | (West Germany) Rolf Stommelen | Lola-Ford | 54 | + 5 Laps | 21 | |
| Ret | 1 | (Sweden) Ronnie Peterson | Lotus-Ford | 52 | Fuel System | 19 | |
| NC | 22 | (United Kingdom) Mike Wilds | Ensign-Ford | 50 | + 9 Laps | 22 | |
| NC | 16 | (United Kingdom) Tom Pryce | Shadow-Ford | 47 | + 12 Laps | 18 | |
| Ret | 3 | (South Africa) Jody Scheckter | Tyrrell-Ford | 44 | Fuel System | 6 | |
| Ret | 20 | (Italy) Arturo Merzario | Iso-Marlboro-Ford | 43 | Electrical | 15 | |
| Ret | 12 | (Austria) Niki Lauda | Ferrari | 38 | Suspension | 5 | |
| Ret | 21 | (France) Jacques Laffite | Iso-Marlboro-Ford | 31 | Engine | 11 | |
| Ret | 66 | (United States) Mark Donohue | Penske-Ford | 27 | Suspension | 14 | |
| WD | 18 | (France) José Dolhem | Surtees-Ford | 25 | Withdrew | 26 | |
| Ret | 10 | (Italy) Vittorio Brambilla | March-Ford | 21 | Fuel System | 25 | |
| Ret | 19 | (Austria) Helmut Koinigg | Surtees-Ford | 9 | Fatal Accident | 23 | |
| Ret | 2 | (Belgium) Jacky Ickx | Lotus-Ford | 7 | Suspension | 16 | |
| DSQ | 31 | (Australia) Tim Schenken | Lotus-Ford | 6 | Entered Race Illegally | 27 | |
| DSQ | 55 | (United States) Mario Andretti | Parnelli-Ford | 4 | Push Start | 3 | |
| Ret | 6 | (New Zealand) Denny Hulme | McLaren-Ford | 4 | Engine | 17 | |
| DNQ | 9 | (West Germany) Hans Joachim Stuck | March-Ford | | | | |
| DNQ | 42 | (United Kingdom) Ian Ashley | Brabham-Ford | | | | |
| DNQ | 14 | (France) Jean-Pierre Beltoise | BRM | | Practice Accident | | |

== Final Championship standings ==
Drivers' Championship standings

| Pos | Driver | Points |
|---|---|---|
| 1 | (Brazil) **Emerson Fittipaldi*** | 55 |
| 2 | (Switzerland) Clay Regazzoni | 52 |
| 3 | (South Africa) Jody Scheckter | 45 |
| 4 | (Austria) Niki Lauda | 38 |
| 5 | (Sweden) Ronnie Peterson | 35 |

Constructors' Championship standings

| Pos | Constructor | Points |
|---|---|---|
| 1 | (United Kingdom) **McLaren-Ford*** | 73 (75) |
| 2 | (Italy) Ferrari | 65 |
| 3 | (United Kingdom) Tyrrell-Ford | 52 |
| 4 | (United Kingdom) Lotus-Ford | 42 |
| 5 | (United Kingdom) Brabham-Ford | 35 |

- Note: Only the top five positions are included for both sets of standings. Only the best 7 results from the first 8 races and the best 6 results from the last 7 races counted towards the Championship. Numbers without parentheses are Championship points; numbers in parentheses are total points scored.
- Competitors in bold and marked with an asterisk are the 1974 World Champions.

| Previous race: 1974 Canadian Grand Prix | FIA Formula One World Championship; 1974 season | Next race: 1975 Argentine Grand Prix |
| Previous race: 1973 United States Grand Prix | United States Grand Prix | Next race: 1975 United States Grand Prix |
