= 1974 Italian Grand Prix =

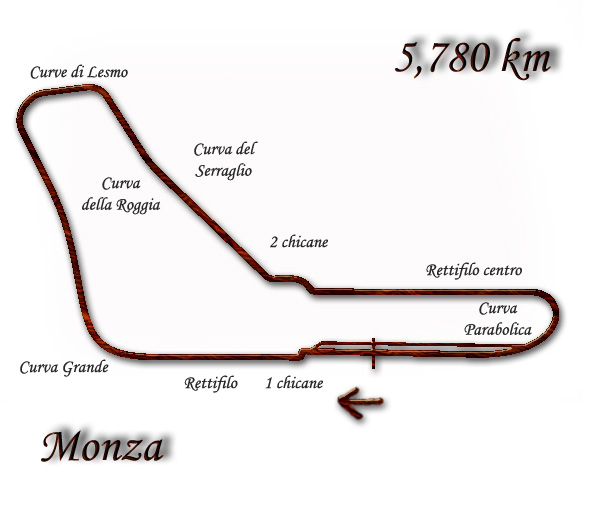

Race details
- Date: September 8, 1974
- Official name: XLV Gran Premio d'Italia
- Location: Autodromo Nazionale di Monza, Monza, Italy
- Course: Permanent racing facility
- Course length: 5.780 km (3.591 miles)
- Distance: 52 laps, 300.56 km (186.732 miles)

Pole position
| Driver | (Austria) Niki Lauda | Ferrari |
- Time: 1:33.16

Fastest lap
| Driver | (Brazil) Carlos Pace | Brabham-Ford |
- Time: 1:34.2 on lap 46

Podium
| First | (Sweden) Ronnie Peterson | Lotus-Ford |
| Second | (Brazil) Emerson Fittipaldi | McLaren-Ford |
| Third | (South Africa) Jody Scheckter | Tyrrell-Ford |

The 1974 Italian Grand Prix was a Formula One motor race held at Monza on 8 September 1974. It was race 13 of 15 in both the 1974 World Championship of Drivers and the 1974 International Cup for Formula One Manufacturers. The 52-lap race was won by Lotus driver Ronnie Peterson after he started from seventh position. Emerson Fittipaldi finished second for the McLaren team and Tyrrell driver Jody Scheckter came in third.

== Qualifying ==
=== Qualifying classification ===
| Pos. | Driver | Constructor | Time | No |
|---|---|---|---|---|
| 1 | (Austria) Niki Lauda | Ferrari | 1:33.16 | 1 |
| 2 | (Argentina) Carlos Reutemann | Brabham-Ford | 1:33.27 | 2 |
| 3 | (Brazil) Carlos Pace | Brabham-Ford | 1:33.53 | 3 |
| 4 | (United Kingdom) John Watson | Brabham-Ford | 1:33.63 | 4 |
| 5 | (Switzerland) Clay Regazzoni | Ferrari | 1:33.73 | 5 |
| 6 | (Brazil) Emerson Fittipaldi | McLaren-Ford | 1:33.95 | 6 |
| 7 | (Sweden) Ronnie Peterson | Lotus-Ford | 1:34.24 | 7 |
| 8 | (United Kingdom) James Hunt | Hesketh-Ford | 1:34.34 | 8 |
| 9 | (France) Jean-Pierre Jarier | Shadow-Ford | 1:34.560 | 9 |
| 10 | (France) Patrick Depailler | Tyrrell-Ford | 1:34.561 | 10 |
| 11 | (France) Jean-Pierre Beltoise | BRM | 1:34.62 | 11 |
| 12 | (South Africa) Jody Scheckter | Tyrrell-Ford | 1:34.70 | 12 |
| 13 | (Italy) Vittorio Brambilla | March-Ford | 1:34.76 | 13 |
| 14 | (West Germany) Rolf Stommelen | Lola-Ford | 1:34.84 | 14 |
| 15 | (Italy) Arturo Merzario | Iso-Marlboro-Ford | 1:35.02 | 15 |
| 16 | (Belgium) Jacky Ickx | Lotus-Ford | 1:35.19 | 16 |
| 17 | (France) Jacques Laffite | Iso-Marlboro-Ford | 1:35.22 | 17 |
| 18 | (West Germany) Hans Joachim Stuck | March-Ford | 1:35.23 | 18 |
| 19 | (New Zealand) Denny Hulme | McLaren-Ford | 1:35.63 | 19 |
| 20 | (Australia) Tim Schenken | Trojan-Ford | 1:35.72 | 20 |
| 21 | (United Kingdom) Graham Hill | Lola-Ford | 1:35.82 | 21 |
| 22 | (United Kingdom) Tom Pryce | Shadow-Ford | 1:36.27 | 22 |
| 23 | (United Kingdom) David Hobbs | McLaren-Ford | 1:36.31 | 23 |
| 24 | (France) François Migault | BRM | 1:36.36 | 24 |
| 25 | (France) Henri Pescarolo | BRM | 1:36.64 | 25 |
| 26 | (France) José Dolhem | Surtees-Ford | 1:36.84 | — |
| 27 | (Italy) Carlo Facetti | Brabham-Ford | 1:37.30 | — |
| 28 | (United Kingdom) Derek Bell | Surtees-Ford | 1:37.32 | — |
| 29 | (United Kingdom) Mike Wilds | Ensign-Ford | 1:37.38 | — |
| 30 | (New Zealand) Chris Amon | Amon-Ford | 1:38.21 | — |
| 31 | (Finland) Leo Kinnunen | Surtees-Ford | 1:40.32 | — |

*Positions with a pink background indicate drivers that failed to qualify

== Race ==
=== Classification ===
| Pos | No | Driver | Constructor | Laps | Time/Retired | Grid | Points |
|---|---|---|---|---|---|---|---|
| 1 | 1 | (Sweden) Ronnie Peterson | Lotus-Ford | 52 | 1:22:56.6 | 7 | 9 |
| 2 | 5 | (Brazil) Emerson Fittipaldi | McLaren-Ford | 52 | + 0.8 | 6 | 6 |
| 3 | 3 | (South Africa) Jody Scheckter | Tyrrell-Ford | 52 | + 24.7 | 12 | 4 |
| 4 | 20 | (Italy) Arturo Merzario | Iso-Marlboro-Ford | 52 | + 1:27.7 | 15 | 3 |
| 5 | 8 | (Brazil) Carlos Pace | Brabham-Ford | 51 | + 1 Lap | 3 | 2 |
| 6 | 6 | (New Zealand) Denny Hulme | McLaren-Ford | 51 | + 1 Lap | 19 | 1 |
| 7 | 28 | (United Kingdom) John Watson | Brabham-Ford | 51 | + 1 Lap | 4 | |
| 8 | 26 | (United Kingdom) Graham Hill | Lola-Ford | 51 | + 1 Lap | 21 | |
| 9 | 33 | (United Kingdom) David Hobbs | McLaren-Ford | 51 | + 1 Lap | 23 | |
| 10 | 16 | (United Kingdom) Tom Pryce | Shadow-Ford | 50 | + 2 Laps | 22 | |
| 11 | 4 | (France) Patrick Depailler | Tyrrell-Ford | 50 | + 2 Laps | 10 | |
| Ret | 11 | (Switzerland) Clay Regazzoni | Ferrari | 40 | Engine | 5 | |
| Ret | 12 | (Austria) Niki Lauda | Ferrari | 32 | Engine | 1 | |
| Ret | 2 | (Belgium) Jacky Ickx | Lotus-Ford | 30 | Throttle | 16 | |
| Ret | 27 | (West Germany) Rolf Stommelen | Lola-Ford | 25 | Suspension | 14 | |
| Ret | 21 | (France) Jacques Laffite | Iso-Marlboro-Ford | 22 | Engine | 17 | |
| Ret | 17 | (France) Jean-Pierre Jarier | Shadow-Ford | 19 | Engine | 9 | |
| Ret | 10 | (Italy) Vittorio Brambilla | March-Ford | 16 | Accident | 13 | |
| Ret | 29 | (Australia) Tim Schenken | Trojan-Ford | 15 | Gearbox | 20 | |
| Ret | 7 | (Argentina) Carlos Reutemann | Brabham-Ford | 12 | Gearbox | 2 | |
| Ret | 9 | (West Germany) Hans Joachim Stuck | March-Ford | 11 | Chassis | 18 | |
| Ret | 15 | (France) Henri Pescarolo | BRM | 3 | Engine | 25 | |
| Ret | 24 | (United Kingdom) James Hunt | Hesketh-Ford | 2 | Engine | 8 | |
| Ret | 37 | (France) François Migault | BRM | 1 | Gearbox | 24 | |
| Ret | 14 | (France) Jean-Pierre Beltoise | BRM | 0 | Electrical | 11 | |
| DNQ | 19 | (France) José Dolhem | Surtees-Ford | | | | |
| DNQ | 31 | (Italy) Carlo Facetti | Brabham-Ford | | | | |
| DNQ | 18 | (United Kingdom) Derek Bell | Surtees-Ford | | | | |
| DNQ | 25 | (United Kingdom) Mike Wilds | Ensign-Ford | | | | |
| DNQ | 30 | (New Zealand) Chris Amon | Amon-Ford | | | | |
| DNQ | 23 | (Finland) Leo Kinnunen | Surtees-Ford | | | | |

== Notes ==
- This was the Formula One World Championship debut for Italian driver Carlo Facetti.
- This race marked the 100th podium finish for Lotus.

== Championship standings after the race ==
Drivers' Championship standings

| | Pos | Driver | Points |
|---|---|---|---|
| | 1 | (Switzerland) **Clay Regazzoni*** | 46 |
| | 2 | (South Africa) **Jody Scheckter*** | 45 |
| 1 | 3 | (Brazil) **Emerson Fittipaldi*** | 43 |
| 1 | 4 | (Austria) **Niki Lauda*** | 38 |
| 1 | 5 | (Sweden) **Ronnie Peterson*** | 31 |

Constructors' Championship standings

| | Pos | Constructor | Points |
|---|---|---|---|
| 1 | 1 | (United Kingdom) **McLaren-Ford*** | 61 (63) |
| 1 | 2 | (Italy) **Ferrari*** | 59 |
| | 3 | (United Kingdom) **Tyrrell-Ford*** | 49 |
| | 4 | (United Kingdom) Lotus-Ford | 38 |
| | 5 | (United Kingdom) Brabham-Ford | 26 |

- Note: Only the top five positions are included for both sets of standings. Only the best 7 results from the first 8 races and the best 6 results from the last 7 races counted towards the Championship. Numbers without parentheses are Championship points; numbers in parentheses are total points scored.
- Competitors in bold and marked with an asterisk still had a theoretical chance of becoming World Champion.

| Previous race: 1974 Austrian Grand Prix | FIA Formula One World Championship; 1974 season | Next race: 1974 Canadian Grand Prix |
| Previous race: 1973 Italian Grand Prix | Italian Grand Prix | Next race: 1975 Italian Grand Prix |
