= 1974 Austrian Grand Prix =

- The Österreichring (1969-76)

Race details
- Date: 18 August 1974
- Official name: XII Memphis Grand Prix von Österreich
- Location: Österreichring; Spielberg, Styria, Austria
- Course: Permanent racing facility
- Course length: 5.911 km (3.673 miles)

Pole position
Driver	(Austria) Niki Lauda	Ferrari
- Time: 1:35.40

Fastest lap
Driver	(Switzerland) Clay Regazzoni	Ferrari
- Time: 1:37.22 on lap 46

Podium
First	(Argentina) Carlos Reutemann	Brabham-Ford
Second	(New Zealand) Denny Hulme	McLaren-Ford
Third	(United Kingdom) James Hunt	Hesketh-Ford

The 1974 Austrian Grand Prix was a Formula One motor race held at Österreichring on 18 August 1974. It was race 12 of 15 in both the 1974 World Championship of Drivers and the 1974 International Cup for Formula One Manufacturers. The 54-lap race was won by Carlos Reutemann, driving a Brabham-Ford, with Denny Hulme second in a McLaren-Ford and James Hunt third in a Hesketh-Ford. Hulme in this race achieved his last podium finish of his Formula One career.

As of 2025, Hulme's podium remains the last achieved by a New Zealand driver in Formula One.

== Qualifying ==
=== Qualifying classification ===
Pos	No	Driver	Constructor	Time	Gap
1	12	(Austria) Niki Lauda	Ferrari	1:35.40	-
2	7	(Argentina) Carlos Reutemann	Brabham-Ford	1:35.56	+0.16
3	5	(Brazil) Emerson Fittipaldi	McLaren-Ford	1:35.76	+0.36
4	8	(Brazil) Carlos Pace	Brabham-Ford	1:35.91	+0.51
5	3	(South Africa) Jody Scheckter	Tyrrell-Ford	1:35.94	+0.54
6	1	(Sweden) Ronnie Peterson	Lotus-Ford	1:36.00	+0.60
7	24	(United Kingdom) James Hunt	Hesketh-Ford	1:36.11	+0.71
8	11	(Switzerland) Clay Regazzoni	Ferrari	1:36.31	+0.91
9	20	(Italy) Arturo Merzario	Iso-Ford	1:36.35	+0.95
10	6	(New Zealand) Denny Hulme	McLaren-Ford	1:36.39	+0.99
11	28	(United Kingdom) John Watson	Brabham-Ford	1:36.52	+1.12
12	21	(France) Jacques Laffite	Iso-Ford	1:36.86	+1.46
13	27	(West Germany) Rolf Stommelen	Lola-Ford	1:37.18	+1.78
14	4	(France) Patrick Depailler	Tyrrell-Ford	1:37.25	+1.85
15	9	(West Germany) Hans-Joachim Stuck	March-Ford	1:37.37	+1.97
16	16	(United Kingdom) Tom Pryce	Shadow-Ford	1:37.39	+1.99
17	33	(United Kingdom) David Hobbs	McLaren-Ford	1:37.41	+2.01
18	14	(France) Jean-Pierre Beltoise	BRM	1:37.43	+2.03
19	23	(Australia) Tim Schenken	Trojan-Ford	1:37.43	+2.03
20	10	(Italy) Vittorio Brambilla	March-Ford	1:37.47	+2.07
21	26	(United Kingdom) Graham Hill	Lola-Ford	1:37.54	+2.14
22	2	(Belgium) Jacky Ickx	Lotus-Ford	1:38.09	+2.69
23	17	(France) Jean-Pierre Jarier	Shadow-Ford	1:38.17	+2.77
24	35	(United Kingdom) Ian Ashley	Token-Ford	1:38.67	+3.27
25	30	(Austria) Dieter Quester	Surtees-Ford	1:38.88	+3.48
26	31	(South Africa) Ian Scheckter	Hesketh-Ford	1:39.17	+3.77
27	43	(Finland) Leo Kinnunen	Surtees-Ford	1:39.47	+4.07
28	18	(United Kingdom) Derek Bell	Surtees-Ford	1:39.53	+4.13
29	22	(United Kingdom) Mike Wilds	Ensign-Ford	1:39.96	+4.56
30	19	(France) Jean-Pierre Jabouille	Surtees-Ford	1:40.10	+4.70
31	32	(Austria) Helmut Koinigg	Brabham-Ford	1:40.60	+5.20

*Positions with a pink background indicate drivers that failed to qualify

== Race ==
=== Classification ===
Pos	No	Driver	Constructor	Laps	Time/Retired	Grid	Points
1	7	(Argentina) Carlos Reutemann	Brabham-Ford	54	1:28:44.72	2	9
2	6	(New Zealand) Denny Hulme	McLaren-Ford	54	+ 42.92	10	6
3	24	(United Kingdom) James Hunt	Hesketh-Ford	54	+ 1:01.54	7	4
4	28	(United Kingdom) John Watson	Brabham-Ford	54	+ 1:09.39	11	3
5	11	(Switzerland) Clay Regazzoni	Ferrari	54	+ 1:13.08	8	2
6	10	(Italy) Vittorio Brambilla	March-Ford	54	+ 1:13.82	20	1
7	33	(United Kingdom) David Hobbs	McLaren-Ford	53	+ 1 Lap	17	
8	17	(France) Jean-Pierre Jarier	Shadow-Ford	52	+ 2 Laps	23	
9	30	(Austria) Dieter Quester	Surtees-Ford	51	+ 3 Laps	25	
10	23	(Australia) Tim Schenken	Trojan-Ford	50	+ 4 Laps	19	
11	9	(Germany) Hans-Joachim Stuck	March-Ford	48	Suspension	15	
12	26	(United Kingdom) Graham Hill	Lola-Ford	48	+ 6 Laps	21	
NC	35	(United Kingdom) Ian Ashley	Token-Ford	46	+ 8 Laps	24	
Ret	1	(Sweden) Ronnie Peterson	Lotus-Ford	45	Halfshaft	6	
Ret	2	(Belgium) Jacky Ickx	Lotus-Ford	43	Collision	22	
Ret	4	(France) Patrick Depailler	Tyrrell-Ford	42	Collision	14	
Ret	8	(Brazil) Carlos Pace	Brabham-Ford	41	Fuel Leak	4	
Ret	5	(Brazil) Emerson Fittipaldi	McLaren-Ford	37	Engine	3	
NC	21	(France) Jacques Laffite	Iso-Marlboro-Ford	37	+ 17 Laps	12	
Ret	20	(Italy) Arturo Merzario	Iso-Marlboro-Ford	24	Fuel System	9	
Ret	16	(United Kingdom) Tom Pryce	Shadow-Ford	22	Spun Off	16	
Ret	14	(France) Jean-Pierre Beltoise	BRM	22	Engine	18	
Ret	12	(Austria) Niki Lauda	Ferrari	17	Engine	1	
Ret	27	(Germany) Rolf Stommelen	Lola-Ford	14	Accident	13	
Ret	3	(South Africa) Jody Scheckter	Tyrrell-Ford	8	Engine	5	
DNQ	31	(South Africa) Ian Scheckter	Hesketh-Ford				
DNQ	43	(Finland) Leo Kinnunen	Surtees-Ford				
DNQ	18	(United Kingdom) Derek Bell	Surtees-Ford				
DNQ	22	(United Kingdom) Mike Wilds	Ensign-Ford				
DNQ	19	(France) Jean-Pierre Jabouille	Surtees-Ford				
DNQ	32	(Austria) Helmut Koinigg	Brabham-Ford				

== Notes ==
- This was the Formula One World Championship debut for Austrian driver Helmut Koinigg.
- This was the 10th Grand Prix start for British constructor Hesketh.
- This race marked the 198th, 199th and 200th podium finish for a Ford-powered car.

== Championship standings after the race ==
Drivers' Championship standings

	Pos	Driver	Points
	1	(Switzerland) **Clay Regazzoni***	46
	2	(South Africa) **Jody Scheckter***	41
	3	(Austria) **Niki Lauda***	38
	4	(Brazil) **Emerson Fittipaldi***	37
1	5	(Argentina) **Carlos Reutemann***	23

Constructors' Championship standings

Pos	Constructor	Points
1	(Italy) **Ferrari***	59
2	(United Kingdom) **McLaren-Ford***	55 (57)
3	(United Kingdom) **Tyrrell-Ford***	45
4	(United Kingdom) Lotus-Ford	29
5	(United Kingdom) Brabham-Ford	24

- Note: Only the top five positions are included for both sets of standings. Only the best 7 results from the first 8 races and the best 6 results from the last 7 races counted towards the Championship. Numbers without parentheses are Championship points; numbers in parentheses are total points scored.
- Competitors in bold and marked with an asterisk still had a theoretical chance of becoming World Champion.

Previous race: 1974 German Grand Prix	FIA Formula One World Championship; 1974 season	Next race: 1974 Italian Grand Prix
Previous race: 1973 Austrian Grand Prix	Austrian Grand Prix	Next race: 1975 Austrian Grand Prix
