= 1976 Shellsport International Series =

Seasons
- ← 1975 1977 →

The 1976 Shellsport International Series was a Formula Libre motor racing championship held in the United Kingdom, the series ran F1, F2, F5000 and Formula Atlantic cars in the same race. The first Shellsport International Series was contested over 13 rounds. The season started on 21 March and ended on 7 November. The Drivers' Championship was won by Englishman David Purley.

== Teams and drivers ==
Entry List
Team	No.	Driver	Chassis	Engine	Rounds
Formula 1
(United Kingdom) The Ultramar Ensign	2	(United Kingdom) Guy Edwards	Ensign N174	Ford Cosworth DFV 3.0 V8	6
(United Kingdom) Hexagon Racing	3	(United Kingdom) Damien Magee	Penske PC3	Ford Cosworth DFV 3.0 V8	9–11
(United Kingdom) Hexagon Racing	3	(United Kingdom) Derek Bell	Penske PC3	Ford Cosworth DFV 3.0 V8	12–13
(United Kingdom) RAM Racing	8	(United Kingdom) Andy Sutcliffe	Brabham BT44B	Ford Cosworth DFV 3.0 V8	9–10
(United Kingdom) RAM Racing	2	(United Kingdom) Guy Edwards	Brabham BT42	Ford Cosworth DFV 3.0 V8	11–12
(United Kingdom) Team PR Reilly	10	(United Kingdom) Roger Springett	Shadow DN1	Ford Cosworth DFV 3.0 V8	1
(United Kingdom) Team PR Reilly	10	(United Kingdom) Richard Scott	Shadow DN1	Ford Cosworth DFV 3.0 V8	2
(United Kingdom) Team PR Reilly	10	(Italy) Lella Lombardi	Shadow DN1	Ford Cosworth DFV 3.0 V8	3–4
(United Kingdom) Team PR Reilly	10	(United Kingdom) Mike Wilds	Shadow DN3B	Ford Cosworth DFV 3.0 V8	5–8, 13
(United Kingdom) Team PR Reilly	11	(United Kingdom) Mike Wilds	Ensign N174	Ford Cosworth DFV 3.0 V8	9–10
(Italy) Jolly Club	11	(Italy) Luigi-Mimmo Cevasco	Brabham BT42	Ford Cosworth DFV 3.0 V8	1
(United Kingdom) ShellSport Whiting	13	(United Kingdom) Divina Galica	Surtees TS16	Ford Cosworth DFV 3.0 V8	All
(Australia) Brian McGuire	21	(Australia) Brian McGuire	Williams FW04	Ford Cosworth DFV 3.0 V8	2–12
(United Kingdom) Roger Heavens Racing	32	(Spain) Emilio de Villota	Lyncar 006	Ford Cosworth DFV 3.0 V8	1–4, 6–10, 12–13
Sports Cars of Austria	59	(Austria) Karl Oppitzhauser	March 761	Ford Cosworth DFV 3.0 V8	9
Formula 2
(United Kingdom) Brian Robinson	4	(United Kingdom) Brian Robinson	Lola T360	Ford BDG Close 2.0 L4	1–6, 9, 12
(United Kingdom) Brian Robinson	4	(United Kingdom) Brian Robinson	Lola T360	Ford BDE 2.0 L4	7
(United Kingdom) Bob Gerard Racing	6	(United States) Bill Gubelmann	March 732/752	Ford BDG 2.0 L4	1–3, 5, 7
(United Kingdom) Bob Howlings	9	(United Kingdom) Bob Howlings	Brabham BT36	Ford Cosworth FVC 1.8 L4	3
(United Kingdom) John Tait	9	(United Kingdom) John Tait	Brabham BT36	Ford Cosworth FVC 1.8 L4	5–7
(United Kingdom) Marshall Wingfield Ltd	12	(United Kingdom) John Wingfield	Ralt RT1	Ford BDG Somers 2.0 L4	1, 3–4, 9–10
(United Kingdom) Ardmore Racing	14	(United Kingdom) Ray Mallock	Lola T450	Ford BDX Swindon 2.0 L4	1
(United Kingdom) Ardmore Racing	14	(United Kingdom) Ray Mallock	March 75B	Ford BDX Swindon 2.0 L4	2, 8–10, 12–13
(United Kingdom) David Price Racing	15	(United Kingdom) Valentino Musetti	March 752	Ford BDX Swindon 2.0 L4	1–6, 8, 12–13
(United Kingdom) Roy Baker	18	(United Kingdom) Roy Baker	March 752	Ford BDG 2.0 L4	5, 8–10, 12
(United Kingdom) Bob and Marj Brown	23	(Australia) Bob Muir	Chevron B35	Ford BDX Swindon 2.0 L4	9
(United Kingdom) R. E. Bates and Sons Builders	24	(United Kingdom) Geoff Friswell	March 732/742	Hart 420R 2.0 L4	11–13
(United Kingdom) Myson Racing	27	(United Kingdom) Richard Robarts	March 752	Ford BDG Richardson 2.0 L4	1
(United Kingdom) Myson Racing	27	(United Kingdom) Richard Robarts	March 762	Hart 420R 2.0 L4	8–9, 12–13
(United Kingdom) Hillcrest Used Cars	29	(United Kingdom) John Calvert	March 732/752	Ford BDA 2.0 L4	1, 3
(United Kingdom) Netherton and Worth-Boxer Cars	30	(United States) Tony Rouff	Boxer PR276	Ford BDX Swindon 2.0 L4	2, 7, 9
(United Kingdom) Netherton and Worth-Boxer Cars	30	(United Kingdom) Brian Henton	Boxer PR276	Ford BDX Swindon 2.0 L4	11
(United Kingdom) Netherton and Worth-Boxer Cars	30	(United Kingdom) Brian Henton	Boxer PR276	Ford BDG 2.0 L4	12
(United Kingdom) Netherton and Worth-Boxer Cars	30	(United States) Tony Rouff	Boxer PR276	Ford BDG 2.0 L4	13
(United Kingdom) Dicksons of Perth	33	(United Kingdom) Norman Dickson	Modus M3	Ford BDX Swindon 2.0 L4	3–4, 6–10
(United Kingdom) Dicksons of Perth	34	(United Kingdom) Richard Scott	Modus M3	Ford BDX Swindon 2.0 L4	3–4, 6–10
(United Kingdom) Andy Barton	36	(United Kingdom) Andy Barton	March 73B/75B	Ford BDG 2.0 L4	3, 7, 11
(Mexico) Philip Guerola	37	(Mexico) Philip Guerola	Brabham BT30	Ford Cosworth FVC 1.9 L4	4–7, 12–13
(United Kingdom) Pinch Plant Ltd.	40	(New Zealand) John Nicholson	March 752	Chevrolet Vega 2.0 L4	5, 8–10, 12–13
(United Kingdom) Bob Salisbury Racing	46	(Belgium) Bernard de Dryver	March 752	BMW M12 2.0 L4	8–13
(United Kingdom) Withers of Winsford	49	(Spain) José Maria de Uriarte	March 762	Ford BDX Richardson 2.0 L4	9, 12–13
(United Kingdom) Withers of Winsford	49	(United Kingdom) Derrick Worthington	March 762	Ford BDX Richardson 2.0 L4	8, 10–11
(United Kingdom) Team Modus Ltd	53	(United Kingdom) Ian Grob	Modus M7	Hart 420R 2.0 L4	9
(United Kingdom) Project Four Racing	55	(United States) Eddie Cheever	Ralt RT1	Hart 420R 2.0 L4	9, 13
(West Germany) ATS Racing Team	56	(Finland) Mika Arpiainen	Chevron B35	BMW M12 2.0 L4	9
(West Germany) ATS Racing Team	57	(United States) Ted Wentz	Lola T450	Hart 420R 2.0 L4	9
(United Kingdom) Chevron Racing Team	58	(Austria) Hans Binder	Chevron B35	BMW M12 2.0 L4	9
(United States) Fred Opert Racing	65	(United Kingdom) Ian Grob	Chevron B35	Hart 420R 2.0 L4	12–13
Formula 5000
(United Kingdom) David Hepworth	1	(United Kingdom) Bob Evans	McLaren M25	Chevrolet 5.0 V8	9–10
Theodore Racing Hong Kong	2	(Australia) Alan Jones	Lola T330	Chevrolet 5.0 V8	3–4
(United Kingdom) Hexagon Racing	3	(United Kingdom) Damien Magee	March 75A	Ford GAA 3.4 V6	1–8
(United Kingdom) Chris Featherstone	5	(United Kingdom) Chris Featherstone	McRae GM1	Chevrolet 5.0 V8	1–10, 12
(United Kingdom) LEC Refrigeration Racing	7	(United Kingdom) David Purley	Chevron B30	Ford GAA 3.4 V6	All
(United Kingdom) Bob Howlings	9	(United Kingdom) Bob Howlings	Chevron B28	Chevrolet 5.0 V8	1
(United Kingdom) David Price Racing	15	(United Kingdom) Valentino Musetti	March 752	Ford GAA 3.4 V6	7, 9–11
(United Kingdom) E. L. Gibbs Ltd. Racing	25	(United Kingdom) Keith Holland	Lola T400	Chevrolet 5.0 V8	3–13
(United Kingdom) Chris Choat	41	(United Kingdom) Chris Choat	Trojan T101	Chevrolet 5.0 V8	5–6, 10, 12
(United Kingdom) Allan Kayes	75	(United Kingdom) Allan Kayes	Lola T330	Chevrolet 5.0 V8	8, 10–11, 13
(United Kingdom) Dennis Leech	77	(United Kingdom) Dennis Leech	Chevron B28	Chevrolet 5.0 V8	5–11, 13
(Republic of Ireland) Jim Kelly	78	(Republic of Ireland) Jim Kelly	Trojan T101	Chevrolet 5.0 V8	5–9
(United Kingdom) Richard Oaten Racing	99	(Canada) John Cannon	March 73A/751	Chevrolet 5.0 V8	1–4
Formula Atlantic
(United Kingdom) Graham Eden Racing	5	(Australia) Terry Perkins	Sana RD9	Ford BDA 1.6 L4	7, 10
(United Kingdom) Spax Dampers	19	(United Kingdom) Jeremy Rossiter	Chevron B29	Ford BDA Swindon 1.6 L4	3, 9
(United Kingdom) Spax Dampers	19	(United Kingdom) Jeremy Rossiter	Chevron B29	Ford BDA Cook 1.6 L4	4
(United Kingdom) Melchester Racing	22	(United Kingdom) Tony Trimmer	Lola T460	Ford BDA Swindon 1.6 L4	9
(United Kingdom) David Price Racing	26	(Republic of Ireland) Martin Birrane	Chevron B29	Ford BDA 1.6 L4	6
(United Kingdom) Marshall Wingfield	26	(United Kingdom) Jim Crawford	Chevron B34	Ford BDA Hart 1.6 L4	13
(United Kingdom) Netherton and Worth-Boxer Cars	30	(United Kingdom) Brian Henton	Boxer PR276	Ford BDA Swindon 1.6 L4	10
(United Kingdom) Netherton and Worth-Boxer Cars	30	(United States) Tony Rouff	Boxer PRA76	Ford BDA Swindon 1.6 L4	12
(United Kingdom) Derek Cook	31	(United Kingdom) Derek Cook	Chevron B27	Ford BDA Cook 1.6 L4	7, 10–12
(United Kingdom) Richard Scott	34	(United Kingdom) Richard Scott	Modus M3	Ford BDA Nicholson 1.6 L4	1
(United Kingdom) Coin News	39	(United Kingdom) Jim Crawford	Chevron B29	Ford BDA Nicholson 1.6 L4	3–5
(United Kingdom) Jeremy Sumner	42	(United Kingdom) Jeremy Sumner	Chevron B27	Ford BDA Swindon 1.6 L4	5, 10
(United Kingdom) John Bowtell	44	(United Kingdom) John Bowtell	March 74B	Ford BDA 1.6 L4	5–7
(United Kingdom) Brauch Racing	47	(United Kingdom) Mike King	Lola T362	Ford BDA 1.6 L4	6, 9–12
(United Kingdom) Adrian Russell	48	(United Kingdom) Adrian Russell	Lola T450	Ford BDA Swindon 1.6 L4	9–10
(Republic of Ireland) L & B Excavators	50	(Republic of Ireland) Alo Lawler	Chevron B29	Ford BDA Swindon 1.6 L4	3, 6–7
(Republic of Ireland) Martin Birrane	50	(Republic of Ireland) Martin Birrane	Chevron B29	Ford BDA Nicholson 1.6 L4	9, 12
(United Kingdom) Harrisons of Birmingham Ltd	51	(United Kingdom) Nick May	Sana RD9	Ford BDA 1.6 L4	12–13
(United Kingdom) Phil Sharpe	52	(United Kingdom) Phil Sharpe	Modus M3	Ford BDA Nicholson 1.6 L4	6–8
(United Kingdom) Ken Bailey	62	(United Kingdom) Ken Bailey	Chevron B29	Ford BDA Nicholson 1.6 L4	7, 9, 11
(United Kingdom) Withers Winsford	69	(United Kingdom) David Winstanley	Brabham BT40	Ford BDA Eden 1.6 L4	3
(United Kingdom) Sana/Withers of Winsford	69	(United Kingdom) Cyd Williams	Sana RD9	Ford BDA Eden 1.6 L4	4
(United Kingdom) Sana/Withers of Winsford	69	(United Kingdom) Cyd Williams	Sana RD11	Ford BDA Swindon 1.6 L4	11, 13
(United Kingdom) Sangria Designs	86	(United Kingdom) Phil Dowsett	Chevron B29	Ford BDA Swindon 1.6 L4	7, 9
(United Kingdom) Applied Racing Techniques	208	(United Kingdom) Peter Wardle	Surtees TS15	Ford BDA Swindon 1.6 L4	9–10, 12–13
(United Kingdom) Dicksons of Perth	707	(United Kingdom) Norman Dickson	Modus M3	Ford BDA Nicholson 1.6 L4	1

== Results and standings ==
Rnd	Track	Date	Laps	Pole position	Fastest lap	Race winner	Constructor
1	Mallory Park	March 21	50	(United Kingdom) David Purley	(United Kingdom) David Purley	(United Kingdom) David Purley	Chevron
2	Snetterton	March 28	40	(Canada) John Cannon	(United Kingdom) Damien Magee	(United Kingdom) Damien Magee	March
3	Oulton Park	April 16	50	(United Kingdom) Damien Magee	(United Kingdom) Damien Magee	(United Kingdom) Damien Magee	March
4	Brands Hatch	April 19	60	(Australia) Alan Jones	(Australia) Alan Jones	(Australia) Alan Jones	Lola
5	Thruxton	May 31	30	(United Kingdom) David Purley	(United Kingdom) David Purley	(United Kingdom) David Purley	Chevron
6	Brands Hatch	June 20	50	(United Kingdom) Guy Edwards	(United Kingdom) David Purley	(United Kingdom) David Purley	Chevron
7	Mallory Park	June 27	40	(United Kingdom) David Purley	(United Kingdom) David Purley	(United Kingdom) David Purley	Chevron
8	Snetterton	August 1	30	(United Kingdom) Keith Holland	(United Kingdom) David Purley	(United Kingdom) Ray Mallock	March
9	Brands Hatch	August 30	35	(United Kingdom) David Purley	(United Kingdom) David Purley	(United Kingdom) David Purley	Chevron
10	Thruxton	September 12	30	(Australia) Brian McGuire	(Australia) Brian McGuire	(Australia) Brian McGuire	Williams
11	Oulton Park	September 18	40	(United Kingdom) Guy Edwards	(United Kingdom) Guy Edwards	(United Kingdom) Guy Edwards	Brabham
12	Brands Hatch	October 24	24	(United Kingdom) Keith Holland	(United Kingdom) Derek Bell	(United Kingdom) Keith Holland	Lola
13	Brands Hatch	November 7	30	(United States) Eddie Cheever	(United Kingdom) David Purley	(United Kingdom) David Purley	Chevron

=== Drivers' standings ===
Points are awarded to the top ten classified finishers using the following structure:

Position	1st	2nd	3rd	4th	5th	6th	7th	8th	9th	10th	FL
Points	20	15	12	10	8	6	4	3	2	1	2

Pos.	Driver	MAL (United Kingdom)	SNE (United Kingdom)	OUL (United Kingdom)	BRH (United Kingdom)	THR (United Kingdom)	BRH (United Kingdom)	MAL (United Kingdom)	SNE (United Kingdom)	BRH (United Kingdom)	THR (United Kingdom)	OUL (United Kingdom)	BRH (United Kingdom)	BRH (United Kingdom)	Pts
1	(United Kingdom) David Purley	1	4	4	2	1	1	1	6	1	Ret	5	8	1	188
2	(United Kingdom) Damien Magee	2	1	1	3	NC	2	Ret	Ret	4	2	Ret			111
3	(United Kingdom) Keith Holland			2	8	6	Ret	2	4	Ret	6	3	1	5	95
4	(United Kingdom) Divina Galica	7	6	Ret	NC	4	6	4	5	9	7	6	13	10	57
5	(United Kingdom) Mike Wilds					3	4	Ret	2	19	5			6	51
6	(United Kingdom) Richard Scott	3	NC	3	7		9	Ret	3	14	Ret				45
7	(United Kingdom) Valentino Musetti	NC	Ret	6	11	8	Ret	3	13	Ret	3	4	Ret	15	43
8	(Australia) Brian McGuire		Ret	Ret	Ret	Ret	3	DNQ	Ret	Ret	1	DNS	Ret		34
9	(United Kingdom) Guy Edwards						Ret					1	5		30
10	(United Kingdom) Richard Robarts	Ret							8	17			2	3	30
11	(United Kingdom) Brian Henton										Ret	2	3		27
12	(United Kingdom) Derek Bell												4	2	27
13	(United States) Bill Gubelmann	5	2	Ret		7		Ret							27
14	(United Kingdom) Ray Mallock	Ret	DNS						1	13	Ret		6	DNS	26
15	(Spain) Emilio de Villota	DNS	5	Ret	10		5	10	DNS	18	8		10	7	26
16	(Australia) Alan Jones			Ret	1										22
17	(United States) Eddie Cheever									3				4	22
18	(United States) Tony Rouff		3					5		11			11	9	22
19	(New Zealand) John Nicholson					2			7	12	Ret		Ret	Ret	21
20	(United Kingdom) Norman Dickson	6		Ret	6		NC	6	NC	Ret	15				18
21	(United Kingdom) Bob Evans									2	Ret				15
22	(United Kingdom) Andy Sutcliffe									7	4				14
23	(United Kingdom) Jeremy Rossiter			7	5					Ret					12
24	(United Kingdom) Jim Crawford			5	Ret	DNS								8	11
25	(United Kingdom) Dennis Leech					5	Ret	DNQ	9	23	10	Ret		13	11
26	(United Kingdom) John Wingfield	4		Ret	Ret					15	Ret				10
27	(Canada) John Cannon	Ret	Ret	DNS	4										10
28	(Finland) Mika Arpiainen									5					8
29	(Austria) Hans Binder									6					6
30	(United Kingdom) Brian Robinson	Ret	NC	8	NC	NC	8	DNQ		Ret			16		6
31	(Belgium) Bernard de Dryver								10	DNQ	9	10	9	12	6
32	(United Kingdom) Ken Bailey							8		22		9			5
33	(United Kingdom) Phil Sharpe						7	11	11						4
34	(United Kingdom) Ian Grob									Ret			7	14	4
35	(United Kingdom) Phil Dowsett							7		21					4
36	(United Kingdom) Andy Barton			Ret				12				7			4
37	(Republic of Ireland) Alo Lawler			9			Ret	9							4
38	(United Kingdom) Cyd Williams				Ret							8		DNQ	3
39	(United Kingdom) John Calvert	8		DNS											3
40	(Australia) Bob Muir									8					3
41	(Republic of Ireland) Jim Kelly					9	10	DNQ	12	Ret					3
42	(Italy) Lella Lombardi			NC	9										2
43	(United Kingdom) Bob Howlings	Ret		10											1
44	(United States) Ted Wentz									10					1
—	(United Kingdom) Peter Wardle									16	11		DNS	11	0
—	(United Kingdom) Chris Featherstone	NC	NC	NC	Ret	Ret	11	DNQ	14	NC	14		17		0
—	(United Kingdom) Mike King						12			Ret	12	Ret	DNS		0
—	(United Kingdom) Geoff Friswell											DNS	12	Ret	0
—	(United Kingdom) Derrick Worthington								Ret		13	Ret			0
—	(Spain) José Maria de Uriarte									24			14	NC	0
—	(United Kingdom) Nick May												15	Ret	0
—	(United Kingdom) Allan Kayes								Ret		16	DSQ		DNQ	0
—	(United Kingdom) Roy Baker					DNS			Ret	DNS	Ret		18		0
—	(Mexico) Philip Guerola				12	NC	NC	DNQ					19	DNS	0
—	(United Kingdom) Tony Trimmer									20					0
—	(Republic of Ireland) Martin Birrane						DNQ			25			DNS		0
—	(United Kingdom) Chris Choat					NC	DNQ				DNS		Ret		0
—	(United Kingdom) John Bowtell					Ret	NC	DNQ							0
—	(United Kingdom) Jeremy Sumner					NC					DNS				0
—	(United Kingdom) Adrian Russell									DNQ	NC				0
—	(United Kingdom) Derek Cook							Ret			DNS	Ret	Ret		0
—	(Australia) Terry Perkins							Ret			Ret				0
—	(Italy) Luigi-Mimmo Cevasco	Ret													0
—	(United Kingdom) David Winstanley			Ret											0
—	(United Kingdom) John Tait					DNS	DNQ	DNQ							0
—	(United Kingdom) Roger Springett	DNS													0
—	(Austria) Karl Oppitzhauser									DNQ					0
Pos	Driver	MAL (United Kingdom)	SNE (United Kingdom)	OUL (United Kingdom)	BRH (United Kingdom)	THR (United Kingdom)	BRH (United Kingdom)	MAL (United Kingdom)	SNE (United Kingdom)	BRH (United Kingdom)	THR (United Kingdom)	OUL (United Kingdom)	BRH (United Kingdom)	BRH (United Kingdom)	Pts
