= 1977 Shellsport International Series =

Motor racing championship

Seasons
- ← 1976 1978 →

The 1977 Shellsport International Series was a Formula Libre motor racing championship held in the United Kingdom, the series ran F1, F2, F5000 and Formula Atlantic cars in the same race. The second Shellsport International Series was contested over 14 rounds. The season started on 13 March and ended on 16 October. The Drivers' Championship was won by Englishman Tony Trimmer. The season was marred by the death of Brian McGuire during a practice session for round 11 at Brands Hatch. It was the last season of the Shellsport International Series. For 1978, the series would become the British Formula One series.

== Teams and drivers ==
Entry List
Team	No.	Driver	Chassis	Engine	Rounds
Formula 1
(United Kingdom) Hexagon Racing	1	(United Kingdom) Nick May	Penske PC3	Ford Cosworth DFV 3.0 V8	2
(United Kingdom) Hexagon Racing	1	(United Kingdom) Derek Bell	Penske PC3	Ford Cosworth DFV 3.0 V8	3-4, 6, 9-11
(United Kingdom) Hexagon Racing	1	(United Kingdom) Brian Henton	Penske PC3	Ford Cosworth DFV 3.0 V8	14
(United Kingdom) Melchester Racing	2	(United Kingdom) Tony Trimmer	Surtees TS19	Ford Cosworth DFV 3.0 V8	All
(United Kingdom) RAM Racing	4	(United Kingdom) Guy Edwards	March 75A/761	Ford Cosworth DFV 3.0 V8	9-14
(Australia) Brian McGuire	6	(Australia) Brian McGuire	McGuire BM1	Ford Cosworth DFV 3.0 V8	1-8, 10-11
(United Kingdom) Derek Cook	10	(United Kingdom) Derek Cook	Hesketh 308C	Ford Cosworth DFV 3.0 V8	3-6
(United Kingdom) ShellSport Whiting	13	(United Kingdom) Divina Galica	Surtees TS19	Ford Cosworth DFV 3.0 V8	1-3, 5-14
(Spain) Iberia Airlines	14	(Spain) Emilio de Villota	Lyncar 006	Ford Cosworth DFV 3.0 V8	1-4
(Spain) Iberia Airlines	14	(Spain) Emilio de Villota	McLaren M23	Ford Cosworth DFV 3.0 V8	9, 11, 13
(Spain) Iberia Airlines	14	(Spain) Emilio de Villota	McLaren M25	Ford Cosworth DFV 3.0 V8	14
(United Kingdom) David Prophet Ltd	29	(United Kingdom) David Prophet	Surtees TS16	Ford Cosworth DFV 3.0 V8	5-7
(Spain) Escuderia Arym	80	(Spain) Hermann Hengstenberg	Lyncar 006	Ford Cosworth DFV 3.0 V8	13-14
(Netherlands) F & S Racing	82	(Netherlands) Boy Hayje	March 761	Ford Cosworth DFV 3.0 V8	14
Formula 2
(United Kingdom) Graham Eden Racing	15	(United Kingdom) Nick May	Sana RD9	Ford BDG Eden 2.0 L4	1
(United Kingdom) Graham Eden Racing	15	(United States) Tony Rouff	Sana RD9	Ford BDG Eden 2.0 L4	2
(United Kingdom) Graham Eden Racing	15	(United States) Tony Rouff	Ralt RT1/77	Ford BDG Eden 2.0 L4	5-14
(United Kingdom) Richard Robarts	9	(United Kingdom) Richard Robarts	March 762	Hart 420R 2.0 L4	4
(United Kingdom) Boxer Cars	8	(United States) Danny Sullivan	Boxer PR276	Hart 420R 2.0 L4	10-11
(United Kingdom) Derek Cook	10	(United Kingdom) Derek Cook	Chevron B27	Ford BDG Smith 2.0 L4	1-2
(United Kingdom) MacLaren's of Broxburn	11	(United Kingdom) Iain McLaren	Chevron B35	Ford BDX 2.0 L4	1, 3, 5
(United Kingdom) ICI Newsweek/Chevron	12	(United Kingdom) Ray Mallock	Chevron B40	Hart 420R 2.0 L4	11
(United Kingdom) Shellsport Whiting	13	(United Kingdom) Divina Galica	March 742	Ford BDX Swindon 2.0 L4	4
(Argentina) Pablo Brea	16	(France) Hervé Leguellec	March 762	Ford BDX 2.0 L4	3-4, 6
(United Kingdom) Roger Heavens Racing	16	(France) Hervé Leguellec	March 762	Ford BDX 2.0 L4	5
(United Kingdom) Roger Heavens Racing	16	(United Kingdom) Adrian Russell	March 762	Ford BDX 2.0 L4	13-14
(Republic of Ireland) L & B Excavations	17	(Republic of Ireland) Alo Lawler	Lola T462	Ford BDX 2.0 L4	1-3, 5-6, 8-14
(United Kingdom) Dicksons of Perth	20	(United Kingdom) Norman Dickson	March 772	BMW M12 2.0 L4	1-3, 5-6, 8, 11-14
(United Kingdom) Andy Barton	23	(United Kingdom) Andy Barton	Chevron B35	Ford BDA 2.0 L4	1, 3
(Mexico) Philip Guerola	30	(Mexico) Philip Guerola	Wimhurst LP2	Ford Cosworth FVC 1.8 L4	4-7
(United Kingdom) John Brown Wheels	36	(United Kingdom) John Morrison	Lola T360	Ford BDG Richardson 2.0 L4	5-6
(United Kingdom) Kim Mather	37	(United Kingdom) Kim Mather	Chevron B35D	Ford BDA Richardson 2.0 L4	3, 8-9, 14
(United Kingdom) Adrian Russell	38	(United Kingdom) Adrian Russell	Lola T450	Ford BDX 2.0 L4	3, 7, 9-12
(United Kingdom) John Ravenscroft	43	(United Kingdom) John Ravenscroft	Surtees TS15	Ford BDA Hart 2.0 L4	11-14
(United States) Fred Opert Racing	44	(United States) Gregg Young	Chevron B40	Hart 420R 2.0 L4	11
(United States) Fred Opert Racing	45	(United States) Wink Bancroft	Chevron B40	Hart 420R 2.0 L4	11-12
(United Kingdom) John Tait	65	(United Kingdom) John Tait	Brabham BT36	Ford Cosworth FVC 1.8 L4	12-14
(United Kingdom) Alan Baillie	78	(United Kingdom) Alan Baillie	March 752	Ford BDX Swindon 2.0 L4	12
Formula 5000
(United Kingdom) E. L. Gibbs Racing	3	(United Kingdom) Keith Holland	Lola T332C	Chevrolet 5.0 V8	1-7
(United Kingdom) E. L. Gibbs Racing	5	(United Kingdom) Damien Magee	Lola T332C	Chevrolet 5.0 V8	10-14
(United Kingdom) Charles Clowes Racing	3	(United Kingdom) Bob Evans	Chevron B30	Ford GAA 3.4 V6	7
(United Kingdom) RAM Racing	4	(United Kingdom) Guy Edwards	March 75A/761	Ford GAA 3.4 V6	1-8
(United Kingdom) David Price Racing	7	(United Kingdom) Valentino Musetti	March 752	Ford GAA 3.4 V6	1-10, 14
(Republic of Ireland) Jim Kelly	18	(Republic of Ireland) Jim Kelly	Trojan T101	Chevrolet 5.0 V8	2-4, 12, 14
(United Kingdom) John Jordan	19	(Denmark) Tom Belsø	Lola T330	Chevrolet 5.0 V8	1-10
(United Kingdom) Aim Racing with Templar Tillers	24	(United Kingdom) Mike Wilds	Chevron B30	Ford GAA 3.4 V6	11, 13-14
(United Kingdom) Chris Featherstone	25	(United Kingdom) Chris Featherstone	McRae GM1	Chevrolet 5.0 V8	1
(United Kingdom) Chris Featherstone	25	(United Kingdom) Keith Holland	McRae GM1	Chevrolet 5.0 V8	11-14
(United Kingdom) Robin Smith	32	(United Kingdom) Robin Smith	Lola T330	Chevrolet 5.0 V8	2-6, 8, 10-14
(United Kingdom) Don Gray	34	(United Kingdom) Don Gray	Chevron B24	Chevrolet 5.0 V8	4, 7, 11
(United Kingdom) Evan Clements	39	(United Kingdom) Evan Clements	Chevron B30	Ford GAA 3.4 V6	6
(Australia) Bruce Allison	62	(Australia) Bruce Allison	Chevron B37	Chevrolet 5.0 V8	2-9, 12-14
(United Kingdom) Allan Kayes	75	(United Kingdom) Allan Kayes	Lola T330	Chevrolet 5.0 V8	1, 4-6
(United Kingdom) Allan Kayes	75	(United Kingdom) Allan Kayes	Lola T400	Chevrolet 5.0 V8	7
(United Kingdom) Dennis Leech	77	(United Kingdom) Dennis Leech	Chevron B28	Chevrolet 5.0 V8	8, 10-12
Formula Atlantic
(Republic of Ireland) Martin Birrane	26	(Republic of Ireland) Martin Birrane	Chevron B29	Ford BDA 1.6 L4	11
(Australia) Rob Moffat	28	(Australia) Rob Moffat	March 73B	Ford BDA 1.6 L4	1-2
(Australia) Rob Moffat	28	(Australia) Rob Moffat	March 73B/74B	Ford BDA 1.6 L4	6, 10-12
(United Kingdom) H. A. Rose	42	(United Kingdom) Howard Rose	March 753/76B	Ford BDA 1.6 L4	10-12, 14
(United Kingdom) Conoco Jet Racing	66	(United Kingdom) Kevin Bowditch	Lyncar 005	Ford BDA 1.6 L4	8-10
(United Kingdom) Terry Fisher	64	(United Kingdom) Terry Fisher	GRD 372	Ford BDA 1.6 L4	11
(United Kingdom) John Bowtell	76	(United Kingdom) John Bowtell	March 74B	Ford BDA 1.6 L4	9, 12

== Results and standings ==
Rnd	Track	Date	Laps	Pole position	Fastest lap	Race winner	Constructor
1	Mallory Park	March 13	50	(United Kingdom) Tony Trimmer	(Spain) Emilio de Villota	(Spain) Emilio de Villota	Lyncar
2	Snetterton	March 27	40	(United Kingdom) Guy Edwards	(United Kingdom) Guy Edwards	(United Kingdom) Guy Edwards	March
3	Oulton Park	April 8	50	(United Kingdom) Guy Edwards	(United Kingdom) Derek Bell	(United Kingdom) Derek Bell	Penske
4	Brands Hatch	April 11	60	(United Kingdom) Valentino Musetti	(United Kingdom) Valentino Musetti (United Kingdom) Tony Trimmer	(United Kingdom) Valentino Musetti	March
5	Mallory Park	May 22	40	(United Kingdom) Tony Trimmer	(United Kingdom) Tony Trimmer	(United Kingdom) Tony Trimmer	Surtees
6	Thruxton	June 6	35	(Australia) Bruce Allison	(United Kingdom) Valentino Musetti	(United States) Tony Rouff	Ralt
7	Brands Hatch	June 26	60	(Australia) Bruce Allison	(Australia) Bruce Allison	(United Kingdom) Tony Trimmer	Surtees
8	Oulton Park	July 9	40	(United Kingdom) Tony Trimmer	(United Kingdom) Tony Trimmer	(United Kingdom) Tony Trimmer	Surtees
9	Mallory Park	July 24	50	(United Kingdom) Valentino Musetti	(Spain) Emilio de Villota	(Spain) Emilio de Villota	McLaren
10	Donington Park	July 31	40	(United Kingdom) Tony Trimmer	(United Kingdom) Tony Trimmer (United Kingdom) Divina Galica	(United Kingdom) Tony Trimmer	Surtees
11	Brands Hatch	August 29	40	(United Kingdom) Tony Trimmer	(United Kingdom) Tony Trimmer (United Kingdom) Divina Galica	(Spain) Emilio de Villota	McLaren
12	Thruxton	September 11	35	(Australia) Bruce Allison	(United Kingdom) Tony Trimmer	(United Kingdom) Guy Edwards	March
13	Snetterton	October 2	40	(United Kingdom) Guy Edwards	(United Kingdom) Guy Edwards (United Kingdom) Tony Trimmer	(United Kingdom) Tony Trimmer	Surtees
14	Brands Hatch	October 16	40	(United Kingdom) Tony Trimmer	(United Kingdom) Tony Trimmer	(United Kingdom) Guy Edwards	March

=== Drivers' standings ===
Points are awarded to the top ten classified finishers using the following structure:

Position	1st	2nd	3rd	4th	5th	6th	7th	8th	9th	10th	FL
Points	20	15	12	10	8	6	4	3	2	1	2

Pos.	Driver	MAL (United Kingdom)	SNE (United Kingdom)	OUL (United Kingdom)	BRH (United Kingdom)	MAL (United Kingdom)	THR (United Kingdom)	BRH (United Kingdom)	OUL (United Kingdom)	MAL (United Kingdom)	DON (United Kingdom)	BRH (United Kingdom)	THR (United Kingdom)	SNE (United Kingdom)	BRH (United Kingdom)	Pts
1	(United Kingdom) Tony Trimmer	3	5	Ret	Ret	1	Ret	1	1	2	1	2	Ret	1	2	181
2	(United Kingdom) Guy Edwards	NC	1	Ret	3	5	2	2	2	Ret	Ret	Ret	1	Ret	1	129
3	(United Kingdom) Valentino Musetti	5	NC	3	1	2	9	3	Ret	Ret	3				DNS	85
4	(United States) Tony Rouff		6			6	1	4	3	4	9	6	DNS	5	Ret	80
5	(Spain) Emilio de Villota	1	Ret	DNS	DNS					1		1		3	Ret	76
6	(United Kingdom) Divina Galica	DNS	2	Ret	Ret	Ret	Ret	Ret	4	3	2	3	Ret	DNS	6	74
7	(Australia) Bruce Allison		Ret	2	2	3	8	Ret	Ret	DNS			2	Ret	4	72
8	(United Kingdom) Keith Holland	2	4	Ret	6	4	3	Ret				4	Ret	Ret	NC	63
9	(United Kingdom) Norman Dickson	7	Ret	DNS		7	4		Ret			7	3	4	5	52
10	(Denmark) Tom Belsø	4	3	Ret	Ret	10	Ret	6	DNS	5	5					45
11	(United Kingdom) Derek Bell			1	4		Ret			DSQ	4	DNS				42
12	(Republic of Ireland) Alo Lawler	6	8	Ret		Ret	7		6	6	Ret	9	5	6	Ret	41
13	(United Kingdom) Robin Smith		7	4	DNS	8	10		NC		8	11	DNS	Ret	Ret	21
14	(United Kingdom) Damien Magee										DNS	Ret	Ret	2	8	18
15	(France) Hervé Le Guellec			8	5	DNQ	6									17
16	(United Kingdom) Brian Henton														3	12
16	(United Kingdom) Kim Mather			6					Ret	7					9	12
18	(United States) Wink Bancroft											10	4			11
18	(United Kingdom) Don Gray				8			5				Ret				11
20	(United Kingdom) Iain McLaren	9		5		DNS										10
20	(United Kingdom) Dennis Leech								DNS		7	Ret	6			10
22	(United Kingdom) Adrian Russell			DNS				DNS		NC	Ret	12	7	7	10	9
23	(United Kingdom) Derek Cook	NC	Ret	Ret	Ret	Ret	5									8
23	(Australia) Brian McGuire	Ret	DNS	Ret	Ret	Ret	Ret	Ret	5		Ret	DNS				8
23	(United Kingdom) Ray Mallock											5				8
26	(United Kingdom) Allan Kayes	DNS			7	12	DNS	7								8
27	(United Kingdom) Andy Barton	8		7												7
28	(United States) Danny Sullivan										6	Ret				6
29	(United Kingdom) Mike Wilds											DNS		NC	7	4
29	(Republic of Ireland) Jim Kelly		9	9	Ret								NC		Ret	4
31	(United Kingdom) Kevin Bowditch								NC	8	DNS					3
31	(United States) Gregg Young											8				3
33	(United Kingdom) John Bowtell									9			Ret			2
33	(United Kingdom) David Prophet					9	DNS	DNS								2
—	(Mexico) Philip Guerola				NC	DNQ	11	NC								0
—	(United Kingdom) John Morrison					11	Ret									0
—	(United Kingdom) Evan Clements						12									0
—	(Australia) Rob Moffat	NC	DNS				NC				NC	NC	Ret			0
—	(United Kingdom) John Ravenscroft											NC	Ret	NC	NC	0
—	(United Kingdom) John Tait												NC	NC	Ret	0
—	(United Kingdom) Nick May	NC	DNS													0
—	(United Kingdom) Howard Rose										DNQ	Ret	Ret		Ret	0
—	(Republic of Ireland) Martin Birrane											Ret				0
—	(United Kingdom) Alan Baillie												Ret			0
—	(United Kingdom) Richard Robarts				DSQ											0
—	(Spain) Hermann Hengstenberg													DNS	DNS	0
—	(United Kingdom) Chris Featherstone	DNS														0
—	(United Kingdom) Bob Evans							DNS								0
—	(United Kingdom) Terry Fisher											DNS				0
—	(Netherlands) Boy Hayje														DNS	0
Pos.	Driver	MAL (United Kingdom)	SNE (United Kingdom)	OUL (United Kingdom)	BRH (United Kingdom)	MAL (United Kingdom)	THR (United Kingdom)	BRH (United Kingdom)	OUL (United Kingdom)	MAL (United Kingdom)	DON (United Kingdom)	BRH (United Kingdom)	THR (United Kingdom)	SNE (United Kingdom)	BRH (United Kingdom)	Pts
