= Surtees TS16 =

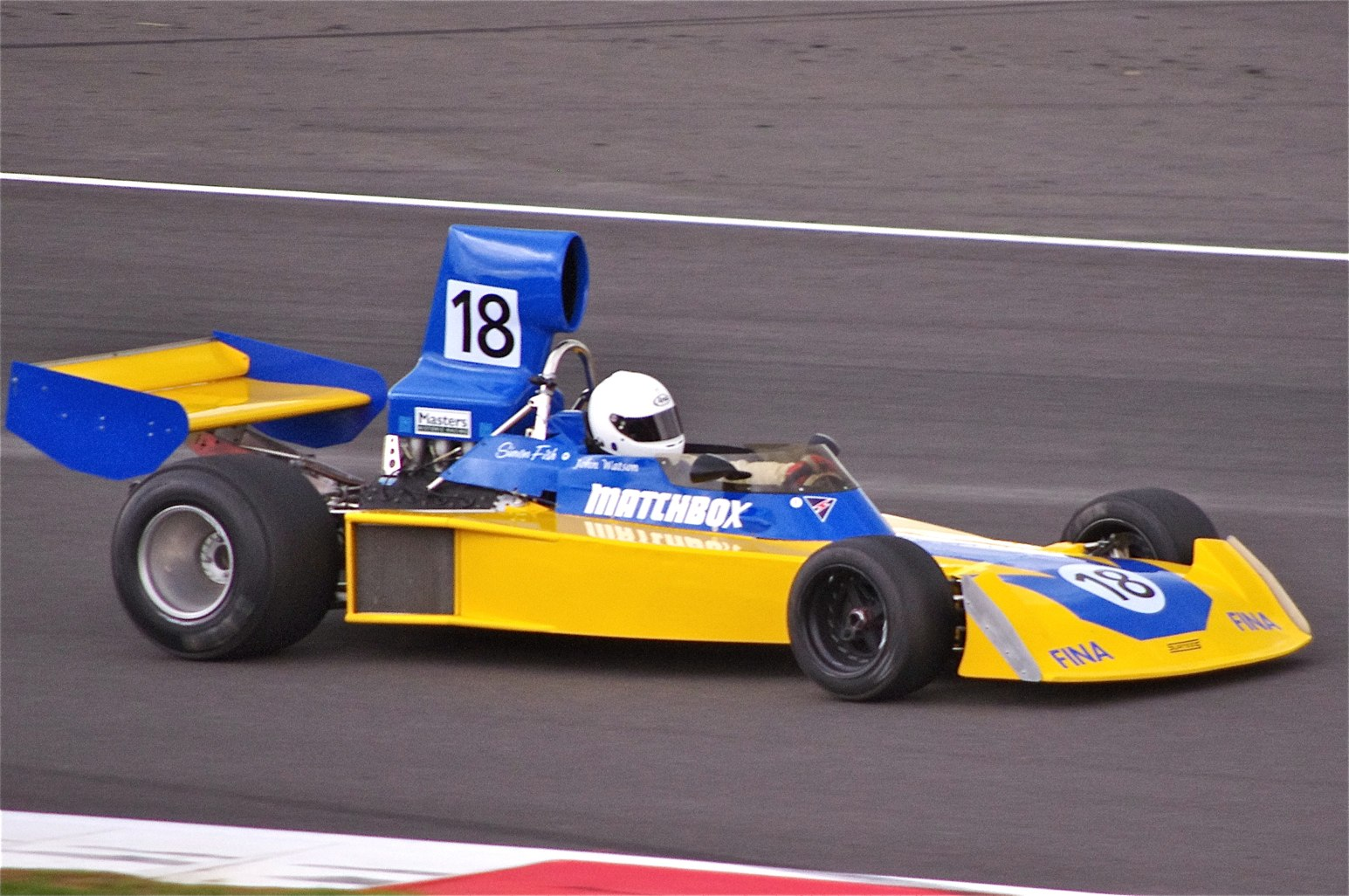
- 1974 Surtees TS16 at Silverstone Classic in 2011.
- Category: Formula One
- Constructor: Surtees
- Designer: John Surtees
- Predecessor: Surtees TS14
- Successor: Surtees TS19

Technical specifications
- Chassis: Aluminium alloy monocoque
- Engine: Ford Cosworth DFV 2,993 cc (182.6 cu in) V8 naturally aspirated Mid-engine, longitudinally mounted
- Transmission: Hewland FG 400 5-speed manual
- Tyres: 1974: Firestone; 1975–1976: Goodyear

Competition history
- Notable entrants: Team Surtees; Bang & Olufsen Team Surtees; Memphis International Team Surtees; Team Surtees with National Organs; AAW Racing; Shell Sport/Whiting
- Notable drivers: (Brazil) José Carlos Pace (Germany) Jochen Mass (United Kingdom) Derek Bell (France) Jean-Pierre Jabouille (United Kingdom) John Watson
- Debut: 1974 Argentine Grand Prix
| Races | Wins | Poles | F/Laps |
|---|---|---|---|
| 26 | 0 | 0 | 0 |
- Unless otherwise stated, all data refer to Formula One World Championship Grands Prix only.

The Surtees TS16 was a Formula One car used by Surtees during the 1974, 1975 and 1976 Formula One seasons. It was designed by John Surtees.

== Racing history ==
=== 1974–1975: Surtees ===
The first race of the 1974 season was the 1974 Argentine Grand Prix. Surtees entered two cars for Brazilian José Carlos Pace and German Jochen Mass but both drivers retired, Pace with suspension failure and Mass with engine failure. At Brazil, the Brazilian finished fourth and the German was 17th, The South African Grand Prix saw Pace finish 11th and Mass retire with suspension failure. At Spain the Brazilian finished 13th and the German retired with a broken gearbox. Both drivers retired at the Belgian Grand Prix, Pace with a bad handling car and Mass with suspension failure. at Monaco Mass did not start and Pace was involved in a collision towards Massenet with Jean-Pierre Beltoise (BRM), Denny Hulme (McLaren), Arturo Merzario (Iso–Marlboro), Vittorio Brambilla (March Engineering), Brian Redman (Shadow) and Tim Schenken (Trojan). Both drivers retired at the Swedish Grand Prix, Pace with a bad handling car and Mass with suspension failure. Pace parted company with the team after the race, falling out with team boss and designer, John Surtees. The team only entered Mass for Holland who retired with transmission failure. Mass retired with clutch failure at the French Grand Prix and new teammate José Dolhem disappointed the home crowd by failing to qualify. Dolhem was replaced at the Britain by Englishman Derek Bell but he disappointed the home crowd by failing to qualify and the German finished 14th. The German Grand Prix saw Bell 11th and Mass retire with engine failure, disappointing his home crowd. Mass was replaced by Frenchman Jean-Pierre Jabouille for Austria but he and the Englishman failed to qualify. The team also entered Austrian Dieter Quester who finished ninth. Dolhem and Bell failed to qualify for the Italian Grand Prix. Dolhem was replaced by Austrian Helmut Koinigg for Canada who finished tenth but Bell failed to qualify. Bell was replaced by Dolhem for the United States Grand Prix who withdrew on lap twenty five after Koinigg crashed on lap ten probably due to a deflating rear tire. On impact with the Armco barrier, the bottom rail gave way but the top one did not, and Koinigg had no chance and was decapitated. Surtees ended the season in 11th with three points but low on money for 1975, the team pared back to a single car for Englishman John Watson.

The first race of 1975 was the 1975 Argentine Grand Prix and Watson was stranded with a loose fuel-pipe and was disqualified after attempting trackside repairs. At Brazil the Englishman finished tenth. Watson retired with Clutch failure at the South African Grand Prix. The Englishman finished Eighth at Spain. Watson Spun off at the Monaco Grand Prix. The Englishman finished tenth at Belgian. Watson finished 16th at the Swedish Grand Prix. The Englishman retired with Vibrations at Holland. Watson finished 16th at the French Grand Prix. At Britain the Englishman finished 11th After he, Patrick Depailler (Tyrrell) and Mark Donohue, (Penske entered (March) went off at Stowe, The team also entered Dave Morgan who finished 18th After he, Wilson Fittipaldi (Fittipaldi), John Nicholson (Lyncar), Brian Henton, (Lotus), Tony Brise (Hill), Carlos Pace (Brabham), Jody Scheckter (Tyrrell) and James Hunt (Hesketh) went off at Club. The team skipped Germany and Raced at Austria with Watson and finished tenth. After the race was there was discussion between the Grand Prix Drivers' Association and the race officials as to whether the race should continue-it was brought to a halt on lap 29 due to rain. The Team skipped the Italian and United States Grand Prix to focus on 1976 and the TS16 was replaced by the Surtees TS19

=== 1974: AAW Racing ===
Antti Aarnio-Wihuri formed AAW Racing Team and bought a TS16 from Surtees, He hired Finnish driver Leo Kinnunen who was entered at the 1974 Belgian Grand Prix but failed to qualify. It was next entered in Sweden and the Finnish driver retired with engine failure. It was entered for the French and British Grand Prix and both times Kinnunen failed to qualify. It was finally entered in Austria and Italy and both times the Finnish driver failed to qualify. Lack of funding then forced the team to retire from Formula One.

=== 1976: Shell Sport/Whiting ===
Shellsport/Whiting was a team formed by Nick Whiting and using Shell fuel. The Team bought a TS16 for Divina Galica to drive at the British Grand Prix where she failed to qualify.

== Complete Formula One World Championship results ==
(key)

| Year | Entrant | Engines | Tyres | Drivers | 1 | 2 | 3 | 4 | 5 | 6 | 7 | 8 | 9 | 10 | 11 | 12 | 13 | 14 | 15 | 16 | Points | WCC |
|---|---|---|---|---|---|---|---|---|---|---|---|---|---|---|---|---|---|---|---|---|---|---|
| 1974 | Team Surtees; Bang & Olufsen Team Surtees | Ford Cosworth DFV 3.0 V8 | F | | ARG | BRA | RSA | ESP | BEL | MON | SWE | NED | FRA | GBR | GER | AUT | ITA | CAN | USA | | 3 | 11th |
| 1974 | Team Surtees; Bang & Olufsen Team Surtees | Ford Cosworth DFV 3.0 V8 | F | José Carlos Pace | Ret | 4 | 11 | 13 | Ret | Ret | Ret | | | | | | | | | | 3 | 11th |
| 1974 | Team Surtees; Bang & Olufsen Team Surtees | Ford Cosworth DFV 3.0 V8 | F | Jochen Mass | Ret | 17 | Ret | Ret | Ret | DNS | Ret | Ret | Ret | 14 | Ret | | | | | | 3 | 11th |
| 1974 | Team Surtees; Bang & Olufsen Team Surtees | Ford Cosworth DFV 3.0 V8 | F | Derek Bell | | | | | | | | | | DNQ | 11 | DNQ | DNQ | DNQ | | | 3 | 11th |
| 1974 | Team Surtees; Bang & Olufsen Team Surtees | Ford Cosworth DFV 3.0 V8 | F | José Dolhem | | | | | | | | | DNQ | | | | DNQ | | Ret | | 3 | 11th |
| 1974 | Team Surtees; Bang & Olufsen Team Surtees | Ford Cosworth DFV 3.0 V8 | F | Jean-Pierre Jabouille | | | | | | | | | | | | DNQ | | | | | 3 | 11th |
| 1974 | Team Surtees; Bang & Olufsen Team Surtees | Ford Cosworth DFV 3.0 V8 | F | Helmut Koinigg | | | | | | | | | | | | | | 10 | Ret | | 3 | 11th |
| 1974 | Memphis International Team Surtees | Ford Cosworth DFV 3.0 V8 | F | Dieter Quester | | | | | | | | | | | | 9 | | | | | 3 | 11th |
| 1974 | AAW Racing | Ford Cosworth DFV 3.0 V8 | F | Leo Kinnunen | | | | | DNQ | | Ret | | DNQ | DNQ | | DNQ | DNQ | | | | 3 | 11th |
| 1975 | Team Surtees | Ford Cosworth DFV 3.0 V8 | G | | ARG | BRA | RSA | ESP | MON | BEL | SWE | NED | FRA | GBR | GER | AUT | ITA | USA | | | 0 | NC |
| 1975 | Team Surtees | Ford Cosworth DFV 3.0 V8 | G | John Watson | DSQ | 10 | Ret | 8 | Ret | 10 | 16 | Ret | 13 | 11 | | 10 | | | | | 0 | NC |
| 1975 | Team Surtees with National Organs | Ford Cosworth DFV 3.0 V8 | G | Dave Morgan | | | | | | | | | | 18 | | | | | | | 0 | NC |
| 1976 | Shellsport/ Whiting | Ford Cosworth DFV 3.0 V8 | G | | BRA | RSA | USW | ESP | BEL | MON | SWE | FRA | GBR | GER | AUT | NED | ITA | CAN | USA | JPN | 7 | 10th |
| 1976 | Shellsport/ Whiting | Ford Cosworth DFV 3.0 V8 | G | Divina Galica | | | | | | | | | DNQ | | | | | | | | 7 | 10th |

== Non-championship results ==
(key)

| Year | Entrant | Engine | Tyres | Drivers | 1 | 2 | 3 |
|---|---|---|---|---|---|---|---|
| 1974 | Team Surtees; Bang & Olufsen Team Surtees | Ford Cosworth DFV 3.0 V8 | F | | PRE | ROC | INT |
| 1974 | Team Surtees; Bang & Olufsen Team Surtees | Ford Cosworth DFV 3.0 V8 | F | Jochen Mass | 4 | DNS | 2 |
| 1974 | Team Surtees; Bang & Olufsen Team Surtees | Ford Cosworth DFV 3.0 V8 | F | Carlos Pace | 9 | | |
| 1975 | Team Surtees | Ford Cosworth DFV 3.0 V8 | G | | ROC | INT | SUI |
| 1975 | Team Surtees | Ford Cosworth DFV 3.0 V8 | G | John Watson | 2 | 4 | 5 |
