= 1984 1000 km of Silverstone =

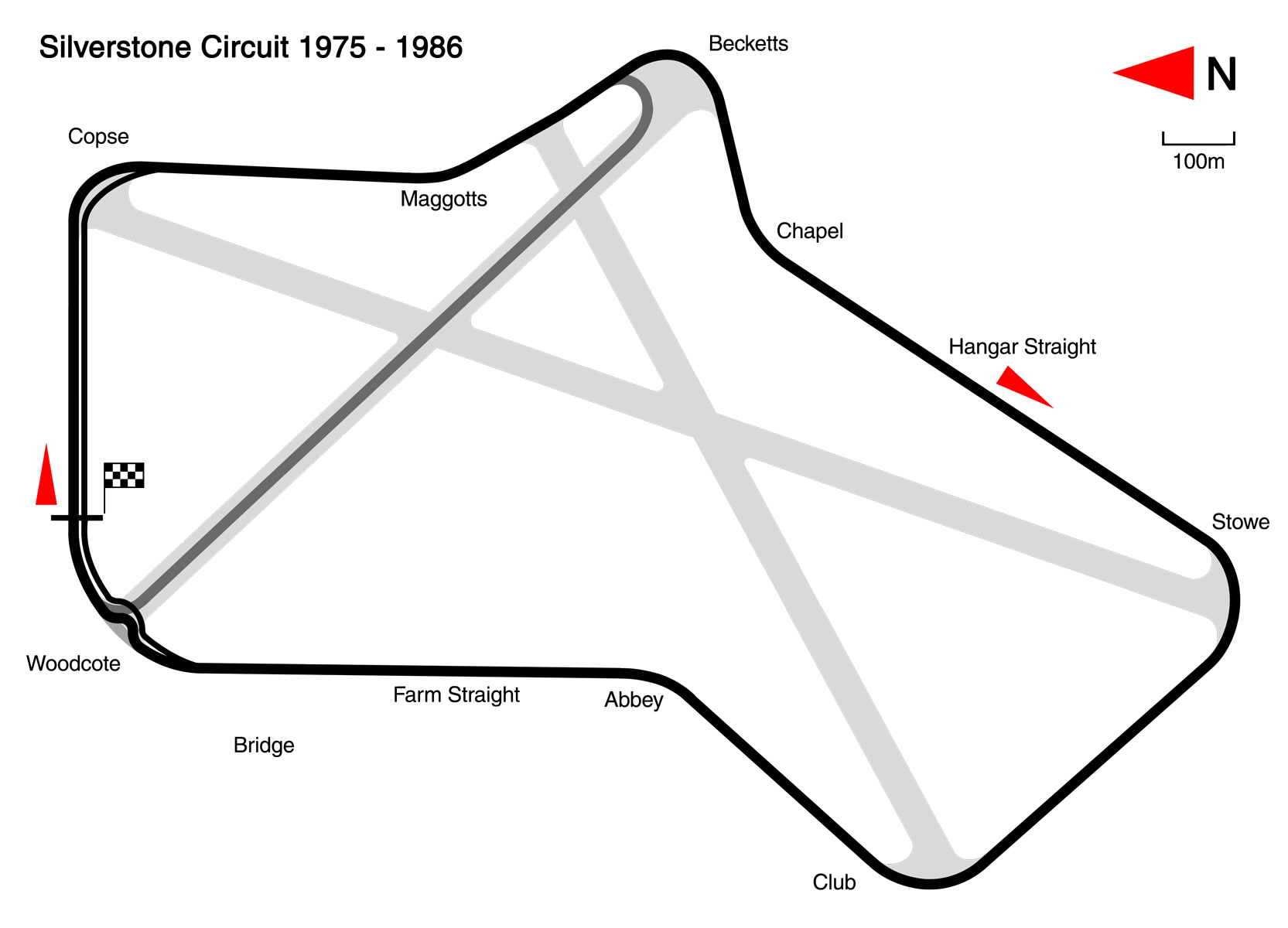
Map of the Silverstone Circuit (1975–1986)

The 1984 Grand Prix International 1000 km was the second round of the 1984 World Endurance Championship. It took place at the Silverstone Circuit, Great Britain on 13 May 1984.

== Official results ==
Class winners in bold. Cars failing to complete 75% of the winner's distance marked as Not Classified (NC).

Pos	Class	No	Team	Drivers	Chassis	Tyre	Laps
Pos	Class	No	Team	Drivers	Engine	Tyre	Laps
1	**C1**	**1**	**(Germany) Rothmans Porsche**	**(Germany) Jochen Mass (Belgium) Jacky Ickx**	**Porsche 956**	**D**	**212**
1	**C1**	**1**	**(Germany) Rothmans Porsche**	**(Germany) Jochen Mass (Belgium) Jacky Ickx**	**Porsche Type-935 2.6 L Turbo Flat-6**	**D**	**212**
2	C1	7	(Germany) New-Man Joest Racing	(Germany) Klaus Ludwig (France) Henri Pescarolo	Porsche 956	**D**	210
2	C1	7	(Germany) New-Man Joest Racing	(Germany) Klaus Ludwig (France) Henri Pescarolo	Porsche Type-935 2.6 L Turbo Flat-6	**D**	210
3	C1	55	(United Kingdom) Skoal Bandit Porsche Team (United Kingdom) John Fitzpatrick Racing	(United Kingdom) Rupert Keegan (United Kingdom) Guy Edwards	Porsche 956	**Y**	207
3	C1	55	(United Kingdom) Skoal Bandit Porsche Team (United Kingdom) John Fitzpatrick Racing	(United Kingdom) Rupert Keegan (United Kingdom) Guy Edwards	Porsche Type-935 2.6 L Turbo Flat-6	**Y**	207
4	C1	5	(Italy) Martini Racing	(Italy) Mauro Baldi (Italy) Paolo Barilla	Lancia LC2	**D**	206
4	C1	5	(Italy) Martini Racing	(Italy) Mauro Baldi (Italy) Paolo Barilla	Ferrari 308C 2.6 L Turbo V8	**D**	206
5	C1	14	(United Kingdom) GTi Engineering	(United Kingdom) Jonathan Palmer (Netherlands) Jan Lammers	Porsche 956	**D**	203
5	C1	14	(United Kingdom) GTi Engineering	(United Kingdom) Jonathan Palmer (Netherlands) Jan Lammers	Porsche Type-935 2.6 L Turbo Flat-6	**D**	203
6	C1	11	(Germany) Kremer Racing	(Austria) Franz Konrad (United Kingdom) David Sutherland	Porsche 956	**D**	202
6	C1	11	(Germany) Kremer Racing	(Austria) Franz Konrad (United Kingdom) David Sutherland	Porsche Type-935 2.6 L Turbo Flat-6	**D**	202
7	C1	6	(Italy) Jolly Club	(Italy) Beppe Gabbiani (Italy) Pierluigi Martini	Lancia LC2	**D**	201
7	C1	6	(Italy) Jolly Club	(Italy) Beppe Gabbiani (Italy) Pierluigi Martini	Ferrari 308C 2.6 L Turbo V8	**D**	201
8	C1	33	(United Kingdom) Skoal Bandit Porsche Team (United Kingdom) John Fitzpatrick Racing	(United Kingdom) David Hobbs (Belgium) Thierry Boutsen	Porsche 956	**Y**	199
8	C1	33	(United Kingdom) Skoal Bandit Porsche Team (United Kingdom) John Fitzpatrick Racing	(United Kingdom) David Hobbs (Belgium) Thierry Boutsen	Porsche Type-935 2.6 L Turbo Flat-6	**Y**	199
9	C1	12	(Germany) Schornstein Racing Team	(Germany) Volkert Merl (Germany) Dieter Schornstein (Germany) "John Winter"	Porsche 956	**D**	198
9	C1	12	(Germany) Schornstein Racing Team	(Germany) Volkert Merl (Germany) Dieter Schornstein (Germany) "John Winter"	Porsche Type-935 2.6 L Turbo Flat-6	**D**	198
10	C1	2	(Germany) Rothmans Porsche	(Germany) Stefan Bellof (United Kingdom) Derek Bell	Porsche 956	**D**	195
10	C1	2	(Germany) Rothmans Porsche	(Germany) Stefan Bellof (United Kingdom) Derek Bell	Porsche Type-935 2.6 L Turbo Flat-6	**D**	195
11	C1	19	(Switzerland) Brun Motorsport GmbH	(Switzerland) Walter Brun (Australia) Vern Schuppan	Porsche 956	**D**	192
11	C1	19	(Switzerland) Brun Motorsport GmbH	(Switzerland) Walter Brun (Australia) Vern Schuppan	Porsche Type-935 2.6 L Turbo Flat-6	**D**	192
12	**C2**	**81**	**(Italy) Jolly Club**	**(Italy) Almo Coppelli (Italy) Davide Pavia (Switzerland) Marco Vanoli**	**Alba AR2**	**A**	**188**
12	**C2**	**81**	**(Italy) Jolly Club**	**(Italy) Almo Coppelli (Italy) Davide Pavia (Switzerland) Marco Vanoli**	**Giannini Carma FF 1.9 L Turbo I4**	**A**	**188**
13	C1	46	(France) Pierre Yver	(France) Pierre Yver (Belgium) Bernard de Dryver	Rondeau M382	**D**	186
13	C1	46	(France) Pierre Yver	(France) Pierre Yver (Belgium) Bernard de Dryver	Ford Cosworth DFL 3.3 L V8	**D**	186
14	C2	82	(Italy) Maurizio Gellini	(Italy) Maurizio Gellini (Italy) Pasquale Barberio (Italy) Gerardo Vatielli	Alba AR3	?	186
14	C2	82	(Italy) Maurizio Gellini	(Italy) Maurizio Gellini (Italy) Pasquale Barberio (Italy) Gerardo Vatielli	Ford Cosworth DFL 3.3 L V8	?	186
15	C1	35	(Germany) Procar Automobil AG	(Germany) Clemens Schikentanz (Netherlands) Huub Rothengatter	Sehcar C830	**D**	179
15	C1	35	(Germany) Procar Automobil AG	(Germany) Clemens Schikentanz (Netherlands) Huub Rothengatter	Porsche Type-935 2.6 L Turbo Flat-6	**D**	179
16	C1	21	(United Kingdom) Charles Ivey Racing	(United Kingdom) John Cooper (United Kingdom) Dudley Wood (United Kingdom) Barry Robinson	Grid S2	**A**	178
16	C1	21	(United Kingdom) Charles Ivey Racing	(United Kingdom) John Cooper (United Kingdom) Dudley Wood (United Kingdom) Barry Robinson	Porsche Type-930 3.0 L Turbo Flat-6	**A**	178
17	C1	13	(France) Primagaz Team Cougar	(France) Yves Courage (United Kingdom) Alain de Cadenet	Cougar C01B	**MI**	177
17	C1	13	(France) Primagaz Team Cougar	(France) Yves Courage (United Kingdom) Alain de Cadenet	Ford Cosworth DFL 3.3 L V8	**MI**	177
18	C2	79	(United Kingdom) A.D.A. Engineering	(United Kingdom) Ray Taft (United Kingdom) Ian Harrower (United Kingdom) Tom Dodd-Noble	ADA 01	?	173
18	C2	79	(United Kingdom) A.D.A. Engineering	(United Kingdom) Ray Taft (United Kingdom) Ian Harrower (United Kingdom) Tom Dodd-Noble	Ford Cosworth DFV 3.0 L V8	?	173
19	**B**	**102**	**(Germany) Jürgensen Racing**	**(Germany) Edgar Dören (Germany) Walter Mertes**	**BMW M1**	?	**170**
19	**B**	**102**	**(Germany) Jürgensen Racing**	**(Germany) Edgar Dören (Germany) Walter Mertes**	**BMW M88/1 3.5 L I6**	?	**170**
20	B	100	(Germany) Rolf Göring	(Germany) Rolf Göring (Switzerland) Mario Ketterer (Switzerland) Hans-Jörg Dürig	BMW M1	**D**	168
20	B	100	(Germany) Rolf Göring	(Germany) Rolf Göring (Switzerland) Mario Ketterer (Switzerland) Hans-Jörg Dürig	BMW M88/1 3.5 L I6	**D**	168
21	C1	34	Team Australia (United Kingdom) John Fitzpatrick Racing	(Australia) Peter Brock (Australia) Larry Perkins	Porsche 956	**D**	162
21	C1	34	Team Australia (United Kingdom) John Fitzpatrick Racing	(Australia) Peter Brock (Australia) Larry Perkins	Porsche Type-935 2.6 L Turbo Flat-6	**D**	162
22	**IMSA; GTX**	**131**	**(Italy) "Victor"**	**(Italy) "Victor" (Italy) Gianni Giudici (Italy) Gianni Mussato**	**Porsche 935**	?	**154**
22	**IMSA; GTX**	**131**	**(Italy) "Victor"**	**(Italy) "Victor" (Italy) Gianni Giudici (Italy) Gianni Mussato**	**Porsche Type-930 3.2 L Turbo Flat-6**	?	**154**
23 NC	C1	65	(United Kingdom) John Bartlett	(United Kingdom) John Bartlett (United Kingdom) John Brindley (United Kingdom) Steve Kempton	Lola T610	**D**	138
23 NC	C1	65	(United Kingdom) John Bartlett	(United Kingdom) John Bartlett (United Kingdom) John Brindley (United Kingdom) Steve Kempton	Ford Cosworth DFL 3.3 L V8	**D**	138
24 NC	C2	70	(United Kingdom) Spice-Tiga Racing	(United Kingdom) Gordon Spice (United Kingdom) Ray Bellm (Australia) Neil Crang	Tiga GC84	**A**	65
24 NC	C2	70	(United Kingdom) Spice-Tiga Racing	(United Kingdom) Gordon Spice (United Kingdom) Ray Bellm (Australia) Neil Crang	Ford Cosworth DFL 3.3 L V8	**A**	65
25 NC	C1	16	(United Kingdom) GTi Engineering	(United Kingdom) Richard Lloyd (United Kingdom) Nick Mason	Porsche 956	**D**	65
25 NC	C1	16	(United Kingdom) GTi Engineering	(United Kingdom) Richard Lloyd (United Kingdom) Nick Mason	Porsche Type-935 2.6 L Flat-6	**D**	65
26 DNF	C1	18	(Germany) Obermaier Racing GmbH	(Belgium) Hervé Regout (Germany) Jürgen Lässig (South Africa) George Fouché	Porsche 956	**D**	201
26 DNF	C1	18	(Germany) Obermaier Racing GmbH	(Belgium) Hervé Regout (Germany) Jürgen Lässig (South Africa) George Fouché	Porsche Type-935 2.6 L Turbo Flat-6	**D**	201
27 DNF	C1	9	(Switzerland) Brun Motorsport	(Argentina) Oscar Larrauri (Italy) Massimo Sigala	Porsche 956	**D**	180
27 DNF	C1	9	(Switzerland) Brun Motorsport	(Argentina) Oscar Larrauri (Italy) Massimo Sigala	Porsche Type-935 2.6 L Turbo Flat-6	**D**	180
28 DNF	C2	77	(United Kingdom) Ecurie Ecosse	(United Kingdom) Mike Wilds (United Kingdom) David Duffield	Ecosse C284	**A**	177
28 DNF	C2	77	(United Kingdom) Ecurie Ecosse	(United Kingdom) Mike Wilds (United Kingdom) David Duffield	Ford Cosworth DFV 3.0 L V8	**A**	177
29 DNF	C2	86	(Japan) Mazdaspeed	(Japan) Yojiro Terada (Belgium) Pierre Dieudonné	Mazda 727C	**D**	151
29 DNF	C2	86	(Japan) Mazdaspeed	(Japan) Yojiro Terada (Belgium) Pierre Dieudonné	Mazda 13B 1.3 L 2-Rotor	**D**	151
30 DNF	B	117	(Sweden) Strandell Racing	(Sweden) Kenneth Leim (Sweden) Tomas Wiren	Porsche 930	?	114
30 DNF	B	117	(Sweden) Strandell Racing	(Sweden) Kenneth Leim (Sweden) Tomas Wiren	Porsche 3.3 L Turbo Flat-6	?	114
31 DNF	IMSA; GTP	88	(United Kingdom) Arthur Hough Pressings (United Kingdom) Ark Racing	(United Kingdom) Max Payne (United Kingdom) Chris Ashmore	Ceekar 83J	**A**	106
31 DNF	IMSA; GTP	88	(United Kingdom) Arthur Hough Pressings (United Kingdom) Ark Racing	(United Kingdom) Max Payne (United Kingdom) Chris Ashmore	Ford Cosworth BDX 2.0 L I4	**A**	106
32 DNF	C1	31	(United Kingdom) Viscount Downe (United Kingdom) Aston Martin Lagonda Ltd.	(United Kingdom) Richard Attwood (United Kingdom) John Sheldon (United Kingdom) David Salmon	Nimrod NRA/C2B	**A**	103
32 DNF	C1	31	(United Kingdom) Viscount Downe (United Kingdom) Aston Martin Lagonda Ltd.	(United Kingdom) Richard Attwood (United Kingdom) John Sheldon (United Kingdom) David Salmon	Aston Martin DP1229 5.3 L V8	**A**	103
33 DNF	B	107	(France) Raymond Bountinaud	(France) Raymond Bountinaud (France) Philippe Renault (France) Gilles Guinand	Porsche 928S	?	100
33 DNF	B	107	(France) Raymond Bountinaud	(France) Raymond Bountinaud (France) Philippe Renault (France) Gilles Guinand	Porsche 4.7 L V8	?	100
34 DNF	C2	99	(United Kingdom) J.Q.F. Engineering	(United Kingdom) Jeremy Rossiter (United Kingdom) Roy Baker (United Kingdom) François Duret	Tiga GC84	**A**	88
34 DNF	C2	99	(United Kingdom) J.Q.F. Engineering	(United Kingdom) Jeremy Rossiter (United Kingdom) Roy Baker (United Kingdom) François Duret	Ford Cosworth BDT 1.8 L Turbo I4	**A**	88
35 DNF	B1	109	(Germany) Helmut Gall	(Germany) Helmut Gall (Germany) Ulli Richter (Morocco) Max Cohen-Olivar	BMW M1	**D**	66
35 DNF	B1	109	(Germany) Helmut Gall	(Germany) Helmut Gall (Germany) Ulli Richter (Morocco) Max Cohen-Olivar	BMW M88/1 3.5 L I6	**D**	66
36 DNF	C1	4	(Italy) Martini Racing	(Italy) Riccardo Patrese (France) Bob Wollek	Lancia LC2	**D**	56
36 DNF	C1	4	(Italy) Martini Racing	(Italy) Riccardo Patrese (France) Bob Wollek	Ferrari 308C 2.6 L Turbo V8	**D**	56
37 DNF	C1	38	(United Kingdom) Dorset Racing	(United Kingdom) John Williams (United Kingdom) Richard Jones (Republic of Ireland) Mark Galvin	Dome RC82	**D**	46
37 DNF	C1	38	(United Kingdom) Dorset Racing	(United Kingdom) John Williams (United Kingdom) Richard Jones (Republic of Ireland) Mark Galvin	Ford Cosworth DFL 3.3 L V8	**D**	46
38 DNF	C1	32	(United Kingdom) Viscount Downe (United Kingdom) Aston Martin Lagonda Ltd.	(United Kingdom) Ray Mallock (United States) Drake Olson	Nimrod NRA/C2B	**A**	41
38 DNF	C1	32	(United Kingdom) Viscount Downe (United Kingdom) Aston Martin Lagonda Ltd.	(United Kingdom) Ray Mallock (United States) Drake Olson	Aston Martin DP1229 5.3 L V8	**A**	41
39 DNF	IMSA; GTP	132	(United Kingdom) Lyncar Motorsports Inc.	(United Kingdom) Les Blackburn (United Kingdom) Richard Down (Greece) Costas Los	Lyncar MS83	**A**	39
39 DNF	IMSA; GTP	132	(United Kingdom) Lyncar Motorsports Inc.	(United Kingdom) Les Blackburn (United Kingdom) Richard Down (Greece) Costas Los	Hart 420R 2.0 L I4	**A**	39
40 DSQ^{†}	C2	74	(United Kingdom) Scorpion Racing Services	(United Kingdom) Eddie Arundel (United Kingdom) James Weaver (United States) John Jellinek	Arundel C200	**A**	34
40 DSQ^{†}	C2	74	(United Kingdom) Scorpion Racing Services	(United Kingdom) Eddie Arundel (United Kingdom) James Weaver (United States) John Jellinek	Ford Cosworth DFV 3.0 L V8	**A**	34
41 DNF	C2	72	(Germany) Gebhardt Motorsport	(Germany) Frank Jelinski (United Kingdom) Bob Evans	Gebhardt JC842	**A**	26
41 DNF	C2	72	(Germany) Gebhardt Motorsport	(Germany) Frank Jelinski (United Kingdom) Bob Evans	BMW M12/7 2.0 L I4	**A**	26
42 DNF	B	111	(United Kingdom) Charles Ivey Racing	(United Kingdom) Paul Smith (United States) Paul Haas (United States) Margie Smith-Haas	Porsche 930	**A**	19
42 DNF	B	111	(United Kingdom) Charles Ivey Racing	(United Kingdom) Paul Smith (United States) Paul Haas (United States) Margie Smith-Haas	Porsche 3.3 L Turbo Flat-6	**A**	19
43 DNF	C2	80	(Italy) Jolly Club	(Italy) Carlo Facetti (Italy) Martino Finotto	Alba AR2	**A**	17
43 DNF	C2	80	(Italy) Jolly Club	(Italy) Carlo Facetti (Italy) Martino Finotto	Giannini Carma FF 1.9 L Turbo I4	**A**	17
44 DNF	B	101	(Denmark) Jens Winther Team Castrol	(Denmark) Jens Winther (Denmark) Jens Winther, Jr. (United Kingdom) David Mercer	BMW M1	**A**	6
44 DNF	B	101	(Denmark) Jens Winther Team Castrol	(Denmark) Jens Winther (Denmark) Jens Winther, Jr. (United Kingdom) David Mercer	BMW M88/1 3.5 L I6	**A**	6
DNS	B	114	(France) Lateste Racing	(France) Michel Lateste (France) Michel Bienvault	Porsche 930	?	-
DNS	B	114	(France) Lateste Racing	(France) Michel Lateste (France) Michel Bienvault	Porsche 3.3 L Turbo Flat-6	?	-
DNS	IMSA; GTX	130	(Sweden) Tuff Kote Dinol Racing	(Sweden) Jan Lundgårdh	Porsche 935 L1	?	-
DNS	IMSA; GTX	130	(Sweden) Tuff Kote Dinol Racing	(Sweden) Jan Lundgårdh	Porsche Type-930 2.9 L Turbo Flat-6	?	-

† - The #74 Scorpion Racing Services Arundel-Ford was disqualified during the race for receiving technical assistance while still on the track.

== Statistics ==
- Pole Position - #4 Martini Racing - 1:13.84
- Fastest Lap - #1 Rothmans Porsche - 1:16.76
- Average Speed - 196.560 km/h (122.137 mph)

World Sportscar Championship
Previous race: 1984 1000 km of Monza	1984 season	Next race: 1984 24 Hours of Le Mans
