= Martin Birrane =

Irish racing driver and businessman (1935–2018)

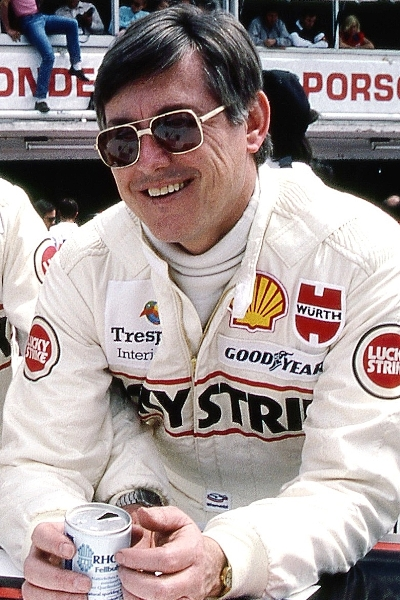
Martin Birrane prior to the 24 Hours of Le Mans in 1986

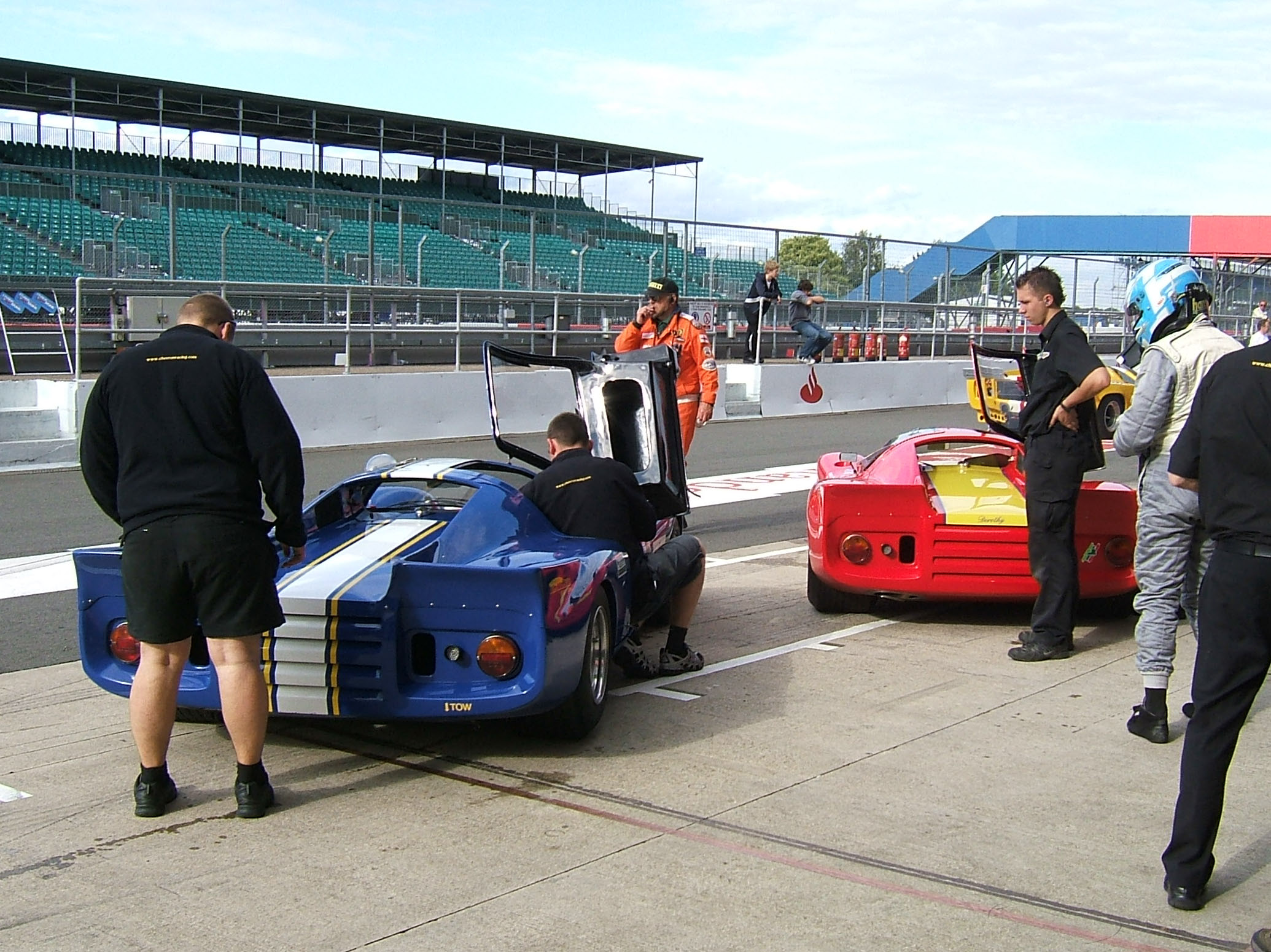
Birrane's blue racing car

Martin Brendan Birrane (19 August 1935 – 9 June 2018) was an Irish businessman and former racing driver. Born in Ballina, County Mayo and educated at St Muredach's College, Birrane made his money in property development, with his company Peer Group.

Birrane was the owner of the Mondello Park racetrack in County Kildare, which is the only FIA 3 1/2 kilometre track in Ireland. It hosts domestic and international events.

Biranne competed in the Le Mans 24 Hours ten times as a driver, winning the GT class in 1985. In 1990, he attempted to break the then Irish land speed record of 294.56 km/h, set by Mel Nolan on a turbocharged motorcycle over a "flying kilometre" on the Carrigrohane Straight in Cork in 1981. Martin reached 176 mph (283 km/h) on the then-unopened Westlink, now known as the M50, in Dublin.

Birrane owned Team Ireland, a NASCAR Winston Cup Series car racing team from 1991 to 1992. He was the owner of racing car manufacturer Lola Cars from 1997 until the company was closed down in 2012. The Sunday Times Rich List 2011 valued his assets at €85 million.

Birrane died in June 2018 at the age of 82.

== Racing record ==
=== Complete British Saloon Car Championship results ===
(key) (Races in bold indicate pole position; races in italics indicate fastest lap.)

Year	Team	Car	Class	1	2	3	4	5	6	7	8	9	10	11	12	13	Pos.	Pts	Class
1968	Martin Birrane	Ford Falcon Sprint	D	BRH	THR	SIL	CRY	MAL	BRH	SIL; 13	CRO	OUL	BRH; Ret	BRH; NC			NC	0	NC
1969	Martin Birrane	Ford Falcon Sprint	D	BRH; DNS	SIL; 18	SNE; 6	THR; 5	SIL; Ret	CRY; Ret†	MAL; Ret†	CRO; 18	SIL; DNS	OUL; 6	BRH; Ret	BRH; Ret		21st	10	4th
1970	Martin Birrane	Ford Mustang	D	BRH	SNE	THR	SIL; Ret	CRY; DNS	SIL; Ret	SIL	CRO; DNS	BRH	OUL	BRH; Ret	BRH; 2		31st	8	6th
1971	Martin Birrane	Ford Mustang Boss 302	D	BRH	SNE; 7	THR; Ret	SIL; Ret	CRY; Ret†	SIL; Ret	CRO	SIL; 4	OUL; 4	BRH; DNS	MAL	BRH; 4		23rd	10	6th
1972	Cona Coffee Machine Company	Ford Mustang Boss 302	D	BRH; Ret	OUL; 8	THR; Ret	SIL; 7	CRY; 8†	BRH; Ret	OUL; Ret	SIL; 7	MAL	BRH; Ret				26th	10	6th
1973	Martin Birrane	Ford Mustang Boss 302	D	BRH	SIL	THR	THR	SIL	ING	BRH	SIL; DNS	BRH					NC	0	NC
1974	Adlards of Brixton	Ford Capri 3000 GT	C	MAL; 7†	BRH; 7	SIL; 15	OUL	THR	SIL	THR	BRH	ING	BRH; 7†	OUL	SNE	BRH; Ret	22nd	15	6th

† Events with 2 races staged for the different classes.

=== Complete World Sportscar Championship results ===
(key) (Races in bold indicate pole position) (Races in italics indicate fastest lap)

Year	Entrant	Class	Chassis	Engine	1	2	3	4	5	6	7	8	9	10	11	12	13	14	15	Pos.	Pts
1972	Motor Racing Facilities	GTS	Datsun 240Z	Datsun 2.4 L6	BUE	DAY	SEB	BRH	MNZ	SPA	TAR	NÜR	LMS; DNQ	ÖST						(Note: No drivers' Championship.)	
1972	Alain de Cadenet	S 3.0	Duckhams LM	Ford Cosworth DFV 3.0 V8											GLN; Ret					(Note: No drivers' Championship.)	
1973	Crowne Racing	GT 3.0	Porsche 911 Carrera RS	Porsche 3.0 F6	DAY	VAL	DIJ	MNZ; DNQ	SPA	TAR	NÜR	LMS	ÖST	GLN							
1974	Escuderia Montjuich	S 2.0	Lola T294	Ford Cosworth BDG 2.0 L4	MNZ	SPA	NÜR	IMO	LMS	ÖST	GLN	LEC	BRH; Ret	KYA							
1977	Dorset Racing	S 2.0	Lola T294S	Ford Cosworth FVC 2.0 L4	DIJ	MNZ	VAL	PER	EST; NC	LEC	IMO	SAL								(Note: In 1976 and 1977 the World Championship was divided into two series that ran simultaneously but separately: The World Sportscar Championship and the World Championship for Makes.)	
1980	Frox Clothing Company Ltd.	Gr.5	Lotus Esprit S1	Ford Cosworth BDG 2.0 L4	DAY	BRH	MUG	MNZ	SIL; DNS	NÜR											
1980	Dorset Racing Associates	S 2.0	Lola T297	Ford Cosworth BDG 2.0 L4							LMS; 22	GLN	MOS	VAL	DIJ						
1981	Dorset Racing Associates	S +2.0	De Cadenet-Lola LM	Ford Cosworth DFV 3.0 V8	DAY	SEB	MUG	MNZ	RSD	SIL	NÜR	LMS; Ret	PER	DAY	GLN	SPA	MOS	ROA		157th	16
1981	Dorset Racing Associates	S 2.0	Lola T297	Ford Cosworth BDG 2.0 L4															BRH; 7	157th	16
1982	Chevron Cars	Gr.6	Chevron B36	Ford Cosworth BDG 2.0 L4	MNZ	SIL; Ret	NÜR	LMS; Ret	SPA; 16	MUG	FUJ	BRH; 20								NC	0
1983	Peer Racing	C	Ford C100	Cosworth DFL 3.3 V8	MNZ	SIL	NÜR	LMS; Ret	SPA	FUJ	KYA									NC	0
1985	Helmut Gall	B	BMW M1	BMW M88 3.5 L6	MUG	MNZ	SIL	LMS; 15												NC	0
1985	Jens Winther	C2	URD C83	BMW M88 3.5 L6					HOC; 14	MOS	SPA	BRH								NC	0
1985	Barlett Chevron Racing	C2	Chevron B62	Cosworth DFL 3.3 V8									FUJ; Ret	SHA						NC	0
1986	Martin Schanche Racing	C2	Argo JM19	Zakspeed 1.8 L4t	MNZ	SIL	LMS; Ret	NOR	BRH	JER	NÜR	SPA	FUJ							NC	0
1988	PC Automotive	C2	Argo JM19C	Cosworth DFL 3.3 V8	JER	JAR	MNZ; Ret	SIL												NC	0
1988	Chamberlain Engineering	C2	Spice SE86C	Hart 418T 1.8 L4t					LMS; Ret	BRN	BRH; Ret	NÜR	SPA	FUJ	SAN					NC	0

Footnotes

=== Complete European F5000 Championship results ===
(key) (Races in bold indicate pole position; races in italics indicate fastest lap.)

Year	Entrant	Chassis	Engine	1	2	3	4	5	6	7	8	9	10	11	12	13	14	15	16	17	18	Pos.	Pts
1974	Crowne Racing	Brabham BT43	Chevrolet 5.0 V8	BRH	MAL	SIL	OUL	BRH	ZOL	THR	ZAN	MUG	MNZ; Ret	MAL; DNQ	MON	THR; Ret	BRH	OUL	SNE	MAL	BRH	NC	0

=== Complete Shellsport International Series results ===
(key) (Races in bold indicate pole position; races in italics indicate fastest lap)

Year	Entrant	Chassis	Engine	1	2	3	4	5	6	7	8	9	10	11	12	13	14	Pos.	Pts
1976	David Price Racing	Chevron B29	Ford BDA 1.6 L4	MAL	SNE	OUL	BRH	THR	BRH; DNQ	MAL	SNE							NC	0
1976	Martin Birrane	Chevron B29	Ford BDA Nicholson 1.6 L4									BRH; 25	THR	OUL	BRH; DNS	BRH		NC	0
1977	Martin Birrane	Chevron B29	Ford BDA 1.6 L4	MAL	SNE	OUL	BRH	MAL	THR	BRH	OUL	MAL	DON	BRH; Ret	THR	SNE	BRH	NC	0

=== 24 Hours of Le Mans results ===
Year	Team	Co-Drivers	Car	Class	Laps	Pos.	Class Pos.
1972	(United Kingdom) Motor Racing Facilities Ltd.	(United Kingdom) Robert Grant (Belgium) Sergé Troch	Datsun 240Z	GTS	-	DNQ	DNQ
1977	(United Kingdom) Dorset Racing Associates	(United Kingdom) Ian Harrower (Netherlands) Ernst Berg (United Kingdom) Richard Down	Lola T294S-Ford Cosworth	S 2.0	212	NC	NC
1978	(United Kingdom) Dorset Racing Associates	(United Kingdom) Bob Evans (United Kingdom) Richard Down	Lola T294S-Ford Cosworth	S 2.0	23	DNF	DNF
1980	(United Kingdom) Dorset Racing Associates	(United Kingdom) Peter Clarke (United Kingdom) Nick Mason	Lola T297-Ford Cosworth	S 2.0	263	22nd	**3rd**
1981	(United Kingdom) Dorset Racing Associates	(United Kingdom) Nick Faure (Republic of Ireland) Vivian Candy	De Cadenet-Lola LM-Ford Cosworth	S +2.0	171	DNF	DNF
1982	(United Kingdom) Chevron Cars	(United Kingdom) John Sheldon (Australia) Neil Crang	Chevron B36-Ford Cosworth	Gr.6	57	DNF	DNF
1983	(United Kingdom) Peer Racing	(France) François Migault (Republic of Ireland) David Kennedy	Ford C100	C	16	DNF	DNF
1985	(Germany) Helmut Gall	(Germany) Edgar Dören (Belgium) Jean-Paul Libert	BMW M1	B	307	15th	**1st**
1986	(Norway) Martin Schanche Racing	(Norway) Martin Schanche (Norway) Torgye Kleppe	Argo JM19-Zakspeed	C2	1	DNF	DNF
1988	(United Kingdom) Chamberlain Engineering	(United Kingdom) Richard Jones (United Kingdom) Nick Adams	Spice SE86C-Hart	C2	223	DNF	DNF
