= Derek Cook =

British racing driver (1946–2005)

- Nationality: British
- Born: 16 June 1946 Doncaster, England
- Died: 1 May 2005 (aged 58) Monaco
- Relatives: David Cook; Paula Cook; Jake Cook

Shellsport International Series
- Years active: 1976–1977
- Starts: 9
- Wins: 0
- Poles: 0
- Fastest laps: 0

Previous series
- 1977 1976 1975 1974–1975: European Formula Two Championship; Indylantic Championship; John Player British Formula Atlantic; Southern Organs British Formula Atlantic

Derek Cook (16 June 1946 – 1 May 2005) was a British auto racing driver and businessman. He was most notable for competing in the Shellsport International Series in 1976 and 1977, and for running the DC Cook Motorsports team in the 1990s. He also ran the DC Cook Direct dealership, prior to his death in a car crash in 2005.

== Racing career ==
In 1974, Cook entered four rounds of the Southern Organs British Formula Atlantic, driving a Chevron B27-Hart/Ford, and finished twentieth overall, without scoring a point. For 1975, he entered a round of the BARC F3 Championship (with a GRD 374), but did not compete, whilst he entered eight rounds of the Southern Organs British Formula Atlantic (finishing tenth, with seven points), and nine rounds of the John Player British Formula Atlantic (finishing 16th, with 25 points), using both a Chevron B27, and a March 75B-Ford during the season.

Cook moved into the Shellsport International Series for 1976, completing three races in the Chevron, whilst he also competed in three races of the Indylantic Championship (a new series, being the result of the merger of the two British Formula Atlantic competitions) with that car, without scoring any points in either competition. For 1977, he entered a single round of the European Formula Two Championship, and six races of the Shellsport International Series, taking eighth place overall in the latter championship, with 22 points, in what proved to be his last competitive season of racing. His solitary F2 race was at the Daily Express International Trophy, held at Silverstone Circuit, where he finished 11th in the Chevron, of 12 finishers.

== Dealership ==
In 1988, Cook formed his DC Cook chain of dealers. In 1996, the franchise made a turnover of £180 million, with pre-tax profits of £5 million – with the capital return being 2.77%, a figure well above the industry average. Following this record profit, the company set about expanding, with the aim of increasing turnover to £400 million. This, however, would prove unsuccessful; although turnover had increased to £337 million by 1999, an internet venture between DC Cook and Totalise Eurekar came at a point when the main portion of the dealership were beginning to enter difficulties, and in 2000, the share price had fallen to 9p (having been as high as 54p in 1998), with shares being suspended. The company then entered receivership in 2001, with debts totaling £27 million, with receivers stating "after rapid expansion the dealer failed to bed down its new acquisitions. The rationalisation of the past two years did not work and the company collapsed under a debt burden of £27m".

Following the collapse of DC Cook, the Cook family started DC Cook Direct, which sold discounted new cars. However, a year prior to his death, this company also encountered difficulties; following complaints by customers, South Yorkshire Trading Standards Service cancelled the company's membership of a fair business scheme. In 2008, DC Cook Direct entered liquidation, with the company being run by his daughter, Paula. In addition to the formation of DC Cook Direct, Derek Cook had also formed Motor Solutions in 2002, an online discount dealer of new and used cars, which was later sold to Virgin Group (with Virgin taking a 53% stake, and keeping Cook on as the chief executive), and renamed as Virgin Cars, before its closure in January 2006, seven months after Cook's death.

== Racing team ==
In the mid 1990s, DC Cook Motorsports was the auto racing branch of the DC Cook company. They had several drivers, both family members and non-family, and were most notable for their British Touring Car Championship and International Formula 3000 entries, with Guy Smith, later to win the 2003 24 Hours of Le Mans, driving for the team in the 1997 British Formula Three season, being their most notable driver. The team were forced to cease their activities partway through the 1999 season, as the parent company had developed financial difficulties.

== Death ==
On 1 May 2005, Derek Cook, and his wife Winnie Cook (who was celebrating her 60th birthday), were out driving during a holiday in Monaco, when they were involved in a crash. Derek Cook was killed in the crash, whilst his wife escaped with injuries. Following his death, his daughter, Paula, took over the DC Cook Direct dealership franchise, and controlled it until its collapse at the end of 2008/beginning of 2009.
