= Paula Cook =

British racing driver (born 1969)

- Nationality: (United Kingdom) British
- Born: 2 November 1969 (age 57) Rotherham, England
- Relatives: David Cook; Derek Cook; Jake Cook

British Touring Car Championship
- Years active: 1998–1999
- Teams: DC Cook Motorsport
- Starts: 20
- Wins: 0
- Poles: 0
- Fastest laps: 0
- Best finish: 19th in 1999

Previous series
- 2004 2003 2003 2003 2003 2002 2000 1998–99 1997 1995–98 1995 1994 1994: British GT Championship; FIA GT Championship; SEAT Cupra Championship; Porsche Supercup; SEAT Cupra Superprix; ASCAR; Lotus Elise Championship; British Touring Car Championship; RAC Tourist Trophy; British Formula 3 Championship; British Formula Renault; Formula Vauxhall Junior Winter Series; Formula Vauxhall Junior

Paula Cook (born 2 November 1969) is a British motor racing driver. She is best known as an independent driver in the British Touring Car Championship competing for the family-run DC Cook Motorsports. She ran the family-owned DC Cook Direct dealership after her father's death in 2005 until its closure in 2009.

== Racing career ==
=== Early career ===
Born in Rotherham, Cook began her motor racing career in 1994, when she competed in both the Formula Vauxhall Junior and Formula Vauxhall Junior Winter Series championships, finishing second overall in the latter. British Formula Renault (becoming the first female ever to achieve a pole position in an international race), followed by three years in the British Formula 3 Championship between 1996 and 1998. In 1997, she drove for the works Nissan team in the RAC Tourist Trophy.

=== BTCC ===
Towards the end of 1998 British Touring Car Championship season, Cook entered the final four rounds for her father's DC Cook Motorsport Team in a Honda Accord. She entered once more with DC Cook in 1999, planning to compete in the entire season, the first woman to do so. However, despite a reasonable start to the year, the season for Cook was cut short after round 16, after her team pulled out of the series due to financial difficulties.

In her 20 BTCC race starts, Cook scored three points and two Independents cup race victories.

=== Later career ===
After the BTCC, Cook raced in the Lotus Elise Championship and the SEAT Cupra Championship. In 2002, she entered a one-off ASCAR race at Rockingham. In 2003, she competed in the SEAT Cupra Championship for the first time, before later entering two races for the Morgan Works Race Team in the FIA GT Championship, Most recently she has competed in the British GT Championship in 2004, driving the Chevrolet Corvette C5R of the Embassy Racing team. following an outing in the Porsche Supercup.

== Personal life ==
Cook was born into a racing family - her father, Derek, was a racing driver in the 1970s. Her brother David also competed in motorsports, and was most notable for winning the 1996 British Formula Renault series. In addition to this, her nephew, Jake, entered the 2013 Formula Renault UK series, with Paula employed as his manager. She helped run the family-owned DC Cook Direct dealership franchise, taking over the company following the death of her father in a car crash in 2005, and remaining in charge until the company was liquidated in 2009.

== Racing record ==
=== Complete British Touring Car Championship results ===
(key) (Races in bold indicate pole position - 1 point awarded all races) (Races in italics indicate fastest lap) (* Signifies that the driver led the feature race for at least one lap - 1 point awarded)

Year	Team	Car	1	2	3	4	5	6	7	8	9	10	11	12	13	14	15	16	17	18	19	20	21	22	23	24	25	26	Pos	Pts
1998	DC Cook Motorsport	Honda Accord	THR; 1	THR; 2	SIL; 1	SIL; 2	DON; 1	DON; 2	BRH; 1	BRH; 2	OUL; 1	OUL; 2	DON; 1	DON; 2	CRO; 1	CRO; 2	SNE; 1	SNE; 2	THR; 1	THR; 2	KNO; 1	KNO; 2	BRH; 1	BRH; 2	OUL; 1; 16	OUL; 2; 13	SIL; 1; 16	SIL; 2; 12	24th	0
1999	DC Cook Motorsport	Honda Accord	DON; 1; 14	DON; 2 Ret	SIL; 1 Ret	SIL; 2; 9	THR; 1 Ret	THR; 2; 13	BRH; 1; 10	BRH; 2 Ret	OUL; 1 Ret	OUL; 2 Ret	DON; 1; 15	DON; 2; 13	CRO; 1; 14	CRO; 2; 13	SNE; 1 Ret	SNE; 2; 14	THR; 1	THR; 2	KNO; 1	KNO; 2	BRH; 1	BRH; 2	OUL; 1	OUL; 2	SIL; 1	SIL; 2	19th	3

=== Complete Porsche Supercup results ===
(key) (Races in bold indicate pole position) (Races in italics indicate fastest lap)

Year	Team	Car	1	2	3	4	5	6	7	8	9	10	11	12	DC	Points
2003	Tolimit Motorsport	Porsche 996 GT3	ITA1	ESP	AUT	MON; Ret	GER1	FRA	GBR; 24†	GER2	HUN	ITA2	USA1	USA2	NC‡	0‡

† – Did not finish the race, but was classified as she completed over 90% of the race distance.

‡ – Guest driver – Not eligible for points.
