= Dennis Leech =

British racing driver (born 1943)

- Nationality: (United Kingdom) British
- Born: 6 April 1943 (age 83) Sidmouth, Devon, England

British Saloon / Touring Car Championship
- Years active: 1969–1973, 1981–1988, 1990–1992
- Teams: Dennis Leech
- Starts: 95
- Wins: 3 (2 in class)
- Poles: 2
- Fastest laps: 3
- Best finish: 6th in 1987

Dennis Herbert Leech (born 6 April 1943 in Sidmouth) is a British former racing driver. Most of his racing career was spent driving saloon cars, mainly as a privateer in the British Touring Car Championship. He also entered selected rounds of the British Formula One Championship between 1978 and 1980. His most competitive years in the BTCC came in the 1980s, where he was often a front runner in his Class A 3.5 litre Rover Vitesse. In 1987, he finished as runner-up in his class, finishing sixth overall in his ageing Rover. His final year in the BTCC came in 1992, entering his own-built Ford Sierra.

Leech was the record holder for the longest period between wins in the BTCC, with nearly 18 years between his first two wins in 1969 and his last win in 1987, until Rob Huff broke this record in 2024.

== Racing record ==
=== Complete British Saloon / Touring Car Championship results ===
(key) (Races in bold indicate pole position; races in italics indicate fastest lap.)

Year	Team	Car	Class	1	2	3	4	5	6	7	8	9	10	11	12	13	14	15	Pos.	Pts	Class
1969	Dennis Leech	Ford Falcon Sprint	D	BRH	SIL	SNE	THR	SIL; Ret	CRY ovr:11† cls:3†	MAL ovr:2† cls:1†	CRO; Ret	SIL ovr:2 cls:2	OUL ovr:1 cls:1	BRH ovr:1 cls:1	**BRH** ovr:2 cls:2				10th	40	3rd
1970	Dennis Leech	Ford Mustang Boss 302	D	BRH	SNE	THR	SIL	CRY; Ret†	SIL ovr:2 cls:2	SIL	CRO ovr:10 cls:3	BRH; Ret	OUL ovr:3 cls:3	BRH ovr:2 cls:2	BRH ovr:23 cls:3				11th	24	3rd
1971	Castrol-Leechtune Engineering	Ford Mustang Boss 302	D	BRH ovr:5 cls:4	SNE ovr:4† cls:3†	THR ovr:3 cls:3	SIL ovr:4 cls:3	CRY; DNS†	SIL; DNS	CRO; Ret	SIL; Ret	OUL ovr:5 cls:4	BRH ovr:2 cls:1	MAL; DSQ†	BRH; Ret				14th	21	4th
1972	Dennis Leech	Ford Mustang Boss 429	D	BRH	OUL ovr:3 cls:3	THR ovr:4 cls:3	SIL ovr:9 cls:6	CRY; DNS†	BRH ovr:7 cls:3	OUL; Ret	SIL	MAL	BRH; NC						22nd	13	5th
1973	Dennis Leech	Ford Mustang Boss 429	D	BRH	SIL	THR	THR	SIL ovr:14 cls:3	ING ovr:? cls:2	BRH; Ret†	SIL	BRH							17th	10	3rd
1981	Dennis Leech	Ford Capri III 3.0S	D	MAL	SIL ovr:? cls:?	OUL ovr:12† cls:11†	THR ovr:? cls:?	BRH ovr:?† cls:?†	SIL	SIL	DON ovr:13† cls:11†	BRH ovr:10 cls:6	THR; Ret	SIL					44th	1	16th
1982	Dennis Leech	Rover 3500 S	D	SIL ovr:6 cls:6	MAL	OUL ovr:4† cls:4†	THR ovr:8 cls:7	THR ovr:5 cls:5	SIL ovr:8 cls:8	DON; Ret	BRH; Ret	DON	BRH	SIL; Ret					30th	6	8th
1983	Dennis Leech	Rover Vitesse	A	SIL	OUL	THR	BRH ovr:4 cls:3	THR; Ret	SIL; Ret	DON ovr:9 cls:6	SIL; Ret	DON	BRH	SIL					22nd	5	10th
1984	Dennis Leech	Rover Vitesse	A	DON ovr:7 cls:7	SIL; Ret	OUL	THR	THR	SIL ovr:8 cls:8	SNE	BRH; Ret	BRH	DON	SIL					NC	0	NC
1985	Dennis Leech	Rover Vitesse	A	SIL	OUL	THR	DON	THR	SIL	DON	SIL ovr:15 cls:7	SNE	BRH	BRH; Ret	SIL ovr:3 cls:3				25th	4	9th
1986	Dennis Leech	Rover Vitesse	A	SIL ovr:2 cls:2	THR; Ret	SIL; DNS	DON; DNS	BRH ovr:4 cls:4	SNE	BRH	DON	SIL; DNS							17th	10	5th
1987	Dennis Leech	Rover Vitesse	A	SIL ovr:2 cls:2	OUL	**THR** ovr:1 cls:1	THR ovr:4 cls:4	SIL ovr:2 cls:2	SIL ovr:7 cls:6	BRH ovr:2 cls:2	SNE ovr:4 cls:4	DON ovr:3 cls:2	OUL ovr:6 cls:4	DON ovr:16 cls:6	SIL; Ret				6th	44	2nd
1988	Dennis Leech	Rover Vitesse	A	SIL	OUL	THR; Ret	DON ovr:11 cls:9	THR; Ret	SIL ovr:14 cls:11	SIL ovr:17 cls:12	BRH ovr:12 cls:9	SNE	BRH	BIR	DON	SIL			NC	0	NC
1990	Judge Developments	Ford Sierra RS500	A	OUL	DON	THR	SIL; DNS	OUL ovr:10 cls:8	SIL ovr:7 cls:7	BRH	SNE	BRH ovr:19 cls:7	BIR; DNS	DON; Ret	THR; DNS	SIL			26th	11	10th
1991	Judge Developments	Ford Sierra RS500		SIL; 16	SNE; 14	DON; 8	THR; Ret	SIL	BRH	SIL	DON; 1	DON; 2	OUL	BRH; 1	BRH; 2	DON	THR	SIL	20th	3	
1992	Judge Developments	Ford Sierra RS Cosworth		SIL	THR	OUL	SNE	BRH	DON; 1	DON; 2	SIL; Ret	KNO; 1	KNO; 2	PEM; 17	BRH; 1; 15	BRH; 2; 15	DON; 13	SIL; 15	NC	0	

† Events with 2 races staged for the different classes.

=== Complete European F5000 Championship results ===
(key) (Races in bold indicate pole position; races in italics indicate fastest lap.)

Year	Entrant	Chassis	Engine	1	2	3	4	5	6	7	8	9	10	11	12	13	14	15	16	Pos.	Pts
1975	Dennis Leech	Chevron B24	Chevrolet 5.0 V8	BRH; DSQ	OUL; 8	BRH; 12	SIL; Ret	ZOL	ZAN	THR; DNS	SNE; Ret	MAL	THR; 9	BRH; 7	OUL; Ret	SIL; 13	SNE; Ret	MAL; DNS	BRH	26th	9

=== Complete Shellsport International Series results ===
(key) (Races in bold indicate pole position; races in italics indicate fastest lap.)

Year	Entrant	Chassis	Engine	1	2	3	4	5	6	7	8	9	10	11	12	13	14	Pos.	Pts
1976	Dennis Leech	Chevron B28	Chevrolet 5.0 V8	MAL	SNE	OUL	BRH	THR; 5	BRH; Ret	MAL; DNQ	SNE; 9	BRH; 23	THR; 10	OUL; Ret	BRH	BRH; 13		24th	11
1977	Dennis Leech	Chevron B28	Chevrolet 5.0 V8	MAL	SNE	OUL	BRH	MAL	THR	BRH	OUL; DNS	MAL	DON; 7	BRH; Ret	THR; 6	SNE	BRH	20th	10

=== Complete British Formula One Championship results ===
(key) (Races in bold indicate pole position; races in italics indicate fastest lap.)

Year	Entrant	Chassis	Engine	1	2	3	4	5	6	7	8	9	10	11	12	13	14	15	Pos.	Pts
1978	Dennis Leech	March 761	Ford Cosworth DFV 3.0 V8	OUL	BRH	SNE	MAL	ZAN	DON	THR	OUL	MAL	BRH	THR; 16	SNE				NC	0
1979	Dennis Leech	McLaren M23	Ford Cosworth DFV 3.0 V8	ZOL	OUL	BRH	MAL	SNE	THR	ZAN	DON	OUL	NOG	MAL	BRH	THR; 9	SNE	SIL	NC	0
1980	Dennis Leech	McLaren M23	Ford Cosworth DFV 3.0 V8	OUL	BRH	SIL	MAL	THR	MNZ	MAL	SNE	BRH	THR	OUL	SIL; 11				NC	0
