= Dave Morgan (racing driver) =

British racing driver (1944–2018)

- Born: 7 August 1944; Cranmore, Somerset, England
- Died: 6 November 2018 (aged 74); Leatherhead, Surrey, England

Formula One World Championship career
- Nationality: (United Kingdom) British
- Active years: 1975
- Team: Surtees
- Entries: 1
- Championships: 0
- Wins: 0
- Podiums: 0
- Career points: 0
- Pole positions: 0
- Fastest laps: 0
- First entry: 1975 British Grand Prix

David Rowland John Morgan (7 August 1944 – 6 November 2018) was a British racing driver from England. He participated in one Formula One World Championship Grand Prix, the 1975 British Grand Prix in which, like several others, he crashed during a storm in the closing laps. He was classified 18th and thus scored no championship points.

== Driving career ==
Prior to his single grand prix entry, Morgan raced a Mini in the mid-1960s, and soon moved on to Formula Three. He incurred a 12-month ban for dangerous driving at the end of 1970, after a last corner collision with James Hunt at Crystal Palace, but was allowed to progress to Formula Atlantic in 1971.

This was followed by two seasons in Formula Two, then a return to Formula Atlantic. After his one Grand Prix, he retired from racing until returning in the British Saloon Car Championship in 1980–1981, driving a Mitsubishi Colt Lancer. Morgan also later worked as an engineer to Eric van de Poele, in both Formula One and Formula 3000.

Morgan died on 6 November 2018, following a stroke.

== Racing record ==
=== Complete Formula One results ===
(key)

Year	Entrant	Chassis	Engine	1	2	3	4	5	6	7	8	9	10	11	12	13	14	WDC	Points
1975	Team Surtees	Surtees TS16	Cosworth V8	ARG	BRA	RSA	ESP	MON	BEL	SWE	NED	FRA	GBR; 18	GER	AUT	ITA	USA	NC	0

=== Complete British Saloon / Touring Car Championship results ===
(key) (Races in bold indicate pole position – 1973–1990 in class) (Races in italics indicate fastest lap – 1 point awarded ?–1989 in class)

Year	Team	Car	Class	1	2	3	4	5	6	7	8	9	10	11	12	DC	Pts	Class
1971	Dave Morgan	BMC Mini Cooper S	B	BRH; 23	OUL; Ret	THR; Ret	SIL; 19	CRY	SIL	CRO	SIL	OUL	BRH	MAL	BRH	NC	0	NC
1980	The Colt Car Co Ltd	Mitsubishi Colt GLX	B	MAL ?†	OUL	THR; 19	SIL; 16	SIL; Ret								21st	17	7th
1980	The Colt Car Co Ltd	Mitsubishi Colt Lancer	B						BRH ?	MAL; 3†	BRH; 12	THR; 13	SIL; 20			21st	17	7th
1981	The Colt Car Co Ltd	Mitsubishi Colt Lancer	B	MAL; Ret†	SIL; 24	OUL; 9†	THR; 18	BRH; 2†	SIL; 16	SIL; 14	DON; 3†	BRH; 12	THR ?	SIL; 9		13th	33	**3rd**
1987	TCCS Racing	Ford Sierra RS Cosworth	A	SIL	OUL	THR	THR	SIL	SIL; Ret	BRH	SNE	DON	OUL	DON	SIL	NC	0	NC

† Events with 2 races staged for the different classes.
