= Lyncar =

British racing car constructor

Lyncar as a Formula One chassis constructor
- Founder(s): Martin Slater

Formula One World Championship career
- Engines: Ford V8
- Entrants: Pinch (Plant) Ltd. (John Nicholson)
- First entry: 1974 British Grand Prix
- Last entry: 1975 British Grand Prix
- Races entered: 2 (1 start)
- Race victories: 0
- Constructors' Championships: 0
- Drivers' Championships: 0
- Pole positions: 0
- Fastest laps: 0

Lyncar was a racing car constructor from the United Kingdom. The company built one Formula One car, in 1974, which participated in two Grands Prix, the 1974 and 1975 British Grands Prix.

== History ==
Lyncar's founder Martin Slater had built and raced his own cars in junior formulae before becoming a designer for Lola, Brabham and March. In 1971, Slater built a car to enter the British Formula Atlantic Championship, the first of a series of machines which led to the Lyncar 005 with which McLaren engine-builder and amateur racer John Nicholson won the 1973 and 1974 championships.

=== Formula One ===
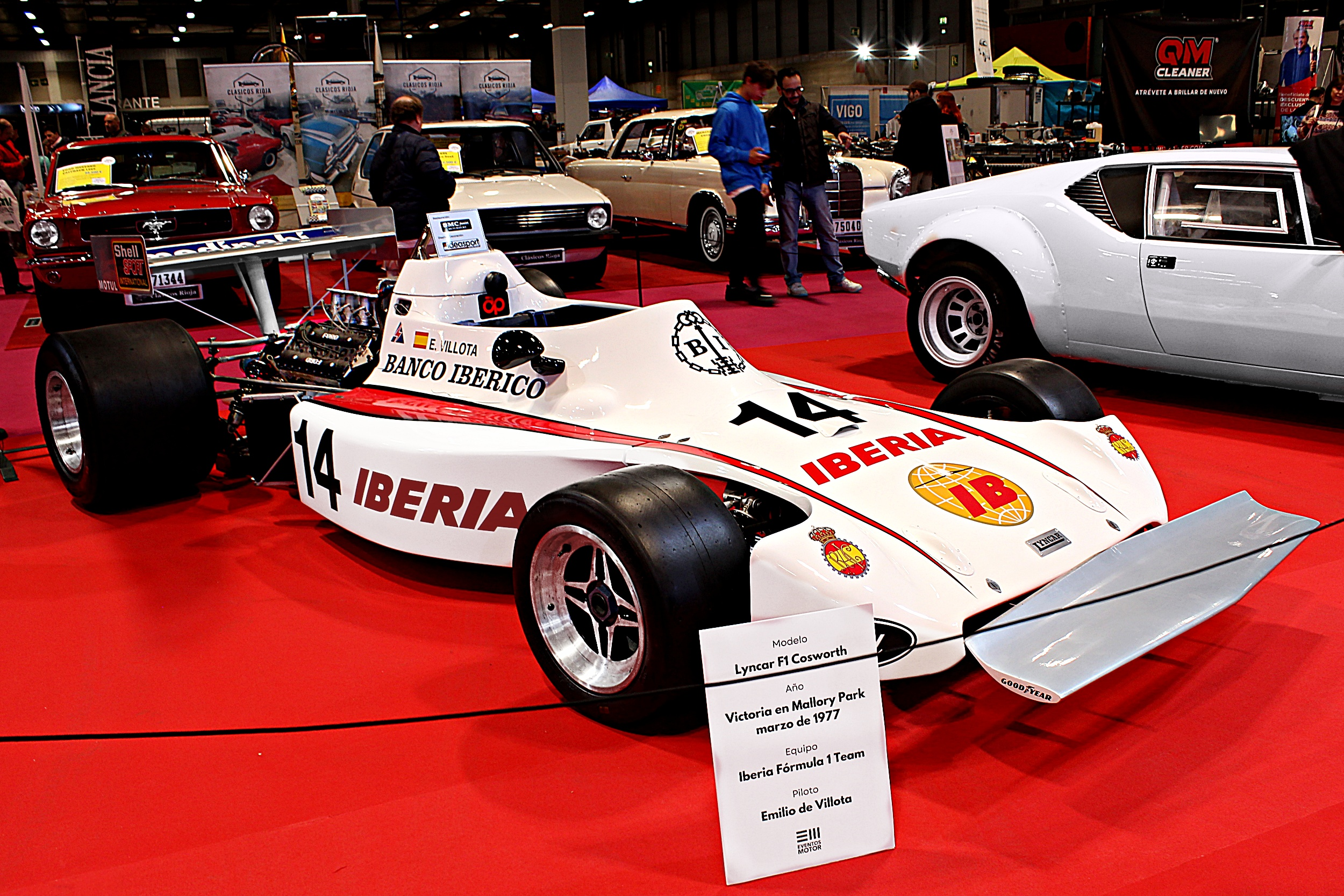
Lyncar F1 Cosworth that won at Mallory Park in 1977

Based upon success in Formula Atlantic, Nicholson commissioned a Formula One chassis from Slater. Nicholson had by then established his own engine building business and was unable to spare the time for a full Grand Prix season. He entered non-championship races and the British Grand Prix in both 1974 and 1975, qualifying for the latter. He was classified 17th (five laps behind) despite crashing in the heavy storm at the end of the race.

The car was later updated and entered for Emilio de Villota in the Shellsport International Series, winning a round in 1977 at Mallory Park.

=== Sportscars ===
In 1983, Greek racing driver Costas Los commissioned Slater to build a car for Group C2 class of the World Sportscar Championship. The car - dubbed the MS83 - was originally fitted with a Brian Hart 420R 2-litre engine, used before Los bought a Nicholson-fettled Cosworth DFV engine in May 1984, fitted after the Hart blew at the 1984 1000 km of Silverstone. It raced a number of times in the 1984 World Sportscar Championship season, without ever gaining a classified finish; however it would have been 2nd in class at the 1984 1000 km of Brands Hatch had it not been disqualified for its final lap taking too long.

== Complete Formula One World Championship results ==
(key)

Year	Entrant	Chassis	Engine	Tyres	Drivers	No.	1	2	3	4	5	6	7	8	9	10	11	12	13	14	15	Points	WCC
1974	Pinch (Plant) Ltd	Lyncar 006	Ford V8	F			ARG	BRA	RSA	ESP	BEL	MON	SWE	NED	FRA	GBR	GER	AUT	ITA	CAN	USA	0	NC
1974	Pinch (Plant) Ltd	Lyncar 006	Ford V8	F	(New Zealand) John Nicholson	29										DNQ						0	NC
1975	Pinch (Plant) Ltd.	Lyncar 006	Ford V8	G			ARG	BRA	RSA	ESP	MON	BEL	SWE	NED	FRA	GBR	GER	AUT	ITA	USA		0	NC
1975	Pinch (Plant) Ltd.	Lyncar 006	Ford V8	G	(New Zealand) John Nicholson	32										17						0	NC
