= Damien Magee =

British racing driver (born 1945)

- Born: 17 November 1945 (age 80); Belfast, Northern Ireland

Formula One World Championship career
- Nationality: (United Kingdom) British
- Active years: 1975–1976
- Team(s): Williams, RAM
- Entries: 2 (1 start)
- Championships: 0
- Wins: 0
- Podiums: 0
- Career points: 0
- Pole positions: 0
- Fastest laps: 0
- First entry: 1975 Swedish Grand Prix
- Last entry: 1976 French Grand Prix

Championship titles
- 1970: Scottish Formula Ford Championship

Damien Magee (born 17 November 1945) is a British former racing driver from Falls Road, Belfast, Northern Ireland. He participated in two Formula One World Championship Grands Prix, debuting on 8 June 1975. He scored no championship points.

Magee's only World Championship Grand Prix start came in 1975 when he replaced Arturo Merzario at Williams at short notice for the Swedish Grand Prix. The following year he tried to qualify a RAM-entered Brabham at the 1976 French Grand Prix, but missed out.

== Complete Formula One World Championship results ==
(key)

Year	Entrant	Chassis	Engine	1	2	3	4	5	6	7	8	9	10	11	12	13	14	15	16	WDC	Points
1975	Frank Williams Racing Cars	Williams FW03	Cosworth V8	ARG	BRA	RSA	ESP	MON	BEL	SWE; 14	NED	FRA	GBR	GER	AUT	ITA	USA			NC	0
1976	RAM Racing	Brabham BT44B	Cosworth V8	BRA	RSA	USW	ESP	BEL	MON	SWE	FRA; DNQ	GBR	GER	AUT	NED	ITA	CAN	USA	JPN	NC	0

== Complete Formula One non-championship results ==
(key)

Year	Entrant	Chassis	Engine	1	2	3
1974	AW Brown Racing	Lola T330 F5000	Chevrolet V8	PRE	ROC; Ret	INT; NC
1976	RAM Racing	Brabham BT44B	Cosworth V8	ROC	INT; Ret	
