= 1974 British Grand Prix =

Race details
- Date: 20 July 1974
- Official name: John Player Grand Prix
- Location: Brands Hatch, Kent, England
- Course: Permanent racing facility
- Course length: 4.206 km (2.613 miles)
- Distance: 75 laps, 315.45 km (195.975 miles)

Pole position
Driver	(Austria) Niki Lauda	Ferrari
- Time: 1:19.7

Fastest lap
Driver	(Austria) Niki Lauda	Ferrari
- Time: 1:21.1 on lap 25

Podium
First	(South Africa) Jody Scheckter	Tyrrell-Ford
Second	(Brazil) Emerson Fittipaldi	McLaren-Ford
Third	(Belgium) Jacky Ickx	Lotus-Ford

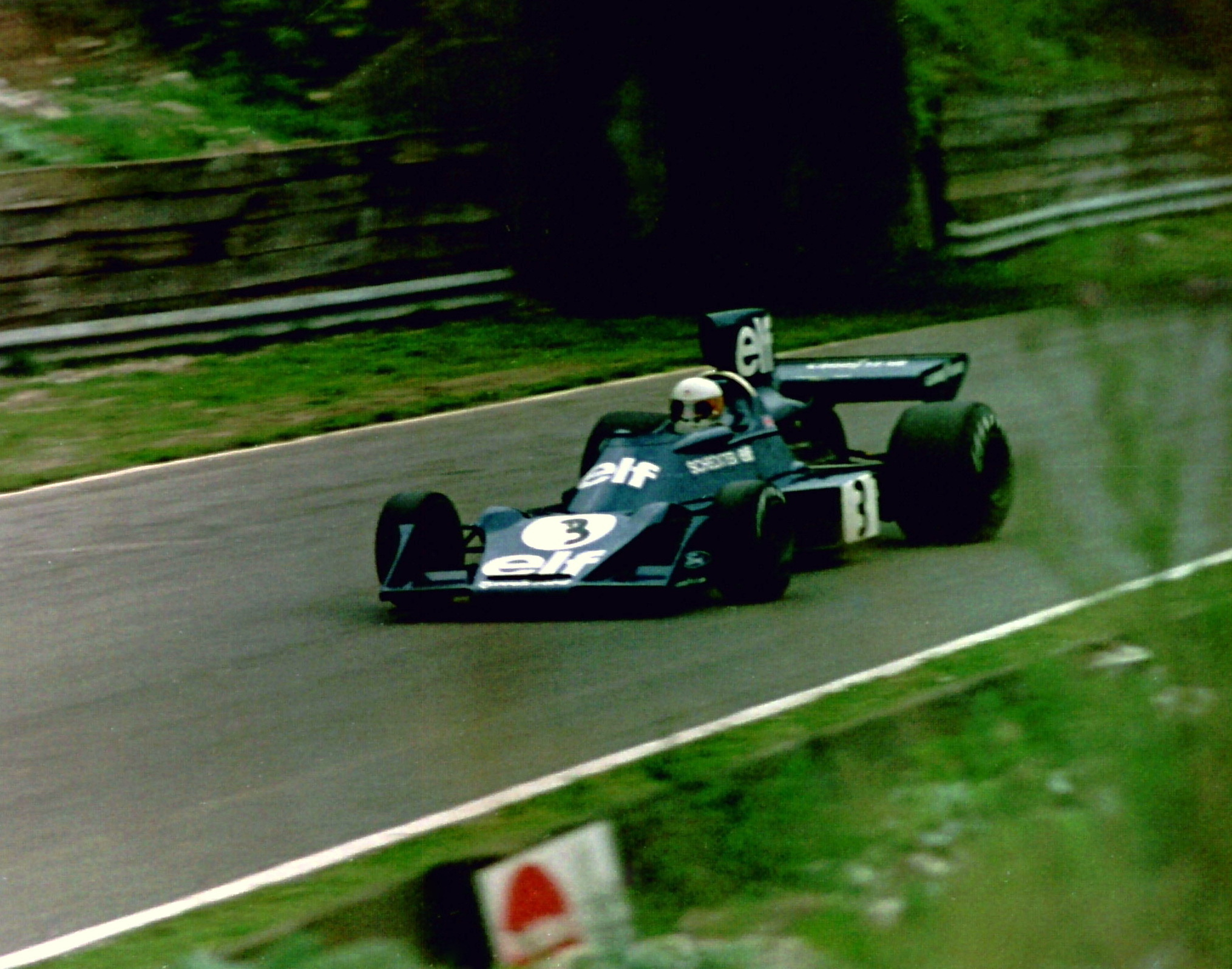
Jody Scheckter won the race for Tyrrell.

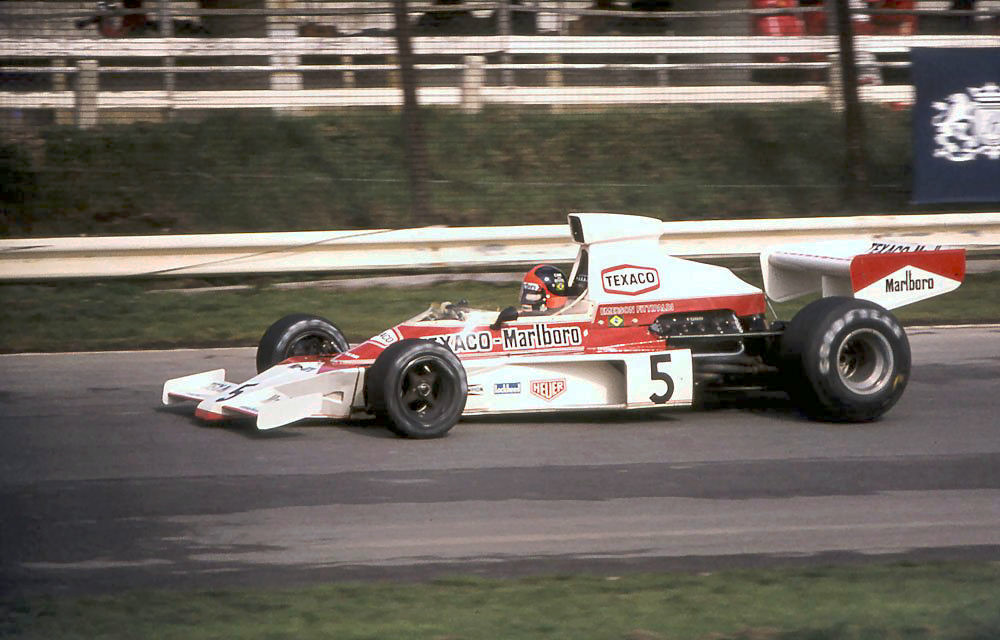
Emerson Fittipaldi finished in second place for McLaren.

The 1974 British Grand Prix (formally the John Player Grand Prix) was a Formula One motor race held at Brands Hatch on 20 July 1974. It was race 10 of 15 in both the 1974 World Championship of Drivers and the 1974 International Cup for Formula One Manufacturers. The 75-lap race was won by Jody Scheckter, driving a Tyrrell-Ford, with Emerson Fittipaldi second in a McLaren-Ford and Jacky Ickx third in a Lotus-Ford. Niki Lauda completed just 73 laps but was allowed an extra lap after the team protested his exit from the pit lane was blocked after a late wheel change. He initially classified ninth, but was awarded fifth place after appeal.

== Classification ==
=== Qualifying ===
Pos.	Driver	Constructor	Time/Gap
1	(Austria) Niki Lauda	Ferrari	1:19.7
2	(Sweden) Ronnie Peterson	Lotus-Ford	+0.0
3	(South Africa) Jody Scheckter	Tyrrell-Ford	+0.4
4	(Argentina) Carlos Reutemann	Brabham-Ford	+0.5
5	(United Kingdom) Tom Pryce	Shadow-Ford	+0.6
6	(United Kingdom) James Hunt	Hesketh-Ford	+0.6
7	(Switzerland) Clay Regazzoni	Ferrari	+0.6
8	(Brazil) Emerson Fittipaldi	McLaren-Ford	+0.8
9	(West Germany) Hans-Joachim Stuck	March-Ford	+1.0
10	(France) Patrick Depailler	Tyrrell-Ford	+1.1
11	(United Kingdom) Mike Hailwood	McLaren-Ford	+1.5
12	(Belgium) Jacky Ickx	Lotus-Ford	+1.5
13	(United Kingdom) John Watson	Brabham-Ford	+1.6
14	(France) François Migault	BRM	+1.7
15	(Italy) Arturo Merzario	FWRC-Ford	+1.9
16	(France) Jean-Pierre Jarier	Shadow-Ford	+1.9
17	(West Germany) Jochen Mass	Surtees-Ford	+1.9
18	(Italy) Vittorio Brambilla	March-Ford	+1.9
19	(New Zealand) Denny Hulme	McLaren-Ford	+2.0
20	(Brazil) Carlos Pace	Brabham-Ford	+2.0
21	(United Kingdom) Peter Gethin	Lola-Ford	+2.0
22	(United Kingdom) Graham Hill	Lola-Ford	+2.2
23	(France) Jean-Pierre Beltoise	BRM	+2.4
24	(France) Henri Pescarolo	BRM	+2.5
25	(Australia) Tim Schenken	Trojan-Ford	+2.7
26	(United Kingdom) David Purley	Token-Ford	+3.0
27	(United Kingdom) Derek Bell	Surtees-Ford	+3.0
28	(Denmark) Tom Belsø	FWRC-Ford	+3.6
29	(Italy) Lella Lombardi	Brabham-Ford	+3.6
30	(Australia) Vern Schuppan	Ensign-Ford	+3.7
31	(New Zealand) John Nicholson	Lyncar-Ford	+3.9
32	(New Zealand) Howden Ganley	Maki-Ford	+4.0
33	(United Kingdom) Mike Wilds	March-Ford	+4.4
34	(Finland) Leo Kinnunen	Surtees-Ford	+5.9
35	(United Kingdom) Guy Edwards	Lola-Ford	+15.2

*Positions with a pink background indicate drivers that failed to qualify

=== Race ===
Pos	No	Driver	Constructor	Laps	Time/Retired	Grid	Points
1	3	(South Africa) Jody Scheckter	Tyrrell-Ford	75	1:43:02.2	3	9
2	5	(Brazil) Emerson Fittipaldi	McLaren-Ford	75	+ 15.3	8	6
3	2	(Belgium) Jacky Ickx	Lotus-Ford	75	+ 1:01.5	12	4
4	11	(Switzerland) Clay Regazzoni	Ferrari	75	+ 1:07.2	7	3
5	12	(Austria) Niki Lauda	Ferrari	74	+ 1 Lap	1	2
6	7	(Argentina) Carlos Reutemann	Brabham-Ford	74	+ 1 Lap	4	1
7	6	(New Zealand) Denny Hulme	McLaren-Ford	74	+ 1 Lap	19	
8	16	(United Kingdom) Tom Pryce	Shadow-Ford	74	+ 1 Lap	5	
9	8	(Brazil) Carlos Pace	Brabham-Ford	74	+ 1 Lap	20	
10	1	(Sweden) Ronnie Peterson	Lotus-Ford	73	+ 2 Laps	2	
11	28	(United Kingdom) John Watson	Brabham-Ford	73	+ 2 Laps	13	
12	14	(France) Jean-Pierre Beltoise	BRM	72	+ 3 Laps	23	
13	26	(United Kingdom) Graham Hill	Lola-Ford	69	+ 6 Laps	22	
14	19	(West Germany) Jochen Mass	Surtees-Ford	68	+ 7 Laps	17	
Ret	15	(France) Henri Pescarolo	BRM	64	Engine	24	
NC	37	(France) François Migault	BRM	62	+ 13 Laps	14	
Ret	33	(United Kingdom) Mike Hailwood	McLaren-Ford	57	Spun Off	11	
Ret	17	(France) Jean-Pierre Jarier	Shadow-Ford	45	Suspension	16	
Ret	9	(West Germany) Hans Joachim Stuck	March-Ford	36	Accident	9	
Ret	4	(France) Patrick Depailler	Tyrrell-Ford	35	Engine	10	
Ret	20	(Italy) Arturo Merzario	Iso-Marlboro-Ford	25	Engine	15	
Ret	10	(Italy) Vittorio Brambilla	March-Ford	17	Fuel System	18	
Ret	23	(Australia) Tim Schenken	Trojan-Ford	6	Suspension	25	
Ret	24	(United Kingdom) James Hunt	Hesketh-Ford	2	Suspension	6	
Ret	27	(United Kingdom) Peter Gethin	Lola-Ford	0	Physical	21	
DNQ	42	(United Kingdom) David Purley	Token-Ford				
DNQ	18	(United Kingdom) Derek Bell	Surtees-Ford				
DNQ	21	(Denmark) Tom Belsø	Iso-Marlboro-Ford				
DNQ	208	(Italy) Lella Lombardi	Brabham-Ford				
DNQ	22	(Australia) Vern Schuppan	Ensign-Ford				
DNQ	29	(New Zealand) John Nicholson	Lyncar-Ford				
DNQ	25	(New Zealand) Howden Ganley	Maki-Ford				
DNQ	35	(United Kingdom) Mike Wilds	March-Ford				
DNQ	43	(Finland) Leo Kinnunen	Surtees-Ford				
DNQ	27	(United Kingdom) Guy Edwards	Lola-Ford		Driven by Gethin		

== Notes ==
- This was the Formula One World Championship debut for British driver Mike Wilds, New Zealand driver John Nicholson and Italian driver Lella Lombardi - the second woman to enter in Formula One.
- This was the final F1 race for 1971 Italian GP winner Peter Gethin.
- This was the 50th Grand Prix start for a South African driver.
- It was also the 100th Grand Prix start for an Austrian driver. In those 100 races, Austrian drivers won 8 Grands Prix, achieved 18 podium finishes, 16 pole positions, 5 fastest laps, 2 Grand Slams and won 1 World Championship.
- This was the Formula One World Championship debut for British constructor Lyncar and Japanese constructor Maki. It was also the 25th Grand Prix start for Iso-Marlboro - entered by Frank Williams - and the 50th Grand Prix start for Tyrrell.
- This was the 8th win of the British Grand Prix by a Ford-powered car. It broke the previous record set by Ferrari at the 1961 British Grand Prix.

== Championship standings after the race ==
Drivers' Championship standings

	Pos	Driver	Points
	1	(Austria) **Niki Lauda***	38
1	2	(Brazil) **Emerson Fittipaldi***	37
1	3	(South Africa) **Jody Scheckter***	35
2	4	(Switzerland) **Clay Regazzoni***	35
	5	(Sweden) **Ronnie Peterson***	19

Constructors' Championship standings

	Pos	Constructor	Points
1	1	(United Kingdom) **McLaren-Ford***	49 (51)
1	2	(Italy) **Ferrari***	48
	3	(United Kingdom) **Tyrrell-Ford***	39
	4	(United Kingdom) **Lotus-Ford***	26
	5	(United Kingdom) **Brabham-Ford***	11

- Note: Only the top five positions are included for both sets of standings. Only the best 7 results from the first 8 races and the best 6 results from the last 7 races counted towards the Championship. Numbers without parentheses are Championship points; numbers in parentheses are total points scored.
- Competitors in bold and marked with an asterisk still had a theoretical chance of becoming World Champion.

Previous race: 1974 French Grand Prix	FIA Formula One World Championship; 1974 season	Next race: 1974 German Grand Prix
Previous race: 1973 British Grand Prix	British Grand Prix	Next race: 1975 British Grand Prix
