= Philippe Renault =

French racing driver

Philippe Renault (born 26 June 1959) is a French former racing driver.
