= Virgin Cars =

British Internet automobile retailer

Virgin Cars (UK) Limited
- Company type: Limited
- Industry: Automotive industry
- Founded: 2000; United Kingdom
- Founder: Richard Branson; Ian Lancaster
- Defunct: 2005
- Headquarters: 120 Campden Hill Road, London, United Kingdom
- Number of locations: Salford Quays, City of Salford (Showroom)
- Area served: United Kingdom
- Parent: Virgin Group
- Website: www.virgincars.com (via archive.org)

Virgin Cars Ltd was an internet automobile retailer, established by British entrepreneur Sir Richard Branson and co-founded by Ian Lancaster in 2000 as part of the Virgin brand of companies.

Branson predicted the company would sell 24,000 cars in its first year, with a £300m turnover. By October 2000, the company had sold more than 2,000 cars, generating £30 million. In 2001, the company launched a subsidiary, Virgin Bikes. By 2003, the company had still sold only 12,000 cars. In May of that year, Branson opened Virgin Cars' first showroom in Salford, Greater Manchester.

In 2005, the company stopped all operations and ceased trading.
