= Shellsport International Series =

Shellsport G8 International Series
- Category: Single-seaters
- Country: United Kingdom
- Inaugural season: 1976
- Folded: 1977
- Last Drivers' champion: (United Kingdom) Tony Trimmer

The Shellsport G8 International Series was a Formula Libre motor racing competition held in the United Kingdom. Contested in both 1976 and 1977, the series catered for Formula One, Formula Two, Formula 5000 and Formula Atlantic cars competing together in the same races.

== Champions ==
Season	Driver	Car	Engine	Poles	Wins	Podiums	Fastest Laps	Points	Pt. Margin
1976	(United Kingdom) David Purley	Chevron B30	Cosworth	4	6	7	7	188	77
1977	(United Kingdom) Tony Trimmer	Surtees TS19	Cosworth	6	5	9	8	181	52
