= 1975 British Grand Prix =

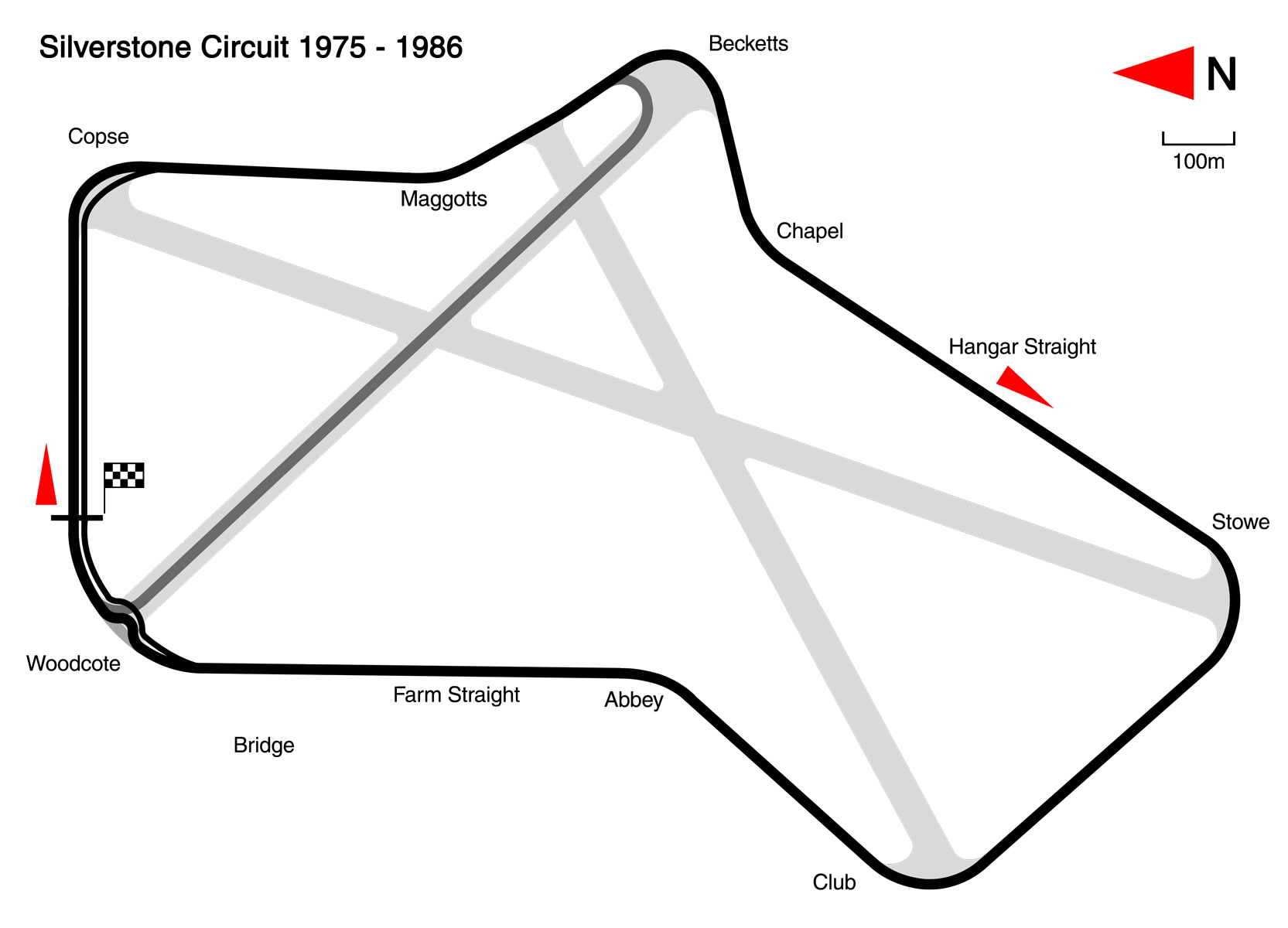

Race details
- Date: 19 July 1975
- Official name: John Player Grand Prix
- Location: Silverstone Circuit, Northamptonshire, Great Britain
- Course: Permanent racing facility
- Course length: 4.719 km (2.932 miles)
- Distance: 56 laps, 264.264 km (164.192 miles)
- Weather: Sunny, then overcast, then heavy rain

Pole position
Driver	(United Kingdom) Tom Pryce	Shadow-Ford
- Time: 1:19.36

Fastest lap
Driver	(Switzerland) Clay Regazzoni	Ferrari
- Time: 1:20.9 on lap 16

Podium
First	(Brazil) Emerson Fittipaldi	McLaren-Ford
Second	(Brazil) Carlos Pace	Brabham-Ford
Third	(South Africa) Jody Scheckter	Tyrrell-Ford

The 1975 British Grand Prix (formally the John Player Grand Prix) was a Formula One motor race held at Silverstone on 19 July 1975. It was race 10 of 14 in both the 1975 World Championship of Drivers and the 1975 International Cup for Formula One Manufacturers. It was the 30th British Grand Prix to be held since the race was first held in 1926 and the 17th time the race had been held at Silverstone. The race was held over 56 of the scheduled 67 laps of the four kilometre venue for a race distance of 264 kilometres. This was the first race that used the traffic light system with coloured lights (red and green) at the start (system used until the 1995 Australian Grand Prix).

The results were overshadowed by a heavy hail storm from Lap 53, which caused three out of the top four cars (Jody Scheckter, James Hunt, and Mark Donohue), to aquaplane and crash in the same corner, bringing an early finish to the race, and a significant absence on the podium. A number of other cars crashed at the same corner as well, including Wilson Fittipaldi, Jochen Mass, and John Watson. The race results were finalised the lap after the lap most cars crashed, giving Brazilian Emerson Fittipaldi, who had been the race leader prior to the storm, a one lap win in his McLaren M23. Carlos Pace, who was one of the crashers in his Brabham BT44B was classified in second position with another of the crashers, Tyrrell 007 driver Jody Scheckter classified third.

== Race summary ==
A new chicane had been installed at Woodcote Corner, bringing complaints from the purists but also arguments that it was necessary in the interests of safety. Tom Pryce gained his only career pole position in his home race, whilst the Ferraris were on the second row, with James Hunt languishing on the fifth row.

Graham Hill, who had already announced his retirement as a driver after 17 seasons and 176 races after failing in his attempt to qualify in Monaco, made a farewell lap one hour before the start of the race (without overalls and helmet), and concentrated on the leadership of his Embassy Hill team.

From the start – in which a lights system was being used for the first time in any Grand Prix, replacing the traditional national flag – Carlos Pace led from Pryce.

Following the hail storm, only six cars were running at the end. The RAC declared the race finished officially on the lap after the lap when most cars were running – lap 56. Ferrari, with both of their cars stuck on lap 54 in the classification protested, but the RAC threw these protests out and three days later, the provisional results were confirmed.

The win was the 14th and final win of Fittipaldi's career which had included two world championships. He would continue racing in Formula One until 1980. The win also vaulted Fittipaldi past Carlos Reutemann into second place in the championship, 14 points behind Lauda.

== Classification ==
=== Qualifying classification ===
Pos.	No	Driver	Constructor	Time	Gap
1	16	(United Kingdom) Tom Pryce	Shadow-Ford	1:19.36	
2	8	(Brazil) Carlos Pace	Brabham-Ford	1:19.50	+0.14
3	12	(Austria) Niki Lauda	Ferrari	1:19.54	+0.18
4	11	(Switzerland) Clay Regazzoni	Ferrari	1:19.55	+0.19
5	9	(Italy) Vittorio Brambilla	March-Ford	1:19.63	+0.27
6	3	(South Africa) Jody Scheckter	Tyrrell-Ford	1:19.81	+0.45
7	1	(Brazil) Emerson Fittipaldi	McLaren-Ford	1:19.91	+0.55
8	7	(Argentina) Carlos Reutemann	Brabham-Ford	1:20.04	+0.68
9	24	(United Kingdom) James Hunt	Hesketh-Ford	1:20.14	+0.78
10	2	(West Germany) Jochen Mass	McLaren-Ford	1:20.18	+0.82
11	17	(France) Jean-Pierre Jarier	Shadow-Ford	1:20.33	+0.97
12	27	(United States) Mario Andretti	Parnelli-Ford	1:20.36	+1.00
13	23	(United Kingdom) Tony Brise	Hill-Ford	1:20.41	+1.05
14	10	(West Germany) Hans-Joachim Stuck	March-Ford	1:20.46	+1.10
15	28	(United States) Mark Donohue	March-Ford	1:20.50	+1.14
16	5	(Sweden) Ronnie Peterson	Lotus-Ford	1:20.58	+1.22
17	4	(France) Patrick Depailler	Tyrrell-Ford	1:20.60	+1.24
18	18	(United Kingdom) John Watson	Surtees-Ford	1:20.83	+1.47
19	21	(France) Jacques Laffite	Williams-Ford	1:21.01	+1.65
20	22	(Australia) Alan Jones	Hill-Ford	1:21.19	+1.83
21	15	(United Kingdom) Brian Henton	Lotus-Ford	1:21.36	+2.00
22	29	(Italy) Lella Lombardi	March-Ford	1:21.60	+2.24
23	19	(United Kingdom) Dave Morgan	Surtees-Ford	1:21.65	+2.29
24	30	(Brazil) Wilson Fittipaldi	Fittipaldi-Ford	1:21.67	+2.31
25	6	(United Kingdom) Jim Crawford	Lotus-Ford	1:21.86	+2.50
26	32	(New Zealand) John Nicholson	Lyncar-Ford	1:22.86	+3.50
27	31	(Netherlands) Roelof Wunderink	Ensign-Ford	1:25.02	+5.66
28	35	(Japan) Hiroshi Fushida	Maki-Ford	1:26.61	+7.25

*Positions in red indicate entries that failed to qualify.

=== Race classification ===
Pos	No	Driver	Constructor	Laps	Time/Retired	Grid	Points
1	1	(Brazil) Emerson Fittipaldi	McLaren-Ford	56	1:22:05.0	7	9
2	8	(Brazil) Carlos Pace	Brabham-Ford	55	Accident	2	6
3	3	(South Africa) Jody Scheckter	Tyrrell-Ford	55	Accident	6	4
4	24	(United Kingdom) James Hunt	Hesketh-Ford	55	Accident	9	3
5	28	(United States) Mark Donohue	March-Ford	55	Accident	15	2
6	9	(Italy) Vittorio Brambilla	March-Ford	55	+ 1 Lap	5	1
7	2	(West Germany) Jochen Mass	McLaren-Ford	55	Accident	10	
8	12	(Austria) Niki Lauda	Ferrari	54	+ 2 Laps	3	
9	4	(France) Patrick Depailler	Tyrrell-Ford	54	Accident	17	
10	22	(Australia) Alan Jones	Hill-Ford	54	+ 2 Laps	20	
11	18	(United Kingdom) John Watson	Surtees-Ford	54	Accident	18	
12	27	(United States) Mario Andretti	Parnelli-Ford	54	+ 2 Laps	12	
13	11	(Switzerland) Clay Regazzoni	Ferrari	54	+ 2 Laps	4	
14	17	(France) Jean-Pierre Jarier	Shadow-Ford	53	Accident	11	
15	23	(United Kingdom) Tony Brise	Hill-Ford	53	Accident	13	
16	15	(United Kingdom) Brian Henton	Lotus-Ford	53	Accident	21	
17	32	(New Zealand) John Nicholson	Lyncar-Ford	51	Accident	26	
18	19	(United Kingdom) Dave Morgan	Surtees-Ford	50	Accident	23	
19	30	(Brazil) Wilson Fittipaldi	Fittipaldi-Ford	50	Accident	24	
Ret	10	(West Germany) Hans-Joachim Stuck	March-Ford	45	Accident	14	
Ret	6	(United Kingdom) Jim Crawford	Lotus-Ford	28	Accident	25	
Ret	16	(United Kingdom) Tom Pryce	Shadow-Ford	20	Accident	1	
Ret	29	(Italy) Lella Lombardi	March-Ford	18	Engine	22	
Ret	5	(Sweden) Ronnie Peterson	Lotus-Ford	7	Engine	16	
Ret	21	(France) Jacques Laffite	Williams-Ford	5	Gearbox	19	
Ret	7	(Argentina) Carlos Reutemann	Brabham-Ford	4	Engine	8	
DNQ	31	(Netherlands) Roelof Wunderink	Ensign-Ford				
DNQ	35	(Japan) Hiroshi Fushida	Maki-Ford				

== Notes ==
- This was the Formula One World Championship debut for British drivers Jim Crawford, Brian Henton and Dave Morgan.

== Championship standings after the race ==
Drivers' Championship standings

	Pos	Driver	Points
	1	(Austria) **Niki Lauda***	47
1	2	(Brazil) **Emerson Fittipaldi***	33
1	3	(United Kingdom) **James Hunt***	25
1	4	(Argentina) **Carlos Reutemann***	25
	5	(Brazil) **Carlos Pace***	24

Constructors' Championship standings

Pos	Constructor	Points
1	(Italy) **Ferrari***	50
2	(United Kingdom) **Brabham-Ford***	42 (44)
3	(United Kingdom) **McLaren-Ford***	39.5
4	(United Kingdom) **Hesketh-Ford***	25
5	(United Kingdom) **Tyrrell-Ford***	24

- Note: Only the top five positions are included for both sets of standings. Only the best 6 results from the first 7 races and the best 6 results from the last 7 races counted towards the Championship. Numbers without parentheses are Championship points; numbers in parentheses are total points scored.
- Competitors in bold and marked with an asterisk still had a theoretical chance of becoming World Champion.

Previous race: 1975 French Grand Prix	FIA Formula One World Championship; 1975 season	Next race: 1975 German Grand Prix
Previous race: 1974 British Grand Prix	British Grand Prix	Next race: 1976 British Grand Prix
