= John Nicholson (racing driver) =

New Zealand racing driver (1941–2017)

- Born: 6 October 1941; Auckland, New Zealand
- Died: 19 September 2017 (aged 75); Clarks Beach, Auckland, New Zealand

Formula One World Championship career
- Nationality: (New Zealand) New Zealander
- Active years: 1974–1975
- Team: Lyncar
- Entries: 2 (1 start)
- Championships: 0
- Wins: 0
- Podiums: 0
- Career points: 0
- Pole positions: 0
- Fastest laps: 0
- First entry: 1974 British Grand Prix
- Last entry: 1975 British Grand Prix

John Barry Nicholson (6 October 1941 – 19 September 2017) was a racing driver from Auckland, New Zealand. He participated in two Formula One World Championship Grands Prix, debuting on 20 July 1974. He scored no championship points.

Nicholson was the 1973 and 1974 British Formula Atlantic champion, using a Lyncar chassis and in his 'day job' was an engine-builder for McLaren. Nicholson also worked for Cosworth, Lotus and Embassy Hill, and he prepared a Saab engine for use in a Reynard Formula Three car.

Following his Formula Atlantic success, Nicholson commissioned Martin Slater of Lyncar to build him a Formula One car, despite, by this time, having established his own engine building business, which meant he was unable to commit to a full grand prix season. His race entries, therefore, were mainly in non-championship races. He entered the British Grand Prix in 1974 and 1975 and qualified for the latter race. He was classified 17th, five laps behind, despite crashing in the heavy storm towards the end of the race. Nicholson subsequently planned a further and stronger attempt at Formula One with a privateer McLaren M23 but the purchase of the chassis fell through. He did continue in both Formula Two and Formula 5000 in 1976 before racing in his native New Zealand in January 1977.

After retiring from racing, Nicholson turned his sporting attention to powerboat racing as well as continuing with his business interests.

Nicholson died in 2017 at the age of 75.

== Complete Formula One World Championship results ==
(key)

Year	Entrant	Chassis	Engine	1	2	3	4	5	6	7	8	9	10	11	12	13	14	15	WDC	Points
1974	Pinch (Plant) Ltd.	Lyncar 006	Cosworth V8	ARG	BRA	RSA	ESP	BEL	MON	SWE	NED	FRA	GBR; DNQ	GER	AUT	ITA	CAN	USA	NC	0
1975	Pinch (Plant) Ltd.	Lyncar 006	Cosworth V8	ARG	BRA	RSA	ESP	MON	BEL	SWE	NED	FRA	GBR; 17	GER	AUT	ITA	USA		NC	0
