= Penske Grand Prix results =

F1 team statistics

The table below details World Championship Grand Prix results for the Penske Formula One team. The second table includes results from privately owned Penske cars in World Championship Grands Prix.

== Formula One World Championship results ==
=== Works entries ===
(key) (results in bold indicate pole position; results in italics indicate fastest lap)

Year	Chassis	Engine	Tyres	Drivers	1	2	3	4	5	6	7	8	9	10	11	12	13	14	15	16	WCC	Points
1974	Penske PC1	Ford Cosworth DFV 3.0 V8	G		ARG	BRA	RSA	ESP	BEL	MON	SWE	NED	FRA	GBR	GER	AUT	ITA	CAN	USA		NC	0
1974	Penske PC1	Ford Cosworth DFV 3.0 V8	G	(United States) Mark Donohue														12	Ret		NC	0
1975	March 751	Ford Cosworth DFV 3.0 V8	G		ARG	BRA	RSA	ESP	MON	BEL	SWE	NED	FRA	GBR	GER	AUT	ITA	USA			—N/a^{1}	
1975	March 751	Ford Cosworth DFV 3.0 V8	G	(United States) Mark Donohue										5	Ret	DNS					—N/a^{1}	
1975	Penske PC1	Ford Cosworth DFV 3.0 V8	G	(United States) Mark Donohue	7	Ret	8	Ret	Ret	11	5	8	Ret								12th	2
1975	Penske PC1	Ford Cosworth DFV 3.0 V8	G	(United Kingdom) John Watson														9			12th	2
1976	Penske PC3; Penske PC4	Ford Cosworth DFV 3.0 V8	G		BRA	RSA	USW	ESP	BEL	MON	SWE	FRA	GBR	GER	AUT	NED	ITA	CAN	USA	JPN	5th	20
1976	Penske PC3; Penske PC4	Ford Cosworth DFV 3.0 V8	G	(United Kingdom) John Watson	Ret	5	NC	Ret	7	10	Ret	3	3	7	1	Ret	11	10	6	Ret	5th	20

Notes

- **^1** – Not entered as a Constructor.

=== Results of other Penske cars ===
(key) (results in bold indicate pole position; results in italics indicate fastest lap)

Year	Entrant	Chassis	Engine	Tyres	Drivers	1	2	3	4	5	6	7	8	9	10	11	12	13	14	15	16	17
1976	F&S Properties	Penske PC3	Ford Cosworth DFV 3.0 V8	G		BRA	RSA	USW	ESP	BEL	MON	SWE	FRA	GBR	GER	AUT	NED	ITA	CAN	USA	JPN	
1976	F&S Properties	Penske PC3	Ford Cosworth DFV 3.0 V8	G	(Netherlands) Boy Hayje												Ret					
1977	ATS Racing Team	Penske PC4	Ford Cosworth DFV 3.0 V8	G		ARG	BRA	RSA	USW	ESP	MON	BEL	SWE	FRA	GBR	GER	AUT	NED	ITA	USA	CAN	JPN
1977	ATS Racing Team	Penske PC4	Ford Cosworth DFV 3.0 V8	G	(France) Jean-Pierre Jarier				6	DNQ	11	11	8	Ret	9	Ret	14	Ret	Ret			
1977	ATS Racing Team	Penske PC4	Ford Cosworth DFV 3.0 V8	G	(Austria) Hans Binder												12	8	DNQ			
1977	ATS Racing Team	Penske PC4	Ford Cosworth DFV 3.0 V8	G	(Germany) Hans Heyer											DSQ						
1977	Interscope Racing	Penske PC4	Ford Cosworth DFV 3.0 V8	G	(United States) Danny Ongais															Ret	7	

=== Non-Championship results ===
(key) (results in bold indicate pole position; results in italics indicate fastest lap)

Year	Entrant	Chassis	Engine	Driver	1	2	3	4	5	6	7	8
1971	Sunoco Penske Racing	Lola T192	Chevrolet 5.0 V8		ARG	ROC	QUE	SPR	INT	RIN	OUL	VIC
1971	Sunoco Penske Racing	Lola T192	Chevrolet 5.0 V8	(United States) Mark Donohue			14					
1975	Penske Cars	Penske PC1	Ford Cosworth DFV 3.0 V8		ROC	INT	SUI					
1975	Penske Cars	Penske PC1	Ford Cosworth DFV 3.0 V8	(United States) Mark Donohue	Ret	6						
1976	Citibank Team Penske	Penske PC3	Ford Cosworth DFV 3.0 V8		ROC	INT						
1976	Citibank Team Penske	Penske PC3	Ford Cosworth DFV 3.0 V8	(United Kingdom) John Watson	Ret							
1977	Hexagon Racing	Penske PC3	Ford Cosworth DFV 3.0 V8		ROC							
1977	Hexagon Racing	Penske PC3	Ford Cosworth DFV 3.0 V8	(United Kingdom) Bob Evans	11							
