= Penske PC1 =

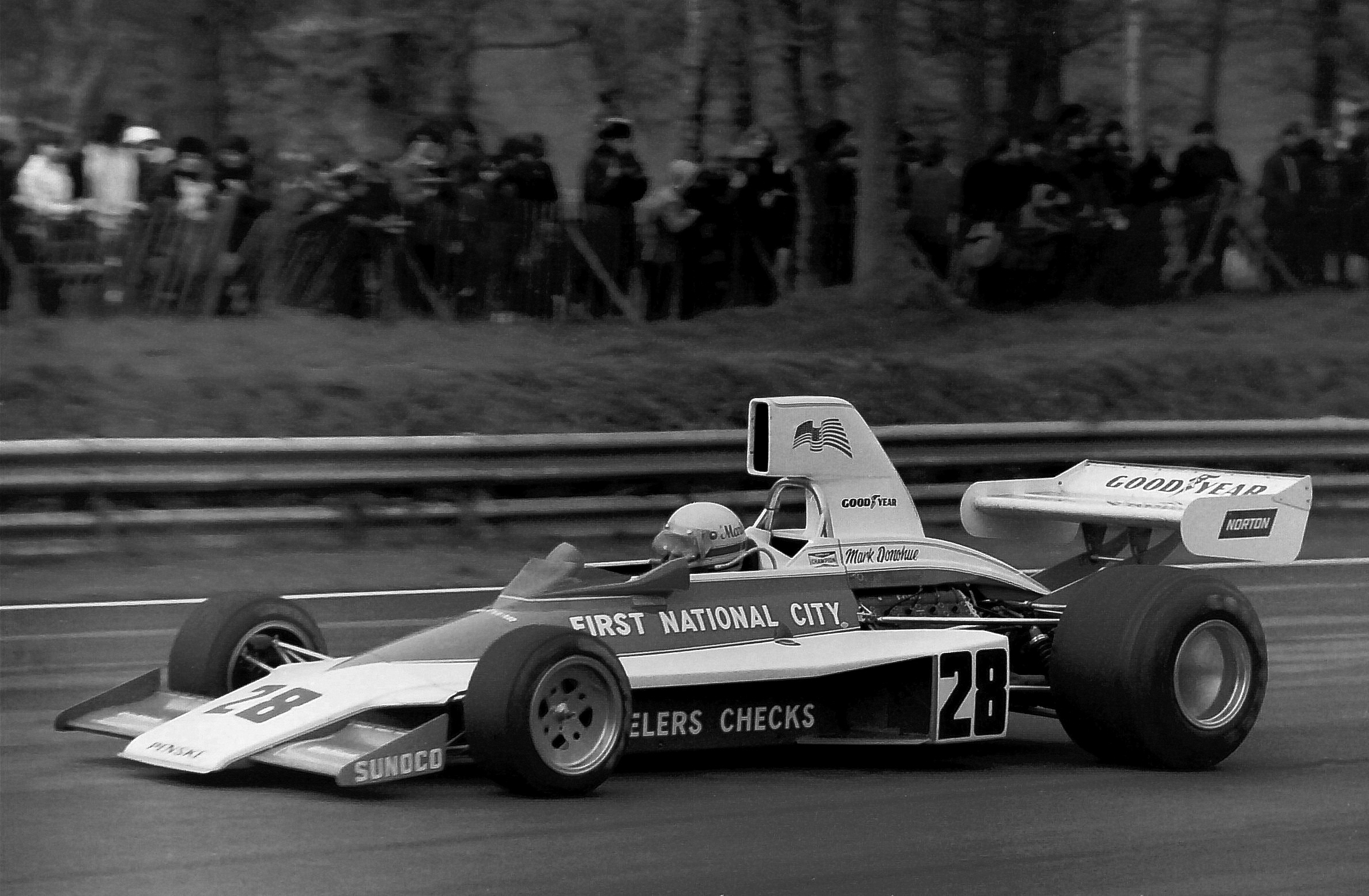
- Penske PC1 driven by Mark Donohue during the 1975 Race of Champions
- Category: Formula One
- Constructor: Team Penske
- Designer: Geoff Ferris
- Successor: PC3

Technical specifications
- Chassis: Aluminium monocoque
- Axle track: Front: 1,473 mm (58.0 in); Rear: 1,524 mm (60.0 in)
- Wheelbase: 2,540 mm (100 in)
- Engine: Ford Cosworth DFV 2,993 cc (182.6 cu in) V8 naturally aspirated Mid-engine, longitudinally mounted
- Transmission: Hewland FG 400 5-speed manual
- Weight: 582 kg (1,283 lb)
- Fuel: Sunoco
- Tyres: Goodyear

Competition history
- Notable entrants: Penske Cars
- Notable drivers: (United States) Mark Donohue (United Kingdom) John Watson
- Debut: 1974 Canadian Grand Prix
Races	Wins	Poles	F/Laps
12	0	0	0
- Constructors' Championships: 0
- Drivers' Championships: 0

The Penske PC1 was a Formula One racing car developed and raced by Penske Racing during the 1974 and 1975 Formula One seasons. The car was designed by Geoff Ferris, and was raced by drivers Mark Donohue and John Watson. The PC1 entered and competed in 12 Grands Prix, and was replaced by the Penske PC3 in the 1976 season.

== Development ==
Penske Racing (later renamed to Team Penske) was formed in 1968 by American motorsport entrepreneur Roger Penske. The team remains the last American team to win a Formula One Grand Prix (the 1976 Austrian Grand Prix).

In 1973, Penske purchased the facilities of small racing car manufacturer McRae Cars Ltd in Poole, Dorset in the UK. McRae Cars had been founded by New Zealand racing driver and constructor Graeme McRae, a designer and competitor in the F5000 racing formula. Starting with just six employees, Penske appointed his then Porsche Can-Am team manager, Swiss Heinz Hofer, as F1 manager, and Geoff Ferris as chief engineer/designer. Rounding-out the F1 team was Karl Kainhofer, Penske's long-standing chief mechanic and engine builder, who joined the UK operation in mid 1974.

By late summer in 1974, the team unveiled their first car, named the PC1, an aluminium monocoque chassis built around a Ford Cosworth DFV 3.0-litre V8 engine and a Hewland FG 400 gearbox. Penske Racing entered Formula One at the 1974 Canadian Grand Prix held at Mosport Park, Ontario, using seasoned driver Mark Donohue, who had driven for Penske in Indycar before being elevated to team manager of the US Penske operations. Donohue had retired from motorsport at the end of the 1973 season, but returned to full-time competitive driving for Penske in Formula One. Donohue had previously raced in Formula One in a Penske-sponsored McLaren in 1971, competing in two races, the Canadian Grand Prix and the United States Grand Prix.

== Racing history ==
=== 1974 ===
The PC1 made its debut at the 1974 Canadian Grand Prix with Donohue qualifying 24th and finishing 12th. Donohue retired from his and Penske's home race at the subsequent 1974 United States Grand Prix held at Watkins Glen after qualifying 14th, failing to finish the race due to rear suspension failure.

The Penske team scored no World Championship points during the 1974 year.

=== 1975 ===
Roger Penske planned a full season with the PC1 for 1975, but it turned out to be a difficult season for the Penske team and a tragic one for Donohue.

The first race of 1975 was the 1975 Argentine Grand Prix and Donohue finished seventh. Donohue retired from the Brazilian Grand Prix because of a handling issue. The South African Grand Prix saw Donohue finish eighth. Donohue retired from the Spanish Grand Prix when he and Alan Jones (Hesketh) crashed after hitting oil dropped onto the circuit by the car of Jody Scheckter (Tyrrell). The Monaco Grand Prix saw Donohue abandon the race after he had an accident. Donohue finished 11th at Belgium. The Swedish Grand Prix saw Donohue finish fifth. The American finished eighth at Holland. The French Grand Prix saw Donohue retire from the race due to transmission failure.

The PC1 was retired after the French Grand Prix, and Penske entered a March 751 for the next three races. Donohue badly crashed the 751 in the final practice session of the Austrian Grand Prix and suffered severe concussion. He regained consciousness briefly at the circuit, but fell unconscious again at the hospital. An emergency operation to relieve pressure on his brain was unsuccessful, and he died from his injuries. A track marshall was also killed in this accident.

The Penske team chose to miss the Italian Grand Prix, returning for the United States Grand Prix. For this race the March 751 was abandoned in favour of the team's newly developed Penske PC3 driven by Northern Irish driver John Watson. Watson used the car in practice sessions and qualified 12th, but technical problems with the car forced him to switch to the spare PC1 for the actual race. Watson finished ninth in the PC1.

The Penske team scored two World Championship points during the 1975 year.

== Complete Formula One World Championship results ==
(key)

Year	Entrant	Engine	Tyres	Drivers	1	2	3	4	5	6	7	8	9	10	11	12	13	14	15	Points	WCC
1974	Penske Cars	Ford Cosworth DFV 3.0 V8	G		ARG	BRA	RSA	ESP	BEL	MON	SWE	NED	FRA	GBR	GER	AUT	ITA	CAN	USA	0	-
1974	Penske Cars	Ford Cosworth DFV 3.0 V8	G	Mark Donohue														12	Ret	0	-
1975	Penske Cars	Ford Cosworth DFV 3.0 V8	G		ARG	BRA	RSA	ESP	MON	BEL	SWE	NED	FRA	GBR	GER	AUT	ITA	USA		2	12th
1975	Penske Cars	Ford Cosworth DFV 3.0 V8	G	Mark Donohue	7	Ret	8	Ret	Ret	11	5	8	Ret							2	12th
1975	Penske Cars	Ford Cosworth DFV 3.0 V8	G	John Watson														9		2	12th

== Non-Championship results ==
(key) (Races in bold indicate pole position) (Races in italics indicate fastest lap)

Year	Entrant	Engine	Driver	Tyres	1	2	3
1975	Penske Cars	Ford Cosworth DFV 3.0 V8		**G**	ROC	INT	SUI
1975	Penske Cars	Ford Cosworth DFV 3.0 V8	Mark Donohue	**G**	Ret	6	
