= Goldie Hexagon Racing =

- Full name: John Goldie Racing with Hexagon
- Base: United Kingdom
- Founder(s): Paul Michaels
- Noted staff: Paul Michaels
- Noted drivers: (United Kingdom) John Watson (Brazil) Carlos Pace

Formula One World Championship career
- First entry: 1974 Argentine Grand Prix
- Races entered: 15
- Constructors: Brabham
- Engines: Cosworth DFV
- Drivers' Championships: 0
- Race victories: 0
- Pole positions: 0
- Fastest laps: 0
- Final entry: 1974 United States Grand Prix

Goldie Hexagon Racing was a motor racing team from the United Kingdom, founded by Paul Michaels. It raced in Formula One in 1974, using customer Brabham cars.

== Formula One ==
Goldie Hexagon Racing first entered a Formula One race in 1972, at the non-Championship World Championship Victory Race. They entered a March 721 for British racing driver John Watson. Watson qualified the car in tenth position and finished the race in sixth position. In 1974, Goldie Hexagon Racing returned to Formula One and raced a full Championship season, again with Watson, entering Brabham cars. The season started in Argentina, where Watson qualified the car in 20th position and finished 12th. In Brazil Watson qualified in 15th position, but retired on lap 27. He also failed to finish in South Africa. In Spain Watson qualified in 15th position and finished 11th, and he finished in the same position in Belgium. In Monaco Watson scored Goldie Hexagon Racing's first World Championship points, when he finished in sixth position. In Sweden Watson finished in 11th position. In the Netherlands Watson finished 7th. In France Goldie Hexagon Racing entered two cars, one for Watson and one for Carlos Pace. While Watson finished in 16th position, Pace failed to qualify. Two races later, in Austria, Watson finished in fourth position, scoring three World Championship points. In Italy Watson qualified the car in fourth position, his highest of the season, but only finished in seventh place. In the USA, at the last race of the season, Watson finished in fifth position, scoring a further two Championship points. The 1974 United States Grand Prix was the last Formula One race for Goldie Hexagon Racing.

The team was in negotiations with the French cigarette manufacturer Gitanes to sponsor an entry for 2 cars in the 1975 F1 season, for Watson and Jean-Pierre Beltoise. This did not happen and the team last competed in Formula 1 in 1974.

== Race results ==
=== Complete Formula One World Championship results ===
(key) (results in bold indicate pole position; results in italics indicate fastest lap)

Year	Chassis	Engine(s)	Tyres	Drivers	1	2	3	4	5	6	7	8	9	10	11	12	13	14	15
1974	Brabham BT42	Ford Cosworth DFV 3.0 V8	**F**		ARG	BRA	RSA	ESP	BEL	MON	SWE	NED	FRA	GBR	GER	AUT	ITA	CAN	USA
1974	Brabham BT42	Ford Cosworth DFV 3.0 V8	**F**	(United Kingdom) John Watson	12	Ret	Ret	11	11	6	11	7	16	11					
1974	Brabham BT42	Ford Cosworth DFV 3.0 V8	**F**	(Brazil) Carlos Pace									DNQ						
1974	Brabham BT44	Ford Cosworth DFV 3.0 V8	**F**	(United Kingdom) John Watson											Ret	4	7	Ret	5

=== Formula One Non-Championship results ===
Year	Entrant	Chassis	Engine	Driver	1	2	3	4	5	6
1972	Hexagon of Highgate	March 721	Ford Cosworth DFV V8		ROC	BRA	INT	OUL	REP	VIC
1972	Hexagon of Highgate	March 721	Ford Cosworth DFV V8	(United Kingdom) John Watson						6
1977	Hexagon of Highgate	Penske PC3	Ford Cosworth DFV V8		ROC					
1977	Hexagon of Highgate	Penske PC3	Ford Cosworth DFV V8	(United Kingdom) Bob Evans	11					

=== Complete Shellsport International Series results ===
(key) (Races in bold indicate pole position; races in italics indicate fastest lap)

Year	Entrant	Chassis	Engine(s)	Drivers	1	2	3	4	5	6	7	8	9	10	11	12	13	14
1976	Hexagon Racing	March 75A	Ford GAA 3.4 V6		MAL	SNE	OUL	BRH	THR	BRH	MAL	SNE	BRH	THR	OUL	BRH	BRH	
1976	Hexagon Racing	March 75A	Ford GAA 3.4 V6	(United Kingdom) Damien Magee	2	1	**1**	3	NC	2	Ret	Ret						
1976	Hexagon Racing	Penske PC3	Ford Cosworth DFV 3.0 V8	(United Kingdom) Damien Magee									4	2	Ret			
1976	Hexagon Racing	Penske PC3	Ford Cosworth DFV 3.0 V8	(United Kingdom) Derek Bell												4	2	
1977	Hexagon Racing	Penske PC3	Ford Cosworth DFV 3.0 V8		MAL	SNE	OUL	BRH	MAL	THR	BRH	OUL	MAL	DON	BRH	THR	SNE	BRH
1977	Hexagon Racing	Penske PC3	Ford Cosworth DFV 3.0 V8	(United Kingdom) Nick May		DNS												
1977	Hexagon Racing	Penske PC3	Ford Cosworth DFV 3.0 V8	(United Kingdom) Derek Bell			1	4		Ret			DSQ	4	DNS			
1977	Hexagon Racing	Penske PC3	Ford Cosworth DFV 3.0 V8	(United Kingdom) Brian Henton														3
