= Penske PC3 =

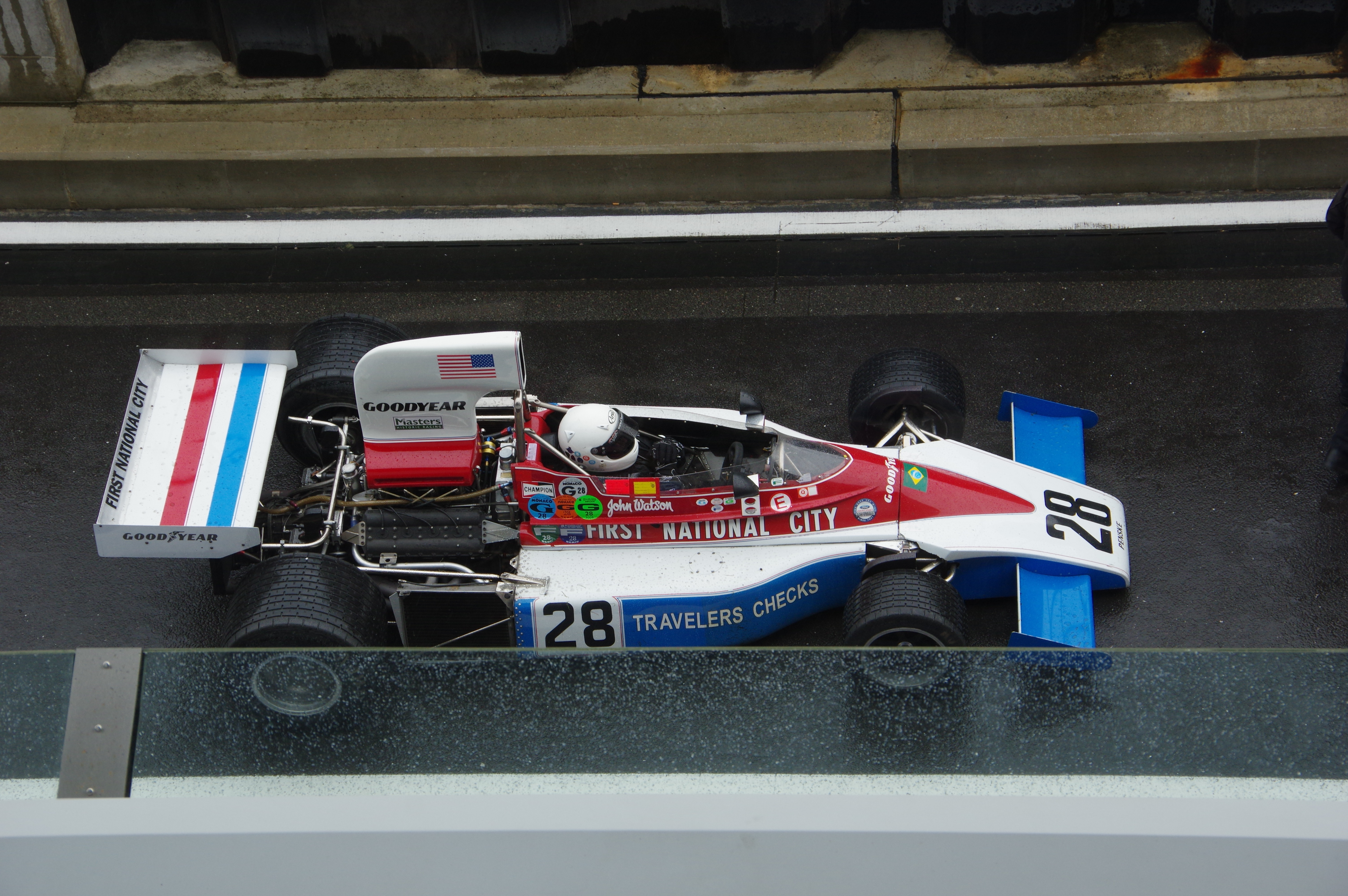
- Penske PC3 in 2015 Silverstone Classic.
- Category: Formula One
- Constructor: Penske
- Designer: Geoff Ferris
- Predecessor: PC1
- Successor: PC4

Technical specifications
- Chassis: Aluminium monocoque
- Axle track: Front: 1,499 mm (59.0 in); Rear: 1,562 mm (61.5 in)
- Wheelbase: 2,692 mm (106.0 in)
- Engine: Ford Cosworth DFV 2,993 cc (182.6 cu in) V8 naturally aspirated Mid-engine, longitudinally mounted
- Transmission: Hewland FG 400 5-speed manual
- Weight: 582 kg (1,283 lb)
- Fuel: Sunoco
- Tyres: Goodyear

Competition history
- Notable entrants: Citibank Team Penske; F&S Properties
- Notable drivers: (United Kingdom) John Watson (Netherlands) Boy Hayje
- Debut: 1976 Brazilian Grand Prix
Races	Wins	Poles	F/Laps
7	0	0	0
- Constructors' Championships: 0
- Drivers' Championships: 0

The Penske PC3 was a Formula One car used by Citibank Team Penske during the 1976 Formula One season, It was designed by Geoff Ferris.

== Development ==
In 1976 Penske signed a sponsorship deal with Citibank and built a new car, the Penske PC3. Northern Irish driver John Watson was signed to drive the car. which retained some of the design features from its predecessors, the Penske PC1, and the March 751. The PC3 was a development of the March 751 and bore a close resemblance to it. In total, two cars were constructed with one being driven by Watson.

== Racing history ==
=== Citibank Team Penske ===
==== 1975 ====
Penske fielded the brand new PC3 for Watson in the final race of the 1975 season. The United States Grand Prix, Watson used the car in practice, but due to a technical failure was forced to switch to the old PC1, which was in the paddock as a demonstrator, for the race. He finished in ninth position, but his performance earned him a full-time Penske F1 drive for 1976.

==== 1976 ====
The first race of the 1976 season was the Brazilian Grand Prix, Watson retired when a fuel system failure turned into a fire. and finished fifth at South Africa. Watson was eleven laps down and not classified at the United States Grand Prix West and retired at Spain with engine failure, Watson finished seventh at the Belgian Grand Prix and tenth at Monaco. The PC3 was not as good as had been hoped and in the midseason Penske produced a new Penske PC4 from the Swedish Grand Prix onwards.

The Penske team scored 20 World Championship points in 1976, two with the PC3 and 18 with the PC4. Earning them fifth place in the Constructors' Championship.

=== F&S Properties ===
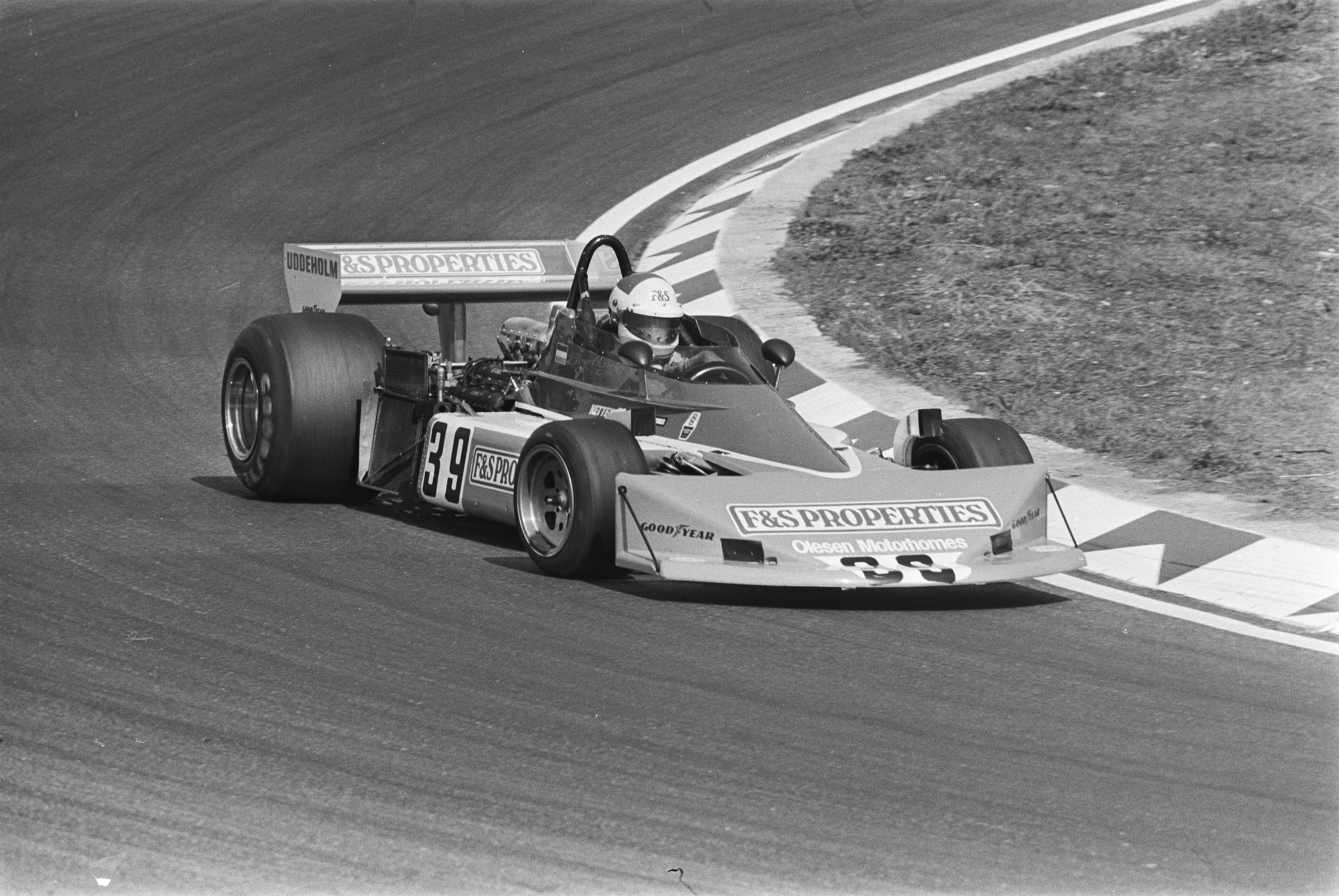
Boy Hayje driving a PC3 entered by F&S Properties for the 1976 Dutch Grand Prix.

F&S Properties bought a PC3 from Penske and entered Dutchman Boy Hayje for his home race, the 1976 Dutch Grand Prix but he retired with a broken halfshaft.

=== Later ues ===
The PC3 was later used in the 2008 Historic Grand Prix of Monaco, winning the race with Paul Edwards.

== Complete Formula One World Championship results ==
(key)

Year	Entrants	Engine	Tyres	Drivers	1	2	3	4	5	6	7	8	9	10	11	12	13	14	15	16	17	Points	WCC
1975	Penske Cars	Ford Cosworth DFV 3.0 V8	G		ARG	BRA	RSA	ESP	MON	BEL	SWE	NED	FRA	GBR	GER	AUT	ITA	USA				2^{1}	12th^{1}
1975	Penske Cars	Ford Cosworth DFV 3.0 V8	G	John Watson														PO				2^{1}	12th^{1}
1976	Citibank Team Penske	Ford Cosworth DFV 3.0 V8	G		BRA	RSA	USW	ESP	BEL	MON	SWE	FRA	GBR	GER	AUT	NED	ITA	CAN	USE	JPN		20^{2}	5th^{2}
1976	Citibank Team Penske	Ford Cosworth DFV 3.0 V8	G	John Watson	Ret	5	NC	Ret	7	10												20^{2}	5th^{2}
1976	F&S Properties	Ford Cosworth DFV 3.0 V8	G	Boy Hayje												Ret						20^{2}	5th^{2}
1977	Hexagon Racing	Ford Cosworth DFV 3.0 V8	G		ARG	BRA	RSA	USW	ESP	MON	BEL	SWE	FRA	GBR	GER	AUT	NED	ITA	USE	CAN	JPN	1^{3}	12th^{3}
1977	Hexagon Racing	Ford Cosworth DFV 3.0 V8	G	Derek Bell										WD								1^{3}	12th^{3}

^1 All points scored in 1975 with the Penske PC1.
^2 18 points scored in 1976 with the Penske PC4.
^3 1 point scored in 1977 with the Penske PC4.

== Non-Championship results ==
(key)

Year	Entrants	Engine	Tyres	Drivers	1	2
1976	Citibank Team Penske	Ford Cosworth DFV 3.0 V8	G		ROC	INT
1976	Citibank Team Penske	Ford Cosworth DFV 3.0 V8	G	John Watson	Ret	
1977	Hexagon Racing	Ford Cosworth DFV 3.0 V8	G		ROC	
1977	Hexagon Racing	Ford Cosworth DFV 3.0 V8	G	Bob Evans	11	
