= John Watson (racing driver) =

British racing driver (born 1946)

John Watson MBE
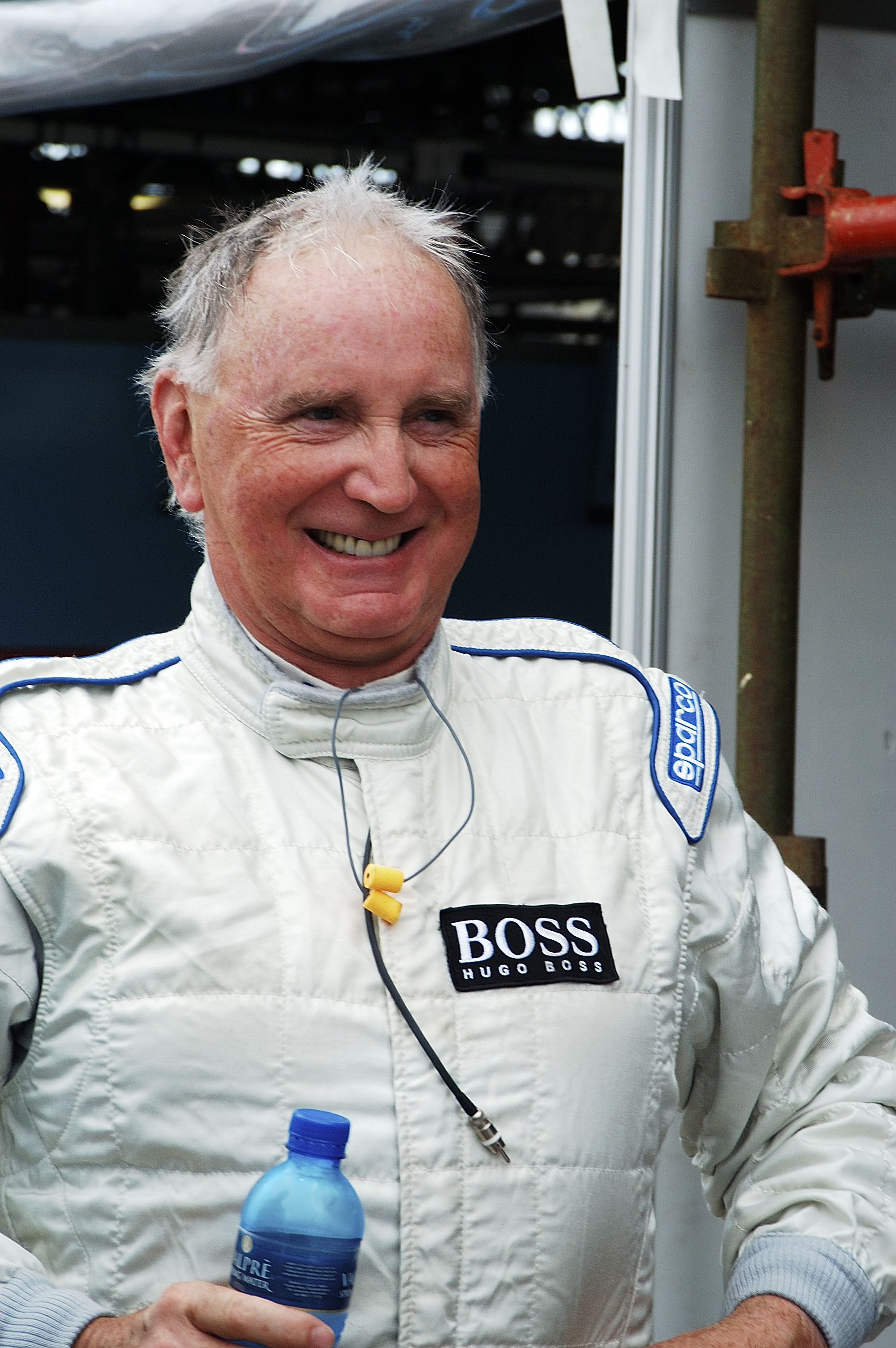
- Watson in 2008
- Born: John Marshall Watson; 4 May 1946 (age 80); Belfast, Northern Ireland

Formula One World Championship career
- Nationality: (United Kingdom) British
- Active years: 1973–1983, 1985
- Team(s): Hexagon, Brabham, Surtees, Lotus, Penske, McLaren
- Entries: 154 (152 starts)
- Championships: 0
- Wins: 5
- Podiums: 20
- Career points: 169
- Pole positions: 2
- Fastest laps: 5
- First entry: 1973 British Grand Prix
- First win: 1976 Austrian Grand Prix
- Last win: 1983 United States Grand Prix West
- Last entry: 1985 European Grand Prix

24 Hours of Le Mans career
- Years: 1973, 1984–1985, 1987–1990
- Teams: Gulf, Jaguar, Porsche, Toyota, RLR
- Best finish: 11th (1990)
- Class wins: 0

Awards
- 1982 1978, 1982, 1983: Autosport British Competition Driver of the Year; Hawthorn Memorial Trophy

John Marshall Watson (born 4 May 1946) is a British former racing driver and broadcaster from Northern Ireland, who competed in Formula One from 1973 to 1985. Watson won five Formula One Grands Prix across 12 seasons.

Watson competed in Formula One for Brabham, Surtees, Lotus, Penske and McLaren. He finished third in the 1982 World Drivers' Championship with McLaren. Watson also competed in the World Sportscar Championship, finishing runner-up in 1987 with Jaguar.

Upon his retirement from motor racing, Watson became a commentator for Eurosport from 1989 until 1996. Between 2010 and 2024, he served as co-commentator for GT World Challenge Europe, and also commentated on the 2022 Miami Grand Prix for F1TV.

== Early Formula One career ==
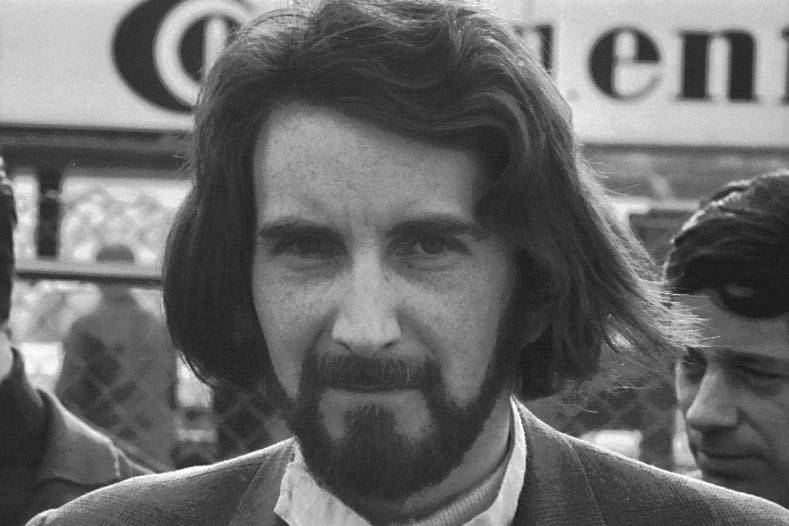
Watson at a Formula Two race at Hockenheim in 1971

Watson was born in Belfast and educated at Rockport School, Northern Ireland. Watson's Formula One career began in 1972, driving a customer March-Cosworth 721 for Goldie Hexagon Racing in a non-Championship event: the World Championship Victory Race at Brands Hatch. Watson's first World Championship events came in the 1973 season, in which he raced in the British Grand Prix in a customer Brabham-Ford BT37, and the US Grand Prix, where he drove the third works Brabham BT42. Neither was particularly successful, as in the British race he ran out of fuel on the 36th lap and his engine failed after only seven laps in the United States event.

Watson scored his first World Championship point in the 1974 Monaco Grand Prix, while driving for Goldie Hexagon Racing. He went on to score a total of six points that season, driving a customer Brabham BT42-Ford modified by the team. He failed to score Championship points the following year, driving for Team Surtees, Team Lotus and Penske Cars. At the 1975 Spanish Grand Prix he had the chance to score his first win. He was in second position, behind Mario Andretti, until he had to stop in the pits for checks after his car started to suffer vibrations. Andretti retired later, and after rejoining the race Watson finished in eighth, his best Championship result in 1975. In non-Championship races he fared somewhat better, taking second place in the Race of Champions at Brands Hatch, and fourth at the International Trophy race at Silverstone.

== Rise to prominence ==
Watson secured his first World Championship podium with third place at the 1976 French Grand Prix. Later that season came his first victory, driving for Penske in the Austrian Grand Prix, having qualified second on the grid. After the race he shaved off his beard, the result of a bet with team owner Roger Penske. In a June 2023 interview with F1Weekly podcast Watson said the team flew to London Sunday evening after the race, and Penske did not recognize him in the hotel lobby Monday morning.

In the third race of the 1977 Formula One season, the South African Grand Prix, Watson managed to complete the race distance, scored a point, and took his first ever fastest lap. His achievements were overshadowed, however, by the deaths of driver Tom Pryce and a track marshal, Frederik Jansen van Vuuren. His Brabham-Alfa Romeo let him down throughout the season but, despite this, he gained his first pole position in the Monaco Grand Prix and qualified in the top ten no fewer than 14 times, often in the first two rows. Problems with the car, accidents, and a disqualification meant that he raced the full distance in only five of the 17 races. The closest he came to victory was during the French Grand Prix, where he dominated the race from the start only to be let down by a fuel metering problem on the last lap which relegated him to second place behind eventual winner Mario Andretti.

In 1978, Watson managed a more successful season in terms of race finishes, even out-qualifying and out-racing his teammate Niki Lauda on occasion. He managed three podiums and a pole, and notched up 25 points to earn the highest championship placing of his career to that point.

== Move to McLaren and championship challenge ==
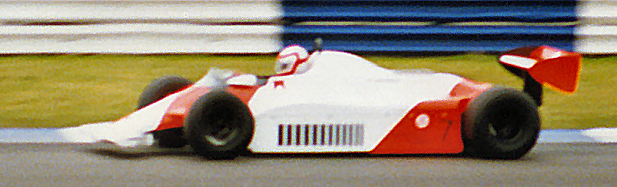
Watson driving the McLaren MP4/1.

For 1979, Watson moved to McLaren where he gave them their first victory in over three years by winning the 1981 British Grand Prix and also securing the first victory for a carbon fibre composite monocoque F1 car, the McLaren MP4/1. Later in the 1981 season, the strength of the McLaren's carbon fibre monocoque (designed by John Barnard) was demonstrated when he had a fiery crash at Monza during the Italian Grand Prix. Watson lost the car coming out of the high speed Lesmo bends and crashed backwards into the barriers. Similar accidents had previously proven fatal, but Watson was uninjured in an accident he later recalled as looking far worse than it actually was. After James Hunt's abrupt retirement after the Monaco Grand Prix in 1979, Watson was the only full-time competitive British F1 driver up until the end of his career.

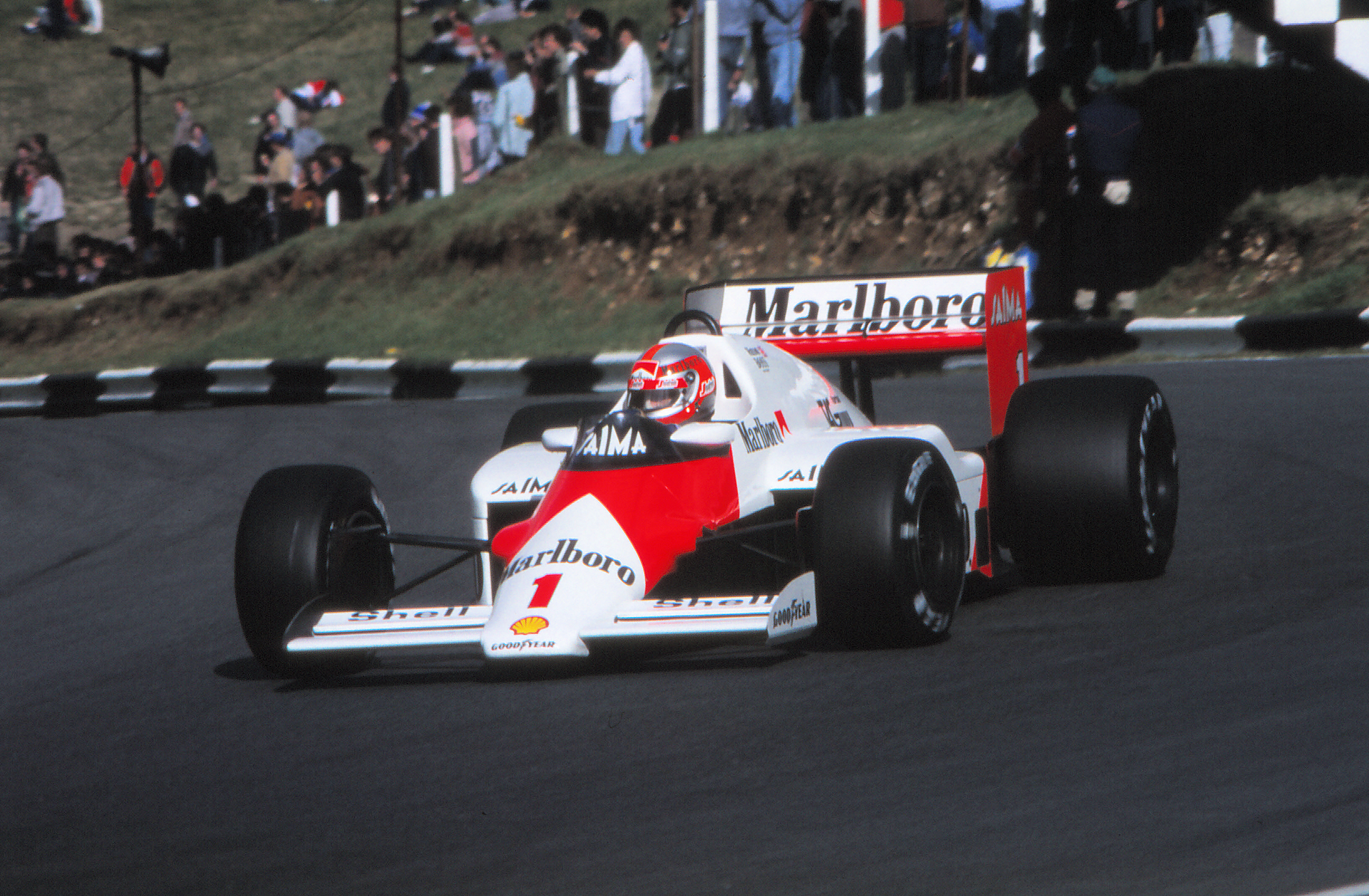
Watson during practice for the 1985 European Grand Prix, his last F1 race.

Watson's most successful year was 1982, when he finished third in the Drivers' Championship, winning two Grands Prix. In several races he achieved high placings despite qualifying towards the back of the grid. At the first ever Detroit Grand Prix in 1982, he overtook three cars in one lap deep into the race on a tight, twisty track that was difficult to pass on; working his way from 17th starting position on the grid, he charged through the field and scored a victory in the process. Watson went into the final race of the season at Caesars Palace in with an outside chance of the title, but he was to finish five points adrift of Keke Rosberg and level on points with Didier Pironi.

A year later in 1983, Watson repeated the feat of winning from the back of the grid at the final Formula One race in Long Beach; another street circuit, starting from 22nd on the grid, the farthest back from which a modern Grand Prix driver had ever come to win a race. Watson's final victory also included a fight for position with teammate Niki Lauda, who had started the race 23rd, though Watson ultimately finished 27 seconds ahead of his dual World Championship winning teammate.

At the end of the 1983 season however, Watson was dropped by McLaren and subsequently retired from Formula One. Negotiations with team boss Ron Dennis reportedly broke down when Watson asked for more money than dual World Champion Lauda was earning, citing having won a GP in 1983 where Lauda did not. Dennis instead signed Renault refugee Alain Prost for comparatively little (since he was already under contract to Renault but was fired for 1984). He did return for one further race two years later, driving for McLaren in place of an injured Lauda at the 1985 European Grand Prix at Brands Hatch, in which he qualified 21st and placed seventh in the race (Lauda had injured his wrist in qualifying for the previous race at Spa, forcing him to miss that race also). Watson raced with Lauda's race number of "1" (the Austrian having won the 1984 World Championship). This was only the second occasion since 1974 when the system of permanent racing numbers thoroughout the entire season was first instituted that a driver other than the reigning World Champion has raced car number 1 in a World Championship race, the only other driver being Ronnie Peterson in the 1974 season, as reigning World Champion Jackie Stewart had retired upon the conclusion of the 1973 season.

== Sportscar career ==
In 1984, Watson turned to sports car racing, notably partnering Stefan Bellof to victory at the Fuji 1000 km during Bellof's 1984 Championship year. He was also part of the driver lineup for Bob Tullius' Group 44 Jaguar team at the 1984 24 Hours of Le Mans driving an IMSA spec Jaguar XJR-5 powered by a 6.0 litre V12 in the IMSA / GTP class. In what was Jaguar's first appearance at Le Mans since 1959, Watson briefly took the lead of the race towards the end of the first hour when the faster Porsche 956s and Lancia LC2s pitted. Driving with American Tony Adamowicz and Frenchman Claude Ballot-Léna, they failed to finish the race due to engine trouble though they were classified in 28th place.

Watson also finished second in the 1987 season alongside Jan Lammers in the TWR Silk Cut Jaguar XJR-8 when they won a total of three championship races (Jarama, Monza and Fuji). Watson competed in the 24 Hours of Le Mans seven times over the course of his career between 1973 and 1990, finishing 11th, a career best, in his last start in 1990 driving a Porsche 962C for Richard Lloyd Racing alongside fellow Grand Prix drivers Bruno Giacomelli and Allen Berg.

== Other work ==
After retiring from active racing, Watson worked as a television commentator, ran a race school at Silverstone and managed a racetrack. He also became the first man to ever test a Jordan Formula One car in 1990.

From 1989 to 1996, Watson worked as a Formula One commentator for Eurosport alongside Andrew Marriott (1989-1990), Richard Nicholls (1990–1992), Allard Kalff (1992–1994) and Ben Edwards (1995–1996). The last Grand Prix Eurosport broadcast live in the UK was the Japanese GP in 1996. The contracts for Formula One live broadcasts were shifted to private TV stations for 1997. In 1997 Watson worked as a Formula One commentator for ESPN.

From 1998 to 2001, Watson was Charlie Cox's sidekick in commentating on the British Touring Car Championship for the BBC.

During the 2002 F1 season, Watson co-commentated on Sky Sports' Pay Per View F1+ coverage alongside Ben Edwards. However, this was fairly unpopular and it was axed for the 2003 season.

In 2005–2009, Watson worked as an expert commentator for BSkyb during their broadcasts of the A1 Grand Prix series.

In 2010, Watson commentated on some rounds of the FIA GT1 and GT3 Championships. He went on to provide expert commentary on the Blancpain GT Series (later GT World Challenge Europe) alongside David Addison until 2024.

== Legacy ==
In 2016, in an academic paper that reported a mathematical modelling study that assessed the relative influence of driver and machine, Watson was ranked the 25th best Formula One driver of all time.

== Racing record ==
=== Career summary ===
Season	Series	Team	Races	Wins	Poles	F/Laps	Podiums	Points	Position
1969	European Formula Two	Team Ireland	1	0	0	0	0	0	NC
1970	European Formula Two	John Watson	2	0	0	0	0	0	NC
1971	European Formula Two	John Watson	6	0	0	0	0	5	15th
1972	European Formula Two	Allan McCall Team Tui	6	0	0	0	0	4	23rd
1972	British Formula Two	Allan McCall Team Tui	1	0	0	0	0	0	NC
1972	British Formula Two	Chevron Racing Team	1	0	0	0	0	0	NC
1972	World Sportscar Championship	William Tuckett	1	0	0	0	0	0	NC
1973	World Sportscar Championship	Gulf Research Racing	4	0	0	0	0	18	NC
1973	European Formula 5000	Hexagon Racing	2	0	1	0	1	24	6th
1973	European Formula Two	Chevron Racing Team	2	0	1	0	1	4	20th
1973	European Formula Two	Motor Racing Developments	1	0	0	0	0	4	20th
1973	Formula One	Motor Racing Developments	1	0	0	0	0	0	NC
1973	Formula One	Hexagon of Highgate	1	0	0	0	0	0	NC
1974	Formula One	Goldie Hexagon Racing	15	0	0	0	0	6	15th
1974	European Formula Two	Bang & Olufsen Team Surtees	5	0	0	0	1	6	11th
1974	World Sportscar Championship	Chevron Cars	1	0	0	0	0	0	NC
1975	Formula One	Matchbox Team Surtees	11	0	0	0	0	0	NC
1975	Formula One	John Player Team Lotus	1	0	0	0	0	0	NC
1975	Formula One	First National City Bank Team	1	0	0	0	0	0	NC
1975	World Sportscar Championship	GELO Racing Team Mirage	1	0	0	0	0	0	NC
1976	Formula One	First National City Bank Team Penske	16	1	0	0	3	20	7th
1977	Formula One	Martini Racing	17	0	1	2	1	9	13th
1977	World Sportscar Championship	Autodelta SpA	1	0	1	0	0	0	NC
1978	Formula One	Parmalat Racing Team	16	0	1	0	3	25	6th
1979	Formula One	Marlboro Team McLaren	15	0	0	0	1	15	9th
1980	Formula One	Marlboro Team McLaren	13	0	0	0	0	6	10th
1980	BMW M1 Procar Championship	GS Team	1	0	0	0	0	3	23rd
1981	Formula One	Marlboro McLaren International	15	1	0	1	4	27	6th
1982	Formula One	Marlboro McLaren International	15	2	0	1	5	39	**3rd**
1983	Formula One	Marlboro McLaren International Team	14	1	0	1	3	22	6th
1984	World Sportscar Championship	Rothmans Porsche	3	1	1	0	1	26	23rd
1984	World Sportscar Championship	Jaguar Group 44	1	0	0	0	0	26	23rd
1985	Formula One	Marlboro McLaren TAG Turbo	1	0	0	0	0	0	NC
1985	24 Hours of Le Mans	Rothmans Porsche	1	0	0	0	0	0	DNF
1987	24 Hours of Le Mans	Silk Cut Jaguar	1	0	0	0	0	0	DNF
1988	24 Hours of Le Mans	Silk Cut Jaguar	1	0	0	0	0	0	DNF
1989	24 Hours of Le Mans	Toyota Team Tom's	1	0	0	0	0	0	DNF
1990	24 Hours of Le Mans	Richard Lloyd Racing	1	0	0	0	0	0	11th

=== Complete European Formula Two Championship results ===
(key) (Races in bold indicate pole position; races in italics indicate fastest lap)

Year	Entrant	Chassis	Engine	1	2	3	4	5	6	7	8	9	10	11	12	13	14	15	16	17	Pos.	Pts
1969	Team Ireland	Lotus 48	Cosworth FVA	THR; Ret	HOC	NÜR	JAR	TUL	PER	VLL											NC	0
1970	John Watson	Brabham BT30	Cosworth FVA	THR; Ret	HOC; DNQ	BAR; Ret	ROU; DNS	PER	TUL	IMO	HOC										NC	0
1971	John Watson	Brabham BT30	Cosworth FVA	HOC; Ret	THR; DNS	NÜR; 12	JAR; 11	PAL; DNQ	ROU; DNQ	MAN; 5	TUL; 5	ALB	VLL; 6	VLL							15th	5
1972	Allan McCall Team Tui	Leda-Tui AM29	Ford BDA	MAL	THR	HOC	PAU	PAL; Ret	HOC; 10												23rd	4
1972	Allan McCall Team Tui	Leda-Tui BH2	Ford BDA							ROU; 5	ÖST; 8	IMO; 8	MAN; Ret	PER	SAL	ALB	HOC				23rd	4
1973	Motor Racing Developments	Brabham BT40	Ford BDA	MAL; Ret	HOC	THR	NÜR	PAU	KIN	NIV	HOC	ROU	MNZ								20th	4
1973	Chevron Racing Team	Chevron B25	Ford BDA											**MAN**; 3	KAR	PER	SAL	NOR	ALB; 10	VLL	20th	4
1974	Bang & Olufsen Team Surtees	Surtees TS15	Ford BDA	BAR	HOC; 2																11th	6
1974	Bang & Olufsen Team Surtees	Surtees TS15A	BMW M12			PAU; Ret	SAL; 10	HOC	MUG; Ret	KAR	PER; Ret	HOC	VLL								11th	6

=== Complete Formula One World Championship results ===
(key) (Races in bold indicate pole position; races in italics indicate fastest lap)

Year	Entrant	Chassis	Engine	1	2	3	4	5	6	7	8	9	10	11	12	13	14	15	16	17	WDC	Pts
1973	Hexagon of Highgate	Brabham BT37	Ford Cosworth DFV 3.0 V8	ARG	BRA	RSA	ESP	BEL	MON	SWE	FRA	GBR; Ret	NED	GER	AUT	ITA	CAN				NC	0
1973	Ceramica Pagnossin Team MRD	Brabham BT42	Ford Cosworth DFV 3.0 V8															USA; Ret			NC	0
1974	Goldie Hexagon Racing	Brabham BT42	Ford Cosworth DFV 3.0 V8	ARG; 12	BRA; Ret	RSA; Ret	ESP; 11	BEL; 11	MON; 6	SWE; 11	NED; 7	FRA; 16	GBR; 11								15th	6
1974	Goldie Hexagon Racing	Brabham BT44	Ford Cosworth DFV 3.0 V8											GER; Ret	AUT; 4	ITA; 7	CAN; Ret	USA; 5			15th	6
1975	Matchbox Team Surtees	Surtees TS16	Ford Cosworth DFV 3.0 V8	ARG; DSQ	BRA; 10	RSA; Ret	ESP; 8	MON; Ret	BEL; 10	SWE; 16	NED; Ret	FRA; 13	GBR; 11		AUT; 10	ITA					NC	0
1975	John Player Team Lotus	Lotus 72F	Ford Cosworth DFV 3.0 V8											GER; Ret							NC	0
1975	First National City Bank Team	Penske PC1	Ford Cosworth DFV 3.0 V8														USA; 9				NC	0
1976	First National City Bank Team Penske	Penske PC3	Ford Cosworth DFV 3.0 V8	BRA; Ret	RSA; 5	USW; NC	ESP; Ret	BEL; 7	MON; 10												7th	20
1976	First National City Bank Team Penske	Penske PC4	Ford Cosworth DFV 3.0 V8							SWE; Ret	FRA; 3	GBR; 3	GER; 7	AUT; 1	NED; Ret	ITA; 11	CAN; 10	USA; 6	JPN; Ret		7th	20
1977	Martini Racing	Brabham BT45B	Alfa Romeo 115-12 3.0 F12	ARG; Ret	BRA; Ret	RSA; 6	USW; DSQ	ESP; Ret	**MON**; Ret	BEL; Ret	SWE; 5	FRA; 2	GBR; Ret	GER; Ret	AUT; 8	NED; Ret	ITA; Ret	USA; 12	CAN; Ret	JPN; Ret	13th	9
1978	Parmalat Racing	Brabham BT45C	Alfa Romeo 115-12 3.0 F12	ARG; Ret	BRA; 8																6th	25
1978	Parmalat Racing	Brabham BT46	Alfa Romeo 115-12 3.0 F12			RSA; 3	USW; Ret	MON; 4	BEL; Ret	ESP; 5		**FRA**; 4	GBR; 3	GER; 7	AUT; 7	NED; 4	ITA; 2	USA; Ret	CAN; Ret		6th	25
1978	Parmalat Racing	Brabham BT46B	Alfa Romeo 115-12 3.0 F12								SWE; Ret										6th	25
1979	Löwenbräu Team McLaren	McLaren M28	Ford Cosworth DFV 3.0 V8				USW; Ret															
1979	Marlboro Team McLaren	McLaren M28	Ford Cosworth DFV 3.0 V8	ARG; 3	BRA; 8	RSA; Ret															9th	15
1979	Marlboro Team McLaren	McLaren M28B	Ford Cosworth DFV 3.0 V8					ESP; Ret	BEL; 6												9th	15
1979	Marlboro Team McLaren	McLaren M28C	Ford Cosworth DFV 3.0 V8							MON; 4	FRA; 11										9th	15
1979	Marlboro Team McLaren	McLaren M29	Ford Cosworth DFV 3.0 V8									GBR; 4	GER; 5	AUT; 9	NED; Ret	ITA; Ret	CAN; 6	USA; 6			9th	15
1980	Marlboro Team McLaren	McLaren M29B	Ford Cosworth DFV 3.0 V8	ARG; Ret	BRA; 11	RSA; 11															11th	6
1980	Marlboro Team McLaren	McLaren M29C	Ford Cosworth DFV 3.0 V8				USW; 4	BEL; NC	MON; DNQ	FRA; 7	GBR; 8	GER; Ret	AUT; Ret	NED; Ret	ITA; Ret	CAN; 4	USA; NC				11th	6
1981	Marlboro McLaren International	McLaren M29F	Ford Cosworth DFV 3.0 V8	USW; Ret	BRA; 8																6th	27
1981	Marlboro McLaren International	McLaren MP4	Ford Cosworth DFV 3.0 V8			ARG; Ret	SMR; 10	BEL; 7	MON; Ret	ESP; 3	FRA; 2	GBR; 1	GER; 6	AUT; 6	NED; Ret	ITA; Ret	CAN; 2	CPL; 7			6th	27
1982	Marlboro McLaren International	McLaren MP4B	Ford Cosworth DFV 3.0 V8	RSA; 6	BRA; 2	USW; 6	SMR	BEL; 1	MON; Ret	DET; 1	CAN; 3	NED; 9	GBR; Ret	FRA; Ret	GER; Ret	AUT; Ret	SUI; 13	ITA; 4	CPL; 2		**3rd**	**39**
1983	Marlboro McLaren International Team	McLaren MP4/1C	Ford Cosworth DFV 3.0 V8	BRA; Ret	USW; 1	FRA; Ret															6th	22
1983	Marlboro McLaren International Team	McLaren MP4/1C	Ford Cosworth DFY 3.0 V8				SMR; 5	MON; DNQ	BEL; Ret	DET; 3	CAN; 6	GBR; 9	GER; 5	AUT; 9	NED; 3						6th	22
1983	Marlboro McLaren International Team	McLaren MP4/1E	TAG TTE PO1 1.5 V6t													ITA; Ret	EUR; Ret	RSA; DSQ			6th	22
1985	Marlboro McLaren TAG Turbo	McLaren MP4/2B	TAG TTE PO1 1.5 V6t	BRA	POR	SMR	MON	CAN	DET	FRA	GBR	GER	AUT	NED	ITA	BEL	EUR; 7	RSA	AUS		NC	0

=== Complete Formula One non-championship results ===
(key) (races in italics indicate fastest lap)

Year	Entrant	Chassis	Engine	1	2	3	4	5	6
1972	Goldie Hexagon Racing	March 721	Ford Cosworth DFV 3.0 V8	ROC	BRA	INT	OUL	REP	VIC; 6
1973	Motor Racing Developments	Brabham BT42	Ford Cosworth DFV 3.0 V8	ROC; Ret	INT				
1975	Matchbox Team Surtees	Surtees TS16	Ford Cosworth DFV 3.0 V8	ROC; 2	INT; 4	SUI; 5			
1976	First National City Bank Team Penske	Penske PC3	Ford Cosworth DFV 3.0 V8	ROC; Ret	INT				
1977	Martini Racing	Brabham BT45	Alfa Romeo 115-12 3.0 F12	**ROC**; 3					
1979	Marlboro Team McLaren	McLaren M28	Ford Cosworth DFV 3.0 V8	ROC; Ret	GNM	DIN			
1980	Marlboro Team McLaren	McLaren M29C	Ford Cosworth DFV 3.0 V8	ESP; Ret					
1981	Marlboro McLaren International	McLaren M29F	Ford Cosworth DFV 3.0 V8	RSA; 5					
1983	Marlboro McLaren International Team	McLaren MP4/1C	Ford Cosworth DFV 3.0 V8	ROC; Ret					

=== Complete 24 Hours of Le Mans results ===
Year	Team	Co-Drivers	Car	Class	Laps	Pos.	Class Pos.
1973	(United Kingdom) Gulf Research Racing	(United Kingdom) Mike Hailwood (Australia) Vern Schuppan	Mirage M6 Ford	S 3.0	112	DNF	DNF
1984	(United States) Jaguar Group 44	(United States) Tony Adamowicz (France) Claude Ballot-Léna	Jaguar XJR-5	IMSA / GTP	212	DNF	DNF
1985	(West Germany) Rothmans Porsche	(United States) Al Holbert (Australia) Vern Schuppan	Porsche 962C	C1	299	DNF	DNF
1987	(United Kingdom) Silk Cut Jaguar (United Kingdom) Tom Walkinshaw Racing	(Netherlands) Jan Lammers (United Kingdom) Win Percy	Jaguar XJR-8LM	C1	158	DNF	DNF
1988	(United Kingdom) Silk Cut Jaguar (United Kingdom) Tom Walkinshaw Racing	(Brazil) Raul Boesel (France) Henri Pescarolo	Jaguar XJR-9LM	C1	129	DNF	DNF
1989	(Japan) Toyota Team Tom's	(United Kingdom) Geoff Lees (United Kingdom) Johnny Dumfries	Toyota 89C-V	C1	58	DNF	DNF
1990	(United Kingdom) Richard Lloyd Racing	(Italy) Bruno Giacomelli (Canada) Allen Berg	Porsche 962C	C1	335	11th	11th

== Notes ==
Awards
Preceded by James Hunt	Hawthorn Memorial Trophy; 1978	Succeeded by Alan Jones
Preceded by Inaugural	Autosport; British Competition Driver of the Year; 1982	Succeeded by Jonathan Palmer
Preceded by Alan Jones	Hawthorn Memorial Trophy; 1982–1983	Succeeded by Derek Warwick
