= 1974 Formula One season =

28th season of FIA Formula One motor racing

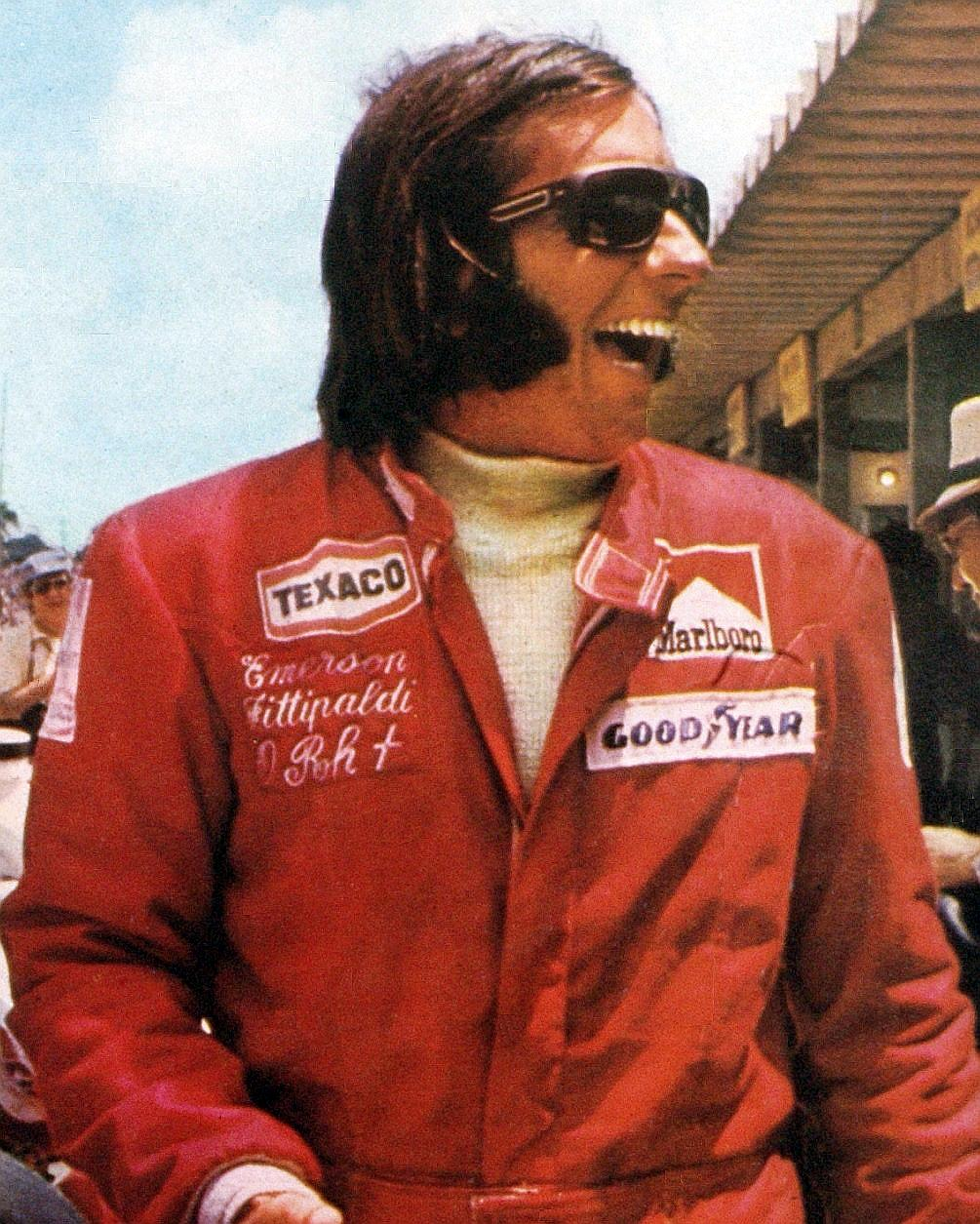
Emerson Fittipaldi won his second and final Drivers' Championship driving for McLaren-Ford.

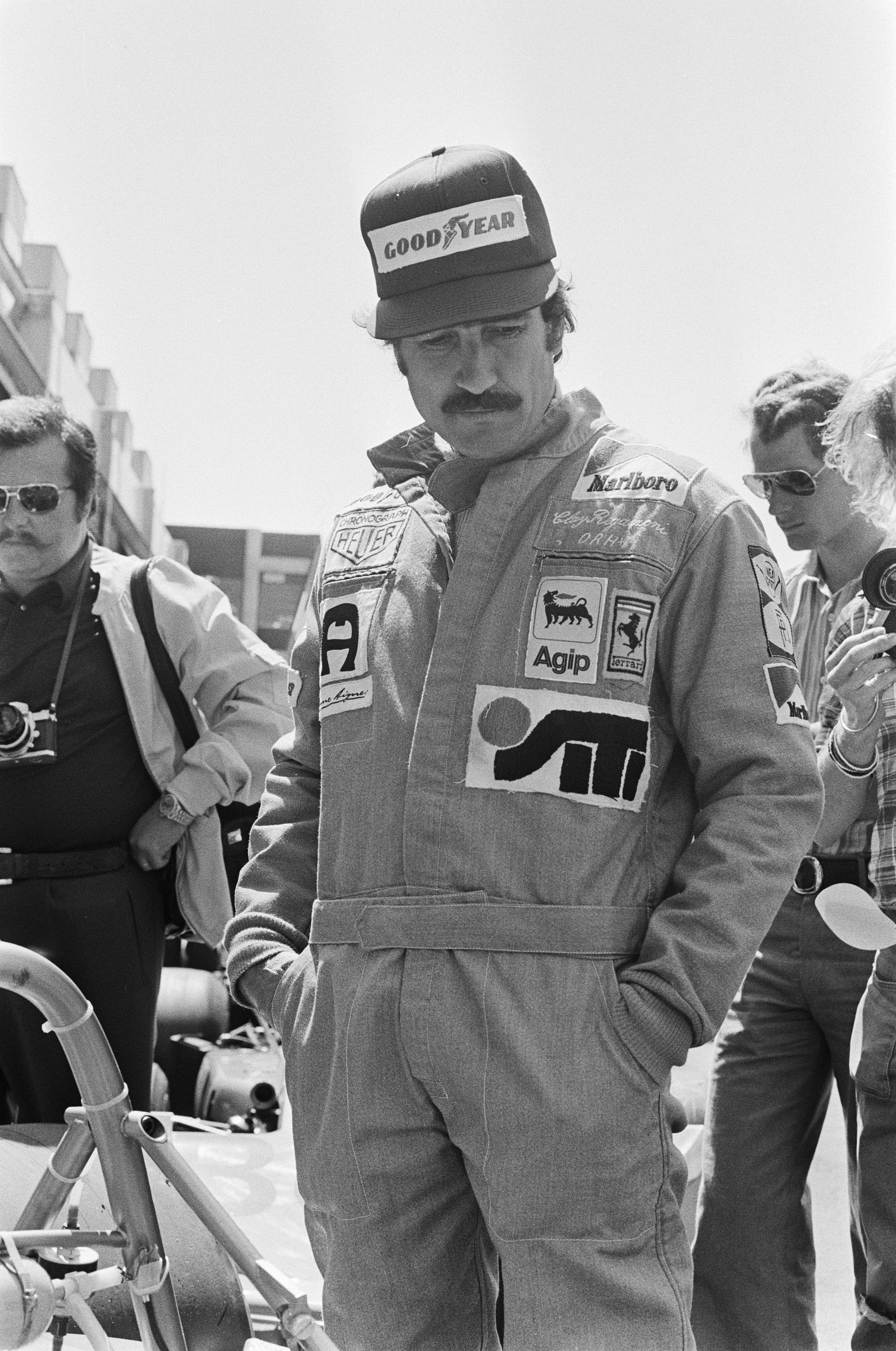
Clay Regazzoni, driving for Ferrari, finished the season in second, three points behind Fittipaldi.

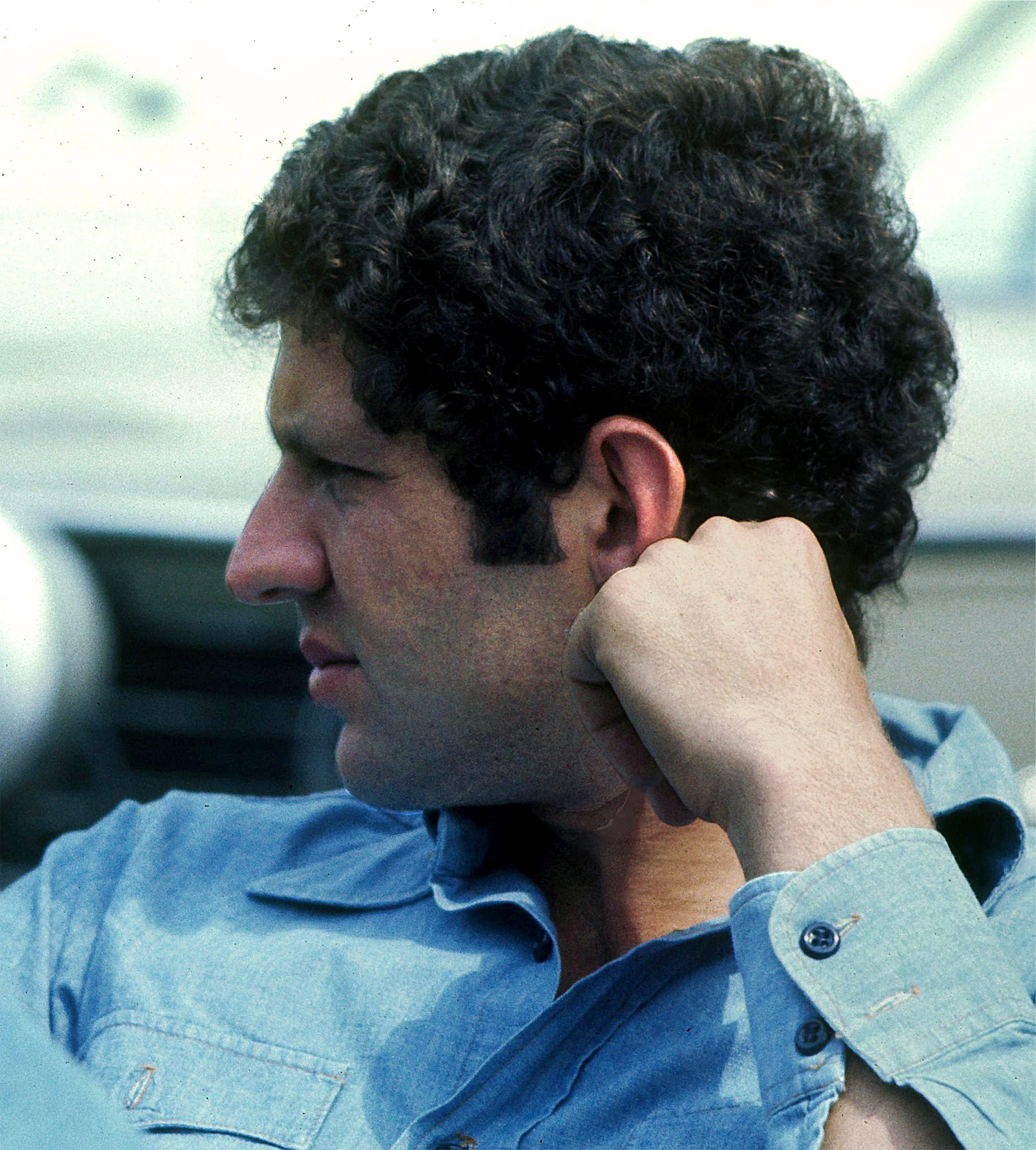
Jody Scheckter (pictured in 1976) finished third, driving for Tyrrell-Ford.

The 1974 Formula One season was the 28th season of FIA Formula One motor racing. It featured the 1974 World Championship of F1 Drivers and the 1974 International Cup for F1 Manufacturers, contested concurrently over a fifteen-race series which commenced on 13 January and ended on 6 October. The season also included three non-championship races.

Defending champion Jackie Stewart did not drive in 1974, having announced his retirement at the end of the previous season. For the first time since 1968, the battle for the Drivers' Championship went down to the very last race; Emerson Fittipaldi (McLaren) and Clay Regazzoni (Ferrari) began the race weekend at Watkins Glen with an equal number of points, but Regazzoni dropped down the field with handling problems and Fittipaldi's fourth place gave him his second championship. South African Jody Scheckter finished third for Tyrrell Racing after having an outside chance of also becoming champion. Fittipaldi's triumph with the British manufacturer wrought many firsts for Formula One and served as a precursor to what was to come; it was the first title for the McLaren team and the first of many titles for a team sponsored by the Marlboro cigarette brand.

Two F1 drivers died over the course of the season: Peter Revson during practice for the South African Grand Prix and Helmut Koinigg during the United States Grand Prix.

== Teams and drivers ==
The following teams and drivers contested the 1974 World Championship.

Entrant	Constructor	Chassis	Engine	Tyre	No	Driver	Rounds
(United Kingdom) John Player Team Lotus	Lotus-Ford	72E; 76	Ford Cosworth DFV 3.0 V8	G	1	(Sweden) Ronnie Peterson	All
(United Kingdom) John Player Team Lotus	Lotus-Ford	72E; 76	Ford Cosworth DFV 3.0 V8	G	2	(Belgium) Jacky Ickx	All
(United Kingdom) John Player Team Lotus	Lotus-Ford	72E; 76	Ford Cosworth DFV 3.0 V8	G	31	(Australia) Tim Schenken	15
(United Kingdom) Elf Team Tyrrell	Tyrrell-Ford	005; 006; 007	Ford Cosworth DFV 3.0 V8	G	3	(South Africa) Jody Scheckter	All
(United Kingdom) Elf Team Tyrrell	Tyrrell-Ford	005; 006; 007	Ford Cosworth DFV 3.0 V8	G	4	(France) Patrick Depailler	All
(United Kingdom) Marlboro Team Texaco (United Kingdom) Yardley Team McLaren	McLaren-Ford	M23B	Ford Cosworth DFV 3.0 V8	G	5	(Brazil) Emerson Fittipaldi	All
(United Kingdom) Marlboro Team Texaco (United Kingdom) Yardley Team McLaren	McLaren-Ford	M23B	Ford Cosworth DFV 3.0 V8	G	6	(New Zealand) Denny Hulme	1–3, 5–15
(United Kingdom) Marlboro Team Texaco (United Kingdom) Yardley Team McLaren	McLaren-Ford	M23B	Ford Cosworth DFV 3.0 V8	G	33	(United Kingdom) Mike Hailwood	1–11
(United Kingdom) Marlboro Team Texaco (United Kingdom) Yardley Team McLaren	McLaren-Ford	M23B	Ford Cosworth DFV 3.0 V8	G	33	(United Kingdom) David Hobbs	12–13
(United Kingdom) Marlboro Team Texaco (United Kingdom) Yardley Team McLaren	McLaren-Ford	M23B	Ford Cosworth DFV 3.0 V8	G	33	(West Germany) Jochen Mass	14–15
(United Kingdom) Marlboro Team Texaco (United Kingdom) Yardley Team McLaren	McLaren-Ford	M23B	Ford Cosworth DFV 3.0 V8	G	56	(New Zealand) Denny Hulme	4
(United Kingdom) Motor Racing Developments (United Kingdom) Hitachi Team Brabham	Brabham-Ford	BT42; BT44	Ford Cosworth DFV 3.0 V8	G	7	(Argentina) Carlos Reutemann	All
(United Kingdom) Motor Racing Developments (United Kingdom) Hitachi Team Brabham	Brabham-Ford	BT42; BT44	Ford Cosworth DFV 3.0 V8	G	8	(United Kingdom) Richard Robarts	1–3
(United Kingdom) Motor Racing Developments (United Kingdom) Hitachi Team Brabham	Brabham-Ford	BT42; BT44	Ford Cosworth DFV 3.0 V8	G	8	(Liechtenstein) Rikky von Opel	4–9
(United Kingdom) Motor Racing Developments (United Kingdom) Hitachi Team Brabham	Brabham-Ford	BT42; BT44	Ford Cosworth DFV 3.0 V8	G	8	(Brazil) Carlos Pace	10–15
(United Kingdom) Motor Racing Developments (United Kingdom) Hitachi Team Brabham	Brabham-Ford	BT42; BT44	Ford Cosworth DFV 3.0 V8	G	34	(Belgium) Teddy Pilette	5
(United Kingdom) March Engineering (United Kingdom) Beta Utensili	March-Ford	741	Ford Cosworth DFV 3.0 V8	G	9	(West Germany) Hans-Joachim Stuck	1–6, 8–15
(United Kingdom) March Engineering (United Kingdom) Beta Utensili	March-Ford	741	Ford Cosworth DFV 3.0 V8	G	9	(Sweden) Reine Wisell	7
(United Kingdom) March Engineering (United Kingdom) Beta Utensili	March-Ford	741	Ford Cosworth DFV 3.0 V8	G	10	(New Zealand) Howden Ganley	1–2
(United Kingdom) March Engineering (United Kingdom) Beta Utensili	March-Ford	741	Ford Cosworth DFV 3.0 V8	G	10	(Italy) Vittorio Brambilla	3–15
(Italy) SEFAC Ferrari	Ferrari	312B3-74	Ferrari 001/11 3.0 F12	G	11	(Switzerland) Clay Regazzoni	All
(Italy) SEFAC Ferrari	Ferrari	312B3-74	Ferrari 001/11 3.0 F12	G	12	(Austria) Niki Lauda	All
(United Kingdom) Team BRM	BRM	P160E; P201	BRM P142 3.0 V12; BRM P200 3.0 V12	F	14	(France) Jean-Pierre Beltoise	All
(United Kingdom) Team BRM	BRM	P160E; P201	BRM P142 3.0 V12; BRM P200 3.0 V12	F	15	(France) Henri Pescarolo	1–11, 13
(United Kingdom) Team BRM	BRM	P160E; P201	BRM P142 3.0 V12; BRM P200 3.0 V12	F	15	(New Zealand) Chris Amon	14–15
(United Kingdom) Team BRM	BRM	P160E; P201	BRM P142 3.0 V12; BRM P200 3.0 V12	F	37	(France) François Migault	1–6, 8–11, 13
(United States) UOP Shadow Racing	Shadow-Ford	DN1; DN3	Ford Cosworth DFV 3.0 V8	G	16	(United States) Peter Revson	1–2
(United States) UOP Shadow Racing	Shadow-Ford	DN1; DN3	Ford Cosworth DFV 3.0 V8	G	16	(United Kingdom) Brian Redman	4–6
(United States) UOP Shadow Racing	Shadow-Ford	DN1; DN3	Ford Cosworth DFV 3.0 V8	G	16	(Sweden) Bertil Roos	7
(United States) UOP Shadow Racing	Shadow-Ford	DN1; DN3	Ford Cosworth DFV 3.0 V8	G	16	(United Kingdom) Tom Pryce	8–15
(United States) UOP Shadow Racing	Shadow-Ford	DN1; DN3	Ford Cosworth DFV 3.0 V8	G	17	(France) Jean-Pierre Jarier	1–2, 4–15
(United Kingdom) Team Surtees (United Kingdom) Bang & Olufsen Team Surtees (United Kingdom) Memphis International Team Surtees	Surtees-Ford	TS16	Ford Cosworth DFV 3.0 V8	F	18	(Brazil) Carlos Pace	1–7
(United Kingdom) Team Surtees (United Kingdom) Bang & Olufsen Team Surtees (United Kingdom) Memphis International Team Surtees	Surtees-Ford	TS16	Ford Cosworth DFV 3.0 V8	F	18	(France) José Dolhem	9, 15
(United Kingdom) Team Surtees (United Kingdom) Bang & Olufsen Team Surtees (United Kingdom) Memphis International Team Surtees	Surtees-Ford	TS16	Ford Cosworth DFV 3.0 V8	F	18	(United Kingdom) Derek Bell	10–14
(United Kingdom) Team Surtees (United Kingdom) Bang & Olufsen Team Surtees (United Kingdom) Memphis International Team Surtees	Surtees-Ford	TS16	Ford Cosworth DFV 3.0 V8	F	19	(West Germany) Jochen Mass	1–11
(United Kingdom) Team Surtees (United Kingdom) Bang & Olufsen Team Surtees (United Kingdom) Memphis International Team Surtees	Surtees-Ford	TS16	Ford Cosworth DFV 3.0 V8	F	19	(France) Jean-Pierre Jabouille	12
(United Kingdom) Team Surtees (United Kingdom) Bang & Olufsen Team Surtees (United Kingdom) Memphis International Team Surtees	Surtees-Ford	TS16	Ford Cosworth DFV 3.0 V8	F	19	(France) José Dolhem	13
(United Kingdom) Team Surtees (United Kingdom) Bang & Olufsen Team Surtees (United Kingdom) Memphis International Team Surtees	Surtees-Ford	TS16	Ford Cosworth DFV 3.0 V8	F	19	(Austria) Helmut Koinigg	14–15
(United Kingdom) Team Surtees (United Kingdom) Bang & Olufsen Team Surtees (United Kingdom) Memphis International Team Surtees	Surtees-Ford	TS16	Ford Cosworth DFV 3.0 V8	F	30	(Austria) Dieter Quester	12
(United Kingdom) Frank Williams Racing Cars	Iso-Marlboro-Ford	FW	Ford Cosworth DFV 3.0 V8	F	20	(Italy) Arturo Merzario	All
(United Kingdom) Frank Williams Racing Cars	Iso-Marlboro-Ford	FW	Ford Cosworth DFV 3.0 V8	F	20	(United Kingdom) Richard Robarts	7
(United Kingdom) Frank Williams Racing Cars	Iso-Marlboro-Ford	FW	Ford Cosworth DFV 3.0 V8	F	21	(Denmark) Tom Belsø	3–4, 7, 10
(United Kingdom) Frank Williams Racing Cars	Iso-Marlboro-Ford	FW	Ford Cosworth DFV 3.0 V8	F	21	(Netherlands) Gijs van Lennep	5, 8
(United Kingdom) Frank Williams Racing Cars	Iso-Marlboro-Ford	FW	Ford Cosworth DFV 3.0 V8	F	21	(France) Jean-Pierre Jabouille	9
(United Kingdom) Frank Williams Racing Cars	Iso-Marlboro-Ford	FW	Ford Cosworth DFV 3.0 V8	F	21	(France) Jacques Laffite	11–15
(United Kingdom) Team Ensign (United Kingdom) Team Ensign with Theodore Racing (United Kingdom) Dempster International Team Ensign	Ensign-Ford	N174	Ford Cosworth DFV 3.0 V8	F	22	(Liechtenstein) Rikky von Opel	1
(United Kingdom) Team Ensign (United Kingdom) Team Ensign with Theodore Racing (United Kingdom) Dempster International Team Ensign	Ensign-Ford	N174	Ford Cosworth DFV 3.0 V8	F	22	(Australia) Vern Schuppan	5–11
(United Kingdom) Team Ensign (United Kingdom) Team Ensign with Theodore Racing (United Kingdom) Dempster International Team Ensign	Ensign-Ford	N174	Ford Cosworth DFV 3.0 V8	F	22	(United Kingdom) Mike Wilds	12, 14–15
(United Kingdom) Team Ensign (United Kingdom) Team Ensign with Theodore Racing (United Kingdom) Dempster International Team Ensign	Ensign-Ford	N174	Ford Cosworth DFV 3.0 V8	F	25	(United Kingdom) Mike Wilds	13
(South Africa) Scribante Lucky Strike Racing	McLaren-Ford	M23	Ford Cosworth DFV 3.0 V8	G	23	(South Africa) Dave Charlton	3
(United Kingdom) Trojan-Tauranac Racing	Trojan-Ford	T103	Ford Cosworth DFV 3.0 V8	F	23	(Australia) Tim Schenken	4, 6, 8, 10–12
(United Kingdom) Trojan-Tauranac Racing	Trojan-Ford	T103	Ford Cosworth DFV 3.0 V8	F	29	(Australia) Tim Schenken	13
(United Kingdom) Trojan-Tauranac Racing	Trojan-Ford	T103	Ford Cosworth DFV 3.0 V8	F	41	(Australia) Tim Schenken	5
(Finland) AAW Racing Team	Surtees-Ford	TS16	Ford Cosworth DFV 3.0 V8	F	23	(Finland) Leo Kinnunen	7, 9, 13
(Finland) AAW Racing Team	Surtees-Ford	TS16	Ford Cosworth DFV 3.0 V8	F	43	(Finland) Leo Kinnunen	10, 12
(Finland) AAW Racing Team	Surtees-Ford	TS16	Ford Cosworth DFV 3.0 V8	F	44	(Finland) Leo Kinnunen	5
(United Kingdom) Hesketh Racing	March-Ford Hesketh-Ford	731; 308	Ford Cosworth DFV 3.0 V8	F G	24	(United Kingdom) James Hunt	All
(United Kingdom) Hesketh Racing	March-Ford Hesketh-Ford	731; 308	Ford Cosworth DFV 3.0 V8	F G	31	(South Africa) Ian Scheckter	12
(Japan) Maki Engineering	Maki-Ford	F101	Ford Cosworth DFV 3.0 V8	F	25	(New Zealand) Howden Ganley	10–11
(United Kingdom) Embassy Racing with Graham Hill	Lola-Ford	T370	Ford Cosworth DFV 3.0 V8	F	26	(United Kingdom) Graham Hill	All
(United Kingdom) Embassy Racing with Graham Hill	Lola-Ford	T370	Ford Cosworth DFV 3.0 V8	F	27	(United Kingdom) Guy Edwards	1–2, 4–11
(United Kingdom) Embassy Racing with Graham Hill	Lola-Ford	T370	Ford Cosworth DFV 3.0 V8	F	27	(United Kingdom) Peter Gethin	10
(United Kingdom) Embassy Racing with Graham Hill	Lola-Ford	T370	Ford Cosworth DFV 3.0 V8	F	27	(West Germany) Rolf Stommelen	12–15
(United Kingdom) John Goldie Racing with Hexagon (United Kingdom) John Goldie Racing with Radio Luxembourg (United Kingdom) Allied Polymer Group	Brabham-Ford	BT42; BT44	Ford Cosworth DFV 3.0 V8	F	28	(United Kingdom) John Watson	All
(United Kingdom) John Goldie Racing with Hexagon (United Kingdom) John Goldie Racing with Radio Luxembourg (United Kingdom) Allied Polymer Group	Brabham-Ford	BT42; BT44	Ford Cosworth DFV 3.0 V8	F	34	(Brazil) Carlos Pace	9
(United Kingdom) John Goldie Racing with Hexagon (United Kingdom) John Goldie Racing with Radio Luxembourg (United Kingdom) Allied Polymer Group	Brabham-Ford	BT42; BT44	Ford Cosworth DFV 3.0 V8	G	208	(Italy) Lella Lombardi	10
(United Kingdom) Pinch Plant Ltd	Lyncar-Ford	006	Ford Cosworth DFV 3.0 V8	F	29	(New Zealand) John Nicholson	10
(South Africa) Team Gunston	Lotus-Ford	72E	Ford Cosworth DFV 3.0 V8	G	29	(South Africa) Ian Scheckter	3
(South Africa) Team Gunston	Lotus-Ford	72E	Ford Cosworth DFV 3.0 V8	G	30	(South Africa) Paddy Driver	3
(New Zealand) Dalton-Amon International	Amon-Ford	AF101	Ford Cosworth DFV 3.0 V8	F	30	(New Zealand) Chris Amon	4, 6, 11
(New Zealand) Dalton-Amon International	Amon-Ford	AF101	Ford Cosworth DFV 3.0 V8	F	22	(New Zealand) Chris Amon	13
(New Zealand) Dalton-Amon International	Amon-Ford	AF101	Ford Cosworth DFV 3.0 V8	F	30	(Australia) Larry Perkins	11
(United Kingdom) Dempster International Racing Team	March-Ford	731	Ford Cosworth DFV 3.0 V8	F	35	(United Kingdom) Mike Wilds	10
(Italy) Scuderia Finotto	Brabham-Ford	BT42	Ford Cosworth DFV 3.0 V8	F	31	(Italy) Carlo Facetti	13
(Italy) Scuderia Finotto	Brabham-Ford	BT42	Ford Cosworth DFV 3.0 V8	F	32	(Austria) Helmut Koinigg	12
(Italy) Scuderia Finotto	Brabham-Ford	BT42	Ford Cosworth DFV 3.0 V8	F	43	(France) Gérard Larrousse	5, 9
(South Africa) Blignaut Embassy Racing	Tyrrell-Ford	004	Ford Cosworth DFV 3.0 V8	F	32	(South Africa) Eddie Keizan	3
(United Kingdom) Token Racing	Token-Ford	RJ02	Ford Cosworth DFV 3.0 V8	F	32	(United Kingdom) Ian Ashley	11
(United Kingdom) Token Racing	Token-Ford	RJ02	Ford Cosworth DFV 3.0 V8	F	35	(United Kingdom) Ian Ashley	12
(United Kingdom) Token Racing	Token-Ford	RJ02	Ford Cosworth DFV 3.0 V8	F	42	(United Kingdom) Tom Pryce	5
(United Kingdom) Token Racing	Token-Ford	RJ02	Ford Cosworth DFV 3.0 V8	F	42	(United Kingdom) David Purley	10
(United Kingdom) The Chequered Flag Racing with Richard Oaten	Brabham-Ford	BT42	Ford Cosworth DFV 3.0 V8	G	42	(United Kingdom) Ian Ashley	14–15
Team Canada F1 Racing	Brabham-Ford	BT42	Ford Cosworth DFV 3.0 V8	G	50	(Canada) Eppie Wietzes	14
(United States) Vel's Parnelli Jones Racing	Parnelli-Ford	VPJ4	Ford Cosworth DFV 3.0 V8	F	55	(United States) Mario Andretti	14–15
(United States) Penske Cars	Penske-Ford	PC1	Ford Cosworth DFV 3.0 V8	G	66	(United States) Mark Donohue	14–15

=== Team and driver changes ===
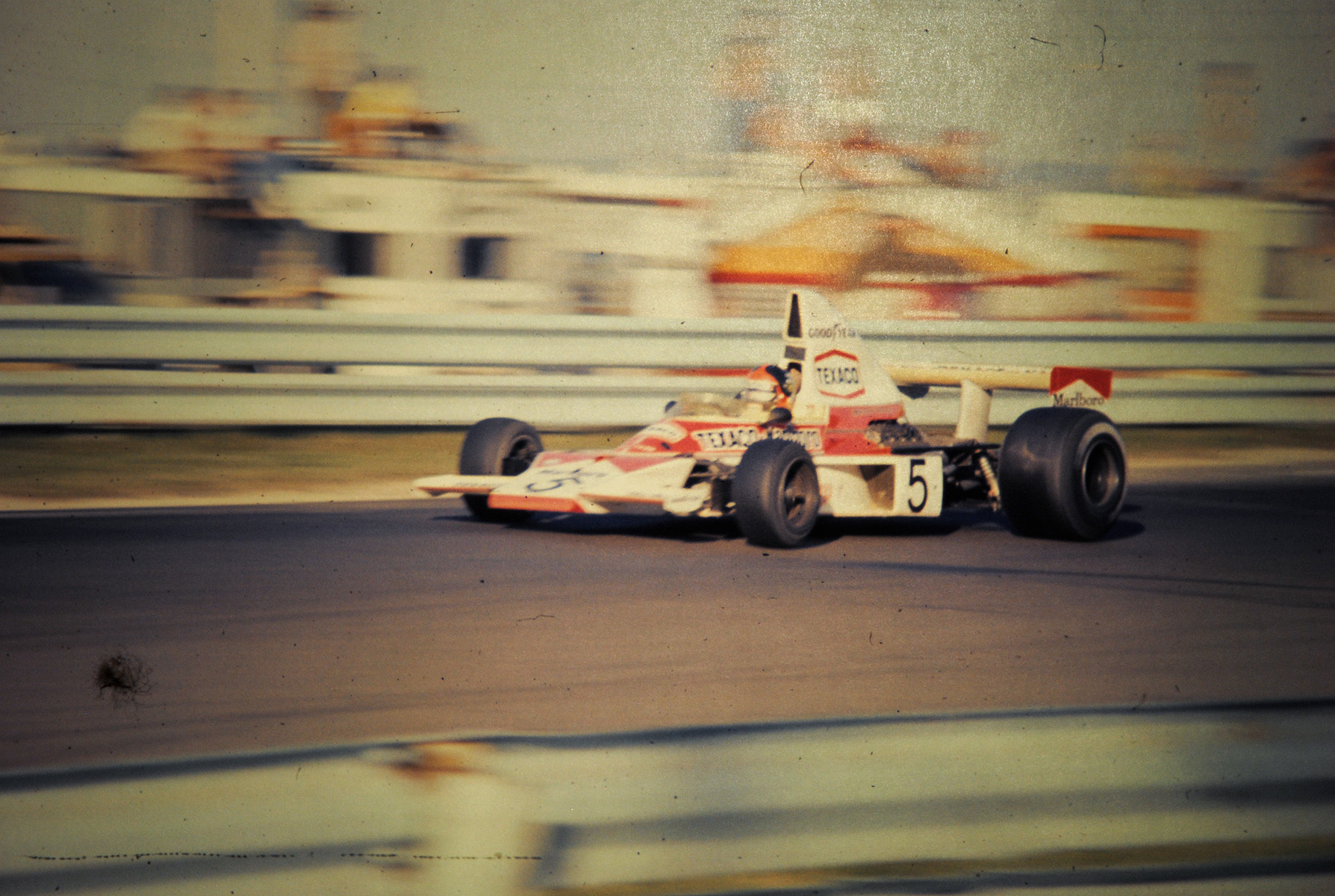
Emerson Fittipaldi moved from Lotus to McLaren.

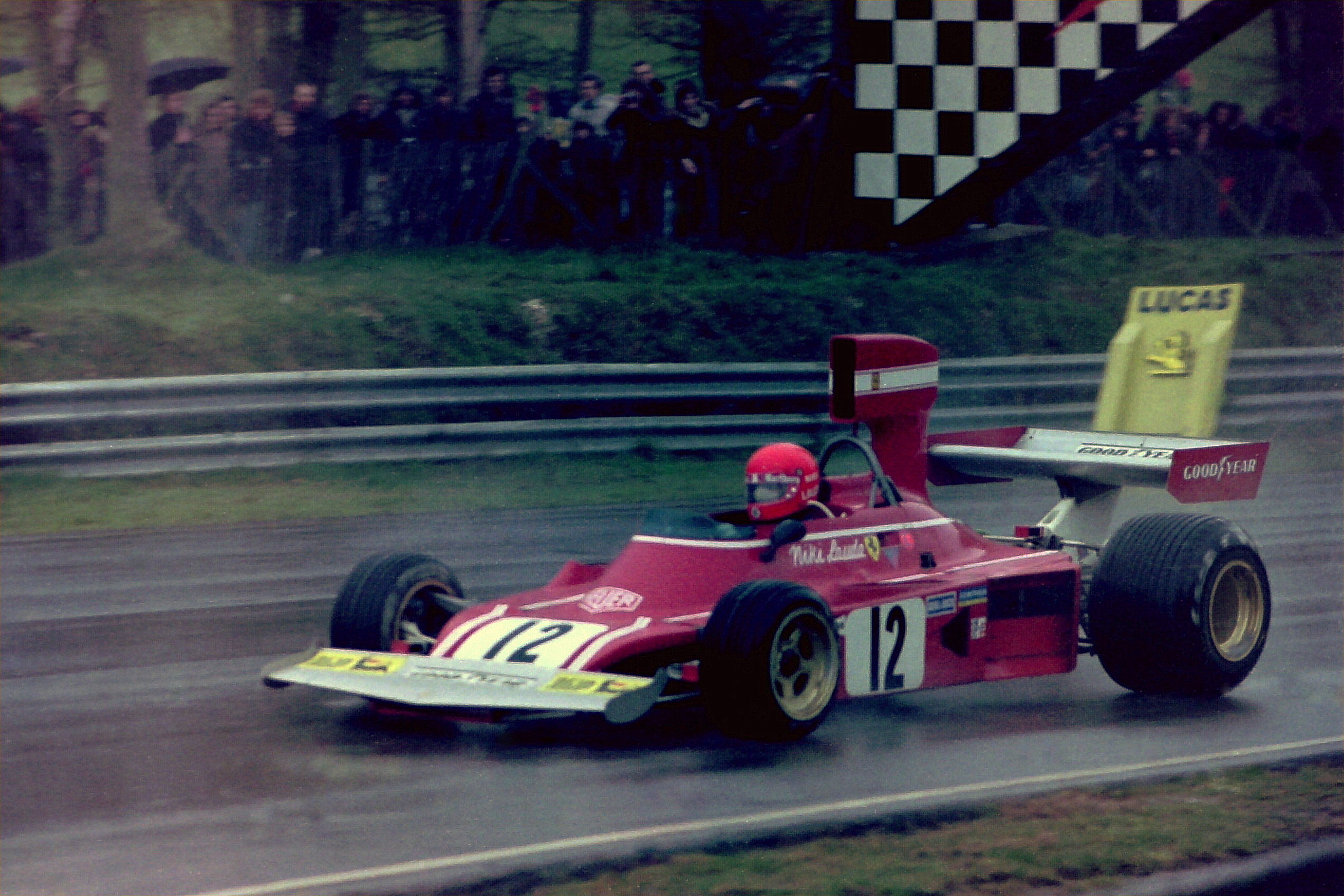
Niki Lauda was signed at Ferrari, after a recommendation by Clay Regazzoni.

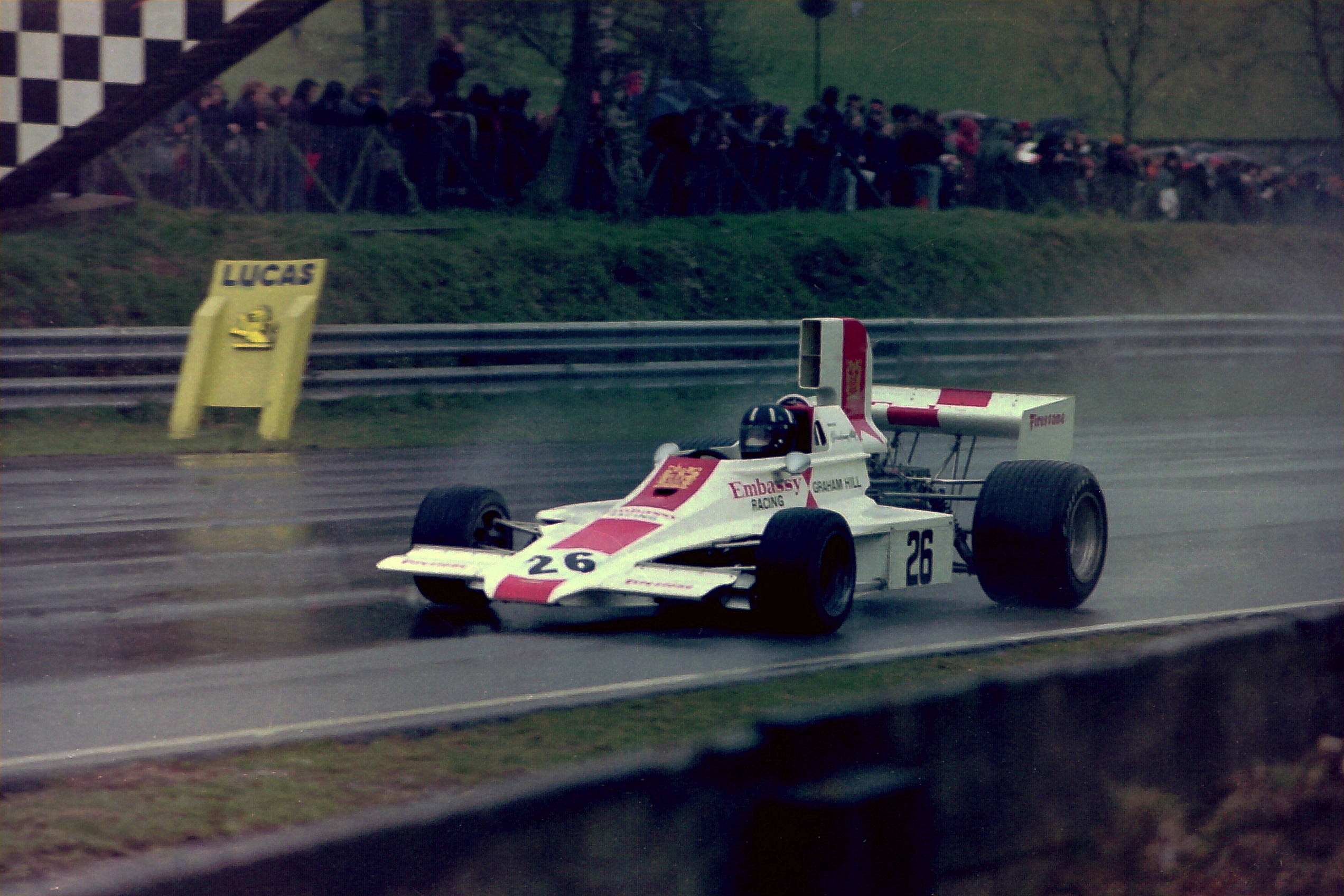
Graham Hill during the non-championship "1974 Race of Champions"

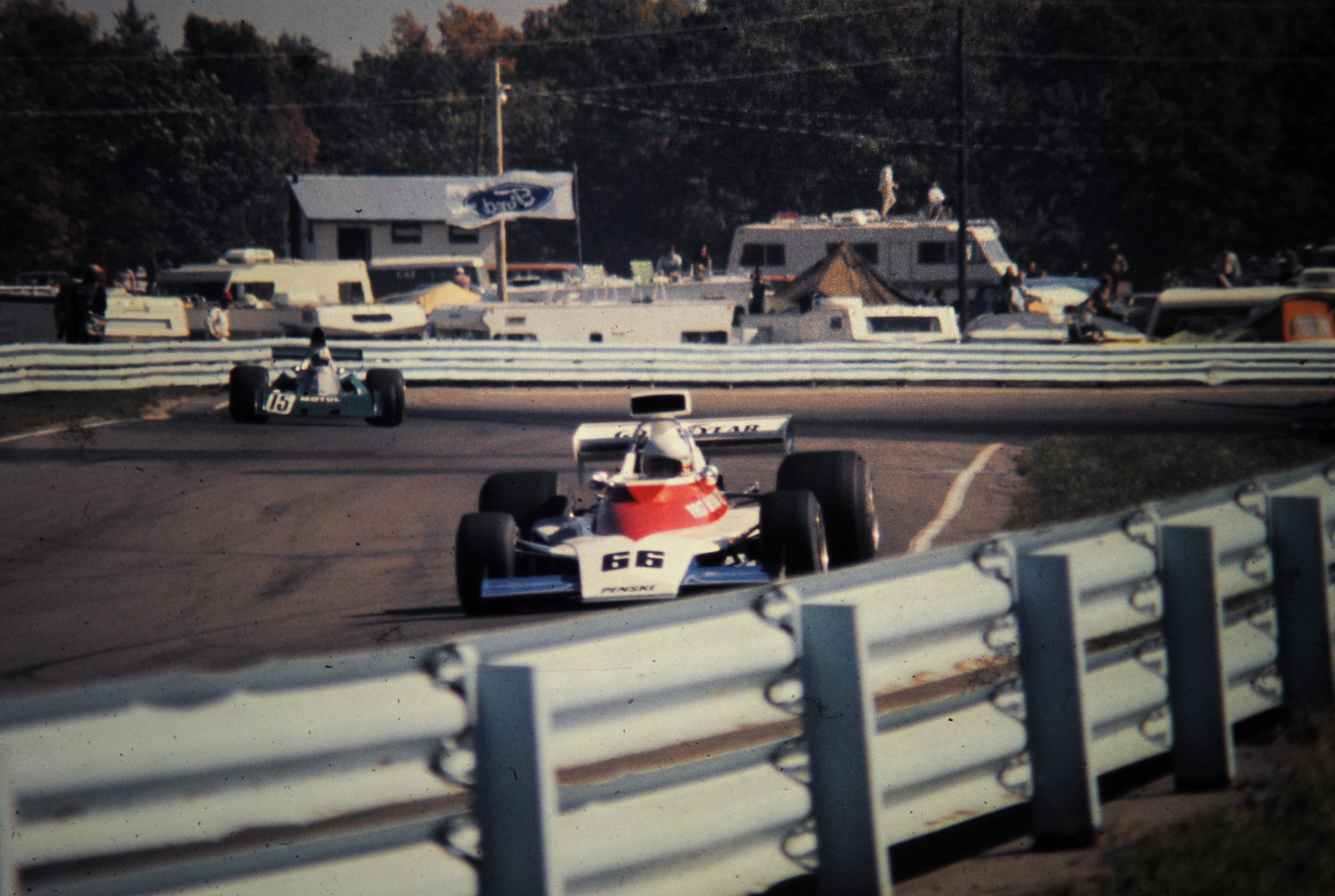
Mark Donohue in the Penske, being followed by Chris Amon in the BRM

A relatively large number of driver changes had happened over the winter:

- After winning the 1972 championship but then struggling in the second half of 1973, Emerson Fittipaldi left Lotus for McLaren. Mike Hailwood moved up from Surtees to partner him. Fittipaldi's seat at Lotus was taken up by Jacky Ickx from Ferrari.
- New Ferrari boss Luca di Montezemolo signed both 1973 BRM drivers, Clay Regazzoni and Niki Lauda. Ex-Ferrari driver Arturo Merzario found a seat at Williams (entered as Iso-Marlboro), while BRM hired Henri Pescarolo and François Migault next to Jean-Pierre Beltoise who had stayed.
- After François Cevert had died and Jackie Stewart retired, Tyrrell signed Jody Scheckter from McLaren and Formula Two driver Patrick Depailler.
- Ex-McLaren driver Peter Revson found a seat at Shadow next to Jean-Pierre Jarier, coming from March. After having driven part-time for them in 1973, Jochen Mass drove a full season for Surtees.
- Wilson Fittipaldi had left Brabham to prepare and set up his own F1 team for 1974. Richard Robarts paid to take up the seat at the British team.
- March promoted their F2 driver Hans-Joachim Stuck to their F1 team, next to Howden Ganley from Williams.
- Graham Hill's Embassy Racing entered a Lola chassis after running a Shadow in 1973. The Hesketh team entered its self-made chassis after running a privatised March last year.

==== Mid-season changes ====
During the season, five teams debuted with their self-made chassis:

- In the Spanish Grand Prix, Chris Amon debuted with his first own chassis, but later, gave up the effort for a drive at BRM.
- In the same race, Trojan-Tauranac Racing hired Tim Schenken to drive their car that was a development from their Formula 5000 chassis.
- Token Racing (the name inspired by the owners' first names, Tony and Ken) made their debut at the Belgian Grand Prix with Tom Pryce at the wheel.
- Famous America racing team Penske entered the Canadian and United States GP's with their own chassis. Mark Donohue was hired to drive.
- In the same two races, Parnelli Jones entered a car inspired by the Lotus 72, financially supported by Firestone, and future champion Mario Andretti at the wheel.

These are some of the mid-season driver changes:

- After two races, March replaced Howden Ganley with Formula Two driver Vittorio Brambilla.
- Peter Revson was killed during practice for the South African Grand Prix when his Shadow suffered suspension failure and crashed into the armco barrier. Shadow subsequently hired F5000 driver Brian Redman, F2 driver Bertil Roos, and Tom Pryce, who had made his debut with Token earlier in the year.
- Richard Robarts was let go by Brabham when a better-funded Rikky von Opel came in. Carlos Pace moved up from Surtees to finish the season at Brabham.
- Mike Hailwood left F1 after heavily crashing his McLaren at the German Grand Prix. David Hobbs returned to F1 after three years to take over, before Jochen Mass moved up from Surtees.
- Helmut Koinigg was killed during the United States Grand Prix in an accident reminiscent of Cevert's accident at the same track the year before. When his car hit the barrier, it split on impact, and Koinigg was decapitated. Surtees decreased their operations to one car for the next season.

== Calendar ==
Round	Grand Prix	Circuit	Date
1	Argentine Grand Prix	(Argentina) Autódromo de Buenos Aires, Buenos Aires	13 January
2	Brazilian Grand Prix	(Brazil) Autodromo de Interlagos, São Paulo	27 January
3	South African Grand Prix	(South Africa) Kyalami Grand Prix Circuit, Midrand	30 March
4	Spanish Grand Prix	(Spain) Circuito Permanente del Jarama, Madrid	28 April
5	Belgian Grand Prix	(Belgium) Nivelles-Baulers, Nivelles	12 May
6	Monaco Grand Prix	Circuit de Monaco, Monte Carlo	26 May
7	Swedish Grand Prix	(Sweden) Scandinavian Raceway, Anderstorp	9 June
8	Dutch Grand Prix	(Netherlands) Circuit Park Zandvoort, Zandvoort	23 June
9	French Grand Prix	(France) Circuit de Dijon-Prenois, Prenois	7 July
10	British Grand Prix	(United Kingdom) Brands Hatch, Kent	20 July
11	German Grand Prix	(West Germany) Nürburgring, Nürburg	4 August
12	Austrian Grand Prix	(Austria) Österreichring, Spielberg	18 August
13	Italian Grand Prix	(Italy) Autodromo Nazionale di Monza, Monza	8 September
14	Canadian Grand Prix	(Canada) Mosport Park, Bowmanville	22 September
15	United States Grand Prix	(United States) Watkins Glen International, New York	6 October

=== Calendar changes ===
- The Spanish Grand Prix was moved from Montjuïc to Jarama, in keeping with the event-sharing arrangement between the two circuits. Likewise, the Belgian Grand Prix was moved from Circuit Zolder to Nivelles-Baulers, and the British Grand Prix was moved from Silverstone to Brands Hatch.
- The Dutch Grand Prix was moved up from late July to mid June.
- The French Grand Prix was moved from Charade to the newly built Dijon-Prenois circuit.

== Regulation changes ==
=== Technical regulations ===
Selfseal breakaway fuel couplings were mandated to reduce the chance of a fire in accidents.

=== Sporting regulations ===
- The 1974 season was the first in which teams had permanent racing numbers from race to race, after the system had been instituted in the 1973 Belgian Grand Prix. The numbers were based on the teams' finishing positions in the 1973 Constructors' Championship. From this point, each team only changed numbers if they had the driver who had won the World Drivers' Championship – the winning driver taking the number 1 and his teammate the number 2, and the team that had previously had those numbers switching to the newly vacated ones. (This made the 1974 season an anomaly, as there was no World Champion, since Jackie Stewart had retired. Ronnie Peterson took the number 1 as he was team leader at Constructors' Champion Lotus; when the situation arose again in 1993 and 1994, the number 0 was used instead. The only other driver who was not a reigning World Champion but raced with number 1 was John Watson while replacing Niki Lauda at McLaren at the 1985 European Grand Prix). This system meant that, for example, Tyrrell – who never again won either title – maintained the numbers 3 and 4 right through until the system was changed in 1996.
- For the first time, it was mandated precisely how drivers should line up on the grid before the start of the race: in a two-by-two staggered pattern, with 12 12 m (39 ft) between each row of two cars.

== Season report ==
=== Race 1: Argentina ===
In qualifying for the opening round in Argentina, Ronnie Peterson took pole in his Lotus ahead of Clay Regazzoni's Ferrari and Emerson Fittipaldi's McLaren. Peterson led at the start, whereas fellow front-row starter Regazzoni spun, causing chaos. Fittipaldi was hit by teammate Mike Hailwood and lost two laps while repairing his car, and James Hunt inherited second whereas Peter Revson, who started fourth, retired in the chaos. Hunt spun before the first lap was over, and second place went to Carlos Reutemann's Brabham.

Reutemann passed Peterson on the third lap, and soon the Swede began to fade badly with brake problems. As a result, Mike Hailwood and Denny Hulme in their McLarens were second and third, ahead of Jacky Ickx and Niki Lauda in the second Lotus and Ferrari. Hulme, Ickx and Lauda all passed Hailwood and then Ickx suffered a puncture mid-race and had to pit. Regazzoni was recovering from his spin, and passed Hailwood soon after. Reutemann continued to lead until his engine began to misfire, with Hulme closing in and taking the lead on the penultimate lap. Hulme went on to win, with Lauda and Regazzoni completing the podium after Reutemann ran out of fuel on the last lap.

=== Race 2: Brazil ===
Fittipaldi took a popular home pole in Brazil, beating Reutemann and Lauda. Reutemann, eager to make up after his bad luck in Argentina, took the lead at the start, with Peterson up to second. Reutemann led early on, but was passed by both Peterson and Fittipaldi on lap 4. Peterson battled with former Lotus teammate Fittipaldi for the next 12 laps, until he suffered a slow puncture. Fittipaldi passed him and took the lead, whereas Peterson dropped backwards. Fittipaldi went on to take a home victory, with Regazzoni getting second and Ickx third.

=== Race 3: South Africa ===
The field went to South Africa after a two-month break. Lauda took pole position, with Carlos Pace's Surtees also on the front row. Arturo Merzario in the Iso-Marlboro team was an amazing third on the grid. At the start, Lauda took the lead, whereas surprise packages Pace and Merzario were soon swamped by the field. Reutemann was up to second, and he took the lead from Lauda on the tenth lap, and he would remain ahead for the rest of the afternoon. Regazzoni was third ahead of Fittipaldi and Hailwood, but soon Jean-Pierre Beltoise's BRM soon passed the two McLarens, as Fittipaldi began to drop back. Lauda and Regazzoni both retired very late in the race when their engines blew up, and thus Beltoise and Hailwood completed the podium behind Reutemann.

=== Race 4: Spain ===
The first European round of the championship was in Spain, and it was Lauda who took pole ahead of Peterson and Regazzoni. On race day, the track was wet but drying, and Peterson was able to beat Lauda off the line. Regazzoni and Ickx followed. The Lotuses and the Ferraris battled until Peterson's engine failed and Ickx lost a wheel which was not fastened properly after the stop for slicks. This left Lauda to take his first career win, and Regazzoni to complete a Ferrari 1–2, with Fittipaldi third.

=== Race 5: Belgium ===
The next race was in Belgium, and Regazzoni continued Ferrari's streak of poles, and Jody Scheckter's Tyrrell taking second with Lauda third. Regazzoni led in the early stages, with Fittipaldi climbing up to second in the first lap. Later, Lauda passed Scheckter for third, and this became second when Regazzoni went to the grass after an incident with a backmarker. Fittipaldi thus won the race, from Lauda, with Scheckter third after Regazzoni suffered fuel feed problems on the last lap.

=== Race 6: Monaco ===
In the streets of Monaco, Lauda and Regazzoni took the front row for Ferrari, with Peterson's Lotus behind them in third. The Ferraris motored away, with Regazzoni leading after beating his teammate off the line, with Peterson down in sixth. Regazzoni led until he made a mistake and spun off, rejoining fifth. Lauda was now leading Jean-Pierre Jarier's Shadow, Peterson and Scheckter. Peterson disposed of Jarier, and took the lead when Lauda's engine blew up. Peterson went on to win, with Scheckter taking second from Jarier.

=== Race 7: Sweden ===
The Tyrrells were dominant in qualifying, with Patrick Depailler taking the pole from Jody Scheckter, with the Ferraris of Lauda and Regazzoni on the second row. Scheckter passed his teammate to take the lead at the start, with Peterson gaining three places to jump up to second. It was all to no avail, because he retired in the opening laps with a driveshaft failure. The Tyrrells were now up front, with the Ferraris behind them. The gearboxes of both Ferraris failed and both retired, promoting James Hunt in the Hesketh to third. Scheckter duly won, with Depailler completing a dominant 1–2 for Tyrrell, with Hunt third.

=== Race 8: Netherlands ===
The Netherlands was host to the eighth round, and Lauda took his fourth pole of the year, with teammate Regazzoni alongside, and the McLarens of Fittipaldi and Hailwood next up. Lauda led from the start, will Hailwood jumping up to second. But Regazzoni took only two laps to regain second, and Hailwood was soon passed by Depailler and Fittipaldi. Depailler held third until he struggled with oversteer, and so Fittipaldi was through. Lauda won, with Regazzoni making it a 1–2 for Ferrari, with Fittipaldi getting third.

=== Race 9: France ===
Lauda took pole again in France, with Peterson in second, and Tom Pryce in the Shadow a surprising third. Lauda and Peterson maintained their positions at the start, whereas Pryce collided with Hunt and Carlos Reutemann, with all three retiring as Regazzoni took third. Lauda and Peterson battled it out in the early stages, but soon Lauda began to suffer from a vibration and Peterson was able to pass him and pull away. Peterson went on to win, with Lauda managing second, and Regazzoni third.

=== Race 10: Great Britain ===
Great Britain was host to the tenth round of the championship, and Lauda surprised no one by taking pole, with Peterson again alongside and Scheckter third. At the start, Lauda led, whereas Peterson dropped behind Scheckter and Regazzoni. The order of Lauda, Scheckter, Regazzoni and Peterson remained unchanged for the first half of the race until Regazzoni and Peterson had to pit for new tyres after running over debris. Late in the race, leader Lauda suffered a puncture, and the lead went to Scheckter. Scheckter duly won, with Fittipaldi getting second and Jacky Ickx third.

As a result, with exactly two-thirds of the championship gone, the championship was an extremely close four-way battle. Lauda led with 38 points, but he was only a point ahead of Fittipaldi, with Regazzoni and Scheckter lurking three points behind.

=== Race 11: Germany ===
The third part of the championship started in Germany at the 14.2 mile (22.8 km) Nürburgring circuit, and Lauda took pole as usual, and Regazzoni ensured that Ferrari locked out the front row, with other contenders Fittipaldi third and Scheckter fourth. Regazzoni took the lead at the start, whereas Lauda and Scheckter collided on the first lap at the Nord Kurve with the former retiring, and the latter continuing unscathed in second. Fittipaldi suffered a puncture and had to pit. Regazzoni went on to win and take the championship lead, with Scheckter second and Reutemann third.

=== Race 12: Austria ===
Lauda took his eighth pole position of the championship, and fifth consecutive, in his home round in Austria with Reutemann and Fittipaldi second and third on the grid. Reutemann got the better of Lauda at the start, with Regazzoni fourth behind the second Brabham of Carlos Pace, and Fittipaldi down to seventh behind Scheckter. Scheckter retired with a blown engine, whereas Regazzoni soon passed Pace. Lauda soon dropped down the order with a misfiring engine and soon retired. Regazzoni was second, and Fittipaldi was third after passing Pace. However. Fittipaldi's engine also blew up, and Regazzoni dropped back and ultimately had to bit with a slow puncture. Reutemann took the victory, with Denny Hulme second and James Hunt third. Regazzoni recovered to finish fifth and get two points, whereas his other rivals scored none.

=== Race 13: Italy ===
The Ferrari fans were happy to see Lauda take pole for the Italian GP, with the Brabhams of Reutemann and Pace following him on the grid. The start did not change the positions, with Lauda leading Reutemann and Pace. Soon, Regazzoni passed both the Brabhams to and then Reutemann retired with a gearbox failure and Pace had to pit with tyre troubles. This left Lauda leading Regazzoni for the perfect Ferrari 1–2, a long way ahead of third-placed Peterson. That was not to last as Lauda retired with a water leak, handing the lead to Regazzoni but Regazzoni's engine failed 10 laps later. Peterson took the lead and won, holding off Fittipaldi and Scheckter finished third to close up the championship.

=== Race 14: Canada ===
The penultimate round of the championship was in Canada, and Fittipaldi took pole, just beating Lauda with Scheckter third. Lauda took Fittipaldi off the line and led, with Regazzoni up to third ahead of Scheckter, but Scheckter retook the position on the second lap. The four contenders were occupying the first four spots – Lauda leading Fittipaldi, Scheckter and Regazzoni. But Scheckter crashed after suffering a brake failure, and then Lauda crashed out late in the race after running over debris, ending his championship hopes. Fittipaldi won the race from Regazzoni, with Peterson completing the podium.

This meant that Fittipaldi and Regazzoni were level on points into the last race, with Scheckter the outsider seven points behind.

=== Race 15: United States ===
The championship decider was to be held at the United States. Reutemann took pole with Hunt alongside on the front row, with home hero Mario Andretti third in a Parnelli. Scheckter was sixth, whereas Fittipaldi and Regazzoni were eighth and ninth. Reutemann converted his pole to a lead at the start, with Hunt second and Pace third after Andretti stalled. Behind Lauda was Scheckter, Fittipaldi and Regazzoni running together. The front three quickly pulled away, as Lauda held up Scheckter and Fittipaldi in an attempt to help Regazzoni. However, Regazzoni was struggling with handling problems and dropping back down the field. He pitted for tyres twice but found it to be no avail, and he was two laps down. Lauda and Scheckter both retired in the latter half of the race, promoting Fittipaldi to fourth. Pace took second from Hunt with four laps left, as the Englishman was suffering from fading brakes. The race was won by Reutemann, with Pace ensuring that Brabham cap off the season with a 1–2, and Hunt was third.

Emerson Fittipaldi finished fourth to ensure that he was the World Champion, beating Regazzoni by three points.

The race was marred by the death of young Austrian Helmut Koinigg when his car crashed into the wall after a puncture on the 10th lap. The barrier which the car hit split on impact, and Koinigg was decapitated.

== Results and standings ==
=== Grands Prix ===
Round	Grand Prix	Pole position	Fastest lap	Winning driver	Winning constructor	Tyre	Report
1	(Argentina) Argentine Grand Prix	(Sweden) Ronnie Peterson	(Switzerland) Clay Regazzoni	(New Zealand) Denny Hulme	(United Kingdom) McLaren-Ford	G	Report
2	(Brazil) Brazilian Grand Prix	(Brazil) Emerson Fittipaldi	(Switzerland) Clay Regazzoni	(Brazil) Emerson Fittipaldi	(United Kingdom) McLaren-Ford	G	Report
3	(South Africa) South African Grand Prix	(Austria) Niki Lauda	(Argentina) Carlos Reutemann	(Argentina) Carlos Reutemann	(United Kingdom) Brabham-Ford	G	Report
4	(Spain) Spanish Grand Prix	(Austria) Niki Lauda	(Austria) Niki Lauda	(Austria) Niki Lauda	(Italy) Ferrari	G	Report
5	(Belgium) Belgian Grand Prix	(Switzerland) Clay Regazzoni	(New Zealand) Denny Hulme	(Brazil) Emerson Fittipaldi	(United Kingdom) McLaren-Ford	G	Report
6	Monaco Grand Prix	(Austria) Niki Lauda	(Sweden) Ronnie Peterson	(Sweden) Ronnie Peterson	(United Kingdom) Lotus-Ford	G	Report
7	(Sweden) Swedish Grand Prix	(France) Patrick Depailler	(France) Patrick Depailler	(South Africa) Jody Scheckter	(United Kingdom) Tyrrell-Ford	G	Report
8	(Netherlands) Dutch Grand Prix	(Austria) Niki Lauda	(Sweden) Ronnie Peterson	(Austria) Niki Lauda	(Italy) Ferrari	G	Report
9	(France) French Grand Prix	(Austria) Niki Lauda	(South Africa) Jody Scheckter	(Sweden) Ronnie Peterson	(United Kingdom) Lotus-Ford	G	Report
10	(United Kingdom) British Grand Prix	(Austria) Niki Lauda	(Austria) Niki Lauda	(South Africa) Jody Scheckter	(United Kingdom) Tyrrell-Ford	G	Report
11	(West Germany) German Grand Prix	(Austria) Niki Lauda	(South Africa) Jody Scheckter	(Switzerland) Clay Regazzoni	(Italy) Ferrari	G	Report
12	(Austria) Austrian Grand Prix	(Austria) Niki Lauda	(Switzerland) Clay Regazzoni	(Argentina) Carlos Reutemann	(United Kingdom) Brabham-Ford	G	Report
13	(Italy) Italian Grand Prix	(Austria) Niki Lauda	(Brazil) Carlos Pace	(Sweden) Ronnie Peterson	(United Kingdom) Lotus-Ford	G	Report
14	(Canada) Canadian Grand Prix	(Brazil) Emerson Fittipaldi	(Austria) Niki Lauda	(Brazil) Emerson Fittipaldi	(United Kingdom) McLaren-Ford	G	Report
15	United States Grand Prix	(Argentina) Carlos Reutemann	(Brazil) Carlos Pace	(Argentina) Carlos Reutemann	(United Kingdom) Brabham-Ford	G	Report

=== Scoring system ===
Points were awarded to the top six classified finishers. The International Cup for F1 Manufacturers only counted the points of the highest-finishing driver for each race. For both the Championship and the Cup, the best seven results from rounds 1-8 and the best six results from rounds 9-15 were counted.

Numbers without parentheses are championship points; numbers in parentheses are total points scored. Points were awarded in the following system:

Position	1st	2nd	3rd	4th	5th	6th
Race	9	6	4	3	2	1

=== World Drivers' Championship standings ===
Pos	Driver	ARG (Argentina)	BRA (Brazil)	RSA (South Africa)	ESP (Spain)	BEL (Belgium)	MON (Monaco)	SWE (Sweden)	NED (Netherlands)	FRA (France)	GBR (United Kingdom)	GER (West Germany)	AUT (Austria)	ITA (Italy)	CAN (Canada)	USA (United States)	Pts
1	(Brazil) Emerson Fittipaldi	10	1^{P}	7	3	1	5	4	3	Ret	2	Ret	Ret	2	1^{P}	4	55
2	(Switzerland) Clay Regazzoni	3^{F}	2^{F}	Ret	2	4^{P}	4	Ret	2	3	4	1	5^{F}	Ret	2	11	52
3	(South Africa) Jody Scheckter	Ret	13	8	5	3	2	1	5	4^{F}	1	2^{F}	Ret	3	Ret	Ret	45
4	(Austria) Niki Lauda	2	Ret	16^{P}	1^{P}^{F}	2	Ret^{P}	Ret	1^{P}	2^{P}	5^{P}^{F}	Ret^{P}	Ret^{P}	Ret^{P}	Ret^{F}	Ret	38
5	(Sweden) Ronnie Peterson	13^{P}	6	Ret	Ret	Ret	1^{F}	Ret	8^{F}	1	10	4	Ret	1	3	Ret	35
6	(Argentina) Carlos Reutemann	7	7	1^{F}	Ret	Ret	Ret	Ret	12	Ret	6	3	1	Ret	9	1^{P}	32
7	(New Zealand) Denny Hulme	1	12	9	6	6^{F}	Ret	Ret	Ret	6	7	DSQ	2	6	6	Ret	20
8	(United Kingdom) James Hunt	Ret	9	Ret	10	Ret	Ret	3	Ret	Ret	Ret	Ret	3	Ret	4	3	15
9	(France) Patrick Depailler	6	8	4	8	Ret	9	2^{P}^{F}	6	8	Ret	Ret	Ret	11	5	6	14
10	(United Kingdom) Mike Hailwood	4	5	3	9	7	Ret	Ret	4	7	Ret	15					12
=	(Belgium) Jacky Ickx	Ret	3	Ret	Ret	Ret	Ret	Ret	11	5	3	5	Ret	Ret	13	Ret	12
12	(Brazil) Carlos Pace	Ret	4	11	13	Ret	Ret	Ret		DNQ	9	12	Ret	5^{F}	8	2^{F}	11
13	(France) Jean-Pierre Beltoise	5	10	2	Ret	5	Ret	Ret	Ret	10	12	Ret	Ret	Ret	NC	DNQ	10
14	(France) Jean-Pierre Jarier	Ret	Ret		Ret	13	3	5	Ret	12	Ret	8	8	Ret	Ret	10	6
=	(United Kingdom) John Watson	12	Ret	Ret	11	11	6	11	7	16	11	Ret	4	7	Ret	5	6
16	(West Germany) Hans-Joachim Stuck	Ret	Ret	5	4	Ret	Ret		Ret	DNQ	Ret	7	11	Ret	Ret	DNQ	5
17	(Italy) Arturo Merzario	Ret	Ret	6	Ret	Ret	Ret	DNS	Ret	9	Ret	Ret	Ret	4	Ret	Ret	4
18	(Italy) Vittorio Brambilla			10	DNS	9	Ret	10	10	11	Ret	13	6	Ret	DNQ	Ret	1
=	(United Kingdom) Graham Hill	Ret	11	12	Ret	8	7	6	Ret	13	13	9	12	8	14	8	1
=	(United Kingdom) Tom Pryce					Ret			Ret	Ret	8	6	Ret	10	Ret	NC	1
—	(United Kingdom) Guy Edwards	11	Ret		DNQ	12	8	7	Ret	15	DNQ	DNQ					0
—	(United Kingdom) David Hobbs												7	9			0
—	(West Germany) Jochen Mass	Ret	17	Ret	Ret	Ret		Ret	Ret	Ret	14	Ret			16	7	0
—	(United Kingdom) Brian Redman				7	18	Ret										0
—	(United States) Mario Andretti														7	DSQ	0
—	(New Zealand) Howden Ganley	8	Ret								DNQ	DNQ					0
—	(Denmark) Tom Belsø			Ret	DNQ			8			DNQ						0
—	(Liechtenstein) Rikky von Opel	DNS			Ret	Ret	DNQ	9	9	DNQ							0
—	(France) Henri Pescarolo	9	14	18	12	Ret	Ret	Ret	Ret	Ret	Ret	10		Ret			0
—	(New Zealand) Chris Amon				Ret		DNS					DNQ		DNQ	NC	9	0
—	(Austria) Dieter Quester												9				0
—	(Australia) Tim Schenken				14	10	Ret		DNQ		Ret	DNQ	10	Ret		DSQ	0
—	(Austria) Helmut Koinigg												DNQ		10	Ret	0
—	(West Germany) Rolf Stommelen												Ret	Ret	11	12	0
—	(United Kingdom) Derek Bell										DNQ	11	DNQ	DNQ	DNQ		0
—	(United States) Mark Donohue														12	Ret	0
—	(South Africa) Ian Scheckter			13									DNQ				0
—	(France) François Migault	Ret	16	15	Ret	16	Ret		Ret	14	NC	DNQ		Ret			0
—	(United Kingdom) Ian Ashley											14	NC		DNQ	DNQ	0
—	(Netherlands) Gijs van Lennep					14			DNQ								0
—	(South Africa) Eddie Keizan			14													0
—	(United Kingdom) Richard Robarts	Ret	15	17				DNS									0
—	(Australia) Vern Schuppan					15	Ret	DSQ	DSQ	DNQ	DNQ	Ret					0
—	(France) Jacques Laffite											Ret	NC	Ret	15	Ret	0
—	(Belgium) Teddy Pilette					17											0
—	(South Africa) Dave Charlton			19													0
—	(United States) Peter Revson	Ret	Ret														0
—	(Finland) Leo Kinnunen					DNQ		Ret		DNQ	DNQ		DNQ	DNQ			0
—	(United Kingdom) Mike Wilds										DNQ		DNQ	DNQ	DNQ	NC	0
—	(France) Gérard Larrousse					Ret				DNQ							0
—	(South Africa) Paddy Driver			Ret													0
—	(Sweden) Reine Wisell							Ret									0
—	(Sweden) Bertil Roos							Ret									0
—	(United Kingdom) Peter Gethin										Ret						0
—	(Canada) Eppie Wietzes														Ret		0
—	(France) José Dolhem									DNQ				DNQ		Ret	0
—	(France) Jean-Pierre Jabouille									DNQ			DNQ				0
—	(United Kingdom) David Purley										DNQ						0
—	(Italy) Lella Lombardi										DNQ						0
—	(New Zealand) John Nicholson										DNQ						0
—	(Australia) Larry Perkins											DNQ					0
—	(Italy) Carlo Facetti													DNQ			0
Pos	Driver	ARG (Argentina)	BRA (Brazil)	RSA (South Africa)	ESP (Spain)	BEL (Belgium)	MON (Monaco)	SWE (Sweden)	NED (Netherlands)	FRA (France)	GBR (United Kingdom)	GER (West Germany)	AUT (Austria)	ITA (Italy)	CAN (Canada)	USA (United States)	Pts

Key
Colour	Result
Gold	Winner
Silver	Second place
Bronze	Third place
Green	Other points position
Blue	Other classified position
Blue	Not classified, finished (NC)
Purple	Not classified, retired (Ret)
Red	Did not qualify (DNQ)
Black	Disqualified (DSQ)
White	Did not start (DNS)
White	Race cancelled (C)
Blank	Did not practice (DNP)
Blank	Excluded (EX)
Blank	Did not arrive (DNA)
Blank	Withdrawn (WD)
Blank	Did not enter (empty cell)
Annotation	Meaning
P	Pole position
F	Fastest lap

The FIA did not award a championship classification to drivers who did not score championship points and did not apply a classification tiebreaker system to drivers gaining an equal number of championship points.

=== International Cup for F1 Manufacturers standings ===
Pos	Manufacturer	ARG (Argentina)	BRA (Brazil)	RSA (South Africa)	ESP (Spain)	BEL (Belgium)	MON (Monaco)	SWE (Sweden)	NED (Netherlands)	FRA (France)	GBR (United Kingdom)	GER (West Germany)	AUT (Austria)	ITA (Italy)	CAN (Canada)	USA (United States)	Pts
1	(United Kingdom) McLaren-Ford	**1**	**1**	**3**	**3**	**1**	(5)	**4**	**3**	**6**	**2**	15	**2**	**2**	**1**	**4**	73 (75)
2	(Italy) Ferrari	**2**	**2**	16	**1**	**2**	**4**	Ret	**1**	**2**	**4**	**1**	**5**	Ret	**2**	11	65
3	(United Kingdom) Tyrrell-Ford	**6**	8	**4**	**5**	**3**	**2**	**1**	**5**	**4**	**1**	**2**	Ret	**3**	**5**	**6**	52
4	(United Kingdom) Lotus-Ford	13	**3**	13	Ret	Ret	**1**	Ret	8	**1**	**3**	**4**	Ret	**1**	**3**	Ret	42
5	(United Kingdom) Brabham-Ford	7	7	**1**	11	11	**6**	9	7	16	**6**	**3**	**1**	**5**	8	**1**	35
6	(United Kingdom) Hesketh-Ford			Ret	10	Ret	Ret	**3**	Ret	Ret	Ret	Ret	**3**	Ret	**4**	**3**	15
7	(United Kingdom) BRM	**5**	10	**2**	12	**5**	Ret	Ret	Ret	10	12	10	Ret	Ret	NC	9	10
8	(United States) Shadow-Ford	Ret	Ret	WD	7	13	**3**	**5**	Ret	12	8	**6**	8	10	Ret	10	7
9	(United Kingdom) March-Ford	8	9	**5**	**4**	9	Ret	10	10	11	Ret	7	**6**	Ret	Ret	Ret	6
10	(United Kingdom) Iso-Marlboro-Ford	Ret	Ret	**6**	Ret	14	Ret	8	Ret	9	Ret	Ret	NC	**4**	15	Ret	4
11	(United Kingdom) Surtees-Ford	Ret	**4**	11	13	Ret	Ret	Ret	Ret	Ret	14	11	9	DNQ	10	Ret	3
12	(United Kingdom) Lola-Ford	11	11	12	Ret	8	7	**6**	Ret	13	13	9	12	8	11	8	1
—	(United States) Parnelli-Ford														7	DSQ	0
—	(United Kingdom) Trojan-Ford				14	10	Ret		DNQ		Ret	DNQ	10	Ret			0
—	(United States) Penske-Ford														12	Ret	0
—	(United Kingdom) Token-Ford					Ret				WD	DNQ	14	NC				0
—	(United Kingdom) Ensign-Ford	DNS	WD	WD		15	Ret	DSQ	DSQ	DNQ	DNQ	Ret	DNQ	DNQ	DNQ	NC	0
—	(New Zealand) Amon-Ford				Ret	WD	DNS	WD				DNQ		DNQ			0
—	(Japan) Maki-Ford						WD				DNQ	DNQ					0
—	(United Kingdom) Lyncar-Ford					WD					DNQ						0
Pos	Constructor	ARG (Argentina)	BRA (Brazil)	RSA (South Africa)	ESP (Spain)	BEL (Belgium)	MON (Monaco)	SWE (Sweden)	NED (Netherlands)	FRA (France)	GBR (United Kingdom)	GER (West Germany)	AUT (Austria)	ITA (Italy)	CAN (Canada)	USA (United States)	Pts

Race results shown in Bold in the above table indicate that points were awarded and retained. Race results shown within brackets indicate that points were awarded but not retained.

The FIA did not award a championship classification to a manufacturer that did not score championship points.

== Non-championship races ==
The following races were open to Formula One cars, but did not count towards the World Championship of F1 Drivers or the International Cup for F1 Manufacturers.

Race name	Circuit	Date	Winning driver	Constructor	Report
(Brazil) I Presidente Medici Grand Prix	Brasília	3 February	(Brazil) Emerson Fittipaldi	(United Kingdom) McLaren-Cosworth	Report
(United Kingdom) IX Race of Champions	Brands Hatch	17 March	(Belgium) Jacky Ickx	(United Kingdom) Lotus-Cosworth	Report
(United Kingdom) XXVI BRDC International Trophy	Silverstone	7 April	(United Kingdom) James Hunt	(United Kingdom) Hesketh-Cosworth	Report
