= 1974 Monaco Grand Prix =

Coordinates: 43°44′4.74″N 7°25′16.8″E

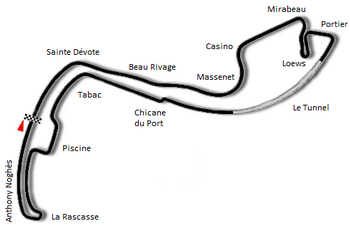
- Circuit de Monaco

Race details
- Date: 26 May 1974
- Official name: XXXII Grand Prix de Monaco
- Location: Monte Carlo, Monaco
- Course: Street Circuit
- Course length: 3.278 km (2.037 miles)
- Distance: 78 laps, 255.684 km (158.886 miles)

Pole position
Driver	(Austria) Niki Lauda	Ferrari
- Time: 1:26.3

Fastest lap
Driver	(Sweden) Ronnie Peterson	Lotus-Ford
- Time: 1:27.9 on lap 57 (lap record)

Podium
First	(Sweden) Ronnie Peterson	Lotus-Ford
Second	(South Africa) Jody Scheckter	Tyrrell-Ford
Third	(France) Jean-Pierre Jarier	Shadow-Ford

The 1974 Monaco Grand Prix was a Formula One motor race held at Monaco on 26 May 1974. It was race 6 of 15 in both the 1974 World Championship of Drivers and the 1974 International Cup for Formula One Manufacturers. The 78-lap race was won by Lotus driver Ronnie Peterson after he started from third position. Jody Scheckter finished second for the Tyrrell team and Shadow driver Jean-Pierre Jarier came in third.

== Qualifying ==
=== Qualifying classification ===
Pos.	Driver	Constructor	Time	No
1	Niki Lauda	Ferrari	1:26.3	1
2	Clay Regazzoni	Ferrari	1:26.6	2
3	Ronnie Peterson	Lotus-Ford	1:26.8	3
4	Patrick Depailler	Tyrrell-Ford	1:27.1	4
5	Jody Scheckter	Tyrrell-Ford	1:27.1	5
6	Jean-Pierre Jarier	Shadow-Ford	1:27.5	6
7	James Hunt	Hesketh-Ford	1:27.8	7
8	Carlos Reutemann	Brabham-Ford	1:27.8	8
9	Hans-Joachim Stuck	March-Ford	1:28.0	9
10	Mike Hailwood	McLaren-Ford	1:28.1	10
11	Jean-Pierre Beltoise	BRM	1:28.1	11
12	Denis Hulme	McLaren-Ford	1:28.2	12
13	Emerson Fittipaldi	McLaren-Ford	1:28.2	13
14	Arturo Merzario	Iso-Ford	1:28.5	14
15	Vittorio Brambilla	March-Ford	1:28.7	15
16	Brian Redman	Shadow-Ford	1:28.8	16
17	Jochen Mass	Surtees-Ford	1:28.8	DNS
18	Carlos Pace	Surtees-Ford	1:29.1	17
19	Jacky Ickx	Lotus-Ford	1:29.4	18
20	Chris Amon	Amon-Ford	1:29.8	DNS
21	Graham Hill	Lola-Ford	1:30.0	19
22	François Migault	BRM	1:30.0	20
23	John Watson	Brabham-Ford	1:30.0	21
24	Tim Schenken	Trojan-Ford	1:30.2	22
25	Vern Schuppan	Ensign-Ford	1:30.3	23
26	Guy Edwards	Lola-Ford	1:30.4	24
27	Henri Pescarolo	BRM	1:30.7	25
DNQ	Rikky von Opel	Brabham-Ford	1:31.1	—

== Race ==
=== Classification ===
Pos	No	Driver	Constructor	Laps	Time/Retired	Grid	Points
1	1	(Sweden) Ronnie Peterson	Lotus-Ford	78	1:58:03.7	3	9
2	3	(South Africa) Jody Scheckter	Tyrrell-Ford	78	+ 28.8	5	6
3	17	(France) Jean-Pierre Jarier	Shadow-Ford	78	+ 48.9	6	4
4	11	(Switzerland) Clay Regazzoni	Ferrari	78	+ 1:03.1	2	3
5	5	(Brazil) Emerson Fittipaldi	McLaren-Ford	77	+ 1 Lap	13	2
6	28	(United Kingdom) John Watson	Brabham-Ford	77	+ 1 Lap	23	1
7	26	(United Kingdom) Graham Hill	Lola-Ford	76	+ 2 Laps	21	
8	27	(United Kingdom) Guy Edwards	Lola-Ford	75	+ 3 Laps	26	
9	4	(France) Patrick Depailler	Tyrrell-Ford	74	+ 4 laps	4	
Ret	15	(France) Henri Pescarolo	BRM	62	Gearbox	27	
Ret	2	(Belgium) Jacky Ickx	Lotus-Ford	34	Engine	19	
Ret	12	(Austria) Niki Lauda	Ferrari	32	Ignition	1	
Ret	24	(United Kingdom) James Hunt	Hesketh-Ford	27	Halfshaft	7	
Ret	33	(United Kingdom) Mike Hailwood	McLaren-Ford	11	Accident	10	
Ret	7	(Argentina) Carlos Reutemann	Brabham-Ford	5	Suspension	8	
Ret	37	(France) François Migault	BRM	4	Accident	22	
Ret	22	(Australia) Vern Schuppan	Ensign-Ford	4	Accident	25	
Ret	9	(Germany) Hans Joachim Stuck	March-Ford	3	Collision	9	
Ret	14	(France) Jean-Pierre Beltoise	BRM	0	Collision	11	
Ret	6	(New Zealand) Denny Hulme	McLaren-Ford	0	Collision	12	
Ret	20	(Italy) Arturo Merzario	Iso-Marlboro-Ford	0	Collision	14	
Ret	10	(Italy) Vittorio Brambilla	March-Ford	0	Collision	15	
Ret	16	(United Kingdom) Brian Redman	Shadow-Ford	0	Collision	16	
Ret	18	(Brazil) Carlos Pace	Surtees-Ford	0	Collision	18	
Ret	23	(Australia) Tim Schenken	Trojan-Ford	0	Collision	24	
DNS	19	(Germany) Jochen Mass	Surtees-Ford			17	
DNS	30	(New Zealand) Chris Amon	Amon-Ford		Brakes	20	
DNQ	8	(Liechtenstein) Rikky von Opel	Brabham-Ford				

== Notes ==
- This was the 5th podium finish for a South African driver.
- This was the 6th win of a Monaco Grand Prix by Lotus, breaking the previous record set by BRM at the 1972 Monaco Grand Prix.
- This was the 61st fastest lap set by a Ford-powered car, breaking the previous record set by Ferrari at the 1974 Spanish Grand Prix, earlier that year.

== Championship standings after the race ==
Drivers' Championship standings

	Pos	Driver	Points
	1	(Brazil) Emerson Fittipaldi	24
1	2	(Switzerland) Clay Regazzoni	22
1	3	(Austria) Niki Lauda	21
4	4	(South Africa) Jody Scheckter	12
1	5	(New Zealand) Denny Hulme	11

Constructors' Championship standings

	Pos	Constructor	Points
	1	(United Kingdom) McLaren-Ford	37
	2	(Italy) Ferrari	30
1	3	(United Kingdom) Tyrrell-Ford	16
3	4	(United Kingdom) Lotus-Ford	13
	5	(United Kingdom) Brabham-Ford	10

- Note: Only the top five positions are included for both sets of standings.

Previous race: 1974 Belgian Grand Prix	FIA Formula One World Championship; 1974 season	Next race: 1974 Swedish Grand Prix
Previous race: 1973 Monaco Grand Prix	Monaco Grand Prix	Next race: 1975 Monaco Grand Prix
