= Laine =

Origin
- Meaning: "wave", from Estonian laine and Finnish laine
- Region of origin: Estonia, Finland

Laine is Finnish and Estonian for "wave", and a surname in various languages. Laine is a Laine type Finnish surname. In Estonian, it is also a female given name.

== Given name ==
On 1 January 2022, in Estonia, 1,709 women had the first name Laine, making it the 98th most popular female name in the country. The first name Laine was most common in Jõgeva County, where 28.31 per 10,000 inhabitants of the county bear the name.

Notable people bearing the given name Laine include:

- Laine Erik (1942–2024), Estonian agricultural scientist and middle-distance runner
- Janet-Laine Green (born 1951), Canadian actress, director, producer, and teacher
- Laine Hardy (born 2000), American singer-songwriter
- Laine Hone (1926–2005), Estonian translator and philologist
- Laine Johnson, Canadian politician
- Laine Mägi (born 1959), Estonian actress
- Laine Mesikäpp (1917–2012), Estonian actress, singer, folk song collector
- Laine Randjärv (born 1964), Estonian politician
- Laine Tarvis (1937–2024), Estonian politician
- Laine Villenthal (1922–2009), Estonian Lutheran cleric

== Surname ==
- Amanda Laine (born 1992), Canadian model
- Andrew Laine, American engineer
- Augusta Laine (1867–1949), Finnish economist and politician
- Betty Laine, English dance teacher and former professional dancer
- Carolyn Laine (born 1946), American politician
- Cherry Laine (born 1943), Jamaican-born singer
- Christine Laine, American physician
- Cleo Laine (1927–2025), English jazz and pop singer
- Denny Laine (1944–2023), English musician, singer, songwriter, and guitarist
- Doris Laine (1931–2018), Finnish ballet dancer
- Edvin Laine (1905–1989), Finnish film director
- Eero Laine, multiple people
- Ellie Laine, British comedian
- Emma Laine (born 1986), Finnish tennis player
- Ensio Laine (1927–2021), Finnish politician
- Erkki Laine (1957–2009), Finnish ice hockey player
- Esko Laine, Finnish musician
- Essi Laine (born 1984), Finnish tennis player
- Frankie Laine (1913–2007), American singer, songwriter, and actor
- Hans Laine (1945–1970), Finnish auto racer
- Helena Laine (born 1955), Finnish javelin thrower
- James Laine, American academic, Professor of Religious Studies
- Janne-Pekka Laine (born 2001), Finnish football player
- Jarkko Laine (1947–2006), Finnish poet and a writer
- Jo Jo Laine (1952–2006), American singer, model and actress
- Johannes Laine (1866–1933), Finnish educationist, school director and politician
- Jon Laine (born 1975), American hip hop producer and drummer
- Keenon Laine (born 1997), American track and field athlete
- Lari Laine (born Corrine Cole, 1937), American model and actress
- Lasse J. Laine (1946–2023), Finnish birdwatcher, biologist and author
- Lauri Laine (born 2005), Finnish footballer
- Liliana Laine (1923–1999), French film actress
- Marion Laine, French actor, screenwriter and film director
- Markku Laine (born 1955), Finnish middle-distance runner
- Mathieu Laine (born 1975), French entrepreneur and intellectual
- Matias Laine (born 1990), Finnish racing driver
- Maurice Laine (1895–1962), French racing cyclist
- Michelle Laine, American fashion and costume designer
- Mikko Laine (born 1976), Finnish professional ice hockey forward
- Murray De Laine (born 1936), Australian politician
- Nooa Laine (born 2002), Malaysian football player
- Olli-Pekka Laine (born 1973), Finnish musician
- Oskari Laine (1859–1933), Finnish farmer and politician
- Papa Jack Laine (1873–1966), American musician
- Patrik Laine (born 1998), Finnish ice hockey player
- Paul Laine, Canadian rock musician
- Pertti Laine (1938–1999), Finnish rower
- Randy Laine (born 1952), American surfer
- Sarah Laine (born 1982), American actress
- Sari Laine (born 1962), Finnish karateka
- Sinikka Laine (born 1945), Finnish author
- Skylar Laine (born 1994), American singer
- Teemu Laine (born 1982), Finnish ice hockey player
- Timo Laine (born 1934), Finnish former speedway longtrack and motorcycle speedway rider
- Tormis Laine (born 2000), Estonian alpine skier
- Vanessa Laine (Vanessa Bryant; born 1982), American businesswoman and philanthropist
- Vicci Laine (1960–2017), American transgender stage performer, singer, HIV/AIDS fundraiser, and activist
- Wilho Laine (1875–1918), Finnish carpenter and politician

== See also ==
- Lainé
- Liane
