= Liane =

Liane is a given name and a surname. Notable people with the name include:

== Given name ==
- Liane Augustin (1927–1978), German Austrian actress and singer
- Liane Bahler (1982–2007), German racing cyclist
- Liane Balaban (born 1980), Canadian actress
- Liane Berkowitz (1923–1943), German World War II resistance member
- Liane Bonin, American journalist, author and radio producer
- Liane Carroll (born 1964), English pianist/vocalist
- Liane Engeman (1944–2026), Dutch racing car driver
- Liane Gabora, Canadian academic and psychologist
- Liane Haid (1895–2000), Austrian actress
- Liane Hansen (born 1951), American National Public Radio host
- Liane Michaelis (born 1953), East German handball player
- Liane de Pougy (1869–1950), French dancer and courtesan
- Liane Marcia Rossi, Brazilian chemist
- Liane Tooth (born 1962), Australian field hockey player

== Surname ==
- Eigil Olaf Liane (1916–1994), Norwegian politician

== Fictional characters ==
- Liane Cartman, Eric Cartman's mother on South Park

== See also ==
- Lianne
- Liana (disambiguation)
- Laine
