= Arctic Rally =

Finland rally competition

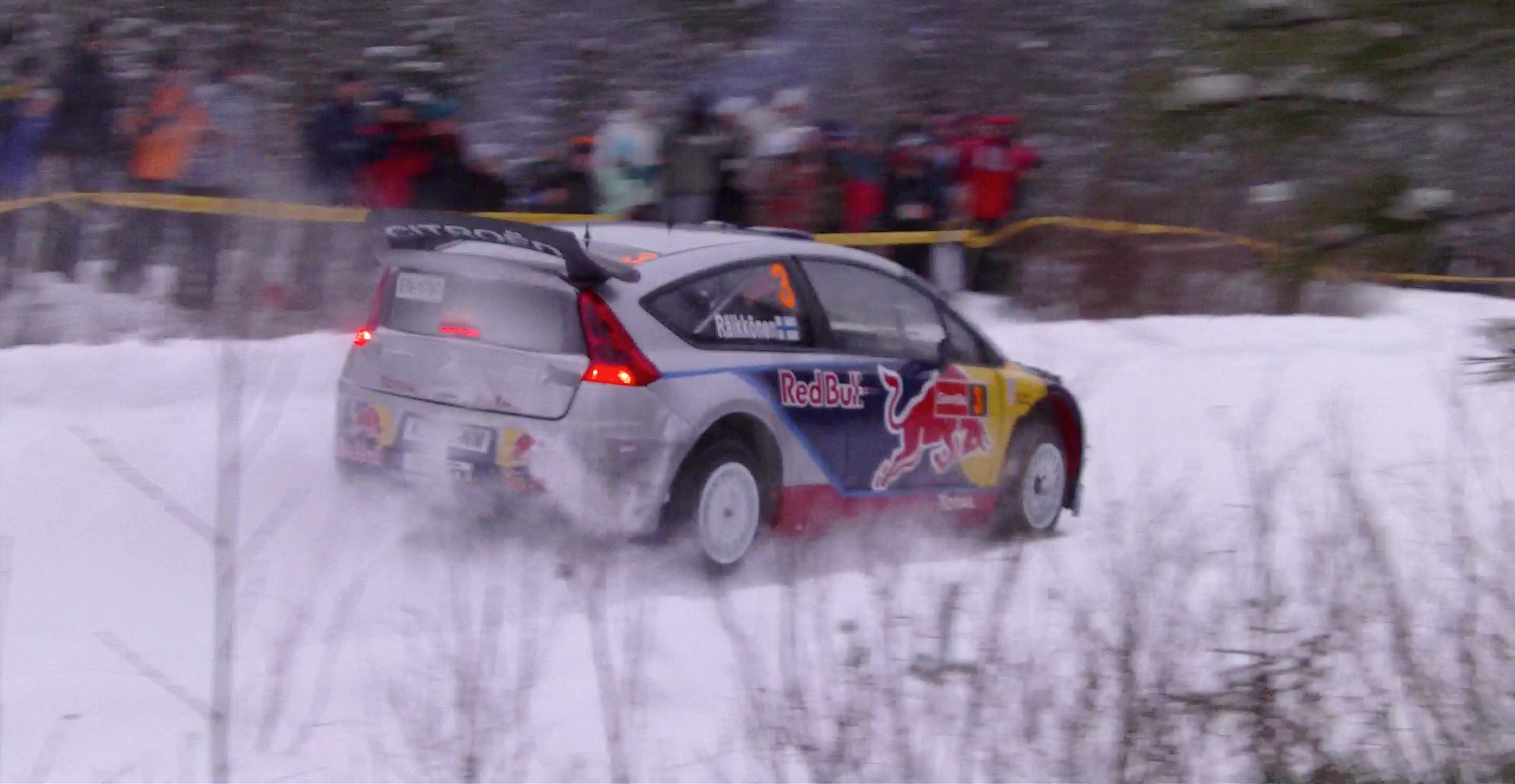
Kimi Räikkönen driving Citroën C4 WRC at the 2010 event

Arctic Rally, currently Arctic Lapland Rally and also known as Tunturiralli, is an annual rally competition held on ice- and snow-covered roads in Rovaniemi, Lapland, Finland. It has been organized continuously since 1966. In 2021, a separate event based on the rally became part of the World Rally Championship as Arctic Rally Finland. The rally is also part of the Finnish Rally Championship and has previously been a round of the European Rally Championship until 2003 and the FIA Cup for Rally Drivers in 1977 and 1978.

In 2021 the rally was held twice, once between 14 and 16 January for the Finnish Rally Championship, and again between 26 and 28 February for the World Rally Championship, as a replacement for the canceled Rally Sweden.

The rally has been won by seven World Rally Champions: Marcus Grönholm, Tommi Mäkinen, Hannu Mikkola, Timo Salonen, Ari Vatanen, Ott Tänak, and Kalle Rovanperä. In recent years, it has attracted competitors from circuit racing. The 2009 entry list included four current or former Formula One drivers; JJ Lehto finished ninth on his tenth Arctic Rally, Kimi Räikkönen 13th on his first-ever rally competition, Mika Häkkinen 19th on his fourth outing in the event while a gearbox failure ended Mika Salo's third Arctic Rally. Most recently, Valtteri Bottas finished fifth overall in 2019, ninth in 2020 and sixth in January 2021. In 2020, Kalle Rovanperä won his first ever event driving a World Rally Car, the Toyota Yaris WRC. Juho Hänninen won the January 2021 event.

== Winners ==
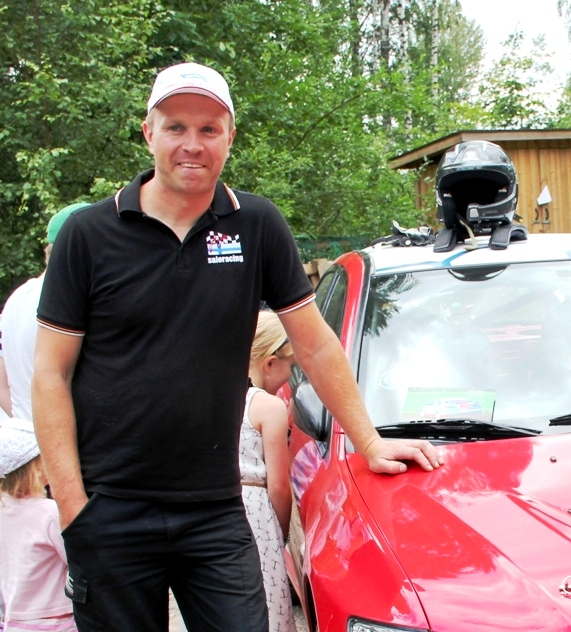
With six wins Juha Salo has the most victories in Arctic Rally

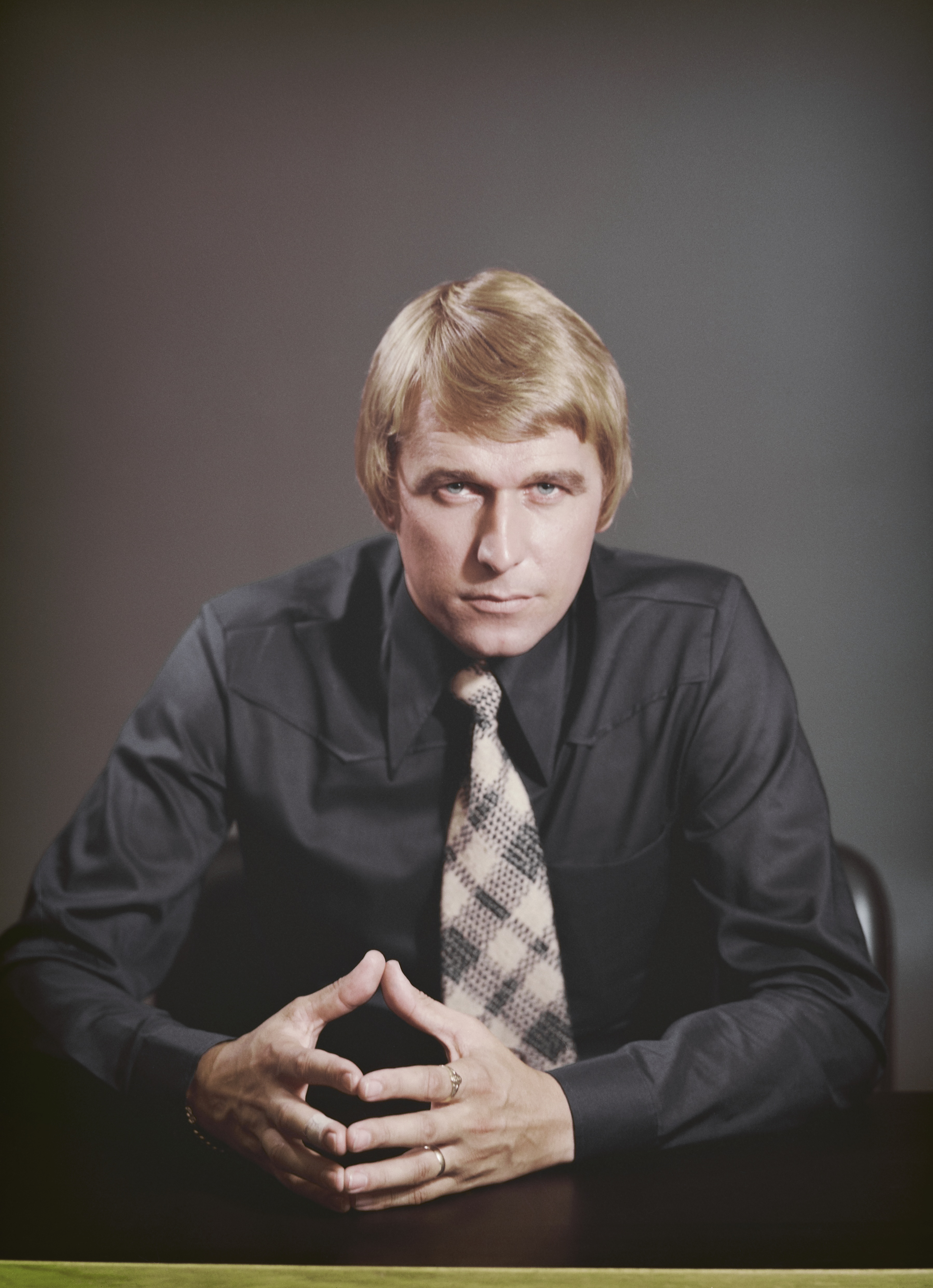
Kari O. Sohlberg was the first Arctic Rally winner

Year	Driver	Car	Championship
2025	(Finland) Tuukka Kauppinen	(Japan) Toyota GR Yaris Rally2	Finland
2024	(United Kingdom) Elfyn Evans	(Japan) Toyota GR Yaris Rally1	Finland
2023	(Finland) Teemu Asunmaa	(Czech Republic) Skoda Fabia R5 EVO	Finland
2022	(Finland) Emil Lindholm	(Czech Republic) Skoda Fabia R5 EVO	Finland
2021 (Feb)	(Estonia) Ott Tänak	(South Korea) Hyundai i20 Coupe WRC	WRC
2021 (Jan)	(Finland) Juho Hänninen	(Japan) Toyota Yaris WRC	Finland
2020	(Finland) Kalle Rovanperä	(Japan) Toyota Yaris WRC	Finland
2019	(Finland) Emil Lindholm	(Germany) Volkswagen Polo GTI R5	Finland
2018	(Finland) Eerik Pietarinen	(Czech Republic) Škoda Fabia R5	Finland
2017	(Finland) Teemu Asunmaa	(Czech Republic) Škoda Fabia R5	Finland
2016	(Finland) Juha Salo	(France) Peugeot 208 T16	Finland
2015	(Finland) Juha Salo	(Japan) Mitsubishi Lancer Evolution IX	Finland
2014	(Finland) Janne Tuohino	(United States) Ford Fiesta R5	Finland
2013	(Finland) Juha Salo	(Japan) Mitsubishi Lancer Evolution X	Finland
2012	(Finland) Esapekka Lappi	(United States) Ford Fiesta S2000	Finland
2011	(Finland) Juha Salo	(Japan) Mitsubishi Lancer Evolution X	Finland
2010	(Spain) Dani Sordo	(France) Citroën C4 WRC	Finland
2009	(Finland) Juha Salo	(Japan) Mitsubishi Lancer Evolution IX	Finland
2008	(Finland) Juha Salo	(Japan) Mitsubishi Lancer Evolution IX	Finland
2007	(Finland) Kosti Katajamäki	(Japan) Mitsubishi Lancer Evolution IX	Finland
2006	(Finland) Kosti Katajamäki	(United States) Ford Focus RS WRC	Finland
2005	(Finland) Juuso Pykälistö	(United States) Ford Focus RS WRC	Finland
2004	(Finland) Jukka Ketomäki	(Japan) Mitsubishi Lancer Evolution VII	ERC N
2003	(Finland) Janne Tuohino	(United States) Ford Focus RS WRC	ERC
2002	(Finland) Juuso Pykälistö	(Japan) Toyota Corolla WRC	ERC
2001	(Finland) Pasi Hagström	(Japan) Toyota Corolla WRC	ERC
2000	(Sweden) Thomas Rådström	(Japan) Toyota Corolla WRC	ERC
1999	(Finland) Pasi Hagström	(Japan) Toyota Corolla WRC	ERC
1998	(Finland) Marcus Grönholm	(Japan) Toyota Celica GT-Four ST205	ERC
1997	(Finland) Marcus Grönholm	(Japan) Toyota Celica GT-Four ST205	ERC
1996	(Finland) Marcus Grönholm	(Japan) Toyota Celica Turbo 4WD	ERC
1995	(Finland) Sebastian Lindholm	(United States) Ford Escort RS Cosworth	ERC
1994	(Finland) Lasse Lampi	(Japan) Mitsubishi Galant VR-4	ERC
1993	(Finland) Mikael Sundström	(Japan) Mazda 323 4WD	ERC
1992	(Finland) Kari Kivenne	(Japan) Mitsubishi Galant VR-4	ERC
1991	(Finland) Mikael Sundström	(Japan) Mazda 323 4WD	ERC
1990	(Finland) Antero Laine	(Italy) Lancia Delta Integrale	ERC
1989	(Finland) Tommi Mäkinen	(Italy) Lancia Delta Integrale	ERC
1988	(Finland) Timo Heinonen	(Germany) Audi Coupé Quattro	ERC
1987	(Finland) Mikael Sundström	(Japan) Mazda 323 4WD	ERC
1986	(Finland) Antero Laine	(Germany) Audi Quattro	ERC
1985	(Finland) Antero Laine	(Germany) Audi Quattro	ERC
1984	(Finland) Antero Laine	(Germany) Audi Quattro	ERC
1983	(Finland) Lasse Lampi	(Germany) Audi Quattro	ERC
1982	(Finland) Timo Salonen	(Japan) Datsun Violet GT	ERC
1981	(Finland) Ulf Grönholm	(Italy) Fiat 131 Abarth	ERC
1980	(Finland) Henri Toivonen	(United Kingdom) Talbot Sunbeam Lotus	ERC
1979	(Finland) Leo Kinnunen	(Germany) Porsche 911 S	ERC
1978	(Finland) Ari Vatanen	(United States) Ford Escort RS1800	FIA Cup, ERC
1977	(Finland) Ari Vatanen	(United States) Ford Escort RS1800	FIA Cup, ERC
1976	(Finland) Tapio Rainio	(Sweden) Saab 96 V4	ERC
1975	(Finland) Simo Lampinen	(Sweden) Saab 96 V4	ERC
1974	(Finland) Tapio Rainio	(Sweden) Saab 96 V4	ERC
1973	(Finland) Timo Mäkinen	(United States) Ford Escort RS1600	ERC
1972	(Finland) Leo Kinnunen	(Germany) Porsche 911 S	ERC
1971	(Finland) Antti Aarnio-Wihuri	(Germany) Porsche 911 S	
1970	(Finland) Hannu Mikkola	(United States) Ford Escort Twin-Cam	Finland
1969	(Finland) Antti Aarnio-Wihuri	(Germany) Porsche 911 S	
1968	(Finland) Hans Laine	(Germany) Volkswagen VW 1600 L	Finland
1967	(Finland) Raimo Kossila	(Germany) Volkswagen VW 1600 L	
1966	(Finland) Kari O. Sohlberg	(Germany) Volkswagen VW 1600 L	

=== Wins by manufacturer ===
Wins	Manufacturers
11	(Japan) Toyota
10	(United States) Ford
9	(Japan) Mitsubishi
5	(Germany) Audi
4	(Germany) Porsche (Germany) Volkswagen (Czech Republic) Škoda
3	(Japan) Mazda (Sweden) Saab
2	(Italy) Lancia
1	(South Korea) Hyundai (France) Citroën (Japan) Datsun (Italy) Fiat (France) Peugeot (United Kingdom) Talbot
