= Uuno Brander =

Finnish politician

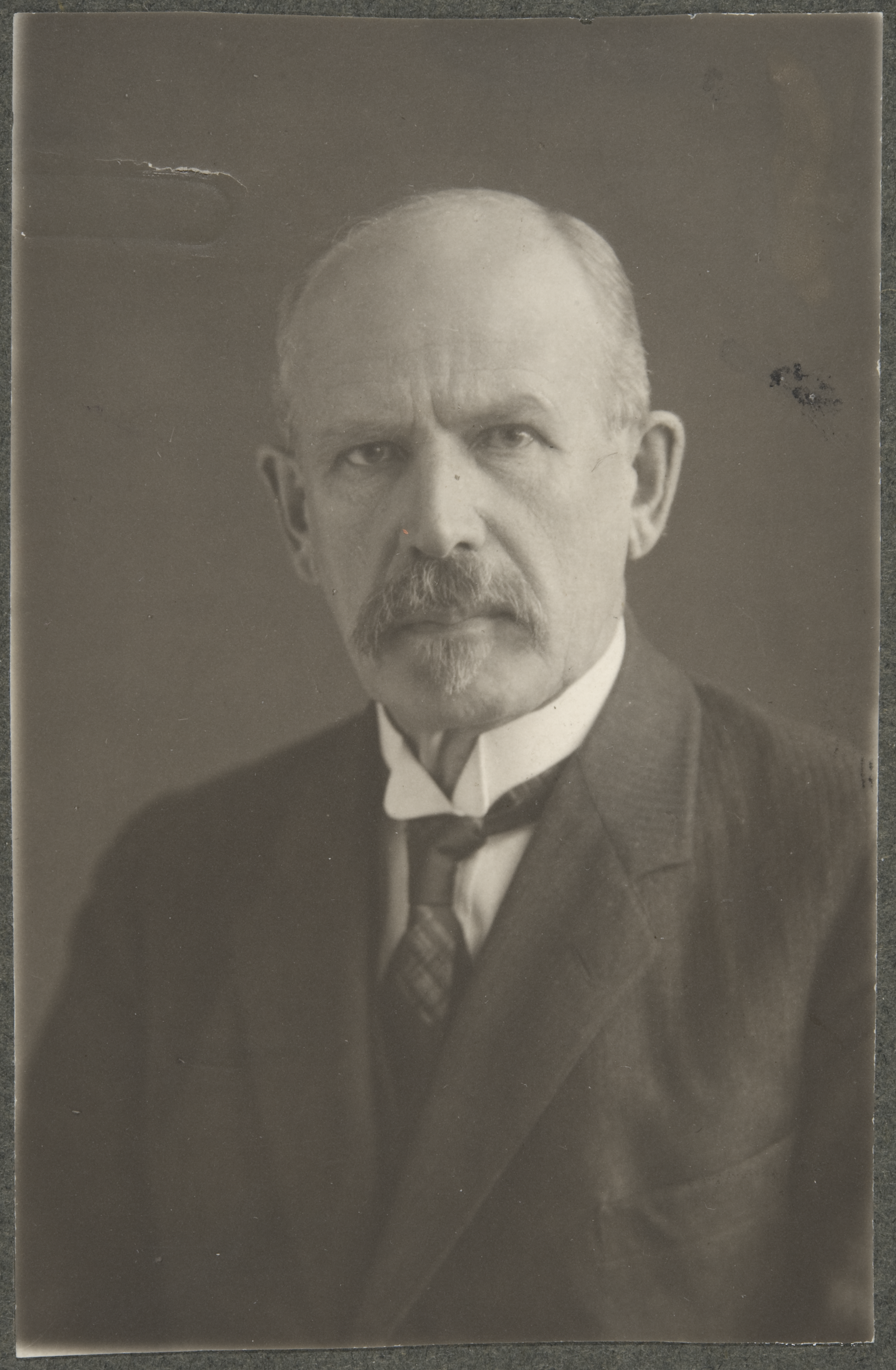
Uuno Brander

Uuno Edvard Brander (23 July 1870 - 13 July 1934) was a Finnish agronomist, civil servant, farmer and politician, born in Kitee. He served as Minister of Agriculture from 27 November 1918 to 17 April 1919 and as Deputy Minister of Agriculture from 22 December 1928 to 18 August 1929. He was a member of the Parliament of Finland, representing the Young Finnish Party from 1907 to 1910 and from 1911 to 1917 and the National Progressive Party from 1924 to 1927 and from 1930 to 1933. He was the younger brother of Augusta Laine and the elder brother of Helena and Akseli Brander. Johannes Laine was his brother-in-law.
