= Hans Laine =

Finnish auto racer (1945–1970)

- Born: 25 April 1945 Helsinki, Finland
- Died: 30 May 1970 (aged 25) Adenau, West Germany

Hans Laine (25 April 1945 – 30 May 1970) was a Finnish auto racer. He died during training sessions at the Nürburgring.

== Life and career ==
Laine followed in the footsteps of his father, Holger Laine, who played a significant role in organizing the Eläintarhan ajot motor racing competition in Helsinki. Holger worked as a car dealer in Ruskeasuo, Helsinki, and his passion for motorsports had a profound impact on Hans's career as an athlete.

Laine's racing career took off as a rally driver. He made a name for himself on the international stage when he and his uncle Henry participated in the Acropolis Rally in 1967, where he achieved an impressive seventh-place ranking. In the 1969 Jyväskylä Grand Rally, he held the lead position, with Hannu Mikkola in second place, before being forced to retire due to gearbox issues. That same year, Laine ventured into sports car racing for the first time, competing at the Nürburgring with a Porsche 906 alongside Sten Axelsson from Sweden.

In 1970, Laine joined the AAW racing team, which was owned by Antti Aarnio-Wihuri. The team acquired a Porsche 908/02 sports car, and Laine's partner for the season was Gijs van Lennep from the Netherlands. They enjoyed early success at the BOAC 500 in Brands Hatch, UK, triumphing under challenging conditions. Their fruitful season continued with a fourth-place finish in the Italian Targa Florio, where they were driving the Porsche 908.

The AAW team entered two cars for the Nürburgring ADAC 1000 km race: a Porsche 917, driven by Pauli Toivonen and Sten Axelsson, and a Porsche 908/02 driven by Laine and Gijs van Lennep. During the qualifying session, Laine and van Lennep achieved a time of 8 minutes and 14 seconds, which would have secured them the eighth starting position. However, tragedy struck during free practice on the Dottinger Höhe straight. Laine's car experienced a loss of downforce when it hit a bump, causing it to crash and catch fire. Despite the rescue efforts of responders and fellow competitors, the fire could not be extinguished in time, and Laine succumbed to his injuries.

Laine had become a favorite of the people and his death was a shock to the public as well as to his rivals. Laine's funeral was held at Espoo Cathedral. His coffin was carried by Holger and Henry Laine, and, among others, Timo Mäkinen, Hannu Mikkola and Gijs van Lennep.

== Racing results in track competitions ==
Date	Race	Car	Driver/drivers	Team	Position
5 June 1966	Artukainen [Specials]	Plymouth Valiant	Laine		raced
11 September 1966	Artukainen [Specials]	Volvo PV544	Laine		raced
23 April 1967	Artukainen [Specials]	Alfa Romeo GTA	Laine		DNF
1 June 1969	1000 km Nürburgring	Porsche 906	Sten Axelsson / Laine	Sten Axelsson Road Racing	13.
24 August 1969	Nordic Challenge Keimola	Porsche 906	Laine		3.
7 September 1969	GP Finland	Porsche 906	Laine		2.
12 October 1969	1000 km Paris	Porsche 908/02	Laine / Gérard Larrousse	AAW Racing Team	DNF
11 January 1970	1000 km Buenos Aires	Porsche 908/02	Laine / Gijs van Lennep	Racing Team AAW	9.
18 January 1970	200 mile Buenos Aires	Porsche 908/02	Laine / van Lennep	Racing Team AAW	7.
1 February 1970	24 h Daytona	Porsche 908/02	Laine / van Lennep	AAW Racing Team	DNF
21 March 1970	12 h Sebring	Porsche 908/02	Laine / van Lennep	AAW Racing Team	DNF
12 April 1970	1000 km Brands Hatch	Porsche 908/02	van Lennep / Laine	AAW Racing Team	4.
25 April 1970	1000 km Monza	Porsche 917	Laine / van Lennep	AAW Racing Team	11.
3 May 1970	Targa Florio	Porsche 917	van Lennep / Laine	AAW Racing Team	DNA
3 May 1970	Targa Florio	Porsche 908/02	van Lennep / Laine	AAW Racing Team	4.
17 May 1970	1000 km Spa	Porsche 917	Laine / van Lennep	AAW Racing Team	7.
31 May 1970	1000 km Nürburgring	Porsche 908/02	van Lennep / Laine	AAW Racing Team	DNS
31 May 1970	1000 km Nürburgring	Porsche 917	In entry list only	AAW Racing Team	DNS

== Racing results in rally competitions ==
Date	Race	Co-driver	Car	Position
13–14 November 1965	Helsinki Rally	Hagström, Reijo	Volvo PV544	13.
5–6 January 1966	Riihimäki-Rally	Laine, Henry	Volvo PV544	6.
25–27 February 1966	Hankiralli	Laine, Henry	Volvo PV544	12.
14–15 May 1966	Salpausselkä Rally	Laine, Henry	Volvo PV544	2.
9–10 July 1966	Itäralli	Laine, Henry	Volvo PV544	7.
19–21 August 1966	Jyväskylä Grand Rally	Laine, Henry	Volvo PV544	DNF
5–6 January 1967	Riihimäki-Rally	Laine, Henry	Datsun 1600	23.
24–26 February 1967	Hankiralli	Laine, Henry	Datsun 1600	DNF
25–28 May 1967	Acropolis Rally	Järvi, Anssi	Datsun 1600 SSS	7.
18–20 August 1967	Jyväskylä Grand Rally	Laine, Henry	Volkswagen 1600 L	20.
9–10 September 1967	Tampere Rally	Laine, Henry	Volkswagen 1600 L	7.
11–12 November 1967	Helsinki Rally	Laine, Henry	Volkswagen 1600 L	5.
20–25 January 1968	Monte Carlo Rally	Keskitalo, Pekka	Porsche 911 S	DNF
23–25 February 1968	Hankiralli	Laine, Henry	Volkswagen 1600 L	4.
9–10 March 1968	Arctic Lapland Rally	Laine, Henry	Volkswagen 1600 L	1.
25–26 May 1968	Salpausselkä Rally	Laine, Henry	Volkswagen 1600 L	DNF
5–7 July 1968	Itäralli	Laine, Henry	Volkswagen 1600 L	11.
16–18 August 1968	Jyväskylä Grand Rally	Kolari (First name unknown)	Porsche 911 S	DNF
25–27 October 1968	Northern Rally	Laine, Henry	Volkswagen 1600 L	DNF
4–5 January 1969	Riihimäki-Rally	Laine, Henry	Volkswagen 1600 L	3.
17–24 January 1973	Monte Carlo Rally	Aho, Atso	Porsche 911 L	DNF
21–23 February 1969	Hankiralli	Laine, Henry	Volkswagen 1600 L	5.
14–15 May 1969	West-Coast Rally	Laine, Henry	Volkswagen 1600 L	6.
15–17 August 1969	Jyväskylä Grand Rally	Laine, Henry	Porsche 911 S	DNF
30–31 August 1969	Tott-Porrassalmi Rally	Laine, Henry	Porsche 911 S	1.
28–30 November 1969	Northern Rally	Laine, Henry	Porsche 911 S	DNF
6–8 February 1970	Arctic Lapland Rally	Laine, Henry	Volkswagen 1500	DNF
20–22 February 1970	Hankiralli	Laine, Henry	Volkswagen 1500	9.
7–8 March 1970	Teekkariralli	Laine, Henry	Volkswagen 1500	DNF
