= Akseli Brander =

Finnish politician (1876–1958)

Aksel (Akseli) Vilhelm Brander (18 April 1876 – 3 October 1958) was a Finnish agronomist, educationist, farmer and politician. He was a member of the Parliament of Finland from 1933 to 1951, representing the Agrarian League. He was born in Kitee, and was the younger brother of Augusta Laine and of Uuno and Helena Brander.
