= Lianne =

Lianne is a female given name, sometimes short for Juliana, (and can therefore mean youthful or dedicated to Jupiter) or a combination of Lia and Anna. The name "Lianne" is also French for "climbing vine". It may refer to:

- Lianne Dalziel (born 1960), New Zealand politician;
- Lianne Hall, English folk/electronic singer
- Lianne La Havas (born 1989), English singer and songwriter;
- Lianne Mars, fictional character from television series Veronica Mars;
- Lianne Sanderson (born 1988), English women's footballer;
- Lianne Sheppard, American statistician (short for Elizabeth Anne)
- Lianne Shirley (born 1975), New Zealand badminton player.
- Lianne Sobey, Canadian curler
- Lianne Tan (born 1990), Belgian badminton player
- Lianne Valentin (born 2001), Filipina actress
