= Nordic Challenge Cup =

Nordic Challenge Cup (NCC) was the predecessor of the popular and long-running sports car racing series Interserie, which is known as the "European Can-Am". NCC consisted of only three races in 1969 and was replaced by Interserie in 1970. It is now mostly remembered for the large number of Formula One drivers competing in it. Among these drivers were Jochen Rindt, who won the F1 World Drivers' Championship posthumously in 1970, and Jackie Oliver. The series also launched the career of Leo Kinnunen who went on to win the World Sportscar Championship the next year.

== Races ==
Rnd	Race track	Date	Location	Winning driver	Car
1	(Finland) Keimola Motor Stadium	August 24	Vantaa	(Austria) Jochen Rindt	Porsche 908
2	(Sweden) Mantorp Park	August 31	Mantorp	(Finland) Leo Kinnunen	Porsche 908
3	(Sweden) Scandinavian Raceway	September 14	Anderstorp	(Finland) Leo Kinnunen	Porsche 908

== Final standings ==
Pos	Driver	Car	Points
1	(Finland) Leo Kinnunen	Porsche 908	60
2	(Switzerland) Herbert Müller	Lola T70	42
3	(Sweden) Jo Bonnier	Lola T70	33
4	(United Kingdom) David Piper	Lola T70	30
5	(United Kingdom) Chris Craft	Porsche 908	25
5	(United Kingdom) Brian Redman	Lola T70	25
7	(United Kingdom) Barrie Smith	Lola T70	24
8	(Belgium) Teddy Pilette	Alfa Romeo T33	23
9	(Sweden) Richard Broström	Porsche 908	16
9	(United Kingdom) Richard Attwood	Lola T70	16
