= Leo Kinnunen =

Finnish racing driver (1943–2017)

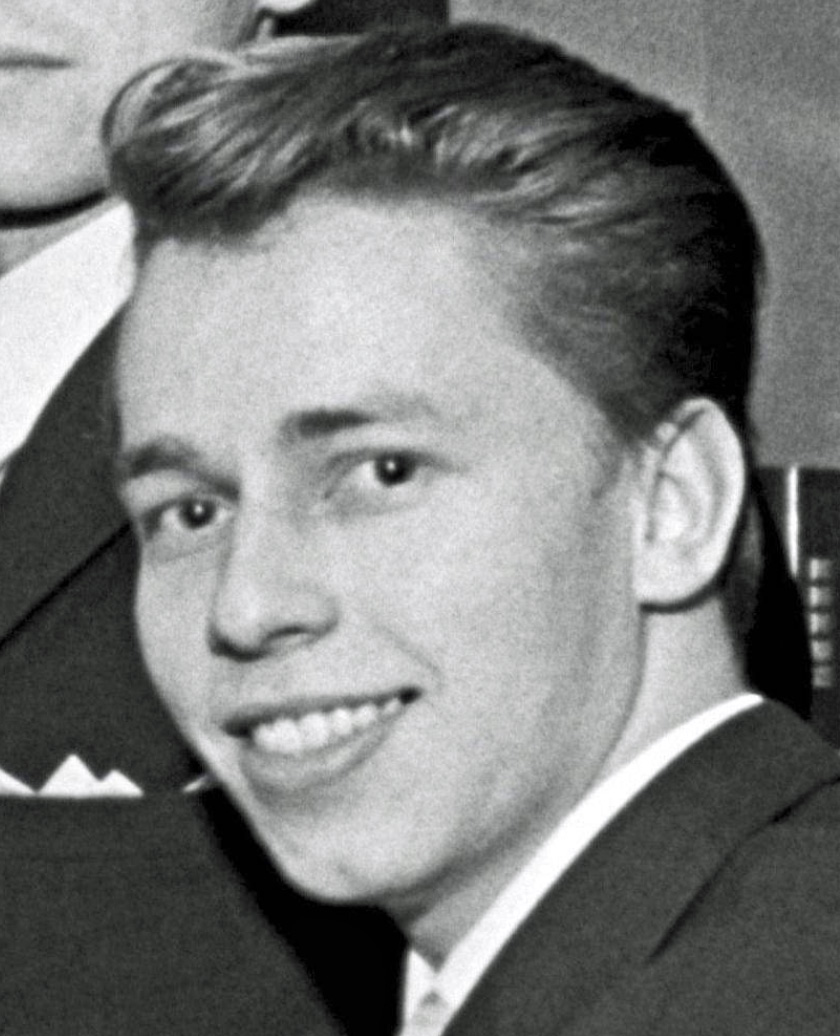
- Kinnunen in 1966
- Born: Leo Juhani Kinnunen; 5 August 1943; Tampere, Finland
- Died: 26 July 2017 (aged 73); Turku, Finland

Formula One World Championship career
- Nationality: (Finland) Finnish
- Active years: 1974
- Team: AAW Racing Team (non-works Surtees)
- Entries: 6 (1 start)
- Championships: 0
- Wins: 0
- Podiums: 0
- Career points: 0
- Pole positions: 0
- Fastest laps: 0
- First entry: 1974 Belgian Grand Prix
- Last entry: 1974 Italian Grand Prix

Leo Juhani "Leksa" Kinnunen (5 August 1943 – 26 July 2017) was a Finnish racing driver, and the first Formula One driver from Finland.

Kinnunen won the Nordic Challenge Cup in 1969 and then was hired by the JWA team to drive one of the factory-backed Gulf-sponsored Porsche 917K in the 1970 World Sportscar Championship season endurance races, 1000km, 6 hours, 12 hours or 24 hours. Paired with Pedro Rodríguez, they won in Daytona, Brands Hatch, Monza, and Watkins Glen. When the Mexican was sick, the Flying Finn set the all-time fastest lap time at the 1970 Targa Florio at 33:36.0 (79.890 mph/128.571 km/h) for the 72km long lap in the Sicilian mountains as Kinnunen had to catch up to and pass a Ferrari.

When Jackie Oliver returned to JWA for 1971, Kinnunen continued elsewhere with sportscar racing, winning the European Interserie from 1971–1973. In 1974, he switched to Formula One, but in addition to the problems with the underpowered Surtees TS16, his team soon ran into financial problems. He was the last driver to compete in Formula One using an open-face helmet.

== Early career ==
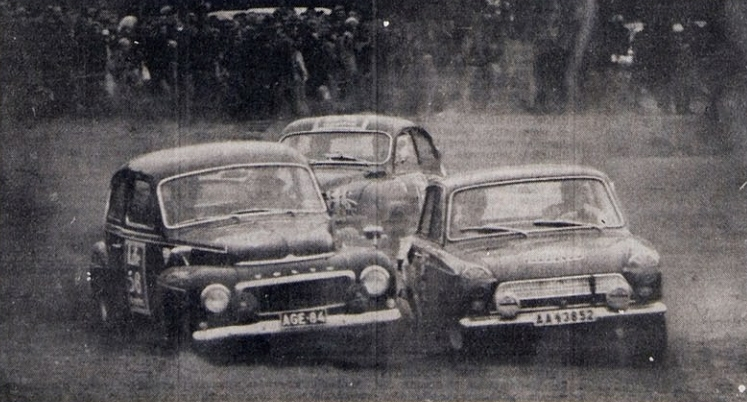
Kinnunen (left) at the 1964 1000 Lakes Rally

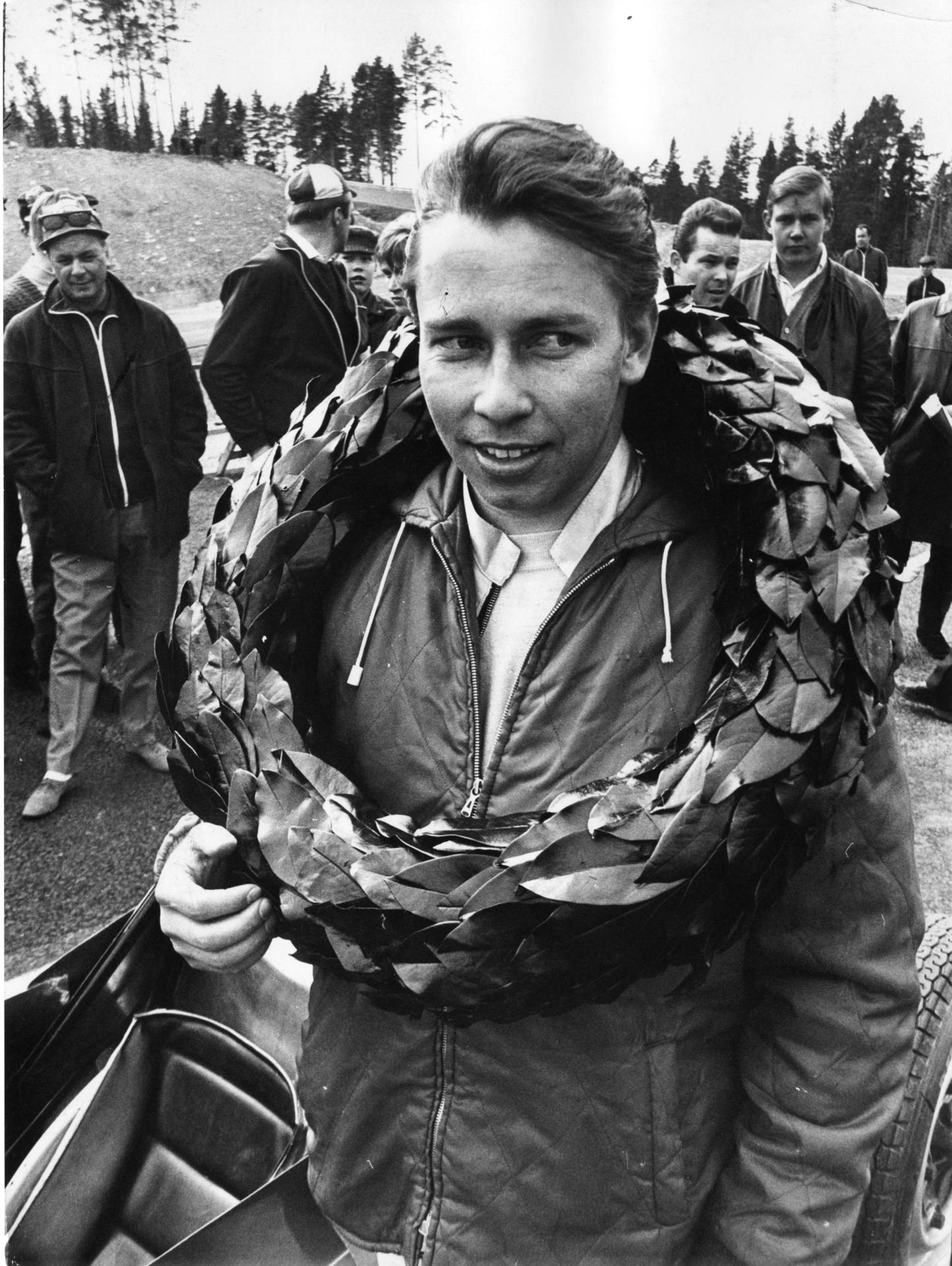
Kinnunen in 1968

Kinnunen started his racing career on motorcycles, but switched to four wheels after receiving his driver's license in the early 1960s. He quickly gained success in rallying, autocross and ice racing. He finished runner-up in the Finnish Rally Championship and matched the points total of the winner Simo Lampinen. Kinnunen also participated in the Finnish F3 Championship with an outdated Brabham in 1967, and a Titan which he drove to several victories in 1968, including one at Ahvenisto Race Circuit in which he managed to beat Swedish future Formula One star Ronnie Peterson.

== International breakthrough ==
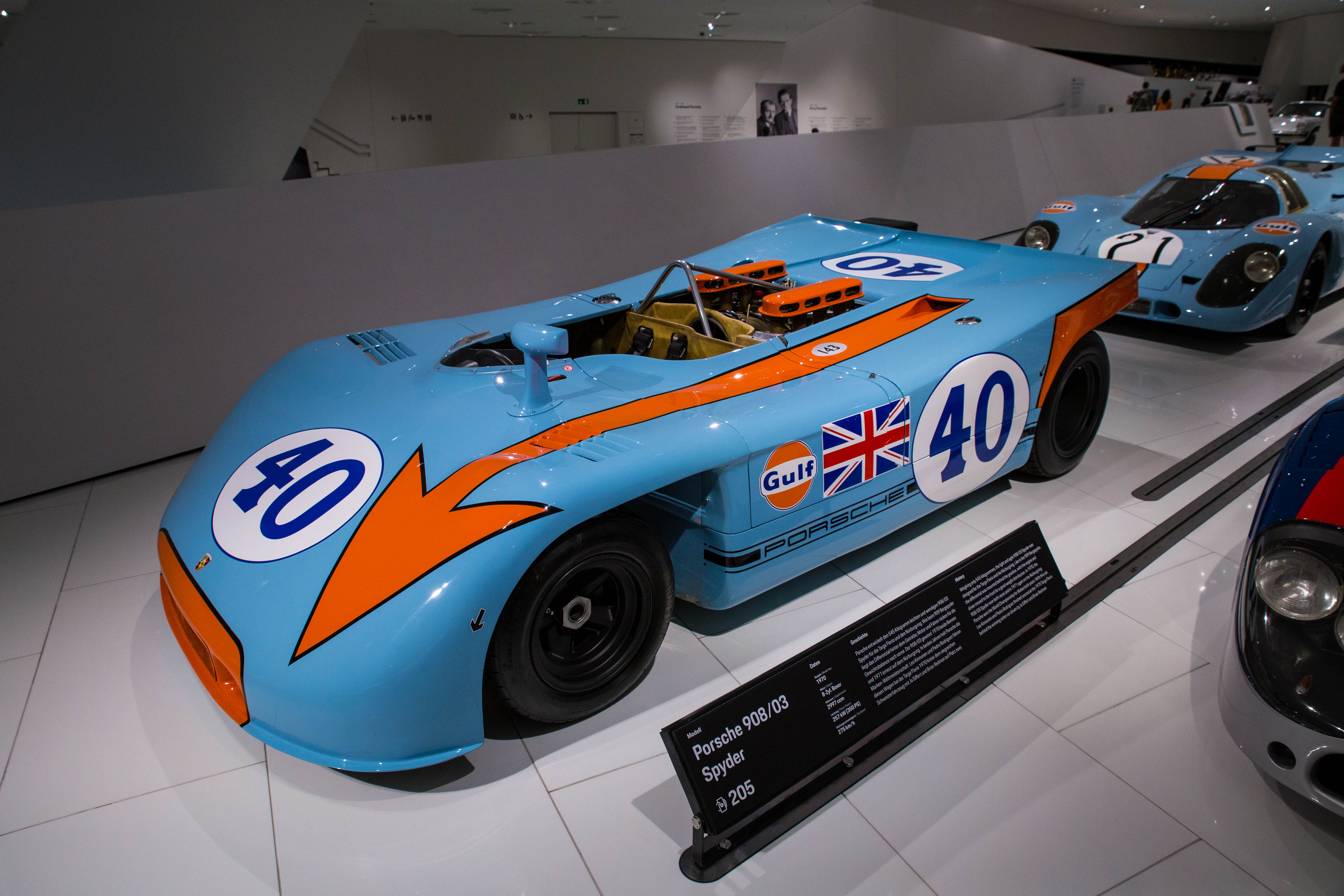
Two of the Gulf-JWA Porsches Kinnunen raced in 1970, the No. 40 908/03 of the '70 Targa, and the No. 21 917KK of '70 Le Mans

In 1969, Kinnunen made a complete switch to circuit racing and won the Nordic Challenge Cup, predecessor of the popular Interserie, with two wins and a second place at Keimola Motor Stadium after a close battle with Jochen Rindt. In October he was then invited to test a Porsche 917 at Österreichring and made such an impression that he was hired by JWA to partner Pedro Rodriguez in the World Sportscar Championship. The pair surprised the racing world by winning the first race, 1970 24 Hours of Daytona, and went on to win three more rounds in the championship for Porsche. For Kinnunen, however, this was unsatisfying time. The car was built for Rodriguez' measurements and driving style, and after Kinnunen managed to quickly outpace him with his own set-ups, he wasn't allowed to modify the car to suit his style anymore. His chance to shine finally came at the 1970 Targa Florio with the new Porsche 908/03 as Rodriguez was ill on race day. Having raced more laps than most others on the 72 km long mountain roads, and in need to pass a Ferrari for second place, on the final lap of the race, Kinnunen set a time of 33'36min, breaking the old lap record by 1½ minutes. With the Targa being discontinued as an all-out race a few years later, this remains as the all-time fastest ever lap time recorded for the Sicilian road circuit.

== Interserie ==
Kinnunen then moved on to drive Porsche 917 for Finnish AAW Racing Team in the Interserie. He won the championship in his debut year, despite withdrawing from the race at Norisring after seeing his former team-mate Rodriguez crash into the barriers and lose his life. He eventually went on to win the championship three times in a row, in 1971, 1972 and 1973, with a total of 18 heat and 11 outright wins. In 1973, he also participated in the World Rally Championship event 23rd 1000 Lakes Rally and finished third with his Porsche Carrera, behind Timo Mäkinen and Markku Alén.

== Formula One ==
Kinnunen was close to moving to Formula One already for the 1971 season. With the help of Jochen Rindt he was negotiating for a race seat with Team Lotus, which was dominating the series at the time and eventually won the World Constructors' Championship that season. After Rindt's sudden death at Monza, the negotiations came to a halt. According to Kinnunen, Bernie Ecclestone wanted him to drive for free. Kinnunen turned down the offer and demanded a wage for his services, as he was a professional racer.

In 1974, Kinnunen was looking for a job and John Surtees offered him one of his new Formula One cars, Surtees TS16, on lease. Kinnunen accepted the offer since the Surtees TS14 had done well the previous season. After finally finding sponsorship, Kinnunen entered the series with a new team and a Cosworth DFV V8 3.0 litre engine. Antti Aarnio-Wihuri allowed the team to use the AAW Racing Team name, which was recognized and had a good reputation in racing circles.

AAW Racing's first Grand Prix at Nivelles turned out to be a disaster. The TS16 arrived in time for the race weekend, but Kinnunen had never even sat in the car before. It also turned out that the car had been used as a mobile testbed by the factory, and it already had a damaged monocoque and rear suspension. On top of that, it was 80 kilos overweight, the engine lacked power and the team was not allowed to get the top quality tires used by the top teams. When Kinnunen took the car on track, its gearbox broke after three laps. The team, consisting of only three mechanics, had no spare parts and repair work turned out to be unsuccessful, as the gearbox broke again in qualifying, leaving Kinnunen without a recorded time and the only driver not to qualify for the race.

After Nivelles, the team concentrated on testing and fixing the car. They did not travel to Monaco but entered the next race in Sweden. Kinnunen qualified 25th, and while usually only 24 drivers would be allowed to start, Kinnunen's good standing within the Swedish motorsport circle meant an exception was made for him and he was allowed to start.

The AAW team knew that the car would not last the whole race, so they fueled it for only ten laps in order to make a quick press run. This compensated for the TS16's heavy weight, and Kinnunen managed to overtake five cars in eight laps before a spark plug problem forced him to retire. Kinnunen later stated that a spark plug thread in the cylinder head had been stripped prior to the race. A Ferrari mechanic had loaned them a threaded insert kit to fix it, but a mechanic inadvertently damaged the threads while installing the plug and it never seated properly.

The rest of the season did not go well for the team either. They were not allowed to take part in the Dutch Grand Prix, and failed to qualify for the races in France, Great Britain, Italy or Austria. Lack of funding then forced the team to retire from Formula One.

== Later career ==
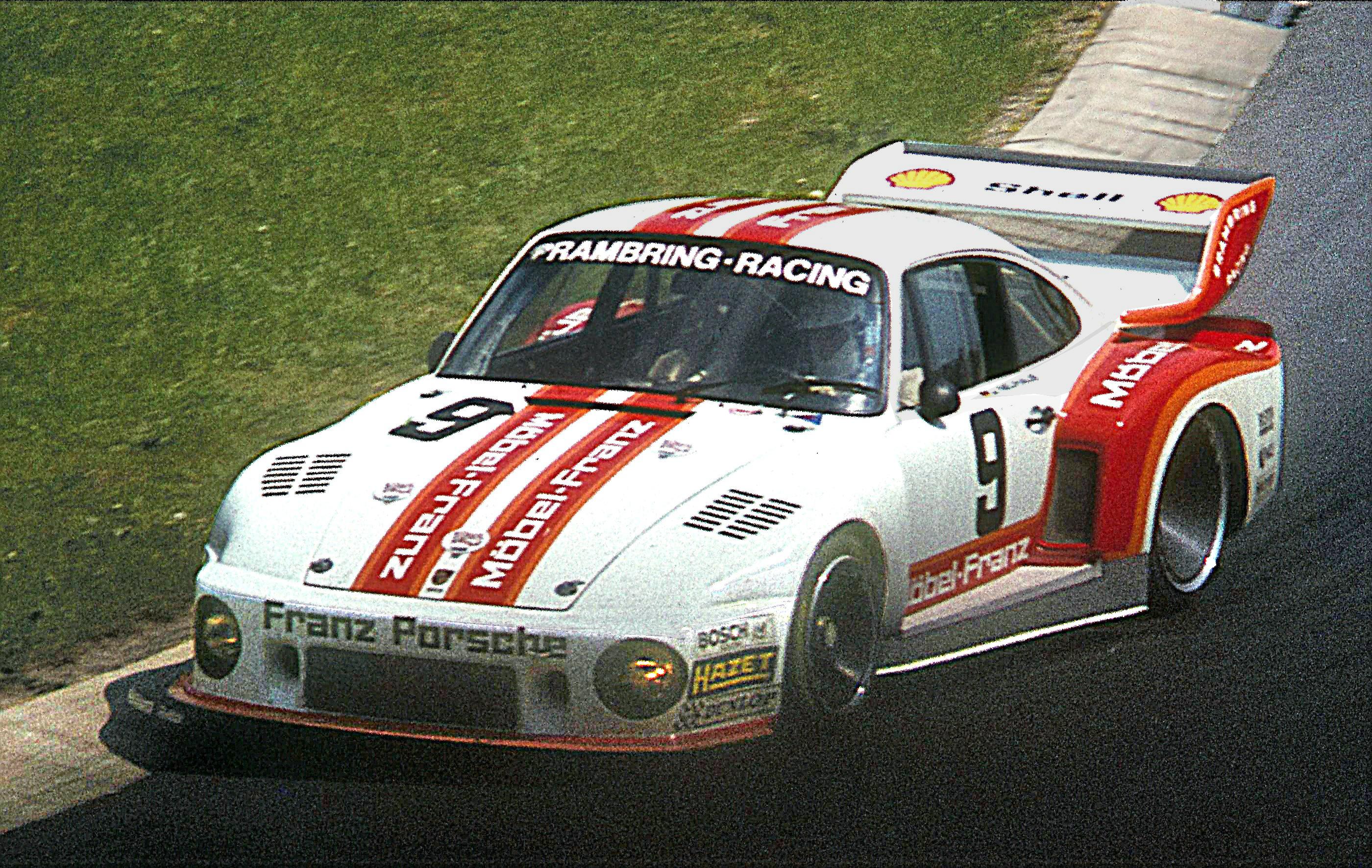
Kinnunen driving a Porsche 935 at the 1977 1000 km Nürburgring

After his short stint in Formula One, Kinnunen went back to the Interserie for the series' last event in Hockenheim. He won both heats, and placed sixth overall in the championship just for the points from this race. Kinnunen was then hired by Martini Racing to drive a Porsche 908 Turbo in the World Sportscar Championship in 1975. Partnered with Herbert Müller, his best result of the season was third at Nürburgring. In 1976, he switched teams and raced a Porsche 934 Turbo with Egon Evertz. They managed to collect three podium places and the highlight of the season was a second place at Watkins Glen. After the season the team quit in racing due to financial problems. Kinnunen quit his circuit racing career in 1977, but still raced in a few rally events in Finland, winning the 1979 Arctic Rally. He remained in the sport in administration and lived in Turku.

Kinnunen was asked to drive in the film Le Mans personally by actor and racing enthusiast Steve McQueen, who himself drove for Porsche in North America. Kinnunen's contract with Porsche did not allow the performance and he was replaced by David Piper, who was severely injured during the filming.

== Racing record ==
=== Complete Formula One World Championship results ===
(key)

Year	Entrant	Chassis	Engine	1	2	3	4	5	6	7	8	9	10	11	12	13	14	15	WDC	Points
1974	AAW Racing Team	Surtees TS16	Ford V8	ARG	BRA	RSA	ESP	BEL; DNQ	MON	SWE; Ret	NED	FRA; DNQ	GBR; DNQ	GER	AUT; DNQ	ITA; DNQ	CAN	USA	NC	0

=== Complete WRC results ===
Year	Entrant	Car	1	2	3	4	5	6	7	8	9	10	11	12	13	WDC	Points
1973	Leo Kinnunen	Porsche Carrera	MON	SWE	POR	KEN	MOR	GRE	POL	FIN; 3	AUT	ITA	USA	GBR	FRA	N/A	N/A
1974	Fiat S.p.A.	Fiat 124 Abarth Rallye	POR	KEN	FIN; 6											N/A	N/A
1974	Fiat	Fiat 124 Abarth Rallye				ITA	CAN	USA	GBR; 14	FRA						N/A	N/A
1977	Leo Kinnunen	Porsche 911	MON	SWE	POR	KEN	NZL	GRE	FIN; Ret	CAN	ITA	FRA	GBR			-	0
1979	Leo Kinnunen	Porsche 911	MON	SWE	POR	KEN	GRE	NZL	FIN; Ret	CAN	ITA	FRA	GBR	CIV		-	0
1981	Leo Kinnunen	Porsche 911 SC	MON	SWE	POR	KEN	FRA	GRE	ARG	BRA	FIN; Ret	ITA	CIV	GBR		-	0
1982	Leo Kinnunen	Porsche 911 SC	MON	SWE	POR	KEN	FRA	GRE	NZL	BRA	FIN; Ret	ITA	CIV	GBR		-	0

=== Complete 24 Hours of Le Mans results ===
Year	Team	Co-Drivers	Car	Class	Laps	Pos.	Class Pos.
1970	(United Kingdom) J.W. Automotive Engineering Ltd.	(Mexico) Pedro Rodriguez	Porsche 917K	S 5.0	22	DNF	DNF
1976	(Germany) Egon Evertz K.G.	(Germany) Egon Evertz	Porsche 908/3 Turbo	Gp.6; 3.0	124	DNF	DNF

== Other results in track racing (not Formula 1 or Le Mans) ==
Day	Race	Car	Drivers	Manufacturer	Classification
19.6.1966	Keimola [GT/S]	Porsche 911	Kinnunen		
11.9.1966	Artukainen [Specials]	VW MAC-1	Kinnunen		4.
5.5.1967	II Helsingin Vauhtikisat	Brabham BT21	Kinnunen	Leo Kinnunen	4.
28.5.1967	I Helsingin Suurajot	Brabham BT21	Kinnunen	Leo Kinnunen (AAW Racing ?)	4.
6.8.1967	II Hämeenlinna Ajot	Brabham BT21	Kinnunen	Leo Kinnunen	2.
3.9.1967	Keimola	Brabham BT18	Kinnunen	Leo Kinnunen	11.
5.9.1967	Ahvenisto	Brabham BT18	Kinnunen		DNF
7.6.1968	Hämeenlinna	Titan Mk 3	Kinnunen		1.
28.7.1968	Djursland Ring	Titan Mk 3	Kinnunen	AAW Racing Team	2.
4.8.1968	XV Västkustloppet	Titan Mk 3	Kinnunen	AAW Racing Team	3.
18.8.1968	VI Hämeenlinnan Ajot	Titan Mk 3	Kinnunen	AAW Racing Team	2.
1.9.1968	Stockholmsloppet	Titan Mk 3	Kinnunen		DNF
15.9.1968	Suomen Grand Prix	Titan Mk 3	Kinnunen		DNF
11.5.1969	IV Helsingin Vauhtikisat	Titan Mk 3	Kinnunen	AAW Racing Team	3.
15.6.1969	Hämeenlinnan Kansainväliset Ajot	Titan Mk 3	Kinnunen	AAW Racing Team	3.
24.8.1969	Nordic Challenge Keimola	Porsche 908/02	Kinnunen	AAW	2.
31.8.1969	Nordic Challenge Mantorp Park	Porsche 908/02	Kinnunen	AAW	1.
2.9.1969	Suomen Grand Prix	Titan Mk 3	Kinnunen		2.
14.9.1969	Nordic Challenge Anderstorp	Porsche 908/02	Kinnunen	Racing Team AAW	1.
18.1.1970	200 mile Buenos Aires	Porsche 908/02	Kinnunen / van Lennep		DNA
1.2.1970	24 Hours of Daytona	Porsche 917	Rodriguez / Kinnunen / Redman	J. W. Engineering	1.
21.3.1970	12 h Sebring	Porsche 917	Rodriguez / Kinnunen / Siffert	J. W. Automotive Engineering Ltd.	4.
12.4.1970	1000 km Brands Hatch	Porsche 917	Rodriguez / Kinnunen	J. W. Automotive Engineering Ltd.	1.
25.4.1970	1000 km Monza	Porsche 917	Rodriguez / Kinnunen	J. W. Automotive Engineering Ltd.	1.
3.5.1970	Targa Florio	Porsche 908/03	Kinnunen / Rodriguez	J. W. Automotive Engineering Ltd.	2.
17.5.1970	1000 km Spa	Porsche 917	Rodriguez / Kinnunen	J. W. Automotive Engineering Ltd.	DNF
31.5.1970	1000 km Nürburgring	Porsche 917	Rodriguez / Kinnunen	J. W. Automotive Engineering Ltd.	DNF
11.7.1970	6 h Watkins Glen	Porsche 917	Rodriguez / Kinnunen	J. W. Automotive Engineering Ltd.	1.
19.7.1970	GP Mugello	Abarth 2000 SP	Kinnunen	Abarth & C.	2.
23.8.1970	Interserie Keimola	McLaren M12	Kinnunen	Bill Bradley Racing	8.
6.9.1970	500 km Nürburgring	Abarth 2000 SP	Kinnunen	Abarth & Co.	3.
11.10.1970	1000 km Zeltweg	Porsche 917	Rodriguez / Kinnunen	J. W. Automotive Engineering Ltd.	DNF
2.5.1971	Interserie Imola	Porsche 917 Spyder	Kinnunen	A.A.W. Racing Team	3.
16.5.1971	Targa Florio	Alfa Romeo T33/3	Stommelen / Kinnunen	Autodelta S.p.a.	DNF
30.5.1971	1000 km Nürburgring	Porsche 911 S	Kinnunen / Waldegård	Leo Kinnunen	16.
6.6.1971	Interserie Zolder	Porsche 917 Spyder	Kinnunen	Racing Team AAW	2.
4.7.1971	Interserie Hockenheim	Porsche 917 Spyder	Kinnunen	Racing Team AAW	2.
11.7.1971	Interserie Norisring	Porsche 917 Spyder	Kinnunen	AAW Racing Team	DNF
22.8.1971	Interserie Keimola	Porsche 917 Spyder	Kinnunen	AAW Racing Team	1.
12.9.1971	500 km Imola	Porsche 917 Spyder	Kinnunen	A.A.W. Racing Team	4.
3.10.1971	Interserie Hockenheim	Porsche 917 Spyder	Kinnunen	A.A.W. Racing Team.	3.
17.10.1971	1000 km of Paris	Porsche 917 Spyder	Larrousse / Kinnunen	A.A.W.	2.
3.4.1972	Interserie Nürburgring	Porsche 917/10	Kinnunen	Racing Team AAW (Keimola Racing)	4.
1.5.1972	Interserie Imola	Porsche 917/10	Kinnunen	Racing Team AAW	DNF
21.5.1972	Interserie Silverstone	Porsche 917/10	Kinnunen	Racing Team AAW	1.
9.7.1972	Interserie Zeltweg	Porsche 917/10	Kinnunen	Racing Team AAW	9.
16.7.1972	Interserie Hockenheim	Porsche 917/10	Kinnunen	Racing Team AAW	1.
6.8.1972	Interserie Norisring	Porsche 917/10	Kinnunen	Racing Team AAW	1.
27.8.1972	Interserie Keimola	Porsche 917/10	Kinnunen	Racing Team AAW	1.
24.9.1972	Interserie Nürburgring	Porsche 917/10	Kinnunen	Racing Team AAW	1.
1.10.1972	Interserie Hockenheim	Porsche 917/10	Kinnunen	Racing Team AAW	1.
1.4.1973	Interserie Nürburgring	Porsche 917/10	Kinnunen	Motorsportclub Stuttgart – Racing Team AAW	2.
1.5.1973	Interserie Imola	Porsche 917/10	Kinnunen	Motorsport-Club Stuttgart/Racing Team AAW	2.
13.5.1973	Targa Florio	Porsche 911 Carrera RSR	Kinnunen / Haldi	Martini Racing	3.
20.5.1973	Interserie Silverstone	Porsche 917/10	Kinnunen	Motorsport-Club Stuttgart/Racing Team AAW	1.
24.6.1973	Interserie Norisring	Porsche 917/10	Kinnunen	Motorsport-Club Stuttgart/Racing Team AAW	1.
1.7.1973	Mainz-Finthen [S+1.6]	Porsche 917/10	Kinnunen	Leo Kinnunen	1.
15.7.1973	Interserie Hockenheim	Porsche 917/10	Kinnunen	Motorsport-Club Stuttgart e. V. Racing Team AAW	9.
19.8.1973	Interserie Misano	Porsche 917/10	Kinnunen	Motorsport-Club Stuttgart/Racing Team AAW	1.
30.9.1973	Interserie Hockenheim	Porsche 917/10	Kinnunen	MSC Stuttgart	1.
29.9.1974	Interserie Hockenheim	Porsche 917/10	Kinnunen	Martini Racing Team	1.
23.3.1975	1000 km Mugello	Porsche 908/3	Kinnunen / Müller / van Lennep	Team Dr. Dannesberger	16.
6.4.1975	800 km Dijon	Porsche 908/3	Kinnunen	Julio Gargallo	DNA
4.5.1975	1000 km Spa	Porsche 908/3	Müller / Kinnunen	Martini Racing	DNF
18.5.1975	Coppa Florio	Porsche 908/3	Kinnunen / Müller	Dr. H. Dannesberger	7.
1.6.1975	1000 km Nürburgring	Porsche 908/3	Müller / Kinnunen	Martini-Racing-Team Dr. H. Dannesberger	3.
15.6.1975	24 h Le Mans	Porsche 908/3	Müller / Kinnunen	Herbert Müller	DNA
29.6.1975	Interserie Misano	Porsche 908/3	Müller / Kinnunen	Dr. H. Dannesberger	9.
21.3.1976	6 h Mugello	Porsche 934	Kinnunen / Evertz	Egon Evertz Solingen	3.
4.4.1976	6h Vallelunga	Porsche 934	Kinnunen / Evertz	Egon Evertz K.G.	DNF
25.4.1976	4h Monza	Porsche 908/3	Kinnunen / Evertz	Egon Evertz	DNS
9.5.1976	6h Silverstone	Porsche 934	Kinnunen / Evertz	Egon Evertz	3.
30.5.1976	1000 km Nürburgring	Porsche 934	Kinnunen / Evertz	Egon Evertz KG, Sollingen	DNF
27.6.1976	6h Zeltweg	Porsche 934	Kinnunen / Schurti / Evertz	Egon Evertz KG	DNF
10.7.1976	6h Watkins Glen	Porsche 934	Kinnunen / Hezemans / Evertz	Egon Evertz K.G.	2.
1.8.1976	Euro GT Misano	Porsche 934	Kinnunen		NC
29.8.1976	Interserie Hockenheim	Porsche 908/3	Kinnunen	Egon Evertz KG.	DNA
4.9.1976	6h Dijon	Porsche 934	Kinnunen / Evertz	Egon Evertz	4.
5.9.1976	500 km Dijon	Porsche 908/3	Kinnunen	Egon Evertz	DNF
12.9.1976	DRM Nürburgring Supersprint	Porsche 934	Kinnunen	Egon Evertz KG Schwießtechnik	2.
19.9.1976	200 mile Salzburgring	Porsche 908/3	Evertz / Kinnunen	Evertz KG	DNA
26.9.1976	DRM Hockenheim	Porsche 934	Kinnunen	Egon Evertz Schwießtechnik Solingen	6.
31.10.1976	Euro GT Hockenheim	Porsche 934	Kinnunen	Schweißtechnik Egon Evertz KG	DNA
20.3.1977	6h Mugello	Porsche 934	Evertz / Kinnunen	Egon Evertz	DNA
29.5.1977	1000 km Nürburgring	Porsche 935	Kinnunen / Neuhaus / Krebs	Josef Brambring	DNF
5.5.1985	National SS Ahvenisto	Saab 900	Kinnunen		DNA
26.5.1985	Nordic SS Kemora	Saab 900	Kinnunen		DNA
26.5.1985	National SS Kemora	Saab 900	Kinnunen		11.
9.6.1985	National SS Ahvenisto II	Saab 900	Kinnunen	TUA	DNF
1985	Kemora	Saab 900	Kinnunen		6.
9.6.1985	Nordic SS Ahvenisto II	Saab 900	Kinnunen		DNS
11.8.1985	National SS Ahvenisto III	Saab 900	Kinnunen		DNS
11.8.1985	Nordic SS Ahvenisto III	Saab 900	Kinnunen		9.
1.9.1985	National SS Kemora II	Saab 900	Kinnunen		DNA

== Complete Rally results (including WRC races mentioned before) ==
Day	Race	Co-driver	Car	Classification
18.7.–19.7. 1964	Kuopio Ralli	Charles Lindholm	Volvo PV544	2.
14.8.–16.8. 1964	Jyväskylän Suurajot	Lindholm	Volvo PV544	35.
16.1.–25.1. 1965	Monte Carlo Rally	Timo Karlsson	Volvo 122 S	DNF
10.7.–11.7. 1965	Itäralli	Ilkka Repo	Fiat Abarth 1000	DNF
5.1.–6.1. 1966	Riihimäki-Ralli	Tapio Klen	Volkswagen 1600 TL	1.
25.2.–27.2. 1966	Hankiralli	Klen	Volkswagen 1600 TL	6.
14.5.–15.5. 1966	Salpausselkä Ralli	Klen	Volkswagen 1600 TL	DNF
9.7.–10.7. 1966	Itäralli	Klen	Volkswagen 1600 TL	DNF
19.8.–21.8. 1966	Jyväskylän Suurajot	Kalevi Leivo	Volkswagen 1600 L	37.
29.10.–3010. 1966	Pohjola Ralli	Leivo	Volkswagen 1600 L	DNF
5.1.–6.1. 1967	Riihimäki-Ralli	Leivo	Volkswagen 1500	3.
24.2.–26.2. 1967	Hankiralli	Klen	Volkswagen 1500	4.
8.7.–9.7. 1967	Itäralli	Martti Kolari	Volkswagen 1600 L	1.
18.8.–20.8. 1967	Jyväskylän Suurajot	Kolari	Volkswagen 1600 L	DNF
9.9.–10.9. 1967	Tampere Ralli	Kolari	Volkswagen 1600 L	DNF
11.11.–12.11. 1967	Helsinki Ralli	Kolari	Volkswagen 1600 L	3.
23.2.–25.2. 1968	Hankiralli	Kolari	Volkswagen 1600 L	2.
9.3.–10.3. 1968	Tunturiralli	Jyrki Ahava	Volkswagen 1600 L	DNF
25.5.–26.5. 1968	Salpausselkä Ralli	Ahava	Volkswagen 1600 L	DNF
5.7.–7.7. 1968	Itäralli	Kolari	Volkswagen 1600 L	DNF
16.8.–18.8. 1968	Jyväskylän Suurajot	Kolari	Porsche 911 T	DNF
25.10.–27.10. 1968	Pohjola Ralli	Ahava	Volkswagen 1600 L	5.
4.1.–5.1. 1969	Riihimäki-Ralli	Ahava	Volkswagen 1600 L	21.
21.2.–23.2. 1969	Hankiralli	Kolari	Volkswagen 1600 L	4.
14.5.–15.5. 1969	Länsirannikon Ralli	Kolari	Volkswagen 1600 L	DNF
15.8.–17.8. 1969	Jyväskylän Suurajot	Kolari	Porsche 911 S	DNF
28.11.–30.11. 1969	Pohjola Ralli	Kolari	Porsche 911 S	1.
20.2.–22.2. 1970	Hankiralli	Erkki Salonen	Saab 96	DNF
20.8.–23.8. 1970	Jyväskylän Suurajot	Salonen	Saab 96	DNF
12.9.–13.9. 1970	Kesoil Ralli	Salonen	Saab 96	11.
26.2.–28.2. 1971	Hankiralli	Urpo Vihervaara	Datsun 1600	DNF
26.11.–28.11. 1971	Pohjola Ralli	Atso Aho	Volkswagen 1302 S	1.
4.2.–6.2. 1972	Arctic Tunturiralli	Aho	Porsche 911 S	1.
3.3.–5.3. 1972	Hankiralli	Aho	Porsche 911 S	DNF
2.2.–4.2. 1973	Arctic Tunturiralli	Jaakko Markula	Alfa Romeo 2000 GTV	DNF
3.8.–5.8. 1973	Jyväskylän Suurajot	Aho	Porsche Carrera	3.
24.11.–25.11. 1973	Pohjola Ralli	Aho	Volkswagen 1302 S	DNF
31.1.–2.2. 1974	Marlboro Arctic Rally	Aho	Volkswagen 1302 S	DNF
2.8.–4.8. 1974	Jyväskylän Suurajot	Aho	Fiat 124 Abarth Rallye	6.
16.11.–20.11. 1974	Lombard RAC Rally	Aho	Fiat 124 Abarth Rallye	14.
31.1.–2.2. 1975	Marlboro Arctic Rally	Vihervaara	Toyota Corolla	DNF
28.2.–2.3. 1975	Hankiralli	Vihervaara	Datsun 160J	DNF
20.9.–21.9. 1975	Kesoil Ralli	Tapio Pinomäki	Volkswagen 1302 S	DNF
29.1.–1.2. 1976	Marlboro Arctic Rally	Aho	Volvo 66	DNF
14.2.–15.2. 1976	Mänttä 200-ajo	Jorma Pulkkinen	Volvo 66	DNF
5.3.–7.3. 1976	Hankiralli	Pulkkinen	Volvo 66	DNF
19.6.–20.6. 1976	Oulujärven Ralli	Pulkkinen	Volvo 66	7.
13.11.–14.11. 1976	Pohjola Ralli	Pulkkinen	Volvo 66	1.
8.1.–9.1. 1977	Riihimäki-Ralli	Pulkkinen	Volvo 66	63.
4.2.–6.2. 1977	Marlboro Arctic Rally	Roman Fehrmann	Volvo 66	DNF
18.2.–20.2. 1977	Hankiralli	Fehrmann	Volvo 66	11.
26.8.–28.8 1977	Jyväskylän Suurajot	Pulkkinen	Porsche 911	DNF
17.9.–18.9. 1977	Länsirannikon Ralli	Fehrmann	Porsche 911	2.
29.10.–30.10. 1977	Teboil Ralli	Fehrmann	Porsche 911	DNF
12.11.–13.11. 1977	Helsinki Ralli	Fehrmann	Porsche 911	DNF
26.11.–27.11. 1977	Pohjola Ralli	Fehrmann	Porsche 911	3.
3.2.–5.2. 1978	Marlboro Arctic Rally	Fehrmann	Porsche 911	DNF
2.2.–3.2. 1979	Arctic Rally	Jussi Kuukkala	Porsche 911	1.
24.8.–28.8. 1979	Jyväskylän Suurajot	Salonen	Porsche 911	DNF
15.9.–16.9. 1979	Länsirannikon Ralli	Salonen	Porsche Carrera	DNF
20.10.–21.10. 1979	Teboil Ralli	Pentti Kuukkala	Porsche Carrera	3.
24.11.–25.11. 1979	Pohjola Ralli	Kuukkala	Porsche Carrera	DNF
2.2.–3.2. 1980	Arctic Rally	Salonen	Porsche Carrera	DNF
29.2.–2.3. 1980	Hankiralli	Kuukkala	Porsche Carrera	DNF
31.1.–1.2. 1981	Arctic Rally	Kuukkala	Porsche Carrera	DNF
28.8.–30.8. 1981	1000 Lakes Rally	Risto Anttila	Porsche 911 SC	DNF
27.8.–29.8. 1982	1000 Lakes Rally	Anttila	Porsche 911 SC	DNF
