= Helena Brander =

Finnish politician

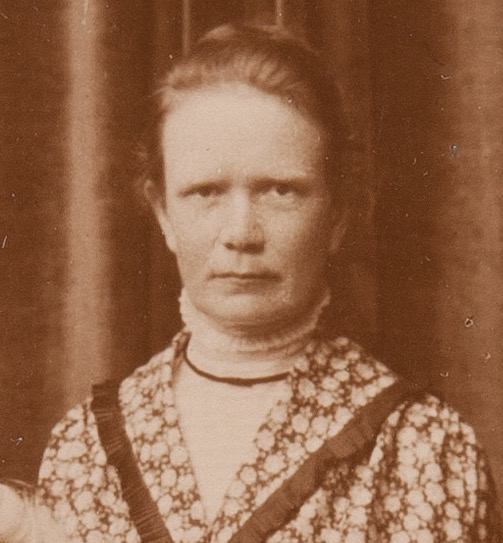
Brander in 1918

Helena Elisabet Brander (5 July 1872 - 31 December 1953) was a Finnish teacher of handicraft, school director and politician. She was a member of the Parliament of Finland, representing the Young Finnish Party from May to December 1918 and the National Progressive Party from December 1918 to March 1919. She was born in Kitee, the younger sister of Augusta Laine and Uuno Brander and the elder sister of Akseli Brander.
