= Andrew Laine =

American biomedical engineer

Andrew F. Laine is an American biomedical engineer, currently the Percy K. and Vida L. W. Hudson Professor at Columbia University and Director of the Heffner Biomedical Imaging Laboratory. He is known for his research in mathematical analysis of medical images, signal processing, and computer-aided diagnosis.

Laine received his B.S. degree from Cornell University (Ithaca, NY), and a D.Sc. degree in Computer Science from Washington University's (St. Louis) School of Engineering and Applied Science in 1989. He was a Professor in the Department of Computer and Information Sciences and Engineering at the University of Florida (Gainesville, FL) from 1990 to 1997. Subsequently, he joined the Department of Biomedical Engineering at Columbia University. There, he served as Vice Chair of the department from 2003 to 2011 under Van C. Mow and Chair from 2012 to 2017.

In 2017 Laine became a Fellow of the Institute of Electrical and Electronics Engineers, and he was recognized with the Academic Career Achievement Award from the IEEE Engineering in Medicine and Biology Society in 2026.

== Selected publications ==
- A. Laine; J. Fan (2002). "Texture classification by wavelet packet signatures". IEEE Transactions on Pattern Analysis and Machine Intelligence. 15 (11): 1186–1191. doi:10.1109/51.464770
- Laine, A.; Fan, Jian; Yang, Wuhai (1995). "Wavelets for contrast enhancement of digital mammography". IEEE Engineering in Medicine and Biology Magazine. 14 (5): 536–550. doi:10.1109/51.464770. ISSN 1937-4186.
- Laine, A. F.; Schuler, S.; Fan, J.; Huda, W. (1994). "Mammographic feature enhancement by multiscale analysis". IEEE transactions on medical imaging. 13 (4): 725–740. doi:10.1109/42.363095. ISSN 0278-0062. PMID 18218551.
