= Augusta Laine =

Finnish politician

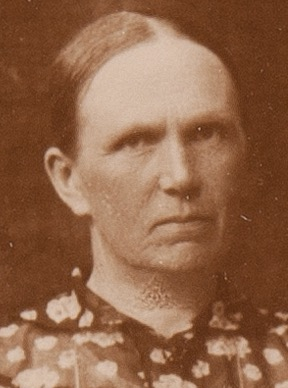
Finnish politician Augusta Laine

Augusta Ottilia Laine (née Brander; 30 March 1867, Tampere - 16 August 1949) was a Finnish teacher of home economics and politician. She was a member of the Parliament of Finland, representing the Young Finnish Party from 1917 to 1918 and the National Progressive Party from 1918 to 1919 and in 1922. She was the elder sister of Uuno, Helena and Akseli Brander. She was married to Johannes Laine.
