= Lianne Sheppard =

American statistician

Elizabeth Anne (Lianne) Sheppard is an American statistician. She specializes in biostatistics and environmental statistics, and in particular in the effects of air quality on health. She is a professor of Environmental and Occupational Health Sciences and a professor of biostatistics in the University of Washington School of Public Health. In 2021, Dr. Sheppard was named to the Rohm & Haas Endowed Professorship of Public Health Sciences.

== Education ==
Dr. Sheppard graduated from Johns Hopkins University with a bachelor's degree in psychology in 1979, and returned to Johns Hopkins for a master's degree in biostatistics in 1985. She completed her Ph.D. in biostatistics in 1992 at the University of Washington. Her dissertation, Aggregate Data Methods for Relative Risk Parameter Estimation in Diet and Disease Prevention Research, was supervised by Ross L. Prentice.

== Research contributions ==
Dr. Sheppard's methodological research interests are observational study methods, exposure modeling, study design, and epidemiology. Her applied research focuses on the health effects of occupational and environmental exposures. She is principal investigator of the NIH-funded training grant Biostatistics, Epidemiologic & Bioinformatics Training in Environmental Health, and she oversees the SURE-EH training program, a project to promote diversity in the environmental health sciences. She is also co-principal investigator of the NIH-funded Adult Changes in Thought Air Pollution study and of a Health Effects Institute study to better understand the role of exposure assessment design and modeling in inference about air pollution health effects.

She has published over 190 peer-reviewed publications. Among her principal methodological/statistical contributions to the environmental health field are 1) developing statistical methods for aggregate data studies; 2) developing measurement error correction methods for inference about health effects for applications to air pollution cohort studies; 3) advancements in spatial and spatio-temporal modeling methods for air pollution exposures; and 4) referent selection and analysis approaches for case-crossover study design for air pollution epidemiology. She has also helped advance scientific understanding of the adverse effects of a variety of environmental exposures, including air pollution, noise, manganese, and pesticides.

== Policy Contributions ==
In 2016, Dr. Sheppard was chosen to chair a panel of the United States Environmental Protection Agency to examine in what quantities nitrogen oxides are harmful. However, in 2018 the Trump administration replaced Dr. Sheppard and other academic experts on the panel with public health officials, at the same time disbanding a related panel on particulate pollution. Dr. Sheppard was quoted as saying that these changes would "result in poorer-quality scientific oversight". Dr. Sheppard is also a participant in a lawsuit against new agency rules preventing scientists funded by the agency from serving on its panels, a move that caused her to step away from a three-million-dollar grant.

In 2021, Dr. Sheppard was appointed chair of the United States Environmental Protection Agency Clean Air Scientific Advisory Committee (CASAC).

== Honors ==
Dr. Sheppard was chosen as a Fellow of the American Statistical Association in 2006, "for contributions to observational studies and environmental occupational epidemiology; for thoughtful commentary in science-policy areas; and for commitment to bringing statistical methodology to elementary and high school education.

In 2020, she received the International Society for Environmental Epidemiology (ISEE) Research Integrity Award.
