= Vicci Laine =

American stage performer, singer, HIV/AIDS fundraiser and activist

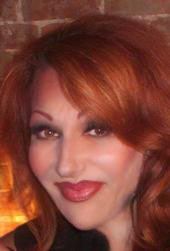
- Born: May 28, 1960; Tacoma, Washington, United States
- Died: July 24, 2017 (aged 57)
- Other names: Kay Mullinax; Betty Blow Back

Vicci Laine (May 28, 1960 – July 24, 2017) was the stage name of American transgender stage performer, singer, HIV/AIDS fundraiser, and activist Kay Mullinax. Her first stage name was Betty Blow Back, which she later changed to Vicci Laine.

== Early life ==
Laine was born in Tacoma, Washington, the oldest of seven children, but grew up in and around Bedford, Indiana. As a child, she recalls believing she was a girl until her mother started making her wear boy's clothing when she started school. In 1978, Laine graduated high school from Bedford-North Lawrence High School and went to study business at Indiana University, Bloomington. She struggled with gender issues and felt that a major university setting was not for her. She dropped out to attend cosmetology school.

== Career ==
Laine started a career in female impersonation in 1980 at a nightclub called Bullwinkles in Bloomington, Indiana out of a need to pay the rent for her apartment.

While on cast at the 21 Club in Indianapolis, Indiana, she won several pageants in the drag world, with her first being Miss Gay Bloomington 1985, and her last being Miss Gay Indiana USofA 1988 In April 2010, Laine was crowned the first Miss Imperial Goddess.

Laine was show director at The Ten nightclub in Indianapolis, Indiana from 1989 until November 2008 when she left to head the cast at Uncle Elizabeth's in Bloomington, Indiana.

Laine evolved into a well-known celebrity impersonator, mimicking entertainment icons such as Cher, Dolly Parton, and Reba McEntire, Lucille Ball, and Joan Crawford. Laine was a contributor to Stoppingthehate.com as a columnist and co-host of Stopping the Hate Television.

== Fundraising ==
In 2007, Laine noticed a lack of funding for HIV/AIDS service organizations (ASOs) and formed Change4Change (C4C) to encourage people to donate money to ASOs in their own communities.

C4C was a major private contributor to HIV/AIDS causes. C4C and Laine were recognized in 2008 with the Celia Busch Award, which "recognizes the hard work and commitment of a community member who works for the benefit those living with HIV and AIDS. One who consistently shows compassion, concern, empathy and commitment in the care of individuals and families, displaying superior interpersonal skills, and compassion in care."

=== Sex change ===
In 1991, Laine began the process for sex reassignment surgery. The surgery was completed in 1996 by surgeons in Montreal, Quebec. She once was engaged to be married but continued to live the remainder of her life as a single woman in her hometown.

== Music ==
Laine's first dance single "It's A Good Look" was released on March 26, 2009.

== Death ==
Laine died on July 24, 2017. She had suffered from cancer for about five years.

== Titles and awards ==
- Miss Gay Bloomington 1985
- Miss Gay Southwest USofA 1986
- Miss Gay Ohio Valley USofA 1986–1987
- Miss Gay Indiana USofA 1988 "Honorary Miss MCIT (Music City) 2006" -
- Indianapolis' Favorite Drag Queen 2007
- Eternal Flame Award 200
- NUVO Magazine Top 3 Indianapolis Entertainers 200
- Celia Busch Award 2008
