= Mikko Laine =

Finnish ice hockey player

- Born: February 9, 1976 (age 50) Espoo, Finland
- Height: 5 ft 11 in (180 cm)
- Weight: 176 lb (80 kg; 12 st 8 lb)
- Position: Right wing
- Shot: Right
- Played for: Espoo Blues; HIFK; Timrå IK; KalPa
- NHL draft: Undrafted
- Playing career: 1997–2009

Mikko Laine (born February 9, 1976) is a Finnish former professional ice hockey forward who played in the Finnish Liiga and Swedish Hockey League (SHL).

== Career statistics ==
			Regular season					Playoffs
Season	Team	League	GP	G	A	Pts	PIM	GP	G	A	Pts	PIM
1994–95	Kiekko-Espoo U20	U20 SM-liiga	4	0	0	0	0	—	—	—	—	—
1994–95	EPS U20	U20 I-Divisioona	16	20	8	28	8	—	—	—	—	—
1995–96	Kiekko-Espoo U20	U20 SM-liiga	30	8	3	11	12	—	—	—	—	—
1995–96	EPS	2. Divisioona	1	0	2	2	0	—	—	—	—	—
1996–97	Kiekko-Espoo U20	U20 SM-liiga	32	6	7	13	32	—	—	—	—	—
1997–98	Ahmat Hyvinkää	I-Divisioona	33	8	7	15	16	—	—	—	—	—
1998–99	Ahmat Hyvinkää	I-Divisioona	46	8	8	16	12	—	—	—	—	—
1999–00	Espoo Blues	SM-liiga	21	0	0	0	2	1	0	0	0	0
1999–00	EPS	2. Divisioona	23	45	19	64	50	—	—	—	—	—
2000–01	EPS	Suomi-sarja	38	33	27	60	14	—	—	—	—	—
2001–02	EPS	Suomi-sarja	32	35	20	55	28	—	—	—	—	—
2002–03	HIFK	SM-liiga	34	4	1	5	4	3	0	0	0	0
2003–04	HIFK	SM-liiga	47	5	5	10	16	10	1	1	2	2
2003–04	Haukat	Mestis	1	0	0	0	2	—	—	—	—	—
2004–05	HIFK	SM-liiga	46	2	2	4	10	2	0	0	0	0
2005–06	HPK	SM-liiga	56	11	17	28	40	13	1	1	2	12
2006–07	Espoo Blues	SM-liiga	15	2	1	3	10	—	—	—	—	—
2006–07	Timrå IK	Elitserien	33	7	3	10	6	2	0	0	0	0
2007–08	KalPa	SM-liiga	33	1	6	7	8	—	—	—	—	—
2007–08	HC Innsbruck	EBEL	2	0	1	1	0	3	0	0	0	4
2008–09	Örebro HK J20	J20 SuperElit	2	2	0	2	2	—	—	—	—	—
2008–09	Örebro HK	Division 1	14	0	2	2	24	9	1	1	2	2
SM-liiga totals			252	25	32	57	90	29	2	2	4	14
