= Liana (disambiguation) =

A liana is a type of vine.

Liana may also refer to:

- Liana (name), a given name and persons with it
- Suzuki Aerio, a car
- Liana (flatworm), a genus of land planarians
- Liana (novel), by Martha Gellhorn

== See also ==
- Lianna, a 1983 film
