= Michelle Laine =

American fashion designer

- Born: Michelle Laine; California, U.S.
- Occupations: fashion designer; director; costume designer; jewelry designer
- Years active: 2000s–present
- Known for: Costume design for Archenemy (2020); Jewelry and fashion design for RZA, Kristen Stewart, and Katy Perry
- Parent: Randy Laine (father)
- Family: Randolph Scott (great uncle)
- Website: www.michellelaine.com

Michelle Laine is an American fashion designer and costume designer based in Los Angeles, California. She is best known for her work with RZA, Demi Lovato, Pink, Angus Cloud, Paramore, The Chainsmokers, John Mayer, Zedd, Kehlani, Phoenix, A-Trak, Tiësto, Aly & AJ. Her jewelry, fashion and costume designs have been worn by celebrities such as Tilda Swinton, Elle Fanning, Marion Cotillard, Katy Perry, Mena Suvari, Alessandra Ambrosio, Diane Lane, Kristen Stewart, Ozzy Osbourne, Jared Leto, and Brandy. Laine is also a long time collaborator of director Floria Sigismondi, known for their prolific music video work together on projects for Lawrence Rothman, Alice Glass and Yves Tumor.

== Career ==
Michelle Laine has designed the costumes for multiple feature films including the 2020 film Archenemy, starring Joe Manganiello and Glenn Howerton, where she collaborated with the late cinematographer Halyna Hutchins shortly before her tragic death in the shooting incident on the set of Rust. In a 2021 interview Archenemy director Adam Egypt Mortimer said of his experience working with Laine, "for example the costume designer Michelle Laine, you know, you look at the costumes on these characters and everything is so colourful and vivid! She brought me so many ideas and so many pictures and so many textures and like, really made the whole movie feel like a world because of what she did with costumes". Mortimer also said "Seeing her [Halyna Hutchins] collaborate with Michelle Laine and Ariel Vida, the costume designer and production designer, all three of them creating coven magic together, building and supporting one another’s ideas." in a 2021 interview with Vanity Fair remembering Hutchins' life.

In 2022 Laine costume designed the feature film Abandoned starring Emma Roberts and Michael Shannon. Laine's experience in cinema is well rounded- she also works as an editor, directer and producer. "I love injecting subtle details. You could argue that personal appearance is the highest form of self-expression, and I think I’m expressing how I view myself through all of the costumes I’ve designed, even if the subject couldn’t be further from myself." Quote from an interview by Faye Bradley in 2021.

== See also ==
- IATSE
- Costume Designers Guild
