= Randy Laine =

American big-wave surfer

Randy Laine (born Elliott Randolph Laine on July 17, 1952 in North Carolina) is an American big-wave surfer, co-pioneer of tow-in surfing, extreme watersports athlete, celebrity-enthusiast, television personality, commercial product endorser and spokesman, and on occasion a men's fashion and action-sports model. Laine is considered to be one of the top, if not the best professional freestyle Jet Skiers to date. In October 2008, Laine will be inducted into the IJSBA's (International Jet Sports Boating Association) Hall of Fame, where he will be honored for inventing many of the extreme aerial maneuvers used in freestyle jet ski competition today. The ceremony is to take place in Lake Havasu, at the conclusion of the IJSBA World Finals.

== Biography ==
Laine, who is nicknamed "The Father of Freeride" is sponsored by Red Bull, Billabong, Jet Pilot, Pro Tec, Skat Trak, and Hydro Turf, and has appeared in and on the cover's of over two dozen magazines, including a 1970's spread in Playgirl Magazine. In January 2001, as a part of the first documented expedition to the Cortes Bank, Laine set a world record for the biggest wave ever ridden on a jet ski (a Yamaha SuperJet), where he conquered a 72-foot wave. Beginning in 2002, Laine joined the Billabong Odyssey as marine coordinator, and has been searching for an unprecedented 100-foot-tall (30 m) wave to ride in an effort to set a record for tow-in surfing. Laine has resided primarily in San Diego, California for the last thirty-five years. He splits his time between San Diego, Baja California, Mexico, and the Northshore of Oahu, Hawaii. Laine has one daughter, fashion designer and model Michelle Laine. Randy Laine is the brother of professional surfer Wes Laine, and great nephew of american actor Randolph Scott, through his great grandfather Rufus Butler Scott. Both Randy and his sister Scott Laine, were named after their great uncle.
