= Antti Aarnio-Wihuri =

Finnish businessman

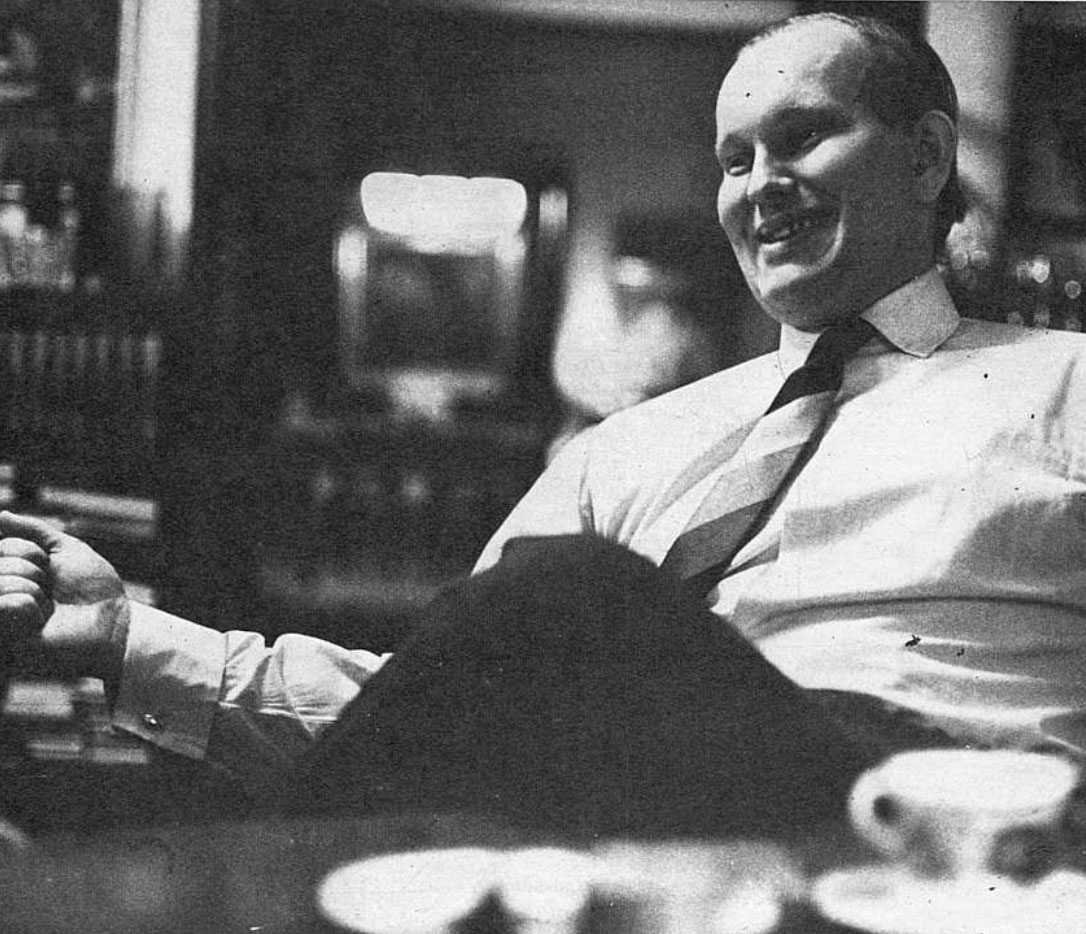
- Aarnio-Wihuri in the 1960s
- Born: Antti Ilmari Aarnio-Wihuri; February 24, 1940 (age 86); Turku, Finland
- Occupation: Businessman

Antti Ilmari Aarnio-Wihuri (born 24 February 1940 in Turku) is a Finnish billionaire businessman. He heads the Wihuri Group, a Finnish diversified conglomerate that has been in existence for over 100 years. It employs over 5,000, and is involved in the industries of packaging, food distribution, aviation and construction equipment retail, private jet charter, and ambulance services. He himself is the largest single shareholder in the Canadian packaging company Winpak.

Aarnio-Wihuri is also known as a former race driver and team principal. With Leo Kinnunen, the AAW Racing Team won the Interserie three times in the early 1970s. Aarnio-Wihuri has later supported young drivers such as Valtteri Bottas.

== Results at track ==
Date	Race	Car	Driver/drivers	Team	Position
12.9.1965	Artukainen [GT]	Porsche 904	Aarnio-Wihuri		1.
5.6.1966	Artukainen [Specials]	Porsche 904	Aarnio-Wihuri		1.
19.6.1966	Keimola [GT/S]	Porsche 906	Aarnio-Wihuri		1.
26.6.1966	Rovaniemi [S/GT]	Porsche 906	Aarnio-Wihuri		1.
24.8.1966	Keimola [S2.0]	Porsche 906	Aarnio-Wihuri		raced
11.9.1966	Artukainen [Specials]	Porsche 904	Aarnio-Wihuri		1.
23.4.1967	Artukainen [Specials]	Porsche 906	Aarnio-Wihuri		1.
28.5.1967	1000 km Nürburgring	Porsche 906	Aarnio-Wihuri / Troberg	Antti Aarnio-Wihuri	DNA
19.5.1968	1000 km Nürburgring	Porsche 906	Toivonen / Aarnio-Wihuri	VW-Auto Oy	DNF
1.6.1969	1000 km Nürburgring	Porsche 906	In entry list only	Sten Axelsson	13.
31.5.1970	1000 km Nürburgring	Porsche 911 S	In entry list only	Racing Team AAW	14.
