= Johannes Laine =

Finnish Educationist and Politician

Johannes Laine (18 April 1866, Viipuri - 10 January 1933; original surname Päätiläinen) was a Finnish educationist, school director and politician. He was a member of the Parliament of Finland from 1913 to 1916, representing the Young Finnish Party. He was later active in the National Progressive Party. He was married to Augusta Laine.
